= 2025–2026 Philippine anti-corruption protests =

Protest movement in the Philippines

2025-2026 Philippine anti-corruption protests
- Part of Flood control projects scandal in the Philippines, Gen-Z protests in Asia and Protests against Bongbong Marcos
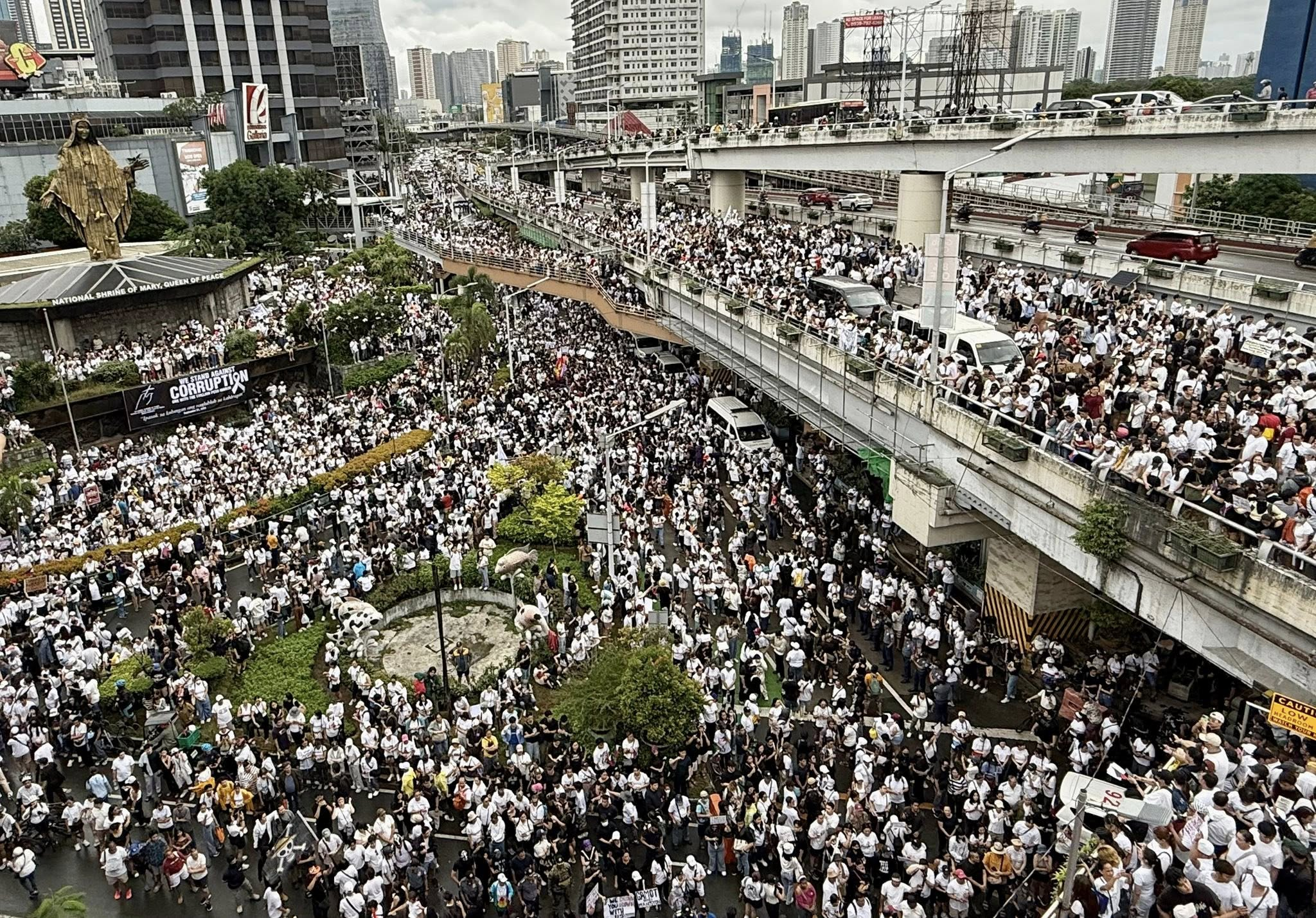
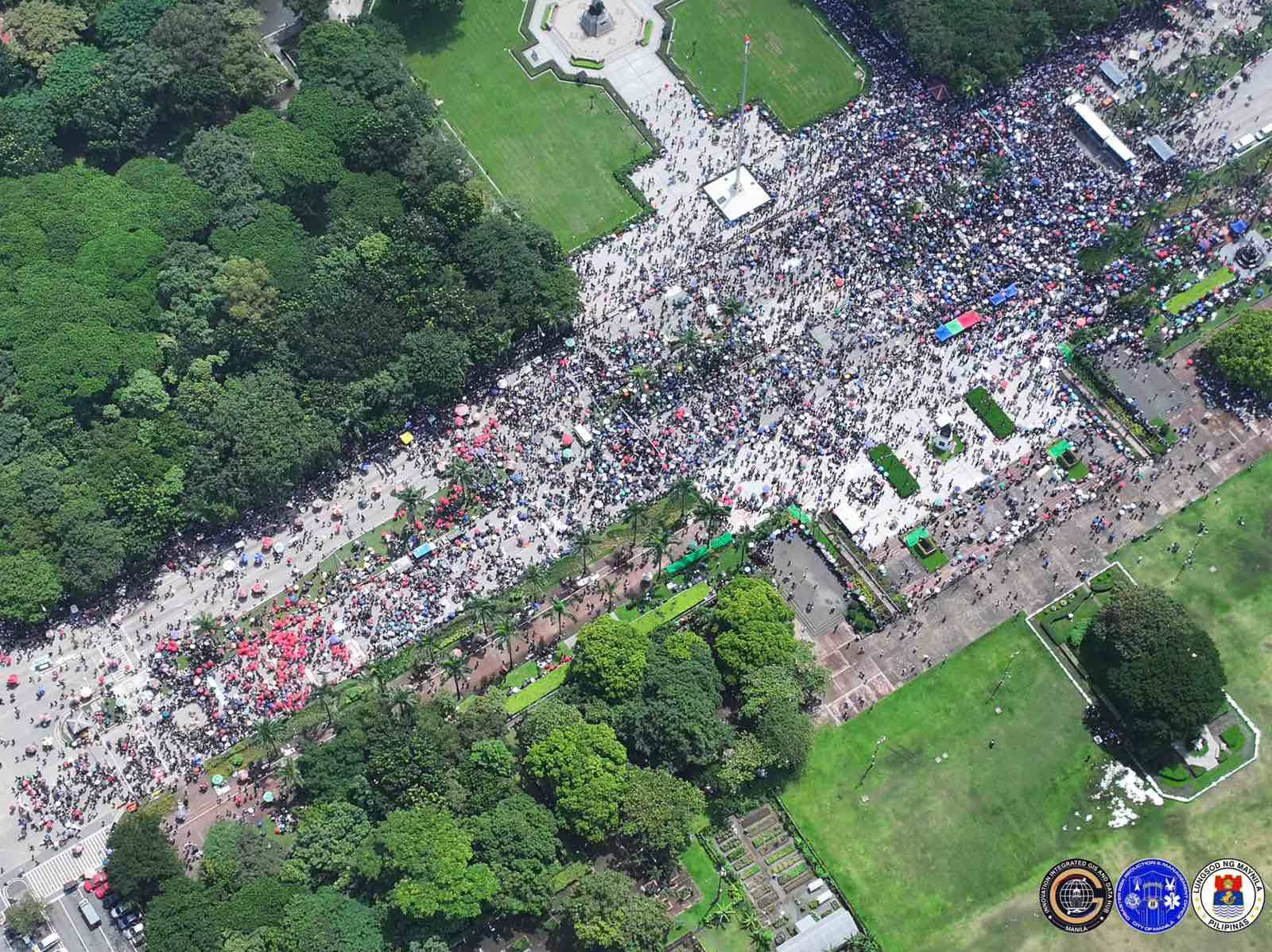
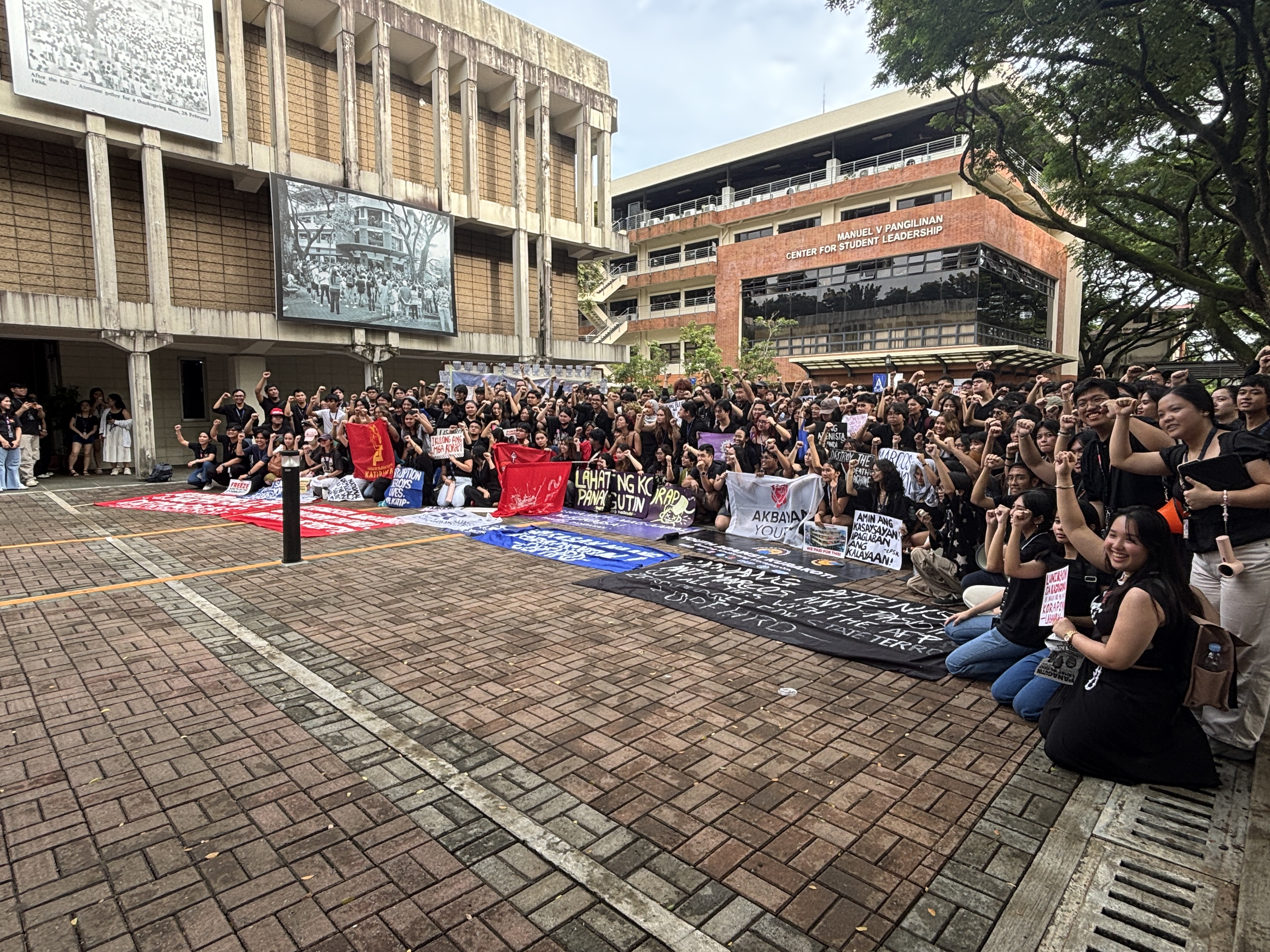
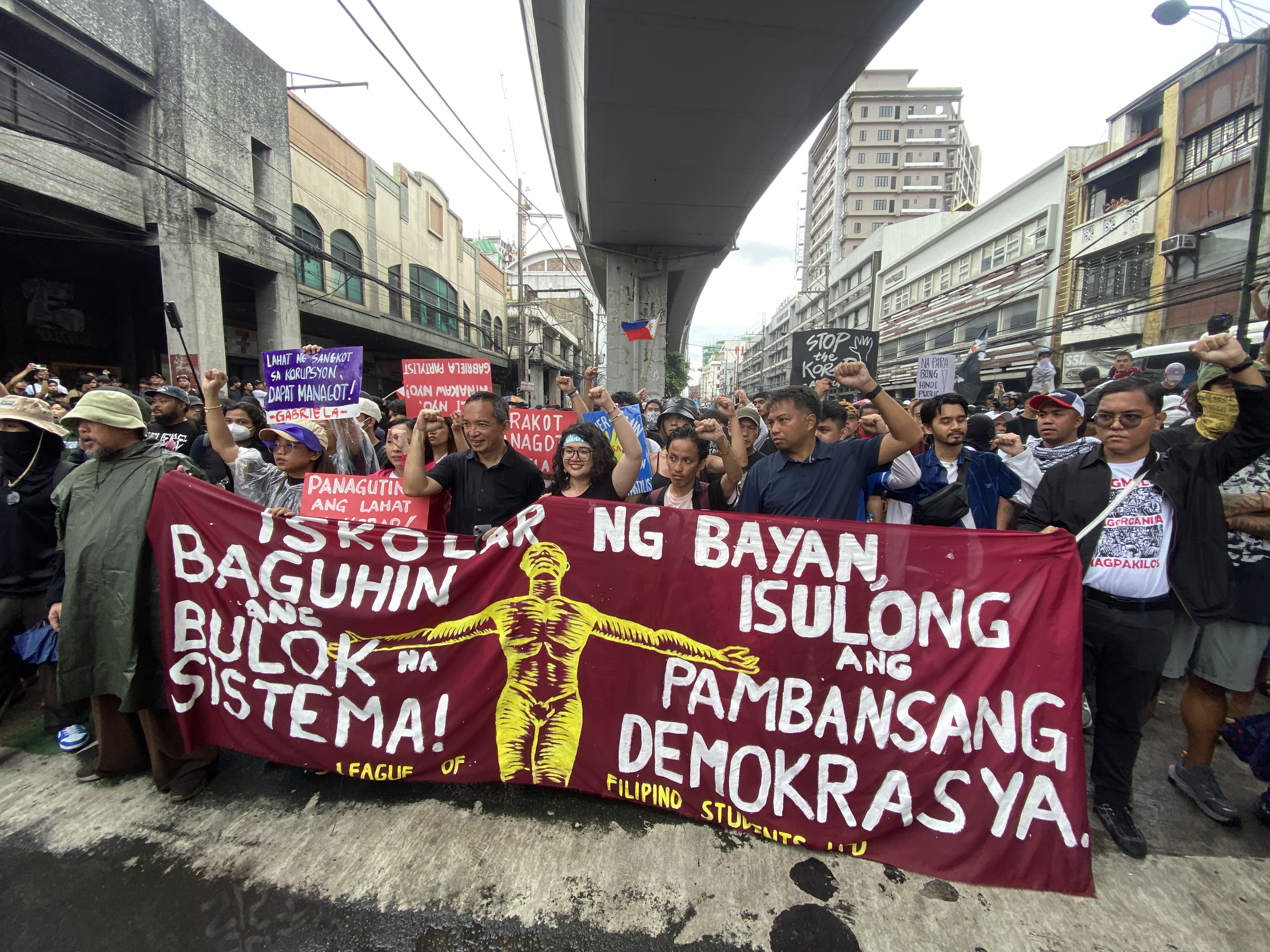
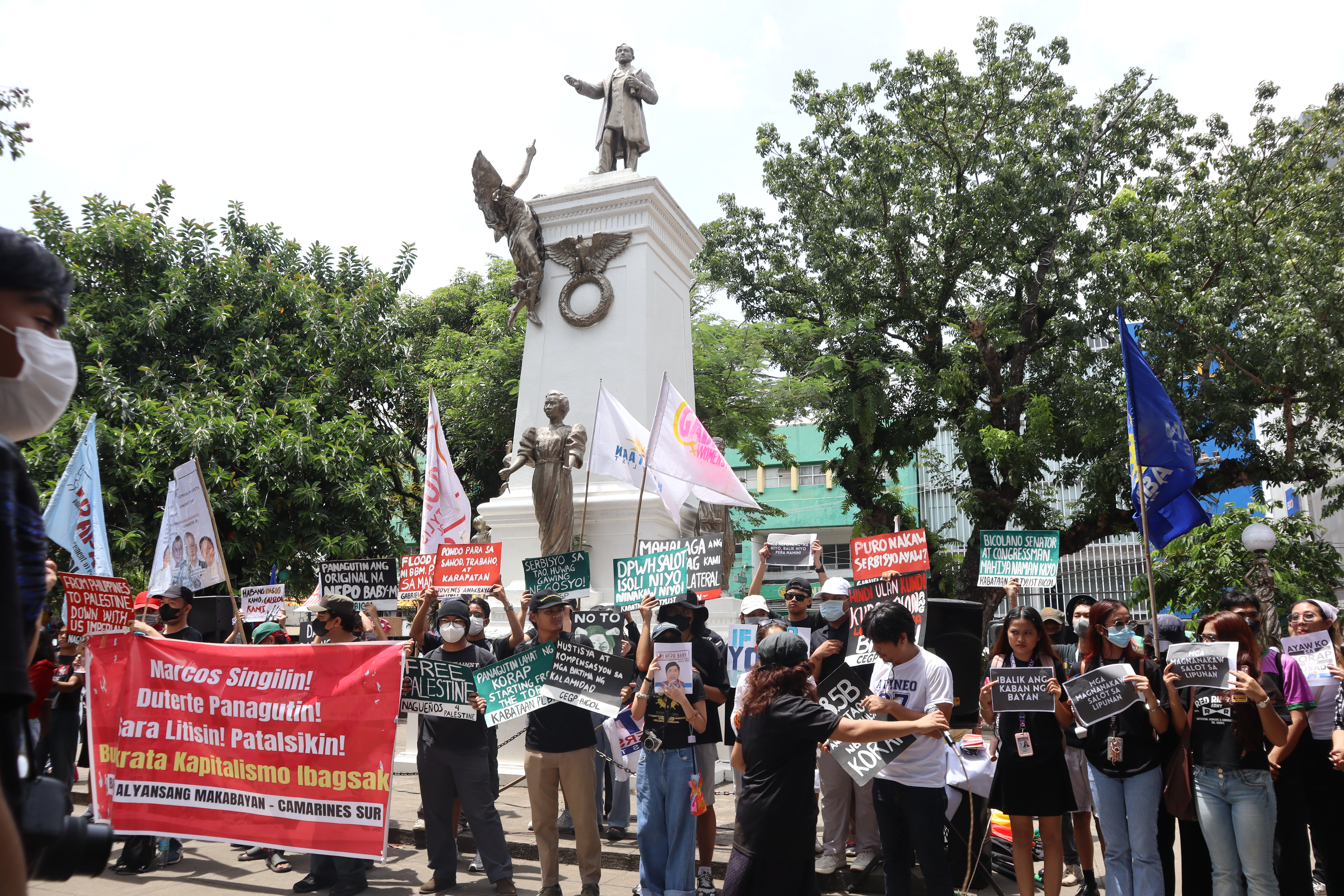
- Clockwise from the top: The Trillion Peso March at EDSA Shrine, Baha sa Luneta demonstration, Baha sa Luneta demonstration at Mendiola, protest in Naga, Camarines Sur, Ateneo de Manila University "Black Friday" walkout
- Date: September 4, 2025 – present (1 year, 2 months, 2 weeks and 3 days)
- Location: Philippines, with solidarity protests overseas
- Caused by: Flood control projects scandal
- Goals: See Groups involved and demands
- Methods: Demonstrations; Picketing; Sit-ins; Internet activism; Student activism; Strikes; Walk-outs; Violent demonstrations and vandalism (Manila areas only)
- Status: Widespread protests across several provinces and cities around the country
- Concessions: Removal of Senate President Chiz Escudero and election of Tito Sotto as Senate President; Removal of Senate President pro tempore Jinggoy Estrada and election of Panfilo Lacson as Senate President pro tempore; Removal of Senate Majority Leader Joel Villanueva and election of Juan Miguel Zubiri as Senate Majority Leader; Establishment of the Independent Commission for Infrastructure; Resignation of House Speaker Martin Romualdez and election of Bojie Dy as House Speaker; Death of Cathy Cabral; Resignation of Zaldy Co and Edvic Yap from the House of Representatives; Mass courtesy resignations throughout the DPWH; Replacement of resigned Executive Secretary Lucas Bersamin with Ralph Recto; Resignation of Budget and Management Secretary Amenah Pangandaman and appointment of Rolando Toledo as Acting Secretary

Parties
Anti-Marcos Protesters: (no centralized authority); Civil society; 1Sambayan; Akbayan; Artikulo Onse; Bunyog; Kilusang Bayan Kontra Kurakot (KBKK); Mamamayang Liberal; Panatang Luntian; Taumbayan Ayaw sa Magnanakaw at Abusado Network Alliance (TAMA NA); Tindig Pilipinas; Trillion Peso March Movement; White Ribbon Movement; Trade unions and transport groups; Bukluran ng Manggagawang Pilipino; Manibela; SENTRO; Kilusang Mayo Uno; PISTON; Student unions; Church organizations; Catholic Bishops Conference of the Philippines; Church Leaders Council for National Transformation; Leftist groups; Bayan and affiliated mass organizations such as Makabayan, League of Filipino Students, Anakbayan, and GABRIELA; Sanlakas and affiliated organizations such as Partido Lakas ng Masa, Samahan ng Progresibong Kabataan, and Oriang; Diehard Duterte Supporters; Hakbang ng Maisug; United People's Initiative; Bangon Sambayanan; Other DDS groups; Iglesia ni Cristo	(Philippines) Government; Philippine National Police; Civil Disturbance Management (CDM); Reactionary Standby Support Force (RSSF); Philippine SWAT; EOD/K9 Group; Bureau of Fire Protection; Pro-Marcos counterprotesters: September Twenty-One People's Movement Against Corruption; Filipinos Do Not Yield Movement; Sulu for PBBM; Other pro-Marcos groups; Marcos apologists

Lead figures
No centralized leadership	President Bongbong Marcos

Number
≥100,000 protestors (Note: During the Sep 21, 2025 Baha sa Luneta march)	50,000 police; Unknown number of counter-protesters

Casualties
- Deaths: 2 people (1 protester and 1 bystander)
- Injuries: 76 protesters and civilians 95 police personnel
- Arrested: 244 people
- The September 21 protests coincide with the anniversary of the declaration of Martial Law on September 21, 1972. The November 30 protests coincide with Bonifacio Day. The February 25 protests mark the 40th anniversary of the People Power Revolution.

On September 4, 2025, a series of widespread demonstrations began in the Philippines, with the largest initial protests occurring on September 11 at Rizal Park and Liwasang Bonifacio in Manila, and at the People Power Monument, Camp Aguinaldo Gate 4, and EDSA Shrine along EDSA in Quezon City, both within Metro Manila. They involve several anti-corruption protests stemming from the ongoing flood control projects controversy that largely involved the Department of Public Works and Highways (DPWH) and the legislative branch of the Philippine government. According to reports, the demonstrations focus on allegations of massive irregularities in flood control programmes, with some ₱1.9 trillion (US$33 billion) spent over the past 15 years, more than half of which was allegedly lost to corruption. Several cities and municipalities across different provinces also held local demonstrations.

The September 11 protest in Rizal Park ("Baha sa Luneta") was organised by various sectoral groups, including activists and students, while the simultaneous protest at the People Power Monument and EDSA Shrine is known as the "Trillion Peso March", organised mainly by church groups, civil society organisations, student organisations, labour unions, and political coalitions. Although protests were characterised as peaceful throughout the country, an isolated riot by masked demonstrators occurred along streets near Malacañang Palace in Manila, injuring several protestors, bystanders, and policemen, and resulting in two casualties: one from a stabbing attack, and another from a stray bullet.

Protests have continued as of February 2026. The "Trillion Peso March Part 2" and a "Baha Sa Luneta 2" were held on November 30, 2025, while a third reiteration of the aforementioned protests was conducted on February 25, 2026, timed with the 40th anniversary of the People Power Revolution.

Inter-religious leaders have also announced the formation of White Ribbon Movement (WRM) which will lead an anti-corruption rally on June 28, 2026 at the EDSA People Power Monument.

== Background ==
Since 2024, a series of allegations of corruption, mismanagement, and irregularities in government-funded flood management projects have been occurring in the Philippines under the administration of President Bongbong Marcos. The controversy centres on billions of pesos allocated for flood management initiatives, reports of "ghost" projects, (Note: The Bureau of Internal Revenue (BIR) defines "ghost" projects as government infrastructure projects that are reported in government documents as "completed" and "fully paid," but never actually constructed.) substandard construction, and the alleged cornering of contracts by a small group of favoured contractors.

In his fourth State of the Nation Address (SONA) in July 2025, President Marcos reported that his administration had implemented over 5,500 flood control projects and announced plans for at least ten large-scale projects amounting to more than ₱500 billion (US$10.15 billion) over the next 13 years. The Department of Public Works and Highways (DPWH) justified these projects as urgent measures to mitigate flooding, particularly in Metro Manila and Central Luzon, but admitted that poor waste management practices were aggravating the flooding problem. Marcos later vetoed ₱16.7 billion (US$339.09 million) worth of flood control projects included in the 2025 national budget, citing redundancy and improper project placement.

On September 1, 2025, Sarah Discaya attended a Senate Blue Ribbon Committee hearing and revealed that her nine construction firms have sometimes been involved in bidding for the same government flood control projects simultaneously. Initially, Discaya denied the allegation, but Senate President pro tempore and committee vice-chairperson Jinggoy Estrada pressed for data from the DPWH, to which Discaya admitted.

== Timeline of events ==
=== September 11 protests ===
Calls for the September 11 demonstrations were first announced by church leaders and civil society groups in early September 2025. Organisers made use of social media platforms and networks of parishes, universities, and labour unions to circulate information and mobilise participants. Practical guidelines for attendees were also shared online, advising protestors to bring water, snacks, umbrellas, and power banks while avoiding items that could be misconstrued as weapons.

==== Baha sa Luneta ====
The main programme began at 9:00 a.m. at Rizal Park (Luneta) in Manila, dubbed as "Baha sa Luneta: Aksyon na Laban sa Korapsyon" ('Flood at Luneta: Action Against Corruption') or the "Billion People March". Around the morning, large numbers of protestors began to converge, and by mid-day, estimates placed the crowd at about 50,000 people. Demonstrators carried banners and chanted anti-corruption slogans, calling for transparency and accountability from government officials. It was followed by a march to the Liwasang Bonifacio in Manila, dubbed as "Save the Philippines", and parallel rallies were held in Baguio, Bohol, Cagayan de Oro, Cebu, and Negros, with overseas Filipino communities staging solidarity actions.

==== Trillion Peso March ====
Occurring simultaneously, the Trillion Peso March was centred at the People Power Monument and EDSA Shrine in Quezon City. Comedian and television host Vice Ganda addressed the rally, urging President Marcos to take action against government officials accused of corruption and expressing support for reinstating the death penalty for those involved in questionable flood control projects. Other public figures, including Ogie Alcasid, Iza Calzado, Anne Curtis, and Catriona Gray, were also present. Former Ilocos Sur governor Chavit Singson also attended but was booed by protestors who called him a "plunderer".

The protest at the People Power Monument saw the band Ben&Ben perform their single "Kapangyarihan" ('Power'). In the afternoon, protests at the monument and White Plains Avenue spilled over onto EDSA, leading to the closure of all northbound lanes. The Metropolitan Manila Development Authority redirected traffic towards Ortigas Avenue, and the Department of Transportation temporarily opened the EDSA Busway to all vehicles. The northbound lanes were reopened around 6:00 p.m.

==== Mendiola clashes and vandalism ====
In the afternoon of September 11, masked youth groups numbering roughly 400 joined the Baha sa Luneta protest. Some moved toward Ayala Bridge and later Mendiola, where confrontations escalated around 5:30 p.m. Police reported that demonstrators hurled rocks, bottles, and improvised incendiary devices, including Molotov cocktails, while attempting to breach police barricades.

A trailer truck and several motorcycles, including some belonging to the PNP, were set on fire by demonstrators. The PNP accused rioters of stealing firearms from officers. A branch of Hotel Sogo along Recto Avenue was also ransacked. By late evening, police announced that at least 72 individuals had been arrested in Manila due to violent acts, and at least 39 to 40 police officers were injured. Authorities emphasised that the majority of participants in Luneta remained peaceful.

==== Digital activism ====
During the September 21 demonstrations, virtual rallies on online game platforms such as Roblox were organised by Filipino users. Additionally, the websites of 19 government agencies were defaced by hackers in protest against state corruption. Many Pinoy pop and OPM artists expressed support through social media, including SB19, Bini, G22, Kaia, and Katseye member Sofia Laforteza.

=== October to November 2025 protests ===
The Trillion Peso March Movement was launched on October 1, 2025, with another protest planned for November 30, 2025, coinciding with Bonifacio Day. Weekly protests were planned in the lead up to the November 30 demonstrations, with the first of these weekly protests held on October 21, 2025, at the EDSA Shrine.

=== February 2026 protests ===
Third major reiterations of the Baha sa Luneta and Trillion Peso March were conducted on February 25, 2026, explicitly timed with the 40th anniversary of the People Power Revolution.

== Groups involved and demands ==
=== Civil society ===
On September 11, 2025, Baha sa Luneta was convened by various student networks and activist coalitions such as Taumbayan Ayaw sa Magnanakaw at Abusado Network Alliance/TAMA NA (a broad anti-corruption alliance), Panatang Luntian Coalition (youth environmentalists), and student councils from various universities. Many groups that co-organized the Baha sa Luneta later formed the Kilusang Bayan Kontra Kurakot (KBKK)

The Church Leaders Council for National Transformation led the Trillion Peso March, along with Simbahan at Komunidad Laban sa Katiwalian (SIKLAB), Alyansa ng Nagkakaisang Mamamayan (ANIM), and Taumbayan Ayaw sa Magnanakaw at Abusado Network Alliance (TAMA NA). Organisers stressed that the protests were not intended to call for the removal of any specific political leader but instead aimed at institutional reforms and accountability.

Protest organisers at the Baha sa Luneta and Trillion Peso March protests listed several demands, including:

- the arrest of individuals implicated in the alleged anomalous flood control projects
- the recovery of alleged ill-gotten wealth, including luxury goods and vehicles
- the public release of government officials' Statements of Assets, Liabilities, and Net Worth (SALNs), along with the lifting of bank secrecy restrictions
- the enactment of stronger anti-corruption measures, including granting subpoena and contempt powers to independent investigative bodies
- the inclusion of representatives from civil society, people's organisations, and anti-corruption groups in the Independent Commission for Infrastructure (ICI)
- the granting of contempt powers to the ICI to compel the participation of government officials in its investigation
- the recovery of stolen public funds and their reallocation toward health, education, housing, and compensation for flood victims.

On November 16, 2025, the Roundtable for Inclusive Development (RFID)—composed of lawyers, businessmen, church and education leaders, and former public officials—called for transparency following recent calamities exacerbated by the alleged misuse of public funds. They called for an Independent People's Commission, a ban on political dynasties, budget transparency, a Freedom of Information Act, and a comprehensive review of the party-list system.

=== Left-leaning parties and coalitions ===
Progressive parties including Laban ng Masa (including Partido Lakas ng Masa (PLM), Bukluran ng Manggagawang Pilipino (BMP), and Samahan ng Progresibong Kabataan (SPARK)) and national democratic parties affiliated with Bagong Alyansang Makabayan (BAYAN) and Makabayan participated at Baha sa Luneta. BAYAN also led protest actions in regions across the Philippines and by OFWs globally, including in Utrecht.

The broad goals of the progressive and national-democratic organisations include the resignation of both President Marcos and Vice President Duterte and the formation of a civilian-led People's Transition Council (PTC). The PLM posited that the PTC should hold corrupt officials accountable, establish safeguards against corruption, and hold fair elections, but without running in the elections themselves.

Groups such as 1Sambayan, Liberal Party of the Philippines, and Akbayan Partylist joined the Trillion Peso March.

Cardinal Pablo Virgilio David distanced himself from Baha sa Luneta 2.0 due to its demands for Marcos and Duterte to resign, drawing pushback from protest organisers who warned his statement might negatively impact the opposition's unity leading into the 2028 Philippine presidential election.

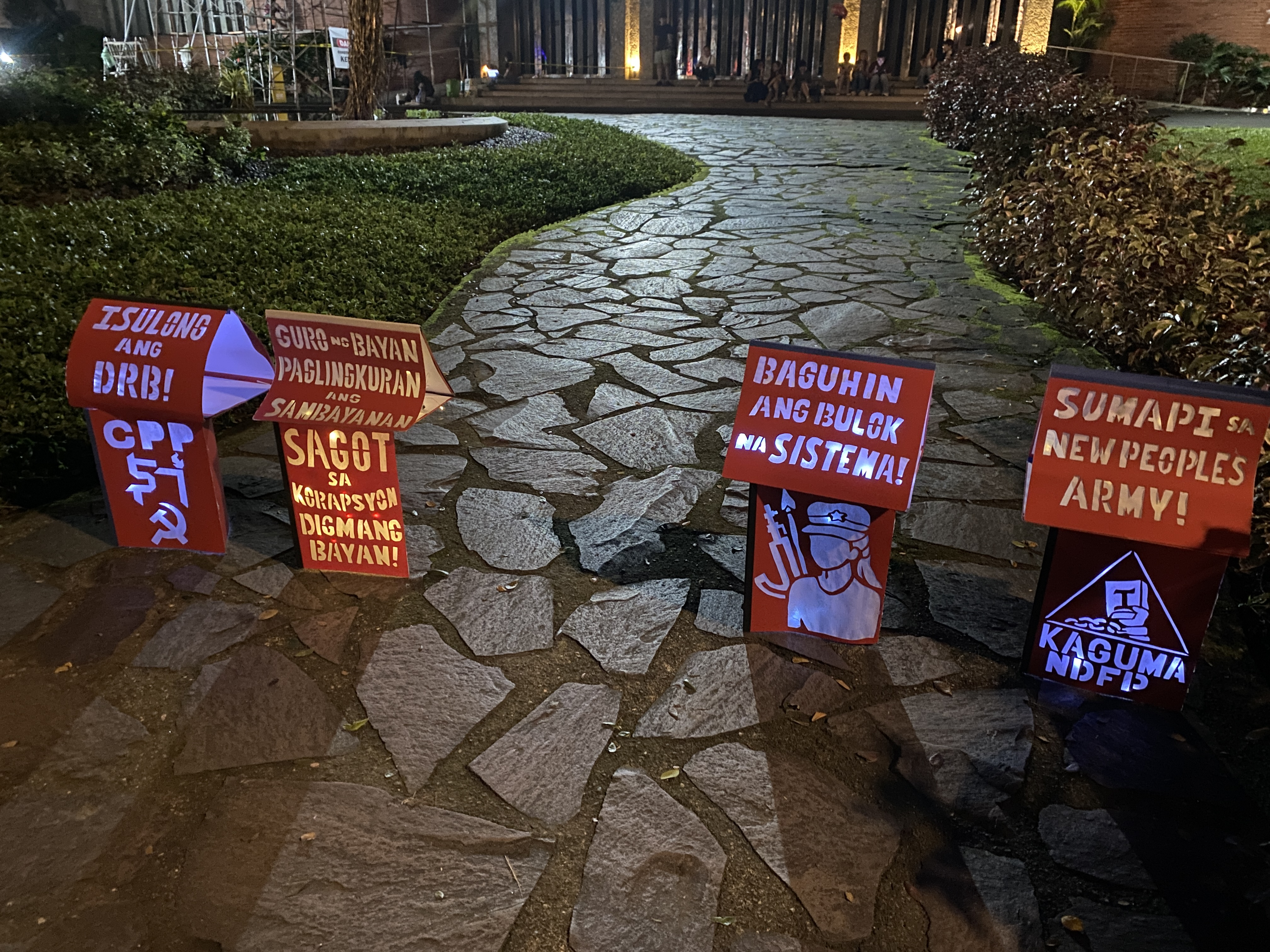
Lanterns by CPP and KAGUMA-NDFP, advocating for revolution.

=== Communists ===
Far-left groups affiliated with the Communist Party of the Philippines (CPP) and the National Democratic Front (NDFP), such as Kabataang Makabayan, also organised protests.

=== Diehard Duterte supporters ===
On September 21, 2025, Duterte supporters gathered near Gate 4 of Camp Aguinaldo at 7:00 a.m. and had a brief scuffle with other protestors attending the Trillion Peso March. They called for President Marcos's resignation in addition to their pronouncements against corruption. A Catholic nun was ganged up on by Duterte supporters at Liwasang Bonifacio after stating Marcos was "only a victim of dark forces".

In Davao City, pro-Duterte groups roasted 100 cows as an "offering to the heavens" against corruption in a prayer rally organised by Vice President Duterte. The sacrificial slaughtering was condemned by the Philippine Animal Welfare Society. It was observed that Duterte loyalists shared the calls for the resignation of Marcos, but drew the line at removing Vice President Duterte.

=== Pro-Marcos counterprotesters ===
Supporters of President Marcos launched counterprotests in response to the demonstrations against the administration. Groups such as the Filipinos Do Not Yield Movement called for accountability for everyone involved in the flood control projects scandal.

=== Iglesia ni Cristo ===
The Rally for Transparency and a Better Democracy is a protest led by the Iglesia ni Cristo (INC) which began on November 16, 2025. Around 650,000 people gathered according to the Manila Police District. While open to non-members, INC spokesman Edwil Zabala said the rally was not meant to "interfere in politics" but to demand accountability for the flood control projects scandal.

Senator Rodante Marcoleta, an INC member, spoke at the rally. Senator Imee Marcos was in attendance and alleged that her brother, President Bongbong Marcos, First Lady Liza Araneta Marcos, and their children used drugs. Zabala later clarified that Senator Imee Marcos's speech was outside the protest's scope of calling for transparency.

== Government response ==
The Philippine National Police (PNP) placed Metro Manila under full alert in the week leading up to the September 11 rallies, suspending leave for officers and preparing road closures near Rizal Park and EDSA. Authorities stated that no specific security threats had been identified as of mid-September 2025.

President Bongbong Marcos expressed support for the protests, saying he "might be out in the streets" as well if he "were not president". He added that he shared the public's frustration and encouraged people to demand accountability while maintaining peaceful demonstrations. Department of Public Works and Highways Secretary Vince Dizon fully supported the anti-corruption demonstrations, noting that protestors should avoid violence. Conversely, Malacañang Palace Press Officer Claire Castro warned that certain actors "may try to exploit this legitimate cause for their own personal interests and to undermine the government."

Defence Secretary Gilbert Teodoro and Armed Forces chief of staff Romeo Brawner Jr. responded to calls for the military to withdraw support from President Marcos by issuing a joint statement affirming the armed forces' non-partisanship and professionalism. They emphasised that the 160,000-member institution follows the Constitution and operates under the chain of command.

== 2025 protests ==
Cities in the Philippines where protests occurred

=== September 4–10 ===
Protesters converged at the headquarters of Curlee and Sarah Discaya's St. Gerrard Construction General Contractor and Development Corporation in Pasig. The protesters vandalized the headquarter's gate. According to Jonila Castro, one of the protesters, "We chose to come here to one of the companies of the so-called 'Flood Control Queen and King,' the Discayas, to show and bring the people's anger against thieves." In front of the DPWH main office along Bonifacio Drive, protesters, including those from youth group Anakbayan threw rotten vegetables and smelly water at the gate, which the Manila Police District Philippine National Police (PNP) tried to defend using their shields.

In Cebu, regional leaders from AMA Sugbu Kilusang Mayo Uno (KMU), Bayan Muna Cebu, and Bagong Alyansang Makabayan (Bayan) Central Visayas threw rotten tomatoes at the office of DPWH Region VII office in Cebu City decrying corruption. A Takbo Laban sa Korapsyon (Run Against Corruption) fun run was done at the University of the Philippines Diliman (UP Diliman) as a protest against corruption where more than 1,000 people participated. They condemned President Bongbong Marcos as the original nepo baby. Organized by the UP Diliman University Student Council (UPD USC), Chairperson Joaquin "Waks" Buenaflor said that they organized the event to unite the people against corruption especially amidst the flood control projects controversy.

=== September 12 ===
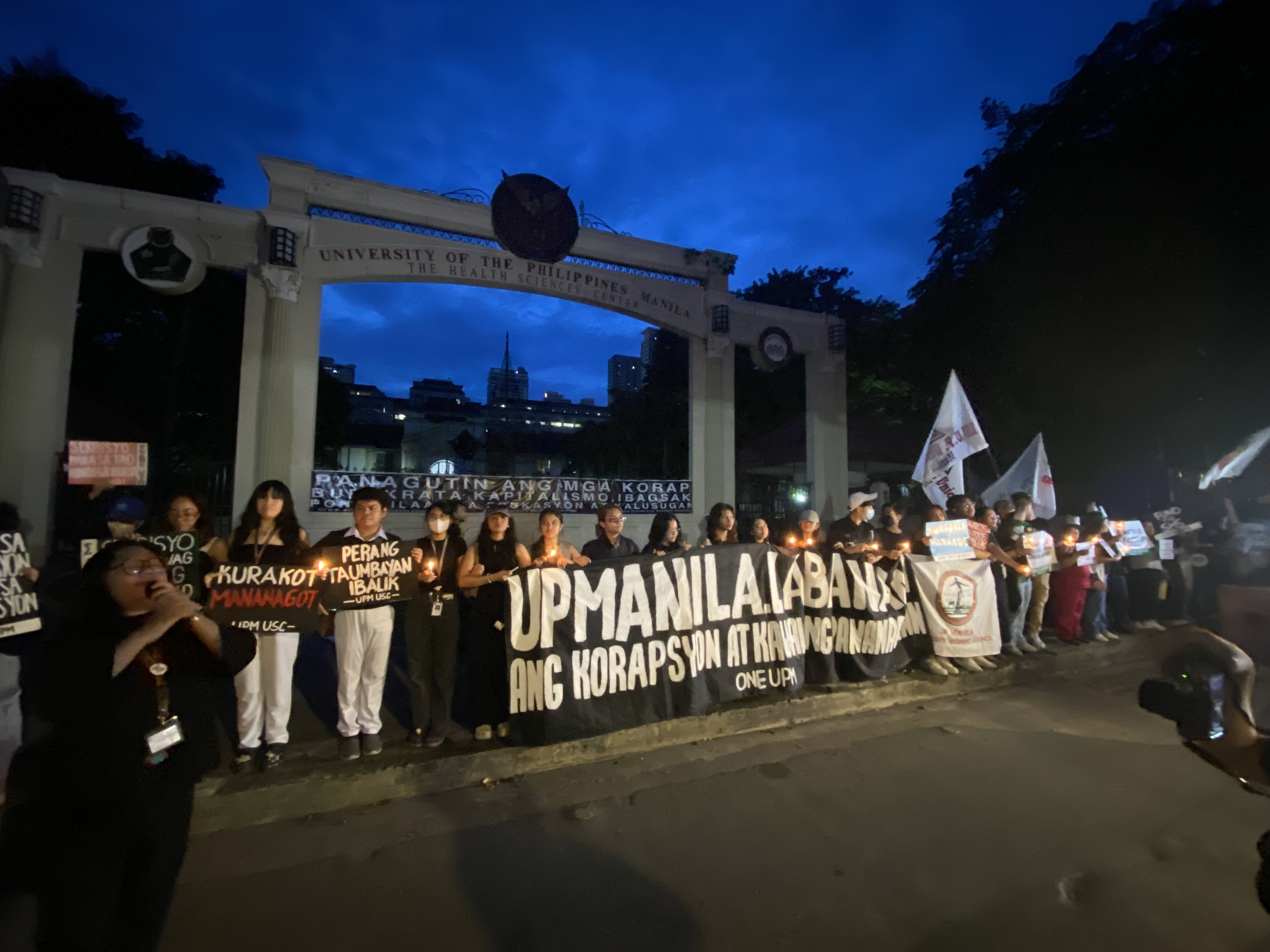
A pre-September 21 Black Friday Protest held by UP Manila chapters of Anakbayan and LFS.

A "Black Friday" walkout was held by thousands of faculty, students and staff of the University of the Philippines, particularly in the UP Diliman and in the University of the Philippines Manila. Over 3,000 from UP Diliman students, faculty, staff and community joined the protests, making it the largest mass gathering action since the COVID-19 pandemic in the university. Series of walkouts were staged by student governments and national-democratic mass organizations such as League of Filipino Students (LFS) also among various campuses.

=== September 6 ===
On September 6, several groups marched from the EDSA Shrine in Ortigas Center up to the People Power Monument on EDSA to protest the alleged corruption in nationwide flood control projects.

=== September 7 ===
Over 500 people took part in the Marikina City leg of Takbo Laban sa Korapsyon to protest corruption in government infrastructure projects. Sarah Elago of Gabriela Women's Party joined the run. On the same day, 150 cyclists from Youth Advocates for Climate Action Philippines and other groups joined the #KontrakTOUR Bike Protest Against Corruption from Quezon City Hall to Luneta Park in Manila.

=== September 8 ===
Students from Bulacan State University staged a campus "walkout" on September 8 to protest alleged corruption in government projects. The activity was joined by around 300 participants, including students, faculty members, youth organizations, and representatives from marginalized sections.

Transport group Pagkakaisa ng mga Samahan ng Tsuper at Operator Nationwide (Piston) staged a nationwide strike to protest corruption, explaining how floods result in a loss of livelihood and additional expenses for jeepney drivers and their families.

=== September 9 ===
Over 7,000 students joined in the UP Los Baños walkout on September 19. This was considered as the biggest protest inside the university in history. Before the protest, local colleges held their separate protests before merging.

=== September 10 ===
Local residents of Hagonoy, Bulacan, held a protest on 3.9-foot-high (1.2 m) high tide water that engulfed many areas in the town and in the towns plaza to protest the failed flood control projects in the town.

In Baguio City, a city-wide walkout was staged by students of Saint Louis University where it was participated by local chapters of Anakbayan, Bahaghari, Innabuyog-Gabriela Youth, Kabataan Partylist, and National Union of Students of the Philippines (NUSP). Students wore black and chanted "Marcos singilin, Duterte panagutin!" (Charge Marcos, hold Duterte accountable!). They said that "accountability must extend to President Bongbong Marcos, as he himself signed the budget that enabled these corrupt schemes; he bears primary responsibility." The protest was staged as a build-up for the September 21 protests.

=== September 11 ===
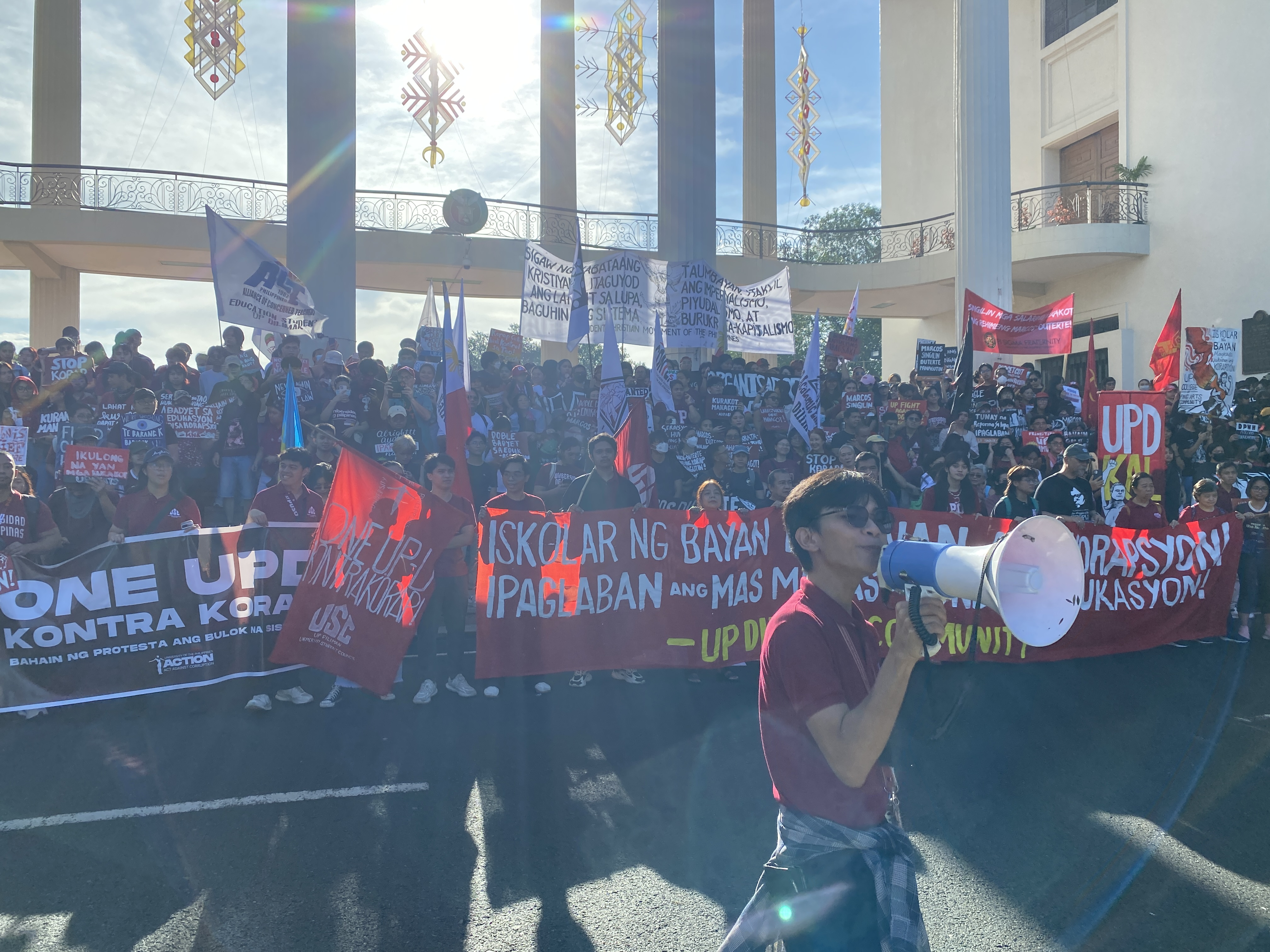
Students of University of the Philippines going to Luneta on the morning of September 21.

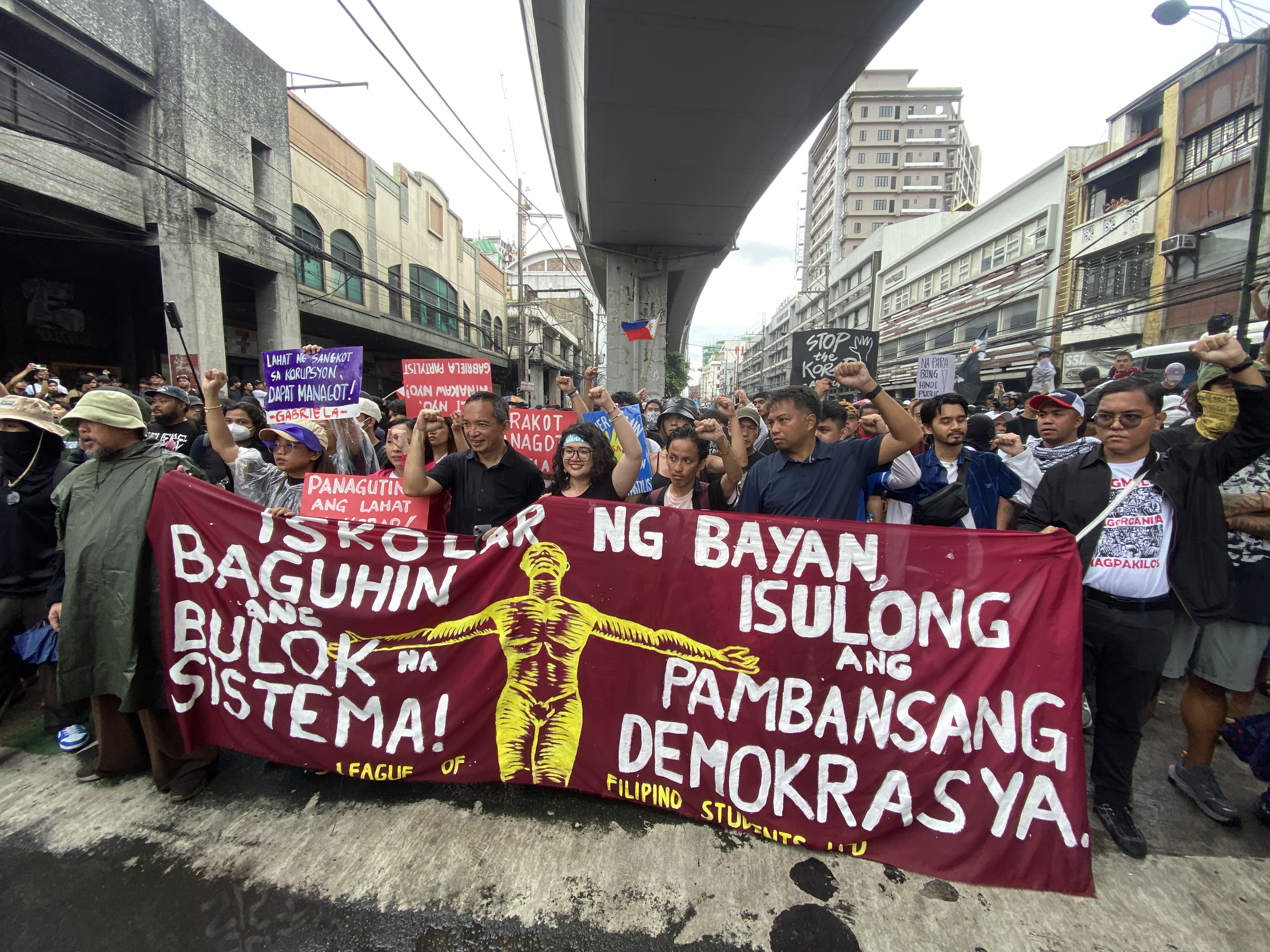
BAYAN and Makabayan leaders near Mendiola.

A series of mass demonstrations around the country were held on Sunday, September 21. The date of the rally, September 11, coincides with the anniversary of the imposition of martial law by President Ferdinand Marcos in 1972, a symbolic choice for groups emphasizing democratic rights and government accountability.

Ahead of the rallies, the Philippine National Police placed Metro Manila under full alert, suspending leave for officers and preparing road closures near Rizal Park, EDSA, and other strategic sites. Authorities stated that no specific security threats had been identified as of mid-September 2025. Malacañang Palace Press Officer Claire Castro warned that certain actors "may try to exploit this legitimate cause for their own personal interests and to undermine the government."

The largest protests were held in Metro Manila: the Baha sa Luneta in Rizal Park, and the Trillion Peso March in the EDSA Shrine. Organizers described the two rallies as complementary and encouraged participation in either or both protests. Both events have avoided calling for the removal of President Bongbong Marcos and Vice President Sara Duterte, welcoming all groups opposed to corruption regardless of political affiliation. Bayan chairperson Teodoro Casiño warned against "vested interests" calling for the removal of Marcos and Duterte, while Akbayan representative Perci Cendaña noted that Marcos' resignation may benefit Duterte. In response, Anakbayan National Chairperson Mhing Gomez said that there must be no compromises—more than the removal of both Marcos and Duterte, it is the system that must be changed.

Several government officials have expressed support for the protests. President Marcos expressed his support for the protests, stating that he understands their anger and would likely join them if he were not president. DPWH Secretary Vince Dizon expressed his full support for rallies that condemn government corruption, responding to ongoing anti-corruption demonstrations. Vice President Duterte, who flew to visit OFW communities in Japan, also voiced her support for the protests, calling on the government to listen. Defense Secretary Gilbert Teodoro and Armed Forces chief of staff Romeo Brawner Jr. issued a joint statement affirming the armed forces' non-partisanship and professionalism, emphasizing that the 160,000-member institution follows the Constitution and operates under the chain of command, after a rally speaker urged the military to end its loyalty to Marcos and called for a non-violent "people power" movement.

During the rallies, Duterte supporters who were gathered near Gate 4 of Camp Aguinaldo had a brief scuffle with other protesters attending the Trillion Peso March. They had been calling for President Marcos's resignation in addition to their general pronouncements against corruption. Among those who attended the anti-Marcos rally were retired military officers led by Romeo Poquiz, a former general in the Air Force. In later weeks, Armed Forces Chief of Staff Romeo Brawner Jr. admitted to being visited by Poquiz and seven other retired military officers at Camp Aguinaldo in the evening before September 21, with them calling for the military's withdrawal of support for president Marcos and initiating a "soft coup" in order to solve corruption. Brawner denied their proposal, citing the military's allegiance to the constitution. The administration has since deemed their actions seditious and treasonous, although president Marcos was noted to have been unbothered by the retired generals' actions.

==== Luneta Park ====
Rizal Park became one of the primary venues for the September 11 mass demonstrations. The activities around Luneta were collectively referred to as "Baha sa Luneta" (transl. "Flood in Luneta"), a name first adopted by civic groups such as Artikulo Onse: Citizens' War Against Corruption and Sanlakas, who had also referred to the planned event as the "Billion Peso March".

Protesters gathered at the Luneta Park on Sunday in a program led by the group Taumbayan Ayaw sa Magnanakaw at Abusado Network Alliance (transl. "People Against Thieves and Abusers Network Alliance"), or TAMA NA. Students from the University of the Philippines Manila marched to the Luneta rally. The main program began at 9:00 a.m. at Rizal Park (Luneta) in Manila. The pedestrian crossing in front of the Rizal Monument drew thousands of participants, including first-time demonstrators as well as representatives from various sectoral and church groups.

About 49,000 people were in the park by 10 a.m., according to Manila Public Information Office. The number of protesters swelled to about 100,000.

Civic organizations that participated included the Gabriela Women's Party, Health Alliance for Democracy, and Karapatan. Among the performers and personalities at the rally were drag performers Pura Luka Vega, Gabriela She Lang, and Maria Cristina, who led the Harong Queens in a performance. Miss Philippines Earth Joy Barcoma also took part, heading a group of volunteers in post-rally clean-up efforts. Comedian Jun Sabayton and rapper artists Supafly, Morobeats, and Vitrum also participated. Actresses Angel Aquino, Andrea Brillantes, Maris Racal, Jodi Sta. Maria, and Tessie Tomas were also spotted at the rally, as was indie-rock band Lola Amour. Student performers from the University of the Philippines staged a performance covered in mud. UP Repertory Company manager Seah Antalan stated that the act was meant to "reclaim the narrative of the people", contrasting it with displays of privilege. Some protesters waved the Straw Hat Pirates' Jolly Roger from the manga series One Piece, a symbol of rebellion against corruption and injustice similar to flags seen in demonstrations in Indonesia and Nepal weeks earlier.

==== EDSA Shrine ====
Led by Tindig Pilipinas, Catholic Educational Association of the Philippines, Clergy for Good Governance, and other religious groups, protesters gathered at the EDSA Shrine to conduct the Trillion Peso March demonstration. The number of protesters were about 70,000.

Comedian and television host Vice Ganda addressed the rally at the People Power Monument, urging President Bongbong Marcos to take action against government officials accused of corruption and expressing support for reinstating the death penalty for those allegedly involved in questionable flood control projects. Other public figures, including Ogie Alcasid, Iza Calzado, Anne Curtis, and Catriona Gray, were also present at the event. Former Ilocos Sur governor Chavit Singson also attended, but was booed by protesters who called him a "plunderer". The band Ben&Ben performed their single "Kapangyarihan" (lit. 'Power'), a song about accountability.

Some Pinoy pop and OPM artists did not participate in the rally but expressed support through social media. SB19 members Josh Cullen and Pablo Nase posted a video of themselves singing a portion of Ben&Ben's "Kapangyarihan". The girl group Bini released a statement on X, with individual members also posting on their own accounts. Other groups such as G22 and Kaia referenced their song "Tanga" (transl. Fool). Filipino singer-songwriter Maki posted in solidarity, while Katseye member Sofia Laforteza shared on Instagram her call for "a future built on truth, integrity, and hope". Other artists who either participated in the rally or spoke online were R&B artist Denise Julia, pop-rock band Cup of Joe (which jokingly referred their song "Multo" to the said scandal, but also spread their message on social media while performing at a gig in Iligan), bassist Coey Ballesteros of the band Hey June! (who personally attended the rally while seeing rallyists' placards using a reference to the band's hit single "Lasik"), and alt-rock band Over October.

In the afternoon, the protests at the People Power Monument and White Plains Avenue spilled over onto EDSA, leading to the closure of all northbound lanes including the service road. In response, the Metropolitan Manila Development Authority redirected all Ortigas Interchange service road traffic towards Ortigas Avenue, while the Department of Transportation temporarily opened the EDSA Busway to all types of vehicles coming from the northbound flyover to Santolan. The northbound lanes of EDSA were made open to traffic again around 6 p.m. PST.

==== Morayta ====
The September Twenty-One People's Movement Against Corruption, a coalition of pro-administration civic and reform-oriented groups gathered at Morayta at 4:00 PM, calling for Marcos and the Independent Commission for Infrastructure to end corruption.

==== Other cities around the country ====
Planned demonstrations were reported at Plaza Independencia in Cebu City and a march from Jaro Plaza to the provincial capitol in Iloilo City. A rally was also scheduled at the public plaza in Bacolod.

In Cebu City, dozens of protesters, primarily students and youth, gathered at Fuente Osmeña Circle at 8:30 a.m. PST before marching along Osmeña Boulevard. The rally lasted for about two hours. A separate rally was held by pro-Duterte protesters at Plaza Independencia, calling for President Marcos' resignation.

In Davao City, pro-Duterte groups roasted 100 cows as an "offering to the heavens" against corruption in a prayer rally organized by Vice President Duterte. The sacrificial slaughtering was condemned by the Philippine Animal Welfare Society.

Similar protests were also held in Legazpi, Laoag, Tuguegarao, San Fernando, Olongapo, Baguio, Pangasinan, Dumaguete, Cagayan de Oro, and Butuan.

In Baguio City, more than 5,000 protested composed of youth, church, and workers' groups. Those who spoke included Joanna Cariño of the Cordillera People's Alliance and public health worker Beth Solang who called out the government amidst unfinished healthcare facilities, understaffed healthcare systems, and underpaid healthcare workers.

==== Violent demonstrations along Mendiola Street, Recto Avenue and Ayala Boulevard ====
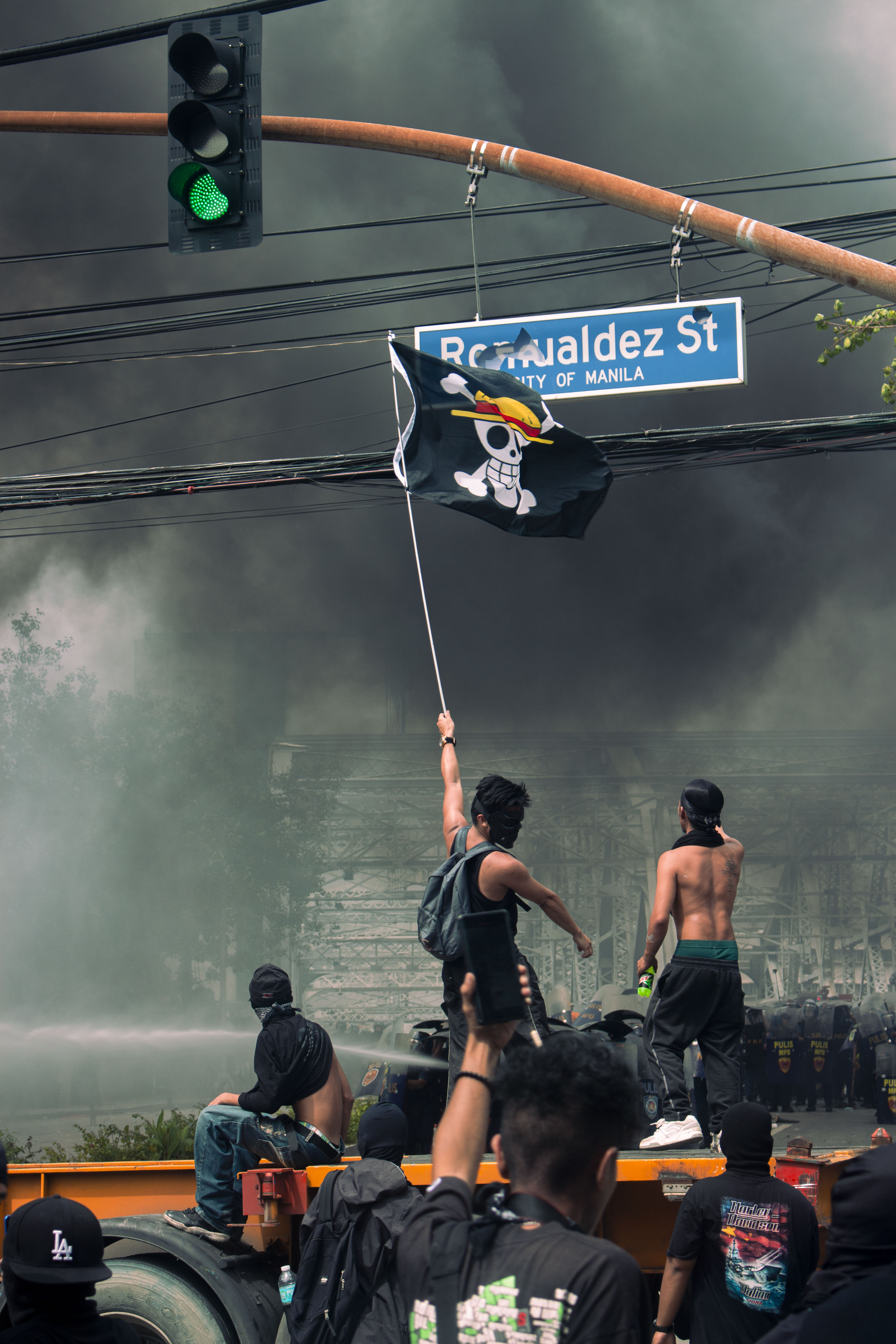
Protesters wave the Straw Hats' Jolly Roger flag in Manila, September 11, 2025

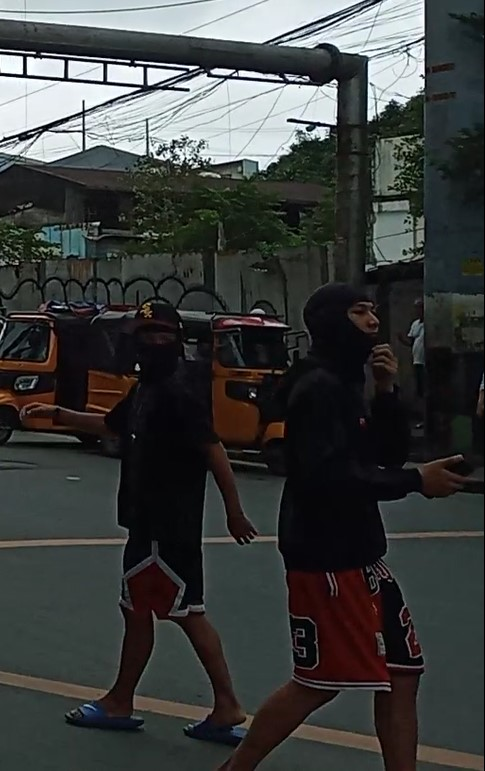
Two masked rioters near Ayala bridge in Manila, September 21, 2025

While protests nationwide were relatively peaceful, violent demonstrations occurred along Mendiola Street, Recto Avenue and Ayala Boulevard in Manila. Police reported that protesters in Mendiola threw improvised incendiary devices, including Molotov cocktails, which injured at least 39 officers. Alongside these confrontations, media also reported scattered incidents of property damage such as burning tires and barricades during face-offs between security forces and demonstrators. Demonstrators engaged in violent confrontations with police and ignited a trailer truck on Ayala Bridge in Manila, also setting fire to several motorcycles including some belonging to the PNP. A group of protesters in masks violently demonstrated along Recto Avenue by setting fires in the middle of the street, hurling stones, human waste, and objects at police officers, and attacking several nearby establishments including ransacking a Sogo Hotel branch. The PNP accused rioters of stealing firearms from police officers. Reports vary on testimonies regarding small explosions heard during confrontations between the authorities and rallyists in Mendiola. The SWAT team eventually resorted to sporadically opening fire, resulting in the death of Eric Saber. Some of them even helped the Sogo Hotel employees beat up a minor. None of the initial police officers assigned to crowd control held firearms, while a SWAT team later arrived carrying firearms and was seen using tear gas by eyewitnesses.

Supporters of Rodrigo Duterte were reported to have attempted a march from their protest venue in Liwasang Bonifacio to Mendiola, intending to move their rally to nearby Malacañang Palace and call for President Marcos' resignation, but halted their march due to the rioters along Recto.

Seventeen individuals were arrested for throwing rocks at riot police and igniting barricade tires, as reported by local authorities. Less than an hour later, police deployed a water cannon against another group of masked protesters. Some officers retaliated by throwing rocks back at the demonstrators. Manila Mayor Isko Moreno stated that police officers were injured during the confrontations and are currently receiving medical care. Photojournalists who documented the event also reported beatings and harassment of rallyists and bystanders committed by the police; photojournalist Zedrich Xylak Madrid himself was hit by police officers, while attempts were made by officers in preventing Reuters photojournalist Liza Marie David from taking photographs.

Mark Chustin Serbo, a 15-year-old protester from Taguig who participated in the violent demonstration, was fatally stabbed by a 52-year-old watch technician after attempting to set fire to a police motorcycle near the latter's shop; he was initially reported to have been the lone casualty during the incident, having been declared dead on arrival upon being brought to the Jose R. Reyes Memorial Medical Center (JRRMMC). Serbo's parents had no prior knowledge of his participation in the Manila rally, only being told by Serbo that he was going out for a Sunday afternoon with friends. The technician later surrendered to Manila police and apologized, claiming to have panicked and blanked out in committing the attack amidst the violence.

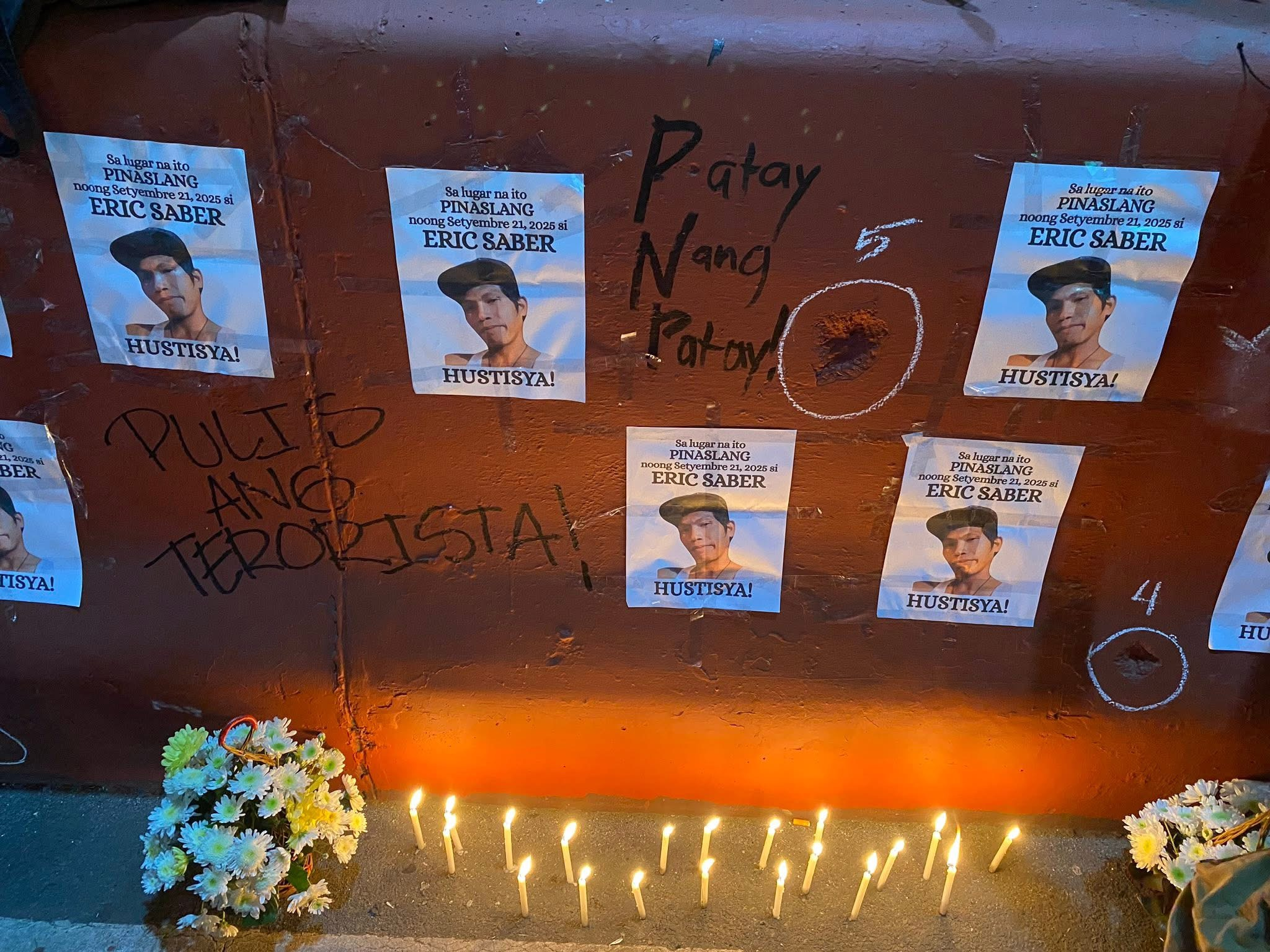
Activists and concerned citizens condemned the police and offered a memorial to Eric Saber, a by-stander construction worker, was said to have been shot and killed by the police on the aftermath of Baha sa Luneta September 11 anti-corruption protests.

Eric Q. Saber, a 35-year-old construction worker from Paracale, Camarines Norte, was going home from work in Pasay when he was fatally shot during the riots. According to Bulatlat and AlterMidya, he had been crossing Recto Avenue to ride a jeepney when SWAT officers fired shots in his direction, resulting in a stray bullet hitting his neck; a spinal injury caused by the bullet wound was later confirmed by forensic pathologist Raquel Fortun. Saber was soon brought to the JRRMMC, but died two days later from pneumonia as a result of his gunshot wound.

According to the police, 224 individuals were arrested during a protest against corruption, which resulted in 131 police officers and 57 civilians getting injured. The MPD reported arrests at various locations: 51 at Ayala Bridge (38 adults, 13 minors), 21 at Mendiola (14 adults, 7 minors), and 41 at Recto (13 adults, 28 minors). Among the injured police, eight had lacerations, with nine hospitalized for observation and one possibly needing admission for a nasal fracture, according to police. Among the injured civilians, 48 were hospitized to Jose Reyes Memorial Medical Center. According to the National Union of People's Lawyers (NUPL), police tortured detainees at the police tent at Mendiola and at the MPD headquarters. The NUPL also said that police made several detainees beat up other detainees, while some detainees were being forced to give false confessions.

The violent demonstrations were estimated to have resulted in ₱10.4 million (US$211,167.51) in damage to both public infrastructure and private property. The International Coalition for Human Rights in the Philippines described the mass arrests and violent dispersal as human rights violations.

Karapatan stated on September 22 that detainees were not given food and water, with many of them injured and had no place to lie down. Police allegedly took bites out of hamburgers that lawyers brought for the children in detention. Karapatan said that police officers could be held liable under the Philippine Anti-Torture Act. Some people were detained without charges for longer than the 36 hours that Philippine laws allow for arrests without warrants.

A report by human rights group Amnesty International stated that police used "unnecessary and excessive force" and are guilty of torture and other human rights violations. A 20-year old protester testified that he was assaulted by plainclothes officers and later punched, kicked and beaten by police with truncheons until he passed out. He was again beaten in an ambulance until reporters arrived. Three teenage brothers who did not take part in the protest were beaten by police with truncheons and then accused of assaulting police.

Public Interest Law Center and Sentro para sa Tunay na Repormang Agraryo said that those arrested had bruises, fractures, and other signs of torture, and that some minors were coerced to beat other minors. Injured protesters who were arrested were not given medical treatment.

The police subsequently issued subpoenas to student leaders as part of its investigation on the Mendiola protests, where police used sonic weapons, tear gas, and water cannons against protesters and passersby. Student council leaders and university officials condemned the police for issuing subpoenas and harassing students. The NUPL said the subpoenas aim to threaten people to prevent them from exercising their right to free expression, peaceful assembly and redress of grievances".

There were journalists who were assaulted by police or prevented from covering the September 11 protests. The Foreign Correspondents Association of the Philippines and the Presidential Task Force on Media Security protested these attacks against journalists. Commission on Human Rights said it will probe reports of harassment against journalists and the use of police force on protesters.

Virtual rallies on online game platforms such as Roblox were also organized by Filipino users. The websites of 19 government agencies were defaced by hackers during the protests.

Journalist Manuel Mogato remarked that the violence along the areas was an isolated incident among the peaceful nationwide demonstrations, noting that both protesters and police authorities were markedly more restrained than during the dictatorial presidency of Ferdinand Marcos in the 1970s and 1980s. University of the Philippines Diliman journalism professor Danilo Arao did not just consider the Sep 21 rallies as culminating activities but also a time for all citizens, not just journalists, to carry out their patriotic duty to "fact check everything."

In October 2025, human rights advocates and families of those arrested organized Alyansa laban sa Korapsyon at Brutalidad ng Pulis (AKAB) to support victims of police brutality and to protest government corruption.

==== Overseas ====
Smaller gatherings were also held in cities outside the Philippines in solidarity with the September 21 protests including in Sydney and Melbourne, Australia. Overseas chapters of Anakbayan, Bayan, Migrante, and Gabriela lead and participated in protests and other activities of overseas Filipinos and foreigners in solidarity in cities in Australia, United States, Europe, HongKong, Japan, Canada, New Zealand, and the Middle East on various dates.

=== September 12 ===
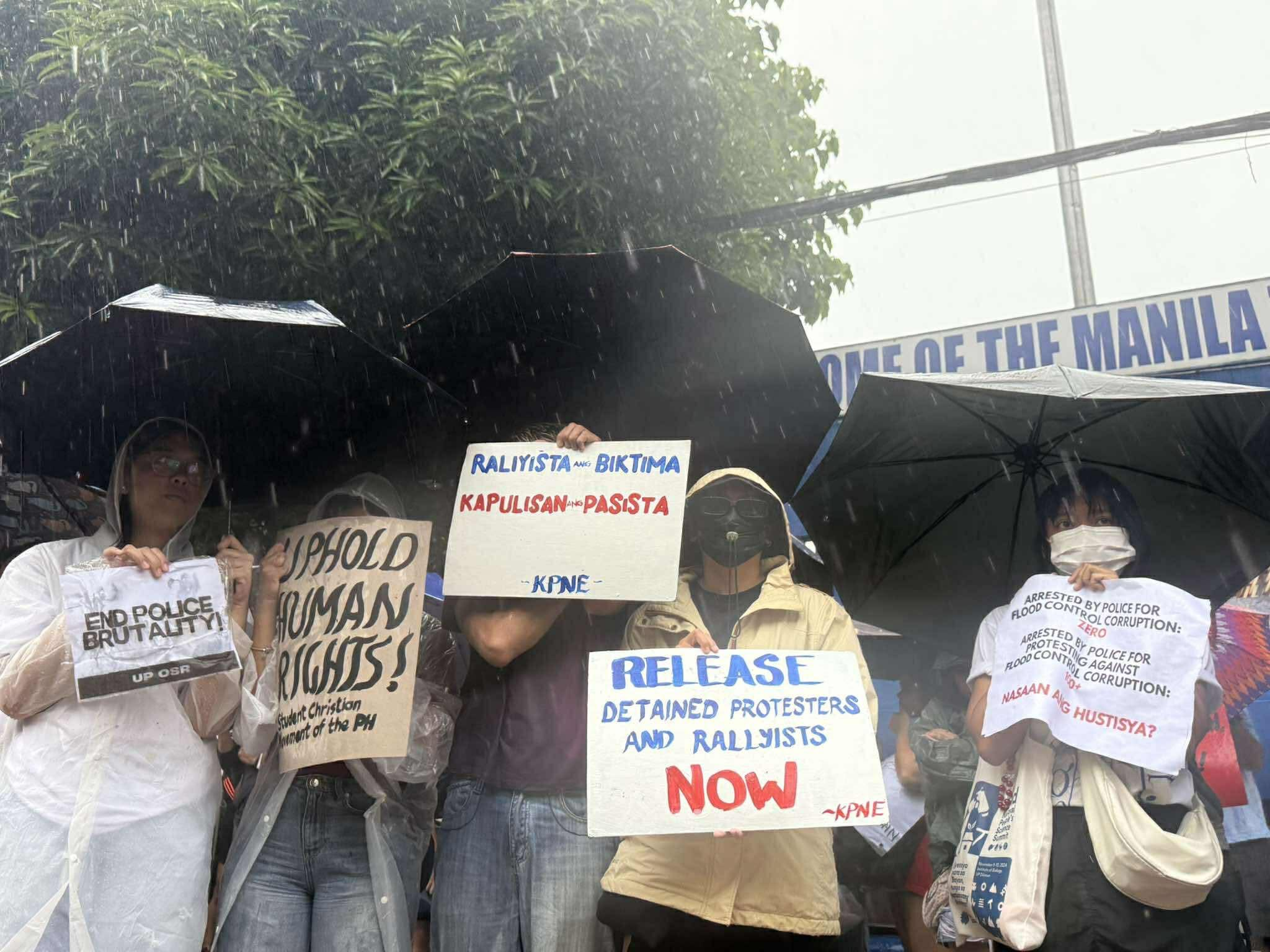
Loved ones of those detained and progressive groups in solidarity protested in front of the Manila Police District Headquarters against police brutality and corruption.

On September 12, it was reported that schools were closed and a curfew was declared for minors. Samahan ng Progresibong Kabataan (SPARK) staged a protest at Camp Crame, headquarters of the Philippine National Police, for the alleged police brutality following the arrest of the rioters on September 21. The Communist Party of the Philippines (CPP) released a statement supporting the protests, and connected the political unrest to recent protests in Indonesia, Nepal, and Kenya.

Loved ones and members of progressive groups such as Kalikasan launched a protest in front of the MPD Headquarters in order to condemn police response on September 11, for the release of the detained, and to continuously condemn corruption.

A day after the protests, the shares of the PSE Composite Index (PSEi) slumped on September 12, 2025, as investor confidence in the market dampened amidst the impact of the flood control scandal. The PSEi finished trading lower by 0.79 percent to 6,214.83 while the broader PSE All Shares Index ended lower by 0.31 percent to 3,729.29. Market analysts also noted other factors that weighed on investor sentiment, including cautious reactions prior to speeches by US Federal Reserve officials and profit-taking measures following previous market gains.

=== September 13 ===
Hundreds of students walked out at the Ateneo de Davao University in protest against corruption. University president Fr. Karel San Juan spoke at the mobilization.

=== September 14 ===
Black Friday protests were held by the Concerned Artists of the Philippines along the MRT Station, Cubao, Quezon City and by the students of the Notre Dame of Marbel University from Alunan Avenue to South Cotabato Sports Complex, Koronadal City.

=== September 15 ===
The civil society group Tindig Paombong organized a protest in Paombong, Bulacan, to raise concerns over alleged corruption and the quality of flood control projects in the town, which residents claimed had contributed worsening flood in their communities. Issues related to Paombong's water supply largely provided by PrimeWater, a company that has faced criticism for service deficiencies, were also highlighted. The protest concluded in front of the municipal hall of Paombong where students, local leaders, and representatives of various organizations delivered speeches. The event was estimated have drawn around 500 participants from different parts of Bulacan.

=== September 18 ===
Students from the University of Santo Tomas (UST) and Far Eastern University (FEU) staged walkouts in Manila, both led by student councils and university chapters of chapters of Kabataan Partylist, Anakbayan, and LFS. At FEU, the demonstration titled "Tamaraws, Unite! Walkout For Our Rights!" took place along Nicanor Reyes Street and was organized by student councils and youth groups. Participants raised their concerns over blended learning setup, rising tuition fees, and called for greater transparency in school policies. The protests also addressed broader issues including corruption, police brutality, and democratic rights in the Philippines. Student leaders condemned the denial of other media and government authorities of the police brutality in response to the September 11 riots.

KMU and other groups rallied outside the headquarters of the Philippine National Police in condemnation of police violence during the September 11 anti-corruption demonstrations in Manila.

=== September 26 ===
On September 26, students from Bulacan State University held the protest "Kick Back Kontra Korap" (transl. Kick Back Anti-Corrupt). The march began at their main campus and passed by the Bulacan Capitol and Malolos City Hall but was cut short before reaching the office of First District Representative Danilo Domingo. The students called on Governor Daniel Fernando and Mayor Christian Natividad to support demands for justice for flood victims, pointing to alleged irregularities in flood control projects linked to DPWH. Nearly one thousand students joined the rally.

=== October 4 ===
Thousands of teachers staged a classroom walkout to protest the corruption in government infrastructure projects. Protesters criticized the militarization of school campuses, low wages for teachers, and the government leaving classrooms and flood control projects unfinished. The Alliance of Concerned Teachers called for an increase in teachers' salaries, raising the budget for education, and the prosecution of corrupt government officials. Attendees of TWICE's This Is For concert at the Philippine Arena in Bulacan were also chanting "Ikulong na yan mga kurakot" before the concert proper.

=== October 6 ===
On October 6, students from De La Salle University staged a walkout in front of St. La Salle Hall where more than 1,500 participated. Organizers included the University Student Government, Lasallians Against Corruption, and the university chapter of Anakbayan. Teddy Casiño became one of the speakers of the mobilization. In Miagao, Iloilo more than 800 students, faculty, and staff participated in the walkout led by the Pamatan-on Kontra Korapsyon (PAKK), groups called for accountability and greater budget for education.

=== October 8 ===
On October 8, students from the University of the East conducted a walkout where UE student and social media personality Awra Briguela participated and echoed the anti-corruption sentiments of the students.

=== October 9 ===
On October 9, Our Lady of Fatima University Quezon City campus students staged a walkout.

=== October 10 ===
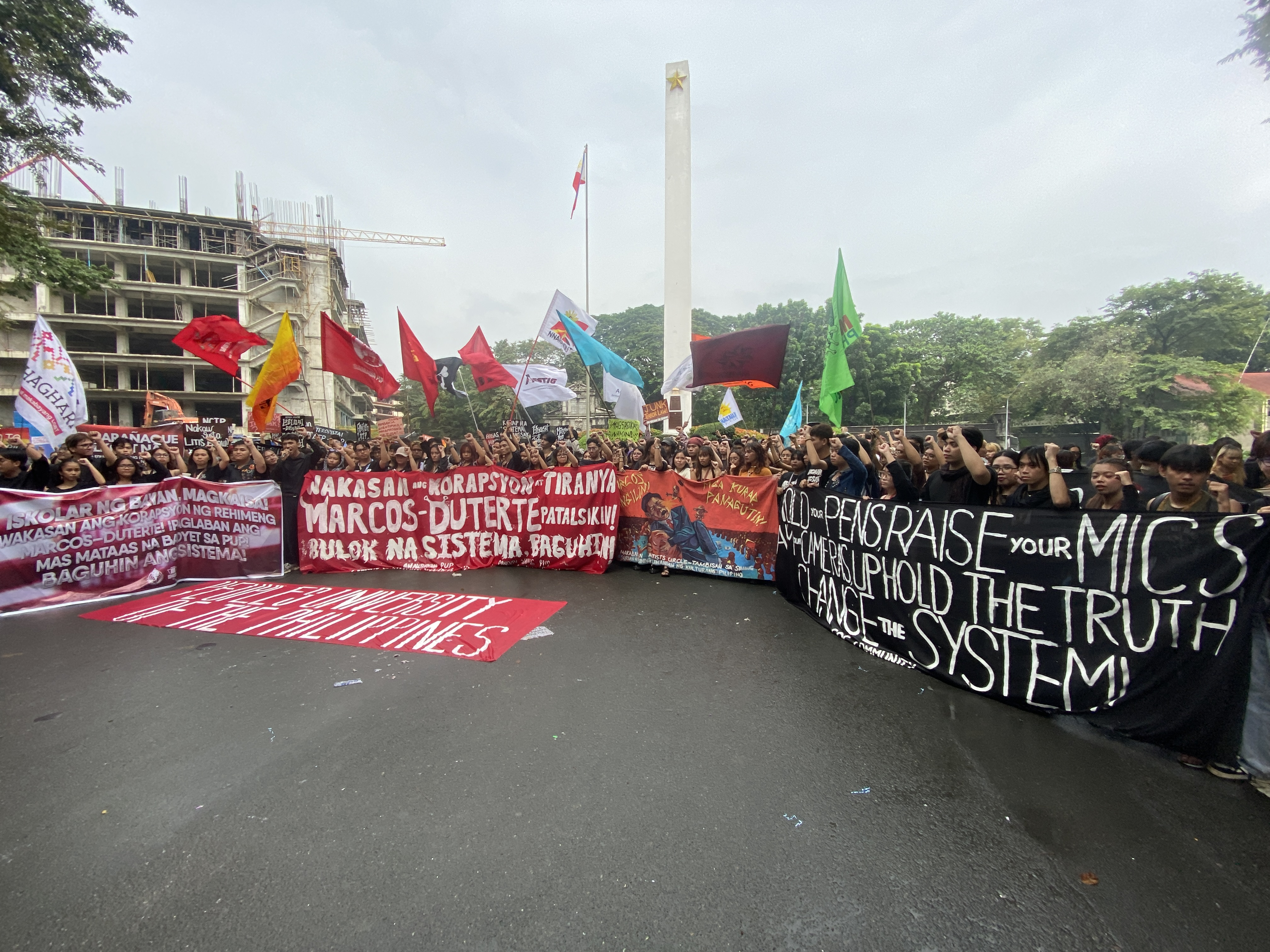

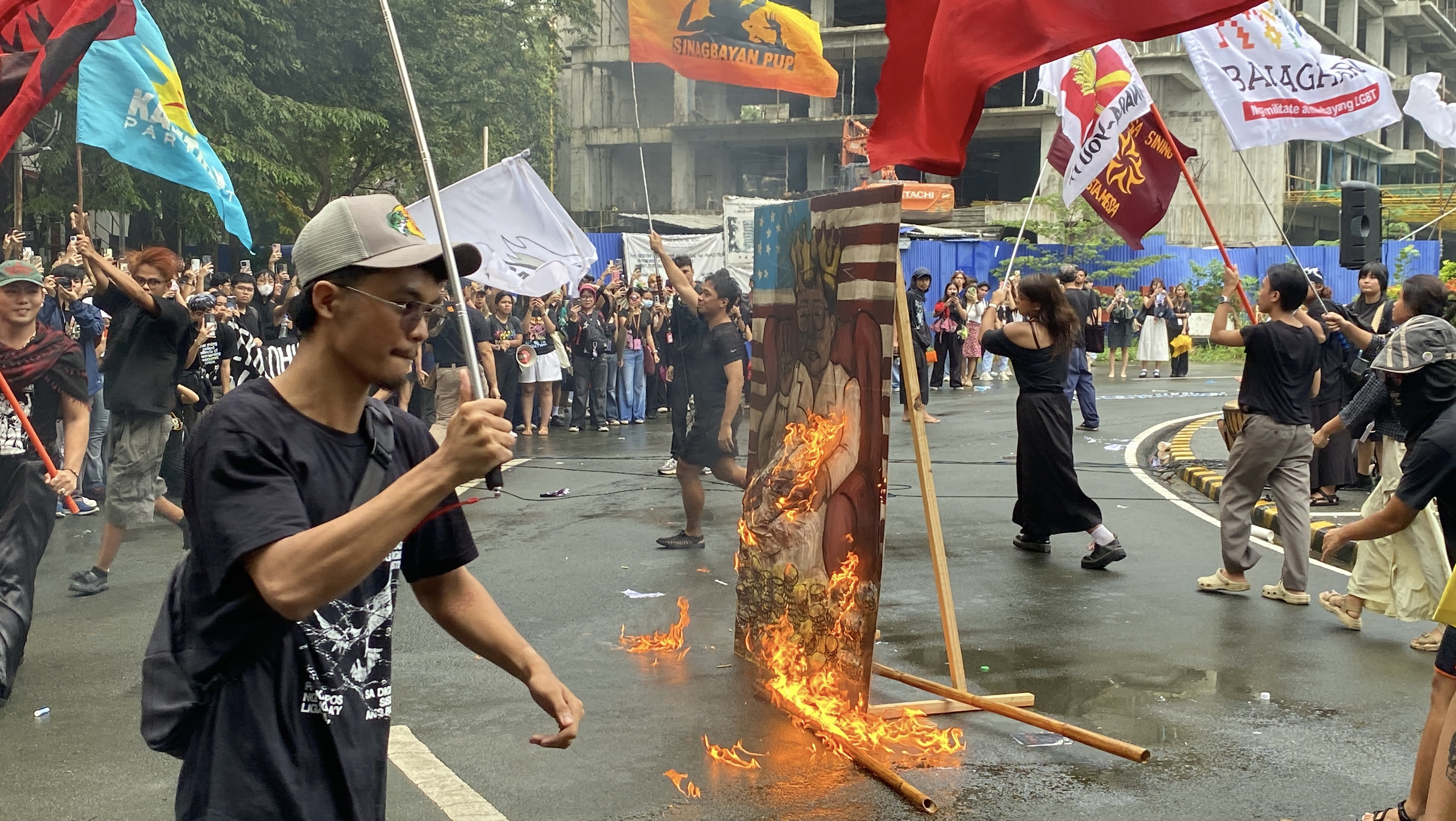
On October 10, 15,000 students of the Polytechnic University of the Philippines walked out and burned an effigy of President Marcos Jr.

On October 10, Students from the Polytechnic University of the Philippines launched a system-wide walkout where more than 15,000 students participated, according to the Office of the Student Regent. They staged a walkout in order to seriously condemn anomalous flood control projects and the lack of government accountability. Students condemned the effects of corruption on their university, like budget cuts and the long-unfinished DPWH-project North Wing building. Unions of sanitation workers and teachers also joined the students during the protest action.

At the end of the program, student leader John Paul "JP" Azusano, on behalf of SAMASA PUP, together with chapters of Anakbayan, League of Filipino Students (LFS), Panday Sining, Kabataan Partylist, and other mass organizations, called for genuine systemic change and the removal of President Ferdinand "Bongbong" Marcos Jr., Vice President Sara Duterte, and all corrupt politicians. In his speech, Azusano criticized the government for the university's budget deficit, as well as for state attacks and the illegal detention of student leaders during the September 21 anti-corruption protest, while noting that corrupt politicians remain free and unaccountable. He concluded his address with a call for the ouster of President Marcos Jr., which coincided with the burning of an effigy representing the President.

=== October 12 ===
On October 12–13, Representative Kiko Barzaga (Cavite–4th) led a protest outside Forbes Park in Makati from the evening of October 12 and ended early morning of the next day. The demonstration was attended by 300 people. The protesters demanded President Marcos Jr. to resign.

Protest leaders questioned the actions of Barzaga, saying that his actions were just mere antics and that it is hypocritical for the likes of Barzaga to be anti-corruption for supporting other corrupt officials and being part of a political dynasty that sports a lavish life. Anakbayan Chairperson Mhing Gomez said that he is just diverting the anger of the people, for he did not criticize the 2026 budget that contains unprogrammed appropriations.

=== October 17 ===
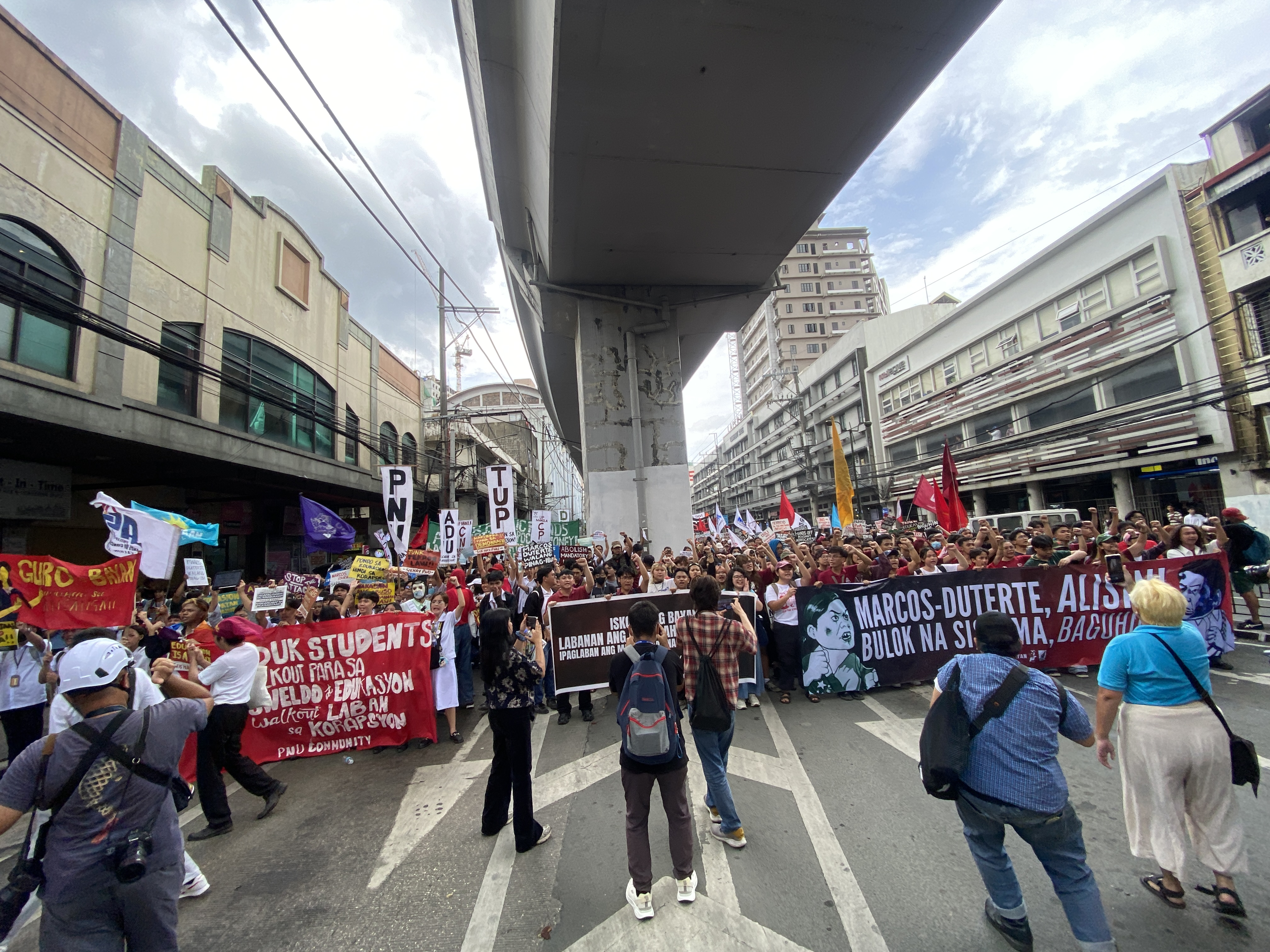
More than 5,000 youth participated in an October 17 protest at Mendiola led by Anakbayan and other groups. The mobilization called for the removal of both President Marcos Jr. and Vice President Duterte.

On October 17, a National Day of Action against Corruption was spearheaded by groups such as Anakbayan, UP Act Against Corruption Network (UP ACTION), NUSP, and Kabataan Partylist, where more than 5,000 youth and students from many schools and universities of the National Capital Region participated in a mass mobilization in Mendiola. Congresswoman Renee Co of Kabataan Partylist said that President Marcos Jr. cannot escape accuntability since more than 9,000 flood control projects were done since 2022 where more than 4,000 were approved under unprogrammed appropriations. Simultaneous youth actions were launched by Anakbayan chapters in different cities outside Manila, such as the mobilization at the Central Luzon State University. Calls included the removal of both President Marcos Jr. and Vice President Duterte and the change of system.

A Black Friday Protest was launched in Cebu City against corruption and against 'weaponization' of law against those who protested at Region VII DPWH office on September 4, 2025. A subpoena violating Batas Pambansa 880 was previously issued against regional Cebuano leaders because of 'damage' done by their throwing of tomatoes towards the office. The protesters held a banner "Prosecute the corrupt bureaucrat-capitalists, not the protesters."

=== October 19 ===
On October 19, during a UAAP basketball game between La Salle and UP at the Araneta Coliseum, the DLSU Animo Squad and the UP Pep Squad had a joint performance calling for the corrupt to be jailed.

=== October 21 ===
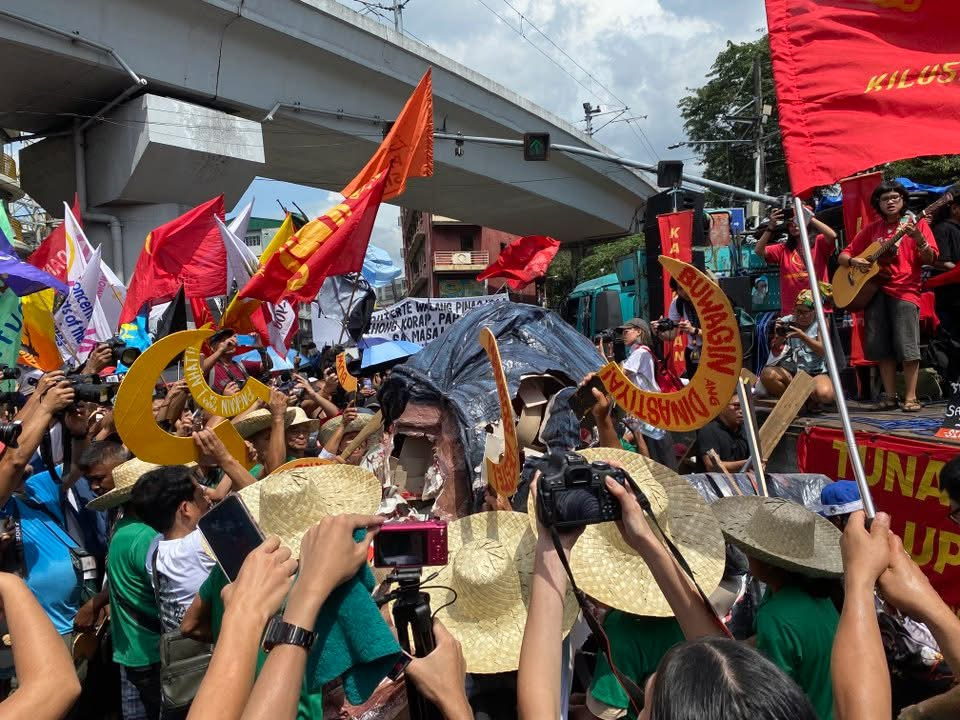
Farmers destroy an effigy of Marcos Jr. being portrayed as a rat pest, October 21, 2025.

Peasant organization Kilusang Magbubukid ng Pilipinas (KMP), together with more than 40 organizations, launched a protest at Mendiola against Marcos Jr., on October 21 against his policies that show that there is no genuine land reform in the country, and that peasant issues have been exacerbated by the worsening corruption in the government. Peasants have been camping out by the gates of the Department of Agrarian Reform for a week. Speakers of the mobilization, former Gabriela Women's Party Representative Liza Maza and KMP Chairperson Danilo Ramos, said that farmers are affected by 'ghost projects' such as corrupted flood control and farm-to-market road projects. KMP Secretary-General Ronnie Manalo denounced the involvement of government officials on corruption while there is a need for farmers in the Philippines for post-disaster relief and compensation as well as facilities like post-harvest machines, dryers, irrigation, and rice mills. He also denounced how government funds are being embezzled, being used for the luxury of government officials. Farmers from as far as Negros, Southern Tagalog, and Central Luzon have condemned at Mendiola issues such as corruption and rampant land conversion. Protesters destroyed an effigy of President Marcos Jr. portrayed as a rat pest.

=== October 23 ===
UP Diliman student leaders led by UPD USC Chairperson Joaquin "Waks" Buenaflor and Mattheo Wovi Villanueva of the Student Christian Movement of the Philippines (SCMP) held a press conference and a subsequent protest against subpoena by the PNP on Buenaflor in relation to the September 21 protest. The students condemned how the PNP has been quick against student activists, but cannot go after corrupt officials. Buenaflor said that those charged should be the contractors and corrupt officials.

=== October 24 ===
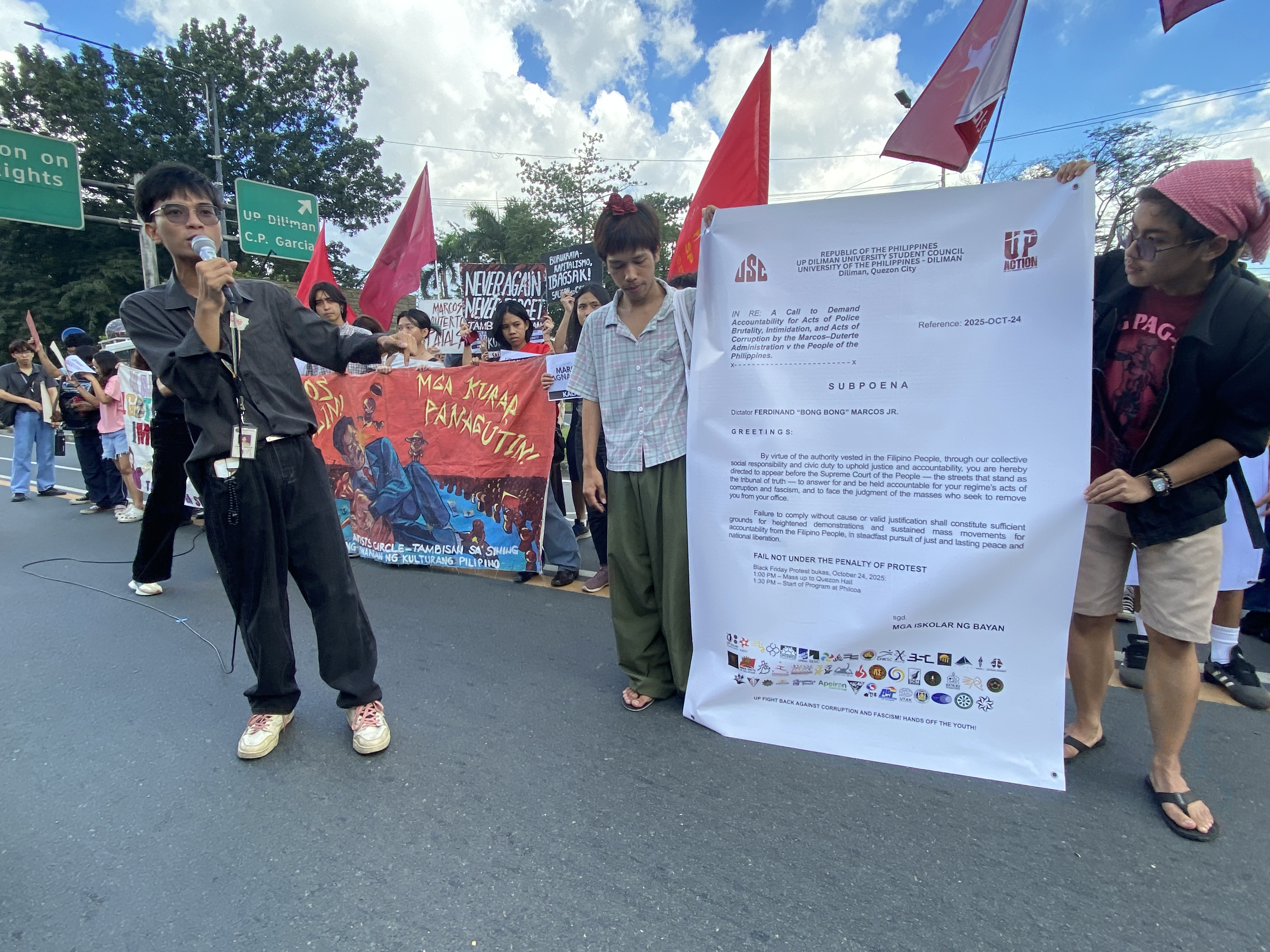
UP Diliman University Student Council Chairperson Joaquin "Waks" Buenaflor presents a 'counter-subpoena' against President Marcos Jr.

Various groups launched 'Black Friday Protests' as part of continued condemnation of corruption under the Marcos Jr. administration on October 24, 2025. Members of People's Surge and KMP barged to the gates of the Department of Energy compound, Bonifacio Global City, Taguig City, where the Independent Commission for Infrastructure headquarters was located. Protesters attempted to open the gate of the compound. Ka Mimi Doringo, condemned the lack of accountability for two months, that urban poor remain homeless and vulnerable.

Later that day, students protested along UP Diliman and Commonwealth Avenue against the subpoena on UPD USC Chairperson Buenaflor while continuously condemning corruption. Protesters presented a 'counter-subpoena' against President Marcos Jr. Buenaflor said that they were "not afraid of a simple subpoena from the Marcos-Duterte regime; instead, we are becoming bolder, and we will even uphold our stand to fight and hold all the corrupt accountable." Students from the Rizal Technological University also staged a walk-out.

=== October 26 ===
Various schools, churches, and multi-sectoral groups in San Miguel, Bulacan held a protest program at Patio Mayor San Miguel Arcangel. The protester sang "Magkaisa" by Vina Morales, composed by Tito Sotto, as part of the event. Students from La Consolacion University Philippines also joined the demonstration in Malolos, which began with a holy mass at the Malolos Cathedral before the march.

=== October 27 ===
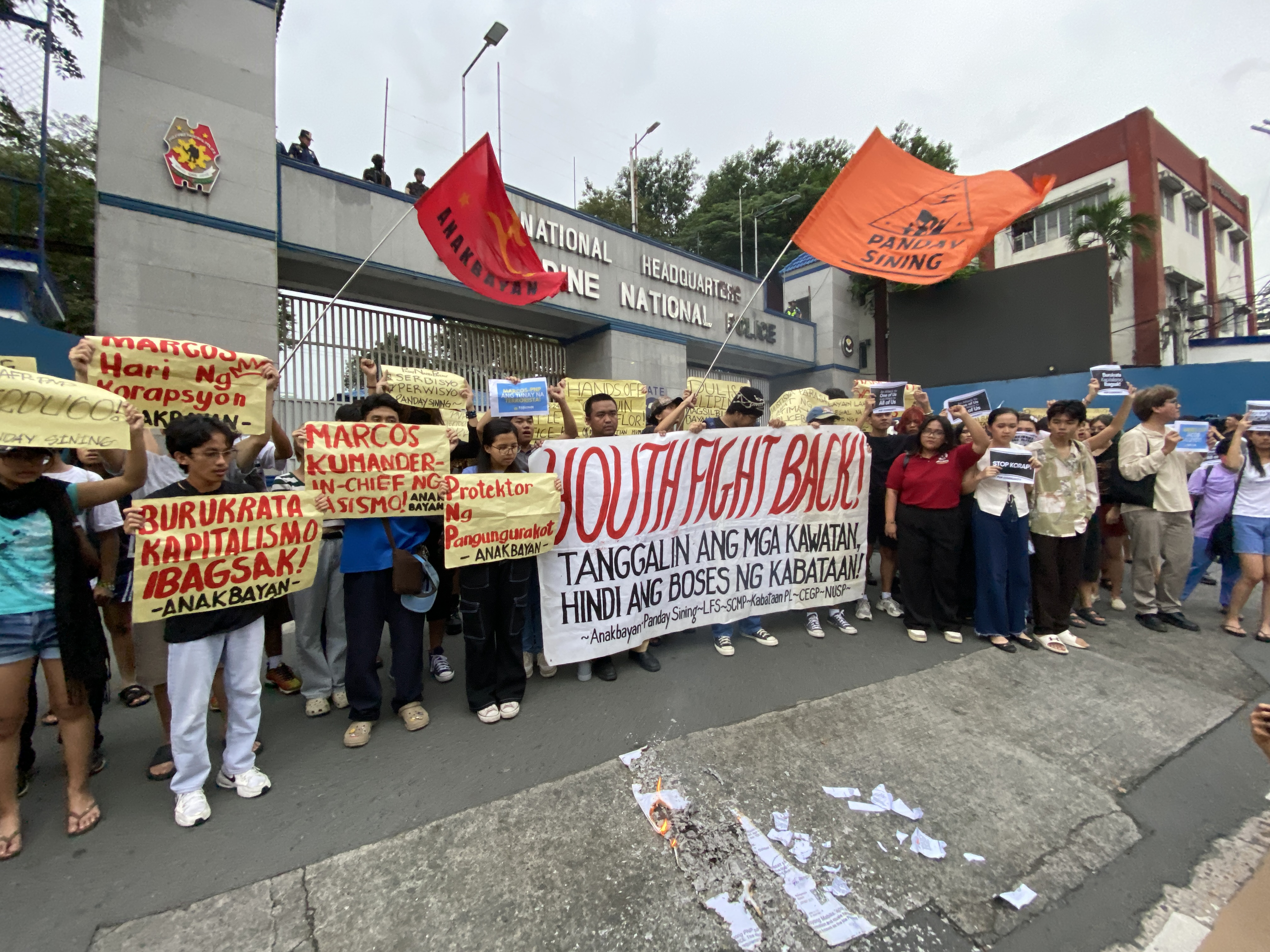
Protesters denounced political suppression and corruption in front of Camp Crame.

Youth leaders trooped to the gate of Camp Crame, against subpoenas of the PNP on student leaders for their involvement in the September 21 protest. The protesters continued to decry corruption and their claim of political intimidation and repression of those participating in the protests. The students said that those under investigation must be the corrupt officials. A speaker of the program said that government funds must be allocated to education and not corruption and political suppression. PUP Sentral na Konseho ng mga Mag-aaral (Central Student Council) President Tiffany Faith Brillante, one of those who received subpoenas and was called to show up to the police on that date opted to join and speak at the protest action. In an act of defiance, protesters tore up and burned copies of the subpoena.

=== October 30 ===
Health workers from the Alliance of Health Workers staged a protest in front of the Philippine Heart Center condemning corruption and its effects on the deplorable conditions of health workers in the country. The group also condemned unfinished 'super health centers', as well as expired medicines that are being investigated for corruption.

A candle-lighting protest condemning corrupt politicians and ghost projects was conducted by student journalists in Catarman, Northern Samar spearheaded by University of Eastern Philippines (UEP) student publication The Pillar with the College Editors Guild of the Philippines and Altermidya.

=== October 31 ===
One the eve of All Souls' Day, BAYAN mobilized at Mendiola in a Halloween-themed protest, calling Malacañang a 'house of horror'. BAYAN Secretary-General Raymond "Mong" Palatino said that those who truly kill Filipinos are the corrupt politicians. The protest featured demonic and monstrous descriptions of politicians like President Marcos Sr. and Vice President Sara Duterte.

Clergy people from the Iglesia Filipina Independiente and Promotion of Church People's Response launched an anti-corruption Black Friday Protest in Cagayan de Oro City.

=== November 7 ===
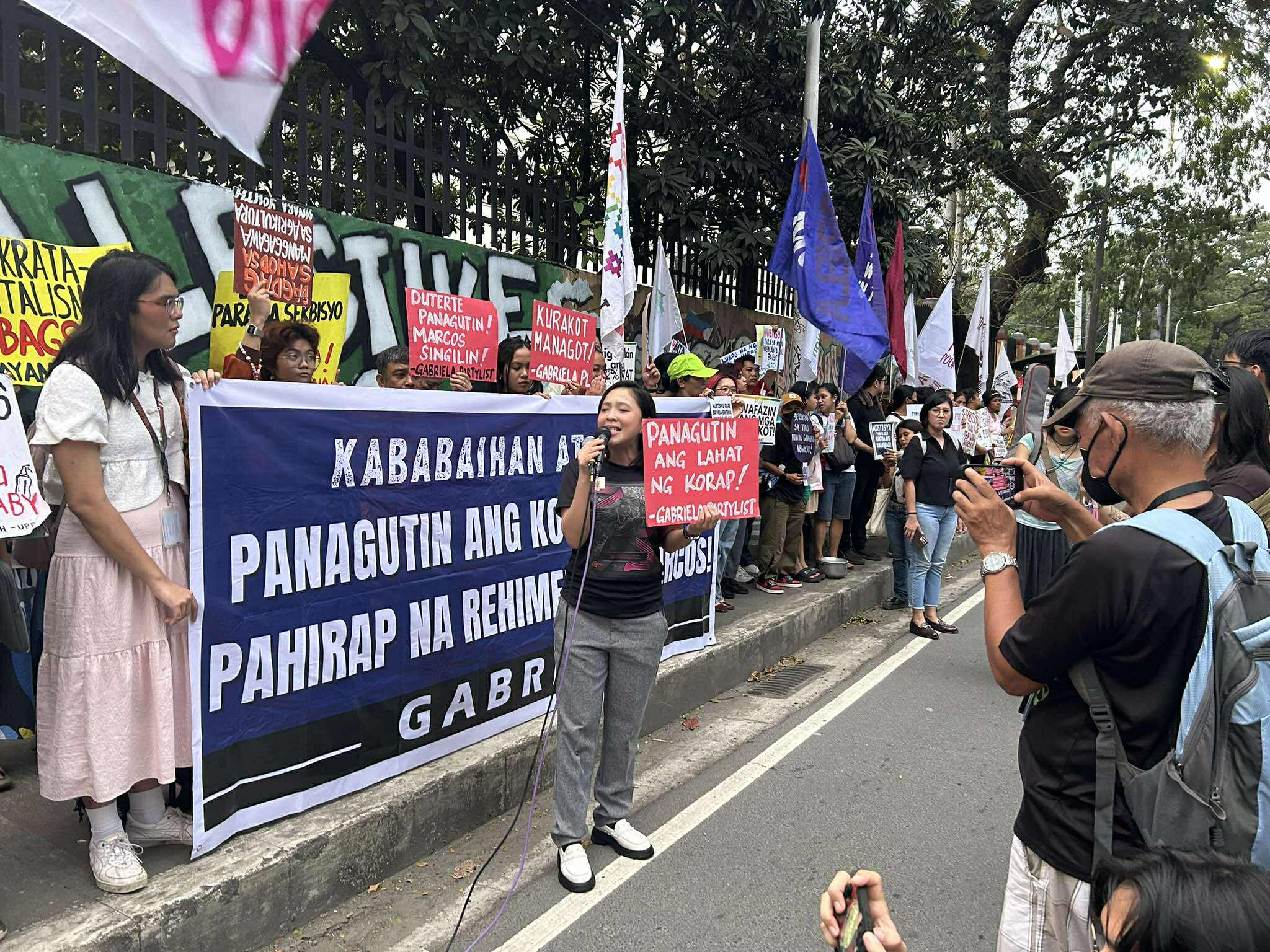
Gabriela Women's Party Congresswoman Sarah Elago speaking at a Black Friday Protest, November 7.

Various groups affiliated with BAYAN launched multiple protests for November 7 Black Friday Protests.

In the morning, groups such as KMP, as well as disaster survivors, clashed with the police at the Office of the Ombudsman in Quezon City. The groups urged the Ombudsman to urgently investigate President Marcos Jr. for his said role in "institutionalizing corruption". They urged the office to probe flood control projects and other infrastructure that exacerbated floods in Cebu during Typhoon Tino approved during the Duterte and Marcos Jr. administrations. In a separate statement, Gabriela Women's Party Congresswoman Sarah Elago called for an independent investigation of infrastructure projects in Cebu as well.

Groups such as BAYAN National Capital Region marched from Liwasang Bonifacio to Mendiola in protest against corruption called Lakbayan ng Mamamayan Kontra Korapsyon (Journey of the People Against Corruption). A significant of the protest was cultural, containing street theater and musical performances, also paying homage to the October Revolution and the Great Proletarian Cultural Revolution.

Urban poor groups and members from Bayan Muna and Kadamay protested along Gregorio Araneta Avenue, Quezon City where there has been a flood-control project priced at ₱48 million, but they said did not work for residents of Brgy. Tatalon and was only painted red.

Teachers from the Alliance of Concerned Teachers (ACT) held a Black Friday Protest among their places of work against corruption. According to ACT Chairperson Ruby Bernardo, teachers are not asking for luxury, but their rights as teachers for just pay. ACT hit President Marcos Jr. for his lavish lifestyle and travels amidst corruption, calling him as the principal architect of corruption. They announced a national sit-down strike on November 28.

Teachers, students, and employees launched a protest inside UP Diliman denouncing the fact that 44% of UP Diliman employees are contractual workers while there is massive corruption.

During dusk, BAYAN held a Black Friday Protest at Katipunan Avenue denouncing corruption. They also denounced the massive budget of National Task Force to End Local Communist Armed Conflict where red-tagging has been used to stifle dissent.

=== November 8 ===
Workers of unions under the leadership of trade union center KMU, Pambato Cargo Forwarder, Wyeth Philippines, and Daiwa Seiko, went out from their places of work to forward anti-corruption calls while also calling for higher wages and better working conditions.

=== November 13 ===
Students of Mapúa University Makati staged a walkout against corruption.

=== November 14 ===
BAYAN and affiliated groups launched multiple decentralized protests for November 14 Black Friday Protests.

KMP held a protest outside the Senate as the Blue Ribbon Committee probe on flood control corruption was ongoing.

Urban poor group Kadamay led a Hukuman ng Maralita (Court of the Poor), condemning the National Housing Authority, Department of Human Settlements and Urban Development, and President Marcos Jr. for corruption of officials and contractors amidst housing crisis in the country.

Bayan Muna launched protests in Tatalon, Quezon City and Blumentritt, Sampaloc, Manila.

Various unions under KMU held protests at their work places. These include Nexperia Philippines Inc. Workers Union, Wyeth Philippines Progressive Workers Union - WPPWU, Vanson Paper Industrial Workers Union, and Gabay ng Unyon sa Telekomuniksyon ng mga Superbisor (GUTS-PLDT). Workers from First Cavite Industrial Estate, Cavite (headed by Progressive Workers Union Local 47-IBM KMU); Centro Mall Cabuyao, Laguna; and Canlubang Industrial Estate, Laguna also held similar anti-corruption and pro-worker protests.

UST chapters of Anakbayan, Panday Sining, and Kabataan Partylist marched from España to Central Market and conducted an anti-corruption at the market to highlight the plight of the vendors amidst large-scale corruption.

At Mendiola, youth groups and labor groups such as KMU staged a protest against corruption. The protesters called for accountability for all those involved in corruption, including President Marcos Jr. The Manila Police placed barbed wires as barricades at the entrance of the road, in front of the Mendiola Peace Arch.

Students and teachers from UP Diliman College of Engineering and College of Science dissolved faces of President Marcos Jr. and Vice President Sara Duterte printed on paper as part of protests against corruption. They denounced how money should have been put into facilities like laboratories. STEM students from PUP, UP Manila, and Philippine Normal University led by Agham Youth also launched a protest at their respective universities against government corruption, also condemning the effect of corruption during typhoons Tino and Uwan. They expressed how misuse of government funds have led to the stunting of STEM development in the country. Members of UP ACTION also launched a protest at Brgy. Krus Na Ligas. Hours later, students of UP Diliman converged with other students, teachers, and staff in a protest in Philcoa.

Makabayan leaders Liza Maza and Rep. Antonio Tinio of ACT Teachers joined church people and other citizens in San Pablo, Laguna for a rally by San Pablo Ayaw sa Korapsyon (SAPAK).

In Cebu City, victims of typhoon Tino and BAYAN Central Visayas staged a Black Friday Protest at dusk at Gorordo Avenue, denouncing government corruption. They lit candles and rang bells.

Outside of their convent at Aurora Boulevard, nuns from the Religious of the Good Shepherd held their weekly rosary prayer against corruption.

=== November 15 ===
Miss Earth-Water 2024 Bea Millan-Windorski joined a climate justice mobilization headed by Youth Advocates for Climate Action Philippines, Kalikasan, and Agham near US Embassy Manila against imperialism and how corruption worsens natural disasters.

BAYAN held a protest at Boy Scout Memorial Circle in Quezon City carrying calls for President Marcos Jr. and Vice President Duterte to resign following the video statements of resigned Rep. Zaldy Co. According to BAYAN Secretary General Mong Palatino, they are opposed to the message of the Iglesia Ni Cristo rally for they have been silent regarding the said corruption of the Dutertes.

=== November 16 ===
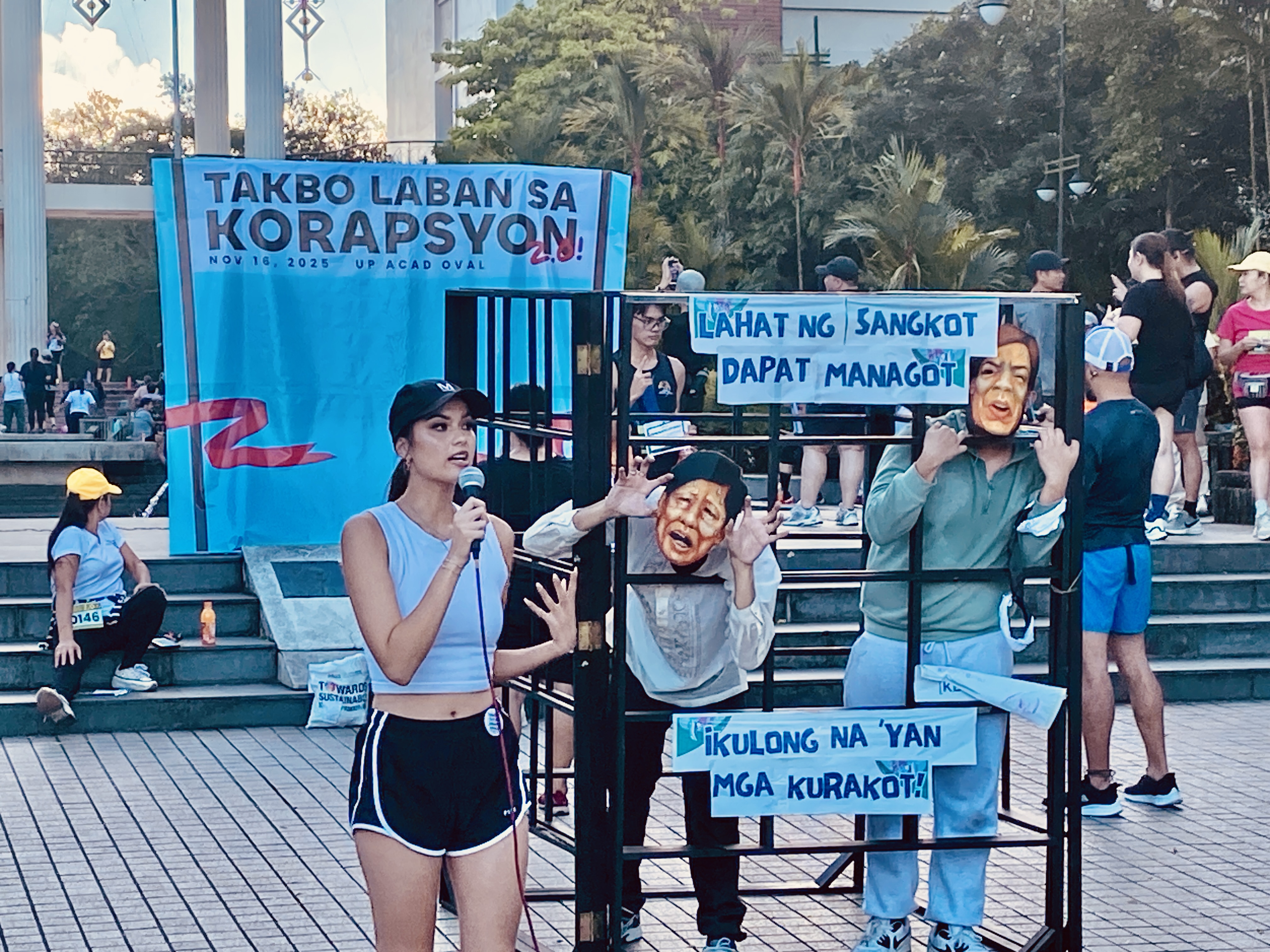
Millan-Windorski speaking at the anti-corruption fun run.

The second installment of Takbo Laban sa Korapsyon (Run Against Corruption) fun run was held at UP Diliman headed by the UP Diliman Engineering Student Council and STEM-based organizations under BAYAN. Over 3,000 runners joined the event. The fun run featured a jail booth where participants tried to put alleged various government officials in a makeshift jail. They even expressed disappointment over the justice system where no one has been held accountable for the past three months. Miss Earth-Water 2024 Bea Millan-Windorski also spoked during the event, saying that corruption is a worldwide issue, including in the United States and in the then-ongoing Conference of Parties for the dominance of business and fossil-fuel lobbyists.

Progressive youth led by Rise for Education - SLSU and Bantay-Kaban Quezon held a 'hang-out protest' against corruption near the San Luis Obispo Church, Lucban, Quezon

The Iglesia ni Cristo-led "Rally for Transparency and a Better Democracy" protest also begins. Around 550,000 people were estimated to have gathered around the Quirino Grandstand in Manila by afternoon.

The United People's Initiative (UPI) held a parallel protest at the People Power Monument with the group urging President Marcos and Vice President Duterte to resolve their difference and focus on dealing with the anti-corruption issue. Meanwhile, other groups Partido Demokratiko Pilipino (PDP) and the Bangon Sambayanan has blamed Marcos for the issue.

=== November 17 ===
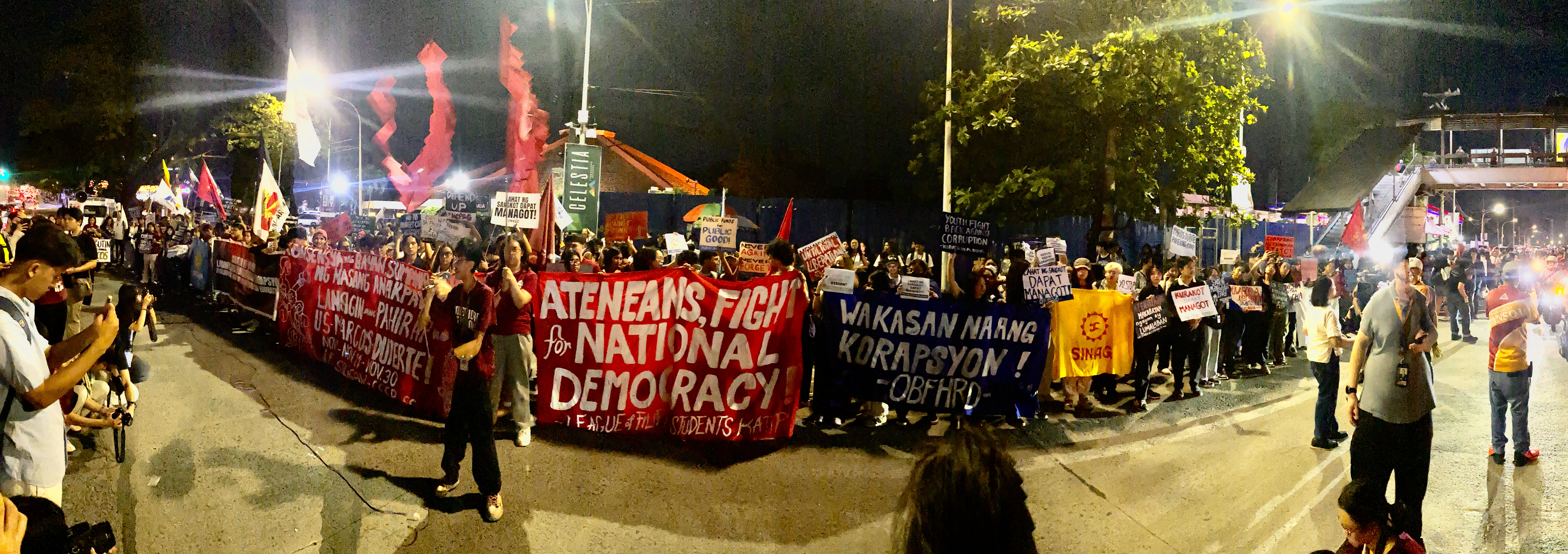
Merged protest of students from Ateneo de Manila University, Miriam College, and UP Diliman. UPD USC Chairperson Buenaflor is speaking.

BAYAN-affiliated youth mass organizations, student councils, and other groups led various youth-led anti-corruption protests in celebration of International Students' Day, nationally also observed as National Students' Day.

Youth Rage Against Corruption, Kabataan Partylist, and other groups marched to Mendiola in protest against corruption. Students carried placards towards the resignation of President Marcos Jr. and Vice President Duterte. However, they were only able to reach the front of the University of the East, Recto Avenue due to police barricades.

Students also marched and protested in anti-corruption rallies in UP Los Baños, UP Visayas, Miagao; Cebu City; Tacloban City; and Davao City where it was spearheaded by the regional chapter of Kabataan Partylist. In Iloilo City, students from UP Visayas Iloilo City Campus, West Visayas State University, and Central Philippine University, as well as teachers and members from other sectors merged by the Iloilo Provincial Capitol.

For the first time in the university's history, a walkout was staged by the students of the UEP, Catarman. The protest was against corruption and against militarization while there were also reported presence of police and intelligence agents.

In the afternoon, students from Ateneo de Manila University, Miriam College, and UP Diliman merged at Katipunan Avenue for a joint One Katipunan Laban sa Korapsyon protest. Heads and representatives of the student councils of the three educational institutions have called for the resignation of both the President and Vice President and all those involved in corruption.

In the evening, the Iglesia ni Cristo-led "Rally for Transparency and a Better Democracy" protest ended, cutting it short by one day.

The Duterte-aligned groups, Reforma Filipina and Hakbang ng Maisug, said they respected the decision of INC organizers and instead moved their assembly to Liwasang Bonifacio, where they continued to rally over separate issues including flooding in Quezon City's fifth district.

=== November 18 ===
Headed by the National Union of Students of the Philippines Cordillera in observance of International / National Students' Day, more than 5,000 students from Baguio City and Benguet walked out of Benguet State University (BSU), Saint Louis University, University of Baguio, University of the Cordilleras, UP Baguio, and other schools and converged at Malcolm Square. Students of BSU joined the walkout despite what students voiced as efforts by the school administration to silence the mobilization. Students raised anti-corruption calls where government money could have been used for education purposes. Students have said that this will not be their last walkout and they would participate in the Bonifacio Day rallies on November 30.

Pro-Marcos counter-protesters, led by Filipinos Do Not Yield movement, gathered at the Welcome Rotonda in Quezon City, expressed their support for President Bongbong Marcos, and calling for the accountability on corrupt politicians.

=== November 21 ===
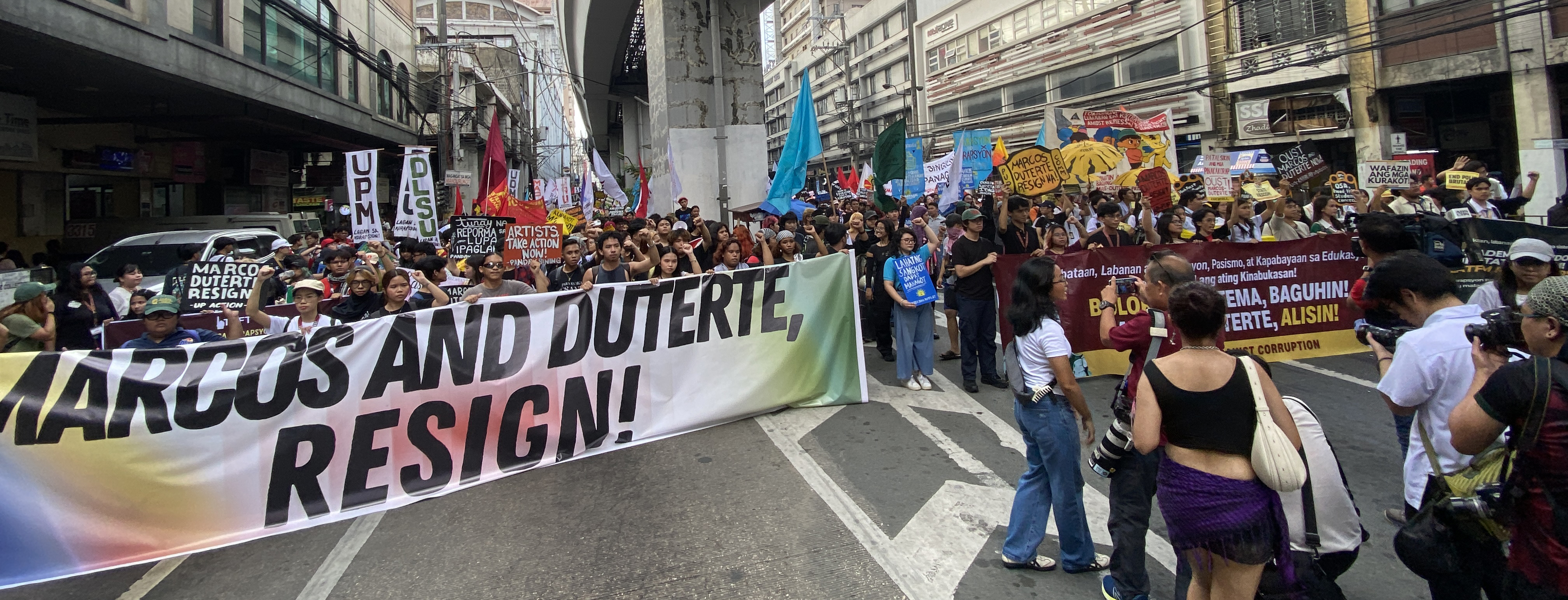
Nationwide youth walkout converged at Mendiola, November 21.

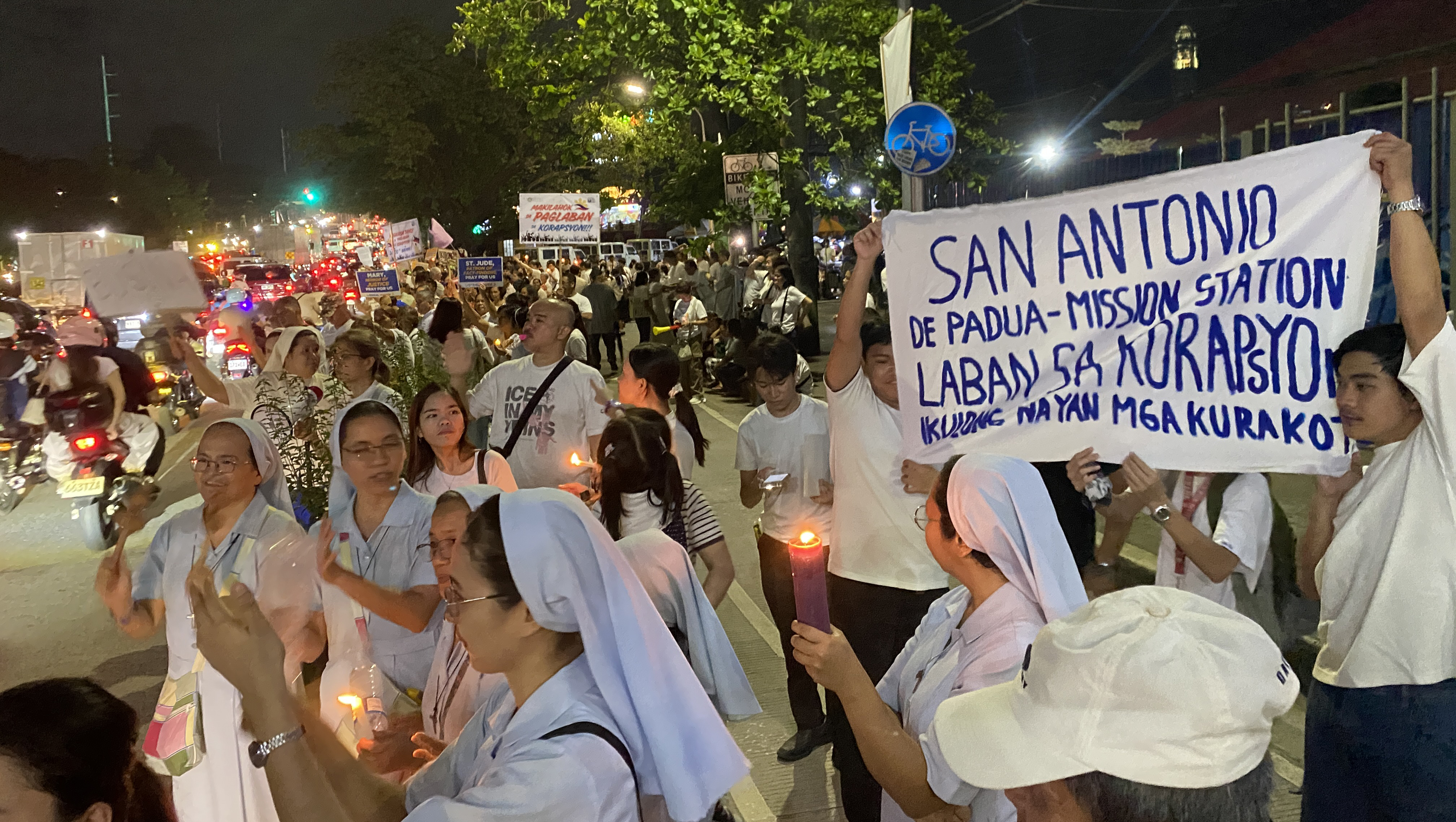
Church-led protest at Katipunan Ave., November 21

A National Day of Walkout was orchestrated by Youth Rage Against Corruption, Kabataan Partylist, Anakbayan, and many more. The protesters converged by afternoon at Mendiola. Before this, walkouts were conducted by students in many schools and universities around Metro Manila. Speakers and banners called for the resignation and removal of both President Marcos Jr. and Vice President Sara Duterte.

Other BAYAN affiliated organizations also held Black Friday Protests that day.

A church-led protest was held along Katipunan Avenue that night.

=== November 22 ===
A Padyak Kontra Kurakot (Pedal Against Corrupt) was held by groups such as Kalikasan, Kilusang Bayan Kontra Kurakot (KBKK), Make It Safer Movement, and Youth Advocates for Climate Action Philippines. Cyclists donning protest placards and other forms of visual protest cycled from Quezon City Hall to Liwasang Bonifacio, Manila.

=== November 25 ===
On the International Day for the Elimination of Violence Against Women, women's groups headed by Gabriela National Alliance of Women led a protest at Mendiola condemning violence against women, which includes corruption that has kept many Filipino women in poverty.

=== November 27 ===
Members of the underground youth organization Kabataang Makabayan (KM), as well as other affiliated organizations of the National Democratic Front of the Philippines (NDFP) like Artista at Manunulat ng Sambayanan (ARMAS, or People’s Artists and Writers), Katipunan ng mga Gurong Makabayan (KAGUMA, or Alliance of Patriotic Educators), and Liga ng Agham para sa Bayan (LAB, or League of People’s Scientists) held a 'lightning rally' against corruption and fascism at UP Diliman by advocating for armed revolution through people's war.

=== November 28 ===
BAYAN and affiliated organizations hosted several Black Friday Protests. Various groups headed by Sandugo protested in front of Quinta Market, Quiapo, Manila, condemning the alleged corruption under President Marcos Jr. and Vice President Duterte. Earlier that day, peasant groups like KMP and AMIHAN protested in front of the Department of Agriculture against said corruption in the agency, including corruption stemming from importation of agricultural products, in collusion with the Bureau of Customs.

Film Workers Against Corruption (FWAC) composed of directors, editors, writers, production designers, and related workers launched a press conference condemning corruption in the government while funds for media and the arts remain scant. They chanted, "Pack up na, mga korap!" (pack up, corrupt ones!).

=== November 29 ===
Students from BS Pharmacy and BS Pharmaceutical Sciences of UP Manila staged a 'lightning rally' against corruption during the 15th White Coat Ceremony. They denounced the related neglect to the health sector.

=== November 30 ===
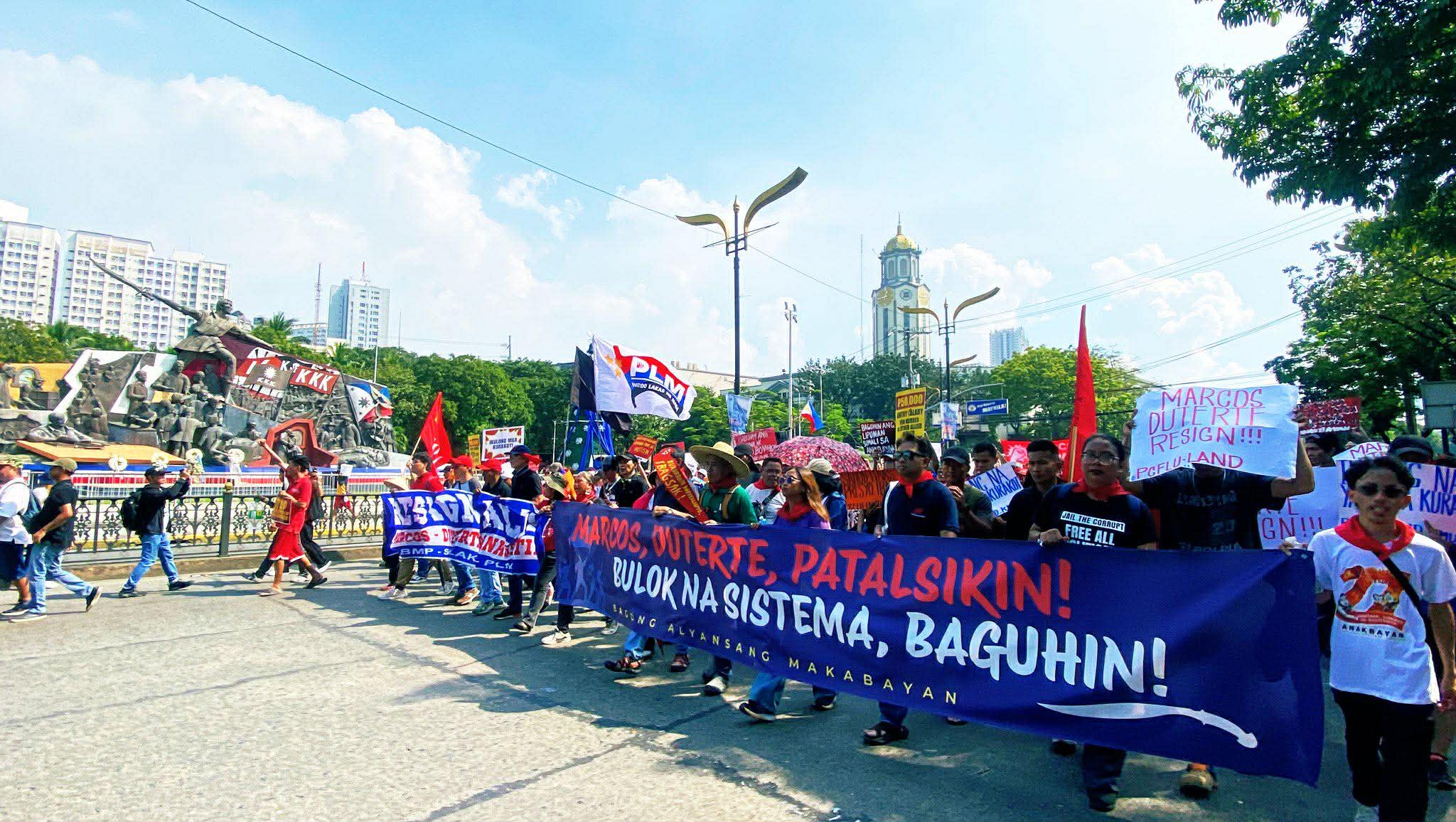
Baha Sa Luneta 2.0 rallyists marching in front of Bonifacio Shrine towards Mendiola. They are calling for the resignation and ouster of both the President and Vice President.

A big protest by the Trillion Peso March Movement was made in EDSA. Baha Sa Luneta 2.0 was done at Luneta Park in which its participants marched up to Mendiola Avenue. Duterte supporters also marched at Liwasang Bonifacio up to Mendiola, calling for the resignation of President Bongbong Marcos. Sulu for PBBM, a pro-Marcos counterprotester group also made demonstrations at Mendiola.

Several protest actions were held in many regions and cities around the Philippines and by OFWs around the world, including a demonstration in Utrecht in the Netherlands, led by overseas chapters of BAYAN.

At 9 a.m., an L-300 van and 5 jeepneys used to transport protesters were seized by the Land Transportation Office near the Balintawak Ayala Mall. Center for Trade Union and Human Rights condemned the seizure, calling it a violation of jeepney drivers' democratic rights to free expression and peaceful assembly. Bayan also condemned the seizure of 20 vehicles in different locations and said that the government was starving families by depriving drivers of livelihood.

In Baguio City, a local version of Baha sa Luneta was held, called Baha sa Burnham [Park].

In Davao City, demonstrators on Roxas Avenue protested "massive corruption" under Bongbong Marcos and Sara Duterte, calling the two the "king and queen of corruption".

==== Demonstration on November 30 ====
Cardinal Pablo Virgilio David's statements was met with pushback from Mae Paner, one of the organizers of the parallel Baha sa Luneta protests. She expressed concern that his statement might have negative implication's on the opposition's chances to field its candidate in the upcoming 2028 presidential election remarking how the Luneta and EDSA group should be uniting against their anti-corruption calls.

Sonny Melencio, chairperson of Partido Lakas ng Masa, stated David's statement was saddening and alarming and criticize the characterization of his group's proposal of a People's Transition Council as endorsement of a military coup or a civilian-military junta noting how similar setups were made following the aftermath of the July 2024 Revolution in Bangladesh and the 2025 Nepalese Gen Z protests.

EveryWoman convenors Guy Claudio and Jean Franco defended David maintaining that the cardinal's words are mere statement of fact and that it reflects the EDSA group's disagreement with the "resign all" call of the Luneta group and that labeling those who disagree with the calls for both President Marcos and Vice President Duterte to resign are "opportunists or lackeys of the President… is puritanical, exclusivist, arrogant and ultimately, self-defeating"

==== December ====
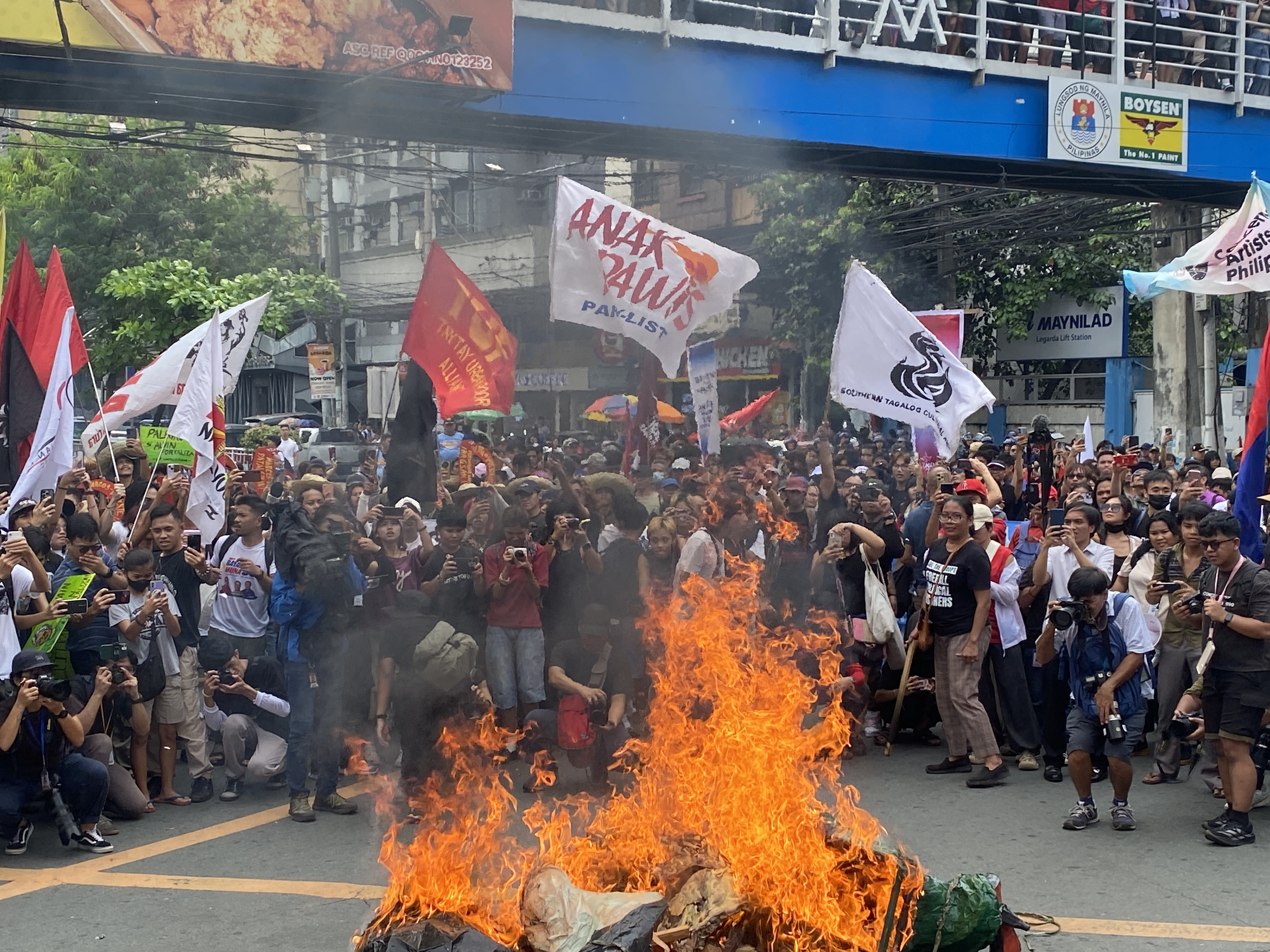
Protesters burned the effigies of Marcos and Duterte at Mendiola.

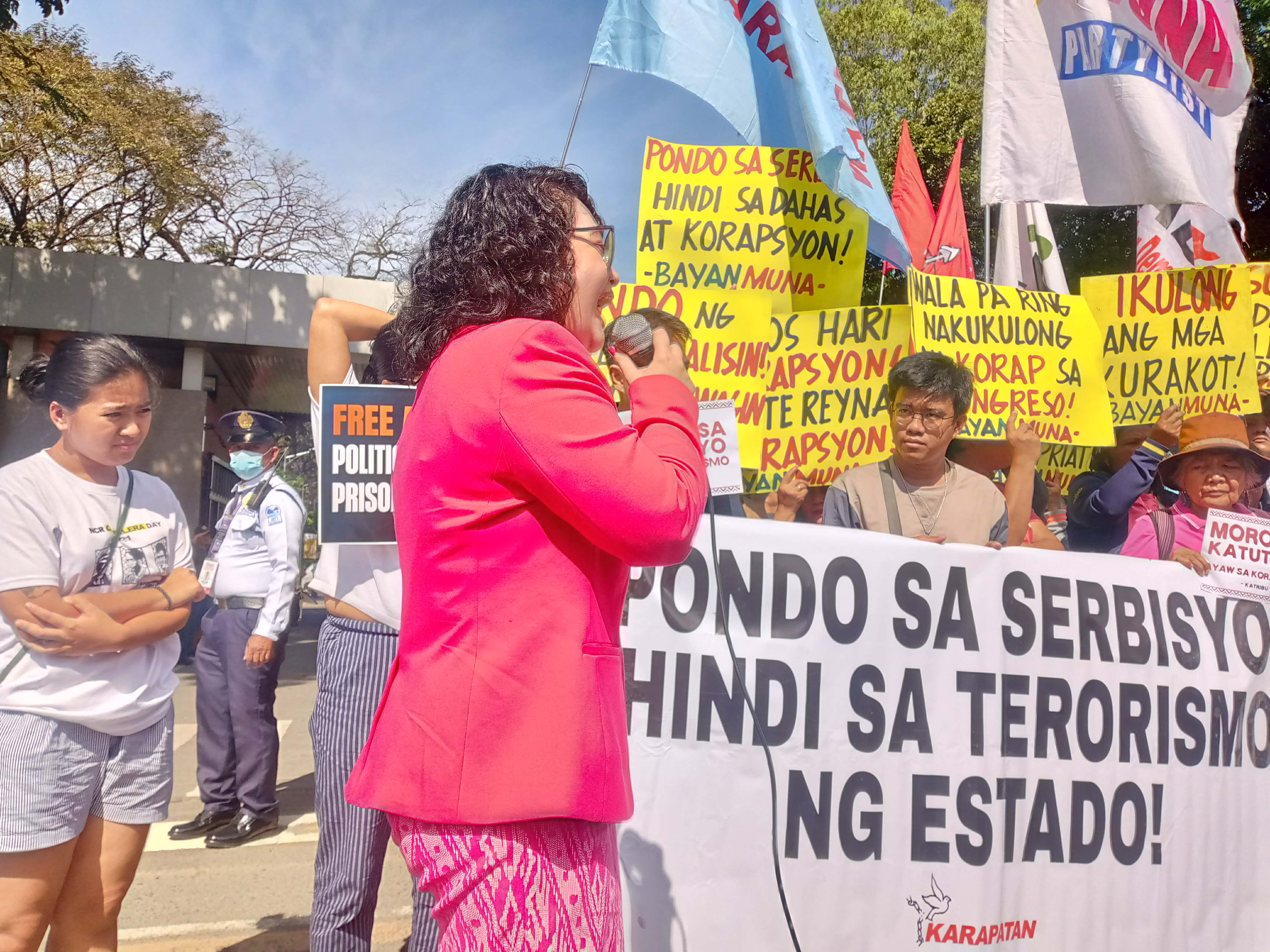
Congresswoman Renee Co of Kabataan Party-list speaking outside Congress, December 29, 2025.

After a 6-year hiatus after COVID-19, UP Baguio once held a Lantern Parade in the campus where students held calls against corruption. UPB Chancellor Joel Addawe commended the students' leadership. Days later, BAYAN and affiliated organizations hosted several Black Friday Protests.

Meanwhile, members of the underground youth organization Kabataang Makabayan held a 'lightning rally' against corruption by advocating the ouster of both President Marcos Jr. and Vice President Duterte, as well as armed revolution.

On International Human Rights Day, Karapatan and Bayan held a protest condemning the intertwining of corruption and state violence in the Philippines that has had profound effects on the situation of human rights in the country. The protest also highlighted how many anti-corruption activists have been arrested, where more than 200 have been arrested since September 21, including 91 children. According to Karapatan Secretary-General Cristina Palabay, corruption is a human rights issue. She questioned how alleged top corrupt officials, namely Marcoes and Duterte, have not yet been put into jail. The protesters marched from Liwasang Bonifacio to Mendiola where they burned effigies of President Marcos Jr. and Vice President Sara Duterte.

A Walkout 2.0 was conducted by students from the Central Luzon State University, headed by local chapters of Anakbayan. Banners call for the ouster of both Marcos and Duterte, as well as the establishment of a National Transition Council. They also decried budget cuts against state universities and colleges. UP Cebu lantern parade that marched in Lahug, Cebu City featured lanterns and other props condemning corruption and alleged corrupt figures such as President Marcos Jr. and former Rep. Zaldy Co. Segments of the annual UP Diliman Lantern Parade served as protests against corruption and other related issues, with chants and mini-rallies by various organizations and student councils. Several float-lanterns, including those from College of Engineering, College of Law, and University Student Council featured crocodiles, a symbol of corrupt bureaucrats in Philippine popular culture. The lantern of the College of Law included the legal maxim "Justice delayed is justice denied." Some lanterns depicted politicians involved, including President Marcos Jr., as monsters. Spotted as well was a lightning or a surprise rally protest and lanterns by what it appears to be clandestine supporters of the CPP and organizations affiliated to the NDFP. These revolutionary groups called for armed revolution to radically solve corruption under a reactionary state. They set fire to images bearing those of Marcos Jr. and Sara Duterte.

Earlier that day, about 100 members of the Alpha Phi Omega fraternity conducted an Oblation Run, ran naked against the issue of corruption in the government. The theme was "Takbo Laban sa Trilyong Tinakbo" or Run Against the Trillions Taken Away. Members of the UST community chanted "Ikulong na 'yang mga kurakot!" (Jail those corrupt ones!), derived from the UP collegial chant, during the annual Paskuhan event after Ben&Ben sang "Kapangyarihan", a known OPM song that tackles corruption and police brutality.

A benefit gig-protest was conducted by East NCR and Rizal local chapters of Kabataan Partylist and Panday Sining in Marikina City. The proceeds of the gig will go directly to victims of floods in the area.

A rally by PUP students, headed by SAMASA PUP and Anakbayan ang other national-democratic mass organizations was held by the gate of the university. They decried the General Apporiations Bill (GAB) or the proposed budget for fiscal year 2026. They stressed the unfinished and horrible conditions of facilities in the university. The students burned a large ₱500-bill bearing the faces of alleged corrupt politicians like President Marcos Jr. and Vice President Duterte. The ₱500-bill was in response to the statement of Department of Trade and Industry Secretary Cristina Roque that ₱500 is enough for a Noche Buena feast.

Revolutionary groups, including Kabataang Makabayan, launched a 'lightning rally' along Rizal Avenue denouncing corruption and fascism on December 21. According to these groups, the national democratic revolution will end the corruption of the rotten system. A placard claimed how the AFP and PNP are the protectors of the corrupt, while the New People's Army protects the oppressed masses. On December 29, BAYAN and Makabayan-affiliated groups staged an anti-corruption protest outside of the House of Representatives on the last day of Congress session.

On Rizal Day, KBKK and allied personalities led a wreath laying ceremony at the Rizal Monument, Rizal Park in honor of the hero. The group posed with calls calling corruption a social cancer, an idea used by José Rizal in his novel Noli Me Tángere, to describe the social ills during his time.

== 2026 protests ==
=== January ===
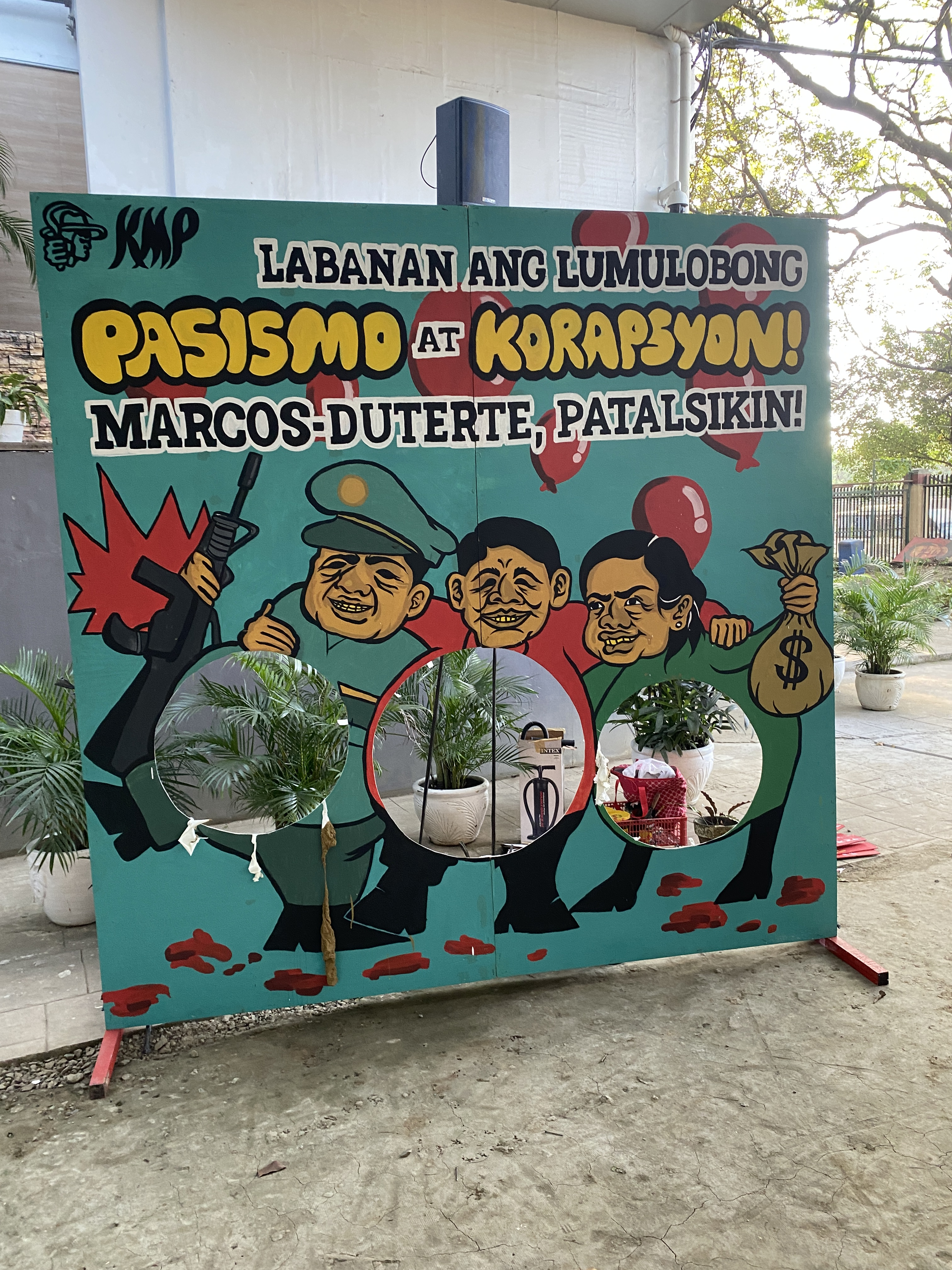
KMP anti-corruption forum and mobilization, January 22.

On January 5, 2026, Lasallians Against Corruption conducted an anti-corruption protest inside DLSU-Manila. Another protests occurred on January 15, organized by youth activists, including students of PUP, in front of the Department of Justice (DOJ) against corruption and the sedition case filed by the DOJ against PUP campus journalist Jacob Baluyot, among other accused, in relation to the September 21 protest at Mendiola. During the afternoon, PUP students also held a local mobilization inside the school. On the following day, students of Ateneo de Manila University held a "Salubong 2026" rally to signal the first day of classes where they condemned corruption and called for the accountability and resignation of both President Marcos Jr. and Vice President Sara Duterte.

BAYAN and Makabayan affiliated organizations filed an impeachment complaint against President Marcos Jr due to allegations regarding corruption. One major content of the complaint was regarding the creation of the “BBM parametric formula,” a method that allocated the budget of public works towards legislative districts, a factor on the grounds on the 'betrayal of public trust'. The effort was signed by representatives of different organizations. The complaint was filed by the three Makabayan Representatives Tinio, Elago, and Co. The attempt was not fulfilled due to absence of House Secretary General Cheloy Garafil. The impeachment complaint was refiled on January 26. A mass mobilization was made in concurrence outside the House of Representatives on January 22. During the afternoon, KMU held a forum and protest along Commission on Human Rights office condemning said corruption under President Marcos Jr. and Vice President Duterte.

Aldrin Kitsune, Secretary-General of Kalayaan Kontra Korapsyon dared the Marcos Jr. administration to jail and prosecute corrupt officials instead. This is in response to the sedition case filed by the DOJ against Kitsune and other participants of the September 21 mobilization at Mendiola. The group held a mobilization protest, together with students of De La Salle–College of Saint Benilde outside DOJ on January 26.

=== February ===
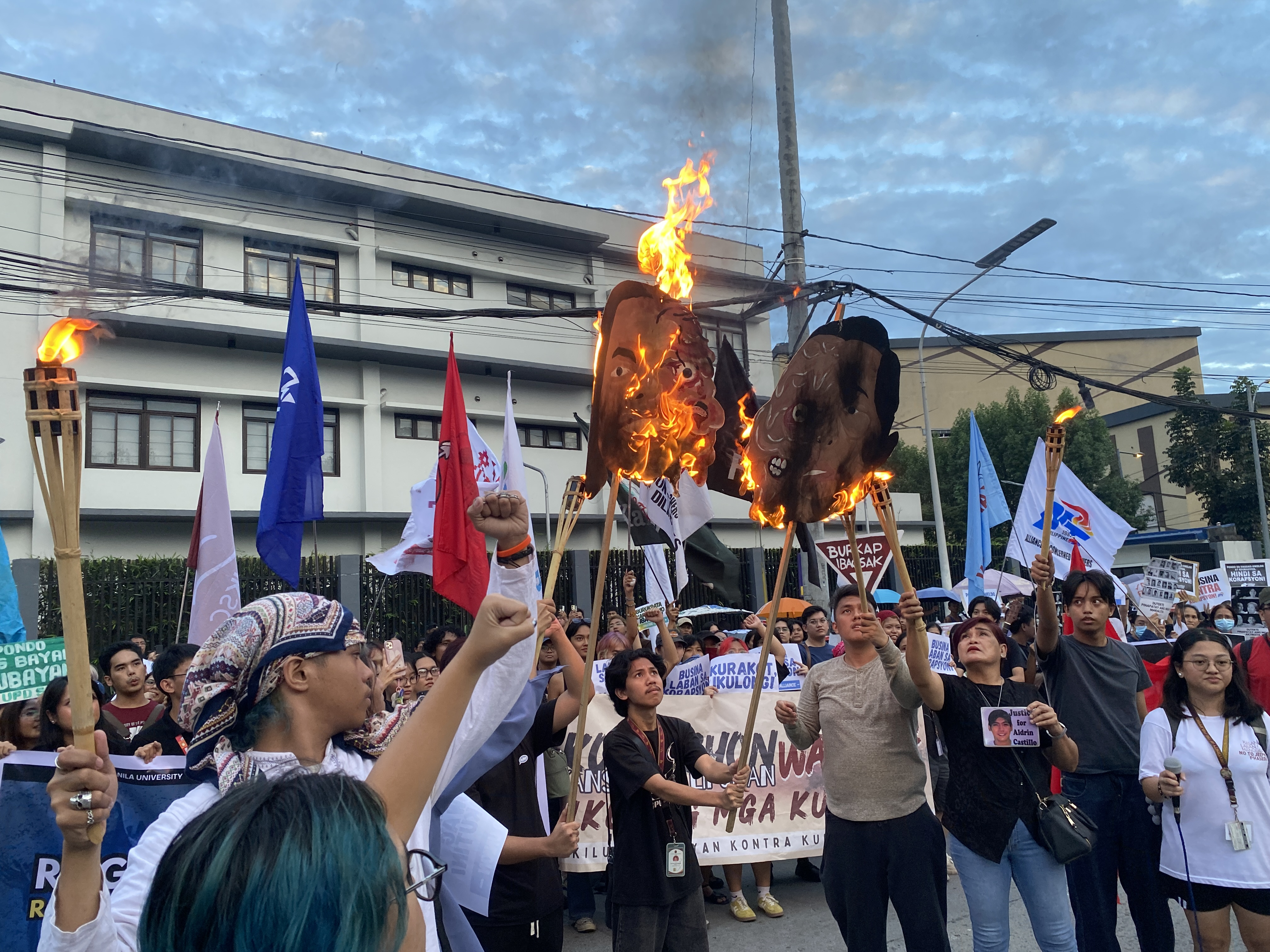
One Katipunan protest.

A ‘One Katipunan’ protest, involving student leaders and councils from schools along Katipunan Avenue, UP Diliman, Ateneo de Manila University, and Miriam College was conducted on February 20. Calling for the ouster of both Marcos and Duterte, it served as an anti-corruption protest prelude towards the 40th anniversary of the EDSA People Power headed by students, faculty, and other concerned citizens.

==== February 25 ====
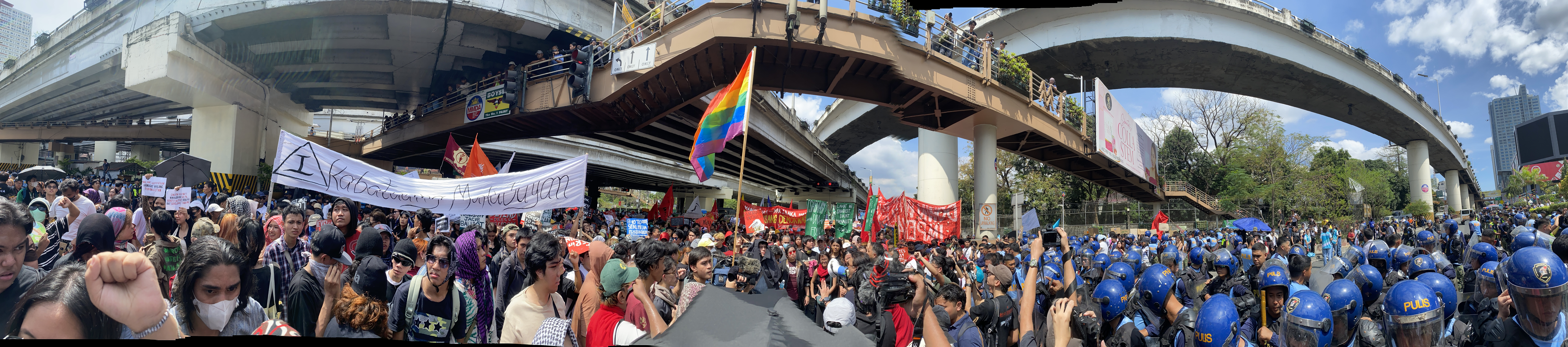
Baha Sa EDSA, February 25, 2026.

The 40th anniversary of the EDSA People Power Revolution was marked by two major anti-corruption protests along the historic thoroughfare: church groups and civil society organizations affiliated with the liberal opposition mounted the third iteration of the Trillion Peso March along White Plains Avenue near the People Power Monument, while various progressive groups and mass organizations led a separate mobilization dubbed Baha Sa EDSA (Flood in EDSA), held in the intersection of EDSA and Ortigas Avenue, near the EDSA Shrine.

Despite initial talks for a joint and unified program, negotiations between organizers of the two protests reportedly fell through over disagreements on demands — especially regarding calls for the resignation and impeachment of both President Marcos and Vice President Duterte, as well as the establishment a People's Transition Council. Only the Trillion Peso March was granted a permit by the Quezon City government, and tensions arose as law enforcers confiscated the truck stage to be used in the Baha Sa EDSA mobilization and attempted to block protesters from marching to the EDSA Shrine. Two activists were arbitrarily and forcefully arrested for allegedly “assaulting police officers,” which was condemned by progressive and rights groups such as BAYAN, Amnesty International, PAHRA, and SPARK.

==== Demonstration on February 25 ====
Two activists were arrested during the February 25 protests for allegedly “assaulting police officers”. Progressive and rights groups such as Bayan, Amnesty International, PAHRA, and Samahan ng Progresibong Kabataan (SPARK) condemned the arrests and called for the immediate release of the two detainees. Despite this, the PNP dismissed calls for their release, insisting that the arrests were lawful; And stated that “Rights end when violence starts”.

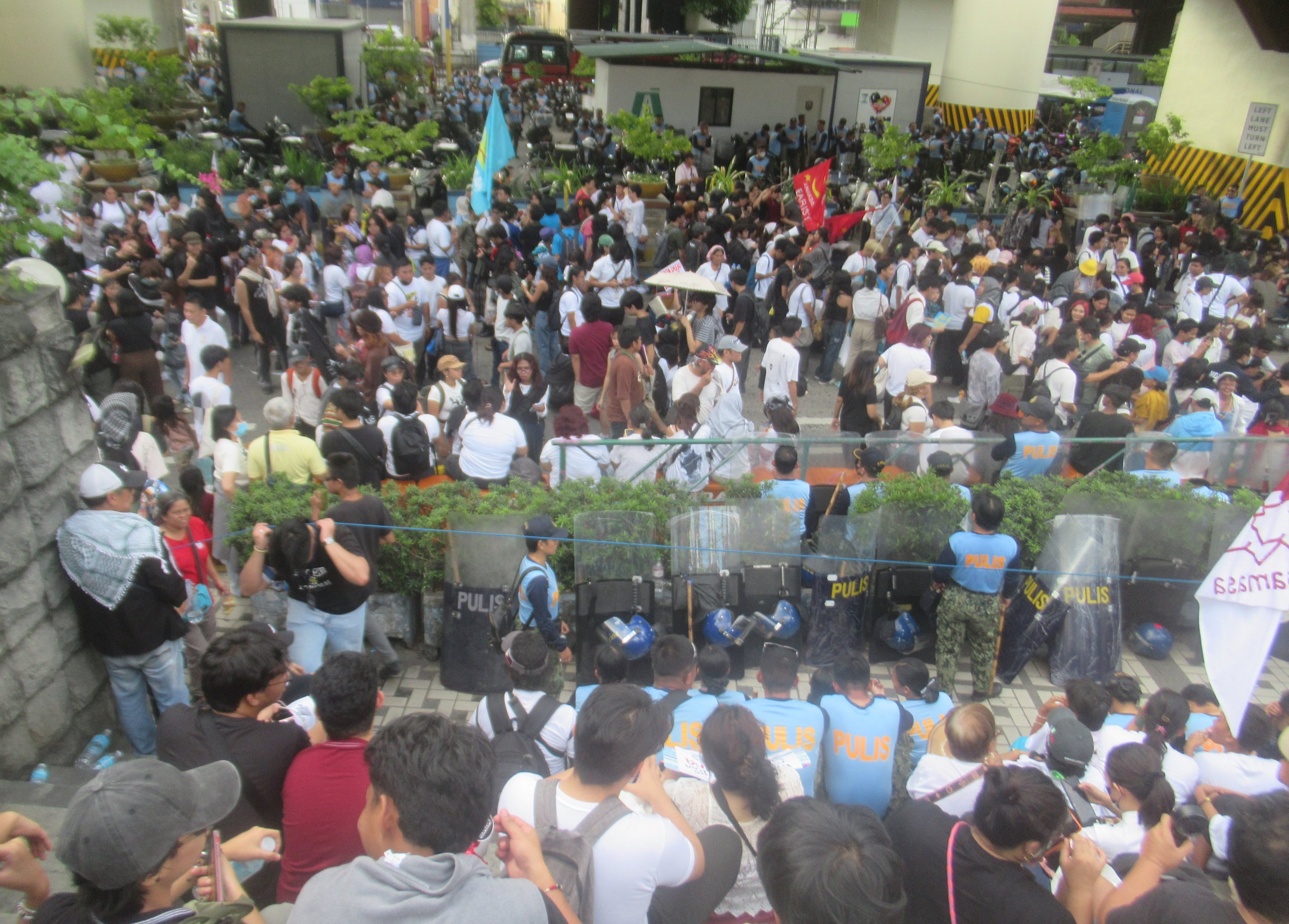
Baha sa EDSA protest outside the EDSA Shrine on February 25, 2026

A third protest was held on February 25, 2026, coinciding with the 40th anniversary of the People Power Revolution. Various church and civil society groups conducted day-long activities across three sites in Quezon City. Participants marched from the EDSA Shrine to the People Power Monument as part of the demonstration organized by the Trillion Peso March Movement and Caritas Philippines.

=== June ===
==== "White Ribbon" rally ====
On June 28, an anti-corruption protest organized by religious organizations and civil society groups, dubbed as the "White Ribbon March", was held along EDSA in Quezon City, calling on the government to address issues, mainly the ongoing flood control controversy and the upcoming impeachment of vice president Sara Duterte.

The rally started with a mass at the EDSA Shrine, presided over by Kidapawan Bishop Jose Colin Bagaforo. Thereafter, the participants, carrying white ribbons, marched towards the People Power Monument where the program, started at 2:30 p.m., involved speeches from speakers.

The event, being an interfaith activity, was joined by religious sectors including Catholics, Muslims, Protestants, Born Again Christians, and the Aglipayan Church. The Iglesia ni Cristo (INC) was said invited to take part in the march. The protest was likewise attended by militant groups. Among those joined the event were Makabayan president Liza Maza, former legislators Teddy Casiño and France Castro, and Kontra Daya convenor Danilo Arao. Meanwhile, at the march along EDSA, SAGIP Partylist representative Paolo Marcoleta and former Anakalusugan representative Mike Defensor, along with Duterte supporters dressed in white, were seen. Marcoleta was reported going to the event only to drop off food; while Defensor had announced through Facebook on his presence.

The Quezon City Police District estimated the crowd at the People Power Monument at around 3,600, particularly at 3:30 p.m.

==== June–July INC "We Are One" protests ====
In mid-2026, a three-day rally was organized by the INC in support of its member, senator Rodante Marcoleta (Paolo's father), amidst announcement from the Ombudsman on an impending plunder and indirect bribery complaints against him before the Sandiganbayan over allegedly undeclared campaign contributions in the 2025 elections.

The protest began at around 3 a.m. of June 30 with a surprise gathering near the People Power Monument in Quezon City, held without a permit from the local government, prompting a road closure as portions of EDSA and White Plains were occupied. Buses carrying church members later blocked the northbound path of EDSA including the Carousel bus lane; and an attempt by the police to remove them led to a brief confrontation, injuring three police officers. Four individuals were arrested but later released after a brief detention. Until the following day, massive crowd around parts of EDSA continued to cause major traffic jams.

The crowd at the EDSA rallies, particularly near the People Power Monument, reached 15,000 by 9 p.m. Meanwhile, simultaneous rallies at the EDSA Shrine and the Liwasang Bonifacio in Manila ended early. Marcoleta appeared on the second day of the EDSA rally; while several political allies likewise joined including Defensor who is also Marcoleta's alleged co-accused, senators Alan Peter Cayetano and Imee Marcos, Batangas representative Leandro Leviste, and former Ilocos Sur governor Chavit Singson.

The June 30 protest was allowed to continue until the Quezon City government granted a permit for the second day along White Plains Avenue. Further continuation of the rally for July 2 was later granted but was revoked shortly after. The main protest was then moved to Liwasang Bonifacio, which was attended by senator Robin Padilla and former Presidential Spokesperson Salvador Panelo. The crowd reportedly peaked at around 8,200 people by 8 p.m. In a video message aired on Net 25 after the program, INC spokesperson Edwil Zabala said that the rally had delivered its message, before formally announcing the end of their rally.

On July 3, the Ombudsman filed before the Sandiganbayan cases against Marcoleta, Defensor, and two businessmen, charging them with plunder and violating a decree that prohibits the providing of gifts to officials. On July 6, the four were separately arrested upon orders from the Sandiganbayan.
