= Philippine House Committee on Justice =

Standing committee of the House of Representatives of the Philippines

Committee on Justice
- 20th Congress

History
- New session started: To convene on July 28, 2025

Leadership
- Chairperson: Hon. Gerville Luistro

Website
- Committee on Justice

The Philippine House Committee on Justice, or House Justice Committee is a standing committee of the Philippine House of Representatives.

Its chairperson also sits as an ex officio member of the Judicial and Bar Council from January 1 to June 30 of the calendar year.

== Jurisdiction ==
As prescribed by House Rules, the committee's jurisdiction includes the following:

- Administration of justice
- Adult probation
- Definition of crimes and other offenses punishable by law and their penalties
- Deportation
- Immigration
- Impeachment proceedings
- Judiciary
- Legal aid
- Naturalization
- Penitentiaries and reform schools
- Practice of law and integration of the Bar
- Registration of land titles

== Members, 20th Congress ==
As of June 30, 2025, all committee membership positions are vacant until the House convenes for its first regular session on July 28.

Position	Member	Constituency	Party
Chairperson	Gerville "Jinky Bitrics" Luistro	Batangas–2nd	Lakas
Vice Chairpersons	Mauricio Domogan	Baguio–Lone	Lakas
Vice Chairpersons	Jose Alvarez	Palawan–2nd	NPC
Vice Chairpersons	Danny Domingo	Bulacan–1st	NUP
Vice Chairpersons	Jonathan Keith Flores	Bukidnon–2nd	Lakas
Vice Chairpersons	Alfredo Garbin Jr.	Partylist	Ako Bicol
Vice Chairpersons	Jennifer "Karen" A. Lagbas	Misamis Oriental–1st	NUP
Vice Chairpersons	Brian Poe Llamanzares	Partylist	FPJ Panday Bayanihan
Vice Chairpersons	Bel Zamora	San Juan–Lone	Lakas
Members for the Majority	Aniela Tolentino	Cavite–8th	NUP
Members for the Majority	Benny Abante	Manila–6th	NUP
Members for the Majority	Jude Acidre	Partylist	Tingog Party List
Members for the Majority	Jose "Joboy" Aquino II	Butuan–Lone	Lakas
Members for the Majority	Bernadette S. Barbers	Surigao del Norte–2nd	Nacionalista
Members for the Majority	Joel Chua	Manila–3rd	Lakas
Members for the Majority	Ernix Dionisio	Manila–1st	Lakas
Members for the Majority	Rodge Gutierrez	Partylist	1-Rider Partylist
Members for the Majority	Andrew Julian Romualdez	Partylist	Tingog Party List
Members for the Majority	Lordan Suan	Cagayan de Oro–1st	Lakas
Members for the Majority	Mika Suansing	Nueva Ecija–1st	PFP
Members for the Majority	Patrick Michael Vargas	Quezon City–5th	PFP
Members for the Minority	Terry Ridon	Partylist	Bicol Saro
Members for the Minority	Renee Co	Partylist	Kabataan
Members for the Minority	Chel Diokno	Partylist	Akbayan
Members for the Minority	Sarah Elago	Partylist	Gabriela Women's Party
Members for the Minority	Allan U. Ty	Partylist	LPGMA

=== Member for the Majority ===
- Romeo Acop (Note: Died on December 20, 2025.) (Antipolo–2nd, NUP)

== Historical membership rosters ==
=== 19th Congress ===
Position	Members	Party	Province/City	District
Chairperson	Juliet Marie Ferrer	NUP	Negros Occidental	4th
Vice Chairpersons	Migs Nograles	PBA	Party-list	
Vice Chairpersons	Loreto Acharon	NPC	General Santos	At-large
Vice Chairpersons	Jonathan Keith Flores	Lakas–CMD	Bukidnon	2nd
Vice Chairpersons	Pablo John Garcia	NUP	Cebu	3rd
Vice Chairpersons	Ruwel Peter S. Gonzaga	PFP	Davao de Oro	2nd
Vice Chairpersons	Virgilio S. Lacson	Manila Teachers	Party-list	
Vice Chairpersons	Gerville "Jinky Bitrics" Luistro	Lakas–CMD	Batangas	2nd
Vice Chairpersons	Bel Zamora	Lakas–CMD	San Juan	At-large
Members for the Majority	Ferjenel Biron	Nacionalista	Iloilo	4th
Members for the Majority	Jude Acidre	Tingog	Party-list	
Members for the Majority	Romeo Acop	NUP	Antipolo	2nd
Members for the Majority	Maria Rachel Arenas	Lakas–CMD	Pangasinan	3rd
Members for the Majority	Julienne "Jam" Baronda	Lakas–CMD	Iloilo City	At-large
Members for the Majority	Jil Bongalon	Ako Bicol	Party-list	
Members for the Majority	Arthur "Art" F. Celeste Sr.	Nacionalista	Pangasinan	1st
Members for the Majority	Elizaldy Co	Ako Bicol	Party-list	
Members for the Majority	Jaime Fresnedi	Liberal	Muntinlupa	At-large
Members for the Majority	Dante S. Garcia	Lakas–CMD	La Union	2nd
Members for the Majority	Olga "Ara" T. Kho	Lakas–CMD	Masbate	2nd
Members for the Majority	Roy Loyola	NPC	Cavite	5th
Members for the Majority	Ramon C. Nolasco Jr.	Lakas–CMD	Cagayan	1st
Members for the Majority	Rufus Rodriguez	CDP	Cagayan de Oro	2nd
Members for the Majority	Laarni Roque	Nacionalista	Bukidnon	4th
Members for the Majority	Ron P. Salo	Kabayan	Party-list	
Members for the Majority	Shernee Tan-Tambut	Kusug Tausug	Party-list	
Members for the Majority	Caroline Tanchay	SAGIP	Party-list	
Members for the Majority	Irwin Tieng	Lakas–CMD	Manila	5th
Members for the Majority	Allan U. Ty	LPGMA	Party-list	
Members for the Majority	Zaldy Villa	Lakas–CMD	Siquijor	At-large
Members for the Majority	Eddie Villanueva	CIBAC	Party-list	
Members for the Majority	Brian Yamsuan	Bicol Saro	Party-list	
Members for the Majority	Divina Grace Yu	Lakas–CMD	Zamboanga del Sur	1st
Members for the Minority	Stephen Paduano	Abang Lingkod	Party-list	
Members for the Minority	Arlene Brosas	Gabriela	Party-list	
Members for the Minority	Sergio Dagooc	APEC	Party-list	
Members for the Minority	Rodge Gutierrez	1-Rider	Party-list	
Members for the Minority	Raoul Manuel	Kabataan	Party-list	
Members for the Minority	Jose Gay Padiernos	GP	Party-list	

=== 18th Congress ===
Position	Members	Party	Province/City	District
Chairperson	Vicente Veloso III	NUP	Leyte	3rd
Vice Chairpersons	Rufus Rodriguez	CDP	Cagayan de Oro	2nd
Vice Chairpersons	Naealla Bainto-Aguinaldo	BAHAY	Party-list	
Vice Chairpersons	Jonathan Keith Flores	PDP–Laban	Bukidnon	2nd
Vice Chairpersons	Juan Fidel Felipe F. Nograles	Lakas–CMD	Rizal	4th
Vice Chairpersons	Alfredo Garbin Jr.	Ako Bicol	Party-list	
Vice Chairpersons	Ramon Nolasco Jr.	NUP	Cagayan	1st
Members for the Majority	Cyrille Abueg-Zaldivar	PPP	Palawan	2nd
Members for the Majority	Ruwel Peter Gonzaga	PDP–Laban	Davao de Oro	2nd
Members for the Majority	Paulino Salvador Leachon	PDP–Laban	Oriental Mindoro	1st
Members for the Majority	Cheryl Deloso-Montalla	NPC	Zambales	2nd
Members for the Majority	Tyrone Agabas	NPC	Pangasinan	6th
Members for the Majority	Peter John Calderon	NPC	Cebu	7th
Members for the Majority	Dahlia Loyola	NPC	Cavite	5th
Members for the Majority	Manny Lopez	PDP–Laban	Manila	1st
Members for the Majority	Corazon Nuñez-Malanyaon	Nacionalista	Davao Oriental	1st
Members for the Majority	Josephine Ramirez-Sato	Liberal	Occidental Mindoro	At-large
Members for the Majority	Aleta Suarez	Lakas	Quezon	3rd
Members for the Majority	Hector Sanchez	Lakas	Catanduanes	At-large
Members for the Majority	Edcel Lagman	Liberal	Albay	1st
Members for the Majority	Eric Yap	ACT-CIS	Party-list	
Members for the Minority	Lawrence Lemuel Fortun	Nacionalista	Agusan del Norte	1st
Members for the Minority	Argel Joseph Cabatbat	Magsasaka	Party-list	
Members for the Minority	Stella Quimbo	Liberal	Marikina	2nd
Members for the Minority	Arnolfo Teves Jr.	PDP–Laban	Negros Oriental	3rd
Members for the Minority	Arlene Brosas	Gabriela	Party-list	

== See also ==
- House of Representatives of the Philippines
- List of Philippine House of Representatives committees
- Department of Justice
