= Philippine House Committee on Human Rights =

Standing committee of the House of Representatives of the Philippines

Committee on Human Rights
- 20th Congress

History
- New session started: To convene on July 28, 2025

Leadership
- Chairman: Benny Abante
- Minority Leader: Vacant

Website
- Committee on Human Rights

The Philippine House Committee on Human Rights, or House Human Rights Committee is a standing committee of the Philippine House of Representatives.

== Jurisdiction ==
As prescribed by House Rules, the committee's jurisdiction includes the following:

- Assistance to victims of human rights violations and their families
- Prevention of human rights violations
- Protection and enhancement of human rights
- Punishment of perpetrators of human rights violations

== Members, 20th Congress ==
As of June 30, 2025, all committee membership positions are vacant until the House convenes for its first regular session on July 28.

== Historical membership rosters ==
=== 18th Congress ===
Position	Members	Party	Province/City	District
Chairperson	Jesus Manuel Suntay	PDP–Laban	Quezon City	4th
Vice Chairpersons	Ron Salo	KABAYAN	Party-list	
Vice Chairpersons	Anthony Peter Crisologo	NUP	Quezon City	1st
Members for the Majority	Edcel Lagman	Liberal	Albay	1st
Members for the Majority	Cheryl Deloso-Montalla	Liberal	Zambales	2nd
Members for the Majority	Henry Villarica	PDP–Laban	Bulacan	4th
Members for the Majority	Josefina Tallado	PDP–Laban	Camarines Norte	1st
Members for the Majority	Marisol Panotes	PDP–Laban	Camarines Norte	2nd
Members for the Majority	Cyrille Abueg-Zaldivar	PPP	Palawan	2nd
Members for the Majority	Ma. Fe Abunda	PDP–Laban	Eastern Samar	Lone
Members for the Majority	Ma. Angelica Amante-Matba	PDP–Laban	Agusan del Norte	2nd
Members for the Majority	Leonardo Babasa Jr.	PDP–Laban	Zamboanga del Sur	2nd
Members for the Majority	Jose Francisco Benitez	PDP–Laban	Negros Occidental	3rd
Members for the Majority	Cesar Jimenez Jr.	PDP–Laban	Zamboanga City	1st
Members for the Majority	Luisa Lloren Cuaresma	NUP	Nueva Vizcaya	Lone
Members for the Majority	Amihilda Sangcopan	Anak Mindanao	Party-list	
Members for the Majority	Angelina Tan	NPC	Quezon	4th
Members for the Minority	Lawrence Lemuel Fortun	Nacionalista	Agusan del Norte	1st
Members for the Minority	Argel Joseph Cabatbat	MAGSASAKA	Party-list	
Members for the Minority	Sarah Jane Elago	Kabataan	Party-list	

=== 19th Congress ===
Position	Members	Party	Province/City	District
Chairperson	Bienvenido Abante Jr.	NUP	Manila	6th
Vice Chairpersons	Edward Michael Maceda	NPC	Manila	4th
Vice Chairpersons	Eduardo Villanueva	CIBAC	Party-list	
Members for the Majority	Edcel Lagman	Liberal	Albay	1st
Members for the Majority	Ziaur-Rahman Adiong	Lakas–CMD	Lanao del Sur	1st
Members for the Majority	Oscar Malapitan	Nacionalista	Caloocan	1st
Members for the Majority	Ricardo Cruz Jr.	Nacionalista	Taguig, Pateros	1st
Members for the Majority	Ernesto Dionisio Jr.	Lakas–CMD	Manila	1st
Members for the Majority	Mary Mitzi Cajayon-Uy	PDP–Laban	Caloocan	2nd
Members for the Majority	Patrick Michael Vargas	Lakas-CMD	Quezon City	5th
Members for the Majority	Jonathan Keith Flores	Nacionalista	Bukidnon	2nd
Members for the Majority	Joseph Lara	Lakas-CMD	Cagayan	3rd
Members for the Majority	Vincent Garcia	NPC	Davao City	2nd
Members for the Majority	Roman Romulo	Independent	Pasig	Lone
Members for the Majority	Pablo John Garcia	NUP	Cebu	3rd
Members for the Majority	Edward Hagedorn	PDP–Laban	Palawan	3rd
Members for the Majority	Jaime Fresnedi	Liberal	Muntinlupa	Lone
Members for the Majority	Rufus Rodriguez	CDP	Cagayan de Oro	2nd
Members for the Minority	Arlene Brosas	GABRIELA	Party-list	
Members for the Minority	Raoul Danniel Manuel	Kabataan	Party-list	
Members for the Minority	Gabriel Bordado	Liberal	Camarines Sur	3rd
Members for the Minority	Bonifacio Bosita	1-Rider Partylist	Party-list	

== See also ==
- House of Representatives of the Philippines
- List of Philippine House of Representatives committees
- Commission on Human Rights
- Human rights in the Philippines
