= Philippine House Committee on Women and Gender Equality =

Standing committee of the House of Representatives of the Philippines

Committee on Women and Gender Equality
- 20th Congress

History
- New session started: August 5, 2025

Leadership
- Chairperson: Ann Matibag, Lakas since August 5, 2025
- Minority Leader: Vacant since June 30, 2025

Website
- Committee on Women and Gender Equality

The Philippine House Committee on Women and Gender Equality, or House Women and Gender Equality Committee is a standing committee of the Philippine House of Representatives.

== Jurisdiction ==
As prescribed by House Rules, the committee's jurisdiction is on the rights and welfare of women and female children and youth, including their education, employment and working conditions, and their role in nation building, and all concerns relating to gender equality.

== Members, 20th Congress ==
Position	Members	Constituency	Party
Chairperson	Ann Matibag	Laguna–1st	Lakas
Vice Chairpersons	Alexandria Gonzales	Mandaluyong at-large	NUP
Vice Chairpersons	Rosalie Salvame	Palawan–1st	PRP
Vice Chairpersons	Florabel Yatco	Party-list	Nanay
Vice Chairpersons	Patricia Calderon	Cebu–7th	NPC
Vice Chairpersons	Josefina Tallado	Camarines Norte–1st	Lakas
Vice Chairpersons	Sittie Aminah Dimaporo	Lanao del Norte–2nd	Lakas
Vice Chairpersons	Kathryn Joyce Gorriceta	Iloilo–2nd	Lakas
Members for the Majority	Aniela Bianca Tolentino	Cavite–8th	NUP
Members for the Majority	Ma. Cristina Angeles	Tarlac–2nd	PFP
Members for the Majority	Mercedes Alvarez	Negros Occidental–6th	NPC
Members for the Majority	Eleanor Bulut–Begtang	Apayao at-large	NPC
Members for the Majority	Giselle Mary Maceda	Manila–4th	Asenso
Members for the Majority	Rebecca Ma. Ynares	Rizal–1st	NPC
Members for the Majority	Linabelle Ruth Villarica	Bulacan–4th	PFP
Members for the Majority	Marlesa Hofer–Hasim	Zamboanga Sibugay–2nd	PFP
Members for the Majority	Janette Garin	Iloilo–1st	Lakas
Members for the Majority	Midy Cua	Quirino at-large	Lakas
Members for the Majority	Gerville Luistro	Batangas–2nd	Lakas
Members for the Majority	Dimple Mastura	Maguindanao del Norte at-large	Lakas
Members for the Majority	Jeyzel Victoria Yu	Zamboanga del Sur–2nd	Lakas
Members for the Majority	Agatha Paula Cruz	Bulacan–5th	Lakas
Members for the Majority	Katrina Reiko Chua-Tai	Zamboanga City–1st	Independent
Members for the Majority	Caroline Agyao	Kalinga at-large	PFP
Members for the Majority	Ma. Vanessa Aumentado	Bohol–2nd	Lakas
Members for the Majority	Rhea Mae Gullas	Cebu–1st	Lakas
Members for the Majority	Ysabel Ma. Zamora	San Juan at-large	Lakas
Members for the Majority	Gloria Macapagal–Arroyo	Pampanga–2nd	Lakas
Members for the Majority	Janice Degamo	Negros Oriental–3rd	Lakas
Members for the Minority	Arlyn Ayon	Party-list	SWERTE Patylist
Members for the Minority	Renee Louise Co	Party-list	Kabataan Partylist
Members for the Minority	Dadah Kiram Ismula	Party-list	Akbayan
Members for the Minority	Iris Marie Montes	Party-list	4K Partylist
Members for the Minority	Audrey Kay Zubiri	Bukidnon–3rd	PFP

== Historical membership rosters ==
=== 18th Congress ===
Position	Members	Constituency	Party
Chairperson	Ma. Lourdes Acosta-Alba	Bukidnon–1st	Bukidnon Paglaum
Vice Chairpersons	Geraldine Roman	Bataan–1st	PDP–Laban
Vice Chairpersons	Yedda Marie Romualdez	Party-list	Tingog Sinirangan
Vice Chairpersons	Lucy Torres-Gomez	Manila–1st	PDP–Laban
Vice Chairpersons	Sol Aragones	Laguna–3rd	Nacionalista
Members for the Majority	Rosanna Vergara	Nueva Ecija–3rd	PDP–Laban
Members for the Majority	Ruth Mariano-Hernandez	Laguna–2nd	Independent
Members for the Majority	Alyssa Sheena Tan	Isabela–4th	PFP
Members for the Majority	Joy Myra Tambunting	Parañaque–2nd	NUP
Members for the Majority	Maricel Natividad-Nagaño	Nueva Ecija–4th	PRP
Members for the Majority	Kristine Alexie Besas-Tutor	Bohol–3rd	Nacionalista
Members for the Majority	Ma. Lucille Nava	Guimaras–Lone	PDP–Laban
Members for the Majority	Ma. Angelica Amante-Matba	Agusan del Norte–2nd	PDP–Laban
Members for the Majority	Josefina Tallado	Camarines Norte–1st	PDP–Laban
Members for the Majority	Glona Labadlabad	Zamboanga del Norte–2nd	PDP–Laban
Members for the Majority	Alfred Vargas	Quezon City–5th	PDP–Laban
Members for the Majority	Ma. Lourdes Arroyo	Negros Occidental–5th	Lakas
Members for the Majority	Paz Radaza	Lapu-Lapu City–Lone	Lakas
Members for the Majority	Aleta Suarez	Quezon–3rd	Lakas
Members for the Majority	Julienne Baronda	Iloilo City–Lone	NUP
Members for the Majority	Lorna Silverio	Bulacan–3rd	NUP
Members for the Majority	Cheryl Deloso-Montalla	Zambales–2nd	Liberal
Members for the Majority	Jocelyn Limkaichong	Negros Oriental–1st	Liberal
Members for the Majority	Sharon Garin	Partylist	AAMBIS-OWA
Members for the Majority	Shernee Tan	Partylist	Kusug Tausug
Members for the Majority	Shirlyn Bañas-Nograles	South Cotabato–1st	PDP–Laban
Members for the Majority	Dahlia Loyola	Cavite–5th	NPC
Members for the Minority	Arlene Brosas	Partylist	Gabriela
Members for the Minority	Irene Gay Saulog	Partylist	Kalinga
Members for the Minority	Angelica Natasha Co	Partylist	BHW
Members for the Minority	Stella Luz Quimbo	Marikina–2nd	Liberal
Members for the Minority	Sarah Jane Elago	Partylist	Kabataan

== See also ==
- House of Representatives of the Philippines
- List of Philippine House of Representatives committees
