= Philippine House Committee on Public Accounts =

Standing committee of the House of Representatives of the Philippines

Committee on Public Accounts
- 20th Congress

History
- New session started: July 28, 2025

Leadership
- Chairman: Terry Ridon, Bicol Saro since July 30, 2025

Website
- Committee on Public Accounts

The Philippine House Committee on Public Accounts, or House Public Accounts Committee is a standing committee of the Philippine House of Representatives.

== Jurisdiction ==
As prescribed by House Rules, the committee's jurisdiction is on the scrutiny and examination of audit reports on the government agencies' performance to determine their compliance or adherence to the plans and program authorized through the appropriation approved by the Congress.

== Members, 20th Congress ==
As of June 30, 2025, all committee membership positions are vacant until the House convenes for its first regular session on July 28.

== Historical membership rosters ==
=== 19th Congress ===
| Position | Members | Party | Province/City | District |
|---|---|---|---|---|
| Chairperson | Stephen Paduano | Abang Lingkod | Party-list | |

=== 18th Congress ===
| Position | Members | Party | Province/City | District |
|---|---|---|---|---|
| Chairperson | Jose Singson Jr. | Probinsyano Ako | Party-list | |
| Vice Chairpersons | Arnulf Bryan Fuentebella | NPC | Camarines Sur | 4th |
| Vice Chairpersons | Luis Ferrer IV | NUP | Cavite | 6th |
| Vice Chairpersons | Ron Salo | KABAYAN | Party-list | |
| Vice Chairpersons | Jose Antonio Sy-Alvarado | NUP | Bulacan | 1st |
| Vice Chairpersons | Rodante Marcoleta | SAGIP | Party-list | |
| Vice Chairpersons | Eleandro Jesus Madrona | Nacionalista | Romblon | At-large |
| Vice Chairpersons | Robert Ace Barbers | Nacionalista | Surigao del Norte | 2nd |
| Vice Chairpersons | David "Jay-Jay" Suarez | Nacionalista | Quezon | 2nd |
| Members for the Majority | Elenita Milagros Ermita-Buhain | Nacionalista | Batangas | 1st |
| Members for the Majority | Teodorico Haresco Jr. | Nacionalista | Aklan | 2nd |
| Members for the Majority | Ansaruddin Abdul Malik Adiong | Nacionalista | Lanao del Sur | 1st |
| Members for the Majority | Sol Aragones | Nacionalista | Laguna | 3rd |
| Members for the Majority | Divina Grace Yu | PDP–Laban | Zamboanga del Sur | 1st |
| Members for the Majority | Emmarie Ouano-Dizon | PDP–Laban | Cebu | 6th |
| Members for the Majority | Ma. Angelica Amante-Matba | PDP–Laban | Agusan del Norte | 2nd |
| Members for the Majority | Lorna Silverio | NUP | Bulacan | 3rd |
| Members for the Majority | Rashidin Matba | PDP–Laban | Tawi-Tawi | Lone |
| Members for the Majority | Gavini Pancho | NUP | Bulacan | 2nd |
| Members for the Majority | Pablo C. Ortega | NPC | La Union | 1st |
| Members for the Majority | Allan Benedict Reyes | PFP | Quezon City | 3rd |
| Members for the Majority | Tyrone Agabas | NPC | Pangasinan | 6th |
| Members for the Majority | Presley de Jesus | Philreca | Party-list | |
| Members for the Majority | Anthony Peter Crisologo | NUP | Quezon City | 1st |
| Members for the Majority | Adriano Ebcas | Ako Padayon | Party-list | |
| Members for the Majority | Allan Ty | LPGMA | Party-list | |
| Members for the Majority | Enrico Pineda | 1PACMAN | Party-list | |
| Members for the Majority | Jose Gay Padiernos | GP | Party-list | |
| Members for the Majority | Eric Yap | ACT-CIS | Party-list | |
| Members for the Majority | Maricel Natividad-Nagaño | PRP | Nueva Ecija | 4th |
| Members for the Majority | Alfred delos Santos | Ang Probinsyano | Party-list | |
| Members for the Majority | Jorge Antonio Bustos | Patrol | Party-list | |
| Members for the Majority | Jake Vincent Villa | NPC | Siquijor | Lone |
| Members for the Majority | Vicente Veloso III | NUP | Leyte | 3rd |
| Members for the Minority | Bayani Fernando | NPC | Marikina | 1st |
| Members for the Minority | Arnolfo Teves Jr. | PDP–Laban | Negros Oriental | 3rd |
| Members for the Minority | Arlene Brosas | Gabriela | Party-list | |
| Members for the Minority | Ferdinand Gaite | Bayan Muna | Party-list | |
| Members for the Minority | Lawrence Lemuel Fortun | Nacionalista | Agusan del Norte | 1st |

==== Chairperson ====
- Michael Defensor (ANAKALUSUGAN) September 30, 2019 – December 16, 2020

== See also ==
- House of Representatives of the Philippines
- List of Philippine House of Representatives committees
