= Raymond Palatino =

Filipino politician

Raymond V. Palatino
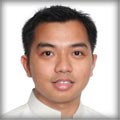
- Official portrait, 2010

Member of the Philippine House of Representatives for Kabataan
- In office June 30, 2007 – June 30, 2013
- Succeeded by: Terry Ridon

Personal details
- Born: Raymond de Vera Palatino; December 19, 1979 (age 46) Quezon City, Philippines
- Party: Kabataan; Bayan; Makabayan
- Spouse: Frances Bondoc
- Children: 2
- Profession: Writer, journalist

Raymond "Mong" de Vera Palatino (born December 19, 1979) is a Filipino writer, journalist, politician, and activist. He represented Kabataan Partylist in the 14th and 15th Congress of the Philippines. He is currently the secretary-general of Bagong Alyansang Makabayan. As a writer, he was a contributor for Tinig, Yehey! and UPI-Asia. He is currently the Southeast Asia editor for Global Voices, contributor to ASEAN Beat and The Diplomat, Bulatlat, Manila Today, and New Mandala.

Palatino became a member of the House of Representatives following the decision of the Philippine Supreme Court declaring the entitlement of Kabataan Party to a seat in the House of Representatives. A graduate of education from the University of the Philippines Diliman, Palatino was active in student politics. He was chairperson of the college student council in 1999. A year after that, he was elected as chairperson of the University Student Council. He joined Global Voices Online In June 2006 and he is currently the regional editor for Southeast Asia.

In 2001, Palatino was elected as the national president of the National Union of Students of the Philippines (NUSP), the biggest alliance of student councils and governments in the Philippines.

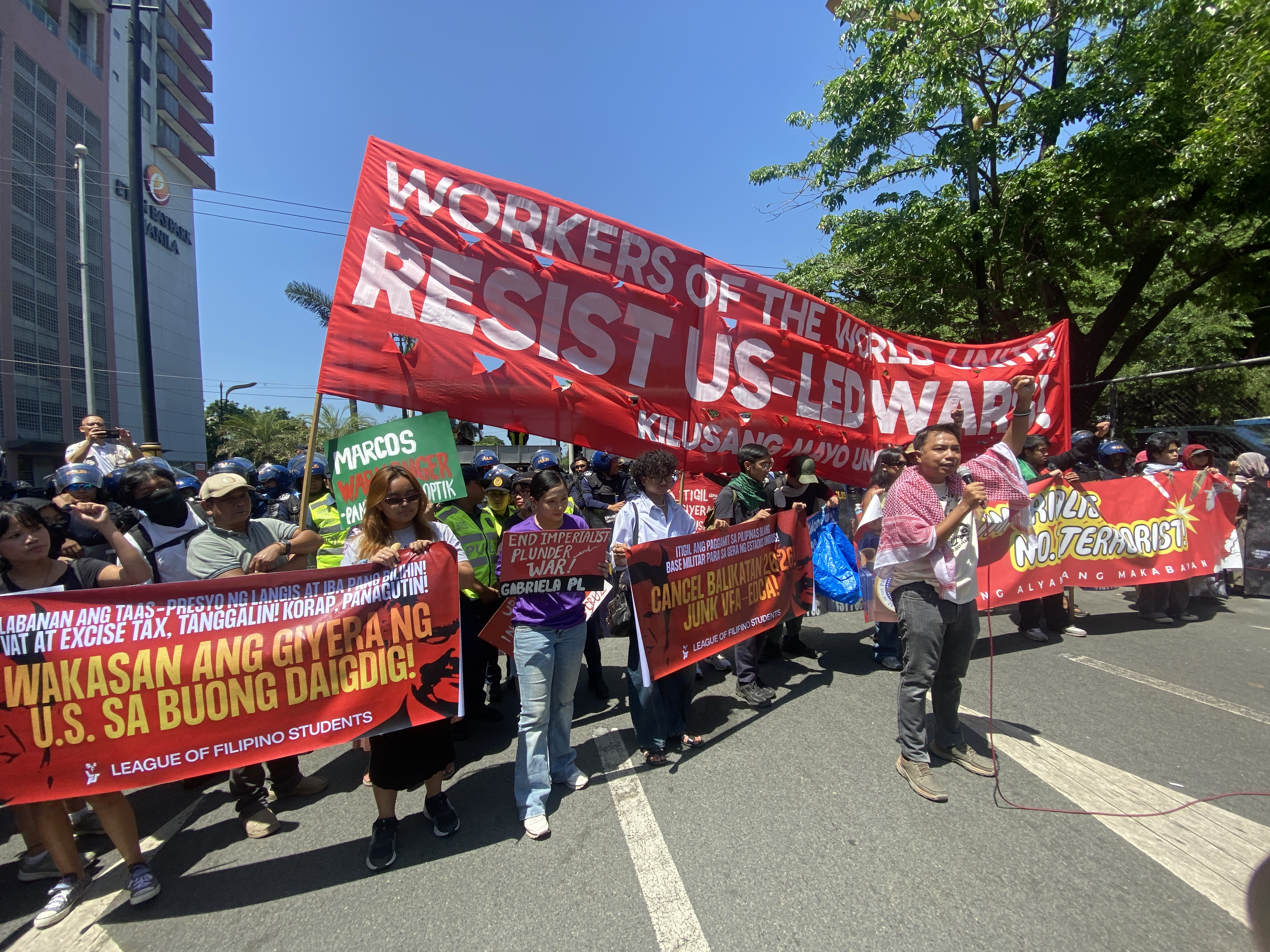
Palatino speaking in a rally against US imperialism, April 9, 2026.

Palatino was one of the convenors of different broad youth formations, including the Estrada Resign Youth Movement (ERYM), Youth Action Network (YAN), Filipino Youth for Peace, Kabataan Kontra-Kartel (Youth Against the Oil Cartel), and TxtPower. Palatino was awarded by the United Nations Association of the Philippines (UNAP) for "youth empowerment on national concerns".
