= Revolutionary Proletarian Army =

1996–2013 military wing of the Philippine Revolutionary Workers' Party

Revolutionary Proletarian Army-Alex Boncayao Brigade
- Other name: RPA-ABB
- Leaders: Arturo Tabara †; Stephen Paduano aka. "Carapali Lualhati" (until 2013)
- Founded: 1996
- Dissolved: 2013
- Split from: Communist Party of the Philippines
- Country: Philippines
- Active regions: Visayas
- Ideology: Marxism–Leninism
- Political position: Far-left

The Revolutionary Proletarian Army, also known by the acronym RPA, was the military wing of the Revolutionary Workers' Party (Rebolusyonaryong Partido ng Manggagawà ng Pilipinas) (RPM-P), a communist party that split from the Communist Party of the Philippines.

== Background ==
The Rebolusyonaryong Partido ng Manggagawà ng Pilipinas ("Revolutionary Workers' Party of the Philippines") was established after the Negros Regional Party Committee of the New People's Army broke away from the Communist Party of the Philippines as a result of an ideological split in 1996. It organized its military arm two months after the split, calling it the Revolutionary Proletarian Army. The Metro Manila-based Alex Boncayao Brigade, which also broke away from the New People's Army, allied itself with the RPA the year after, forming the Revolutionary Proletarian Army – Alex Boncayao Brigade (RPA-ABB).

== Activities ==
The Revolutionary Proletarian Army – Alex Boncayao Brigade engaged in peace negotiations brokered by Eduardo Cojuangco Jr. with the government of Joseph Estrada in 1999; a truce was established in December 2000. This development prompted a vehement condemnation from Filemon Lagman, who once controlled the Alex Boncayao Brigade; in a press release he branded Arturo Tabara of the RPA and Nilo dela Cruz, the head of the ABB as "scoundrels masquerading as revolutionaries". By 2003, relations between the RPA-ABB and the Communist Party of the Philippines had deteriorated to the point where the New People's Army, the CPP's military wing began launching attacks on the RPA-ABB. Arturo Tabara, RPM-P chairman, was assassinated in 2004 in Manila.

In 2007, an apparent split occurred between two factions within the RPA-ABB. Nilo dela Cruz of the Alex Boncayao Brigade was expelled by the faction headed by Stephen Paduano and Veronica Tabara, Arturo Tabara's wife. Dela Cruz reciprocated the action, expelling Paduano. Both factions of the RPA-ABB carried on using the same name.

In April 2013, the RPA-ABB was reported to have changed its name to Kapatiran para sa Progresong Panlipunan ("Brotherhood for Social Progress") and stated that it had renounced violence as a method of advancing its cause. Paduano resigned as national commander of the RPA-ABB and ran for Congress during the 2013 Philippine general election under the Abang Lingkod party-list. He took his oath of office in May 2014. The National Democratic Front of the Philippines issued a statement condemning his election into the Congress of the Philippines.

As of 2016, the peace deal signed by the RPA-ABB with the Estrada administration remains to be fully implemented. Nilo dela Cruz and a group of former RPA-ABB members calling themselves "Democratic Front for Filipinism" issued a statement supporting Rodrigo Duterte's war on drugs, and his "revolution against the oligarchs and the exploiters of the Filipino masses".
