= Renee Co =

Filipino lawyer and activist (born 1997)

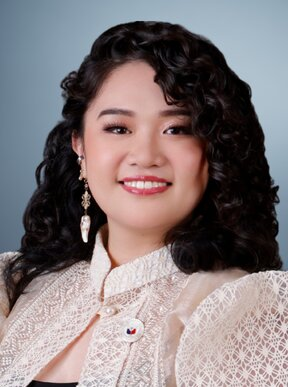
- Official portrait, 2025

Member of the Philippine House of Representatives for Kabataan Partylist
- Incumbent
- Assumed office June 30, 2025
- Preceded by: Raoul Manuel
- Constituency: Party-list

Assistant Minority Floor Leader
- Incumbent
- Assumed office July 30, 2025
- Leader: Marcelino Libanan

Personal details
- Born: Renee Louise Manda Co; November 3, 1997 (age 29)
- Party: Kabataan (party-list)
- Other political affiliations: Makabayan
- Education: University of the Philippines Diliman (BA, JD)
- Occupation: Politician; activist
- Profession: Lawyer

Renee Louise Manda Co (born November 3, 1997) is a Filipino politician and lawyer who is the representative for Kabataan Partylist, having been elected in 2025.

Born in Manila, Co studied political science at the University of the Philippines Diliman, where she was involved with campus journalism and student activism. She pursued Juris Doctor at the University of the Philippines College of Law and graduated in 2023, passing the Philippine Bar Examinations the same year. In the 2025 Philippine House of Representatives elections, Kabataan named Co as their first nominee to the chamber. The partylist attained enough votes to secure Co a seat in the 20th Congress.

Co is a critic of the economic and defense policies pushed by the administration of President Bongbong Marcos and supports the impeachment of Vice President Sara Duterte.

== Early life and education ==
Co's parents are Cebuano. She is from Malabon and graduated from the Manila Science High School in 2014.

=== Student activism ===
Co pursued higher studies at the University of the Philippines (UP) Diliman College of Social Sciences and Philosophy. While studying at UP, she served as editor-in-chief of the college's official publication, Sinag, and was the chairperson of the local chapter of the Kabataan Partylist in UP Diliman and co-convenor of UP Rises Against Tyranny and Dictatorship (UPRISE). She graduated cum laude with a degree in political science in 2018. After her undergraduate studies, she took and finished law at the UP College of Law in 2023. That same year, she passed the Philippine Bar Examinations.

In January 2021, she was chosen by representatives of student councils from across the UP System to be the 38th Student Regent, succeeding Isaac Punzalan. She denounced the unilateral abrogation of the 1989 UP–Department of National Defense Accord and called the decision "one of the [government's] worst attempts at destroying the institutional safeguards that UP students have fought to put in their struggle for their democratic rights.".

== House of Representatives of the Philippines (from 2025) ==
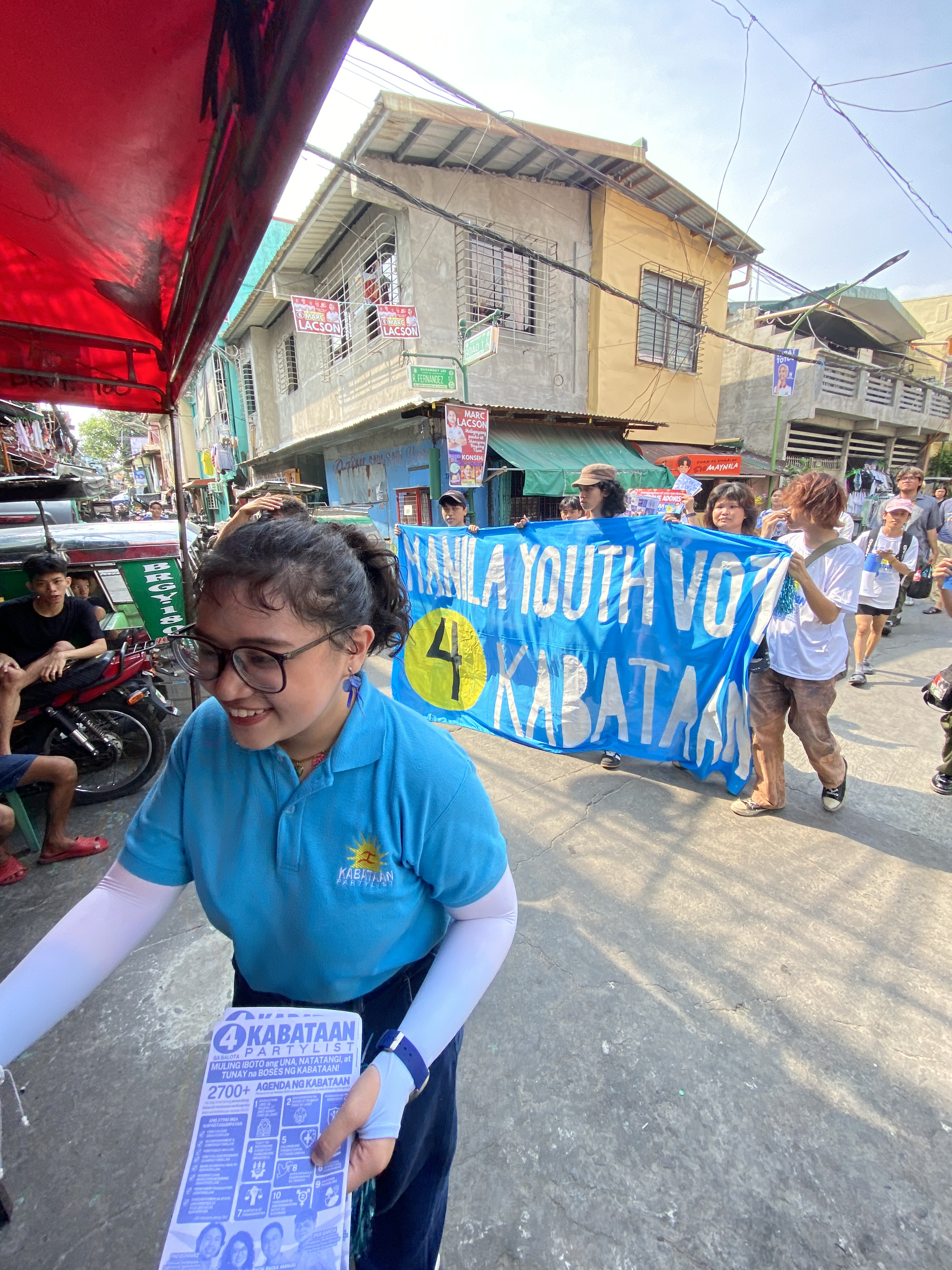
Co during the Kabataan Partylist electoral rally, March 2025.

=== Election ===
Co was chosen as the spokesperson and first nominee of Kabataan Partylist. She previously served as its executive vice president. On October 5, 2024, Kabataan Partylist filed its certificate of nomination and acceptance before the Commission on Elections (COMELEC) with Co as its first nominee, Paolo Echavez as second nominee, and Jpeg Garcia as third nominee.

=== Tenure ===
Co was sworn in as a member of the House of Representatives on June 30, 2025. Co stated that one of the first priorities that Kabataan Partylist would push in the next Congress would be a students' rights bill against campus repression, as well as measures against online sexual exploitation of children and for mental health concerns among the youth. She also said that the youth agenda is against the prevalence of political dynasties in the Philippines.

House Deputy Minority Leader Antonio Tinio, House Assistant Minority Leader Co, and Gabriela party-list Representative Sarah Elago filed in November 2025 a resolution calling for a legislative probe on government officials with alleged links to the flood control corruption scandal, including President Bongbong Marcos, Representative Sandro Marcos, and former Executive Secretary Lucas Bersamin.

== Political positions ==
=== Sara Duterte ===
Co has criticized Vice President Sara Duterte, calling her 'delulu' (slang for delusional) for saying that she is the 'designated survivor' for not attending the 2024 State of the Nation Address of President Bongbong Marcos, citing her alleged misuse of confidential funds and her family's legacy of killings under the war on drugs. Co has been vocal for the impeachment of Vice President Duterte because of said budget anomalies and concerns regarding confidential and intelligence funds. She is one of the complainants who signed the second impeachment complaint on December 4, 2024, citing betrayal of public trust. On February 2, 2026, Makabayan bloc members by Antonio Tinio, Renee Co, and Sarah Elago endorsed an impeachment complaint against Vice President Sara Duterte.

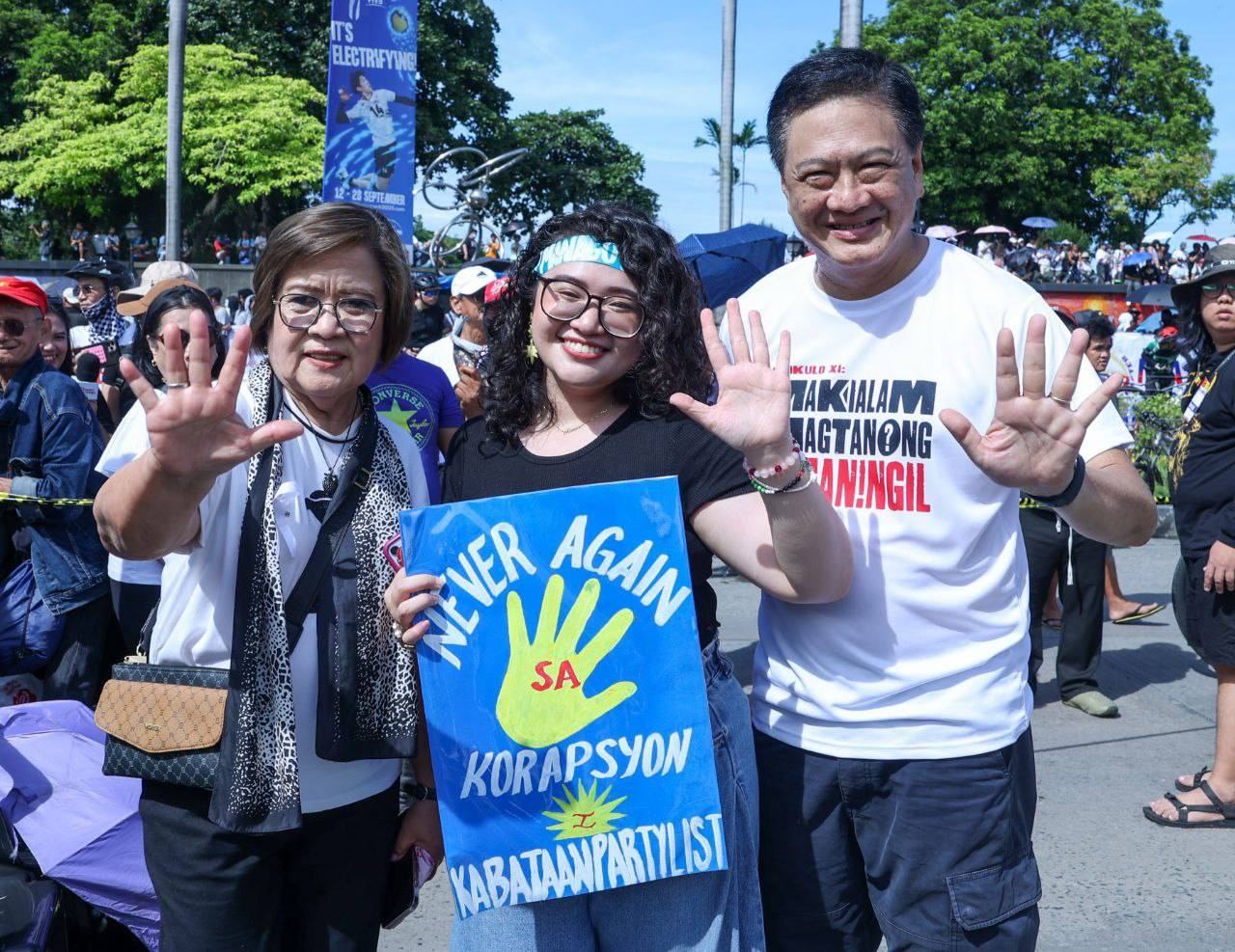
Co, together with Rep. Leila de Lima and former Rep. Erin Tañada at the September 21, 2025 Baha sa Luneta, part of anti-corruption protests.

=== Marcos Jr. administration ===
She and her party have also been critical of the Marcos Jr. administration because of policies such as the Maharlika Wealth Fund. Co has also denounced the reimposition of mandatory Reserve Officers' Training Corps (ROTC), especially with billions of pesos worth of budget cuts for state universities and colleges in the Philippines for 2025 and grave insufficiency for the budget for education. Contrary to mandatory ROTC, she has encouraged the youth to live the ideals and nationalism of José Rizal and Andrés Bonifacio. On January 26, 2026, Makabayan bloc members by Antonio Tinio, Renee Co, and Sarah Elago endorsed an impeachment complaint against President Bongbong Marcos.

== Personal life ==
Renee Co is not related to Ako Bicol partylist representative Zaldy Co. The accusation stems from a viral AI-generated photo that used Google Gemini that featured Zaldy Co and Renee Co hugging.
