= Mimi Doringo =

Philippine activist and politician

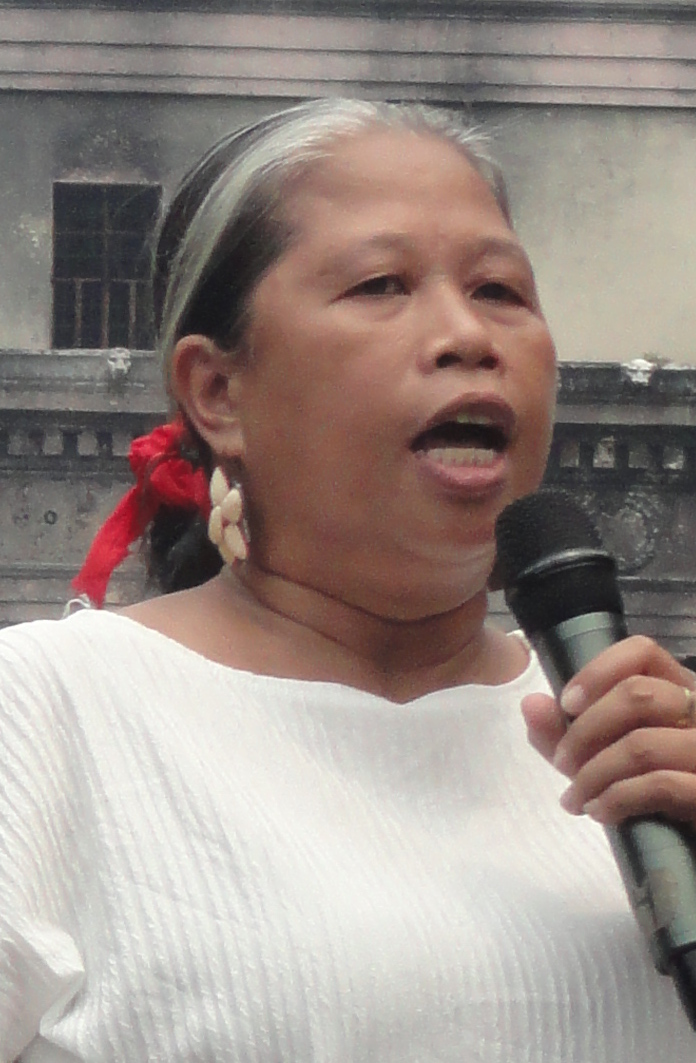
- Doringo at the Senate announcement of Makabayan for the 2025 Philippine general election.

Secretary-General of [[Kalipunan ng Damayang Mahihirap]]

Personal details
- Born: Eufemia Pet Doringo; November 14, 1975 (age 50) Balud, Masbate, Philippines
- Party: Makabayan
- Spouse: Andrew A. Doringo
- Occupation: Urban poor leader, activist

Eufemia Pet "Mimi" Doringo (born November 14, 1975) is an urban poor activist from the Philippines who is the general secretary of the militant group Kadamay. In the 2025 Philippine Senate election, she ran under the Makabayan slate but lost.

== Early life ==
Born in Balud, Masbate, Doringo is the third of five children and grew up in Metro Manila. Her father, Nestor Tintina Pet, is a fisherman before working in Saudi Arabia in 24 years. Meanwhile, her mother, Helen Delos Reyes Kabug, did laundry for a living. She finished elementary at Tandang Sora Elementary School (now known as Don Placido Del Mundo Elementary School), Novaliches, Quezon City.

Because of hardships, she was not able to step into college, working as early as nineteen years old at Ever Bilena. For her, this is her first exposure on the exploitation of workers. She was a contractual worker for two years. She joined an impromptu sit-in protest that the workers did because the company did not give their holiday pay.

In 2012, she joined the urban poor community organization in their neighborhood that crafted a people's plan for in-city relocation.

== Activism ==
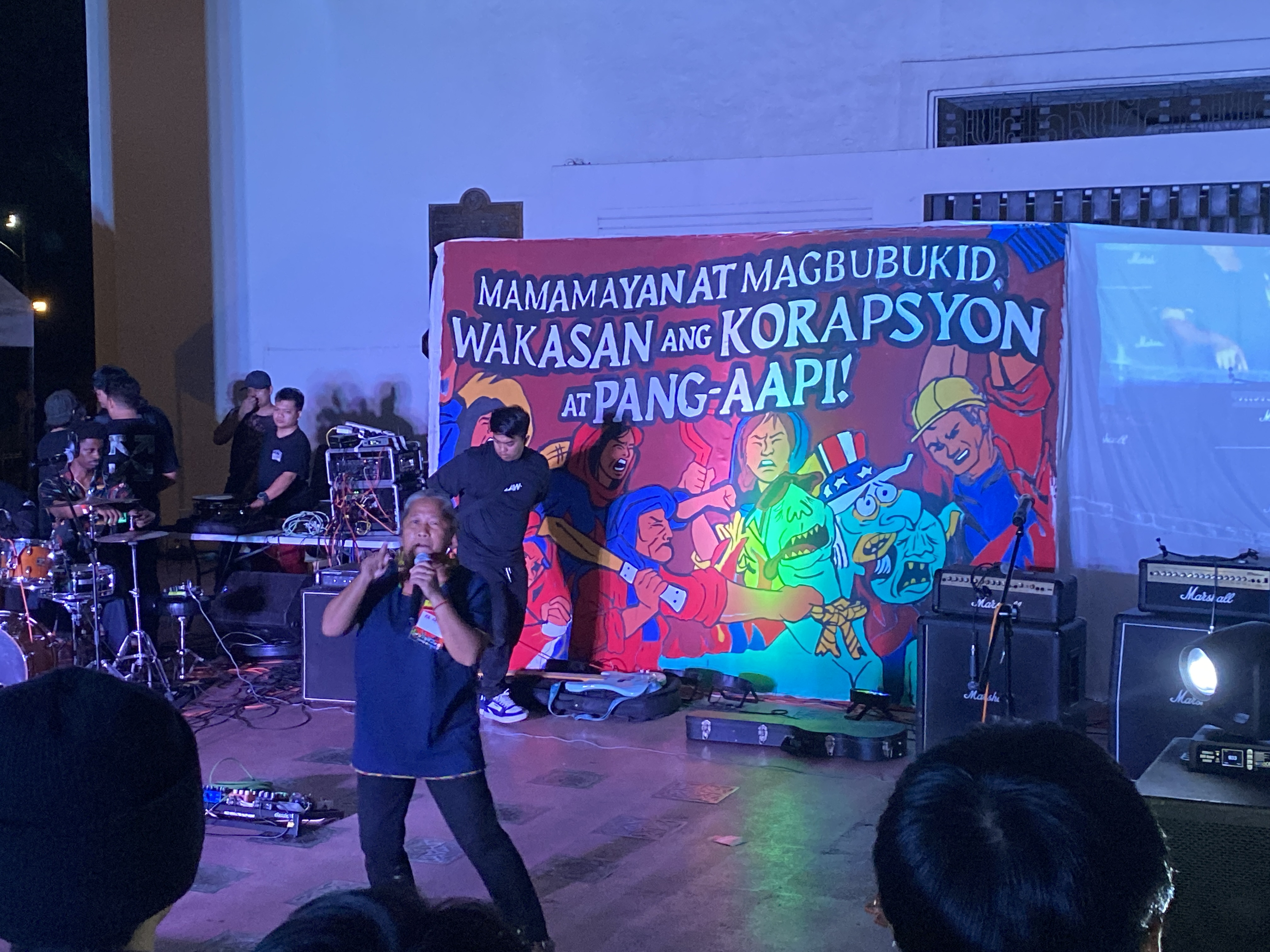
Doringo speaking at a solidarity concert by the Kilusang Magbubukid ng Pilipinas

Doringo became a member of the Kalipunan ng Damayang Mahihirap (Kadamay) in 2017, becoming its national spokesperson in 2018 and National Secretary General in 2020. As an urban poor activist, she has spoken at took part in campaigns and mobilizations most especially affecting the urban poor, such as demolitions, fare hikes, state violence, and lack of decent work. She has stressed the dynamics of women and vendors experiencing worse violence such as confiscations without warnings and lack of access to barangay services.

For speaking up against alleged corruption of the local government of Pandi, especially on housing, she was declared persona non grata in that town in 2021.

In 2022, she spoke against the Maharlika Wealth Fund, invoking that President Bongbong Marcos still has ₱203 billion worth of unpaid taxes.

In May 2024, she criticized Presidential Adviser on Poverty Larry Gadon for saying that the perceived degradation of living conditions in the Philippines are merely "imaginary".

On December 4, 2024, Doringo and 74 others filed the second impeachment complaint against Vice President Sara Duterte, citing betrayal of public trust for her office's alleged misuse of confidential funds. By February 2025, it was consolidated with two other complaints into a single impeachment complaint and signed by 240 lawmakers out of 305, reaching the 1/3 vote threshold and impeaching Vice President Duterte.

On January 26, 2026, Doringo and 35 others filed the second impeachment complaint against President Bongbong Marcos, citing his potential involvement in the "BBM Parametric Formula" used by the Department of Public Works and Highways, which they alleged to have allowed systemic corruption in government, as well as his alleged involvement in kickback schemes and unprogrammed appropriations.

== 2025 Senate run ==
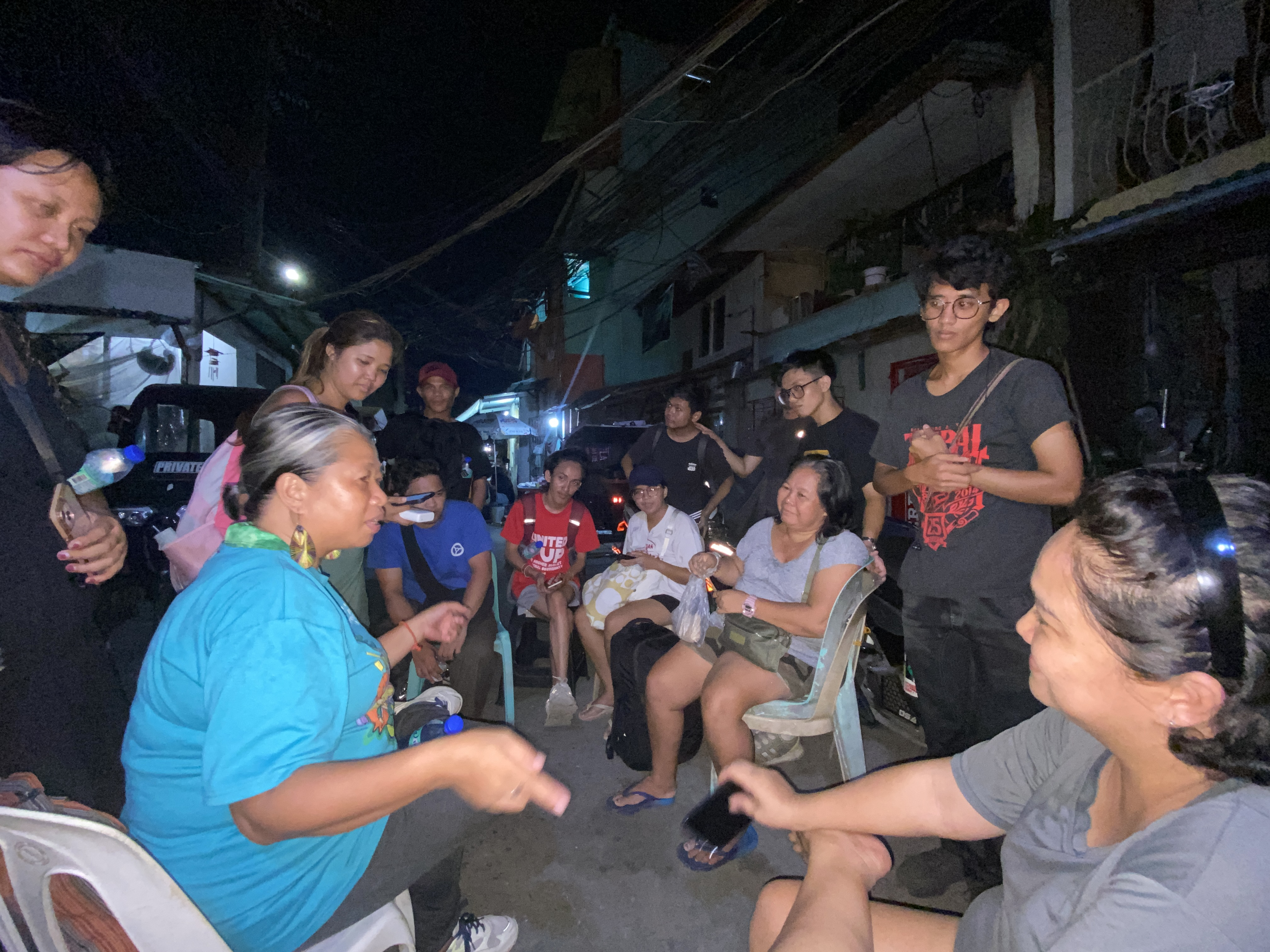
Doringo holding a consultation with an urban poor community under the threat of demolition in Tondo.

She was revealed as part of Makabayan Senatoriable slate on National Heroes Day, August 26, 2024.
