= Kadamay =

Urban poor organization in the Philippines

- Kalipunan ng Damayang Mahihirap
- Formation: November 7, 1998
- Headquarters: Quezon City
- Chairperson: Bea Arellano
- Vice Chairperson: Estrelita Bagasbas
- Secretary-General: Mimi Doringo
- Affiliations: Bagong Alyansang Makabayan, International League of Peoples' Struggle (ILPS)
- Website: kadamay.org

The Kalipunan ng Damayang Mahihirap (lit. 'Association of Support of the Poor') or Kadamay is the largest association of urban poor organizations and advocates in the Philippines that advocates for their rights, as well as engages in local and national political issues that affect the urban poor sector.

Pamalakaya is affiliated with the Bagong Alyansang Makabayan (BAYAN), a coalition of progressive organizations. It has multiple chapters around the country, especially among urban poor communities.

== History ==
The organization was established on November 7, 1998, with Carmen "Ka Mameng" Deunida serving as its first chairperson.

== Advocacies ==
=== Urban poor issues ===
Leon Bolcan, chairperson of Kadamay in Davao City, in 2012, criticized the government of then-mayor Sara Duterte regarding the demolitions in the city. He said that the government officials “have one face to show to the world and another face they show to urban poor settlers whose houses are being demolished.” Kadamay said that ₱5000 compensation is barely enough. In 2011, Kadamay expressed concern on the plight of market vendors facing demolition regarding the "market modernization" on Barangay Sasa, Davao City.

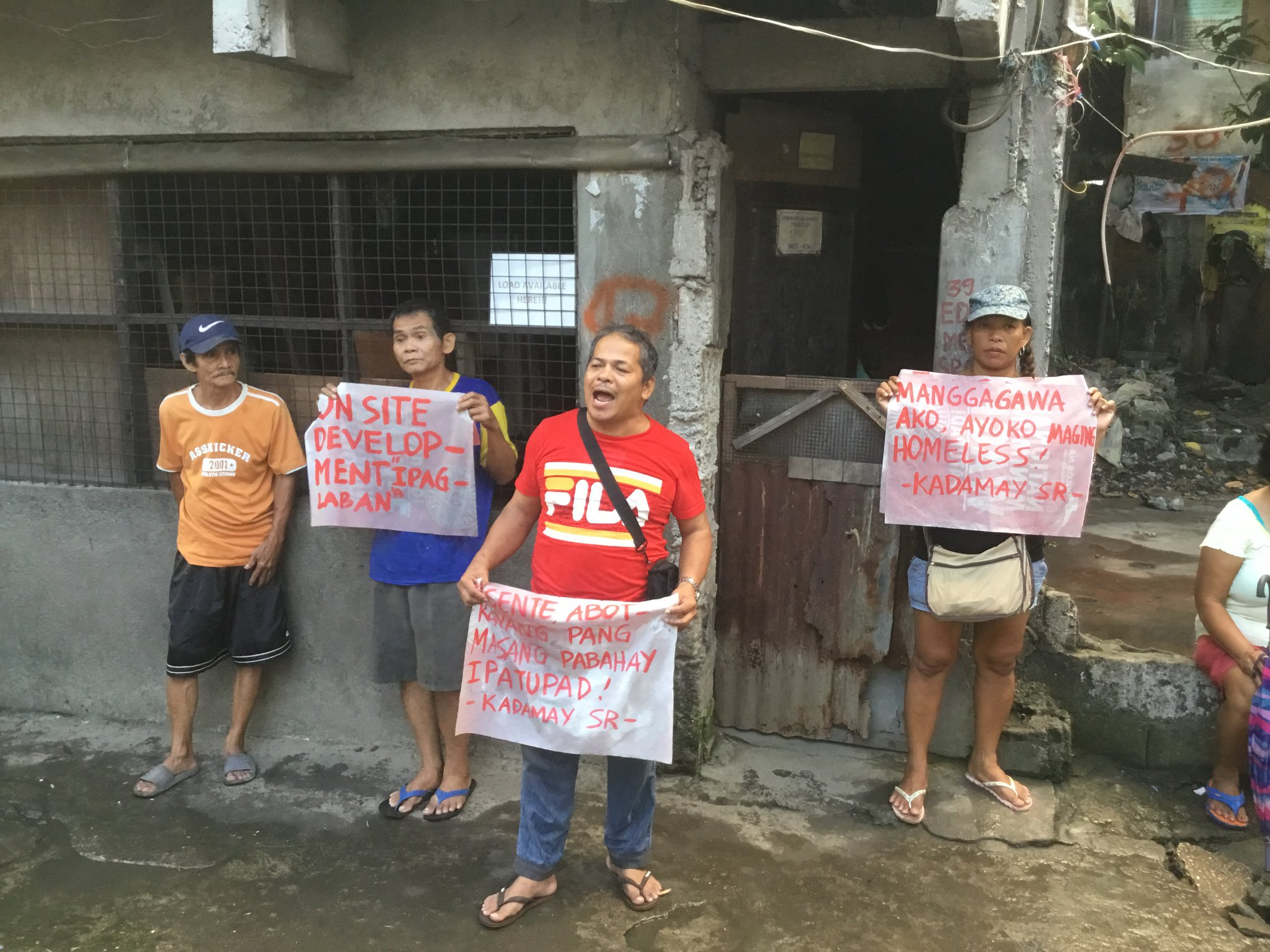
Protest inside Sitio San Roque, 2018.

Kadamay has been at the forefront of defending the urban poor community Sitio San Roque, West Triangle, Quezon City, being threatened by developments by Ayala Land. Kadamay Vice Chairperson Estrelita Bagasbas is a resident of the said urban poor community.

Kadamay has supported the plight of waste pickers trapped under the landfill in Rodriguez, Rizal.

==== Pandi idle housing project occuption ====
In 2017, Kadamay lead its members and other informal settlers the occupation of idle housing project of the National Housing Authority (Philippines) (NHA), in Pandi, Bulacan. Eventually, in 2019, Pandi Mayor Enrico Roque stated that giving legal status to Kadamay occupiers would bring economic benefits to the town of Pandi.

=== National issues ===
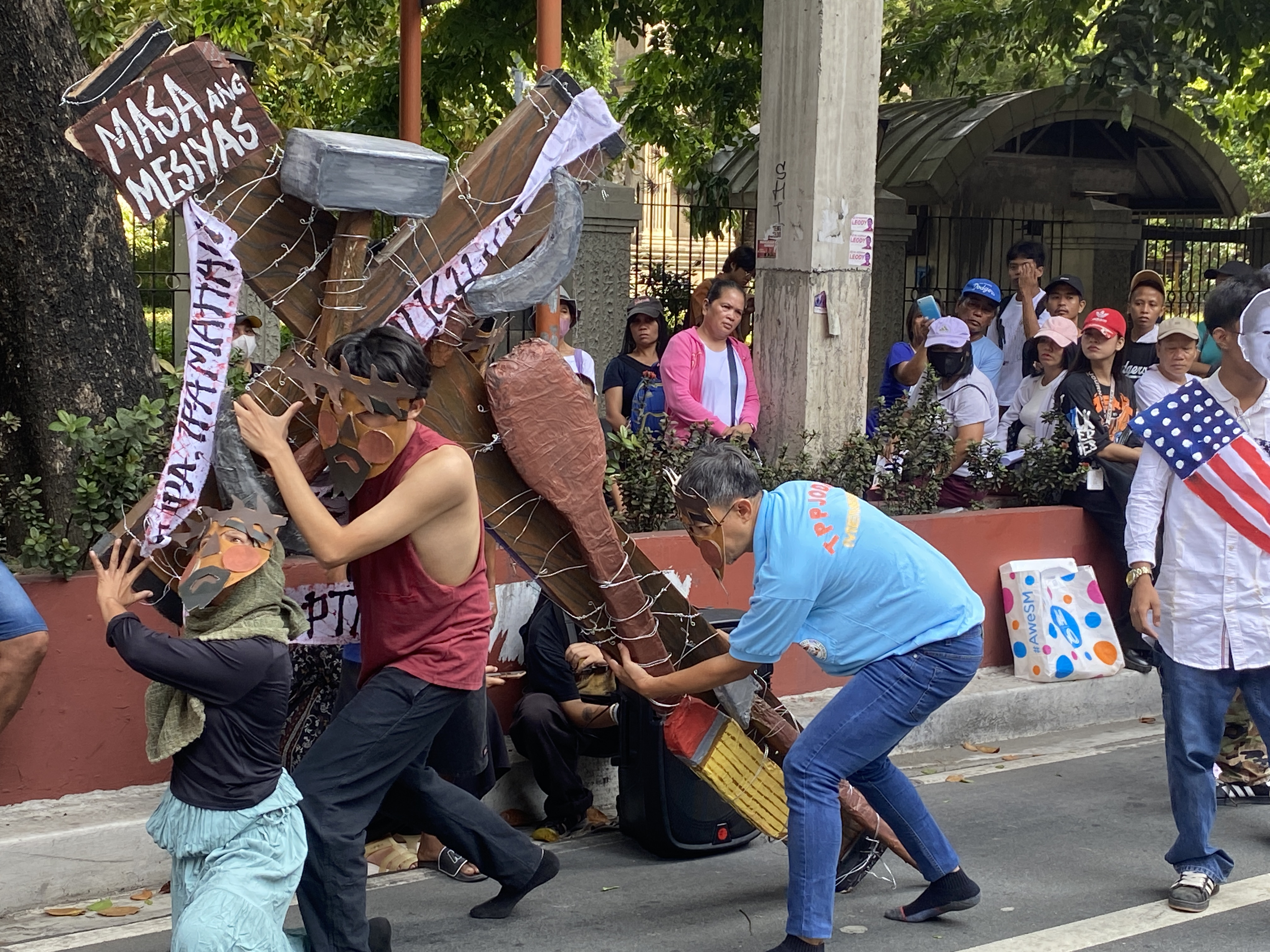
Kalbaryo ng Maralita, 2025.

Its first chairperson, Carmen "Ka Mameng" Deunida, an activist during the martial law era under President Ferdinand Marcos became a prominent figure during the EDSA People Power II that ousted President Erap Estrada from office.

On August 25, urban poor organization Kadamay held a rally to protest the drug-war killings, particularly the killing of 5-year-old Danica May Garcia.

Secretary-General Mimi Doringo ran for Senate during the 2025 Philippine national elections under the Makabayan Bloc. She vowed to impeach Vice President Sara Duterte if she were elected.

As part of the Philippine anti-corruption protests, Kadamay pointed out to President Bongbong Marcos, contractrs, as well as NHA, and the Department of Human Settlements and Urban Development as 'guilty' of corruption and resulting homelessness. They lead a led a Hukuman ng Maralita (Court of the Poor). On November 7, 2026, urban poor groups and members from Bayan Muna and Kadamay protested along Gregorio Araneta Avenue, Quezon City where there has been a flood-control project priced at ₱48 million, but they said did not work for residents of Brgy. Tatalon and was only painted red.

In Cebu, on October 17, a Black Friday Protest was launched in Cebu City against corruption and against 'weaponization' of law against those who protested at Region VII DPWH office on September 4, 2025. A subpoena violating Batas Pambansa 880 was previously issued against regional Cebuano leaders, including those belonging from Kadamay, because of 'damage' done by their throwing of tomatoes towards the office. The protesters held a banner "Prosecute the corrupt bureaucrat-capitalists, not the protesters.”
