= Raoul Manuel =

Filipino activist (born 1994)

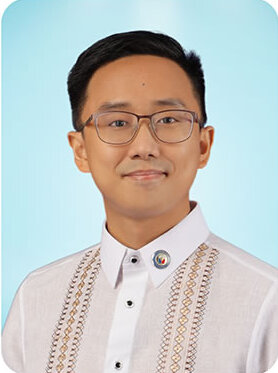
- Official portrait, 19th Congress

Member of the Philippine House of Representatives for Kabataan Partylist
- In office June 30, 2022 – June 30, 2025
- Preceded by: Sarah Elago
- Succeeded by: Renee Co
- Constituency: Partylist

34th Student Regent of the University of the Philippines
- In office 2016–2017

Personal details
- Born: Raoul Danniel Abellar Manuel; August 30, 1994 (age 32) Iloilo City, Philippines
- Party: Kabataan
- Other political affiliations: Makabayan
- Education: University of the Philippines Visayas (B.S.)
- Occupation: Student leader; Youth activist; Politician

Raoul Danniel Abellar Manuel (born August 30, 1994) is a Filipino youth activist and politician who served as the representative for Kabataan partylist from 2022 to 2025, of which he was also its national president. He also previously served as the president of the National Union of Students of the Philippines.

== Early life and education ==
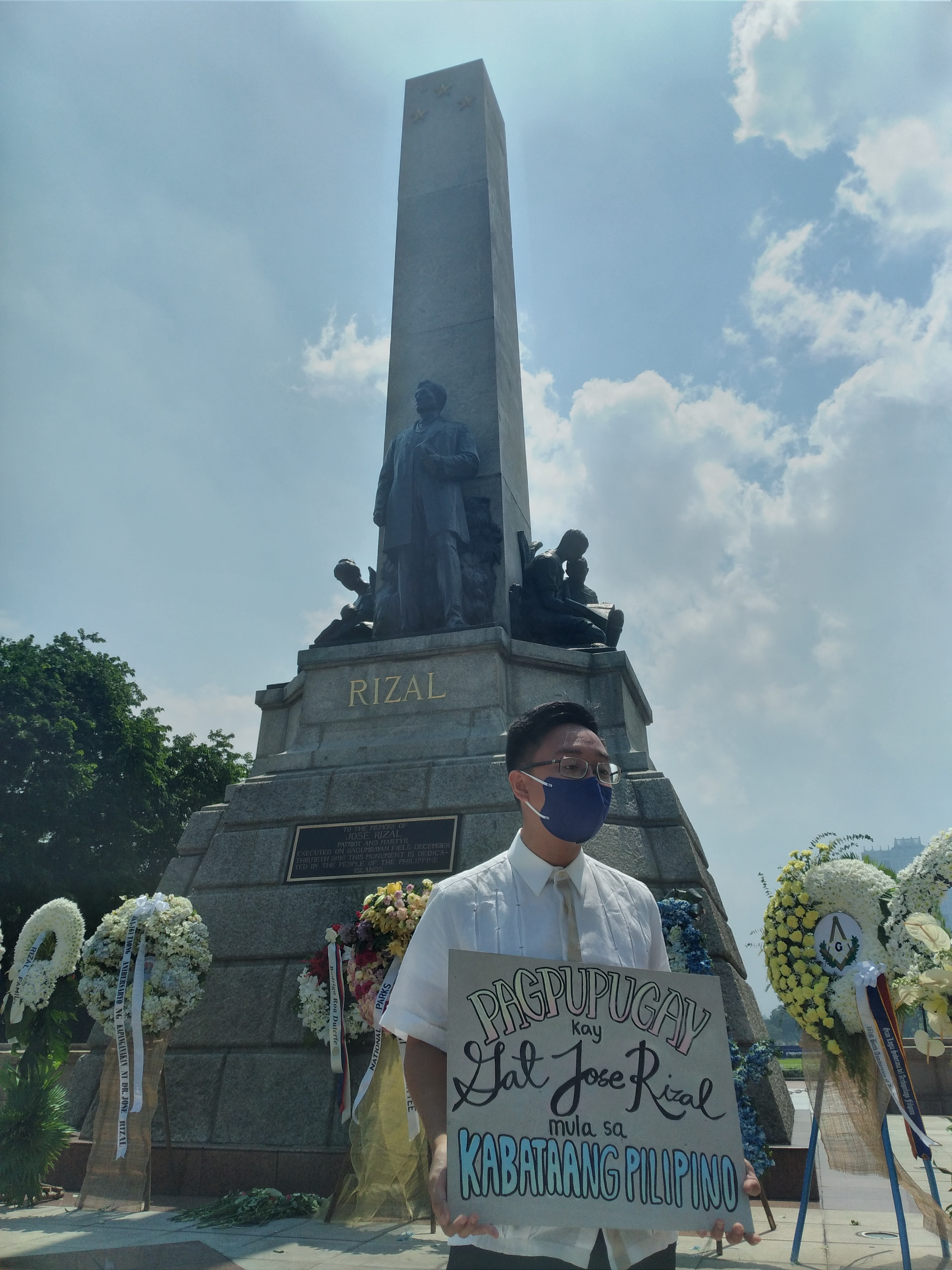
At the Rizal Monument, 2022

Manuel was born on August 30, 1994. The eldest of five children to Raul Manuel and Clarizel Joy Abellar, he grew up in Arevalo, Iloilo City. Their mother sold beauty products while their father was an Overseas Filipino Worker (OFW). For his elementary education, he attended SPED Integrated School for Exceptional Children, graduating in 2007 as the valedictorian, then proceeded to the University of the Philippines High School in Iloilo where he also graduated as valedictorian in 2011.

Manuel studied at the University of the Philippines Visayas (UPV) and graduated in 2015 with a Bachelor of Science degree in applied mathematics with a general weighted average (GWA) of 1.099, (Note: Most state universities and colleges in the Philippines follow the grade point system scale of 5.00 to 1.00, in which 1.00 is the highest possible grade and 5.00 is the lowest possible grade. see Academic grading in the Philippines.) making him the first summa cum laude in the university's history. During his time at UPV he led student protests and was also a cheerleader; during his senior year, he served as chairperson of the College of Arts and Sciences Student Council.

Afterwards, he served as national chairperson of Katipunan ng mga Sangguniang Mag-aaral sa UP (KASAMA sa UP), the alliance of student councils in the University of the Philippines (UP) system. While studying for his Master of Science degree in applied mathematics at UP Diliman, he served in academic year 2016–17 as the 34th UP Student Regent, the sole representative of the UP system's student body in the UP Board of Regents. He later served as national president of the National Union of Students of the Philippines (NUSP).

== Advocacies ==
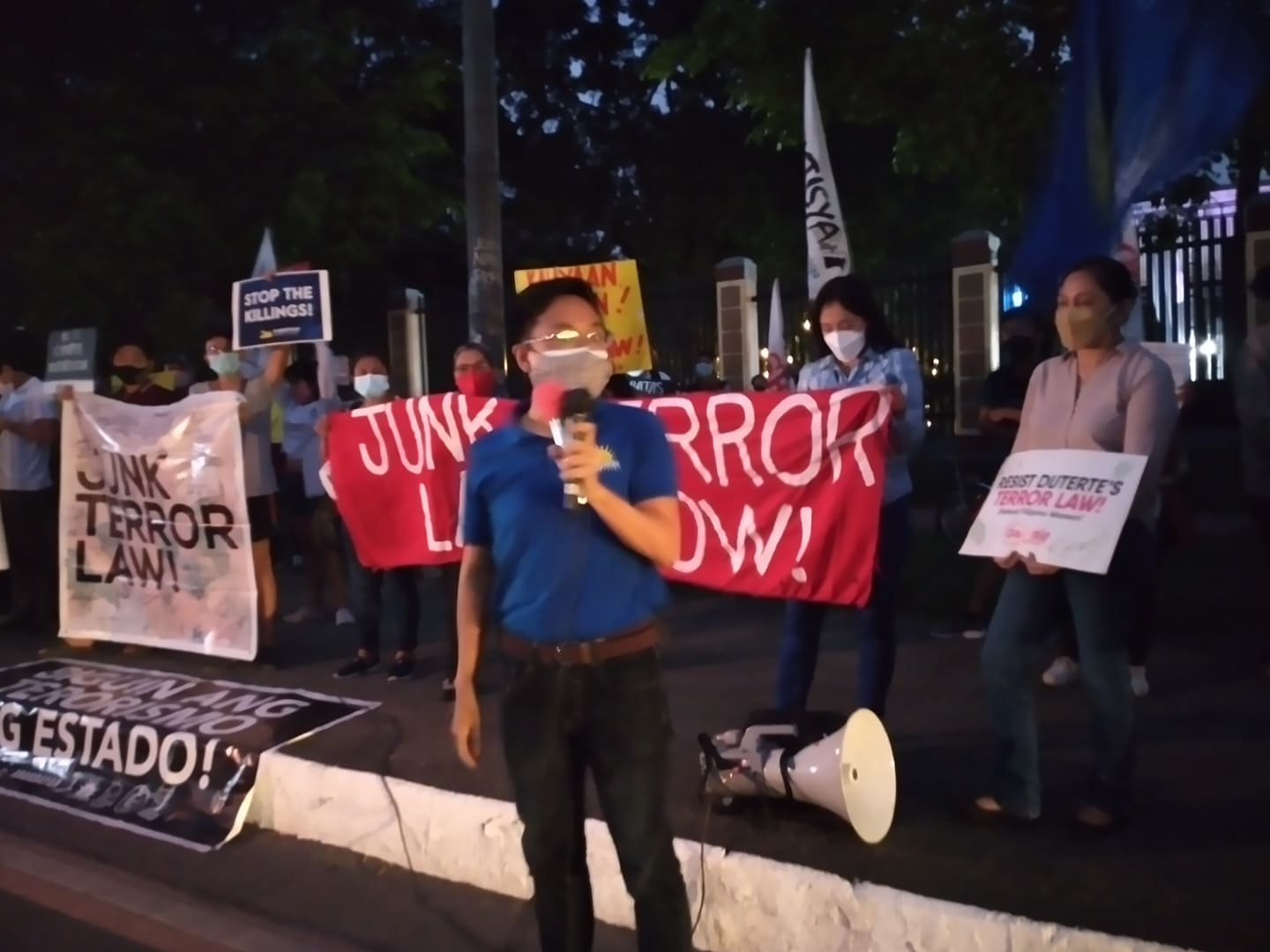
Raoul Manuel speaking against the Anti-Terrorism Act in a protest action, December 2021.

Raoul is an education and LGBTQ-plus advocate. He called for free education among public tertiary schools and the junking of the socialized tuition system in UP. He criticized the removal of Philippine History among senior high curriculums after housemates from Pinoy Big Brother failed to answer basic questions on Philippine history. He called for the review and overhaul of the K–12 system in the Philippines. He also criticized the state of education in the Philippines under the COVID-19 pandemic under the Duterte administration, saying that the shortcomings revealed the 'long-standing' problems of Philippine education. He became a National Convener for Rise for Education, an alliance that pushes through with nationalist, scientific, and mass-oriented Philippine education.

He has also been an advocate against mandatory implementation of Reserve Officers' Training Corps (ROTC) program in the Philippines as well as a critic of said alleged fabricated abuses under the Armed Forces of the Philippines. During a Senate hearing on ROTC on August 22, 2019, he had a heated exchange with Senator Ronald 'Bato' dela Rosa.

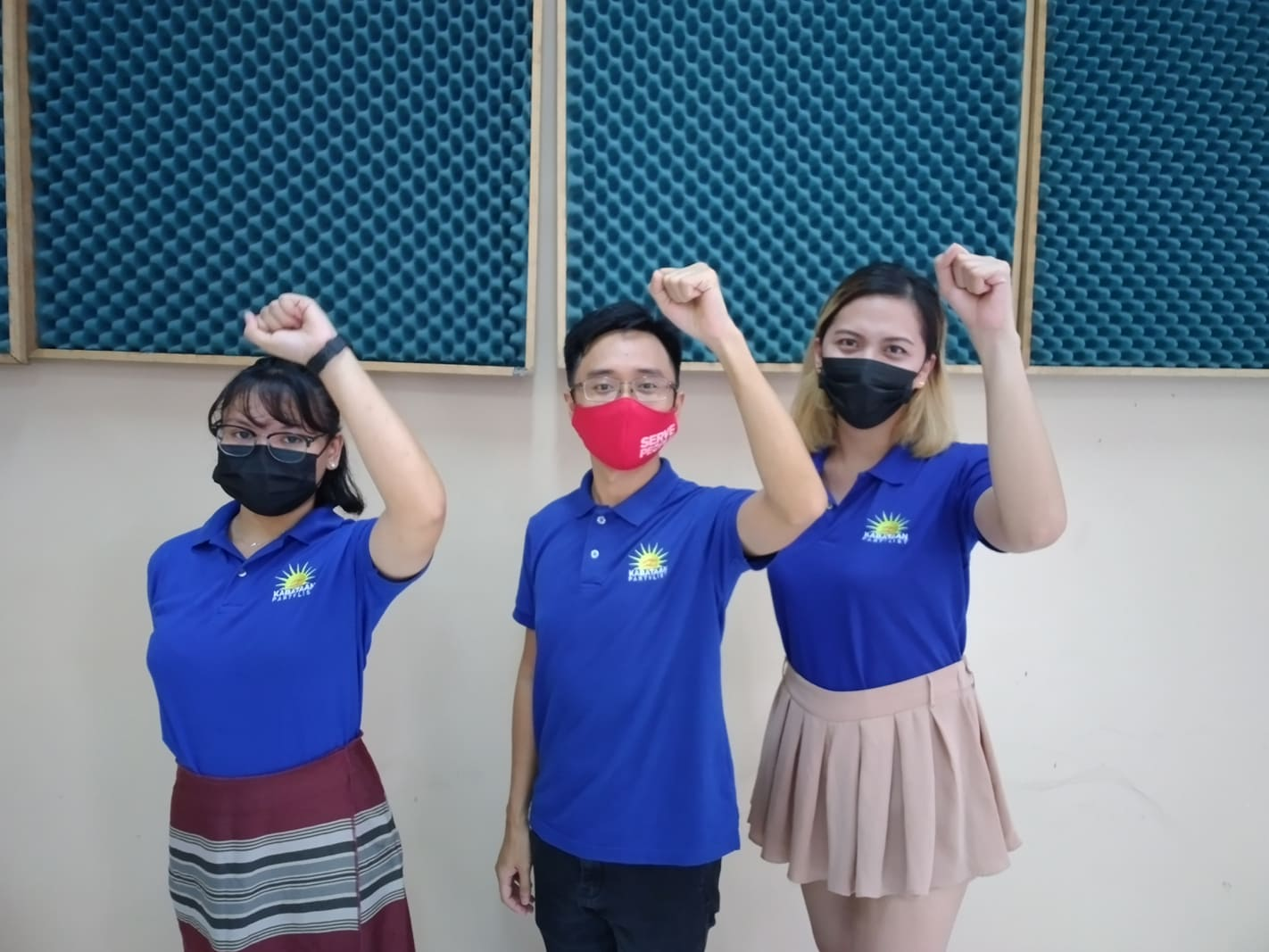
Kabataan Partylist nominees for 2022: Angelica Galimba (2nd nominee), Raoul Manuel, and Jandeil Roperos (3rd nominee).

During the filing for the nominees for the 2022 national elections, Manuel, as the first nominee of Kabataan Partylist, said that "The youth bear a responsibility to advance the politics of change and hope." He also said that Kabataan Partylist prevailed despite moves to disqualify them from Congress and denounced groups that "pretend" to be the voice of the youth.

In March 2022, a navy officer was condemned by Raoul in social media in which the said soldier posted death threats against the youth activist. The Philippine Navy said that the officer was relieved and became a subject of 'thorough investigation'.

He opposed both registrations of SIM cards and social media accounts.

== Political career ==
Entering congress at the age of 27, Manuel became one of the youngest members of the 19th Congress. He abstained during the election of the speakership and joined the minority bloc.

== Electoral history ==
Manuel was Kabataan's first nominee in the 2022 Philippine House of Representatives elections. The party-list received 536,690 votes or 1.46% of the votes, entitling the party a seat in congress. Throughout the campaign, the party was faced with disqualification cases, posing a risk to its proclamation. Nonetheless, the party was proclaimed as one of the winners of the party-list elections. Manuel, as the first nominee was designated as the party's representative in congress.
