= Stephen Paduano =

Filipino politician (born 1965)

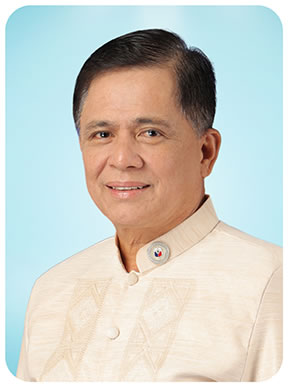
- Official portrait, 2022

Chair of the House Public Accounts Committee
- In office July 27, 2022 – June 30, 2025
- Preceded by: Jose Singson Jr.
- Succeeded by: Terry Ridon

House Minority Leader
- In office October 19, 2020 – June 30, 2022
- Preceded by: Bienvenido Abante
- Succeeded by: Marcelino Libanan

Member of the House of Representatives for Abang Lingkod
- In office May 28, 2014 – June 30, 2025
- Succeeded by: Manuel Frederick Ko

Personal details
- Born: Joseph Stephen Salupeza Paduano; January 22, 1965 (age 61) Saravia, Negros Occidental, Philippines
- Party: Abang Lingkod (partylist; 2012–present)
- Other political affiliations: Revolutionary Workers' Party (1995–2013); Communist Party of the Philippines (1982–1995)
- Occupation: Politician
- Rebel career
- Other name: Carapali Lualhalti
- Allegiance: Revolutionary Proletarian Army
- Service years: 1995–2013

Joseph Stephen Salupeza Paduano (born January 22, 1965), also known by his nom de guerre Carapali Lualhati, is a Filipino politician and previously the national commander of the Revolutionary Proletarian Army-Alex Boncayao Brigade (RPA-ABB), an armed communist revolutionary group. As a representative, he previously served as the House Minority Leader from 2020 to 2022. He served as the party-list representative for Abang Lingkod from 2014 to 2025.

== Early political activity ==
Paduano became a member of the Communist Party of the Philippines (CPP) in 1982 at the age of 17, which went against his aunt Haydee Yorac's wishes to send him to school; Yorac herself had experienced being a member of the Partido Komunista ng Pilipinas-1930 (PKP) in the 1960s.

== Revolutionary activity ==
He later became part of the Revolutionary Proletarian Army—Alex Boncayao Brigade (RPA-ABB), the military wing of the Revolutionary Workers' Party (RPM), a communist party that split from the CPP in 1995. Paduano went on to become its national commander with the nom de guerre of "Carapali Lualhalti." In December 1999, the RPA-ABB issued a statement signed by Paduano admitting the group's involvement in the assassination of former Philippine Constabulary officer Rolando Abadilla in 1996, and that the five men ("Abadilla 5") convicted of the crime were "mere fall guys" named by the police. On July 21, 2000, Paduano was mistakenly arrested for a few hours in Murcia, Negros Occidental by the military despite carrying a "safe-conduct" pass for his involvement in peace talks between rebels and the government; he was soon released upon the request of governor Rafael Coscolluela. By December 2000, the RPA-ABB under Paduano's command signed a peace pact with the government.

In May 2007, Paduano was expelled from the RPM alongside Veronica "Inca" Tabara and one other member by chairman Nilo de la Cruz for alleged abuses committed during the 2007 election in Negros island and corruption. Paduano then accused de la Cruz of covering up his own misdeeds by depicting them in a bad light as well as usurpation of power, claiming that only the party's congress could expel any of its members.

Paduano later disengaged from the RPA-ABB as he sought to participate in the 2013 elections as a party-list representative for Abang Lingkod, to which he was its first nominee.

== Political career ==
Despite his party-list winning more than 260,215 votes in the 2013 elections and earning them one seat in the House of Representatives, Paduano's group was disqualified by the Commission on Elections because it "didn't have a track record." However, on October 22, 2013, the Supreme Court reversed the election body's decision saying that the said party-list "need not prove track record." He was later sworn into office by then Speaker Feliciano Belmonte as the 290th member of the House of Representatives on May 28, 2014.

As the party-list's first nominee, Paduano continued to serve in the House of Representatives after his group was re-elected in the 2016 and 2019 elections.

In the 18th Congress, Paduano served as Deputy Minority Leader. Of all the representatives who hail from Negros Occidental, it was only Paduano who did not vote for Pateros–Taguig lone district representative Alan Peter Cayetano as Speaker in 2019 and instead, voted for Manila 6th district representative Bienvenido Abante as he was hoping to remain as Deputy Minority Leader. Abante was later elected as Minority Floor Leader.

He was a co-author to House Bill No. 3713, authored by Parañaque City 2nd district representative Joy Myra Tambunting, which sought to give a fresh 25-year franchise to ABS-CBN. During the 13th hearing on the network's franchise renewal on July 9, 2020, Paduano withdrew his co-authorship of the bill after concurring with the observations of Sagip party-list representative and Deputy Speaker Rodante Marcoleta that the network "has been funneling some of its income to Big Dipper" to "avoid paying taxes".

On October 19, 2020, he was unanimously elected to become the Minority Floor Leader after Abante's resignation on October 16, 2020. He is the first party-list representative to hold such a position.

On September 4, 2024, Paduano was designated by Speaker Martin Romualdez as caretaker representative of the 3rd district of Negros Occidental following the appointment of Jose Francisco Benitez as director general of the Technical Education and Skills Development Authority.

House of Representatives of the Philippines
Preceded by Bienvenido Abante	Minority Floor Leader of the House of Representatives of the Philippines; 2020–2022	Succeeded by Marcelino Libanan
