= Terry Ridon =

Filipino lawyer and politician (born 1986)

Terry L. Ridon
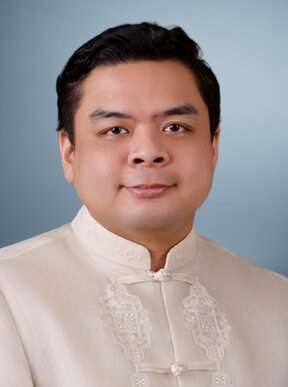
- Official portrait, 2026

Member of the Philippine House of Representatives for Bicol Saro
- Incumbent
- Assumed office June 30, 2025
- Preceded by: Brian Yamsuan

Chair of the House Public Accounts Committee
- Incumbent
- Assumed office July 30, 2025
- Preceded by: Stephen Paduano

Member of the Philippine House of Representatives for Kabataan
- In office June 30, 2013 – June 30, 2016
- Preceded by: Raymond Palatino
- Succeeded by: Sarah Elago

Chair and Chief Executive Officer of the Presidential Commission for the Urban Poor
- In office August 31, 2016 – December 12, 2017
- President: Rodrigo Duterte
- Succeeded by: Noel Felongco

Personal details
- Born: James Mark Terry Lacuanan Ridon; January 14, 1986 (age 40) Quezon City, Philippines
- Party: Bicol Saro (2024–present)
- Other political affiliations: Kabataan (2012–2016)
- Education: University of the Philippines Manila (B.A., Dev Studies); University of the Philippines Diliman (JD); Harvard Business School (GMP)
- Profession: Lawyer

James Mark Terry Lacuanan Ridon (born January 14, 1986) is a Filipino lawyer, broadcaster and politician who is serving as the representative of Bicol Saro Partylist in the Philippine House of Representatives since 2025. He previously represented Kabataan Partylist in the House of Representatives from 2013 to 2016 and served as the chairperson of the Presidential Commission for the Urban Poor (PCUP) under President Rodrigo Duterte from 2016 to 2017.

As broadcaster, Ridon hosted the DZMM radio news commentary programs Haybol Pinoy and ATM: Anong Take Mo? in between his terms in Congress.

== Early life and education ==
Ridon was born in Quezon City and studied at the University of the Philippines Manila, where he earned his Bachelor of Arts degree in Development Studies in 2006 and later completed his Juris Doctor degree from the University of the Philippines College of Law in 2011. In 2020, he completed Harvard Business School's General Management Program, a non-degree comprehensive leadership program for senior executives.

== Career ==
Ridon began his involvement in governance as the Student Regent of the University of the Philippines Board of Regents from 2007 to 2008. He subsequently served as National Campaign and Media Officer of the Kabataan from 2008 to 2010 and was elected National President from 2010 to 2013.

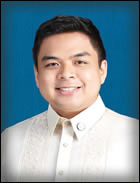
Ridon official portrait during the 16th Congress

In 2013, Ridon was elected as the representative of Kabataan in the 16th Congress of the Philippines, serving until 2016. During his tenure in Congress, he authored and supported measures on education, youth empowerment, and social justice.

From August 2016 to December 2017, he served as Chairperson and Chief Executive Officer of the Presidential Commission for the Urban Poor (PCUP) under the administration of President Rodrigo Duterte. In December 2017, Ridon and the other commissioners of the PCUP were dismissed over allegations of excessive foreign trips and failure to convene regular meetings. Ridon maintained that all trips were official and authorized by Malacañang.

Following his government service, Ridon became active in policy research and media. He founded and led the public policy think tank InfraWatch PH from 2018 to 2025 and concurrently served as principal of Ridon, a private consultancy. He was also involved in media work, anchoring on DZMM Radyo Patrol 630 and DZMM TeleRadyo from 2018 to 2019 and hosting the public affairs program ATM: Anong Take Mo? on Radyo 630 and TeleRadyo Serbisyo from 2023 to 2025.

In June 2025, Ridon returned to the House of Representatives as the representative of Bicol Saro Party-list in the 20th Congress of the Philippines.

On July 30, 2025, Ridon was elected Chairperson of the Philippine House Committee on Public Accounts, which deals with matters directly and principally relating to the examination and scrutiny of audit reports on the performance of all government agencies to determine their adherence to or compliance with the plans and programs authorized through appropriations approved by the legislature.

He is also the presiding chairperson of the House Infrastructure Committee, a multi-committee panel which was formed by the 20th Congress on August 21, 2025 to investigate matters related to national infrastructure, such as public works and flood control programs.

== Electoral history ==
Electoral history of Terry Ridon
Year	Office	Party	Votes received				Result
Year	Office	Party	Total	%	P.	Swing	Result
2013	Representative (Party-list)	Kabataan	341,292	1.24%	29th	—N/a	Won
2025	Representative (Party-list)	Bicol Saro	366,177	0.87%	10th	—N/a	Won

Political offices
House of Representatives of the Philippines
Preceded by Raymond Palatino	Member of the Philippine House of Representatives from Kabataan; 2013–2016	Succeeded by Sarah Elago
Preceded by Brian Yamsuan	Member of the Philippine House of Representatives from Bicol Saro; 2025–present	Incumbent
