= Impeachment of Sara Duterte =

The impeachment of Sara Duterte may refer to:

- First impeachment of Sara Duterte, the February 2025 impeachment in the House of Representatives
- Second impeachment of Sara Duterte, the May 2026 impeachment in the House of Representatives
  - Impeachment trial of Sara Duterte
