= Gabriela Women's Party =

GABRIELA Women's Party
- Leader: Liza Maza
- Spokesperson: Luzviminda Ilagan
- Founded: 1984, 2003 (as partylist)
- Headquarters: Quezon City
- Ideology: Socialist feminism National democracy Marxism-Leninism-Maoism; Communism; Anti-imperialism
- Political position: Far-left
- National affiliation: Bayan; Makabayan
- International affiliation: International League of Peoples' Struggle
- Colors: Purple, White
- Slogan: Babae, bata, bayan... tuloy ang laban! ('Women, children, [and the] nation... the fight continues!')
- Seats in the House of Representatives of the Philippines: 1 / 317
- House of Representatives party-list seats: 1 / 63

The Gabriela Women's Party (General Assembly Binding Women for Reform, Integrity, Equality, Leadership and Action), or simply GABRIELA, is a national democratic Filipino political party that advocates for women's issues and represents Filipino women in the House of Representatives.

The party is separate, although allied, with GABRIELA National Alliance of Filipino Women. GABRIELA, the alliance, is a nationwide network of grassroots organizations, institutions, and programs that address social issues such as human rights, poverty, globalization, militarism, violence, rape culture, health, sex trafficking, censorship and other issues affecting women. The alliance has regional chapters in Metro Manila, Cordillera Administrative Region, and Mindanao; sub-regional chapters in Negros, Panay and Samar, and provincial chapters in Bicol and Cebu. GABRIELA's membership includes Filipino women from marginalized sectors of society and works towards their education and empowerment. The organization also engages in counseling services, medical missions, free clinics, and trainings on women's health and women's rights.

== History ==
GABRIELA, the alliance, was founded in April 1984 after 10,000 women marched in Manila, defying a Marcos decree against demonstrations. GABRIELA was named in honor of Gabriela Silang, a Filipina revolutionary, who led a revolt against Spain in 1763 following her husband's assassination. Amidst a backdrop of widespread social inequality and unrest, GABRIELA aimed to synthesize issues of national liberation, poverty and women's emancipation. The organization's founders pushed for "Third World feminism" which focused on comprehensive social transformation, rather than focusing on individual forms of oppression. GABRIELA's advocacy challenges patriarchy, alongside resisting foreign influence and neocolonialism.

In October 2024, GABRIELA fielded former Kabataan Partylist Representative Sarah Elago as their lead representative for the 2025 House sectoral elections, with pushing the legalization of abortion in the country, and did not agree with the term usage of sex workers to prostitutes.

== Electoral performance ==
In 2003, the Gabriela Women's Party was launched with the help of GABRIELA members and other women's and people's organizations. In the 2004 election for the House of Representatives the party-list received 464,586 votes (3.6518% of the nationwide vote) and won a seat for first nominee Liza Maza. In the 2007 election, the party won two seats in the nationwide party-list vote. The Gabriela Women's Party was the only women's party to obtain a second term in Congress. On September 14, 2025, COMELEC chairperson George Garcia announced Gabriela Women's Party's Sarah Elago proclaimed as the 64th winning party-list representative on September 17, 2025 after Duterte Youth party-list disqualified.

Election	Votes	%	Seats
2004	464,586	3.65%	1
2007	621,171	3.89%	2
2010	1,001,421	3.31%	2
2013	713,492	2.60%	2
2016	1,367,795	4.22%	2
2019	445,696	1.61%	1
2022	413,909	1.15%	1
2025	256,811	0.61%	1 (Note: Party-list proclaimed after the COMELEC Resolution allotting one more Party-list representation in Congress)

=== Representatives to Congress ===
- 13th Congress (2004–2007) - Liza Maza
- 14th Congress (2007–2010) - Luzviminda Ilagan, Liza Maza
- 15th Congress (2010–2013) - Luzviminda Ilagan, Emerenciana de Jesus
- 16th Congress (2013–2016) - Luzviminda Ilagan, Emerenciana de Jesus
- 17th Congress (2016–2019) - Emerenciana de Jesus, Arlene Brosas
- 18th Congress (2019–2022) - Arlene Brosas
- 19th Congress (2022–2025) - Arlene Brosas
- 20th Congress (2025–present) - Sarah Elago

== Programs and positions ==
=== One Billion Rising (OBR) Task Force Philippines ===
One Billion Rising (OBR) is a global campaign founded to end rape and sexual violence against women. Since 2013, GABRIELA have led the One Billion Rising Task Force in the Philippines and abroad where its chapters are situated.

The Philippine task force members include:

- Gabriela
- Gabriela Women's Party
- Gabriela Youth
- Kilusang Mayo Uno
- Alliance of Concerned Teachers
- Ecumenical Women's Forum
- Salinlahi Alliance for Children's Concerns
- Association for the Rights of Children in Southeast Asia
- Amihan Federation of Peasant Women
- Kadamay
- Innabuyog Gabriela
- Kabataan Partylist
- Migrante

=== Human trafficking ===
In the Philippines, GABRIELA is actively involved in awareness campaigns to prevent the trafficking of women and girls from the Philippines. Its strategies consist of seminars and information dissemination to NGOs and government agencies and awareness campaigns at the community level. In 1999, GABRIELA launched the Purple Rose Campaign against the sex trafficking of Filipino women and children. The campaign achieved a milestone with the passage of the Anti-Trafficking in Persons Act of 2003 with GABRIELA representative Liza Maza as the bill's co-sponsor. GABRIELA is also actively involved in the Vow to Fight Against Violence on Women and the Free Our Sisters/Free Ourselves campaign.

=== International chapters ===
GABRIELA has chapters in the United States, the Netherlands, Japan, Hong Kong, Taiwan, Italy, Germany and the United Kingdom.

== See also ==
- Abanse! Pinay
- Violeta Marasigan
