= Sarah Elago =

Filipino politician (born 1989)

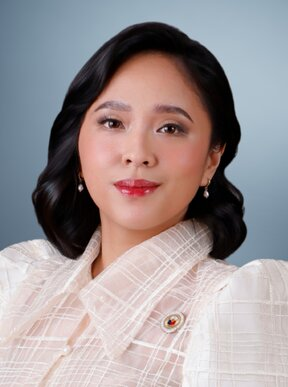
- Official portrait, 2026

Member of the Philippine House of Representatives for Gabriela
- Incumbent
- Assumed office September 23, 2025

Assistant Minority Floor Leader
- Incumbent
- Assumed office September 23, 2025
- Leader: Marcelino Libanan

Member of the Philippine House of Representatives for Kabataan
- In office June 30, 2016 – June 30, 2022

Personal details
- Born: Sarah Jane Ibañez Elago; October 18, 1989 (age 37) Las Piñas, Philippines
- Party: Gabriela (since 2024); Makabayan (since 2016)
- Other political affiliations: Kabataan (until 2024)
- Education: University of the Philippines Diliman (BS HRIM)

Sarah Jane Ibañez Elago (born October 18, 1989) is a Filipino activist and politician who has served as the representative for Gabriela Women's Party since 2025. A longtime member of Makabayan, she previously served as the Kabataan Party-list from 2016 to 2022, during which she was the youngest female member of the House of Representatives.

A graduate of the University of the Philippines Diliman, Elago served as the national president of the National Union of Students in the Philippines and was active in student activism. During her congressional tenure, she sat as a member of the House minority bloc and supported the franchise renewal for the broadcast network ABS-CBN.

After leaving Congress, Elago remained active in the Makabayan Coalition and was among those who filed the second impeachment complaint against Vice President Sara Duterte. In 2025, she unsuccessfully sought a return to the House of Representatives as the first nominee of Gabriela, which lost its sole seat in the lower chamber. After the registration of Duterte Youth was revoked in June 2025, COMELEC announced that Gabriela would regain its Congress seat.

== Early life and education ==
Elago was born on October 18, 1989, in Las Piñas. As a child, she stuttered and found it difficult to speak to others. She learned to manage the disability by joining drama clubs, singing, and reading out loud. She finished high school at Parañaque Science High School. She would eventually study at the University of the Philippines Diliman, graduating cum laude with a degree in Bachelor of Science in Hotel, Restaurant, and Institution Management.

While in UP, she was a member of The UP Repertory Company (UP Rep), UP Kontemporaryong Gamelan Pilipino (lit. 'UP Filipino Contemporary Gamelan'), a theater arts performing group, and a student councilor for two years. Elago was also involved in youth sectoral politics and activism, becoming a coordinator for Youth Vote Philippines and Rock the Vote Philippines, an officer in the International Youth Council, and a member of the Asia Pacific Conference on Reproductive and Sexual Health and Rights - National Youth Committee in 2013. She was also the national president of the National Union of Students of the Philippines, and a national convenor for the Rise for Education Alliance and Youth for Accountability and Truth Now.

== House of Representatives (2016–2022) ==
=== Elections ===
In her campaign for Kabataan Party-list in 2016, Elago campaigned for the advancement of a "youth agenda", as well as for free education, free internet access, and gender equality. She was re-elected in 2019.

=== Tenure ===
During her tenure, Elago served as a member of the minority for 12 House committees, including Youth and Sports Development, Women and Gender Equality, and Higher and Technical Education.

During the School Strike for Climate in May 2019, Elago joined youth protesters calling for a rejection of government proposals that could have detrimental effects on the environment.

Elago supported the franchise renewal for broadcast network ABS-CBN. She was also among the representatives who opposed a bill allowing full foreign ownership in power, transport, and communications sectors in the Philippines.

== Post-congressional career ==
On December 4, 2024, Elago and 74 others filed the second impeachment complaint against Vice President Sara Duterte, submitting one article of impeachment: betrayal of public trust.

== House of Representatives (since 2025) ==
=== Election ===
On October 4, 2024, the Gabriela Women's Party filed its certification of nomination and acceptance for the 2025 election, which listed Elago as its first nominee, followed by Cathy Estabillo and Jean Lindo. The party pursued a progressive platform of enshrining gender equality and rights for the LGBTQ+ community, expressing support for the SOGIE Equality Bill and divorce legislation. During the campaign, Elago spoke in favor of decriminalizing abortion in the Philippines and including transgender women in Women's History Month celebrations.

On March 26, 2025, her party filed a complaint against the National Task Force to End Local Communist Armed Conflict (NTF-ELCAC) before the Commission on Elections (COMELEC), citing incidents of red-tagging and gender-based sexual harassment from the task force. Jonathan Malaya, the head of the National Security Council, derided the complaint, defending the NTF-ELCAC and insisting that "former rebels" are responsible for the incidents.

In the 2025 House of Representatives elections, Gabriela initially did not win a seat, leaving the organization without representation for the first time since its founding as a party-list in 2003. They received 0.61% of the vote, placing 55th and nearly halving their vote share from 2022. Following the election, the party urged the COMELEC to conduct a manual recount, citing discrepancies in vote counting.

Despite their loss, media outlets observed that with Gabriela's vote share, it was still possible for Gabriela to obtain a seat upon the disqualification of a winning party-list. Following the election, the proclamation of two winning party-lists—Duterte Youth and Bagong Henerasyon (BH)—was suspended due to ongoing cases against them. The latter's case was dismissed on June 1, while the registration of the former was cancelled on June 18. In response to the initial ruling on Duterte Youth, Gabriela urged the COMELEC to expedite their case and proclaim them as a winning party as soon as possible. On September 14, 2025, COMELEC chairperson George Garcia announced that the electoral body proclaimed Elago as the 64th winning party-list representative in response to the vacancies on September 17, 2025. She was sworn in on September 23, 2025.

=== Tenure ===
In November 2025, House Deputy Minority Leader Antonio Tinio, House Assistant Minority Leader Renee Co (Kabataan party-list), and Elago filed House Resolution 515 calling for a legislative probe on Bongbong Marcos, Sandro Marcos, former Executive Secretary Lucas Bersamin, and other high-ranking officials who have been linked to corruption relating to the flood control projects scandal in the Philippines.

On January 26, 2026, Makabayan bloc members by Antonio Tinio, Renee Co, and Sarah Elago endorsed an impeachment complaint against President Bongbong Marcos.

On February 2, 2026, Makabayan bloc members by Tinio, Co, and Elago endorsed an impeachment complaint against Vice President Sara Duterte.

== Public profile ==
Elago was the youngest female member of the House of Representatives during her tenure, having served from the ages of 26 to 33. Besides being the youngest lawmaker, she is also the poorest lawmaker with a net worth of ₱85,400 based on her 2018 Statement of Assets, Liabilities, and Net Worth (SALN). She was also the poorest in 2017 with a net worth of ₱75,800.

== Personal life ==
Elago is the founding president of the Philippine Stuttering Association, an advocacy group that supports people who stutter. She has also supported breast cancer patients and survivors by donating her hair.

== Electoral history ==
Electoral history of Sarah Elago
Year	Office	Party	Votes received				Result
Year	Office	Party	Total	%	P.	Swing	Result
2016	Representative (Party-list)	Kabataan	300,420	0.93%	35th	—N/a	Won
2019	Representative (Party-list)	Kabataan	195,837	0.70%	45th	-0.23	Won
2025	Representative (Party-list)	Gabriela	256,811	0.61%	55th	—N/a	Won (Note: Party-list proclaimed after the registration of Duterte Youth was declared void ab initio, leaving three seats vacant, one of which was filled by the party.)

== Notes ==
Political offices
House of Representatives of the Philippines
Preceded by Terry Ridon	Member of the Philippine House of Representatives from Kabataan; 2016–2022	Succeeded by Raoul Manuel
Preceded by Arlene Brosas	Member of the Philippine House of Representatives from Gabriela; 2025–present	Incumbent
