= Bicol Saro =

Political party in Philippines

- — Philippine partylist —
- Full name: Bicol Saro Partylist
- Colors: Blue, Red

Current representation (20th Congress)
- Seats in the House of Representatives: 1 / 3 (Out of 63 party-list seats)
- Representative(s): Terry Ridon

Bicol Saro (transl. One Bicol) is a political party in the Philippines. Based in the Bicol Region, it is currently an organization with party-list representation in the House of Representatives of the Philippines.

== History ==
Bicol Saro is among the parties that vied for a seat in the Interim Batasang Pambansa in the 1978 parliamentary election.

In 2019, Bicol Saro entered into a partnership with the Hugpong ng Pagbabago (HNP) party.

It later ran as a party-list organization. It won a seat in the House of Representatives' 19th Congress in the 2022 elections. Their campaign was aided by an endorsement from actress Nora Aunor.

The seat is filled by Nicolas Enciso VIII, who was previously a nominee for the 1-Pacman Party List and a former deputy-director general of the Technical Education and Skills Development Authority.

== Electoral results ==
=== Senate ===
Year	Votes	%	Seats won	Seats after	Results
1995	527,612	0.29	0 / 12	0 / 24	Lost

=== Batasang Pambansa/House of Representatives ===
==== Parliamentary district elections ====
Year	Votes	%	Seats	Results
1978	2,105,599	1.01	0 / 190	Lost
1984	83,656	0.14	0 / 200	Lost

==== Party-list elections ====
Year	Votes	%	Seats	Results
2022	325,371	0.88	1 / 63	Majority
2025	366,177	0.87	1 / 63	Minority

== Representatives to Congress ==
Period	Representative
19th Congress; 2022–2025	Brian Yamsuan
20th Congress; 2025–present	Terry Ridon
Note: A party-list group, can win a maximum of three seats in the House of Representatives.
