= Arlene Brosas =

Filipina educator, activist and politician

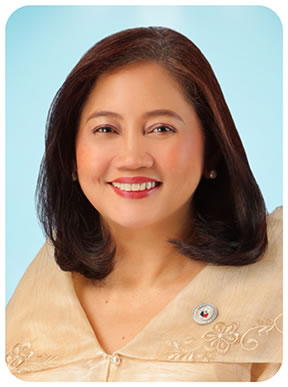
- Official portrait, 2022

Member of the Philippine House of Representatives for Gabriela Women’s Party-list
- In office June 30, 2016 – June 30, 2025
- Preceded by: Emerenciana de Jesus
- Succeeded by: Sarah Elago

Minority Leader of the House Committee on Women and Gender Equality
- In office July 22, 2019 – June 30, 2025
- Chairperson: Geraldine Roman

Personal details
- Born: Arlene Duran Brosas; October 30, 1975 (age 51) Quezon City, Philippines
- Party: Makabayan (2015–present); Gabriela (partylist; 2015–present)
- Education: University of the Philippines Diliman (BA)

Arlene Duran Brosas (born October 30, 1975) is a Filipina educator, child rights activist, and politician. She served as a member of the House of Representatives under the Gabriela Women's Party-list group from 2016 to 2025.

In Congress, she filed the anti-endo bill that sought to give workers security of tenure. She is also one of the co-authors of the Sexual Orientation and Gender Identity Expression (SOGIE) Equality Bill.

She was the spokesperson for the Anti-Child Pornography Alliance and spokesperson and co-convenor for the Save Nena campaign to stop child prostitution. She was also executive director of Akap sa Bata ng mga Guro Kalinga, a nationwide alliance of volunteer day-care teachers, and secretary general of the Akap Bata Party-list.

She was also a member of the 17th Congress where Gabriela received the second highest number of votes among party-list groups.

== Early life and education ==
Brosas comes from a poor family in Quezon City. She is third child in a brood of five. Her mother comes from a family of fishers and her father was a peasant.

She took up Bachelor of Arts degree in Philippine Studies at the University of the Philippines (U.P.) Diliman and went on to teach Philippine Literature, Humanities, and Science, Technology and Society at U.P. Baguio and U.P. Manila.

== 18th Congress ==
Brosas was a member of the Philippine House of Representatives for the 18th Congress under the Gabriela Women's Party-list group, during which she served as assistant minority leader.

Brosas is one of the co-authors of the SOGIE Equality Bill, which aims to prevent discrimination based on sexual orientation.

She co-authored the anti-endo bill that sought to give workers security of tenure by the ending the practice of endo or labor contractualization.

She filed the Rice Industry Development Act, which aims to support Filipino farmers and identify rice zones to boost rice production in the country.

She also filed in the 18th Congress a Magna Carta for Daycare Workers, Amendments to the Solo Parents Welfare Act, Amendments to the Anti-Rape Law, and Electronic Violence Against Women and Children.

She also supports the franchise renewal for broadcast company ABS-CBN.

In 2020, Brosas joined fellow lawmakers in protesting the passage of House Bill number 6875, also known as the anti-terror bill.

In 2021, she opposed Resolution of Both Houses No. 2 that aims to amend economic provisions of the 1987 Constitution on foreign ownership of key industries.

Brosas supports climate justice and the protection of human rights.

== 19th Congress ==
In 2022, Brosas was appointed as an assistant minority leader in the 19th Congress.

== Electoral history ==
Electoral history of Arlene Brosas
Year	Office	Party	Votes received				Result
Year	Office	Party	Total	%	P.	Swing	Result
2016	Representative (Party-list)	Gabriela	1,367,795	4.22%	2nd	—N/a	Won
2019	Representative (Party-list)	Gabriela	445,696	1.61%	12th	-2.61	Won
2022	Representative (Party-list)	Gabriela	413,909	1.15%	21st	-0.46	Won
2025	Senator of the Philippines	Makabayan	4,343,773	7.57%	33rd	—N/a	Lost
