= Kabataan =

Philippine party list affiliated with Makabayan

- — Philippine partylist —
- Full name: Ang Nagkakaisang Kabataan Para sa Sambayanan
- Abbreviation: Kabataan; Anak ng Bayan
- President: Julius Cantiga
- Secretary general: Jolo Labio
- Sector(s) represented: Youth
- Founded: June 19, 2001; 25 years ago
- Ideology: National democracy
- Political position: Far-left
- National affiliation: Bayan; Makabayan
- Colors: Blue, Yellow

Current representation (20th Congress)
- Seats in the House of Representatives: 1 / 3 (Out of 63 party-list seats)
- Representative(s): Renee Co

Website
- kabataanpartylist.com.ph

Kabataan, also known as the Kabataan Partylist (KPL, lit. 'Youth Partylist') and formerly known as Ang Nagkakaisang Kabataan Para sa Sambayanan (ANAK ng BAYAN, lit. 'The United Youth for the People'), is a partylist in the Philippines affiliated with the far-left political coalition Makabayan. It is currently represented by Renee Co at the Philippine Congress since 2025. According to its website, the partylist represents the youth sector, and aims to "galvanize the Filipino youth’s unity for social change," believing that the youth should "devote its intellect, energy, and courage to building a new society devoid of corruption, inequality, and social injustice."

The partylist was first formed in 2001 in the aftermath of the Second EDSA Revolution, and vied for a seat in the Congress in the 2004 elections, where they failed to secure a single seat. However, they managed to secure a single seat in the succeeding elections since then.

== History ==
=== Formation ===
The origins of Kabataan can be traced back to the youth group Estrada Resign Youth Movement (ERYM), a group prominently active during the Second EDSA Revolution in 2001. It then renamed itself as the Youth Movement for Justice and Meaningful Change (YMJC) during the Arroyo administration.

In May 2001, YMJC met with the leaders of Anakbayan, the League of Filipino Students, the College Editors Guild of the Philippines, the National Union of Students of the Philippines, and the Student Christian Movement of the Philippines in Sampaloc, Manila to discuss methods to advance youth interests in the country. The convening groups eventually resolved to create a youth party, creating the Ang Nagkakaisang Kabataan Para sa Sambayanan (ANAK ng BAYAN, lit. 'The United Youth For the People'). On June 19, 25 representatives from involved groups and Kabataan Artista Para sa Tunay na Kalayaan (KARATULA, lit. 'Youth Artists For True Freedom') formally inaugurated ANAK ng BAYAN at the University of the Philippines Diliman. The date was chosen to coincide with the 140th birth anniversary of national hero José Rizal.

=== Arroyo administration (2004-2010) ===
The partylist had members from nine regions of the country by 2002, and by 2004, decided to run for representation for the 2004 elections. The group fielded Apolinario Alvarez, Eric Jude Casilao, and Ronalyn Olea for the elections; however, they failed to win a single seat due to red-tagging allegations against the group.

In 2005, ANAK ng BAYAN renamed itself as the Kabataan Partylist, in order to avoid confusion with similar names such as Anakbayan and the political party Akbayan. Kabataan ran again for representation at the 2007 elections, securing 228,000 votes. However, this is below the 2% of the total partylist votes requirement for partylist representation. A 2009 Supreme Court ruling changed the partylist law, thus allowing Kabataan (among other groups) to field its first representative to the Congress, Raymond Palatino.

Kabataan became a convening member of the left-leaning bloc Makabayang Koalisyon ng Mamamayan (Makabayan, lit. 'Patriotic Coalition of the People') in 2009.

Kabataan filed House Bill 6799, "Anti-No-Permit, No-Exam Policy" bill in Congress. The Commission on Higher Education issued Memorandum Order 02 Series of 2010 banning the "no permit, no exam" policy in response to the Kabataan bill.

=== Aquino III administration (2010-2016) ===
The group decided to run at the 2010 elections, fielding three nominees led by incumbent representative Palatino. The group successfully sued the Commission on Elections (COMELEC) for ending the voter registration prematurely for the forthcoming elections, and sued a police superintendent for assaulting one of their nominee. The 2010 elections resulted in a single seat for the group, with Palatino extending his term for another three years.

In the 2013 elections, Kabataan fielded three nominees led by Terry Ridon. COMELEC threatened to disqualify the group due to campaign-related violations, a move seen by the group as being orchestrated by the Aquino III administration in an attempt to "push out progressive partylists". Kabataan successfully secured another seat again, with Ridon replacing Palatino as the representative of the partylist.

In 2015, Ridon filed H.R. No. 2135, the first bill in the House of Representatives pushing for universal tuition-free education in state universities and colleges.

=== Duterte administration (2016-2022) ===
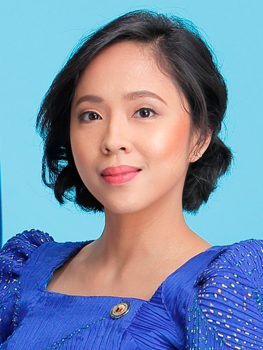
Sarah Elago, Kabataan representative at the Congress from 2016 to 2022.

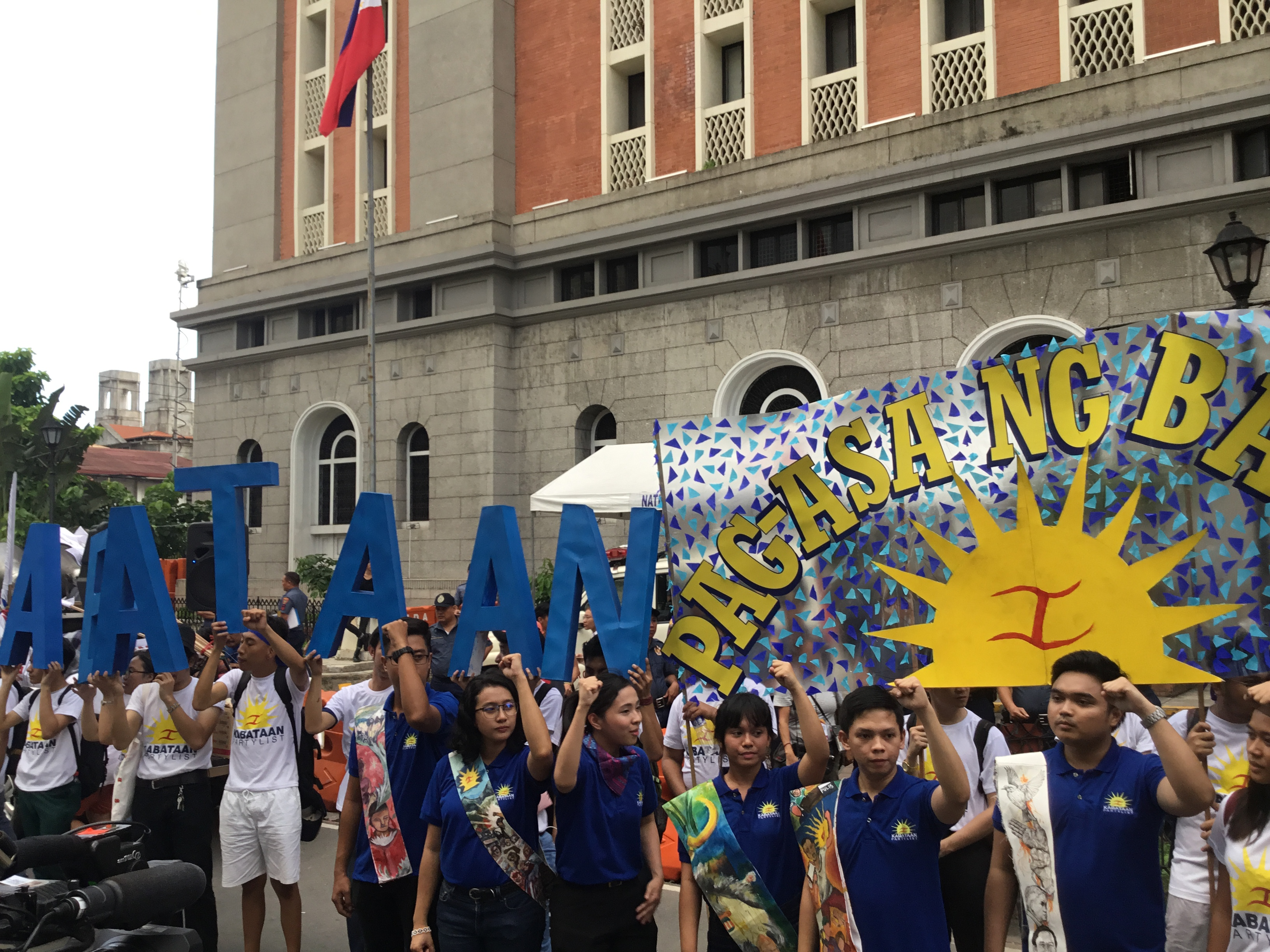
Nominees of the Kabataan Partylist for the 2019 elections, including incumbent Sarah Elago.

At the 2016 elections, the group fielded five nominees led by Sarah Elago, and won a seat. Elago thus became the youngest serving lawmaker in the country. The group managed to win a seat again at the 2019 elections, giving Elago another three years in office. Under the Duterte administration, the group, along with other members of the Makabayan bloc, received increased harassment and allegations from the administration. One particular case was an alleged kidnapping case of an activist, where Kabataan representative Elago and others were implicated on the case. The case was ultimately junked by the Department of Justice and the Supreme Court for "having no sufficient grounds".

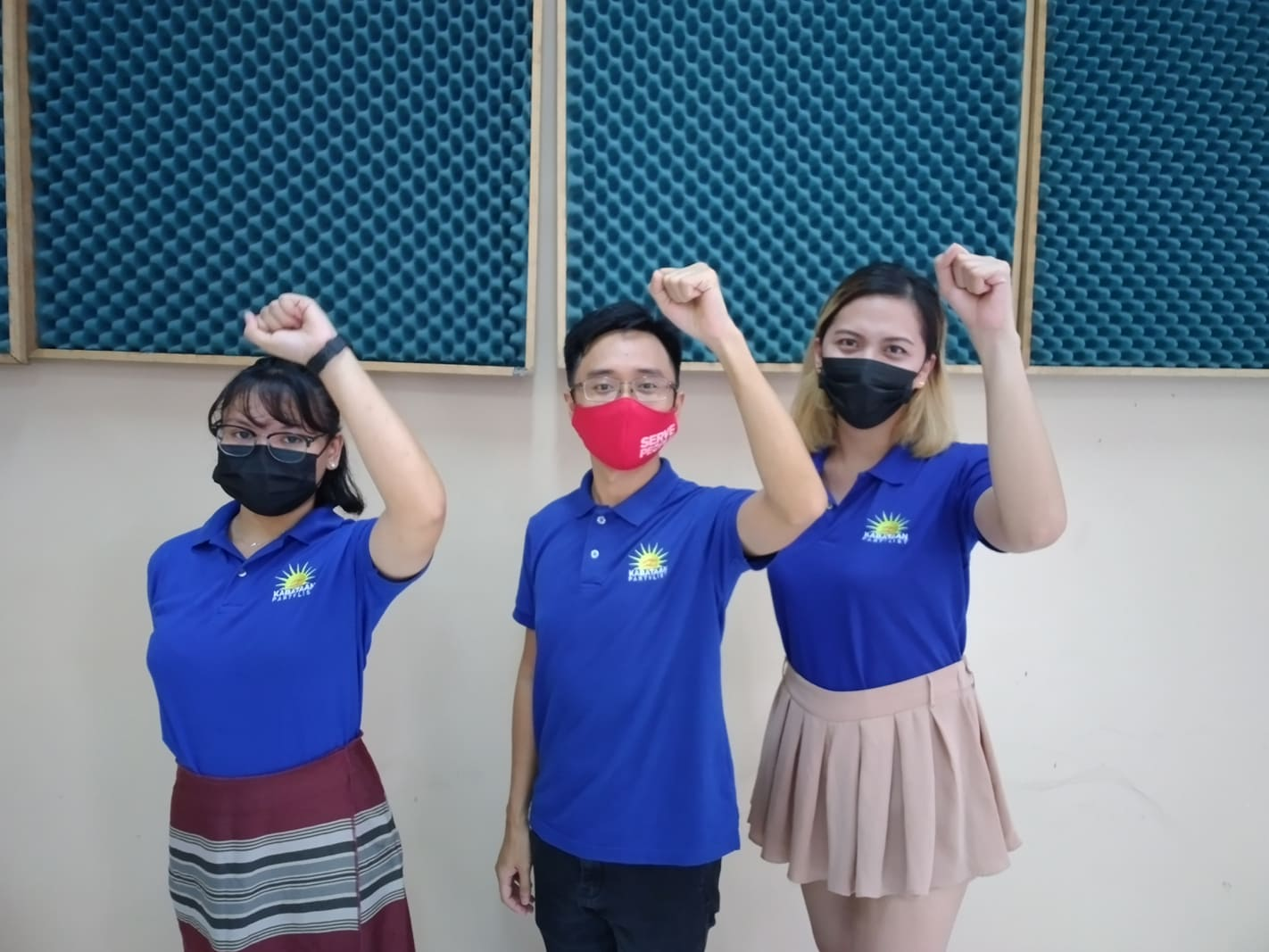
Nominees of the Kabataan Partylist for the 2022 elections: Angelica Galimba, Raoul Manuel, Jandeil Roperos.

The group was also linked by the National Intelligence Coordinating Agency (NICA) and the National Task Force to End Local Communist Armed Conflict (NTF-ELCAC) to the communist group CPP-NPA-NDFP, which the group and other members of the Makabayan bloc strongly denied. This particular case was explored in a 2020 Senate hearing on red-tagging. President Rodrigo Duterte has since denied claims on red-tagging, saying that the government was only "identifying" them as "communists".

=== Marcos administration (2022-current) ===
For the 2025 elections, the partylist fielded former University of the Philippines Student Regent and lawyer Renee Co as the first nominee.

== Electoral performance ==
Election	Votes	%	Seats	Representatives to the Congress
2004	212,000	1.68%	0 / 52	No seats won
2007	228,700	1.43%	1 / 53	Raymond Palatino (14th Congress of the Philippines)
2010	418,776	1.43%	1 / 57	Raymond Palatino (15th Congress of the Philippines)
2013	341,292	1.24%	1 / 59	Terry Ridon (16th Congress of the Philippines)
2016	300,420	0.93%	1 / 59	Sarah Jane Elago (17th Congress of the Philippines)
2019	195,837	0.70%	1 / 61	Sarah Jane Elago (18th Congress of the Philippines)
2022	527,782	1.47%	1 / 63	Raoul Danniel Manuel (19th Congress of the Philippines)
2025	312,344	0.74%	1 / 63	Renee Co (20th Congress of the Philippines)
