= Makabayan =

Political party in the Philippines

- Leader: Satur Ocampo
- President: Liza Maza
- Founded: April 16, 2009; 17 years ago
- Headquarters: Quezon City
- Ideology: National democracy Progressivism
- Political position: Far-left
- National affiliation: Bayan; Nacionalista (2010); Partido Galing at Puso (2016); Coalition for Change (2016–2017); 1Sambayan (2022, 2025)
- Colors: Blue, Red, Yellow
- Senate: 0 / 24
- House of Representatives: 3 / 318
- Provincial governors: 0 / 81
- Provincial vice governors: 0 / 81
- Provincial board members: 0 / 756

Website
- makabayan.ph

Makabayang Koalisyon ng Mamamayan (lit. 'Patriotic Coalition of the People') or simply Makabayan is a national democratic political party in the Philippines. It is also a coalition of three party-list organizations in the House of Representatives, namely Kabataan, Gabriela, and ACT Teachers. It was founded on April 16, 2009 at the Bahay ng mga Alumni in UP Diliman, Quezon City.

== Party-lists ==
As of 2024, four party-lists are fielding candidates under the Makabayan bloc:

- Bayan Muna
- Teachers: Alliance of Concerned Teachers
- Women: Gabriela Women's Party
- Youth: Kabataan

The following partylists have also ran under the bloc:

- Workers and peasants: Anakpawis
- Indigenous people: Katribu
- Migrants: Migrante
- Children's rights: Akap-bata
- Government employees: COURAGE (Confederation for Unity Recognition and Advancement of Government Employees)
- Drivers: PISTON (Pagkakaisa ng mga Samahan ng Tsuper at Opereytor Nationwide)
- Green party: Kalikasan
- Bicolano people: Aking Bikolnon
- Moro people: Suara Bangsamoro
- Health Workers: Health Workers Party-list

In 2016, the Commission on Elections disqualified the Akap Bata and Katribu partylists for failure to acquire the necessary votes.

In 2024, COMELEC delisted and canceled the registration of Anakpawis ahead of the 2025 Philippine general election for "failing to obtain at least two (20) percent of votes cast for the party-list system and failed to obtain a seat in the last two (2) preceding elections."

== History ==
The Makabayang Koalisyon ng Mamamayan (or Makabayan) was formally founded on April 16, 2009 as an alliance between Bayan Muna, Anakpawis, and other progressive party-list groups. Then-Deputy Minority Leader and Bayan Muna representative Satur Ocampo stated that the goal of the alliance was to advance the "politics of change" and a "pro-poor" agenda in the upcoming 2010 elections, and that it was open to working with local political leaders that stood against the traditional political system.

=== Aquino administration (2010-2016) ===
Makabayan fielded its first senatorial candidates in 2010 through former Bayan Muna representative Satur Ocampo and former Gabriela representative Liza Maza. Both candidates ran under the slate of presidential candidate and billionaire Manny Villar. Although the senatorial slate of Villar included Bongbong Marcos, Maza and Ocampo stated that they would not be supporting Marcos's senatorial bid, due to his stance on martial law under his father's rule. Despite this, both of their candidates raising hands with him during an election photo-ops.

Maza and Ocampo were both defeated in the 2010 senatorial elections, placing 25th and 26th. However, the Makabayan bloc won a total of seven seats in the party-list elections, with the addition of a new party-list under the coalition, ACT Teachers. With the opening of the 15th Congress, the Makabayan bloc initially sided with the majority bloc in Congress.

In the 2013 senatorial elections, Makabayan fielded one candidate, namely, Bayan Muna representative Teodoro Casiño. Casiño lost in the senatorial race, placing 22nd. In the 2013 House party-list elections, the Makabayan coalition retained all its seven seats across five party-lists. Makabayan's members in the House were part of the minority bloc against President Aquino.

Although the Makabayan bloc initially sided with the majority bloc in Congress during the first years of Benigno Aquino III's term, the Makabayan bloc was eventually critical of the Aquino administration, citing the persistence of widespread inequality as well as controversial programs like the Disbursement Acceleration Program and the pork barrel scam. On July 21, 2014, representatives Neri Colmenares and Carlos Isagani Zarate of Bayan Muna and Fernando Hicap, along with other activists, filed an impeachment complaint against President Noynoy Aquino for "usurpation of the power of the Legislature" from the DAP. The case was later dismissed due to lack of merit.

During the Aquino administration, Makabayan was also critical of party-list group Akbayan due to perceived closed ties to the administration. The issues between the two leftist parties is rooted in ideological differences, with Akbayan commonly identified with the social democratic center-left and Makabayan being identified with the national-democratic left. During the 2013 senatorial elections, Casiño critiqued former Akbayan representative and then-senatorial candidate Risa Hontiveros for allegedly accepting campaign contributions from Aquino's sisters. Hontiveros was also critical of Casiño due to Makabayan's silence on alleged abuses committed by the New People's Army. After certain leftist groups identified with Makabayan filed a disqualification notice against Akbayan for being a "party in power" that failed to represent the marginalized, groups identified with Akbayan sought the disqualification of Makabayan bloc partylists for being fronts of the Communist Party of the Philippines.

=== Duterte administration (2016-2022) ===
In the 2016 senatorial elections, Makabayan fielded Bayan Muna representative Neri Colmenares, who ran under the Partido Galing at Puso slate of presidential candidate Grace Poe. Colmenares lost and placed 20th. In the 2016 House party-list elections, Makabayan retained its seven seats, where Bayan Muna fell into one seat but ACT Teachers strengthened into two seats.

Makabayan initially welcomed the election of Davao mayor Rodrigo Duterte, who had a friendly relationship with leftist organizations during his term as mayor of Davao City. Several of Duterte's campaign promises were welcomed by Makabayan, including the ending of endo contractualization, opposition to large-scale mining, and the resumption of peace talks with the communist armed movement. In a statement after the 2016 elections, Makabayan recognized the victory of Duterte as an "expression of popular outrage" and a rejection of Aquino's policies.

Upon the election of Duterte, Makabayan bloc joined the supermajority bloc in the lower house, while Duterte also appointed former Makabayan bloc representatives, along with other leftist leaders, as part of his cabinet. Critics of the Makabayan bloc have derided the alliance as having "enabled" Duterte's rise to power, in light of his subsequent human rights violations. In contrast, a political analyst described the relationship between Duterte and Makabayan as "friend-and-foe", cooperating with Duterte in certain key issues while remaining critical of others.

The alliance between Duterte and the Makabayan bloc started to break down after the former allowed the burial of Ferdinand Marcos in the Libingan ng mga Bayani in November 2016. In a press conference, Makabayan representatives called on Duterte to revoke state honors for Marcos, while still remaining supportive of Duterte's "pro-people" policies. Nine months later, in September 2017, the Makabayan bloc ended its alliance with Duterte, leaving the House supermajority to join the minority bloc. In a statement, the group claimed that the Duterte administration had "unraveled as a fascist, pro-imperialist and anti-people regime". In an interview in 2020, Bayan Muna representative Carlos Zarate admitted that they were "tricked" by Duterte into forming an alliance, but that the Makabayan bloc did not regret the alliance as a whole, as they believed that they represented the people's pulse at the time for change.

After the collapse of the alliance, Duterte started to regularly attack the Makabayan bloc, accusing them as "fronts" of the communist armed movement. The National Task Force to End Local Communist Armed Conflict, an anti-communist task force established in 2018 under his administration, also regularly red-tagged members of the Makabayan bloc. In a press conference in December 2020, the Makabayan bloc said that Duterte's red-tagging statements were a cover up for the "incompetence" of the Duterte administration.

In the 2019 senatorial elections, Makabayan fielded Neri Colmenares again as their sole candidate, placing 24. Makabayan also endorsed the senatorial bids of Nancy Binay and Grace Poe, as well as five candidates under the Liberal-led opposition, such as Bam Aquino. In the 2019 party-list elections, Makabayan won six seats.

In November 2021, the Criminal Investigation and Detection Group filed charges of two counts of cyberlibel (violation of the Republic Act No. 10175) against an incumbent and three former Makabayan representatives, former Bayan Muna Rep. Carlos Isagani Zarate and three leaders of the Gabriela Women's Party, Rep. Arlene Brosas, spokesperson Luzviminda Ilagan, and Liza Maza, after the four allegedly made statements accusing the Philippine National Police of red-tagging and planting of evidence. The case stemmed from a CIDG operation on that month to implement a 2015 arrest warrant against an individual for murder. The Department of Justice, in a resolution dated May 12, 2022 but only publicized in September, dismissed the charges for lack of merit.

=== Marcos administration and the Oposisyon ng Bayan (2022–present) ===
In 2021, the Makabayan bloc expressed concerns that the formal endorsement of Leni Robredo by opposition coalition group 1Sambayan was premature, as unity talks were still underway with Robredo, then-senator Manny Pacquiao, and Manila mayor Isko Moreno. In January 2022, Makabayan formally endorsed Robredo for president and Kiko Pangilinan for vice president.

In the 2022 senatorial elections, Neri Colmenares ran alongside labor leader Elmer Labog; both were part of the 1Sambayan senatorial slate, and were guest candidates under the senatorial slates of presidential contenders Leody de Guzman and Manny Pacquiao. Colmenares and Labog finished 24th and 42nd, respectively. In the party-list race of the 2022 House elections, Makabayan won three seats, down from six in the previous elections.

In 2023, ACT Teachers Representative France Castro called for an investigation into the dubious use of 125 million pesos of confidential funds by Vice President Sara Duterte, which Duterte welcomed. The issue of confidential funds were raised again by members of the Makabayan bloc, as well as other Marcos-allied representatives, in 2024. In September 2024, amidst hearings in the House of Representatives, Duterte slammed what she called a political attack by the "Makabayan–Romualdez–Marcos alliance". ACT Teacher representative France Castro denied the alliance allegations.

Makabayan filed an impeachment complaint against Duterte on December 4, 2024. This was the second impeachment complaint filed against Duterte, after Rep. Perci Cendaña of Akbayan and other civil groups filed a complaint two days earlier. The House later voted to impeach Duterte in February.

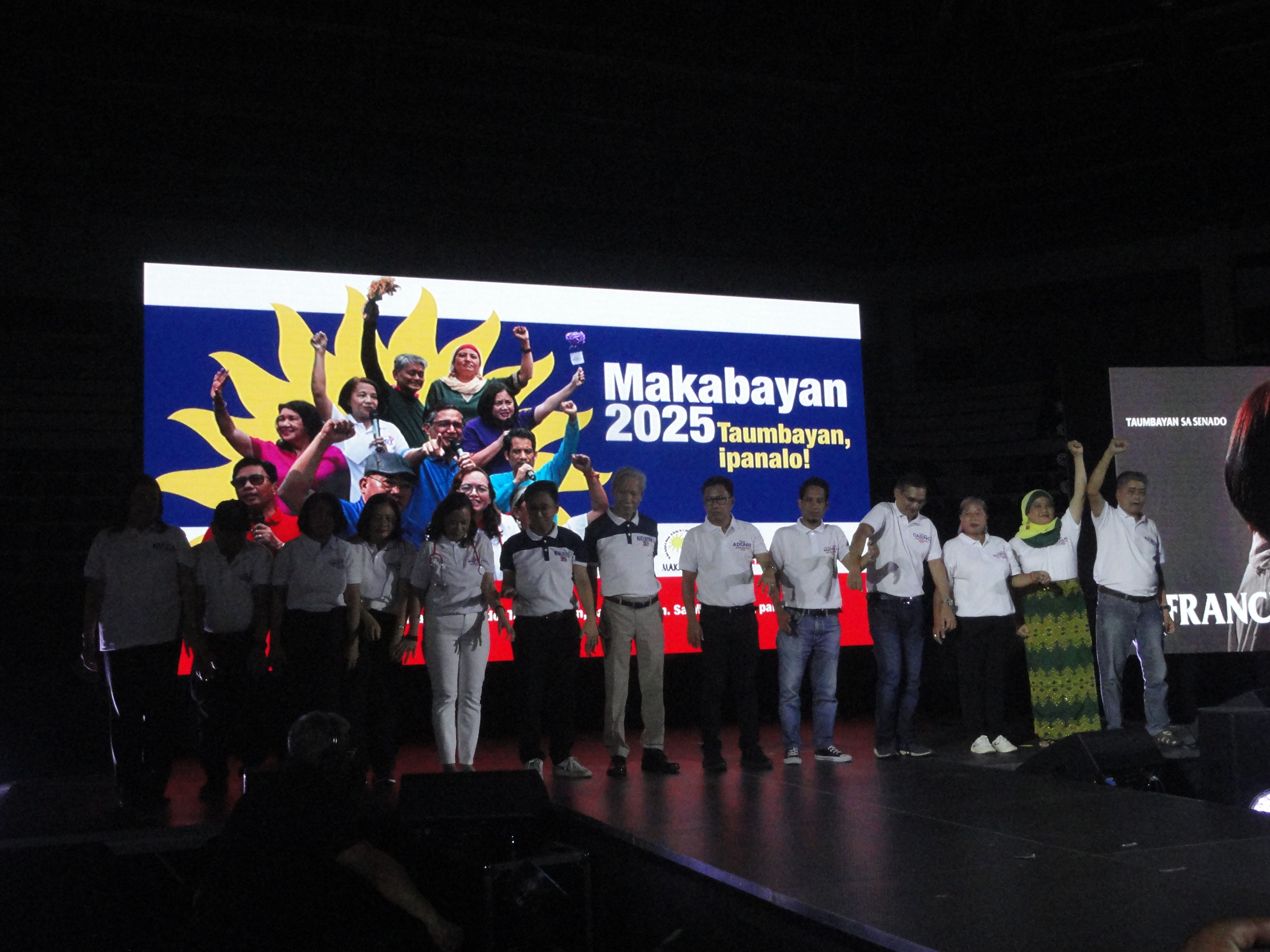
Makabayan senatorial candidates for the 2025 elections.

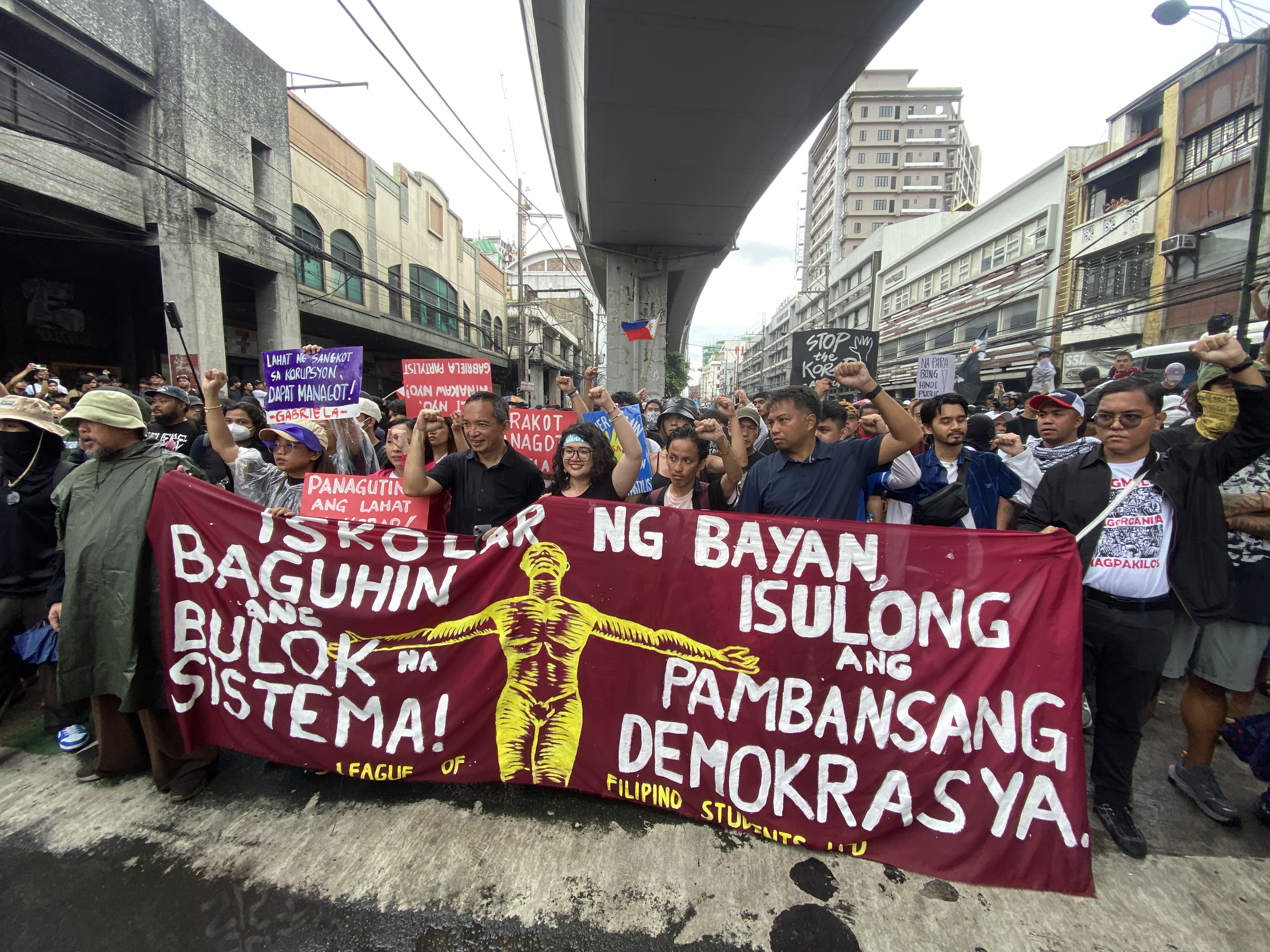
BAYAN and Makabayan leaders near Mendiola during the Baha sa Luneta September 21, 2025 anti-corruption protests.

In the 2025 senatorial elections, Makabayan fielded 11 senatorial candidates:

- Jerome Adonis, labor leader and general secretary of Kilusang Mayo Uno
- Jocelyn Andamo, nurse and general secretary of Filipino Nurses United
- Arlene Brosas, Gabriela representative
- Ronnel Arambulo, vice-chairperson of fisherfolk group Pamalakaya
- Teodoro Casiño, former Bayan Muna representative
- France Castro, ACT Teachers representative
- Mimi Doringo, urban poor leader and general secretary of KADAMAY
- Mody Floranda, president of transport group PISTON
- Amirah Lidasan, Moro activist and co-chair of Sandugo
- Liza Maza, former Gabriela representative and Duterte-appointed Lead Convenor of National Anti-Poverty Commission
- Danilo Ramos, peasant-farmer leader and chairperson of the Kilusang Mambubukid ng Pilipinas

None of Makabayan's candidates won a seat in the Senate. Casiño, Brosas, Ramos, Maza, Arambulo, and Castro were each able to gain at least 3.5 million votes each. In the party-list race, the Makabayan bloc was able to get two seats, down from three in the previous election. Kabataan and ACT Teachers were able to get one seat each. In September, COMELEC chairperson George Garcia said that the allocation of party-list seats in the lower chamber must be 64 in line with the 1987 Constitution. Republic Act 7941 or the Party-list System Act mandates the House of Representatives to guarantee 20% of the available seats in Congress to party-lists. Prior to Gabriela's proclamation, only 63 party-list seats or 19.8% of the total allocated seats in Congress were occupied. After the COMELEC en banc approved a resolution that would increase the allocated number of party-list seats in the lower chamber from 63 to 64 to meet the 20% allocated party-list seats requirement, Garcia announced in a radio interview with DZMM that Gabriela would be given the 64th party-list seat in the House of Representatives, bringing Makabayan's total number of seats to three.

== Electoral performance ==
=== President ===
Election	Candidate	Number of votes	Share of votes	Outcome of election
2010	Supported Manny Villar who lost			
2016	Supported Grace Poe who lost			
2022	Supported Leni Robredo who lost			

=== Vice president ===
Election	Candidate	Number of votes	Share of votes	Outcome of election
2010	Supported Loren Legarda who lost			
2016	Supported Francis Escudero who lost			
2022	Supported Francis Pangilinan who lost			

=== Senate ===
Election	Number of votes	Share of votes	Seats won	Seats after	Outcome of election
2010	7,395,145	2.49%	0 / 12	0 / 24	Lost
2013	4,295,151	1.44%	0 / 12	0 / 24	Lost
2016	6,484,985	2.02%	0 / 12	0 / 24	Lost
2019	4,683,942	1.29%	0 / 12	0 / 24	Lost
2022	7,690,988	1.77%	0 / 12	0 / 24	Lost
2025	28,001,064	6.53%	0 / 12	0 / 24	Lost

=== House of Representatives ===
Election	District elections			Party list election			Total seats	Outcome of election
Election	Votes	%	Seats	Votes	%	Seats	Total seats	Outcome of election
2010	Did not participate			3,218,176	10.70%	7 / 57	7 / 286	Joined the minority bloc
2013	3,870	0.01%	0 / 234	3,284,445	11.86%	7 / 57	7 / 293	Joined the minority bloc
2016	Did not participate			3,988,816	12.28%	7 / 59	7 / 297	Joined the majority bloc
2019	Did not participate			2,304,518	8.27%	6 / 61	6 / 304	Joined the minority bloc
2022	Did not participate			1,592,394	4.11%	3 / 63	3 / 316	Joined the minority bloc
2025	Did not participate			1,085,680	2.58%	3 / 64	3 / 317	Joined the minority bloc
