= The Outstanding Women in the Nation's Service =

The Outstanding Women in the Nation’s Service
- Awarded for: Honoring Filipinas
- Location: Philippines
- Presented by: TOWNS Foundation
- First award: 1974
- Website: TOWNS website

The Outstanding Women in Nation’s Service (TOWNS) award is presented by the TOWNS Foundation to outstanding Filipino women ages 21 to 45 years old who have contributed positively to strengthening national capability and shaping the nation’s future and served as catalysts for economic, social and cultural development, national security and national unity by providing their time, talent and resources. The award is given every three years during the last week of October. Since its inception in 1974, TOWNS has cited 189 women (as of 2022).

== The Awardees ==
Year	Awardee	Field	Notes
1974	Medina H. Delmendo	Agriculture	
1974	Aida D. Eugenio	Science	
1974	Perla S. Ocampo	Medicine	
1974	Elisa (Boots) A. Roa	Arts Cinema	
1974	Flerida Ruth Romero	Law	
1974	Rosa Rosal	Humanities	
1974	Leticia Ramos-Shahani	Foreign Service	
1974	Editha A. Tan	Economics	
1974	Mona D. Valisno	Education	
1977	Zenaida Amador	Performing Arts	
1977	Edwina K. Arroyo	Arts	
1977	Lilia R. Bautista	Public Administration	
1977	Rosario C. Manalo	Foreign Service	
1977	Emily Marohombsar	Education	First awardee from Mindanao
1977	Julia B. Pantastico	Science	
1977	Elsa V. Payumo	Tourism	
1977	Delia E. Torrijos	Science	
1981	Isabel R. Aleta	Humanitarian Endeavor	
1981	Teresita K. Briones	Medicine	
1981	Elnora Cabalfin	Science	
1981	Elizabeth P. dela Fuente	Tourism	
1981	Zenaida G. Gordon	Business	
1981	Roqaiya H. Maglangit	Public Administration	
1981	Leticia J. Magsanoc	Journalism	
1981	Alice Reyes	Arts	
1981	Amelou B. Reyes	Education	
1981	Ingrid S. Santamaria	Arts	
1981	Evelyn R. Singson	Business	
1981	Mercedes C. Teodoro	Law	
1983	Nora Aunor	Performing Arts	
1983	Carmen J. Barredo	Performing Arts	
1983	Julie Y. Daza	Journalism	
1983	Victoria de Guzman	Tourism	
1983	Corazon Santos de la Paz-Bernardo	Business	
1983	Lilia B. de Lima	Law	
1983	Olivia Aguinaldo Ferry	Business	
1983	Evelyn A. Magno	Education	
1983	Nora Z. Petines	Humanitarian Services	
1983	Tricita H. Quimio	Agriculture	
1983	Thelma T. Ramos	Medicine	
1983	Patricia A. Sto. Tomas	Public Administration	
1983	Marlene H. Tamano	Social Work	
1983	Rosalinda V. Tirona	Diplomacy	
1986	Sister Bellarmine Bernas	Education	
1986	Esperanza Cabral	Medicine	
1986	Olivia "Bong" Coo	Sports	
1986	Lourdes J. Cruz	Biochemistry	
1986	Ruby Q. Gonzalez	Social Service	
1986	Cora C. Jacob	Business	
1986	Cecile Licad	Music	
1986	Magda Carolina V. Llamanzares	Nursing	
1986	Alicia O. Lustre	Food Technology	
1986	Maria V. Montelibano	Media	
1986	Miriam Defensor Santiago	Law	
1986	Zenaida Y. Ubaldo	Rural Development	
1989	Cecille G. Alvarez	Performing Arts	
1989	Rowena S. Arrieta	Performing Arts	
1989	Lydia B. Brown	Educational Television	
1989	Ma. Rosa U. Carrion	Business	
1989	Corazon P.B. Claudio	Science and Technology	
1989	Sister Teresa R. Dagdag	Community Development	
1989	Celeste L. Gallardo	Performing Arts	
1989	Cheche Lazaro	Broadcast Journalism	
1989	June Caridad P. Lopez	Psychiatry	
1989	Evelyn Mae T. Mendoza	Science	
1989	Lisa Macuja	Performing Arts	
1989	Margarita J. de la Rama	Business	
1989	Aurora G. del Rosario	Agriculture	
1989	Paulynn P. Sicam	Print Journalism	
1989	Vivien M. Talisayon	Performing Arts	
1989	Luzviminda Santos Valdez	Social Work	
1989	Imelda Virginia G. Villar	Education	
1992	Zorayda Amelia C. Alonzo	Government Service	
1992	Teresita Ang See	Cultural Integration	
1992	Mediadora Claudio Saniel	Medicine	
1992	Ma. Nieves R. Confesor	Government Service	
1992	Virginia C. Cuevas	Agriculture	
1992	Teresita Q. Deles	Community Service	
1992	Elena J. Golez	Drug Abuse Prevention	
1992	Elizabeth P. Marcelino	Child Rehabilitation	
1992	Corazon Soliman	Community Development	
1992	Ma. Beatriz P. Tesoro	Cultural Revival	
1992	Mel Tiangco	Broadcast Journalism	
1992	Cristina L. Yuson	Education	
1995	Ma. Cynthia Rose B. Bautista	Government Service	
1995	Ma. Karina A. Bolasco	Book Publishing	
1995	Emilia T. Boncodin	Public Administration	
1995	Gloria T. Climaco	Business Management	
1995	Rina J. David	Women’s Rights Advocacy	
1995	Ma. Leonora V. de Jesus	Public Administration	
1995	Cynthia E. Dominguez	Medicine	
1995	Lorna P. Kapunan	Law	
1995	Millie L. Kilayko	Entrepreneurship Development	
1995	Yolanda V. Ong	Communications	
1995	Loren Legarda	Broadcast Journalism	
1995	Aida D. Solsoloy	Agriculture	
1998	Rhodora R. Aldemita	Science	
1998	Carmina Noela A. Aquino	Medicine	
1998	Tessie C. Nunez	Agriculture	
1998	Ester B. Ogena	Education	
1998	Lilian F. Patena	Agriculture (Plant Tissue Culture)	
1998	Maria Lea Carmen I. Salonga	Performing Arts	
1998	Ma. Lourdes A. Sereno	Law	
1998	Evalyn G. Ursua	Law	
1998	Monica Anne E. Wilson	Performing Arts	
1998	Ma. Helena T. Yap	Science	
2001	Maria Victoria M. Abesamis	Medicine	
2001	Clarita P. Aganon	Government Service	
2001	Grace N. Aves	Contemporary Culture	
2001	Queena Lee Chua	Education	
2001	Olivia P. Damasco	Agriculture	
2001	Bernadette J. Madrid	Medicine	
2001	Maria Antonette J. Menez	Science	
2001	Clarissa Emerita G. Ocampo	Extraordinary Public Service	
2001	Leah Victoria R. Reyes	Education	
2001	Jessica Soho	Broadcast Journalism	
2004	Alicia Rita Arroyo	Business	
2004	Maria Josephine Barrios	Arts	
2004	Madonna Casimero	Science and Technology	
2004	Ces Drilon	Journalism	
2004	Raquel Fortun	Medicine	
2004	Catherine Guballa	Public Service	
2004	Chin Chin Gutierrez	Environment Protection	
2004	Marichu Lambino	Law	
2004	Aura Matias	Industrial Engineering	
2004	Deanie Lyn Ocampo	Education	
2004	Blessilda Raposa	Education	
2004	Fernandina Sandico-Ong	Arts	
2007	Glecy Cruz Atienza	Arts and Culture	
2007	Eva Maria Cutiongco-de la Paz	Medicine	
2007	Maria Corazon de Ungria	Science	
2007	Elizabeth H. Lee	Business	
2007	Dina S. Ocampo	Education	
2007	Alyssa M. Peleo-Alampay	Science	
2007	Hilly Ann Maria Roa-Quiaoit	Environmental Conservation	
2007	Maria A. Ressa	Broadcast Journalism	
2007	Alexandra Prieto Romualdez	Print Media	
2007	Catherine P. Vistro-Yu	Education	
2010	Therese Badoy	Education	Founder, Rocking Society through Alternative Education
2010	Arlene Bag-ao	Law	Member, House of Representatives
2010	Kara Patria Constantino–David	Broadcast Journalism	Journalist
2010	Laura David	Oceanography	First among five oceanographers in the country to earn the award
2010	Therese Fernandez	Social Entrepreneurship	President, Rags2Riches (Youngest TOWNS awardee)
2010	Jo Enrica Enriquez	Humanitarian Endeavour	Executive director, Coalition Against Trafficking in Women (Asia-Pacific)
2010	Regina Hechanova–Alampay	Psychology	Research specialist
2010	Carmela Lapitan	Urology	First female urologic surgeon admitted as diplomate in the Philippine Board of Urology
2010	Stella Quimbo	Economy	Economic professor
2010	Marissa Romero	Agriculture	Research specialist
2010	Myla Villanueva	Information & communications Technology	President, Global Telecom Women's Network
2013	Atty. Darlene Marie Berberabe	Government Service	Chief executive officer, Pag-IBIG Fund; lawyer
2013	Noraida Abdullah Karim	Social Work	Deputy Director for Philippine Programme of the Community and Family Services, International
2013	Ani Karina Brown	Sports	Women empowerment program manager; tri-athlete
2013	Karen Davila	Broadcast Journalism	ABS-CBN journalist
2013	Rachelle Gerodias	Performing Arts	Country's premier soprano
2013	Gemma Narisma	Atmospheric Science	
2013	Eleanor Pinugu	Social Entreprise; Education	Founder of a non-profit school
2013	Ma. Amihan Ramolete	Theater Arts	Manager, Teatrong Mulat ng Pilipinas
2013	Maricor Soriano	Physics	President, Samahang Pisika ng Pilipinas
2016	Cherrie Atilano	Social Development	Founder of an agri-social enterprise in Marinduque
2016	Hidilyn Diaz	Sports	First Filipino female Olympic medalist
2016	Patricia Evangelista	Media	First Filipino winner in an annual public speaking competition in London; journalist
2016	Luisa Lorenzo	Arts	Established the first photography gallery in Southeast Asia
2016	Marissa Martinez	Government Service	Commissioned officer, Philippine Navy
2016	Aisa Mijeno	Social Enterprise	Founder, Sustainable Alternative Lighting Corp.
2016	Sabrina Ongkiko	Education	Public school teacher
2016	Jocelle Batapa–Sigue	Information and Communications Technology	One of the creators, National Information and Communication Technology Confederation of the Philippines
2019	Ma. Regina Justina Estuar	Science and Technology	Working for Ateneo de Manila University as an ICT-based center executive director and a social computing laboratory head
2019	Stephanie Sy	Technology Entrepreneurship	Founder, Thinking Machines Data Science, Inc.
2019	Carmina Bayombong	Entrepreneurship	Founder, InvestEd
2019	Dr. Gay Jane Perez	Science and Technology	UP Diliman professor who led a program that sent Diwata-1 into orbit in 2016.
2019	Bai Rohaniza Sumndad–Usman	Education	Founder, Teach Peace Build Peace Movement, Inc., involved in the programs for Marawi siege evacuees
2019	Samira Gutoc	Peace Advocacy	Organizer of a volunteer group for Marawi siege evacuees; former ARMM legislator and former commissioner, Bangsamoro Transition Commission; journalist
2019	Karla Patricia Gutierrez	Performing Arts	Founder, Philippine Opera Company
2019	Clarissa Isabelle Delgado	Education	Founder, Teach for the Philippines (TOYM awardee, 2016)
2019	Geraldine Zamora	Health and medicine	Rheumatologist; pioneered the Philippine Vasculitis Study Group, as well as programs for cancer patients, for indigent patients, and for the treatment of lupus
2019	Atty. Patricia Ann Prodigalidad	Law	Lawyer; local and international arbitrator; 1996 Bar Examination topnotcher
2019	Chiara Zambrano	Journalism	ABS-CBN News correspondent (TOYM awardee for the same field, 2017)
2019	Xyza Bacani	Humanities	Photographer for various international companies
2022	Ani Rosa Almario	Education and entrepreneurship	From the Adarna House
2022	Rubilen Amit	Sports	Billiards World Champion
2022	Dr. Pia D. Bagamasbad	Medicine and public health	Molecular biologist
2022	Dr. Beverly Lorraine Ho	Medicine and public health	From the Department of Health
2022	Dr. Erika Fille Legara	Data science	
2022	Keisha Alena Mayuga	Transport planning	
2022	Ana Patricia Non	Community service	Community pantry organizer
2022	Anna Rosario Oposa	Marine ecology conservation	Environmentalist
2022	Patricia Marie "Pia" Ranada	Investigative journalism	Rappler journalist
2022	Georgina Romero	Women empowerment through Information and Communications Technology	
2022	Dr. Aletta T. Yñiguez	Marine science	
