= Community pantries in the Philippines =

Food banks in the Philippines during the COVID-19 lockdown

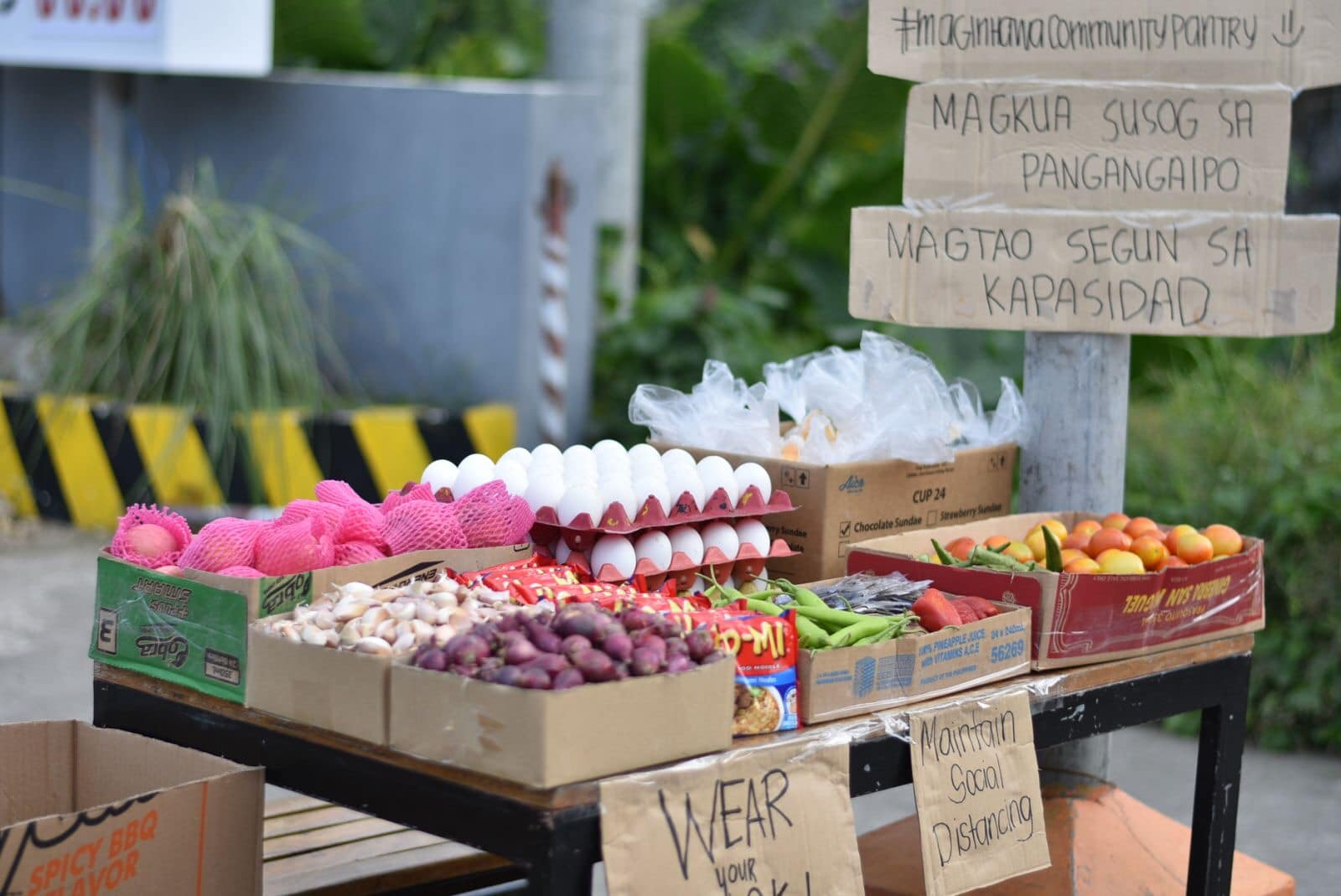
A community pantry in Camaligan, Camarines Sur

Community pantries in the Philippines are food banks established by Filipinos popularized during the country's COVID-19 community quarantine.

On April 14, 2021, local entrepreneur Ana Patricia Non worked with farmers and local vegetable vendors to put up a small food bank for her community on Maginhawa Street in Quezon City, putting up a sign that invited people to "give according to your ability, take according to your need." The initiative caught the attention of Filipinos on social media, creating a "snowball effect", with citizens setting up their own pantries in their communities and inspiring people from other countries to do the same.

Initiated without any government support, some community pantries and their organizers were initially interrogated and red-tagged by National Task Force to End Local Communist Armed Conflict (NTF-ELCAC) spokesperson Lt. Gen. Antonio Parlade Jr. and Presidential Communications Undersecretary Lorraine Badoy-Partosa as possible sympathizers and recruiters of insurgent left-wing militant organizations.

By April 20, 2021, press reports noted that there were already more than a hundred citizen-organized community pantries throughout the Philippines. On April 22, the Philippine Daily Inquirer reported that there were already at least 350 such pantries throughout the country.

== Background ==
Around the time community pantries became a phenomenon, the country had recorded nearly one million COVID-19 cases, and a sudden spike in the number of cases had occurred earlier in April, bringing the number of deaths from the disease beyond 16,000. President Rodrigo Duterte had earlier called the COVID-19 pandemic "a small thing" ("maliit na bagay") despite the positivity rate at the time breaking previous records.

The spike in cases prompted the Philippine government to impose an enhanced community quarantine on Metro Manila and the adjacent provinces of Bulacan, Rizal, Cavite, and Laguna, which entitled workers and low-income Filipinos to receive aid (ayuda) from the government. Despite allocating ₱23 million to 80% of the low-income population in the aforementioned areas, the distribution of aid to these regions was slow and hampered by issues related to logistics and health concerns.

In the meantime, intermittent lockdowns had led the Philippine economy to contract by 9.5 percent in 2020, the highest since the Marcos dictatorship. This led to the closure of many businesses, and an estimated 4.2 million Filipinos were unemployed in February 2021.

=== Maginhawa community pantry ===
While food bank or community fridge initiatives are not new to the Philippines, the community pantry movement popularized in the Philippines in April 2021 is attributed to a food bank started by Ana Patricia Non, in coordination with farmers, local vendors, and volunteers. Non was a visual communication alumnus of the University of the Philippines Diliman College of Fine Arts who had been forced to close her furniture refurbishing business due to the pandemic. Having participated in community feeding programs in the past, Non placed a bamboo cart full of essential supplies, such as alcohol, rice, vegetables, and canned goods along Maginhawa Street in her neighborhood of Teachers Village East in Quezon City on April 14, 2021. She then put up a sign that encouraged people to "give according to your ability, take according to your need."

Although Maginhawa is a middle-class neighborhood known for food, art and proximity to the University of the Philippines Diliman, it is also near a number of urban poor communities, whose residents visited the new community in droves. Non then shared images of the initiative on social media, and the idea quickly became viral.

Donors were inspired by the initiative to donate to the Maginhawa community pantry, including a group of farmers from the distant province of Nueva Ecija, who asked their Roman Catholic parish priest to deliver a donation of fresh vegetables on their behalf, and a group of farmers from Paniqui, Tarlac, who sent a harvest of sweet potato (Ipomoea batatas).

Non later noted that the community pantry initiative became a way for Filipinos to prove to themselves that they can organize and help one another in times of need.

== Spread of community pantries ==
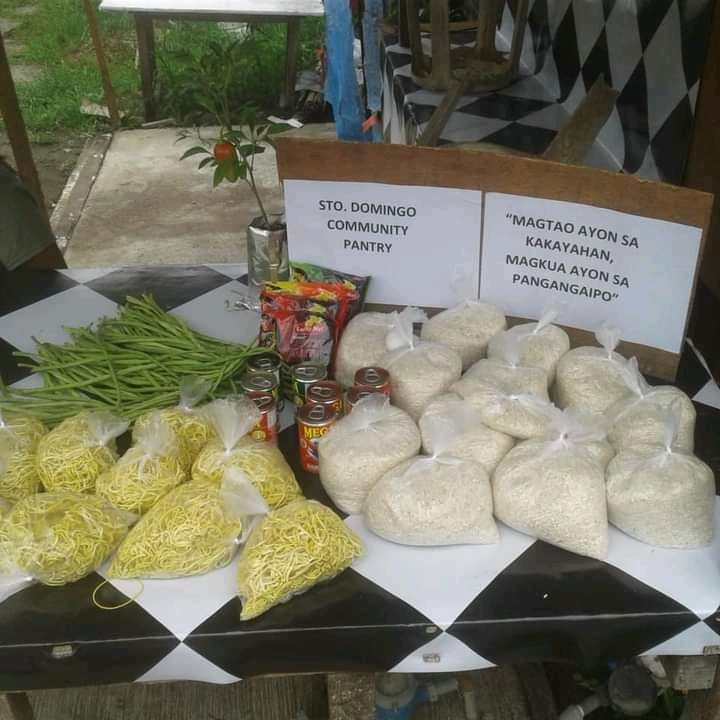
Another community pantry in Camaligan, Camarines Sur

The Maginhawa community pantry had gone viral on social media, prompting other communities to establish their own pantries, the first on nearby C. P. Garcia Avenue, where a small community pantry was put up within hours of Non's initiative going viral on social media. Pantries on the nearby Matiyaga Street, along P. Noval Street in Sampaloc, Manila, and in the Grove area of Barangay Batong Malake in Los Baños, Laguna soon followed. Eventually, pantries were set up in even more distant places in the Philippines, such as Iligan and Puerto Princesa.

The Roman Catholic social action arm Caritas Philippines called on Roman Catholic dioceses throughout the Philippines to support the community pantry movement by setting up their own community pantries or reviving the various community aid stations they had previously established.

By April 20, 2021, less than a week after Non first put up the Maginhawa community pantry, press reports estimated that there were already more than a hundred citizen-organized community pantries throughout the Philippines.

On May 18, 2022, the United States Embassy in Manila, through ad interim chargé d'affaires Heather Variava, awarded the Ambassador's Woman of Courage Award to Non for her efforts in inspiring Filipinos to combine resources and help one another during the COVID-19 pandemic.

On June 26, at the Dragon Star Awards, Non was among those honored by the Quezon City Association of Filipino-Chinese Businessmen, Inc. for her contributions during the pandemic.

=== Pantry variations ===
One of the earliest variations of community pantries was a Halal community pantry put up by an organization of Filipino Muslim doctors, catering to Muslim Filipinos who were observing Ramadan at the time that the community pantries became popular.

Another variant was created by the Philippine Animal Welfare Society, which set up a "community PAW-ntry" for pet owners who needed supplies for their pets during the quarantine.

The movement also encouraged the establishment of community gardens and other food initiatives.

==== Ivermectin pantry ====
On April 29, 2021, Anakalusugan party-list representative Mike Defensor and SAGIP party-list representative Rodante Marcoleta initiated a distribution event in Matandang Balara, Quezon City, where beneficiaries would receive a minimum of three doses of the antiparasitic drug ivermectin in compounded form for free. This was organized despite warnings from the World Health Organization on the lack of evidence to support ivermectin's efficacy against COVID-19. The event organizers were allowed by the Food and Drug Administration (FDA) to distribute ivermectin, provided that official prescriptions were given by doctors.

However, reports indicated that doctors who were present at the event to issue such prescriptions were issuing invalid prescriptions, written on blank sheets of paper without the doctor's name and tax receipt number, which is required by law under Article 6, Section 46c of Republic Act 10918 (Philippine Pharmacy Act).

In response, the Department of Health (DOH) and the FDA issued a joint statement discouraging the use of ivermectin for the treatment of COVID-19, and warned the public against doctors issuing invalid prescriptions lacking the aforementioned details, whose credentials will be endorsed to the Professional Regulation Commission (PRC) for sanctions and legal action.

=== Outside the Philippines ===
By April 22, 2021, the community pantry movement inspired the first community pantry outside the Philippines, with the opening of a pantry in Dili, East Timor. Numerous other pantries in other locations in East Timor opened over the next few days.

== Sociological and other academic analyses ==
Various sociologists, in analyzing the success of the community pantry movement, have been quick to associate the phenomenon as representations of number of Filipino cultural traits and values, most notably not only the "spirit of bayanihan," reciprocity, and an emphasis on community relations, but also resilience and diskarte.

Philippine Star analyst Kimani Franco cited Reynaldo G. Alejandro's 1980 New York Times description of bayanihan as a connotation of "team spirit, an atmosphere of unselfish cooperation, and it represents the nature of family and village life throughout the Philippine archipelago," and cited this particular value as a reason why the initiative is not "overwhelmed by human greed." Mindanao State University-Iligan Institute of Technology sociology Professor Arnold Alamon noted that the communities exposed a "phenomenon of hunger and poverty" in which "even in the urban places and semi-urban center in the provinces, there are those who are in need. They keep their silence because they could not go out and yet they are affected in this worst economic decline." University of the Philippines sociologist Athena Charanne Presto noted that the community pantries were a way for the ordinary citizen to take action in the face of a crisis, adding that the community pantries movement can be seen as acts of resistance against the failure of the government to adequately address citizens' needs, against the biased and discriminatory view of the poor as selfish and greedy, and against aid initiatives from institutions that are difficult to trust.

Meanwhile, a study conducted by a team from the Philippine Sociological Society noted that the proliferation of community pantries could be an indication that public opinion about the inadequacy of the administration's response to the pandemic was solidifying along two fronts: the lack of an appropriate and comprehensive healthcare initiatives to respond to the pandemic, and the inadequate provision of economic subsidies for citizens most affected by the accompanying lockdown. University of the Philippines Diliman Philippine studies professor and pop culture expert Mykel Andrada noted that community pantries' use of cardboard signage helped make the pantries attractive to the urban poor, since they reflected materials that they use in everyday life. He also noted that they were a reminder of the cardboard box signages used in extrajudicial killings, and that the urban poor could take pleasure in their being used for kindness instead of for murder.

== Red-tagging controversy ==
Organizers of the community pantries, which had operated largely without help from or coordination with the government soon became a target of "red-tagging" by local units of the Philippine National Police (PNP), as well as the National Task Force to End Local Communist Armed Conflict (NTF-ELCAC) that Duterte established after shuttering national-level peace talks with communist insurgents in December 2018.

Notable incidents include various social media posts published by the Quezon City Police District (QCPD) and the NTF-ELCAC containing unsubstantiated claims that community pantries were affiliated with insurgents and were being used as a front to recruit rebels for their cause. The organizers of the Maginhawa community pantry had to temporarily halt operations out of concern for the safety of their volunteers being red-tagged and interrogated by state forces, given the history of harassment and extrajudicial killings of red-tagged individuals.

The Maginhawa community pantry resumed its operations after Quezon City mayor Joy Belmonte assured the organizers and the public that the city government would ensure the safety of community pantry organizers and beneficiaries. The mayor also ordered a probe of red-tagging and profiling by Quezon City police.

Non became a focal point of the NTF-ELCAC's attention, as the task force's spokesman, Lt. Gen. Antonio Parlade Jr., questioned the rapid spread of community pantries across the country and compared Non's role in the community pantry phenomenon to Satan giving Eve the forbidden fruit. Unrelenting, he would later tag, in a Christmas message, politicians such as economic liberal and declared NTF-ELCAC supporter Leni Robredo and Christian institutions such as the University of San Carlos as being affiliated with a "satanic cult", referencing the cultural Marxism conspiracy theory and Karl Marx's family's alleged "satanic" Sabbateanism. Presidential Communications Undersecretary Lorraine Badoy, who was also a co-spokesperson of the NTF-ELCAC, likewise accused Non of being part of ARMAS, which was allegedly an underground communist organization. Both Parlade and Badoy drew criticism from Filipinos online for the improbability of their statements.

Philippine National Security adviser Hermogenes Esperon Jr. later issued a gag order instructing the two not to speak about the community pantries, and the National Privacy Commission denounced Parlade's unjust profiling of Non and other individuals, but other officials, including President Duterte himself, later belittled the efforts of the organizers in a public speech.

== Similar initiatives ==
Although the sudden popularity of community pantries in April 2021 is notable, the concept of food banks, community fridges, and other food-related community initiatives is not new to the Philippines.

The Roman Catholic social action arm Caritas Philippines noted that various dioceses in the majority-Catholic country had previously organized community "aid stations" and called on those dioceses to reorganize them in support of the community pantry movement.

== After the COVID-19 pandemic ==
After nearly five years, community pantries reappeared in 2026 during the Philippine energy crisis and the subsequent declaration of a state of national energy emergency, catering to jeepney drivers and other public utility vehicle (PUV) drivers. The Maginhawa pantry reopened on March 26, following a Facebook post by Ana Patricia Non.
