= Raquel Fortun =

Filipina pathologist and academic

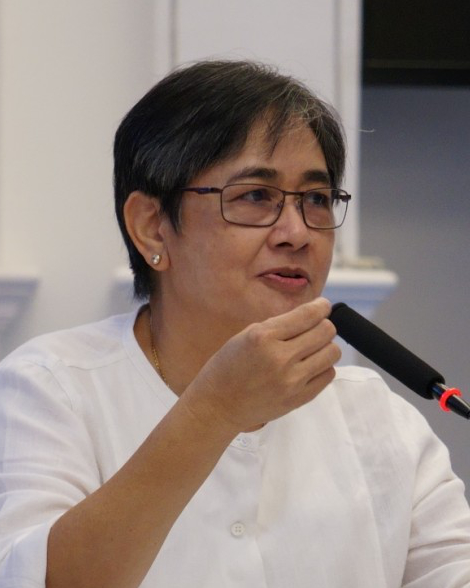
- Fortun in 2024
- Education: University of the East Ramon Magsaysay Memorial Medical Center University of the Philippines Diliman
- Occupations: Professor, Forensic Pathologist
- Known for: Mother of Forensic Pathology in the Philippines
- Spouse: Vincent Lohengrin Fortun
- Children: 1

Raquel Barros del Rosario-Fortun is the first Filipina forensic pathologist practicing in the Philippines. She is a professor at the College of Medicine of the University of the Philippines Manila and the current chairperson of the Department of Pathology.

In May 2026, Fortun was named head of forensic science and independent investigation protocols under the Truth and Reconciliation Commission, an independent body tasked with investigating human rights abuses during the Philippine drug war.

== Education ==
Fortun took up primary and secondary education at the University of the Philippines Integrated School before pursuing a B.S. in Psychology in 1979 as her pre-medical course at the University of the Philippines Diliman. Eventually, she earned her Doctor of Medicine degree from the University of the East Ramon Magsaysay Memorial Medical Center College of Medicine.

== Career ==
Fortun learned about forensic pathology through one of her seniors at the University of Philippines Manila's Department of Pathology, and was offered to specialize in forensic pathology under Dr. Donald Reay of the King County Medical Examiner's office in Seattle, Washington in 1994. To her, this was a difficult and heartbreaking ordeal, because it also meant leaving her then-three-year-old daughter Lisa behind at the time.

Following her one-year training in Seattle, Raquel returned to the Philippines in 1995 and has since been consulted in various cases, her first being the Ozone Disco fire. From then on, she has been involved in cases such as the Dacer-Corbito case, the 2006 Subic Rape Trial, the 2005 Ortigas shooting incident, the Asian Spirit tragedy, the Maguindanao massacre, the death of Trina Etong, the wife of Ted Failon, the assassination of Benigno Aquino Jr., the death of National Democratic Front of the Philippines peace consultant Randall "Ka Randy" Echanis, and the murder of radio journalist and broadcaster Percy Lapid.

On May 27, 2026, the independent and civilian-led Truth and Reconciliation Commission (or the EJK Truth Commission) was established to investigate the Philippine drug war initiated by President Rodrigo Duterte, with Fortun named as head of forensic science and independent investigation protocols.

== Personal life ==
Growing up, young Fortun loved cleaning the fish that her mother would occasionally purchase from the market. This, along with the influence of her paternal aunt Dr. Lourdes Baens del Rosario, sparked Fortun's love for medicine and inspired the latter to become a doctor, despite coming from a family of lawyers - a decision that, according to her, "slightly disappointed" her father.

Her paternal grandmother is Nieves Baens del Rosario, a writer, civic leader and one of the first women lawyers in the Philippines.

She is married to obstetrician-gynecologist Vincent Lohengrin A. Fortun; they have a daughter named Lisa.

== See also ==
- The Outstanding Women in the Nation's Service
