= Abduction of Jonila Castro and Jhed Tamano =

2023 abduction in the Philippines

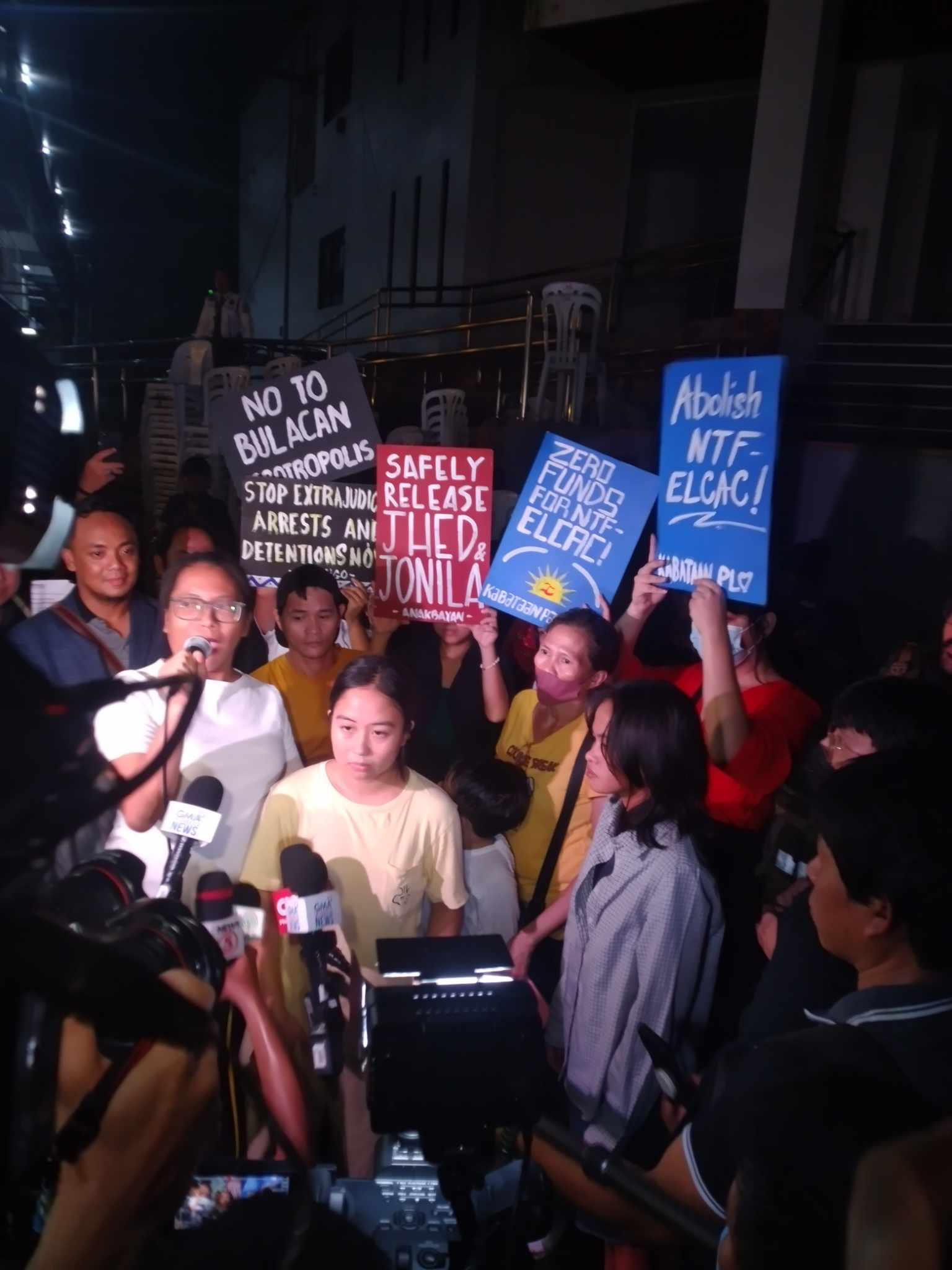
Jhed Tamano (center left) and Jonila Castro (center right) at the Commission on Human Rights after their release

On September 2, 2023, the youth environmental activists Jonila Castro and Jhed Tamano disappeared in Orion, Bataan, Philippines, while volunteering for communities along Manila Bay affected by development and reclamation activities. On September 19, they surfaced on a press conference organized by government and military agencies intended to present them as rebels who had surrendered. The pair told the media that they were abducted by state forces, prompting the pair to be released following pressure from human rights groups, protesters, and Makabayan representatives.

== Background ==
From 1986 to January 2024, 1,911 individuals have been victims of enforced disappearances in the Philippines. As of October 2023, 18 activists have been abducted during the presidency of Bongbong Marcos. Human rights groups said that in the month of Castro and Tamano's abduction, the military abducted three Indigenous activists who were investigating human rights violations in central Mindoro.

In September 2024, Global Witness reported that the Philippines was the most dangerous country in Asia for environmental defenders. From 2012 to 2023, 248 environmental activists were killed in the Philippines, accounting for 64% of the 468 killed in Asia. Several environmentalists, including Castro and Tamano, were abducted in 2022 to 2024 during the presidency of Bongbong Marcos.

== History ==
Jonila Castro, then 21, and Jhed Reiyana Tamano, then 22, were the community organizers of Alliance for the Defense of Livelihood, Housing, and Environment in Manila Bay (Akap Ka Manila Bay) and the program coordinator of Community and Church Program for Manila Bay of the Ecumenical Bishops Forum. They volunteered along towns in Bataan, a province in Manila Bay, where communities had been affected by reclamation and development projects. Because of their advocacy, they experienced human rights violations such as red-tagging, intimidation, and harassment before their abduction. On September 2, 2023, while doing investigative work and preparing for relief operations in Lati, Orion, the two were abducted by armed men wearing face masks and forced into a gray sports utility vehicle. Only a shoe and a slipper were left behind. The police then said that they were in a safe house and that they approached authorities.

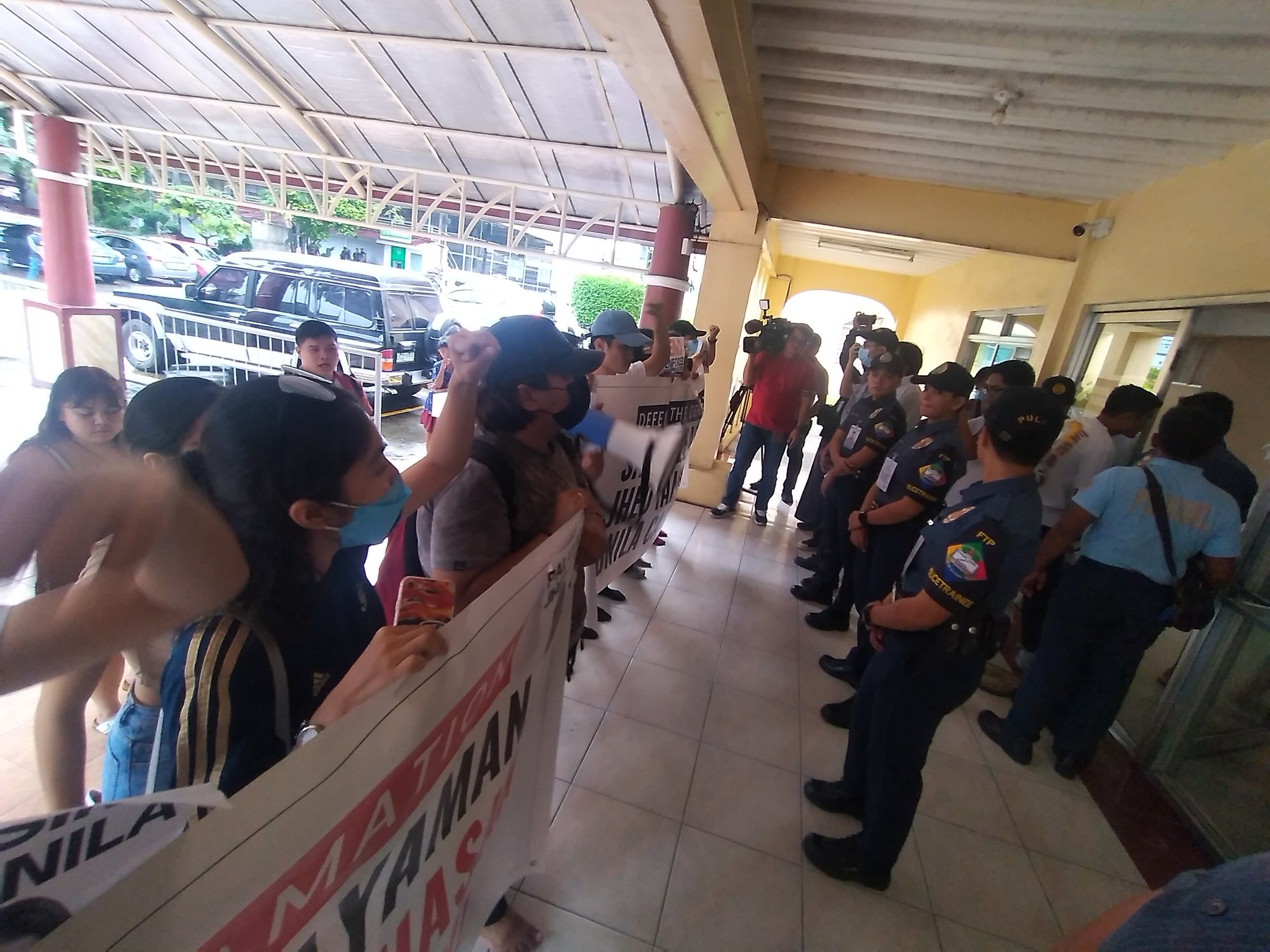
Activists, church people, and lawyers holding a rally at the entrance of Plaridel Municipal Hall and confronting policemen after the press conference of Tamano and Castro

On September 19, 2023, they surfaced in a press conference by the National Task Force to End Local Communist Armed Conflict (NTF-ELCAC), the Armed Forces of the Philippines (AFP), and the local government of Plaridel, Bulacan. Instead of saying that they were rebel returnees or members of the New People's Army, they said that they were abducted by government forces and were forced to present themselves as rebels who had surrendered. Pressure from human rights groups, protesters, and Makabayan Congress representatives led to their immediate release.

In January 2024, Lt. Col. Ronnel dela Cruz of the Philippine Army's 70th Infantry Battalion filed a defamation complaint against Castro and Tamano, claiming that Castro and Tamano's statements during the press conference embarrassed the AFP.

On February 15, 2024, the Supreme Court of the Philippines granted two writs of amparo and habeas data as well as protection from the 70th Infantry Battalion of the AFP, members of the Philippine National Police Bataan, and the NTF-ELCAC in response to a charge of slander and grave oral defamation. The temporary protection order prohibited Lt. Col. Ronnel dela Cruz from approaching within one kilometer of Castro and Tamano. Despite these legal safeguards, Castro and Tamano subsequently claimed that they were still being tracked.

In December 2024, Castro and Tamano sued government officials over their abduction and detention. The respondents were Lt. Col. Ronnel de la Cruz, the National Security Council's Jonathan Malaya, Niño Balagtas of the National Intelligence Coordinating Agency, and Lt. Col. Mario Jose Chico of the NTF-ELCAC for alleged violations of the Anti-Enforced or Involuntary Disappearance Act of 2012, the Anti-Torture Act of 2009, and the law on human and civil rights under custodial investigation.

In June 2025, a Plaridel, Bulacan, court dismissed the defamation charges filed by dela Cruz against Castro and Tamano.

In December 2025, the Supreme Court upheld the writs of amparo and habeas data issued to Castro and Tamano, dismissing the military and the police's motion questioning the protective writs. Environmental group Kalikasan said ruling exposed "the brazen tactics of state forces who abduct, harass, and terrorize those who dare defend the environment and fight for the rights of communities under attack."

== See also ==
- Abduction of Dyan Gumanao and Armand Dayoha
- Enforced disappearances in the Philippines
- List of solved missing person cases: post–2000
