= Gavriel Salvendy =

American ergonomist

- 加弗尔·萨文迪 (Chinese)
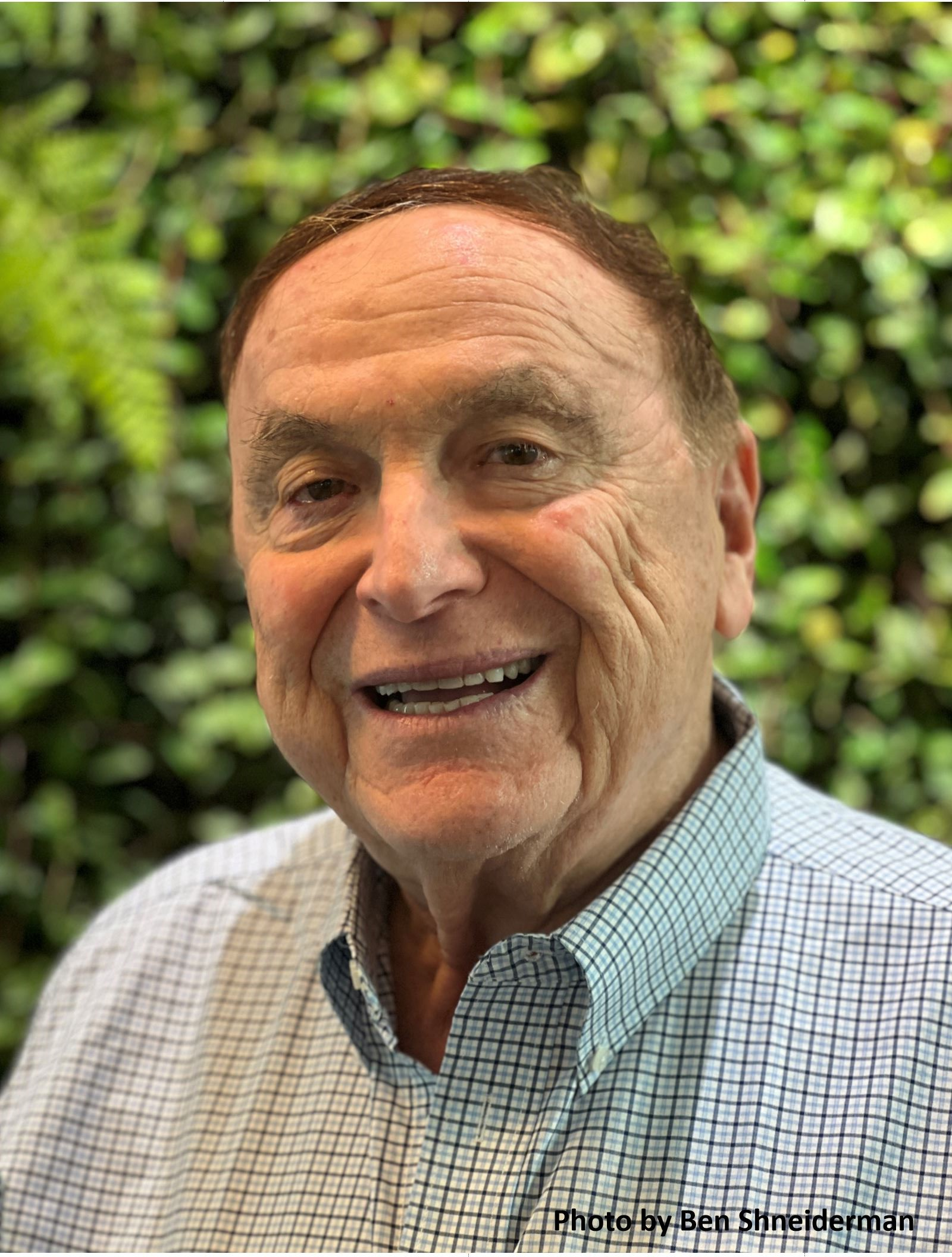
- Born: 30 September 1938 (age 87)
- Education: Brunel University; University of Birmingham
- Known for: a pioneer in the field of human factors and ergonomics the first one in this field elected to the National Academy of Engineering
- Scientific career
- Fields: Human factors Ergonomics
- Workplaces: Purdue University (professor emeritus); Tsinghua University (Chair Professor Emeritus and Former Head (2001-2011) of the Department of Industrial Engineering); University of Central Florida (Distinguished Professor)
- Doctoral students: Aura Matias

Gavriel Salvendy (born September 30, 1938) is a pioneer in the field of human factors and ergonomics. In 1990, he was elected a member of the National Academy of Engineering (NAE) for fundamental contributions to and professional leadership in human, physical and cognitive aspects of engineering systems.

He is the recipient of the John Fritz Medal which is the engineering profession's highest award. He is professor emeritus of Industrial Engineering at Purdue University, Chair Professor and former Head of Industrial Engineering at Tsinghua University---- first foreign scientist to head a university department in China since 1949, and Distinguished University Professor at the University of Central Florida.

He is also the editor of the four editions of the Handbook of Human Factors and Ergonomics and the three editions of the Handbook of Industrial Engineering.
