= Jonathan Malaya =

Filipino author and official (born 1973)

Jonathan E. Malaya PhD, MPSA
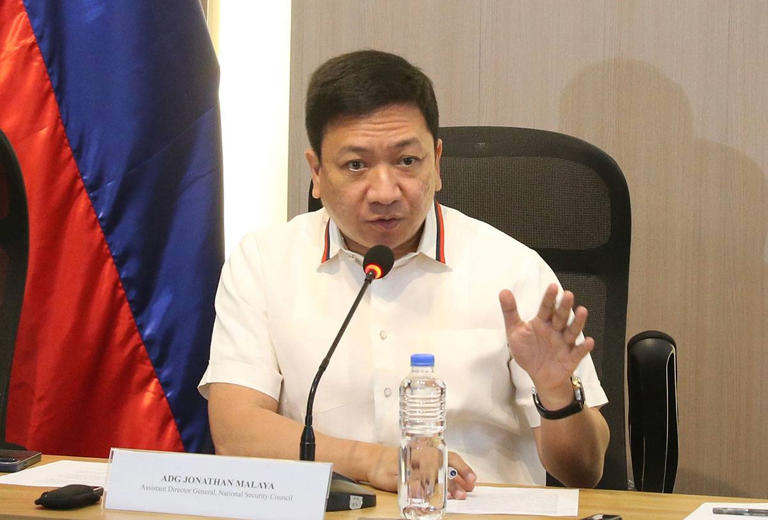

Assistant Director General of the National Security Council
- Incumbent
- Assumed office March 6, 2023
- President: Bongbong Marcos
- Preceded by: Charitie Joaquin

Assistant Secretary of the Office of the Chief Presidential Legal Counsel
- In office March 1, 2006 – May 1, 2007
- President: Gloria Macapagal-Arroyo

Assistant Secretary of the Department of Education
- In office May 2, 2007 – June 30, 2010
- President: Gloria Macapagal-Arroyo

Undersecretary of the Department of the Interior and Local Government
- In office October 11, 2017 – June 30, 2022
- President: Rodrigo Duterte

Personal details
- Born: Jonathan E. Malaya Naga City, Camarines Sur, Philippines
- Spouse: Atty. Melanie S. Malaya
- Children: 2
- Education: University of the Philippines Diliman (AB); San Sebastian College-Recoletos (AB); Asian Institute of Management (Development Management); Philippine Public Safety College Master of Public Safety Administration, Doctorate in Public Safety and Security Governance; UP Alpha Phi Beta Fraternity
- Occupation: Government Official College Professor; TV and Radio Host Writer
- Committees: Inter-Agency Task Force for the Management of Emerging Infectious Diseases; National Task Force COVID-19; National Task Force on the West Philippine Sea; National Task Force to End Local Communist Armed Conflict; National Intelligence Board

Jonathan E. Malaya is a Filipino writer, author, businessman, and public official who is currently the Assistant Director General of the National Security Council. Prior to joining the NSC, he was undersecretary of the Department of Interior and Local Government. He also served as Assistant Secretary in the Office of the President of the Philippines, and Assistant Secretary for Special Projects and Legislative Liaison in the Department of Education of the Philippines.

== Background ==
Malaya was born in Naga City, Camarines Sur, Philippines. He grew up in Iriga City where he attended elementary and high school at La Consolacion Academy (now La Consolacion College).

He pursued his undergraduate studies in the University of the Philippines, Diliman, Quezon City where he was a founding member and president of the UP Debate Society, Philippine Collegian writer, and member of the Alpha Phi Beta fraternity. He won the championship of the annual UP Pi Sigma Open Debate Tournament in 1992. Later on, Malaya took his Master in Public Safety Administration and Doctorate degree in Public Safety and Security Governance at the Philippine Public Safety College where he earned the prestigious Lapu-Lapu Leadership Award during his doctoral studies.

== Public service ==
Malaya immediately joined government service after college. In a career in public service spanning 20 years, he had stints in all three branches of the government first serving as a Legislative Staff Officer to then Samar Congressman (later Supreme Court Justice) Antonio Eduardo B. Nachura in the House of Representatives of the Philippine Congress. He later served as Chief Legislative Staff Officer to then Senator (later Department of Interior and Local Government Secretary) Mar Roxas in the Philippine Senate.

In 2005 he served in the Executive Branch as Chief of Staff to then Education Secretary (later Department of Budget and Management Secretary) Florencio B. Abad. A year later, at age 32, he was appointed Assistant Secretary in the Office of the Chief Presidential Legal Counsel by President Gloria Macapagal Arroyo. He was later seconded by Arroyo to the Office of the Solicitor General again as Chief of Staff.

In 2007, he served briefly as Judicial Staff Head to Associate Justice Antonio Eduardo B. Nachura in the Supreme Court of the Philippines before he returned to the Department of Education as Assistant Secretary during the term of then Education Secretary Jesli A. Lapus.

After his stint at the Department of Education, Malaya joined the Pasay City government in 2011 as Spokesperson and Public Information Officer under Mayor Antonino G.Calixto. During that time he also serve as Senior Technical Adviser on Education and Electoral Reform to the Foundation for Economic Freedom, and The Asia Foundation, and Legal Network for Truthful Elections.

In 2017, he was appointed as Assistant Secretary for Capacity Development, Public Affairs and Communication in the Department of Interior and Local Government by President Rodrigo Roa Duterte. He was later appointed as administrator of Federalism, on that same year. DILG Officer in Charge Eduardo Año appointed him as the new DILG spokesperson. During the COVID-19 pandemic, Malaya was appointed to the Inter-Agency Task Force for the Management of Emerging Infectious Diseases and the National Task Force-COVID-19. From 2022 to 2023, Malaya served as the executive director of the Local Government Development Institute.

Malaya is currently serving as Assistant Director General at the National Security Council under the administration of National Security Adviser Eduardo Año. Concurrent to his role as the Assistant Director General for Strategic Communications, he is also the co-chair of the Information Working Group of the National Task Force on the West Philippine Sea, the Chair of the Strategic Communications Cluster of the National Task Force to End Local Communist Armed Conflict, and a member of the National Intelligence Board.

== Teaching career ==
Malaya was a part-time lecturer at the College of Economics, Finance, and Politics of the Polytechnic University of the Philippines and at the Assumption College San Lorenzo. He taught political theory and English literature. Malaya was also a former Senior Lecturer at the University of the Philippines National College of Public Administration and Governance and the University of Makati. He also served as Regent of the City University of Pasay and was instrumental in the establishment of the Imus City Polytechnic Institute. Malaya is currently a Senior Lecturer at San Sebastian College Recoletos and the Development Academy of the Philippines.

He is now on his second term as board member of the National Music Competition for Young Artists (NAMCYA), a resident company of the Cultural Center of the Philippines.

== Department of Education ==
In the Department of Education, Malaya chaired both the Association of South East Asian Nations (ASEAN) Senior Officials in Education Meeting and the South East Asian Ministers of Education (SEAMEO) High Officials Meeting in 2009–2010. He also headed the Philippine Delegation to ASEAN + 3 (China, Japan, Korea) Senior Officials Meeting on Education in 2010. He was also a member of the Board of Trustees of the ASEAN Universities Network as well as the Governing Board member of the SEAMEO Regional Center QITEP-English based in Jogjakarta, Indonesia.

== Teacher's welfare ==
As DepEd Legislative Liaison Officer, he successfully secured Congressional support to upgrade the salary grade and salaries of all public school teachers through Congressional Joint Resolution No. 4, otherwise known as the Salary Standardization Law III.

With the support of Gawad Kalinga and local government units, he spearheaded the construction of socialized housing projects for teachers in Camarines Norte, Cebu and Davao City. As OIC-Superintendent of Baguio Teachers’ Camp, he implemented a Master Redevelopment Plan that transformed the once run-down facility into DepEd's premier training and recreation center. He also established the Sining Pambansa Festival and institutionalized the Pambansang Gawad sa Ulirang Kabataan.

He received a Presidential Citation from Arroyo and the DepEd Certificate of Recognition from Education Secretary Armin Luistro for outstanding performance in the public sector.

== Written works ==
Malaya has written five (5) books, which include Stewards of the Nation: Inaugural Visions from Aguinaldo to Duterte, which climbed the eighth place on the PowerBooks Best Seller List, and So Help Us God: The Presidents of the Philippines and Their Inaugural Addresses which he co-wrote with his brother Ambassador J. Eduardo Malaya, Liberal Views on Constitutional Reform and Hit the Podium!: Getting Started in Debate. Other works include Federalism 101: A Primer, and the Quest for a Federal Republic, both of which explore principles and prospects of Federalism in the Philippines.
