= National Task Force to End Local Communist Armed Conflict =

Philippine anti-communist conflict task force

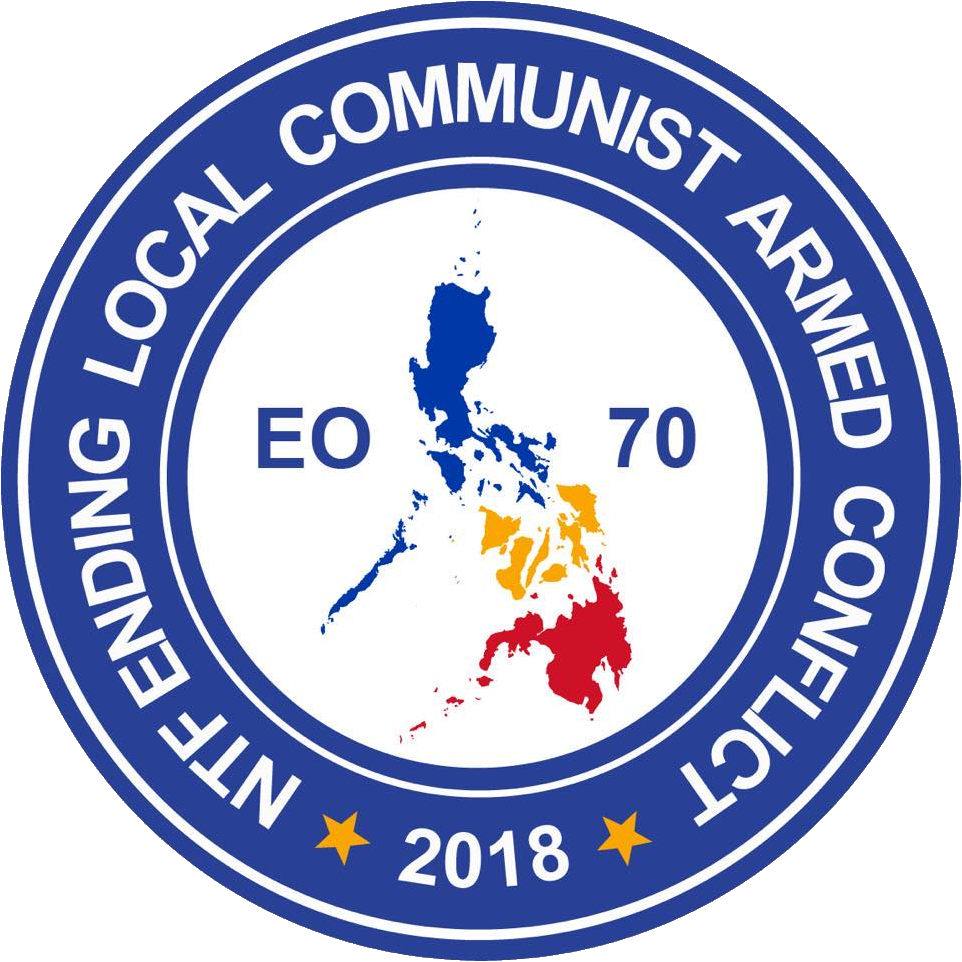

Task force overview
- Formed: December 4, 2018; 7 years ago
- Jurisdiction: Philippines
- Task force executives: Bongbong Marcos, Chairperson; Eduardo Oban, Vice Chairperson; Vacant, Co-Vice chairperson; Ernesto Torres Jr., Executive Director
- Parent department: Office of the President
- Key document: Executive Order No. 70, s. 2018
- Website: www.ntfelcac.org

The National Task Force to End Local Communist Armed Conflict (NTF-ELCAC) is a task force organized by the government of the Philippines in 2018 as part of its "Whole-of-Nation approach" to respond to and raise awareness about ongoing communist armed conflicts in the Philippines, after the administration of President Rodrigo Duterte formally terminated peace talks between the Philippine government and the New People's Army in November 2017.

== Background ==
Executive Order No. 70 signed by President Rodrigo Duterte on December 4, 2018

The National Task Force to End Local Communist Armed Conflict (NTF-ELCAC) was formed on December 4, 2018, pursuant to Executive Order No. 70 issued by President Rodrigo Duterte which institutionalized the government's "whole-of-nation" approach in tackling the ongoing communist rebellion in the Philippines led by the Communist Party of the Philippines (CPP) and its armed wing, the New People's Army (NPA). The "whole-of-nation" approach is contrasted to prior policy which favored irregular peace talks with communist rebels. The executive order was announced to the public on December 10.

The formation of the NTF-ELCAC followed the formal termination of peace talks between the Philippine government and the NPA when President Rodrigo Duterte issued Presidential Proclamation 360 on November 23, 2017, citing continued attacks by the NPA despite the then ongoing peace negotiations. The CPP and NPA were likewise formally designated as terrorist organizations by the government.

According to the President's proposed budget, the NTF-ELCAC was to be allotted ₱7.8 billion for 2025, triple the NTF-ELCAC's budget from the previous year.

== Composition ==
The NTF-ELCAC is composed of 12 operational clusters or lines of effort administered by various relevant government agencies:

- Basic Services Cluster
- E-CLIP and Amnesty Program Cluster
- Infrastructure, Resource Management and Employment Cluster
- International Engagement Cluster
- Legal Cooperation Cluster
- Local Government Empowerment Cluster
- Localized Peace Engagement Cluster
- Peace, Law Enforcement and Development Support Cluster
- Poverty Reduction, Livelihood and Empowerment Cluster
- Sectoral Unification, Capacity Building Empowerment and Mobilization Cluster
- Situational Awareness and Knowledge Management Cluster
- Strategic Communication Cluster

Regional (RTF-ELCAC), provincial (PTF-ELCAC), city (CTF-ELCAC), municipality (MTF-ELCAC), and barangay (BTF-ELCAC) task forces have been formed to implement at the local level the NTF-ELCAC's whole-of-nation approach.

== Activities and programs ==
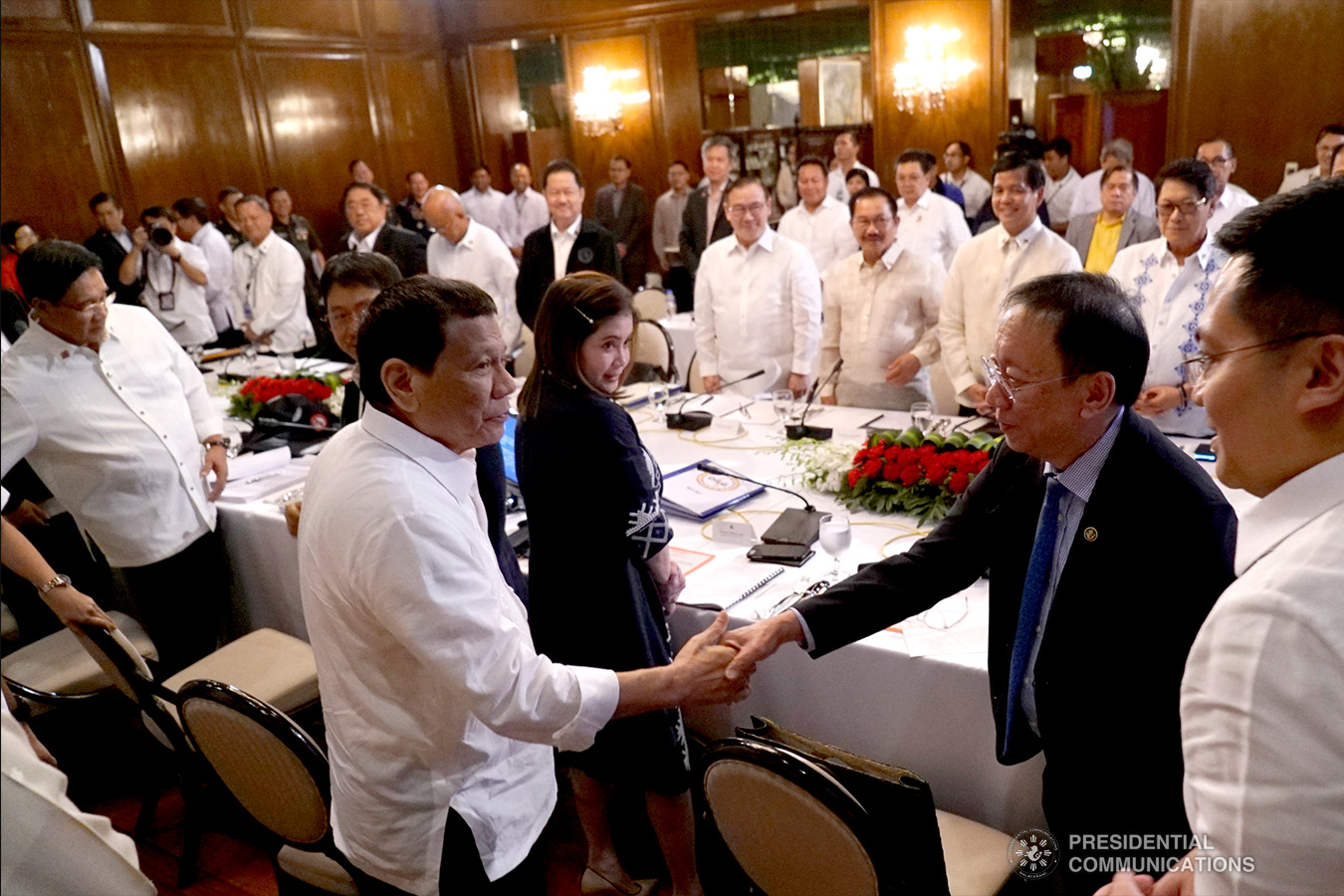
President Rodrigo Duterte (foreground, 3rd from right) presides over a meeting with the NTF-ELCAC at the Malacañan Palace on April 15, 2019

=== Campaign against suspected front organizations ===
The NTF-ELCAC maintains a campaign against the ongoing communist rebellion in the Philippines, as well as against groups that it claims to be front organizations of the communist group. It maintains that it has the duty to warn the public against "dubious groups with links to communist terrorist organizations". The task force's allegations has been criticized as an act of "red-tagging". The NTF-ELCAC on its part falsely claim that the term "red-tagging" was invented by the CPP-NPA and the usage of such term is a move to discredit the task force's allegations.

Among the notable groups the NTF-ELCAC has alleged to be a communist rebel front is the Makabayan bloc, whose members were elected to the House of Representatives. The allegations of the NTF-ELCAC is an "official stance" of the task force. The NTF-ELCAC also made the same accusation against left-wing human rights organization Karapatan, which filed a lawsuit against the task force for alleged violations against Philippine Act on Crimes Against International Humanitarian Law, Genocide and Other Crimes Against Humanity in response.

The NTF-ELCAC's also conducted background checks on organizers of community pantries set up by volunteers as a response to the COVID-19 pandemic for possible links to the CPP-NPA, which led to calls to defund the NTC-ELCAC.

In 2025, labor groups and human rights organizations criticized the NTF-ELCAC, stating that NTF-ELCAC uses red-tagging justify the killing of workers who call for humane working conditions and higher salaries.

=== Barangay Development Program ===
The Barangay Development Program (BDP) is a socioeconomic program of the NTF-ELCAC for barangays that have been deemed free from communist rebel influence by the national government. It is described by the task force as an approach to address the root causes of insurgency such as "hunger, disease, poverty, injustice and hopelessness" so that the communities would be less susceptible to fall under the influence of the communist insurgents. The government identified as eligible for the program 822 remote conflict-ridden barangays classified as "geographically isolated and disadvantaged areas (GIDAs)" cleared from communist insurgency influence. The CPP has downplayed the BDP, calling it a "band-aid solution" and believed that the program does not satisfy the "fundamental demand for genuine land reform and the clamor for respect of ancestral lands". The BDP was allotted a ₱2.6 billion budget under the 2024 General Appropriations Act; as of August 2024, the Department of the Interior and Local Government stated that none of NTF-ELCAC's 885 BDP projects in 2024 have been completed.

A 2024 Commission on Audit report tagged as "irregular" a ₱154.77 million fund spent by the Butuan City government in 2023 under the NTF-ELCAC's Barangay Development Program. In Iloilo, the Commission on Audit flagged the provincial government's uncompleted projects under the Barangay Development Program.

In October 2025, Kabataan Partylist Representative Renee Co urged the government to reallocate the NTF-ELCAC's billion-peso budget to fund agriculture, education, and social services. Co called the BDP a "bogus development program" that goes to corruption and the militarization of rural communities.

According to Karapatan, people are invited to attend aid giving events, which turn out to be surrender ceremonies where they aid recipients presented to audiences as "armed rebels returning to the law". Karapatan allege that the barangay development program results in fake surrenders and threatens freedom of expression and freedom of association. Peasants are made to sign a document stating they are NPA surrenderees, according to reports in the Bicol region, where Karapatan says there have been four extrajudicial killings and 95 instances of human rights violations during the presidency of Bongbong Marcos. As of March 2025, Karapatan recorded 560 victims of forced or fake surrenders under Marcos.

In August 2025, President Bongbong Marcos announced a ₱8.1 billion budget just for the NTF-ELCAC's barangay development program for 2026, triple the program's budget from the previous year. Catholic church groups questioned the proposed budget, saying that infrastructure projects are mere "palliatives" if poverty, farmer landlessness, political dynasties, and corruption remain. Caritas criticized NTF-ELCAC's red-tagging of civil society organizations and said that public assistance programs should not be used by the security sector to attack democratic freedoms.

=== Balik Loob Program and E-CLIP ===
The Balik Loob Program provides a mechanism for former communist rebels who surrendered to the government to reintegrate to mainstream society.

The Enhanced Comprehensive Local Integration Program (E-CLIP) is a program established through Administrative Order No. 10 signed by President Duterte on April 3, 2018. Under the program, the Department of the Interior and Local Government provides a package of financial, livelihood, and reintegration assistance, as well as firearms remuneration to rebel and extremist surrenderers, including their families and communities. As of April 2023, there were 37,413 former rebels and former violent extremists who availed of the program since its inception. The Commission on Audit's 2020 Annual Audit Report said that ₱1.28 million disbursed under E-CLIP lacked documentation, suggesting possible invalid transactions.

== Administration ==
The NTF-ELCAC was created as a government organization under the Office of the President of the Philippines with the Philippine president serving as its chairman, and the National Security Advisor as its vice chairman. Other members include:

Secretaries of the following executive departments

- Department of National Defense
- Department of the Interior and Local Government
- Department of Justice
- Department of Social Welfare and Development
- Department of Education
- Department of Information and Communications Technology
- Department of Finance
- Department of Budget and Management
- Department of Public Works and Highways
- Department of Agrarian Reform
- Department of Trade and Industry
- Department of Human Settlements and Urban Development
- Department of Health
- Department of Agriculture

Other

- Presidential Adviser on Peace, Reconciliation and Unity
- Special Assistant to the President for Investment and Economic Affairs
- National Food Authority Administrator
- Bureau of Fisheries and Aquatic Resources Director
- National Housing Authority General Manager
- Executive Secretary
- Special Assistant to the President
- Armed Forces of the Philippines Chief of Staff
- Philippine National Police Chief
- National Intelligence Coordinating Agency Director General
- National Commission on Indigenous Peoples Chairman
- National Economic and Development Authority Director General and Socioeconomic Planning Secretary
- National Security Council Director General and Adviser
- National Bureau of Investigation Director
- Commission on Human Rights Chairman
- National Youth Commission Chairman
- Civil Service Commission Chairman
- National Anti-Poverty Commission Lead Convenor
- Commission on Higher Education Chairman
- Technical Education and Skills Development Authority Director General
- Presidential Communications Office Chief
- Office of Civil Defense Administrator
- Presidential Adviser on Military and Police Affairs
- And two representatives from the private sector appointed by the President

== Communications ==
The NTF-ELCAC has eight spokespersons, each dedicated to certain matter/s. Prior to May 10, 2021, the task force only had two spokespersons. There are plans to have additional spokespersons to cover each of the Philippines' regions.

NTF-ELCAC Spokespersons
Official	Official designations and agency	Coverage
Vacant	n/a	Security Sector Operations
Lorraine Marie Badoy	Undersecretary, New Media and External Affairs Presidential Communications Operations Office	Social Media Affairs, Sectoral Concerns
Jonathan Malaya	Undersecretary, Plans, Public Affairs and Communication Department of the Interior and Local Government	Local Government Affairs, Barangay Development Program
Severo Catura	Undersecretary, Presidential Human Rights Committee Secretariat	International Affairs, Peace Process, Human Rights Concerns
Jose Joel Sy Egco	Undersecretary, Presidential Task Force on Media Security	Mass Media Engagement, Fact-Checker
Vacant	n/a	NTF-ELCAC Public Affairs and Information Youth Concerns
Marlon Bosantog	Regional Director, Cordillera Autonomous Region Regional Director, Caraga Region National Commission on Indigenous Peoples	Legal Affairs, Indigenous Peoples Concerns
Gaye Florendo	National Commission on Indigenous Peoples	Assistant spokesperson on NTF-ELCAC Public Affairs and on Indigenous Peoples Concerns

== Administrative and criminal complaints ==
Some officials who served under the NTF-ELCAC face complaints before the Office of the Ombudsman and the Commission on Elections (COMELEC). In December 2020, Karapatan alleged in a complaint that Duterte supporter and NTF-ELCAC spokesperson Lorraine Badoy-Partosa is criminally and administratively liable for her "persistent, relentless and malicious red-tagging and vilification" of Karapatan. Also named in the complaint was then-NTF-ELCAC spokesperson Lt. Gen. Antonio Parlade.

In March 2022, left-wing partylist members Kabataan Rep. Sarah Jane Elago, Gabriela Women’s Party Rep. Arlene Brosas, and Alliance of Concerned Teachers (ACT) Rep. France Castro filed criminal complaints against Badoy and nine other NTF-ELCAC executives for electioneering and allegedly violating the Omnibus Election Code. The complaints cited two separate statements issued by the NTF-ELCAC: On March 14, Badoy alleged that presidential candidate Leni Robredo made a pact with the Communist Party of the Philippines-New People's Army-National Democratic Front (CPP-NPA-NDF); On March 21, Badoy released a statement alleging that Kabataan, Anakpawis, Bayan Muna, ACT Teachers, and Gabriela are "urban operatives" of the CPP-NPA-NDF. The complaint contends that the statements constitute "political advertisement" or "election propaganda".

Journalist and Nobel Prize laureate Maria Ressa filed in 2022 an administrative complaint against Badoy at the Office of the Ombudsman over posts calling Ressa a "sociopath" and a "master bullshitter". The complaint alleges that Badoy’s posts violated the Code of Conduct and Ethical Standards for Public Officials. The complaint contends that the posts were "malicious and defamatory remarks which transgress boundaries of professional decorum and protocol".

In 2022, the National Union of Peoples' Lawyers filed a motion with the Court of Appeals to declare Badoy in contempt of court after Badoy interviewed on SMNI retired army general Jovito Palparan, who was convicted of kidnapping and illegal detention in 2018.

In September 2023, the Office of the Ombudsman found Parlade and Badoy guilty of conduct prejudicial to the best interest of the service for red-tagging activists.

In February 2024, the Supreme Court convicted Badoy of indirect contempt for red-tagging a Manila Regional Trial Court judge in September 2022. The Supreme Court ordered Badoy to pay a ₱30,000 fine.

In December 2024, a Quezon City Regional Trial Court ordered Badoy and SMNI TV co-host Jeffrey Celiz to pay damages of ₱2.08 million for red-tagging journalist Atom Araullo, to compensate for the effect of "red-tagging and its effects on his personal life and career as a journalist". The court order was the first application of the May 2024 Supreme Court ruling that defined red-tagging as a threat to a person's right to life, liberty, and security.

In 2025, the Gabriela Women's Party filed before the COMELEC a complaint against the NTF-ELCAC on allegations of systematic red-tagging and sexual harassment, under COMELEC Resolution No. 11116, or the Anti-discriminatory and Fair Campaigning Guidelines.

=== Abduction of Jonila Castro and Jhed Tamano ===
In February 2024, the Supreme Court of the Philippines granted writs of amparo and habeas data and a temporary protection order against the NTF-ELCAC, the 70th Infantry Battalion of the Armed Forces of the Philippines, and members of the Philippine National Police Bataan related to the abduction of Jonila Castro and Jhed Tamano. The protection order bans the NTF-ELCAC from coming within 1 kilometer from Castro and Tamano and their place of work or residence.

== Calls to defund or abolish ==
In 2021, some Philippine senators suggested to defund the NTF-ELCAC in response to Parlade's red-tagging of community pantries during the COVID-19 pandemic; Parlade later called the senate proponents "stupid", for which he was censured by at least 15 senators. Presidential candidate and labor leader Leody de Guzman also called for the abolition of the NTF-ELCAC if he were elected. Presidential candidate Leni Robredo stated that she wanted the NTF-ELCAC abolished.

During a protest rally held in January 2023, labor groups led by Women Workers United called for the abolition of the NTF-ELCAC and the repeal of Executive Order 70 and the Anti-Terror Law. The labor groups also called for the release of disappeared and jailed labor leaders.

In November 2023, the United Nations Special Rapporteur (UNSR) on the promotion and protection of human rights in the context of climate change Ian Fry called for the abolition of the NTF-ELCAC and the repeal of the Philippine Anti-Terror Law. Fry said that the NTF-ELCAC's red-tagging of environmental human rights defenders and Indigenous peoples violates the rights to life and free expression. Council of Leaders for Peace Initiatives and other peace advocacy groups supported the call to abolish the NTF-ELCAC, while the NTF-ELCAC vice chair Eduardo Año rejected the call deeming the UNSCR report "incomplete" inviting the UNSR to have "clarificatory engagement" with the NTF-ELCAC.

In January 2024, the Concerned Artists of the Philippines called for a review of the Anti-Terror Law and the abolition of the NTF-ELCAC to address red-tagging, vilification, and harassment suits.

The United Nations Special Rapporteur on Freedom of Expression and Opinion Irene Khan, during her visit to the Philippines in February 2024, called on the government to abolish the NTF-ELCAC, which she said had red-tagged human rights and humanitarian workers, teachers and health professionals, youth leaders, church leaders, and Indigenous rights defenders. In response, National Security Council Assistant Director General and spokesperson Jonathan Malaya rejected the recommendation, saying the "NTF-ELCAC has been the game-changer in the government's fight against communist terrorism". Khan in June 2025 reiterated her call to abolish the NTF-ELCAC, considering how the NTF-ELCAC harms human rights and freedom of expression.

Former senator Leila de Lima said that the government should have disbanded the NTF-ELCAC after Duterte's term as president ended. De Lima posted on X, "Duterte's NTF-ELCAC is a threat to human rights & free speech. Tadtad na nga ng anomalya, hindi pa tumitigil sa paghahasik ng lagim at pagbabanta dahil kung sino-sino ang nire-red tag at inaakusahang komunista (Duterte's NTF-ELCAC is a threat to human rights and free speech. Despite numerous anomalies, it continues to sow terror by engaging in red-tagging and accusing various individuals of being communists.)".

In April 2024, human rights organization Amnesty International called for the NTF-ELCAC's abolition, citing the need to end red-tagging and the alleged abuse of the Anti-Terror Law, which Amnesty International said are being used to link media and human rights workers to the communist insurgency.

After the Supreme Court ruled in May 2024 that red-tagging threatens a person's right to life, liberty, or security, Human Rights Watch and Karapatan called on President Bongbong Marcos to abolish the NTF-ELCAC. Marcos rejected the calls for abolition, saying the task force was instrumental in reducing the country's internal security threat. Peasant activist Danilo Ramos of Kilusang Magbubukid ng Pilipinas condemned attacks against famers and called for the abolition of the NTF-ELCAC.

After the arrest of Rodrigo Duterte in March 2025, protesters outside of the Philippines called for the abolition of the NTF-ELCAC and the repeal of the Anti-Terror Law, and urged the government to stop extrajudicial killings in the Philippines. Congress Representative Arlene Brosas said, "Now is the perfect time for President Marcos to prove his commitment to human rights by dismantling one of the most oppressive state apparatuses created under the Duterte regime". She said the NTF-ELCAC has never been a tool for peace, having harassed and red-tagged activists and putting lives at risk.

The Center for Trade Union and Human Rights in October 2025 called for the abolition of the NTF-ELCAC, citing the task force's red-tagging of unionists and workers.

In December 2025, youth and church organizations called for the abolition of the NTF-ELCAC and the scrapping of its confidential and intelligence funds. The College Editors Guild of the Philippines said that the NTF-ELCAC endangers student journalists and youth activists by its systematic red-tagging in Philippine schools. Amid the flood control projects scandal in the Philippines, Manindigan called for an investigation into the task force's use of its intelligence funds. Karapatan said that the NTF-ELCAC's proposed 2026 budget worth ₱8 billion is "not only a waste of the people’s money, but money used to fund repression".

== Censorship and disinformation ==
The NTF-ELCAC and other government agencies have used their platforms to target members of the mass media. In 2020, the NTF-ELCAC Facebook page posted a series of infographics that incorrectly said that ABS-CBN Broadcasting was shut down because "they have issues with the law." Facebooks pages of the Presidential Communications Operations Office and Radio Television Malacañang shared NTF-ELCAC's posts pertaining to ABS-CBN's franchise. Journalists, academics, and media groups condemned NTF-ELCAC and described the post as a "black propaganda offensive" and an abuse of authority that endangers ABS-CBN's workforce.

In August 2022, the NTF-ELCAC, through the Commission on Higher Education, ordered the removal of "subversive" books from school libraries in the Cordillera region. The allegedly subversive materials included books about peace negotiations in the Philippines. The book banning was criticized by student organizations, such as UP Rises Against Tyranny and Dictatorship, mass media organizations, human rights groups, peace advocates, teachers, and librarians. Students and human rights groups called the book banning a "brazen attack on academic freedom".

The help protect press freedom in the Philippines, the Center for Media Freedom and Responsibility recommended penalties for red-tagging by the NTF-ELCAC and the dismantling of the government's red-tagging apparatus.
