= Gemma Narisma =

Climate scientist (1972–2021)

Gemma Teresa Narisma
- Born: April 12, 1972
- Died: March 5, 2021 (aged 48)
- Education: University of the Philippines Diliman (BS, MSc), Macquarie University in Sydney (PhD)
- Occupation: Climate scientist
- Employer(s): Manila Observatory, Ateneo de Manila University
- Notable work: Chapter Atlas - IPCC Sixth Assessment Report

Gemma Teresa Narisma (April 12, 1972 – March 5, 2021) was a Filipina researcher who served as the executive director of the Manila Observatory in the Philippines and Head of the Regional Climate Systems programme from 2017 to 2021. Narisma was also an associate professor of the Physics Department at the Ateneo de Manila University. She was an author of IPCC Sixth Assessment Report Working Group I.

== Research ==
Narisma obtained a BS in applied physics and an MSc in environmental science from the University of the Philippines Diliman. She then completed a doctoral degree in atmospheric science at the Macquarie University in Sydney in Australia, and went on to become a research associate at the Center for Sustainability and the Global Environment (SAGE) at the University of Wisconsin-Madison

Narisma's research included climate change, regional climate modeling and land-atmosphere interactions. Her work sought to improve the resilience of the Philippines in relation to climate change, through improved weather forecasting. She was the Philippine lead for the Cloud, Aerosol, and Monsoon Processes Philippines Experiment (CAMP2Ex), which was investigating the impact of fires and pollution on clouds to improve climate forecasts. During this project, Narisma contributed to the formation of young scientists from the Philippines in climate sciences.

Her work in climate science was recognised through the award of National Academy of Science and Technology Outstanding Young Scientist in Atmospheric Science (2012). Narisma was recognised as one of ten outstanding women scientists in the Philippines by TOWNS (The Outstanding Women in the Nation’s Service) in 2013, and received National Research Council of the Philippines (NRCP) Achievement Award in Earth and Space Sciences in 2018.

Narisma was part of the working group responsible for the Philippine Climate Change Assessment Report (PhilCCA), which received a Special Citation Award from the National Academy of Science and Technology (NAST) in the Philippines. Narisma contributed to Working Group I of the IPCC Sixth Assessment Report, and they dedicated the AR6 Working Group I Atlas to her memory.

== Selected publications ==
=== Journals ===
- Supari, Fredolin Tangang, Liew Juneng, Faye Cruz, Jing Xiang Chung, Sheau Tieh Ngai, Ester Salimun, Mohd Syazwan Faisal Mohd, Jerasorn Santisirisomboon, Patama Singhruck, Tan PhanVan, Thanh Ngo-Duc, Gemma Narisma, Edvin Aldrian, Dodo Gunawan, Ardhasena Sopaheluwakan. 2020. Multi-model projections of precipitation extremes in Southeast Asia based on CORDEX-Southeast Asia simulations. Environmental Research; 184. doi:10.1016/j.envres.2020.109350, 10.1016/j.envres.2020.109350
- Angeli Silang, Sherdon Niño Uy, Julie Mae Dado, Faye Abigail Cruz, Gemma Narisma, Nathaniel Libatique, Gregory Tangonan. 2014. Wind Energy Projection for the Philippines based on Climate Change Modeling. Energy Procedia; 52: 26-37. doi:10.1016/j.egypro.2014.07.051, 10.1016/j.egypro.2014.07.051
- F. T. Cruz, G. T. Narisma, M.Q. Villafuerte II, K.U. Cheng Chua, and L.M. Olaguera. 2013. A climatological analysis of the southwest monsoon rainfall in the Philippines. Atmospheric Research; 122: 609-616. doi:10.1016/j.atmosres.2012.06.010, 10.1016/j.atmosres.2012.06.010
- Paul C. West, Gemma T. Narisma, Carol C. Barford, Christopher J. Kucharik, Jonathan A. Foley. 2010. An alternative approach for quantifying climate regulation by ecosystems. Frontiers in Ecology and the Environment; 9(2): 126–133. doi:10.1890/090015, 10.1890/090015
- Gemma T. Narisma, Jonathan A. Foley, Rachel Licker, Navin Ramankutty. 2007. Abrupt changes in rainfall during the twentieth century. Geophysical Research Letters; 34. doi:10.1029/2006GL028628, 10.1029/2006GL028628

=== Reports ===
- Gutiérrez, J. M., R. G. Jones, G. T. Narisma, L. M. Alves, M. Amjad, I. V. Gorodetskaya, M. Grose, N. A. B. Klutse, S. Krakovska, J. Li, D. Martínez-Castro, L. O. Mearns, S. H. Mernild, T. Ngo-Duc, B. van den Hurk, J-H. Yoon. 2021. Atlas. In: Climate Change 2021: The Physical Science Basis. Contribution of Working Group I to the Sixth Assessment Report of the Intergovernmental Panel on Climate Change [Masson-Delmotte, V., P. Zhai, A. Pirani, S. L. Connors, C. Péan, S. Berger, N. Caud, Y. Chen, L. Goldfarb, M. I. Gomis, M. Huang, K. Leitzell, E. Lonnoy, J. B. R. Matthews, T. K. Maycock, T. Waterfield, O. Yelekçi, R. Yu and B. Zhou (eds.)]. Cambridge University Press.
- Villarin, J. T., Algo, J. L., Cinco, T. A., Cruz, F. T., de Guzman, R. G., Hilario, F. D., Narisma, G. T., Ortiz, A. M., Siringan, F. P., Tibig, L. V. 2016. Philippine Climate Change Assessment (PhilCCA): The Physical Science Basis. The Oscar M. Lopez Center for Climate Change Adaptation and Disaster Risk Management Foundation Inc. and Climate Change Commission. PUBLISHED BY: The Oscar M. Lopez Center for Climate Change Adaptation and Disaster Risk Management Foundation Inc. ISSN 2508-089X.

=== Books ===
- Gemma Teresa T. Narisma, May Celine T.M. Vicente, Emmi B. Capili-Tarroja, Faye Abigail T. Cruz, Rosa T. Perez, Raul S. Dayawon, Julie Mae B. Dado, Ma. Flordeliza P. Del Castillo, Marcelino Q. Villafuerte II, Leonard Christian G. Loo, Deanna Marie P. Olaguer, Ma. Antonia Y. Loyzaga, Ma. Regina N. Banaticla-Altamirano, Lawrence T. Ramos, Christine Marie D. Habito, Rodel D. Lasco. 2011. Patterns of Vulnerability in the Forestry, Agriculture, Water, and Coastal Sectors of Silago, Southern Leyte, Philippines. Publisher: Manila Observatory. ISBN 978-971-94565-1-3.

=== Book chapters ===
- Beltrán-Przekurat, A., R.A. Pielke Sr., J.L Eastman, G.T. Narisma, A.J. Pitman, M. Lei, and D. Niyogi. 2011. Using the Factor Separation Method for land-use land-cover change impacts on weather and climate process with the Regional Atmospheric Modeling System. In: The Factor Separation Method in the Atmosphere-Applications and Future Prospects. Cambridge University Press. ISBN 978-0-521-19173-9. doi:10.1017/CBO9780511921414.008, 10.1017/CBO9780511921414.008

== Personal life ==
Narisma was featured in the children's book Beyond the Storm, which explores her work on climate projections; the book is part of a women in science series.

Narisma died on March 5, 2021, at the age of 49.
