= Gay Jane Perez =

Filipino environmental scientist

2nd Director General Philippine Space Agency
- Ad interim
- Assumed office January 22, 2026
- President: Bongbong Marcos
- Preceded by: Joel Marciano Jr.

Personal details
- Education: University of the Philippines Diliman (BS, MS, PhD)

Gay Jane P. Perez is a Filipino physicist and environmental scientist who has served as the Director General of the Philippine Space Agency on an ad interim basis since 2026 under President Bongbong Marcos.

Prior to her work at PhilSA, Perez was known for research involving satellite observation of environmental conditions, and the applications of that data in agricultural planning. She also serves a professor in the Institute of Environmental Science and Meteorology at the University of the Philippines Diliman

== Education and career ==
Perez is originally from Naga, Camarines Sur, where she attended a Catholic girls' school. She studied physics at the University of the Philippines Diliman, earning a bachelor's degree in 2003, a master's degree in 2005, and a Ph.D. in 2009. She went to the US in 2010–2011 for postdoctoral research at the Hydrospheric and Biospheric Sciences Laboratory of the NASA Goddard Space Flight Center, working there on remote sensing.

Returning to the Philippines, she became the leader of the team that produced Diwata-1, the first microsatellite constructed in the Philippines. Her team also produced two later satellites, Maya-1 and Diwata-2, launched respectively in 2016, 2018, and 2019.

In 2022, she was elected to a four-year term as president of the Technical Commission on Education and Outreach of the International Society for Photogrammetry and Remote Sensing, the first Filipino to lead the commission.

In 2025, Perez became OIC Director General at Philippine Space Agency In 2026, she was appointed by President Ferdinand R. Marcos, Jr. as the Agency's Director General.

== Awards and Honors ==
Perez won the 2018 ASEAN-US Science Prize for Women, becoming the first Filipino to do so. In 2019, she was both an awardee of The Outstanding Women in the Nation's Service and the Asian Scientist 100 by the Asian Scientist. The National Academy of Science and Technology named her as their 2021 NAST Outstanding Young Scientist for Physical Sciences. In 2026 she was selected as Karman Project Fellow for her work.
