= Lilian Pateña =

Filipino scientist

Lilian Formalejo Pateña (born September 16, 1953) is a Filipino scientist who discovered a breed of calamansi and seedless pomelo and discovered micropropagation which established the banana industry in the Philippines. She is also an inventor of leaf-bud cutting in cassava. She was recognized as one of The Outstanding Women in the Nation's Service (TOWNS) in 1998, Women of Distinction for Science and Technology in 1995, and Outstanding Young Scientist in 1990.

Pateña is also a member of the Orchid Specialist Group.
