= Lorraine Badoy-Partosa =

Filipino physician and government official

Spokesperson of National Task Force to End Local Communist Armed Conflict
- In office 2020–2022
- Preceded by: Position established
- Succeeded by: Clarita Carlos

Personal details
- Born: Lorraine Marie Tablang Badoy; June 2, 1962 (age 64) Manila, Philippines
- Relations: Gang Badoy (half-sister); Ludovico Badoy (uncle)
- Occupation: Doctor, government official

Lorraine Marie Tablang Badoy-Partosa, better known as Lorraine Badoy and sometimes also called Lorraine Partosa, is a Filipino physician, government official, and political figure best known for having been one of the spokespersons of the National Task Force to End Local Communist Armed Conflict, and for being involved in various controversies relating to the practice of red-tagging in the Philippines.

Badoy-Partosa was also Undersecretary of the Presidential Communications Operations Office (PCOO) and Assistant Secretary of the Department of Social Welfare and Development. She is the half-sister of advocacy leader and educator Gang Badoy and the niece of former Cotabato City Mayor Ludovico Badoy.

Prior to her appointment to government, Badoy-Partosa was a supporter of President Rodrigo Duterte during his campaign.

== Legal cases ==
Civil complaints seeking ₱2 million in damages have been filed against Badoy-Partosa by activist Carol Araullo and separately, by her son, journalist Atom Araullo, due to Badoy-Partosa's repeated public red-tagging of them. Atom Araullo chose not to file libel charges against Badoy-Partosa, as he opposes the criminalization of libel, which is often used to harass legitimate media in the Philippines. In December 2024, the Quezon City Regional Trial Court promulgated a ₱2-million fine against Badoy-Partosa and Jeffrey "Ka Eric" Celiz for red-baiting Atom Araullo.

On February 29, 2024, the Supreme Court of the Philippines fined Badoy ₱30,000 for indirect contempt of court per publication of vitriolic statements and outright threats. She was convicted of online red-tagging Manila RTC, Branch 19 Judge Marlo A. Magdoza-Malagar calling him an "idiot judge" who lawyered for the CPP-NPA.
