= Aura Matias =

Filipino industrial engineer

Aura C. Matias (born 11 September 1960) is a Filipino industrial engineer. Her academic research concerns ergonomics and human–computer interaction; she has also applied her expertise in industrial engineering to issues in the society of the Philippines including the quality of water services, and corruption in government agencies. She is a professor of industrial engineering and operations research at the University of the Philippines Diliman, where she is the former dean of engineering and former executive director of the National Engineering Center.

== Education and career ==
Matias was a student at the University of the Philippines Diliman, where she earned a bachelor's degree in industrial engineering in 1982 and a master's degree in 1989. She went to Purdue University in the US for doctoral study in industrial engineering, completing her Ph.D. there in 1996. Her research there, conducted with Gavriel Salvendy, involved the development of a model for predicting carpal tunnel syndrome based on data collected from 100 women who used computer keyboards.

In 1998, she became one of the founders of the Philippine Institute of Industrial Engineers. In 2003 she helped found the Philippine Ergonomics Society.

As a faculty member at the University of the Philippines Diliman, she chaired the department of industrial engineering and operations research from 2004 to 2010. After two terms as dean of engineering, she stepped down as dean in 2016, returning to a regular faculty position.

== Recognition ==
Matias was an awardee of The Outstanding Women in the Nation's Service for 2004. She is a member of the National Academy of Science and Technology, elected in 2011.
