= Abduction of Dyan Gumanao and Armand Dayoha =

2023 abduction in Cebu City, Philippines

On January 10, 2023, Filipino activist and development worker couple Dyan Gumanao and Armand Dayoha were abducted at the Port of Cebu, Cebu City in broad daylight after coming from Mindanao. They surfaced on January 15 and were fetched by loved ones the day after and told the press the torture and other ordeals they experienced under state forces pointed out to be members of the Philippine National Police (PNP) and the Armed Forces of the Philippines (AFP). Before their release, a video was captured regarding their abduction and went viral on social media.

== Background ==
April Dyan Palua Gumanao (28 at the time of abduction) and Armand Dayoha (27 at the time of abduction) were activists who both graduated from University of the Philippines Cebu. Gumanao was a Mass Communication cum laude graduate who was working with the Community Empowerment Resource Network, Inc. (CERNET) and a regional coordinator of ACT Teachers Partylist. Dayoha then, after finishing BA Psychology, was a fourth year student taking up BA Fine Arts also in UP Cebu. He has also worked in Visayas Human Development Agency (VIHDA) and in UP Cebu teaching National Service Training Program where he is also a unionist.

Protesting against the then-Anti-Terrorism Bill of 2020, Gumanao was one of the eight activists who were detained by the PNP after they were arrested inside the UP Cebu grounds on the pretense that they were violating COVID-19 health protocols. In January 2021, Gumanao and Dayoha were tailed by unidentified and uniformed state forces after a protest commemorating the 1987 Mendiola Massacre. Days before their capture, on December 10, 2022, they were also followed by unidentified persons after joining a mobilization commemorating International Human Rights Day.

== Abduction ==
Coming from Christmas vacation, the couple were returning to Cebu City from the Port of Cagayan de Oro after informing the parents of Gumanao of their plans to get married by May 2023. While embarking, a man from behind called their names and told "police kami" (transl. we are police). They were pushed to a more private area of the docks towards a silver vehicle. They shouted for help and Gumanao screamed "aktibista kami" (transl. we are activists). There were witnesses, including security personnel of the port, but they were not given help. The couple were brought to an undisclosed location by Pier 6.

A video of the abduction was captured by an onlooker and went viral on social media. The clip showed that the couple were shouting for help, but no one intervened.

The couple, blindfolded and tied, felt the vehicle boarded onto a ship and also felt that through clues, believed to have reached Negros Occidental by ferry at one point. The captors said that other units of state forces were also targeting them and they wanted them to surrender as "communists rebels" and become intelligence assets. Apart from being dealt with psychological and emotional torture, they were also threatened of execution. They were afraid that they would become part of the long list of victims of extrajudicial killings in the Philippines.

During these times, activists and other concerned individuals mounted campaigns and protests to pressure authorities to surface the two. The Makabayan Bloc representatives from ACT Teachers, GABRIELA, and Kabataan Partylists sounded the alarm, reminiscing the horror of massive and state-sponsored enforced disappearances during the martial law of former President Ferdinand Marcos Sr. where about 1,600 have gone missing for fighting for democratic rights.

On January 15, they were brought to a rural place north of Cebu City where they were eventually released. The couple were able to stay in a resort in Carmen, Cebu where they were fetched eventually by loved ones and colleagues the next day.

== Aftermath ==
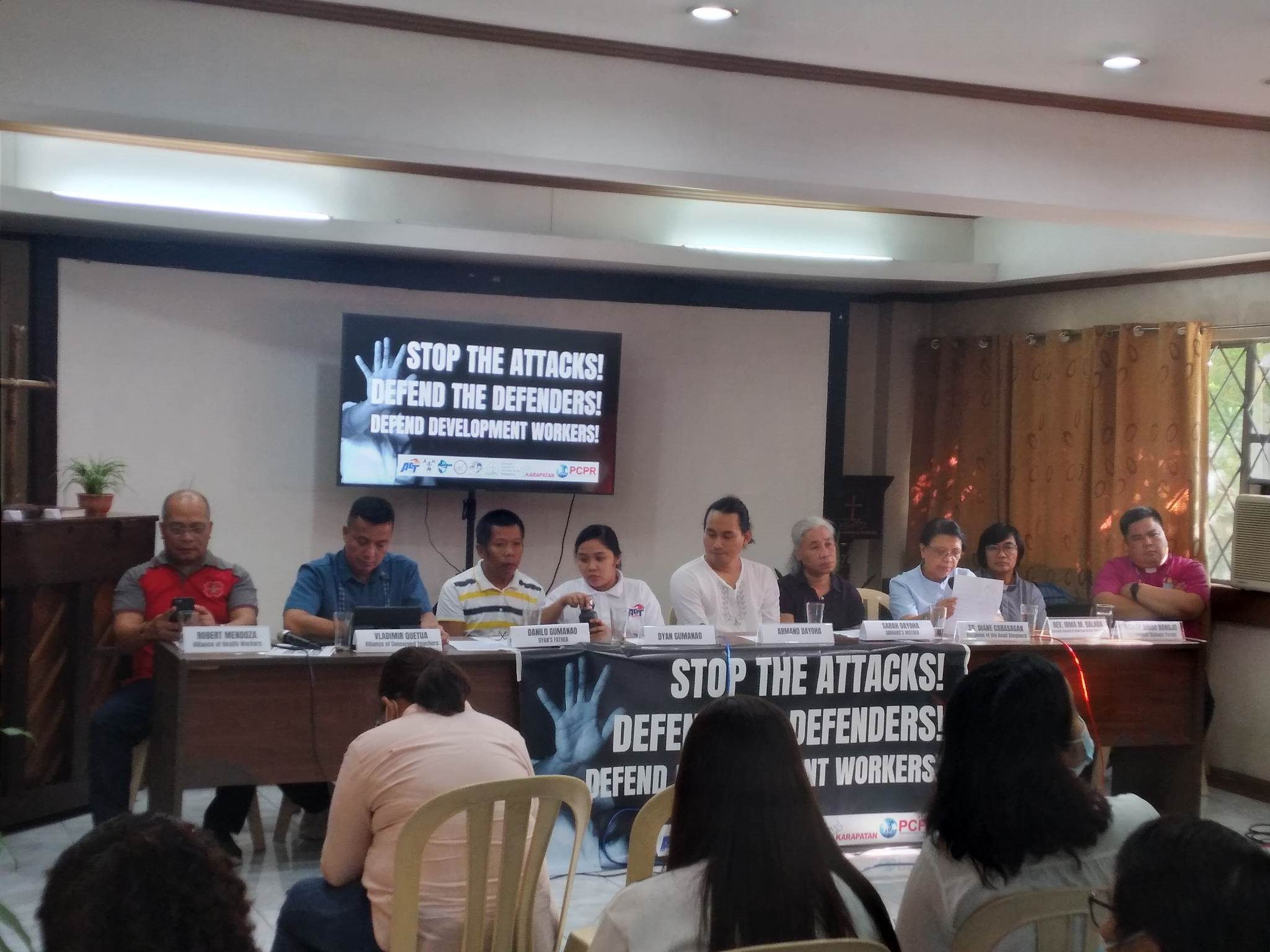
Press conference in Quezon City, January 26, 2023.

In a press conference at the UP Cebu on January 21, the couple narrated their ordeal. Dayoha questioned the police on why they did not showed up to the police for a probe, saying they their loved ones were contacting them, but in vain, aside from the fact that their captors introduced themselves as policemen. He addressed the PNP as well as the City and Provincial Government if Cebu is really safe when an abduction happened in broad daylight and during Sinulog. Gumanao voiced out how fighting for the rights of laborers, including those of teachers have become dangerous in the Philippines. The police denied any involvement.

Gumanao presented herself as a witness of the situation of human rights in the Philippines in front of the United Nations Human Rights Council in Geneva, Switzerland on March and September 2023. She said that the abduction of Jonila Castro and Jhed Tamano on September 2, 2023, were reminiscent of their experiences, but she lauded the two girls for standing up and telling the truth.

The Commission on Human Rights was able to trace a motorcycle and person involved belonging to the Intelligence Service of the AFP (ISAFP).

== See also ==
- Abduction of Jonila Castro and Jhed Tamano
- Enforced disappearances in the Philippines
