= Ludovico Badoy =

Filipino politician (1951–2021)

The Honorable Ludovico D. Badoy
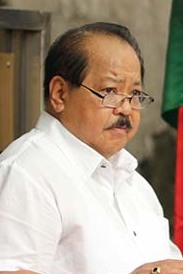

Executive Director of the National Historical Commission of the Philippines
- In office April 2002 – February 2020
- President: Gloria Macapagal Arroyo; Benigno Aquino III; Rodrigo Duterte
- Preceded by: Danilo S. Manalang
- Succeeded by: Restituto L. Aguilar

Mayor of Cotabato City
- In office March 30, 1986 – June 30, 1998
- Preceded by: Juan J. Ty
- Succeeded by: Muslimin Sema

Personal details
- Born: September 19, 1951 Cotabato, Cotabato, Philippines
- Died: April 18, 2021 (aged 69) Caloocan, Philippines
- Party: Kilusan para sa Pambansang Pagpapanibago (1998)
- Spouse: Dachelyn Yap (m. 2013)
- Education: San Beda College
- Occupation: Politician, Civil Servant

Ludovico Deles Badoy (September 19, 1951 – April 18, 2021) was a Filipino politician who served as executive director of the National Historical Commission of the Philippines (NHCP) from 2002 to 2020. He previously served as the mayor of Cotabato City from 1986 to 1998.

== Biography ==
Badoy entered politics in 1986 when he was the appointed officer-in-charge of Cotabato City following the 1986 People Power Revolution. For 12 years, he served as the city's mayor until his resignation in 1998 to run for the Senate. He placed 36th in the 1998 Senate election earning only 388,465 votes or 1.3% of the total votes cast.

In 2002, he was appointed by President Gloria Macapagal Arroyo to be the executive director of the then-National Historical Institute. He was reappointed to the post by President Benigno Aquino III in December 2010. Historian Benito J. Legarda criticized Badoy's reappointment in a column published in the Philippine Daily Inquirer saying it was a "slap in the face of the government career service" and that Badoy "lacks the academic and career credentials for a historical agency". In 2015, there were calls for Badoy's resignation due in part to the Torre de Manila controversy. Badoy retired from the agency in 2020. During his term, he was credited with modernizing historical sites and museums under his office and for the successful commemorations of the birth sesquicentenaries of Jose Rizal, Andres Bonifacio, Apolinario Mabini, and Emilio Aguinaldo. His term also saw the restoration and reconstruction of heritage churches destroyed during the 2013 Bohol earthquake and Typhoon Haiyan which was partially funded by the NHCP.

Badoy was the younger brother of Anacleto Badoy, a former commissioner of the Commission on Elections and justice of the Sandiganbayan. He is also the uncle of Presidential Communications Operation Office Undersecretary Lorraine Badoy and journalist Edwin Cordevilla.

He died on April 18, 2021, after suffering from pneumonia. He previously tested positive for COVID-19 on April 14.
