= Maginhawa Art and Food Hub =

Maginhawa
- Tourism district
- Maginhawa Art and Food Hub
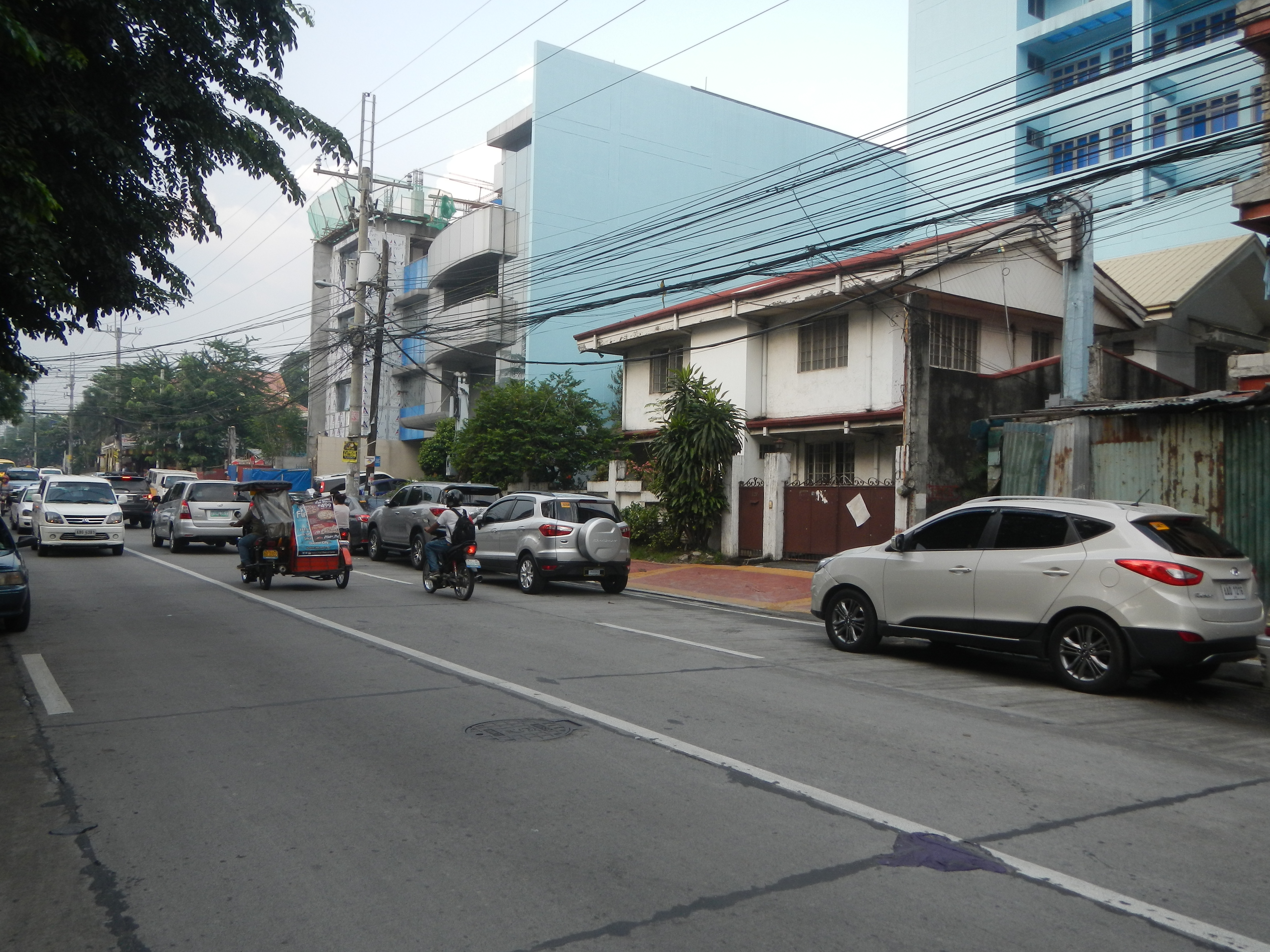
- Etymology: Maginhawa Street
- Country: Philippines
- City: Quezon City
- Region: National Capital Region
- Barangays: UP. Village, Teacher's Village West, Teacher's Village East, Malaya, Sikatuna
- Roads: Maginhawa; V. Luna Extension; Malingap; Magiting; Mayaman
- Creation ordinance: 2015

Dimensions
  - Length: 2.2 km (1.4 mi)

The Maginhawa Art and Food Hub, also known as the Maginhawa Food Area, is a 2.2-kilometer-long (1.4 mi) food tourism hub in Quezon City, Metro Manila, Philippines.

== History ==
The history of Maginhawa Street in Quezon City, Metro Manila as a food tourism hub can be traced as early as the year 2010.

As per the 2012 Quezon City Comprehensive Land Use Plan, Maginhawa is classified as a minor commercial zone. The UP Teacher's Village area, the broader area is a medium-density residential zone. The Quezon City Food Festival, the first ever food festival in the vicinity was organized in 2014.

In 2015, Maginhawa along V. Luna Extension and the adjacent Malingap and Magiting streets were declared a tourism district of Quezon City with the name "Maginhawa Art and Food Hub" via Ordinance No. 2439. The ordinance also institutionalized the Maginhawa Arts and Food Festival is held every first Saturday of December annually.

The hub was expanded in 2017 via Ordinance 2559 adding Mayaman street. The hub in total covers 2.2-kilometer-long (1.4 mi)

In 2024, volunteers from different organizations initiated a tactical urbanism project on a 250-meter (820 ft) segment of Maginhawa Street, with support from the city's traffic and police departments. The project involved converting one lane into a shared-use path, another into a public space, and implementing a temporary one-way traffic scheme on the remaining lanes. The project is set to run from November 2024 through February 2025.

The hub serves the nearby University of the Philippines Diliman campus.
