= Gang Badoy =

Filipino radio personality

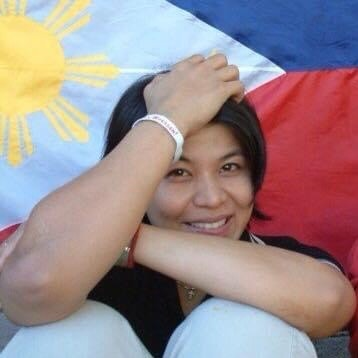
- Badoy circa 2005
- Born: Therese Tianco Badoy
- Education: University of the Philippines Diliman
- Occupations: rock music events organizer, radio and television personality, writer, businesswoman, political advocate
- Organization: Rock Ed Philippines
- Known for: alternative educator, founder of Rock Ed Philippines
- Television: The Brew (ABS-CBN News Channel)
- Title: Executive Director, Rock Ed Philippines
- Term: 2005-2010
- Successor: Pepe Diokno
- Spouse: Jay Capati
- Awards: 2010 The Outstanding Women in the Nation's Service; 2010 Ten Outstanding Young Men of the Philippines
- Website: http://www.rockedphilippines.org

Therese "Gang" Tianco Badoy-Capati is a radio and television host, feature writer, businesswoman, and educator from the Philippines, best known for founding RockEd Philippines, an advocacy and alternative education group that continues to showcase social issues through music events featuring voluntary performing artists and rock bands, and its radio talk show, RockEd Radio on the now defunct NU 107. Rock Ed Radio returned to the airwaves since January 2012 over Jam 88.3.

In November 2010 she was presented with an award by Philippine President Benigno Aquino III as one of The Outstanding Women in the Nation's Service (TOWNS) for that year. Badoy was also given the Ten Outstanding Young Men or TOYM Award making her the only Filipino to win both prestigious awards on the same year. (2010)

== Early life and education ==
Therese Badoy was born the youngest of ten children born to Justice Anacleto Badoy and English Literature teacher Pura Tianco.

She went to St. Scholastica's College, Manila for grade school, and then to Assumption College for high school. She describes her younger self as “an inattentive, irreverent student" who was curious about the world around her but found that classroom education bored her.

She wanted to take Education and/or Industrial Engineering at the University of the Philippines Diliman, but ended up studying Art History there. Badoy was a member of the Philippine Youth Team of Volleyball as well as the University of the Philippines Volleyball Varsity.

Throughout her studies, she found that rock music was a more fulfilling way of learning about the world. She cites the Beatles’ song ‘Blackbird’ for having taught her about apartheid, and first learned about desaparecidos from Sting’s ‘They Dance Alone,’ which was written for the widows of Chile. U2 and their front man Bono served as another influence, with their lyrics full of protest and spirituality.

== Early Media Career ==
Badoy's first media job was with ABS-CBN, doing a series of interviews for the 1998 Philippine Centennial. The idea was to interview a hundred Filipinos working in America, and Badoy found the work exciting for the first few interviews, which were all success stories. Eventually, Badoy became more interested in profiling ordinary Filipinos struggling to survive in the US.

After a period of moving from job to job, Badoy eventually interned then joined WTHR-NBC's Eyewitness News in Indianapolis, stayed for a couple of years then moved back to California to become assistant director of the Missions Office in the Diocese of San Jose.

== Return to the Philippines ==
Badoy decided to return to the Philippines, and quickly became active in the protest movements that arose in the wake of the Hello Garci scandal. One of the ideas she proposed was to hold small rallies in schools. In order to make these rallies interesting to students, Badoy returned to her roots, used her connections with musician friends, and took advantage of a tool for making issues more interesting: rock and roll.

== Rock Ed Philippines ==
In July 2005, Rock Ed Philippines was born, conceived by Badoy as a 10-year program to “rock society through alternative education with the help of celebrities, musicians, poets, artists, entrepreneurs, writers, et al.", and directing the passions of the youth towards seeing the Philippines meet the UN vision of development as expressed in the Millennium Development Goals.

The early, awareness-building stages of the program focused on bringing the youth together through music. At the center of the effort was Rock Ed Radio, a weekly radio program on NU 107, anchored by Badoy and by poet Lourd de Veyra. (The show later moved briefly to another station, Jam 88.3, and then it returned to NU 107 until its last broadcast on November 4, 2010.) Rock Ed also put up awareness-building concerts, including some in unusual public places, such as "Rock the Rehas," held at the New Bilibid Prison, and "Rock the Riles," held at a MRT-3 station.

Badoy's participation in Rock Ed turned her into a cultural icon among the young Filipinos who were the target of Rock Ed.

Her blogs and her Twitter account have a strong following, National Geographic Channel Asia selected her among several other Filipino personalities to become their "Live Curious" ambassadors, aiming to inspire people to question way they see the world., she became one of three hosts on ABS-CBN News Channel's talk show "The Brew", and she was hailed as one of The Outstanding Women in the Nation's Service (TOWNS) for 2010.

=== The Typhoon Ondoy Broadcasts and Typhoon Pepeng Relief ===
Badoy is often noted as a hero for her actions during Typhoon Ondoy. Badoy took it upon herself to turn radio station Jam 88.3, which was hosting Rock Ed Radio at the time, into a venue for coordinating information about the situation in Metro Manila The station had at first shifted to pre-recorded programming while its staff were unable to get to the station during the storm, but Badoy went to the station and insisted that it would be more useful for the station to do what it can to keep people connected and informed. Badoy insists to always include Lambert Cruz (a Jam 88.3 jock) in the narration of this story. After a few hours, several other friends and volunteers joined them to assist in taking the urgent and numerous messages sent in by the many people stranded by the typhoon. Badoy believed that during the storm there's a high probability that only cell phones will have literal power and cell phones only have radios that connect to FM radio. So instead of keeping the news info confined to AM airwaves, she took it upon herself to say FM radio should be directly involved in civic action, for once. "It just made sense." Is how she explains that revolutionary call she made during the first hours of Typhoon Ondoy.

Announcing her intent on the Rock Ed Radio Twitter account, Badoy said:

"On air now on Jam 88.3. Tweet us @rockedradio or post msg here if u want us to announce anything on air. Tell ur parents u're okay or inquire abt them. Call. Text us areas where u need assistance, we can call local officials, konsehals to your area,"

She went on board for eight straight days, eventually joined by the other DJs of the station, spending 14 to 16 hours each day.

On September 29, 2009, Closing her third day during the Ondoy broadcasts, Badoy tweeted:

"What an honor to be given the chance to give out crucial info at a crucial time."

When it became apparent that the Department of Social Welfare and Development needed more manpower so that relief goods could be distributed more quickly, Badoy quickly volunteered the services of Rock Ed members to help in the tagging and distribution of relief goods.

When, not long after Typhoon Ondoy hit Metro Manila, Typhoon Pepeng in turn hit Northern Luzon, Badoy quickly jumped into action yet again, this time leading Rock Ed volunteers in distributing thousands of relief packs donated by the many people who responded to Rock Ed's call for donations. These packs were delivered to Dagupan, Pangasinan and Baguio, the Rock Ed van driving through makeshift bridges and roads partly eroded by recent landslides.

=== Recognition ===
In recognition of her work in Rock Ed, Badoy was recognized with The Outstanding Women in the Nation's Service (TOWNS) for that 2010. The award was presented to her at Malacañan Palace on November 5, 2010, by Philippine President Benigno Aquino III.

The citation for Badoy said that:

"By nurturing volunteerism, she reached out to the youth to empower them and move them to participate in empowering others to uphold their rights to better society."

On December 13, 2010, Badoy was also honored as one of the Philippines' Ten Outstanding Young Men (TOYM) in an awarding ceremony, also held in Malacañan Palace.

Badoy is not comfortable talking about her awards, despite the recognition, noting that:

"The awards are irrelevant, but they become relevant because they're a great chance to say 'Thank you' to the many people who supported you in your work. It's also a 'thank you' that my parents will understand."

Philippine Star journalist Jansen Musico describes her reactions to the honors she has received:

At the slightest mention of her awards, she cringed and laughed. That quickly turned into an aghast "Really? No way!" when she heard about the Wikipedia page devoted to her.

=== Turnover of Rock Ed Philippines directorship ===
As part of the plan for the next phase of Rock Ed over the post of executive director of Rock Ed Philippines in 2010. Independent Filmmaker Pepe Diokno would take over the executive post, while Badoy and her husband Jay Capati have organized an events management business called Samarami Asia to help keep Rock Ed funded. She announced the turnover on the very last episode of Rock Ed Radio on NU 107, on November 4, 2010 (the station would be re-formatted into Win 107 three days later), noting that she knew Rock Ed Philippines was in good hands. In August 2013, Badoy joined change.org as the interim Communications Director in the Philippines and stayed with change.org until December 2013.

== Project: Steady Asia ==
In 2018, Badoy started Project: Steady Asia, an inter-disciplinary well-being program and guided creative therapy program for teenagers and adults. Art, music, and creative writing, and stress-reduction sessions consist part of the program to manage post-traumatic stress disorder and trauma-informed wellness plans. It is also the mental health program that takes care of athletes via the Philippine Olympic Committee Athletes’ Commission.

== Personal life ==
In March 2010, Gang Badoy married Filipino-American Jay Capati.

== See also ==
- NU 107
- Lourd de Veyra
