= Ibalik ang Philippine History sa High School Movement =

Ibalik ang Philippines History sa High School Movement
- Formation: Circa 2015
- Type: Education reform movement
- Legal status: Loose movement of various organizations
- Purpose: To return Philippine History as a dedicated Social Studies subject in the Philippine high school curriculum
- Location: Philippines
- Key people: Benjo Basas; Cristina Cristobal; Jamaico Ignacio; Antonio Calipjo Go
- Affiliations: Ibalik ang Philippine History sa High School Movement (Online Group); Philippine Historical Association; Teacher's Dignity Coalition; Alliance of Concerned Teachers; Tanggol Kasaysayan

The Ibalik ang Philippine History sa High School Movement (transl. Return Philippine History in the High School Movement) is a collective term for an educational reform movement in the Philippines. It is a loose movement advocating the reinstatement of Philippine History as a dedicated Social Studies subject (transl. Araling Panlipunan in Filipino) in the high school curriculum of the Philippines.

== History ==
Philippine History, as a subject, has been part of the secondary education curriculum of the Philippines since the American colonial period. Philippine History was taught as a dedicated Social Studies subject in the 1st year level of high school. The K-12 curriculum was implemented on June 4, 2012 starting with SY 2012-2013 where it involved major reforms in Philippine Education that resulted to a twelve-year basic education program. To guarantee K-12's continuity, the Enhanced Basic Education Act of 2013, otherwise known as the K-12 Law, passed into legislation on May 15, 2013. It was an educational policy lobbied by President Benigno Aquino III.

In congruent to the K-12 Law, the Department of Education made massive changes in the Social Studies curriculum of the Philippines. Initially, Philippine History was included in the 7th grade Social Studies curriculum for the secondary level in 2013.

By 2014, the initial K-12 plan for Social Studies underwent an overhaul. These changes were codified in the Department of Education Order 20, s. 2014. The new department order effectively removed Philippine History from the high school curriculum. No rationale was written in the government order explaining its pedagogical basis. As a result, social Studies subjects in high school emphasized a global perspective rather than a balanced global-Philippine and democratic perspective.

High School social studies curriculum in the Philippines
GRADE LEVEL	Revised Basic Education Curriculum (DepEd Order 43, 2002)	K-12 Curriculum (Initial Plan)	K-12 Curriculum (DepEd Order 20, 2014)
Grade 7	Philippine History & Government	Sources in Philippine History	Asian Studies
Grade 8	Asian Studies	Asian Studies	World History
Grade 9	World History	World History	Economics
Grade 10	Economics	Economics	Contemporary Issues
Grade 11	N/A	Philippine Contemporary Issues	Understanding Culture, Society, and Politics (Core Subject)
Grade 12	N/A	Global Contemporary Issues	Personal Development (Core Subject)

== Response ==
Organizations and personalities opposed Department of Education Order 20, s. 2014. The earliest opposition came from militant groups that were subsuming this issue with protests against the K-12 in 2015. These groups stated that "the elimination of subjects like Philippine History, Filipino, Literature and Philippine Government as a result of the K-12 Program violates the Constitution's provision on providing 'core values of Philippine education.'"

The Teacher’s Dignity Coalition (TDC), a teacher activist group, was one of the organizations that made the earliest pronouncements against DepEd Order 20, s. 2014. According to its chairperson, Benjo Basas, historical amnesia becomes more apparent in students with such policy. In 2017, Basas further elaborated that students “might forget about their glorious past and distinct national character and identity in guise of being globally competitive.” TDC has made similar statements calling for the return of Philippine History in high school in 2018 and 2019. These calls were timed during Philippine holidays of historical significance such as the National Heroes Day.

The Alliance of Concerned Teachers (ACT-Teachers), a left-wing party-list group for teachers, similarly called for the return of Philippine History in high school. According to ACT-Teachers, high school Philippine history is necessary to strengthen the nationalist fervor of the Filipino youth. ACT-Teachers called for its return while advocating for the review and overhaul of the K-12 program. ACT-Teachers has been actively pressuring the Department of Education to pursue these changes.

Antonio Calipjo-Go, a renowned Filipino educator from Marian School of Quezon City and campaigner against textbook errors, condemned the K -12 curriculum for its “infirmities and defects.” He slammed its inaccurate history textbooks and the removal of Philippine History in high school. Calipjo-Go blamed the curriculum for leading students to believe “dubious concoction of hidden, withheld, sanitized or falsified information.” He called for a stronger Philippine History in the secondary curriculum that promotes “country, nationalism and patriotism.”

In response to Calipjo-Go and other groups, Department of Education Secretary Leonor Briones publicly stated that Philippine History has always been part of the K-12 curriculum for high school. According to her statement, Philippine History under K-12 is “naturally integrated” in other Social Studies subjects such as 7th grade Asian Studies. Although it does not have a dedicated subject under the high school K-12 curriculum, Philippine History is taught as integrated subtopics across different disciplines.

Filipino writer, Isagani Cruz, also mentioned that Philippine History is integrated across different subjects and disciplines in the K-12. In response to calls for the return of Philippine History in High School, he states that, “because the curriculum is so comprehensive, it is very difficult for a casual reader to identify the various strands that unify the content and performance standards of the different learning areas and grade levels.”

As a counter-response to Briones, Calipjo-Go said that the Philippine History topics in different Social Studies subjects and disciplines in high school were barely mentioned in standard curriculum guides given to schools by the Department of Education. He inferred that there is an agenda to “to sanitize, trivialize” Philippine History in high school.

== Organized initiatives ==
=== Online initiatives ===
By 2018, a Change.org petition was initiated advocating the return of Philippine History in junior high school and senior high school under the K-12 curriculum. It calls the Department of Education, the Philippine Congress, and other relevant cultural agencies to pursue this educational advocacy. As of 2020, around 45,000 signatories have signed for its return. The petition was initiated by Jamaico Ignacio, an educator from the junior high school of the Ateneo de Manila University.

On the same year, Ignacio founded the Ibalik ang Philippine History sa High School Movement. It is an “informal, non-partisan, and pro-Philippines” organization of “like-minded teachers, students, and professionals” seeking to take this cause online. It is the first known organized initiative that solely addresses the issue. It is also an online campaign aimed at garnering national traction on this issue in order to push for educational reforms in the Social Studies curriculum in the Philippines. The campaign involves online promotion of the petition, publication of online essays, and production of online infographics to explain the issue. The group made media several appearances to support their cause. The online movement has recently re-branded itself into the High School Philippine History Movement. The movement is also engaged in fact-checking of historical inaccuracies and disinformation.

=== Round-table discussion ===
In 2019, Cristina Cristobal, an educator from the Philippine Science High School and Metrobank Foundation Outstanding Filipino Award for Teachers recipient, made similar calls for the advocacy. She said that Philippine History in high school enhances critical and historical thinking of students. With no Philippine History in high school, students can be susceptible to “historical distortions.” For her doctorate, she pursued dissertation studies that reinforce the importance of “historical thinking skills” in basic education.

She advocated for this reform in order to strengthen government accountability and to prevent voters from electing "political figures with corrupt backgrounds to high government positions." She added that proper instruction in Philippine history will help Filipinos elect better leaders.

With the Metrobank foundation, she organized round-table discussions about the issue with government officials from the Department of Education.

=== Support from the PHA ===
The Philippine Historical Association (PHA), the leading professional association for historians and history professors in the Philippines, expressed support for the return of Philippine History in high school. In a statement, PHA expressed concern on the removal of Philippine History in high school. The group noted that Philippine History is only taught in the elementary level and in the college level. A six-year gap between elementary and college levels proves problematic for tertiary students. They emphasized that “the difficulty to reinforce learning due to the time gap in teaching Philippine history may also result in confusion and even misinterpretation of our past.” It called on its members to support initiatives for such advocacy.

=== House Bill No. 5123 ===
In the Philippine House of Representatives, a few congressmen made initiatives heeding the call of the movement. In January 2020, Quezon City Rep. Jose Christopher Belmonte and Magdalo Partylist Rep. Manuel Cabochan III filed House Bill No. 5123, entitled “Readings in Philippine History II: World War II in the Philippines.” Although it focuses on World War II history of the Philippines, the aim of the bill is to “inculcate patriotism and nationalism, and appreciation of the role of national heroes in the historical development of the country” in the senior high school level. The bill is pending at the committee level as of the 18th congress.

== Positions ==
The calls for the return of a dedicated subject in Philippine History is divided into two major schools of thought.

=== Nationalist perspective ===
One school of thought emphasizes nationalism as the foremost argument for returning Philippine History in the secondary level. For this school of thought, the issue is a political agenda. Mass movements and activism is an important component for their advocacy.

The Alliance of Concerned Teachers desires a “nationalist, scientific, and mass-oriented education.” Meanwhile, the Teachers’ Dignity Coalition calls for a “need to reform the curriculum to instill patriotism, respect for justice, human rights and rule of law.” Another group, Tanggol Kasaysayan (transl. Defend History), an affiliate of Tanggol Wika, seeks to combat “fake news” and disinformation through history education. These groups condemn the K-12 Social Studies curriculum that is patterned after "topics created by the US National Council for Social Studies."

For these groups, a curriculum that excessively emphasizes globalization and capitalism over national interests will prove detrimental to a nation. "The approach should be a combination of national interest, scientific analysis and sound policy judgment that is not hinged on profit or reaching global standards, but is imbued with a high sense of public duty."

Most of these groups are left-wing organizations or activist groups that include this advocacy as a part of a larger sociopolitical agenda. Included in this larger agenda is the overhaul of the country's K-12 system. The removal of Philippine History in high school became one of the reasons to call for the suspension of the K-12 system by the Suspend K to 12 Alliance, an umbrella movement affiliated with ACT-Teachers and other left-wing groups of the Makabayan Bloc.

=== Pedagogic perspective ===
Another school of thought emphasizes pedagogy as the foremost argument for returning Philippine History in the secondary level. For this school of thought, the issue is a non-partisan and an educational reform campaign. Their actions involve publications, petitions, public lectures, and dialogue with government and stakeholders. Generally, they are not affiliated nor associated with left-wing activist groups. They consider themselves independent and reform-minded educators. Although patriotism is also an integral argument for their advocacy, their opinions center on education as the key rationale for their actions. For them, Philippine History is essential in citizenship education and heritage appreciation.

The "Ibalik ang Philippine History sa High School" Movement emphasizes the need for a cohesive and developmental Philippine History curriculum from elementary, high school, until the college level. The aim is to mold patriotic, critical and responsible Filipino citizens. Their developmental perspective follows the psychosocial theories of Erik Erikson. The group also states that “natural integration” of Philippine History as subtopics across different Social Studies subjects does not work due to limited contact class hours. "Logistically, it is nearly impossible to integrate Philippine History in Asian History or any other non-AP subjects given the constraints."

The Philippine Historical Association highlight the six-year gap with no Philippine history between elementary and college. With no Philippine History in high school, college students will have problems with their college history classes. The group noted that the exposure "of the student on the subject is too early [elementary level] and too distant from the student’s next exposure, which takes place in tertiary education, when Philippine History becomes part of the General Education Curriculum in college."

Other practitioners such as Ignacio, Calipjo-Go and Cristobal have emphasized this advocacy due to the age bracket of high school students. High school students have the maturity and disposition to better combat historical distortions with critical thinking and historical skills.

These groups, consisting of educational practitioners, professionals, and historians, espouse an educational reform mindset. The return of Philippine History in high school is their sole social agenda.
