= Esmiringhoy =

Visayan slang word

Esmiringhoy (also spelled esmeringhoy or ismiringhoy) is a slang word described as an old Cebuano term for a mistress or a person involved in an extramarital relationship. In October 2026, it became popular on social media as a term for sexual intercourse, after an episode of the television program Raffy Tulfo in Action went viral. Esmiringhoy also appeared in memes referencing popular culture. One example changed the title of the romantic comedy series Sex and the City to "Esmiringhoy and the City".

Pablo John Garcia, president of the Akademyang Bisaya, explained that the word originally referred to a person rather than an act. He said it was an old Cebuano slang term for a mistress or someone involved in an extramarital relationship. According to Garcia, the word had largely fallen out of everyday use by the late 1970s.

The word was documented before it became popular on social media. In his 1996 book English-Visayan Vocabulary (Thesaurus Style), Ben Garcia listed esmiringhoy and esmiringhay as Visayan equivalents of "concubinage". The entry did not give separate definitions for the two terms. The spelling and origin of the word have also been discussed by Visayan language writers. In a 2017 discussion on Binisaya spelling, E. S. Godin argued that ismiringhoy, beginning with the letter "i", was more consistent with the spelling rules for native Binisaya words.

Benjamin M. Mendillo Jr. of the Komisyon sa Wikang Filipino described the word as a combination of esmi, a slang term for a spouse, and iring, the Visayan word for cat. He also noted that the word was not included in the commission's standardized dictionary or official register.
