= Leoncio P. Deriada =

Award-winning writer and professor in the Philippines

Leoncio P. Deriada was a Filipino writer and professor emeritus of creative writing and literature at the University of the Philippines in the Visayas in Iloilo.

== Early life and education ==
He was born on January 13, 1938, in the town of Barotac Viejo, in the province of Iloilo in central Philippines but spent most of his life in Davao City in Southern Mindanao region of the country. He attended the Davao City High School, graduating in 1955. He earned his BA English degree at the Ateneo de Davao University with cum laude honors in 1959. He later received his Master of Arts in English from Xavier University in 1970 and went on to receive his PhD in English and Literature with a specialization in creative writing from Silliman University in 1981 where he later on served as professor and chairperson of the English Department.

== Works ==
He is a multi-lingual writer having produced works in English, Filipino, Hiligaynon, Kinaray-a and Cebuano. His seventeen Palanca Awards include works in English, Filipino and Hiligaynon. Of these seventeen, five are first-prize winners, and these include "The Day of the Locusts" (Short Story, 1975), "Mutya ng Saging" (Dulaang May Isang Yugto, 1987), "The Man Who Hated Birds" (Short Story for Children, 1993), "Medea of Siquijor" (One-Act Play, 1999), and "Maragtas: How Kapinangan Tricked Sumakwel Twice" (Full-Length Play, 2001). He became a Palanca Hall of Famer on September 1, 2001.

== Awards ==
Aside from his Palanca awards, he has garnered other awards such as the Gawad CCP para sa Sining, Gawad Pambansang Alagad ni Balagtas (awarded by the Unyon ng mga Manunulat sa Pilipinas), Asiaweek, Graphic, Focus, Yuhum Magazine (Iloilo), and Blue Knight Award from Ateneo de Davao for Outstanding Achievement in Literature. In 2002, he was one of Metrobank's Outstanding Teachers.

He is Professor Emeritus at the University of the Philippines Visayas, where he was the head of the Sentro ng Wikang Filipino. He was also an associate of the U.P. Institute of Creative Writing.

Deriada died in Iloilo City on April 3, 2019. In the same year his book Ang Kalye nga Wala sing Kamatayon: The Palanca Award-winning Short Stories of Leoncio P. Deriada was published posthumous by the Division of Humanities of the University of the Philippines in the Visayas. This anthology was edited by his daughter, Dulce Maria V. Deriada, also a Palanca award-winning writer.

== Selected works ==
- The Road to Mawab and Other Stories, New Day Publishers, 1984
- The Dog Eaters and Other Plays, New Day Publishers, 1986
- The Week of the Whales and Other Stories, New Day Publishers, 1994
- Little Lessons, Little Lectures, Seguiban Printers and Publishing House, 2001
