= France Castro =

Filipina educator, activist and politician

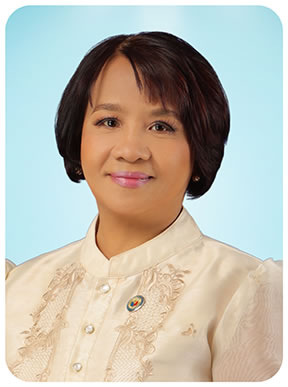
- Official portrait, 2022

Member of the Philippine House of Representatives for ACT Teachers
- In office June 30, 2016 – June 30, 2025 Serving with Antonio Tinio (2016–2019)
- Succeeded by: Antonio Tinio

Personal details
- Born: Francisca Lustina Castro; May 24, 1966 (age 60) Tagudin, Ilocos Sur, Philippines
- Party: Makabayan (2015–present); ACT Teachers (partylist; 2015–present)
- Education: Philippine Normal University (BSE (Note: The degree referenced here is either a Bachelor in Secondary Education or a Bachelor of Science in Education.)); Pamantasan ng Lungsod ng Maynila (MS)

Francisca "France" Lustina Castro (born May 24, 1966) is a Filipino educator, trade union activist, and politician who served as a member of the House of Representatives for the Alliance of Concerned Teachers (ACT) from 2016 to 2025, and was also the House deputy minority leader from 2022 to 2025.

In December 2024, Castro was among the more than 70 complainants in the second impeachment case filed against Vice President Sara Duterte.

== Early life and education ==
Castro was born in Tagudin, Ilocos Sur.

Castro's father was a driver and her mother was a housewife. Castro and her four siblings all graduated from public schools.

Castro took BSE (Note: The degree referenced here is either a Bachelor in Secondary Education or a Bachelor of Science in Education.) Math at the Philippine Normal University where she graduated cum laude. She had intended to become an accountant but her family could not afford to send her to a private school. In college, she was a member of the League of Filipino Students.

Castro was a contractual teacher at a school in Manila for four years. She applied to teach at Quirino High School in Quezon City where she was appointed to a permanent position to teach Math. As a member of ACT, she led teachers in a campaign to fight for permanent positions.

Castro is the former secretary general of ACT.

== Political career ==
=== House of Representatives (2016–2025) ===
France Castro was first elected to the House of Representatives of the Philippines in 2016, as a party-list representative for the Alliance of Concerned Teachers.

In 2019, Castro co-authored an anti-endo bill that sought to give workers security of tenure by the ending the practice of labor contractualization.

Castro filed in the 18th Congress bills increasing the salary of public school teachers and other government employees; lowering the optional retirement age of government employees; making Filipino subjects mandatory in college; exempting from taxation the compensation for people who render election service; shorter probationary period of teachers and non-teaching personnel in private schools; assigning guidance counselors in public schools; and the expanded paternity leave. She also filed the Freedom of Information Act, the Teacher Protection Act of 2019, the Public School Class Size Law, the Act Mandating Free Health Services for the People, the Revised GSIS Act of 2019, the National Education Support Personnel Day, and the COMELEC Reorganization Act, as well as a House resolution to conduct an inquiry into the status of implementation of the K to 12 Program.

In 2020, Castro joined fellow lawmakers in protesting the passage of House Bill number 6875, which eventually became the Anti-Terrorism Act of 2020.

In 2022, Castro was appointed as a deputy minority leader.

France Castro, Arlene Brosas of Gabriela, and Raoul Manuel authored the New Agrarian Emancipation Bill, which was signed into law as the New Agrarian Emancipation Act (Republic Act No. 11953) on July 7, 2023. The law writes off P57 billion worth of debt of agrarian reform beneficiaries from the Comprehensive Agrarian Reform Program. Castro said that the law would increase productivity and farmers' income in the short term and proposed a moratorium on agricultural land conversion.

In October 2023, House Deputy Minority Leader France Castro, House Assistant Minority Leader Arlene Brosas, and Representative Raoul Manuel filed House Resolution 1393, which called on the Marcos administration to cooperate in the International Criminal Court's investigation into Philippine drug war and allegations of crimes against humanity under President Rodrigo Duterte. In November 2023, House Resolution 1393 underwent first reading and was referred to the committee on rules and sent to the justice committee.

ACT Teachers Partylist and the Alliance of Concerned Teachers initiated consultations with the Department of Education and the Civil Service Commission regarding the granting of overtime benefits to teachers, which resulted in the issuance in April 2024 of Department of Education Order No. 5 Series of 2024 or the Rationalization of Teachers Workload in Public Schools and Payment of Teaching Overload. According to Castro, under the order, "teachers will be compensated for work done over and above their regular workload and beyond their regular working hours".

Castro is co-author of Kabalikat sa Pagtuturo Act, signed in June 2024, raising the allowance of public school teachers from PHP5,000 to PHP10,000 starting in 2025.

==== Confidential funds investigation ====
In August 2024, at hearings by the House appropriations panel, France Castro asked the Office of the Vice President (OVP) why it spent in 2022 P73 million in confidential funds that the Commission on Audit had disallowed. The amount is more than half the P125 million in confidential funds that the OVP spent in 11 days.

In November 2024, Castro took part in the House committee on good government and public accountability investigation on the alleged misuse of confidential funds of the Office of the Vice President and the Department of Education under Sara Duterte. The inquiry concluded that the Office of the Vice President and Department of Education under Sara Duterte spent PHP612.5 million worth of confidential funds from December 2022 to September 2023, which were justified using allegedly fabricated documents with bogus signature.

==== Quad committee investigation on drug war killings ====
Castro was part of the House quad committee that investigated the killings committed during the Philippine drug war.

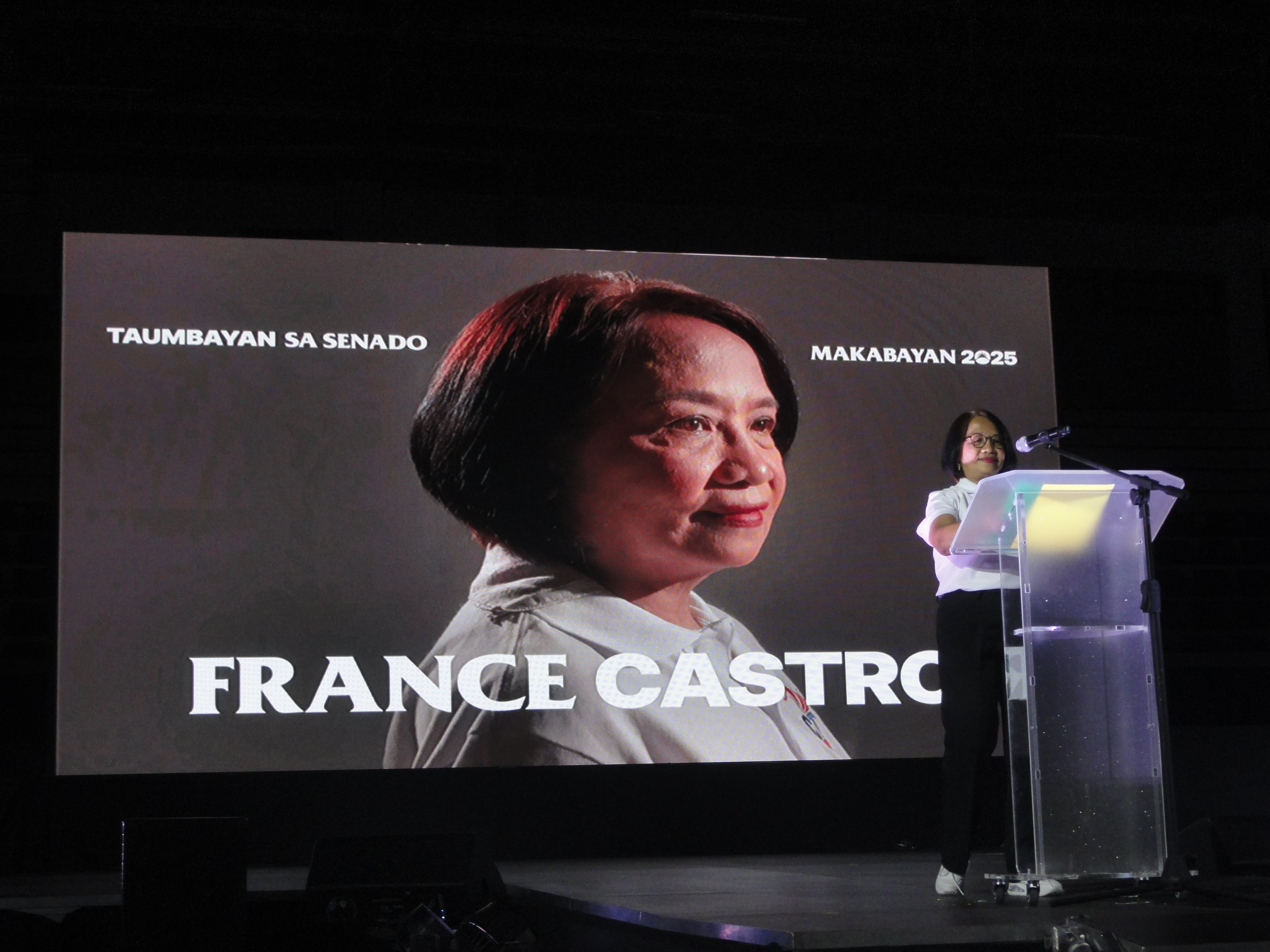
Castro during the 2024 Makabayan Convention for the 2025 elections.

=== Filing of impeachment complaint against Vice President Duterte ===
On December 4, 2024, former Congress Representative Satur Ocampo and 74 others with the endorsement of Rep. France Castro filed the second impeachment complaint against Vice President Sara Duterte, citing betrayal of public trust for her office's alleged misuse of confidential funds.

In January 2025, representatives Castro, Arlene Brosas, and Raoul Manuel sent a letter to other House members to discuss how to move the impeachment forward. On February 5, 2025, the House of Representatives approved the Articles of Impeachment, which it sent to the Senate on the same day.

=== 2025 Philippine Senate campaign ===
On June 26, 2024, during commemorations for the 42nd anniversary of the ACT, Castro declared her candidacy for the 2025 Philippine Senate election.

== Political positions ==
Castro with ACT representative Antonio Tinio (20th Congress) at a World Teachers' Day protest in Mendiola Street.

Castro supported the franchise renewal for broadcast company ABS-CBN in 2020.

Castro campaigned to increase teachers' salaries while she was secretary general of ACT. In Congress, Castro is pushing to raise the national minimum wage to PHP33,000 and teachers' basic salaries to PHP50,000 in both public and private schools.

In 2022, France Castro called on President Bongbong Marcos to end endo contractualization and regularize casual workers who have been working in government for years. According to Castro, there are more than 500,000 contractual workers out of 2.3 million employees in government.

Castro has criticized the government's jeepney phaseout plan, stating that the government lacks a coherent plan to prevent a transport crisis. She warned of possible transport fare hikes and urged the government to support local manufacturers, and protect the livelihood of jeepney operators and drivers. Castro stated in 2023 that the planned jeepney phaseout will have a "profound impact on transportation and economy, directly affecting approximately 28.5 million commuters".

France Castro supports the practice of transparency and accountability through the publication of government official's Statement of Assets, Liabilities, and Net Worth (SALN). In November 2020, Castro was among the only 5 members of the House of Representatives to release their SALN to the public.

Citing the Second Congressional Commission on Education report, Castro said that the Philippine education crises worsened under Vice President Sara Duterte's term as Secretary of Education.

== Criminal charges ==
On November 28, 2018, Satur Ocampo, Castro and over 70 others were arrested on kidnapping and human trafficking charges over the transport of Lumad minors from the town of Talaingod, Davao Del Norte. Ocampo's group was released after posting bail of PHP80,000.00 each.

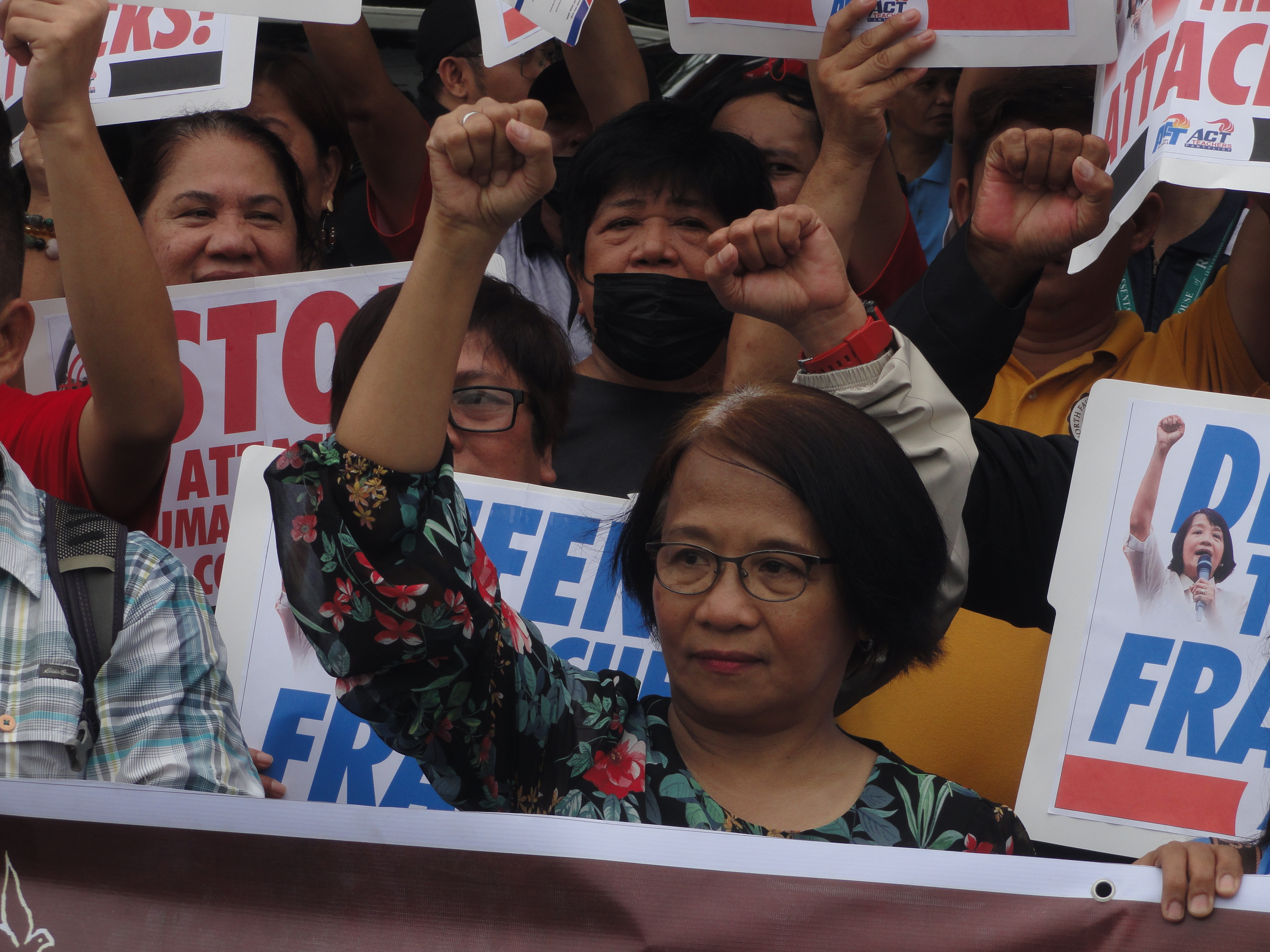
Castro in 2024 mobilization to denounce the Tagum City court conviction.

In July 2024, Tagum City Regional Trial Court Branch 2 Jimmy Bustillo Boco, in a 26-page judgment sentenced Satur Ocampo, ACT-Teachers Castro and 11 others to 4 years to 6 years imprisonment, including P10,000 as civil indemnity and P10,000 as moral damages. The accused known as “Talaingod 18” violated Section 10(a) of Republic Act 7610, for endangerment of 14 Lumad students of the Salugpongan Ta Tanu Ingkanogan Community Learning Center Inc. in Talaingod, Davao del Norte. In December 2024, the Talaingod Ata-Manobo Tribal Council filed an ethics case with Philippine House Committee on Ethics and Privileges against Castro, based on her court conviction.

Human rights groups criticized the decision of the court. Human Rights Watch placed the conviction in the context of red-tagging and other "bogus" accusations against Lumad schools in Mindanao. ASEAN Parliamentarians for Human Rights described the verdict as an "absurd decision that has no basis in reality", while ACT-NCR Union said the verdict was dangerous precedent that "criminalizes acts of solidarity and support for marginalized communities".

== Electoral history ==
Electoral history of France Castro
Year	Office	Party	Votes received				Result
Year	Office	Party	Total	%	P.	Swing	Result
2016	Representative (Party-list)	ACT-Teachers	1,180,752	3.65%	4th	—N/a	Won
2019	Representative (Party-list)	ACT-Teachers	395,327	1.42%	15th	-2.23	Won
2022	Representative (Party-list)	ACT-Teachers	330,529	0.90%	34th	-0.52	Won
2025	Senator of the Philippines	Makabayan	3,670,972	6.40%	40th	—N/a	Lost

== Awards ==
In 2019, France Castro was awarded the Arthur Svensson International Prize for Trade Union Rights for her work organizing teachers and the Febe Velasquez Trade Union Rights Award for her work in defense of trade unions and human rights.

She was also recognized as the Eminent Alumnus of the Philippine Normal University in 2018.
