= Commission on the Filipino Language =

Philippine government agency that regulates the Filipino national language

- Filipino: Komisyon sa Wikang Filipino

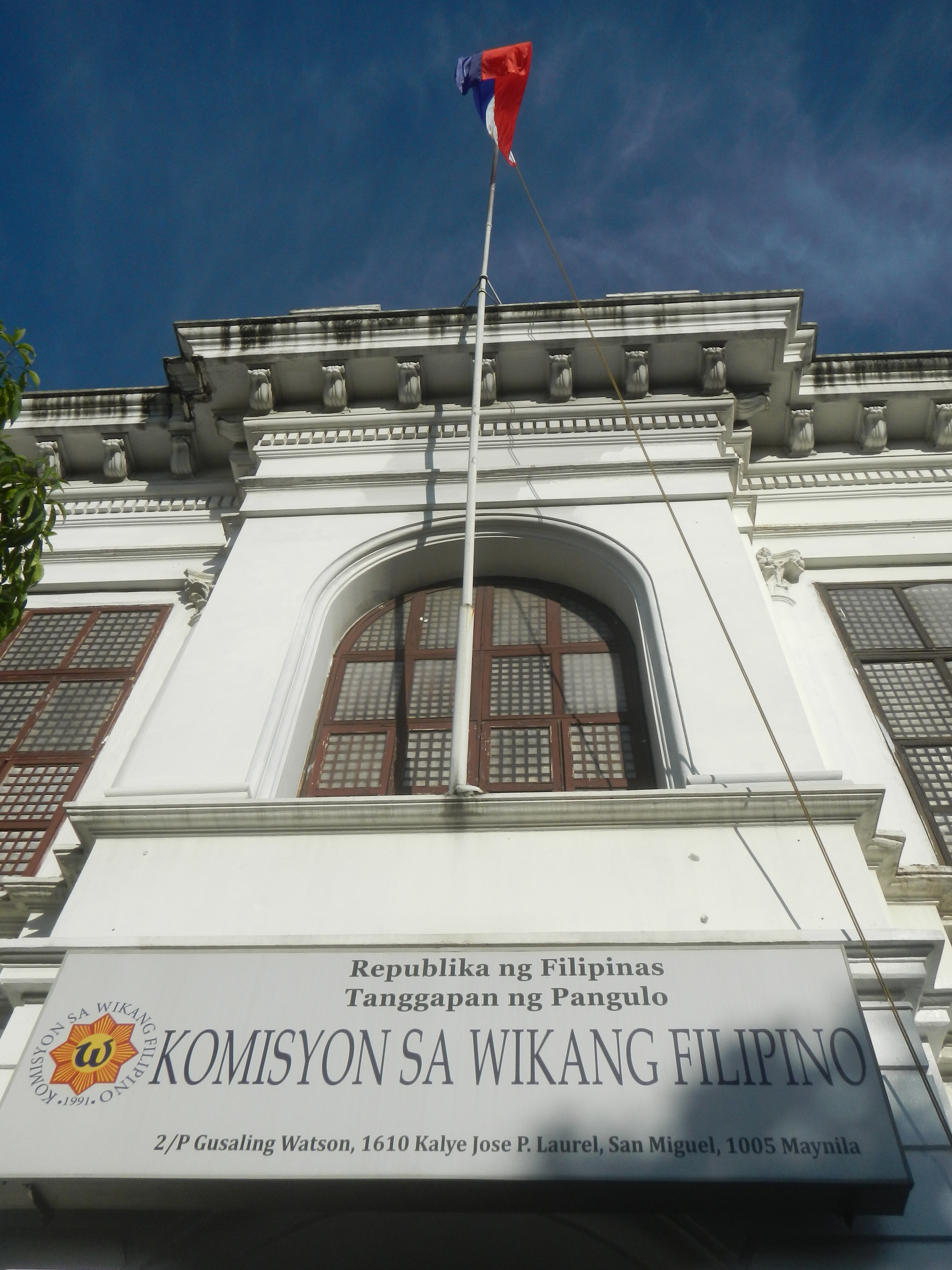
- Facade of official headquarters

Agency overview
- Formed: November 13, 1936; 90 years ago (first formation); August 14, 1991; 35 years ago (present form)
- Jurisdiction: Government of the Philippines
- Headquarters: San Miguel, Manila, Philippines; 14°35′55″N 120°59′51″E
- Employees: 49 (2024)
- Annual budget: ₱107.53 million (2018)
- Agency executives: Atty. Marites A. Barrios-Taran, Chairperson; Dr. Benjamin M. Mendillo, Jr., Commissioner IV, Administration and Finance; Dr. Carmelita C. Abdurahman, Commissioner IV, Programs and Projects
- Parent department: Office of the President of the Philippines
- Key documents: Republic Act No. 7104; Republic Act No. 11106
- Website: https://kwf.gov.ph/; https://web.facebook.com/komfilgov

The Commission on the Filipino Language, also referred to as the Komisyon sa Wikang Filipino (KWF), is the official regulatory body of the Filipino language and the official government institution tasked with developing, preserving, and promoting the various local languages of the Philippines. The commission was established in accordance with the 1987 Constitution of the Philippines.

Established by Republic Act No. 7104 in 1991, the commission is a replacement for the Institute of Philippine Languages (IPL; Linangan ng mga Wika sa Pilipinas) that was set up in 1987 which was a replacement of the older Institute of National Language (INL; Surian ng Wikang Pambansa), established in 1937 as the first government agency to foster the development of a Philippine national language.

== History ==
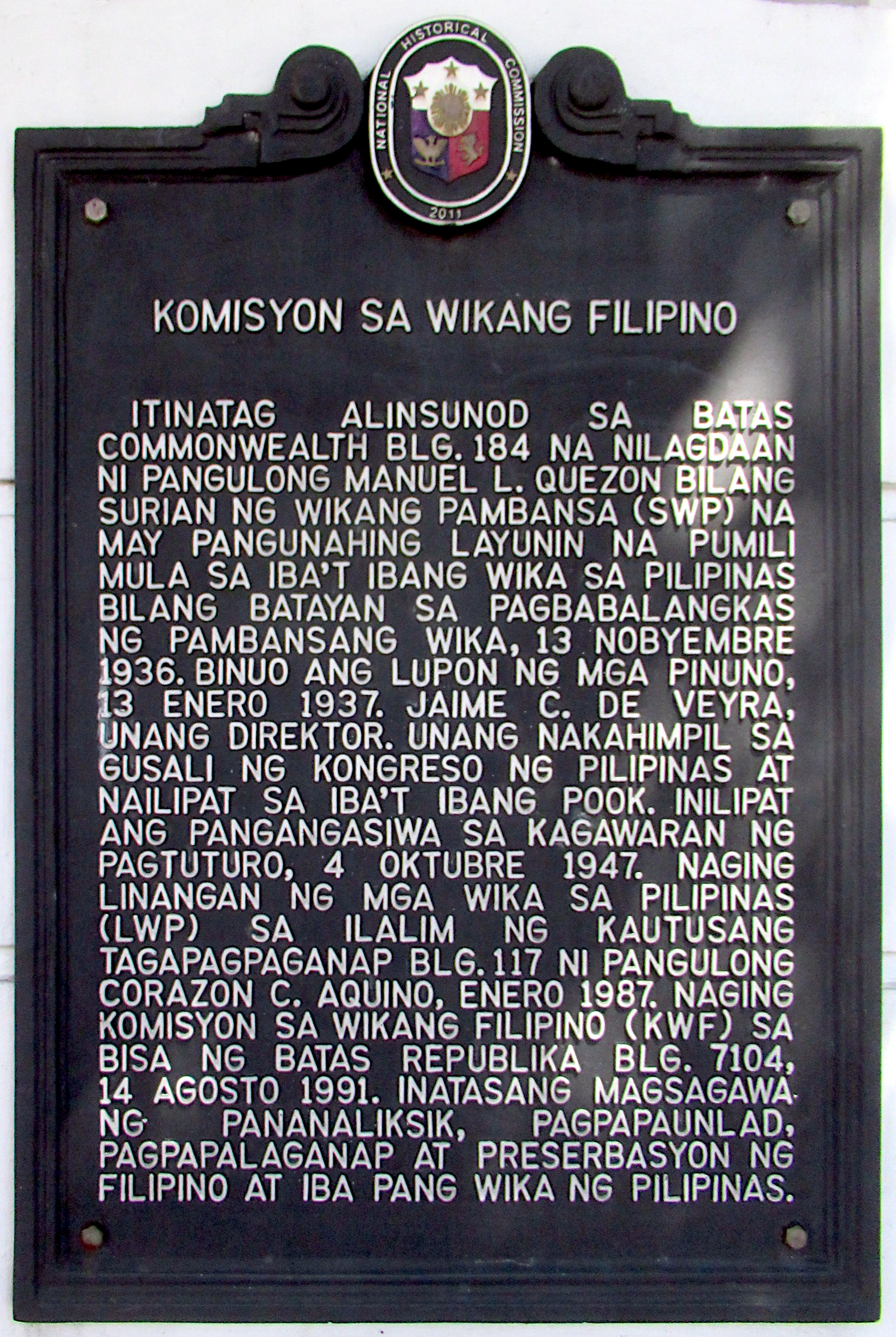
Official historical marker

The 1st National Assembly of the Philippines passed Commonwealth Act No. 184 of 1936, establishing the Institute of National Language (Surian ng Wikang Pambansa). On January 12, 1937, President Manuel L. Quezon appointed the members to compose the INL. By virtue of Executive Order No. 134 issued and signed by President Quezon on December 30, 1937, approved the adoption of Tagalog as the basis of the national language, and declared and proclaimed the national language based on Tagalog, as the national language of the Philippines. Quezon himself was born & raised in Baler, Aurora, which is a native Tagalog-speaking area. In 1938, the INL was dissolved and replaced with the National Language Institute. Its purpose was to prepare for the nationwide teaching of the Tagalog-based national language by creating a dictionary and a grammar book with a standardized orthography. In the school year of 1940–1941, the teaching of the national language, with its new standardized orthography, was set by law in the fourth year of all high schools in both public and private schools throughout the country. The Tagalog-based national language was taught in school only as one of the subject areas in 1940, but was not adapted as the medium of instruction.

The current commission was established by Republic Act No. 7104 of 1991, replacing the Institute of Philippine Languages (IPL) that was previously set up in January 1987 (Executive Order No. 117); itself, a replacement of the older Institute of National Language (INL), established in 1937.

== Original commission members (circa 1937) ==
- Jaime C. de Veyra (Waray-Waray Visayan), Chairman
- Santiago A. Fonacier (Ilocano), Member
- Casimiro F. Perfecto (Bicolano), Member
- Felix S. Salas Rodriguez (Hiligaynon Visayan), Member
- Filemon Sotto (Cebuano Visayan), Member
- Cecilio López (Tagalog), Member and Secretary
- Hadji Butu (Moro), Member

== Board of Commissioners (present) ==
The following is a list of the current acting management officials.

- Atty. Marites A. Barrios-Taran (Chairperson, Full-time Commissioner for Tagalog)
- Dr. Benjamin M. Mendillo Jr. (Full-time Commissioner for Ilocano)
- Dr. Carmelita C. Abdurahman (Full-time Commissioner for Waray)
- Dr. Melchor E. Orpilla (Part-time Commissioner for Pangasinan)
- Dr. Reggie O. Cruz (Part-time Commissioner for Kapampangan)
- Dr. Evelyn C. Oliquino (Part-time Commissioner for Bikol)
- Dr. Hope S. Yu (Part-time Commissioner for Cebuano)
- Dr. Ruth M. Tindaan (Part-time Commissioner for Languages of Northern Cultural Communities)
- Dr. Christian T. N. Aguado (Part-time Commissioner for Languages of Southern Cultural Communities)
- Alain Russ Dimzon (Part-time Commissioner for Hiligaynon)
- Vacant (Commissioner for Languages of Muslim Mindanao)

== Composition ==
The KWF consists of the following divisions:

- Sangay ng Leksikograpiya at Korpus ng Pilipinas (Philippine Lexicography and Corpus Division)
- Sangay ng Salin (Translation Division)
- Sangay ng Lingguwistika, Publikasyon, at Promosyon (Linguistics, Publication, and Promotion Division)
- Sangay ng Impormasyon at Multimedia (Information and Multimedia Division)
- Sangay ng Pangasiwaan at Pananalapi (Administrative and Finance Division)

== Dictionary of the Filipino Language ==
In 2021, the Komisyon sa Wikang Filipino (KWF) launched kwfdiksiyonaryo.ph, an online version of the Diksiyonaryo ng Wikang Filipino (DWF) and the Commission’s principal lexicographic project on the Filipino language intended for scholars and the general public.

The dictionary traces its origins to the Diksyunaryo ng Wikang Filipino first published in 1989, considered the first monolingual dictionary of Filipino and originally containing more than 31,000 entries prepared by the former Institute of Philippine Languages. The dictionary has since undergone multiple revisions and expansions to reflect changes in contemporary Filipino usage. Recent editions added contemporary vocabulary, colloquial expressions, semantic innovations, internet and media terminology, and lexical items from various Philippine languages. The KWF has described its orthographic standardization project as an evolving resource and encouraged public feedback and scholarly participation in its continued development.

== Work on Endangered Languages ==
The KWF has counted a total of 135 Philippine languages as opposed to the Ethnologue, a compendium of world languages, which lists 175 distinct native languages.

According to a 2015 study by the Komisyon sa Wikang Filipino (KWF), 37 Philippine languages were identified as endangered, many of them Aeta languages in Luzon and Visayas. The study classified the languages according to their degree of endangerment. Some languages were considered nearly extinct or extinct. The Karol-an language in Negros Occidental was already considered extinct because it was no longer used in everyday conversation, while Inagtâ Isaróg in Camarines Sur reportedly had only one remaining speaker in 2015. Árta in Quirino was described as nearly extinct, with only 11 speakers remaining. Several languages were categorized as moribund or near extinction, including Inatá, Álta, and Ayta Magbukun. Other languages still had more than a thousand speakers but were considered threatened, such as Álta Kabulowán, Ayta Mag-Indí, and Gubatnón Mangyán.

The KWF also identified languages experiencing declining use, including Bolinaw, Binaták, Manidé, and several Ayta and Agta languages. Another group of languages was labeled “under threat” and in need of further research, including Gâdang, Kalamyanën, several Mangyán languages, and various Manobo varieties. One exception was Irungdungan (Agta Isirigan), which the KWF noted was actually seeing an increase in speakers.

In response to these concerns, the KWF launched a language revitalization project in Abucay, Bataan in 2018 focused on the Ayta Magbukun language. Through the Bahay Wika program, elders taught the language to younger community members in an effort to revive it.

== Library ==
The KWF maintains in its main office the Aklatang Balmaseda, a special library for research on Filipino and other Philippine languages. Named after Julian Cruz Balmaseda, a former director of the INL, it houses collections on language, literature, culture, and other Filipiniana topics, including the Balmaseda Collection, Villanueva Collection, Aklat ng Bayan, and Yamang-Salin. The library has more than 6,000 printed items and over 700 e-books available through its online portal. Its onsite services are open Monday to Thursday, 8:00 a.m. to 5:00 p.m., while online services are available Monday to Friday during the same hours.

== Orthography and Standardization ==
The KWF became closely associated with orthographic standardization during the chairmanship of National Artist Virgilio Almario, particularly through the publication of the Ortograpiyang Pambansa, which was later included in its style guide, Manwal sa Masinop na Pagsulat. The orthography book consolidated rules on Filipino spelling based on existing usage, earlier orthographic reforms, and KWF forums and consultations on disputed spelling issues. It was also adopted by the Department of Education through Department Order No. 34, s. 2013.

Among its best-known rules are those on borrowed words, vowel sequences, and consonant clusters. For example, the guide generally treats Spanish-derived sequences such as -ia, -io, -ua, and -ue by replacing weak vowels i and u with y and w in forms such as síya, benepísyo, indibidwál, and perwísyo, while preserving the vowel in exceptions such as biyáhe, puwéde, leksiyón, impluwénsiyá, koléhiyó, and ekonomíya. It also, controversially, discourages so-called siyokoy words, a term associated with Almario for hybrid pseudo-Hispanic forms that are neither exact Spanish nor English borrowings, e.g., aspeto (cf. aspékto from the Spanish “aspecto”), dayalogo (cf. diyálogó from the Spanish “dialogo”), etc.

== National Language Month ==
The KWF leads the annual observance of Buwan ng Wikang Pambansa (National Language Month), known commonly as just Buwan ng Wika (Language Month) but this is unofficial, which is celebrated every August. The month-long observance was established by Proclamation No. 1041, signed by President Fidel V. Ramos on July 15, 1997, extending the earlier Linggo ng Wika into a full month from August 1 to 31.

As lead language agency, the KWF announces the yearly theme and organizes activities promoting Filipino and the other languages of the Philippines. Recent themes have emphasized both Filipino and other Philippine languages, such as the 2025 theme “Paglinang sa Filipino at Katutubong Wika: Makasaysayan sa Pagkakaisa ng Bansa.”

== Criticism ==
One major criticism of the commission is that it supposedly fails in its goal of further developing the Filipino language. This is grounded in the fact that Filipino is essentially Tagalog, a fact acknowledged by former Commissioner, Ricardo María Durán Nolasco, and with an impoverished technical and scientific vocabulary, at that, which relies heavily on foreign borrowings and, often, constructions. It is often left to the universities to develop their own respective terminologies for each field, leading to a lack of uniformity and general public disuse. It is then argued that current state of the Filipino language is contrary to the intention of Republic Act (RA) No. 7104 that requires that the national language be developed and enriched by the lexicon of the country's other languages.

However, a particular Facebook informational series of the KWF entitled Salit-salitaan has shown the attempts of the Commission recently to develop the national language based on loanwords from other Philippine languages, in accordance with the 1987 Constitution. Words like dágaw ('daydreaming' in Cebuano), andáp ('frost' in Kankanaëy), fútag ('umbilical cord' in Ibanag), kábus ('full moon' in Ilokano), and many more—all concepts which lack one-word equivalents in Tagalog—have been carefully added into their official dictionary, the KWF Diksiyonaryo ng Wikang Filipino, in hopes of enriching the lexicon of "Filipino."

In 2013, the KWF adopted a board resolution promoting Filipinas instead of Pilipinas as the Filipino name of the Philippines. The resolution, associated with then-chair National Artist Virgilio Almario, recommended a gradual and nationwide implementation, including the use of Filipinas by newly established organizations. KWF argued that the change reflected the modern Filipino alphabet, which includes the letter F, a letter found in other Philippine languages, and restored the older historical name of the country. The proposal drew public criticism over its practicality and the commission’s authority to alter the established national name. The policy was later reversed under the administration of Arthur P. Casanova, with the Commission saying that Pilipinas should be used in Filipino because it is the form used in the 1987 Constitution.

On June 1, 2024, the coalitions of Philippine Federation of the Deaf and Alliance of Concerned Teachers staged a protest-rally at Liwasang Bonifacio against the KWF-Arthur P. Casanova, for the cultural retention of Filipino Sign Language (Republic Act 11106). The members said the FSL Unit of the KWF abolition will effectively layoff the deaf personnel, “thus, depriving Deaf Filipinos of their language rights and violating the mandate of RA 7104.”

== See also ==
- Language policy
- Philippine languages
- Comparison of orthographies of languages of the Philippines
- Filipino alphabet
- Filipino orthography
- Sentro ng Wikang Filipino
- Visayan Academy of Arts and Letters

Defunct language regulators

- Academia Bicolana
- Sanghiran san Binisaya
