= Marites Barrios-Taran =

Filipino public official

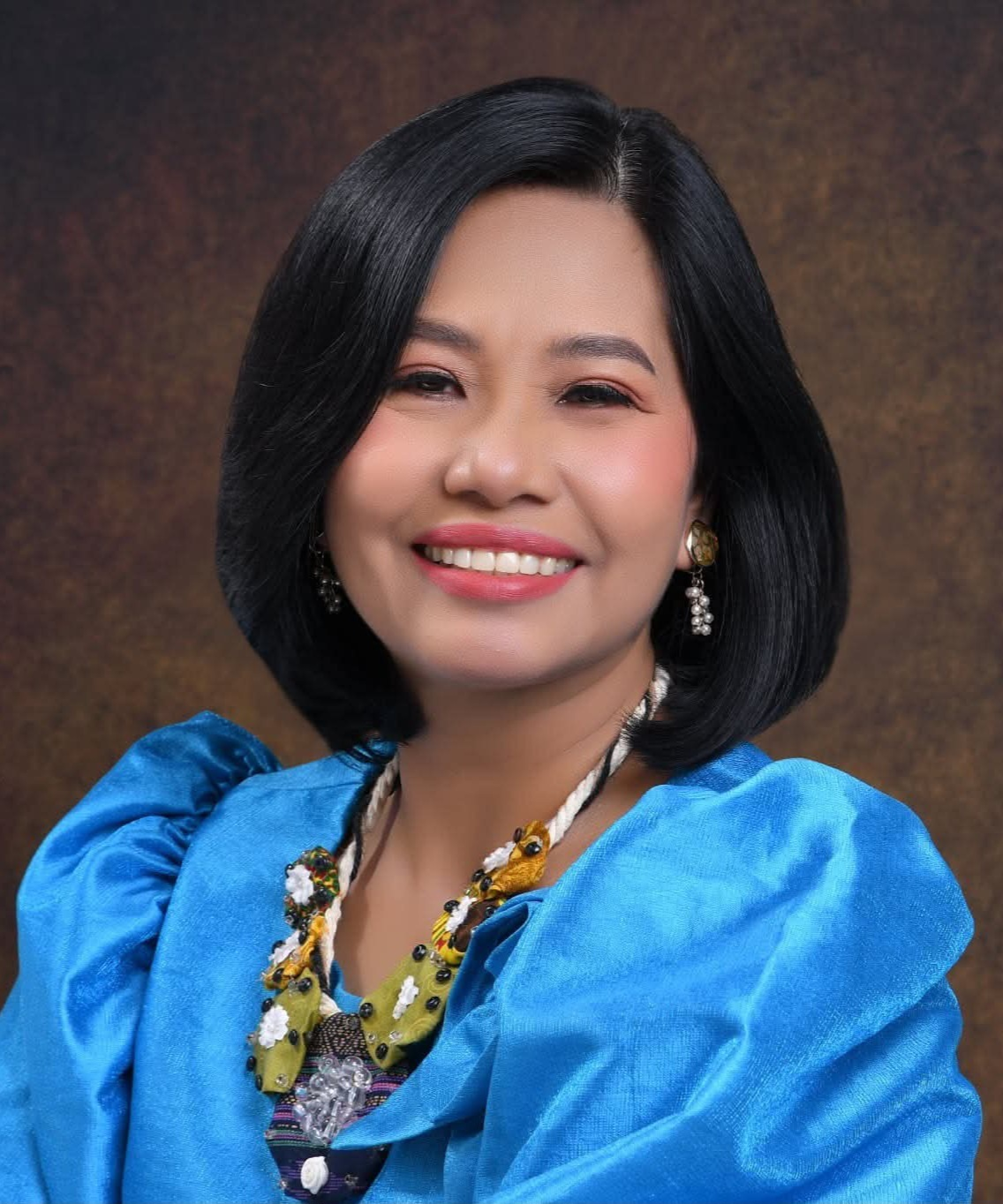
- Barrios-Taran in 2026

Chairperson of the Commission on the Filipino Language
- In office 2025 – up to present

Director-General of the Commission on the Filipino Language
- In office 2023–2025
- President: Ferdinand R. Marcos Jr.

Personal details
- Born: Marites A. Barrios Malinao, Aklan, Philippines
- Education: Saint Joseph's Academy of Malinao, Aklan, Inc. (HS); Pamantasan ng Lungsod ng Maynila (BA Accounting, J.D., Master of Government Management, and Ll.M)
- Occupation: Certified Public Accountant • Lawyer • Filipino and native languages advocate

Marites A. Barrios-Taran is a Filipino public servant, accountant, lawyer, educator, and cultural leader.

Barrios-Taran serves as the Chairperson and Commissioner representing the Tagalog language at the Commission on the Filipino Language (Komisyon sa Wikang Filipino).

== Early life and education ==
Barrios-Taran was born in Malinao, Aklan and finished high school in 1984 at Saint Joseph's Academy, which would later invite her as its commencement speaker. A scholar, she graduated from the Pamantasan ng Lungsod ng Maynila (PLM) with a Bachelor of Business Administration major in Accounting in 1989.

After passing the CPA Licensure Examinations, Barrios-Taran chose to pursue law studies and completed a Master in Government Management at the same University, becoming its first alumna of the Master of Laws program. She passed the 1994 Bar Examinations and signed the Roll of Attorneys on April 27, 1995. She served as PLM's first Legal Counsel, and later as the Secretary of the University and to the Board of Regents.

== Career ==
Barrios-Taran was a CPA-lawyer before holding public office in the Philippines.

As a lawyer and researcher, many of the cases Barrios-Taran handled reached the High Court, and some of them were published in the Supreme Court Reports Annotated (SCRA).

Barrios-Taran previously served as Director II at the House of Representatives.

As KWF Chair, Barrios-Taran introduced the five pillars of language service centered on Saliksik-Wika, Sagip-Wika, Sulong-Wika, Salin-Wika, and Sinop-Wika.

== Awards and recognition ==
- 2026 - Sulo ng Pagtataguyod ng Wika, Kapisanan ng mga Filipino Awtor at Manunulat sa Pilipinas (KAFAMPI)
- 2026 - Gawad Gintong Laurel, Pambansang Samahan ng mga Propesyonal at Mananaliksik sa Pilipinas, Inc. (PSPPI)
- 2025 - Haribon Awards (Outstanding Alumna), PLM-PLMAAI
- 2001 - VACC Awards, with Volunteers Against Crime and Corruption Chair Dante Jimenez and Philippine President Gloria Macapagal-Arroyo
- JICA Fellowship, Japan International Cooperation Agency
