= Tanggol =

Tanggol may refer to:

- Hesus Nazareno "Tanggol" Montenegro, the main character of ABS-CBN's 2023 action drama series FPJ's Batang Quiapo
- Tanggol Wika (also known as Alyansa ng Mga Tagapagtanggol ng Wikang Filipino), a Philippine-based organization since 2014
