= Alliance of Concerned Teachers =

Political party in the Philippines

ACT Teachers
- — Philippine partylist —
- Full name: Alliance of Concerned Teachers
- Sector(s) represented: Education
- Founded: 1982
- Headquarters: Quezon City, Metro Manila
- Ideology: National democracy Progressivism; Left-wing nationalism
- Political position: Far-left
- National affiliation: Bayan; Makabayan
- Colors: Light blue
- Slogan: Ang Tunay na Tinig ng Teachers! (transl. The Real Voice of the Teachers!)

Current representation (20th Congress)
- Seats in the House of Representatives: 1 / 3 (Out of 63 party-list seats)
- Representative(s): Antonio Tinio

Website
- www.act-teachers.com

The Alliance of Concerned Teachers (ACT Teachers) is a progressive national democratic mass organization of teachers, academics, and other education workers in the Philippines, established on June 26, 1982. It is the largest non-traditional teachers' organization in the country, and campaigns for the economic and political rights of teachers and other education workers as well as on wider social and political issues.

ACT Teachers Partylist is part of the left-wing Makabayan Bloc, and is known for its active campaign for salary hikes for teachers, successful tax reduction initiatives, optional poll service duty for teachers, and lowering of optional retirement age of public school teachers.

== History ==
In 1989, ACT succeeded in its campaign for higher wages of $32 a month as well as improved benefits for teachers. This was achieved after public school teachers went on strike from July 24 to August 12.

On September 30, 2005, national council member of the ACT Vitoria Samonte was murdered, an act which was called a human rights violation.

Another national council member, Napoleon Pornasdoro, was murdered on February 27, 2006. They were also general secretary of the Southern Tagalog Teachers for Development.

ACT Teachers Partylist is also an active proponent of the Supreme Court cases against the Philippine government's K to 12 system, co-filing at least two K to 12-related cases in 2015, and successfully securing a temporary restraining order (TRO) against a government order that abolishes Filipino language subject in college. It also supported the abolition of the corruption-prone pork barrel system in the Philippine congress.

On June 1, 2024, the coalitions of Philippine Federation of the Deaf and Alliance of Concerned Teachers staged a protest-rally at Liwasang Bonifacio against the Commission on the Filipino Language-Arthur P. Casanova, for the cultural retention of Filipino Sign Language (Republic Act 11106). The members said the FSL Unit of the CFL abolition will effectively layoff the deaf personnel, “thus, depriving Deaf Filipinos of their language rights and violating the mandate of RA 7104.”

== Objectives ==
ACT's stated objectives are:

- To unite teachers and other education workers to struggle for their democratic rights and economic welfare.
- To advance a nationalist, scientific and mass-oriented education.
- To encourage active and dynamic participation of teachers and other education workers in social transformation.
- To represent, assist and defend its affiliates and their individual members, in particular, and the teachers and other education workers, in general, in the advancement of their legitimate rights and interests.
- To launch campaigns to protect human rights, the environment and the national minorities/indigenous peoples, promote gender equality, genuine land reform, workers’ rights, and be involved with other social issues.
- To help in the formation of the broadest unity of all oppressed sectors of Philippine society in advancing the interests of the Filipino people.
- To unite with progressive individuals, groups and movements abroad who share common beliefs and aspirations with ACT-Philippines.

== Membership requirements ==
Membership of ACT is open to national and regional organizations whose membership or composition include federations, unions, alliances, cooperatives, political, disciplinal or interest associations of teachers and education workers. Active and nationalist teaching and non-teaching personnel working in the education sector at any level (pre-school, elementary, secondary or tertiary) in both public and private institutions who are members of an education-based organization are eligible.

ACT is the umbrella group of two national organizations: the Congress of Teachers for Nationalism and Democracy (CONTEND), a militant and nationalist teachers' organization, and the National Federation of Teachers and Employees' Union (NAFTEU), the national organization of school-based labor unions. Membership in these organizations means automatic affiliation with ACT.

Individual members who are eligible are also accepted.

== Organization ==
ACT's main organizing and consolidation activities are integration and education. Representatives of the organization make regular visits to update members on the organization's activities and campaigns. Discussions, dialogues, fora, and symposia are held related to current issues that directly or indirectly affect the education sector. ACT also promotes the principles and objectives of the organization among the population and campaigns against foreign influence on the Philippine educational system and wider society. ACT also provides institutional services like free legal aid, media representation, training, and other forms of assistance. It publishes a quarterly publication, the ACT Forum, for its membership.

== Electoral performance ==
Election	Votes	%	Seats
2010	372,903	1.26%	1 / 57
2013	453,491	1.66%	1 / 59
2016	1,180,752	3.65%	2 / 59
2019	395,327	1.42%	1 / 61
2022	330,529	0.90%	1 / 63
2025	348,935	0.85%	1 / 63

== Representatives to Congress ==
Period	1st Representative	2nd Representative
15th Congress; 2010–2013	Antonio Tinio	—N/a
16th Congress; 2013–2016	Antonio Tinio	—N/a
17th Congress; 2016–2019	Antonio Tinio	France Castro
18th Congress; 2019–2022	France Castro	—N/a
19th Congress; 2022–2025	France Castro	—N/a
20th Congress; 2025–2028	Antonio Tinio	—N/a
Note: A party-list group, can win a maximum of three seats in the House of Representatives.
