= Antonio Tinio =

Filipino politician

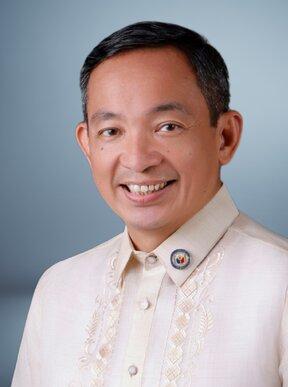
- Official portrait, 2026

Member of the Philippine House of Representatives for ACT Teachers
- Incumbent
- Assumed office June 30, 2025
- Preceded by: France Castro
- In office June 30, 2010 – June 30, 2019 Serving with France Castro (2016–2019)

House Deputy Minority Leader
- Incumbent
- Assumed office July 30, 2025
- Leader: Marcelino Libanan
- In office July 26, 2010 – June 30, 2013

Personal details
- Born: April 19, 1970 (age 56) Quezon City, Philippines
- Party: Makabayan (2009–present); ACT Teachers (partylist; 2009–present)
- Spouse: Maria Teresa Trinidad P. Tinio
- Parent: Rolando Tinio (father)

Antonio "Tonchi" Luansing Tinio is a Filipino activist and politician who serves as a member of the House of Representatives of the Philippines for ACT Teachers Partylist since 2025. He previously served in this position from 2010 to 2019 and served as Deputy Minority Leader in the 15th congress. He also served as the national chairperson of the Alliance of Concerned Teachers (ACT) from 2002 to 2012.

On December 4, 2024, Tinio and 74 others filed the second impeachment complaint against Vice President Sara Duterte, submitting one article of impeachment: betrayal of public trust.

== Early and personal life ==
Before his stint in Congress, Tinio was a University of the Philippines Diliman (UP) professor from 1991 to 2010. He is the son of playwright, movie actor, and director Rolando Tinio and theater actress Ella Luansing.

== Political career ==
As legislator, he was the principal author of Republic Act 10653, which broadened the tax exemptions for the 13th month pay (mandatory year-end bonus amounting to a month of salary) of both public and private sector employees in the Philippines, and the staunchest legislator-advocate of salary hikes for public school teachers.

In November 2025, during the flood control projects scandal in the Philippines, House Deputy Minority Leader Antonio Tinio, House Assistant Minority Leader Renee Co (Kabataan party-list), and Gabriela party-list Representative Sarah Elago filed House Resolution 515 calling for a legislative probe on Bongbong Marcos, Sandro Marcos, former Executive Secretary Lucas Bersamin, and other officials with alleged links to the flood control corruption controversy.

On January 26, 2026, Makabayan bloc members by Antonio Tinio, Renee Co, and Sarah Elago endorsed an impeachment complaint against President Bongbong Marcos.

On February 2, 2026, Makabayan bloc members by Tinio, Co, and Elago endorsed an impeachment complaint against Vice President Sara Duterte.

== Personal life ==
He is the son of Filipino poet and dramatist Rolando Tinio. Tinio is married to Maria Teresa Trinidad P. Tinio.
