= Sentro ng Wikang Filipino =

The Sentro ng Wikang Filipino (SWF; literally, "Center of the Filipino Language"), also known the Sentro, is a language academy, research center, and university-based publishing house that is part of the University of the Philippines System (UP). It has offices in various autonomous universities of UP System, the most notable of which is the one housed at the University of the Philippines Diliman (i.e. SWF Diliman) that won the Philippine National Book Award for Publisher of the Year by the Manila Critics' Circle. The Sentro is active not just within the UP system due to its mission of "developing and disseminating" the Filipino language according to the provisions of the 1987 Philippine Constitution.

One of Sentro's projects is the UP Diksiyonaryong Filipino, a monolingual Filipino dictionary.

== See also ==
- University of the Philippines Press
- Komisyon sa Wikang Filipino
- Visayan Academy of Arts and Letters

Defunct language regulators

- Academia Bicolana
- Sanghiran san Binisaya
