= UP Diksiyonaryong Filipino =

Dictionary of the Filipino language

- Author: Virgilio S. Almario (editor-in-chief)
- Language: Filipino
- Subject: Dictionary
- Publisher: Sentro ng Wikang Filipino; Anvil Publishing
- Publication date: 2001 (1st ed.), 2010 (2nd ed.)
- Publication place: Philippines
- Pages: 961 (1st ed.)
- ISBN: 971-8781-98-6
- OCLC: 50116683
- LC Class: PL6057 .U63

The UP Diksiyonaryong Filipino (UPDF; "UP Filipino Dictionary") is a series of monolingual Filipino dictionaries. The dictionaries were created by the Sentro ng Wikang Filipino of the University of the Philippines, with Virgilio S. Almario, National Artist for Literature and a professor at the University of the Philippines Diliman, as editor-in-chief.

The first edition of the UPDF was released in 2001, while the second edition was released on July 29, 2010, coinciding with the centennial of the University of the Philippines. A third edition is scheduled for release in 2015, and new editions of the UPDF will be released every five years thereafter. The second edition includes over 200,000 entries.

In planning since 1996, the UPDF has been likened to a Filipino version of the Oxford English Dictionary. An online version also exists for the benefit of overseas Filipinos.

== See also ==
- Filipino language
- Sentro ng Wikang Filipino
- University of the Philippines Diliman
