= List of the University of the City of Manila alumni =

This list of the Pamantasan ng Lungsod ng Maynila alumni includes those who studied as undergraduate or graduate students, as well as those who were given honorary degrees at the University of the City of Manila since its formal opening on July 17, 1967.

== Alumni and students ==
The table presents the partial list of outstanding alumni (also known as the PLMayers) and students of PLM.

| Bryan Joseph Granados Sabroso | International civil servant; staff member of the United Nations since 2003, with current appointment in the International Civil Aviation Organization, a UN specialized agency in Montreal, Canada. | Bachelor in Mass Communication (Cum laude) |
| Adolfo Alix, Jr. | Film director and screenwriter | A.B. Mass Communication (magna cum laude) |
| Ali I. Atienza | Chairperson, Manila's Inner-City Development Committee, Sports Council and Green Campaign; Presidential Assistant on Youth and Sports; Gold medalist, 1994 Asian Taekwondo Championships | Master of Government Management |
| Nicanor Bartolome | Director, National Capital Region Police Office (NCRPO) | Master of Business Administration, 1995 |
| Florida M. Bautista | Director and Screenplay writer | A.B. Mass Communication |
| Manuel Buising | Writer; Official screenplay writer of the late Fernando Poe, Jr.; Episode writer of "Anghel na Walang Langit," an ABS-CBN TV drama; Awardee, Carlos Palanca Hall of Fame for 2005 | B.S. Education |
| Beethoven del Valle Bunagan (Michael V.) | Second Filipino to grace the cover of Reader's Digest; Comedian and TV host at GMA Network | A.B. Mass Communication |
| Edgar Chatto | Congressman of Bohol | Master of Government Management |
| Wilma Galvante | Senior Vice President for Entertainment, GMA Network | A.B. Mass Communication |
| Liliosa Hilao | Political activist and distinguished martyr of the Marcos Regime | A.B. Mass Communication |
| Roy Iglesias | Multi-awarded screenwriter; Creative Consultant, GMA Network | A.B. Mass Communication |
| April Love Jordan | Beauty queen; First International Beauty & Model Festival winner; Miss Manila | B.S. Tourism, Hotel and Travel Industry Management |
| Panfilo Lacson | Philippine Senator; Director-General, Philippine National Police | Master of Government Management |
| Ricardo de Leon | Executive Vice President, Centro Escolar University; former president, Mindanao State University | Master Business Administration |
| Rey Malonzo | Mayor of Caloocan; Movie actor | A.A. Police Science |
| Reyes Arturo Pacheco | Chief of the Boat, United States Navy; Doctor of Medicine OLFU Fatima College of Medicine Master in General Administration Central Michigan University Candidate: United States Senate Hawaii, USA 2020 Associate of Arts, 1971 University College Public Administration CBEPA, 1972 | [AA, UCM 1971 |
| Reyes, Marcelo Pacheco | Retired Police Officer, Honolulu Police Department; Cum Laude Associate in Police Science PLM, 1971 Cum Laude, Bachelor of Police Science PLM, 1972 | Associate in Police Science, 1971, Bachelor in Police Science, 1972 |
| Isko Moreno | Mayor of Manila; Movie actor | M.A. Public Administration |
| Antonio Eduardo B. Nachura | Associate Justice, Supreme Court of the Philippines; Solicitor-General of the Philippines; Chief Presidential Legal Counsel, Malacañan; President, Government Security Insurance Insurance System; Congressman, 2nd District of Samar | Doctor of Public Management (ETEEAP) |
| Roberto del Rosario | Vice President for Operations, IBC 13 | A.B. Mass Communication, M.A. in Communication Arts (ETEEAP) |
| Raulito Matias | SQL Server DBA Pioneer DXC Technology | B.S. Information Technology |
| Guillerma B. Reyes | Head of the Administrative and Management Office, Presidential Management Staff | A.B. Business Economics and Public Administration |
| Aicelle Santos | Winner of 2006 Astana Song Festival in Kazakhstan; 1st Runner-up in Pinoy Pop Superstar 2; TV personality and Recording artist at GMA Network | B.S. Psychology |
| Jose G. Solis | Congressman, 2nd District of Sorsogon | M.A. Business Administration |
| Emeniano Acain Somoza, Jr. | Writer | A.B. Mass Communication |
| Marietta T. Tamondong | Head of Office of Special Projects, Presidential Management Staff | M.A. Business Administration |

== Honorary graduates ==
Through the years, PLM has conferred the title of Doctor honoris causa (honorary degree) upon individuals in recognition of their contributions to the development of Philippine society through achievements in their own fields of endeavor.

| Honoree | Post | Honoris causa conferred |
|---|---|---|
| Corazon C. Aquino | President, Republic of the Philippines | Doctor of Public Administration |
| Jose "Lito" Atienza Jr. | Secretary, Department of Environment & Natural Resources; former Mayor of Manila | Doctor of Public Administration |
| Josue N. Bellosillo | Senior Associate Justice, Supreme Court of the Philippines | Doctor of Laws |
| Jacobo Clave | Vice-Governor, Pangasinan; Ambassador of the Philippines to Italy | Doctor of Humanities |
| Aurora Cudal | Woman of the Year (March 1999), California Assemblywoman Denise Moreno Ducheny | Doctor of Humanities |
| Daisaku Ikeda | Founder of Soka University, Tokyo, Japan | Doctor of Humanities |
| Alfredo S. Lim | Philippine Senator and mayor, Manila | Doctor of Public Administration |
| Linda C. Lingle | Governor, Hawaii, USA | Doctor of Public Management |
| Loren Legarda | Philippine Senator | Doctor of Humanities |
| Bongbong Marcos | President, Republic of the Philippines | Doctor of Laws |
| Andres R. Narvasa | Philippine Supreme Court Chief Justice | Doctor of Laws |
| Wiliam B. Norrie | Chancellor of the University of Manitoba | Doctor of Public Management |
| Gavin Newsom | Mayor, San Francisco, California | Doctor of Public Management |
| José "Pepe" R. Rodriguez | Author, journalist and diplomat; Head of the Instituto Cervantes | Doctor of Humanities |
| Jovito Salonga | Philippine Senate President, Educator and Statesman | Doctor of Laws |
| Emilio Yap III | Director, Manila Bulletin | Doctor of Business Administration, 2010 |

== Alumni in fiction ==
The table presents the partial list of fictional characters associated with the PLM as depicted in works of art.

| Name | Art Description vis-a-vis PLM | Fictional Degree |
|---|---|---|
| Melinda Santiago | A fictional character (played by Alessandra de Rossi) in Mga Munting Tinig | B.S. Education |
