= Child labor in the Philippines =

Child labor in the Philippines is the employment of children in hazardous occupations below the age 15, or without the proper conditions and requirements below the age of 15, where children are compelled to work on a regular basis to earn a living for themselves and their families, and as a result are disadvantaged educationally and socially. So to make it short, it is called child labor when it is forced.

In 2012, the National Statistics Office reported that there were around 5.5 million child laborers aged 5–17 in the country, around 2.1 million of whom were exposed to environments that are considered hazardous. The International Labour Organization estimated that 55.3% of these children undertake hazardous work in agriculture.

The Philippines was committed to the United Nations Sustainable Development Goal of ending child labor by 2025. However, despite considerable progress, this has not yet occurred as of 2026. Under the Philippines Development Plan, the country attempted to remove 2 million children from hazardous child work by 2022. The Philippine Statistics Authority estimated that 861,000 children 5 to 17 years old were working in 2024.

== Definitions ==
Republic Act No. 7610, known as the Special Protection of Children Against Abuse, Exploitation, and Discrimination Act, gives the following definitions:

- Children – refers to persons below 18 years of age or those over but are unable to fully take care of themselves or protect themselves from abuse, neglect, cruelty, exploitation or discrimination because of a physical or mental disability/condition. (Section 3)
- Child labor – refers to the illegal employment of children below the age of 15, where they are not directly under the sole responsibility of their parents or legal guardian, or the latter employs other workers apart from their children, who are not members of their families, or their work endangers their life, safety, health and morals or impairs their normal development including schooling. This also extends to the situation of children below the age of 18 who are employed in hazardous occupations. (Section 12)

The joint project of the Philippine National Statistics Office and International Labour Organization made distinctions on the kinds of work that children are subjected to.

=== Hazardous work ===
- Chemical – work involves exposure to: dust (e.g. silica, dust, standing dust), liquid (e.g. oil, gasoline, mercury), mist, fumes, or vapors (e.g. paint, insecticides or pesticide spraying), gas (e.g. oxygen, ammonia), etc.
- Physical – work involves exposure to: noise, temperature or humidity, pressure, inadequate illumination or lighting, slip, trip, or fall hazards, insufficient exit for prompt escape, congested lay-out, radiation, ultraviolet, or microwave, etc.
- Biological – work involves exposure to: viral, bacterial, fungal, parasitic (e.g. drinking water affected with amoeba), etc.

=== Permissible work ===
Children are allowed to undertake work under certain conditions.

- A child below 15 years old can be permitted to work if he/she is under supervision by family senior/ parents provided that the child works directly under the sole responsibility of his/her parents or legal guardian and where only members of his/her family are employed.
- The child's employment does not endangers his/her life, safety, health, and morals, or impairs his/her normal development.
- The parent or legal guardian shall provide the said child with the prescribed primary and/or secondary education.
- The employer first secures a work permit for the child from the Department of Labor and Employment (DOLE).

Children aged 15 to below 18 years of age are permitted to work in any economic activity not considered child labor, but not more than 8 hours a day and in no case beyond 40 hours a week. They shall not be allowed to work between 10:00 P.M. and 6:00 A.M. of the following day, and employer should provide the child with access to at least elementary and secondary education.

== Current status ==
In its report Findings on the Worst Forms of Child Labor in 2013, the U.S. Department of Labor estimated the percentage of working children aged 5 to 14 to be around 11% which corresponds to about 2,180 million children. 65% of these children were found in the agricultural sector, 5% in the industrial sector and 29% engaged in domestic service. The 2014 List of Goods Produced by Child Labor or Forced Labor reported 13 goods produced exclusively by child labor in the Philippines. These included 8 agricultural goods (namely sugarcane, bananas, coconuts, corn, hogs, rice, rubber, and tobacco). Gold mining, pornography and pyrotechnics complete the list.

== Statistics ==
=== Working children ===
Working Children 5 to 17 Years Old.

| Year | Number | Percentage |
|---|---|---|
| 2022 | 1.48M | 4.7% |
| 2023 | 1.09M | 3.5% |
| 2024 | .861M | 2.7% |

== Philippine legislation on child labor ==
=== Historical evolution of child labor laws in the Philippines ===
The concern for the welfare of children being employed to work started in the Philippines as early as 1923. The American colonial government of that time enacted the very first set of rules and regulations in the country regarding child labor through Act No. 3071, also known as "An Act to Regulate the Employment of Women and Children in Shops, Factories, Industrial, Agricultural and Mercantile Establishments, and Other Place of Labor in the Philippine Islands, to Provide Penalties for Violations Hereof and for Other Purposes". The enforcement of this law was eventually overseen by the Woman and Child Labor Section of the Inspection Division of the then Bureau of Labor in 1925. When the Philippines declared independence from American rule in 1946, all existing laws enacted under the former regime were replaced by Republic Acts. Act No. 3071 was renamed R.A. 695 thereafter and the implementation was entrusted to the Women and Minors Division of the former Bureau of Labor Standards, in 1957.

In 1932, the Philippines enacted into law to codify its penal laws, they came to be known as the Revised Penal Code (RPC). The RPC contains several provisions barring certain types of child work, such as "Exploitation of Child Labor" (Article 273) which prohibits an employer from retaining a child worker in service against his or her will under the pretext of reimbursing a debt incurred by the child's ascendants. The PRC also includes a clause regarding the "Exploitation of Minors" (Article 278). This provision prohibits the employment of a minor less than 16 years of age in what the code describes as "dangerous exhibits". Other provisions of the RPC relating to slavery, prostitution, corruption, illegal detention, and kidnapping of minors are all applicable to child workers. The RPC remains in effect to this day in the Philippines.

Two years after Philippine independence from American control, the Republic became a member state of the International Labour Organization on 15 June 1948. Since then, the Philippines have ratified a number of international conventions adopted by ILO, relating to child labor. The country first ratified in 1953, ILO Convention No. 90, which prohibits the employment of children in industry during night time and in 1960, the government ratified ILO Convention No. 59, which fixes the minimum age of employment for industry at 15 years. The convention, however, allows younger workers to be employed in undertakings which only members of the employer's family are employed, but only if the work in question is not a danger to the life, health, or morals of the children employed. ILO Convention No. 77, which requires the medical examination and subsequent re-examination of children as a prerequisite for their employment, was also put into effect in 1960. The ILO Convention No. 138 or the Minimum Age Convention of 1973 was not ratified in the Philippines until 1998.

During Martial Law, a handful of Presidential Decrees (P.D.'s) were enforced concerning child labor laws in the Philippines. One of which is P.D. no. 148 which amended R.A. 679, the Woman and Child Labor Law. The new decree simplified the complex provisions of R.A. 679 regarding confusing age limits imposed by this law under different types of undertakings allowing "any person between 14 and 18 years of age may be employed in any non-hazardous undertaking." P.D. no 148 was in direct disagreement with ILO Convention No. 59. The new law didn't last that long since only a year after, P.D. no 148 was amended by the passage of P.D. no 442, otherwise known as the Labor Code. The new law raised the minimum age of employment from 14 to 15 years old, and has maintained the previous minimum age for hazardous undertakings at 18 years old. The Labor Code failed, however, to include the terms and conditions of employment of children previously provided by R.A. 679, as amended by P.D. no. 148 creating a huge gap in the new law. This was eventually addressed through P.D. 603 or the Child and Youth Welfare Code, a codification of different provisions for the well-being of all children.

=== Child labor laws in the Philippines ===
After the fall of the Marcos regime in 1986, increasing demands for reforms in government policies, legislation and programs affecting children made the government respond by ratifying the United Nations Convention on the Rights of the Child (CRC) on 26 July 1990. The CRC entered into force as an international agreement on 2 September 1990. The convention directs the ratifying countries to "recognize the right of the child to be protected from economic exploitation and from performing any work that is likely to be hazardous or to interfere with the child's education, or to be harmful to the child's health or physical, mental, spiritual, moral or social development".

To comply with the mandate of the CRC, the government enacted R.A. 7610, "An Act Providing for Stronger Deterrence and Special Protection of Children Against Abuse, Exploitation, and Discrimination, Providing Penalties for its Violation and for Other Purposes" on 17 June 1992. Initially, the act was lauded for its innovation in promoting child welfare, especially those found in extremely difficult situations. However, the act was also severely criticized because of how its provisions severely changed existing policies regarding Child labor laws. Article VIII, Section 12, of R.A. 7610 legalized the employment of all children below 15 years of age, but only if the employer is able to secure a working permit from the Department of Labor and Employment (DOLE).

Public opinion and international organizations like the ILO and the UNICEF, along with the local Department of Justice pushed to amend R.A. 7610, Article VII, Section 12, as it was in flagrant violation of ILO convention no. 59. A new law called R.A. 7658 or "An Act Prohibiting the Employment of Children below 15 Years of Age in Public and Private Undertakings" was passed in October 1993 for this purpose. R.A. 7658 allows only two exceptions to the prohibition on employment below the minimum age, first for the concerned child to "work directly under the sole responsibility of the child's parents or legal guardian and where only members of the employer's family are employed" and second, "where a child's employment in public entertainment or information through cinema, theater, radio or television is essential". Additionally, the new law requires the employers to first secure for the child a work permit from the DOLE before the child can begin to work.

In 2003, the Philippines passed a new law known as R.A. 9231 or the "Special Protection of Children Against Child Abuse, Exploitation and Discrimination Act". This law specifically limits the employment of children below 15 years old, with the same exceptions as R.A. 7658, with additional provisions regarding restrictions on the number of hours children are allowed to work, provisions on expanding working children's access to education, social, medical, and legal assistance.

=== Laws and regulations related to child labor ===
| Standard | Yes/No | Age | Related Legislation |
|---|---|---|---|
| Minimum age of work | Yes | 15 | Labor Code; an act instituting policies for the protection and welfare of domestic workers |
| Minimum age for hazardous work | Yes | 18 | Labor Code |
| List of hazardous occupations prohibited for children | Yes | - | Republic Act No. 679, as further amended by Presidential Decree No. 148, Woman and Child Labor Law, Department Order 4 |
| Prohibition of forced labor | Yes | - | Expanded Anti-Trafficking in Persons Act of 2012, Republic Act No. 10364 |
| Prohibition of child trafficking | Yes | - | Act providing for the elimination of the worst forms of child labor and affording stronger protection for the working child, Republic Act No. 9231; Expanded Anti-Trafficking in Persons Act of 2012; Special Protection of Children Against Abuse, Exploitation and Discrimination Act |
| Prohibition of commercial sexual exploitation of children | Yes | - | Act providing for the elimination of the worst forms of child labor and affording stronger protection for the working child; Special Protection of Children Against Abuse, Exploitation and Discrimination Act; Anti-Child Pornography Act of 2009, Republic Act No. 9775; Cybercrime Prevention Act |
| Prohibition of using children in illicit activities | Yes | - | Act providing for the elimination of the worst forms of child labor and affording stronger protection for the working child, Republic Act No. 9231; Special Protection of Children Against Abuse, Exploitation and Discrimination Act; Comprehensive Dangerous Drugs Act |
| Minimum age for compulsory military recruitment | Yes | 18 | Memorandum Circular No. 13 on Selective Enlistment/Reenlistment of the Department of National Defense and the Armed Forces of the Philippines; Special Protection of Children Against Abuse, Exploitation and Discrimination Act |
| Minimum age for voluntary military service | Combat: / Yes; Non-combat: / Yes | 18/17 | Memorandum Circular No. 13 on Selective Enlistment/Reenlistment of the Department of National Defense and the Armed Forces of the Philippines; 2003 Declaration on Ratifying the Optional Protocol |
| Compulsory education age | Yes | 18 | Enhanced Basic Education Act of 2013 |
| Free public education | Yes | - | Philippine Constitution |

Despite government efforts on amendments and ratification of laws and policies regarding child labor, the present policies and legislation responsible for the protection and rights of child workers in the Philippines still remain scattered among the different laws of the country.

== Causes and effects ==
There are different reasons to why children are pushed to work below the legal age of 18. Listed below are some of the main problems.

=== Causes ===
==== Poverty ====
According to a survey conducted by the Philippine Statistics Authority or the NSCB in 2009 and released in 2011, 26.5% of the Filipino population is considered poor. This amounts to 23.1 million Filipinos who live below the poverty threshold. The poverty threshold refers to the minimum income a family or individual must earn in order to be considered "not poor". An individual is considered poor if he or she is below the annual per capita poverty threshold of P16,871. Recent research cites that poverty incidence among Filipino families have been increasing. Poverty incidence percentage declined from 21% in 2006 to 20.5% in 2009 and to 19.7% in 2012; however due to growing population the number of families rose from 3.8 million to 4.03 million and to 4.2 million respectively. Furthermore, a family of five would need an average of P7,890 to cover basic food and non-food needs.

The widespread poverty and unemployment rates in the country means that poor or low-income households are vulnerable to income and employment shocks. Lacking in physical assets that may be sold or offered as collateral in order to reduce or prevent interruptions to their income streams, poor households may resort to sending their younger members to work as a risk-reducing strategy. Especially during economic downturns when adult unemployment is rising and incomes are falling, child work provides a way for augmenting household incomes. It is thus reasonable to expect that the incidence of child labor will be higher among poor households than non-poor households and that such incidence should rise especially during periods of economic slowdown or decline.

==== Educational status ====
In a study done by Anna Leah Colina for Ecumenical Institute for Labor Education and Research (EILER),

The study, which involved 3,859 households, found that children from poor families "are being forced by necessity to augment the family's coffers by working". Leaving school and working is a decision forced upon children by the reality they face each day, the study added. It further revealed that 96 percent of the households surveyed are living below the poverty threshold of their regions. At least 78 percent of respondents said they do not own or have access to land. Instead, most rely on other means to earn a living such as working in mines and plantations. Colina said a lack of access to education is also a "one push factor" to child labor. She said 60 percent of child laborers did not reach the sixth grade, while 44 percent reached Grade 6 before they left school to work.

This study has shown that most children are either forced to work at an early age or just work to have a steady income to help their families in their financial situations.

=== Effects ===
==== Educational ====
Based on the result of the 2013 Functional Literacy, Education and Mass media survey facilitated by the National Statistic Office, 10.6% of ages 6–24 of the country's population is out of school. One of the top reasons is poverty. Insufficient income to sustain schooling constitutes 19.2% of the out of school youth. Another alarming sign is that lack of interest which constitutes to 19.1%. Lastly, 5.5% of both male and female youths are out of school because they are either employed or looking for work. These factors affect the kids as they try to help their families earn more that resulted to the negligence of their education.

A study indicated that school attendance among child workers tends to be sacrificed. Although schooling can be combined with work in many instances, various factors like poverty and the conditions of work may prevent working children from either attending school or benefiting to any significant degree from doing so. Children laboring under hazardous conditions are also at great risk of getting injured or contracting various diseases. Psychological and emotional problems have also been noted among children working under extreme conditions. These effects have implications on the future productive capacity and earning potential of working children. The failure to invest in human capital now means that the working children of today will be the impoverished parents of tomorrow, bearing children who like them will also be pushed prematurely into the labor market to make ends meet. Child labor, especially the worst forms, tends to reproduce the very same conditions that brought it about.

The relationship between child work, bad performance at school, and eventual non-attendance can take various routes as illustrated in many documented cases. In general, time divided between work and studying does not permit a child to focus on the latter, causing him to fall behind with his lessons and to get low grades. Conditions of work are, therefore, critical as they can affect a child's readiness to tackle schoolwork.

==== Health and abuse ====
Continuous exposure to various hazards in their work environments, especially chemical and biological ones that are invisible, places children's health and lives at great risk. While adults working under the same conditions face similar risks, an argument for minimum health and safety regulations would pose that children are especially vulnerable to work-related illnesses. Their yet undeveloped biological processes make their bodies less resistant to the chemicals and other toxic substances they are regularly exposed to. The lack of proper nutrition, so characteristic among the poor, moreover increases the vulnerability of working children to both the short, and long-term debilitating effects of work, which can cut short economically productive life.

== Government organizations ==
The following agencies, DOLE, DSWD, and CWC collaborate on programs to reduce the number of child labor cases and protect children in the Philippines.

=== Primary agency ===
==== Department of Labor and Employment ====
The Department of Labor and Employment (DOLE) is the national government agency responsible for formulating policies, the implementation of programs, and they serve as the policy-coordinating program arm of the Executive Branch in the labor and employment field. They are leading the networks in the progressive eradication of child labor through protecting, preventing, and removing the children out of the hazardous and exploitative works, which also includes curing and redeeming them back into society. Their projects, programs, and activities are as follows:

1. Philippine Program Against Child Labor (PPACL)
2. Child Labor Prevention and Elimination Program
3. H.E.L.P. M.E. or the Health, Education and training, Livelihood, Protection and prevention, and Monitoring and Evaluation Program
4. Project Angel Tree
5. KaSaMa Program
6. Special Program for the Employment of Students (SPES)
7. Child-Labor Free Barangays

DOLE also enforced national laws such as "The Anti-Trafficking in Persons Act" (R.A. 9208) and "Special Protection of Children Against Child Abuse, Exploitation and Discrimination Act" (R.A. 9231).

===== Philippine Program Against Child Labor =====
The Philippine Program Against Child Labor (PPACL) is the founded from the National Program Against Child Labor (NPACL) framework. Led by the Department of Labor and Employment, the latter framework was established for the period 2001–2004 to combat child labor. The program partners used it as a way to unify the goals, missions, visions, and other points needed of the programs to be established. When the period ended, the National Child Labor Committee added breadth to the framework by identifying new objectives that would help sustain the environment NPACL fostered and continue preventing the progressing situation of child labor in the Philippines.

In order to protect children and their rights, they proposed seven objectives to influence action:

- Create a database system that upholds relevant information on the current events and news on child labor. This database system should be remained updated, inviting stakeholders and program partners to continually add significant studies and other resources.
- Ensure the role of the PPACL in all of the different partnerships and organizations geared to fight against child labor. This will help create a more responsive National Child Labor Committee.
- Engage the committee by creating awareness of the prevalent child labor issue through encouraging them to participate in the advocacies and other programs established for them.
- Encourage social workers and other entitled workers to participate in the programs to add more quality and authenticity.
- Provide opportunities for children in order to avoid the continuance of child labor while protecting their rights as children.
- Conventionalize the initiatives against child labor to ensure success and better implementation of laws and policies.
- Establish programs within laws and policies attributed and associated to child labor in order to proceed to a more national level, wherein all cities and provinces will be able to access the programs and initiatives.

===== Child Labor Prevention and Elimination Program =====
For further progression in child labor elimination, DOLE established a program called Child Labor Prevention and Elimination Program. To be consistent with the PPACL framework, the objectives of the programs was founded on the framework to promote consistency and efficiency in combating child labor. Its five initiatives are as follows:

- The Child Labor Knowledge Sharing System was created with updated information and resources contributed by 300 and counting users.
- The partnerships were strengthened through restructuring the National Child Labor Committee and its sub-committees, and creating the Sagip Batang Manggagawa Quick Action Team and other initiatives to focus on strengthening the regional committees.
- They provided authentic and effective service through projects such as Kabuhayan para sa Magulang ng Batang Manggagawa (KASAMA) Project, Project Angel Tree, Eliminating Child Labor in the Tobacco Industry (ECLTI) Project, and Integrated Services for Migratory Sugar Workers (I-SERVE SACADAS) Project.
- They strengthened campaigns and intensified implemented projects to promote the normalization of a child labor-free environment.
- Guided by the laws and policies enforced, the programs aided in working through the cases and provided legal actions such as creating the Working Child's Permit and closing establishments that promote child labor.

===== Child Labor-Free Barangays =====
Consistent with the PPACL framework, the project Child Labor-Free Barangay aims to eliminate child labor in the country. Each labor-free barangay will be given a three-year certification and endorsement to DOLE programs once the barangay has completed the criteria and other requirements and submitted the proper documents in being enlisted as child labor-free. They should also have at least four agencies working within their area in order to promote child protection.

====== List of barangays ======
As of 2014, the Child Labor-Free Barangay has already saved 53 barangays in 10 regions:

| Regions | Barangays |
|---|---|
| National Capital Region | Pasong Putik, Quezon City; Bagong Barrio, Caloocan City; Brgy. 176 (Bagong Silang), Caloocan City; Pinagbuhatan, Pasig; Sampaloc, Manila; Sitio Damayan, Manila; Brgy. 91, Manila; Brgy. 109, Manila; Almanza Uno, las Piñas; Brgy. 14 (San Jose), Pasay; Brgy. 201 (Kalayaan), Pasay |
| Cordillera Administrative Region | Pide, Sagada; Tanulong, Sagada; Fidelisan, Sagada; Banga-an, Sagada; Aguid, Sagada; Madongo, Sagada |
| Region 1 | Valbuena, Pinili; Macayo, Alcala |
| Region 3 | Pulong Buhangin, Sta. Maria, Bulacan; Pandacaqui, Mexico, Pampanga |
| Region 4-A | Sta. Maria, Calauag, Batangas; Madulao, Catanauan, Batangas; Sta. Ana, Taytay, Rizal; San Juan, Taytay, Rizal; Mahabang Parang, Angono, Rizal; Kalayaan, Angono, Rizal |
| Negros Island Region (NIR) | Brgy. Canggohob, Mabinay, Negros Oriental; Brgy. Manlingay, Mabinay, Negros Oriental |
| Region 10 | San Jose, Quezon, Bukidnon; Poblacion, Quezon, Bukidnon; Salawagan, Quezon, Bukidnon; Merangeran, Quezon, Bukidnon; Butong, Quezon, Bukidnon |
| Region 11 | Kiblawan, Pasig, Davao del Sur; Kibuaya, Hagonoy, Davao del Sur; Matina Pangi, Davao City, Davao del Sur; New Barili, Maco, Compostela Valley; New Leyte, Maco, Compostela Valley |
| Region 12 | Kematu, T’boli, South Cotabato; Poblacion, Malungon, Saranggani; Libi, Malapatan, Saranggani; Colon, Maasim, Saranggani; Bula, Gen. Santos City; City Heights, Gen. Santos City; Poblacion, Tacurong, Sultan Kudarat; EJC Montilla, Tacurong, Sultan Kudarat; Saguing, Makilala, North Cotabato; Presbitero, Pigcawayan, North Cotabato; Poblacion Mother, Cotabato City; Rosary Heights 2, Cotabato City |
| Caraga | Doongan, Butuan City, Agusan Del Norte; Las Navas, Prosperidad, Agusan Del Sur |

===== HELP ME Convergence Program Against Child Labor =====
HELP ME Convergence Program Against Child Labor aims to provide converged strategies to address issues concerning child labor. HELP ME stands for: H for Health services; E for Education and training, L for Livelihood opportunities for people involved; P for Prevention, protection, and prosecution; M for Monitoring; and E for Evaluation. It is founded by Cabinet's Human Development and Poverty Reduction Cluster (HDPRC) together with President Benigno S. Aquino III., Department of Labor and Employment, and Department of Social Welfare and Development. The whole program will keep in line through the following objectives: keeping a monitoring system for the child laborers and the services provided to them, delivering services fitting to the situations of the child laborers, and finally, collaborating with different departments and program partners such as DOLE, DSWD, DepEd, DOH, DILG, DA, DOJ, TESDA, NEDA, CWC, PIA and NCIP.

Implemented in 2013 to 2016, the program aimed to eliminate child labor by 75%, or more specifically, to move out at least 893,000 children from the worst forms of child labor.

===== Project Angel Tree =====
Introduced by the Bureau of Women and Young Workers, the Project Angel Tree connects child laborers and stakeholders who wish to protect their rights. This project contributes to the Child Labor Prevention and Elimination Program. The project aims to create an "Angel Tree Community", wherein donors grant the "wishes" of child laborers. The project helps give child laborers access to resources. As of 2010, Project Angel Tree had helped 15,902 victims of child labor in the country.

===== Philippine National Strategic Framework for Plan Development for Children =====
Philippine National Strategic Framework for Plan Development for Children, otherwise known as Child 21, serves as a guide for initiatives and programs to promote and protect the rights of the children. The framework includes activities and strategies to provide child-friendly environments, education, protection from threats including sexual exploitation, child labor, and child-trafficking, and other modes of development for children.

=== Secondary agencies ===
==== Department of Social Welfare and Development ====
The Department of Social Welfare and Development (DSWD) provides direction to groups that implement social welfare and development services. It provides social and therapeutic services to former child laborers and helps them reintegrate with their families.

==== Council for the Welfare of Children ====
The Council for the Welfare of Children advocates against the trafficking of children. It develops strategic frameworks for adoption by local government units. It does not directly implement programs for children; it supports other agencies and service providers.

== Non-government organizations ==
=== Kamalayan Development Foundation ===
In 1995–1997, with the help of International Labour Organization (ILO) and United Nations Children's Fund (UNICEF), Kamalayan Development Foundation progressed from Kamalayan Development Center through establishing anti-child recruitment agencies in Davao City, Cebu City, and Ormoc City. This started numerous initiatives which granted children freedom from work enslavement. The organization founded rescue operations, participated in governmental and international campaigns and advocacy activities, imprisoned child labors, and finally, identified and rescued child laborers in plantations, factories, prostitution facilities, and other exploitative locations. The Kamalayan Development Foundation seeks to expand nationwide through the continuous support of ILO.

=== Visayan Forum Foundation Inc. ===
As a child laborer herself, Ma. Cecilia Flores-Oebanda spearheaded the Visayan Forum Foundation Inc. (VFI) to eradicate slavery and human trafficking. Its actions revolve around providing residential care to victims, mainly women and children, of difficult circumstances such as exploitation and child labor. The organization has established programs such as:

- Centers of Hope: These are safe houses that aim to provide protection and shelter to girl-children and women victims.
- iFight Movement: This movement seeks to train, equip, and empower the youth with a better mentality for change and information on fighting against human trafficking.
- Policy and Advocacy Resource Center: This provides volunteers and partners a space to share information in order to develop the current campaigns and update information on the current environment on human trafficking and domestic work.
- Ventures for Freedom: This educates and provides communities innovative strategies in order to stray away from the possibility of human trafficking and domestic work, tackling the cause to prevent the problem from progressing.

== International partnerships ==
=== International Labour Organization ===
In 1948, the Philippines joined the International Labour Organization (ILO) and has remained one of the active participants in its advocacy. As the country face problems on employment, more specifically, child labor, the partnership paved way to projects that will help in the elimination of child labor. The organization supports the country through promoting growth and developing their skills through quality education, especially for the children who remain victims to employment.

Its social partners include the DOLE, Employers Confederation of the Philippines (ECOP), Alliance of Progressive Labor (APL), Associated Labor Unions-TUCP (ALU-TUCP), Federation of Free Workers (FFW), Kilusang Mayo Uno (KMU), Public Services Labor Independent Confederation (PSLINK) and Trade Union Congress of the Philippines (TUCP).

==== International Programme on the Elimination of Child Labour ====
International Programme on the Elimination of Child Labour varies from one country after another. It aims to eliminate child labor in its different sectors, such as direct action, advocacy and awareness, institutional development, social services and poverty alleviation, and legislation and policy development.

=== ChildFund Philippines ===
In 1971, ChildFund began by partnering with religious organizations, and eventually, the communities in the Philippines. The organization targets children vulnerable to exploitation and child labor and builds a community that would ensure their safety and protection. Each year, they contribute $8 million to their partnerships worldwide, including the Philippines, directly helping over 250,000 children.

ChildFund is notable for two projects: Child Protection Committees (CPCs) protects children from dangerous and harmful acts such as bullying, child abuse, exploitation, and other measures in schools; while Conditional Socialized Education Assistance provides educational assistance to children.

In 2013, their target provinces were: Ifugao, Benguet, Baguio City, Mountain Province, Quezon, Batangas, Laguna, National Capital Region (Metro Manila), Sorsogon, Camarines Sur, Capiz, Iloilo, Negros Occidental, Cebu, Ormoc, Misamis Oriental, North Cotobato, South Cotobato, Cotobato, Maguindanao, Sulu, Zamboanga del Norte.

=== World Vision Development Foundation, Inc. ===
World Vision Development Foundation Inc. performs through partnering with Christians all over the world to seek justice and promote human welfare through various activities and programs such as spreading awareness, changing unjust structures, and transforming the youth by encouraging involvement and protecting their rights. The partnership with organization started when its founder, Robert Willard Pierce, initiated the China Challenge, which led to sponsoring and caring for the poor and needy. It first helped an orphanage called The Good Shepherd's Fold in 1957, and since then, it has continued to move to foster a healthy environment for the children and their families.

==== ABK3 LEAP ====
Pag-Aaral ng Bata para sa Kinabukasan (ABK) LEAP Livelihoods, Education, Advocacy and Protection to Reduce Child Labor in Sugarcane Areas is the third phase of the ABK Initiative that aims to withdraw children from exploitative labor. In four years, 2011–2015, ABK3 LEAP intends to provide education, raise awareness, support research, contribute to the continuous development, and support data collection on child labor. The project mainly focuses on 11 provinces, namely Batangas, Bukidnon, Camarines Sur, Capiz, Cebu, Davao del Sur, Iloilo, Leyte, Negros Occidental, Negros Oriental, and North Cotabato. It targets to provide for 52,000 children at ages 5–17 years old and 25,000 households.

The project is implemented by the following organizations: World Vision Development Foundation Inc., ChiWorld Vision Development Foundation, Inc. ChildFund Philippines, Educational Research and Development Assistance Foundation, Inc. (ERDA), Sugar Industry Foundation, Inc. (SIFI), Community Economic Ventures, Inc. (CEVI), and University of the Philippines Social Action and Research for Development Foundation (UPSARDF).

== See also ==
- Children in jail in Philippines
- Street children in the Philippines

General:

- Human rights in the Philippines
