= Tanggol Wika =

Organization in the Philippines

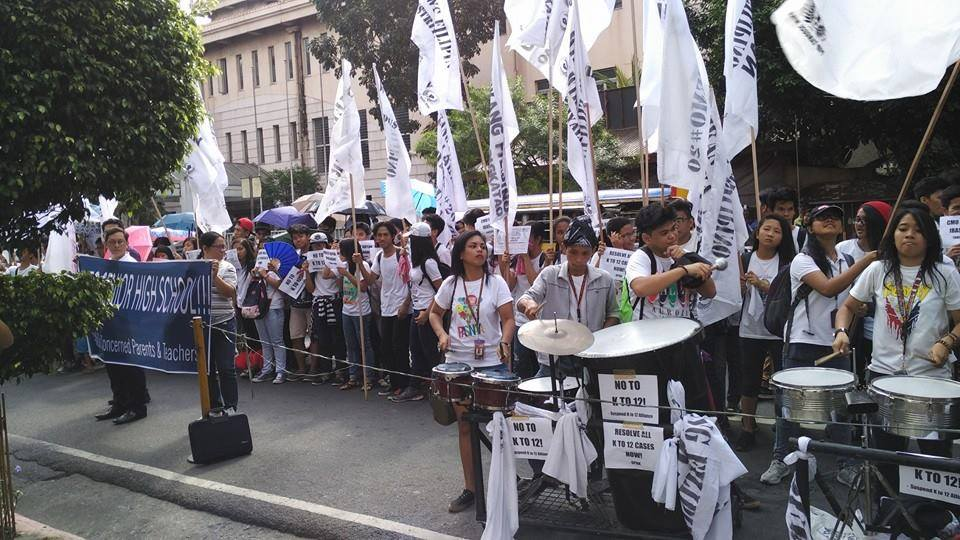
- A rally of members of Tanggol Wika and other groups calling for the junking of the Philippine government's K to 12 program, held in front of the Philippine Supreme Court (2016).
- Formation: 2014; 12 years ago
- Official language: Filipino

Tanggol Wika or Alyansa ng Mga Tagapagtanggol ng Wikang Filipino (Alliance of Defenders of the Filipino Language) is a Philippine-based organization founded in 2014 in an assembly of more than 300 professors, students, writers and cultural activists at the De La Salle University-Manila, as a response to the abolition of formerly mandatory Filipino language subjects in Philippine colleges and universities because of Commission on Higher Education (CHED) Memorandum Order No. 20, Series of 2013, which implements a new General Education Curriculum (GEC) as part and parcel of the Philippine government's adoption of the Kindergarten to 12 years of basic education or K to 12 program.

In its founding manifesto, Tanggol Wika listed the following objectives as its main advocacies: 1) Retain the teaching of Filipino language subjects in the new Philippine General Education Curriculum (GEC) in college; 2) Revise Commission on Higher Education (CHED) Memorandum Order 20. series of 2013; and 3) Use Filipino language as a medium of instruction in different subjects; and 4) Push for nationalistic education in the Philippines.

In 2015, Tanggol Wika filed a Philippine Supreme Court petition (the first-ever petition written in Filipino, which is the Philippines' national language) - backed by partylist groups and various personalities - to stop the implementation of CHED Memorandum Order No. 20, Series of 2013, remarking that it disregards the pro-national language spirit of the framers of the 1987 Philippine Constitution, the same Constitution’s emphasis on nationalism and cultural awareness as core values of Philippine education, and the same Constitution’s pro-labor provisions that give workers – including teachers and workers in the education sector – the right to participate in policy-making activities.

Subsequently, Tanggol Wika scored an initial victory in its legal battle against CHED Memorandum Order No. 20, Series of 2013 when the Philippine Supreme Court issued a temporary restraining order against the said government policy which remains valid until further court orders.

The group pushes for its advocacies through forums, rallies at the CHED office, at the Supreme Court, in Mendiola near Malacañan Palace and other venues, and social media campaigns. Its Facebook page has garnered more than 12,000 likes as of April 2016.

The group called upon politicians to include their advocacy among the issues for the 2016 local and national elections in the Philippines. It actively promotes the Filipino language through social media, and regularly post commentaries on current issues. Recently, it called upon a famous Filipino broadcaster to apologize for "belittling" the Philippine national language when the latter called the language as "bullshitty" as a reaction to a presidential debate conducted in the Filipino language. Many of its convenors also signed a statement (written in Filipino) condemning Senator Bongbong Marcos (a vice-presidential candidate in the 2016 elections) for the latter's portrayal of his father Ferdinand Marcos, Sr.'s dictatorship as an alleged "golden age" of the Philippines. It has also endorsed ACT Teachers Partylist (among the founding organizations of Tanggol Wika) and the senatorial bid of Bayan Muna Rep. Neri Colmenares - a co-signatory in a subsequent Supreme Court petition that challenges the constitutionality of the whole K to 12 system in the Philippines, in the 2016 elections.

The group maintains a current Facebook page called Tanggol Wika, with over 57K followers as of September 2025.
