= Cultural retention =

Preserving the cultural practices of a group

Cultural retention is the act of retaining the culture of a specific ethnic group of people, especially when there is reason to believe that the culture, through inaction, may be lost. Many African-American, European and Asian organizations have cultural retention programs in place.

== Need ==
Cultural retention refers to the attempts made to preserve the cultural practices of a defined group, when many of their other forms and rituals have already been lost. This erosion is seen in minority groups feeling alienated from the dominant majority around them. They may strive to retain their traditional cultural practices because they give them joy and pride. This is also an attempt to prevent or reverse the effects of cultural erasure. Cultural erasure happens when cultural practices and customs are forgotten or abandoned by the community, as they adopt customs from the more dominant cultural group or more modernized practices.

== Examples ==
People generally attempt to preserve their culture with social practices, ritual and festive events that usually mark the seasons, events in the agricultural calendar, or the stages of a person's life. Examples of this are worship rites, birth, wedding, funeral rites; relationship and kinship practices; traditional games and sports. Other facets of life, where cultural retention could be displayed are in everyday day to day life activities. Examples for this are seen in the music, dance, food (cooking practices and traditional recipes), clothing, art and craft, proverbs, special gestures, and modes of formal and informal greetings.

- Accompong Maroons within Jamaica have tried to preserve their West African culture and avoid the European influences.
- Cultural retention can be seen in some Caribbean rituals. E.g., jumping of the broom and throwing of rice during weddings, nine-night celebration before funeral service, carnival and new year celebrations.
- Other examples from Jamaica: In Jamaican music, strong influences are noted of jazz, rhythm and blues and the Rastafari movement, Reggae and Dancehall music are noted. In Jamaican creole language, more influence are noted of Twi and Kwa languages and less of European influence. Storytelling, for e.g. Anansi stories are about a local folk hero that originated from West Africa. Many of the traditional Jamaican stories end with either proverb or riddle.

== Methods ==
Retaining and protecting culture is a conscious and intentional process. Cultural heritage can be categorized under two categories - tangible and intangible. Tangible cultural heritage is something that we can touch, like traditional clothing, tools, artwork, buildings, to name a few. While examples of intangible resources are folklore, social norms, music, language, dance, to name a few. The following are some of the ways that could be practiced for retaining traditional cultural norms.

- Teach traditional language, music, and dance styles to the upcoming generation.
- Participate in cultural activities and events, and social norms.
- Continue the practice of storytelling of folklore to younger generations.
- Families should encourage preparing of traditional cuisines and recipes.
- Media can play a vital role in promoting and preserving culture.
- Cultural heritage could be preserved through museums and through digital storage.
- Formal outlets like theatrical performances, sculptures, paintings and buildings.
- Informal outlets like music and food festivals, celebrations and informal cultural gatherings, craft groups, and others.

== See also ==
- Acculturation, the adoption of a mainstream culture
