= Visayan Academy of Arts and Letters =

Cebuano-language regulator

The Visayan Academy of Arts and Letters (Cebuano: Akademyang Bisaya)) is a Philippine language regulator whose aims are to preserve and to develop the Cebuano language.

In 2009, Akademiyang Bisaya published the first edition of The English-Visayan-Cebuano Dictionary, which took ten years to complete in consultation with other organizations, to standardize Cebuano orthography, grammar, and syntax.

The Academy had a two-year hiatus from 2021 owing to the COVID-19 pandemic, relaunching on 11 February 2023 with a new group of officers. Emiliano de Catalina was appointed president, and Jesus Garcia Jr. as chair.

== See also ==
- List of language regulators
- Sanghiran san Binisaya of the Waray language (defunct)
