= New People's Army rebellion =

Insurgency in the Philippines (1969–present)

- Part of the Cold War (until 1991) and the civil conflict in the Philippines
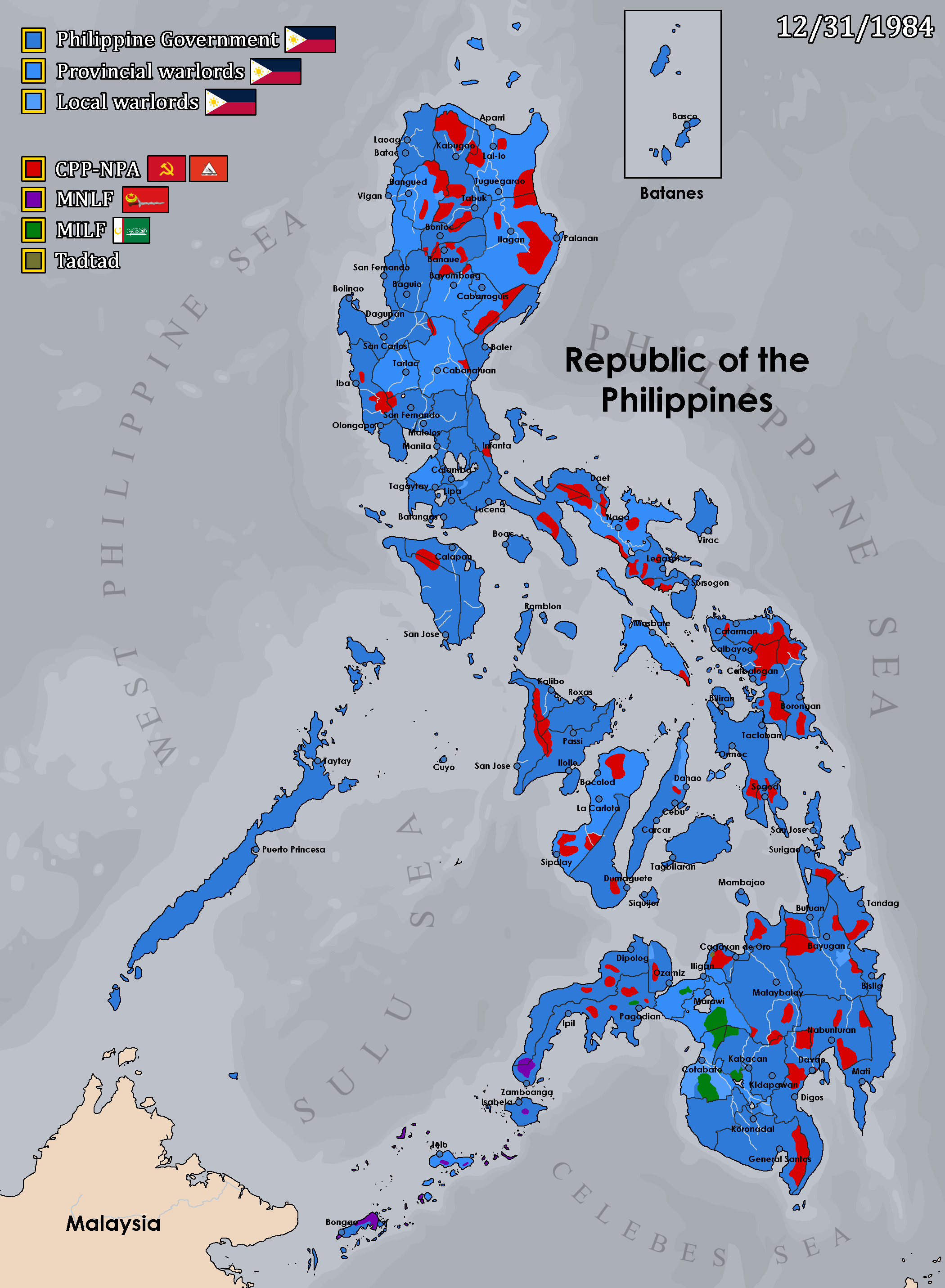
- Map of Maoist control (red) in the Philippines at the height of the insurgency in 1984.
Date	March 29, 1969 – present (57 years, 7 months and 2 days)
Location	Philippines
Status	Ongoing: NTF-ELCAC implemented; CPLA dissolved; Multiple smaller factions undergoing peace processes

Commanders and leaders
Civilian leaders Bongbong Marcos; Gilbert Teodoro; Jonvic Remulla Military; Antonio Nafarrete; James N. Rowe X Police; Jose Melencio Nartatez; Bernard M. Banac...full list	CPP leaders; Jose Maria Sison #; Fidel Agcaoili #; Luis Jalandoni #; NPA commanders; Benito Tiamzon †; Wilma Austria † Gregorio Rosal #; Jorge Madlos †; Jaime Padilla (POW)...full list

Units involved
Government of the Philippines; Armed Forces of the Philippines; Army; CAFGU; Scout Rangers; Air Force; Navy; Marine Corps; Philippine National Police; SAF	Communist Party of the Philippines; New People's Army; MRLO; Rejectionists (since 1992): KR-MR rejectionists; Alex Boncayao Brigade (until 1997); PMP-APP (2002-late 2000s); RPM-P (1995-2000); Revolutionary Proletarian Army (1996-1997); RPA–ABB (1997-2000); MLPP (since 1998) (current activity uncertain); RHB; PMLP (2001-late 2000s); Partisano; RPM-M (2001-2005); CPLA (1986-2011)

Strength
150,000 (AFP); 228,000 (PNP)	785 (NPA, claimed by NTF-ELCAC)

Casualties and losses
- 40,000 killed since 1969 (all sides)

The New People's Army rebellion (often shortened to NPA rebellion) is an ongoing armed conflict between the government of the Philippines and the New People's Army, the armed wing of the Marxist–Leninist–Maoist Communist Party of the Philippines. It is the most prominent communist armed conflict in the Philippines, with more than 43,000 insurgency-related fatalities between 1969 and 2008. It is also one of the longest ongoing communist insurgencies in the world.

Due to the involvement of the National Democratic Front of the Philippines, the legal wing of the CPP, in the conflict, it is also called the CPP–NPA–NDF conflict, or simply the C/N/N conflict, especially in the context of peace talks with the Philippine government.

The history of the rebellion can be traced back to March 29, 1969, when Jose Maria Sison's newly formed CPP entered an alliance with a small armed group led by Bernabe Buscayno. Buscayno's group, which was originally a unit under the same Marxist–Leninist 1930s-era Partido Komunista ng Pilipinas-1930 with which Sison had split, was renamed the New People's Army and became the armed wing of the CPP. Less than two years later, President Ferdinand Marcos introduced martial law, leading to the radicalization of many young people and a rapid growth of the CPP-NPA.

In 1992, the NPA split into two factions: the reaffirmist faction, led by Sison, and the rejectionist faction, which advocated the formation of larger military units and urban insurgencies. Several smaller insurgent groups eventually emerged from the split. This includes the Marxist–Leninist Revolutionary Workers' Party rebellion and the rebellion of the Marxist–Leninist Party of the Philippines and its armed wing, the Rebolusyonaryong Hukbong Bayan, which broke away from the Communist Party of the Philippines in 1998 and has since been in conflict with both the government and the CPP. Prior to the 1992 split, there had been one other significant splinter group – the Cordillera People's Liberation Army which had chosen to put greater emphasis on regional autonomy for the Cordillera region.

The year 2022 was marked with the deaths of Sison and the husband-and-wife duo of Benito and Wilma Tiamzon, the latter two being the alleged leaders of the NPA. By 2024, the number of active communist rebels was noted to have dropped to just over 1,000 amidst a gradual weakening of the rebellion and the restarting of peace talks with the government.

== Background ==
=== Formation of the Communist Party of the Philippines (1968) ===
The original Partido Komunista ng Pilipinas-1930 (lit. 'Communist Party of the Philippines-1930'; PKP) was established in 1930 by members of the Partido Obrero de Filipinas and the Socialist Party of the Philippines with the help of the COMINTERN. It would later lead an anti-Japanese Hukbalahap Rebellion in 1942 with the Hukbong Bayan Laban sa Hapon. During World War II, these communist guerrillas fought against both the Japanese and other guerrilla bands. In the years following, Maoist factions began organizing mass organizations such as Kabataang Makabayan, Malayang Kilusan ng Kababaihan and hosting theoretical studies on Marxism–Leninism–Maoism. They would eventually break off from the old party and form the Communist Party of the Philippines/Marxist–Leninist–Maoist in 1968.

=== Founding of the New People's Army (1969) ===
The New People's Army was established by Jose Maria Sison and Bernabe Buscayno as the armed wing of the CPP-MLM. The new Maoist leadership would drop the reformist ideas that led the CPP-1930 to collaborate with the government of Ferdinand Marcos, and enforce Maoist principles, aimed at creating a socialist state through New Democracy by launching a people's war. Its initial strength was estimated to compromise approximately 60 guerrillas and 35 weapons.

== History ==
=== Formative years of the NPA (1969–1972) ===
==== Initial strength and tactics ====
When Buscayno's forces became the NPA in 1969, they were reported to have only 60 guerrillas and 35 World War II-era guns.

At first, the NPA tried to follow the Maoist military doctrine of "establishing stable base areas", but this was abandoned when their forces took heavy casualties in Northern Luzon, in favor of dispersing their forces.

The NPA's stockpile of weaponry allegedly grew to 60 guns, but all 60 of these guns were lost in an encounter against the Armed Forces of the Philippines, and they were not able to regain firepower until the defection of Lt. Victor Corpus and the 1970 PMA Armory raid.

==== December 1970 PMA Armory raid ====
The NPA was finally able to regain weaponry on December 29, 1970, when Philippine Military Academy instructor Lt. Victor Corpus defected to the CPP-NPA and led a raid on the PMA armory, timing the raid when most cadets were out on Christmas vacation and the PMA's senior officers including its superintendent, General Ugalde, had left the camp to meet President Ferdinand Marcos upon his scheduled arrival in nearby Baguio City. Corpus, who was PMA's designated officer of the day (OOD), guided the NPA raiding team which managed to escape with Browning automatic rifles, carbines, machine guns, and various other weapons and ammunition.

==== Exaggeration of the situation by the Marcos administration ====
Even on September 23, 1972, when Martial Law was announced, the Philippine National Security Council did not see the NPA as a major threat. Just a few days earlier on September 19, 1972, the council's threat assessment was "between 'normal' and 'Internal Defense Condition 1'", the highest being condition "3." One of the generals serving under General Fabian Ver of the National Intelligence and Security Authority later recalled that "Even when Martial Law was declared, the communists were not a real threat. The military could handle them."

Despite the small size of the NPA at the time, the Marcos administration hyped up its formation, supposedly because this would help build up political and monetary support from the US, which was caught up in red scare paranoia at the time. As a result, as security specialist Richard J. Kessler notes, the administration "mythologized the group, investing it with a revolutionary aura that only attracted more supporters."

==== First incidents of violence ====
There are two nominated dates which are said to have marked the first tactical operations of the New People's army - one in 1971 based on the narratives of retired Brig. General Victor Corpus, and another in 1974 based on the narrative out forward by the NPA itself.

According to Corpus, the first act of violence taken by the NPA was the Plaza Miranda bombing which took place on August 21, 1971. Corpus alleges that it was NPA cadres who threw three grenades onto the stage at a Liberal Party rally in Manila, killing nine people and injuring 95 others.

This has been disputed in numerous historical texts, which blame President Ferdinand Marcos as the perpetrator of the bombing. Jose Maria Sison continuously denied that he and the Communist Party of the Philippines were responsible for the bombing up to his death.

More recently, historian Joseph Scalice has argued that while the Marcos government was allied with the Partido Komunista ng Pilipinas (PKP) in carrying out other bombings throughout the early 1970s, "the evidence of history now overwhelmingly suggests that the Communist Party of the Philippines, despite being allied with the Liberal Party, was responsible for this bombing, seeing it as a means of facilitating repression which they argued would hasten revolution." Relying on small armed community-based propaganda units, the NPA found itself in an all-out rebellion by 1972.

The first tactical operation acknowledged by the NPA would not take place until 1974, two years after Ferdinand Marcos declared Martial Law. This took place in Calbiga, Samar, where the NPA ambushed an Army scout patrol and seized a number of their weapons.

=== Rapid growth of the NPA under the Marcos martial law era (1972–1986) ===
Largely due to Marcos' heavy crackdown on protests and activism during the very early 1970s, the New People's Army underwent rapid growth from 1972 during the period of martial law under Ferdinand Marcos.

==== Marcos crackdown and activist radicalization (1970-1972) ====
The social unrest of 1969 to 1970, and the violent dispersals of the resulting "First Quarter Storm" protests were among the early watershed events in which large numbers of Filipino students of the 1970s were radicalized against the Marcos administration. Due to this crackdown, many students who had previously held "moderate" positions (i.e., calling for legislative reforms) became convinced that they had no choice but to call for more radical social change.

Other watershed events that would later radicalize many otherwise "moderate" opposition members include the February 1971 Diliman Commune; the August 1971 suspension of the writ of habeas corpus in the wake of the Plaza Miranda bombing; the September 1972 declaration of Martial Law; the 1980 murder of Macli-ing Dulag; and the August 1983 assassination of Ninoy Aquino.

This radicalization led to a significant growth of the CPP and of the New People's Army under the Marcos administration. Writer and peace advocate Gus Miclat cites the example of Mindanao: "There was not one NPA cadre in Mindanao in 1972. Yes, there were activists, there were some firebrands... but there were no armed rebels then except for those that eventually formed the Moro National Liberation Front. When Marcos fled in 1986, the NPA was virtually in all Mindanao provinces, enjoying even a tacit alliance with the MNLF."

The parallel Moro insurgency created favorable conditions for the development of NPA. During the 1970s, 75% of the Philippine military was deployed on the island of Mindanao, a Moro stronghold, despite the 1976 peace deal between the government and MILF. As of 2000, 40% of the AFP troops continued to engage Moro rebels.

==== Establishment of the National Democratic Front (1973) ====
The National Democratic Front was established in 1973 as the political front of the CPP-MLM, bringing together broad revolutionary organizations which accepted their 12-point program, and building international relations with foreign communist parties such as the Communist Party of India (Maoist) and Communist Party of Nepal (Maoist).

==== Abandonment of the Mao "Base Area" strategy (1974) ====
By 1974, the NPA realized that following Mao's doctrine of "establishing stable base areas", was only resulting in heavy casualties to their forces in Central and Northeastern Luzon. A new strategy of decentralization, codified in the 1974 document "Specific Characteristics of Our People's War," saw the establishment of regional commands, initially throughout Northeastern Luzon, and then in Southern Tagalog and Bicol.

==== Formation of the CPLA and Mount Data Peace Accord (1986) ====
In 1986, the Cordillera People's Liberation Army was formed when the New People's Army unit led by former priest Conrado Balweg broke away from the New People's Army, accusing the latter of incompetence in pursuing its goals. The splinter group's new stated goal was to fight for autonomy for the people of the Cordillera.

Shortly after Ferdinand Marcos was ousted by the People Power Revolution, the CPLA made a "sipat" or ceasefire with the newly established Provisional Government of the Philippines at the Mt. Data Hotel, in Bauko, Mountain province on September 13, 1986. The agreement between the two sides was called the 1986 Mount Data Peace Accord.

=== Corazon Aquino administration (1986–1992) ===
==== Release of Political Prisoners and "resurfacing" of activists ====
After Ferdinand Marcos was deposed during the 1986 EDSA Revolution, president Corazon Aquino ordered the release of political prisoners, including Jose Maria Sison and Bernabe Buscayno. Buscayno ceased activities related to the CPP-NPA while Sison eventually went into self-exile in the Netherlands, ostensibly to become chief political consultant to the NDF. Many activists who had joined the underground movement against Marcos chose to "resurface."

==== Mendiola massacre and cessation of peace talks ====
Preliminary peace talks were held between the new administration and the CPP–NPA–NDF, but these ended when the Mendiola massacre took place on January 22, 1987. This effectively ended dialogue between the CPP–NPA–NDF throughout the rest of Corazon Aquino's administration.

==== 1992 reaffirmist/rejectionist split ====
Between the 1970s and 1980s, thousands of volunteers, including youth and teenagers from both urban and rural areas, joined the organization. In 1992, NPA split into two factions: the reaffirmist faction led by Sison and the rejectionist faction which advocated the formation of larger military units and urban insurgencies. Through NPA's history, 13 smaller factions emerged from the group, the most notable being MLPP-RHB, APP, RPA-M, RPM/P–RPA–ABB and CPLA.

This split resulted in a weakening of the CPP-NPA, but it gradually grew again after the breakdown of peace talks in 1998, the unpopularity of the Estrada administration, and because of social pressures arising from the Asian Financial Crisis that year.

=== Ramos administration (1992–1998) ===
==== Repeal of the 1957 Anti-Subversion Act ====
A breakthrough in the peace process between the Government of the Philippines and the Communist Party of the Philippines took place on October 11, 1992, when Republic Act (RA) 1700 – the 1957 Anti-Subversion Act – was repealed by RA 7636 and the government declared a policy of amnesty and reconciliation. This was quickly followed by the Hague Joint Declaration of September 1, 1992, in which the Government of the Philippines and the Communist Party of the Philippines (through the National Democratic Front) agreed to work towards formal negotiations and "a just and lasting peace."

==== 1995 JASIG and 1998 CARHRIHL agreements ====
In 1995, negotiations led to the signing of the Joint Agreement on Safety and Immunity Guarantees (JASIG), under which negotiators on either side of the conflict were assured of "free and safe movement—without fear of search, surveillance, or arrest."

In 1998, another agreement, the Comprehensive Agreement to Respect Human Rights and International Humanitarian Law (CARHRIHL) was signed in an effort to protect civilians from the violence between the two parties.

==== Formation of the RPA-ABB (1996) ====
Due to the ideological split known as the Second Great Rectification Movement, the Negros Regional Party Committee of the New People's Army broke away from the Communist Party of the Philippines in 1996 and formed the Rebolusyonaryong Partido ng Manggagawà ng Pilipinas ("Revolutionary Workers' Party of the Philippines"). It organized its military arm two months after the split, calling it the Revolutionary Proletarian Army.

The Metro Manila-based Alex Boncayao Brigade, which also broke away from the New People's Army, allied itself with the RPA the year after, forming the Revolutionary Proletarian Army – Alex Boncayao Brigade (RPA-ABB).

==== Formation of the MLPP-RHB (1998) ====
In 1998, a group which operates mainly in Central Luzon broke away from the Communist Party of the Philippines, taking up a Marxist-Leninist ideology instead of the CPP's Marxism-Leninism-Maoism. This became the Marxist–Leninist Party of the Philippines which soon initiated conflict with the Philippine government through its armed wing, the Rebolusyonaryong Hukbong Bayan (RHB).

The conflict is still ongoing, although incidents covered in the media focus more on incidents arising from the rivalry between RHB and NPA.

=== Estrada administration (1998–2001) ===
The peace talks broke down soon after the 1998 agreement, however, and conflict between the two parties resumed at high levels after Joseph Estrada assumed the presidency later that year. In March 2001, a few months after Estrada was ousted by the "EDSA II" Revolution, National Security Advisor Roilo Golez noted that the number of "barangays influenced by" the CPP-NPA grew from 772 barangays 1,279 under the Estrada administration, which Golez added was "quite a big jump." In July 2001, officials of the Armed Forces of the Philippines noted that the NPA grew in strength "at an average of three to five percent yearly" since 1998.

=== Arroyo administration (2001–2010) ===
In 2001, the AFP launched a campaign of selective extrajudicial killings, in an attempt to suppress NPA activity. By targeting suspected rebel sympathizers, the campaign aimed to destroy the communist political infrastructure. The program was modeled after the Phoenix Program, a U.S. project implemented during the Vietnam War. According to Dr William Norman Holden, University of Calgary, security forces carried out a total of 1,335 extrajudicial killings between January 2001 – October 2012.

On August 9, 2002, NPA was designated a Foreign Terrorist Organization (FTO) by the United States Department of State. A parallel increase in counter-insurgency operations negatively affected the course of the rebellion. Netherlands-based Jose Maria Sison is currently the leader of CPP's eight member politburo and 26 member central committee—the party's highest ruling bodies. Despite the existence of the politburo, NPA's local units receive a high level of autonomy due to difficulties in communication between each of the fronts across the country.

Rebel recruits receive combat training from veteran fighters and ideological training by Mao Zedong in: the Three Rules of Discipline and Eight Points for Attention; the Comprehensive Agreement to Respect Human Rights and International Humanitarian Law. NPA also formed a limited tactical alliance with the Moro National Liberation Front and the Moro Islamic Liberation Front on the island of Mindanao, enabling the mutual transfer of troops through each other's territory. Between 1969 and 2008, more than 43,000 insurgency-related fatalities were recorded.

Plantations run by Japanese companies have been assaulted by the NPA.

=== Benigno Aquino III administration (2010–2016) ===
Several efforts to move forward with peace talks between the Government of the Philippines and the CPP, NDFP, and NPA were initiated throughout the administration of President Benigno Aquino III, with the government of the Kingdom of Norway providing support to the peace negotiations as a third-party facilitator.

=== Duterte administration (2016–2022) ===
In the State of the Nation Address by President Rodrigo Duterte which happened in July 2016, Duterte declared a unilateral ceasefire to the leftist rebels. Due to this declaration, the peace talks between the government and the NDF resumed in August 2016. The peace talks were carried out in Oslo, Norway.

In February 2017, the CPP–NPA–NDF declared that it would withdraw from the ceasefire, effective on February 10, 2017, due to the unfulfilled promise by the government that it would release all 392 political prisoners. After the communists killed three of their soldiers, the government also withdrew from the ceasefire. The peace talks were informally terminated and an all-out war was declared by the AFP.

In March 2017, the government announced a new truce and the resumption of peace talks, to take place in April. The fifth round was planned to take place in June.

However, on December 5, 2017, President Rodrigo Duterte declared the CPP and NPA as terrorist organizations after several attacks by the NPA against the government. The NDFP, the political wing of the communist rebellion was not included on the proclamation.

In order to centralize all government efforts for the reintegration of former communist rebels, President Duterte signed Administrative Order No. 10 on April 3, 2018, creating the Task Force Balik Loob which was placed in charge in centralizing the Enhanced Comprehensive Local Integration Program (E-CLIP) of the Department of the Interior and Local Government (DILG), and the Payapa at Masaganang Pamayanan (PAMANA) program of the Office of the Presidential Adviser on the Peace Process (OPAPP). As of December 30, 2019, the Task Force reported over 10,000 former CPP-NPA rebels and supporters who have returned to the fold of the law and availed of E-CLIP benefits, which include PHP65,000.00 cash assistance, livelihood training, housing benefits, among others.

On December 4, 2018, President Rodrigo Duterte signed Executive Order No. 70, which institutionalized a "whole-of-nation approach" in attaining an "inclusive and sustainable peace" to help end the decades-long communist insurgency, while also forming the National Task Force to End Local Communist Armed Conflict (NTF-ELCAC) which was directed to ensure the efficient and effective implementation of the approach. This order further intensified the Philippine government's campaign against the insurgency, with the Armed Forces of the Philippines alleging 11,605 rebels and supporters surrendering to the government, with 120 rebels being killed and 196 more arrested in military operations from January 1 to December 26, 2018.

=== Marcos Jr. Administration (2022–present) ===
Under the administration of President Ferdinand "Bongbong" Marcos Jr., peace talks have restarted with aims to end the conflict. On November 22, 2023, Marcos Jr. granted amnesty to many political prisoners and former rebels under the aim of "reconciliation," noting that this amnesty covered those who committed crimes "in pursuit of political beliefs." It would not grant amnesty to those guilty of war crimes, kidnapping for ransome, rape, or "other gross violations of human rights."

Between 2023 and early 2024, talks weakened, as NPA forces and the military continued skirmishing.

Despite the Philippine government claiming on March 2, 2025 that the NPA was defeated in Bukidnon, 100 NPA rebels clashed with the army in Bukidnon with an FA-50 fighter jet also going missing two days later. The two pilots in the jet were later found and confirmed dead.

In August and September 2025, the NPA attacked multiple army outposts in northern Philippines, killing 3 and injuring 3 more in an attack near Ligao City. While in Northern Negros on September 3–4, the NPA attacked military assets, and seized arms and ammunition. While on September 4, in South Central Negros three soldiers were wounded in an ambush. The armies response to the ambush resulted in 480 people being forced to evacuate the area.

== Support to the NPA from other countries ==
China provided support to the NPA from 1969 to 1976. After that period, the Chinese ceased all aid, resulting in a five-year period of reduced activity. Despite the setback, the rebellion rekindled with funds from revolutionary taxes, extortion and large scale foreign support campaigns. Besides extortion, the NPA has also conducted kidnappings of Filipino civilians and foreign businessmen as a source of funding. Both the CPP and NPA attempted to garner support from the Workers' Party of Korea, the Maoist factions of the Palestinian Liberation Organization, Japanese Red Army, Sandinista National Liberation Front, Communist Party of El Salvador, Communist Party of Peru, and the Algerian military. Financial aid, training, and other forms of support were received from a number of the above. NDF-controlled trading companies were allegedly set up in Hong Kong, Belgium, and Yugoslavia. At the same time the Communist Party of the Philippines formed a unit in the Netherlands and sent representatives to Germany, France, Italy, Greece, Ireland, United States, Sweden, and various parts of the Middle East. Despite the massive amount of aid previously received, foreign support eventually dried up following the fall of the Iron Curtain.

== Peace process ==
Based on the records of the Office of the Presidential Adviser on the Peace Process, the Government of the Philippines and the CPP–NPA–NDF had engaged in over 40 rounds of peace talks by November 2017.

=== Under Corazon Aquino ===
The first peace talks between the government and the CPP–NPA–NDF took place in the opening months of the Corazon Aquino administration, with formal discussions taking place from August to December 1986. The initial hope was that the new revolutionary government would be able to make peace with CPP–NPA–NDF, the new administration's release of many political prisoners was a reflection of that hope. However, there was considerable distrust between the CPP–NPA–NDF and many of the prominent figures of the Aquino government. Some of these elements were politicians who had been against Marcos, but had nonetheless come from the landholding elite class. Yet others, linked with the political right (such as the members of the Reform the Armed Forces who had inadvertently played a part of the civilian-led People Power revolution), actively pressured the Aquino administration not to have peace talks with the CPP–NPA–NDF. The CPP itself had effectively alienated itself from positions of influence in the new government because they had chosen to boycott the 1986 Philippine presidential election, and had no political presence at the People Power revolution that ensued – a decision the CPP later considered a "tactical error." This political tension was in the background on January 22, 1987, when a group of farmers marched to Malacañang in protest for the government's slow action on land reform. The farmers were fired upon, killing at least 12 and injuring 51 protesters. Peace talks ceased and did not resume until after Corazon Aquino's term as president.

=== Under Fidel V. Ramos ===
After Corazon Aquino, Fidel Ramos won the 1992 Presidential Election to become President of the Philippines. The Ramos administration sought to restart the peace process, putting amnesty and reconciliation policies in place. This resulted in the Hague Joint Declaration of 1992 which aimed towards the holding of formal negotiations so that "a just and lasting peace" could be attained. The parties signed the Joint Agreement on Safety and Immunity Guarantees (JASIG) on February 24, 1995, assuring the safety of NDF negotiators and consultants; they then sign the Comprehensive Agreement to Respect Human Rights and International Humanitarian Law (CARHRIHL) on March 16, 1998, with a promise to "confront, remedy and prevent" serious human rights violations" on either side. Formal peace talks continue until the end of Ramos' term in June 1998.

=== Under Joseph Estrada ===
Peace talks between the government and the CPP–NPA–NDF broke down during the term of Erap Estrada, and did not resume before he was deposed in 2001. Estrada suspended JASIG during this time.

=== Under Gloria Macapagal Arroyo ===
Peace talks resumed after Gloria Arroyo assumed the presidency, but are suspended after the assassination of Martial Law era intelligence agent turned RAM dissident Rodolfo Aguinaldo, who had since become Governor of Cagayan. Talks finally stall completely in 2002 in the wake of the George W. Bush administration in the U.S. labelling the CPP-NPA as a terrorist organization. Another round of peace talks and the Joint Monitoring Committee of the CARHRIHL is finally established, but the Arroyo administration becomes characterized by redtagging and violence. Peace talks break down in 2004 and do not resume until the end of Arroyo's term.

=== Under Benigno Simeon Aquino III ===
Peace talks resumed soon after Benigno Simeon Aquino III became president and the armed forces intensify their efforts at security sector reform. But talks soon break down when the NDF demands the end of Oplan Bayanihan and of the government's conditional cash transfer program (4Ps), which the government did not agree to do.

=== Under Rodrigo Duterte ===
Upon ascending to power in 2016, the Duterte administration started by proposing an accelerated peace plan for talks with the CPP–NPA–NDF. However, it reversed course in February 2017, canceling JASIG, and declared all-out-war on the CPP–NPA–NDF. Further efforts at peace talks were made but these also broke down as the Duterte administration became characterized by extrajudicial killings linked to its war on drugs.

== Activity in specific regions and provinces ==
=== Samar ===
Since the early stages of the rebellion, the island of Samar has been considered to be NPA's main stronghold. While Samar represents 2% and 4.47% of the Philippine population and territory respectively, 11% of all NPA related incidents have taken place on the island. Samar's terrain consists of densely forested mountainous areas, providing fertile ground for conducting guerrilla warfare.

An important factor in the spread of the rebellion was the issue of widespread landlessness. Land reforms provided only a limited solution for the millions of Philippine landless farmers. In the case of Samar, 40 landowning clans controlled approximately half of the island's agricultural land. Instances of landowner harassment and violence towards working class tenants led to escalating tensions between the two social groups.

Another factor into the Samar Island being a stronghold is historically the island has been among the most rebellious against the American Commonwealth rule, Spanish rule, and the Japanese occupation.

In 1976, NPA gained popular support among the inhabitants of Samar following vigilante actions against cattle rustling gangs. The following year, NPA transferred agents from Cebu and Manila where conditions were less favorable. The influx of troops enabled the NPA to form units fully engaged in guerrilla activities. In 1982, an unofficial communist government was formed, solidifying Samar as a communist stronghold. The 1980s downfall of the coconut industry greatly affected the livelihoods of many Samaranos, further fueling the rebellion. Between January 2011 and December 2012, a total of 153 insurgency-related incidents took place in Samar, resulting in 21 deaths and 55 injuries.

=== Mindanao ===
Prior to Ferdinand Marcos's September 23, 1972 announcement of martial law, the NPA did not have a presence in Mindanao, which was also only seeing the beginnings of the Moro separatist conflict in the form of clashes between the Ilaga and Blackshirt ethnic militias. Marcos's enforcement of martial law radicalized this situation until, as peace advocate Gus Miclat notes: "When Marcos fled in 1986, the NPA was virtually in all Mindanao provinces, enjoying even a tacit alliance with the MNLF."

=== "Insurgency free" areas ===
State of Stable Internal Peace and Security (SIPS) is a designation used by the Philippine government on local government units and regions to indicate that the said area is free from significant influence of communist rebels. Areas with SIPS status are also colloquially referred to as being insurgency free.

This list only applies to the communist insurgency, as other unrelated insurgencies may still be active in some of the provinces and regions listed below.

Regions

- Ilocos (Region I) – February 24, 2022
- Zamboanga Peninsula (Region IX) – June 14, 2022
- Davao (Region XI) – October 2022

Provinces and independent cities

- Cavite – December 4, 2018
- Romblon – February 21, 2019
- Marinduque – March 25, 2019
- Laguna – September 2019
- Davao del Norte – June 13, 2022
- Davao Occidental – June 16, 2022
- Davao de Oro – June 22, 2022
- Davao del Sur – July 1, 2022
- Quezon – June 12, 2023
- Tarlac – June 23, 2023
- Palawan – September 1, 2023
- Nueva Vizcaya – January 24, 2024
- Southern Leyte - May 5, 2026
- Davao City – March 24, 2022

== See also ==
- Timeline of the communist rebellion in the Philippines
- Maoism
- Political killings in the Philippines (2001–2010)
- Government of the Republic of the Philippines - National Democratic Front peace negotiations
