= Fidel Agcaoili =

Filipino activist and revolutionary (1944–2020)

- Born: August 8, 1944
- Died: July 23, 2020 (aged 75); Utrecht, Netherlands
- Other name: Ka Fidel
- Education: University of the Philippines Diliman
- Occupation: Chief negotiator for the National Democratic Front of the Philippines
- Organization(s): National Democratic Front of the Philippines; International League of People's Struggle; Samahan ng Ex-Detainees Laban sa Detensyon at Aresto; Kabataang Makabayan
- Political party: Communist Party of the Philippines (from 1968)
- Other political affiliations: Partido Komunista ng Pilipinas-1930 (until 1968)
- Spouse: Rosario Agcaoili

Fidel V. Agcaoili (August 8, 1944 – July 23, 2020), also known as Ka Fidel, was a Filipino activist and revolutionary. He was a member of the Communist Party of the Philippines' Central Committee, along with Jose Maria Sison and Luis Jalandoni during the Marcos dictatorship. In 1974, he was arrested and became the longest detained political prisoner under Marcos, being imprisoned for 11 years. On his release, Agcaoili founded the Samahan ng mga Ex-Detainee Laban sa Detensyon at Aresto (SELDA), a prisoners' rights organization.

From 1989 until his death, Agcaoili was involved in peace negotiations between the Government of the Republic of the Philippines and the National Democratic Front of the Philippines. Most notably, he was instrumental in signing the Comprehensive Agreement on the Respect for Human Rights and International Humanitarian Law (CARHRIHL) in 1998. Agcaoili continued to serve in the peace panel, becoming co-chair of the GRP-NDFP Joint Monitoring Committee in 2004, and eventually succeeding Jalandoni as chief negotiator in 2017.

== Early life and activism ==
Agcaoili was born to an "upper class family" and "could have easily attained an endless series of high positions in the ruling system. His father had an insurance company and was an established lawyer, and was a classmate and friend of Ferdinand Marcos in the UP College of Law. His family lived in Philamlife Homes.

Agcaoili first became a student at the University of the Philippines Diliman in the early 1960s, taking up Political Science. As a freshman, he was first exposed to activism when he became a member of the Student Cultural Association of the University of the Philippines (SCAUP). As a member of SCAUP, he encouraged his friends and neighbors in Philamlife Homes to join in mass actions organized by SCAUP. He also joined a fraternity in UP, encouraging his fraternity brods to be politically active.

Norberto Basilio, who would eventually become the Philippine ambassador to Greece and Bangladesh introduced Agcaoili to Jose Maria Sison and Julie de Lima. Agcaoili joined a Marxist study organized by Sison, which took place in the private residence of ambassador Emilio Bejasa. His son, Emilio Jr. was also a member of SCAUP, and his father had a collection of Marxist works. Basilio, Bejasa Jr., and Agcaoili would continue to maintain close contact during the Martial Law years as members of the Communist Party of the Philippines.

In 1963, his father sent him to study in California, fearing that he was "straying too far into revolutionary activism." While in the United States, he became a part of the protests against the Vietnam War. He returned a year later, in time to participate in the founding of Kabataang Makabayan in 1964. It was also during this time when he met, eloped, and married his wife, Rosario.

At some point, Agcaoili became a high-ranking officer in his father's insurance company. He also became a member of the Partido Komunista ng Pilipinas-1930 during this time, which was undergoing a split between the old Lava faction and the younger faction led by Sison. He organized studies, produced publications, and entered negotiations with other local and foreign parties, and eventually contributed to the reorganization brought about by the First Great Rectification Movement.

== Marcos dictatorship and Martial Law ==
In 1970, Agcaoili became part of the Central Committee of the CPP. He also became the chair of the CPP's Finance Committee. Agcaoili was involved in "discreet" action as part of the CPP. Although he did not take an active part, he was present in the Battle of Mediola on January 30, 1970. Agcaoili and Satur Ocampo were also involved in aiding Victor Corpus' defection to the New People's Army, assisting in the 1970 raid of the Philippine Military Academy raid in Baguio.

Agcaoili, Rosario, and their two children went underground before the imposition of Martial Law in September 1972. State forces interrogated his family in a bid to know their whereabouts.

While underground, Agcaoili became instrumental in founding the National Democratic Front of the Philippines on April 23, 1973. He was also reportedly involved in the purchase of the M/V Karagatan, which was used by the New People's Army in an attempt to land arms in Palanan, Isabela, and the M/V Doña Andrea II in a similar attempt in 1974.

=== Arrest and detention ===
Agcaoili and his family were eventually arrested on May 12, 1974, in Balicon Subdivision, Calasiao, Pangasinan. A military tribunal charged with rebellion related to the M/V Karagatan incident. Agcaoili was incarcerated in various detention centers while contesting the charges, such as Camp Crame, Bilibid, and lastly in Camp Bagong Diwa, Taguig.

Agcaoili, like other political prisoners, was subject to torture, solitary confinement, and other methods of abuse. State agents gave him morphine injections to induce addiction, the idea being that the withdrawal would be so severe as to force him to give up information. The military considered him to be one of the "hard-cores" alongside other prominent figures in the revolutionary movement such as Sison and Bernabe Buscayno.

While in prison, Agcaoili continued to push for better living conditions, visiting hours, and so on. In 1976, Agcaoili and more than 140 other political prisoners staged a 14-day hunger strike to demand the release of two nursing mothers and their babies. They were subject to brutal retaliation from soldiers, and the strike's leaders, including Agcaoili, were forcibly taken by soldiers from their cells. A "literal tug-of-war" occurred between soldiers and the other detainees over Agcaoili, but he eventually willingly went with the soldiers to prevent injuries on the detainees.

During the visit of Pope John Paul II to the Philippines in 1981, Agcaoili and other political prisoners were transferred to Bilibid prison in Muntinlupa, where they were threatened by armed gangs inside the prison. Agcaoili reportedly called all the gang leaders in a meeting and said, "We know you are all armed. But we political prisoners, we have an army outside prison, the New People's Army. If you harm any of us, you will be held accountable by the NPA." The threats ended and the gangs eventually joined the political prisoners in protest actions.

The lifting of Martial Law in 1981 resulted in the release of multiple political prisoners. Agcaoili, however, was not scheduled for release due to his status. He first applied for bail in 1982, but no action was taken by the court. He filed a petition for mandamus on April 14, 1984, to compel the government to release him on bail. He was eventually released on October 24, 1984, more than ten years after his initial arrest.

== Post-detention ==
On his release, Agcaoili returned to activism. He formed the Samahan ng mga Ex-Detainee Laban sa Detensyon at Aresto (SELDA), a prisoners' rights group. He also helped organize Families of Victims of Involuntary Disappearance (FIND) in 1985, becoming its Executive Director.

The overthrow of the Marcos dictatorship gave renewed energy to both the leftist progressive movement and the revolutionary movement. Agcaoili, Sison, and others, began laying the groundwork for peace negotiations on the request of the new Corazon Aquino administration, through Executive Secretary Joker Arroyo, but peace negotiations stalled and eventually broke down.

Agcaoili was also involved in the Preparatory Committee which established the Partido ng Bayan (PnB, precursor to Bagong Alyansang Makabayan) on August 30, 1986. Agcaoili took over as Chairman when labor leader Rolando Olalia and his driver Leonor Alay-ay were kidnapped and murdered by elements of the Armed Forces of the Philippines as part of the "God Save the Queen" plot, in time for the 1987 senatorial elections.

In 1988, Agcaoili was targeted for arrest and decides to go on voluntary exile in Europe, taking a job with the Spanish non-government organization Instituto de Estudios Políticos para América Latina y Africa (IEPALA).

Alongside other former political prisoners under Marcos, SELDA filed a landmark class-action lawsuit against the Marcos estate for reparations on account of the grave human rights abuses they suffered during the time of Martial Law. Agcaoili and Ocampo collated the names and experiences of some 10,000 victims of human rights abuses during the Marcos dictatorship and brought the case to court in Hawaii.

Agcaoili was also a representative of the International Network of Philippine Studies, and became instrumental in organizing the International League of People's Struggle with Sison. Agcaoili also continued his key role in representing the NDFP in negotiations with other parties, organizations, and movements, as well as organizing migrant Filipino workers.

== Peace talks ==
Agcaoili joined exploratory talks between the GRP and the NDFP in 1989 when President Aquino sent Jose Yap to the Netherlands to negotiate. Talks continued on and off at the tail-end of the Aquino administration and into the Fidel V. Ramos administration. On September 1, 1992, when both sides adopted the Hague Joint Declaration as the framework of the GRP-NDFP peace negotiations, Agcaoili assumed the role of Vice Chairperson of the NDFP Negotiating Panel.

Agcaoili also headed the NDFP Reciprocal Working Committee for Human Rights and International Humanitarian Law, which drafted the Comprehensive Agreement on the Respect for Human Rights and International Humanitarian Law, adding specific provisions for the respect of rights for political prisoners. CARHRIHL was formally signed on March 16, 1998

In 2004, Agcaoili served as the co-chair of the GRP-NDFP Joint Monitoring Committee which looked into CARHRIHL violations. He continued in this position until his death. In 2016, he replaced Luis Jalandoni as chairperson of the NDFP Negotiating Panel, in time for the resumption of peace talks under Rodrigo Duterte. Agcaoili engaged in a series of talks with Duterte which paved the way for the resumption of peace talks in August 2016.

== Death ==
On July 23, 2020, the National Democratic Front of the Philippines announced that Agcaoili died, 12:45 pm, in Utrecht, Netherlands. The cause of death was a pulmonary arterial rupture which caused massive bleeding. Agcaoili was cremated on July 30 in Crematorium Daelwijck in Utrecht, and was sent to the Philippines for burial. A tribute was also streamed live over the internet on August 8, 2020, on what was to be Agcaoili's 76th birthday.

Agcaoili was survived by his wife Rosario, five children, and multiple grandchildren.

== Legacy ==
The Communist Party of the Philippines called Agcaoili "one of the most beloved and respected leaders of the Party, the NDFP, and the Filipino people." It also declared August 8 as a "National Day of Remembrance and Tribute" to Agcaoili. Jorge "Ka Oris" Madlos, spokesperson for the New People's Army, stated that Agcaoili's "life, his militance, commitment and determination to advance the revolutionary struggle for national freedom and social liberation will forever serve as inspiration for all Red fighters of the NPA and for the Filipino people."

SELDA released a joint statement alongside other human rights organizations, praising Agcaoili as a "staunch champion and defender of human rights." They described him as"blunt, yet funny; serious and gentle, and always imparting lessons from his life in the revolutionary struggle."

Contemporaries remembered Agcaoili as taking on the smallest details, such as making travel arrangements and picking up consultants at the airports, despite his high-ranking position. His counterparts in the GRP Negotiating Panel regarded him as "kind, flexible on the negotiating panel, yet strict and firm on principles." Former Quezon City mayor Herbert Bautista, who was also a part of the GRP Panel, called Agcaoili "funny, but firm and serious on the negotiating table." Idun Tvedt, the Royal Norwegian Special Envoy to the Philippine Peace Process, said Agcaoili was "a professional and dedicated negotiator in the search for a peace solution to the armed conflict in the Philippines." Her predecessor, Elisabeth Slattum, called him a negotiator "with great dedication and heart for the cause."

The Communist Party of Canada (Marxist-Leninist) published a short statement in its publication, calling Agcaoili's death a "great loss to the CPP, the NDFP and the entire Filipino people." The Workers World Party also sent its "deepest condolences and firm solidarity", saying his " lifelong dedication to organizing working and oppressed people must be held high as an example and inspiration for revolutionaries around the world and in particular the youth."

Journalists remembered him as "always eager to clarify issues." Danny Buenafe called him the "toughest" between him, Sison, and Jalandoni.

After his death, Julieta de Lima-Sison was appointed interim chairperson of the NDFP Negotiating Panel, being the "most senior and most available" member of the peace panel.
