= Ericson Acosta =

Ericson Acosta (May 27, 1972 – November 30, 2022) was a revolutionary, serving as a former National Democratic Front of the Philippines (NDFP) consultant for the peace negotiations. He was also a poet, journalist, musician, cultural activist, and environmentalist.

== Activism ==
Acosta was a cultural activist from the University of the Philippines Diliman (UP Diliman) who lived as a poet, journalist, theatrist, and musician. He was a member of university chapters of National Democratic Mass Organizations League of Filipino Students and Alay Sining, where he composed several songs. He was a literary editor of the Philippine Collegian. His college years coincided with the Second Great Rectification Movement, which challenged him to deepen the call to learn from the masses while his activism encouraged him against his heavy drinking habit. He was also a former chairperson of UP Diliman political alliance STAND UP and Concerned Artists of the Philippines. He also wrote for Pinoy Weekly.

As a poet, he was known to have published poetry and songs. His collection of socio-political poetry, Mula Tarima Hanggang at iba pang mga Tula at Awit (From Tarima (Note: "Tarima" is a slang term among Philippine prisons meaning small jail beds used for sleeping.) Until and other Poetry and Songs) was awarded "Best Book of Poetry in Filipino" by the 35th Philippine National Book Awards and Manila Critics Circle. He was known for his poem "And So Your Poetry Must" and his recording of "Walang Kalabaw sa Cubao". He was a finalist for the Imprisoned Artist Prize of the 2011 Freedom to Create Prize. Acosta was also a highlighted writer during the 2012 Day of the Imprisoned Writer.

Heavily involved in theater, Acosta directed and wrote socio-political plays such as monumento.

Acosta also involved himself in issues concerning the environment and peasants, being part of the Kilusang Magbubukid ng Pilipinas (KMP).

=== Detention ===
While carrying field research in San Jorge, Samar on February 13, 2011, he was captured and detained by the Armed Forces of the Philippines (AFP). He was red-tagged as a member of the New People's Army and charged with illegal possession of explosives. The AFP claimed that he was a 'top personality of the Communist Party'. Bringing a laptop and taking notes of the situation of farmers, Acosta's research involved the continued militarization and economic hardships in the island even after the time of AFP Gen. Jovito Palparan. His line of work and fate was said to be akin to Dr. Leonard Co.

Despite being detained, Acosta continued to pursue his art and, reminiscent of Vietnamese hero Ho Chi Minh's Prison Diaries, released The Prison Sessions, a raw recording of progressive songs.

Acosta received support for his release, including statements and campaigns from PEN International.

He was released after almost two years; the Department of Justice dismissed the case in January 2013, citing baseless claims.

=== NDFP peace consultant ===
From 2016 until the time of his death, Acosta was a peace consultant of the NDFP for the peace talks between the Government of the Republic of the Philippines and the NDFP, who have been engaging in decades-long belligerency. He was instrumental in contributions in the draft of the Comprehensive Agreement on Social and Economic Reforms (CASER) by participating in formal peace talks and discussions of reciprocal working committees between the two forces.

As an NDFP consultant, he had to work underground in concern for his safety while being with the poorest farmers and farm workers in Negros, and learning about their conditions and aspirations while serving them using his cultural skills. The work of the likes of Acosta underscored the said failure of agrarian reform programs of the Philippines suffering from the colonial hacienda system and the government's Comprehensive Agrarian Reform Program (CARP).

Negros, together with Bicol and Samar, have been seen as the most militarized regions in the Philippines, especially under president Rodrigo Duterte's Memorandum Order 32 (MO 32), which designated these areas under a 'state of lawlessness' since 2018 where battalions of government troops have been destroyed, resulting in scores of human rights violations.

== Death ==
Acosta was killed during a military operation by the AFP on November 30, 2022, in Kabankalan City, Negros Occidental. The AFP claimed that Acosta and his companion, Joseph Jimenez from the KMP, were killed in an encounter between the AFP and the NPA. However, the NDFP-Negros claimed that the two were captured alive and summarily executed. There have been reports that forces of the AFP forcibly took Acosta and Jimenez from the house where they were staying before being killed about 200 meters away. Human rights group Karapatan said that the bodies bore "indications that they were stabbed and hacked". The owner of the house and the family were reportedly missing after Acosta and Jimenez were killed.

=== Reactions ===
PEN International called for an urgent enquiry into the fate of Acosta.

The Commission on Human Rights, after a few days, started a probe and underscored the need to respect International humanitarian law (IHL). Acosta's death has been decried as a continuous tactic by the AFP to project executions as military encounters or firefights between government troops and the rebels. In relation, the KMP claimed that Acosta must be shielded from military abuses that being a peace consultant, he was under the Joint Agreement on Safety and Immunity Guarantees (JASIG) protection. They added that his killing under the current Bongbong Marcos administration is a testament to the continuation of brutal counter-insurgency policies for the MO 32 signed under Duterte was being continued.

Amnesty International has also called for the investigation of the killings of activists pertaining not only to the fate of Acosta but also other human rights abuses in the region. They cited the killing of Zara Alvarez and human rights lawyer Benjamin Ramos as related incidents of human rights violations.

The AFP, under 303rd Infantry Brigade commander B/Gen. Inocencio Pasaporte, claimed that Acosta was killed under a legitimate armed encounter and they were not happy about the CHR investigation. There have been efforts of the AFP and the National Task Force to End Local Communist Armed Conflict (NTF-ELCAC) to discredit tributes praising Acosta.

=== Investigation ===
From the investigations by forensic pathologist Dr. Raquel Fortun, groups expressed that he may have been shot even after death, among other violations of IHL.

== Personal life ==
Acosta was the husband to Kerima Tariman, fellow cultural artist and peasant activist, who was killed in an encounter in Silay City on August 20, 2021. They have a son named Eman.
