= Maria Lorena Barros =

Filipino activist

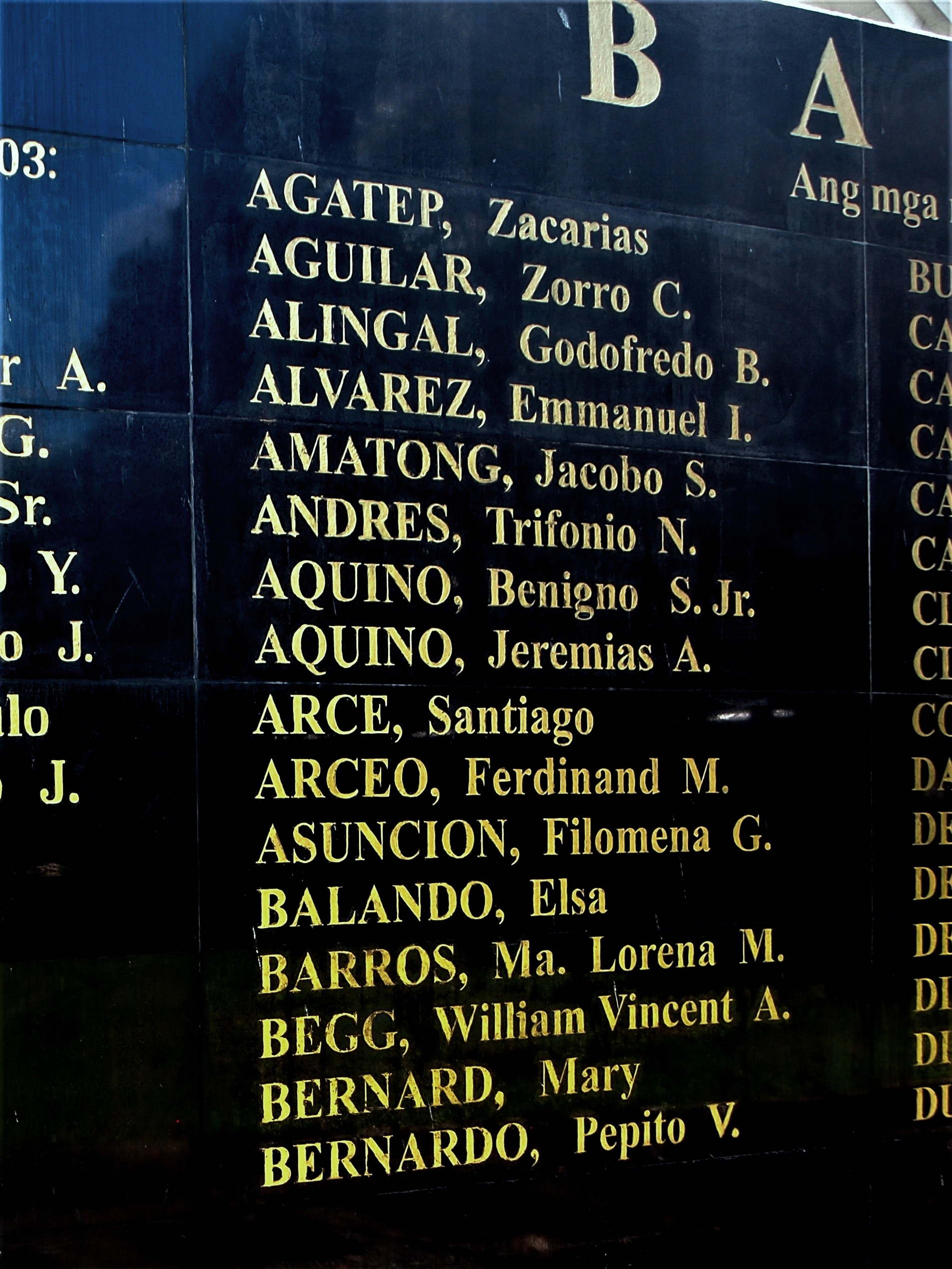
- Detail of the Wall of Remembrance at the Bantayog ng mga Bayani, showing names from the first batch of Bantayog Honorees, including that of Lorena Barros.
- Born: Maria Lorena Morelos Barros; March 18, 1948; Baguio, Mountain Province, Philippines
- Died: March 24, 1976 (aged 28); Mauban, Quezon, Philippines
- Cause of death: Gunshot wounds
- Resting place: La Loma Cemetery
- Other names: Laurie, Wawi
- Education: University of the Philippines Diliman (BA)
- Known for: being an activist during the Martial Law in the Philippines and for founding MAKIBAKA, a militant women's organization
- Children: 1

Maria Lorena Morelos Barros (March 18, 1948 – March 24, 1976) was a Filipino activist. She founded the Malayang Kilusan ng Bagong Kababaihan (Free Movement of New Women) or MAKIBAKA, a militant women's organization shortly before the Martial Law regime of Ferdinand Marcos. When Martial Law was declared, she went underground, was later captured and was a top political prisoner. She escaped to the countryside as a guerrilla fighter and was killed during a military ambush at 28 years old.

== Birth, Childhood and Education ==
Maria Lorena Morelos Barros was born on March 18, 1948. Her father was Romeo Barros. Her mother Alicia Morelos was secretary of the family corporation and an assistant to the owner of a movie house. Lorena grew up with her mother, maternal grandfather and aunts in a modest home. Her family valued education and proper manners.

Lorena Barros studied until Grade II at the Instituto de Mujeres (Academy for Women) and finished grade school at St. Joseph's College. She was described as an inquisitive, conscientious and affectionate child. She was among the top students in her school. At a young age, Laurie, as she was affectionately called, was an early reader. The love for literature and learning was cultivated by her mother early on. Since Lorena was an only child, her mother would buy her books so that she would not be lonely.

Lorena enrolled in the Far Eastern University (FEU) Girls High School, this time as a scholar. She was active in many extra-curricular activities: director of the school play, member of the Gymnastics Team, President of the Junior Red Cross and the Student Catholic Action-FEU Chapter. She was managing editor of the school newspaper, the Advocate and had her column “Margin Notes”. Among her pseudonyms were Malo, Lio Marea and Malachi. She was awarded the gold medal for Creative Writing and graduated from high school as Honorable Mention.

== College ==
On July 21, 1965, Lorena enrolled at the University of the Philippines (UP) Diliman, initially taking a Bachelor of Science in biochemistry. Her mother insisted on Lorena taking up this course since she felt that taking a degree in the arts would be too easy for her, so she had to “conquer her waterloo”, which was Math. Alicia wanted to have a doctor or a chemist in the family. However, Lorena wanted to become a writer.

Bored, Lorena rebutted her mother by telling her that she has become insomniac because she had slept through all of her Math and Science subjects. Lorena wanted to take up Anthropology since she believed that “You can’t really take up the present without going to the past.” Furthermore, in an interview with Lorna Kalaw-Tirol, she said, “My concept of commitment then was in terms of research. I wanted to use my training in Anthropology to do some real research on Philippine society”. Lorena had serious disagreements with her mother and would rebel by running away from home. Eventually, her mother relented and Lorena shifted to BA Anthropology after three semesters during the Academic Year 1967–1968. She got high grades and made it to the honor roll, became a College Scholar during that semester and a University Scholar after one year.

In addition, Lorena would join different organizations, such as the UP Anthropology Society and the UP Writer's Club, becoming its secretary in November 1969. Very sociable in nature, her mother used to call her a “social butterfly”. She would go out with friends to watch movies and listen to music, sometimes staying outside concerts because they could not afford to buy tickets. Lorena would have disagreements with her mother because she imposed a curfew, and thus Lorena called herself Cinderella, always home by midnight.

Lorena's mother was also overprotective and even inspected the Basement, a canteen located at the basement of the Arts and Science building in the University of the Philippines, where Lorena and the other students would hang out.

In spite of these disagreements, Lorena helped her family who was in “genteel poverty” by working for Diliman Review, the academic journal of the University of the Philippines Diliman. Even if she received a salary of 200 pesos a month, Lorena would save her money by spending only 25 cents a day—5 cents by eating banana-q (with 3 pieces of bananas on a stick) for lunch, walking part-way from home to school, and catching a bus that would take her to UP for 10 cents. However, she retained her poise and gracefulness of manner, and thus, Lorena had many suitors.

As a member—and later officer—of the UP Writers’ Club, Lorena was then writing “exquisite poetry” in English. Her works were published in magazines and in the Philippine Collegian, the official student publication of the University of the Philippines. Among her poems were “Documentary of a War”, “Poem to Han-shan”, “A Park is Born”, “There is a new scavenger”, “The Swingles Came to Town”, “You are Lord” and “Strike”.

During this time, Lorena was reading the works of French existentialists like Jean Paul Sartre and Simone de Beauvoir, the Eurasian Han Suyin, the anti-imperialist Bertrand Russell; Philippine nationalists such as Claro M. Recto, Lorenzo Tanada, Renato Constantino and Teodoro Agoncillo; and the revolutionary Karl Marx and Mao Zedong. This, and the political events of the time, would lead to her political awakening.

== Growing Political Involvement and the Founding of MAKIBAKA ==
At around this time, the tense political events in the Philippines would eventually lead to Martial Law, which also saw the rise of the student movement and the national democratic movement. Alicia Morelos was afraid that her daughter's growing politicization and involvement in the student movement in the University of the Philippines (which was a hotbed for activism) would turn her into a communist. True enough, Lorena joined the SDK or the Samahan ng Demokratikong Kabataan (Association of Democratic Youth), an activist, anti-imperialist and national democratic youth organization.

During the First Quarter Storm in 1970, which was characterized by anti-Marcos protests led by student demonstrations that were violently dispersed by the police, Lorena would be in the forefront of the struggle. At this time, she wrote mostly in Filipino, in order to be understood by the masses.

When she graduated from the University of the Philippines with cum laude honors on April 11, 1970, she joined the protest action held by the graduating students—who were dressed in togas but carrying placards and wearing red armbands—against the colonial and bourgeois character of Philippine education. As an honor student, she protested against the exorbitant fees charged by the international honor society of Phi Beta Kappa and wrote that “True honor comes from the people”. When the police attempted to seize the University of the Philippines campus during the Diliman Commune, Lorena was among the students who barricaded the campus and threw stones at the gun-toting policemen.

In April 1970, MAKIBAKA or the Malayang Samahan ng Bagong Kababaihan (Free Movement of New Women) was established, with Lorena as the founding chair. Prior to MAKIBAKA, both the Kabataang Makabayan or KM (Nationalist Youth—another anti-imperialist and national democratic youth organization) and the SDK had a women's bureau, namely the SDK-WOC (Women's Organization Committee) and the KM Women's desk. Initially, the need for establishing a women's organization separate from the SDK and the KM was questioned, saying that such an organization would divide the ranks. However, Lorena clarified the ideological line, saying that a woman's organization would specifically address the women's issues in a semi-feudal, semi-colonial and patriarchal Philippine society. Through MAKIBAKA, the women's struggle had become more ideological than their precursors, in that they fought not only Marcos, but sought to redress the structural inequality in Philippine society—that of imperialism, feudalism and bureaucrat capitalism. The foundation of MAKIBAKA was important because it articulated the women's question within the broader framework of national and class oppression. In addition, it helped organize women within the ranks of the revolutionary forces.

Their first major activity was the protest of the Binibining Pilipinas or the Miss Philippines Beauty Pageant held at the Araneta Coliseum on April 18, 1970. Among their other activities were the picket of the UP Corps of Sponsor to protest the militarization of the campus, the establishment of the National Democratic Nursery and the Mothers’ Corps and the support for the worker's strike at the US Tobacco Corporation. They also held teach-ins and discussion groups wherein they discussed national and women's issues, visited political prisoners, paid homage to revolutionary martyrs, and rallied against the high prices. During this time, Lorena was writing essays and short articles on the women's situation and the emancipation of women.

== Incarceration during Martial Law and Escape ==
In an underground ceremony in 1970, Lorena married Felix Rivera, a member of the KM and a top graduate of the Arellano High School, where he was editor-in-chief of the school paper. He was also a former Political Science Student at the University of the Philippines. However, Felix was killed in 1971 in San Agustin, Isabela as a guerrilla fighter of the New People's Army (NPA), the armed wing of the Communist Party of the Philippines. Even if saddened by the death of her husband, she tried to control her feelings and channeled it towards her poetry, particularly in the poem “Sampaguita”.

Later that year, she joined the NPA immersion program in Isabela, and there she met Ramon Sanchez, her former professor who then became the NPA commander in that area. The two were married.

Lorena returned to the city and went underground because the activists foresaw that the tense political developments would lead to Martial Law. The Writ of Habeas Corpus was suspended in August 1971, which meant that arrest without a warrant was legal, and Lorena's name was among those included in the list of activists to be detained.

On September 21, 1972, Martial Law was declared, which curtailed freedom of speech, banned group discussions, public assemblies and cultural activities, sequestered the businesses of Marcos’ rivals, raided the homes, and illegally detained people. During this time, Lorena was seven months pregnant and was underground, meaning that she has to hide in the city and secretly move from one house to another. On November 24, 1972, her son Ramon Emiliano Sanchez was born. Because she was constantly fleeing the police, it was difficult to move around with the baby: one rainy night, when her safe house was raided, Lorena was running with her baby in her arms and jumped from a seven-foot-fence. Fortunately, the neighbor took pity on them and hid them in their homes. She left her son with her aunt Lilian Morelos and in August 1973, she joined her husband when she was sent to Bicol as a political instructor.

In October 1973, Lorena, then pregnant, was captured by the military in Sorsogon, was interrogated and tortured. Because of this, she suffered a miscarriage. A top political prisoner, Lorena was detained in Canlubang and later in Ipil Rehabilitation Center in Fort Bonifacio. During this time, Lorena also learned that Ramon surrendered and led the military to the guerrilla zone. Although saddened by Ramon's betrayal, Lorena was determined and declared, “I will pick up the gun you have put down”.

Compared to the other prisons, the Ipil Rehabilitation Center was relatively comfortable and her family was able to visit her often. Nonetheless, the prisoners planned to escape by digging their way out of the building. On November 1, 1975, Lorena was able to escape.

Lorena then resumed her revolutionary activities in the mountains of Quezon province. There, she met Eliseo Miranda and they were supposed to be married; however, he was killed en route to meet Lorena's family.

== Death ==
At dawn on March 24, 1976, the military tracked down the hut where Lorena was staying. On guard, Lorena fired before her gun jammed. Wounded in the head and the body, Lorena ran away but the military was able to follow her. Some accounts say that she died in a military stretcher on the way to the camp, while other accounts said that a soldier fired her on the nape. Her corpse was subject to much indignity, with the soldiers insensitively commenting on her beautiful legs and a movie crew taking pictures beside her corpse. A huge sum was needed for her family to claim her body; friends from MAKIBAKA helped in raising funds. Her wake was in a funeral in Sta. Cruz, and a memorial was done in the University of the Philippines Chapel. She was buried in La Loma Cemetery.

== Legacy ==
Lorena is seen as a symbol of the women's movement—with her strength and courage inspiring women. Countless poems, songs and plays are written in her honor. Lilia Quindoza Santiago in her book In the Name of the Mother writes, “Barros is now a symbol of poet, warrior, lover, woman. Many young women writers derive inspiration from her writings, principles and struggle; her name is often mentioned in meetings of women members of the movement.”

Two of the plays that was staged in her honor is the monologue “Lorena” written by Lualhati Bautista and performed by Dessa Quesada in the 1980s; and the musical "Lorena" by Joi Barrios, both of which were based on Lorena's life and the letters written to her mother and fellow activists. Another was the play “Ang mga Lorena”, which was staged by the youth cultural group Sinagbayan at the University of the Philippines Diliman in December 2008. In this play, her story is intertwined to that of UP student activists Karen Empeno and Sherlyn Cadapan, who were abducted by military personnel in June 2006 and still remain missing until today.

Among the poems dedicated to her are E. San Juan's “Ang Tagumpay Ni Maria Lorena Barros” (“The Victory of Lorena Barros”) (1983) and “Maria Lorena Barros, Pumuputol Sa Alambre’t Rehas” (“Maria Lorena Barros, who cuts the wires and the prison bars”) ( written in 2009) and Bienvenido Lumbera's "Ang mga Lorena"(“The Lorenas”).

The song “Babae” (“Woman”) on YouTube composed by the activist singers Inang Laya mentions her name as one of the women heroes (along with Gabriela Silang, Teresa Magbanua, Tandang Sora, Liza Ballando and Liliosa Hilao) who have fought in the revolution.

In the University of the Philippines, the Lorena Barros Hall in Vinzons’ Hall—the student activity center in the university—was named in her honor. She is also among the 298 revolutionary heroes and martyrs honored on the Bantayog ng mga Bayani Wall of Remembrance, which lists the names of the activists who were killed, disappeared or who fought during the Marcos dictatorship.

Because of MAKIBAKA, of which Lorena Barros was the founding chair, several women's groups were formed that would protest against the Martial Law and would seek to address the structural inequalities of the Philippines and mobilize women, particularly from the grassroots. MAKIBAKA eventually evolved into GABRIELA (General Assembly Binding Women for Reforms, Integrity, Equality, Leadership, and Action), a broad alliance of women's organizations, which was founded in April 1984 a year after the assassination of Benigno “Ninoy” Aquino Jr. GABRIELA is an anti-imperialist grassroots-based women's organization that aims to liberate women through fighting for national sovereignty, democratic governance, land reform and basic services for the people; end militarization and discrimination among men and women; and build solidarity among international women's groups to fight “sexism, imperialism and militarism”.

== Poems of Lorena Barros ==
- “Documentary of a War” Philippine Collegian. 3 Apr. 1968. Rpt. In Sarilaya: Women in Arts and Media. Eds. Sr. Mary John Mananzan, Ma. Asuncion Azcuna and Fe Mangahas. Manila: Institute of Women's Studies, 1989. 107–110.
- “There is a new scavenger.” Philippine Collegian. 29 Aug. 1968.
- “The Swingles Came to Town.” Philippine Collegian. 16 Jan. 1969.
- “Awit Panalubong sa Turista ng mga Taga-Tanauan.” Philippine Collegian. 27 Feb. 1969.
- “Dalwampu’t Isa.” Philippine Collegian. 3 Sept. 1969.
- “A Park is Born.” Collegian Folio. 1st Semester 1968–1969. Rpt. in In the Name of the Mother. Ed. Lilia Quindoza Santiago. Quezon City: UP Press, 2002. 149.
- “Sampaguita.” Ulos. 1973. Rpt. in Kamao: Tula ng Protesta 1970–1986. Eds. Alfrredo Salanga, et al. Manila: CCP, 1987. 94–95.
- “Ipil is harder to bear.” Kamao: Tula ng Protesta 1970–1986. Eds. Alfrredo Salanga, et al. Manila: CCP: 1987. 94–95. Rpt. in In the Name of the Mother. Ed. Lilia Quindoza Santiago. Quezon City: UP Press, 2002. 335.
- “Yesterday I had a talk.” Kamao: Tula ng Protesta 1970–1986. Eds. Alfrredo Salanga, et al. Manila: CCP 1987. 96. Rpt. in In the Name of the Mother. Ed. Lilia Quindoza Santiago. Quezon City: UP Press, 2002.
- “Ina” From a letter dated to Alicia Morelos 23 July 1973. Six Young Filipino Martyrs. Ed. Asuncion David Maramba. Pasig: Anvil, 1997.
