= Government of the Republic of the Philippines–National Democratic Front of the Philippines peace negotiations =

Negotiations between the Government of the Republic of the Philippines (GRP) and the National Democratic Front of the Philippines (NDFP) involved in the CPP-NPA rebellion has been a peace process since the late 80s, first formalized during the Hague Joint Declaration between the two parties on September 1, 1992.

== Background ==
The ongoing Communist Party of the Philippines–New People's Army–National Democratic Front (CPP-NPA-NDF) rebellion dates back to the reestablishment of the CPP by Jose Maria Sison on December 26, 1968 and the establishment of its armed wing, NPA, on March 29, 1969. The movement challenged the dictatorship of then-president Ferdinand Marcos Sr. The revolutionaries have aimed to follow the strategy of protracted people's war and has continued this endeavor even after the fall of the dictatorship, saying that the Philippine society must be revolutionized in order to end the current Philippine society which is, according to their belief, a semi-colonial and semi-feudal country plagued by the root of social ills of US imperialism, feudalism, and bureaucrat-capitalism.

Following the strategy, the revolutionaries have maintained that they are a belligerent force in the Philippines, establishing local "goberyong bayan" or people's governments that through 'victories in people's war', as well as local support, have gained recognition even in the international scene of the People's Democratic Government. This background of asserting as a belligerent force, and not simply as insurgents, has been cited in signed peace agreements as 'equal parties' to the armed conflict, with the NDFP as a co-belligerent in the civil war, denoting that two warring governments exist in the Philippines. The state of belligerency has been continuously denied by the GRP and officials of the Armed Forces of the Philippines (AFP).

== Principles ==
In different periods, the two groups have agreed that in order to resolve the roots of armed struggle in the Philippines, the economic demands of Filipinos, especially the poorest must be met.

== Agreements ==
The 1992 Hague Joint Declaration signed in The Hague, Netherlands, in order to resolve the roots of armed conflict, outlines the needed agreements in the following order:

=== Human Rights and International Humanitarian Law ===
This was signed as the Comprehensive Agreement on Respect for Human Rights and International Humanitarian Law or CARHRIHL on March 16, 1998. This document acknowledges the need of the two parties to apply International Humanitarian Law (IHL) in the ongoing armed conflict. Adjacent to this, designated persons of interest to the peace talks both from the side of the GRP and NDFP must be granted guarantees of protection and immunity under the signed GPH-NDFP Joint Agreement on Safety and Immunity Guarantees or JASIG on February 24, 1995.

=== Socio-economic reforms ===
This is known as the Comprehensive Agreement of Socio-Economic Reforms or CASER that was under agreement during the administration of Rodrigo Duterte but was stopped. Solving the socio-economic root causes of the armed struggle has been described as the "heart and soul" and "meat" of the peace negotiations. For the NDFP, the completion and mutual approval is a requirement for Political and Constitutional Reforms and the End of Hostilities and Disposition of Forces as the socio-economic problems of Filipinos serve as the root of the armed conflict. Proposals of the NDFP have stressed genuine agrarian reform and national industrialization.

=== Political and constitutional reforms ===
Known as the Comprehensive Agreement on Political and Constitutional Reforms (CAPCR), this deals with changes in the political framework of the country, including topics of social justice, form of government, self determination, and fiscal policy.

=== Cessation of hostilities and disposition of forces ===
Revolutionary forces have long asserted solving the roots of armed conflict, as well as crafting political changes as a prerequisite to laying down of armed forces. However, the GRP has set the conditions for the resumption of peace talks, including absolute ceasefire or capitulation. in response, the CPP said that "there should be no preconditions in the resumption of peace talks as stipulated in The Hague Joint Declaration."

== History ==
=== During the Corazon Aquino presidency ===
Following the People Power Revolution that ousted Ferdinand Marcos and allowed Corazon Aquino to assume the presidency, the Philippine government granted amnesty to political prisoners, including top CPP figures like Sison and Buscayno. In March 1986, the National Democratic Front of the Philippines announced its willingness to engage the Philippine government in a dialogue for a ceasefire between the AFP and the NPA. Preliminary talks between the Philippine government and the CPP began in August 1986, culminating in a two-month ceasefire agreement signed on November 27, 1986.

Despite preliminary talks, the Philippine government and the NDFP could not agree on the framework of the negotiations, with the NDFP asserting its belligerent status while the Philippine government demanded that the NDFP submit to the Philippine constitution. Negotiations finally broke down following the Mendiola massacre on January 22, 1987, which killed 13 protestors and injuring hundreds, with the NDFP pulling out of peace negotiations.

Attempts to resume peace talks began in 1990 when Representative Jose Yap met with Luis Jalandoni in the Netherlands to resume bilateral talks between the government and the NDFP. The Aquino presidency would however end with no substantive negotiations.

=== 2007 Arroyo amnesty proclamation ===
On 5 September 2007, President Gloria Macapagal Arroyo signed Amnesty Proclamation 1377 for members of the Communist Party of the Philippines and its armed wing, the New People's Army (NPA); other communist rebel groups; and their umbrella organization, the National Democratic Front. The amnesty will cover the crime of rebellion and all other crimes "in pursuit of political beliefs," but not including crimes against chastity, rape, torture, kidnapping for ransom, use and trafficking of illegal drugs and other crimes for personal ends and violations of international law or convention and protocols "even if alleged to have been committed in pursuit of political beliefs." The National Committee on Social Integration (NCSI) will issue a Certificate of Amnesty to qualified applicants. Implementing rules and regulations are being drafted and the decree will be submitted to the Senate of the Philippines and the House of Representatives of the Philippines for their concurrence. The proclamation becomes effective only after Congress has concurred.

=== During the Benigno Aquino III administration ===
The peace talks between the two sides have been intermittent and inconclusive since 1986, bogging down in 2012 when the government refused to free political prisoners.

=== During the Duterte administration ===
Peace talks resumed in August 2016, when Duterte released 19 rebel leaders from jail. However, President Duterte scrapped talks in February 2017, when rebels ambushed an army convoy, breaking a unilateral ceasefire that had held for five months. Both sides returned to the negotiating table on April 1, 2017.

In April 2017, peace talks between the National Democratic Front and the Philippine government brokered by Norway took place in the Netherlands, hoping to reach a political settlement in twelve months to end the conflict. This was the second time the two sides agreed on a bilateral truce since November 1986.

In 2019, the Duterte administration unilaterally declared the end of peace talks between the GRP and the NDFP, focusing instead on their counter-insurgency program Oplan Kapanatagan and what it terms as a "whole-of-nation" approach.

=== During the Marcos Jr. administration (2022–present) ===
After meeting informally for a year in the Netherlands and Norway, the Philippine government under Bongbong Marcos and the NDFP reached a consensus to resume peace talks on November 23, 2023. During the initial talks Marcos granted amnesty to former rebels of the CPP, including the Alex Boncayao Brigade, as well as the Moro Islamic Liberation Front and Moro National Liberation Front. As of March 2026, over 14,000 former members of the CPP-NPA-NDF and Alex Boncayao Brigade applied for amnesty. A speaker of the NTF-Elcac has called the high turnout "a quiet but decisive victory for peace". In 2026, in the wake of the Toboso clash, both Defense Secretary Gilbert Teodoro and National Security Adviser Eduardo Oban have publicly voiced their rejection of any peace talks with the CPP-NPA-NDF, while still supporting the amnesty program. Oban called the peace talks a "lifeline for a dying insurgency".

== Violations of international humanitarian law ==
Adherence and violations of international humanitarian law have been central discussions and motivating factors on the resumption or halting of the peace negotiations, where violations of IHL have been accused towards both the AFP and the belligerent NPA forces. Human rights groups like Karapatan have cited the existence of the National Task Force to End Local Communist Armed Conflict (NTF-ELCAC) and laws such as the Anti-Terrorism Act and Anti-Terrorist Financing and Suppression Act as impediments to the peace process.

Violations of human rights include extrajudicial killings of civilians and hors-de-combat, bombings of civilian communities, enforced disappearances, illegal arrests, and violations against NDFP peace consultants who carry rights of the JASIG. Prominent cases of said government violations of international humanitarian law included those cited in the killings of Ericson Acosta, Chad Booc (New Bataan massacre), and the Fausto family.

The AFP has said that it will not grant the status of belligerency to the communists, and thus, not in the scope of the IHL.

== See also ==
- New People's Army rebellion
- Bangsamoro peace process
