= Makabayang Kilusan ng Bagong Kababaihan =

Philippine militant left-wing nationalist revolutionary women's organization

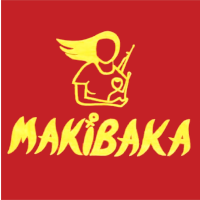
- Other name: MAKIBAKA; Malayang Kilusan ng Bagong Kababaihan (former name)
- Founded: April 18, 1970 (as Malayang Kilusan ng Bagong Kababaihan); March 11, 1971 (First National Congress as Makabayang Kilusan ng Bagong Kababaihan)
- Country: Philippines
- Allegiance: Communist Party of the Philippines
- Newspaper: Malayang Pilipina
- Ideology: Communism; National Democracy; Marxism-Leninism-Maoism
- Status: Active
- Part of: National Democratic Front of the Philippines

Makabayang Kilusan ng Bagong Kababaihan (Patriotic Movement of New Women) also known by the acronym MAKIBAKA, is a militant left-wing nationalist revolutionary women’s organization in the Philippines founded in April 1970. They are part of the National Democratic Front of the Philippines, a clandestine alliance of revolutionary organizations coming from all sectors of Philippine society.

== History and background ==
MAKIBAKA was founded in the wake of the First Quarter Storm, a time of growing political consciousness and student protest activity against the Ferdinand Marcos administration. Members of Kabataang Makabayan, Samahan ng Demokratikong Kabataan, Samahang Molave, and other mass organizations first began to meet to discuss the growing importance of women in the nascent national democratic movement.

Chafing at what they saw as gender bias against women in participating in activist work, members of these organizations first formed the Malayang Kilusan ng Bagong Kababaihan to address the particularity of women's oppression and garner wider support from women.

MAKIBAKA was officially launched on April 18, 1970, leading a protest of the Miss Philippines beauty pageant. Maria Lorena Barros, an SDK member and one of the founding members of MAKIBAKA, would become the de facto chairperson due to a need to provide journalists with a media reference for interviews. MAKIBAKA members participated in large protest actions during this time, including the Diliman Commune as well as the first commemoration of March 8 as International Working Women's Day, both in 1971.

Initially, MAKIBAKA had no defined structure. As the organization grew nationwide, issues of dual membership and the need for a separate organization for women became more important. Barros would eventually leave MAKIBAKA to join the New People's Army in late 1971, leaving the position of chairperson to Rosa Oli Mercado. In March 11-12, 1972, MAKIBAKA held its First National Congress at the Sampaloc University Center, which resolved organizational and structural issues, as well as electing a new set of National Officers. Vicky Segui was elected the National Chairperson of MAKIBAKA at this time. The name MAKIBAKA was also changed from Malayang Kilusan (Free Movement) to Makabayang Kilusan (Patriotic Movement) to reflect its aim of advancing women's liberation through the national democratic movement.

=== Under martial law ===
Revolutionary organizations such as MAKIBAKA were declared illegal and forced underground following the declaration of Martial Law by then dictator Ferdinand Marcos.

MAKIBAKA members were forced to go underground and join the New People's Army or other avenues of resistance against the Marcos dictatorship. MAKIBAKA became a member organization of the National Democratic Front of the Philippines and participated in organizing, propaganda, and education work in the countryside.

=== Post-martial law ===
MAKIBAKA held its Second Congress in 1988, drafting an updated program of action and electing Silvia Madiaga as Chairperson. In its Second Congress, MAKIBAKA approved the reestablishment of its National Office. Their third Congress was held in 1998, and their fourth Congress in 2002. Under the Fourth Congress, MAKIBAKA reaffirmed that it is a "women's organization advancing the national democratic struggle", while ratifying a new Constitution and Program of Action.

MAKIBAKA exists to this day as an underground organization, establishing chapters in the cities and the countryside.

== Ideology ==
MAKIBAKA believes that women's liberation can only be won through national democracy, genuine independence and true liberation of the Filipino people as a whole. As part of the National Democratic movement, they believe that there are three root problems to the suffering of the Filipino people, that being imperialism, feudalism, and bureaucrat capitalism. Through this analysis, Philippine society is understood to be semi-colonial and semi-feudal. Semi-colonial meaning that only a few wealthy families hold political and economic power, and that the country's economic policies are influenced by more powerful foreign economies and international financial institutions. Semi-feudal meaning that the country's farming system is also based on the Spanish colonial model, where only certain cash crops are grown on large estates called haciendas, rather than crops being grown for the benefit of the Filipino people themselves.
