= Gregorio Rosal =

Filipino politician and communist

- Born: 19 April 1947; Ibaan, Batangas, Philippines
- Died: 22 June 2011 (aged 64); Luzon, Philippines
- Other names: "Ka Roger"
- Years active: 1970s – 2011
- Known for: being Communist Party of the Philippines-New People's Army spokesperson

Gregorio Rosal (19 April 1947 – 22 June 2011) also known by his nom-de-guerre Ka Roger, was the leader of the Melito Glor Command of the New People's Army (NPA) in the Southern Tagalog region of the Philippines, and spokesperson of the Communist Party of the Philippines (CPP) from 1994 until 2006.

== Early life ==
Roger Rosal was the third of six children born to Pablo Rosal and Crispina Crusat, both of whom were sugar plantation workers. His brother and sisters were Nicetas, Bernardo, Felicidad, Emilia and Remedios. He was an honors student in Ibaan Elementary School and St. James Academy in high school, and did odd jobs, sold mosquito nets and worked as a jueteng collector for his livelihood. He began attending college at Golden Gate Colleges in Batangas City in 1971 at the age of 24 but dropped out in his second year and had become a member of the Communist Party of the Philippines before Ferdinand Marcos declared martial law in 1972. He was also a trade union organizer and student activist, being a member of Kabataang Makabayan. In 1973, he was captured by government security forces and incarcerated at Camp Vicente Lim in Laguna, but managed to escape five months later. Rosal joined the New People's Army shortly thereafter.

== Career ==
Rosal was assigned the task of establishing NPA forces in the Southern Tagalog and Bicol provinces during the 1970s and the 1980s. Rosal became the Communist Party of the Philippines' national spokesperson in 1994, bringing the CPP's statements into Filipino households via television and radio interviews. He welcomed visiting journalists into the NPA's encampments, often arranging these himself. He was implicated by former CPP Central Committee chairman Rodolfo Salas as one of the leaders of a deadly purge of suspected spies within the rebel movement in Southern Tagalog in 1988 called "Operation Missing Link". However, the CPP issued a statement in 2003 clearing him of major culpability. Some sources state that he was "severely criticized and disciplined" for failing to stop the purge; however his punishment was "unspecified".

== Death ==
Rosal had suffered strokes at least three times; the first was in 1997, the second in 2000 and the last in 2006. He recovered from the first two episodes and returned to his duties in the communist movement. His third attack was more serious; it led to a gradual deterioration of his health until he could no longer discharge his duties. For the last five years of his life, he was cared for by cadre who provided for his security and medical requirements. He died on 22 June 2011 in an undisclosed location in Luzon from the effects of a heart attack. The CPP issued a statement announcing his death four months later. Rosal's cremated remains and that of his wife were re-buried in Ibaan, his hometown in Batangas in 2016, five years after his death.

== Personal life ==
Roger Rosal was married to Rosario; her maiden name is either Lodronio, or Dumanais; they have two daughters, one of which – Andrea, is the alleged secretary of the NPA sub-regional military area in the Southern Tagalog region. Rosario Lodronio was also a member of the communist revolutionary movement who died in a firefight in 2011; the NPA's Rosario Lodronio Rosal Command operating in Infanta, Quezon is named in her honor.

Rosal was said to have liked playing softball and that he was religious. He also enjoyed playing musical instruments such as the guitar and harmonica, and singing as well. He once referred to himself as "the singing terrorist".

== See also ==
- Communist rebellion in the Philippines
- Jose Maria Sison
- National Democratic Front
