= Moro Resistance and Liberation Organization =

2005–present Philippine armed secessionist group

- Bagong Alyansang Makabayan ng mga Moro
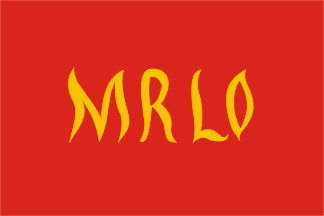
- Dates active: 2005 – present
- Country: Philippines
- Active regions: Mindanao, Philippines
- Political position: Far-left

The Moro Resistance and Liberation Organization (MRLO) is an active armed secessionist group participating in the Moro conflict. It was established by the National Democratic Front of the Philippines (NDFP) as one of its Moro subdivisions, and was the 16th organization created by the NDF to fight under its leadership. The group has consistently condemned the Philippine government's military operations in Mindanao, accusing them of violence against Moro civilians.
