= National Democracy (Philippines) =

Political movement in the Philippines

National Democracy (ND; Filipino: Pambansang Demokrasya) or the National Democratic Left, known colloquially as NatDem, is a political ideology and movement in the Philippines that aims to establish a people's democracy in the country under the guidance of a communist vanguard party. The movement seeks to address what it deems to be the "root causes of social injustices affecting the Filipino masses" in what is analyzed to be a "semi-colonial and semi-feudal society", by confronting the "three fundamental problems" of imperialism, feudalism, and "bureaucrat capitalism".

== History and background ==
The national democratic movement has its origins in opposition to former president Ferdinand Marcos during the late 1960s and early 1970s, but in its entirety is interpreted by the ND as a continuation of struggles since the 1896 Philippine Revolution led by the Katipunan. As a result of sustained economic, political, and military abuses during the Marcos dictatorship, several figures such as Jose Maria Sison (writing under the eponym Amado Guerrero) proposed that the creation of a revolutionary mass movement of a national democratic character was necessary to overcome the "three basic problems" underpinning the oppressive conditions of Philippine society in the 1970s. Sison's vision uses Maoist principles for social analysis and in carrying out people's democracy or national democracy:

Under the present concrete conditions of Philippine society which are semi-colonial and semi-feudal, the Communist Party has to wage a national democratic revolution of a new type, a people's democratic revolution. Though its leadership is proletarian, the Philippine Revolution is not yet a proletarian-socialist revolution. We should not confuse the national-democratic stage and the socialist stage of the Philippine Revolution. Only after the national-democratic stage has been completed can the proletarian revolutionary leadership carry out the socialist revolution as the transitional stage towards communism. — Philippine Society and Revolution p.78

Once martial law was lifted in 1981 and Corazon Aquino was elected to the Presidency in 1986 after the People Power Revolution, corruption and abuse of government power remained endemic in the Philippine political system, which according to the ND were exemplified by the Mendiola massacre, the counter-insurgency programs waged against the armed groups of the Moro Islamic Liberation Front and the New People's Army, embezzlement and graft during the terms of Joseph Estrada and Gloria Macapagal Arroyo, and the 2004 Hacienda Luisita massacre. According to the analysis espoused since the 1970s by Sison and others, the continuation of human rights violations in the Philippines at the hands of government officials and other social, economic, and political injustices highlight the need of liberating the nation the imperialist forces—primarily led, from what ND proponents identifies, the United States. As a former U.S. colony, the Philippines' dynamic with the United States dates back to the Philippine–American War.

== Organizations ==
The national democratic movement is divided into underground and legal groups. The National Democratic Front of the Philippines (NDFP) is the underground, revolutionary coalition of various national democratic groups that comprise organizations such as the Communist Party of the Philippines, New People's Army, Kabataang Makabayan, and Malayang Kilusan ng Bagong Kababaihan (MAKIBAKA)

The legal groups are collectively known as national democratic mass organizations. Most of these groups participate in the country's national elections and are not part of the on-going armed struggle. The national democratic movement of the Philippines is also interwoven with a larger global alliance: the International League of Peoples' Struggle (ILPS), in which Joma Sison served as its founder and chairman emeritus.
