= Jose Maria Sison =

Filipino communist leader (1939–2022)

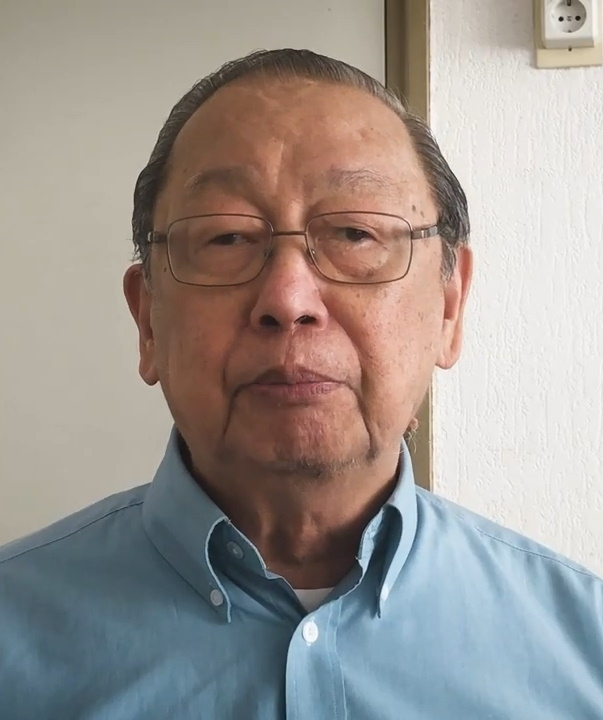
- Sison in 2020

Founding Chairperson of the Communist Party of the Philippines
- In office December 26, 1968 – 1977
- Preceded by: Position established
- Succeeded by: Rodolfo Salas

Personal details
- Born: Jose Maria Canlas Sison; February 8, 1939 Cabugao, Ilocos Sur, Commonwealth of the Philippines
- Died: December 16, 2022 (aged 83) Utrecht, Netherlands
- Party: CPP (1968–2022)
- Other political affiliations: NDF (1973–2022); PKP-1930 (1962–1968)
- Spouse: Julieta de Lima (m. 1959)
- Children: 4
- Education: University of the Philippines Diliman (BA, MA)
- Website: josemariasison.com

Military service
- Allegiance: New People's Army
- Battles/wars: New People's Army rebellion

Jose Maria Canlas Sison (Tagalog: [hoˈse mɐˈɾija kɐnˈlas ˈsisɔn]; February 8, 1939 – December 16, 2022), also known as Joma (Tagalog: [dʒ'ma]), was a Filipino writer, poet, and activist who founded and led the Communist Party of the Philippines (CPP) and added elements of Maoism to its philosophy—which would be known as National Democracy. His ideology was formed by applying Marxism–Leninism–Maoism to the history and circumstances of the Philippines.

Sison was born in Ilocos Sur to a landowning political family. He was educated in Manila, studying at Ateneo de Manila University, Colegio de San Juan de Letran, and the University of the Philippines. He then became a professor of literature, political science, and Rizal studies. During his youth, he learned about the rebellion of the communist Hukbalahap (Huk), which ended in 1954. Sison joined the Partido Komunista ng Pilipinas (PKP; "Philippine Communist Party") in 1962 and became a member of its executive committee in early 1963. In 1964 he co-founded the Kabataang Makabayan ("Patriotic Youth"). However, Sison's faction had several disagreements with the PKP leading to the First Great Rectification Movement. After Sison's faction were expelled from the PKP, he founded and became the chairman of the Communist Party of the Philippines (CPP) in 1968. Three months later, Sison and Bernabe Buscayno, who led a faction of Huk holdouts, organized the New People's Army (NPA) to stage a proletarian revolution. Sison was captured in 1977 and was imprisoned, mostly in solitary confinement, until the People Power Revolution of 1986. The new government under President Corazon Aquino released him for the sake of "national reconciliation" and for his role in opposing the martial law regime of President Ferdinand Marcos. Nonetheless, he also criticized the Aquino administration. In 1988, while in the Netherlands as part of his international lecture tour, his passport was revoked and he was charged in the Philippines for violating the Anti-Subversion Act. From then on, he lived in the Netherlands but continued to advise the communist movement in the Philippines.

From August 2002, Sison had been classified as a "person supporting terrorism" by the United States. The European Court of First Instance ruled in September 2009 to delist him as a "person supporting terrorism" and reversed a decision by member governments to freeze his assets. Sison was charged with several counts of murder in the Philippines and the Netherlands (later dropped). He died in exile in 2022.

The CPP, NPA, and the National Democratic Front (NDF) are considered terrorist organizations by the Philippines' Anti-Terrorism Council.

== Early years ==
Jose Maria Canlas Sison was born on February 8, 1939, in Cabugao, Ilocos Sur to a prominent landowning family with ancestry from Spanish-Mexican-Malay mestizos and from Fujian, China, and with connections to other prominent clans such as the Crisólogos, Geraldinos, Vergaras, Azcuetas, Sollers, Serranos and Singsons.

Sison's father, Salustiano Sison, was a "vocally strong support of Claro Mayo Recto and had a mix of "strong feudalist orientation" and "anti-imperialist sentiment." His mother, Florentina Canlas Sison, was part of a landed family in Mexico, Pampanga. As a child, Sison's parent nicknamed him "Cheng."

His great-grandfather, Don Leandro Serrano, was the biggest landlord in northern Luzon at the end of the 19th century. His grandfather, Don Gorgonio Soller Sison, was the last gobernadorcillo of Cabugao under Spanish colonial rule, the municipal president under the Philippine revolutionary government, and the first mayor under US colonial rule. His great-uncle, Don Marcelino Crisólogo was the first governor of Ilocos Sur. His uncle, Teófilo Sison was governor of Pangasinan and the first Defense Secretary in the Commonwealth government. He was convicted in 1946 of having collaborated with the Japanese occupation forces but was amnestied in 1947.

During his childhood in Ilocos, he learned about the Huk rebellion in Central Luzon from Ilocano farm workers and from his mother. In his early high school years in Manila, he talked to his barber about Hukbalahap activities. Unlike his elder siblings, he attended a public school before entering Ateneo de Manila University and later studying at Colegio de San Juan de Letran.

Sison graduated from the University of the Philippines in 1959 with the degree of Bachelor of Arts in English literature with honors and then studied Indonesian in Indonesia before returning to the Philippines and becoming a university professor of literature and eventually Rizal Studies and Political Science. He joined the Lavaite Partido Komunista ng Pilipinas in December 1962 and became a member of its executive committee in early 1963. He was the Vice Chairman of the Lapiang Manggagawa (which eventually became the Socialist Party) and the general secretary of the Movement for the Advancement of Nationalism. In 1964, he co-founded the Kabataang Makabayan, or Patriotic Youth, with Nilo S. Tayag. This organization organized youth against the Vietnam War, Ferdinand Marcos, imperialism, bureaucrat capitalism and feudalism. The organization also spearheaded the study of Maoism as part of 'the struggle'.

== Communist activities ==
On December 26, 1968, he formed and led the Central Committee of the Communist Party of the Philippines (CPP), an organization founded on Marxism–Leninism-Maoism, stemming from his experience as a youth leader and labor and land reform activist. This was known as the First Great Rectification Movement where Sison and other radical youth criticized the existing party leadership for its errors and failures since 1942. The old Communist Party had been run under a series of Moscow-leaning general secretaries from the Lava family. The reestablished CPP set its general political line as a two-stage revolution comprising national-democratic as the first stage then proceeding to the socialist revolution. During this period, Sison went by the nom de guerre of Amado Guerrero, meaning "beloved warrior", under which he published the book manifesto Philippine Society and Revolution.

After this, the old Communist Party sought to eliminate and marginalize Sison. However, the reorganized CPP had a larger base and renewed political line that attracted thousands to join its ranks. On March 29, 1969, the CPP, along with an HMB (Huk) faction led by Bernabe Buscayno, organized the New People's Army (NPA), the guerrilla-military wing of the party, whose guerrilla fronts, numbering more than 110, are nationwide and cover substantial portions of 75 of the 81 Philippine provinces. The NPA seeks to wage a peasant-worker revolutionary war in the countryside against landlords and foreign companies by operating in rural communities and mountains as strategy for protection.

Sison was arrested on November 8, 1977, in La Union during the Marcos presidency and imprisoned for almost nine years, most of which were spent in solitary confinement. Sison wrote prolifically while incarcerated, including his Basic Principles of Marxism-Leninism: A Primer, which his wife Julie de Lima smuggled out of prison in 1982.

Sison was released from military detention on March 5, 1986, after the overthrow of Marcos. He was released by the new administration of President Corazon Aquino for the sake of "national reconciliation" and for his role in opposing Marcos. The release of Sison was vehemently protested by the military. His experience in prison is described in Prison & Beyond, a book of poetry released in 1986 which won the Southeast Asia WRITE award for the Philippines.

Sison returned to teach at the University of the Philippines soon after. He then went on a global lecture tour, starting in September 1986. It is reported that upon his release, Sison and his followers actively sought to discredit the Aquino government in the European media by speaking out on Aquino's human rights violations, including the Mendiola massacre, in which members of the military were accused of firing on unarmed peasants in Manila, killing 17 people. Also in 1986, Sison embarked on a world tour. In October 1986, he accepted the Southeast Asia Writers Award for a book of his poems from the Crown Prince of Thailand in Bangkok.

In 1989, Sison was cited in journalist Gregg Jones' book Red Revolution as having coordinated the Plaza Miranda bombing in August 1971 based on interviews with members of the CPP and the NPA.

== Exile in the Netherlands ==
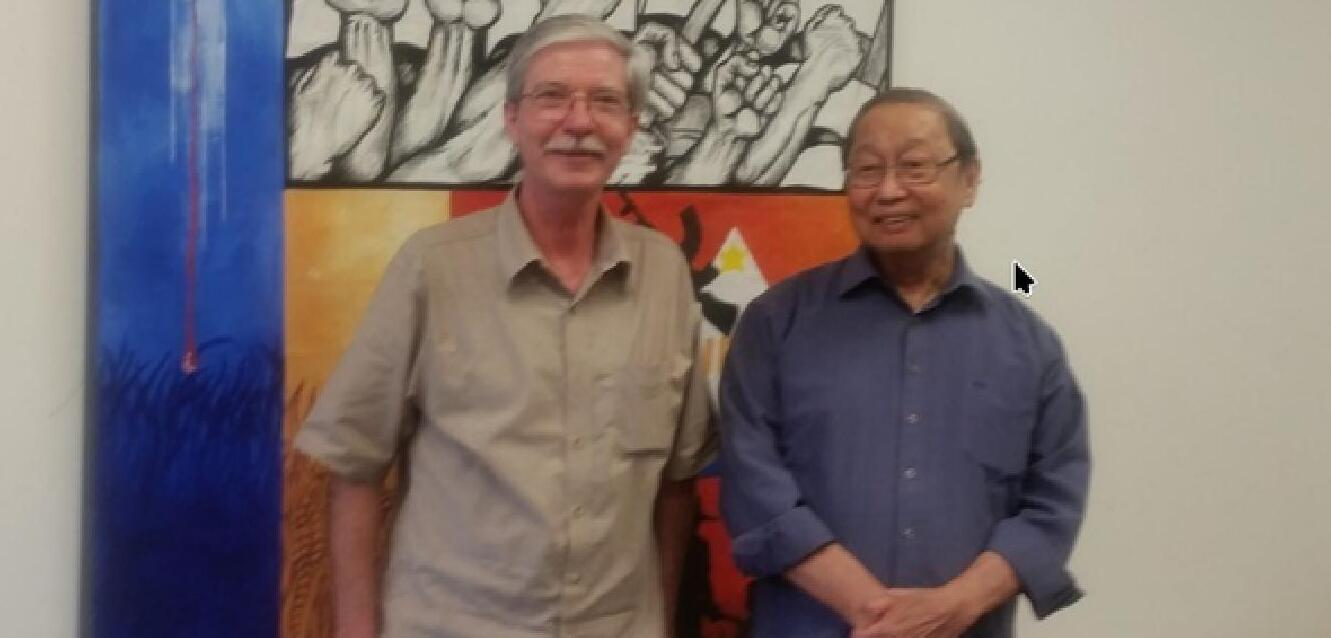
Sison in 2017, meeting with Mick Kelly of the Freedom Road Socialist Organization.

Since 1987, Sison had based himself in the Netherlands for his European lecture tour. While in the Netherlands in September 1988, he was informed that his passport had been revoked and that charges had been filed against him under the Anti-Subversion Law of the Philippines. The charges were ultimately dropped, including those that were subsequently filed by Philippine authorities. He applied for political asylum in the Netherlands in 1988 after his Philippine passport was cancelled by the Philippine government. His application was ultimately denied, however Dutch and European law protected him from deportation to the Philippines. Since 1992, he had lived in the Netherlands as a recognized political refugee.

The CPP has stated for over 20 years that Sison was no longer involved in operational decisions and has served from Europe in an advisory role as chief political consultant of the National Democratic Front in peace negotiations with the Manila government.

=== 2007 arrest ===
The International Crime Investigation Team of the Dutch National Criminal Investigation Department arrested Jose Maria Sison in Utrecht on August 28, 2007. Sison was arrested for his alleged involvement from the Netherlands in three assassinations that took place in the Philippines: the murder of Romulo Kintanar in 2003, and the murders of Arturo Tabara and Stephen Ong in 2006. On the day of his arrest, Sison's apartment and the apartments of his co-workers were searched by the Dutch National Criminal Investigation Department.

Some 100 left-wing activists held a demonstration for the release of Sison, marching towards the Dutch embassy in Manila on August 30, 2007. The demonstration was swiftly ended by police.

There were no plans to hold the trial in the Philippines since there was no extradition request and the crimes Sison was accused of were committed in the Netherlands. Dutch lawyer Victor Koppe said that Sison would enter a plea of not guilty during his indictment. He could have received the maximum penalty of life imprisonment.

On September 1, 2007, National Democratic Front peace panel chair Luis Jalandoni confirmed that the Dutch government was "maltreating" Sison because the court detained him in solitary confinement for several weeks without access to media, newspapers, television, radio or visitors; it also denied him the right to bring prescription medicines to his cell. The place where Sison was held was the same one used by the late former Yugoslav president Slobodan Milosevic who was held for war crimes and corruption. Meanwhile, protests were held in Indonesia, Hong Kong, Australia, the United States, and Canada. The Communist Party of the Philippines (CPP) feared that Sison may be "extra-judicially" transferred to the United States. CPP spokesman Gregorio Rosal said that the U.S. may detain and subject Sison to extraordinary rendition in Guantanamo Bay or some secret facility. U.S. ambassador Kristie Ann Kenney formally announced that the U.S. will extend support to the Dutch government to prosecute Sison.

In New York City, former United States Attorney General and left-wing human rights lawyer Ramsey Clark called for Sison's release and pledged assistance by joining the latter's legal defense team headed by Belgian lawyer Jan Fermon. Clark doubted Dutch authorities' validity and competency, since the murder charges originated in the Philippines and had already been dismissed by the country's Supreme Court.

Committee DEFEND, an International group stated that the Dutch government tortured Sison at the National Penitentiary in Scheveningen. His wife, Julie De Lima, failed to see him in order to provide him with medicine and warm clothes on August 30, 2007. Meanwhile, Sison's counsel, Romeo Capulong, questioned the Dutch government's jurisdiction over the issue, alleging that the Supreme Court of the Philippines already dismissed the subject cases on July 2.

On September 7, 2007, the Dutch court heard defense arguments for Sison, and stated that it would issue the resolution next week on whether to extend the detention. Supporters outside The Hague District Court chanted slogans while the wife, Julie De Lima stated that they complained to the International Committee of the Red Cross. Luis Jalandoni, chairman of the National Democratic Front, accused the government of Prime Minister Jan Peter Balkenende of being "a workhorse" for Philippines President Gloria Macapagal Arroyo and for the U.S. government.

The National Lawyers Guild (NLG), a progressive bar association in New York then headed by Marjorie Cohn, denounced the arrest of Sison, saying "it exposes the hand of the Arroyo administration in yet another assault on the rights of the people to dissent and organize". Sison will remain in jail until Thursday, but was provided TV, radio and medication.

On September 12, 2007, lawyers Edre Olalia and Rachel Pastores stated that Sison's lawyers will appeal the reported Dutch court's newly promulgated ruling extending Sison's detention for 90 days. The Dutch court did not extend the detention for 90 days but released him on September 13, 2007, after being held in solitary confinement for 17 days.

==== Release from detention ====
Dutch public prosecutor's office's Wim de Bruin stated that Sison was released from jail at 10:45 a.m. on September 13, 2007. The court ruled that there was insufficient evidence to detain him on murder charges, specifically, if Sison "had a Concious [sic] and close cooperation with those in the Philippines who carried out the deed".

On September 27, 2007, Sison appeared before The Hague Court of Appeal panel of 3 judges on the public prosecutor's appeal against the district court's September 13 judgment of release.

On September 28, 2007, the Dutch Ambassador to the Philippines, Robert Brinks, announced that 3 Dutch judicial officials and Dutch prosecution lawyer Wim De Bruin will visit the Philippines "later this year" to review the evidence against Jose Maria Sison. The next day, Leung Kwok Hung, a Hong Kong politician and member of the April Fifth Action vowed to support Sison. Leung was in Europe at the Inter-Parliamentary Union assembly in Geneva, Switzerland. He sits in the Hong Kong legislature as a member of the Finance and House Committees, and of the Legislative Panels on Constitutional Affairs, Housing, Manpower, Transport, and Welfare Services.

On October 3, 2007, the Dutch court dismissed the prosecution's appeal against the release Sison, confirming his freedom while the Dutch police continue to investigate: "the prosecution file lacks enough concrete clues that Sison can be directly linked to the assassinations which is needed to prosecute him as a perpetrator". However, the decision does not bar prosecution for murder. But the Dutch Public Prosecutor's Office (per spokesman Wim de Bruin) stated that it did not drop the charges against Sison yet, who remains a suspect. De Bruin said: "No, you have to separate the criminal investigation by the police from the investigation by the examining judge in The Hague. So the judge decided to finish the investigation but the police investigation will be continued and that means that Mr. Sison is still a suspect."

The Dutch court, the Dutch court on May 20, 2008, heard Sison's appeal against the Dutch Public Prosecutors Office's request to extend its investigation until December, since the investigators arrived in the Philippines in February and interviewed witnesses. At the trial, however, the new evidence showed that there were indeed attempts to kill him, in 1999 and 2000, while Kintanar's wife, Joy, directly accused Edwin Garcia in the murder of her husband. The Dutch court scheduled the promulgation on the verdict on June 10, 2008.

The Dutch District Court of The Hague on June 5, 2008, decided in camera "that the Public Prosecution Service may continue the prosecution of Jose Maria Sison for involvement in, among other matters, a number of murders committed in the Philippines in 2003 and 2004; that while the prosecution's case file still held insufficient evidence, the investigation was ongoing and should be given time to unfold". In February 2010, the Dutch Public Prosecution Service finally terminated its investigation of Sison and dropped the criminal charges against him.

== Personal life ==
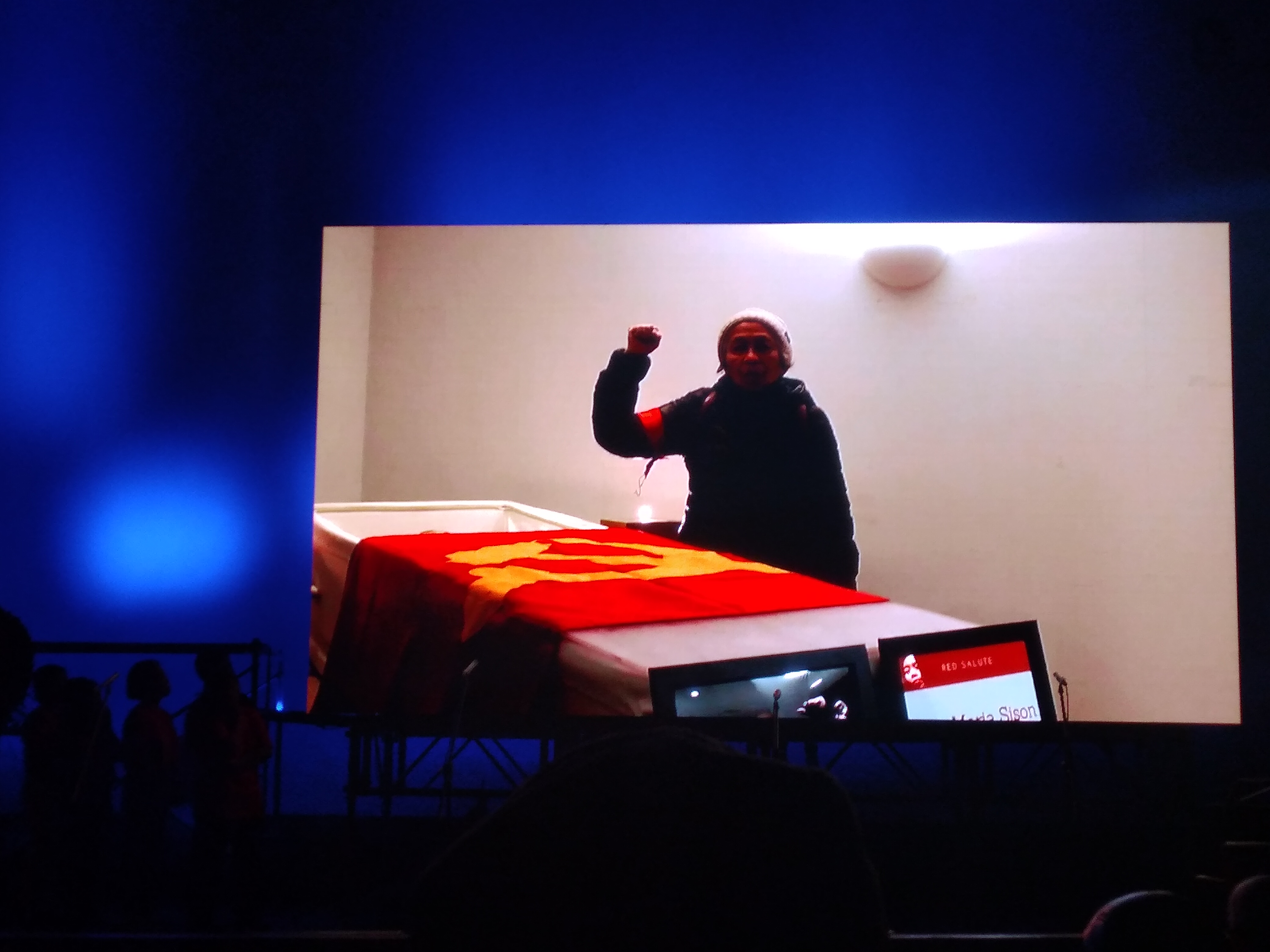
De Lima giving tribute in front of her late husband in Utrecht.

Sison met his wife, Julie de Lima, when both were students at UP Diliman. Attending the same study groups, they grew closer and married first in a civil wedding in September 1959 and then in a Catholic church wedding in January 1960. The couple had four children.

His wife belonged to the prominent De Lima family of Iriga City, Camarines Sur and is the aunt of Leila de Lima, who served as Chair of the Commission on Human Rights during the presidency of Gloria Macapagal-Arroyo, Secretary of the Philippine Department of Justice under the administration of President Benigno S. Aquino III., and Senator during the administration of President Rodrigo Duterte.

He was the chairperson of the International League of Peoples' Struggle, and the Chief Political Consultant of the National Democratic Front of the Philippines.

== Later life and death ==
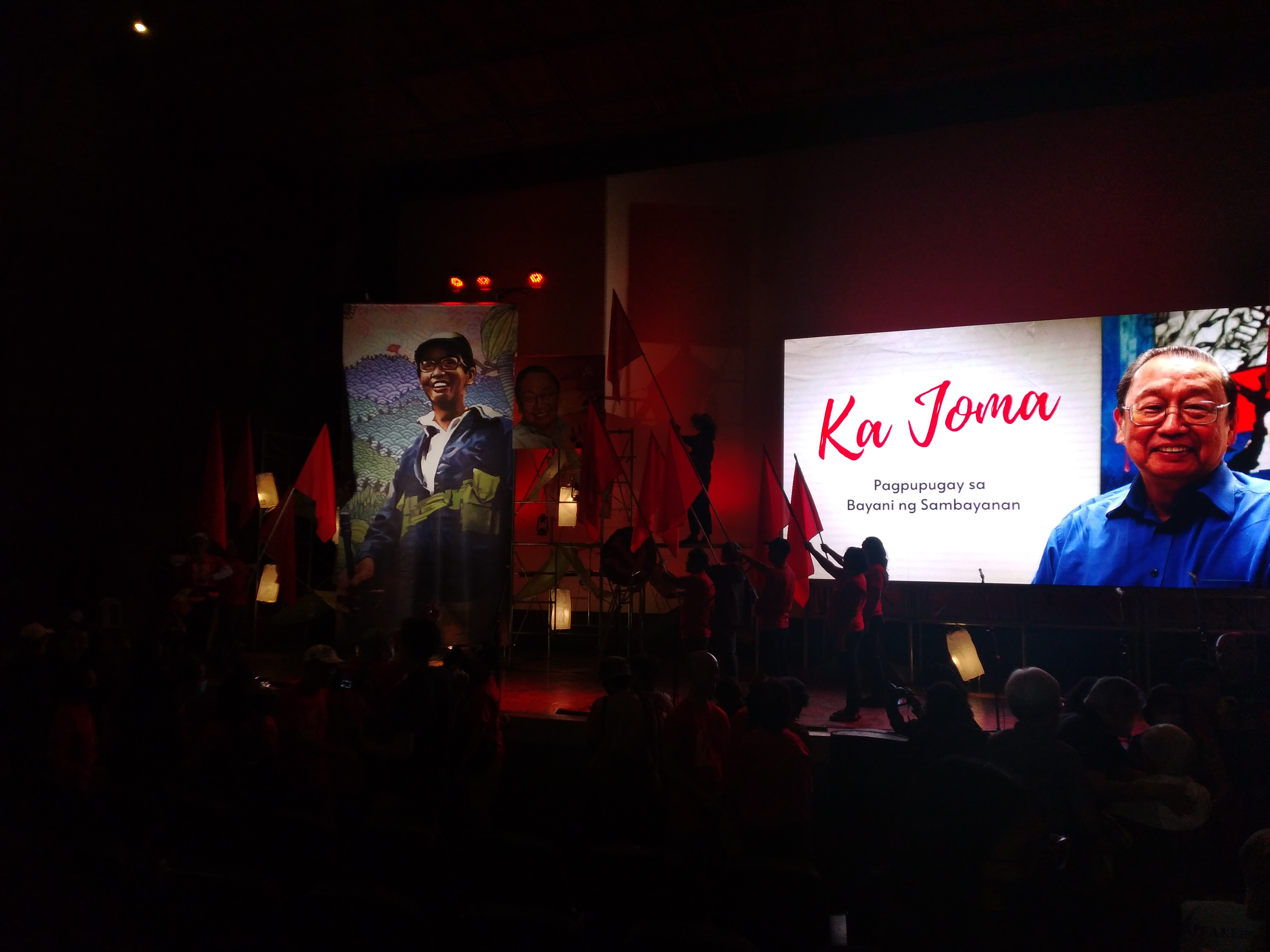
Tribute given to Sison, 2022.

In 2017, President Rodrigo Duterte, claimed that Sison had colon cancer. Sison, while admitting he has been hospitalized at the Utrecht University Medical Center in March of that in year connection to his rheumatoid arthritis and Sweet syndrome symptoms, said that he had no serious illness, including cancer. In early 2022, reports emerged that Sison had died; Sison himself refuted his supposed death. Later that year, on December 16, the Communist Party of the Philippines, alongside its news organ Ang Bayan, announced the death of Sison after he had been in hospital in Utrecht, Netherlands, for two weeks. NDFP executive Luis Jalandoni disclosed that Sison died due to heart failure after almost three weeks of hospital treatment, although he did not provide more details about Sison's death.

== Controversies ==
Former Senator Jovito Salonga accused Sison of orchestrating the 1971 Plaza Miranda bombing during the Liberal Party convention to force Marcos to suspend the writ of habeas corpus and sign Proclamation No. 1081, initiating the advent of Martial Law in the Philippines. This accusation comes from former CPP members such as Victor Corpuz and others. The Philippine National Police (PNP) filed a criminal case against Sison for the Plaza Miranda bombing, but the charges were dismissed for lack of evidence, with the dismissal order citing the complainant's filing criminal charges based on speculation.

On July 4, 2008, Manila's RTC Executive Judge Reynaldo Ros assumed jurisdiction over the 1,551-page cases of multiple murder lawsuits against Sison, Bayan Muna Representative Satur Ocampo, and National Democratic Front member Luis Jalandoni after the Supreme Court's Third Division ordered a change of venue from the Hilongos, Leyte RTC Branch 18 for safety reasons. During the time when these alleged killings supposedly took place, Sison and Ocampo had long been under maximum detention of the Marcos regime. Sison, Ocampo, and other political detainees were only freed in 1986 after the first EDSA uprising of the same year.

The European Union's second highest court ruled to delist Sison and the Stichting Al-Aqsa group from the EU terror list since the 27-nation bloc failed to respect their rights when blacklisted. The Luxembourg-based Court of Justice further reversed a decision by member governments to freeze the assets of Sison and the Netherlands-based Al-Aqsa Foundation, since the EU governments failed to inform them why the assets were frozen. Dekker said that EU lawyers in Brussels can lodge any appeal. The EU was also ordered to shoulder all the litigation expenses during the five-year appeal of Sison against the Dutch government and the EU. The final judgment of the European Court of Justice to remove Sison from the EU terrorist blacklist on September 30, 2009, became final and binding on December 10, 2009, inasmuch as the EU did not make an appeal. The court's decisions and other documents pertaining to cases involving Sison in the Philippines are compiled under the section of Legal Cases in www.josemariasison.org and can be further verified in the archives of the pertinent courts.

== Legacy ==
Two biographies have been written about him: one by the German writer Dr. Rainer Werning: The Philippine Revolution: From the Leader's View Point (1989), and one by the Filipina activist Ninotchka Rosca, At Home in the World (2004). Two biographical films about Sison were produced: The Guerrilla Is a Poet (2013), directed by sisters Sari and Kiri Dalena, and Tibak (2016), written and directed by journalist Arlyn dela Cruz.

Since his death, national democratic organizations in Manila launched the Jose Maria Sison School, involving hundreds of youth, union members and activists in a re-examination of the Joma's teachings. Leftists from Berkeley to Rome followed suit.

Many activists and scholars have continued Sison's legacy in different ways. On February 15, 2025, key leaders of the national democratic movement launched the Jose Maria Sison Legacy Foundation (JMSLF) in Utrecht, The Netherlands to preserve the legacy of the Communist Party of the Philippines (CPP) founder.

Maybelle Guerrero has called for revolutionaries to review Sison's work and to take up his unfinished tasks, such as his repeated call to revive the armed city partisan teams to address human rights violators in the urban areas.

== Works ==
=== Selected writings 1968–1991 ===
- 2013. 1968-1972 Foundation for Resuming the Philippine Revolution. International Network for Philippine Studies and Aklat ng Bayan, Inc.
- 2013. 1969-1974 Defeating Revisionism, Reformism & and Opportunism. International Network for Philippine Studies and Aklat ng Bayan, Inc.
- 2013. 1972-1977 Building Strength through Struggle. International Network for Philippine Studies and Aklat ng Bayan, Inc.
- 2013. 1977-1986 Detention and Defiance against Dictatorship. International Network for Philippine Studies and Aklat ng Bayan, Inc.
- 2015. 1986-1991 Continuing the Struggle for National & Social Liberation. International Network for Philippine Studies and Aklat ng Bayan, Inc.

=== Selected writings 1991–2009 ===
- 2009. 1991-1994 For Justice, Socialism and Peace. Aklat ng Bayan, Inc.
- 2009. 1995-2001 For Democracy and Socialism Against Imperialist Globalization. Aklat ng Bayan, Inc.
- 2009. 2001-2006 Crisis of Imperialism and People's Resistance. Aklat ng Bayan, Inc.
- 2009. 2006-2009 People's Struggle Against Imperialist Plunder and Terror. Aklat ng Bayan, Inc.

=== Peoples' struggles against oppression and exploitation: selected writings 2009–2015 ===
- 2015. 2009-2010 Crisis Generates Resistance. International Network for Philippine Studies
- 2016. 2010-2011 Building People's Power. International Network for Philippine Studies
- 2017. 2012 Combat Neoliberal Globalization. International Network for Philippine Studies
- 2018. 2013 Struggle against Imperialist Plunder and Wars. International Network for Philippine Studies
- 2018. 2014-2015 Strengthen the People's Struggle against Imperialism and Reaction. International Network for Philippine Studies

=== Selected writings 2016–2021 ===
- 2018. 2016 People's Resistance to Greed and Terror. International Network for Philippine Studies
- 2019. 2017 Combat Tyranny and Fascism. International Network for Philippine Studies
- 2019. January–July 2018 Struggle against Terrorism and Tyranny Volume I. International Network for Philippine Studies
- 2019. August–December 2018 Struggle against Terrorism and Tyranny Volume II. International Network for Philippine Studies
- 2021. 2019 Resist Neoliberalism, Fascism, and Wars of Aggression. International Network for Philippine Studies

=== Other works ===
- 2020. Basic Principles of Marxism–Leninism: A Primer. Reprint. Paris, Foreign Languages Press
- 2019. Reflections on Revolution and Prospects. International Network for Philippine Studies
- 2017. Specific Characteristics of our People's War. Reprint. Paris, Foreign Languages Press
- 2003. US Terrorism and War in the Philippines. Netherlands, Papieren Tijger
- 1998. Philippine Economy and Politics. Co-authored by Julieta de Lima. Philippines, Aklat ng Bayan, Inc.
- 1989. The Philippine Revolution : The Leader's View. With Rainer Werning. New York : Crane Russak.
- 1984. Prison and Beyond: Selected Poems, 1958–1983. Quezon City: Free Jose Maria Sison Committee.
- 1971. Philippine Society and Revolution. As Amado Guerrero. Manila: Pulang Tala.
- 1967. Struggle for National Democracy. Quezon City, Progressive Publications
