= National Democratic Mass Organization =

Term for Philippine National Democratic organizations

National Democratic Mass Organization (NDMO) is a collective term in the Philippines for sectoral mass organizations that subscribe to National Democratic principles.

These organizations are frequently red-tagged by the Philippine government and the military, as NDMOs recognize, but do not openly support, the Communist rebellion in the Philippines because of their belief that the roots of poverty such as imperialism, feudalism, and "bureaucrat capitalism" are still very much alive in the Philippines. In a statement, Bagong Alyansang Makabayan (Bayan) secretary-general Renato Reyes explained that they refuse to condemn armed struggle in the Philippines because they claim that doing so “will only lead to the denial of the social basis of armed conflict and falls right into the militarist approach.”

Notable examples of NDMOs in the country include Bahaghari Philippines, Anakbayan, League of Filipino Students, Student Christian Movement of the Philippines, Panday Sining, SINAGBAYAN, Alliance of Concerned Teachers, Anakpawis, GABRIELA, and Kabataan Partylist.
