= Kabataang Makabayan =

Philippine underground national democratic youth organization

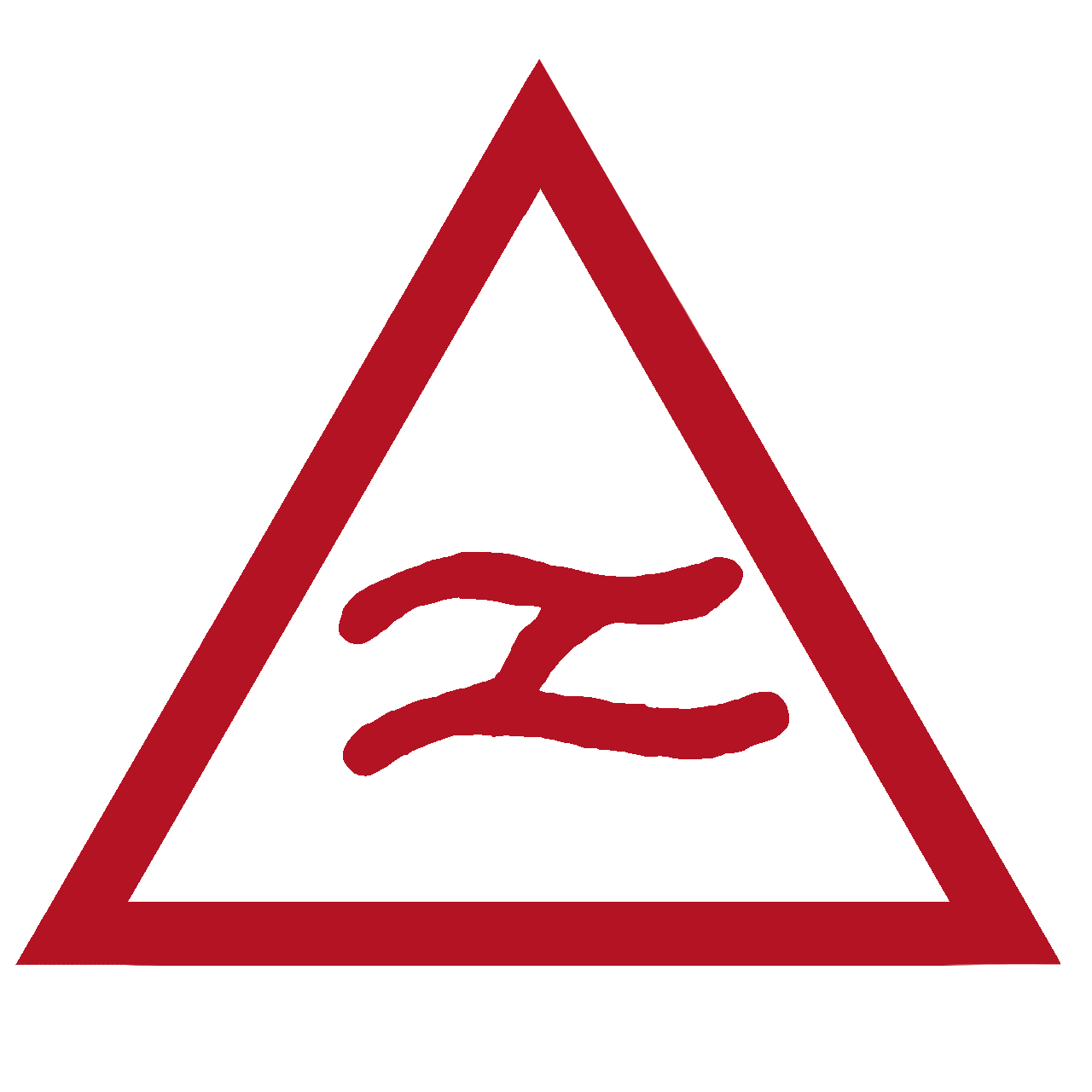
- The official logo of KM as defined in their Constitution
- Other name: KM
- Founded: November 30, 1964
- Country: Philippines
- Allegiance: Communist Party of the Philippines
- Newspaper: Kalayaan
- Ideology: Communism; National Democracy; Marxism-Leninism-Maoism
- Status: Active
- Part of: National Democratic Front of the Philippines

Kabataang Makabayan ("Patriotic Youth"), also known by the acronym KM, is an underground communist youth organization in the Philippines which has been active since 1964. It was banned by the Philippine government in 1972 when then-President Ferdinand Marcos declared martial law, and was driven underground. It was dissolved in 1975 along with other National Democratic mass organizations, as part of the National Democratic movement's change of strategy against the Marcos regime. Revived within the Manila-Rizal area in 1977 and later nationally in 1984, the organization continues to exist.

== History ==
Kabataang Makabayan originated from the Students' Cultural Association of UP (SCAUP) in the University of the Philippines and was initially organized as the youth arm of the Partido Komunista ng Pilipinas-1930 by José María Sison, Ernesto Macahiya, Nilo Tayag, and others. Sison envisioned the youth group as revolutionaries who would establish a country led by the working class instead of oligarchic politicians. It was established on November 30, 1964, Bonifacio Day, to emphasize continuity with Andrés Bonifacio's 1896 Philippine Revolution. Nacionalista Senator Lorenzo Tañada gave the closing speech at the KM's first national congress and was both a consultant and honorary member.

When Sison re-established the Communist Party of the Philippines (CPP) in 1968 as a consequence of the First Great Rectification Movement, the New People's Army (NPA) was organized as its military wing; Kabataang Makabayan then became the CPP's youth arm. It was also one of the groups that established the National Democratic Front of the Philippines.

=== First Quarter Storm ===
Kabataang Makabayan was at the forefront of the First Quarter Storm, a period of civic unrest consisting of violent demonstrations, protests, and marches against the government of then-President Ferdinand Marcos from January to March 1970. The protests and subsequent violence they inspired collectively became one major factor that led to Marcos’ declaration of Martial Law in late September 1972.

Philippine government estimates place Kabataang Makabayan membership at 10,000–30,000 during its peak.

== Campaigns ==
On 27th of November 2025 more than 60 members held a protest at UP Diliman, just days before their 61st founding anniversary. They demanded the overthrow of the bureaucrat-capitalist system upheld by the Marcos and Duterte administrations. The protest was led by Kabataang Makabayan chapters KM-Andres Bonifacio and KM-Antonio Zumel. The protest was also joined by other National Democratic Front of the Philippines (NDFP) allied organizations such as Artista at Manunulat ng Sambayanan (Armas, or People’s Artists and Writers), Katipunan ng mga Gurong Makabayan (Kaguma, or Alliance of Patriotic Educators) and Liga ng Agham para sa Bayan (LAB, or League of People’s Scientists).

Next month on 5th of December the group staged a protest along Sampaloc, Manila. Members called for the ouster of President Marcos and Vice-president Duterte and emphasized the necessity of overthrowing bureaucrat capitalism through people's war.

== See also ==
- National Democratic Front of the Philippines
- Diliman Commune
- Malayang Pagkakaisa ng Kabataang Pilipino
- Malayang Kilusan ng Bagong Kababaihan
- Student Movement Philippines (1965–1972)
