= National Democratic Front of the Philippines =

Revolutionary left-wing coalition in the Philippines

- Pambansang Demokratikong Prente ng Pilipinas
- Founders: Jose Maria Sison; Fidel Agcaoili; Luis Jalandoni
- Leader: Julieta De Lima-Sison
- Dates active: 24 April 1973 – present
- Newspaper: Liberation
- Active regions: Philippines
- Ideology: National democracy Communism; Marxism–Leninism–Maoism
- Political position: Far-left
- Website: www.ndfp.org

The National Democratic Front of the Philippines (NDFP; Filipino: Pambansang Demokratikong Prente ng Pilipinas, PDPP) is a coalition of revolutionary social and economic justice organizations, agricultural unions, trade unions, indigenous rights groups, leftist political parties, and other related groups in the Philippines. It belongs to the much broader National Democracy Movement and the communist rebellion in the Philippines.

The Government of the Philippines, through the Anti-Terrorism Council, declared the group a terrorist organization in 2021.

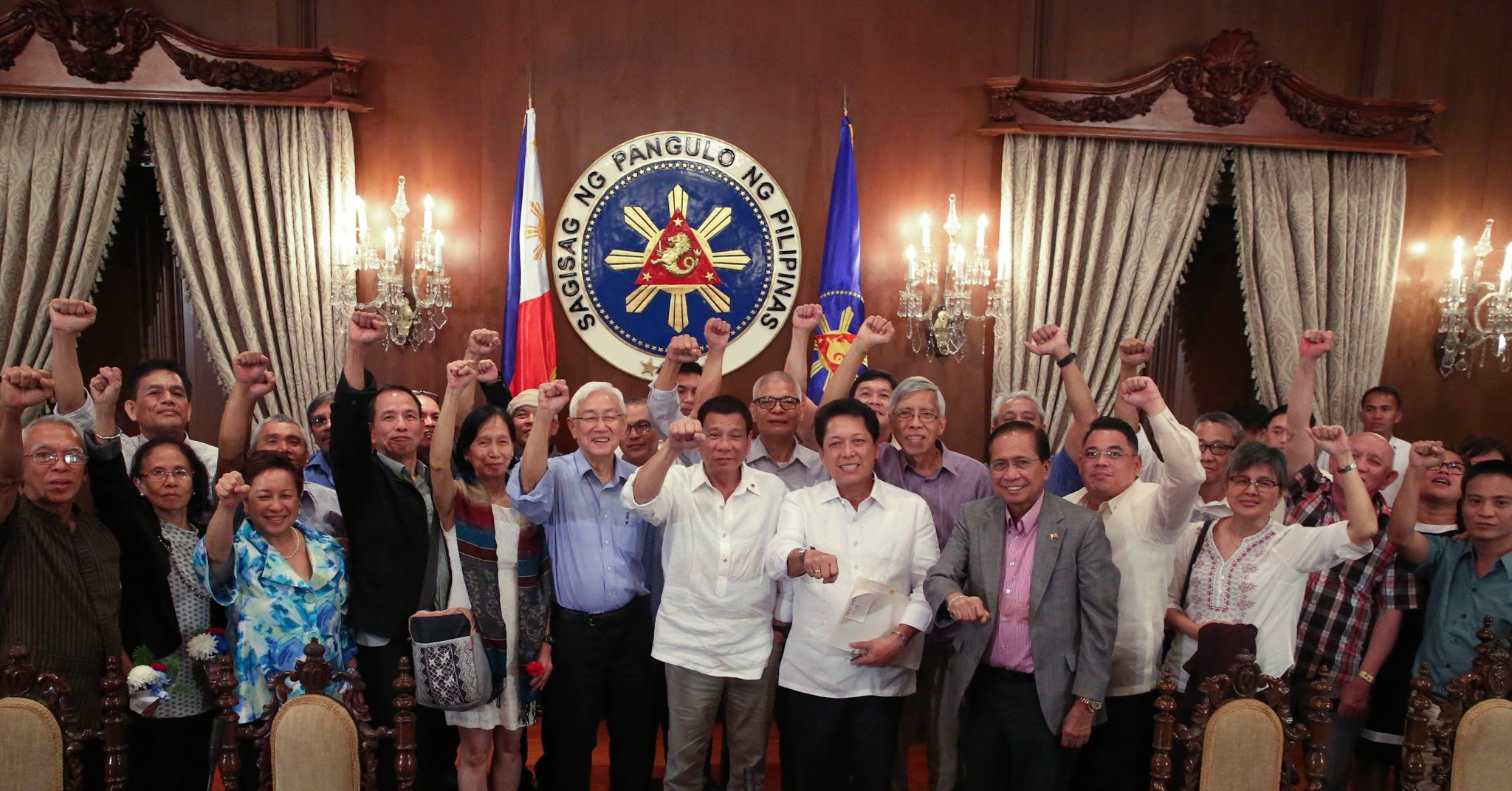
NDFP peace panels, 2016

== History ==
Prior to the creation of the NDF, many of its affiliated organizations had already existed, including the Kabataang Makabayan and the Malayang Kilusan ng Bagong Kababaihan. In 1971, the Preparatory Commission for the National Democratic Front was formed, under the initiative of the Communist Party of the Philippines, in order to bring together all the various revolutionary organizations that had been forced underground by martial law under Ferdinand Marcos.

The Preparatory Commission published a Ten Point Program on April 24, 1973, marking the founding of the NDF as a "revolutionary united front organization of the Filipino people fighting for national freedom and for the democratic rights of the people." Since its founding, the NDF has served as the political wing of the CPP, building diplomatic relations abroad and representing it in peace negotiations. Its primary work is expanding political work in the cities through workers' strikes, student boycotts and protests, and aiding the revolution in the countryside.

In the 1980s, elements of the CPP attempted to liquidate the NDFP and establish an organization called the Bagong Katipunan (New Katipunan) instead. Unlike the NDFP, the proposed Bagong Katipunan would be a federation of which the CPP was in equal standing to other revolutionary mass organizations. This motion was eventually defeated as part of the Second Great Rectification Movement.

The NDF has continued its work among the various sectors of Filipino society, often protesting various laws and development programs that it deems as aggravating the "basic problems of the masses" including CARP, Philippines 2000, Visiting Forces Agreement and counter-insurgency programs.

== Objectives ==
The NDFP adopted the following 12-point program to bring about "national liberation and democracy [that] seeks to provide a broad basis of unity for all social classes, sectors, groups and individual Filipinos here and abroad desirous of genuine national freedom and democracy, lasting peace and a progressive Philippines.":

1. Unite the people for the overthrow of the semi-colonial and semi-feudal system through a people's war and for the completion of the national democratic revolution.
2. Establish a people's democratic republic and a democratic coalition government.
3. Build the people's revolutionary army and the people's defense system.
4. Uphold and promote the people's democratic rights.
5. Terminate all unequal relations with the United States and other foreign entities.
6. Implement genuine agrarian reform, promote agricultural cooperation, raise rural production and employment through the modernization of agriculture and rural industrialization and ensure agricultural sustainability.
7. Break the combined dominance of the U.S. and other imperialists, big compradors and landlords over the economy. Carry out national industrialization and build an independent and self-reliant economy.
8. Adopt a comprehensive and progressive social policy.
9. Promote a national, scientific and pro-people culture.
10. Uphold the rights to self-determination and democracy of the Moro people, Cordillera peoples and other national minorities or indigenous peoples.
11. Advance the revolutionary emancipation of women in all spheres.
12. Adopt an active, independent and peaceful foreign policy.

== Member organizations ==
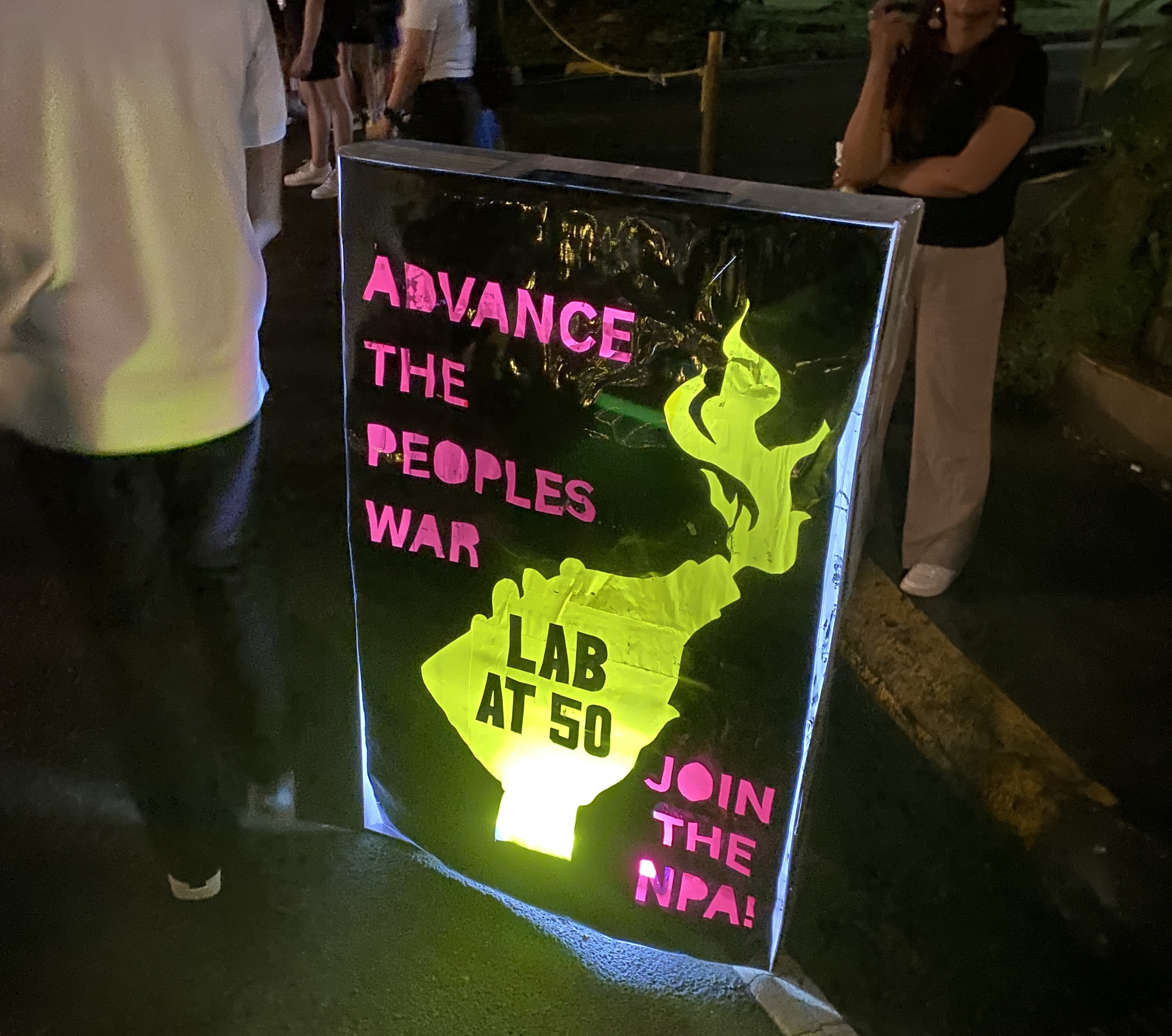

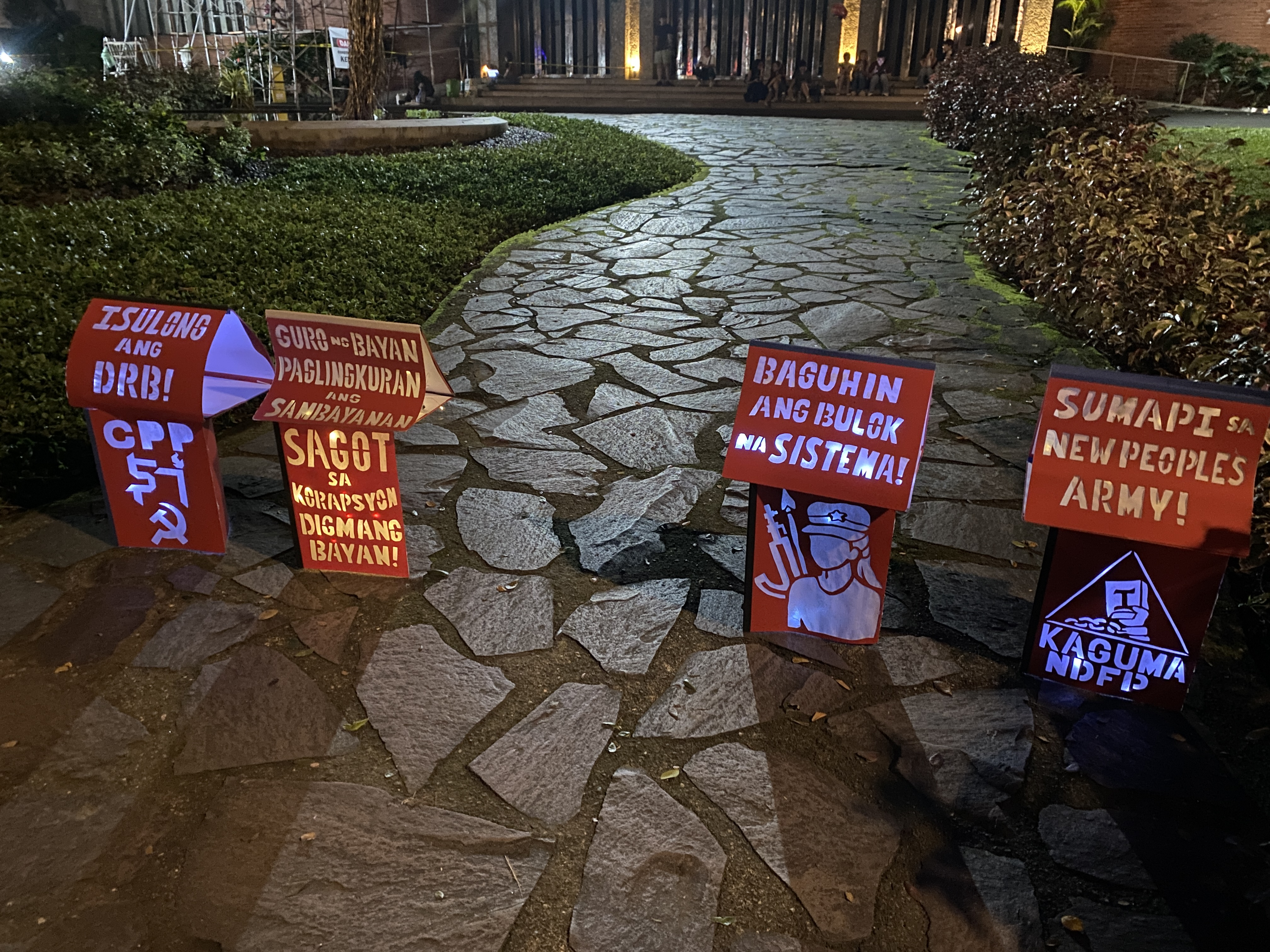
Revolutionary-themed lanterns of NDFP-affiliated organizations at the UP Lantern Parade in 2025.

Members of the front include:

- Communist Party of the Philippines (CPP)
- New People's Army (NPA)
- Moro Resistance and Liberation Organization (MRLO)
- Kabataang Makabayan (KM)
- Revolutionary Council of Trade Unions (RCTU)
- Pambansang Katipunan ng Magbubukid (PKM)
- Makabayang Kilusan ng Bagong Kababaihan (MAKIBAKA)
- Christians for National Liberation (CNL)
- Katipunan ng Gurong Makabayan (KAGUMA)
- Makabayang Samahang Pangkalusugan (MASAPA)
- Liga ng Agham para sa Bayan (LAB)
- Lupon ng Manananggol para sa Bayan (LUMABAN)
- Artista at Manunulat para sa Sambayanan (ARMAS)
- Makabayang Kawaning Pilipino (MKP)
- Revolutionary Organization of Overseas Filipinos and their Families (COMPATRIOTS)
- Cordillera People's Democratic Front (CPDF)
- Revolutionary Organization of Lumads (ROL)
- Katipunan ng mga Samahang Manggagawa (KASAMA)
- Pambansang Samahan ng Makabayang Tsuper (PSMT)

== See also ==
- Government of the Republic of the Philippines - National Democratic Front peace negotiations
