= Luis Jalandoni =

Filipino priest and political activist (1935–2025)

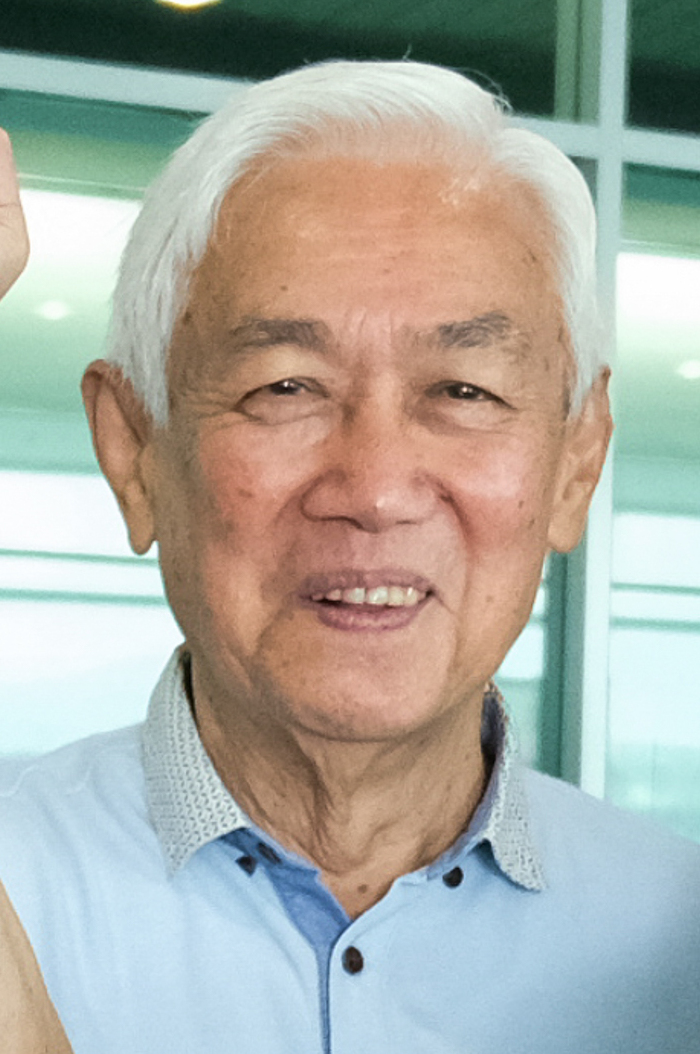
- Jalandoni in 2016
- Born: February 26, 1935; Negros, Philippine Islands
- Died: June 7, 2025 (aged 90); Utrecht, Netherlands
- Citizenship: Philippines; Netherlands (from 1976)
- Occupations: Activist; priest
- Organization: National Democratic Front of the Philippines (chairman)
- Spouse: Coni Ledesma (m. 1974)

Luis Gamboa Jalandoni (February 26, 1935 – June 7, 2025) was a Filipino and Dutch political activist. He was the chairman of the National Democratic Front of the Philippines (NDFP). Previously a Catholic priest, he established the Christians for National Liberation in the 1970s.

== Early life and career ==
Jalandoni was born on February 26, 1935. He hailed from a wealthy family in Silay, Negros Occidental. He was ordained a Roman Catholic priest in Negros. He donated farmlands he inherited from his family in the 1960s to landless workers.

In 1972, Jalandoni was involved in the establishment of Christians for National Liberation. The NDFP credits Jalandoni with his role of involving Catholic and Protestant followers in the Communist movement. He was arrested by the authorities in the following year with nun Coni Ledesma. They were released in mid-1974.

In 1975, Jalandoni and Edgar Jopson were among those who coordinated with workers who were preparing to hold the La Tondeña workers' strike to demand the regularization of 600 contractual or casual workers.

He went into exile in the Netherlands in 1976. He then became a close aide of the Filipino Communist leader Jose Maria Sison.

From 1989 to 2016, Jalandoni served as the chief peace negotiator for the Communist rebels in negotiations with the Philippine national government.

The Anti-Terrorism Council during the tenure of president Rodrigo Duterte in mid-2022 designated Jalandoni as a terrorist. The International League of Peoples' Struggle has advocated for the removal of said designation.

== Personal life and death ==
Jalandoni was married to Maria Consuelo "Coni" Ledesma, a former nun and school principal. Jalandoni was released from the priesthood in 1974 and Ledesma received her dispensation in December 1972. The two formally got married on December 19, 1974, in Mandaluyong, with the rite presided by then newly instated cardinal Jaime Sin.

Jalandoni was a naturalized citizen of the Netherlands, where he lived until his death.

Jalandoni died in Utrecht on June 7, 2025, at the age of 90.
