= Student Christian Movement of the Philippines =

- Chairperson: Kej Andres
- Founded: December 27, 1960
- Membership: KKKP; NCCP (associate)
- Ideology: National democracy Christian politics Ecumenism; Progressivism
- Colours
- Mother party: Kabataan
- National affiliation: Bayan; Makabayan
- International affiliation: WSCF; ILPS
- Newspaper: Breakthrough

The Student Christian Movement of the Philippines (SCMP) is an ecumenical Progressive Christian national democratic mass organization in the Philippines. It aims to uphold students rights and participates in numerous local and worldwide peoples' advocacies. As with other SCMs around the world, SCMP is a member of the World Student Christian Federation. In the Philippines, it is an associate member of the National Council of Churches in the Philippines (NCCP) and Kalipunan ng Kristiyanong Kabataan sa Pilipinas (KKKP). It is also a member and a founding organization of Kabataan Partylist.

== Orientation ==
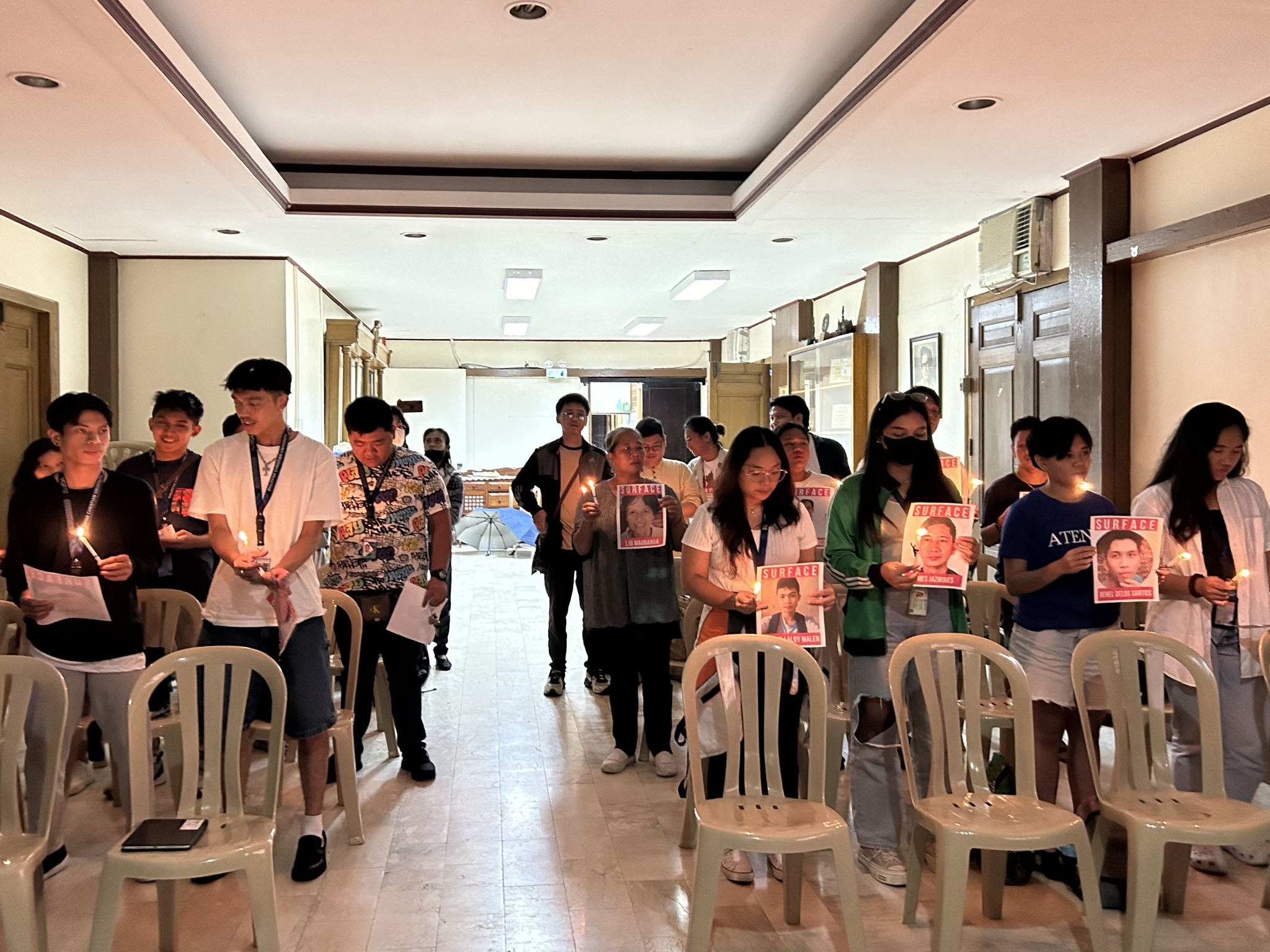
Candle-lighting and worship against human rights violations in the Philippines and calling for the surfacing of desaparecidos.

SCMP is a national-democratic ecumenical mass organization of Christian students in the Philippines. As Christians, SCMP believes that faith alone cannot solve structural problems in the Philippines, and poverty and injustice must also be solved through action, programs, and a national-democratic alternative. Economically, the group believes in establishing genuine agrarian reform and national industrialization, in order to free the Philippines from poverty. It also build links with other Filipinos of other sectors and faiths, as well as through international solidarity.

The group also support the causes towards human rights and LGBT liberation.

SCMP has also participated in climate activism in the Philippines. The group joined the Rise for Climate Justice – Global Climate Strike, a protest in reaction to COP 27. The group called for change in the “consumerist, profit-driven, wasteful, and warmongering system" that is the root of climate disasters. "While companies continue to rake profits and imperialist militaries continue to wage senseless wars, the subsequent effect of climate change and environmental plunder has been catastrophic especially for vulnerable communities," the group added.

== History ==
=== Origins ===
SCMP was founded on December 27, 1960 in a National Assembly attended by 57 delegates representing 52 units from across the country. The push to establish SCMP was part of the worldwide youth ecumenical movement going back to the formation of the Student Christian Movement of Great Britain in 1899.

The organization was also known in its Tagalog name Kilusang Kristiyano ng Kabataang Pilipino (KKKP) during the '70s.

=== Marcos dictatorship ===
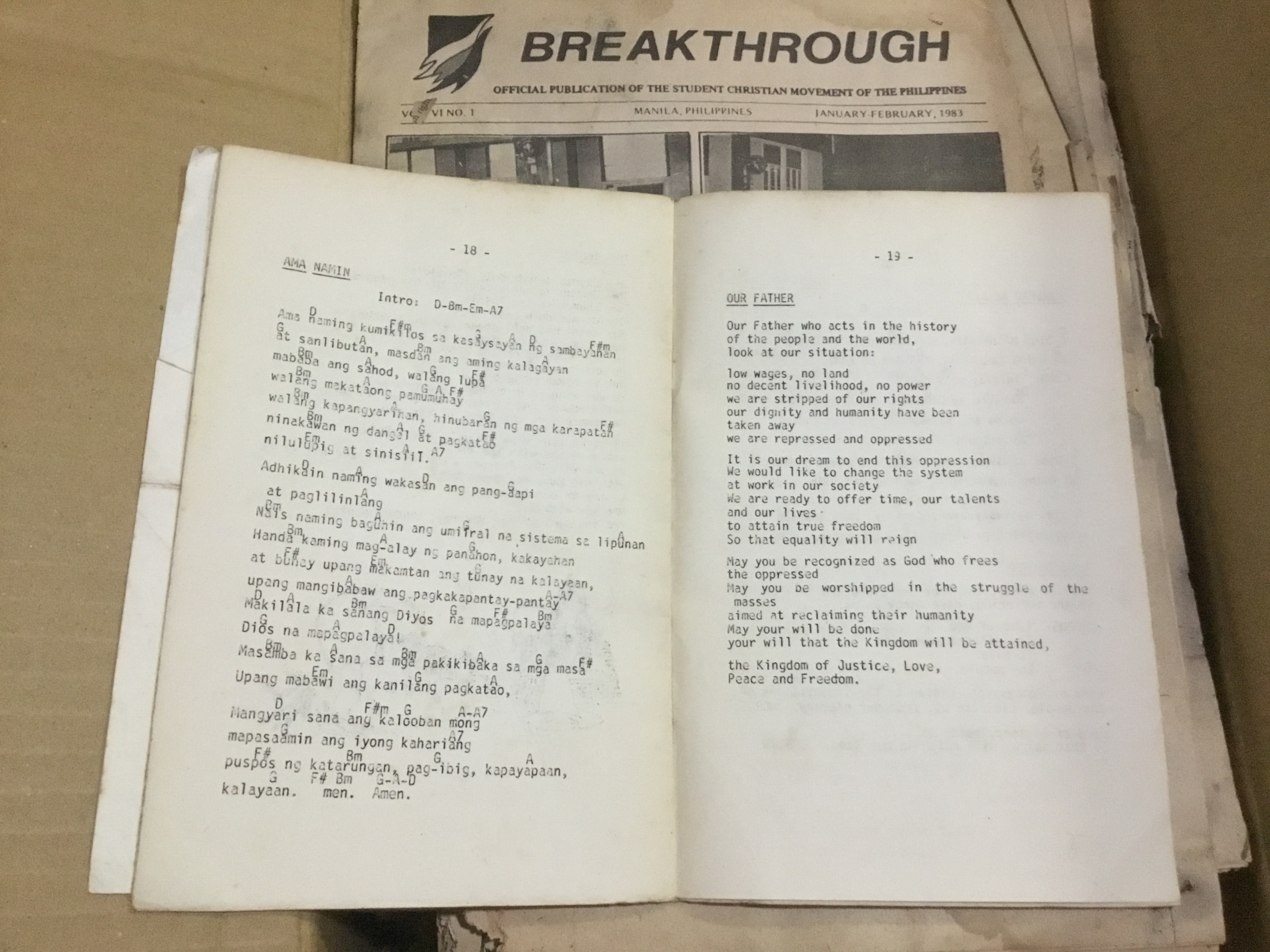
A copy of Breakthrough, SCMP official publication, and a booklet from 1983.

The group participated in the student movement in the Philippines during the 1960s and 1970s. During this time, it was one of the groups that the Kabataang Makabayan sought help for the latter's expansion. It was during 1971 in which the organization released a statement integrating liberation theology with local Maoism, to pursue the struggle against US imperialism and local feudalism and capitalism. It was influential among radical Christians, together with Luis Jalandoni and Ed de la Torre.

SCMP organizing was affected by the declaration of Martial Law by then-dictator Ferdinand Marcos when various groups were declared illegal. However, it is one of the first groups that openly dared to organize during this time, and the Movement was formally re-established on January 20–22, 1978 in a National Assembly at UP Los Baños. It expanded its work outside Metro Manila and strengthened its work on international solidarity and basic masses integration.

Prominent SCMP leaders during this time were victims of human rights abuses during the Martial Law period. Carlos Tayag was a student from UP Diliman and was instrumental in organizing the Christians for National Liberation (CNL) and Kalipunan ng Kristiyanong Kabataan sa Pilipinas (KKKP), but became a desaparecido on August 17, 1976, suspected to be abducted by military agents. Jessica Sales from UP Los Baños was one of the founders of the UPLB university chapter and she also became a desaparecido on July 31, 1977. Neri Colmenares from Negros and also an officer of the Student Catholic Action of the Philippines (SCAP) was arrested in 1983 and became one the youngest political prisoners during the Marcos dictatorship. Methodist Romeo Crismo did education work for SCMP, became a desaparecido on August 12, 1980.

SCMP became one of the Christian organizations that took participation at the First EDSA People Power.

=== Post-EDSA ===
The group persevered in organizing and strengthening links among other sectors when the Mendiola Massacre happened under then-president Corazon Aquino.

SCMP was also part of the Second People Power Uprising. During the early administration of President Gloria Macapagal Arroyo, a youth initiative called Youth Movement for Justice and Meaningful Change, composed of Anakbayan (AB), the League of Filipino Students, the College Editors' Guild of the Philippines, the National Union of Students of the Philippines, and the Student Christian Movement of the Philippines met in the office of Anakbayan in Padre Noval, Sampaloc, Manila, to discuss plans to advance the interests of the Filipino youth. Talks were made due to the disillusionment brought by the new administration. Eventually, these talks culminated in the formation of Anak ng Bayan Youth Party on June 19, 2001, coinciding with the birthday of José Rizal.

Since 2000, SCMP has remained active in the student movement in the University of the Philippines, as well as in other schools and provinces in the Philippines.

During Pope Francis's visit to the Philippines in 2015, the group held a youth camp and other activities to celebrate the arrival of the Pontiff. Additionally, SCMP urged Pope Francis to make 'surprise visits' to urban poor communities in Metro Manila and in the "tent city" of typhoon Yolanda survivors in order to be more familiar with the concrete conditions of the marginalized in the country. The group, meanwhile, denounced the handling of Benigno Aquino III of the disaster, saying that he was like Pontius Pilate, in his 'washing of hands' on the deaths due to the typhoon.

In 2016, SCMP and WSCF released a statement condemning the killings of Lumads in Mindanao, holding accountable the government under Benigno Aquino III. Various groups asserted that the role of the church as sanctuaries of the oppressed must be respected.

=== Duterte administration ===
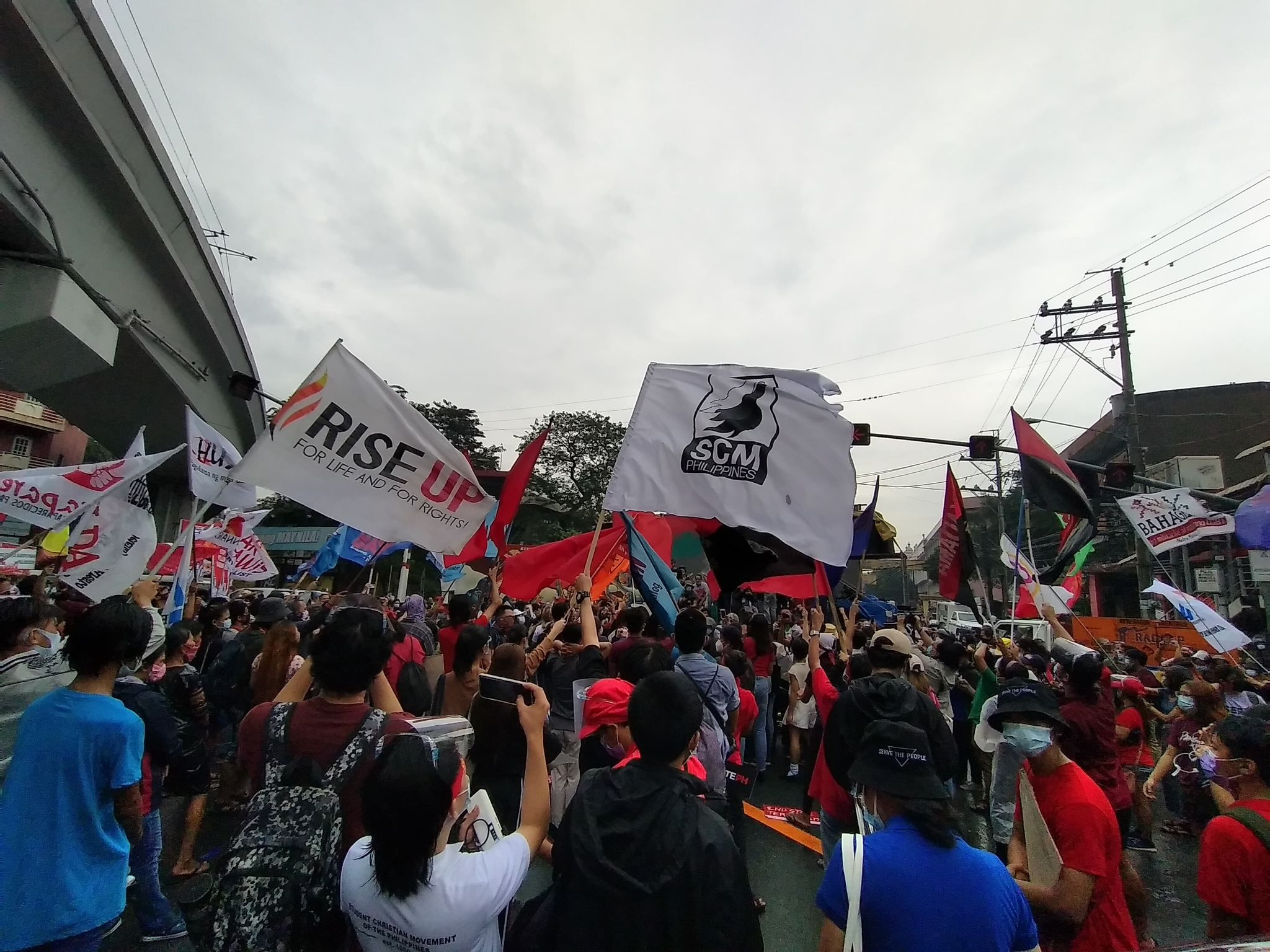
SCMP during the International Human Rights Day protest in Manila, December 10, 2020.

During the Duterte administration, SCMP became one of the youth and Christian groups that has been critical of the government. Along with other faith-based organizations such as NCCP, Iglesia Filipina Independiente, Promotion of Church People’s Response, Rural Missionaries of the Philippines, and Roman Catholic Church, the youth group also experienced red-tagging and other forms of harassment.

Forwarding a youth agenda for the 2019 Elections, Kenji Muramatsu, former Spokesperson, said that the youth will hold senators accountable even after elections.

On August 13, 2019, the SCMP University of Santo Tomas chapter, together with other local groups, launched a protest outside the university condemning the worsening violence in the country, especially in the wake of Negros peasant killings. Lynus Del Mar, chapter Spokesperson said that "God does not want a country of killings where justice is not recognized".

In 2019, the Armed Forces of the Philippines in Iloilo warned against participating in a mass walkout headed by progressive youth organizations. The West Visayas State University chapter of SCMP denounced the AFP as trampling on freedom of expression, "silencing voices of truth".

Kenji Muramatsu, SCMP spokesperson, asked "What is wrong with helping victims of human rights abuses call for justice for their slain loved ones? After the bloody massacre in Sagay City (Negros Occidental) and the non-stop surveillance and harassment on human rights defenders, now the military wants the people to shut up amid widespread human rights violations committed towards God’s people." Further, he said that the actions of the AFP were "un-Christ-like" and that "the Bible and our churches have taught us to pursue justice and let it flow like a stream. For the military to vilify the people’s pilgrimage towards this mission explicitly goes against the teachings of Christ."

On October that year, the UP Visayas chapter of SCMP denounced the red-tagging of posters scattered at their campus that tagged mass organizations in the said university.

National Chairperson Kej Andres criticized the "failed" online and distance setup of education during the COVID-19 pandemic. He said that the state of education during the pandemic has dealt mental, physical, and emotional woes to Filipino students. The group urged the government to provide educational aid, safe resumption of classes, and accountability of the national government. SCMP also called to abolish the National Task Force to End Local Communist Armed Conflict (NTF-ELCAC), citing red-tagging and other human rights abuses, and redirect its budget towards various aid for the Filipino people suffering under the pandemic, including their advocacy for student aid.

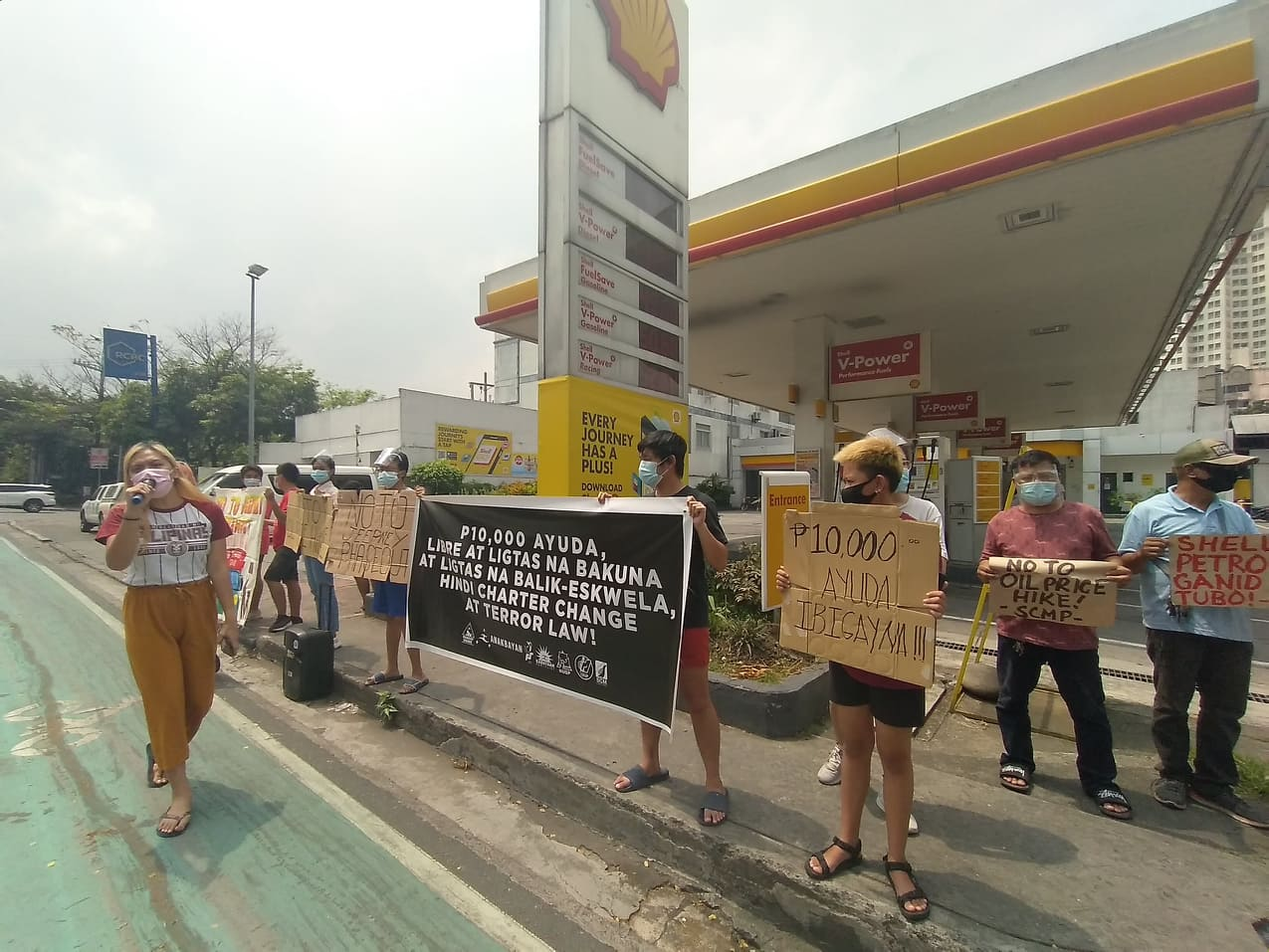
Transport and youth groups, including SCMP, calling for economic aid and calling out against oil price hike and jeepney phaseout amidst COVID-19 pandemic.

SCMP slammed President Duterte on Independence Day 2021 as a "puppet" enforcing neoliberal policies such as economic Charter Change, CREATE Law, and jeepney phaseout.

On September 13, 2021, SCMP, together with other youth groups, lead a protest at Mendiola, condemning Duterte's approach to COVID-19 pandemic. They also said that online distance learning amidst the pandemic received little aid from the national government. They urged the government for safe resumption of classes and the provision of ₱10,000 educational aid for students.

Remembering SCMP senior friend and martial law desaparecido Carlos Tayag, SCMP honored church people killed under Duterte such as Marcelito "Tito" Paez and Mark Ventura, as a statement against oppression under the administrations of Ferdinand Marcos and Rodrigo Duterte.

On Bonifacio Day 2021, the group slammed the candidacy of Bongbong Marcos and Sara Duterte for the 2022 National Elections and denounced the actions and policies of the past Marcos and Duterte administrations as treacherous acts against the Filipino people, similar to treachery against Bonifacio. Relating to the elections, they also praised the extension of voter registration and the assertiveness of citizens online and on-ground.

On November 30, 2021, the group, along with other church leaders encouraged presidentiable Leni Robredo to review her stance regarding NTF-ELCAC and call for its abolishment. With the start of the campaign season for the 2022 National Elections, SCMP is one with the Makabayan Bloc in endorsing Robredo for presidency.

In April 2022, the organization blasted the statement of Leyte 4th District Representative Lucy Torres-Gomez in saying that the presidency of Marcos, Jr. is destiny and 'act of God'. National Chairperson Andres said, "Does she even know what she's talking about? An 'act of God' usually means an extraordinary disaster. Rep. Torres-Gomez is cheap, offensive, and desperate in invoking God for the Marcoses. She uses God's name in vain because God stood only with the oppressed and downtrodden, the victims of the Marcos dictatorship."

=== Marcos, Jr. administration ===
Even before the installation of the new administration, the Movement has been a critic of Bongbong Marcos, also highlighting the role SCMP played during the anti-dictatorship struggle. After the announcement that he will be the Agriculture Secretary, SCMP said that Marcos is just trying to appease the biggest sector of the country and challenges him towards genuine land reform, subsidy for farmers, and end of militarization in the countryside.

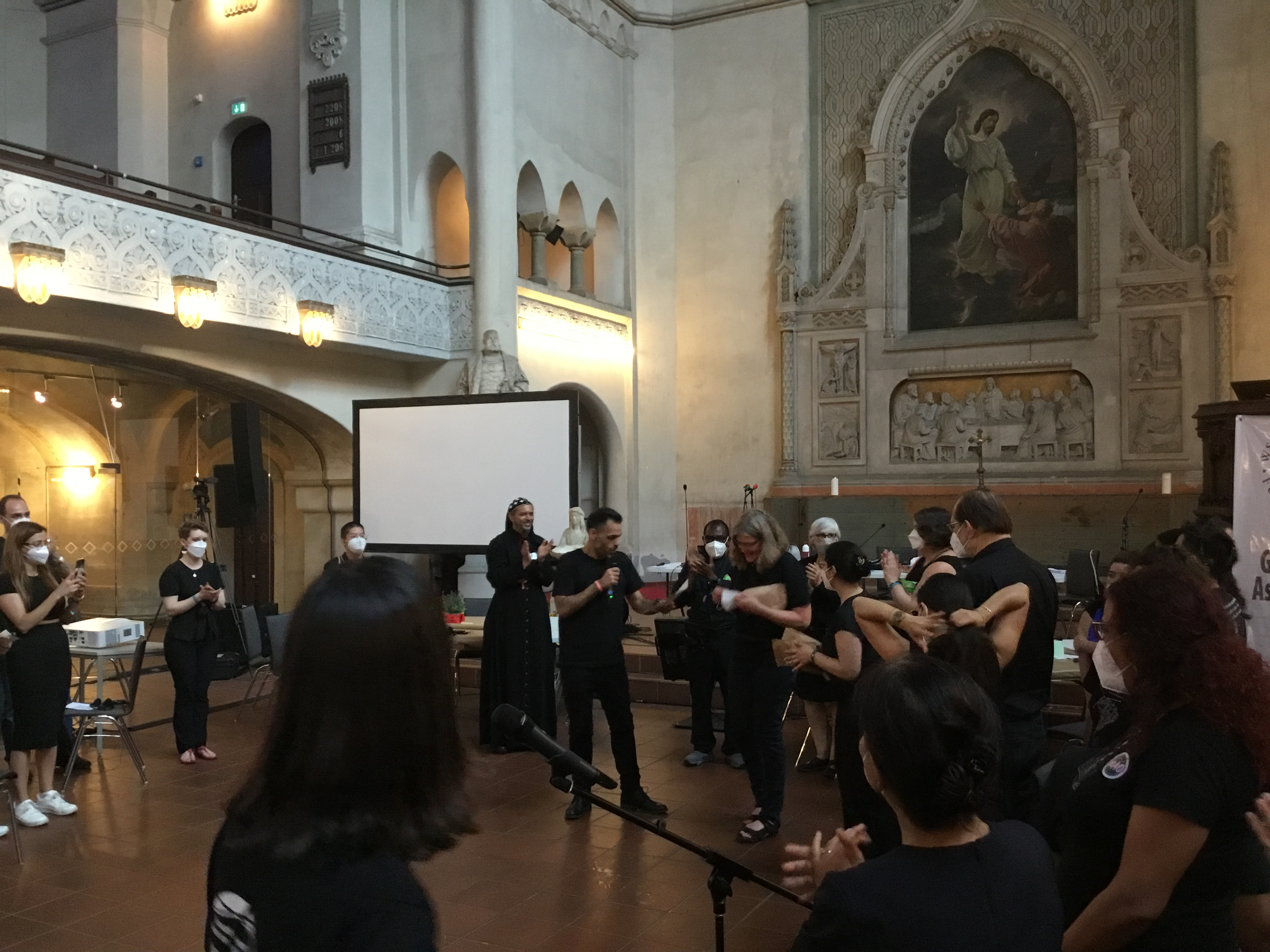
SCMP participated in the 37th General Assembly of the World Student Christian Federation in Berlin, Germany.

On June 30, date of Marcos, Jr.'s inauguration, SCMP successfully forwarded a resolution to the 37th WSCF General Assembly in Berlin, Germany, entitled "Denounce Rodrigo Duterte for His Crimes Against Humanity and Resist the Newly-Installed Marcos-Duterte Regime".

SCMP criticized the government for said unpreparedness for the physical resumption of classes in 2022, stating that great burden has been passed onto students and teachers. They advocated for higher budget, more health personnel, more health facilities, better testing and treatment facilities, and other facilities to ensure safe resumption of classes. They also denounced Marcos, Jr. for prioritizing the reinstitution of mandatory Reserve Officers' Training Corps (ROTC) among colleges in the Philippines as was said in his 2022 State of the Nation Address (SONA), saying that it will teach students blind obedience and make them vulnerable to abuses. The organization also expressed its stance against mandatory ROTC by stating cases of past abuses, injuries, and deaths related to the program.

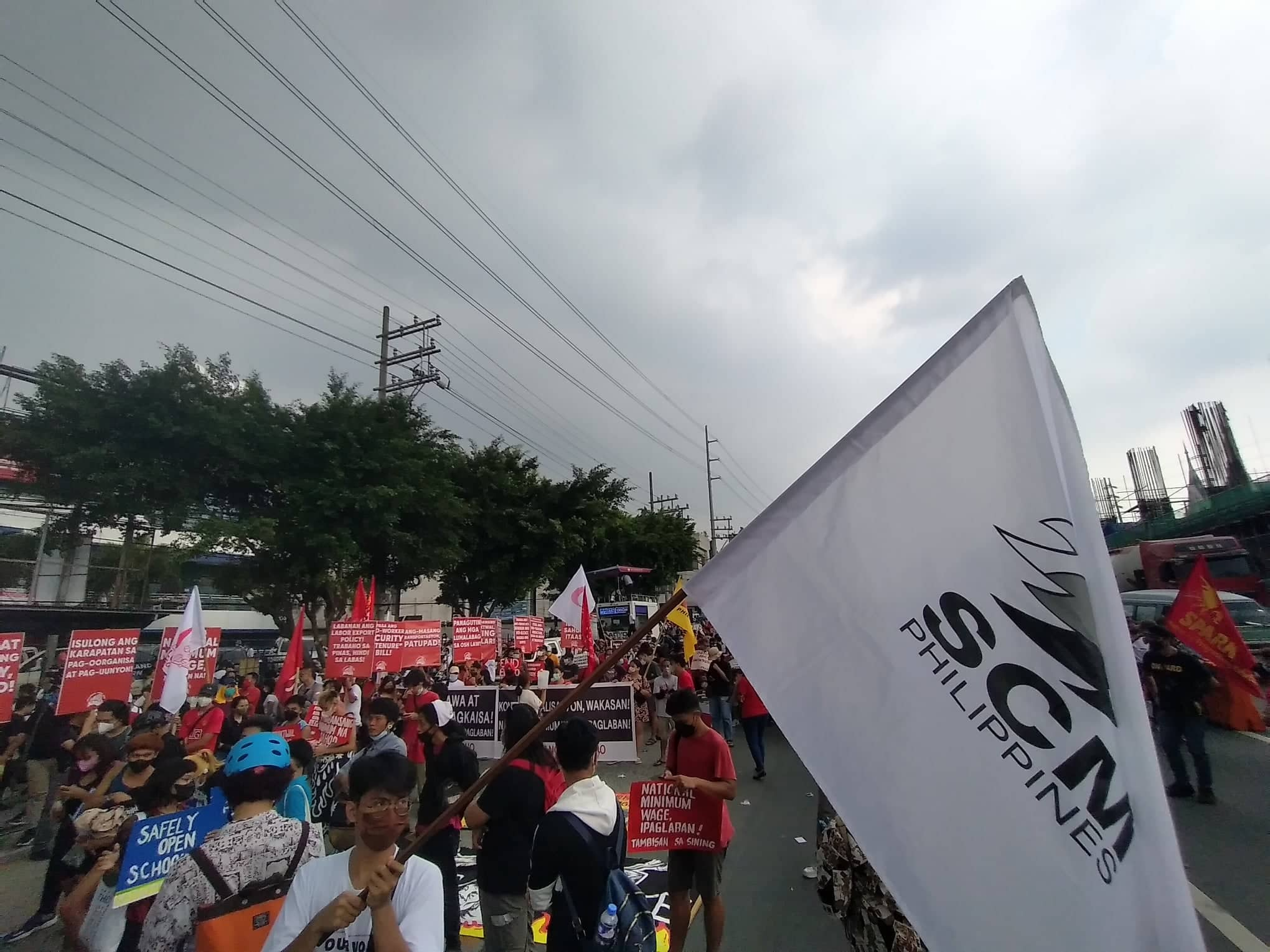
SCMP at the SONA 2022 protest.

On human rights, the group criticized the president for his refusal to make the Philippines rejoin the ICC. They said, "Marcos is a coward for not having the conviction to hold former President [Rodrigo] Duterte accountable for the bloody and useless war on drugs and counter-insurgency policies”. Citing red-tagging and harassment, the group said that there is no 'breath of fresh air' as human rights abuses continue to 'bleed' into the current administration of Marcos, Jr. They also hit Department of Justice Secretary Jesus Crispin Remulla for charges against the Rural Missionaries of the Philippines, saying that DOJ and Remulla act as 'Pilate's court'. The group issued a reminder that it was Remulla who baselessly red-tagged the attendees of the rally of former Presidential candidate and Vice President Leni Robredo as sent and trained by the National Democratic Front.

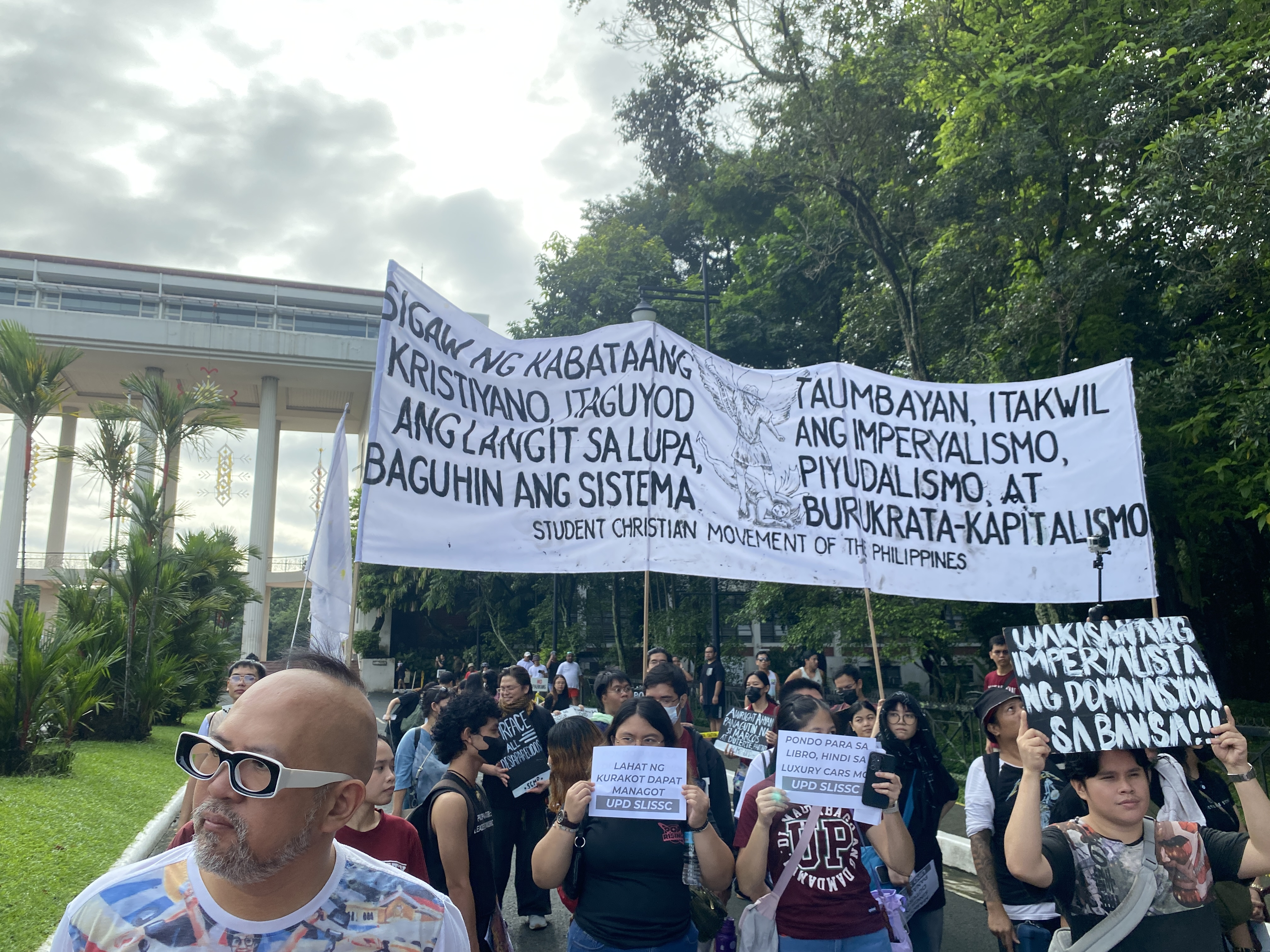
SCMP anti-corruption banner that went to the Baha sa Luneta protest, September 21, 2025.

The Movement joined the mobilization in front of Supreme Court on August 10, 2022, supporting loved ones and colleagues of activists as they urged the issuance of writ of amparo. The activists, Loi Magbanua, Ador Juat, Elgene Mungcal, and Cha Pampoza, have been believed to be abducted by government forces and being held in a military camp. The group expressed its prayers for the immediate safe resurfacing of the missing activists.

On September 5, 2022, the Movement joined in a fellowship hosted by the United Church of Christ in the Philippines hoping for the safe repatriation of Mary Jane Veloso. In a statement, the group said, "Any inaction and unwillingness to bring back Mary Jane Veloso home safely would reflect how this administration is set to treat the more than two million OFWs abroad."

== Activities ==
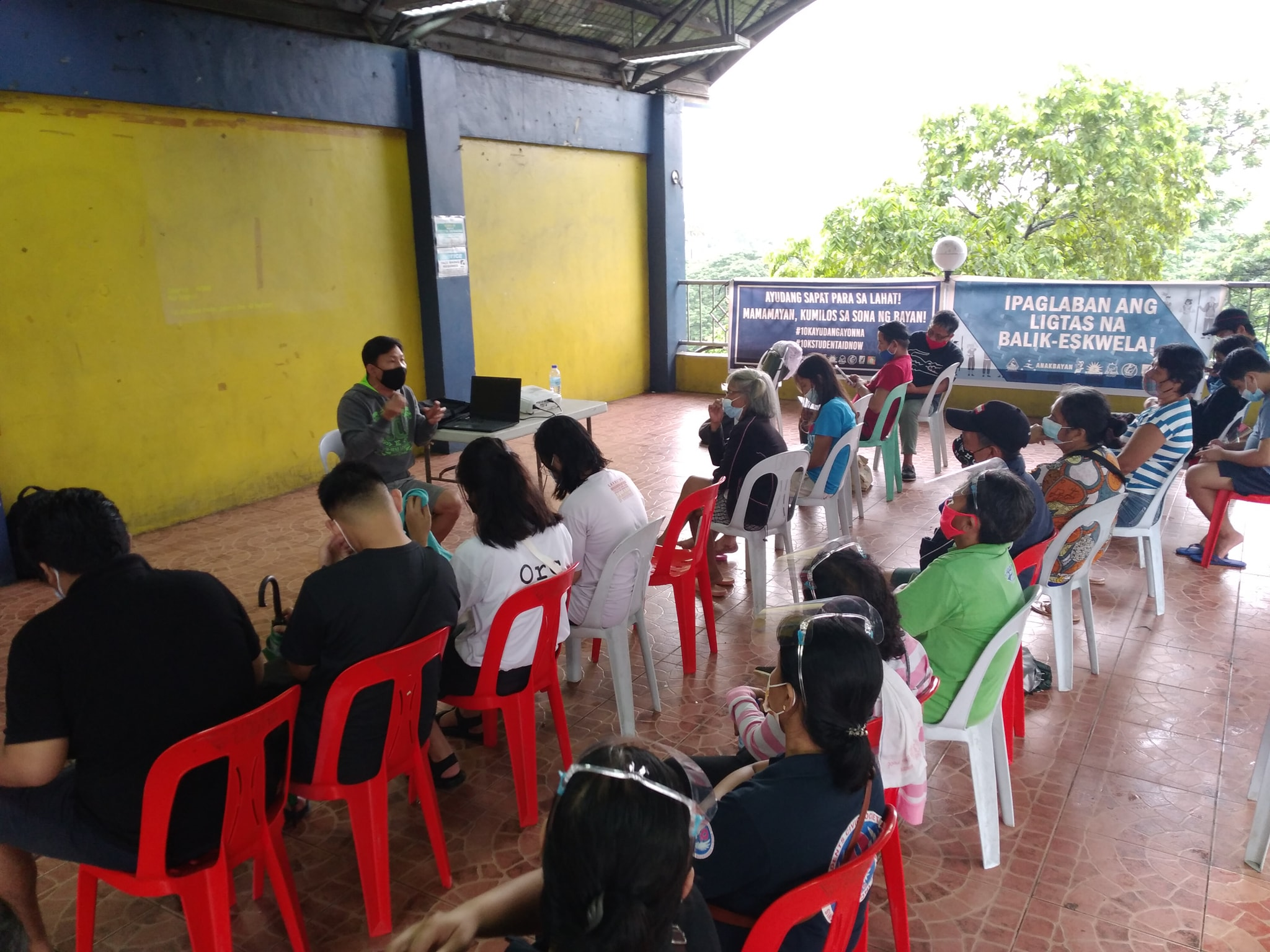
Dialogue with community representatives from Quezon City, 2021.

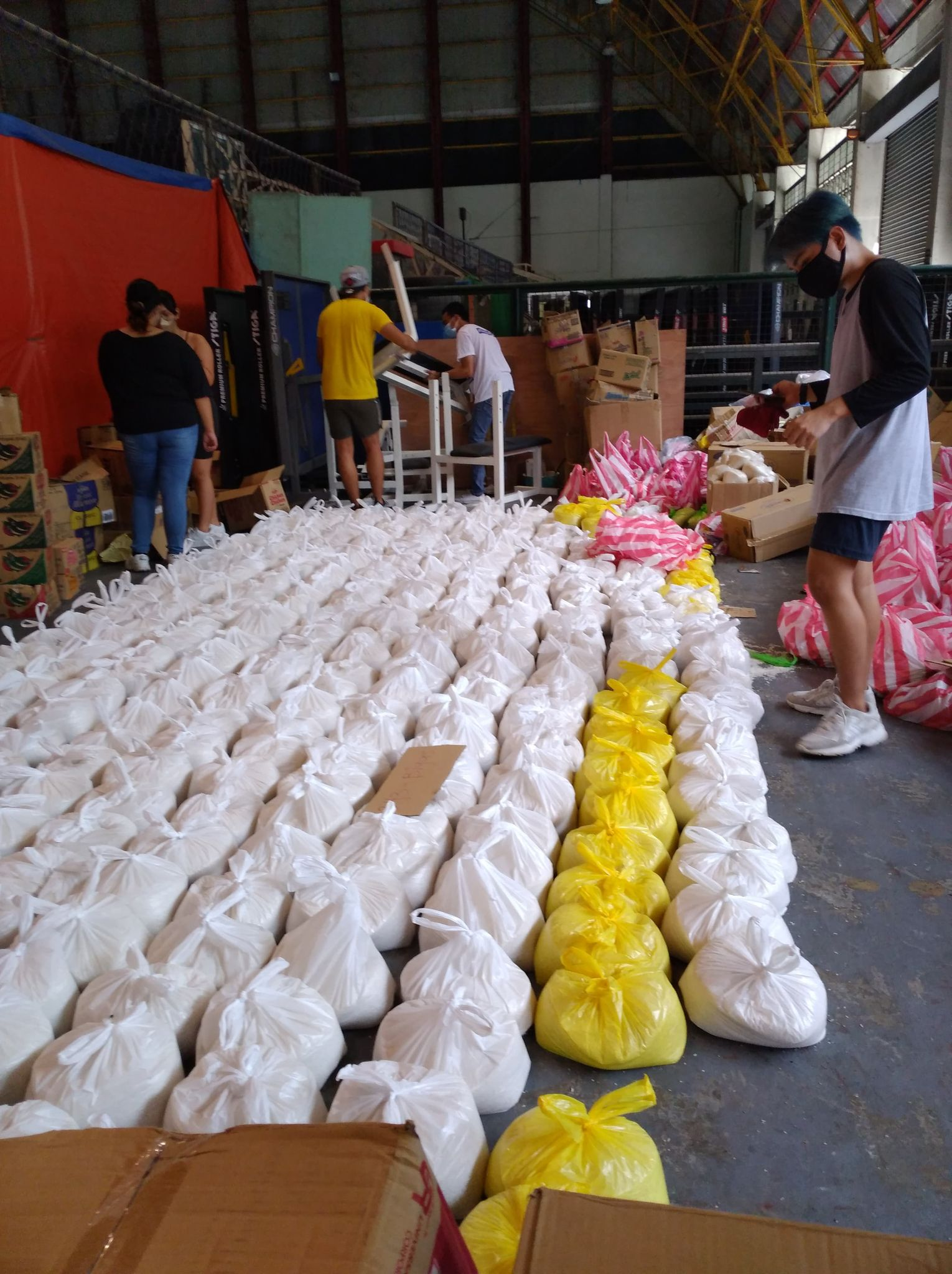
Relief work by national democratic organizations, December 2020.

SCMP participates in ecumenical liturgical fellowships and other forms of worship, Bible studies, integration among peasant and workers communities, protest mobilizations, worship dialogues, relief operations, and international solidarity work. The organization is also active in peace-building activities, advocating for the resumption of peace talks between the Government of the Republic of the Philippines and the National Democratic Front of the Philippines (GRP-NDFP peace talks).

The organization shifted many of its undertakings to online activities during the COVID-19 lockdown. The organization has launched and participated in webinars including voter education, discussions on social events, social media rallies, press conferences, worship services, and many more.

SCMP has an official national newsletter, Breakthrough. Chapters also have newsletters.

== Structure ==
SCM Philippines is a grassroots organization composed of chapters found among schools, cities, provinces, and regions across the country. The Philippine-wide formation is the national office. Kej Andres is the incumbent National Chairperson.

== Affiliations ==
The Student Christian Movement of the Philippines is affiliated with the following federation and associations:

- World Student Christian Federation
- Kalipunan ng Kristiyanong Kabataan sa Pilipinas
- Bagong Alyansang Makabayan
- Karapatan Alliance Philippines
- National Council of Churches in the Philippines, associate member
- Kabataan Partylist, associate member, founding organization
- GABRIELA
- International Migrants Alliance
- International League of Peoples' Struggle

== Alumni relations ==
As with other SCMs around the world, alumni are called "senior friends." The Movement maintains close relationship with its senior friends.

Notable senior friends include:

- Neri Colmenares, martial law activist and former congressman from Bayan Muna. He was the International Solidarity Work officer of the national office of SCMP during his youth.
- Raoul V. Victorino, retired Sandiganbayan Associate Justice and Corporate Secretary of Philippine Bible Society
- Carlos Tayag, Benedictine monk, martial law activist, and desaparecido
- Jessica Sales, martial law activist, part of the Southern Tagalog 10
- Romeo Crismo, Methodist, martial law activist, and desaparecido
- Fidel Nemenzo, University of the Philippines Diliman Chancellor
- Clarissa Balan, Executive Secretary for Advocacy and Programmes at World Alliance of YMCAs, former General Secretary of the World Student Christian Federation
- Necta Montes, former General Secretary of the World Student Christian Federation (2015-2021)
- Lidy Nacpil, environmental activist and wife of Lean Alejandro
- Amanda Echanis, former political prisoner, writer, peasant activist, and student leader

== See also ==
- World Student Christian Federation
- Australian Student Christian Movement
- Student Christian Movement of Canada
- Indonesian Christian Student Movement
- Student Christian Movement of Great Britain
