= Bagong Alyansang Makabayan =

Left-wing alliance of Philippine organizations

- President: Renato Reyes
- Chairman: Teddy Casiño
- Secretary-General: Raymond Palatino
- Founder: Lorenzo M. Tañada; Lean Alejandro
- Founded: May 1, 1985; 41 years ago
- Headquarters: Quezon City
- Ideology: National democracy Indigenism; Anti-imperialism; Anti-Americanism
- Political position: Far-left
- International affiliation: International League of Peoples' Struggle
- Colors: Red
- Senate: 0 / 24
- House of Representatives: 0 / 316
- Provincial governors: 0 / 80
- Provincial vice governors: 0 / 80
- Provincial board members: 0 / 1,023

Website
- bagongalyansangmakabayan.org

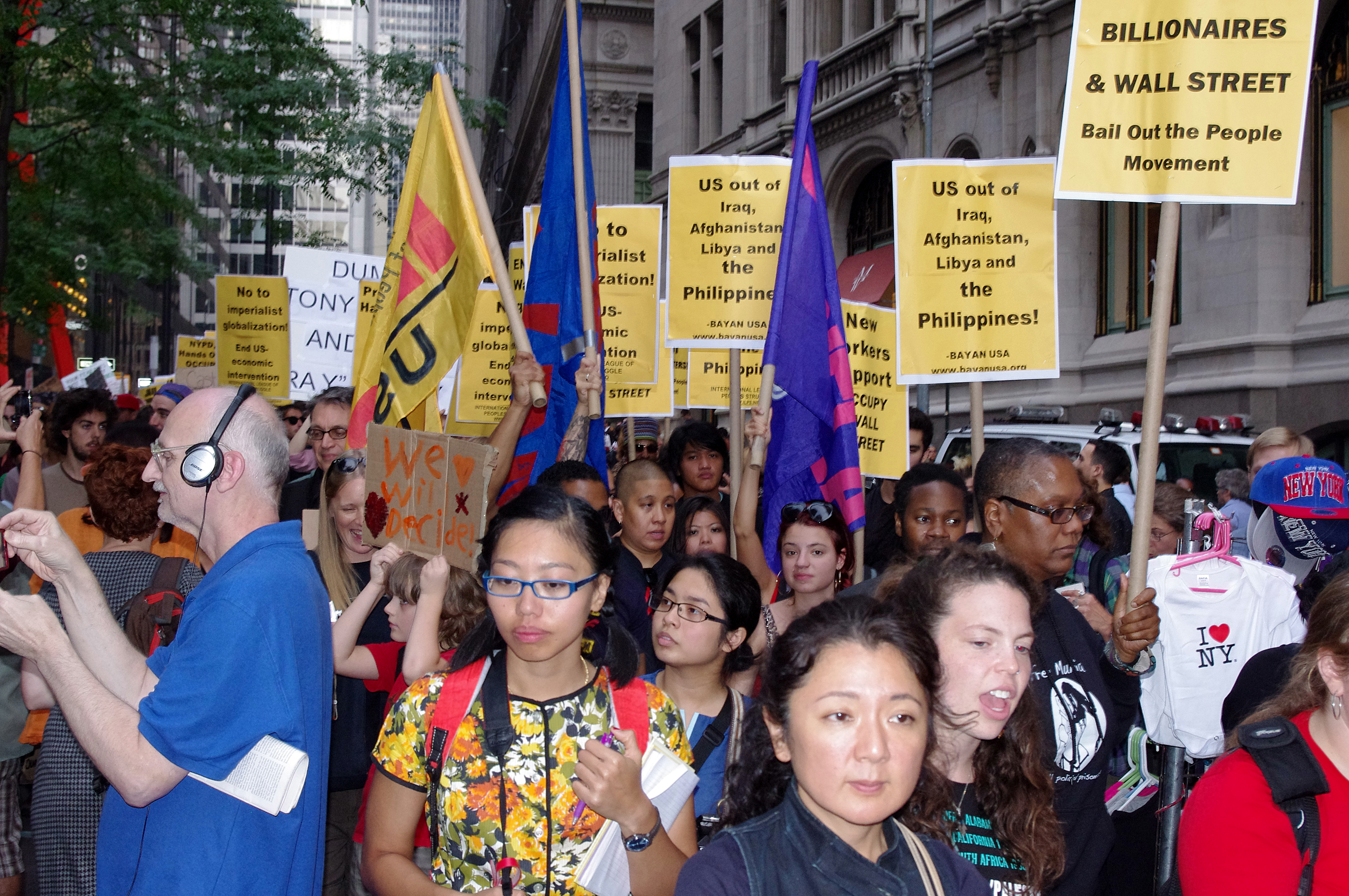
Members of Bayan USA march in New York in solidarity with Occupy Wall Street

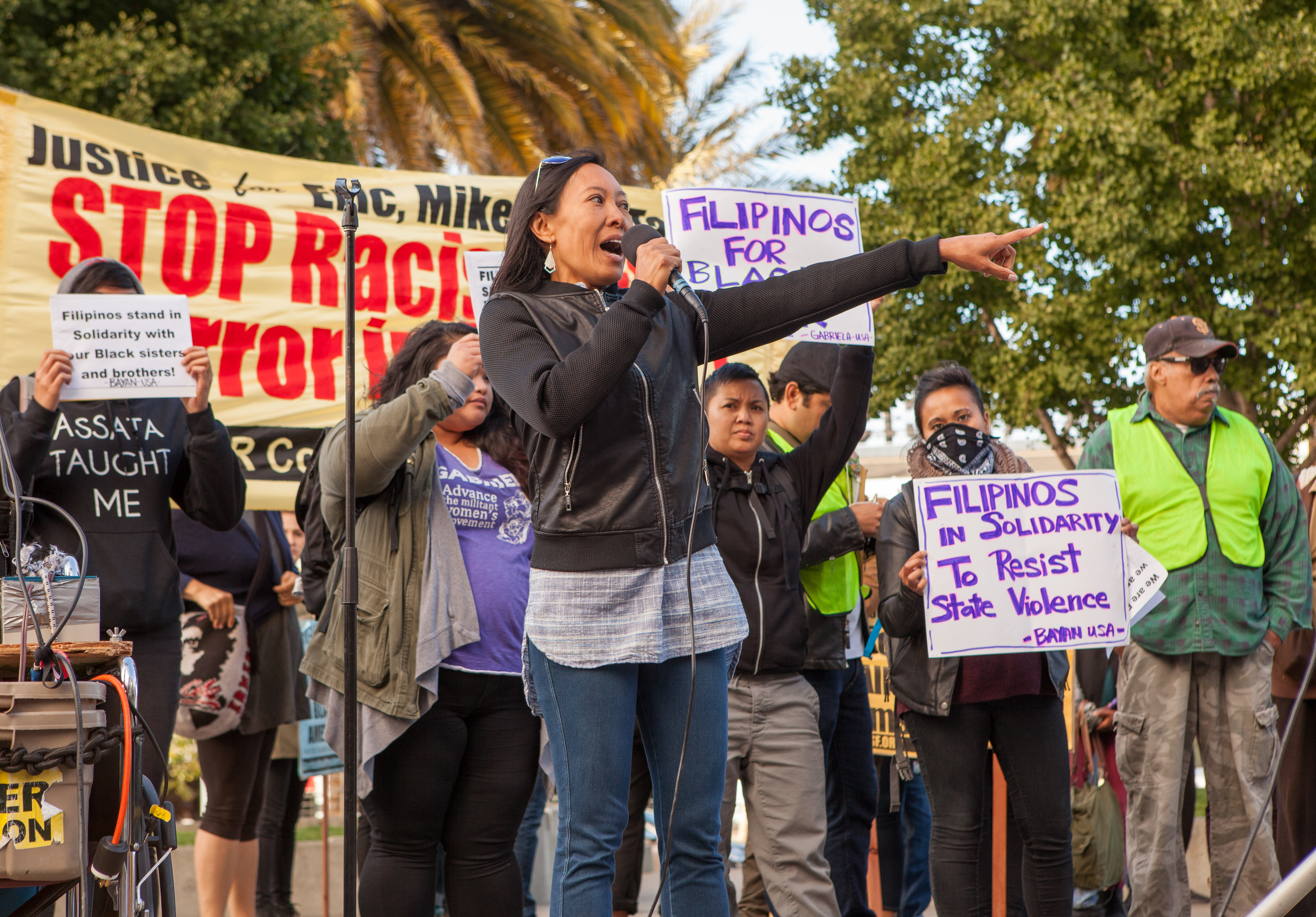
Members of Bayan USA and GABRIELA USA protest against police violence in San Francisco

The Bagong Alyansang Makabayan (lit. 'New Patriotic Alliance') or Bayan (lit. 'Nation') is a political campaign alliance of various far-left sectoral organizations in the Philippines that adhere to National Democratic principles. It was founded on International Workers' Day, May 1, 1985 as part of the opposition during the Marcos dictatorship.

== Politics ==
=== Ideology ===
The principle of Bayan is National Democracy. It believes that:

- The Philippines is rich in natural resources but, the Filipino people are deprived of those resources;
- The history of the Philippines is the history of class struggle;
- Imperialism, Feudalism and Bureaucratic Capitalism are the roots of poverty; and
- A National-Democratic Revolution is the solution to ending the roots of poverty

However, unlike underground revolutionary organizations such as the Communist Party of the Philippines; its armed wing, the New People's Army and its united front, the National Democratic Front, members of Bayan do not take up arms. They participate in the urban mass movement through mass mobilizations.

=== Political structure ===
Bayan operates as an alliance of different sectoral organizations. It follows a democratic and central structure. Its own documentation suggests that it is a centralized organization, including:

- chapters as the smallest units
- the general assembly as the highest policymaking body
- the national council, which meets twice a year or more often if needed
- the national executive committee to implement the policies of the general assembly and national council
- five specialized commissions
- the general secretariat that runs day-to-day operations
- a national office in Quezon City in Metro Manila.

As an umbrella group of the National-Democratic Movement in the Philippines, BAYAN is associated with several organizations:

- Peasants: Kilusang Magbubukid ng Pilipinas (Peasant Movement in the Philippines, KMP), AMIHAN (National Federation of Peasant Women: Defend Peasant Women Portraits Series), UMA (Unyon ng mga Manggagawa sa Agrikultura, Union of Agricultural Workers)
- Workers: Kilusang Mayo Uno (May First Movement, KMU)
- Youth and Students: Anakbayan, Kabataan Partylist, College Editors Guild of the Philippines (CEGP), League of Filipino Students (LFS), National Union of Students of the Philippines (NUSP), Karatula – Kabataang Artista para sa Tunay na Kalayaan (Youth Artists for Genuine Freedom), SCMP – Student Christian Movement of the Philippines,
- Women and LGBTQ+ Rights: GABRIELA Women's Party (General Assembly Binding Women for Reform, Integrity, Equality, Leadership & Action), GABRIELA Alliance of Women, Bahaghari Philippines (Bahaghari),
- Culture Works and Arts: Panday Sining, Tambisan sa Sining, Sining Lila
- Fisherfolk: Pambasang Lakas ng Kilusang Mamamalakaya Pilipinas (National Force of Fisherfolk Movement in the Philippines, PAMALAKAYA)
- Religious: Promotion of Church People's Response (PCPR), Rural Missionaries of the Philippines (RMP)
- Health Workers: Health Alliance for Democracy (HEAD)
- Scientists: Advocates of Science and Technology for the People (Agham)
- Teachers: Congress of Teachers and Educators for Nationalism and Democracy (CONTEND) Alliance of Concerned Teachers (ACT-Teachers)
- Cultural Workers: Concerned Artists of the Philippines (CAP), Sinagbayan, Tambisan sa Sining, Sining Lila
- Indigenous People: Katribu, Kalipunan ng mga Katutubong Mamamayan ng Pilipinas (KAMP)
- Human Rights Defenders: KARAPATAN – Alliance for the Advancement of People's Rights
- Lawyers: National Union of People's Lawyers (NUPL)
- Semiproletariat: Kalipunan ng Damayang Mahihirap (KADAMAY), Pagkakaisa ng mga Samahan ng Tsuper at Opereytor Nationwide (PISTON)

== History ==
=== Broad anti-dictatorship formation; Post-EDSA Revolution struggle (1985–1987) ===
Bayan was founded by Leandro "Lean" Alejandro, a leader of the League of Filipino Students, and former senator Lorenzo Tañada on May 1, 1985, during the Marcos dictatorship. It brought together more than a thousand grassroots and progressive organizations, representing over a million people, and was largely national democratic. From May 4 to 5, Bayan held its first congress at the Ateneo de Manila University in Quezon City, with former senators Tañada and Jose W. Diokno elected as its first chairman and president respectively. Two weeks after the first congress, however, newly elected National Council members Butz Aquino and Teofisto Guingona Jr. left the group, while Diokno would also resign as president some months later, with the three being reportedly uneasy about the growing influence of the Communist Party of the Philippines (CPP) and its National Democratic Front (NDF) in the alliance.

In early 1986, Bayan called for a boycott of the snap presidential election, reasoning that it was merely being used by president Ferdinand Marcos' administration to perpetuate its power over the country. As a result of its boycott, however, the group grew politically isolated, and although it was involved in the People Power Revolution against the Marcos dictatorship in the weeks after the election, Bayan admitted in its second congress that the boycott muted its chance to "meaningfully participate in the February uprising". Etta Rosales, then in charge of the Popular Struggle Commission of Bayan, noted that the group was "disoriented" by the large turnout in the uprising due to its hesitance to support military officials such as Fidel V. Ramos and Juan Ponce Enrile. This coincided with the isolation that also occurred to the CPP during the revolution. Nonetheless, the new political environment after the revolution enabled the creation of the now defunct Partido ng Bayan (People's Party) that participated in the 1987 elections.

On September 19, 1987, Alejandro was assassinated by unknown gunmen in front of Bayan headquarters in Quezon City. Numerous members of Congress such as Nikki Coseteng and Edcel Lagman strongly condemned the assassination, with Speaker pro tempore Antonio Cuenco denouncing the attack and asking authorities to immediately solve the crime. Sociology professor Zenaida Uy, chairwoman of Bayan's Cebu chapter, would later be elected to succeed Alejandro as secretary-general in December 1987.

=== Ideological disagreements (1993–1998) ===
During the height of ideological debates within the left in 1993, members of Bayan-NCR split from Bayan-National to form another multisectoral organization, the Sandigan ng Demokrasya at Kalayaan ng Sambayanan (SANLAKAS).

=== Post-EDSA Dos; Bayan Muna (2001–present) ===
Since 2001, Bayan Muna, the political party of the organization, has been the leading party-list member in the House of Representatives of the Philippines.

On August 7, 2002, the secretary-general of Bayan, Teodoro A. Casiño, claimed that under the Gloria Macapagal Arroyo presidency, soldiers murdered at least 13 Bayan and Bayan Muna members.

In a resolution passed during the Bayan 7th Congress in August 2004, the coalition would expand to include overseas Filipino organizations as official members of Bayan. In January 2005, the first Bayan USA assembly was held in San Francisco. As the first overseas Bayan chapter, Bayan USA directly coordinated the implementation of Bayan campaigns with Bayan member organizations in the United States. These organizations include the NY Committee for Human Rights in the Philippines, the League of Filipino Students in San Francisco State University, Anakbayan (New York/New Jersey, Los Angeles, San Diego, Honolulu, East Bay, Portland, and Seattle), the Critical Filipino/Filipina Studies Collective, Habi Ng Kalinangan, babaeSF (San Francisco), Pinay Sa Seattle, and Filipinas for Rights and Empowerment (FiRE).

On February 25, 2006, Bayan Muna Rep. Satur Ocampo managed to evade arrest in Quezon City after leaving a press conference held by minority members of the House of Representatives at the Sulô Hotel in response to President Arroyo's state of emergency declaration. Two days later, police authorities issued an arrest warrant for Ocampo and 50 other left-leaning figures with charges of rebellion.

After the 2007 elections, and the death of Anakpawis representative Crispin Beltran, Bayan had five combined representatives in the 14th Congress of the Philippines: Ocampo and Casiño of Bayan Muna, Rafael V. Mariano of Anakpawis, and Liza Maza and Luzviminda Ilagan of GABRIELA.

In the 2010 elections, Bayan had seven congressmen in the lower house, including Raymond Palatino, Neri Colmenares, and Luzviminda Iligan.

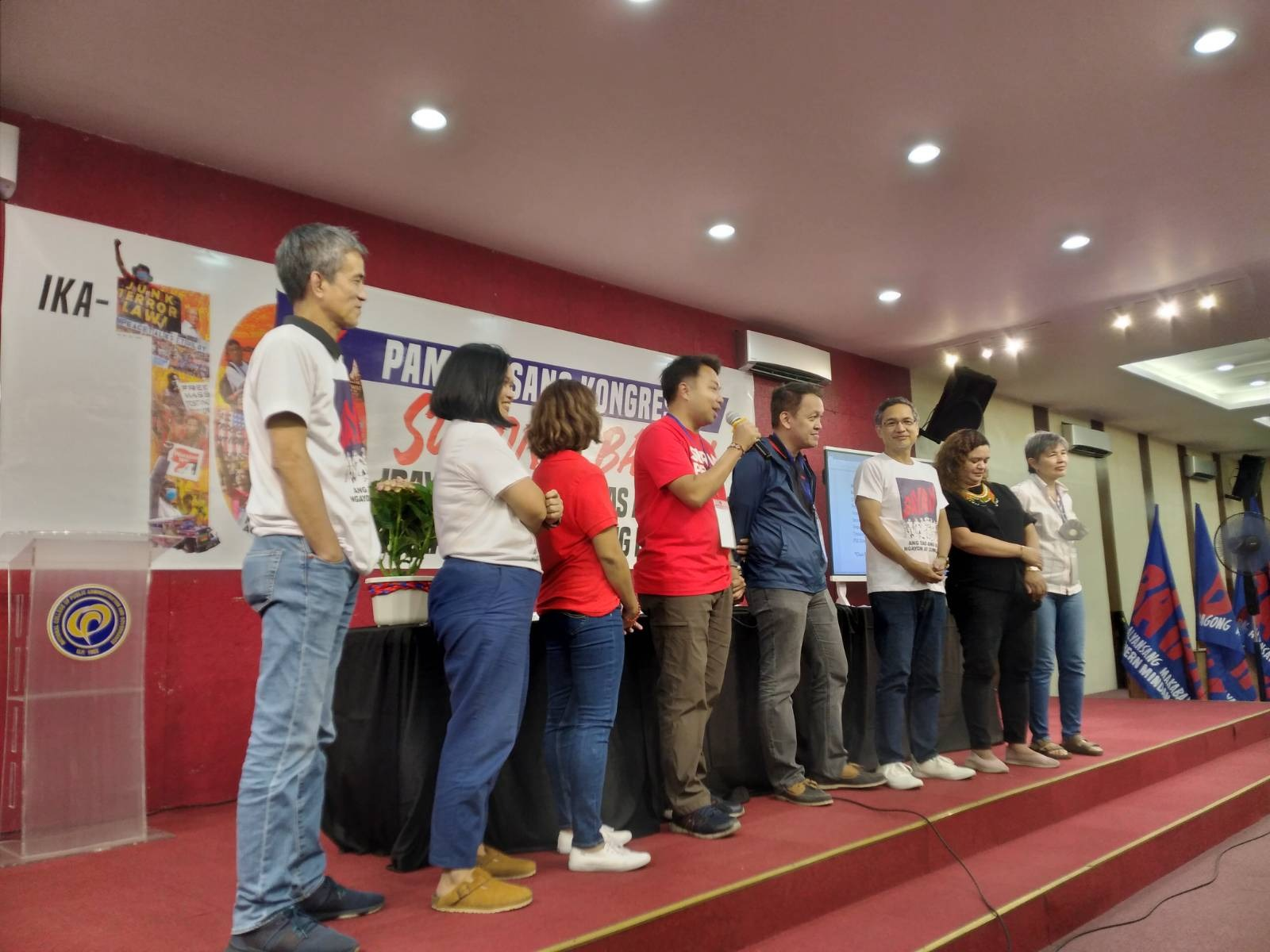
Newly elected officers of Bagong Alyansang Makabayan, 2023.

During the 2013 Philippine Elections, all party lists except for Aking Bikolnon ran for sectoral representatives. Kalikasan and Courage were disqualified, while Kabataan and Piston faced charges of disqualification that were subsequently lifted. Bayan Muna and GABRIELA won two seats each; with Neri Colmenares and Carlos Zarate for Bayan Muna and Luzviminda Ilagan and Emmi de Jesus for Gabriela. Meanwhile, ACT, Anakpawis and Kabataan won 1 seat each; with Antonio Tinio, Fernando "Ka Pando" Hicap and Terry Ridon as their respective representatives.

Makabayan and Bayan also fielded former Bayan Muna representative Teodoro "Teddy" Casiño, who has served for 9 years as one of the congressmen of the said partylist. He placed 22nd out of 35, garnering about 3.5 million votes.

== List of chairpersons, secretary-generals and presidents ==
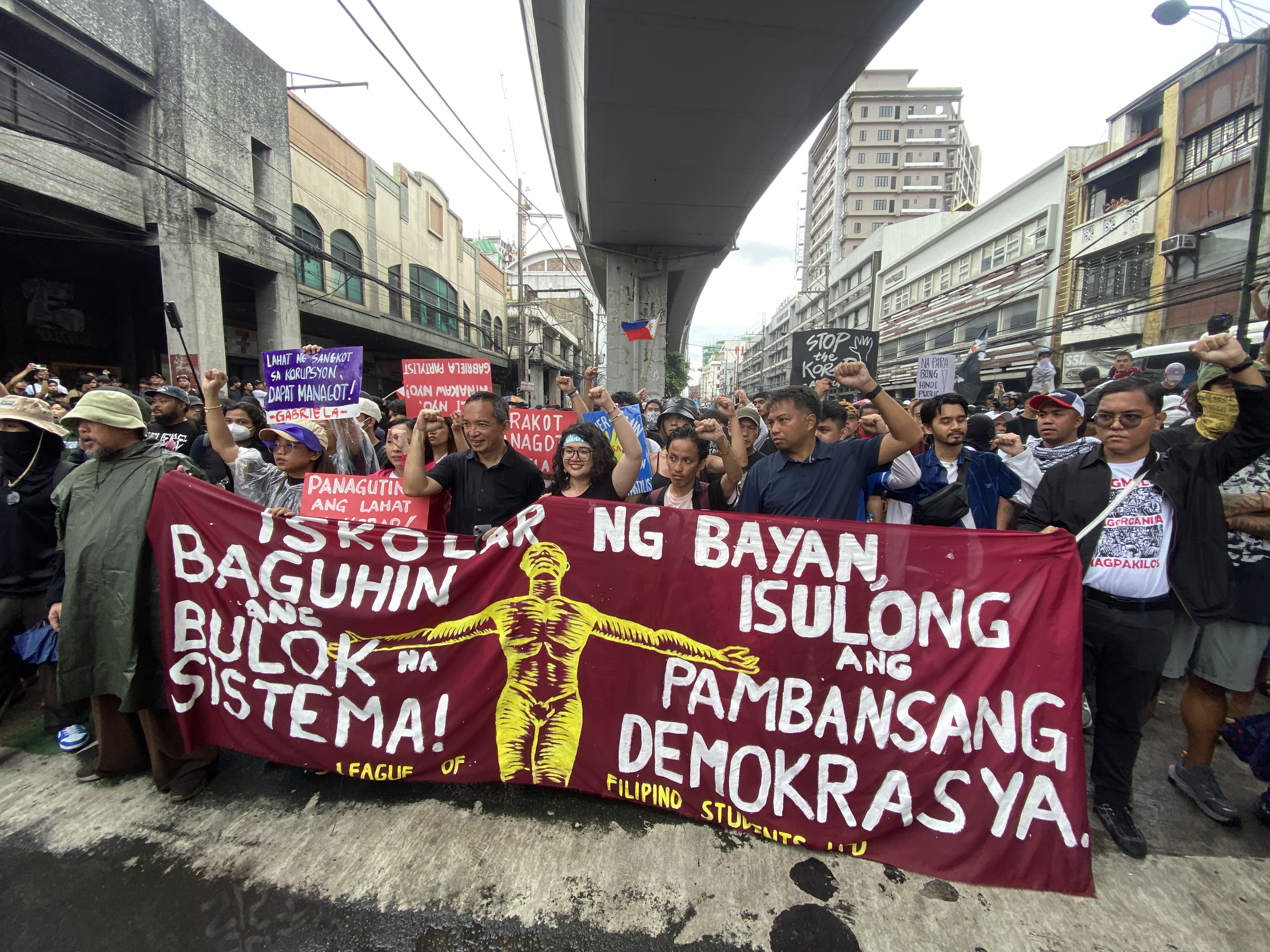
BAYAN and Makabayan leaders near Mendiola during the Baha sa Luneta September 21, 2025 anti-corruption protests.

=== Chairperson ===
- Lorenzo Tañada (1985–1987)
- Nelia Sancho (1990–1993)
- Crispin Beltran (1993–1999)
- Rafael V. Mariano (1999–2004)
- Carol Araullo (2005–2023)
- Teddy Casiño (2023–present)

=== Secretary-general ===
- Leandro Alejandro (1985–1987)
- Zenaida Uy (1987–)
- Lidy Nacpil-Alejandro (now affiliated with Sanlakas)
- Nathanael Santiago
- Teddy Casiño (1999–2004)
- Renato Reyes Jr. (2005–2023)
- Raymond Palatino (2023–present)

=== President ===
- Jose W. Diokno (1985)
- Ambrosio Padilla (1985–1986)
- Renato Reyes Jr. (2023–present)

== See also ==
- Bayan Muna
- National Democracy Movement (Philippines)
