= Carlos Tayag =

Filipino Benedictine deacon and activist

Carlos Tayag O.S.B.
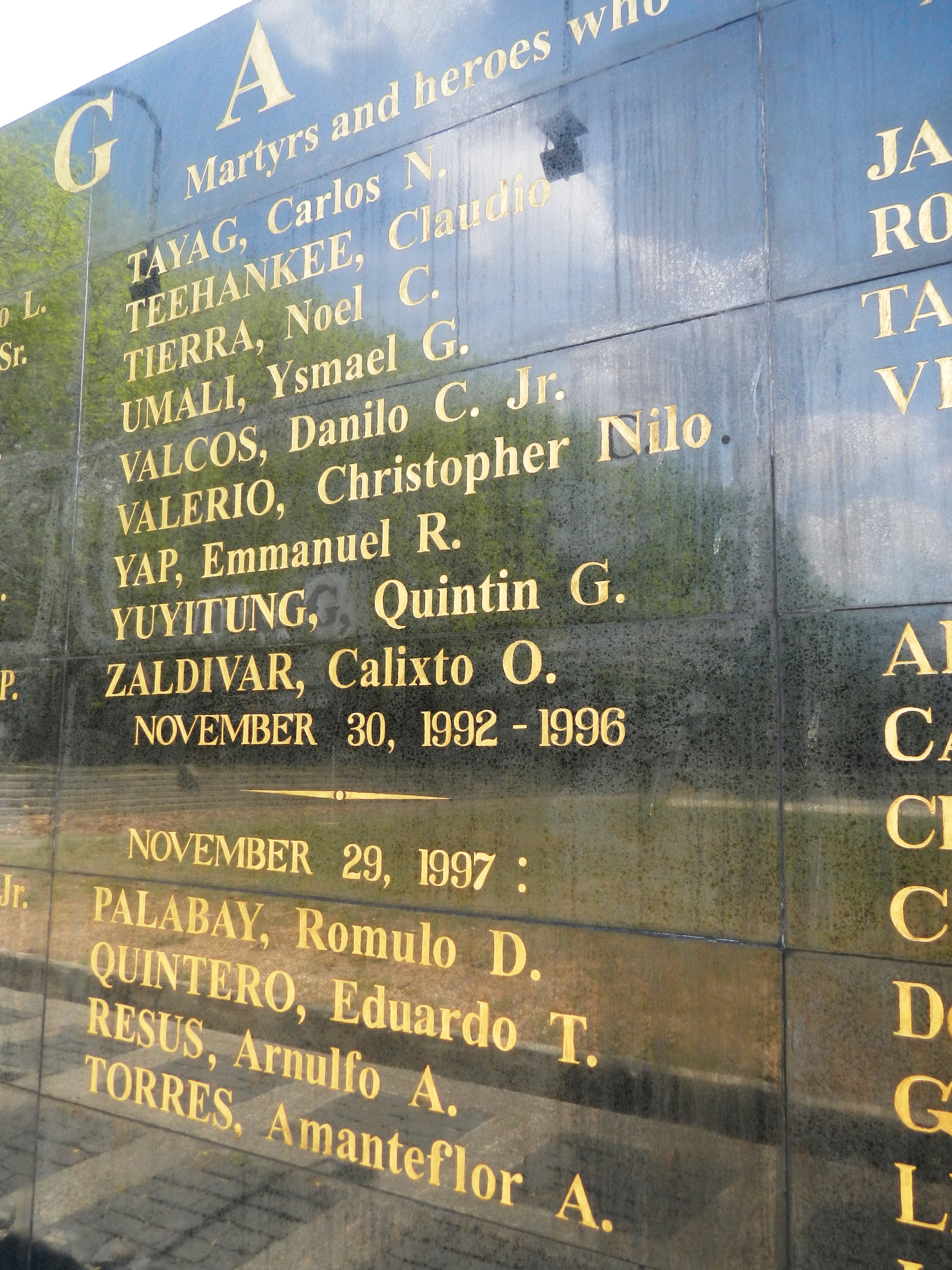
- Detail of the Wall of Remembrance at the Bantayog ng mga Bayani, showing names from the first batch of Bantayog Honorees, including that of Carlos Tayag.

Personal life
- Born: August 24, 1942 Angeles, Pampanga, Commonwealth of the Philippines
- Died: August 17, 1976 (aged 33) Quezon City, Philippines
- Cause of death: Forced disappearance

Religious life
- Religion: Roman Catholic

Carlos "Caloy" Nuqui Tayag O.S.B. (August 24, 1942 – disappeared August 17, 1976) was a Filipino Benedictine deacon and activist.

He was one of the many desaparecidos and victims of the violations of human rights during the martial law of the late dictator Ferdinand Marcos. Tayag is one of the martial-law era martyrs whose name is etched and honored at the Bantayog ng mga Bayani memorial.

== Early life ==
Tayag, whose baptismal name was Bartolome, was born on August 24, 1942, in Angeles, Pampanga to Fidel and Irenea Nuqui-Tayag. He studied his elementary at the Holy Family Academy and had his Secondary and Undergraduate Education at San Beda College. He was described as too helpful and too down-to-earth. He was fond of the Jesuits and of doing mission and visits among rural folk.

== Activism ==
He was described as someone who wanted to give Filipinos freedom and a better life from the oppression under President Marcos.

He entered San Beda as an ordained deacon or monk under the Order of Saint Benedict. He was able to travel to many Asian countries and became a correspondent of an international newspaper where he exposed the conditions of Filipinos under Marcos to the international audience. Marcos was able to read an article of his in the newspaper and earned the ire of the Armed Forces of the Philippines and the Philippine Constabulary.

He had been studying for ten years for the priesthood where he took the name Carlos Maria. He was shaped by the rise of liberation theology and, in his own words, defined the Christian faith as addressing "those who are losing hope, the poor and powerless, those being held captive." He said that such faith "was rooted in promoting human freedom within the political, economic, and cultural context: this is a human duty brought forth by the spirituality and the experiences of a suffering humanity."

Several months before his scheduled ordination to priesthood in 1970, Tagag asked for his rite to be suspended. He then studied his Postgraduate at the University of the Philippines Diliman taking up master's degree in Philippine Literature. He furthered his activism after being involved in the social realities that time. He became one of the leaders of the Student Christian Movement of the Philippines where he edited its newsletter Breakthrough.

Along with other figures like Fr. Dave Albano, Fr. Edicio de la Torre, and Purificacion "Puri" Pedro, he was one of the founding members of the Christians for National Liberation in 1972 and sought theological reforms and transformation of religious institutions under the context of martial law. Tayag was those assigned to do work in the countryside as he also worked underground.

== Disappearance ==
Tayag was last seen by his family at San Beda. On August 17, 1976, he was reportedly abducted and threatened by gunpoint by unidentified armed men in a house in Quezon City while he was typing on his typewriter. His mother and other relatives went to the National Intelligence Service Agency (NISA) headquarters at V. Luna St., Quezon City to inquire about his whereabouts but to no avail. An unidentified officer was said to have ordered his subordinate to look under a file list of supposed "Christian leftists" after knowing that he was an ordained deacon. He was thirty-three at the time of his disappearance.

After a month, Irenea Tayag received information that his son was being detained in Camp Bicutan and hurried to the Camp. He brought a big can of biscuits but was informed that no one by the name of Carlos Tayag was ever detained there.

To aid with the cause of desaparecidos, Irenea Tayag founded the Families of Victims of Involuntary Disappearances (FIND) and eventually became its chairperson.
