= Promotion of Church Peopleʼs Response =

Ecumenical organization in the Philippines

- Abbreviation: PCPR
- Purpose: Progressive ecumenical activism
- Region served: Philippines
- Affiliations: Bagong Alyansang Makabayan

The Promotion of Church Peopleʼs Response (PCPR) is a progressive ecumenical organization of ordained and lay church people based in the Philippines. The group has multiple chapters around the country, and has presence as well among Filipino church people around the world.

PCPR is affiliated with the Bagong Alyansang Makabayan (BAYAN), a coalition of progressive organizations.

== History ==
PCPR was established by progressive church people under the dictatorship of former president Ferdinand Marcos Sr.

== Advocacies ==
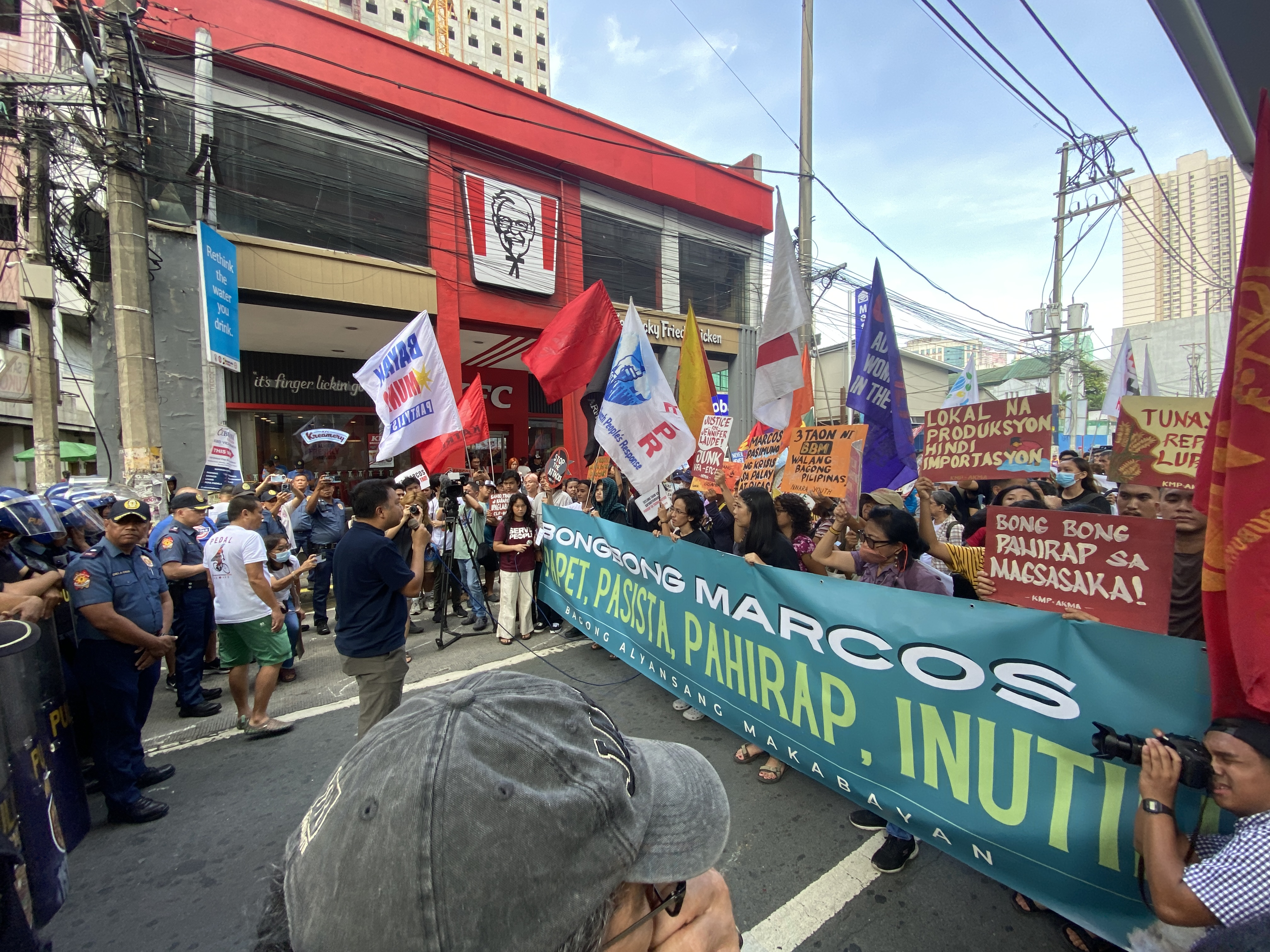
Participation of PCPR in the mobilization against President Marcos Jr.'s 3rd year in office.

PCPR has been consistent in upholding human rights in the Philippines. Former Chairperson of Promotion of Church Peopleʼs Response–Central Luzon Iglesia Filipina Independiente (IFI) Supreme Bishop Alberto Ramento have been known to be in solidarity with peasants, including the plight of those in Hacienda Luisita.

Efforts in human rights include participation in mass mobilizations and submissions of Universal Periodic Reviews to the United Nations Human Rights Council like in 2012 and 2017. For 2012, the organization raised concerns for church people who have experienced political persecution under former presidents Gloria Macapagal-Arroyo and Benigno Aquino III. Church people Bro. Benjamin Bayles and Bishop Alberto Ramento, both from the IFI and Fr. Fausto Tentorio of the Roman Catholic Church were said to be red-tagged and killed by state forces. For 2017, Nardy Sabino, Secretary-General, submitting for the review of human rights violations under the term of former president Aquino III and the first few months of former president Rodrigo Duterte said that it is the mandate of the church to ensure the promotion and protection of human rights in any nation." He condemned the more than fifty cases of demolitions against urban poor communities during the term of Aquino III, said to have affected more than 16,000 families. Sabino also warned how the drug war under Duterte could lead to human rights violations against activists as well.

In 2013, Fr. Benjamin Alforque of PCPR spoked fondly of Pope Francis during his papal visit to the Philippines in 2013, remembering how the former pontiff chose the name Francis, wanting a poor church for the poor. He raised concerns on very 'militarized' security measures and he hoped that the Pope would see the marginalized Filipinos beyond the security preparations.

The group also criticized the alleged corruption of the budget under former president Aquino III through the Disbursement Acceleration Program.

PCPR reacted when former First Lady Imelda Marcos attended a mass at Baclaran Church dedicated to the victims of martial law in 2016. The group said that Filipinos must not forget the sacrifices and human rights violations that Filipinos back then went through and their contribution in restoring democracy.

Alforque, in 2018, condemned the arrest and deportation of Australian nun Sr. Patricia Fox who has been a long-time advocate of Filipino farmers.

In 2021, the PCPR rallied against the 2021 State of the Nation Address of former president Duterte. The group called to end corruption, state violence, militarist wars, and selling out of patrimony of the West Philippine Sea under Duterte. PCPR also called for the abolishment of the National Task Force to End Local Communist Armed Conflict and the repeal of the Anti-Terrorism Act. The group said that “wicked leaders must not be allowed to reign." The protest was held at the University of the Philippines Diliman. PCPR, along with Iglesia Filipina Independiente, Rural Missionaries of the Philippines, Roman Catholic Church, and Student Christian Movement of the Philippines were among the church groups red-tagged and maligned under the Duterte administration.

In response to the court decision unfavorable to 'Tacloban 5' activists Frenchie Mae Cumpio and Marielle Domequil, United Church of Christ in the Philippines pastor Rev. Homar Distajo of PCPR expressed deep concern and called for the freedom of the two political prisoners.

PCPR announced rallies commemorating the 40th anniversary of EDSA People Power, including a rally in Cagayan de Oro City.
