= Theology of struggle =

Theological movement in the Philippines

The Protestant and Catholic churches saw that the Lumad and Moro people were suffering and responded by contextualizing liberation theology into what would be called the Theology of Struggle. The theology of struggle was developed by the Christians for National Liberation. The Philippines was colonized by Spain, Japan, and the United States since the 1500s. The theology of struggle was started in the Catholic church as a way of protecting the impoverished from the Marcos regime. The Sisters of the Good Shepherd is a group of Filipino nuns living according to what they call a theology of struggle. The nuns live among the impoverished and work alongside them to build political power, which puts them at odds with the Catholic Church and the Filipino government.
