= Lean Alejandro =

Filipino activist (1960–1987)

- Lean Alejandro (standing with a microphone) during a students' protest against Marcos
- Born: Leandro Legara Alejandro; July 10, 1960; Navotas, Rizal, Philippines
- Died: September 19, 1987 (aged 27); Quezon City, Philippines
- Education: University of the Philippines Diliman (no degree)
- Organizations: Colegium Liberium; Philippine Collegian; Anti-Imperialist Youth Committee; Youth for Nationalism and Democracy; SAMASA; UP Diliman University Student Council; Center for Nationalist Studies; People's MIND; Justice for Aquino, Justice for All; Nationalist Alliance for Justice, Freedom and Democracy; BAYAN
- Movement: People Power Revolution
- Spouse: Lidy Nacpil (m. 1986)
- Children: 1

Leandro "Lean" Legara Alejandro (July 10, 1960 – September 19, 1987) was a student leader and left-wing nationalist political activist in the Philippines.

== Early life and education ==
Alejandro was born in 1960 in Navotas, the eldest son of Rosendo Alejandro and Salvacion Legara. He studied at St. James Academy before continuing his education at the University of the Philippines (UP) in Diliman in 1978.

Alejandro later recalled not noticing the initial martial law declaration by Ferdinand Marcos as a 12-year-old on September 23, 1972, only that "we missed the TV shows we used to watch". During a later referendum on martial law, he was among those who voted "yes" for its continuation, with his family being entirely composed of Marcos supporters.

== University ==
Alejandro began a B.Sc. Chemistry as a preparatory course to medicine, and joined the Campus Crusade for Christ during his freshman year, but he switched courses to Philippine Studies after taking classes in history and political science and discovering Marxism. He joined the university's short-lived Anti-Imperialist Youth Committee, which later became the national student umbrella organization Youth for Nationalism and Democracy (YND) on August 17, 1980. He also joined the Philippine Collegian, the UP student publication, as a features writer, where he wrote articles critical of the Marcos administration. He established the Center for Nationalist Studies (CNS) in 1983.

Alejandro held several positions in the university after leaving the Collegian. He was elected chair of the College of Arts and Sciences Student Council in 1982–83, and vice chairman and then chairman of the UP Student Council in 1983–84, which was dissolved three years after it was established after opposing a tuition fee raise. In 1981, he led a rally to Mendiola Street, the first after martial law was lifted. The Student Council became vocal on national issues following the assassination of Ninoy Aquino. Alejandro participated in protests against the assassination, one of the largest student rallies for some time.

== Activism and imprisonment ==
Alejandro was involved in the formation of broad multi-sector organizations during the Martial Law rule of Ferdinand Marcos, including "PAPA" during the visit of Pope John Paul II in 1981, and People's MIND in 1982 against Marcos's national referendum. His activism began in earnest following Aquino's murder in 1983, when he joined the anti-Marcos protests and the Justice for Aquino, Justice for All (JAJA) movement. He dropped out of university to become a full-time activist, organizing the resistance against the Marcos regime. He was also part of the Movement for the Philippine Sovereignty and Democracy (KAAKBAY) led by former Senator José W. Diokno, and the Nationalist Alliance for Justice, Freedom and Democracy (NAJFD) under Diokno in 1984. In 1985, the Bagong Alyansang Makabayan (Bayan) was established, and Alejandro became its secretary-general leading the alliance together with former senator Lorenzo M. Tañada. Alejandro was a prominent member of the "parliament of the streets" during the 1980s, alongside Crispin Beltran, Lorenzo Tañada, and other Filipino nationalist leaders.

On February 13, 1985, Alejandro and friend Jose Virgilio Bautista were arrested while negotiating on behalf of students marching to Camp Aguinaldo, and taken to Camp Ipil detention center in Fort Bonifacio. They were held on a Preventive Detention Arrest (PDA), a Marcos decree that authorized the detention of any person for one year without charge.

Life in custody was bearable for Alejandro, and he continued to participate in the anti-Marcos movement by correspondence. Human rights lawyer Wigberto Tañada represented both Alejandro and Bautista during their detainment. After two months, Alejandro and Bautista were released thanks to a campaign for their release from both domestic and international supporters. After his release, Alejandro returned to the protest movement.

After the People Power Revolution of 1986, Alejandro ran for Congress, standing unsuccessfully for the congressional seat of Malabon-Navotas against Tessie Aquino-Oreta, sister-in-law of President Corazon Aquino.

== Assassination ==
On September 19, 1987, Alejandro left a press conference at the National Press Club where he announced plans for a nationwide strike against the military's role in government, and headed to the Bayan office on Rosal Street, Cubao. During the journey, a van cut into the path of his vehicle, rolled down the driver's window, and fatally shot Alejandro in the face and neck with a single shot.

== Personal life ==
Alejandro was married to Lidy Nacpil, a fellow socialist activist he had met at the university through mutual membership of the United Methodist Youth Fellowship and the Student Christian Movement of the Philippines. They were together for five years before they married in an ecumenical wedding at the University of the Philippines Protestant Chapel on January 18, 1986, with around 500 guests. They had one child together named Rusan (born March 9, 1987). Nacpil later became a prominent environmental activist, and would herself serve as secretary-general of Bayan by the 1990s.

== Legacy ==
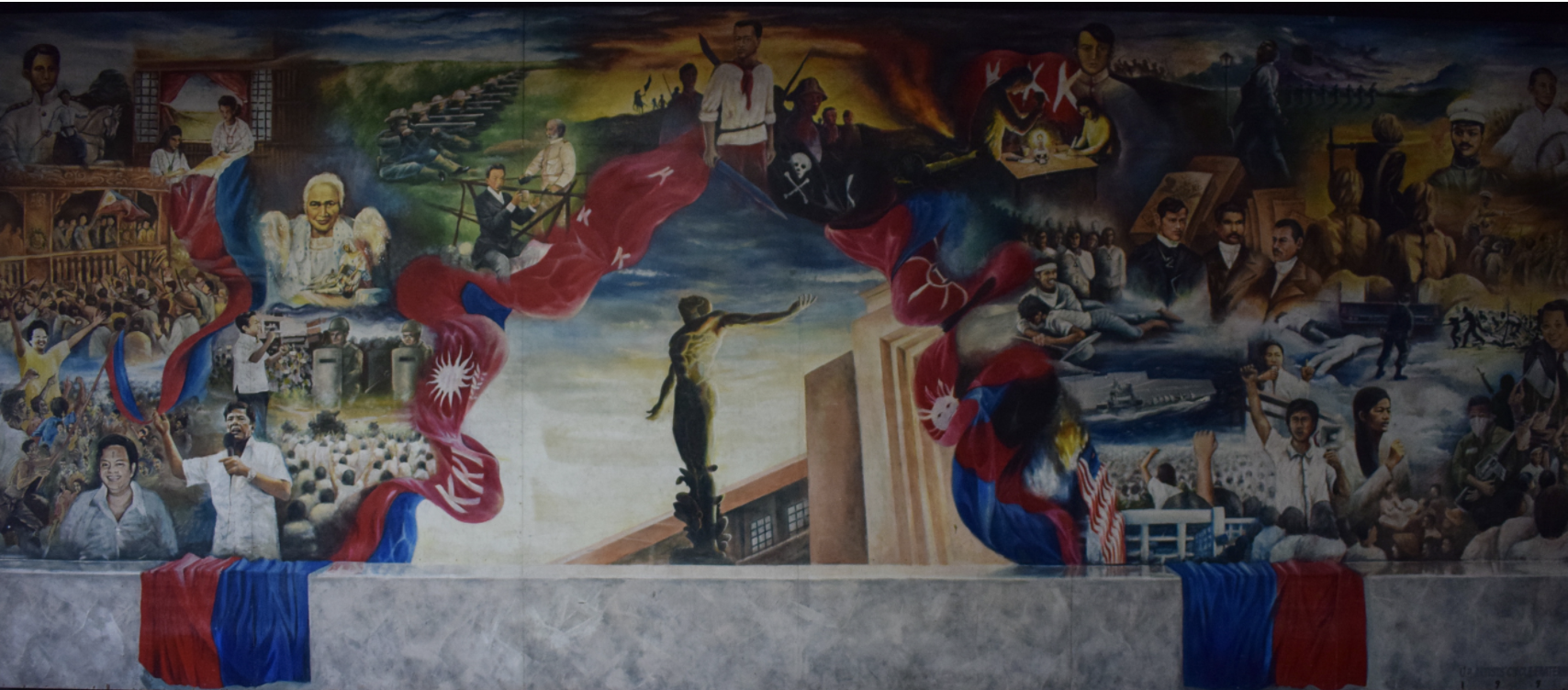
Alejandro, shown at the lower right of the Palma Hall, UP mural wearing white and holding a speaker

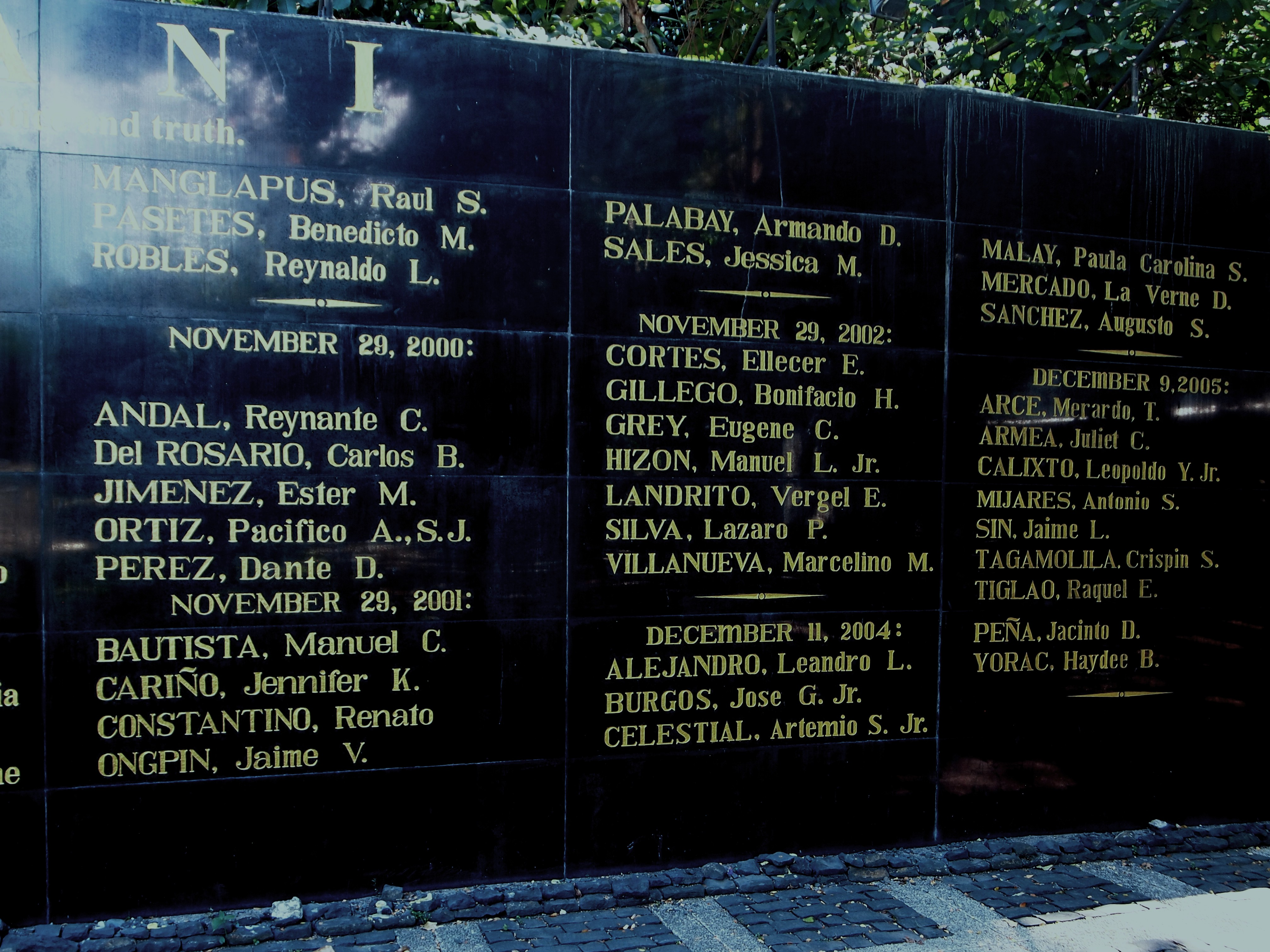
Detail of the Wall of Remembrance at the Bantayog ng mga Bayani, showing names from the 2004 batch of Bantayog Honorees, including that of Lean Alejandro.

The Leandro L. Alejandro Foundation (LLAF) was founded after the murder in 1987, to support the peace process under president Fidel Ramos, and organized in the early 1990s as a peace network, with Alejandro's widow Lidy Nacpil-Alejandro playing an active role.

In 1997, a musical play, Lean, was staged to commemorate the 10th anniversary of Alejandro's assassination. The play was revised and performed again a number of times during the 2010s.

A documentary entitled Lean: In the Line of Fire Is the Place of Honor was produced by Sandigan para sa Mag-aaral at Sambayanan (SAMASA) Alumni Association, the student political party under which Alejandro ran and won the chairmanship of the UP Diliman University Student Council in 1983. Alejandro's image can also be seen at the painting at the second floor lobby of Palma Hall, UP Diliman.

== See also ==
- University of the Philippines
- People Power Revolution
- UP Diliman University Student Council
- U.P. Naming Mahal
