= Romeo Crismo =

Filipino activist (disappeared 1980)

Romeo Guilao Crismo (8 December 1955–[disappeared] 12 August 1980) was a Filipino youth activist who disappeared during martial law under the dictatorship of President Ferdinand Marcos Sr..

Crismo's name is inscribed on the Bantayog ng mga Bayani Wall of Remembrance honoring martyrs and heroes of martial law.

== Early life ==
Crismo was a son of a government employee, a postmaster from Cabarroguis, Quirino and their family were devout methodists. He was the eldest of seven. In 1972, he was elected the president of the high school student body. He was described as a voracious reader of social issues even when he was young. Later, he took accounting in St. Mary's College in Nueva Vizcaya due to the advice of his father; he initially wanted to take up law.

== Ecumenical activism ==
As executive secretary of the United Methodist Youth Fellowship of the United Methodist Church in the Philippines, he was instrumental in organizing the Protestant youth sector to resist the policies and programs of the dictatorship. Supporting himself by teaching, he also worked with the Student Christian Movement of the Philippines for its education work, the National Council of Churches in the Philippines, and the Christian Conference of Asia. He yearned a radical alternative under the martial law of Marcos Sr. While church leaders had suspicion upon him, he raised underground church resistance against the dictatorship. He became an accountant in 1977 working as a government employee, but still organized opposition against the dictatorship.

== Disappearance ==
Newlywed Romeo and Phebe relocated to Tuguegarao, Cagayan in 1980, where he taught at the Cagayan Teacher’s College and St. Louis College. Suspected state agents abducted him on August 11, but was saved by his students. However, he failed to show up in his class the next day and has been missing ever since. His wife and parents would go on almost daily relentless searching upon military camps of Cagayan and Isabela, and they even wrote letters to Imelda Marcos and then-Defence Minister Juan Ponce Enrile.

== See also ==
- Lists of people who disappeared
- Extrajudicial killings and forced disappearances in the Philippines
