= Cris Hugo =

- Born: Cris Dellomas Hugo; June 13, 1985; Irosin, Sorsogon, Philippines
- Died: March 19, 2006 (aged 20); Legazpi City, Albay, Philippines
- Cause of death: Gunshot wounds
- Resting place: Irosin, Sorsogon, Philippines
- Education: Bicol University College of Arts and Letters (Journalism)
- Occupations: Student leader, campus journalist
- Organizations: League of Filipino Students; Alpha Phi Omega
- Known for: Student activism; subject of the Gawad Cris Hugo tribute award
- Relatives: Mother: Rowena Hugo; sister: Cerielene Dellomas Digo

Cris Dellomas Hugo (June 13, 1985 – March 19, 2006) was a Bicolano student leader and member of the League of Filipino Students (LFS) and Alpha Phi Omega while studying Journalism at Bicol University. He was shot dead at age 20 in Legazpi City, Albay, in an attack widely decried by human-rights and student groups. The case has remained the subject of calls for justice from civil society organizations.

== Early life and education ==
Hugo was born in Irosin, Sorsogon, Philippines. He studied at the Peñafrancia Seminary in Sorsogon City during secondary school for two years before pursuing Journalism at the College of Arts and Letters, Bicol University.

== Activism and death ==
While at Bicol University, Hugo was active in campus journalism and student organizing with LFS and APO. On March 19, 2006, he was shot by unidentified assailants in Legazpi, Albay. Progressive organizations condemned the killing and linked it to a broader pattern of attacks on activists and student leaders in the Philippines.

=== Calls for justice ===
On April 8, 2015, Senator Aquilino "Koko" Pimentel III criticized the Philippine National Police (PNP) for its failure to resolve the killing of student activist Cris Hugo nine years earlier in Legazpi City. Pimentel questioned why the alleged perpetrators, reported to be part of a right-wing military group, remained at large. He argued that unless justice was served, the killing of political activists would continue to undermine the credibility of the government. Pimentel also pledged to maintain a database of all unsolved killings and pushed for legislation to make the crime of murder imprescriptible, so that perpetrators could still be prosecuted regardless of the passage of time.

== Legacy ==
In his honor, the Gawad Cris Hugo was established as part of the **LIYAB Regional Journalism and Arts Festival**, organized by the Pillars Publication of Ateneo de Naga University with the College Editors Guild of the Philippines (CEGP). The award recognizes excellence among collegiate campus journalists in the Bicol Region. In 2010, Catanduanes State Colleges’ official publication, the CSC Statesman, received the inaugural Gawad Cris Hugo.
