= Patricia Fox =

Australian religious Sister of Sion

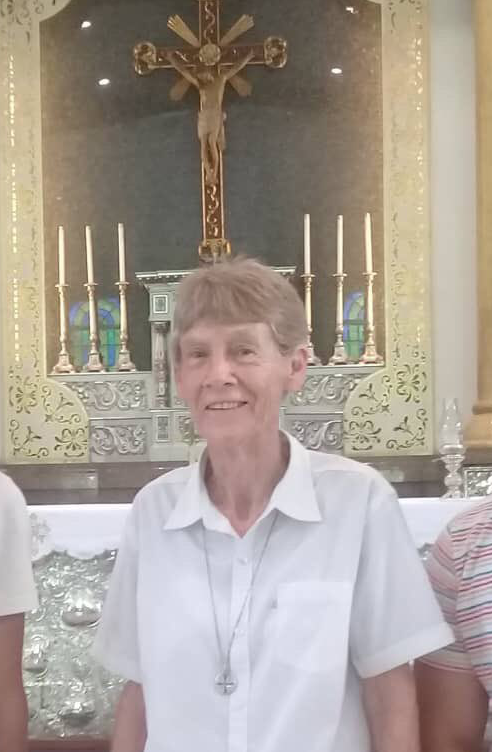
- Sister Patricia Fox at the Ateneo de Manila University, 2018

Personal life
- Known for: Ejected from the Philippines for political activism

Religious life
- Religion: Catholic Church
- Institute: Congregation of Our Lady of Sion

Patricia Fox is an Australian religious figure, a member of the Congregation of Our Lady of Sion. She is known for her ejection from the Philippines by president Rodrigo Duterte. Prior to this, she was the National Coordinator of the Rural Missionaries of the Philippines.

== Early life ==
Fox was raised in the Box Hill area of Melbourne and was attended schools run by the Congregation of Our Lady of Sion. In 1969, she joined the congregation. She said that she was inspired to serve the poor people in the Philippines when she met a Filipina Franciscan Missionary of Mary in the 1970s in Jerusalem. The missionary told stories of the struggles of vulnerable sectors in the Philippines and how they rose and protested against the Marcos dictatorship. This gave way for Fox to be inspired by reading about and practicing liberation theology.

In the 1980s Fox went to University of New South Wales, where obtained her law degree, and thereafter helped in legal aid centers. She had an opportunity to go to the Philippines in 1984, where she found "no distinction between the church and movement for justice" which immensely inspired her.

== Vocation ==
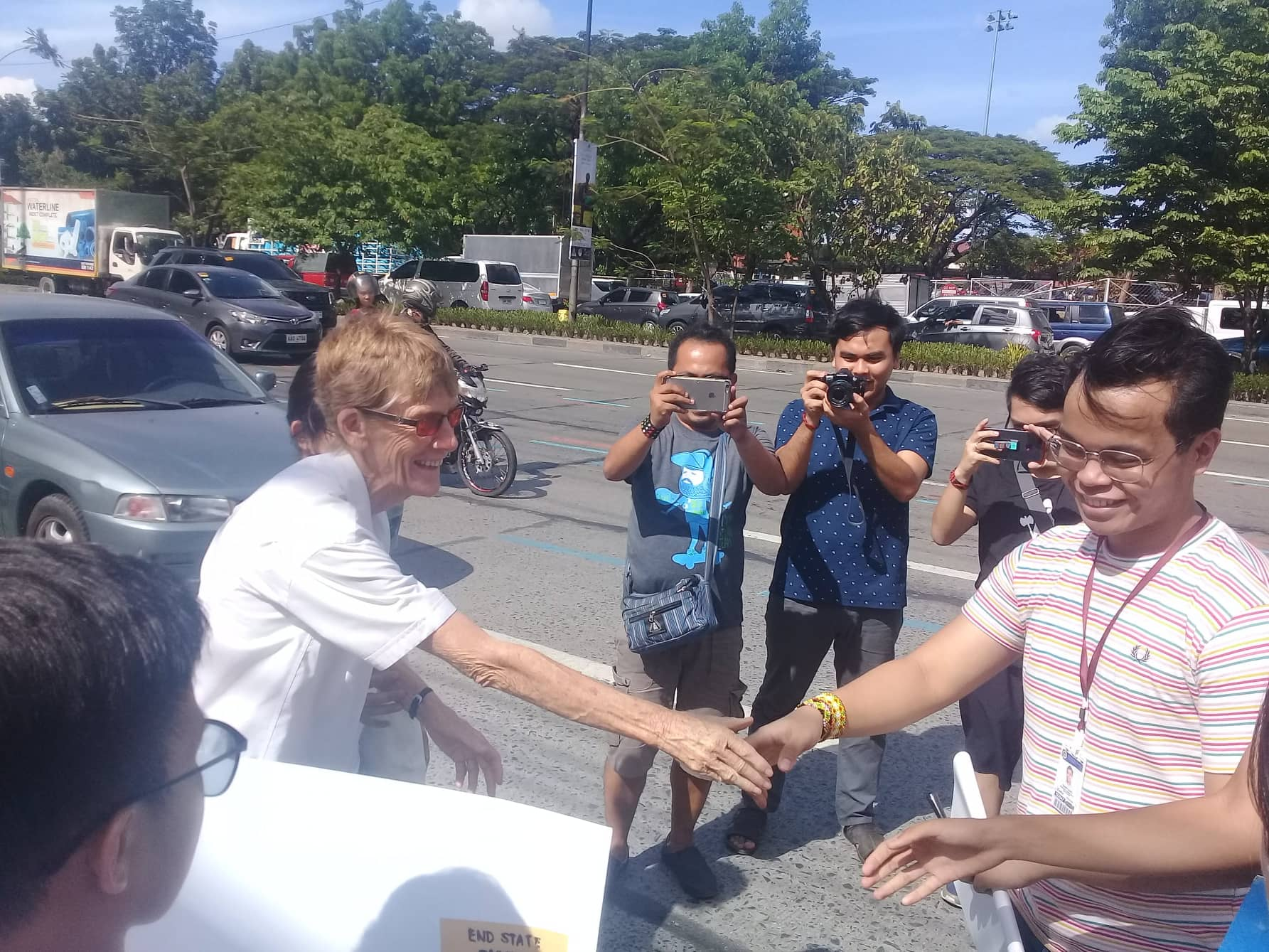
Sister Fox being greeted by supporters from Ateneo de Manila University.

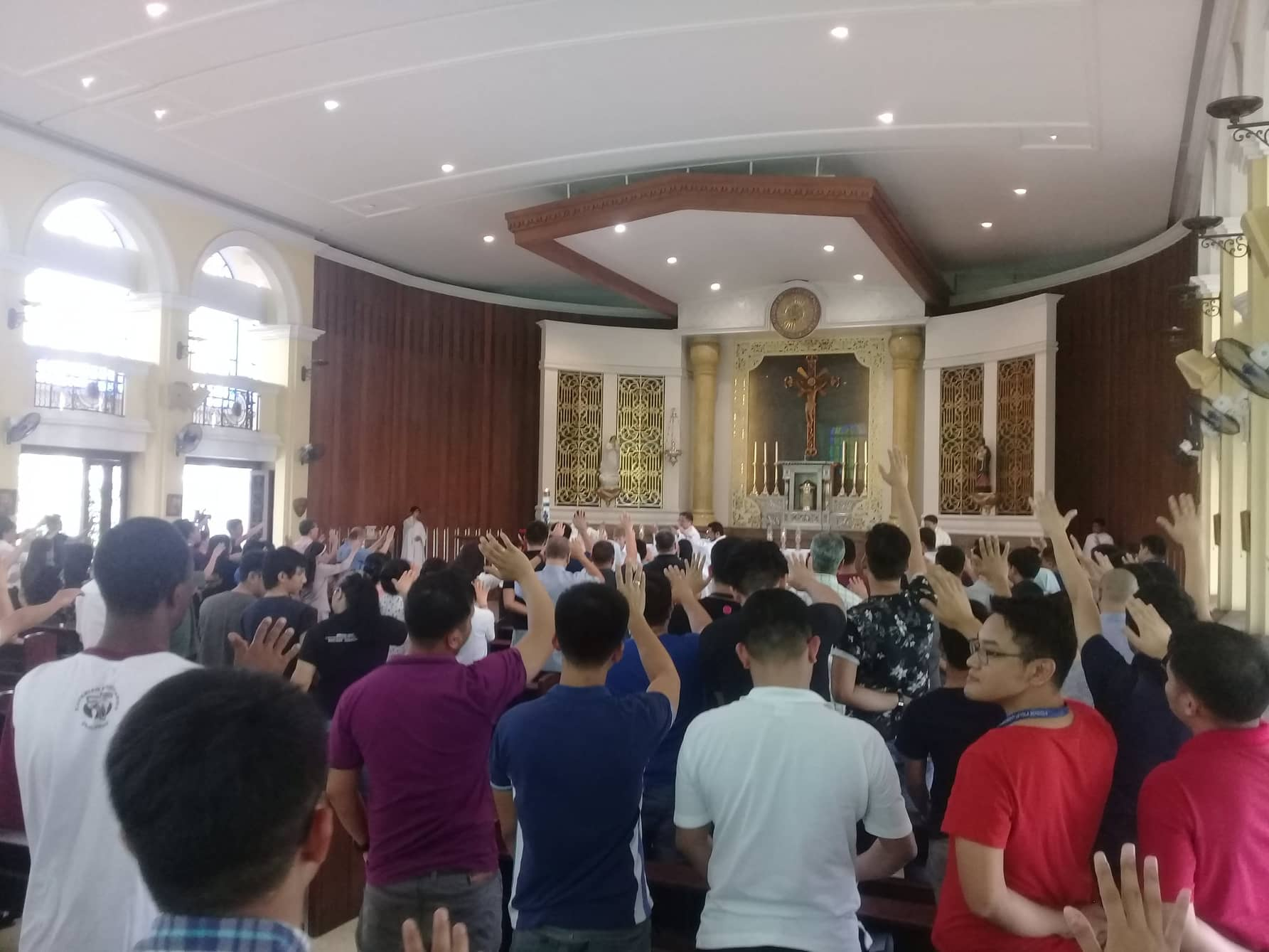
Sister Fox being blessed in a mass at the Loyola School of Theology.

Fox moved to the Philippines in 1990, where she co-founded a Congregation of Our Lady of Sion. She lived in the country for twenty-seven years, and served as mother superior of the congregation. Fox was concerned for the well-being of peasants and the urban poor. She has been quoted as saying, "The role of the religious is to be with those who are suffering, oppressed, to be with those who are asserting their rights." She joined the Rural Missionaries of the Philippines in 1991, became the Regional Coordinator for Central Luzon in 1998, then became the National Coordinator from 2000 until her departure from the Philippines. She participated in rallies, lobbying against destructive mining practices, as well as visiting police and military camps in locating detained people.

== Political concerns ==
Arrested at her convent in Quezon City, Fox was detained by the Philippine government on 16 April 2018 for questioning regarding her engagement in political activities, including joining rallies, visiting political prisoners, and criticizing government policies. The investigation was initiated after she had joined a fact-finding mission to Mindanao in relation to human rights abuses under martial law. She was denounced by Philippine president Rodrigo Duterte.

She was subsequently released and went back to her convent, although the Bureau of Immigration held back her passport as part of the ongoing investigation. She stressed that she joined rallies in solidarity of peasants, but not 'anti-government' rallies. She attended events, including masses in Ateneo de Manila University and University of the Philippines Diliman that prayed for her safety and for her to remain in the country.

Then Manila Auxiliary Bishop Broderick Pabillo said that these actions against Fox is a "form of persecution and harassment." Fr. Benjamon Alforque of the Promotion of Church Peopleʼs Response condemned the arrest and deportation of Australian nun Sr. Patricia Fox who has been a long-time advocate of Filipino farmers.

Fox left the country in November 2018, saying that the Bureau "played dirty", by waiting until the last minute by issuing a deportation order on October 31, 4pm, because she was told that she is about to be deported on November 3, a date preceded by two public holidays. She said that she "had no choice but to leave." She said that she departed the country "in shock" after spending many years among the lives and struggles of the urban and rural poor in the Philippines.

She currently lives in Kew, Melbourne, at the convent of Our Lady of Sion. In order to adjust to the change from living among the poor in the Philippines, she has been traveling around Australia such as in Perth, Sydney, and Brisbane, in order to tell about the stories of marginalized sectors in the Philippines. She has also been active in telling stories by participating among online fora. She criticized Australian mining companies like OceanaGold in destructive mining practices that have been displacing indigenous peoples and have been committing human rights violations.

She is active in many advocacy groups, including Australian Catholic Religious Against Trafficking in Humans and Pax Christi Australia. She is also the Chairperson of the Australian chapter of the International Coalition of Human Rights in the Philippines.
