= Christians for National Liberation =

Underground organization in the Philippines

- Other name: CNL
- Founded: February 17, 1972
- Country: Philippines
- Allegiance: Communist Party of the Philippines
- Ideology: Christian communism Marxism-Leninism-Maoism; Liberation Theology; Theology of struggle
- Status: Active
- Part of: National Democratic Front of the Philippines

The Christians for National Liberation is an underground revolutionary mass organization in the Philippines committed to uniting Christians in the revolution led by the Communist Party of the Philippines. A member of the National Democratic Front of the Philippines, it supports the armed struggle waged by the New People's Army and led by the Communist Party of the Philippines.

Established in 1972, the CNL took inspiration from liberation theology movements in Latin America and the social justice imperative in Vatican II. It played a significant role during the Martial Law period in the Philippines. CNL members also participated in the armed struggle and joined the NPA. CNL is still active today as an underground movement.

== History and background ==
The impetus to establish the CNL began as early as the late 1960s, with a rise of political consciousness among members of the church. A "significant minority" became influenced by social and ideological factors emergent all over the world.

Within the Philippines, events such as the First Quarter Storm and the rise of national democracy galvanized Filipinos towards greater political and social action. Works such as Amado Guerrero's Philippine Society and Revolution provided a Marxist understanding of Philippine society. Outside the Philippines, the call to social action embedded in the Second Vatican Council and the rise of liberation theology in Latin America served as the inspiration for members of the church to be involved in political and social issues. The writings of Gustavo Gutiérrez and Paolo Freire were also widely known and circulated, while figures such as Camilo Torres Restrepo were popular among what was being labelled as the "Christian Left."

Organizations such as Philippine Priests Inc. were transformed from providing retirement benefits to providing an increasingly revolutionary critique of Philippine society. Edicio de la Torre and Luis Jalandoni were influential in radicalizing members of the PPI, and were also influential in inspiring Christian youth organizations such as the Student Christian Movement of the Philippines.

This culminated with the first assembly of the Christians for National Liberation on February 17, 1972, coinciding with the 100th year death anniversary of Fathers Gomez, Burgos, and Zamora. The assembly took place at the worship room of the Sampaloc University Center in Manila and was attended by 72 members. CNL declared that it was working with the Communist Party of the Philippines to "expose and oppose imperialism, feudalism, and bureaucratic capitalism" and to "arouse, mobilize and organize both the middle elements and the masses of our society for a protracted and disciplined struggle on all fronts." The founding assembly outlined the following major tasks for CNL members:

1. To expose and oppose imperialism, feudalism, and bureaucrat capitalism
2. To arouse, mobilize and organize the masses for a protracted and disciplined struggle on all fronts
3. To constantly remould ourselves and others away from selfishness and pride to selflessness and humble service to the people.

A second general assembly was held on August 19–20, 1972 at the Assumption Convent in Herran, Manila, and was attended by over two hundred delegates. The CNL and other political organizations were shortly forced underground following the imposition of Martial Law in the Philippines on September 21, 1972.

=== During Martial law ===
The CNL was the main organization for the church sector in the underground Left. It sought to mobilize members of the church into supporting the armed struggle and the transformation of churches around national democratic principles. CNL members adopted a "dual persona" during the Martial law years, working in legal organizations while also participating in underground activities. CNL members were placed in strategic Church institutions and social action programs, mobilized and utilized Church resources such as schools and convents, organized communities through Basic Christian Communities, channeled Church funds to support the CPP, and supported people's struggles and collective action.

On April 24, 1973, the CNL participated in the founding Congress of the National Democratic Front of the Philippines, becoming part of its united front. Owing to the Church's established infrastructure, CNL quickly became "the most organized and extensive ideological group that offered a Marxist-Leninist-Maoist framework for social transformation" within the NDFP. By 1981, the CNL was the largest organization within the NDFP.

CNL members supported the La Tondeña workers' strike in 1975, the first workers' strike under Martial Law. Priests and nuns, including those who were members of the CNL, joined the strike to prevent police harassment. CNL members were also instrumental in pressuring Jaime Cardinal Sin and other Roman Catholic bishops into being critical of the Marcos dictatorship.

CNL members faced harassment and arrest during Martial Law. In 1973, Jalandoni and nun Coni Ledesma were arrested. The following year, CNL founding Chairperson Ed de la Torre was also arrested. Jalandoni and Ledesma would be released in 1974 and have continued to work with the NDFP ever since. de la Torre would be released nine years later in 1983.

Despite close links with the CPP, few members during the 1970s and 80's desired Party membership, owing to a feeling that Church membership and communism were contradictory. Despite this, many CNL members supported and joined the armed struggle in the countryside led by the New People's Army, describing it as "the highest expression of loving God and loving one’s neighbor." Many CNL members during this time also still identified with the organization despite its links to the CPP.

=== Post-Marcos dictatorship ===
Political activity within the Church declined after 1986 in the aftermath of the People Power revolution and the inauguration of Corazon Aquino as president. Church members close to the Aquino administration were involved in both her cabinet and in drafting the 1987 constitution.

The CNL remained firm in its revolutionary stance despite optimism within the church for the Aquino government. In 1987, CNL held its Third Mindanao Congress which denounced the "church-backed US-Aquino regime" for its support for anti-communist vigilante groups such as Alsa Masa.

Ideological, political, and organizational splits within the CPP and the revolutionary Left also affected CNL. During this, CNL first tried to adopt a neutral stance during its 1990 Congress, but could not escape increasing divisions between "reaffirmists" and "rejectionists" within the Left. Eventually, CNL chose to reaffirm. Some former CNL members, including rejectionists like dela Torre decided to break with the organization to explore other avenues of social activism, eventually establishing the social-democratic organization Akbayan and becoming the head of Technical Education and Skills Development Authority in 1998.

CNL held its 9th Congress in September 2022, electing a new set of officers and ratifying a four-year plan emphasizing participation in the armed struggle and the resumption of peace talks between the Government of the Republic of the Philippines and the NDFP.

== Ideology ==
Members of the CNL consider themselves to be "Christians and revolutionaries." The organization subscribes to what it defines as the theology of struggle, which shares similarities with liberation theology. The theology of struggle emphasizes the role of the Church in the Filipino people's movement for national liberation, and shares in that respect ideas found in national democracy. CNL emphasized the link between theology and activism.

CNL also reaffirmed the NDFP's program of action, emphasizing the need to "fulfill the Christian imperative of the revolution." The CNL has criticized the Catholic Church's stance on social action, specifically commenting on the Compendium of the Social Doctrine of the Church, criticizing the Church as "slanted towards monopoly capitalism and [denying] the common good of socialism."

== See also ==
- National Democratic Front of the Philippines
- Theology of struggle
- Religious sector resistance against the Marcos dictatorship
