= Lidy Nacpil =

Filipino human rights, environmental and climate activist

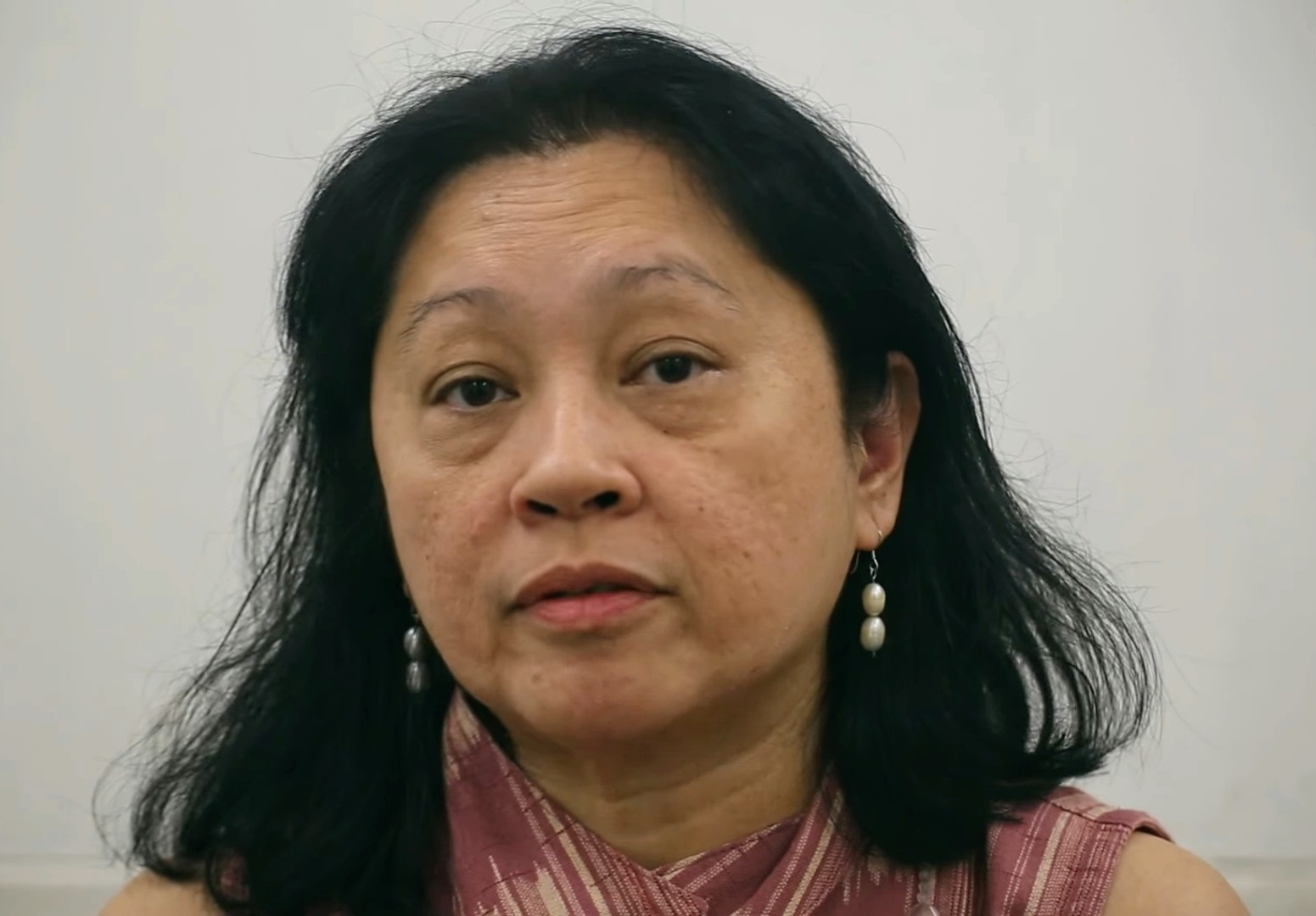
- Organizations: Bayan (1985–1990s); Sanlakas; Freedom from Debt Coalition (FDC); Asian Peoples' Movement on Debt and Development (APMDD)
- Spouse: Lean Alejandro (1986 until his death in 1987)
- Children: 1

Lidy Nacpil is a Filipino human rights, environmental, gender and social justice activist. She is the coordinator of the Asian Peoples' Movement on Debt and Development, also known as Jubilee South, an international advocacy organization focused on climate justice.

== Activism ==
Nacpil began her activism when she was a student. Her first husband Lean Alejandro was killed in 1987 during the martial rule of President Cory Aquino. In the Peace Network developed by the Leandro L. Alejandro Foundation after his death, Nacpil had a major role in its work after Fidel V. Ramos became president.

After the killing of her husband, Nacpil intensified her human, economic and social justice activism. In 1999, as part of the Jubilee 2000 coalition and on behalf of the Freedom from Debt Coalition, she advocated for debt relief from the World Bank and IMF for the most impoverished countries in the world. In 2001, she traveled on behalf of Jubilee South to conduct teach-ins in New York and Washington, and to Canada to promote activist events at G20, World Bank, and IMF meetings. In 2009, while a Jubilee South coordinator, she spoke with Naomi Klein about the climate debt proposal, for countries creating the climate crisis to pay for the impacts on other countries, telling Klein it is "something that is owed to us, because we are dealing with a crisis not of our making" and "Climate debt is not a matter of charity."

She has held executive positions in national, regional and global rights groups. She is the coordinator of the Asian Peoples' Movement on Debt and Development, which organizes dozens of member organizations and is based in Manila. Her COP27 briefing in November 2022 with Thuli Makama from the Asian Peoples' Movement on Debt and Development focused on the benefits of ending fossil fuel subsidies and increasing taxes on oil and gas production.

She is also co-coordinator of the Global Campaign to Demand Climate Justice, and vice president of the Freedom from Debt Coalition and co-coordinator of the Global Campaign to Demand Climate Justice. She has also served as a board observer for the Green Climate Fund.
