= League of Filipino Students =

Philippine left-wing political organization

League of Filipino Students Kapisanan ng mga Pilipinong Mag-Aaral
- Secretary General: Daphne Villafuerte
- Founded: September 11, 1977; 49 years ago
- Preceded by: Alliance of Students Against Tuition Fee Increase
- Succeeded by: Kamalayan (LFS-NCR splinter)
- Headquarters: Manila, Philippines
- Membership: More than 5,000
- Ideology: National democracy
- Colours: Red Yellow
- Mother party: Bagong Alyansang Makabayan
- International affiliation: International League of People's Struggle

The League of Filipino Students (Filipino: Kapisanan ng mga Pilipinong Mag-Aaral, abbreviated as LFS) is a student-led national democratic mass organization and movement organized during the martial law era in the Philippines on September 11, 1977. It claims to be the leading anti-imperialist organization of the Filipino youth, under the ideological line of national democracy. It is part of the broader movement known as Bagong Alyansang Makabayan.

== Brief history ==
The League of Filipino Students started on September 11, 1977, as an alliance against tuition fee increases and school repression during the Martial law era.

During the Marcos regime, students were principal protesters against the government. While the League focused on broad and unifying issues, including the restoration of student councils and governments in the Philippines, it has directed its attack against the government with the use of student protests, strikes, and mobilizations.

The assassination of Benigno Aquino Jr. in 1983, the Marcos' government became vulnerable and the organization sets off a nationwide student mobilization. They have participated in protests against the government and have joined street demonstrations with workers which shifted the group into student radicalism. They became the principal actors in the removal of Ferdinand Marcos from power.

== Ideology ==
The League of Filipino Students ascribes to the national democracy movement (locally known as ND), a Filipino left-wing alliance of various socialist, communist, and Marxist-Leninist-Maoist organizations that opposes foreign imperialism, landlordism, monopolistic capitalism, and corrupt government officials.

It is a youth activist group that primarily organizes among the anti-imperialist line. It opposes the existence of the Philippines as a neocolony of the United States. The League synthesizes that the roots of poverty in the Philippines at the present are caused by the continuous presence of American power in the country.

== Alumni ==
- Cris Hugo
- Alyssa Alano, RJ Ledesma, and Lyle Prijoles, victims of the Toboso encounter
