= Rural Missionaries of the Philippines =

National advocacy organization

The Rural Missionaries of the Philippines is a national organization in the Philippines composed of female and male religious clergy and laypeople who advocate for the welfare of peasants in the Philippines. The organization engages in missionary and advocacy work among rural communities of farmers, fisherfolk, and indigenous people on the improvement of their lives and on their human rights. The group has faced continuous opposition from the Philippine government because of its missionary work.

== History ==
The organization was formed on August 15, 1969, as one of the many mission partners of the Association of Major Religious Superiors in the Philippines.

During the martial law era under then-dictator Ferdinand Marcos, Sr., its members were active in the resistance movement. Inocencio T. Ipong, a Roman Catholic lay worker of the RMP was abducted, illegally detained, and tortured in Camp Catitipan, Davao City in 1982.

In September 2017, the Rural Missionaries of the Philippines-Northern Mindanao Region, Kalumbay Regional Lumad Organization, and Kodao Productions took over the operations of DXJR and rebranded it as Radyo Lumad, serving as the community station for the Lumad. It transferred its operations to Brgy. Dahilayan. It carried news and commentaries from the Radyo ni Juan network every morning, while carrying local programming for the rest of the day.

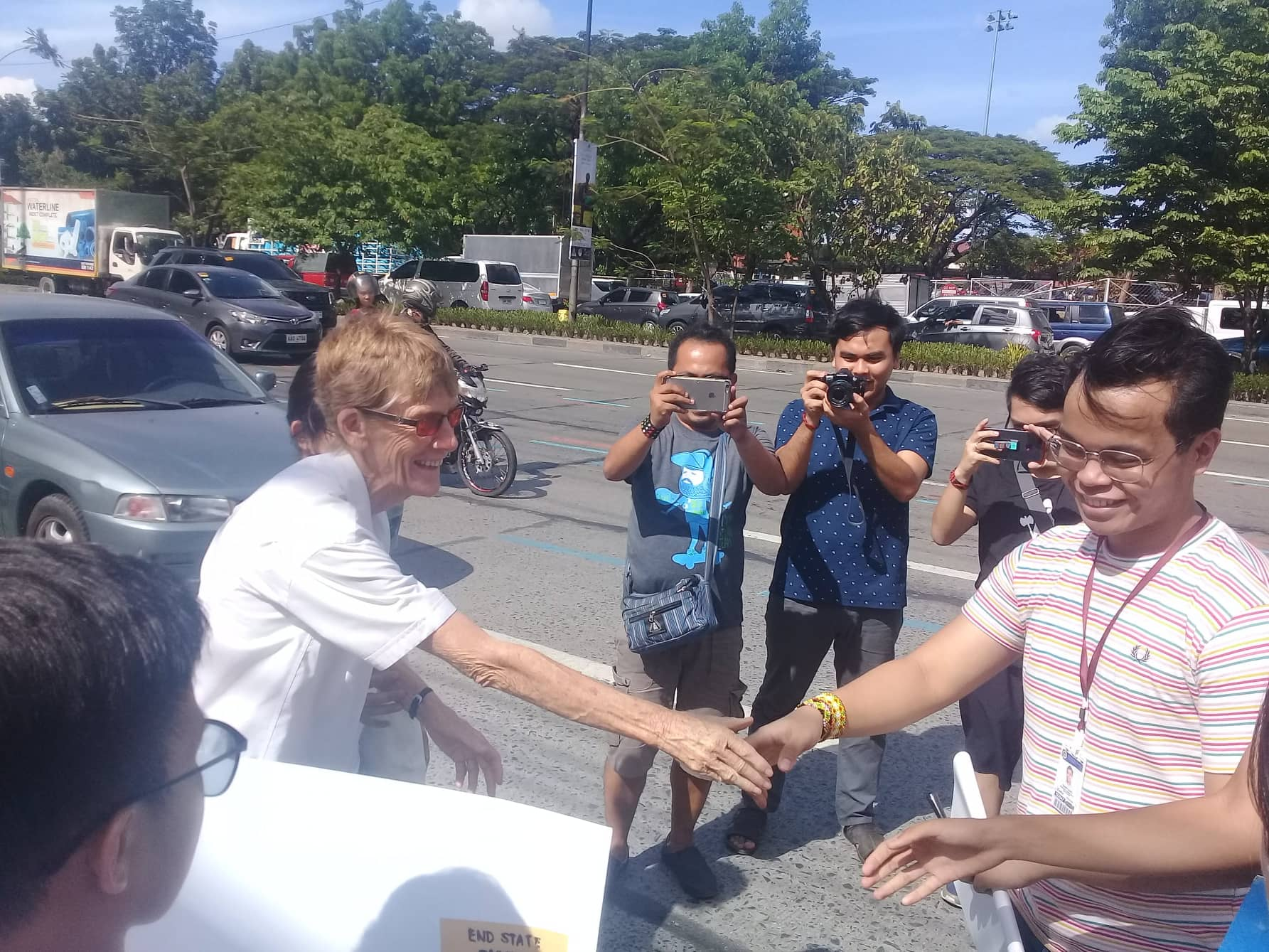
Sister Fox being greeted by supporters from Ateneo de Manila University.

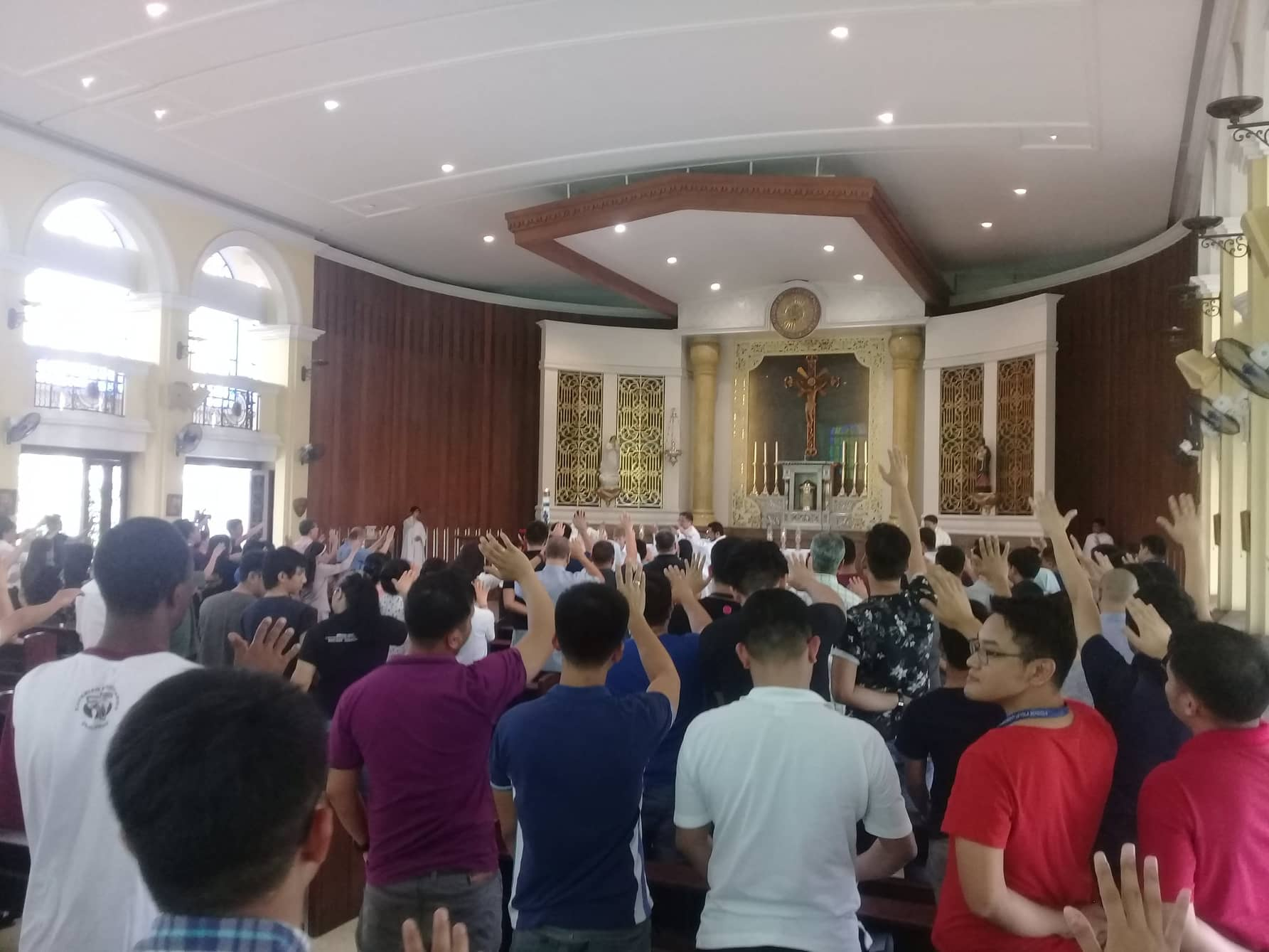
Sister Fox being blessed in a mass at the Loyola School of Theology.

RMP's then National Coordinator Sister Patricia Fox was detained by the Philippine government on April 16, 2018, for questioning regarding her engagement in political activities. The investigation was initiated after she had joined a fact-finding mission to Mindanao in relation to human rights abuses under martial law. She got the ire of then Philippine president Rodrigo Duterte. In November 2018, she was deported.

On August 15, 2022, the Department of Justice filed a case against the RMP in a trial court in Iligan City accusing them of financing the Communist Party of the Philippines and the New People's Army under the Anti-Terrorism Act of 2020. According to human rights groups, the Justice Department rushed the filing of the case in secrecy. Human rights groups and religious groups denounced the act and defended the RMP. RMP has denied the claim, saying that funds go to programs and services that help uplift the lives of the rural folk. They said that oppression against them is the "same climate of persecution and fear" that Christ faced under the ruling religious and political elite of His time. Fr. Elias Ayuban, Jr., the Provincial Superior of the Claretian Missionaries Philippine Province and co-chairperson of the Conference of Major Superior in the Philippines defended the nuns of the RMP by showing the photos of the missionary work of EMP especially during the tight lockdown during the COVID-19 pandemic. He stressed that care for the poor and marginalized is one major work of the religious and the sisters "have been doing this since time immemorial," and "they are seldom noticed or talked about because they do not call the media to cover their apostolic works."

On January 9, 2023, the Quezon City Metropolitan Trial Court Branch 139 acquitted ten human rights defenders from Karapatan, GABRIELA, and RMP of perjury. The case was charged by former National Security Advisor Hermogenes Esperon, Jr. who accused them of lying. Ecumenical youth group Student Christian Movement of the Philippines said that the acquittal was a "joint effort not only by the legal teams of organizations, but also by the wide support of Filipino masses and Filipino religious who stand by the defense of human rights and defense of our faith to serve the marginalized."

== Advocacy work ==
The RMP has been active in areas of rural poverty. The organization raise awareness on the plights and advocacies of rural folk. They also engage in exposing and denouncing human rights abuses in the Philippines. The group has also joined protest mobilizations in defense of human rights in the Philippines.
