= Protest theatre in the Philippines =

The use of theatre as a venue for protest in the Philippines has had a long history dating back to its colonial history, and continuing into the present day. It played a particularly important part during the Philippine American War, the Second World War, and during the Dictatorship of Ferdinand Marcos. But its development and prominence persisted and continues beyond those periods.

== During the Philippine American War ==
The use of theater as a form of political expression became a historically notable practice during the Philippine–American War, especially in the latter parts of the conflict after the forces of the First Philippine Republic had effectively been subdued. It became a means for Filipino writers who were sympathetic to Filipino nationalism, such as Juan Matapang Cruz, Aurelio Tolentino, Juan Abad, to express dissent to the American occupation of the Philippines.

== During World War II ==
Theater became a prominent venue for surreptitious protests during the Japanese occupation of the Philippines, to the degree that National Artist Daisy Hontiveros-Avellana called the era the "Golden Age of Philippine Theater." With plays being a popular form during this time, artists expressed dissent secretly in small, inconspicuous references which were understood by the viewers, but which slipped past censors. Resistance fighters also used plays as convenient venues for meetings, with the cast ready with prearranged signals in case Japanese authorities arrived and the fighters had to quickly get away.

== During the Post-war era ==
With sudden cultural chaos that came after the end of the war and the sudden political shift from the Commonwealth to the Third Philippine Republic, alongside the decimation of political infrastructure which came with the sheer devastation of Manila, Theater performances in the immediate postwar reconstruction period took a sudden shift towards mainstream western influences, featuring broadway hits and renditions of Shakespeare.

The rise of nationalism in the 1960s saw theatre companies began to correct for this shortcoming. Productions in local languages, which had been considered "baduy" ("lame") in the early 1960s, had become the norm by the time the decade ended. In the universities, pioneering cultural workers began establishing theater companies whose raison d'etre involved reaching out to the common Filipino, rather than the rich audiences whose tastes had dominated cultural life in the capital up to that point. These included the University of the Philippines Mobile Theater of Wilfredo Ma. Guerrero and the Kamanyang Players (later renamed "Samahang Kamanyang") of the Philippine College of Commerce. Cecile Guidote-Alvarez also established the Philippine Educational Theater Association (PETA) as a vehicle for Philippine Theater to play a role in the development of the country's people and society.

=== Philippine Educational Theater Association ===
On April 7, 1967, Cecile Guidote-Alvarez established the Philippine Educational Theater Association (PETA) who meant the organization to be a vehicle for Philippine Theater to play a role in the development of the country's people and society. Four years later in 1971, PETA was named the UNESCO-International Theater Institute Center in the Philippines. In the same year, coinciding with the 400th foundation anniversary of Manila, PETA organized the first Third World Theater Festival.

=== Samahang Kamanyang ===
The first of the major activist Theatre Companies of the Philippines' Martial Law era, Samahang Kamanyang, was actually established the Philippine College of Commerce (PCC, now the Polytechnic University of the Philippines) during this early period. It was founded by Lenore Gomez Palma as the "Kamanyang Players" ("Kamanyang" means "incense") in 1968 in an effort to promote dramatic arts in the school, a year before the first quarter storm, and nearly half a decade before Martial Law. It would later be renamed to the totally Filipino monicker "Samahang Kamanyang" ("Samahan" simply means "association") to better reflect the culture of its audiences.

Among the notable members were Jorge Checa, who would later establish the singing group called Salt of the Earth which performed in community meetings during Martial Law, and would later become a desaparecido while helping organize against the dictatorship among farmers in Zamboanga del Norte. Another was Napoleon Abiog, who would later establish the cultural group Tambisan sa Sining, which staged performances during protest actions both during and after Martial Law. Both Checa and Abiog would later be recognized by having their names engraved on the Wall of Remembrance at the Philippones' Bantayog ng Bayani which honors the martyrs and heroes who fought the authoritarian regime of Ferdinand Marcos, and worked to restore democratic governance to the Philippines.

Yet another early member was Carmen Pedrosa, whose involvement with Kamanyang and with the College Editors Guild of the Philippines led to her being invited among 15 other student leaders for a three-week study tour in China in August 1971, which turned into a 12-year exile after Marcos' actions after the Plaza Miranda bombing put them all on a blacklist which made it impossible for them to go back home.

== During the Marcos dictatorship ==
The beginning months of the 1970s marked a period of turmoil and change in the Philippines, which naturally had a significant impact on the theater arts. During his bid to be the first Philippine president to be re-elected for a second term, Ferdinand Marcos launched an unprecedented number of foreign debt-funded public works projects. This caused the Philippine economy took a sudden downwards turn known as the 1969 Philippine balance of payments crisis, which in turn led to a period of economic difficulty and a significant rise of social unrest.

=== Samahang Kamanyang, Gintong Silahis, Panday Sining, and Tanghalang Bayan ===
During the earliest days of the dictatorship, there were four prominent activist theater groups. One of these was Kamanyang Players, which was renamed Samahang Kamanyang, the official theater group of the Philippine College of Commerce now PUP. The three others were: Gintong Silahis, founded by Behn Cervantes as the theater arm of the Samahang Demokratiko ng Kabataan; Panday Sining, founded by Bonifacio Ilagan for the UP Diliman Chapter of the Kabataang Makabayan; and Tanghalang Bayan, a theater collective established by the urban poor in Tondo.

=== The rise of regional theater groups ===
This period also saw the rise of regional theater groups, such as the Makabugwas theater group in Samar, reflecting an increased awareness of the dictatorship's abuses and of the suffering of the people in the Philippine countryside. Many of these theater groups were established within the ambit of the Roman Catholic church, such as Patbutlak Cultural Theater, a diocesan theater group established within the Roman Catholic Diocese of Bacolod under Bishop Antonio Fortich.

Many of the founders of these groups were graduates of PETA’s three day Basic Integrated Theater Arts Workshop (BITAW) workshop course, whose alumni established theater groups in regions as varied as Davao, Lanao del Norte, Negros, Leyte, and Samar. On the island of Mindanao, these groups wer organized into the Mindanao Community Theater Network through the influence of BITAW alumnus and Redemptorist anthropologist, sociologist, theologian, and missionary Father Karl Gaspar.

==== Theater groups from UP Diliman ====
Contributing to the rise of regional theater groups were efforts with the University of the Philippines Diliman to bring theater to the countryside, particularly in the nearby provinces in Central Luzon. The "UP Tropang Bodabil" (Vaudeville Troupe) renamed itself Peryante and committed itself to street theater performances, And Behn Cervantes, who had founded Gintong Silahis for the SDK, also set out to create a theater group specifically for the University - the UP Repertory.

=== Playwrights and performers as human rights victims ===
Many of the members of these various theater companies later became victims of the various Human rights abuses of the Marcos dictatorship. Notable deaths among Panday Sining members included those of Merardo Arce, Leo Alto, and the brothers Romulo and Armando Palabay while Rizalina Ilagan was among the group of desaparecidos known as the Southern Tagalog 10. In Negros, Joji Paduano of Patbutlak Cultural Theater was also killed. Panday Sining founder Boni Ilagan, Gintong Silahis director Behn Cervantes, and Mindanao Community Theater Network founder Father Karl Gaspar were all arrested and tortured at various times during the dictatorship.

=== Last years of the dictatorship ===
1983, however, marked a turning point in national sentiment which came with the economic nosedive which had begun to be self-evident in March of that year, and the assassination of Marcos' political rival Ninoy Aquino upon coming home in attempt to reason with Marcos in late August. Playwrights soon discovered that topics which could only be hinted on before could be brought up in the open, and a wave of more boldly political plays were the result, including: Boni Ilagan's "Pagsambang Bayan II" which addressed its critique of the dictatorship openly; Bien Lumbera's rock opera "Bayani" (Hero) which featured music by Jim Paredes; Al Santos' PETA production "Nukleyar II" which featured guitar parts written by Joey Ayala; and Chris Millado's "Buwan at Baril" ("Moon and Gun"), another PETA production which critics considered a landmark in Martial Law protest theater because it presented the struggles of the era in terms of its impacts on individual characters, rather than broad social patterns.

== After the EDSA revolution ==
The ouster of Ferdinand Marcos by the civilian-led People Power Revolution in February 1986 marked a sudden shift in the political realities of the Philippines, and rapid changes to the themes which Philippine theater addressed in their plays. During the Martial Law years, the abuses of the dictator had been a major theme due to the urgency and importance of the topic. But the end of the regime allowed for the exploration of more topics. Other social issues could be addressed, such as education as in Rene Villanueva's 1998 "Pepe en Pilar"; press killings as in Lito Casaje's 1987 "Editoryal" war as Ceferino Concepcion's 1987 Batang Hiroshima (Hiroshima Child); overseas workers' issues as in Ricky Lee's 1992 "D.H." (short for "Domestic Helper").
