= Manuel Bautista =

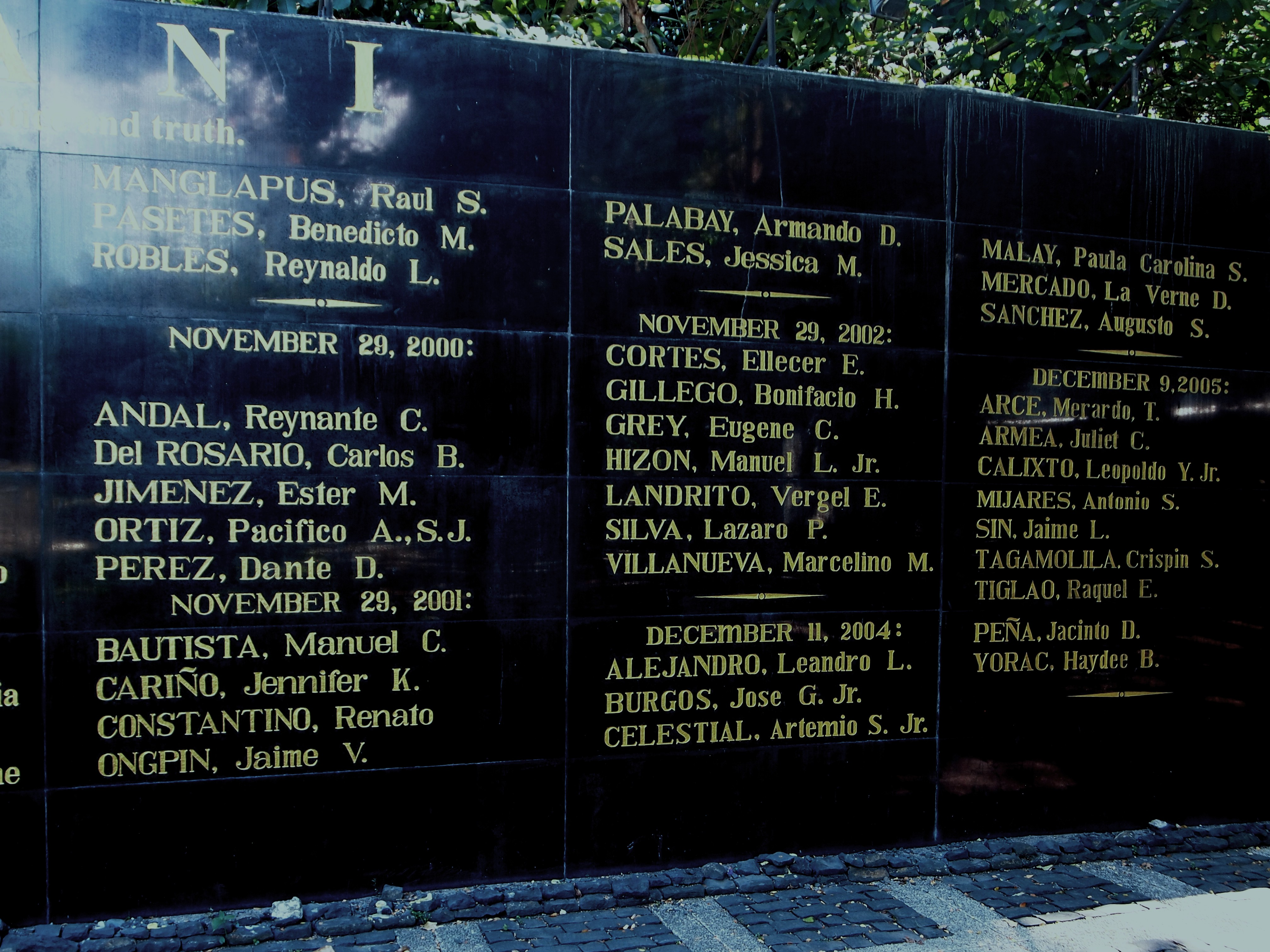
- Detail of the Wall of Remembrance at the Bantayog ng mga Bayani, showing names from the 2001 batch of Bantayog Honorees, including that of Manuel Bautista.
- Born: Manuel Candelaria Bautista; July 25, 1946; Manila, Philippines
- Died: September 2, 1976 (aged 30); Tagkawayan, Quezon, Philippines
- Education: University of the Philippines Los Baños (no degree)
- Awards: Honored at the Bantayog ng mga Bayani wall of remembrance

Manuel Candelaria Bautista (July 25, 1946 – September 2, 1976) was a Filipino student leader, campus journalist, and activist best known for his contributions as a student leader at the University of the Philippines Los Baños during the martial law dictatorship of former President Ferdinand Marcos.

== Early life ==
Bautista was born in Manila on 25 July 1946 to parents Uldarico and Susan Bautista. He finished his elementary school studies at Pura V. Kalaw Elementary School in Project 4, Quezon City, and went to high school at the University of the Philippines High School, in Diliman, Quezon City.

== Life at the University of the Philippines College of Agriculture ==
He enrolled in a bachelor's degree course in Economics at the University of the Philippines College of Agriculture (UPCA), which would eventually become the University of the Philippines Los Baños. Active in campus politics, he was first elected to the student council of the UPCA, and later as a representative to the University of the Philippines student council. As student councilor at the UPCA, he helped spearhead the establishment of the Textbook Exchange and Rental Center (TERC), an institution which continues to serve the UPLB student body to this day. He also wrote for the college paper, the "Aggie Green and Gold."

As representative to the UP student council, he was one of several student whistleblowers who published an exposé in the Philippine Collegian, forcing the UP College of Forestry to back out of a 1969 project with a foreign chemical company involving the testing of Agent Orange, a defoliant used by US Forces in the Vietnam War.

Bautista was in his senior year when Marcos first suspended the writ of habeas corpus in 1971—a landmark event which led to the radicalization of many students against Marcos, and a precursor to the declaration of Martial Law a year later. In protest, Bautista became one of many students who left the university in protest, and joined the underground movement against the Marcos regime.

== Life in the underground ==
When he "went underground" in 1971, Bautista's first responsibility was to run an underground newspaper and publishing network in the Southern Tagalog provinces of Laguna and Quezon. This task became increasingly difficult after Marcos imposed martial law in 1972, with Bautista having to hide their editorial office and sources of materials, as well as ensuring safe and effective distribution of the newspapers.

Marcos forces eventually found and arrested Bautista in November 1973, imprisoning him at Camp Vicente Lim in Canlubang, Laguna. But he escaped less than two months later with 12 other political prisoners. He then rejoined the underground and organized yet another underground newspaper - this time in the Quezon-Bicol area.

== Death and legacy ==
In September 1976, Bautista was killed at age 30 after he and a number of associates from the underground had an encounter with Marcos forces in Tagkawayan, Quezon. His companions report having taken his body and buried him in an unmarked grave.

In 2001, 15 years after Marcos's removal from power, Bautista was honored by having his name engraved on the wall of remembrance at the Bantayog ng mga Bayani, which honors martyrs and heroes from all political leanings and walks of life, as long as they fought against the Marcos dictatorship. He was honored that year alongside activists Jennifer Cariño, Armando "Mandrake" Palabay, and Jessica Sales, as well as entrepreneur Jaime V. Ongpin, and historian Renato Constantino.

== See also ==
- San Fernando, La Union
- Armando Palabay
- Jessica Sales
- Renato Constantino
- Jaime V. Ongpin
