= Armando Palabay =

Filipino student activist (1953–1974)

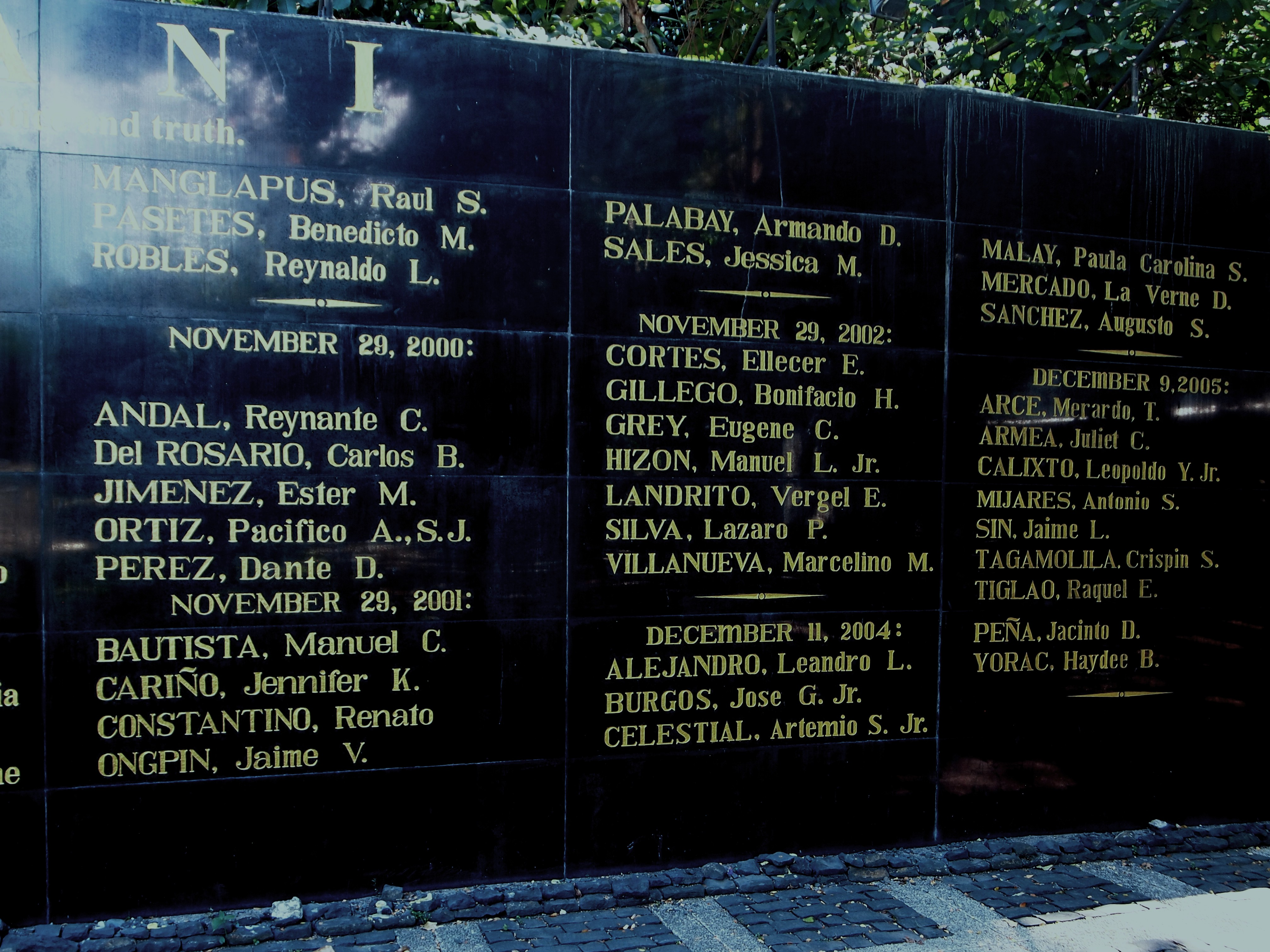
- Detail of the Wall of Remembrance at the Bantayog ng mga Bayani, photographed on November 15, 2018, showing names from the 2001 batch of Bantayog honorees, including that of Armando Palabay.
- Born: Armando Ducusin Palabay; February 18, 1953; San Fernando, La Union, Philippines
- Died: November 27, 1974 (aged 21); Sallapadan, Abra, Philippines
- Education: University of the Philippines Diliman (no degree)
- Occupation: Student activist
- Awards: Honored at the Bantayog ng mga Bayani wall of remembrance

Armando "Mandrake" Ducusin Palabay (February 18, 1953 – November 27, 1974) was a Filipino student leader and activist from San Fernando, La Union. He is best known for his work in organizing anti-Marcos campaigns during the first quarter storm and the early days of martial law under Ferdinand Marcos. He was killed for the anti-Marcos cause while doing community work among the indigenous Tingguian people of Sallapadan, Abra, in 1974, and was honored in 2001 by having his name inscribed on the Wall of the Remembrance at the Philippines' Bantayog ng mga Bayani (Monument of Heroes), which honors the martyrs and heroes who fought the dictatorship.

== Early life and education ==
Palabay was born in San Fernando, La Union - the eighth of nine children of Francisco F. Palabay and Felicidad F. Ducusin. La Union is a predominantly Ilocano province, so the Palabay siblings grew up in a community with strong ethnic and regionalistic loyalties to Ferdinand Marcos, whose home province of Ilocos Norte is also part of the Ilocos region. He took his elementary school studies at the San Fernando Community School in his home city, and then went to high school at the La Union High School (now the La Union National High School, LUNHS). Through occasional news reports, he and his elder brother Romulo began becoming aware of the abuses of the Marcos regime, which led to them having regular discussions at their house with friends after school.

== College at UP Diliman and community work in La Union ==
Palabay became more involved in political activism when he was accepted into the Bachelor of Science degree program in Economics at the University of the Philippines Diliman. He became a member of the Student Cultural Association of UP (SCAUP) and of activist theater group Panday Sining.

He was particularly keen on activist drama - helping to organize and present street plays, leading in the singing of protest songs and the recitation of poetry in an effort to build awareness of the injustices inherent to Philippine society under the Marcos regime. After the political turbulence of 1970 and 1971 - which saw the FQS Protests, the Diliman Commune, the Plaza Miranda Bombing, and the suspension of the writ - the Palabay Brothers decided to take a break from their studies and go back home to San Fernando. There they enrolled in a local college where they continued efforts to build awareness of the abuses of the Marcos dictatorship. The Palabay brothers were in La Union when Ferdinand Marcos announced on September 23, 1972 that he had placed the Philippines under Martial Law.

== Martial law torture and return to UP ==
Soon after the announcement of Martial Law, Armando and Romulo Palabay were both picked up by Marcos forces, and detained for half a year at Camp Olivas in Pampanga where they were both subjected to torture. Armando was eventually released, after which he went back to study at UP for a semester.

== Community activism in Abra ==
Finding the Diliman campus in tumult, Palabay was inspired to do direct activist work with peasant communities. He left the campus and began to do countryside organizing among the indigenous Itneg and Tinggian peoples of southern Abra province. Palabay learned the Tinggian language and studied herbal medicine and acupuncture so that he would be able to offer services to the community. Earning a reputation for his sense of humor, he also began learning about farming in an effort to better understand the daily difficulties faced by peasant farmers.

== Death and legacy ==
A year after Palabay began living among the Tinggians, he and a group of fellow activists had an encounter with the paramilitary troops called the Civilian Home Defense Forces. Palabay and his companions were all killed and buried in a grave somewhere on the banks of the Abra River. The grave has never been found and none of the bodies have ever been recovered. Palabay was only 21 when he died. In 2001, Palabay was honored by having his name engraved on the wall of remembrance at the Bantayog ng mga Bayani, which honors martyrs and heroes from all political leanings and walks of life, as long as they fought against the Marcos dictatorship. He was honored that year alongside activists Manuel Bautista, Jennifer Cariño, and Jessica Sales, as well as entrepreneur Jaime V. Ongpin, and historian Renato Constantino.

In 2008, the Bantayog ng mga Bayani further highlighted Palabay's story, citing him as "typical" of the "young ones" who often became martyrs in the fight against the abuses of the Marcos dictatorship.

== See also ==
- San Fernando, La Union
- Manuel Bautista
- Jessica Sales
- Renato Constantino
- Jaime V. Ongpin
