= Gerry Faustino =

Filipino student leader and activist

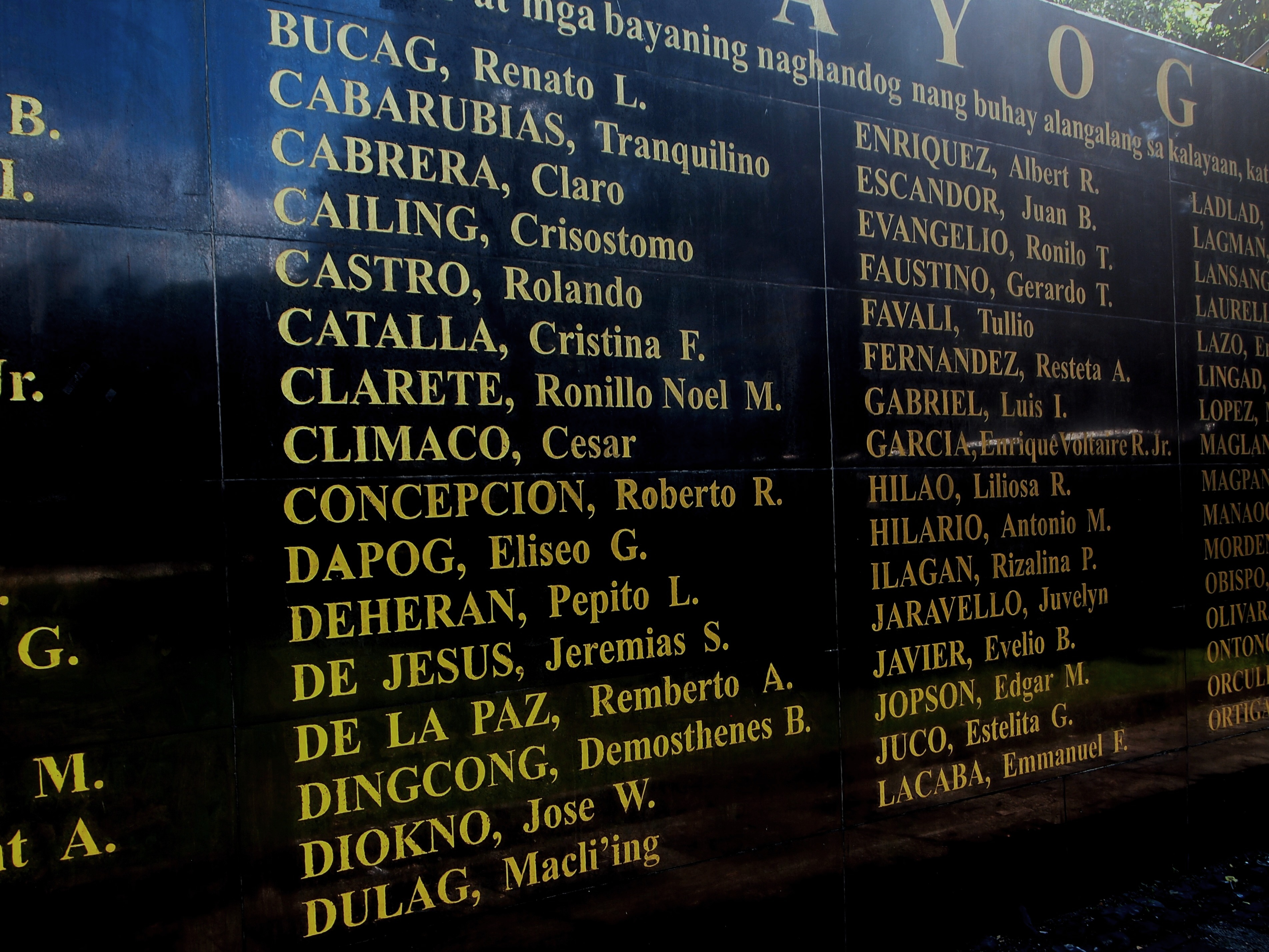
- Detail of the Wall of Remembrance at the Bantayog ng mga Bayani, showing names from the first batch of Bantayog Honorees, including that of Gerry Faustino
- Born: Gerardo T. Faustino; September 24, 1955
- Disappeared: July 31, 1977 (aged 21); Makati
- Status: Missing for 49 years and 1 month
- Education: University of the Philippines Los Baños
- Occupation: Activist
- Awards: Honored at the Bantayog ng mga Bayani wall of remembrance

Gerardo T. Faustino (September 24, 1955 – disappeared July 31, 1977) was a Filipino student leader and activist from the University of the Philippines Los Baños who is best known as one of the most prominent desaparecidos of the Marcos Martial Law era in the Philippines.

Faustino is one of heroes honored by the University of the Philippines Los Baños in its 'Hagdan ng Malayang Kamalayan' memorial, and his name is inscribed on the Wall of Remembrance at the Bantayog ng mga Bayani, a memorial that honors martyrs and heroes who fought the dictatorship.

== Student life at the University of the Philippines Los Baños ==
Gerry Faustino first enrolled as a freshman at the University of the Philippines in Los Baños (UPLB) in 1973, taking up a Bachelor of Science degree in Agriculture only a year after the University of the Philippines College of Agriculture was elevated as the newly created UP System's first autonomous campus. It was also the year after Ferdinand Marcos' declaration of Martial Law in September 1972.

He soon joined the UP Student Catholic Action - Los Baños (UPSCA-LB), one of the few student organizations still recognized by the university after most such organizations were banned after Martial Law. Already known for being politically aware, he demonstrated leadership potential by participating in the UPSCA's extension programs. He was eventually elected as a representative to the UPLB student conference, a body that had been formed by the UPLB studentry to push for the restoration of the UPLB Student Council, which had been abolished after the proclamation of martial law.

== Disappearance ==
Gerry Faustino was 21 years old on July 31, 1977, when he was kidnapped with nine other UPLB activists in Makati. The group eventually became known as the “Southern Tagalog 10,” whose disappearance is considered the most prominent case of abduction under martial law.

Only the body of Modesto Sison, one of the ten activists, was found, although the Philippine military later claimed that three of woman activists—Rizalina Ilagan, Cristina Catalla and Jessica Sales—had been killed in an encounter in Mauban, Quezon. No clues about the whereabouts of the other six activists have ever been found.

== See also ==
- List of kidnappings
- List of people who disappeared mysteriously: post-1970
