= Southern Tagalog 10 =

Group of abducted Filipino activists

The Southern Tagalog 10 was a group of activists abducted and "disappeared" in 1977 during martial law in the Philippines under Proclamation No. 1081 issued by President Ferdinand E. Marcos. Of the 10 university students and professors who were abducted, only three, Virgilio Silva, Salvador Panganiban, and Modesto Sison, "surfaced" later after being killed by suspected agents of the state. Two of those who surfaced were apparently summarily executed. The rest were never found.

== Background ==
The victims, most of them in their early twenties, all belonged to a network of community organizations in the Southern Tagalog region. They were abducted in late July 1977 at the Makati Medical Center in Metro Manila.

The incident is believed to be the single biggest case of involuntary disappearance during martial law. Bonifacio Ilagan, brother of one of the victims and vice chair of Samahan ng Ex-Detainees Laban sa Detensyon at Aresto (an organization that works for the welfare of political detainees), described the abduction as "the single biggest case of involuntary disappearance and summary execution perpetrated by the Armed Forces of the Philippines in the entire history of the Marcos martial law in the Philippines."

== Members ==
The ten individuals known as the Southern Tagalog 10 are:

- Cristina Catalla
- Gerardo "Gerry" Faustino
- Rizalina Ilagan
- Ramon Jasul
- Salvador Panganiban
- Jessica Sales
- Emmanuel Salvacruz
- Virgilio Silva
- Modesto “Bong” Sison
- Erwin de la Torre

The names of Catalla, Faustino, Rizalina Ilagan, Jasul, Sales, and Sison are included on the Bantayog ng mga Bayani's Wall of Remembrance for martyrs and heroes of martial law.

== In popular culture ==
The play Pagsambang Bayan (People’s Worship), written by Bonifacio Ilagan, is dedicated to the members of the Southern Tagalog 10. It was first staged in September 1977 at the University of the Philippines (U.P.) by the U.P. Repertory Company under the direction of Behn Cervantes. Its staging led to the arrest of Cervantes and the play's musical director. The play won the Palihang Aurelio V. Tolentino and has since been performed hundreds of times. The Cultural Center of the Philippines (CCP) cites the play as a "major work in Philippine theater." A musical version of the play was staged in 2017 by director Joel Lamangan at the Polytechnic University of the Philippines and the CCP.

On television, actress Bianca Umali played Rizalina Ilagan in the GMA Network docudrama Alaala: A Martial Law Special, which first aired on September 17, 2017.

== See also ==
- Bantayog ng mga Bayani
