= Jessica Sales =

Filipina college professor and community organizer

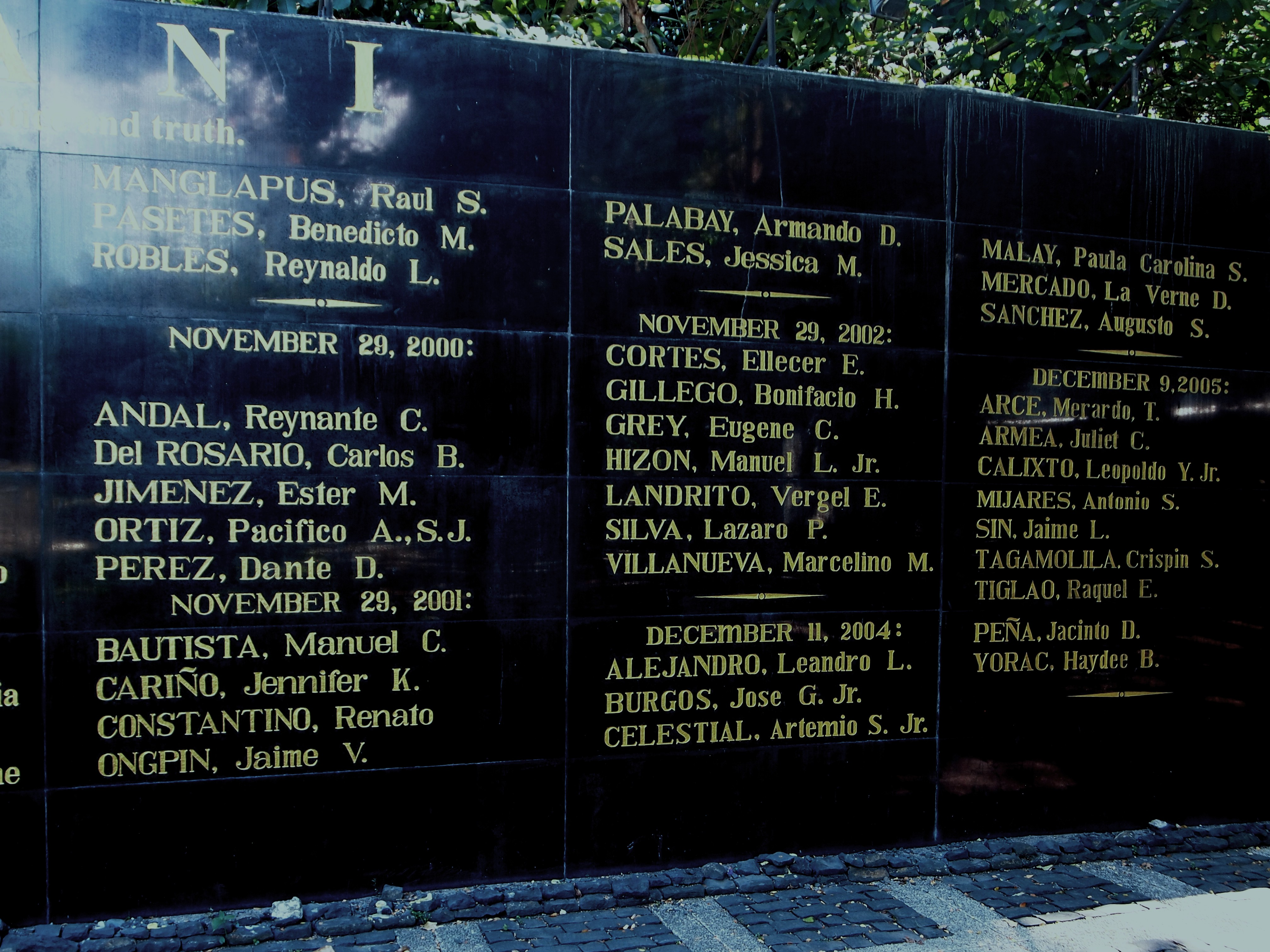
- Detail of the Wall of Remembrance at the Bantayog ng mga Bayani, showing names from the 2001 batch of Bantayog Honorees, including that of Jessica Sales
- Born: Jessica Mendez Sales; October 15, 1951; Manila, Philippines
- Disappeared: July 31, 1977 (aged 25); Makati, Philippines
- Education: Centro Escolar University (BS)
- Occupation: University professor
- Awards: Honored at the Bantayog ng mga Bayani wall of remembrance

Jessica Mendez Sales (October 15, 1951 – disappeared July 31, 1977) was a college professor and community organizer in the Philippines who disappeared during martial law under the dictatorship of Ferdinand Marcos. She was a founder of the university chapter of the Student Christian Movement of the Philippines at the University of the Philippines Los Baños.

Sales was arrested by state agents, at the age of 26, along with nine other activists working with community organizations in the Southern Tagalog region in the Philippines: Cristina Catalla, Gerardo "Gerry" Faustino, Rizalina Ilagan, Ramon Jasul, Salvador Panganiban, Emmanuel Salvacruz, Virgilio Silva, Modesto "Bong" Sison, and Erwin de la Torre. The group came to be known as the Southern Tagalog 10.

Sales' name is inscribed on the Bantayog ng mga Bayani Wall of Remembrance honoring martyrs and heroes of martial law.

== See also ==
- List of people who disappeared mysteriously: post-1970
