= Movement of Concerned Citizens for Civil Liberties =

Advocacy group in the Philippines

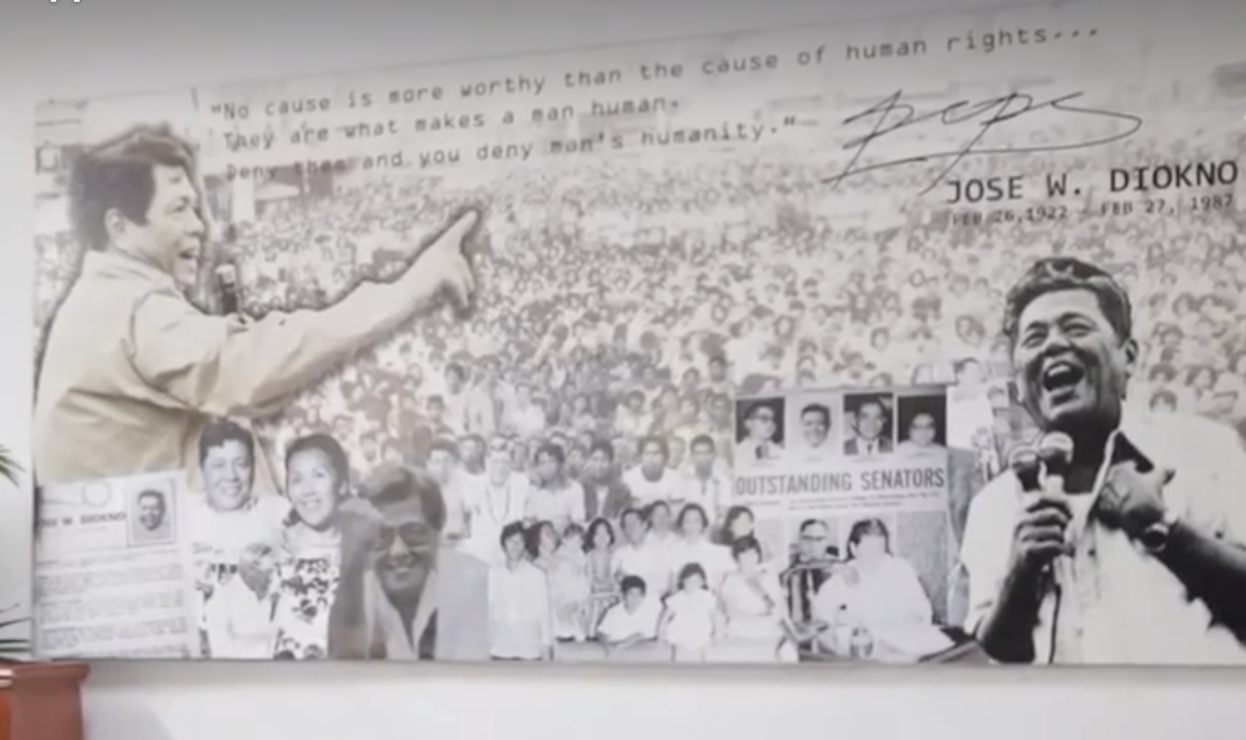
- Founder Sen. José W. Diokno
- Formation: 1971; 55 years ago
- Founder: José W. Diokno
- Type: Advocacy group
- Location: Philippines
- Methods: Mass demonstration

The Movement of Concerned Citizens for Civil Liberties (MCCCL /mˌsiːsiːsiːl/) is an advocacy coalition in the Philippines which was first formed under the leadership of José W. Diokno in 1971, as a response to the suspension of the Writ of Habeas Corpus in the wake of the Plaza Miranda bombing. It became well known for the series of rallies which it organized from 1971–72, especially the most massive one on September 21, 1972, hours before the imposition of martial law by the Marcos dictatorship.

The coalition was reconvened in 2005, and it continues to do advocacy work and lead the democratic movement in the Philippines today.

== 1971 establishment ==
With the Constitutional Convention occupying their attention from 1971 to 1973, statesmen and politicians opposed to the increasingly more-authoritarian administration of Ferdinand Marcos mostly focused their efforts on political efforts from within the halls of power. All this changed, however, with the Plaza Miranda Bombing at the Liberal Party Miting de Avance on August 21, 1971.

Ferdinand Marcos blamed communists for the bombing, and used it as a reason to suspend the writ of habeas corpus and have the military pick up prominent activists, such as KM's Luzvimindo David and MDP's Gary Olivar.

After the writ of habeas corpus was lifted, Diokno had concerns that Marcos could use this chance to declare martial law. Under Diokno's leadership, the Movement of Concerned Citizens for Civil Liberties (MCCCL) - "a broad alliance of civil libertarians, progressive Constitutional Convention delegates, students, professionals as well as workers" was formed to protest the controversial decision. As recounted by author and University of the Philippines Professor Petronilo Daroy: "The alliance had three basic demands: a) lift the writ of habeas corpus; b) release of political prisoners; and c) resist any plan by the Marcos government to declare martial law."

== September 21, 1972, rally ==
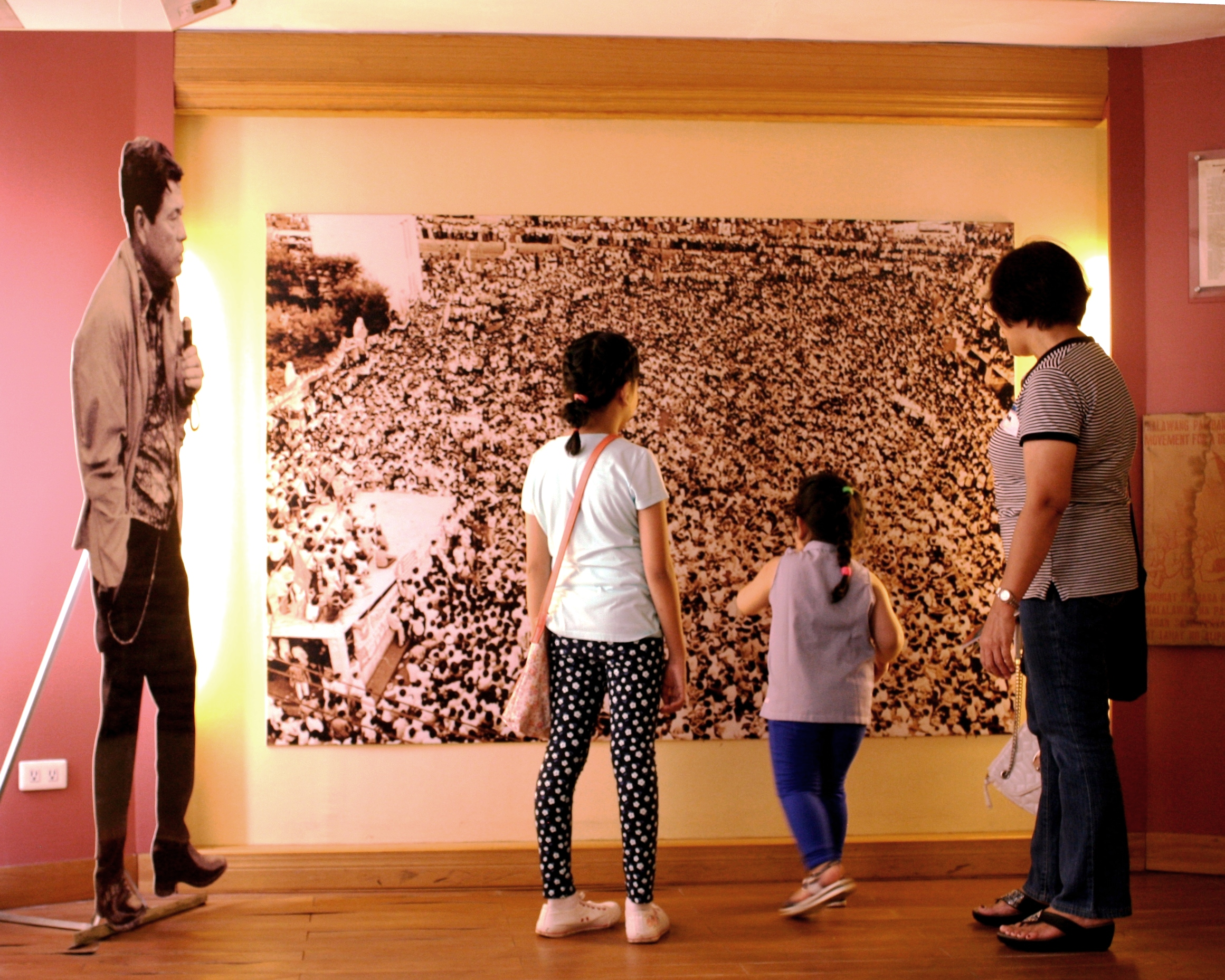
Visitors to the Bantayog ng mga Bayani, ponder the protest of 1972 while Sen. "Ka Pepe" Diokno, looks on.

The MCCCL's rallies are remembered for their scale, with the biggest one held on September 21, 1972 - just two days before Marcos' announcement of Martial Law - which was attended by as many as 50,000 people at Plaza Miranda. With a specific set of demands, the MCCCL rallies also marked one of the first and most successful events at bringing together "diverse groups such as those from the ‘Nat-Dem’ groups and the ‘Soc-Dem’ groups as well as various civic organizations." During the rally, many protested against the infamous "Oplan Sagittarius", a secret plan to declare martial law.

After the rally Marcos reacted with fear of deposition and finished signing Proclamation No. 1081 at 8:00 p.m., which would declare nationwide martial law. The same time next evening, Defense Minister Juan Ponce Enrile was told to exit his car beside an electrical post near Wack-Wack village in Mandaluyong, on the way to his private subdivision in Dasmariñas Village. Another car approached beside the previous vehicle, and gunmen then exited the car and fired multiple bullets at Enrile's vehicle. Marcos would make a fraudulent claim that was quickly debunked by historians that due to these terrorist attacks planned by his opposition he would have to declare martial law. He would make the television announcement on September 23, 1972, at 7:15 p.m.

== Martial law ==
Many of the activists who were active in the MCCCL, were arrested by the Marcos dictatorship when Martial Law was imposed. Diokno himself was one of the 400 individuals on Marcos' "priority list" who were arrested in the early morning hours of September 23, 1972 - before Marcos even announced Martial Law that evening. To make sure citizens forgot about the September 21 rally, he declared September 21 to be "National Thanksgiving Day", the start of his new era of dictatorship. The unintended effect was that many became perplexed as to the true date of the declaration of martial law, as the public announcement was actually on September 23, two days after he signed Proclamation No. 1081. Diokno would later create the Free Legal Assistance Group or FLAG, the first organization of human rights lawyers, to battle martial law and stop Marcos's nefarious plans.

== 21st Century Revival and Return ==
While the coalition was effectively dissolved when martial law was implemented in late September 1972, it was reconvened a year after the 2004 Philippine presidential election during the Gloria Arroyo Administration when multiple journalist deaths were reported in the first quarter of the year and talks of anti-terrorism bills emerged, which would label presidential critics as terrorists. The MCCCL has since continued to do advocacy work for democracy and civil rights in the Philippines.

== See also ==
- José W. Diokno
