= Rizalina Ilagan =

Filipina anti-martial law activist

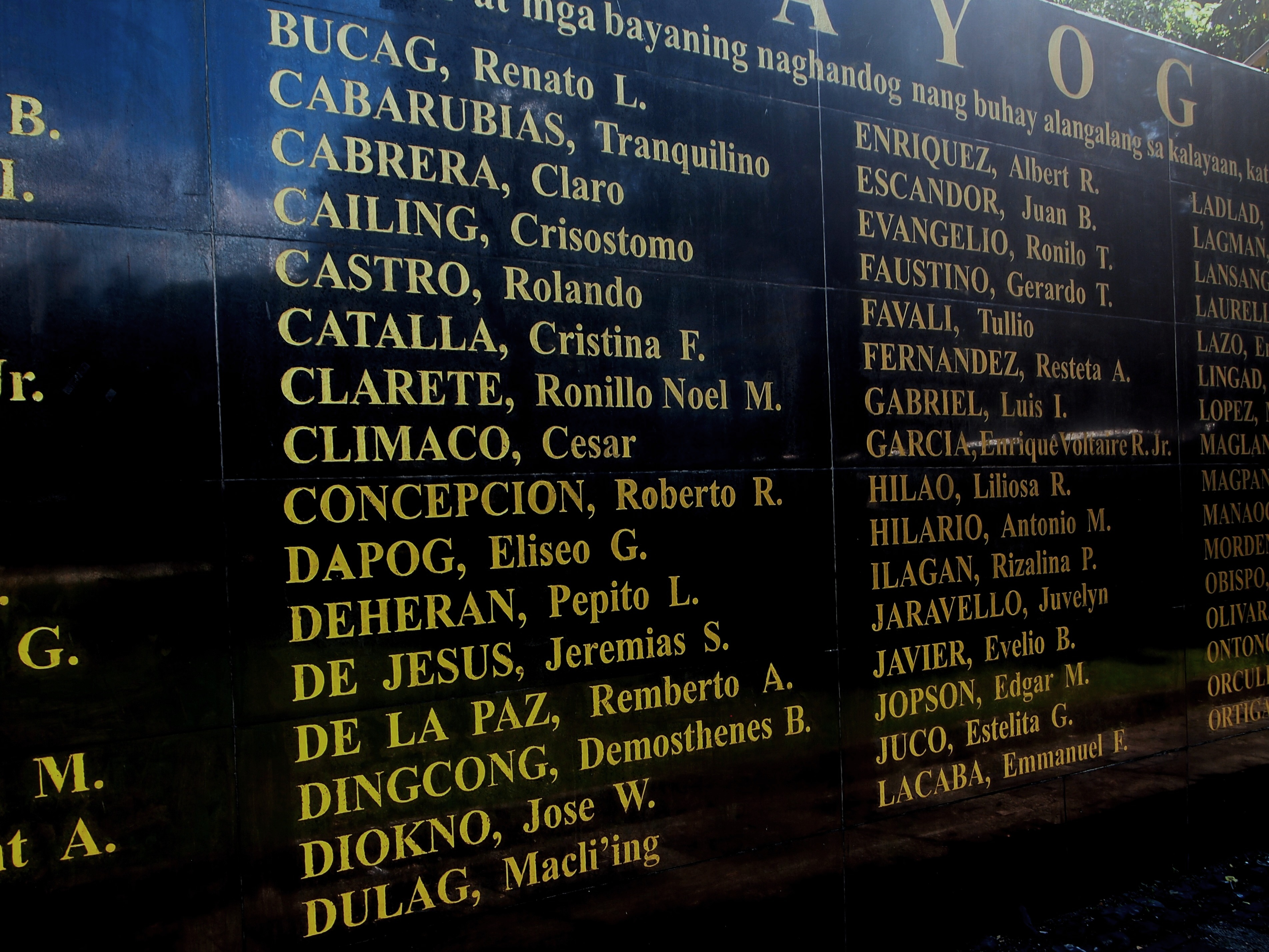
- Detail of the Wall of Remembrance at the Bantayog ng mga Bayani, showing names from the first batch of Bantayog Honorees, including that of Rizalina Ilagan
- Born: Rizalina Parabuac Ilagan; June 19, 1954; Los Baños, Laguna, Philippines
- Disappeared: July 31, 1977 (aged 23); Makati, Philippines
- Education: University of the Philippines Los Baños (no degree)
- Occupation: Activist
- Relatives: Bonifacio Ilagan (brother)
- Awards: Honored at the Bantayog ng mga Bayani wall of remembrance

Rizalina "Lina" Parabuac Ilagan (born June 19, 1954—disappeared on July 31, 1977) was an anti-martial law activist who belonged to a network of community organizations in the Southern Tagalog region in the Philippines.

She was abducted by state security agents and disappeared on July 31, 1977, at the Makati Medical Center in Metro Manila, with nine other activists in what is believed to be the single biggest case of involuntary disappearance during Ferdinand Marcos’ martial law in the Philippines.

The group, consisting of university students and professors working as community organizers in Southern Tagalog, later came to be known as the Southern Tagalog 10.

Ilagan's name is inscribed on the Bantayog ng mga Bayani Wall of Remembrance, which honors martyrs and heroes of martial law. She is one of the heroes honored on the University of the Philippines Los Baños 'Hagdan ng Malayang Kamalayan' memorial.

== Biography ==
As a student, Ilagan was always at the top of her class. She directed plays in high school (and won best director) and wrote for the school paper. She also attended conferences held by youth organizations, such as the Future Farmers of the Philippines. She became an activist and joined the local chapter of the militant youth group Kabataang Makabayan (KM) in her senior year in high school.

She entered the University of the Philippines in Los Baños and became active in the theater group Tambuli under director Leo Rimando. She became the Southern Tagalog coordinator of KM's Panday Sining theater organization, which staged plays depicting the problems of Philippine society.

She left the university when martial law was declared in 1972 and worked full-time organizing communities in the underground resistance to the dictatorship. She also worked as a staff member for an underground newsletter in Southern Tagalog. It was at this time that military intelligence personnel began pursuing her and other activists working in Southern Tagalog.

On July 31, 1977, Ilagan and her two companions, Jessica Sales and Cristina Catalla, were abducted on their way to a meeting at the Makati Medical Center. They were to meet fellow community organizers Gerardo "Gerry" Faustino, Modesto Sison, Ramon Jasul, Emmanuel Salvacruz, Salvador Panganiban, Virgilio Silva, and Erwin de la Torre, all of whom were also abducted. Sison's body was later found in Lucena City, Quezon province. Silva and Panganiban's bodies were found in a ravine in Tagaytay City, Cavite. Ilagan and the rest were never found.

Ilagan is recognized as a martyr and hero of martial law and her name has been inscribed on the Bantayog ng mga Bayani Wall of Remembrance. The arts festival Pista Rizalina of the Cultural Center of the Philippines was named in her honor.

== In popular culture and mass media ==
The play Pagsambang Bayan is dedicated to Ilagan and other members of the Southern Tagalog 10. It was written by Ilagan's brother Bonifacio Ilagan and first staged in September 1977 by director Behn Cervantes and the University of the Philippines Repertory Company. The staging of the play led to the arrest of Cervantes and the play's musical director.

The Cultural Center of the Philippines organized Pista Rizalina: A Festival of Arts and Ideas in honor of Ilagan. It ran from September 8 to 24, 2017, and featured nine plays on freedom and human rights. It also featured films, documentaries, a public forum, art exhibits, and musical performances.

Actress Bianca Umali played Rizalina Ilagan in the GMA Network television special Alaala: A Martial Law Special, which first aired on September 17, 2017. Alaala won the Gold Camera Award in the docudrama category of the 2018 U.S. International Film and Video Festival.

== See also ==
- Bantayog ng mga Bayani
- List of people who disappeared mysteriously: post-1970
- Southern Tagalog 10
