= Panday Sining =

Youth mass organization based in the Philippines

- Predecessor: Cultural bureaus of Kabataang Makabayan and later Anakbayan
- Type: Cultural youth mass organization
- Methods: Protest art

Panday Sining (transl. Artsmith; abbreviated as PS) is national-democratic militant cultural youth mass organization based in the Philippines. It is part of the broader Bagong Alyansang Makabayan, a far-left alliance in the Philippines.

The organization creates various protest art forms, including concerts, visual art, and street art, with the aim of exposing the Philippine government and expressing the causes and struggles of marginalized sectors in the country and abroad. Panday Sining provide educational discussions and other fora relating on Philippine art and society.

== History ==
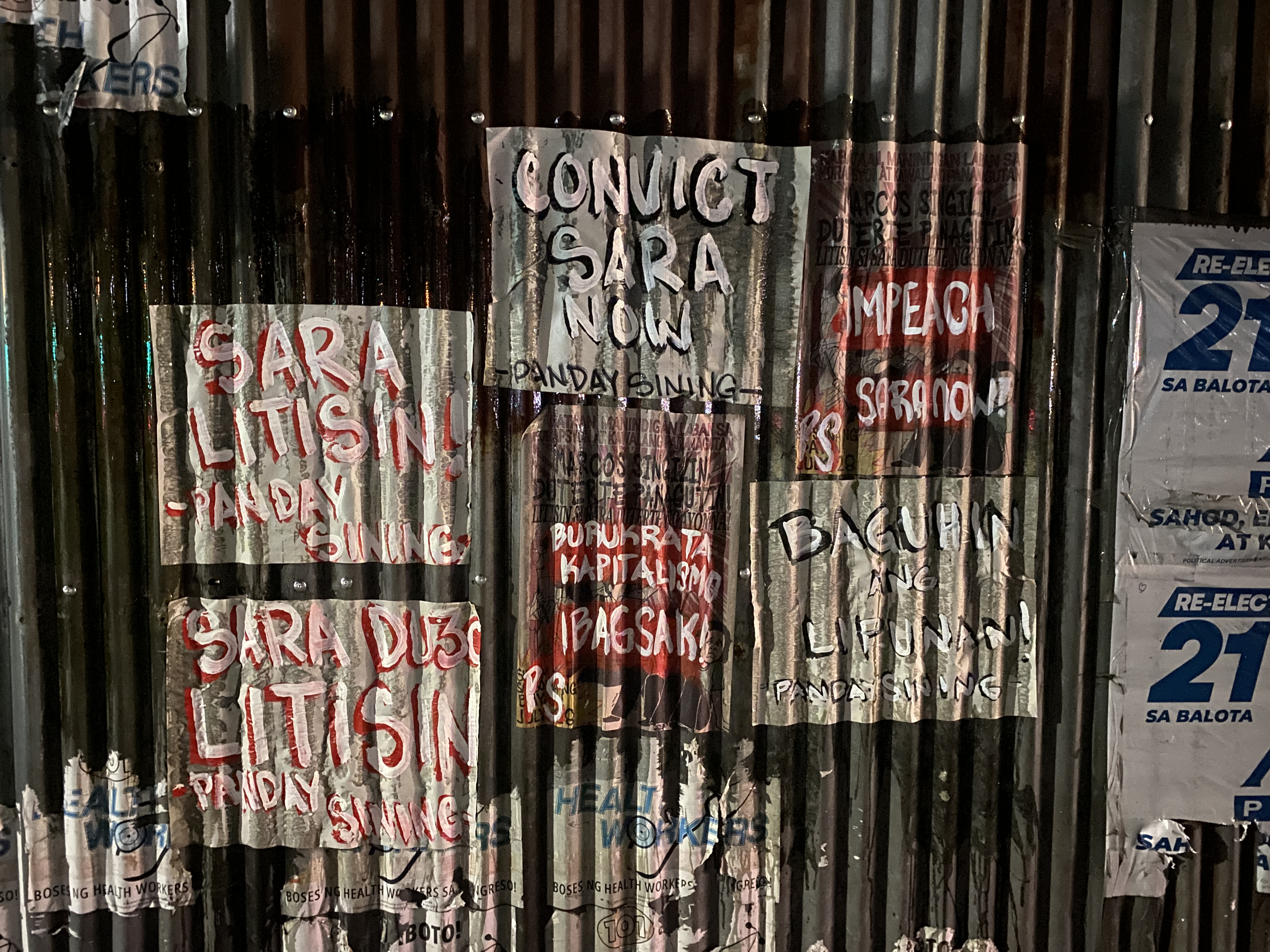
Posters of Panday Sining calling for the conviction or impeachment of Sara Duterte

Panday Sining emerged as the cultural bureau of Kabataang Makabayan in 1970 and eventually, of Anakbayan, then became its own organization.

During the martial law-era, the organization was one of the most prominent theater groups which President Ferdinand Marcos Sr. cited as one of the major security threats as a reason for imposing martial law on September 21, 1971. Other famous mass theater groups back then include Gintong Silahis, Tanghalang Bayan, and Samahang Kamanyang. Bonifacio Ilagan became one of its founders. During that time, the organized tours around the country to perform nationalist plays inspired by the experiences of people at that time.

Other prominent PS members during the martial law-era include Eman Lacaba, Merardo Arce, Leo Alte, Romulo Palabay, Armando Palabay, and Rizalina Ilagan, Bonifacio's sister. Rizalina became the group's Southern Tagalog coordinator, conducting street plays and musicals. Armando Palabay engaged in drama, street plays, and protest songs. Panday Sining figured during the First Quarter Storm.

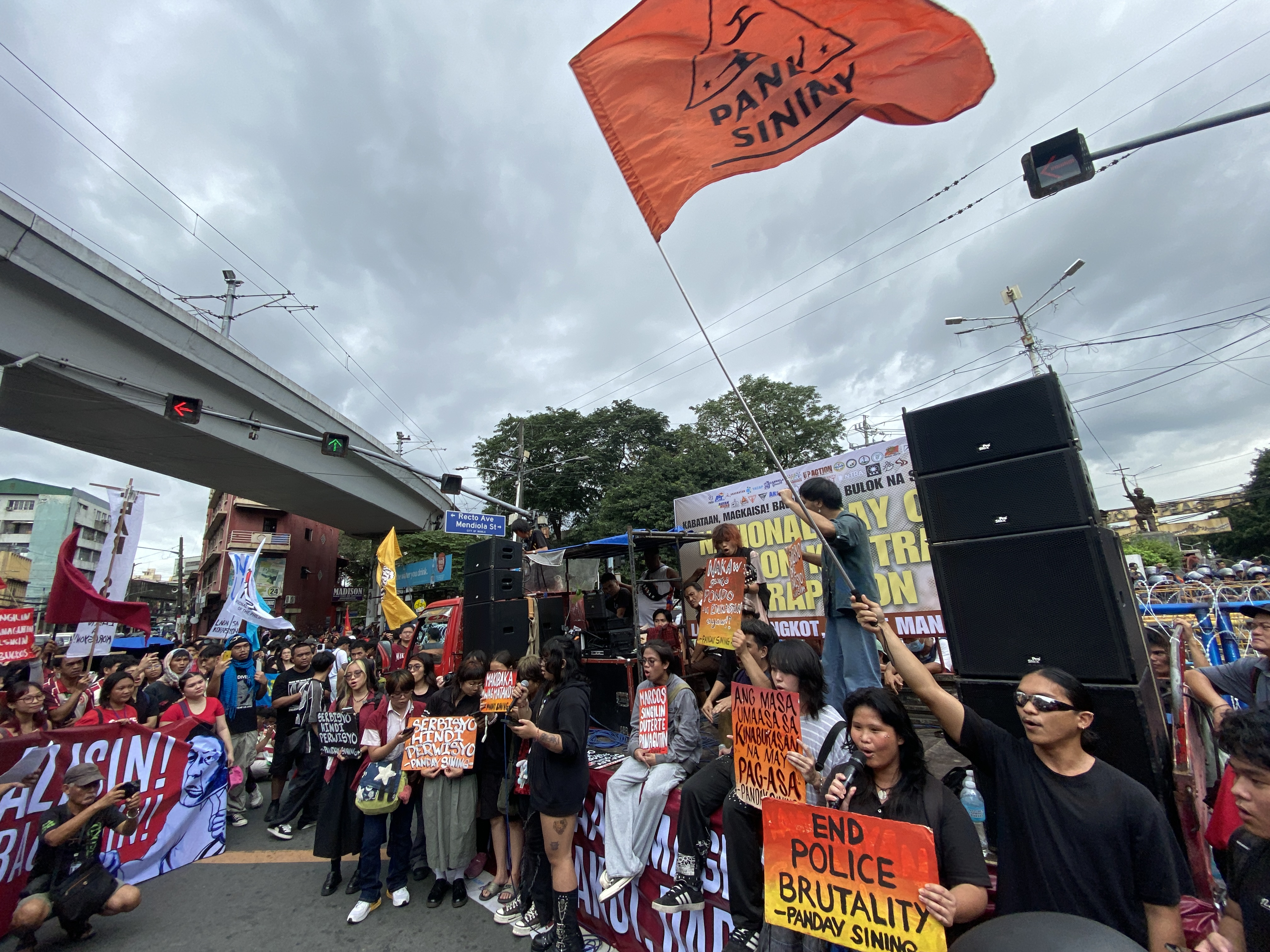
Panday Sining performing during the Philippine anti-corruption protests, October 2025.

In November 2019, Panday Sining went under fire for painting protest slogans along the streets of Manila with messages "Presyo, Ibaba! Sahod, Itaas!" (lit. 'Lower the Prices, Raise the Wages!') and "US-China, Layas!" (lit. 'US-China, Get Out!'). Particularly, city mayor Isko Moreno cited the slogans at the Lagusnilad underpass near Manila City Hall. Moreno warned the cultural artists "Kapag nahuli ko kayo, ipadidila ko sa inyo ito.” (If I catch you, I will make you wipe that off with your tongue.). In response, the organization asserted that their action was protest art, not mere vandalism, saying "To the public: sorry for the inconvenience, but the matter and issues at hand are urgent. Left and right, ordinary people are being killed or jailed for criticizing this corrupt and fascist government...The space for peaceful and democratic speech is already being compromised by the regime...That is why Panday Sining, a cultural organization of the youth, conducted its Graffiesta as a response to these worsening economic and political state of the nation." The organization urged that these actions were avenues in raising awareness and spaces for critical dialogue.

On November 30, four members of the organization were arrested by Manila police because of said street vandalism. The organization was declared as 'persona non grata' by Manila City Council on December 6, 2019.

During the protest against the inauguration of Ferdinand "Bongbong" Marcos Jr., Panday Sining recreated the mock coffin thrown towards President Marcos Sr. in January 1970 after his fifth State of the Nation Address. The group said that the coffin symbolizes the “death of democracy and the suppression of the Filipino people’s rights with the return of a Marcos and a Duterte in Malacañang.”
