= Anakbayan =

Philippine left-wing and national democratic youth organisation

- Chairperson: Mhing Gomez
- Vice-Chairperson: Lance Alba
- Secretary General: Kae Calicdan
- Treasurer: Cleo Castillo
- Founded: 30 November 1998
- Headquarters: Metro Manila
- Membership: More than 20,000
- Ideology: National Democracy
- Colours
- Mother party: Bagong Alyansang Makabayan
- International affiliation: International League of Peoples' Struggle
- Newspaper: Tinig ng Kabataang Makabayan

Anakbayan (transl. Children of the People; abbreviated as AB) is an international national democratic militant youth organization based in the Philippines. It is part of the broader Bagong Alyansang Makabayan, a multisectoral organization in the country.

== Ideology ==
Anakbayan subscribes to National Democracy, a Filipino nationalist ideology based on a Marxist–Leninist–Maoist perspective pledging to oppose foreign imperialism, landlordism, monopolistic capitalism, and corrupt government officials, with the Philippine Democratic Revolution to address these ills. Anakbayan prioritizes living wages, land reform, expanded social programs and public education, and legal rights.

== History ==
=== Background ===
Formed on Bonifacio Day (30 November) 1998, Anakbayan unites Filipino youth aged 13 to 35 from different backgrounds to promote National Democracy, especially in the Philippines. They believe that the country is not truly free or democratic and seek to make real the democratic rights of the people.

ManilaToday claims Anakbayan draws inspiration from the revolutionary movement of the Katipunan and the influential martial-law era youth organization Kabataang Makabayan. Issues within the National Democratic Movement during the 1990s led to the formation of a youth organization that tackles social issues in the Philippines.

=== Early years ===
For the National Democratic Movement to form a comprehensive youth organization, a National Organizing Committee was formed by members of League of Filipino Students (LFS), as well as other activists from University of the Philippines, Polytechnic University of the Philippines, and University of the East. The committee held its conferences in Del Pan Sports Complex, Tondo, Manila that started on November 28, 1998, through the help of the community and League of Tondo Youth. Youth delegates came from different regions across the Philippines. Anakbayan was formally established on November 30, in commemoration of the 135th birthday of Andrés Bonifacio, co-founder of the Katipunan, and the 34th anniversary of the Kabataang Makabayan. As the League of Tondo Youth merged with newly established organization, Anakbayan's first members also came from LFS, Student Christian Movement of the Philippines (SCMP), Center for Nationalist Studies, among other progressive youth organizations.

Anakbayan was participative of the movement, called Estrada Resign Youth Movement, to oust Philippine President Joseph "Erap" Estrada, describing him as "anti-youth", especially with budget cuts on the education sector. The movement culminated in People Power II, in which Anakbayan was instrumental in the participation of about 200,000 youth against Estrada. The organization popularized the call, “Sobra nang pahirap, patalsikin si Erap!” (Too much oppression, oust Erap!) which reverberated nationwide.

=== Post-EDSA II ===
During the early administration of President Gloria Macapagal Arroyo, a youth initiative called Youth Movement for Justice and Meaningful Change, composed of Anakbayan, LFS, SCMP, College Editors' Guild of the Philippines, and National Union of Students of the Philippines met at the office of Anakbayan in Padre Noval, Sampaloc, Manila, to discuss plans to advance the interests of the Filipino youth. Talks were made due to the disillusionment brought by the new administration. Eventually, these talks culminated in the formation of Anak ng Bayan Youth Party (Kabataan Partylist) on June 19, 2001, coinciding with the birthday of José Rizal. Anakbayan also campaigned against President Macapagal-Arroyo, forming Youth Dare or Youth Demanding Arroyo's Removal, a broad alliance that campaigned for the ouster of the president.

Born out of criticisms against globalization and the effects of neoliberalism, specifically inspired by the 1999 Seattle WTO protests, Filipino students in Washington organized the first chapter of Anakbayan in the United States, Anakbayan-Seattle. Established on November 30, 2002, the Seattle chapter inspired other Filipino-American youth to form chapters which include New York-New Jersey, Chicago, Hawaii, Los Angeles, San Diego, Silicon Valley, and East Bay Area. Between 2011 and 2012, the New York-New Jersey chapters split into individual chapters. They are collectively grouped under Anakbayan-USA

During 2012, Vencer Crisostomo, then-national chairperson, said the Noynoying poses reflected how Aquino had done nothing to cushion the impact of or prevent the increase in oil prices and tuition rates. He defined Noynoying as "when you do nothing when in fact you have something to do." Also at the same time, they barged inside a press conference of Akbayan political party and calling it a "fake partylist" due to Akbayan's alliance with the Aquino administration.

In 2015, Anakbayan called for the resignation of President Benigno Aquino III. According to Crisostomo, "We no longer want a government ruled by a corrupt, liar, US puppet, haciendero brat. Game over na, Noynoy. Time to step down." Over a hundred other youth and student organizations have called for his resignation. On February 27, thousands of students in Manila and other cities staged a walk-out against tuition increases and other education issues. Specifically for state and local universities and colleges, Anakbayan expressed dissent against socialized tuition schemes, instead of free education. Students in Manila culminated in Mendiola.

=== Duterte administration ===
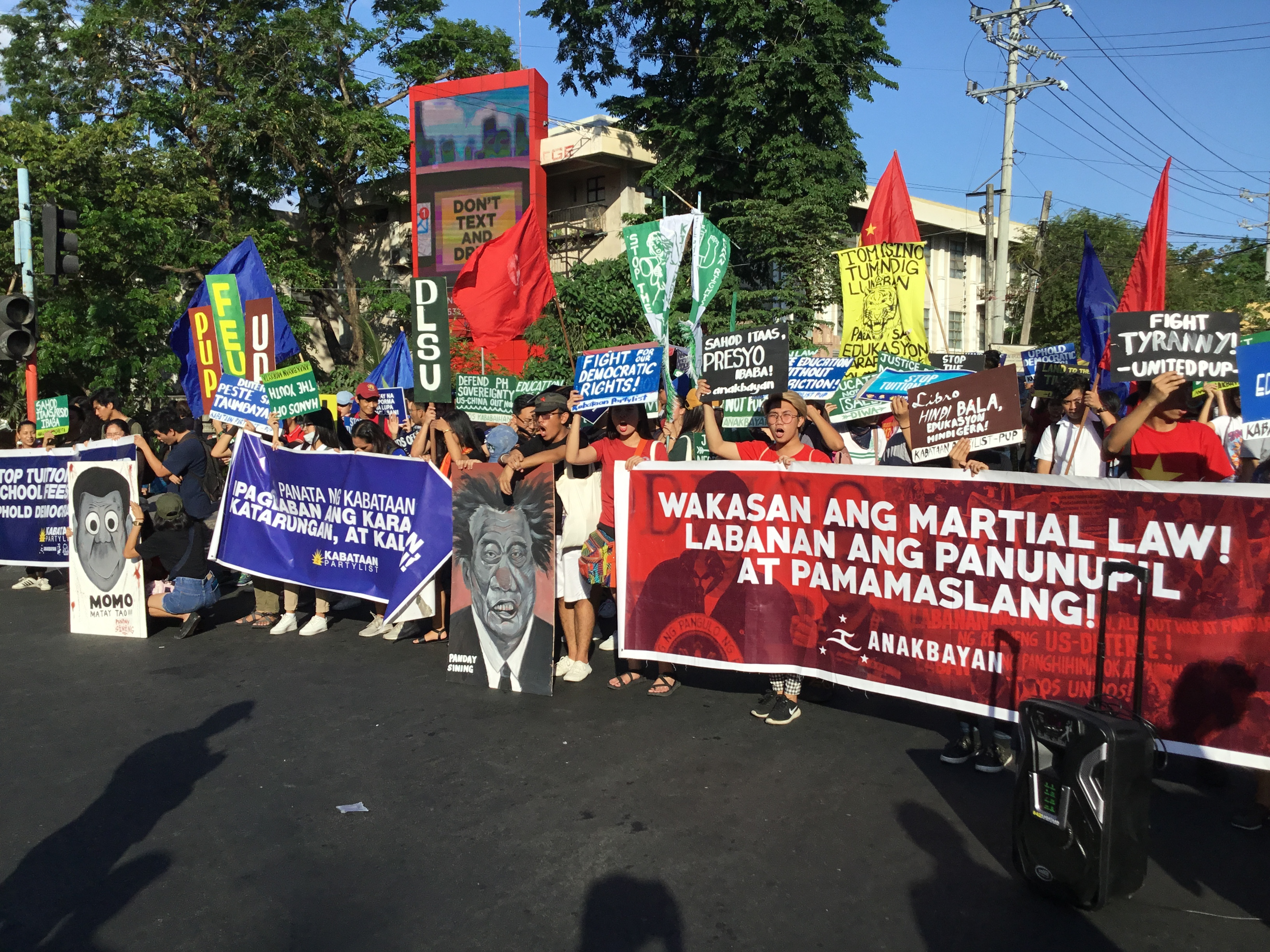
A student protest by Anakbayan and other youth groups held on April 5, 2019, condemning martial law under President Duterte.

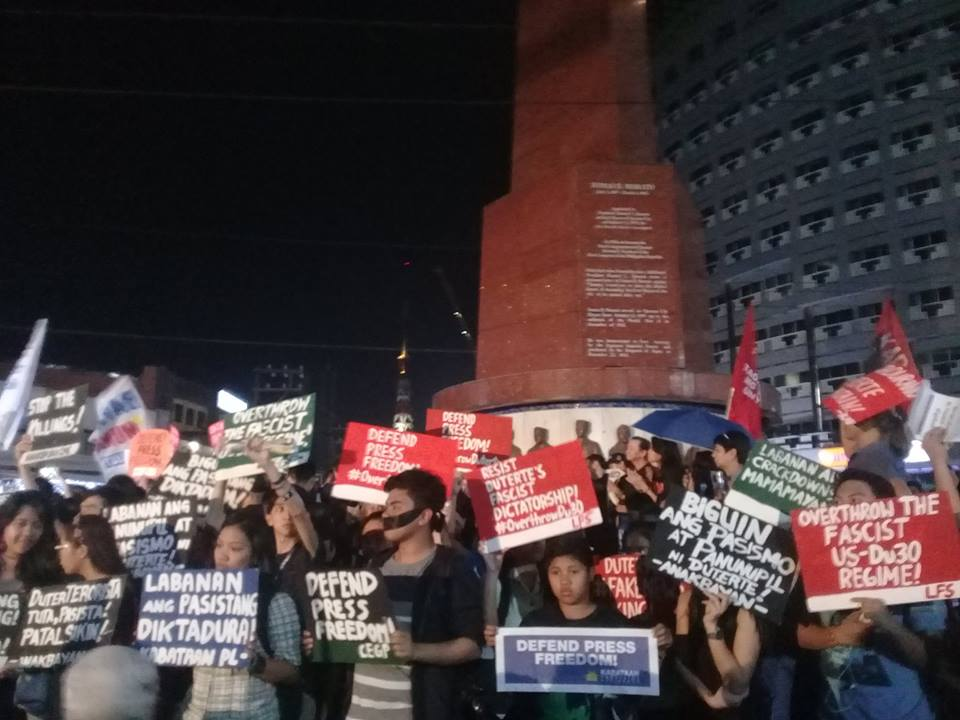
Youth groups, including Anakbayan participated in a protest demanding press freedom.

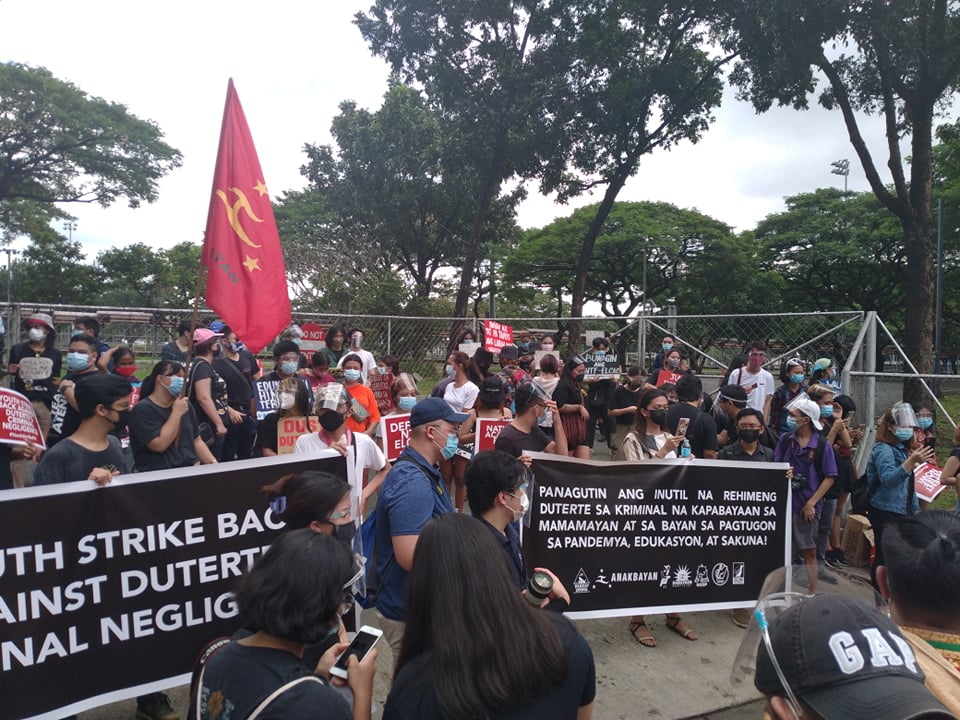
Youth Strike in front of Ateneo de Manila, November 17, 2020.

Anakbayan has been highly vocal against President Rodrigo Duterte.

In 2017, Anakbayan said that protests lead to urge President Duterte to sign the law granting free education for public universities, citing as a victory for students, parents, and administrators. Months after, however, they criticized the policy as a lie, saying that it became a way to rehash socialized tuition schemes for public universities and colleges.

As groups staged a series protests from November 9–14, 2017, against the Association of Southeast Asian Nations (ASEAN) Summit hosted by the Philippines and the visit of United States President Donald Trump. a group of protesters led by Anakbayan managed to reached the gate of Philippine International Convention Center, despite tight security.

On early 2018, Anakbayan was participative in "Black Friday Protests" due to the revocation of online news site Rappler by Securities and Exchange Commission, among other issues concerning press freedom.

Following the shooting of 37-year-old priest Mark Ventura on April 29, 2018 Catholic Bishops' Conference of the Philippines, Senator Francis Pangilinan, and Anakbayan condemned the murder of Ventura, with Anakbayan called it "a fascistic, tyrannical, and mafia-style rule" by the Duterte administration.

On February 4, 2020, Anakbayan gathered in front of the Philippine General Hospital to protest the government's lack of action to prevent the coronavirus from spreading in the country. Anakbayan also led online and physical protests, criticizing Duterte administration's response to the COVID-19 pandemic. This includes a Youth Strike that physically started on November 17, 2020, in which students from various universities gathered in front of Ateneo de Manila University, the school where the first petitioners of the strike study. The concerns of the petitions include criticism on national government response of COVID-19, disaster response after Typhoon Ulysses, and the condition of education and studentry amidst the pandemic.

Anakbayan was pointed to be involved in an alleged abduction of a young activist named Alicia Jasper Lucena. However, on September 15, 2020, the Supreme Court has junked the plea for protective writs filed by Francis and Relissa Lucena, the parents of Alicia Jasper, the alleged missing activist after it was found out that she was not missing after all.

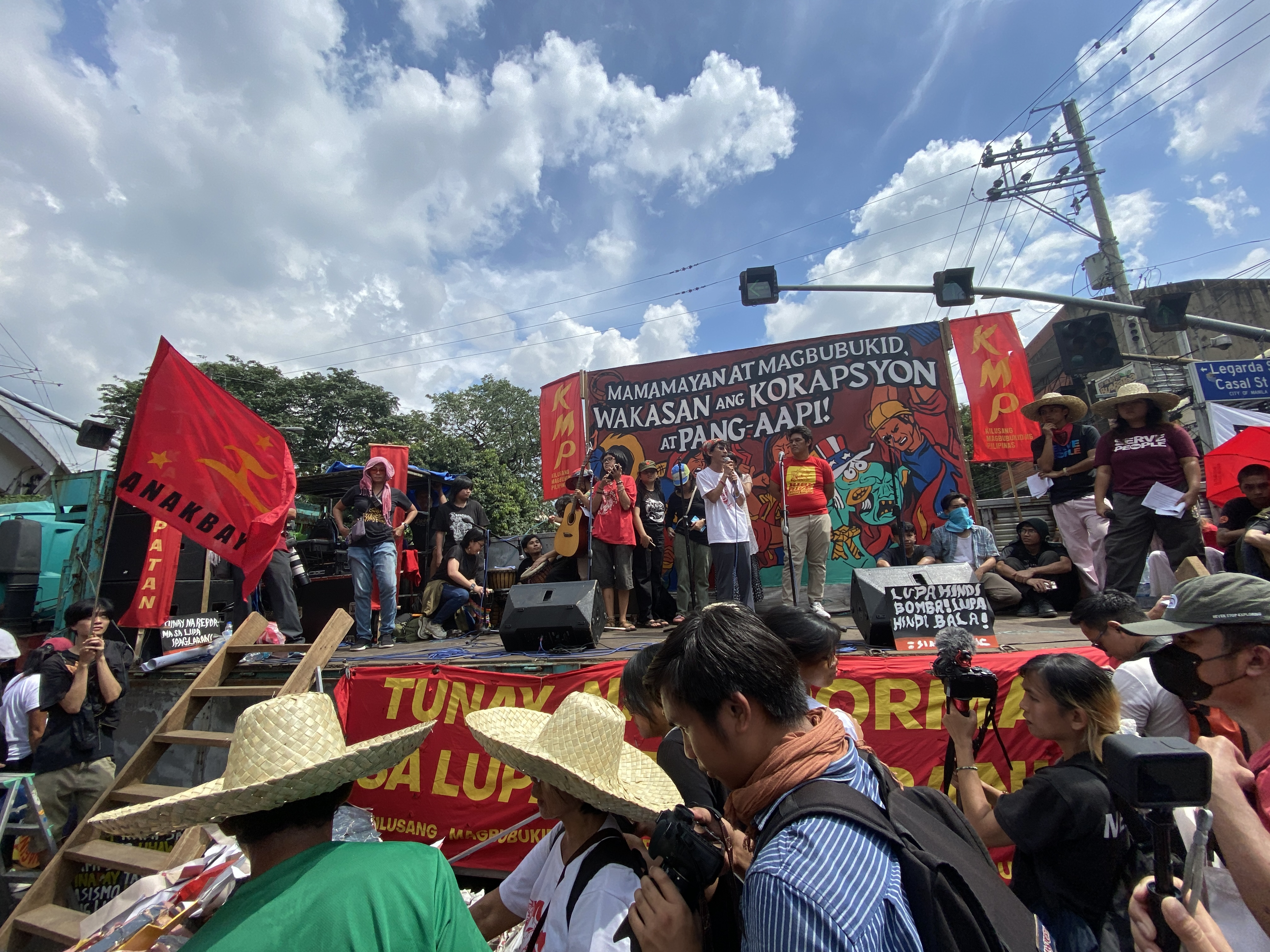
Chairperson Mhing Gomez, representing Anakbayan, speaking at the peasant mobilization, October 21, 2025.

Especially under the administration of Duterte, Anakbayan has also been a subject of "redtagging", or linking the group to the Communist Party of the Philippines. Alex Danday, a former spokesperson, said that it is a way for the government to "discredit activism" and as a way to stifle student power.

== Membership ==
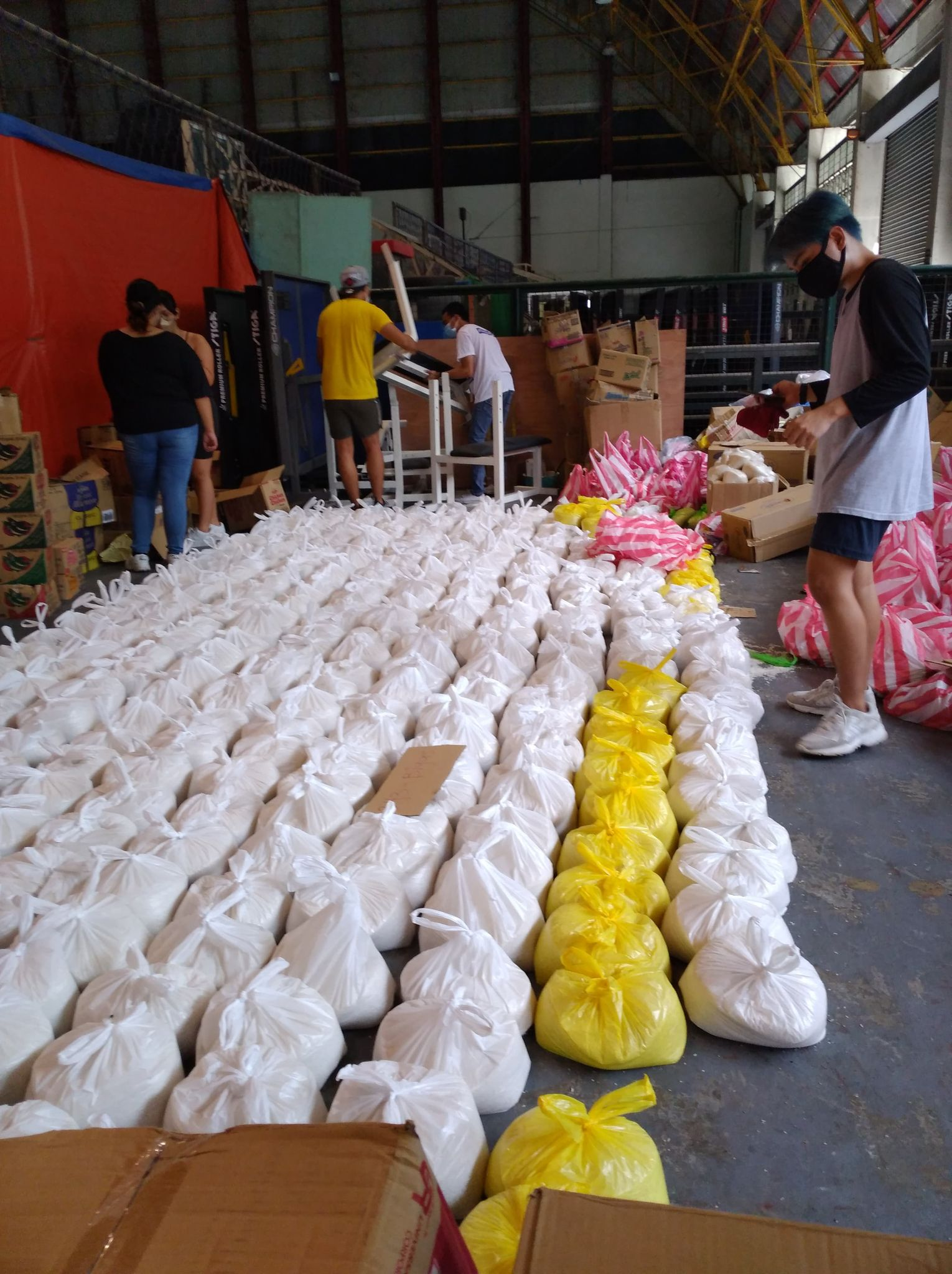
Relief work by national democratic organizations, December 2020.

Anakbayan is open to Filipino youth aged 13–35. As a grassroots organization, Anakbayan goes into communities to hold activities such as alternative classes, forums, discussions, political education, integration among impoverished communities, relief operations, dialogue and engagement among government officials and other civic groups, and various forms of protest actions. Panday Sining served as the cultural arm of Anakbayan, giving artists in the movement the space to express their political beliefs through creative mediums.

As of 2019, Anakbayan has more than 20,000 members worldwide, found through chapters all around the Philippines and abroad whose international members have Filipino origin. Aside from chapters in the United States, Anakbayan chapters are also present throughout lands of the Filipino diaspora, such as in Canada, Europe, Japan, and Australia.

== Controversies ==
=== Alleged Connections to the CPP-NPA ===
Anakbayan, along with other allied organizations within the Bagong Alyansang Makabayan, have been accused of supporting or being directly involved with the Communist Party of the Philippines and its armed wing, the New People's Army. The organization has been tagged as being allegedly involved in recruitment in universities by the Philippine government. Officials have accused Anakbayan as being part of the armed organization that aims to overthrow the government. Anakbayan has repeatedly condemned these accusations, which they call a form of red-tagging.
