= Karl Gaspar =

Filipino activist, author and playwright

Karl M. Gaspar, CSsR (b. 1947) is a Filipino Redemptorist brother, socio-anthropologist, theologian, writer, philosopher and Martial Law survivor best known for his long history of advocacies in supporting indigenous people's rights and peacebuilding, and for numerous literary and journalistic works, including plays, more than thirty books, and regular columns for news outfits MindaNews and UCA News.

== See also ==
- Carolyn Arguillas
