= Jaime Ongpin =

Filipino businessman

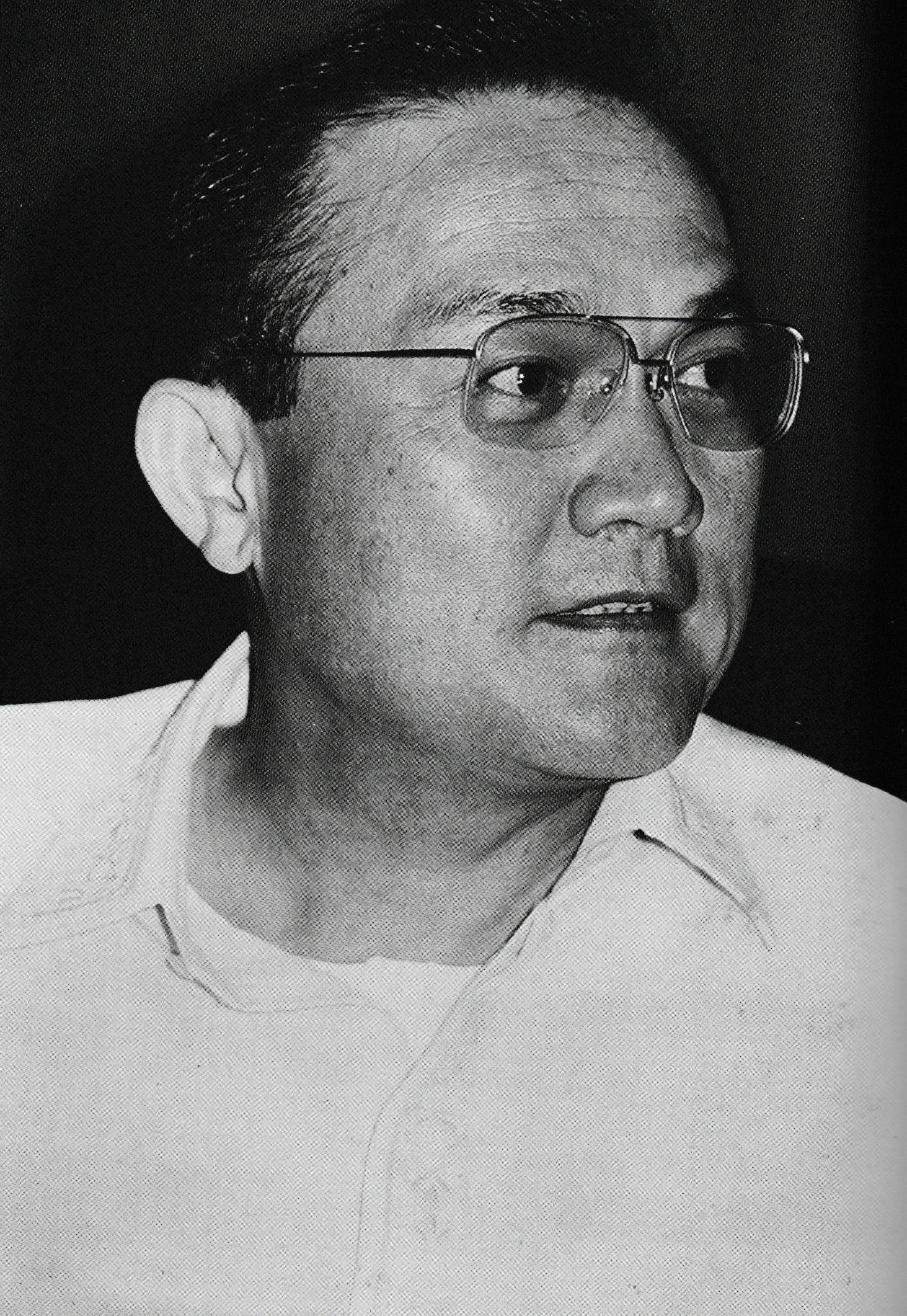
- Ongpin in 1986

17th Secretary of Finance
- In office March 26, 1986 – September 14, 1987
- President: Corazon Aquino
- Preceded by: Cesar Virata
- Succeeded by: Vicente Jayme

Personal details
- Born: Jaime Velayo Ongpin; June 15, 1939 San Juan, Rizal, Commonwealth of the Philippines
- Died: December 7, 1987 (aged 48) Makati, Philippines
- Party: UNIDO
- Spouse: Maria Isabel Garcia (m. 1965)
- Relatives: Roberto Ongpin (brother)
- Education: Ateneo de Manila University (BS); Harvard Business School (MBA)
- Profession: Businessman

Jaime "Jimmy" Velayo Ongpin (June 15, 1939 – December 7, 1987) was a Filipino businessman and activist. He was the Minister of Finance of the Philippines under President Corazon Aquino from 1986 to 1987, after having played an instrumental role in her campaign. Ongpin was the younger brother of Roberto Ongpin who had been Minister of Trade and Industry under President Ferdinand Marcos.

== Early life ==
Ongpin was a 1958 graduate of the Ateneo de Manila University and from Harvard Business School in 1962. He had been advertising manager of the Philippine subsidiary of Procter & Gamble. In 1962, he joined the Benguet Corporation, one of the country's leading gold mining companies. In 1974, he became company president.

== Political activism ==
Despite his brother's ties to the Marcos regime, Jaime Ongpin emerged as a vocal critic of crony capitalism. In 1981, he penned a scathing letter to the Asian Wall Street Journal condemning government bailouts of companies owned by known associates of Marcos dictatorship. He continued speaking out through public letters, speeches, and briefs, most notably The Eleven MIP's (a.k.a. The Eleven Major Infuriating Problems) in 1983, targeting the misuse of public funds.

Following the assassination of Ninoy Aquino in 1983, Ongpin intensified his activism, forming groups like Manindigan and supporting independent media like Veritas. Ongpin was instrumental in organizing and financing Corazon Aquino’s presidential campaign. During the 1986 snap elections and ensuing People Power Revolution, he served as a key negotiator between Aquino's camp and leaders of the armed forces, including Juan Ponce Enrile and Fidel Ramos.

== Secretary of Finance of the Philippines (1986–1987) ==
Appointed as Secretary of Finance by President Aquino on March 26, 1986, Ongpin was tasked with restoring economic stability in the wake of the Marcos regime and regaining the confidence of international creditors. His tenure was marked by efforts to rehabilitate the country's fiscal position, culminating in the successful negotiation of a US$13.2 billion debt rescheduling agreement in July 1987. While this achievement was lauded by global financial institutions, it drew domestic criticism for failing to secure more substantial debt relief.

However, Ongpin's position became increasingly untenable amid widening ideological rifts within the Aquino cabinet, particularly between market-oriented technocrats and left-leaning reformists. The situation deteriorated further in the aftermath of the failed coup attempt in August 1987, and Ongpin was ultimately removed from office during a cabinet reshuffle on September 14, 1987.

== Suicide ==
Less than three months later after the cabinet reshuffle, Ongpin was found dead on December 7, 1987, in his Makati office of a self-inflicted gunshot wound at the age of 48. His death was officially ruled a suicide, attributed to mounting emotional strain and frustration over persistent cabinet infighting. President Aquino paid tribute to him as an “outstanding Filipino who had the courage of his convictions”.

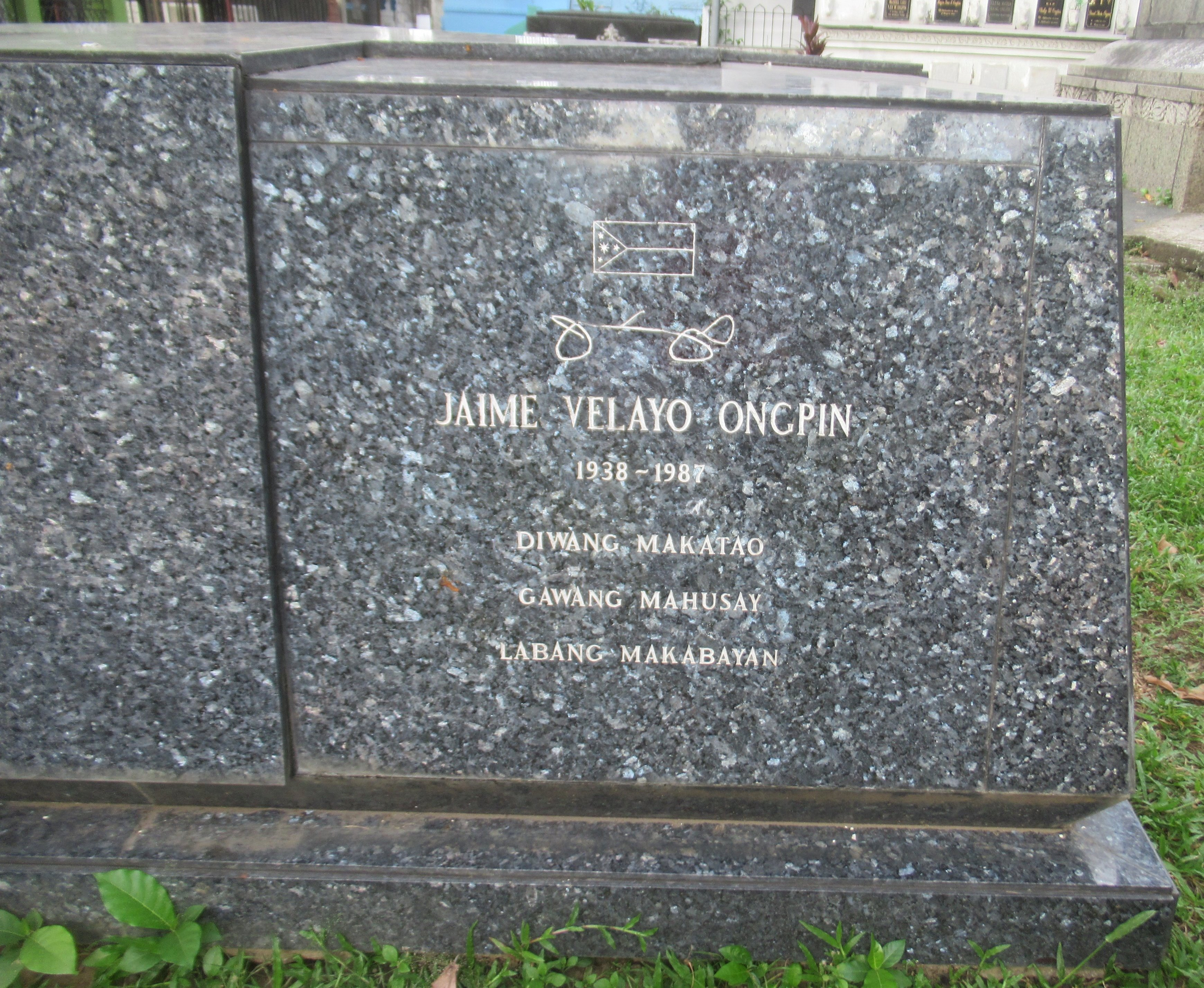
Ongpin's grave at Manila North Cemetery.

His widow, Isabel Ongpin, later remarked that he had become despondent over the factionalism within the Aquino administration and disillusioned by the limited reforms brought about by the People Power Revolution.

== Legacy ==
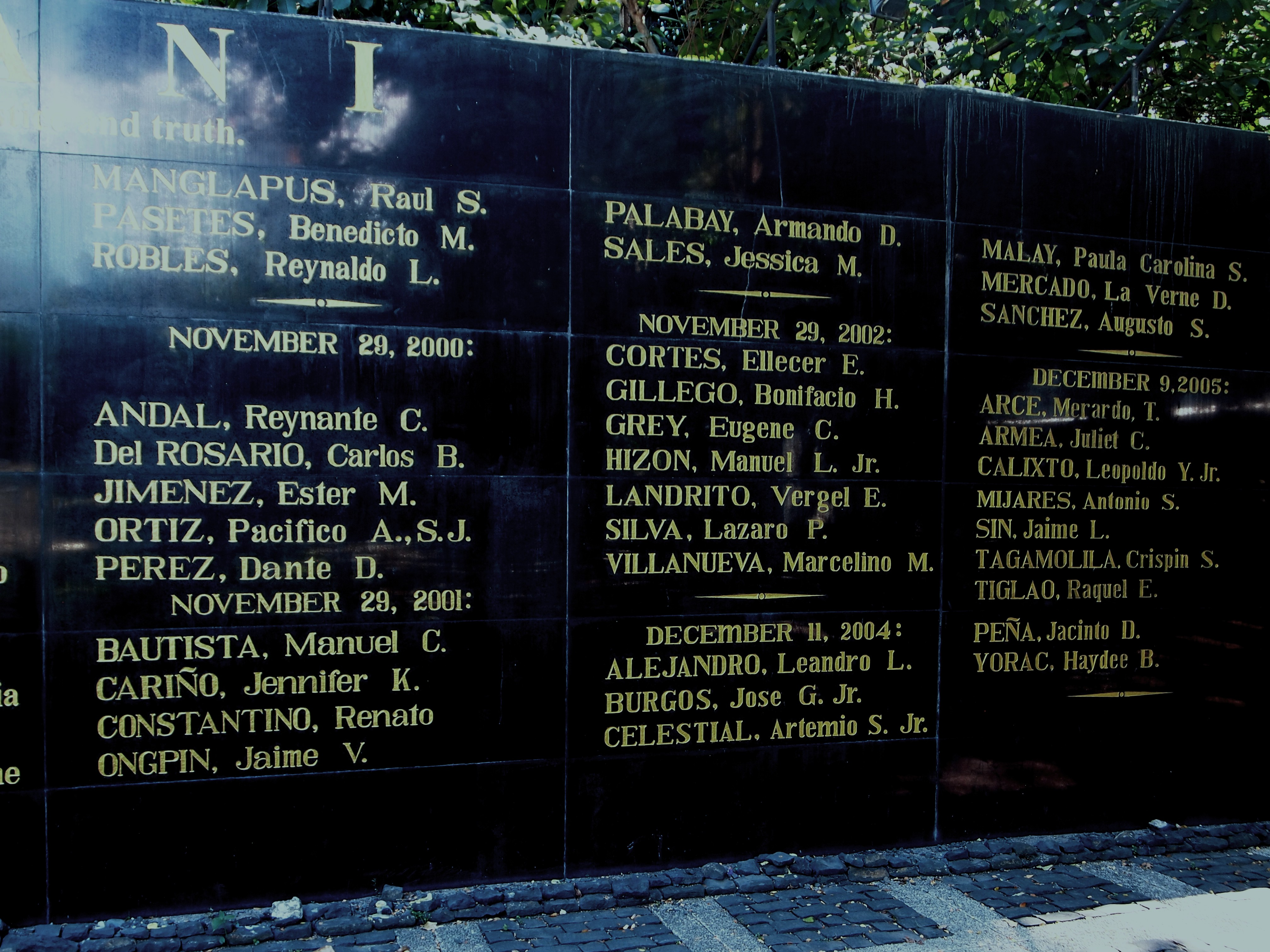
Detail of the Wall of Remembrance at the Bantayog ng mga Bayani, showing names from the 2001 batch of Bantayog Honorees, including that of Jaime Ongpin.

In recognition of his role in restoring Philippine democracy and his steadfast opposition to the martial law regime, Jaime V. Ongpin was honoured in 2001 with his name inscribed on the Bantayog ng mga Bayani memorial. In 2018, the Human Rights Victims' Claims Board (HRVCB) formally recognized Ongpin and 126 other individuals as a motu proprio victim of human rights violations committed under the Marcos dictatorship.

To further commemorate his legacy, the Center for Media Freedom & Responsibility established the Jaime V. Ongpin Journalism Seminar in 1995—an annual event that includes an educational grant and awards to foster excellence in investigative and explanatory reporting.

A biography titled Jaime V. Ongpin, The Enigma: A Profile of the Filipino Manager, written by National Artist for Literature Nick Joaquin, was first published in 1990 by the Jaime V. Ongpin Institute of Business and Government at Ateneo de Manila University. A revised edition was released in 2019.

Ongpin was also portrayed by actor Noel Trinidad in the 1988 film A Dangerous Life, which dramatised the events of the People Power Revolution.

Political offices
Preceded by Cesar Virata as Minister of Finance	Secretary of Finance; 1986–1987	Succeeded by Vicente Jayme
