= Cristina Catalla =

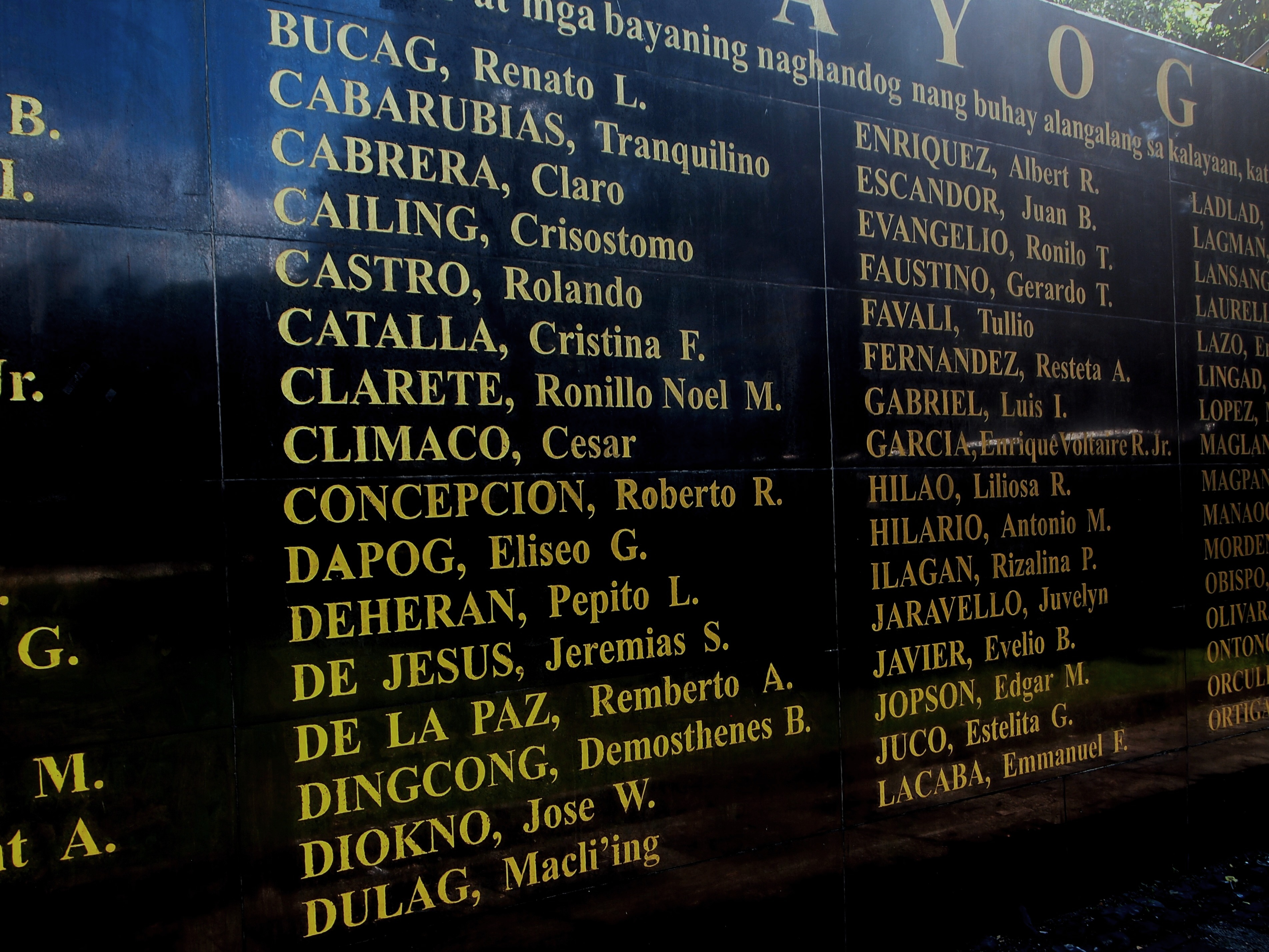
- Detail of the Wall of Remembrance at the Bantayog ng mga Bayani, showing names from the first batch of Bantayog Honorees, including that of Cristina Catalla
- Born: Melania Cristina Catalla; December 25, 1950
- Disappeared: July 31, 1977 (aged 26)
- Education: University of the Philippines Los Baños
- Occupation: Activist
- Awards: Honored at the Bantayog ng mga Bayani wall of remembrance

Melania Cristina Catalla (born December 25, 1950 — disappeared on July 31, 1977) was an anti-martial law activist who belonged to a network of community organizations in the Southern Tagalog region in the Philippines whose disappearance on July 31, 1977, became a rallying cry of the Philippine resistance against the dictatorship of Ferdinand Marcos.

Catalla's name is inscribed on the Wall of Remembrance at the Bantayog ng mga Bayani, a memorial that honors martyrs and heroes who fought the dictatorship. She is also one of the heroes honored by the University of the Philippines Los Baños on its 'Hagdan ng Malayang Kamalayan' memorial.

== See also ==
- Bantayog ng mga Bayani
- List of people who disappeared mysteriously: post-1970
- Southern Tagalog 10
