= Bantayog ng mga Bayani =

Memorial and museum in Quezon City, Philippines

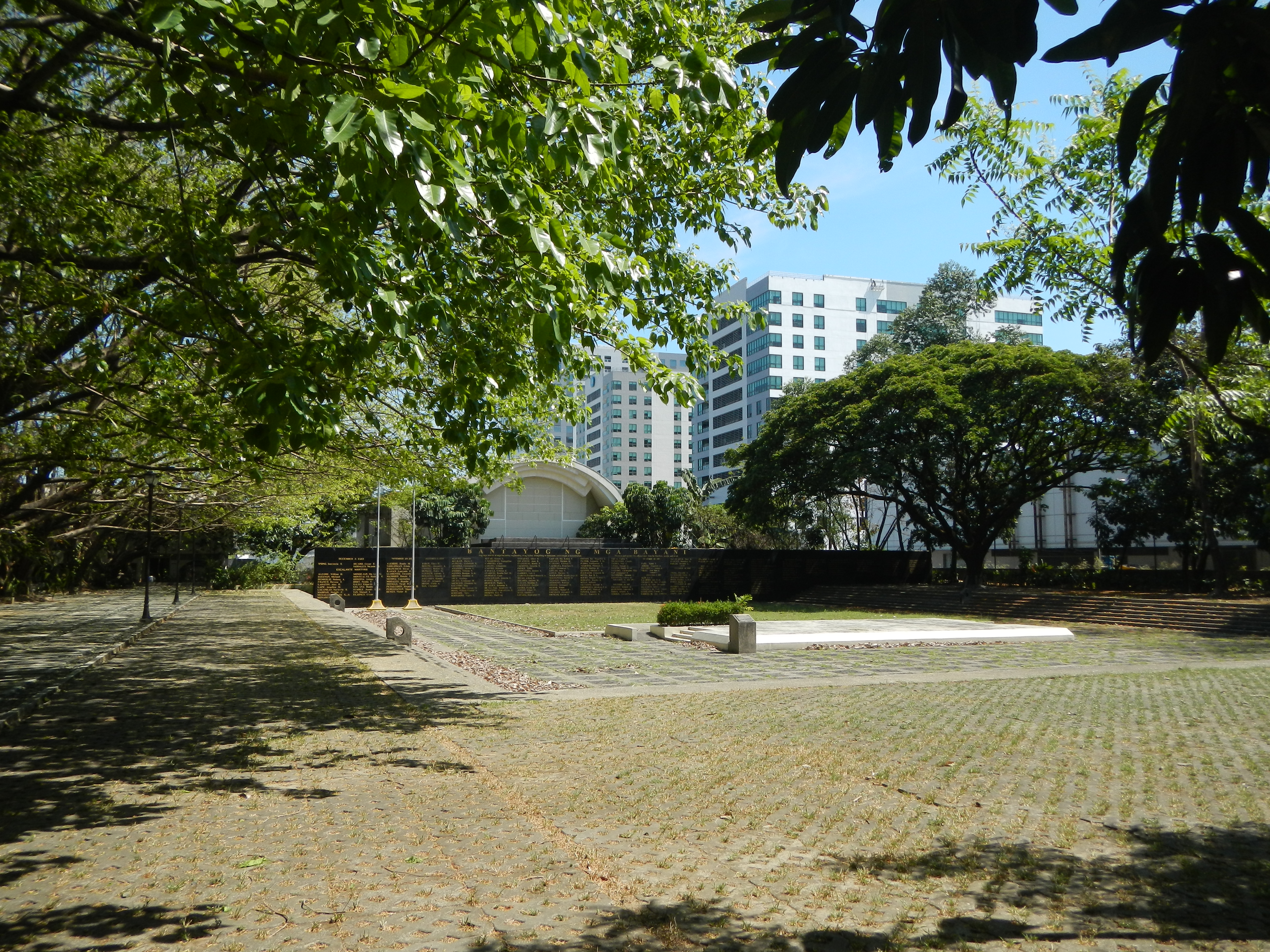
- Interactive map of Bantayog ng mga Bayani
- Location: Quezon Avenue, Diliman, Quezon City, Philippines
- Coordinates: 14°38′39″N 121°2′21″E
- Dedicated to: The memory of Martial law in the Philippines and People Power Revolution
- Website: https://bantayogngmgabayani.org

The Bantayog ng mga Bayani (lit. 'Monument of Heroes'), sometimes simply referred to as the Bantayog, is a monument, museum, and historical research center in Quezon City, Philippines, which honors the martyrs and heroes of the struggle against the dictatorship of the 10th Filipino president Ferdinand Marcos.

== History ==
Immediately following the People Power Revolution in 1986 that ousted President Ferdinand Marcos, Ruben Mallari, a Filipino-American medical doctor visiting the Philippines, proposed the creation of a memorial as a dedication to people who opposed the authoritarian rule of Marcos but didn't live past the People Power Revolution.

The Bantayog ng mga Bayani Memorial Foundation was organized as a response to Mallari's suggestion, with Ledivina V. Cariño, former Dean of the University of the Philippines' College of Public Administration aiding with the creation of a concept paper for the memorial. The foundation soon established a Research and Documentation Committee for the purpose of verifying the nominees of the people who should be honored.

From its inception, the Bantayog ng mga Bayani was designed to honor all of those who struggled against the 1972 martial law regime, regardless of their affiliations. As such, it has maintained a stance that is "uncompromising against Marcos and the Marcos dictatorship" while honoring all individuals who opposed it, regardless of their political colors or beliefs.

The current chairman of the Bantayog ng mga Bayani Foundation since August 30, 2022 is Chel Diokno, human rights lawyer, former chairperson of the Free Legal Assistance Group, the founding dean of the De La Salle University Tañada-Diokno School of Law, representative of Akbayan partylist and son of Jose W. Diokno.

On April 9, 2024, Day of Valor, the 38th Foundation of Bantayog ng mga Bayani awarded 13 honorees led by Artemio Panganiban and Rene Saguisag. The living heroes were crowned as "Haligi ng Bantayog" with handmade "Sablay" at the University of the Philippines Hotel.

== Wall of Remembrance ==
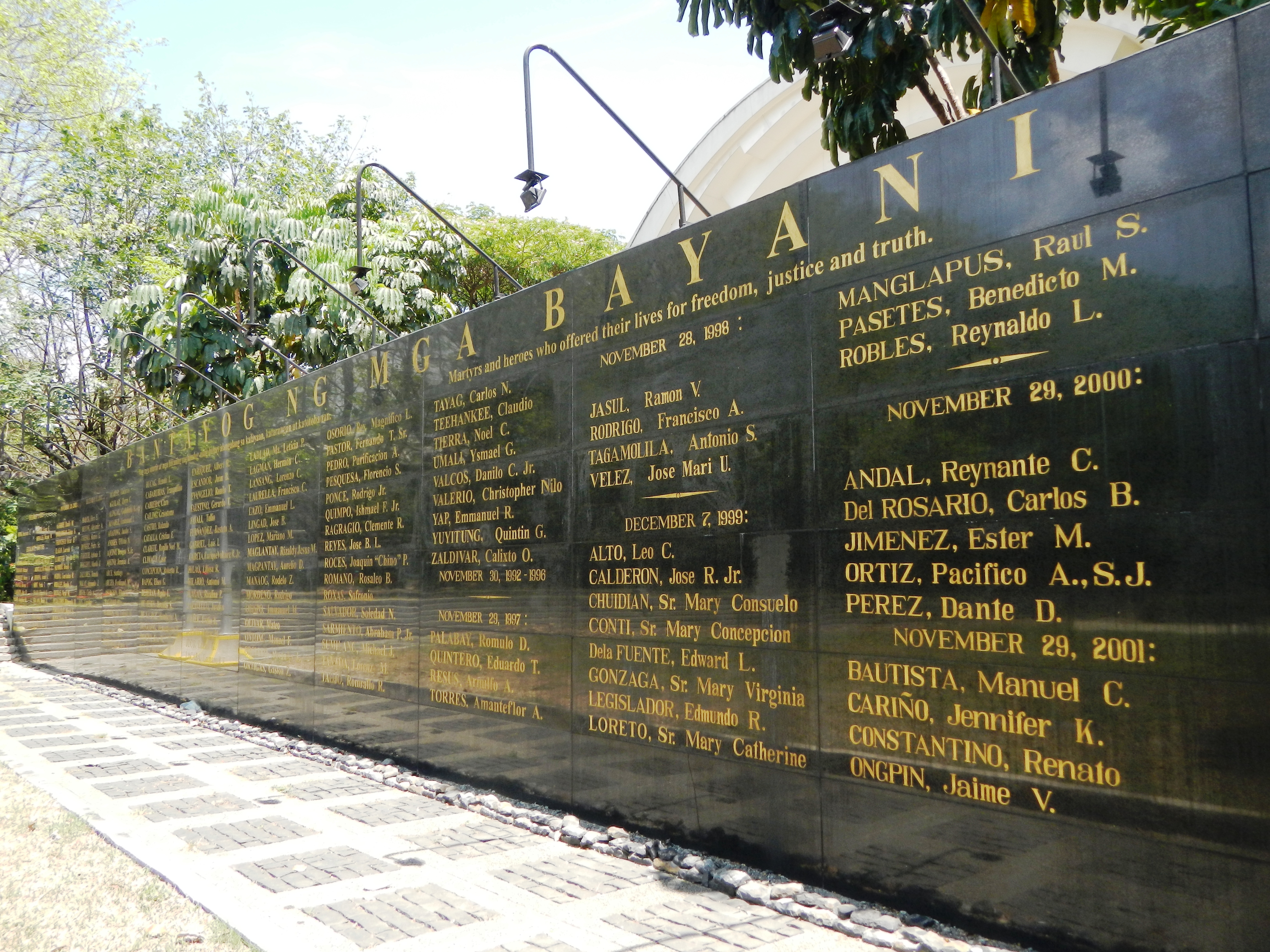
The Wall of Remembrance

The central element of the Bantayog memorial is the granite "Wall of Remembrance" on which are inscribed the names of the martyrs and heroes who were the victims of the abuses of the Marcos dictatorship.

Individuals honored on the wall are nominated by victims' families, civic organization members, or the general public. These nominations are reviewed under a set of criteria by the Bantayog ng mga Bayani Memorial Foundation's Research and Documentation Committee, which makes recommendations to its executive committee for further review. The Foundation's Board of Trustees then gives the final approval.

The initial intent had been to honor victims who had been martyred during the dictatorship period, but after extensive deliberations, the foundation decided to also honor people who advocated freedom, justice, and democracy during the Marcos administration who lived beyond the People Power Revolution.

The first batch of 65 names was enshrined on the wall in 1992, including such figures as Kalinga tribal leader Macli-ing Dulag; publisher Chino Roces and journalist Alex Orcullo; former Supreme Court chief justices Roberto Concepcion and Claudio Teehankee; former Supreme Court associate justices J. B. L. Reyes and Calixto Zaldivar; Italian missionary priest Tullio Favali, Caoayan, Ilocos Sur parish priest Zacarias Agatep, Sister Mary Bernard Jimenez (enshrined as Mary Bernard), lay social worker Puri Pedro, Philippine Independent Church priest Jeremias Aquino; poet-activist Eman Lacaba; student activists such as Rizalina Ilagan, Cristina Catalla and Liliosa Hilao; Philippine Collegian editor-in-chief Abraham Sarmiento Jr., entrepreneur Gaston Z. Ortigas; as well as political leaders such as former senators Lorenzo Tañada, Benigno Aquino Jr. and Jose W. Diokno, Antique Province governor Evelio Javier, Zamboanga City mayor Cesar Climaco, and Dipolog councilor Jacobo Amatong.

As of the Bantayog's latest honoring ceremony last November 30, 2023, a total of 332 names have been enshrined on the Wall of Remembrance.

Ang Mamatay ng Dahil sa 'Yo: Heroes and Martyrs of the Filipino People in the Struggle Against Dictatorship 1972-1986 published in 2015 by the National Historical Commission of the Philippines, features short biographies of the "heroes and martyrs of the... resistance against the martial law dictatorship."

== Inang Bayan Monument ==
Another prominent element of the memorial is the 35-foot "Inang Bayan" Monument, prominently located near the roadside frontage of the memorial so that it can be seen by vehicles along Quezon Avenue near its corner with EDSA.

The monument depicts a woman reaching out to the sky for freedom, holding the body of a fallen young man. The woman is a metaphorical depiction of the Philippine "mother land" (inang bayan in Filipino), while the man represents self-sacrifice and heroism, alluding to the martys who died for the freedom of the Philippine people.

Three plaques on the monument's base contain the last stanza of Jose Rizal's "Mi Ultimo Adios" in English, Filipino, and the original Spanish. The English plaque reads:

"I die just when I see the dawn break
Through the gloom of night, to herald the day:
And if color is lacking my blood thou shall take,
Pour’d out at need for thy dear sake,
To dye with its crimson the waking ray."

The monument was created by Eduardo Castrillo, a Filipino sculptor whose other prominent works include the People Power Monument (1993), the Bonifacio and the Katipunan Revolution Monument (1998) and the "Consolidated Growth through Education" mural that symbolizes the Polytechnic University of the Philippines (1974).

== The Bantayog Museum ==
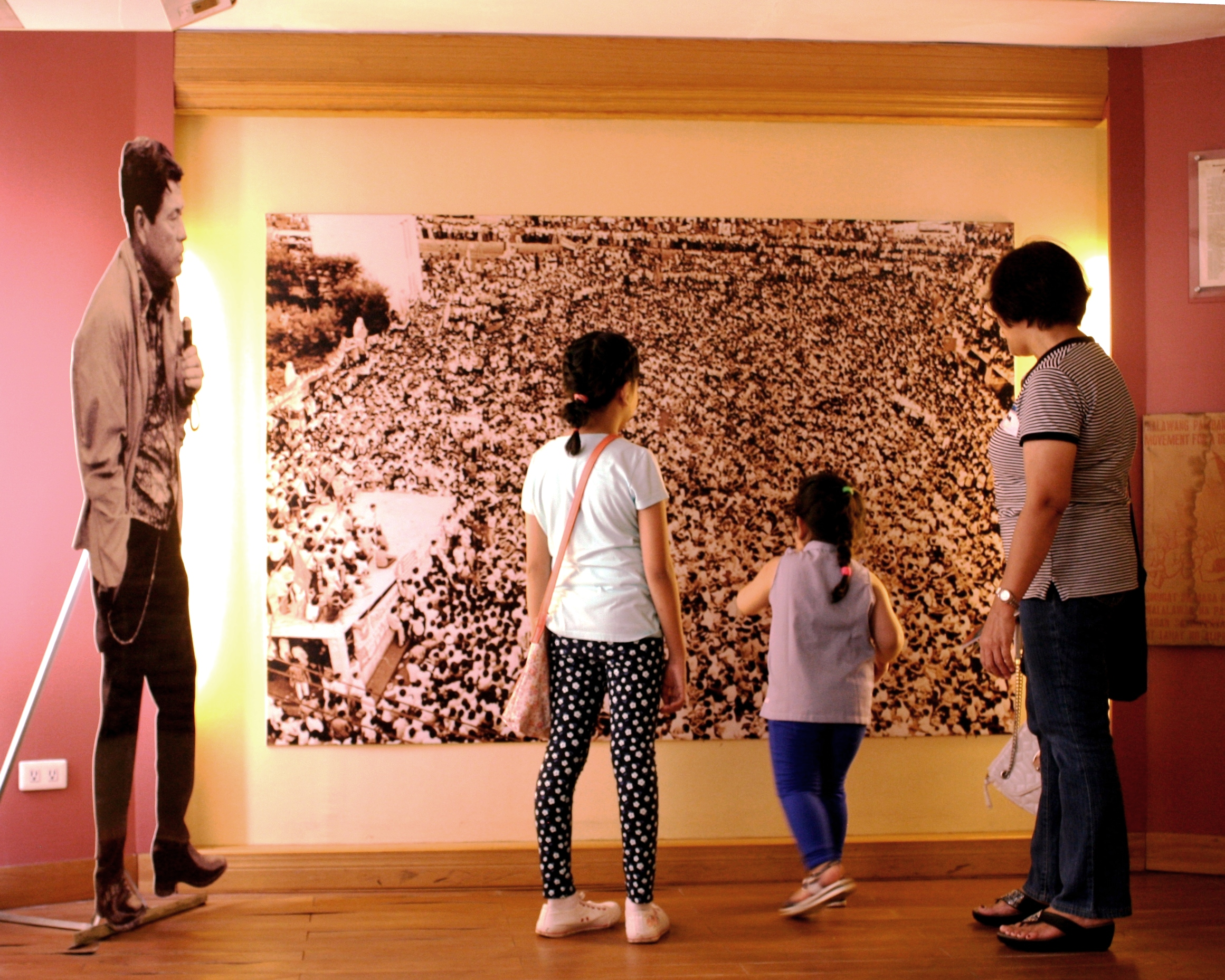
A standee of Sen. Diokno delivering a rally for the MCCCL at Plaza Miranda, hours before martial law was signed

Established in the mid-2000s, the Bantayog ng mga Bayani Museum occupies the second floor of the Sen. Jovito R. Salonga building just behind the Wall of Remembrance. The wall features rallies organized at Plaza Miranda by the Movement of Concerned Citizens for Civil Liberties (MCCCL) from 1971 to 1972, with the largest involving 50,000 people on September 21 protesting "Oplan Sagittarius", a plan by Marcos to declare martial law. Marcos would later sign martial law into declaration after his nervous reaction to the event a few hours earlier.

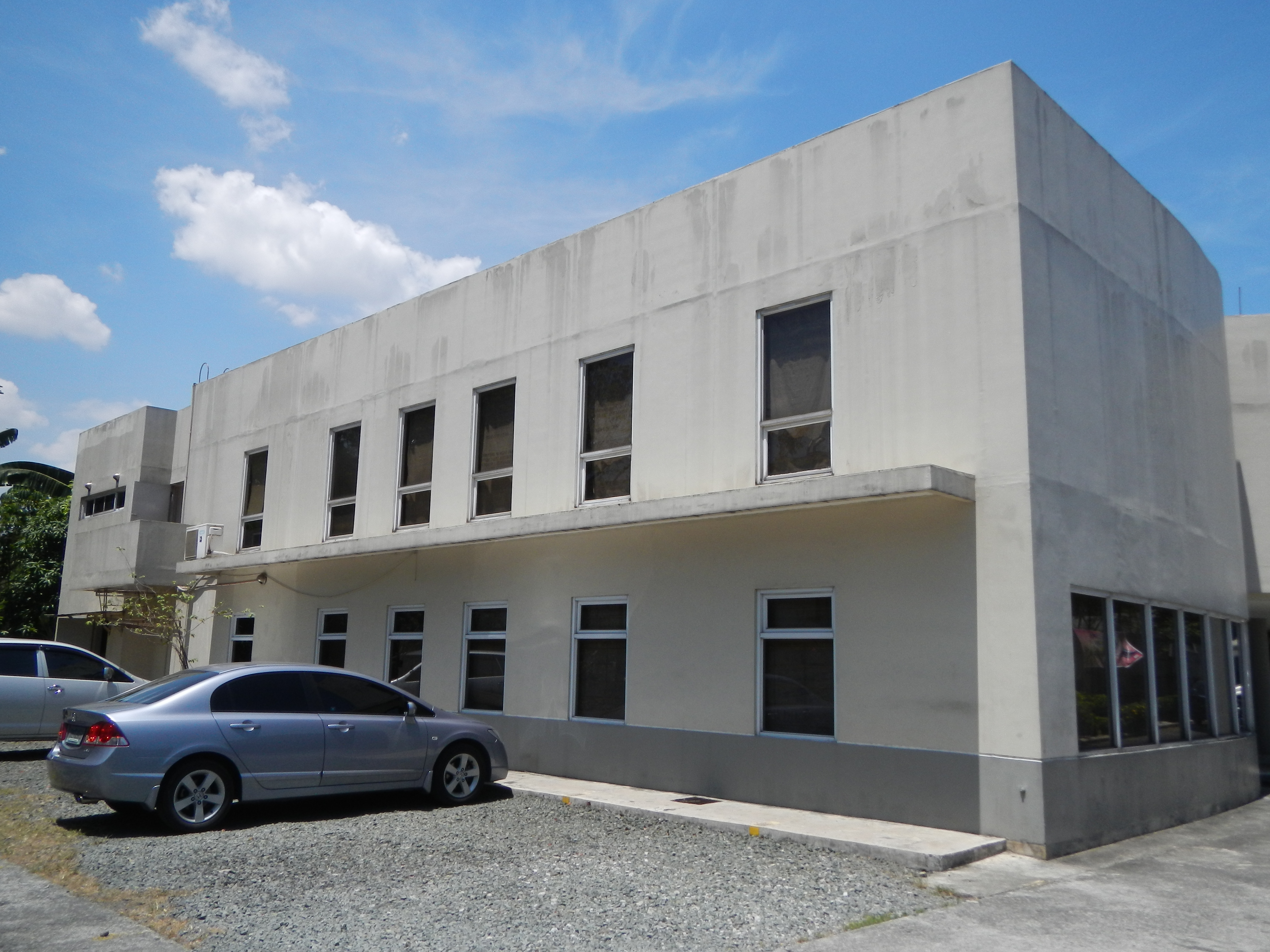
Museo ng Bantayog Façade 2014

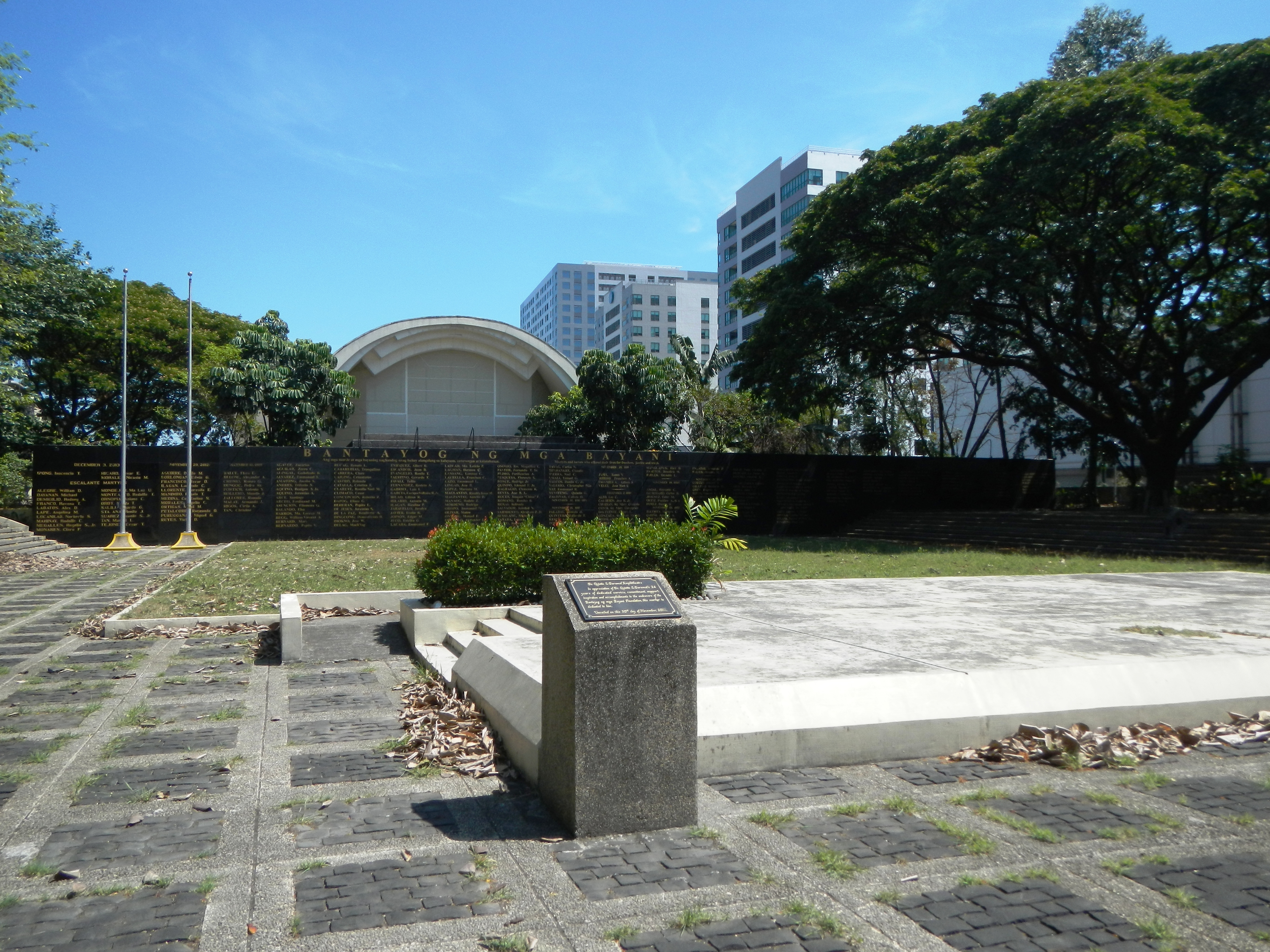
Dr. Quintin S. Doromal amphitheatre

=== Main collection ===
The main collection of the museum features objects associated with the recognized heroes and martyrs, as well as with the historical period of the Marcos dictatorship, and hopes to make the history of the period come alive for visitors by showing them that the horrors of martial law happened to real-life men and women.

The museum primarily focuses on the years of Marcos' rule from 1965 to 1986, with a particular focus on events that took place after the 1972 declaration of Martial Law. But in order to provide historical context, it also briefly covers events that took place before Marcos' presidency in 1965 and in the period immediately after the EDSA Revolution, up to approximately 1987.

==== Replica jail cell ====
One of the highlights of the Bantayog Museum's collection is a replica jail cell based on the memory of Martial Law victim Hilda Narciso, a church worker who was arrested by Marcos' Martial Law forces, subjected to rape and torture, and was held with 20 fellow detainees in a cell no bigger than two or three square meters.

==== Diagram of resistance organizations ====
An often-overlooked display at the Bantayog Museum presents a diagram of various organizations who were involved in the resistance against the excesses of the Marcos dictatorship, ranging from conservative groups, including faith-based organizations such as the Negros Occidental Women Religious Association (NOWRA), and the Task Force Detainees of the Philippines, and business organizations such as the Makati Business Club; to progressive organisations like the Kilusang Mayo Uno, and many groups in between. While not a flashy display, academics have noted that the diagram is one of the most complete compilations of resistance groups to have been made public thus far.

=== Hall of Remembrance ===
Beside the main gallery of the museum is a permanent exhibit called the "Hall or Remembrance," which provides more details about the lives of the heroes and martyrs honored on the Wall of Remembrance outside. The Hall or Remembrance groups the heroes and martyrs into the various sectors that came together to fight the dictatorship, and features "capsule biographies" of each honoree.

=== Other exhibits ===
Other significant displays at the Bantayog include artifacts such as the Senate Seal used during the term of Jovito Salonga and artwork by such as Jerry Araos' Utang na Labas (lit. "External Debt") - a play on the Filipino concept of Utang na loob (inner or soul debt), and how the Marcos administration empoverished the Filipino nation.

The Salonga building and the Bantayog grounds often also host temporary exhibits, such as Toym Imao's "Desaparacidos."

== Grounds ==
The grounds of the Bantayong ng mga Bayani were designed by Ildefonso P. Santos Jr., who was proclaimed a National Artist of the Philippines for Landscape Architecture in 2006.
