= The Varsitarian =

Official student publication of the University of Santo Tomas

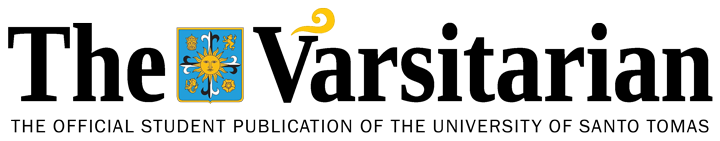

- Front page of May 1, 2024 edition
- Type: Student publication
- Format: Broadsheet, magazine, online newspaper
- Owner: University of Santo Tomas
- Editor-in-chief: Amanda Luella A. Rivera
- Founded: January 16, 1928; 98 years ago
- Language: English, Filipino
- Headquarters: Rm. 105, Tan Yan Kee Student Center, University of Santo Tomas, España Boulevard, Sampaloc, Manila
- OCLC number: 2208490
- Website: varsitarian.net

The Varsitarian (Varsi, The V, or V) is the official student publication of the University of Santo Tomas (UST). Founded in January 1928 by a group of students led by Jose Villa Panganiban, it is one of the first student newspapers in the Philippines. Despite a shift to a digital-first strategy, the print edition continues to be published at least monthly. The lampoon issue is called The Vuisitarian. Tomas U. Santos, the mascot of The Varsitarian, is a Thomasian who represents the students of the campus. He is usually seen accompanied by a talking, and quite cynical, T-square.

Aside from publishing the school paper, The Varsitarian holds the Inkblots national campus journalism fellowship and organizes the Pautakan, the longest-running campus-based quiz contest in the Philippines. It also organizes Ustetika, the country's longest-running university-based literary competition, and the Creative Writing Workshop.

The Varsitarian has published editorial supplements and magazines such as Montage, Tomasino, Breaktime, and Amihan. Botomasino is the annual supplement for the UST Central Student Council elections.

== History ==
The first issue of The Varsitarian came off the press on January 16, 1928, with Pablo Anido as the first editor in chief. However, the title of the "father of The Varsitarian" is given to Jose Villa Panganiban, who managed the day-to-day operations of the school paper. The other founders included Elizabeth C. Bowers and Olimpia Baltazar, a granddaughter of poet Francisco Baltazar. The paper cost 10 centavos, and was bought by 426 people out of a possible 2,000 students.

The Varsitarian co-founded the College Editors Guild of the Philippines on July 25, 1931, along with The GUIDON of the Ateneo de Manila, The Philippine Collegian of the University of the Philippines Diliman and The National of National University.

Publication of The Varsitarian was interrupted during the Second World War, when the University of Santo Tomas campus was converted by Japanese forces into the Santo Tomas Internment Camp, where thousands of civilians were held from January 1942 until its liberation in February 1945.

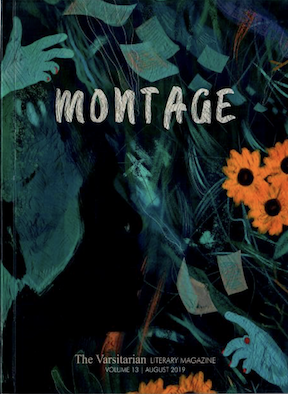
Cover of Montage literary magazine, August 2019

Postwar issues placed a greater emphasis on literary writing. The publication's literary orientation became particularly pronounced during the editorship of Francisco Sionil José, who later became a National Artist of the Philippines for Literature. Under José, the monthly Varsitarian was developed into a literary magazine. The period formed part of the publication's longstanding association with Philippine writers, several of whom began or developed their writing careers as members of its staff.

A number of Philippine journalists began their careers as members of the Varsitarian staff, including: Teodoro Valencia, Joe Guevara, Felix Bautista, Jose Bautista, Joe Burgos, Antonio Siddayao, Jess Sison, Jullie Yap-Daza, Antonio Lopez, Rina Jimenez-David, Neal Cruz, A. O. Flores, Jake Macasaet, Fred Marquez, Mario Hernando, Alfredo Saulo, Alice Colet Villadolid, and Eugenia Duran Apostol.

The titans of Philippine literature learned writing in The Varsitarian: Bienvenido Lumbera, F. Sionil José, Celso Al Carunungan, Ophelia Dimalanta, Paz Latorena, Cirilo Bautista, Federico Licsi Espino, Wilfrido Nolledo, Rogelio Sicat, Cristina Pantoja-Hidalgo, Norma Miraflor, Eric Gamalinda and Vim Nadera. Among its contributors were Nick Joaquin, Teodoro Benigno, and Andres Narvasa, who would become chief justice of the Philippines.

=== Coverage of national and university issues ===
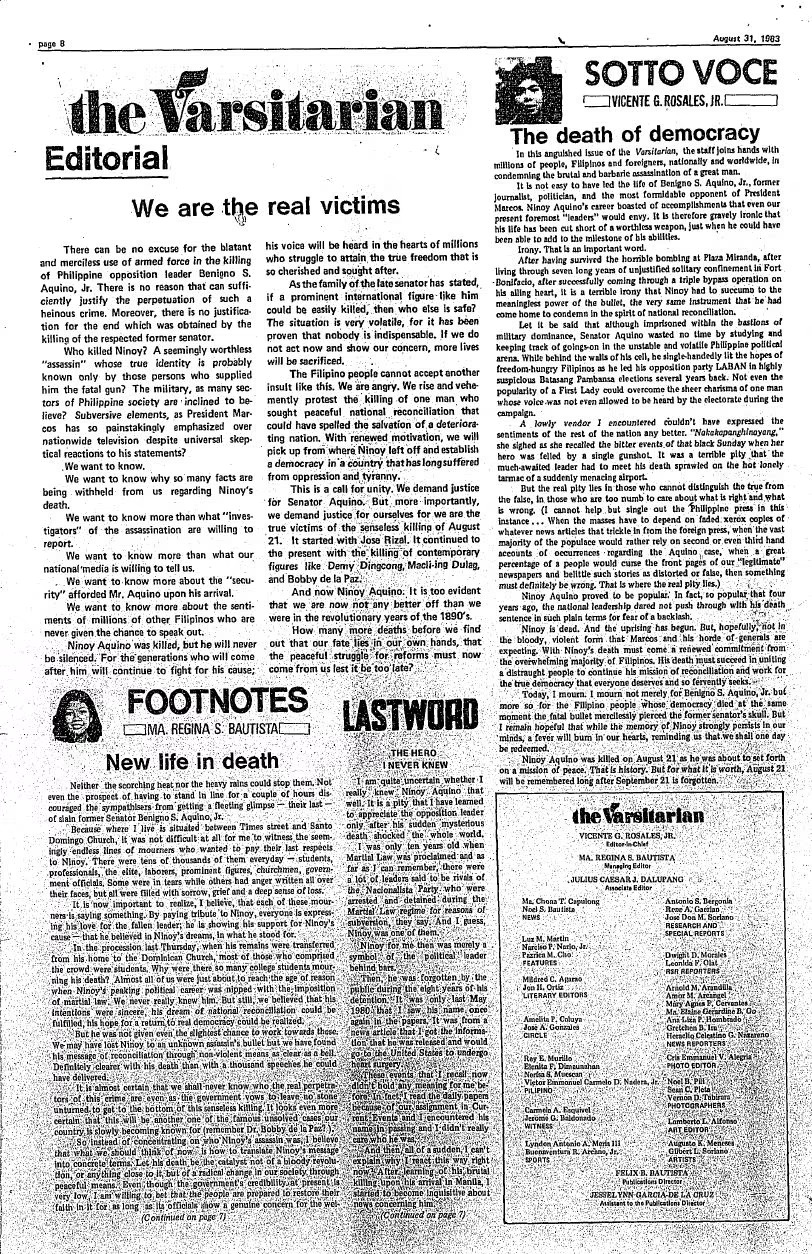
Op-ed page of the August 31, 1983 edition.

Previously limited to publishing articles on university issues, The Varsitarian started reporting on national issues as well during the 1960s and 1970s.

During the presidency of Ferdinand Marcos Sr., the newspaper published articles urging Thomasians to oppose political repression and covered opposition figures, despite caution from university officials. The massive funeral procession for the assassinated former senator Benigno "Ninoy" Aquino Jr., largely ignored by the state-controlled press, was put on the front page of the August 31, 1983 edition. The staff volunteered with the National Citizens' Movement for Free Elections (NAMFREL) to monitor the 1986 snap election. The publication subsequently covered the EDSA People Power Revolution in February 1986 and the end of the Marcos regime.

In 2001, the Varsitarian received a grant under the Truth Awards for Investigative Journalism of the Institute on Church and Social Issues of Ateneo de Manila University, for an investigation into zoning and building-code violations in Manila's University Belt. The resulting multi-part report was later republished by Newsbreak magazine. The project became part of a continuing emphasis on investigative and accountability journalism in the publication's coverage of the university and issues affecting the Thomasian community, including subsequent reporting on university governance, student welfare and organizations, and major controversies.

In March 2001, a Varsitarian article with information obtained from whistleblower Mark Welson Chua was published, detailing alleged corruption in the university's ROTC corps. While this led to the sacking of the commandant and his staff, Chua started receiving death threats. Chua's corpse was later found in the Pasig River, with the autopsy showing that he was still alive when he was dumped into the murky waters. Chua's killing intensified calls for reforms to the ROTC program. Congress subsequently enacted the National Service Training Program Act of 2001, which made ROTC one of several components through which college students could fulfill their national service requirement.

Amid the national debate on the merits of the Reproductive Health bill, The Varsitarian published in September 2012 an editorial condemning the proposed law, and calling the professors from Ateneo de Manila University and De La Salle University who were in favor of the measure as " intellectual pretenders and interlopers." The editorial went viral and elicited various reactions among social media users. With feedback and reactions to the article turning out to be mostly negative, the paper's adviser issued an apology but added that such words were needed to deliver the message with emphasis. The university disowned the portion of the editorial that called the pro-RH bill professors "intellectual pretenders and interlopers," saying that while it supports the paper's opposition to the bill, that portion of the editorial "does not bear the university's imprimatur," as the paper is accorded editorial independence.

The Varsitarian covered the death of University of Santo Tomas Faculty of Civil Law freshman Horacio “Atio” Castillo III, who died after undergoing initiation rites of the Aegis Juris Fraternity in September 2017, as well as the investigations and legal proceedings that followed. Its coverage included the university’s expulsion of eight law students linked to the case, forensic evidence recovered during the investigation, and calls by Castillo’s parents for accountability from university and law school officials. The publication also maintained a timeline of developments in the case. In October 2024, it reported that a Manila court had convicted 10 Aegis Juris members of violating the Anti-Hazing Law and sentenced them to reclusion perpetua, concluding a trial that lasted nearly seven years.

=== Coverage of papal visits ===
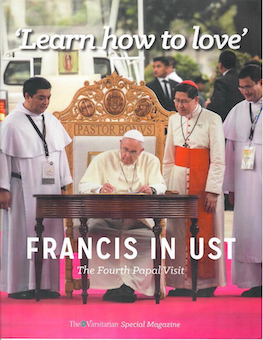
Cover of special magazine for Pope Francis' visit to UST, December 2016.

The Varsitarian has documented the four papal visits to UST: those of St. Paul VI in 1970, St. John Paul II in 1981 and 1995, and Pope Francis in 2015. It released a special edition for St. John Paul II's 1981 visit, during which he presided over the beatification of Lorenzo Ruiz, the first beatification ceremony held outside the Vatican.

A special issue accompanied St. John Paul II's 1995 visit during the Philippines' hosting of World Youth Day, and the publication issued a retrospective tribute following his death in 2005. For Pope Francis' visit to UST in January 2015, the Varsitarian published the special issue “Learn How to Love: Francis in UST, The Fourth Papal Visit,” documenting his encounter with the university community. Reporters and photographers went to Tacloban, Leyte to cover Francis' encounter with Super Typhoon Yolanda victims.

The paper's editor-in-chief, Karina Torralba, delivered the message on behalf of young people during the 1995 visit of St. John Paul II.

=== Recognition ===
The Varsitarian's masthead on its 80th anniversary.

The Cultural Center of the Philippines' Encyclopedia for the Arts has an entry for The Varsitarian, the only school paper in the country to be listed.

The Varsitarian has received multiple honors in U.S. collegiate journalism competitions, winning eight College Media Association (CMA) Pinnacle Awards in 2025 and seven CMA Apple Awards and a national Society of Professional Journalists Mark of Excellence Award in 2026.

In October 2026, The Varsitarian received the Newsmagazine/Newspaper Pacemaker Award from the Associated Collegiate Press. The Pacemakers are often called the Pulitzers of student journalism. The Varsitarian also received a Pacemaker finalist citation for the multiplatform category.

The publication has also been cited by the Philippine Student Quill Awards, the Catholic Mass Media Awards, the Unyon ng mga Manunulat sa Pilipinas, and De La Salle University's Scholarum Awards.

== Website and digital media ==
The Varsitarian launched its website in 2000 to expand its readership beyond the University, particularly among alumni in the Philippines and abroad. The website was initially hosted under the UST domain before moving to its own domain, varsitarian.net.

In 2015, the publication adopted a digital-first strategy under which most news and other content were published online before appearing in print. The shift reduced the publication's reliance on its print edition and expanded the use of its website and social media accounts for the distribution of news and other content. A revamped site was launched on December 19, 2016.

As of August 2026, the publication's Facebook page, created in June 2009, had more than 300,000 followers, with content of national significance regularly picked up by mainstream news media.

== Stylebook ==
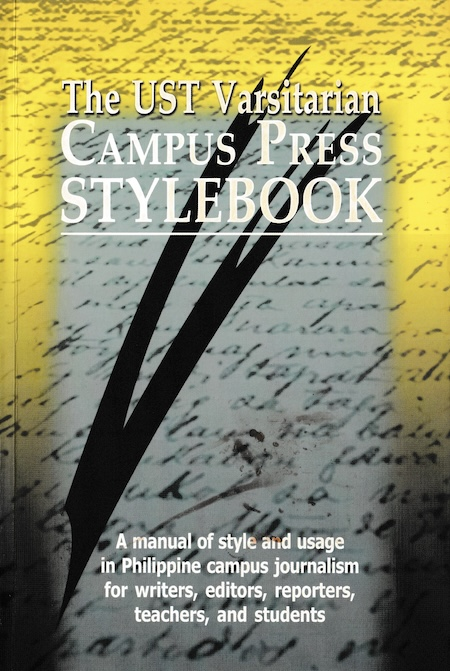
The Varsitarian Campus Press Stylebook.

In 2002, the Varsitarian published the UST Varsitarian Campus Press Stylebook: A Manual of Style and Usage in Philippine Campus Journalism for Writers, Editors, Reporters, Teachers, and Students, a guide to English-language journalistic writing and editing. The book was edited by Varsitarian publications adviser Joselito B. Zulueta and published jointly by the student newspaper and the UST Publishing House.

The stylebook was launched on October 24, 2002, during the fourth Inkblots national campus journalism fellowship, as part of the newspaper's 75th anniversary activities. The Varsitarian described it as the first style guide published in book form by a Philippine campus newspaper.

== Extra-editorial activities ==
=== Inkblots ===
The Varsitarian hosts the annual Inkblots, a national journalism workshop for campus journalists. The first Inkblots, organized by the editor-in-chief, Christian Esguerra, was held in 1999 in UST. In 2009, its lecturers were Apolinario, Philippine Daily Inquirer columnist Conrado de Quiros, Tempo entertainment editor Nestor Cuartero, and University of the Philippines vice president for public affairs Cristina Pantoja-Hidalgo, among others. In its 2011 edition, lecturers included musician and journalist Lourd de Veyra, Philippine Star columnist Quinito Henson, Manila Bulletin columnist Vim Nadera, GMA TV news reporter Cesar Apolinario, and GMANews.tv cartoonist Manix Abrera.

=== UST National Campus Journalism Awards ===
The UST National Campus Journalism Awards (UNCJA) recognizes outstanding student journalism across the Philippines in in-depth reporting, editorial writing, and feature writing. The UNCJA became part of the Inkblots closing ceremonies in 2015. Previous winners include The Philippine Collegian and Tinig ng Plaridel of the University of the Philippines Diliman, Ateneo de Manila University's The GUIDON, and De La Salle University's The LaSallian.

=== Pautakan ===
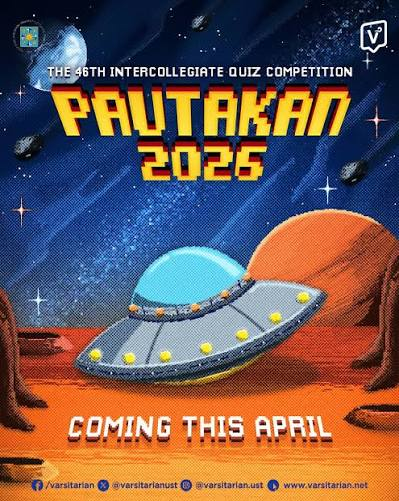
Social media poster of The Varsitarian's Pautakan 2026 quiz competition.

The Varsitarian organizes the Philippines' longest-running campus-based quiz contest called Pautakan. Almost all of the universities' constituent colleges and faculties participate in the event. The contest is divided into team and individual categories.

=== Ustetika ===
Ustetika is the country's longest-running university-based literary competition, founded by Vim Nadera in 1986. It bestows UST's highest literary award for students, the Rector's Literary Award. In 1997, the 1st Parangal Hagbong was introduced during the 13th Ustetika Awards to pay tribute to two great Thomasian writers, Rolando Tinio and Rogelio Sicat.

=== Creative Writing Workshop ===
The Creative Writing Workshop started as the Fiction Workshop in 2004. Its name was officially changed in 2013, its ninth year. It is an exclusive workshop, facilitated by premier poets and fiction writers, for 12 to 16 Thomasians. Some of the panelists who have facilitated the workshop include Mookie Katigbak-Lacuesta, Carlomar Daoana, Jun Cruz Reyes, Eros Atalia, Joselito Delos Reyes, Rebecca Añonuevo, and Vim Nadera.

=== Cinevita ===
The paper formerly hosted the Cinevita Film Festival, an annual film program, beginning 2007. Its 2011 lineup included films Peñafrancia: Ikaw ang Pagibig by Marilou Diaz-Abaya and produced by the Dominican Order chronicling the life of Saint Dominic, Gil Portes's Two Funerals, Milo Tolentino's Andong, Blogog, Orasyon, P, Demographic Winter, the winner of the UST Quadricentennial short film contest The 13th Day: The Story of Fatima, and The Rite.

== Chief editors ==
The list below was drawn up from staff boxes of previous issues in the publication's print and microfilm archives:

- Pablo T. Anido (January–March 1928)
- Jose Villa Panganiban (1928–1930)
- Ricardo C. Dulay (1930–1931)
- Efren C. Peña (1931–1932)
- Virgilio Floresca (April–June 1932)
- Rafael David Jr. (July 1932–1934)
- Virgilio Pobre-Yñigo (1934–1935)
- Teodoro F. Valencia (1935–1936)
- Pedro A. Revilla (1936–1937)
- Rufino R. Pascual (June–October 1937)
- Juan T. Ataviado (November 1937–June 1938, Board of Editors)
- Zacarias P. Nuguid Jr. (November 1937–June 1938, Board of Editors)
- Jose L. Guevara (November 1937–June 1938, Board of Editors)
- Dion Castillo-Yñigo (December 1938–June 1939)
- Andres E. Francia (1939–1940)
- Bonifacio B. Bondoc (1940–1941)
- Miguel V. Casals (April–May 1941)
- Francisco de Leon (June–December 1941, Board of Editors)
- Manuel Salak Jr. (June–December 1941, Board of Editors; 1947)
- Antonio M. Molina (June–December 1945)
- Eleno Mencias (December 1945–1946)
- Santiago Artiaga Jr. (1946–1947)
- Francisco Sionil Jose (1948–1949)
- Constante C. Roldan (1949–1950)
- Gloria C. Garchitorena (April–May 1950, Board of Editors)
- Eric C. Giron (April–May 1950, Board of Editors)
- Antonio R. Infante (April–May 1950, Board of Editors)
- Ramon J. Lopez (1951–1952)
- Vicente J.A. Rosales Sr. (1952–1953, 1954–1955)
- Benjamin E. Agarao (1953–1954)
- Julio S. Macaranas (1955–1957)
- Bienvenido M. Cube (1957–1958)
- Herminigildo A. Azarcon (1958–1960)
- Jose T. Flores (1960–1962)
- Virginia Jean M. Pope (1962–1964)
- Ma. Cristina L. Pantoja (1964–1965)
- Aurelio G. Pangilinan (June–December 1965)
- Bernardo C. Bernardo (1966–1967)
- Alfredo Marquez (1967–1968)
- Hernando A. Masangkay (1968–1969)
- Hernando V. Gonzales II (1969–1970)
- Rosalinda M. de Leon (June–December 1970)
- Josefina D. Dawatis (December 1970–July 1971, Board of Editors)
- Carolina A. Nuñez (December 1970–July 1971, Board of Editors; July–October 1971; December 1971–1972)
- Ricardo R. Santi (December 1970–July 1971, Board of Editors; October–December 1971, Board of Editors)
- Socorro E. Fuentecilla (1971, Board of Editors)
- Concepcion M. Alano (1971, Board of Editors)
- Ma. Corazon S. Evangelista (1972–1973)
- Gloria S. Castro (1974–1975)
- Regina B. Jimenez (1975–1976)
- Jesselynn L. Garcia (1976–1977)
- Oscar F. Picazo (1977–1978)
- Maria Angelica S. Bautista (1978–1979)
- Eugenio Jose F. Ramos (1979–1980)
- Saturnino P. Javier (1980–July 1981)
- Benjamin G. Co (August 1981–1982, Board of Editors)
- Vicente G. Rosales Jr. (August 1981–1982, Board of Editors)
- Anniela R. Yu (August 1981–1982, Board of Editors)
- Vicente G. Rosales Jr. (1982–1984)
- Maria Regina S. Bautista (1984–1985)
- Julius Caesar J. Dalupang (1985–1986)
- Noel Martin S. Bautista (1986–1987)
- Victor Emmanuel Carmelo Nadera Jr. (1987–1988)
- Robin S. Sarlabus (1988–1989)
- Andres B. Saracho (May 1989)
- Lea Marie C. Yap (1989–1990)
- Caesar R. Certeza (1990–1991)
- Ulpiano B. Dulguime (1991–1992)
- Karina D. Torralba (1992–1995)
- Don Robespierre C. Reyes (1995–1997, Board of Editors)
- Elizabeth B. Mapula (1996–1997, Board of Editors)
- Joseph Arisreed A. Marquez (1996–1997, Board of Editors)
- Henry Barrameda (April–May 1997; 1997–1998, Board of Editors)
- Christian V. Esguerra (1998–2000)
- Felipe F. Salvosa II (2000–2001)
- Reyann V. Kong (2001–2002)
- Marlon M. Castor (2002–2003)
- John Ferdinand T. Buen (2003–2004, Editorial Board)
- Joanne G. Fajardo (2003–2004, Editorial Board)
- Dexter R. Matilla (2003–2004, Editorial Board)
- Eldric Paul A. Peredo (2004–2006)
- Nicolo F. Bernardo (2006–2007)
- Andrew Isiah P. Bonifacio (2007–2008, Executive Editor)
- Anthony Andrew G. Divinagracia (2007–2008, Executive Editor; 2008-2009)
- Emil Karlo A. Dela Cruz (2009–2010)
- Cliff Harvey C. Venzon (2010–2011)
- Alexis Ailex C. Villamor Jr. (2011–2012)
- Rafael L. Antonio (2012–2013)
- Lorenzo Luigi T. Gayya (2013–2014)
- Ralph Joshua D.R. Hernandez (2014–2015, Editorial Board; May 2015)
- Gracelyn A. Simon (2014–2015, Editorial Board)
- Sarah Mae Jenna A. Ramos (2014–2015, Editorial Board)
- Lord Bien G. Lelay (2015–2016)
- Kathryn V. Baylon (2016–2017)
- Amierielle Anne A. Bulan (2017–2018)
- Christian Delano M. Deiparine (2018–2019)
- Eugene Dominic V. Aboy (2019–2020)
- John Ezekiel J. Hirro (2020–2024)
- Logan Kal-El M. Zapanta (2024–2025)
- Chalssea Kate C. Echegoyen (2025–2026)
- Amanda Luella A. Rivera (2026–)

== Notable alumni ==
Apart from journalists, editors, columnists and writers, alumni of The Varsitarian include National Artists, public officials, physicians, lawyers and members of the clergy.

- Eugenia Apostol, founder of the Philippine Daily Inquirer
- Bienvenido Lumbera, National Artist for Literature
- Francisco Sionil Jose, National Artist for Literature
- Paz Latorena, poet, author and teacher
- Ophelia Dimalanta, poet and dean of the UST Faculty of Arts and Letters
- Cirilo Bautista, National Artist for Literature
- J. Elizalde Navarro, National Artist for Visual Arts
- Rogelio Sicat, novelist and writer
- Cristina Pantoja-Hidalgo, writer, S.E.A. Write Awardee
- Archbishop Artemio Casas, Archdiocese of Jaro
- Fr. Rolando dela Rosa, O.P., Rector of UST (1990–1998, 2008–2012), chairman of the Commission on Higher Education (2004–2005)
- Fr. Virgilio Ojoy, O.P., former Vice-Rector of UST
- Fr. Nicanor Lalog, former GMA News reporter, priest for the Diocese of Malolos
- Fr. Albert Alejo, S.J., anthropologist, human rights advocate and activist
- Fr. Isidro Marinay, Archdiocese of Manila
- Emmanuel Pelaez, Vice-President of the Philippines
- Jose Feria, associate justice of the Supreme Court
- Francisco Tatad, former senator and minister of information
- Arsenio Lacson, former mayor of Manila
- Jose Burgos Jr., journalist, editor, founder of Ang Pahayagang Malaya
- Teodoro Valencia, columnist and radio commentator
- Jose Guevara, columnist and editor
- Crispin Maslog, communication scholar and founder of Silliman University's journalism school
- Arnaldo Moss Jr., journalist and editor
- Exequiel Molina, journalist and editor
- Sr. Delia Coronel, folklorist, educator
- Juan T. Gatbonton, journalist and editor
- Jesus Sison, former Press Secretary
- Alice Colet Villadolid, former New York Times correspondent and Palace spokesperson
- Antonio Lopez, business journalist, publisher and editor of BizNews Asia
- Jullie Yap-Daza, columnist and editor
- Amado "Jake" Macasaet, editor of Malaya newspaper
- Bernardo Bernardo, actor
- Diego Cagahastian, journalist
- Cresencio Maralit, journalist and national police official
- Reynaldo Panaligan, journalist
- Victor Emmanuel Carmelo Nadera, poet, essayist, S.E.A. Write awardee
- Michael M. Coroza, poet and S.E.A. Write awardee
- Rina Jimenez-David, columnist
- Nestor Cuartero, member, Movie and Television Review and Classification Board
- Joselito B. Zulueta, journalist and chair of UST Department of Journalism
- Dr. Saturnino Javier, medical director, Makati Medical Center
- Lourd de Veyra, musician and broadcaster
- Christian Esguerra, political journalist and commentator
