= College Editors Guild of the Philippines =

Alliance of collegiate student publications

- Spokesperson: Brell Lacerna
- Founded: July 25, 1931
- Colours
- Newspaper: The National Guilder

The College Editors Guild of the Philippines is an alliance of collegiate student publications in the Philippines. It is the oldest and only-existing publications alliance in the Asia-Pacific. It was established on July 25, 1931. It is also a member and a founding organization of Kabataan Partylist.

== History ==
=== Establishment and early years ===
The CEGP was established on July 25, 1931, on through a congregation of the editors of four college student publications: The National of National University, The Varsitarian of the University of Santo Tomas, the Philippine Collegian of the University of the Philippines, and The Guidon of Ateneo de Manila University. The guild was established in order to unite campus publications and hone their skills. It was also Ernesto Rodriguez Jr.'s, the editor-in-chief of The National, birthday that day. Wenceslao Vinzons served as its first president, from 1931 to 1932.

Its progressive roots were first noted on December 9, 1932, when Rodriguez and Vinzons led the campus journalists and the youth in opposing a bill that would grant higher salaries to members of the Lower House in the Philippines.

=== Rise of student activism ===
During the rise of the student movement in the Philippines during the 1960s, the CEGP was greatly transformed into a union of publications and journalists that linked journalism with national issues. Philippine Collegian editor-in-chief Antonio Tagamolila, as he was elected for CEGP Presidency, said that “the victory of progressives is the signal of the birth of a new, progressive College Editors Guild of the Philippines.”

=== Martial law under Ferdinand Marcos ===
Then-dictator Ferdinand Marcos was able to shut down campus publications when he declared Martial Law in 1972. The likes of Tagamollila joined the underground resistance back them.

Despite the Martial Law restrictions, there were various efforts by student journalists to reconstitute the CEGP throughout the middle to late 1970s. Mapua University journalist Leopoldo "Babes" Calixto Jr. attempted to rally campus journalists to revive the CEGP as early as 1974. Later, journalists Joe Burgos and Estelita Juco attempted to reconstitute the CEGP within the Metro Manila area as the Metropolitan Association of College Editors.

Eventually, the CEGP was properly reinstated in the early 1980s.

CEGP was also part of the Second People Power Uprising.

=== Recent history ===
During the early administration of President Gloria Macapagal Arroyo, a youth initiative called Youth Movement for Justice and Meaningful Change, composed of Anakbayan, League of Filipino Students, Student Christian Movement of the Philippines, CEGP, and National Union of Students of the Philippines met at the office of Anakbayan in Padre Noval, Sampaloc, Manila, to discuss plans to advance the interests of the Filipino youth. Talks were made due to the disillusionment brought by the new administration. Eventually, these talks culminated in the formation of Anak ng Bayan Youth Party (Kabataan Partylist) on June 19, 2001, coinciding with the birthday of José Rizal.

Its progressiveness has made it known for advocating press freedom. Campus Press Freedom Day in the Philippines is celebrated every July 25. CEGP is one of the groups red-tagged by the Armed Forces of the Philippines.

== List of CEGP Presidents ==
Date of Tenure	Name	Publication	College/University	Notes	References
1931-1932	Wenceslao Vinzons	The Philippine Collegian	University of the Philippines Diliman		
1932-1934	Ernesto Rodriguez Jr.	The National	National University	Served two terms in 1932-1933 and 1933-1934 while Editor-in-chief of The National	
1934-1937	Ernesto Rodriguez Jr.	The Varsitarian	University of Santo Tomas		
1937-1938	Ernesto Rodriguez Jr.	The Barrister	Philippine Law School		
1938-1939	Helena Z. Benitez	Philippine Women's Magazine	Philippine Women's University		
1939-1940	Leon O. Ty	The Barrister	Philippine Law School		
1940-1941	Dion Castillo-Inigo	The Varsitarian	University of Santo Tomas		
1941-	Manuel E. Buenafe	The Barrister	Philippine Law School	No elections during the Second World War	
1946-1947	Ricardo R. Dela Cruz	The Advocate	Far Eastern University		
1947-1948	Enrique M. Joaquin	The Advocate	Far Eastern University		
1948-1949	Leonardo B. Perez	The Philippine Collegian	University of the Philippines Diliman		
1949-1950	Augusto Caesar Espiritu	The Philippine Collegian	University of the Philippines Diliman		
1950-1951	Vicente C. Coloso	The Advocate	Far Eastern University		
1951-1952	Ramon Mitra Jr.	The Bedan	San Beda College		
1952-1953	Federico V. Azcarate	The Quezonian	Manuel L. Quezon University		
1953-1954	Ignacio Debuqe Jr.	The Philippine Collegian	University of the Philippines Diliman		
1954-1955	Salvador G. Orara	The Quezonian	Manuel L. Quezon University		
1955-1956	Jorge A. Lorredo Jr.	The Guidon	Ateneo de Manila University		
	Jeremias Flores	The Barrister	Philippine Law School		
1956-1957	Godofredo C. Camacho	The Advocate	Far Eastern University		
1957-1958	Arturo S. Bernales	The Barrister	Philippine Law School		
1958-1959	Lazaro R. Banag Jr.	Arellano Standard	Arellano University		
1959-1960	Edmundo Libid	The Quezonian	Manuel L. Quezon University		
1960-1961	Juanito M. Garay	The Lyceum	Lyceum of the Philippines		
1961-1963	Evelio S. Jayaon	Arellano Standard	Arellano University	Served two consecutive terms as President	
	Jose Conrado Benitez	The Guidon	Ateneo de Manila University		
1963-1964	Eduardo F. Marfori	The Lyceum	Lyceum of the Philippines		
1964-1965	Salvador Carlota	The Philippine Collegian	University of the Philippines Diliman		
	Eduardo F. Marfori	The Lyceum	Lyceum of the Philippines		
1965-1966	Marcelo Ablaza	The Philippine Collegian	University of the Philippines Diliman		
1966-1967	Daniel T. Florida Jr.	The Quezonian	Manuel L. Quezon University		
	Wilfredo T. Segovia	The Augustinian Mirror	University of San Agustin		
1967-1968	Jaime J. Yambao	The Philippine Collegian	University of the Philippines Diliman		
1968-1969	Adolfo Paglinawan	The Bedan	San Beda College		
1969-1970	Roberto V. Araos	Law Enforcement Journal	Philippine College of Criminology		
1970-1971	Fred Bat-og	Wesneco Torch	West Negros College		
1971-1972	Antonio Tagamolila	The Philippine Collegian	University of the Philippines Diliman		
1972-	Senen D. Glorioso	La Sallian	De La Salle University	All organizations were suspended during Martial law	
1981-1982	Jose Virgilio Bautista	The Philippine Collegian	University of the Philippines Diliman		
1982-1983	Oscar V. Campomanes	The Outcrop	University of the Philippines Baguio		
1983-1984	Marichu C. Lambino	The Philippine Collegian	University of the Philippines Diliman		
1984-1985	Clement Bacani	The Bedan	San Beda College		
1985-1986	Benjamin Pimentel Jr.	The Philippine Collegian	University of the Philippines Diliman		
1986-1987	Raul N. Laguitan	The Quezonian	Manuel L. Quezon University		
1987-1988	Angelo Jimenez	The Philippine Collegian	University of the Philippines Diliman		
1988-1989	Victor Rey Fumar	The Torch	Philippine Normal University		
1989-1990	Raymond C. Burgos	The Quezonian	Manuel L. Quezon University		
1990-1991	Raul Dancel	The Bedan	San Beda College		
1991-1994	Teodoro Casino	UPLB Perspective	University of the Philippines Los Banos	Served multiple terms	
1994-1998	Prestoline S. Suyat	The Weekly Dawn	University of the East	Served two two-year terms	
1998-2000	Ruth G. Cerventes	The Scholastican	St. Scholastica's College		
2000-2002	Rey Perez Asis	The Manila Collegian	University of the Philippines Manila		
2002-2004	Ronalyn Olea	The Lyceum Independent Sentinel	Lyceum of the Philippines		
2004-2008	Jose Cosido	The Catalyst	Polytechnic University of the Philippines	Served two terms	
2008-2010	Vijae O. Alquisola	EARIST Technozette	EARIST		
2010-2012	Trina Federis	The Paulinian	St. Paul University Manila		
2012-2014	Pauline Gidget Estella	Philippine Collegian	University of the Philippines Diliman		
2014-2016	Marc Lino J. Abila	The LPU Independent Sentinel	Lyceum of the Philippines		
2016-2019	Jose Mari Callueng	The National	National University		
2019-2021	Daryl Angelo Baybado	The Varsitarian	University of Santo Tomas		
