= Antonio Zumel =

Filipino journalist, activist, and revolutionary

- Born: Antonio De Leon Zumel II; August 10, 1932; Laoag, Ilocos Norte, Philippine Islands
- Died: August 13, 2001 (aged 69); Utrecht, Netherlands
- Other names: Manuel Romero; Puri Balando; Jose Mabalacat
- Education: Lyceum of the Philippines University
- Occupations: Prominent Journalist, Political Activist
- Organization(s): National Press Club (Philippines); Movement of Concerned Citizens for Civil Liberties; National Democratic Front of the Philippines
- Spouse: Mela Castillo
- Children: Malaya Zumel; Veronica Zumel; Antonio Zumel III
- Parents: Antonio Zumel Sr. (father); Basilisa de Leon (mother)
- Family: Maria Luisa (elder sister); Jose Ma. Carlos (younger brother); Rosario Angeles (younger sister); Eduardo (younger brother); Ma. Consuelo (younger sister)

Antonio De Leon Zumel II (August 10, 1932 - August 13, 2001), also known by his nicknames Tony, Manong, Ching and Antumel, was a Filipino journalist, activist, and leftist revolutionary. He was two-time President of the National Press Club of the Philippines before going underground in 1972 at the start of the Marcos dictatorship. In 1990, he was elected Chairperson of the National Democratic Front of the Philippines in absentia, and was a senior adviser to the NDFP negotiating panel from 1994 until his death in 2001.

In 2016, Zumel was honored by having his name inscribed on the wall of remembrance at the Bantayog ng mga Bayani, which, after an extensive vetting process, posthumously recognizes the individuals who fought against the authoritarian regime of Ferdinand Marcos.

== Early life ==
Zumel was born into a comfortable family in Laoag, Ilocos Norte to Antonio Zumel Sr., a lawyer with his own practice, and Basilisa de Leon, former school teacher, the second of six children. Family members called him by his nickname "Ching". Their family owned the only car in Sarrat, Ilocos Norte.

He described his father as having a "relatively good law practice," which allowed him to send his children to a private school, the Holy Ghost Academy, for elementary education. His parents taught him the virtues of "honesty and integrity," and were against extravagance of any kind.

Zumel's father died in 1945 when he was 13 years old. His father's death left a toll on the family, and his mother struggled to raise him and his siblings. Basilisa de Leon had to sell her jewelry, and eventually, parcels of land that the family had bought over the years.

In 1947, Zumel moved to Manila to study high-school in the Far Eastern University, while living with "a spinster aunt" who ran a boarding house.

To support his studies, he took up odd-jobs to make an income. Zumel described his experience working in the pier as hard, having to work 24 hour shifts before resting the next day.

At one point, Zumel worked at a construction job where he performed physical labor such as running errands, mixing cement, and assisting carpenters and masons. He was not paid for this job, leaving an impression on him that will last his entire life.

== Journalism career ==
In 1949, his aunt's boarding house business wasn't doing well. Zumel thought of dropping out of school when his uncle, Salvador Peña, got him a job as a copyboy at The Philippine Herald. This gave him the opportunity to continue on to college, working the day shift at the Herald while attending night classes at the Lyceum of the Philippines University. Zumel was barely 17 at the time and lied about his age to be able to work.

During this time, Zumel observed the editors, copy readers, and reporters working at the Herald while continuing to perform menial tasks and reading up on journalism books that he bought. Manuel Almario, a journalist who knew Zumel during this time, described him as "a very willing worker, cheerful, never complaining, very eager to know the profession." During this time, one of the journalists, Teddy Benigno, was forming a union and invited Zumel to be a part of, which he early agreed to. He had to hide his union involvement from Peña, who was personnel manager at the time.

After two years, Zumel was promoted from copyboy to proofreader. He dropped out of college, believing it unnecessary since he already had a good job. He worked in the Mechanical Department of the Herald and became close with the workers there. Two years later, in 1953, Zumel became a reporter and covered mostly crime and political stories.

His coverage of police, labor, and other political stories would inform his political views. Manuel Almario said of him that he "sympathized with the workers" as he covered stories for the Congress of Labor Organizations. From 1955, Zumel and his associates were active in the National Press Club, becoming "fixtures at the bar or restaurant."

=== Union organizing ===
By the 1960s, the Herald union led by Teddy Benigno had become inactive. Benigno had left the paper and those who remained had little interest in organizing work. Zumel took it up to himself to try and re-organize the union, alongside a "small core of close friends" from the Mabuhay and El Debate, two other publications also owned by Vicente Madrigal alongside Herald. Management caught wind of the idea and talked to Zumel, talking him out of pursuing a collective bargaining agreement for salary increases.

In 1962, the Herald was sold to the Soriano family, who owned San Miguel Corporation. Zumel's union registered with the Philippine Association of Free Labor Unions, headed by Cipriano Cid at the time. Zumel was vice-president of the union. In response, the new Herald management created a company union and affiliated it with the Philippine Transport and General Workers' Organization, headed by Roberto S. Oca.

Tensions rose, giving way to a CBA deadlock in September 1962, which led to a strike. The strike lasted three months and was unsuccessful, and ended with union members returning to work. Zumel took an active role in leading the strike, and one point, laying down on the road with fellow journalist Rey Veloso to block delivery vehicles from going out. Herald management, on the other hand, hired "armed goons from Bulacan and criminal elements from the urban poor community in Intramuros to create trouble at the picket line." In one incident, Zumel challenged a Captain Abad of the Soriano-owned security forces to a gunfight, which Abad refused.

=== Manila Bulletin and National Press Club President ===
After the strike, Zumel worked in the Herald for two and a half more years, for a total of 16 years. In 1965, he accepted an invitation from Ben Rodriguez, editor-in-chief of the Manila Bulletin. He would work in the Bulletin until the declaration of Martial law in the Philippines.

In the 1960s, Zumel also had an active role in the National Press Club. He managed to serve in its board of directors at least 12 times, before deciding to run as President in 1969. As President, he became involved with the national democratic movement, then at its infancy. He campaigned for the release of arrested staffers of Dumaguete Times, a publication in Negros Occidental. Three of these staffers, Hermie Garcia, Mila Astorga, and Vic Clemente, turned out to be members of Kabataang Makabayan and furnished Zumel with political materials from time to time, or sitting down for political discussions.

During this time, he also became chairman of the board of directors of the Amado V. Hernandez Foundation. Working with Antonio Tagamolila of the College Editors' Guild of the Philippines, they published the second edition of Jose Maria Sison's work, Struggle for National Democracy. He also became a member of the Communist Party of the Philippines under the National Press Bureau of the Party's General Secretariat, after Carolina Malay of Taliba and Satur Ocampo of Manila Times approached him in his NPC office.

Zumel opened the NPC to the growing mass movement, eventually allowing it to become some sort of a headquarters of the Movement for a Democratic Philippines. During and after the First Quarter Storm of 1970, the NPC served as a refuge for mass leaders from police and military assault, and as an open space for press conferences. He also passed a resolution "aligning the NPC with our people's movement for fundamental change in our society" in the NPC's 1970 national assembly, shortly before he was re-elected for a second term.

When President Ferdinand Marcos suspended the writ of habeas corpus in 1971, Zumel helped form the Movement of Concerned Citizens for Civil Liberties alongside personalities such as Senators Jose W. Diokno and Lorenzo Tañada in protest. Members of the NPC, including then President Amando Doronila of the Daily Mirror were marching in rallies alongside MCCCL.

== Martial law ==
On September 22, 1972, Zumel received a call from Joe de Vera that Minister of Defense Juan Ponce Enrile had been ambushed. Zumel said that "the whole thing sounded like a lot of bullshit," and told de Vera to get more details. That same night, he was drinking beer with friends at the National Press Club bar when soldiers locked down mass media offices, including the Bulletin. Marcos had declared Martial Law.

Zumel went underground that same night. Once underground, he assumed the nom de guerre of Ka KP and began working with the staff of the National Democratic Front of the Philippines' publication Liberation as early as October 1972, as well as its news agency, Balita ng Malayang Pilipinas. He was also part of the preparatory committee which established the NDFP on April 23, 1973. He also edited other regional newspapers such as Dangadang.

As early as July 1976, Zumel was slated to take on the reins of the CPP's official news publication, Ang Bayan and replace Sison as its editor-in-chief. However, complications including the arrest of New People's Army commander-in-chief Bernabe Buscayno in August 1976 hindered the formation of a new editorial staff. Zumel would officially become the editor-in-chief during the last quarter of 1976, expanding the editorial staff and recruiting former journalists like Malay.

Zumel implemented multiple changes to Ang Bayan, drawing from his years of journalistic experience. Ang Bayan began publishing biweekly, and staff of regional papers were deputized as Ang Bayan correspondents. News articles also followed a more journalistic style, following rules in news writing. Ang Bayan also began featuring human interest stories and letters to the editor during Zumel's time as editor-in-chief.

== Post-Marcos dictatorship ==
In the aftermath of the first People Power Revolution in February 1986 and the removal of Marcos from power, Zumel and other former journalists surfaced. He represented the NDFP as part of the first negotiating panel in 1986-7 in talks with the new Corazon Aquino government. Negotiations broke down however and Aquino pursued a total war strategy in dealing with the opposition.

In 1989, following threats to his family, Zumel was assigned to the Netherlands to undertake international relations work on behalf of the NDFP, as well as to seek medical assistance. He brought along his wife, Mela Castillo and their daughter, Malaya, with him to Europe, where he kept a semi-underground profile. However, in 1990, Philippine authorities caught wind of Zumel's activities and, after much publicity, fearing arrest should he return to the country, sought political asylum in the Netherlands. The request was granted by the Dutch government in 1997.

In 1990, he was elected in absentia to the position of chairperson of the NDFP, which he served until 1994. In 1994, he was made honorary chairman of the NDFP and senior advisor of the NDFP negotiating panel. He was living in exile during the events of the Second Great Rectification Movement, where he worked tirelessly to explain and clarify the re-affirmist position. He would go to forums organized by rejectionists and "counter-revolutionaries" to defend the re-affirm position and to "reach out to those whom he considered to be open to the correct line but who were temporarily confused or misled by the counter-revolutionaries."

== Later years and death ==
In 1998, Zumel suffered a severe stroke that caused partial paralysis. He underwent rehabilitation and learned to walk again. In 1999, the College Editors' Guild of the Philippines conferred the Marcelo H. del Pilar Award, its highest honor, to him.

His health continued to fail in the next years, before he died from kidney failure and complications due to diabetes on August 13, 2001, in the presence of his family. He was survived by his wife Mela Castillo, and two of his children, Veronica and Malaya.

== Personal life ==
As a journalist working for the Herald, Zumel was awarded a house-and-lot unit on Newsmen's Row in Project 8, Quezon City. However, Zumel opted to allow a bedridden colleague live in the house. Zumel recounted in 1986 that he was divorced from his first wife Virginia V. Zumel "due to a lack of political and personal compatibility, in large part because of [his] own faults and shortcomings." They had a son Antonio C. Zumel III.

In 1975, while part of the revolutionary underground, Zumel married Mela Castillo. They had a daughter, Malaya.

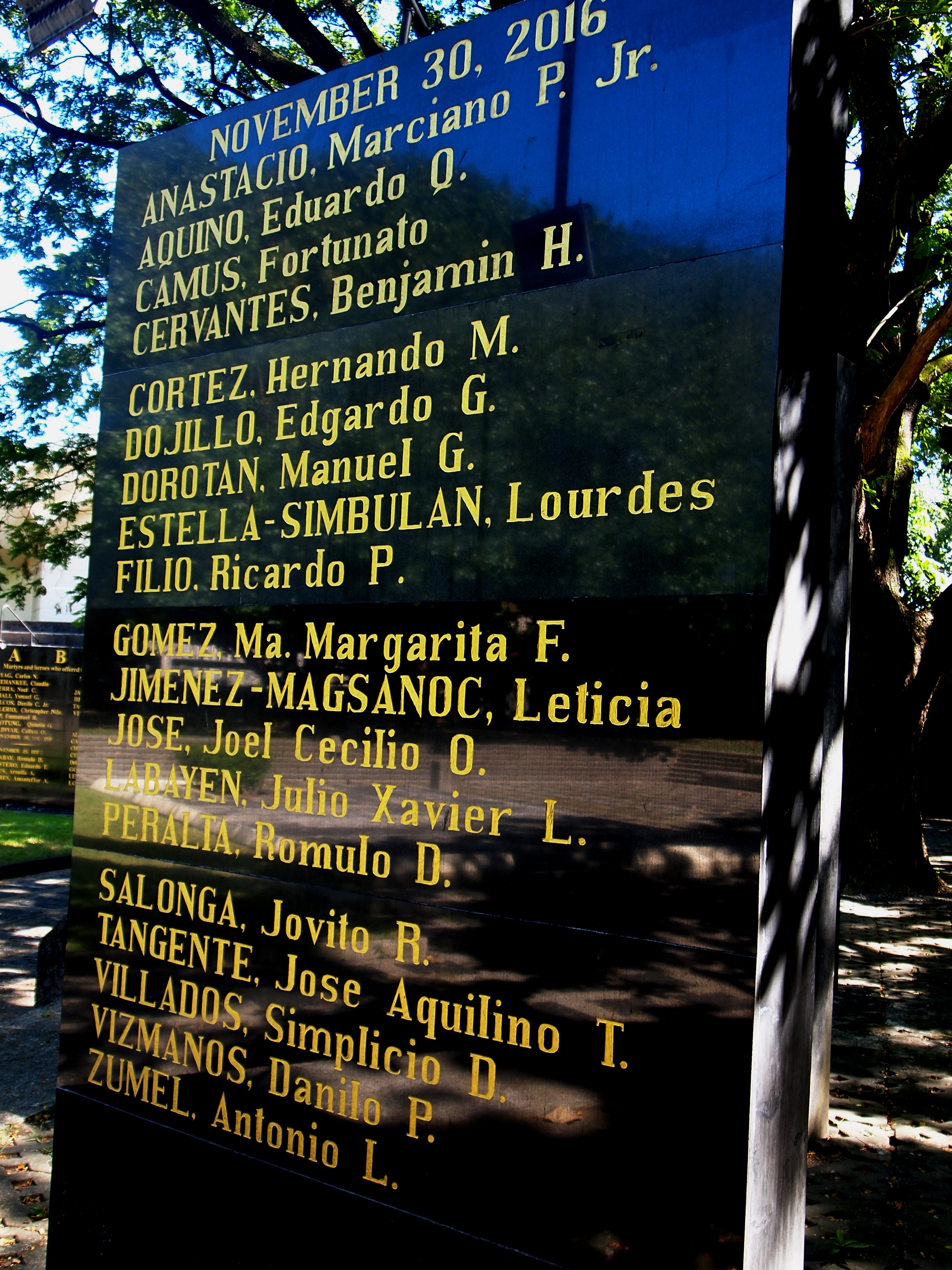
Detail of the Wall of Remembrance at the Bantayog ng mga Bayani, showing names from the 2016 batch of Bantayog Honorees, including that of Antonio Zumel.

Contemporaries described Zumel as "a loyal friend" that was "easygoing, friendly, and fun-loving, with a fondness for music and a healthy sense of humor." In his days in the Herald, he was closest to Olaf Giron and Abraham Vera. He was known to be a regular at the NPC bar, and was part of the "Batang Klub", a "coterie of NPC old-timers who had built up legends around their persona with their personal exploits and the way they elicited fear, respect, and endearment among their journalist colleagues." He kept his sense of humor as a revolutionary; one of his noms de guerre was KP, short for "katawang pangromansa" (born for romance), deprecating his lead, thin chest with a modest beer belly.

As a journalist, his work was considered to be impeccable. Even as a copyboy, co-workers and elder journalists encouraged him and thought that he would "go places" in journalism. He found his passion in journalism, which his sister described as "his niche in life."

While in exile, Zumel "gained the friendship and respect of many fellow refugees" during this time and was referred to as "the Filipini."

Zumel was fluent in English and his native Iloko. He forced himself to learn Filipino during his time underground, eventually becoming a fluent speaker and a competent writer in it.

== Legacy ==
Shortly after his death, the Antonio Zumel Center for Press Freedom was established on August 10, 2004, with the goal of "keeping Antonio Zumel's memory, journalistic examples and ethics alive." It also conducts training programs and research into the conditions of journalists and press-related issues.

A book of his writings was also released in 2004, entitled Radical Prose: Selected Writings of Antonio Zumel. The anthology includes articles from his time in the Philippines Herald and Manila Daily Bulletin, his writings while in the revolutionary underground, and selected works while in exile in the Netherlands.

In 2006, the Antonio Zumel Center for Press Freedom produced and released a documentary film about his life, titled He Never Wrote 30. It was screened at the 18th Cultural Center of the Philippines Awards for Alternative Film and Video.

In 2016, his name was added to the Bantayog ng mga Bayani, recognizing his role as a veteran journalist and key personality in the NDFP.
