= Antonio Tagamolila =

Filipino revolutionary (1950–1974)

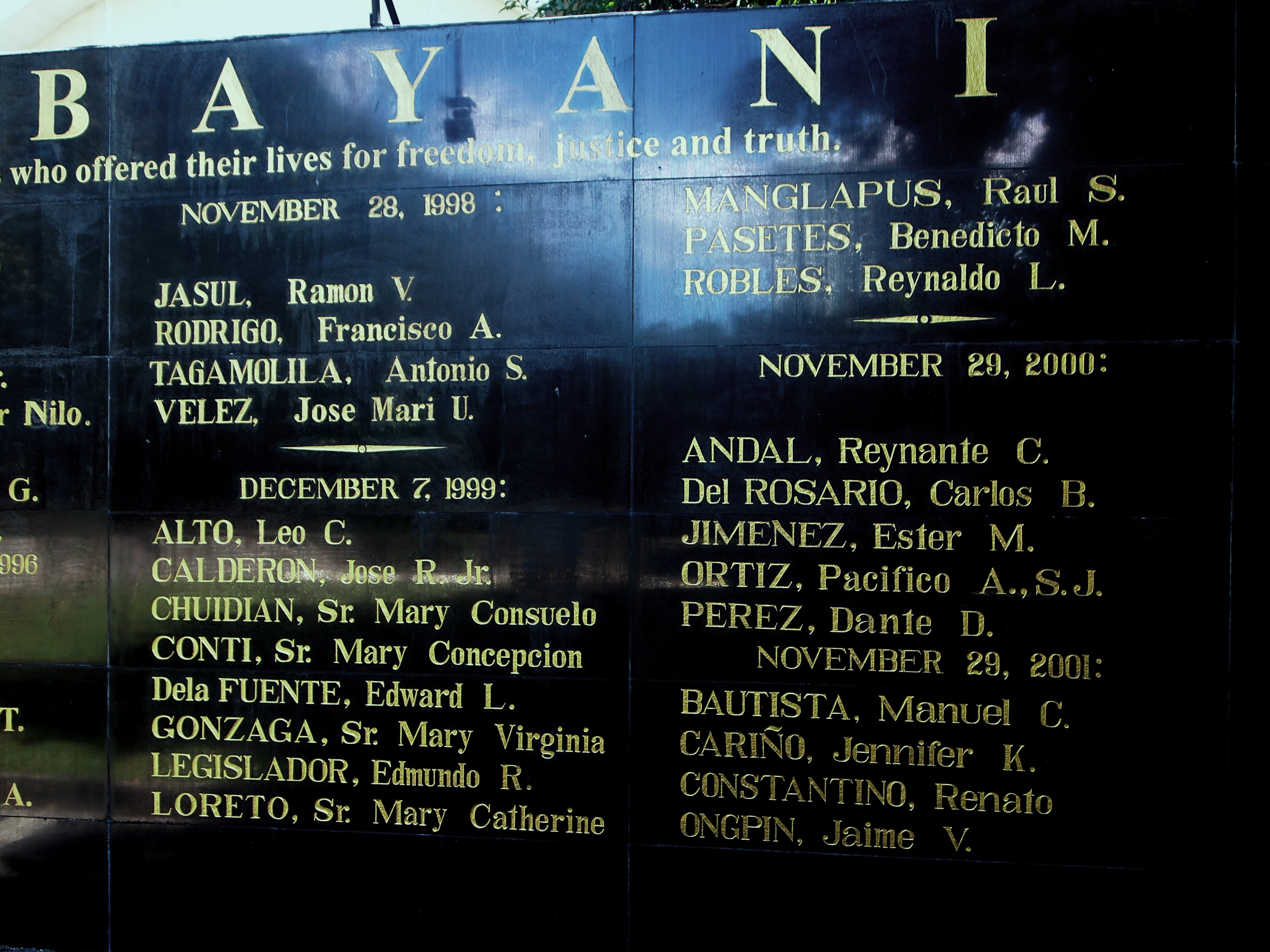
- Detail of the Wall of Remembrance at the Bantayog ng mga Bayani, showing names from the 1998 batch of Bantayog Honorees, including that of Antonio Tagamolila.
- Born: January 17, 1950; Iloilo City, Iloilo, Philippines
- Died: February 18, 1974 (aged 24); Libacao, Aklan, Philippines
- Education: University of the Philippines Diliman (BS)
- Occupations: Student journalist Activist
- Organization(s): College Editors' Guild of the Philippines; The Philippine Collegian; Kabataang Makabayan; Samahan ng Demokratikong Kabataan; New People's Army
- Spouse: Victoria Segui
- Children: 1
- Parents: Manuel Tagamolila (father); Casiana Sandoval (mother)
- Family: Crispin Tagamolila (brother) three more siblings

Antonio Sandoval Tagamolila (January 17, 1950 – February 18, 1974) was a Filipino activist, student journalist, and revolutionary who was active during the administration of President Ferdinand Marcos. He was the editor-in-chief of The Philippine Collegian and the president of the College Editors' Guild of the Philippines in 1971, as well as a member of Kabataang Makabayan. After the imposition of Martial law in 1972, Tagamolila joined the New People's Army. He was killed on February 18, 1975, in an encounter.

== Early life and education ==
Tagamolila was born on January 17, 1950, in Iloilo City to Manuel Tagamolila and Casiana Sandoval. He had an older brother, Crispin, and three other siblings. He was from a poor family: his father did not have a stable job and he was only able to pursue higher education because of scholarships. He studied at the La Paz Elementary School in Iloilo City, before moving to Quezon City to enroll at the University of the Philippines High School.

In college, he initially took up in engineering at the University of the Philippines Diliman before shifting to economics, thinking that the course would be more relevant to the nation's needs. He graduated in 1971.

Tagamolila's older brother, Crispin, was also a UP Diliman graduate. Crispin graduated in 1966 and joined the Philippine Military Academy, becoming a commissioned officer of the Armed Forces of the Philippines the next year. He would eventually grow disillusioned with the army and join the New People's Army, before being killed on April 16, 1972, in Echague, Isabela.

== Journalism and activism ==
In 1966, Antonio Tagamolila joined Kabataang Makabayan, and then, the Samahan ng Demokratikong Kabataan. He also became a writer for The Philippine Collegian, eventually becoming its editor-in-chief in 1971. He was also elected the national president of the College Editors' Guild of the Philippines, a nationwide alliance of student publications. During his time as CEGP president, Tagamolila pushed for the publication of more political and revolutionary articles in campus presses. He also published documents of the recently reestablished Communist Party of the Philippines, as well as articles by its chair Amado Guerrero, and other progressives in the Philippine Collegian. Creative works which reflected social reality and the discontent and revolutionary aspirations of the people also began to appear in the Collegian.

Tagamolila and the CEGP also cooperated with the Amado V. Hernandez foundation, headed by Antonio Zumel, in publishing the second edition of Guerrero's work, Struggle for National Democracy, in 1971.

== Martial law and death ==
After graduation, he married Victoria Segui in 1972. The two of them had a child together. He also worked a time at as a staff member at Romeo T. Capulong's office.

Ferdinand Marcos declared martial law on September 21, 1972. In November 1972, Tagamolila decided to go underground and join the New People's Army, making his way to Panay.

Tagamolila was killed in an encounter with military forces on February 18, 1974, in Libacao, Aklan province. Government troops attacked a hut where Tagamolila and his comrades, including Antonio Hilario and Rolando Luarca, were staying.
