= Jose Guevara =

Filipino journalist, political commentator and art collector

Jose ("Joe") L. Guevara (August 27, 1917 – December 2, 2002) was a Filipino journalist, political commentator and art collector. Guevara was born in Tanauan, Batangas and earned his pre-law and law degrees at University of Santo Tomas, and later earned a master's degree in journalism from the same university. He began his career in journalism in 1938 as the editor-in-chief of The Varsitarian, the student newspaper at his university. He briefly worked as an attorney in the law office of Jose P. Laurel, who was later president of the Philippines, before returning to journalism.

From 1938 until his death in 2002, he wrote a popular political column titled "Point of View" for the Manila Bulletin, the Philippines' largest English-language daily newspaper. He was also a contributor to the Manila Times. On April 6, 1954, while reporting for The Manila Times at a legislative session, he introduced Imelda Romualdez to then-congressman Ferdinand Marcos, and a romance between the two developed rapidly. Guevara was described as Marcos's "steady sidekick", and spent much time with the couple, reporting on their relationship which received much attention from society columnists. The couple were married 11 days later. On March 26, 1962, Guevera was appointed chairman of the newly-established Board of Censors for Motion Pictures by President Diosdado Macapagal; prior to becoming chairman, he had been involved in film censorship since 1953. He would resign from his position in early September 1965 in response to the board's sudden suspension of the film Iginuhit ng Tadhana (The Ferdinand E. Marcos Story) in his absence.

In 1991, he received an honorary doctorate from the Polytechnic University of the Philippines.

Guevara and his wife Nene also collected Filipino art for decades, accumulating works by many well-known artists, including Fernando Amorsolo, Ang Kiukok, Vicente Manansala, Guillermo Tolentino, Anita Magsaysay-Ho, Napoleon Abueva, Federico Aguilar Alcuaz, Botong Francisco, Eduardo Castrillo and Victorio Edades. Their extensive collection was auctioned off at the Léon Gallery in Makati in 2015.
