= Jose Villa Panganiban =

Filipino lexicographer and linguist (1903–1972)

Jose Villa Panganiban (June 12, 1903 – October 13, 1972) was a Filipino lexicographer, writer, professor, linguist, journalist, radio broadcaster, polyglot, translator, and author. He was the director of the Institute of National Language. (Note: Institute of National Language (INL; Surian ng Wikang Pambansa, SWP) was then under the Department of Education; now the Commission on the Filipino Language (Komisyon sa Wikang Filipino, KWF).) One of the first promoters and developers of the Philippine national language, he was best known for his work Diksyunaryo–Tesauro Ingles–Pilipino.

Panganiban founded The Varsitarian, the student publication of the University of Santo Tomas, in 1928.

== Life ==
=== Early and personal life ===
Panganiban was born on June 12, 1903, in Bautista, Pangasinan, to Geminiano Z. Panganiban, a lawyer and pharmacist from Tanauan, Batangas, and Policarpia S. Villa of Caloocan, Rizal.

He spent his early childhood in Paniqui, Tarlac. By late 1915, his family returned to his father's hometown where, on April 5, 1930, he married Consuelo T. Torres; they had five children. By late 1950s, he resided in San Juan, Rizal.

Panganiban, while being fluent in Kapampangan aside from Tagalog and foreign languages, was also able to speak Ilocano and Pangasinan.

=== Education ===
Panganiban took primary education from 1909 in Panqui and Manila. He later finished primary and secondary studies in public schools in the towns of Tanauan (1919) and Batangas (1923), both in Batangas, respectively.

In college years, he took various courses, particularly liberal arts and medical, at the National University until 1925, where he earned an A.A. degree; and at the University of Santo Tomas (UST), graduating in 1935, where he earned as well bachelor's degrees in arts, philosophy and education. From 1936, he studied in Graduate Schools—at UST (Ph.Ltt.D.; 1936–37, 40–41) and at the University of Notre Dame in South Bend, Indiana, United States (M.A.; 1938–40).

==== Role in the establishment of The Varsitarian ====
While in UST, in 1927, Panganiban, then a journalism student and working as a hot cake cook in a university restaurant, were among those students who worked for an official student publication, which he established in January 1928 as Varsitarian—which would be the oldest Catholic campus paper in the Philippines; thus he is called the "father of Varsitarian". He had been the president of the UST Literary Society when he was elected associate editor of the publication at the start of academic year 1928–1929; he also became the business manager and editor of the Alumni and Humor sections.

Under Panganiban's leadership, the paper boosted literature and later received positive feedbacks due to its contents. He later suggested that the payment for the paper would be included in the tuition fee, citing financial issues and low circulation.

=== Career ===
==== Academic career ====
Panganiban began his teaching career in 1921, as a typewriting instructor at Batangas Business College. He also worked as English instructor at San Beda College in the 1930s, and as professorial lecturer at UE (University of the East).

In UST where he worked for years since 1928, he was an instructor for English, Tagalog, and Spanish languages; from 1940, he was also a professor of literature and journalism, at the same time being the director of the university's Akademya ng Wika (Academy of Filipino Languages). He acquired full professorship in 1941.

He also taught poetry, speech, justification, semantics, and lexicography.

In the late 1940s, he was the director of the Tanauan Institute. By the late 1960s, he worked as an interviewer in the graduate schools of UST, the Philippine Normal College, and Manuel L. Quezon University; at the same time, he was the first head of the Akademya ng Wikang Filipino, UNESCO–Pilipinas.

==== With the INL ====
Panganiban began to be involved at the Institute of National Language (INL) in 1944 when he passed a test for Assistant Chief of the Translating Division. He later had various positions, eventually the director for more than a decade since May 1955.

In a controversy involving the Institute where Tagalogs and non-Tagalogs had disputes on whether Tagalog be the national language, Panganiban was among the four directors being the proponents of that view. Tagalog was referred to as Pilipino by the Department of Education in 1959.

==== Wartime career ====
During World War II and months prior to the end of the Japanese occupation of the Philippines, Panganiban once acted as Liaison Officer in meeting the American army paratroopers in Tagaytay. In 1945, he then worked for PCAU (Philippine Civil Affairs Unit) 20, and as an evaluator at for the Military Censorship Department of the USAFFE (United States Army Forces in the Far East).

==== Others ====
Aside from his stint at the UST's Varsitarian, he worked as a reporter at Graphic Weekly. By late 1950s, he was a commentator particularly at DZBB and DZST, as well as a freelance writer and journalist.

Panganiban, also a lexicographer, authored several works in English, Tagalog, and Spanish languages starting in the late 1920s; and wrote poems and other literary pieces on various topics since 1919. Some of these, particularly related to Tagalog language, were serialized in newspapers and used in radio broadcasts; and in 1944, he wrote some pieces also for broadcasts. He also translated stage plays. He took time to study Tagalog with the help of his father.

He was a technical assistant of the Philippine delegation of the Golden Gate Exposition in San Francisco, California in 1939.

=== Research ===
==== As a linguist ====
According to Panganiban himself, since 1919, he began to help his father who had been conducting his research work as early as 1908; and continued that after the latter's death around 1935.

His father first published his sixteen conjugations of the Tagalog verb in Los Verbos Tagalos en 16 Conjugaciones in 1912, and further researches reduced the number to seven which was published as Fundamental Tagalog in 1937, a year prior to a proclamation issued by President Manuel L. Quezon designating Tagalog as the basis for the national language as suggested by the INL.

Thereafter, Panganiban taught Tagalog to a newly-arrived Dutch who was then appointed parish priest of San Jose, Nueva Ecija, within three months; the latter later suggested to merge two theories, thus reducing to six. He also consulted publications, Diccionario Tagalog-Hispano by Pedro Serrano-Laktaw and another by INL secretary and executive officer Cecilio Lopez.

Panganiban later used his 1937 publication, being used for Tagalog studies, to prove his theories, which was published by the INL in January 1939. At that time, he was about to publish Singhuluganan ng mga Salitáng Tagalog.

==== As a lexicographer ====
Compilation of data for Panganiban's proposed bilingual dictionary-thesaurus took at least three decades, with the help of his advisers, Dr. Eufronio Alip and Rev. Fr. Evergisto Bazaco, O.P., as well as informants throughout the country.

In 1941, a year since Pilipino became a compulsory subject in country's schools, Panganiban began working on proposed dictionaries through writing a manuscript, with suggestions from Alip and Bazaco. At the start of the Japanese invasion of the country, the manuscript was evacuated in Tanauan; being moved gradually until reaching Cabuyao, Laguna in 1945 following Japanese attacks in Tanauan and Lipa, at that time through guerilla captain Remigio Maniquis who brought with him the Royal typewriter being used in the project.

In March 1942, his stepmother Fidela, her wife Consuelo, and Leonila Torres, briefly acted as advisers and consultants. Aside from Alip, four other people did so in the next two years while Panganiban was in Manila, including then INL Director Lope K. Santos, whose interview with him gave way for the major revision of the manuscript in 1944, and Julián Cruz Balmaceda. The criticisms of Dr. Brigido Carandang, who would be later killed by the Japanese, contributed in the improvements.

The work on the manuscript became more intensive after the September 1944 American bombing of Manila, when his family evacuated with the manuscript in Tanauan where he had the chance to consult what he called the natural "Tagalists", particularly in five barrios.

Four more individuals took part of the plan at the end of the war, two of them became Panganiban's advisers as the work continued in Manila in March 1945. The manuscript was finished in June, went series of revisions, and was printed twice; the first, the English–Tagalog Vocabulary, was published in 1946.

The plan then continued, with two individuals evaluating the work in progress until part of it was published in Liwayway magazine as "Talahuluganang Tagalog-Ingles" from 1953 to 1964. Ten thousand words were contributed to INL. Such dictionary was published in 1966, with 13,000 copies eventually sold out by 1970.

The proposal ultimately came into reality in 1972 when the Diksyunaryo–Tesauro Pilipino–Ingles was finished. Both 1966 and 1972 publications effectively proved that about 30%–44% of the total of approximately 30,000 Filipino word roots being used were loanwords. (Note: In Panganiban's 1966 dictionary, he stated that among approximately 30,000 Filipino word roots, 5,000 are borrowed from Spanish origin, 3,200 from Malay, 1,500 each from Chinese and English, and hundreds are from other foreign origins, including Arabic, Japanese, and several Indo-European languages. Meanwhile, Panganiban's 1972 dictionary-thesaurus contains 27,069 main entries and 217,500 lexical entries; 12,000 of them are borrowed from Spanish, English, Chinese, and Indo-European languages. He listed 47,601 synonyms from 12 native languages of the Philippines, 12,659 homonyms, and 11,065 cognates.)

According to KWF, the contents of Panganiban's Pilipino dictionaries are highly distinct from Serrano-Laktaw's Diccionario and the American era dictionaries, citing the developments in 1938 and in 1959 involving Tagalog.

=== Works ===
Panganiban's scholarly publications made him one of the country's known Tagalog lexicographers. Among his contributions were:

- Fundamental Tagalog (Phil. Ed. Co.; 1938 or 1939)
- Ang Anim na Panahúnan ng mga Pagbadyáng Tagalog (The six conjugations of the Tagalog verb) (INL; January 1939)
- English–Tagalog Vocabulary (University Publishing Co., 1946); it is said to be an abridged form of the English–Tagalog Dictionary (1960) as well as of the English–Pilipino Thesaurus
  - English–Tagalog Thesaurus (mimeographed, 1967)
  - English–Tagalog Dictionary (1969)
- two Tagalog courses, published in 1948 and in 1965
- Talahuluganang Pilipino–Ingles (1966); it is said to be an abridged edition of Diksyunaryo–Tesauro Pilipino–Ingles (or Pilipino–Ingles Tesauro) (Manlapaz Publishing Co., 1972)

On the other hand, oral traditional literature, particularly folklore and epics, began to be apparent through Panitikan ng Pilipinas (Literature of the Filipinos), edited by the Panganiban couple, mimeographed in 1952 along with a separate English translation, and published in 1954. A thoroughly updated Filipino version was edited with Genoveva Matute and Corazon Kabigting, published in 1995 and became the most widely circulated literature textbook. In 1963, Panganiban published a survey on Philippine literature based on findings with his wife.

Some of his works were published serially in newspapers: in 1940, his Tagalog lessons in Taliba and The Commonwealth; and in 1953, his Talahuluganan and Tesaurong Tagalog in Liwayway and Varsitarian, respectively. In 1944, he likewise wrote stage plays, as well as dramas, language lessons, and an adaptation of Florante at Laura, for radio broadcasts.

He collaborated with Fr. Bazaco, O.P. in the latter's "Workbook in Spanish" in 1953.

=== Legacy ===
The annual lecture, the UST Varsitarian–JVP Professorial Chair for Journalism, was established in 1999.

== Love of Pilipino ==
In expressing his love for a national language, both orally and in writing, JVP became a controversial advocate of Pilipino as the "wikang pambansa". His detractors called him "Diktador ng Wika", "High Priest of National Language", “Emperador ng Wika”, “Czar ng Purismo” and “Frankenstein ng Purismo”. On the other hand, his allies called him “Bayani ng Wikang Pambansa”. JVP was neither a dictator nor a purist. He wrote in 1970:

“Multilingualism would be a solution to our linguistic problems. It would erase colonialism.. it would eliminate regionalism.. it would create nationalism. In the mutual contact of languages, foreign and local, the most useful form of national language will surface and will become the real PILIPINO.”

Unfortunately, it was not until months after his death that the 1973 Constitution established Pilipino as one of the two official languages of the Philippines – the other being English. In 1987, the Constitution stipulated that the National Assembly was to take steps toward the formation of a genuine national language to be called Filipino, which will incorporate elements from the various Philippine languages.
