= The LaSallian =

Official student publication of De La Salle University-Manila

- The bastion of issue-oriented critical thinking

- January 2025 issue of The LaSallian
- Type: Student newspaper
- Format: Broadsheet, online newspaper, social media
- School: De La Salle University
- Editor-in-chief: Gwen Cabinbin
- Associate editor: Elijah Salazar
- Managing editor: Virgil Noriega
- Founded: October 24, 1960; 66 years ago
- Language: English
- Headquarters: Br. Connon Hall, De La Salle University, Manila
- Website: www.thelasallian.com
- Free online archives: https://thelasallian.com/archives

The LaSallian (TLS) is the official student publication of De La Salle University (DLSU), founded in 1960. It is an English language newspaper, released every first week of every month from September to August, and is run entirely by undergraduate students of DLSU Manila.

== History ==
=== Founding ===
The La Sallian was first introduced as the official student publication of then-De La Salle College (DLSC) on October 24, 1960, under its first editor-in-chief (EIC), Polo Santiago Pantaleon. Its name was given by Ernido Agustin in a contest.

In December 1961, the publication released The Judean Journal, its first lampoon issue. In 1963, under EIC Ramon Henson, The La Sallian received "an A1 rating for makeup and photography" from the Columbian Press Association of Columbian University.

In 1967, EIC Jesus Manalastas opens Guest Writer, a column space for editors of student publications outside De La Salle College. During the decade, the publication prominently featured articles on student activism and academic freedom.

=== Under the Marcos regime ===
From 1972 to 1973, EIC Calixto Chikiamco, rumored to be the leader of the League of Filipino Students, introduced a Filipinization of the publication by tackling, among other topics, nationalism, radicalism, Communism, and Maoism. As De La Salle College became co-educational during this period, Irmina Nobleza and Josefina Sayoc became the first female writers of The La Sallian. DLSC becomes DLSU in 1975.

In 1976, Carmen Reyes became the first female editor-in-chief of TLS. During the Martial Law period in the Philippines, press freedom was heavily restricted by the Department of Education and Culture. As a result, student publications at DLSU were allowed to operate operated under the oversight of the University Board Review (UBR), which required prior approval for the printing and distribution of issues.

In December 1977, TLS inadvertently distributed an issue containing an editorial critical of Ferdinand Marcos and the 1977 Philippine presidential referendum without securing UBR approval. The incident led the UBR to accuse TLS of violating established procedure, which the publication countered as censorship. The controversy, along with other cited concerns—including a fire in the Student Affairs Center and the publication of an editorial titled "Press Freedom Is Dead"—led to the suspension of TLS operations. The publication resumed in February 1978 after reaching an agreement with the university administration.

In 1981, EIC Perry Lim Pe wrote the first TLS editorial in Filipino ("Mulat"). TLS was the first to oppose and report of the DLSU's adoption of a trimester calendar.

In 1983, frustrated by what it saw as Lasallian indifference, the publication released a special issue detailing the active participation of the University of the Philippines and Ateneo de Manila University in the opposition movement against President Ferdinand Marcos. TLS' October 1983 editorial, "Manila on the March," detailed the outpouring of anger against the Marcos regime in the aftermath of Ninoy Aquino's assassination.

=== TLS 26 to TLS 49 ===
In 1986, shortly after the People Power Revolution, TLS in its June–July issue reported of DLSU's acceptance into the University Athletic Association of the Philippines (UAAP)—six years after withdrawing from the National Collegiate Athletic Association due to the “Black August” brawl involving several DLSU and Colegio de San Juan de Letran men's basketball players.

In 1992, EIC Jonathan Mendoza changed the spelling of the publication's name to The LaSallian.

TLS, in response to the UAAP Board's decision to forfeit its championship win against the Far Eastern University Tamaraws men's basketball team, published its shortest editorial: “80-77. We played the game."

Under EIC Elegio Cabasug (1994–1995), the Features section was renamed Menagerie, with Ariz Convalecer as its editor. A series of deaths related to the DLSU's Reserve Officers' Training Corps hit campus, prompting an official investigation which led to the expulsion of more than 20 students. An inquiry by EIC Luis Laparan and news editor Edwin Tumbagan in 1995 led to the closure of several establishments serving alcoholic drinks and allowing the play of billiards. TLS had its first co-editors-in-chief, Luis Laparan and Angel Fortich, from 1996 to 1997.

Under EIC Faith Santiago (2000–2002), the Menagerie magazine was introduced, and the Spoofs (cartoons) section was renamed Poptown.

In a controversial move to renew the publication, the TLS editorial board led by Sarah Espina changed the nameplate font of the publication from Old English to Times New Roman in 2002.

The LaSallian was named Best Non-Weekly Newspaper by the United States’ Associated Collegiate Press. A TLS website was opened by succeeding EIC Isabelle Yujuico, but was later closed after being hacked.

In 2004, a disciplinary case involving EIC Meryll Yan opened the issue of bureaucracy in student services. A year later, she became the first editor to be awarded as Most Outstanding Student Leader in Gawad Mag-aaral's history. TLS became the first to give details of the new General Education Curriculum (which was eventually implemented in 2006–2007). Poptown is transferred from the Menagerie magazine to the broadsheet.

In 2005, EIC Paul Garilao and University Editor Donelle Gan exposed the exploits of a sexually harassing faculty member. TLS covered the university's lead role in the movement to oust President Gloria Macapagal-Arroyo from office, and reports of DLSU's suspension from the UAAP (for fielding ineligible Green Archers). The Multi-Sectoral Committee on Budget set the lowest ever tuition fee increase at 3.828 percent. TLS releases a tribute in honor of Br. Andrew Gonzalez, who died in February 2006.

In 2006, under EIC Donelle Gan, The LaSallian detailed the formation of De La Salle Philippines, the newly formed overseeing body of all Lasallian schools in the country. Paulo Mutuc and Ross Delantar, through the 2005 The LaSallian anniversary special article Corporate Academics, bagged The LaSallian's first Lasallian Scholarum Award for Outstanding Feature Story on Youth and Education in a School Organ. The LaSallian's website is re-launched.

Cover page of The LaSallian's October 2008 issue.

In February 2008, the publication briefly adopted a news magazine layout, drawing controversy with its readers. In his editor's note, EIC Paulo Mutuc, noted that the change was made to "come up with is a more harmonious marriage between form and function, between what you want to read and what we think you ought to read." After the school year, the majority of staffers voted in favor of the magazine layout, but in order for the by-laws (which states that The LaSallian is a newspaper) to be ratified, two-thirds of the staff should vote for the affirmative. As a result, regular issues continued to be released in the broadsheet format while some special issues may be released in the magazine format.

In partnership with The GUIDON, the official student publication of the Ateneo de Manila University, TLS launched “PressPlay,” a journalism contest and seminar open to college student journalists.

=== TLS 50 to TLS 59 ===
In 2010, TLS celebrated its golden jubilee under EIC Angel Bombarda. DLSU President Br. Armin Luistro accepts the secretary of education post and The LaSallian was first to report about the changes in DLSU leadership. In addition, The LaSallian broke the news of the construction of the Henry Sy Sr. Hall under the Centennial Renewal Plan. Photo Editor Adi Bontuyan put up The LaSallian's Facebook page and a full-time web team handled The LaSallian website.

In 2011, DLSU celebrated 100 years of Lasallian presence in the Philippines and The LaSallian released a centennial issue in commemoration under EIC Jessy Go. The LaSallian launched its Twitter account on June 16, mainly to provide live coverage of President Noynoy Aquino's visit to DLSU during the centennial celebration. Art & Graphics Editor Jerome de Dios led the redesign and standardization of the broadsheet layout and the masthead font changes from Times New Roman to Arno Pro. Menagerie is discontinued as a magazine and is released as a separate broadsheet instead.

In 2012, under EIC Patrick Ong, The LaSallian won the Top Division Award of the 1st Philippine Student Quill Awards, as well as the Award of Excellence for its social media presence. The editorial board created The LaSallian's Instagram account.

During that year, both The LaSallian and The GUIDON published separate editorials response to an editorial of The Varsitarian on the Responsible Parenthood and Reproductive Health Act of 2012, which had tagged professors of De La Salle University and Ateneo de Manila University in support of the bill as "intellectual pretenders and interlopers" and criticized both universities for allowing such views. TLS affirmed that the publication did not release an official stand on the bill to respect "every person's right to have his or her own informed opinion" and to encourage staffers to think critically while respecting other people's right to different opinions. It cited Pope John Paul II's encylical letter Ex corde Ecclesiae, which challenges Catholic universities to follow Catholic teachings, but never to impose on the freedom of conscience of others. The publication also criticized the editorial for its "method of expression", which it argues "should stick to the issues, and backing conclusions with substantial, objective arguments".

In 2014, The LaSallian was named the third Best Four-year Non-weekly Newspaper by the United States-based Associated Collegiate Press at the 2014 Best of the Midwest Best of Show awards. A feature story award was also given to Menagerie Editor Ysmael Suarez at the Individual Awards.

In 2015, EIC Ronaldo Manzano spearheaded TLS’ coverage of Pope Francis’ visit to the Philippines. All TLS social media accounts grew exponentially, with the Facebook page first breaking 100,000, then 150,000 likes. The Layout section is separated from the Arts & Graphics section while the Web section is formalized, with Marinel Mamac and Angelika Tirona serving as the first Layout and Web editors, respectively. Under succeeding EIC Marinel Mamac, TLS delivered live updates and extended coverage of both President Noynoy Aquino's last state of the nation address, and the 2016 Philippine national elections. TLS bagged several prizes in the Philippine Student Quill Awards.

In 2017, TLS 57 provided live coverage of The Lasallian initiatives and protests against President Ferdinand Marcos's burial in the Libingan ng mga Bayani.

The editorial board successfully launched PressPlay 2017 in partnership with The GUIDON after previous efforts to discontinue the event.

=== TLS 60 to present ===
In 2023, a full copy of The LaSallian's maiden issue was retrieved from its first EIC, Polo Pantaleon, by the TLS 63 editorial board, led by TLS 63 EIC Kim Balasabas. The retrieval and eventual digital archiving of the issue were spearheaded by TLS 63 Circulations Manager Christopher Go.

In 2025, The LaSallian published a satirical April Fools’ Day spoof titled "I’m a LaSallian, of course…", which drew attention of social media. A meme from the spoof showing students hesitating to cross the road with a campus security guard circulated widely online and prompted online discussion on road safety and fatalities along Taft Avenue.

In 2024, TLS 64 Layout Editor Gabe Mempin led a visual rebranding, replacing the publication's long-standing Myriad Pro typeface with Hex Franklin.

On June 30, 2025, The LaSallian and The GUIDON ended their annual PressPlay partnership, as announced through a notice on Facebook and subsequently shared by both publications on their respective social media accounts.

In September 2025, The LaSallian's social media presence included 254,000 followers on Facebook, 20,500 followers on Instagram, 214,100 followers on Twitter, and 3,500 subscribers on Telegram.

== Sections ==
The LaSallian is composed of four writing sections, a multimedia section, and four technical sections:

- University - The news section of the publication. It reports and analyzes both university and national issues.
- Menagerie - The features section of the publication. It delves into culture inside and outside the university with an emphasis on both less-reported and human-centric topics.
- Sports - The sports section of the publication. It reports on all aspects of the university's sports activities.
- Vanguard - The science writing section of the publication, It focuses on featuring new advancements in science and technology and providing commentary on the complex and ethical issues of the field.
- Intermedia - The multimedia section of the publication. Established in 2021, it aims to expand the publication through the telling of life stories using different forms of media.
- Art & Graphics - Produces article visuals, event highlights, comics, and editorial cartoons for the publication.
- Layout - Responsible for the organization and layouting of the broadsheet in the publication's monthly issues.
- Photo - Provides photo visuals for articles and news, events, and sports coverage for the publication.
- Web - Manages the publication's digital content strategy on their social media channels and website.

== Spoof ==
On April Fools' Day every year, The LaSallian releases a lineup of articles called Spoof that offers satirical commentary on social issues.

The Spoof lineup, however, has been subject to some controversy, such as in 2023, when a satirical article depicted a fictitious "mandatory ROTC program" as a commentary on the issue of reimposing mandatory Reserve Officers' Training Corps (ROTC) in schools. The article was eventually taken down and a statement was issued by The LaSallian the next day.

== PressPlay ==
During SY 2007–2008, The LaSallian and Ateneo de Manila University's official newspaper, The GUIDON, started an annual student press convention called PressPlay in cooperation with the National Union of Journalists of the Philippines (NUJP). It features seminars in writing, editing, photography, and art. Contests are also held for the participants, composed of other student publications. The seminar is held annually on January, and is done alternately in the Ateneo and La Salle campuses.

PressPlay 2021 was a two-day online event hosted by The LaSallian, themed "The Fourth Estate–Reimagine: A Journalism Convention," focused on promoting journalism that combats misinformation and educates the public on social issues. In 2022, the event became a three-day online workshop and competition hosted by The GUIDON, under the theme "Pillar of Truth: Media of Democracy," featuring the Broadsheet Competition for Senior High School Publications and the Pitching Competition for Tertiary Publications.

PressPlay 2023 marked the first post-pandemic event, held in a two-day hybrid setup with Day 1 virtually on Zoom and Day 2 in person at DLSU - Manila. Hosted by The LaSallian, the theme "Fortifying the Frontlines" emphasized journalism's role in confronting challenges faced by those defending truth. In 2024, The GUIDON hosted PressPlay 2024 at ADMU, a two-day conference for collegiate publications, themed "Upholding Truth in the Age of Artificial Intelligence," focusing on maintaining journalistic integrity in a world where technology distorts truth.

In 2025, The LaSallian hosted PressPlay as a one-day journalism conference and competition at DLSU - Manila, themed "PressPlay 2025: Rebuilding the Truth of Our Nation." The event aimed to empower campus journalists ahead of the 2025 Midterm Elections, focusing on combating narrative distortion, raising national awareness, and promoting fearless journalism. Notable speakers included Atom Araullo, Job Manahan, Bea Cupin, Michael Ubac, Iam StephB, and Juniesy Estanislao. Prior to the event, The LaSallian and The GUIDON released a joint editorial, "The spirit of EDSA in 1986 versus in 2025," reflecting on the EDSA People Power Revolution while highlighting the erosion of truth and increasing division among Filipinos.

In June 2025, The GUIDON and The LaSallian released a joint statement announcing that PressPlay would be placed on indefinite hiatus. The publications attributed the decision to "changing organizational systems" and emphasized that the two publications would remain committed to promoting campus journalism independently.

== TLS editors ==
- Polo Santiago Pantaleon - 1960-1961
- Ramon Henson - 1963
- Jesus Manalastas - 1967
- Calixto Chikiamco - 1972-1973
- Menie Odulio - 1977-1978
- Perry Lim Pe - 1981
- Alicia Alegria - 1987 (?)
- Bombit Largoza - 1991-1992
- Jonathan Mendoza - 1992
- Elegio Cabasug - 1994-1995
- Luis Laparan, Angel Fortich - 1996-1997
- Noelle Leslie de la Cruz - 1998
- Faith Santiago - 2000-2002
- Sarah Espiña - 2002-2003
- Isabelle Yujuico - 2003-2004
- Meryll Yan - 2004-2005
- Paul Garilao - 2005-2006
- Donelle Gan - 2006-2007
- Paulo Mutuc - 2007-2008
- Angel Bombarda - 2010-2011
- Patrick Ong - 2012-2013
- Ronaldo Manzano - 2014-2015
- Marinel Mamac - 2015-2016
- Wilhelm Tan - 2016-2017
- Cara Patalinghog - 2018-2019
- Jan Emmanuel Alonzo - 2020-2021
- Sabrina Joyce Go - 2021
- Ramon Castañeda - 2021-2022
- Ana Mapa - 2022-2023
- Kim Balasabas - 2023-2024
- Amanda Palmera - 2024-2025
- Clark Siao - 2025-2026
- Angel Migue - 2026
- Gwen Cabinbin - 2026-present

The list is incomplete*

== Notable alumni ==
- William Tiu Chua, Martial Law Activist and Human Rights Lawyer, former Editor
- Bernard S. Oca, current DLSU president, former Features staffer
- Calixto Chikiamco, former editor-in-chief and managing editor
- Carlo Vergara, comic creator of Zsazsa Zaturnnah, former A&G staffer
- Cathy Yang, former Features editor
- Jose Javier Reyes, director, FDCP president, former Features writer
- Julio C. Teehankee, former Features editor
- Philip Juico, former Sports editor and associate editor
