= Rina Jimenez-David =

Filipino journalist and columnist (1955–2023)

- Born: January 11, 1955; Philippines
- Died: November 12, 2023 (aged 68); Philippines
- Education: University of Santo Tomas
- Occupation: Journalist
- Writing career
- Language: English
- Notable work: Women at Large
- Notable awards: Best columnist 2004 "TOWNS" 2013

Rina Jimenez-David (January 11, 1955 – November 12, 2023) was a Filipino journalist and columnist for the Philippine Daily Inquirer.

== Career ==
In her collegiate years, Jimenez-David served as the editor-in-chief of the University of Santo Tomas' student publication, The Varsitarian, from 1975 to 1976.

An advocate for women's health issues, Jimenez-David lived in Alaminos, Pangasinan, graduated from the University of Santo Tomas in 1976, and joined the broadsheet newspaper Philippine Daily Inquirer in 1988. She studied journalism at the Johns Hopkins University School of Public Health in Baltimore.

Jimenez-David was awarded Best Columnist for Excellence in Population Reporting at the Global Media Awards in 2004 and the TOWNS award in 2013. She was a judge in a contest to select outstanding teachers. She met with Philippine president Noynoy Aquino and other journalists and politicians in 2012. She was the managing editor of a publication about her Jimenez family genealogy entitled In Search of Family published in 2001. Her book Women at Large was a finalist in the Philippine National Book Awards in 1994.

== Death ==
Jimenez-David died on November 12, 2023, at the age of 68.
