= Temario Rivera =

Filipino educator (1946/1947–2024)

Temario C. Rivera
- A photograph of Rivera.
- Born: 1946 or 1947; Philippines
- Died: September 18, 2024 (aged 77); Philippines
- Occupations: Educator, Political Scientist

Academic background
- Education: University of the Philippines Diliman (AB, MA); University of Wisconsin-Madison (PhD)
- Thesis: Class, the State, and Foreign Capital: The Politics of Philippine Industrialization, 1950-1986 (1994)
- Doctoral advisor: Alfred W. McCoy

Academic work
- Discipline: Political Science
- Institutions: University of the Philippines Diliman

Temario "Temy" C. Rivera (1946 or 1947 – September 18, 2024) was a Filipino political scientist.

== Background ==
Rivera was educated at the University of the Philippines Diliman where he graduated with a bachelor's degree in political science in 1966, and a master's in the same subject in 1982. He was also editor-in-chief of The Philippine Collegian in 1967. He received his doctorate in development studies at the University of Wisconsin–Madison (Ph.D.) In 1994, he authored the prize-winning book, Landlords and Capitalists: Class, Family and State in Philippine Manufacturing (published by the University of the Philippines Press).

Rivera was professor of political science at the University of the Philippines Diliman, where he served as Chair of the Department of Political Science from 1993 to 1998. He also chaired the Center for People Empowerment in Governance from 2013 until his death from pancreatic cancer on September 18, 2024, at the age of 77. He had been diagnosed with the disease the previous month.

== Landlords and capitalists ==
Patently Marxist and combining Philippine elite historiography, his analysis in Landlords and Capitalists implicitly accepted the theoretical line of semi-feudal and semi-colonial of the Philippine revolutionary left, demonstrating that the social structure and economic topography of the Philippines is exhibiting hybrid features of capitalism and feudalism. The hybridity of this socio-economic architecture in a context of a weak state formation often captive by robust traditional social forces (clans, families) has caused and sustained the inequitable distribution of economic and political power in the Philippine society (described by Walden Bello as an "immobile class structure that is one of the worst in Asia") and the harnessing of democratic efforts towards patently conservative objectives such as obstructionist policies on land reform, inadequate social service, and anti-labor inclination among others. Rivera also faulted this unique feature for the continuing developmental morass that afflicts the Philippines, despite the fact that most of its neighbors in the Southeast Asian region have significantly achieved substantive development as newly industrialized economies.

Temario later lived in Japan, where he was a professor of comparative politics at the International Christian University in Tokyo. He also served as the editor in chief of the Philippine Political Science Journal since 1993.
