= The Guidon =

Official student publication of Ateneo de Manila University

The GUIDON

- March 2023 cover of the publication
- Type: Student publication
- Format: Broadsheet
- Owner: Ateneo de Manila University
- Founder(s): Rev. Frank O’Hara, SJ
- Editor-in-chief: Caitlin Gayle G. Bernal
- Associate editor: Ysabel Patrice A. Mercado
- Managing editor: Frederique Anne R. Napiza
- Design executive editor: Aliya Isabel Owena D. Delos Santos
- Founded: June 22, 1929; 97 years ago
- Language: English
- Headquarters: Publications Room (MVP 201-202), Ateneo de Manila University, Loyola Heights, Quezon City, Philippines
- OCLC number: 220814332
- Website: theguidon.com

The Guidon (stylized as The GUIDON) is the official student newspaper of Ateneo de Manila University. Published monthly between August and March, The GUIDON is a member of the Ateneo's Confederation of Publications and is one of the founding members of the College Editors Guild of the Philippines, along with The Varsitarian of the University of Santo Tomas, The Philippine Collegian of the University of the Philippines Diliman, and The National of National University (Philippines). As of 2026, The GUIDON is in its 97th year, with its editor-in-chief being Caitlin Gayle G. Bernal, its associate editor being Ysabel Patrice A. Mercado, its managing editor being Frederique Anne R. Napiza, and its design executive editor being Aliya Isabel Owena D. Delos Santos.

== History ==
After several years of Ateneo de Manila students asking for a school newspaper, The Guidon was founded on June 22 by 1929 by Rev. Frank O'Hara, SJ, with Manuel C. Colayco as its first editor-in-chief. During the 1930s, the paper immersed itself in national issues with a Catholic slant, which included its protestation at the time of a proposed divorce bill. It ceased publication at the onset of World War II, eventually resuming operations in 1946 under the editorship of Maximo Soliven.

In the 1950s the paper began international distribution and expanded its focus to include major global issues and more social issues. During this time it received numerous awards, with the Columbia Scholastic Press Association and the Associated Collegiate Press consistently recognized its excellence.

In the 1960s, The Guidon began discussing the possibility of co-education at the university and sought to lessen its domination by elite Filipinos.

In the 1970s, the paper involved itself in national issues, with issues 38 and 39 being published as Ang Pandayan (English: The Foundry). During this time, the paper's Editorial Board became increasing politically divided, leading to the publication of two versions of The Guidon. Both versions of the paper were temporarily shut down by the martial law declaration of Ferdinand Marcos, eventually resuming publication as a single newspaper in 1973. The same year women were admitted to the University for the first time, with Chao Chuatico becoming the paper's first female editor-in-chief. After the assassination of Benigno Aquino Jr. in 1983, the paper increased its coverage of national issues.

In the 1990s The Guidon editorial team began using modern computer technology to create its newspapers and began splitting them into two sections. During this time the paper renamed its Research Department to the "Inquiry Team" and created an outreach program called Pamaskong Handog. The newspaper also expanded to include the Operations, Human Resources, and Marketing positions and increased its involvement in University legislation, proposing amendments to the Campus Journalism Act of 1991.

In 2003 the newspaper renamed its Operations position to Externals and created the Human Resources Training and Development Team. In 2007, The Guidon launched Beyond Loyola, a new section of the newspaper that would discuss Filipino social, political, and economic issues. In 2008 the newspaper launched an online lifestyle magazine called g, relaunching it as Katipunan Magazine in 2012, and as Vantage Magazine in 2014. In 2017, The Guidon launched its Broadcast News staff and recreated its Research position to help research topics that include quantitative analysis. In 2023, the Research staff officially rebranded into Research and Development, signaling its deeper involvement in assessing internal operations.

== Organization ==
The Guidon's 31-member editorial board team is divided into three departments: the Writing Cluster (abbreviated as W8), the Design Cluster (abbreviated as D4), and the Organizational Cluster (abbreviated as O4).

The Writing Cluster, headed by the associate editor, produces content for the newspaper, with separate staff members for the News, Sports, Beyond Loyola, Features, and Inquiry sections of the newspaper, the cluster also has its online presence in the form of the Broadcast News, Vantage Magazine, and Science and Technology, which was created as a new section for the publication's 95th year.

The Design Cluster, headed by the design executive editor, creates multimedia content for the newspaper, with separate staff members for Photos, Graphic Design, Video Production, and Digital Development.

The Organizational Cluster, headed by the managing editor, manages various organizational tasks for the newspaper, with separate staff members for Human Resources, Publication Relations (formerly known as Externals), Social Media, and Research and Development.

== Content and activities ==
The Guidon has four sections: the Main Section (which includes News, Opinion, and Sports), the Beyond Loyola section, the Features section, and the Inquiry section. The Beyond Loyola section discusses national and international issues, while the Inquiry section discusses explanatory and investigative journalism. Aside from its newspaper, The Guidon also publishes broadcast news and has an online magazine called Vantage Magazine. The Guidon's special publications include Blue Ballot and the Graduation Magazine. Blue Ballot reports on elections, including national elections, Ateneo freshmen elections, and Ateneo's general elections. The Graduation Magazine is a publication for seniors graduating from the Ateneo de Manila University, featuring special events and significant teachers and students, among other topics.

The Guidon also participates in several events, including the ACED-The Guidon Workshop and PressPlay. ACED-The Guidon Workshop is a collaboration with the Ateneo Center for Educational Development that instructs Filipino public school students interested in journalism on basic news writing, editing, photography, and lay-outing. Pressplay is an annual student press convention between The GUIDON and The LaSallian, De La Salle University's official newspaper, featuring seminars in writing, editing, photography, and art. The event also includes contests for individual student publications.

== Notable alumni ==
- Benigno Aquino III, former President of the Philippines
- Ninoy Aquino, former Senator of the Philippines
- Lamberto V. Avellana, film and stage director
- Art Borjal, congressman and columnist
- Walden Bello, writer and activist
- Jeff Canoy, journalist
- Antonio Carpio, Supreme Court Associate Justice
- Jose Mari Chan, singer
- Manuel Colayco, journalist and war hero
- Horacio de la Costa, Jesuit priest and historian
- Pia Hontiveros, journalist
- Eman Lacaba, poet, writer, and revolutionary socialist
- Pete Lacaba, writer and journalist
- Raul Manglapus, former Secretary of Foreign Affairs
- Maximo Soliven, journalist and newspaper publisher

== See also ==
- List of student newspapers in the Philippines
