= Paz Latorena =

Filipina writer

- Born: Paz Latorena; January 17, 1908; Boac, Marinduque, Philippine Islands
- Died: October 20, 1953 (aged 45); Tawi-Tawi
- Education: University of the Philippines Manila
- Occupation: Writer

Paz M. Latorena (pseudonym, Mina Lys; January 17, 1908 – October 19, 1953) was one of the notable writers of the first generation of Filipino English writers, in both literary writing and education. She was a poet, editor, author, and teacher.

== Biography ==
Paz Manguera Latorena was born on Jan. 17, 1908 in Boac, Marinduque. She was the oldest among the ten children of Magda Manguera and Ricardo Latorena

She finished basic schooling at St. Scholastica’s College in Manila and the Manila South High School (as the Araullo High School). In 1926, she took up Education at the University of the Philippines (UP) in Manila where she also attended a short story writing class under Paz Márquez-Benítez.

In 1927, Latorena received an invitation from Benitez to write a column for the Philippines Herald Magazine, of which Benitez was the literary editor. That same year, Latorena, along with other campus writers, founded the UP Writers’ Club. The Literary Apprentice, the UP Writers’ Club’s publication, then ran a short story by Latorena titled “A Christmas Tale.”

Latorena also wrote poetry under the pseudonym, Mina Lys, which, according to Tanlayco, had a “romantic significance,” for the then young writer.

Before the year ended, she won the third prize in Jose Garcia Villa’s Roll of Honor for the Best Stories of 1927 for her story, “The Small Key.”

For her final year of college, in 1927, Latorena transferred to UST to finish her Education degree. She became the literary editor of the Varsitarian and published her poems, “Insight” and “My Last Song,” under her nom de plume, Mina Lys.

She shortly earned her master’s and doctorate degree while teaching literature courses in UST. In 1934, her doctoral dissertation, “Philippine Literature in English: Old Voices and New,” received the highest rating of sobresaliente.

Latorena’s former students include F. Sionil Jose, Nita Umali, Genoveva Edroza Matute, Zeneida Amador, Ophelia Dimalanta and Alice Colet-Villadolid, to name a few.
