= Philippine Collegian =

Student newspaper of the University of the Philippines Diliman

- Cover page on August 21, 2017
- Type: Student publication
- Format: Tabloid
- School: University of the Philippines Diliman
- Editor-in-chief: AJ Dela Cruz: (for past editors, see section)
- Founded: 1922; 104 years ago: 1910 (as the College Folio); 1917 (as Varsity News)
- Political alignment: Left-wing
- Language: English, Filipino
- Headquarters: Student Union Building, University of the Philippines Diliman, Quezon City, Philippines
- OCLC number: 222576528
- Website: phkule.org

The Philippine Collegian, also known as Kulê (Tagalog: [kʊˈleʔ]), is an alternative news outlet and the official student publication of the University of the Philippines Diliman. Established in 1922, the Collegian is commonly associated with the national democratic movement, with many of the publication's staffers opposing martial law under Ferdinand Marcos.

The Collegian continues to publish views critical of the university administration and the Philippine government as a "mainstay of the Philippine democratic left."

== History ==
=== Early history (1910-1961) ===
The Collegian, first established in the University of the Philippines as the College Folio in 1910 and then Varsity News in 1917, was one of the first undergraduate journals in the Philippines. The Philippine Collegian was officially established in 1922.

In 1935, the Collegian published historian Teodoro Agoncillo's review of Ricardo Pascual's Dr. Jose Rizal: Beyond the Grave despite strong opposition from the Catholic Church. In 1951, editor-in-chief Elmer Ordoñez criticized the resignation of University of the Philippines President Bienvenido Gonzalez as an "ouster" due to political pressure under President Elpidio Quirino.

During the Japanese occupation of the Philippines, the Collegian was largely silent, since many of the university's units were shut down. It resumed publication in 1946.

Despite the Red Scare, the Collegian continued publishing articles tackling socialism and armed struggle under the Hukbong Mapagpalaya ng Bayan.

The 1950s brought to the fore issues of academic freedom in the university, heightening the clash of beliefs between the Collegian, the university administration, and the national government. Then-editor Homobono Adaza was expelled for an editorial criticizing the UP administration.

=== Nationalism and dictatorship (1961-1986) ===
The Collegian at the turn of the 60s included such figures as revolutionary and Communist Party of the Philippines founder Jose Maria Sison, journalist and academic Luis Teodoro, and writer Petronilo Daroy. Sison had previously written a requiem published in the Collegian for assassinated Congolese Prime Minister Patrice Lumumba under a pseudonym, and together with the re-publication of Benedict Kerkvliet's Peasant War in the Philippines, led to a hearing by the House of Representatives' Committee on Anti-Filipino Activities protested by over 3,000 students and faculty.

The Collegian took vocal stands on national issues under the presidential terms of Diosdado Macapagal and Ferdinand Marcos. In 1966, former Collegian editor Voltaire Garcia, along with contributor Francisco Nemenzo and University Student Council chairperson Benjamin Muego, began organizing 'teach-ins' discussing topics such as academic freedom, Maoist China, and the Vietnam War. The Collegian also supported the Diliman Commune in 1971, labeling it "[the] united effort of all suffering classes [to] broaden and deepen the impact of the Cultural Revolution."

During Martial Law, the Collegian defied the media blackout by going underground. The publication formed the radical press together with the other student publications such as the Ang Malaya of the Philippine College of Commerce, now Polytechnic University of the Philippines and Pandayan of Ateneo de Manila University and the publications of various national democratic groups.

By the time Martial Law was declared in 1972, the Collegian's nationalist orientation was already established. The publication continued to operate underground, exposing realities that were vastly different from what was presented by government-controlled media. Subsequently, several Collegian staff, including Enrique Voltaire Garcia, Antonio Tagamolila, and Jacinto Peña faced imprisonment and death.

While the regular Collegian headed by Oscar Yabes in 1973 headlined UP President Salvador P. Lopez's campus beautification project and weekly UAAP updates, the Rebel Collegian decried the 20-percent tuition hike and the dissolution of student institutions like the Office of Student Regent and the UP Student Council. The Rebel Collegian issues brought to the fore the students' demand for lower tuition and dorm rates, among others, while "taking up the oppressed masses cause in exposing the corruption, servility, and violence of our semi-colonial and semi-feudal society". The Rebel Collegian accused Yabes of privileging the publication of literary works over material critical of the dictatorship. Yabes would also later come under fire due to his alleged malversation of the newspaper's funds.

=== After People Power (1986-2000) ===
The paper remained vigilant even after the collapse of the Marcos regime. In the 1989 editorial "EDSA and UP—Three Years After", editor Ruben Carranza noted that "social injustice and foreign domination" remained entrenched in Philippine society. In the euphoria following the end of People Power, this viewpoint was decidedly unpopular.

The conflicts experienced by the Collegian, however, were not entirely external. Power struggles and challenges in editorship roused many controversies in the past. The Rebel Collegian came into existence in 1996 after the battle between Voltaire Veneracion and Richard Gappi, rivals for the editorship that year. The UP community saw two contending Collegians—Gappi's Rebel Collegian and the regular Collegian under Veneracion. The articles in the Rebel Collegian in 1996 bore no byline, although it was an open secret that Gappi led the publication's operations. The newsprint became an arena of the opposing camps from the ideological rift that characterized the Left movement then. On the one hand, Veneracion and the editor before him, Ibarra Gutierrez, espoused social democratic politics, Gappi and most of his colleagues from former EIC Michael John Ac-Ac's staff embraced national democracy. The 1980s and 1990s spurred additional internal disputes as staffers and editors fought to assert competing philosophies.

=== Early 2000s ===
The Collegian was hosted on kule.upd.edu.ph in the early 2000s. It later migrated to philippinecollegian.net and then philippinecollegian.org. Online copies of the publication's print issues were posted on DeviantArt until 2013, later migrating to Issuu.

At the height of the campaign against the 300 percent tuition hike, then UP President Emerlinda Roman insisted on a public bidding for the Collegian's printing press, based on the university administration's interpretation of Republic Act 9184 or the Government Procurement Act. The Collegian's funds were withheld for four months.

=== Present ===
In 2018, the Rebel Collegian was established for the fourth time. Controversy arose when the Board of Judges for the Collegian's editorial examinations, headed by UP College of Mass Communication Dean Elena Pernia, released the list of qualified takers but excluded two Collegian writers, Marvin Ang and Richard Cornelio, on the grounds of their graduating statuses. Law student Jayson Edward San Juan topped the four-part test and the decision was upheld despite appeals from the Collegian and student councils in UP to hold another examination. Sheila Ann Abarra, the managing editor of the past editorial term, served as Rebel Kulê's EIC.

The Collegian transitioned into online publishing during the COVID-19 lockdowns. The exclusively online arrangement made way for long, broad-gauged writing—in June 2020, the Collegian published a 48-page special online issue on the first three months of the lockdown. Now, the publication continues to publish content and news updates on its Facebook, Instagram, and X, the platform formerly known as Twitter, pages, as well as its official website, phkule.org.

After a two-year hiatus, the Collegian returned to physical publishing in May 2022, just before the 2022 Philippine presidential election. The publication reverted to a tabloid format in 2023.

Since the ouster of Marcos during the EDSA Revolution, the Collegian has regularly undergone changes in format and withstood controversies regarding the selection of its editors.

== Collegian editors ==
- Jose Delgado, 1922
- Paulino Ybañez, 1922–1923
- Francisco Capistrano, 1923–1924
- Celedonio P. Gloria, 1926–1927
- Fortunato de Leon, 1928–1929
- Emerito M. Ramos, 1930–1931
- Wenceslao Q. Vinzons, 1931–1932
- Ambrosio Padilla, 1932–1933
- Arturo M. Tolentino, 1933–1934
- Armando de J. Malay, 1934–1935
- Fred Ruiz Castro, 1935–1936
- Sinai C. Hamada, 1936–1937
- Romeno S. Busuego, 1937–1938
- Renato Constantino, 1939–1940
- Angel G. Baking, 1940–1941
- Delfin R. Garcia, 1941–1942
- Juan M. Hagad, 1946–1947
- Mariano V. Ampil, Jr., 1947–1948
- Leonardo B. Perez, 1948–1949
- Augusto Caesar Espiritu, 1949–1950
- Elmer A. Ordonez, 1950–1951
- Francisco D. Villanueva, 1951–1952
- Ignacio Debuque, Jr., 1952–1953
- Crispulo J. Icban, Jr., 1953–1954
- Luis Q. U. Uranza, Jr., 1954–1955
- Sabino Padilla, Jr., 1955–1956
- Homobono A. Adaza, 1956
- Jose H. Y. Masakayan, 1956–1957
- Homobono A. Adaza, 1957–1958
- Pacifico Agabin, 1958
- Caesar Agnir, 1958–1959
- Andres G. Gatmaitan, 1959–1960
- Leonardo Quisumbing, 1961–1962
- Angelito Imperio, 1962–1963
- Tristan Catindig, 1964
- Salvador T. Carlota, 1964
- Enrique Voltaire Garcia II, 1965
- Ancheta K. Tan, 1965
- Agustin Que, 1966
- Jaime J. Yambao, 1966
- Temario Rivera, 1967
- Nelson A. Navarro, 1967
- Miriam P. Defensor, 1968
- José Y. Arcellana, 1968
- Victor H. Manarang, 1969
- Ernesto M. Valencia, 1970
- Antonio S. Tagamolila, 1970
- Reynaldo B. Vea, 1971
- Eduardo T. Gonzalez, 1971
- Teodoro D. Yabut, Jr., 1972
- Oscar G. Yabes, 1972–1973
- Emmanuel F. Esguerra, 1974–1975
- Diwa C. Guinigundo, 1975
- Abraham Sarmiento, Jr., 1975–1976
- Cosme Diaz Rosell, 1976–1977
- Alexander Poblador, 1977–1978
- Diwata A. Reyes, 1978–1979
- Malou Mangahas, 1979–1980
- Roberto Z. Coloma, 1980–1981
- Roan I. Libarios, 1981–1982
- Napoleon J. Poblador, 1982–1983
- Raphael P. M. Lotilla, 1983–1984
- Benjamin Pimentel, Jr., 1984–1985
- Noel Pangilinan, 1985–1986
- Dean Karlo La Vina, 1986–1987
- Ma. Cristina Godinez, 1987–1988
- Patrocinio Jude H. Esguerra III, 1988–1989
- Ruben Carranza, Jr., 1989–1990
- Francis Ronald Perez, 1990–1991
- Alexander Pabico, 1991–1992
- Pablo John Garcia, Jr., 1992–1993
- Bernard Cobarrubias, 1993–1994
- Michael John C. Ac-ac, 1994–1995
- Ibarra M. Gutierrez, 1995–1996
- Voltaire Veneracion, 1996–1997
- Lourdes C. Gordolan, 1997–1998
- Jeanie Rose Bacong, 1998–1999
- Seymour Barros-Sanchez, 1999–2000
- Herbert V. Docena, 2000–2001
- Duke M. Bajenting, 2001–2002
- Ellaine Rose A. Beronio, 2002–2003
- Sherwin A. Mapanoo, 2003–2004
- Jayson DP. Fajarda, 2004–2005
- Juan Paolo E. Colet, 2005–2006
- Karl Fredrick M. Castro, 2006–2007
- Jerrie M. Abella, 2007–2008
- Larissa Mae R. Suarez, 2008–2009
- Om Narayan A. Velasco, 2009–2010
- Pauline Gidget R. Estella, 2010–2011
- Marjohara S. Tucay, 2011–2012
- Ma. Katherine H. Elona, 2012–2013
- Julian Inah G. Anunciacion, 2013–2014
- Mary Joy T. Capistrano, 2014–2016
- Karen Ann A. Macalalad, 2016–2017
- Sanny Boy D. Afable, 2017–2018
- Jayson Edward B. San Juan, 2018–2019
- Beatrice P. Puente, 2019–2020
- Kimberly Anne P. Yutuc, 2020–2021
- Polynne E. Dira, 2021–2022
- Daniel Sebastianne B. Daiz, 2022–2023
- Rona Q. Pizarro, 2023–2024
- Ryan Jericho F. Maltezo, 2024–2025
- John Regulus M. Dipasupil, 2025–2026
- Allen John A. Dela Cruz, 2026–present

== Notable alumni ==
- Angela Manalang-Gloria, pioneering Filipina poet who wrote in English
- Ambrosio Padilla, elected member of the Senate of the Philippines.
- Jose Maria Sison, scholar, revolutionary, and founder of the Communist Party of the Philippines.
- Franklin Drilon, Senate of the Philippines President.
- Miriam Defensor Santiago, first woman editor-in-chief of the Philippine Collegian; elected member of the Senate of the Philippines.
- Edcel C. Lagman, eight term Representative of the First District of Albay; Author of the Reproductive Health Law, and the triumvirate of human rights laws, namely: the Anti-Enforced Disappearance Law, Anti-Torture Act, and Human Rights Victims Reparation and Recognition Act.
- Wenceslao Vinzons, student leader, former governor and representative of Camarines Norte.
- Ninotchka Rosca, author of the English language novels State of War and Twice Blessed.
- Renato Constantino, historian, author of the Filipino history books, A Past Revisited and The Continuing Past.
- Leonardo Quisumbing, Associate Justice of the Supreme Court of the Philippines.
- Abraham Sarmiento, Jr., student leader.
- Reynato Puno, Supreme Court of the Philippines Chief Justice.
- Temario Rivera, Former professor of political science at the University of the Philippines Diliman; author of Landlords and Capitalists: Class, Family and State in Philippine Manufacturing.
- Sheila Coronel, journalist, founder of Philippine Center for Investigative Journalism.
- Ma. Lourdes C. Mangahas, founder of Philippine Center for Investigative Journalism.
- Michael Purugganan, Professor of Biology and Dean for Science at the New York University.
- Joker Arroyo, elected member of the Senate of the Philippines.
- Arturo Tolentino, representative, elected member of the Senate of the Philippines, Minister of Foreign Affairs, and Vice President of the Philippines.
- Benigno Aquino Jr., elected member of the Senate of the Philippines; martyr; namesake of Ninoy Aquino International Airport.
- Jovito Salonga, Senate of the Philippines President.
- Homobono Adaza, former Governor of Misamis Oriental, Assemblyman, Commissioner of Immigration; author of 12 published books and former columnist of the Manila Times.
- Pacifico Agabin, former dean of the University of the Philippines College of Law, leading constitutional lawyer.
- Emmanuel F. Esguerra, former Deputy Director-General of NEDA and a UP Professor of Economics.
- Salvador Carlota, former dean of the University of the Philippines College of Law.
- Nelson A. Navarro, leading biographer and author.
- Luis V. Teodoro, former dean of the UP College of Mass Communication, writer and author, founding chairman of Altermidya.
- Jaime C. Yambao, retired Philippine ambassador to Pakistan.
- Glenn L. Diaz, 2017 Palanca Grand Nobela Winner for The Quiet Ones.
- Kenneth Roland A. Guda, editor of progressive newspaper Pinoy Weekly.
- Joseph Thaddeus Morong, GMA Network correspondent.
- Wendell Gumban, activist and slain New People's Army militia.
- Roberto Verzola, activist and author.
- Maria Lorena Barros, poet, activist and founder of MAKIBAKA.
- Teodoro Agoncillo, historian, author of History of the Filipino People.
