= Student activism in the Philippines (1965–1972) =

Political activism during Ferdinand Marcos's presidency

Student activism in the Philippines from 1965 to 1972 played a key role in the events which led to Ferdinand Marcos' declaration of Martial Law in 1972, and the Marcos regime's eventual downfall during the events of the People Power Revolution of 1986.

A significant increase in student activism took place towards the end of 1969 and the beginning of 1970, as a result of the 1969 Philippine balance of payments crisis which sprang from the administration's debt-driven spending during Ferdinand Marcos' campaign for his second presidential term University students during this period found themselves attracted to political movements from across the political spectrum, ranging from "moderates" wanted to create change through political reforms, including church groups, civil libertarians, social democrats, and nationalist politicians; and "radicals" who wanted broader, more systemic political reforms, such as student groups associated with labor groups, or with the National Democracy movement. These differences of political orientation became less pronounced in the first three months of 1970, however, as Marcos cracked down on a series of student protests which later became known as the First Quarter Storm.

Unrest continued into the following years, and in the years 1970 and 1971 alone, student activists participated in 214 demonstrations and 39 organized class boycotts.

Marcos eventually suspended the privilege of the writ of habeas corpus in 1971, and then finally placed the entire Philippine archipelago under Martial Law in September 1972.

== The First Quarter Storm (1970) and pre-Martial Law student activism (1970–1972) ==
=== Background causes ===
When he was first elected president of the Philippines in 1965 and throughout most of his first term in office, Ferdinand Marcos was relatively popular, both among the general public and among students. However, Marcos' ambition to be the first Philippine postwar president to be elected led to his use of extreme measures, including massive borrowing to fund government projects during the 1969 presidential campaign. Marcos spent $50 million worth in debt-funded infrastructure, triggering a balance of payments crisis. The Marcos administration ran to the International Monetary Fund (IMF) for help, and the IMF offered a debt restructuring deal. New policies, including a greater emphasis on exports and the relaxation of controls of the peso, were put in place. The Peso was allowed to float to a lower market value, resulting in drastic inflation, and social unrest.

Marcos won the election, but just as the election results were being counted, the government was falling into debt, inflation was uncontrolled and the value of the peso continued to drop. The slight increase of the minimum wage was countered by continuous price increases and unemployment. The economic crisis eventually took its toll and triggered growing public unrest, with students at the forefront of protest efforts.

=== "Moderate" and "radical" opposition groups ===
Students were at the forefront of several protest movements with varying political orientations, collectively becoming one of the most active elements in the political scene of the time. In the years 1970 and 1971 alone, student activists participated in 214 demonstrations and 39 class boycotts, and as reported in The Manila Times, issued 72 statements. They joined forces and established coalitions with reformists and radical factions of working classes and even participated in 76 demonstrations alongside farmers and workers.

The media reports of the time classified the various student groups opposing Marcos into two categories. The "Moderates", which included church groups, civil libertarians, and mainstream nationalists, were those who wanted to create change through political reforms. The "radicals", including a number of labor and student groups associated with the National Democracy movement, wanted broader, more systemic political reforms.

=== Calls for Reform ===
Student groups calling for social reform, particularly the National Union of Students of the Philippines (NUSP), were the dominant force in the earliest student protests of the late 1960s.

Student demonstrators during the January 27, 1970 SONA protests, for example, made a manifesto for the constitutional convention, containing the following provisions:

- the non-partisan election of delegates to the national convention
- the non-partisan composition of poll inspectors and provincial board of canvassers
- public officials who will run as candidates should be made to resign or forfeit their seats upon filing of candidacy
- the Commission on Elections (COMELEC) must regulate the election propaganda and expense of the candidates
- the delegates to the convention must be made ineligible to run for any public office in the elections immediately after the convention
- the age requirement of delegates should be lowered from 25 to 21 years old.

==== "Moderate" or "Reformist" groups ====
Student groups considered "moderate" at the time included:

- the NUSP,
- the National Students League (NSL), and
- the Young Christian Socialists Movement (CSM), a communitarian-socialist organization.

=== Calls for radical change ===
The other broad category of student groups who participated in the first quarter storm were those who wanted broader, more systemic political reforms, usually as part of the National Democracy movement and the Communist Party of the Philippines. These groups were branded "radicals" by the media, although the Marcos administration also used that term to describe "moderate" protest groups, treating all the student groups as extremists regardless of their actual position.

==== Background: Formation of the Communist Party of the Philippines ====
During the time when the Marxist Leninist Partido Komunista ng Pilipinas (PKP) was the dominant communist formation in the Philippines, its mostly dismissed students as "unneeded." There were small underground cells in some schools that played support roles to the more important and bigger Party cells in the factories and among the peasantry.

The political value of students was recognized more by the Americans who realized that students were adept as publicity (propaganda) and pressure groups for government reforms and against the PKP-led Huk rebellion of the 1950s. The PKP only began recognizing their importance in the 1960s when self-taught Marxists spearheaded an anti-clerical and nationalist campaign at the University of the Philippines. Radicals who were brought into the Party's fold formed Kabataang Makabayan (KM) in 1964.

Shortly thereafter, however, this youth faction was expelled from the party. Led by Jose Maria Sison, they split from the PKP and formed the Communist Party of the Philippines along the lines of Marxist–Leninist–Mao Zedong Thought. This new party's most immediate concern was cadre recruitment and training; being a party composed of practically urban intellectuals and students who lacked revolutionary experience.

==== "Radical" groups ====
Groups considered "radical" at the time included:

- the Kabataang Makabayan (KM),
- the Samahang Demokratiko ng Kabataan (SDK),
- the Student Cultural Association of the University of the Philippines (SCAUP),
- the Movement for Democratic Philippines (MDP),
- the Student Power Assembly of the Philippines (SPAP), and
- the Malayang Pagkakaisa ng Kabataang Pilipino (MPKP).

=== Involvement of students in pre-Martial law protests ===
==== 1970 SONA protest ====
The protest during Ferdinand Marcos' Fifth State of the Nation Address on January 26, 1970, was primarily organized by the National Union of Students of the Philippines (NUSP), and was meant to coincide with the first State of the Nation Address of Marcos' second term. In addition to "moderate" groups such as the NUSP, who wanted Marcos to promise he would not seek power beyond the two terms allowed him by the 1935 Philippine Constitution; the organizers also invited more "radical" groups such as the Kabataang Makabayan, who wanted more systemic political reforms.

The protest was largely peaceful until the end of the planned program, after which there was a disagreement between the moderate and the radical groups for control over the protest stage. This disagreement was ongoing when Marcos, having finished his speech, walked out the legislative building. President Marcos was jeered by the already-agitated crowd, which started throwing pebbles, paper balls, and protest effigies at Marcos and his retinue. Marcos and his wife Imelda were eventually able to escape to the presidential limousine, leaving the Manila Police District (MPD) and elements of the Philippine Constabulary Metropolitan Command (METROCOM) to disperse the crowd. This led to hours of confrontation between the protesters and the police, ending with at least two students confirmed dead and several more students injured.

==== The Battle of Mendiola ====
On January 30, 1970, some 10,000 students and laborers marched across Mendiola Bridge in an attempt to storm the Malacañang. Upon their arrival at the gates of the palace, they commandeered a fire truck and rammed it through the main gate. Despite their efforts to penetrate the palace, the Metropolitan Command (METROCOM) of the Philippine Constabulary repulsed them towards Mendiola Bridge. Primitivo Mijares, in The Conjugal Dictatorship of Ferdinand and Imelda Marcos, recounts that what followed was the so-called "Battle of Mendiola," which pitted young boys and girls armed with bamboo sticks and stones against Armalite-wielding 'shock troops' of Marcos from the Presidential Guard Battalion. "It was a massacre", he adds.

Ironically, this coincided with a meeting of reformist student protesters with President Marcos, which ended in Marcos losing his temper at student leader Edgar Jopson, who dared to ask Marcos for a written commitment not to stand for reelection or reappointment if ever a new constitution is ratified. Jopson's car, which he had parked outside near the Mendiola gate, was among the vehicles damaged during the violence of the Battle of Mendiola.

==== The Diliman Commune ====
The Diliman Commune was a nine-day uprising at the University of the Philippines-Diliman from February 1 to February 9, 1971. It started out as a peaceful rally in which students voiced their support for the ongoing strike against the oil price hike and escalated into an uprising in which students, supported by the school administration, protested against military incursions into the university.

==== The 1971 Habeas Corpus suspension ====
On August 21, 1971, four grenades were hurled at the stage of the Liberal Party's grand miting de avance at Plaza Miranda in Quiapo, Manila, killing nine and wounding 95 others, including most of the Party's leaders and senatorial candidates. Opposition forces blamed Marcos for the attack, while Marcos blamed communists. Marcos cited the unrest and confusion of the bombing's aftermath as a reason to suspend the writ of habeas corpus a month later. Numerous student activists were arrested, but those who got away were radicalized – convinced that there was no other way to bring about social change but to join the armed resistance against the Marcos administration. By the time Habeas Corpus was restored in January 1972, talks of an imminent revolution were already rife. The military used the suspension of the writ of habeas corpus to their advantage to arrest well-known activists such as Luzvimindo David of KM and Gary Olivar of the Movement for a Democratic Philippines (MDP) and swoop down on headquarters of several mass movements.

==== Continuous protests (1970–1972) ====
In the years 1970 and 1971 alone, student activists participated in 214 demonstrations and 39 organized class boycotts. Among the most significant of these were the rallies organized by civil libertarians under the banner of the Movement of Concerned Citizens for Civil Liberties (MCCCL) led by nationalist senator Jose W. Diokno. Students joined the protests in alliance with progressive Constitutional Convention delegates, students, professionals, workers to demand: a) lifting the writ of habeas corpus; b) release of political prisoners; and c) resistance of plan by Marcos government to declare martial law.

== Radicalization of "Moderate" students ==
Although the earliest protests of 1970 were initially led by "moderate" student movements, the dynamics of the political conflicts soon led to the increased prominence of "radical" groups.

Violent dispersals of various FQS protests were among the first watershed events in which large numbers of Filipino students of the 1970s were radicalized against the Marcos administration. Due to these dispersals, many students who had previously held "moderate" positions (i.e., calling for legislative reforms), such as like Edgar Jopson, became convinced that they had no choice but to call for more radical social change. The most organized nationwide resistance force against the Marcos dictatorship was the New People's Army of the Communist Party of the Philippines. While groups with other ideologies, such as the Light-A-Fire Movement and the August 6 Liberation Movement, also eventually organized an armed resistance, they had only a few members and had no resources to organize student wings. (On the island of Mindanao, there was also the armed resistance of the Moro National Liberation Front and the later Moro Islamic Liberation Front, which called for Muslim Independence.)

Other watershed events which would convince students to join the underground resistance include the February 1971 Diliman Commune; the August 1971 suspension of the writ of habeas corpus in the wake of the Plaza Miranda bombing; the September 1972 declaration of Martial Law; the 1980 murder of Macli-ing Dulag; and the August 1983 assassination of Ninoy Aquino.

In the aftermath of all these events, Marcos lumped all of the opposition together and referred to them as communists, and many former moderates fled to the mountain encampments of the radical opposition to avoid being arrested by Marcos' forces. Those who became disenchanted with the excesses of the Marcos administration and wanted to join the opposition after 1971 often joined the ranks of the radicals, simply because they represented the only group vocally offering opposition to the Marcos government.

== Student activism during the Martial Law Years (1972–1986) ==
=== The underground movement ===
Marcos' initial suspension of the privilege of the writ of Habeas Corpus in 1971 after the Plaza Miranda Bombing involved the arrest of both moderate and radical activists, compelling many of them to go into hiding. Although a few of those who went into hiding did so individually, many felt compelled to join the armed resistance organized by the Communist Party of the Philippines and its New People's Army. This became referred to as going "underground," or "u.g.", and activists who had done so were referred to as "namundok" (lit. "having gone to the mountains").

=== "Middle force" opposition ===
While the better-organized underground movement was strongly associated with the national democracy movement specifically and the left in general, those who had largely been apolitical or were associated with the political center during the early days of Martial Law eventually galvanized into a "third force" or "mainstream opposition" which would primarily use political protest as a way to oppose the dictatorship. Once again, youth activism played an important role in the early development these "middle forces," as the arrest of several students of the Student Catholic Action youth organization during the 1974 Sacred Heart Novitiate raid served as a turning point for the mainstream opposition to organize more proactively against the dictatorship.

== Aftermath of Martial Law and EDSA (1972–1986) ==
On September 21, 1972, Marcos declared Martial Law. Martial Law under Ferdinand Marcos saw the extensive use of military abuse to suppress of dissent, and captured activists often became the subject of the dictatorship's many human rights violations. Journalist Gregg Jones writes that "Martial law left the once-formidable legal protest movement in disarray, its leaders in hiding or in prison, its activists driven into the underground or cowering in fear."

Nonetheless, many activists concluded that the regime had to be fought through force, and joined the underground movement against Marcos.

Others found organizations which retained some ability to question the dictatorship, including religious groups such as those organized under the influential Roman Catholic church, and lawyer's groups such as the Free Legal Assistance Group. It was through such groups that news of corruption, military abuse, and human rights violations was able to reach the international community, which put pressure on Marcos to enact reforms.

One important turning point in the Philippine Catholic church's resistance to the Marcos dictatorship was the military raid on the Sacred Heart Novitiate in the Novaliches district of Quezon City on August 24, 1974 which took place because the Marcos regime's forces had mistakenly thought that a communist leader was holding a meeting there. When the 150 soldiers who conducted the raid found that the communist leader they were looking for was not at the seminary, they arrested 21 leaders of a youth group called Student Catholic Action (SCA), who were at the seminary to attend a workshop, as well as the head of the Jesuit order in the Philippines at the time, Benigno "Benny" Mayo, and a priest, Jose Blanco, whom they falsely accused of being the "secretary general of an allegedly anti-government organization." The outrage arising from the raid was one of the key contributors to the emergence of the "middle force" of the opposition to Ferdinand Marcos, which were willing to work towards the dictator's ouster but were not part of the leftist opposition which had led the movement against Marcos up until that point.

By the closing years of the 1970s, economic crises arising from Marcos' debt-driven projects during the pre-Martial Law years led to a resurgence of social unrest despite Martial law still being in force. And, as Greg Jones notes, "communist efforts to rebuild an urban protest movement were beginning to bear fruit."

The prominence of student groups continued into the eighties when the economic nosedive and the assassination of Marcos' political rival Ninoy Aquino forced Marcos to declare a snap election in 1986, in which Ninoy Aquino's wife Corazon Aquino ran against Marcos. When news of election rigging during that election began to come out, the Philippine public began to rally behind Aquino. When a failed military coup provided the impetus for people to gather en masse, the gathering quickly snowballed into the People Power Revolution which removed Marcos from the presidency and put a revolutionary government under Aquino in power in his place.

== Student activism in universities ==
=== Ateneo de Davao University (ADDU) ===
Ateneo De Davao became one of the centers of activism in Mindanao during the dangerous days of the Marcos dictatorship. Some key campus figures would later be honored at the Philippines' Bantayog ng mga Bayani, which honors the martyrs and heroes which fought for democracy against the authoritarian regime. This included Atty. Larry Ilagan, an alumnus of the ADDU Law School who became a prominent Human Rights Lawyer with the Free Legal Assistance Group; Economics professor and union organizer Eduardo Lanzona, who was arrested in Davao Del Norte and eventually killed by Marcos' forces in 1975; Activist Maria Socorro Par who pushed for the restoration of the student council and school paper Atenews in the mid-1970s after they had been shut down in martial law, and Atenews editor-in-chief Evella Bontia; Law School alumnus Nicolas Solana Jr., and ADDU high school alumnus Ricky Filio and Joel Jose.

=== Ateneo de Manila University (AdMU) ===
Several activists from the Ateneo de Manila University (AdMU), most notably Edgardo Gil "Edjop" Jopson, founder of the single biggest student union at the time, National Union of Students of the Philippines (NUSP) and Ferdidand "Ferdie" Arceo, founder of Ligang Demokratiko ng Ateneo (LDA), played vital roles in campaigning to overthrow the dictatorship.

Among the other well-known activists from the university include Lazaro "Lazzie" Silva Jr. of the Samahang Demokratiko ng Kabataan sa Loyola (SDK-L); William "Bill" Begg, of Kabataang Makabayan-Ateneo (KM), Manny Yap of Lakasdiwa, Dante Perez of the National Union of Students of the Philippines, and Artemio "Jun" Celestial Jr. of Student Catholic Action, who was also the secretary-general of the student government.

Jopson, Arceo, Silva, Begg, Yap, Perez, and Celestial have all since been honored by having their names etched on the Wall of Remembrance at the Philippines' Bantayog ng mga Bayani, which honors the heroes and martyrs who fought the Marcos dictatorship.

==== Founding of Ligang Demokratiko ng Ateneo (LDA) ====
Ferdie, together with like-minded students in AdMU, established LDA in 1970, the first radical activist organization in Ateneo. Members conducted discussion groups, recruited students, advised student leaders, and created a space for dialogue among members of the student body. Eventually, LDA split into two separate organizations, SDK-L and KM.

==== The National Union of Students (NUSP) Iloilo Conference ====
During the NUSP's 13th annual conference in 1969, Edjop was elected as president. When delegates returned to Manila, they led a huge rally in front of congress; all while President Marcos was delivering his State of the Nation Address (SONA).

Under Edjop's two-term tenure, the National Union became participative in socio-political issues amidst the First Quarter Storm that brought forth the Second Propaganda Movement.

=== De La Salle University (DLSU) ===
At the De La Salle University, then De La Salle College, student activists clashed with the school administration over matters involving the Brother Becker Case, NROTC, tuition fees, and student rights and academic freedom. The activists questioned the elitist orientation of the institution and campaigned for a more nationalistic education.

==== The Filipinization of Education ====
The prevalence of the affluent was one of the issues that was brought up in the 1960s; it was a question of whether the "wide-cross section of the public" could be "represented." Questioning why a Philippine institution had an administrator who was American, textbooks that were written by foreigners, and instruction that was done in English, student activists urged the administration to adopt a "more nationalistic" stance. Included in this was their call for the "Filipinization of education" by ousting non-Filipino presidents of schools, colleges, and universities, and appointing qualified Filipinos to head the institutions in their place.

==== The Brother Becker Case ====
On Friday afternoon of December 6, 1968, more than 600 students held a four-hour demonstration to show their support for Brother Edward Becker FSC who was dismissed by the college. They circulated leaflets which divulged the imputations hurled against Becker.

This case provided the students the opportunity to voice their concerns regarding academic freedom as well as student rights. Arthur Aguilar, Student Council chairman, eventually managed to steer the dialogue away from the Becker case, in a meeting with Brother H. Gabriel Connon FSC and Dr. Waldo Perfecto, academic vice-president, on December 8, 1968, during the feast of the Immaculate Conception. He declared that the "issue was only incidental and the Becker case was merely a catalyst, the 'final straw' so to speak which ignited student protest over school policies."

==== Reserve Officers' Training Corps (ROTC) ====
On July 17, 1971, some 600 cadets refused to attend an NROTC drill, with their refusal stemming from their dissatisfaction with the present NROTC system as well as their protest against the hazing of Shore Patrol trainees by probationary officers. The Student Council backed this boycott in a resolution.

=== Maryknoll College (MC) ===
During the Marcos dictatorship, the community of Maryknoll College (now known as Miriam College) was known for being one of the Catholic educational institutions most active in protesting the abuses and excesses of the regime. A prominent leader was Sr Helen Graham, who became a founding member of Task Force Detainees of the Philippines after one of her students was picked up as a political detainee. Another Maryknoll figure of the resistance of the dictatorship was High School alumnus Suellen Escribano, who gave up her life of comfort in order to serve the women and farmers living in the border area of Quezon and Bicol provinces, helping them resist the efforts of landgrabbers. The significance Escribano's work would later be recognized by the Philippines' Bantayog ng mga Bayani, which honors the martyrs and heroes that fought to restore democracy during the regime. The Maryknoll sisters were prominent in the crowd that formed the People Power revolution of 1986, which led to the ouster of the Marcos family, and Sr. Helen Graham's diary entries were later published by the Philippine Daily Inquirer as a day by day breakdown of the events as they happened.

=== Pamantasan ng Lungsod ng Maynila (PLM) ===
When Marcos declared martial law in September 1972, the Pamantasan ng Lungsod ng Maynila had already seen its share of protests, but it was student journalist Liliosa Hilao, who had not been able to attend any protests due to health limitations who became the first of Marcos' political detainees to die while in prison. Philippine Constabulary soldiers had arrested her and her sister Josefina in a warrantless arrest in April 1973. Three days later, the Hilao family was informed that Liliosa had died of suicide, but her body showed signs of severe torture, leading her to be acknowledged as one of the early victims of the human rights abuses of the Marcos dictatorship. Other PLM students who were killed for their opposition to the dictatorship included the brothers Roy and Norberto Acebedo, who joined activist groups because they were aghast at the abuses of the regime, but were themselves killed by administration soldiers in separate incidents in 1975 and 1985.

=== University of Mindanao (UM) ===
The main campus of the private, non-sectarian University of Mindanao in Davao City was one of the earliest centers of student activism in Mindanao during the Marcos years, with a notable incident in mid-February 1971 now known as "The Battle of Claro M. Recto," so named after the street nearby the campus in which most of the protest took place. It began with a typical protest, where the UM Student Council denounced tuition and miscellaneous fee increases and the slow progress of improvements to school facilities. Things became violent, however, when a student who was speaking on stage, Edgar Ang Sinco was suddenly shot and killed by what witnesses said was a policeman. His death sparked outrage throughout the city, and students spent the next two days protesting in the area of Bolton, Bangkerohan, and Claro M. Recto streets near the campus, particularly the area near the United States Information Service on CM Recto. Ang Sinco would later be considered Davao's first martyr of the fight against the Marcos dictatorship.

Other prominent student activists from UM were student playwright Herbert Cayunda and stage performer Cecilio Reyes of the Gintong Silahis (GS) cultural group, Rhyme Petalcorin of the Young Christian Liberation Movement (YCLM), all of whom were later forced to go into hiding during Martial Law because Marcos' forces were hunting down student activists, and all of whom were killed in various incidents between 1975 and 1876. Ang Sinco, Cayunda, Reyes, and Petalcorin were all later honored by having their names inscribed on the wall of remembrance at the Philippines' Bantayog ng mga Bayani, which honors the martyrs and heroes who fought for the restoration of democracy in the Philippines despite the dangers of the Martial Law years.

=== University of the Philippines Diliman (UP Diliman) ===
As far back as the 1950s, the University of the Philippines has been the breeding ground of many intellectuals and radical activists. It comes as no surprise, then, that in the 1960s and 1970s, the university played an active role in conducting demonstrations, marches, and rallies to raise awareness of sectoral struggles and to campaign against the Marcos dictatorship and land reform policy, among others. Some of the clear examples of the school's activism include the ratifying of the Diliman Declaration in March 1969.

Student activists from the university stirred up the masses of youth and the working class to conduct protest actions, from the March 1961 demonstration of 5,000 UP student demonstrators that scuttled the anti-communist witch-hunt of the Committee on Anti-Filipino Activities (CAFA) to the 1970 First Quarter Storm that rocked the National Capital Region with almost weekly marches and rallies of 50,000 to 100,000 people campaigning against the administration. Among the youth organizations that were active include Student Christian Movement of the Philippines, College Editors Guild of the Philippines, League of Filipino Students, and NUSP.

==== The Diliman Commune ====
In 1971, students who formed the "Diliman Commune", supported by faculty members and non-academic personnel, occupied the Diliman campus and barricaded roads to protest deteriorating conditions in the country during the administration.

Salvador P. Lopez, then-president of the University of the Philippines, urged his students, faculty, and employees to maintain the autonomy of the university as the military sought control of the campus in order to identify suspected leftists, activists, and critiques.

=== University of the Philippines Los Baños (UPLB) ===
When martial law was declared in September 1972, Marcos cracked down on any form of criticism or activism, leading to the arrest, torture and/or killing of numerous UP Los Baños students and faculty members. Those killed included Modesto "Bong" Sison, and Manuel Bautista, while Aloysius Baes was among those who were arrested and tortured. Campus journalist Antero Santos was killed while being chased by Marcos forces. Those who went missing ("desaparecidos"), meanwhile, included Tish Ladlad, Cristina Catalla, Gerardo "Gerry" Faustino, Rizalina Ilagan, Ramon Jasul, and Jessica Sales.

== Student activism in high schools ==
Given the increasing awareness of dire social conditions during the Marcos dictatorship, anger about social issues extended even into high school campuses, such as the San Beda High School and the Philippine Science High School Main Campus. Some of the more prominent examples of high school students who became activists were Alexander Belone II, Francis Sontillano, Lorenzo "Nik" Lansang, Marcelino Villanueva, Nimfa "Nona" B. del Rosario, Pastor Mesina, Rodelo "Delo" Manaog, and Ronald Jan Quimpo, all of whom would later be honored by having their names inscribed at the Bantayog ng mga Bayani.

== Portrayals in media ==
Numerous books and films have prominently portrayed student activism in the Philippines during the Marcos years, including the Jose Dalisay Jr. novel "Killing Time in a Warm Place", the Lualhati Bautista novel "Dekada '70" and the Chito S. Roño film based on it, the Aureus Solito film Pisay, and the Kip Oebanda film Liway.
