= History of the Philippines (1965–1986) =

The history of the Philippines from 1965 to 1986, known as the Marcos era, covers the unitary government and the dictatorship of Ferdinand Marcos. The Marcos era includes the final years of the Third Republic (1965–1972), the Philippines under martial law (1972–1981), and the majority of the Fourth Republic (1981–1986). By the end of the Marcos era, the country was experiencing a debt crisis, extreme poverty, and severe underemployment.

== Marcos administration (1965–1972) ==
=== First term ===
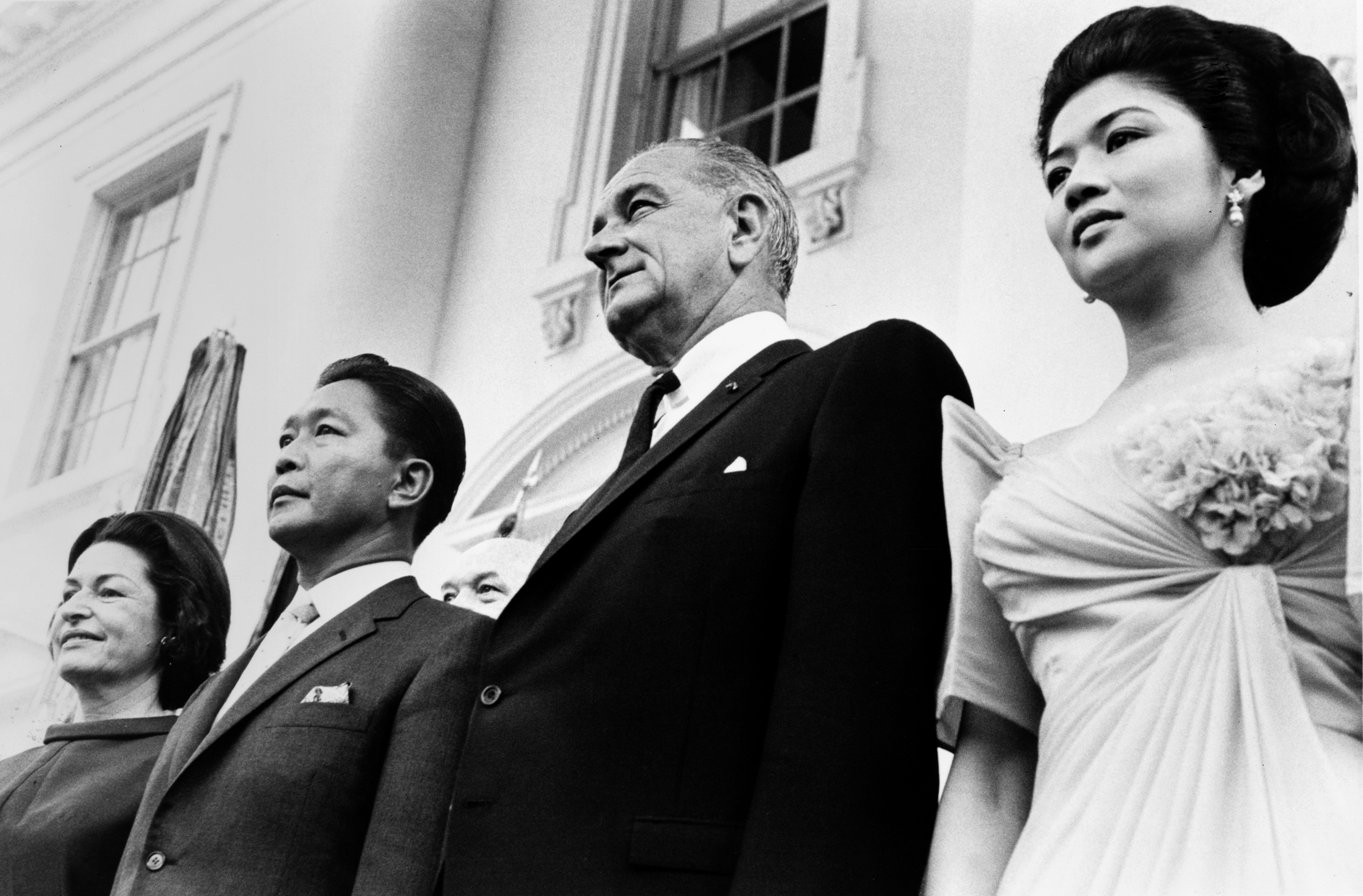
Ferdinand and Imelda Marcos with Lyndon B. Johnson and Lady Bird Johnson during a visit to the United States

In 1965, Ferdinand Marcos won the presidential election and became the 10th president of the Philippines. His first term was marked with increased industrialization and the construction of nationwide infrastructure, including the creation of the North Luzon Expressway and the continuation of the Maharlika Highway (Pan-Philippine Highway).

In 1968, Senator Benigno Aquino Jr. warned that Marcos was on the road to establishing "a garrison state" by "ballooning the armed forces budget," saddling the defense establishment with "overstaying generals" and "militarizing our civilian government offices." These were prescient comments in the light of events that would happen in the following decade.

During the Vietnam War, Marcos strongly opposed sending military forces to Vietnam. Under intense pressure from US President Lyndon Johnson, Marcos sent a Filipino noncombatant military force to the Republic of Vietnam in 1966, under the Philippine Civic Action Group (PHILCAG). As the war was proving to be unpopular among Filipinos, Marcos ordered the withdrawal of the PHILCAG in November 1969.

=== Second term ===
In 1969, Marcos ran for a second term – the last one allowed him under the 1935 constitution which was then in effect. He won by a landslide against 11 other candidates.

But Marcos' massive spending during the 1969 presidential campaign had taken its toll and triggered growing public unrest. During the campaign, Marcos had spent US$50 million for debt-funded infrastructure, triggering the 1969 Philippine balance of payments crisis. The Marcos administration ran to the International Monetary Fund (IMF) for help, and the IMF offered a debt restructuring deal. New policies, including a greater emphasis on exports and the relaxation of controls of the peso, were put in place. The peso was allowed to float to a lower market value, resulting in drastic inflation, and social unrest.

In February 1971, student activists took over the Diliman campus of the University of the Philippines and declared it a free commune. Protests during the First Quarter Storm in 1970 resulted in clashes and violent dispersals by the national police.

During the First Quarter Storm in 1970, the line between leftist activists and communists became increasingly blurred, as a significant number of Kabataang Makabayan (KM) advanced activists joined the Communist Party of the Philippines founded by Jose Maria Sison. KM members protested in front of Congress, throwing a coffin, a stuffed alligator, and stones at Ferdinand and Imelda Marcos after his State of the Nation Address. At the presidential palace, activists rammed the gate with a fire truck and once the gate broke and gave way, the activists charged into the palace grounds tossing rocks, pillboxes and Molotov cocktails. In front of the U.S. embassy, protesters vandalized, burned, and damaged the embassy lobby resulting in a strong protest from the U.S. ambassador. The KM protests ranged from 50,000 to 100,000 in number per weekly mass action. In the aftermath of the January 1970 riots, at least two activists were confirmed dead and several were injured by the police. The mayor of Manila at the time, Antonio Villegas, commended the Manila Police District for their "exemplary behavior and courage" and protecting the First Couple long after they had left. The death of the activists was seized by the Lopez controlled Manila Times and Manila Chronicle, blaming Marcos and added fire to the weekly protests. Students declared a week-long boycott of classes and instead met to organize protest rallies.

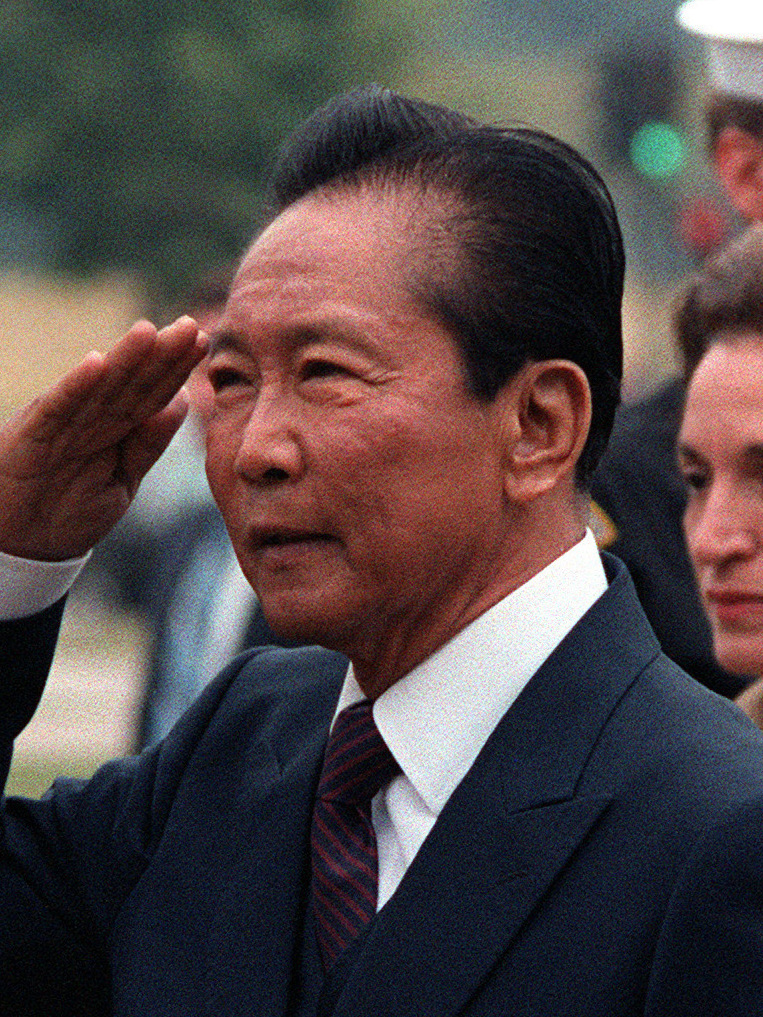
Ferdinand Marcos (pictured), President of the Philippines from 1965 to 1986

Rumors of a coup d'état were also brewing. A report of the U.S. Senate Foreign Relations Committee said that shortly after the 1969 Philippine presidential election, a group composed mostly of retired colonels and generals organized a revolutionary junta to first discredit President Marcos and then kill him. As described in a document given to the committee by Philippine Government official, key figures in the plot were Vice President Fernando Lopez and Sergio Osmeña Jr., whom Marcos defeated in the 1969 election. Marcos even went to the U.S. embassy to dispel rumors that the U.S. embassy is supporting a coup d'état which the opposition, the Liberal Party of the Philippines, was spreading. While the report obtained by the New York Times speculated that story could be used by Marcos to justify martial law, as early as December 1969 in a message from the U.S. ambassador to the U.S. assistant secretary of state, the U.S. ambassador said that most of the talk about revolution and even assassination has been coming from the defeated opposition, of which Adevoso (of the Liberal Party) is a leading activist. He also said that the information he has on the assassination plans are 'hard' or well-sourced and he has to make sure that it reached President Marcos.

In light of the crisis, Marcos wrote an entry in his diary in January 1970:

I have several options. One of them is to abort the subversive plan now by the sudden arrest of the plotters. But this would not be accepted by the people. Nor could we get the Huks (Communists), their legal cadres and support. Nor the MIM (Maoist International Movement) and other subversive [or front] organizations, nor those underground. We could allow the situation to develop naturally then after massive terrorism, wanton killings and an attempt at my assassination and a coup d'etat, then declare martial law or suspend the privilege of the writ of habeas corpus – and arrest all including the legal cadres. Right now I am inclined towards the latter.

=== Plaza Miranda bombing ===
On August 21, 1971, the Liberal Party held a campaign rally at the Plaza Miranda to proclaim their senatorial bets and their candidate for the mayoralty of Manila. Two grenades were reportedly tossed on stage, injuring almost everybody present. As a result, Marcos suspended the writ of habeas corpus to arrest those behind the attack. He rounded up supposed suspects and other undesirables to eliminate rivals in the Liberal Party.

Marcos accused the communist movement as the perpetrators of the bombing, and responded by suspending the writ of habeas corpus. Declassified documents from the U.S. Central Intelligence Agency also implicate Marcos in at least one of the deadly series of bombings in 1971. For historian Joseph Scalice, he argued that while the Marcos government was allied with the Partido Komunista ng Pilipinas (PKP) in carrying out bombings in the early 1970s, "the evidence of history now overwhelmingly suggests that the Communist Party of the Philippines, despite being allied with the Liberal Party, was responsible for this bombing, seeing it as a means of facilitating repression which they argued would hasten revolution."

=== Alleged ambush of Juan Ponce Enrile ===
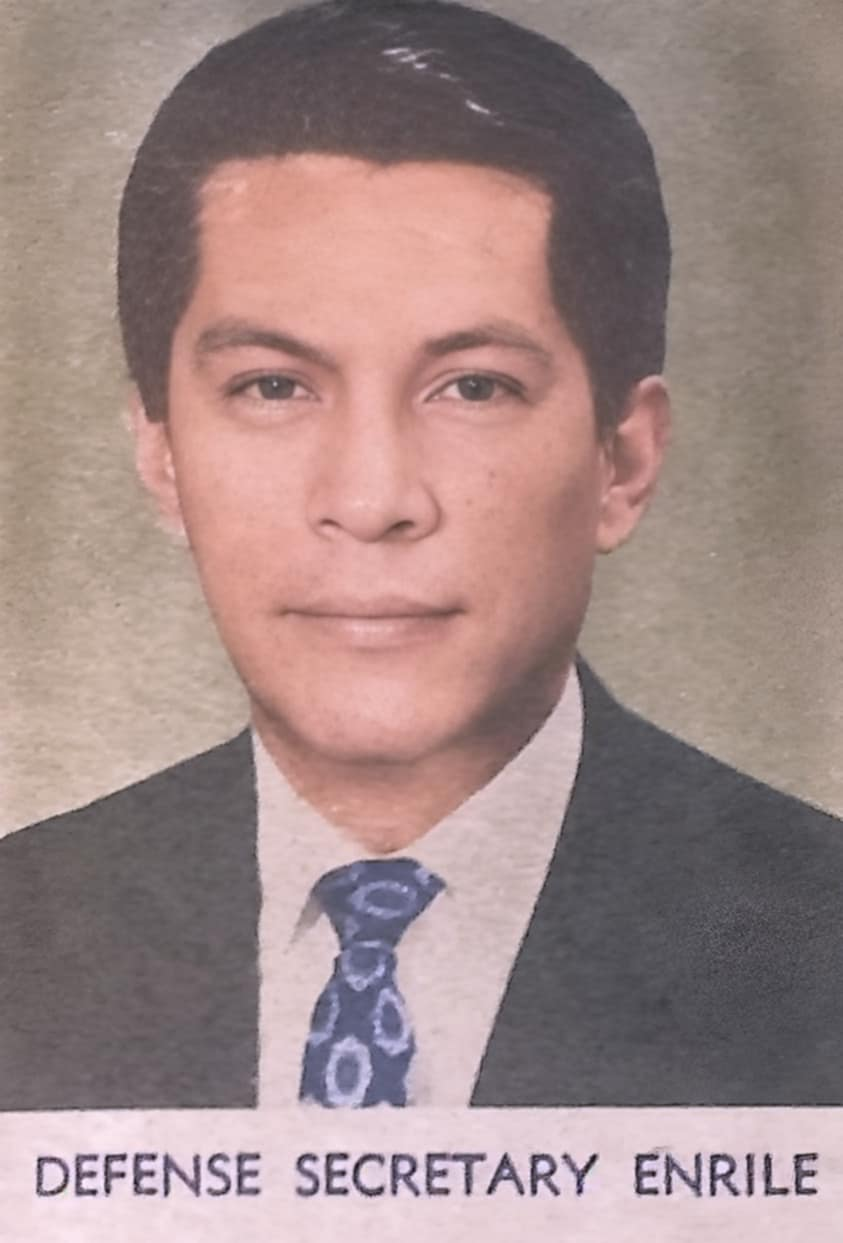
Juan Ponce Enrile

On the night of September 22, 1972, Defense Minister Juan Ponce Enrile was allegedly ambushed while on his way home. The assassination attempt was widely believed to have been staged; Enrile himself admitted to the assassination attempt to have been staged but he would later retract his claim.

== Martial law (1972–1981) ==
The Plaza Miranda bombing, the alleged ambush of Enrile, and the MV Karagatan landing were among the incidents used to justify the imposition of martial law. The alleged assassination attempt of Enrile together with the general citizen disquiet, were used by Marcos as reasons to issue Presidential Proclamation No. 1081, proclaiming a state of martial law in the Philippines on September 21.

Facing further criticism, Marcos claimed that his declaration of Martial Law was supported by esteemed Philippine statesman Senator Lorenzo Tañada, who at the time was abroad representing the Philippines at international parliamentary conferences. Upon hearing the claim, Senator Tañada debunked it and clarified that he gave no such support for the declaration.

Marcos, who thereafter ruled by decree, curtailed press freedom and other civil liberties, abolished Congress, controlled media establishments, and ordered the arrest of opposition leaders and militant activists, including his staunchest critics Senators Benigno Aquino Jr. and Jose W. Diokno, virtually turning the Philippines into a totalitarian dictatorship with Marcos. Initially, the declaration of martial law was well received, given the social turmoil of the period. Crime rates decreased significantly after a curfew was implemented. Political opponents were allowed to go into exile. As martial law went on for the next nine years, the excesses committed by the military increased. In total, there were 3,257 extrajudicial killings, 35,000 individual tortures, and 70,000 were incarcerated. It is also reported that 737 Filipinos disappeared between 1975 and 1985.

Though it was claimed that martial law was no military take-over of the government, the immediate reaction of some sectors of the nation was of astonishment and dismay, for even though it was claimed that the gravity of the disorder, lawlessness, social injustice, youth and student activism, and other disturbing movements had reached a point of peril, they felt that martial law over the whole country was not yet warranted. Worse, political motivations were ascribed to be behind the proclamation, since the then constitutionally non-extendable term of President Marcos was about to expire. This suspicion became more credible when opposition leaders and outspoken anti-Marcos media people were immediately placed under indefinite detention in military camps and other unusual restrictions were imposed on travel, communication, freedom of speech and the press, etc. In a word, the martial law regime was anathema to no small portion of the populace.

It was in the light of the above circumstances and as a means of solving the dilemma aforementioned that the concept embodied in Amendment No. 6, giving the President emergency power in case of a threat or imminence to issue necessary decrees, orders which shall be part of law of the land, was born in the Constitution of 1973. In brief, the central idea that emerged was that martial law might be earlier lifted, but to safeguard the Philippines and its people against any abrupt dangerous situation which would warrant some exercise of totalitarian powers, the latter must be constitutionally allowed, thereby eliminating the need to proclaim martial law and its concomitants, principally the assertion by the military of prerogatives that made them appear superior to the civilian authorities below the president. In other words, the problem was what may be needed for national survival or the restoration of normalcy in the face of a crisis or an emergency should be reconciled with the popular mentality and attitude of the people against martial law.

In a speech before his fellow alumni of the University of the Philippines College of Law, President Marcos declared his intention to lift martial law by the end of January 1981.

The reassuring words for the skeptic came on the occasion of the University of the Philippines law alumni reunion on December 12, 1980, when the president declared: "We must erase once and for all from the public mind any doubts as to our resolve to bring martial law to an end and to minister to an orderly transition to parliamentary government." The apparent forthright irrevocable commitment was cast at the 45th anniversary celebration of the Armed Forces of the Philippines on December 22, 1980, when the president proclaimed: "A few days ago, following extensive consultations with a broad representation of various sectors of the nation and in keeping with the pledge made a year ago during the seventh anniversary of the New Society, I came to the firm decision that martial law should be lifted before the end of January, 1981, and that only in a few areas where grave problems of public order and national security continue to exist will martial law continue to remain in force."

After the lifting of martial law, power remained concentrated with Marcos. One scholar noted how Marcos retained "all martial law decrees, orders, and law-making powers", including powers that allowed him to jail political opponents.

=== Human rights abuses ===
The martial law era under Marcos was marked by plunder, repression, torture, and atrocity. As many as 3,257 were murdered, 35,000 tortured, and 70,000 illegally detained according to estimates by historian Alfred McCoy. One journalist described the Marcos administration as "a grisly one-stop shop for human rights abuses, a system that swiftly turned citizens into victims by dispensing with inconvenient requirements such as constitutional protections, basic rights, due process, and evidence."

=== Economy ===
According to World Bank data, the Philippines' gross domestic product (GDP) quadrupled from $8 billion in 1972 to $32.45 billion in 1980, for an inflation-adjusted average growth rate of 6% per year. Indeed, according to the U.S.-based Heritage Foundation, the Philippines enjoyed its best economic development since 1945 between 1972 and 1980. The economy grew amidst the two severe global oil shocks following the 1973 oil crisis and 1979 energy crisis – oil price was $3 / barrel in 1973 and $39.5 in 1979, or a growth of 1200% which drove inflation. Despite the 1984–1985 recession, GDP on a per capita basis more than tripled from $175.9 in 1965 to $565.8 in 1985 at the end of Marcos' term, though this averages less than 1.2% a year when adjusted for inflation. The Heritage Foundation pointed out that when the economy began to weaken 1979, the government did not adopt anti-recessionist policies and instead launched risky and costly industrial projects.

The government had a cautious borrowing policy in the 1970s. Amid high oil prices, high interest rates, capital flight, and falling export prices of sugar and coconut, the Philippine government borrowed a significant amount of foreign debt in the early 1980s. The country's total external debt rose from US$2.3 billion in 1970 to US$26.2 billion in 1985. Marcos' critics charged that policies have become debt-driven, along with corruption and plunder of public funds by Marcos and his cronies. This held the country under a debt-servicing crisis which is expected to be fixed by only 2025. Critics have pointed out an elusive state of the country's development as the period is marred by a sharp devaluing of the Philippine Peso from 3.9 to 20.53. The overall economy experienced a slower growth GDP per capita, lower wage conditions and higher unemployment especially towards the end of Marcos' term after the 1983–1984 recession. The recession was triggered largely by political instability following the assassination of Benigno Aquino Jr., high global interest rates, the severe global economic recession, and a significant increase in global oil price, the latter three of which affected all indebted countries in Latin America and Europe, and the Philippines was not exempted. Economists noted that poverty incidence grew from 41% in the 1960s at the time Marcos took the presidency to 59% when he was removed from power.

The period is sometimes described as a golden age for the country's economy by historical distortionists. By the period's end, the country was experiencing a debt crisis, extreme poverty, and severe underemployment. On the island of Negros, which suffered what came to be called the Negros famine, one-fifth of the children under six were seriously malnourished.

=== Emigration ===
From the election of Marcos 1965 to the overthrowing of Marcos' regime in 1986, around 300,000 Filipinos emigrated out of the Philippines to the United States.

=== Corruption, plunder, and crony capitalism ===
The Philippines under martial law suffered from massive and uncontrolled corruption.

Some estimates, including that by the World Bank, put the Marcos family's stolen wealth at US$10 billion.

Plunder was achieved through the creation of government monopolies, awarding loans to cronies, forced takeover of public and private enterprises, direct raiding of the public treasury, issuance of presidential decrees that enabled cronies to amass wealth, kickbacks and commissions from businesses, use of dummy corporations to launder money abroad, skimming of international aid, and hiding of wealth in bank accounts overseas.

=== Parliamentary elections ===
The first formal elections since 1969 for an interim Batasang Pambansa (National Assembly) were held on April 7, 1978. Senator Aquino, then in jail, decided to run as leader of his party, the Lakas ng Bayan party, but they did not win any seats in the Batasan, despite public support and their apparent victory. The night before the elections, supporters of the LABAN party showed their solidarity by setting up a "noise barrage" in Manila, creating noise the whole night until dawn.

== Fourth Republic (1981–1986) ==
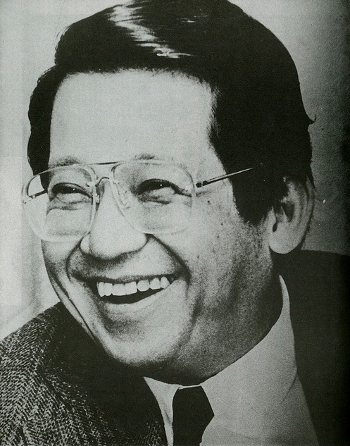
Ninoy Aquino

The opposition boycotted the June 16, 1981, presidential election, which pitted Marcos and his Kilusang Bagong Lipunan party against retired Gen. Alejo Santos of the Nacionalista Party. Marcos won by a margin of over 16 million votes, which constitutionally allowed him to have another six-year term. Finance Minister Cesar Virata was elected as prime minister by the Batasang Pambansa.

In 1983, opposition leader Benigno "Ninoy" Aquino Jr. was assassinated at Manila International Airport upon his return to the Philippines after a long period of exile in the United States. This coalesced popular dissatisfaction with Marcos and began a series of events, including pressure from the United States, that culminated in a snap presidential election on February 7, 1986. The opposition united under Aquino's widow, Corazon Aquino, and Salvador Laurel, head of the United Nationalists Democratic Organizations (UNIDO). The election was marred by widespread reports of violence and tampering with results by both sides.

The official election canvasser, the Commission on Elections (COMELEC), declared Marcos the winner, despite a walk-out staged by disenfranchised computer technicians on February 9. According to the COMELEC's final tally, Marcos won with 10,807,197 votes to Aquino's 9,291,761 votes. By contrast, the partial 70% tally of the National Citizens' Movement for Free Elections, an accredited poll watcher, said Aquino won with 7,835,070 votes to Marcos's 7,053,068.

== End of the Marcos regime ==
The 1986 Philippine presidential election was generally perceived to be fraudulent, both locally and internationally. International observers, including a U.S. delegation led by Senator Richard Lugar, denounced the official results. Corazon Aquino rejected the results and held the "Tagumpay ng Bayan" (People's Victory) rally at Luneta Park on February 16, 1986, announcing a civil disobedience campaign and calling for her supporters to boycott publications and companies which were associated with Marcos or any of his cronies. The event was attended by a crowd of about two million people. Aquino's camp began making preparations for more rallies, and Aquino herself went to Cebu to rally more people to their cause.

In the aftermath of the election and the revelations of irregularities, Defense Minister Juan Ponce Enrile and the Reform the Armed Forces Movement (RAM) – a cabal of officers of the Armed Forces of the Philippines (AFP) – set into motion a coup attempt against the Ferdinand and Imelda Marcos. However, the plot was soon discovered, and Marcos ordered Enrile and his supporters to be arrested.

Fearful of being overcome by Marcos' forces, Enrile sought help from then-AFP Vice Chief of Staff Lt. Gen Fidel Ramos, who was also the chief of the Philippine Constabulary (now the Philippine National Police). Ramos agreed and withdrew his support for the government, siding with Enrile. Their respective forces barricaded themselves in Camp Crame and Camp Aguinaldo which were near each other on either side of Epifanio de los Santos Avenue (EDSA) in Quezon City. Despite their combined forces, however, Enrile and Ramos were essentially trapped in the camps, and in the words of historian Vicente L. Rafael, "became sitting ducks for Ferdinand Marcos' loyalist forces."

A small contingent of Aquino supporters, led by her brother in law Butz Aquino, went to EDSA to express support the coup plotters, in the hope of preventing Marcos from annihilating them. At around the same time, Ramos and Enrile contacted the highly influential Archbishop of Manila, Cardinal Jaime Sin to ask for help. Cardinal Sin went on radio and encouraged people on the capital to likewise go to EDSA to support Ramos and Enrile, and crowds, already preparing to conduct election protests, trooped en masse to the stretch of EDSA between the two camps.

This evolved in the largely peaceful 1986 EDSA Revolution, which ended with Marcos going into exile in Hawaii and Corazon Aquino becoming the 11th president of the Philippines on February 25, 1986. Under Aquino, the Philippines would adopt a new constitution, ending the Fourth Republic and ushering in the beginning of the Fifth Republic.
