= NSYA =

NSYA may refer to:

- New Syrian Army, a former Syrian rebel group
- ECY-NSYA, the leadership of Student Catholic Action
