= Student Catholic Action =

Religious organization in the Philippines

Student Catholic Action of the Philippines (SCAP)
- Abbreviation: SCAP
- Formation: April 12, 1936
- Type: Catholic Youth Organization
- Affiliations: International Young Catholic Students (IYCS)
- Website: https://www.scaphilippines.org/

The Standard Orientation Program given at the SCA Office

The Student Catholic Action of the Philippines is a religious student organization in the Philippines. Its affiliation overseas is the International Young Catholic Students (IYCS), also known as International Young Christian Students in Asia, that follows the methodology of Cardinal Joseph Cardijn, the see-judge-act methodology. Known to be the first student religious organization in the Philippines, it is presently known nationwide through local dioceses and Catholic schools (public and private high schools).

It defines itself as an organized group of students striving to become a community of disciples of Jesus Christ by being evangelized and evangelizing. The cell, a small group of students, is the basic unit of the movement, and is essential to it.

Every three years, the leaders meet in a National Conference, the highest decision-making body of the movement. The Conference elects a National Coordinating Council (NCC), comprising a Cluster Coordinator together with a College Representative and a High School Representative, for a three-year term. The NCC meets twice a year. The National Secretariat comprising the executive director, Executive Secretary and the Liaison Officers for each geographic region (Luzon, the Visayas and Mindanao) run programs with the help of the National Formation Team.

As of 2014, some 300 universities, colleges and secondary schools are affiliated with the Student Catholic Action of the Philippines.

== Our Story ==
The Student Catholic Action of the Philippines (SCAP) is an organized group of students striving to become a community of disciples of Jesus Christ by being evangelized and evangelizing. We are a non-stock, nonprofit organization duly registered under the Securities and Exchange Commission (SEC) with Registration No: CN201014323. SCAP is a national student movement recognized by the Catholic Bishops Conference of the Philippines-Episcopal Commission on Youth (CBCP-ECY). It is a member of the Federation of National Youth Organizations (FNYO) and affiliated with the International Young Christian Students (IYCS) with consultative status on UNESCO and the United Nations Economic and Social Council (ECOSOC)

SCAP is a campus-based organization that forms students to become socially aware and effective leaders in the community through the five areas of concern: (1) Values Education, (2) Social Justice, (3) Environmental Sustainability, (4) Science and Technology, (5) IT and Social Media. SCAP serves more than 80 years of molding consistent student leaders for the church and society. It applies the inquiry method of see-judge-act in seeing reality and deeply reflecting its actions. The organization was founded by Columban priest, Edward McCarthy, SSC in University of the Philippines Manila. It started as a scholastic philosophy club with an aim to counter anti-Christian attacks of growing atheism in the campus on April 12, 1936.

The Student Catholic Action has its own share of Ramon Magsaysay Award laureates, in the person of Chief Justice Hilario Davide in the category of government service. SCA alumni shone in the other sectors of society. In governance, late Senator Raul Roco exemplified the virtue of Christian leadership, while CHED Commissioner Patricia Licuanan dedicated herself to education and women. SCAP also contributed many talents in the field of NGO work, such as Carmencita Abella, Magsaysay Awards Foundation President, and Fe Revita-Arriola of the Consuelo Foundation. Cardinal Luis Antonio Tagle, the 32nd Archbishop of Manila and one of two Pro-Prefects of the Dicastery for Evangelization, and Archbishop Antonio Ledesma, are inducted members.

SCAP is present in over 20 dioceses and archdiocese in the country in six clusters: Northern Luzon, Central Luzon, Southern Luzon, National Capital Region, Visayas and Mindanao.

== History ==
=== Formation and early years ===
SCA was founded in 1936 as a loosely formed city-wide association and was formally approved on April 12, 1936, by Michael O'Doherty, then-Archbishop of Manila. The first unit was formed in the University of the Philippines by Columban Father Edward J. McCarthy in 1936, where it is still active today as UPSCA-Diliman. SCA later became an organization with Chapters in most educational institutions in the Archdiocese of Manila.

Later in 1936, the organization extended its objectives to preparing Manila's students for participation in the 33rd International Eucharistic Congress.

Until the outbreak of the Second World War, SCA organized religion classes in non-sectarian schools, with special student Masses in Santa Cruz Church, and held annual rallies and regular convocations.

=== World War II ===
During the Japanese occupation of the Philippines beginning in 1942, the SCA registered with occupying authorities and continued for a time with regular student Masses, but eventually all its activities ceased.

=== Postwar era ===
==== Revival and expansion ====
After the war in 1948, SCA was recognized by the Columban Father James V. MacDevitt at the request of the Archbishop of Manila. With the immediate objective of establishing religion classes in non-sectarian and public schools, SCA was first organized in Catholic schools for the main purpose of providing the many catechists required.

In 1949, the post-war SCA was formally inaugurated at UST Chapel, with 18 Catholic schools forming the nucleus of the organization. In the first twenty years after the war, the number of member schools in the Archdiocese of Manila increased to 138 including Catholic, nonsectarian, and public schools. During the same period, SCA was extended to practically all the archdioceses and dioceses of the Philippines.

==== Consolidation ====
In 1950, the First SCA Leadership Conference was held in Baguio. Two years after, it was mandated by the Philippine hierarchy as member of the Catholic Action of the Philippines. Then, the SCA affiliated with the Pax Romana International Movement of Catholic Students in 1955. It affiliated with the International Young Catholic Students (IYCS) the next year. Leadership Training Schools were initiated by Michael Nolan, SSC in 1957. The movement hosted the Pax Romana International Conference held in Manila from December 26, 1960, to January 9, 1961, hosting members from over 44 countries. The First SCA National Congress was convened in Iloilo from May 24 to 29, 1962.

The main activity of catechetical instruction continued, but became one of many varied activities embraced in the five "SCA Areas of Concern".

=== In the Marcos dictatorship ===
==== Crisis ====
SCA started to experience crisis in 1969. Heightened student activism, culminating in the First Quarter Storm, affected the SCA especially in the ensuing martial law years. Like all student organizations at the time, the SCA was banned.

==== New life ====
In 1978, the Campus Ministry, which traces its roots from SCA, was introduced. Religious instruction was officially allowed and catechists were organized.

The SCA called for a National Conference in Cebu in 1980. It called for a National Constitutional Convention, the last attempt to retain the national coordination, in Manila in 1984. The national SCA coordination was disbanded, although diocesan coordination and units in the different parts of the country continued to exist.

=== Contemporary history ===
In the January 1989 National Conference of Youth Ministers (NCYM), the rest of the active SCA diocesan groups presented and passed a resolution requesting the Episcopal Commission on Youth – National Secretariat for Youth Apostolate (ECY-NSYA) to take charge of coordinating the existing SCA units nationwide. As a result, there was a national consultation meeting of SCA in July 1989, spearheaded by the NSYA. Jose Sumampong of Diocese of Tagbilaran was appointed as National Chaplain of SCA.

The SCA now holds archdiocesan, regional, and national conferences, and is present in more than thirty dioceses in the Philippines.

== Logo ==

The SCAP logo has a cross with rays at its center, representing Jesus Christ. The seven rays of the cross represent the Seven Sacraments. The border consists of three parallel lines, spiralling from left-below to form an arrowhead at top-right to represent the following:

Three lines: represent the three major regions of the country, namely: Luzon, Visayas and Mindanao. The Second part of the border, where the parallel lines converge to form an arrowhead, representing the Blessed Trinity.

== SCA Hymnn ==
An Army of Youth

Flying the standard of truth

We are fighting for Christ the Lord

Heads lifted high Catholic Action our cry

And the Cross our only sword

On Earth's battlefield

Never a vantage we'll yield

As dauntlessly on we swing

Comrades true Dare and Do

'Neath the Queens White and Blue

For our flag, for our faith, for Christ the King

Christ lifts His hands

The King commands, His challenge:

"Come and Follow Me!"

From every side with eager stride

We form in the lines of victory

Let foeman lurk and laggards shirk

We throw our fortunes with the Lord

Mary's Son, 'til the world is won

We have pledged you our loyal word.

"To Christ the King: Our Love and Loyalty!"

== Archdiocese of Manila ==

Public high schools In the Archdiocese of Manila participate in the movement and activities of SCA. Colleges and universities within the archdiocese have the biggest population since many schools here have been with the SCA for a long time.

The SCA-AM office is located in the San Lorenzo Ruiz Student Catholic Center on Legarda Street. As of 2014, there were 10 public high schools, 2 private schools, and 4 clusters of colleges and universities belonging to this locality.

== National presence ==
The Student Catholic Action of the Philippines is present in more than 30 archdiocese and dioceses. The National Conference and National Coordinating Council divided the country into six clusters: Northern Luzon Cluster, Central Luzon Cluster, Southern Luzon Cluster, Visayas Cluster, Mindanao Cluster and National Capital Region Cluster.

Northern Luzon Cluster: 1. Diocese of Baguio-Benguet 2. Diocese of Alaminos, Pangasinan 3. Diocese of Abra, Bangued

Central Luzon Cluster: 1. Diocese of Tarlac 2. Archdiocese of San Fernando, Pampanga 3. Diocese of Malolos 4. Diocese of Iba, Zambales 5. Diocese of San Jose, Nueva Ecija 6. Diocese of Cabanatuan, Nueva Ecija 7. Diocese of Balanga, Bataan

Southern Luzon Cluster & Bicol Region: 1. Diocese of Lucena 2. Diocese of Gumaca, Quezon 3. Diocese of Legazpi 4. Archdiocese of Caceres, Naga

Visayas Cluster: 1. Diocese of Tagbilaran, Bohol 2. Diocese of Talibon, Bohol 3. Archdiocese of Cebu 4. Diocese of Bacolod 5. Diocese of San Jose, Antique 6. Diocese of Kabankalan, Negros Occidental 7. Archdiocese of Jaro, Iloilo

Mindanao Cluster: 1. Archdiocese of Cagayan de Oro 2. Diocese of Malaybalay, Bukidnon 3. Diocese of Pagadian, Zamboanga del Sur 4. Archdiocese of Davao 5. Diocese of Tandag 6. Diocese of Butuan

National Capital Region Cluster: 1. Archdiocese of Manila 2. Diocese of Cubao 3. Diocese of Antipolo 4. Diocese of Parañaque 5. Diocese of Novaliches 5. Diocese of Caloocan 6. Diocese of Imus 7. Diocese of Pasig

== Affiliations ==
The Student Catholic Action has been affiliated with the following federation and associations:

- AYOM - Archdiocesan Youth Organizations and Movements
- CM - Campus Ministry
- FNYO - Federation of National Youth Organizations
- CODE-M - Coalition for Decency and Morality-Youth
- EASYNet - Ecumenical Asia-Pacific Youth and Students Network (PhilNet)
