= National Union of Students of the Philippines =

Alliance of student councils in the Philippines

- President: Jandeil Roperos
- Founded: 1957
- Colours

The National Union of Students of the Philippines is an alliance of student councils in the Philippines established in 1957. Advocating for democratic rights of students, it boasts about 600 member councils and is part of International Union of Students (IUS) and the Asia Pacific Youth and Students Association (ASA). It is also a member and a founding organization of Kabataan Partylist.

== History ==
=== Early years ===
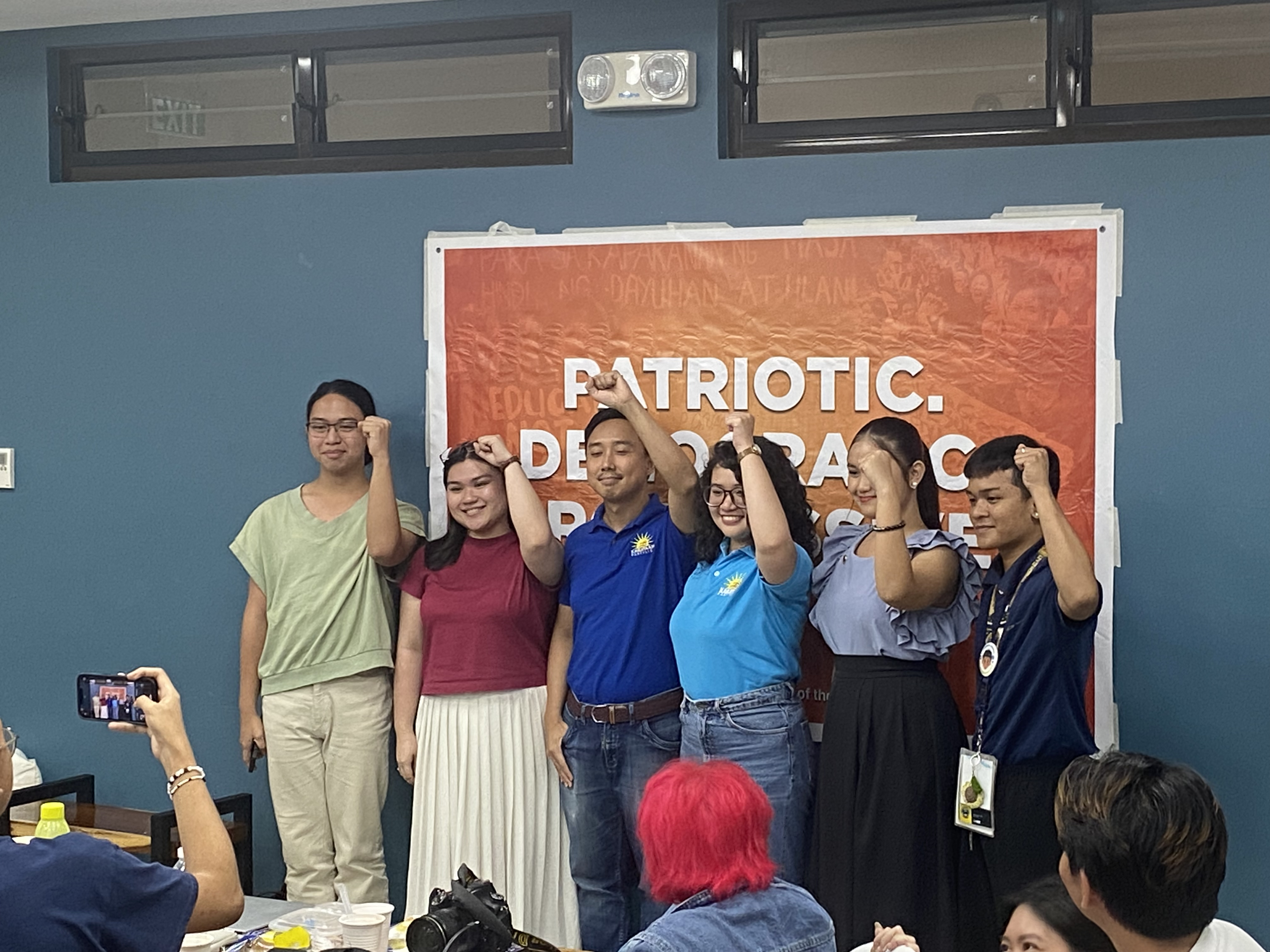
NUSP National Congress, 2025.

The National Union of Students of the Philippines (NUSP) was established in 1957, seceding from Student Council's Association of the Philippines. The group seceded partly because leaders of the former group promised votes for politicians, which affected and silenced students' opinions. Artemio Panganiban became one of the co-founders of NUSP and served as its president from 1958 to 1959.

=== Marcos dictatorship ===
The union has been very active as part of the student movement in the Philippines. Edgar Jopson was elected NUSP president during the 13th annual conference in 1969. After the conference, they led a major mobilization rally in front of the Congress, while then-president Ferdinand Marcos was delivering his State of the Nation Address (SONA). During the joint mobilization of moderates and radicals, about 5 p.m., students threw a coffin and a stuffed alligator at Ferdinand and Imelda Marcos as they left the Congress Building. They also burned an effigy of Marcos. Under Jopson's two-term tenure, the union participated in socio-political issues, especially as part of the First Quarter Storm and the Second Propaganda Movement.

They were concerned with Marcos's Constitutional Convention from 1971 to 1973. NUSP was a moderate group during this time, challenging Marcos not to have another term beyond the two-term limit that was set by the 1935 Philippine Constitution, as compared to Kabataang Makabayan, a more radical youth group that pursued systemic structural changes.

=== Post-EDSA ===
NUSP was also part of the Second People Power Uprising.

During the early administration of President Gloria Macapagal Arroyo, a youth initiative called Youth Movement for Justice and Meaningful Change, composed of Anakbayan, League of Filipino Students, Student Christian Movement of the Philippines, College Editors' Guild of the Philippines, and NUSP met at the office of Anakbayan in Padre Noval, Sampaloc, Manila, to discuss plans to advance the interests of the Filipino youth. Talks were made due to the disillusionment brought by the new administration. Eventually, these talks culminated in the formation of Anak ng Bayan Youth Party (Kabataan Partylist) on June 19, 2001, coinciding with the birthday of José Rizal.

Amid the effects of the COVID-19 pandemic among students in the Philippines, the union advocated for safe resumption of face-to-face classes, for they said that online distance learning has been detrimental to the welfare of the students.

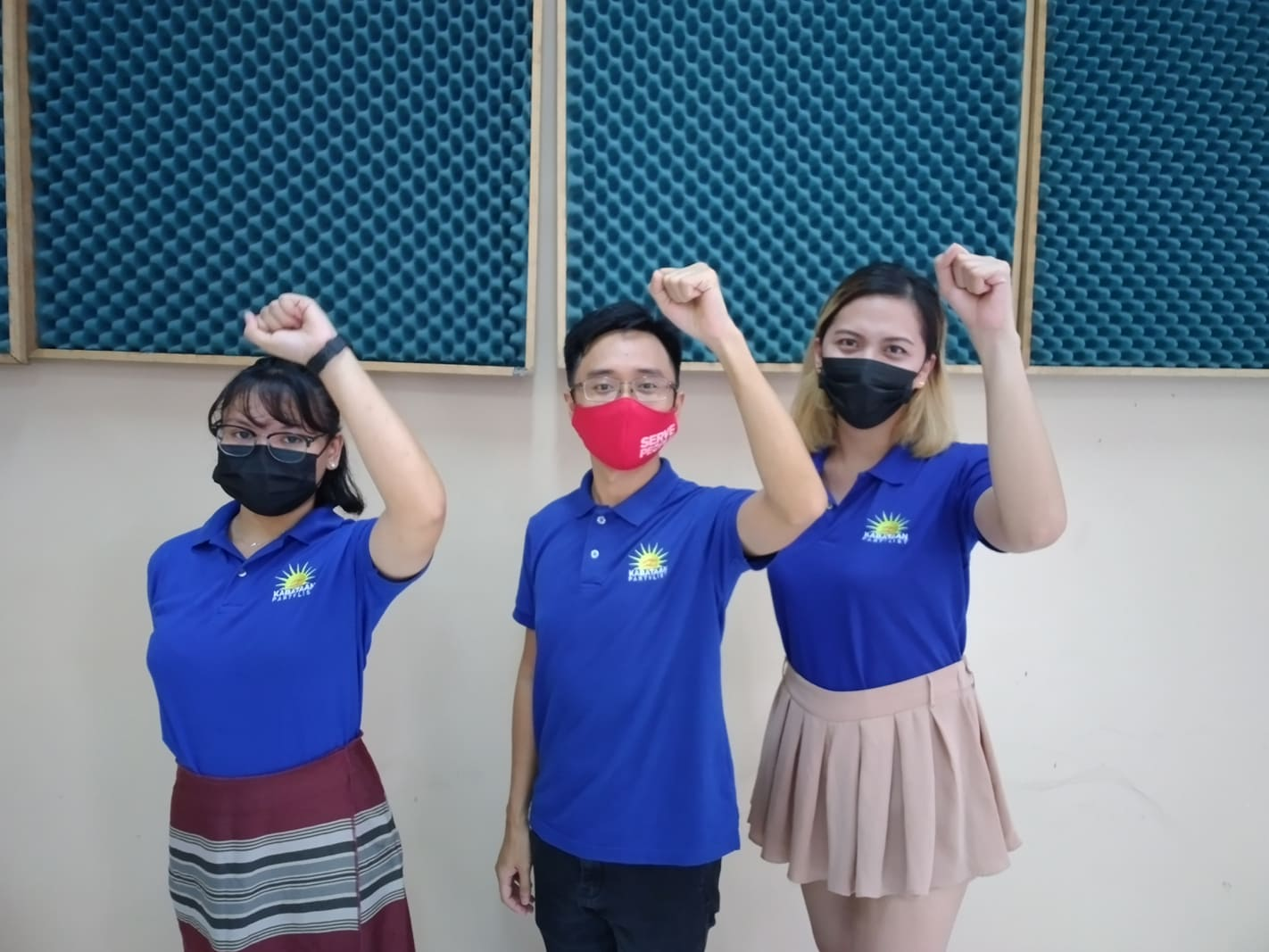
Former NUSP Presidents Raoul Manuel (center) and current President Jandeil Roperos (right) with Angelica Galimba, Kabataan Partylist 2022 second nominee.

The current president of NUSP is Jandeil Roperos, who was also the third nominee of Kabataan Partylist for the 2022 national elections. Kabataan Partylist's first nominee was Raoul Manuel, a former president of the NUSP.

== Notable alumni ==
- Artemio Panganiban
- Edgar Jopson
- John Osmeña
- Raul Roco
- Rene Saguisag
- Sonia Malasarte
- Ricardo Puno Jr.
- Ronaldo Puno
- Salvador Britanico
- Violy Calvo
- Loida Nicolas
- Nely Nicolas
- Macapanton Abbas
- Carlos Padilla
- Miriam Defensor
- Tina Monzon
- Jose Lina
- Francis Pangilinan
- Lean Alejandro
- Chito Gascon
- Lorenzo Tañada III
- Hernani Braganza
- Mike Defensor
- Sarah Elago
- Raoul Manuel
