= Edgar Jopson =

Filipino labour rights activist

- Born: Edgardo Gil Mirasol Jopson; September 1, 1948; Sampaloc, Manila, Philippines
- Died: September 21, 1982 (aged 34); Davao City, Philippines
- Cause of death: Killed during a military raid
- Resting place: Loyola Memorial Park, Marikina, Philippines
- Other name: Edjop
- Education: Ateneo de Manila University (BS); University of the Philippines Diliman (dropped out)
- Occupations: Clerk, activist
- Known for: Political and student activism
- Political party: Communist Party of the Philippines (1973–1982)
- Spouse: Gloria Maria Asuncion (m. 1974)
- Children: 3
- Awards: Ten Outstanding Young Men (1970)

Edgardo Gil Mirasol Jopson (September 1, 1948 – September 21, 1982), more popularly known as Edjop, was a Filipino activist. Although he later became a member of the Communist Party of the Philippines (CPP) during the martial law regime under President Ferdinand Marcos, he was considered a more moderate voice among left-leaning student activists during the First Quarter Storm.

Jopson studied at the Ateneo de Manila High School, and later proceeded to Ateneo de Manila University where he graduated under the Management Engineering program, garnering Latin Honors. He was active in politics since his years in college, serving as president of the National Union of Students of the Philippines (NUSP). During the First Quarter Storm, he and other NUSP members were granted a meeting with President Marcos on January 30, 1970, where he was noted to have demanded from Marcos a written promise not to run for a third term as president.

He later went underground with the CPP when President Marcos declared martial law in 1972. He was killed during a military raid at his house in 1982.

== Early life and education ==
Edgar Jopson was the second eldest among twelve children whose family lived in Sampaloc, Manila. His father opened the Jopson Supermarket in 1953 while his mother helped in the grocery section. In 1955, two years after their business was established, the family moved to Philamlife Homes in Quezon City where they were invited to open a branch in the subdivision. In 1958, the family experienced bankruptcy due to business failures and had to move back to Sampaloc where their first branch was still open. At the time, Edjop and Inday, his older sister, helped out in the store while continuing their schooling.

=== Education ===
Jopson was named the most outstanding pupil of his class in Telly Zulueta Kindergarten in Malate, Manila in 1954. During the awarding ceremony, he got the chance to deliver a speech. A Jesuit priest who attended the ceremony approached Ed's father to encourage him to enroll at the Ateneo Grade School. The nickname Edjop stuck on him when his geometry teacher failed to pronounce "Jopson" in the Spanish pronunciation, giving it a strong "J" sound instead of "H". In high school, Ed had a rigid studying schedule wherein his routine was fixed every night. His parents accommodated him by having a den built especially for him.

Jopson had developed certain "airs" which made him more arrogant because of his stay at the Ateneo. When he was a junior, he asked his father for a car, citing that his friends had cars, to which his father replied, "We are not like them, and I don't like your attitude." He was ordered to take the bus from then on.

Throughout his high school life, he joined several organizations such as the Math Club and the Debating Society, and was active in religious organizations as well, such as the Ateneo Catechetical Instructors League. Thanks to a Jesuit education that encouraged Ateneans to be "men for others", Ed considered going into the priesthood but realized after a retreat that he does not need to enter the seminary to be able to help people. On the other hand, his father offered an anecdote which better explained his change of heart: after a trip to Mindoro, Ed was impressed by untouched land that he saw and urged his father to buy the land, saying that he would rather be a farmer than a priest, which pleased his father. The family bought the land, and built a farm and vacation home there. Ed eventually became a class valedictorian and in his speech, said, "We will not just dream our goal in life without doing anything about it. We shall develop all our talents and gifts to the fullest, in order to serve you, our neighbor, and our country, to the best of our abilities." However, during a trip to Hong Kong, Ed disclosed to his father that he was not comfortable being class valedictorian because of the added weight it carried on his life.

Jopson pursued a degree in Management Engineering at the Ateneo de Manila University. During his stay, he was noted for garnering high grades in subjects such as History and Theology, whereas he was less impressive in Mathematics and the Natural Sciences. He finished the five-year management engineering program in April 1970 in four years. Because of his performance in high school, and having graduated as valedictorian, he became a likely candidate for the class presidency which he won in 1969. Aside from the student council, he was also active in different organizations and started others, such as the Ateneo History Club and AIESEC-Ateneo.

He would later enter the UP College of Law which he would withdraw from two years after, noting that the legal profession was meant only for the rich.

=== Personal life ===
In his sophomore year in college, Jopson met Gloria Maria "Joy" Asuncion, with whom he had a relationship. They got married on January 26, 1974 at a church in Navotas. It was the fourth anniversary of the start of the First Quarter Storm. It was originally intended to be a small event with minimal guests, however 300 people attended. Jopson and Joy bore their first child, Liberato Labrador Celnan in 1975.

Jopson closely followed the dictum of simple living espoused by the underground movement ("UG"). Following his arrest in 1979, he and Joy left their children in the care of his parents. Joy gave birth to their third child, Teresa Lorena in 1982. She was named after both Teresa Magbanua, a heroine of the Philippine Revolution, and Lorena Barros, a UG martyr who died in a military encounter. Following Edgar's death, Joy married Romulo Kintanar, one of their UG comrades.

== Early reformist activism ==
=== Student activism ===
Jopson's political ascent began in college when he was inspired by an article from the Guidon, Ateneo's campus newspaper, in 1968, entitled "Down from the Hill."

Jopson joined various political organizations during his stay. One of those groups was the Laymen's Association for Post Vatican II Reforms (LAPVIIR), a religious group which rallied against graft and corruption. He also ran for the presidency of the National Union of Students of the Philippines (NUSP) in mid-1969, just as Marcos won his second term, a position which became critical because of the impending constitutional convention slated for 1971. In December 1970, he was reelected for a second term.

He was named one of the Ten Outstanding Young Men of 1970 for his "community service through student activism". Though this may be the case, Salanga noted Jopson's lack of real joy from winning the award as he was recognized as the leader of a group divided. He only accepted the award as a strategic political move so as to reorient the NUSP and regain the popularity it once had, which made the radical groups hate him even more.

=== First Quarter Storm ===
During former President Marcos' State of the Nation Address on January 26, 1970, NUSP and other moderate groups organized a demonstration wherein students from different assembly points would converge in front of the Philippine Congress, calling for a non-partisan Constitutional Convention. An hour after the program outside Congress began, radical groups arrived and cut through the group, positioning themselves at the very front of the mass. Things began to get out of hand and, in an attempt to control the crowd and protect the students by ending the program early, Jopson took to the stage to seize the microphones to prevent one of the radical leaders, Gary Olivar, from delivering his speech. The radicals saw this as a hostile attempt of Jopson claiming authority over the groups and lambasted him for it. President Marcos came out of Congress as students were burning an effigy of him; this coincided some students throwing a cardboard coffin and crocodile at him. At this point, Jopson attempted to disperse the 50,000 students in attendance but the Metrocoms began attacking everyone on site. The students fought back, throwing bottles and stones at them. Jopson and his peers fled, attempting to aid as many students as they can while going into hiding.

After the events of January 26, Jopson was under fire for implying the violence to not be the fault of NUSP but of the radicals and the police alone, thereby detaching NUSP completely from the radical groups. Ed came to realize this and in an article for The Manila Times on February 7, 1970 said that he calls on all youth and student groups to unite as one after the incident which failed to do so.

==== Aftermath and the Battle of Mendiola ====
The president agreed to dialogue with the moderate group on January 30. On the date, Jopson was close to leaving when the president arrived almost an hour and a half late. As Ed was voicing out to Marcos the demands of the 26th demonstration along with Portia Ilagan, the then head of the National Student's League, students began to assemble outside Malacañang Palace. NUSP, NSL, and other moderate groups took their positions in Freedom Park whereas radical groups began mobilizing to Malacañang at around 5 p.m. from a rally they held in front of Congress. Tension grew as rocks were being thrown from the outside, and subsequently, were thrown from the palace to the crowd, leading to the Palace guards attacking those in the rallies. While this was happening, the discussion inside was about to arrive at a resolution for the demand of a non-partisan constitutional convention, when Jopson made a last demand wanting assurance that the president will not seek a third term. Marcos replied "I am constitutionally bound to not run for a third term," but Ed remained steadfast and demanded the president sign a document pledging to not run for a third term. This irked Marcos to which he answered "Who are you to tell me what to do! You're only a son of a grocer!" Ilagan acted quickly to ease the tension between the two. As the dialogue was to resume, the president was informed of the on-goings outside which abruptly ended the meeting. As the group went out through the front of Malacañang, they saw the ensuing fight and rushed back in the palace to which they were shown the back door to ferry through the river and safely arrive home. The fight continued and got worse, causing much havoc. The fight came to be known as the Battle of Mendiola.

=== Participation in the constitutional convention ===
At the onset of the constitutional convention, NUSP, under Jopson's presidency, joined the Citizens' National Electoral Assembly (CNEA), setting up poll-watching teams and participating in forums regarding the convention.

In 1971, the convention became mired in controversy due to the implications of certain provisions which would allow Marcos a third term, and fraud and violence which laced the campaign. Jopson and the other members of NUSP formed Buklod Kalayaan, Freedom Organization so as to serve as the youth arm of the reformist political movement. Buklod, starting as a youth arm, was to transition into a political party in the future.

=== Visit to China and doubts about reformism ===
By 1971, NUSP had begun to align more with radical groups, and started echoing, more, the sentiments of National Democratic groups. This was further reinforced by a goodwill tour to China which Jopson and other delegates from NUSP had in 1972. The socialist movement in China fascinated Jopson, furthermore because the delegation was unable to see the brutal upheaval occurring during the Chinese Cultural Revolution. Upon his return from China, he had begun to veer away from reformism and hope from the Constitution Convention, going so far as to say to his fellows in NUSP that perhaps they were wrong in upholding a moderate stance.

=== Martial law declared ===
On September 21, 1972, several months after his visit to China, President Ferdinand Marcos declared Martial Law. On the evening of September 22, Jopson's sisters climbed up their roof to serve as lookouts for any possibility of military raids though they knew he was not on the government’s list at the time.

== Radical activism ==
=== Deciding to join the Communist Party ===
Though several career options were presented to Jopson, he chose to work as a low-level clerk in a prominent labor federation (PAFLU) in Tondo. He also turned down several offers from international groups such as the United Nations.

Rigoberto Tiglao, a member of Kabataang Makabayan, one of the radical groups present during the First Quarter Storm, contacted him after hearing news of his participation in PAFLU after leaving NUSP. During a meeting between the two, Jopson disclosed his interest in joining the Communist Party without Tiglao's membership in the party, to which Tiglao responds that he may know someone who can help him. Jopson's application into the party was a complicated one because of his prominence as a leader in the moderate movement. Though he was welcomed by some members, many remained apprehensive because of his stature as an institution of reformism in the country, with others going so far as to say that his application was merely a ploy to infiltrate the party to retrieve information. Tiglao personally handled his application, and after several meetings with Tiglao and other members, he was accepted.

=== Going underground ===
On December 31, 1973, the military raided the Buklod Kalayaan headquarters, capturing several of his colleagues in the groups. This led to him going underground.

The capture of Joma Sison in 1977 led to the disbursement of responsibility over the party to the second-tier leaders, one of which was Ed. His status in the party had been elevated to that of member of the Central Committee which was in charge of the party's contingent in Manila and Rizal. Over an infraction of the Manila and Rizal UG organization of the orders from the national party leadership, Filemon Lagman was relieved of his position as the head of Manila, and his position was passed on to Ed. Though Ed assumed the position, members were unwilling to cooperate with him as he was on Lagman's side in not following the orders of the national leadership, yet did not take his side when he was relieved from office.

In January 1979, the party convened in Nueva Ecija to discuss issues on party leadership, specifically of the Manila contingent as Lagman and allies still contested Ed's appointment. The meetings lasted over a month until February when it was decided that Lagman would be reassigned to a countryside unit.

=== Arrest and escape ===
On June 13, 1979, Jopson was captured at his house in Las Piñas. He was brought to Camp Crame and tortured together with his comrades who were in the house the night it was raided by the military. Throughout his arrest, he would ask money from his father, who would visit often, to bribe several agents so as to get their favor.

He bargained with Rodolfo Aguinaldo, a rebel-hunter for Marcos, to be an informant of the UG and to dismantle the movement from within. Aguinaldo was an intelligence officer competing with other members of the military, including the guards assigned to watch and interrogate Jopson. Aguinaldo saw him as a way to get more information on other UG groups so as to ensure himself bigger payoffs. On June 24, Jopson was brought to Aguinaldo's safe house, which was near his house. Since he was familiar with the area, he was able to maneuver past the guards and escape from Aguinaldo and his men, after which he went into hiding for a few weeks. Some time in early July, Jopson fled to Samal with Isagani Serrano.

In Samal, Jopson hid as Gusting and lived among the farmers. Two months later, he left for Pampanga to attend a meeting with Party leaders regarding his next assignment.

=== Return to the underground ===
In November 1979, Jopson left for Mindanao where he was assigned to study life on the island so as to better understand how the UG can operate more efficiently on the island after failing to do so years prior. What came out of it was a 200-page document that chronicled every possible facet of life in Mindanao from its terrain to its history, even including companies and kingpins that dominated the island.

Jopson returned to Luzon in July 1980 to attend the 8th plenum of the Party's Central Committee in Bicol, which lasted three months. They discussed the plans of the UG now that they have gotten stronger across the country eight years after the proclamation of martial law. Afterwards Jopson returned to Mindanao together with his cadres. This time, he lived with the guerrillas and participated in their training. The arrangements underscored Jopson’s distinct placement in the Mindanao Party leadership as he was the only one with no military background.

Jopson returned to Manila in June 1981, but decided to come back soon after by November because of a raid in Mindanao that killed Magtanggol Roque and led to the capture of Benjamin de Vera, two top party leaders. Ed decided to extend his stay in Mindanao a few weeks past his arranged departure (in December) to aid a cadre with personal problems she was facing.

== Death ==
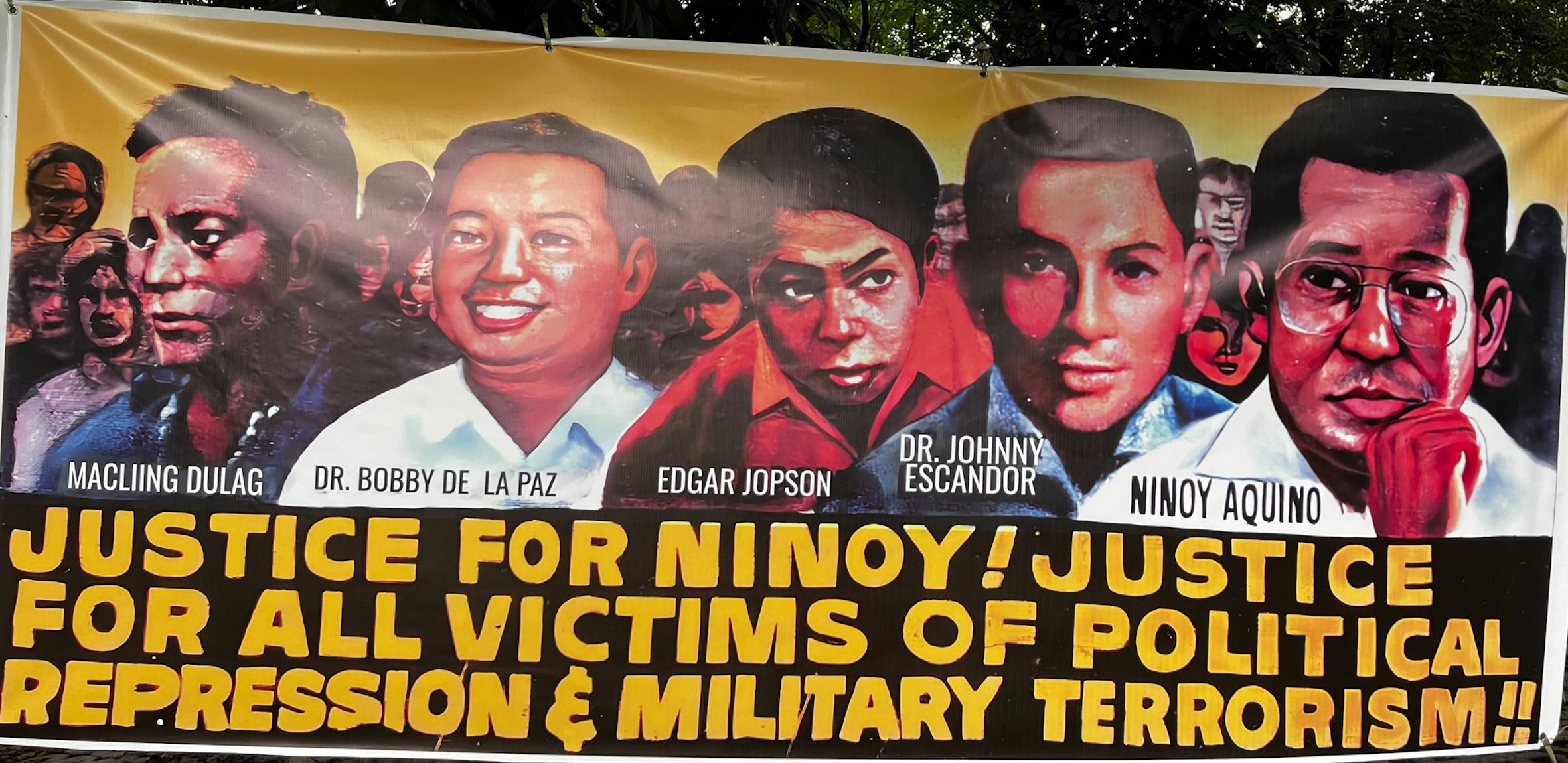
2022 replica of the original 1984 poster created by the group Justice for Aquino, Justice for All (JAJA), showing prominent victims of military violence during the Marcos dictatorship. From left to right: Macli-ing Dulag, Remberto "Bobby" dela Paz, Jopson, Juan "Johnny" Escandor, and Benigno "Ninoy" Aquino Jr. All five individuals were among the first to be honored at the Wall of Remembrance of the Bantayog ng mga Bayani.

In the afternoon of September 19, Ed held a meeting along with Rey Gonzales and Pagging Santos-Gonzales in their UG house. Afterward, Ed left with Teddy, his bodyguard, to visit Dr. Gil Evora, a colleague of his, in another village. During the meeting, Major Nelson Estares and his men, under orders of the military government, were waiting in Ed's village. Ed and Teddy left Evora's house a little past 9 p.m. Estares mobilized his team as soon as they spotted Ed and Teddy's motorcycle enter the UG house. Estares, wanting Ed alive, commanded part of his team to barge in through the front and the other to position themselves at a lot near the back of their compound so as to leave Ed and the other cadres no chance of escape. As the first team was moving in, one of the soldiers climbing the fence got stuck, his gun hitting the fence noisily. Ed quickly looked out and saw men with white headbands on and started shouting that the soldiers were here. He ran to the backdoor with the other cadres – they were to climb a wall at the back of the compound where there was an empty lot on the other side. Teddy climbed the wall first and was quick to jump to the other side. Ed climbed the wall after him but hesitated as he reached the top, not jumping immediately after reaching it. He was shot as he was on top of the wall.

== Legacy ==
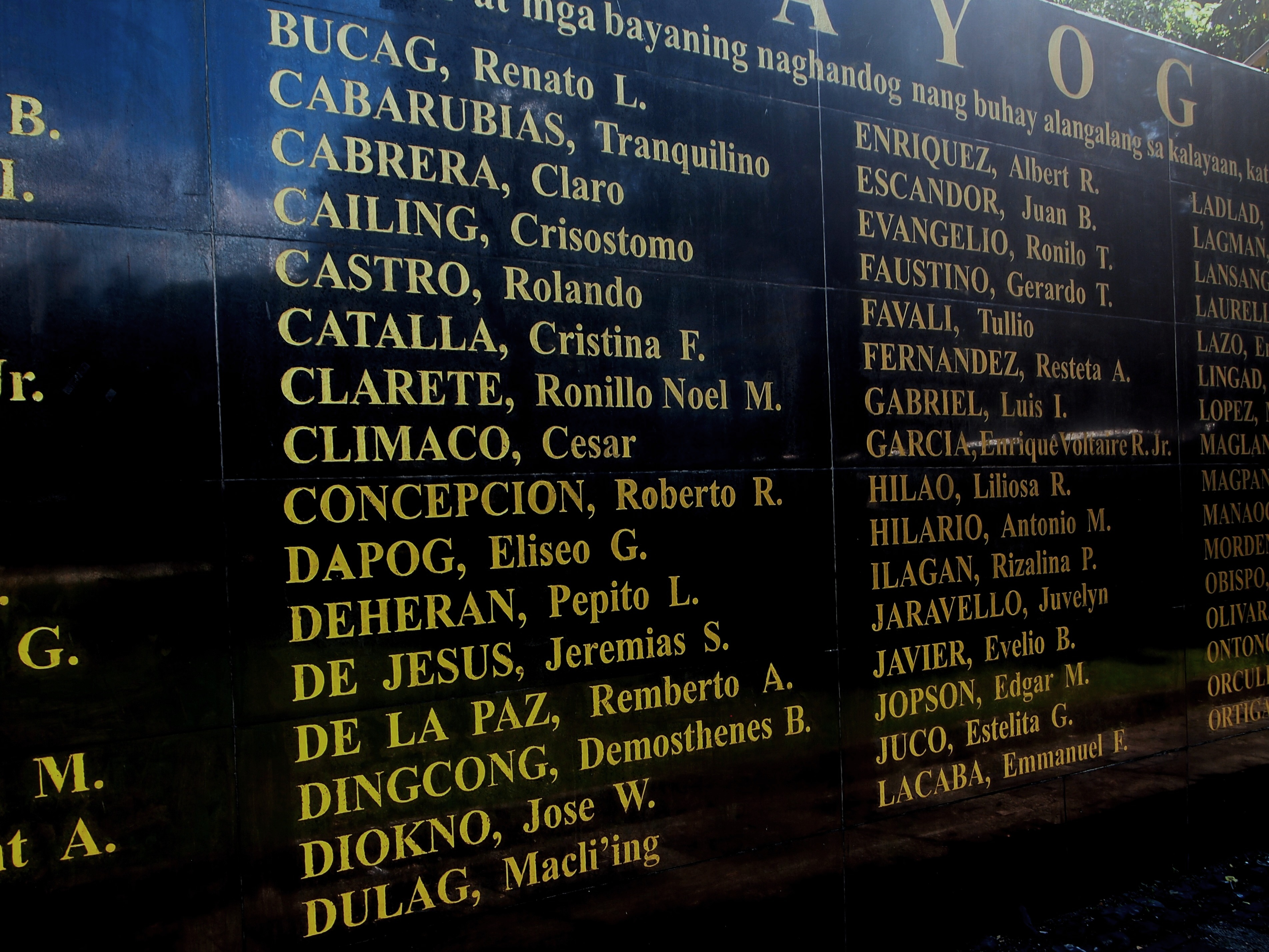
Detail of the Wall of Remembrance at the Bantayog ng mga Bayani, showing names from the first batch of Bantayog honorees, including that of Edgar Jopson.

Jopson's name is included among those listed on the memorial wall of the Bantayog ng mga Bayani, a museum dedicated to commemorating the martial law martyrs.

His story was featured in Living and Dying: In Memory of 11 Ateneo de Manila Martial Law Activists (2007) and Six Young Filipino Martyrs (1997). In 1989, a full-length biography of Edjop was written by Benjamin Pimentel Jr. titled Edjop: The Unusual Journey of Edgar Jopson. It includes details about Edjop's personal life, background, and journey through activism. It was published internationally in 1991 as Rebolusyon!: A Generation of Struggle in the Philippines. It was updated by Pimentel in 2006, retitled U.G.: An Underground Tale: The Journey of Edgar Jopson and the First Quarter Storm Generation, and again in 2019 with a new subtitle The Life and Struggle of Edgar Jopson.

A biopic of Jopson's life, titled Edjop, was released on September 16, 2026. He was portrayed by Elijah Canlas in the film.
