= Edgar Ang Sinco =

Filipino anti-martial law activist

- Born: Edgar Catacutan Ang Sinco; January 2, 1952; Sto. Niño, San Fernando, Pampanga, Philippines
- Died: February 16, 1971 (aged 19); Davao City, Philippines
- Cause of death: Assassination
- Education: University of the East; University of Mindanao

Edgar Catacutan Ang Sinco (January 2, 1952 - February 16, 1971) was a student activist from the University of Mindanao (UM) in Davao City who was active in the years immediately prior to Ferdinand Marcos' declaration of Martial Law. He was shot down while giving a speech in front of the university' Main building on February 16, 1971 – one of several students gunned down during the events of the First Quarter Storm, but the first from the city of Davao. As such, he is considered Davao City's first martyr in the struggle against the Marcos dictatorship.

Ang Sinco's assassination came after three months during which the students of UM had been on strike. With tensions already running high, Ang Sinco's assassination triggered three days and three nights of riots in Davao's CM and Recto and Oyanguren streets, in what has come to be referred to as the "Battle of C.M. Recto."

On November 30, 2018, Ang Sinco's name was engraved on the Wall of Remembrance of the Bantayog ng mga Bayani, which honors the martyrs and heroes that fought against the Martial Law regime of Ferdinand Marcos.
