= Armando Malay =

Filipino journalist (1914–2003)

Armando J. Malay
- Born: Armando de Jesus Malay; March 31, 1914; Tondo, Manila, Philippine Islands
- Died: May 15, 2003 (aged 89); Quezon City, Philippines
- Education: University of the Philippines Manila (BA)
- Occupations: Journalist; author
- Spouse: Paula Carolina Santos

Armando de Jesus Malay (March 31, 1914 – May 15, 2003) was a Filipino journalist, scholar, and activist during the presidency of Ferdinand Marcos. After graduating, he became a reporter for the Tribune. After the Second World war, he put up the Manila Chronicle with former staff members of the Tribune.

== Early life and education ==
Malay was born on March 31, 1914, in Tondo, Manila, to Gonzalo C. Malay and Carmen de Jesus. He finished his primary and secondary education in Gagalangin Elementary School and Torres High School in Manila. He graduated with a degree in journalism at the University of the Philippines, where he became editor-in-chief of the Philippine Collegian and was a member of the Upsilon Sigma Phi.

== Career ==
=== Journalism ===
After graduating, he became a reporter for the Tribune. After the Second World War, he put up the Manila Chronicle with former staff members of the Tribune. The newspaper was later acquired by the Lopez family and started to promote the political career of Fernando Lopez, at which point Armando left the paper.

After Chronicle, he took the editorship of the post‑war Daily Mail. His columns also appeared in the Star Reporter, Evening Chronicle, Weekly Women's Magazine, the pre-martial law Malaya, Philippine Review, Manila Times, and many others. He stayed at the Times newsdesk for 16 years, and retired in 1966.

=== Academe ===
For over two decades, Malay taught English, journalism, and Rizal courses at the University of the Philippines and Far Eastern University. In April 1970, he was appointed Dean of Student Affairs, and he was known simply as Dean Malay. Among his students were Jose Ma. Sison, founder of the Communist Party of the Philippines.

== Martial law years ==
Malay was Dean of Student Affairs during the Diliman Commune. He left the university in 1978 and returned to journalism to write for the alternative press. Malay began writing for Who, Jose Burgos Jr.’s pioneer independent political magazine under martial law. In 1981 he joined Burgos at We Forum, and enjoyed a wide readership for the critical columns he wrote three times a week. In 1982 he was among the writers and staff who were arrested and detained by the military for alleged subversion.

After Ninoy Aquino's assassination, Malay became a staunch activist in the human-rights movement. He was founding chair of Kapatid, a support and advocacy group in behalf of political detainees all over the country. He and his wife Paula were among the many opposition and cause-oriented leaders indefatigably marching at rallies and demonstrations. He also joined the council of leaders of the National Alliance for Justice, Freedom and Democracy. From 1990 to 1992 he was the vice‑chair of Samahan ng mga Ex-Detainees Laban sa Detensyon at Aresto (SELDA), a national organization of former political detainees.

== Personal life and death ==
Malay was married to Paula Carolina Santos and had three children.

Malay died on May 15, 2003, after suffering from a stroke. He was 89. He is survived by children Armando "Buddy" Jr., Carolina "Bobbie" Ocampo, and Ricardo, in-laws, and 17 grandchildren.

== Awards and legacy ==
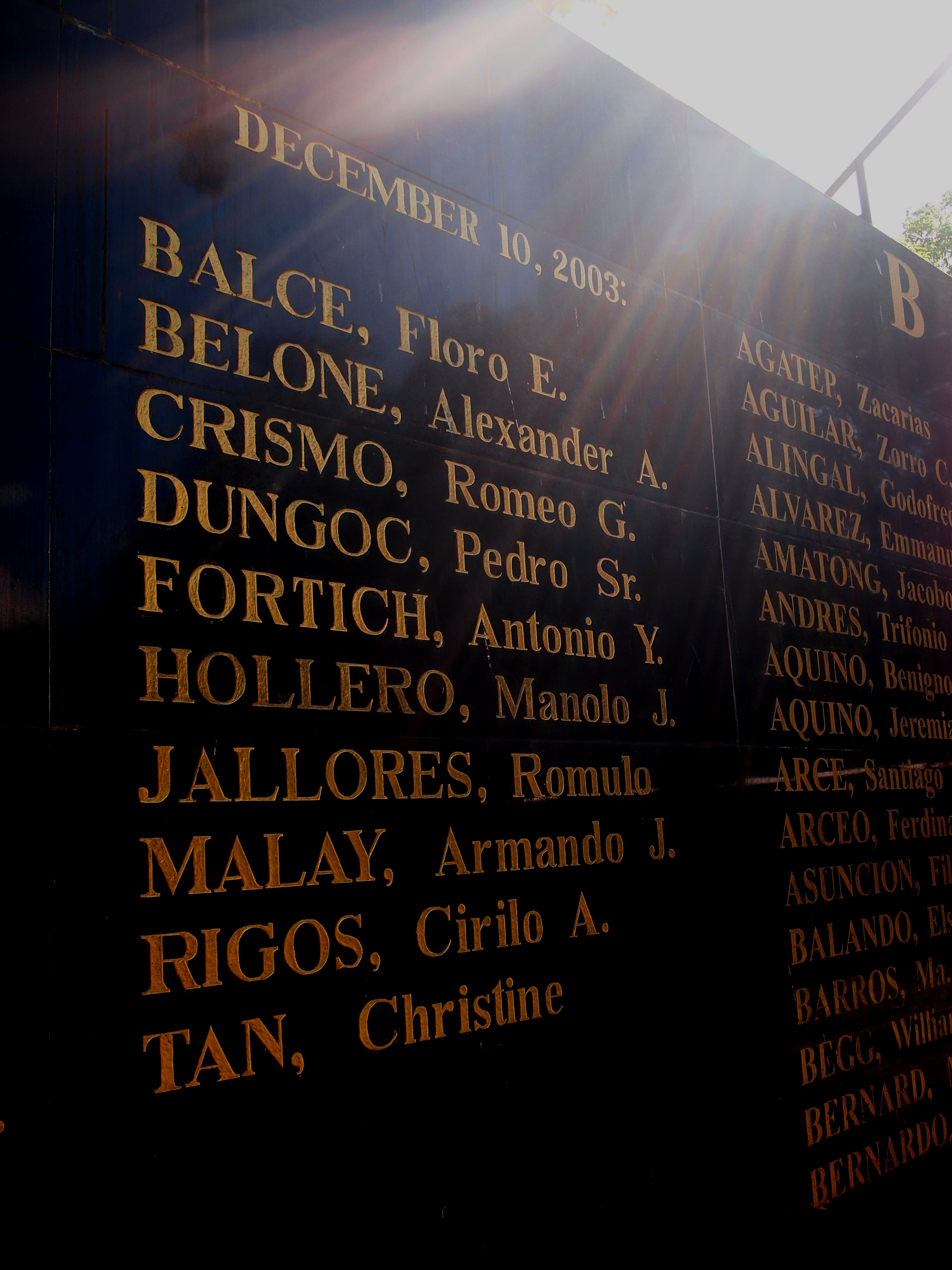
Detail of the Wall of Remembrance at the Bantayog ng mga Bayani, showing names from the 2003 batch of Bantayog Honorees, including that of Armando Malay.

The National Press Club gave Dean Malay a Lifetime Achievement Award in 1990. Four years later, he was named one of the Ten Outstanding Filipinos (TOFIL). He was also one of the recipients of the Metrobank Foundation's first Outstanding Journalists Awards in 2001.

For his contributions to society and the practice of journalism in the Philippines, Malay received such awards as the Gintong Ama; Sampung Ulirang Nakakatanda (Ten Outstanding Senior Citizens); and the Movement for Press Freedom's recognition, Alay sa Aming Gabay, among many others. In recognition of his contribution to the field of journalism, a permanent repository of his works has been established in the UP Archives. Lambino has proposed that the UP journalism department be named after the Dean.

His name is engraved in the Bantayog ng mga Bayani.
