= Diliman Commune =

1971 protest and campus occupation in Quezon City, Philippines

- Part of Student activism in the Philippines (1965–1972)
- Date: February 1–9, 1971
- Location: University of the Philippines Diliman, Quezon City, Philippines; 14.6549°N 121.0645°E
- Caused by: Increase in fuel prices; Jeepney drivers' strike; Police and military operations inside the campus
- Goals: Support for striking transport workers; Rollback of fuel-price increases; Withdrawal of police and military forces; Protection of university autonomy and academic freedom
- Methods: Class boycott; Barricades; Demonstrations; Occupation of university facilities; Radio broadcasts and publications
- Result: Police and constabulary forces withdrew from the campus; Barricades voluntarily dismantled on February 9; Classes resumed

Parties
Protesting UP students, faculty members and campus residents; Kabataang Makabayan; Samahang Demokratiko ng Kabataan; UP Diliman Student Council	Quezon City Police Department; Philippine Constabulary Metropolitan Command

Casualties and losses
Pastor "Sonny" Mesina Jr. killed; Several protesters injured; Numerous arrests	At least five campus security guards injured

The Diliman Commune was a nine-day protest and occupation at the University of the Philippines Diliman (UP Diliman) campus in Quezon City from February 1 to 9, 1971. Students, faculty members and campus residents erected barricades and resisted attempts by police and constabulary forces to enter or clear the campus.

The first barricades were erected in support of striking jeepney drivers who opposed a three-centavo increase in fuel prices. The focus of the protest shifted toward university autonomy and academic freedom after mathematics professor Inocente Campos shot student Pastor "Sonny" Mesina Jr. and police and military forces entered the campus. During the occupation, protesters exercised effective control over much of the campus, operated the university radio station DZUP, used the UP Press and published a newspaper called Bandilang Pula.

The participants called themselves "Communards" and associated the occupation with the Paris Commune of 1871. The campus was referred to as the Malayang Komunidad ng UP Diliman ("Free Community of UP Diliman").

== Background ==
The Diliman Commune occurred during the second presidential term of Ferdinand Marcos, amid inflation, political unrest and the growth of student activism in the Philippines. UP Diliman had become a center of dissent during the late 1960s and the First Quarter Storm of 1970.

Fuel prices were increased from 30 to 33 centavos per liter in early 1971. Jeepney drivers responded with strikes, including one on January 11. Students led by the Kabataang Makabayan (KM) and the Samahang Demokratiko ng Kabataan (SDK) announced their support when the transport strike resumed on February 1.

Historian Joseph Scalice placed the events at Diliman within a broader campaign of barricades organized by radical student groups. Related barricades were established in Manila's University Belt and at the University of the Philippines Los Baños.

== Course of events ==
=== February 1: initial barricades and shooting ===
On the morning of February 1, between 200 and 300 students established the first barricade along University Avenue. Vehicles were directed away from the campus, although faculty members and university employees were allowed to enter on foot. UP president Salvador P. Lopez asked Dean of Students Armando Malay to negotiate with the protesters to allow vehicles through.

Shortly before noon, campus security personnel attempted to remove a tree that had been placed across the road. A confrontation followed in which students threw improvised explosive devices and incendiary bombs. Five security guards were reportedly injured.

Mathematics professor Inocente Campos (Note: UP Diliman's 2021 chronology spells the professor's given name as "Inocentes". The peer-reviewed study by Joseph Scalice and the Bantayog ng mga Bayani profile of Mesina use "Inocente".) attempted to drive through the barricade. After an explosive damaged one of his vehicle's tires, Campos exited the vehicle while armed and fired toward the protesters. Pastor "Sonny" Mesina Jr. was struck in the forehead, while another student, Leo Alto, was wounded in the cheek.

Campus security guards arrested Campos and turned him over to the Quezon City Police Department. Protesters subsequently burned his vehicle. Mesina was brought first to the university infirmary and later to the Veterans Memorial Hospital, where he remained unconscious until his death on February 4.

After the shooting, protesters entered Quezon Hall and confronted Lopez over the university administration's response to the barricades. Police were dispatched to the campus and cleared several barricades, arresting more than 18 students according to Scalice's account. The students rebuilt the barricades after the police withdrew.

=== Police and military incursions ===
On February 2, Quezon City police and members of the Philippine Constabulary Metropolitan Command attempted to enter the campus through University Avenue and Katipunan Road. Police used tear gas and firearms, while protesters responded with stones, pillbox bombs, fireworks and Molotov cocktails.

Clashes occurred near Vinzons Hall, Palma Hall and the Kamia and Sampaguita residence halls. Police entered the vicinity of the women's dormitories while pursuing protesters who had sought refuge there. Students subsequently erected additional barricades around the campus and occupied several buildings.

Following these confrontations, the protest's central issue shifted from support for the transport strike to opposition to police and military intervention inside the university. Lopez objected to the entry of outside security forces and appealed to Quezon City mayor Norberto Amoranto to prevent further incursions.

On February 3, Lopez addressed an assembly outside Palma Hall. He opposed the militarization of the campus and supported the university's institutional autonomy. Students and faculty members reinforced the barricades when police and constabulary units were observed approaching the assembly.

Negotiations were conducted between university representatives and the security forces. Senators Benigno Aquino Jr., Salvador Laurel and Eva Estrada Kalaw visited the campus and called for the withdrawal of government forces. Marcos subsequently informed Lopez that the troops would be withdrawn and that no deadline would be imposed for dismantling the barricades.

=== Self-organization ===
Protesters declared UP Diliman a "liberated area" and created a provisional directorate. UP Student Council chairperson Ericson Baculinao headed the directorate, while members of student organizations, faculty members and campus residents assisted in maintaining the barricades and providing food, medical assistance and security.

The occupiers called themselves "Communards", in reference to the Paris Commune. University facilities and buildings were temporarily assigned names associated with revolutionary and nationalist figures.

Students took control of DZUP and renamed it the Malayang Tinig ng Demokratikong Komunidad ng Diliman ("Free Voice of the Democratic Community of Diliman"). Its broadcasts were relayed beyond the station's normal campus range. Programming included political commentary, news from the barricades, revolutionary music and recordings connected with the Dovie Beams scandal involving Marcos.

On February 4, students entered the UP Press. Malay arranged for regular press employees to assist them in operating the equipment. The first issue of the commune's newspaper, Bandilang Pula ("Red Flag"), was published on February 5.

Food donated to the occupiers was prepared at Kamia Residence Hall and distributed to the barricades. Campus residents also organized patrols, while a limited shuttle service transported people within the occupied campus.

=== End of the occupation ===
Although most police and constabulary forces had withdrawn by February 4, protesters maintained the barricades for several more days. The commune presented eight demands, which included the rollback of fuel prices, guarantees against police or military entry into the campus, justice for Mesina, the prosecution and dismissal of Campos, an investigation of campus security officials and access to DZUP and the UP Press.

By February 8, the number of participants maintaining the barricades had declined. After discussions involving Lopez, Amoranto, police chief Tomas Karingal and representatives of the provisional directorate, the directorate decided to end the occupation.

The main barricades were removed at approximately 8 a.m. on February 9. Classes resumed, and students and maintenance employees cleared the roads. University accounts reported that furniture and other equipment had been damaged or were missing after the occupation.

== Casualties and legal proceedings ==
Pastor "Sonny" Relampagos Mesina Jr. was born on March 14, 1953, in Davao City. A graduate of the Philippine Science High School, he was a first-year UP student and a recent member of the Samahang Demokratiko ng Kabataan. He died in Quezon City on February 4, 1971, three days after he was shot. He was 17 years old.

Mesina's death intensified opposition to the police and military presence at the university. He subsequently became known in UP commemorations as the university's first martyr of the resistance to the Marcos administration.

Danilo "Dangke" Delfin was shot during one of the confrontations near Vinzons Hall. The bullet damaged his lungs and spinal cord, leaving him paralyzed and reliant on a wheelchair. Accounts later differed over the direction from which the shot had been fired. Other students, dormitory residents, campus workers and security personnel were injured during the confrontations, while numerous protesters were arrested.

Campos was charged in connection with Mesina's death but was acquitted in September 1972. The court accepted his claim that he had acted out of fear of injury during the confrontation.

== Historical interpretations ==
Accounts of the Diliman Commune differ over whether it was primarily a spontaneous uprising or part of a planned political campaign. UP commemorative accounts generally describe it as a solidarity protest that developed into a wider defense of academic freedom after Mesina's shooting and the entry of government forces.

In a 2018 study published in Philippine Studies: Historical and Ethnographic Viewpoints, Scalice argued that the barricades were planned and coordinated by the KM and SDK rather than arising spontaneously. He connected them to simultaneous protest activity in the University Belt and UP Los Baños and argued that the barricades were dismantled without the commune's demands having first been granted.

Writer Teo S. Marasigan disputed this interpretation. He agreed that the initial solidarity barricades were planned but distinguished them from the subsequent expansion of the protest after Mesina's shooting and the police incursions. Marasigan characterized the latter development as spontaneous and regarded the withdrawal of government forces and the commune's defense of academic freedom as significant achievements.

== Legacy and commemoration ==
The Diliman Commune became a prominent episode in the history of student activism at UP and in accounts of opposition to the Marcos administration before the declaration of martial law in September 1972. Mesina was among the individuals honored by the Bantayog ng mga Bayani Foundation in 2008.

In 2019, UP Diliman organized a walking tour of locations connected with the commune, including Quezon Hall, Palma Hall, Melchor Hall, Vinzons Hall and the Kamia and Sampaguita residence halls.

UP Diliman commemorated the commune's 50th anniversary in 2021 through lectures, an online historical exhibition and an art installation titled Barikada, created by artist Abdulmari "Toym" de Leon Imao Jr. The installation used bamboo, discarded classroom furniture and other materials to evoke the barricades erected in 1971.

== See also ==
- First Quarter Storm
- UP–Department of National Defense Accord
- Student activism in the Philippines (1965–1972)
- Martial law under Ferdinand Marcos
