= First Quarter Storm =

1970 protests against Philippine President Ferdinand Marcos

First Quarter Storm Sigwa ng Unang Sangkapat (Filipino)
- Part of Opposition to the Marcos Regime
- Date: January—March 1970
- Location: Manila, Quezon City and various parts of Rizal province
- Caused by: Economic inequality; Philippine government support of the American intervention in the Vietnam War
- Goals: remove internal issues in schools (e.g. tuition hikes); address poverty, economic crisis; call for systemic change in the government (non-partisan constitutional convention)
- Methods: demonstrations, protests, and marches by students, labor unions, and civic groups
- Result: Violent dispersal of protesters by government forces; radicalization of opposition; used by Marcos as justification for establishing dictatorship

Parties
Government: Armed Forces; MetroCom	Moderate Opposition: NUSP; NSL; CSM; Various labor organizations; Radical Opposition: PKP; KM; SDK; PKP-1930; MPKP

Lead figures
Ferdinand Marcos; Imelda Marcos; Fernando Lopez; Ernesto S. Mata; Manuel Yan	Ninoy Aquino; Jose W. Diokno; Lorenzo Tañada; Emmanuel Pelaez; Edgar Jopson; Chito Sta. Romana; Portia Ilagan; Benjamin Maynigo Jose Maria Sison; Bonifacio Ilagan; Ruben Torres

The First Quarter Storm (Filipino: Sigwa ng Unang Kuwarto or Sigwa ng Unang Sangkapat), often shortened into the initialism FQS, was a period of civil unrest in the Philippines which took place during the "first quarter of the year 1970". It included a series of demonstrations, protests, and marches against the administration of President Ferdinand Marcos, mostly organized by students and supported by workers, peasants, and members of the urban poor, from January 26 to March 17, 1970. Protesters at these events raised issues related to social problems, authoritarianism, alleged election fraud, and corruption at the hand of Marcos.

Violent dispersals of various FQS protests were among the first watershed events in which large numbers of Filipino students of the 1970s were radicalized against the Marcos administration. Due to these dispersals, many students who had previously held "moderate" positions (i.e., calling for legislative reforms) became convinced that they had no choice but to call for more radical social change.

Similar watershed events would later include the February 1971 Diliman Commune; the August 1971 suspension of the writ of habeas corpus in the wake of the Plaza Miranda bombing; the September 1972 declaration of Martial Law; the 1980 murder of Macli-ing Dulag; the August 1983 assassination of Ninoy Aquino; and eventually, allegations of cheating during the 1986 Snap Elections which led to the non-violent 1986 EDSA Revolution.

== Sociopolitical context ==
Ferdinand Marcos was re-elected for a second term as president on November 11, 1969. This made him the first and last Filipino president of the Third Philippine Republic to win a second full term.

=== Inflation and social unrest ===
Marcos won the November 1969 election by a landslide, and was inaugurated on December 30 of that year. But Marcos's massive spending during the 1969 presidential campaign had taken its toll and triggered growing public unrest. During the campaign, Marcos spent $50 million worth in debt-funded infrastructure, triggering a balance of payments crisis. The Marcos administration ran to the International Monetary Fund (IMF) for help, and the IMF offered a debt restructuring deal. New policies, including a greater emphasis on exports and the relaxation of controls of the peso, were put in place. The Peso was allowed to float to a lower market value, resulting in drastic inflation, and social unrest.

Marcos's spending during the campaign led to opposition figures such as Senator Lorenzo Tañada, Senator Jovito Salonga, and Senator Jose W. Diokno to accuse Marcos of wanting to stay in power even beyond the two term maximum set for the presidency by the 1935 constitution.

The nation was experiencing a crisis as the government was falling into debt, inflation was uncontrolled and the value of the peso continued to drop. The slight increase of the minimum wage was countered by continuous price increases and unemployment. Benigno "Ninoy" Aquino Jr. remarked that the nation was turning into a 'garrison state' and President Marcos himself described the country as a 'social volcano.'

=== Constitutional Convention ===
Various parties had begun campaigning to initiate a constitutional convention that would change the 1935 Constitution of the Philippines in 1967, citing rising discontent over wide inequalities in society. On March 16 of that year, the Philippine Congress constituted itself into a Constituent Assembly and passed Resolution No. 2, which called for a Constitutional Convention to change the 1935 Constitution.

Marcos would eventually surprised his critics by endorsing the move, but later historians would note that the resulting Constitutional Convention laid the foundation for the legal justifications Marcos used to extend his term past the two four-year terms allowable under the 1935 Constitution.

The first First Quarter Storm rally held on January 26, 1970, coincided with the State of the Nation Address where Marcos was expected to talk about the 1971 Constitutional Convention.

=== "Moderate" and "radical" opposition ===
The media reports of the time classified the various civil society groups opposing Marcos into two categories. The "Moderates", which included church groups, civil libertarians, and nationalist politicians, were those who wanted to create change through political reforms. The "radicals", including a number of labor and student groups associated with the National Democracy movement, wanted broader, more systemic political reforms.

==== The "moderate" opposition ====
With the Constitutional Convention occupying their attention from 1971 to 1973, statesmen and politicians opposed to the increasingly more-authoritarian administration of Ferdinand Marcos mostly focused their efforts on political efforts from within the halls of power.

Student demonstrators, for example, made a manifesto for the constitutional convention, containing the following provisions:

- the non-partisan election of delegates to the national convention
- the non-partisan composition of poll inspectors and provincial board of canvassers
- public officials who will run as candidates should be made to resign or forfeit their seats upon filing of candidacy
- the Commission on Elections (COMELEC) must regulate the election propaganda and expense of the candidates
- the delegates to the convention must be made ineligible to run for any public office in the elections immediately after the convention
- the age requirement of delegates should be lowered from 25 to 21 years old.

Student groups considered "moderate" at the time included:

- the National Union of Students of the Philippines (NUSP),
- the National Students League (NSL), and
- the Young Christian Socialists Movement (CSM), communitarian-socialist organization.

A few days before the rally on January 26, Manuel F. Martinez, former Dawn (the weekly student newspaper of the University of the East) editor commented:

Now is the time for all troublemakers to come to the aid of the country. For the only chance for exploiters to triumph is for revolutionaries to do nothing [...] We must make trouble in the constitutional convention, trouble for vested interest, trouble for the profligate rich, trouble for the denizens of this detestable establishment and abominable status quo [...] The convention must be scuttled or wrecked if it is dominated by the very same interests against which stands the very spirit of change inherent in convening a constitutional convention. For conceived in greed, born in mischief and nurtured in iniquity, the spirit of wanton capitalism has never failed to bend human institutions to the service of injustice and sin.

To clarify, he explained that the word 'trouble' was used not in its literal sense, but rather that the youth should get involved in the coming convention, which they have been striving to do.

Later "moderate" groups would include the Movement of Concerned Citizens for Civil Liberties or MCCCL, led by Senator Jose W. Diokno. The MCCCL's rallies are particularly remembered for their diversity, attracting participants from both the moderate and radical camps; and for their scale, with the biggest one attended by as many as 50,000 people.

==== The "radical" opposition ====
The other broad category of student groups who participated in the first quarter storm were those who wanted broader, more systemic political reforms, usually as part of the National Democracy movement. These groups were branded "radicals" by the media, although the Marcos administration extended that term to "moderate" protest groups as well.

Groups considered "radical" at the time included:

- the Kabataang Makabayan (KM),
- the Samahang Demokratiko ng Kabataan (SDK),
- the Student Cultural Association of the University of the Philippines (SCAUP),
- the Movement for Democratic Philippines (MDP),
- the Student Power Assembly of the Philippines (SPAP), and
- the Malayang Pagkakaisa ng Kabataang Pilipino (MPKP).

===== Kabataang Makabayan =====
Kabataang Makabayan (KM) is a political organization founded by Jose Maria Sison on November 30, 1964, intended to be a nationwide "extension" of the Student Cultural Association of the University of the Philippines (SCAUP), which is also an organization of student activists founded by Sison in 1959 that moved towards "academic freedom in the University against the combined machinations of the state and the church." The KM advocated for liberation from American imperialism, which "made the suffering of [the] people more complex and more severe." Their first demonstration, which took place at the U.S. Embassy on January 25, 1965, was held to this effect. The KM had since been active in various rallies and demonstrations such as those condemning the Laurel-Langley agreement, Parity Amendments, Mutual Defense treaty, the state visit of South Vietnam Premier Cao Ky in 1966, the state visit of President Marcos to the U.S., the October 24, 1966, Manila Summit conference, the killings of Filipinos in American bases, and the visit of President Nixon—events which they believe contribute to the feudalistic nature of the country.

The rally held against the Manila Summit Conference on October 24 to 25, 1966, was among those that ended in violence. The media and government officials reminded the public to be polite to the country's visitors and display 'traditional Filipino hospitality,' expecting the KM to stage a demonstration. Furthermore, the Manila mayor's office announced that permits to demonstrate against the Manila Summit will not be issued. On the day before the beginning of the summit, as summiteers began to arrive, a group of students waved around name-calling placards, defending that they were not demonstrating, just picketing. They were taken by police and informed that they would be charged with demonstrating without a permit. On October 24, KM held a demonstration in front of Manila Hotel to protest against American involvement in Vietnam which resulted in a violent dispersal. One student had died, several were injured, and seven were arrested, charged with breach of the peace.

December of the same year, Sison was in Ateneo de Manila University to talk about the events of the October 24 movement. Sison highlighted the parallels between the state at current time and the state during the 1896 Philippine Revolution against Spain:

If the brilliant students - Dr. Jose Rizal, Emilio Jacinto and Gregorio del Pilar - had merely concentrated on stale academic studies, and pursued successful professional careers and married well - in the accomplished style of Señor Pasta in El Filibusterismo - they would be worthless now to this nation, as worthless [...]. Our elders who take pride on their sheer age and their sense of caution should learn from the [...] revolutionary and nationalist youth movement of 1896 and of today. The elders [...] should not now assume the function of censors and the black judges who condemned [...] patriots of the old democratic revolution as subversive heretics.

In general, during 1968, there have been many local student demonstrations trying to address internal issues, "ranging from stinking toilets to increased tuition fees." "At the Araneta University, for example, according to Cesar Bercades, president of its student council, the demonstrations there resulted in the damage of school property amounting to P56,920.34 and the dismissal of eight students from the university and all schools."

== Major demonstrations ==
While the period from January to March 1970 was one of significant social unrest in the Philippines and there is no definitive record of all protests or demonstrations in the country, seven protests in the area of Metropolitan Manila have come to be considered the historically notable demonstrations of the time, even being branded the "7 deadly protests of the First Quarter Storm" in some media accounts.

=== January 26: 1970 State of the Nation Address protest ===
January 26, 1970 - Protesters crowd Marcos and company as they enter his limousine. From Manila Bulletin.

The beginning of what is now known as the "First Quarter Storm" was marked by a demonstration on January 26, 1970, at the opening of the Seventh Congress, during which President Ferdinand Marcos gave his fifth State of the Nation Address (SONA).

The protest was primarily organized by the National Union of Students of the Philippines (NUSP), and was meant to coincide with the first State of the Nation Address of Marcos' second term. It included "moderate" groups such as the NUSP, who wanted Marcos to promise he would not seek power beyond the two terms allowed him by the 1935 Philippine Constitution; and more "radical" groups such as the Kabataang Makabayan, who wanted greater systemic political reforms.

The protest was largely peaceful until the end of the planned program, when a disagreement broke out between the moderate and the radical groups for control over the protest stage. This disagreement was ongoing when Marcos, having finished his speech, walked out of the legislative building. He and the First Lady Imelda Marcos were greeted by an agitated crowd that jeered and hurled at them with pebbles, paper balls, and effigies, one resembling a crocodile (a representation of greed) and another a coffin (symbolizing the death of democracy).

The two escaped to the presidential limousine, leaving the police - consisting of the Manila Police District (MPD) and elements of the Philippine Constabulary Metropolitan Command (MetroCom) - to disperse the crowd. This led to hours of bloody confrontation between the protesters and the police, ending with at least two students confirmed dead and several more injured.

=== January 30: Battle of Mendiola ===
Four days after the SONA, to condemn "state fascism" and police brutality, protesters, mostly students, marched back to the Congress. The rally lasted until 5pm. As one of the leaders was saying the closing remarks with a microphone, shouts of "Malacañang! Malacañang!" were heard mainly from the side of the students from Philippine College of Commerce, University of the Philippines Diliman, and University of the Philippines Manila. This led to many people getting pushed by a wave of protesters as they sang protest songs and chanted "Makibaka, huwag matakot!" They began to move towards Ayala Bridge, with the Philippine flag raised, and decided to march directly to Malacañang and protest in front of Marcos' doorsteps, hearing gunfire as they slowly closed by the Palace. Some of the more militant rallyists were charging the metal fence that separates them from the Palace.

While this was happening, different student leaders were already in Malacañang having a meeting with Ferdinand Marcos to make the following demands: "the holding of a nonpartisan constitutional convention; the commitment that Marcos, a two-term president, would not suddenly change the rules forbidding a president from seeking a third term; the resignation of the Manila Police District top brass; and the disbandment of paramilitary units in Central Luzon." Since half past three in the afternoon, Portia Ilagan of Philippine Normal College, Edgar Jopson, other student leaders, and other members of the NUSP were allowed to be present in an audience with Marcos to urge the president to have a nonpartisan constitutional convention and to avoid running for the presidency for the third time.

Marcos said that he was not interested in a third term and Jopson demanded that he put that down in writing, which led to Marcos lash out at him by calling him as merely the son of a grocer. The President did not agree to their terms and their meeting ended at around 6pm. As they headed to the front door of Malacañang Palace, they heard the sounds of glass breaking and pillboxes exploding. As the students' dialogue with the president was happening inside the Palace, the students outside the Palace were confronted with their own difficulties. Due to a loud call from someone outside the Palace to turn the lights on, the Palace did just that to accommodate the request, which led to a rock crashing to one of the lamps. Thinking that this was a rock thrown from inside the Palace and aimed at the students outside, the students threw rocks at the Palace in return.

Protesters claimed that Malacañang guards started the violence by throwing pellets at them from inside, which led them to take over a fire truck (driven by Tony Tayco, now a priest of the Philippine Independent Church.) and smashed it into Malacañang's Gate 4. Once the gate broke and gave way, bold protestors charged into the Palace grounds tossing rocks, pillboxes, Molotov cocktails (using a San Miguel Pale Pilsen beer bottle). The Presidential Guard Battalion then came out in full force with their guns. The protestors drew back but not before inflaming the fire truck and a government car.

January 30, 1970 - Demonstrators ramming a fire truck into Malacanang Gate 4

Protesters ran towards Arguelles Street to evade the explosions in front of the Palace. Student protesters were steadily driven out of J.P. Laurel and farther down Mendiola, where they built a barricade to stop the riot police and armed soldiers from the Palace. As students from nearby dormitories joined them, protesters grew in numbers. Everything was improvised and they did not have any organized plan. The protestors fought the armed forces and defended themselves with sticks and pillboxes. Eventually, the troops succeeded in separating the protestors, putting an end to the rally. Many were severely injured, and since police forces retaliated with live bullets, it led to bloodshed. Bullets were shot at the protesters, killing four students: Ricardo Alcantara of the University of the Philippines, Fernando Catabay of Manuel L. Quezon University, Feliciano Roldan of Far Eastern University, and Bernardo Tausa of Mapa High School. The armed forces were claimed to attack unarmed students. It was a seesaw battle between the youth and the military. Students and military alternatively held Mendiola Bridge, until nine o'clock in the evening, when finally it finally fell to the military. While troops were able to disperse the militants, they failed to clear the streets of M. Aguila, Legarda, and Claro M. Recto and in Quiapo from other rallyists. Doors were opened to these rallyists, and through gestures from people at second-floor windows, they were warned about the presence of armed forces in the streets.

Reactions in the international media were mixed: Singapore's Eastern Sun wrote that Marcos was right for "taking the hard line" in dealing with the demonstrators while an independent Chinese newspaper in Hong Kong thought otherwise. Both publications believed that the charge regarding the involvement of Chinese communists in the violence was exaggerated.

Marcos saw the January 30 protest and siege in Malacañang not only as a personal assault but also as an assault to the presidency itself. He thought of the protests as an insurrection, and only a part of a plot to overthrow the government by force.

Juan Ponce Enrile, who was then Secretary of Justice, recalled in his memoir that at the time of the January 30 Malacañang attack, President Marcos nearly announced Martial Law. President Marcos suspected that a coup was being arranged against him as none of his generals are present, and he immediately evacuated Imelda and their children to a navy ship in Manila Bay.

=== February 12: Rally at Plaza Miranda ===
After the violence of the Battle of Mendiola, the Movement for a Democratic Philippines (MDP) organized a rally at the Plaza Miranda outside the Quiapo Church on February 12, 1970. With ten to fifty thousand people present, it became known for being the largest rally to take place in Plaza Miranda.

This rally was nearly called off when some conservative MDP leaders initially agreed to have a discussion with the President Marcos that evening, about concessions he was supposedly willing to offer if the leaders would call off the rally. However, KM leaders insisted on proceeding and made assurances that provocateurs would be kept out of the proceedings.

The protesters sat on the streets, climbed trees, and stood on the roofs of low buildings to spend hours listening to speakers discuss and oppose the concepts of imperialism, feudalism, and fascism.

=== February 18: First "People's Congress" and demonstration at the U.S. Embassy ===
The MDP-organized protest on February 18, 1970, was dubbed the "People's Congress," and involved about five thousand protesters who gathered at Plaza Miranda. At some point during this gathering, a group of protesters left the Plaza Miranda venue to stage a demonstration at the U.S. Embassy, which was nearby.

Chanting "Makibaka! Huwag matakot!," some of them broke off from the crowd and marched toward the U.S. Embassy. This group attacked the embassy with rocks and pillboxes as a way of expressing their denunciation of U.S. imperialism, and accusing the US of being fascist and of supporting Marcos. This continued for hours, lasting until the evening before the police arrived.

The next day, the American ambassador sent a note to the government protesting the "wanton vandalism" that took place the night before, and the Philippine government replied with a note of apology within three hours.

=== February 26: "Second People's Congress" demonstration ===
MDP militants planned what they dubbed a second "People's Congress" on February 26, 1970, despite not being granted a permit to rally. The radicals insisted on their right to assembly, insisting that the rally would go on with or without a permit.

The Manila police and MetroCom attacked the rallyists even before they settled down at Plaza Miranda, causing the militants to disperse. So the activists reassembled at the Sunken Garden outside the walls of Intramuros, and after a few speeches continued to march to the U.S. Embassy. They stoned the Embassy and fought against the police that arrived. The activists then fled and regrouped hours later on Mendiola to reenact the protest of January 30.

The police retaliated by breaking into the Philippine College of Commerce, hitting the students and professors, and ransacking the offices and classrooms.

=== March 3: The People's March from Welcome Rotonda to Plaza Lawton ===
The protest of March 3, 1970, was organized by the MDP students and urban groups in support of jeepney drivers who held a citywide strike on that date to protest "tong"(bribe)-collecting traffic policemen. Dubbed the "Peoples’ March," it involved a protest march from Welcome Rotonda on the boundary of Quezon City and the City of Manila, and passed by Tondo and Plaza Lawton before ending up at the U.S. Embassy.

According to reports, this march ended in one-sided battles between gun-toting police riot squads and stone-hurling demonstrators, seems to give people an endless number of reasons to hold mass gatherings of students, farmers, and laborers.

Even though the protest involved long walks from one assembly point to another, the organizations participating in the march multiplied. When the protesters reached the U.S. Embassy, where they again struggled with the police. The police were more aggressive this time, chasing the activists all over the city.

Enrique Sta. Brigida, a student of the Lyceum of the Philippines, was caught and tortured to death by the police. Poet Amado V. Hernandez wrote a poem, "Enrique Sta. Brigida: Paghahatid sa Imortalidad," (Tagalog "Deliverance to Immortality") which was read at Sta Brigida's funeral on March 10.

=== March 17: Second "People’s March" and "People’s Tribunal" at Plaza Moriones ===
Militants organized a second "People’s March" on March 17, in what would come to be recognized as the last major demonstration during the First Quarter Storm proper.

This second March was longer than the March 3 event. Since the protest focused on the issue of poverty, the march's route took it through the poor ghettos of Manila. Finding police already positioned at the Embassy when they arrived, and wanting to avoid a confrontation, the activists instead proceeded to Mendiola, where they made bonfires in the middle of the road. But the police followed them to Mendiola, dispersing the activists by releasing tear gas.

== Dissipation after March 17 ==
The March 17 demonstration is generally acknowledged as the last of the major events of the First Quarter Storm, because the demonstrations had largely been led by student groups, who had at that point reached the end of the Philippines' school semester. Many of the students left Manila to go home to the provinces for summer vacation, leading to a lull in protest actions.

However, numerous protests, including the Diliman Commune and the Movement of Concerned Citizens for Civil Liberties rallies led by Senator Jose W. Diokno continued in the period between the dissipation of the First Quarter Storm and the 1972 declaration of Martial Law.

== Aftermath ==
=== Senate investigation ===
The Senate convened a special committee to investigate the violence that had occurred at the January 1970 rallies. The committee released its findings on March 12, 1970. The committee said that the demonstrators did not have any firearms and questioned the military's decision to fire its weapons.

=== Compensation for victims ===
A bipartisan bill was passed identifying 6 demonstrators killed by law enforcers during the January 30 incident (including 2 who died of gunshot wounds days after the incident). The bill ordered the Department of Social Welfare to administer assistance to the families of the victims. Marcos signed the bill into law on September 30, 1971. Some of the PHP 500,000 compensation fund was distributed to claimants, though in 1977, during martial law, Marcos declared the compensation fund dormant and PHP 272,000 of the unclaimed amount reverted to the general fund.

=== Radicalization of the moderate opposition ===
Violent dispersals of various FQS protests were among the first watershed events in which large numbers of Filipino students of the 1970s were radicalized against the Marcos administration. Due to these dispersals, many students who had previously held "moderate" positions (i.e., calling for legislative reforms), such as like Edgar Jopson, became convinced that they had no choice but to call for more radical social change.

Similar watershed events would later include the February 1971 Diliman Commune; the August 1971 suspension of the writ of habeas corpus in the wake of the Plaza Miranda bombing; the September 1972 declaration of Martial Law; the 1980 murder of Macli-ing Dulag; the August 1983 assassination of Ninoy Aquino; and eventually, allegations of cheating during the 1986 Snap Elections which led to the non-violent 1986 EDSA Revolution.

In the aftermath of these events, Marcos lumped all of the opposition together and referred to them as communists, and many former moderates fled to the mountain encampments of the radical opposition to avoid being arrested by Marcos' forces. Those who became disenchanted with the excesses of the Marcos administration and wanted to join the opposition after 1971 often joined the ranks of the radicals, simply because they represented the only group vocally offering opposition to the Marcos government.

== Lead Up to martial law ==
The demonstrations that took place during the first quarter storm are historically remembered as the first stirrings of the social unrest which would eventually lead to Martial Law - what Petronilo Daroy referred to as "a torrent of mass protest actions against everything that was construed as ‘establishment.’"

In an editorial published in Philippine Panorama, Fred Reyes remarked that these bloody demonstrations may be the signs of an upcoming revolution, shying away from 'traditional Filipino values' such as bahala na, pakikisama, and utang na loob that have long hindered radical change. He also stressed that while it seems to be clear to all that change was needed, no one seemed to know what change was needed. He also noted the slight difference in tone regarding communism, as people seemed to be more understanding of their cause. He had also noted that despite the government's accusations, no communists were produced from the riot groups.

The First Quarter Storm was followed by a year of demonstrations, varying from picketing, long marches, live theater, people's tribunal, and parliament of the streets.

These demonstrations contributed to the image of a communist insurgency, which was used as justification for the declaration of Martial Law.

== Pro-Marcos responses ==
=== Veterans' March for Democracy ===
The Veterans Federation of the Philippines arranged a "March for Democracy" where the veterans strode around Intramuros, Rizal Park, Luneta grandstand, and then to the Sunken Garden, where speeches and a pledging ceremony were held. Col. Simeon Medalla, head of the Veterans Federation of the Philippines, explains that the rally was not Marcos-inspired, contrary to allegations sprung from rumors of American officials or allies being seen at the rally and the fact that the President himself was the most decorated veteran of the previous war. Their purpose, rather, was to "preserve the ideals and principles for which the people fought during the war," a statement inscribed on the large banner carried during the march. When the veterans' march was cast in a negative light by media the following morning, Medalla remarked in jest, "Was it because there was no violence in our rally?" On that note, Ben Florentino, head of the United Disabled Veterans Association of the Philippines, commented that if the 'young radical activists' had experienced the hardships of war as they had, then they would not be advocating violence.

Florentino and Medalla further stressed that veterans were the first group to stage demonstrations for the sake of demanding legitimate reforms from the government. They also felt the need to call for reforms but believed that these should be achieved peacefully and undergoing democratic processes. COMELEC Chairman Jamie N. Ferrer attributed the student demonstrations to the rampant corruption in the political system, while Civil Service Commissioner Abelardo Subido attributed them to the lack of dialogue between the youth and their elders, calling on parents to tell their children "what we need is a change through peaceful means to achieve economic independence." Although many veterans were gladdened by the spark of student activism, they denounced the emergence of some sectors seeking to harness student power for their own ends.

=== 1970 Philippine Independence Day celebration ===
On the evening of June 12, 1970, media reported that the 72nd anniversary of the declaration of Philippine independence would be celebrated differently from previous years. It was reported that there would not be a grand, colorful parade, in line with the Marcos administration's policy of fiscal restraint, but instead there would be a simple, public "military show" by the Philippine Military Academy, the Marine Drum and Bugle Corps, and the Blue Diamonds of the Philippine Air Force at eight o'clock in the morning. Furthermore, rather than tedious speeches in the middle of the day, the President would read a loyalty pledge to the Republic and the flag at seven o'clock in the morning, a time when demonstrators against the current regime could be avoided.

== Discussions on violence ==
=== Demonstrations as 'portents of things to come' ===
When the news of the January 30 riots broke out, spectators, especially parents of the students participating in the demonstration, were appalled by the military behavior in these riots, questioning the need for armed military men at Mendiola. Participating groups of the said riots claimed that the violence was sparked by Malacañang guards, who threw pellets at the protesters from the inside, thus provoking demonstrators to retaliate and to ram a fire truck into the Malacañang No. 4 gate. These incidents of violence were heightened to bloodshed by the arrival of MetroCom as some groups, such as Kabataang Makabayan, claim that the armed forces attacked the students, who were virtually unarmed.

This brought into question the necessity of arms in instilling the change that these students were demanding. Dr. Nemesio Prudente, an educator and an ardent defender of students, predicted then that the January 26 and 30 riots were 'mere portents of what is yet to come if the leadership does not meet the demands of our students,' - demands which are clean, honest competent leadership, reforms, social justice, elimination of poverty, quality and inexpensive education for all, and the right to participate in decision making. He commented on the violence, saying that it will continue until there is no proper understanding and open communication between government leaders and student groups.

These encounters exhibited the then growing prevalence of student activism, parallel to demonstrations in other countries wherein students played a large role such as the toppling of the Sukarno regime in Indonesia and the collapse of the Soviet Union and the 1991 August Coup and that through the Prague Spring.

=== Kabataang Makabayan's stand on violence ===
Since KM was founded under the aspiration of resuming and completing the Philippine Revolution of 1896, now fighting "a new type of colonialism," it sought to inspire nationalism once more in a time wherein it was considered as a dangerous concept. The organization's positive aspirations, however, are overlooked by due to the negative image of communism, brought about by the news of communist insurgents in other parts of the world and individual actions of KM members themselves, including the dissident movement in Negros, the capture of Leoncio Co and other youths in their alleged involvement in a Stalin university in Tarlak, and the rumored activism of founder Jose Maria Sison, alias Commander Guerrero, in the Huk movement in Central Luzon. As said by Astorga-Garcia:

The KM aims to break this monopoly of power by allying with workers, peasants, progressive intellectuals, professionals and the nationalist bourgeoisie in an effort to arouse and mobilize the masses towards the attainment of national freedom and democracy. This outlook, more than anything else, explains the persistent anti-American imperialist and anti-landlord tone in the programme, pronouncements and protest mass actions of the KM. This explains why it is for the scrapping of the parity, the abrogation of the Laurel-Langley, bases treaty, military assistance treaty, mutual defense treaty—in short, the elimination of RP-US 'special relations.' The KM stand on these and other important national issues have always been pursued by its members with a militance no other youth organization has equalled. That is why the military has long ago started a hate-KM campaign that has been equally militant, although oftentimes ridiculous and silly. Whenever violence erupts in a demonstration participated in by the KM, the military authorities are quick in pinpointing the KM as the instigator of violence.

However, the group justifies this violence by considering it as an objective reality while maintaining their position that, while KM has taken part in numerous demonstrations that had led to violence, the riots have been incited by the police and not their members. The KM was more concerned with the "politicalization of the masses," and if they wanted to stage an armed revolution, they would have come bearing arms to rallies.

== See also ==
- German student movement, late 1960s communist student movement in West Germany
- May 1968, general strike in 1968 France, against the Government of President Charles de Gaulle
- Tlatelolco massacre, violent student protests in 1968 Mexico just before the Summer Olympics held in Mexico City, Mexico
- U Thant funeral crisis
- 1989 Tiananmen Square protests
- Polish 1970 protests
- List of conflicts related to the Cold War
- Battle of Marawi
