= Isagani Serrano =

Filipino civil society organizer and sustainable development activist

Gani Serrano
- Born: Isagani Rodriguez Serrano; March 1, 1947; Samal, Bataan
- Died: February 22, 2019 (aged 71); Samal, Bataan
- Education: University of the East,University of the Philippines Diliman
- Occupation: Civil Society Organizer
- Awards: Honored at the Bantayog ng mga Bayani wall of remembrance

Isagani "Gani" Rodriguez Serrano (March 1, 1947 - February 22, 2019) was a Filipino civil society organizer and sustainable development advocate best known for his work as president of the Philippine Rural Reconstruction Movement (PRRM), and as co-founder of the Congress for a People’s Agrarian Reform (CPAR), which fought for the passage of the Philippines' 1988 Comprehensive Agrarian Reform Law.

== Career ==
He was involved in numerous other Philippine Civil Society Organizations, including Social Watch Philippines, the Global Call to Action Against Poverty. He was an activist during the Marcos dictatorship, and as a result, was caught, imprisoned, and tortured several times. He is recognized as one of the heroes of the resistance against the authoritarian regime, with his name inscribed on the wall of remembrance at the Philippines' Bantayog ng mga Bayani memorial, which honors the martyrs and heroes who resisted the Martial Law regime of Ferdinand Marcos.
