= Malayang Pagkakaisa ng Kabataang Pilipino =

1967–1972 Philippine communist youth organization

- Founded: November 30, 1967
- Ideology: Communism; Marxism–Leninism
- Mother party: PKP-1930

Malayang Pagkakaisa ng Kabataang Pilipino (Tagalog, "Free Union of Filipino Youth"), abbreviated MPKP was a youth organization in the Philippines. It was the youth and student wing of the pro-Soviet Partido Komunista ng Pilipinas-1930 (PKP). The MPKP was founded on November 30, 1967, as the PKP broke its links with the Kabataang Makabayan ("Patriotic Youth"). Whilst the KM developed a Maoist orientation under the leadership of Jose Maria Sison, the MPKP argued that protracted revolutionary war was not feasible considering the geography of the Philippines (a scattered archipelago, not bordering any socialist state). Some six hundred delegates took part in the founding congress of the MPKP, held in Cabiao, Nueva Ecija. The leading group of the MPKP had belonged to the KM in Central Luzon. Francisco Nemenzo Jr. was amongst the founders of the MPKP. As of 1970, the MPKP was estimated to have some 5,000 members, predominantly young peasants and rural workers. The MPKP published Struggle as its organ.

The MPKP participated in the Movement for a Democratic Philippines (MDP), a coalition of student movements born out of the protests against the 1969 elections. Ruben Torres, a lawyer who graduated from the University of the Philippines in 1966, was the president of the MPKP in 1970.

The MPKP was banned in 1972, as martial law was declared. As of that year, the estimated MPKP membership stood at around 10,000.

Imprisoned MPKP members were offered amnesty through Presidential Decree No. 571-A, which was signed on November 22, 1974 (this included amnesty for the PKP and related organizations).

== See also ==
- Kabataang Makabayan
- Student movement in the Philippines (1965–1972)
