= Samahang Demokratiko ng Kabataan =

- Leader: Sixto Carlos
- Chairman: Reynaldo Vea
- Vice-Chairman: Jerry Araos
- Secretary General: Antonio Hilario
- Founded: January 30, 1968
- Split from: Kabataang Makabayan
- Dissolved: 1975
- Ideology: Maoism; National democracy Libertarian socialism (until 1970); Factions: Anarchism (SDK-Mendiola chapter)
- National affiliation: Communist Party of the Philippines (since 1970)

The Samahang Demokratiko ng Kabataan (Association of Democratic Youth), formerly named as Samahan ng Demokratikong Kabataan until 1970, better known simply by its acronym, SDK, and its moniker, SADEKA, was a mass organization of student and youth activists who pushed for the ideology of National Democracy in the Philippines during the Marcos dictatorship. Initially established on January 30, 1968 by activists who broke away from the Kabataang Makabayan (KM), it eventually reconciled with KM under the multi-sectoral Movement for a Democratic Philippines (MDP) in the common effort to fight the dictatorship of Ferdinand Marcos. Declared illegal along with any other political organizations when Marcos declared Martial Law in September 1972, it was eventually dissolved in 1975 as the socialist-led resistance to Marcos' martial law administration shifted its tactics away from mass youth organizations.

The reasons for SDK breaking away from KM in 1968 centered on a greater emphasis on member education, and allowing members to show more initiative. As a result, it attracted many writers and artists among its ranks. Aside from the warm bodies the organization brought to the beleaguered anti-Marcos movement, SDK's made major contributions to the National Democracy movement, and ultimately the Philippines' Socialist Movement, through well-written papers on revolutionary theory, including “The University as a Base of the Cultural Revolution,” “The Orientation of the Filipino Youth Movement,” and "Hinggil sa Legal na Pakikibaka" ("On The Legal Struggle"). It was because of the influence of "Hinggil sa Legal na Pakikibaka" that the early mass organizations of the National Democracy movement, including KM and SDK, were eventually dissolved in mid-1975, as the movement decided to focus instead on other organizational forms.

With the successful ouster of Ferdinand Marcos, many former members of the SDK eventually chose to serve in various ways in Philippine Government and society, with some retaining their advocacy of National Democracy, while others have moved away from that ideology.
