= 1969 Philippine balance of payments crisis =

Economic crisis in the Philippines

The 1969 Philippine balance of payments crisis was a currency crisis experienced by the Philippine economy as a result of heavy government spending linked to Ferdinand Marcos' campaign for his second presidential term in 1969. It was notable for being the first major economic crisis of the Marcos Administration, and for triggering the social unrest which was the rationalization for the proclamation of martial law in 1972.

== Background ==
Ferdinand Marcos had been inaugurated as 10th President of the Republic of the Philippines on December 30, 1965. In 1969, he was eligible to run for a second term. However, no post-independence president of the republic had ever been elected to a second term. Although deficit spending during his first term already created an impression of success, making Marcos a very popular president at the end of his first term, his desire to be the first to win a second term led to the launch of US$50 million worth in infrastructure projects in 1969 and create even more of an impression of progress for the electorate.

This campaign spending spree was so massive that it caused a balance of payments crisis, so the government was compelled to seek a debt rescheduling plan with the International Monetary Fund. The IMF mandated stabilization plan which accompanied the agreement included numerous macroeconomic interventions, including a shift away from the Philippines’ historical economic strategy of import substitution industrialization and towards export-oriented industrialization; and the allowing the Philippine Peso to float and devalue.

== Impact ==
Marcos was proclaimed winner of the election in November 1969, and was inaugurated to his second term just before the new year, on December 30, 1969. The social impact of the 1969–1970 balance of payments crisis very quickly led to social unrest – so much so that Marcos went from winning the elections by a landslide in November to dodging effigies by protesters just two months later, in January 1970. The five student-led protest rallies of the first quarter of 1970 were so massive that they later became popularized as the "First Quarter Storm". The social unrest would continue beyond which was the rationalization for the proclamation of martial law in 1972.
