= Palimbang massacre =

1974 killing of Moro Muslims in the Philippines

Palimbang Mosque massacre
- Part of the Moro conflict
- Palimbang, Sultan Kudarat (Philippines)
- Location: 6.3432°N 124.1977°E; Malisbong, Palimbang, Sultan Kudarat, Philippines
- Date: September 24, 1974; 52 years ago (UTC +8)
- Target: Filipino Muslims
- Attack type: Mass shooting
- Weapon: Firearms
- Deaths: Unknown, estimates ranges from less than 200 to 3,000
- Perpetrator: Philippine Army
- No. of participants: 100 Soldiers
- Motive: Anti-Separatism

The Masjid Malisbong (H. Hamsa Tacbil Mosque) massacre, also known as Palimbang massacre, was the mass murder of Muslim Moros by units of the Philippine military on September 24, 1974, in the coastal village of Malisbong in Palimbang, Sultan Kudarat, Mindanao. Accounts compiled by the Moro Women's Center in General Santos state that 1,000 male Moros aged 11–70 were killed inside a mosque, 3,000 women and children aged 9–60 were detained – with the women being raped – and that 300 houses were razed by the government forces. The massacre occurred two years after Ferdinand Marcos declared martial law in September 1972.

The massacre started after the first four days on the fast of Ramadan when members of the Philippine Army arrived and captured barangay officials along with 700-800 to 1,000 other Muslims. For more than a month, the military murdered residents of the area. The massacre was described as "unusual compared to other massacres", due to its unknown amount of deaths but carries varying estimates, with the highest estimate being 3,000 fatalities. Testimonies show that victims were made to strip and dig their own graves before being killed by gunshot.

== Remuneration for victims ==
In 2011, the Moro Islamic Liberation Front sought compensation for the Moro victims of martial law violence in the wake of the distribution of $7.5 million in compensation for more than 1,000 individuals who filed a class action suit against the Marcoses. The MILF claimed that thousands of Moros were killed in massacres such as what took place in Malisbong, perpetrated by soldiers and state-sponsored paramilitary forces during martial law. These included the Manili massacre, Tacub massacre, Patikul massacre, and Pata Island massacre.

In 2014, the Philippine government finally recognized 1,000 Moro residents of Malisbong village killed in the massacre as martial law victims. Representatives of the Commission on Human Rights helped facilitate the claims of the survivors and the families of the massacre victims to the Php10 billion fund set by the government for the indemnification of human rights victims during the martial law regime of Ferdinand Marcos, in keeping with the provisions of Republic Act No. 10368, or the Human Rights Victims Reparation and Recognition Act of 2013.

== In popular culture ==
Forbidden Memory is a 2016 film based on the Malisbong massacre, directed by Davao-based Maguindanao filmmaker Gutierrez Mangansakan. It won Best Documentary from the three finalists in the 12th Cinema One Originals, the annual film festival sponsored by Cinema One.

== Denial ==
Rigoberto Tiglao and Juan Ponce Enrile have denied that the massacre had ever happened.
