= Manili massacre =

1971 killing of Moro Muslims in the Philippines

- Part of the Moro conflict
- Carmen, North Cotabato (Philippines)
- Location: 7.38°N 124.82°E; Manili, Carmen, North Cotabato, Philippines
- Date: June 19, 1971 (UTC +8)
- Target: Filipino Muslims
- Attack type: Mass shooting
- Weapons: Small arms, hand grenade, bladed weapons
- Deaths: Unknown, estimated to be 70–106
- Injuries: 17
- Perpetrators: Ilaga & Philippine Constabulary
- No. of participants: 20 Ilaga members Unknown number of Philippine Constabulary troopers
- Motive: Revenge killing in retaliation for purported killing of Christians in earlier incidents

The Manili massacre refers to the mass murder of 70 to 106 Moro Muslims, including women and children, committed in a mosque in Manili, Carmen, North Cotabato, Philippines on June 19, 1971. The Muslim residents of the town had gathered in their mosque to participate in a supposed peace talk with Christian groups when a group of armed men dressed in uniforms similar to those worn by members of the Philippine Constabulary opened fire on them.

It was suspected that the Ilaga militant group were the attack's perpetrators, but there were also allegations that the Philippine Constabulary had collaborated with the Ilaga. No one was found culpable for the incident; Feliciano Lucas, also known as "Commander Toothpick", the Ilaga leader who was the prime suspect in the crime, was released after he "surrendered" to Ferdinand Marcos at the Malacañang Palace. The incident resulted in increased hostilities between Moro Muslims and Christians. In response to the incident, former Libyan leader Muammar Gaddafi provided military aid to the secessionist group Moro National Liberation Front.

== Incident ==
Local Christian leaders called local Moro Muslims to come to a meeting inside a mosque to discuss matters, when 20 Ilaga members and an unknown number of Philippine Constabulary troopers surrounded the area and requested the Moros give up their firearms, they were unable to do so as they had no firearms at all.

The perpetrators shot dead Hajji Yusof Nagle, A local leader at short range before throwing grenades and began firing onto the mosque and utilizing melee weapons The Christian Militiamen also reportedly cut off the ears of the Moro Muslims either alive or dead A teenage Moro Muslim girl was also reportedly taken to a nearby house and raped before being killed

Samirudin Nagli, A survivor of the incident gave a testimony stating "My mother was shot in the chest. She used her body as a shield to protect me. When rescuers came, they found me beneath her, still in her embrace"

After the initial incident, The Philippine Constabulary troopers went to a nearby school and massacred 2 people there, though they failed to enter the main room, the people screamed until the firing stopped

== See also ==
- Moro conflict
- Ilaga
- Palimbang massacre
- Tacub massacre
- Moro National Liberation Front
- Moro people
