= Ferdinand Marcos =

President of the Philippines from 1965 to 1986

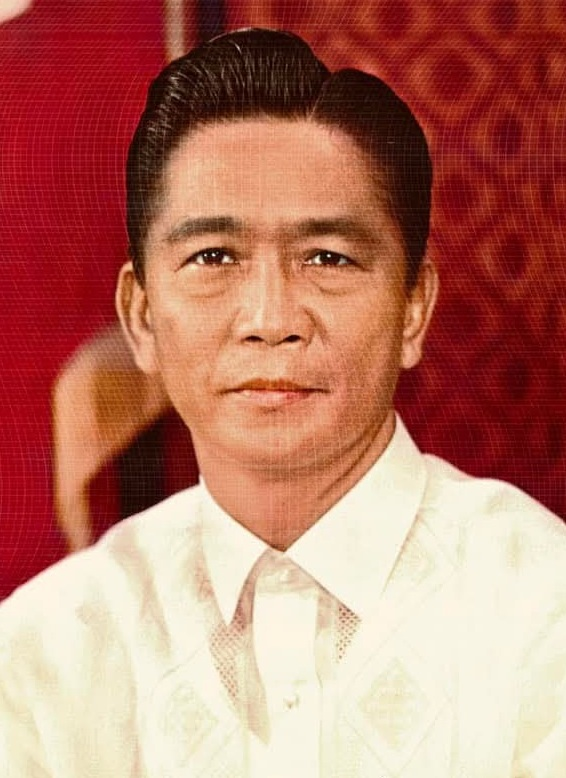
- Official portrait, 1969

10th President of the Philippines
- In office December 30, 1965 – February 25, 1986
- Prime Minister: Himself (1978–1981); Cesar Virata (1981–1986)
- Vice President: Fernando Lopez (1965–1972); Abolished (1972–1984); Vacant (1984–1986)
- Preceded by: Diosdado Macapagal
- Succeeded by: Corazon Aquino

3rd Prime Minister of the Philippines
- In office June 12, 1978 – June 30, 1981
- Preceded by: Office re-established; position previously held by Pedro Paterno
- Succeeded by: Cesar Virata

Governor of Metro Manila
- Acting; February 17, 1978 – June 12, 1978
- Preceded by: Imelda Marcos
- Succeeded by: Imelda Marcos

Secretary of National Defense
- In office August 28, 1971 – January 3, 1972
- President: Himself
- Preceded by: Juan Ponce Enrile
- Succeeded by: Juan Ponce Enrile
- In office December 31, 1965 – January 20, 1967
- President: Himself
- Preceded by: Macario Peralta
- Succeeded by: Ernesto Mata
Political offices 1949‍–‍1965
11th President of the Senate of the Philippines
In office April 5, 1963 – December 30, 1965
Preceded by	Eulogio Rodriguez
Succeeded by	Arturo Tolentino
Senate Minority Leader
In office January 25, 1960 – January 22, 1962
Preceded by	Ambrosio Padilla
Succeeded by	Estanislao Fernandez
Senator of the Philippines
In office December 30, 1959 – December 30, 1965
House Minority Leader
In office January 27, 1958 – December 30, 1959
Preceded by	Eugenio Pérez
Succeeded by	Cornelio Villareal
Member of the House of Representatives from Ilocos Norte's 2nd district
In office December 30, 1949 – December 30, 1959
Preceded by	Pedro Albano
Succeeded by	Simeon Valdez
6th President of the Liberal Party
In office January 21, 1961 – April 1964
Preceded by	Diosdado Macapagal
Succeeded by	Cornelio Villareal

Personal details
- Born: Ferdinand Emmanuel Edralin Marcos; September 11, 1917 Sarrat, Ilocos Norte, Philippine Islands
- Died: September 28, 1989 (aged 72) Honolulu, Hawaii, US
- Resting place: Ferdinand E. Marcos Presidential Center, Batac, Ilocos Norte (1993‍–‍2016); Libingan ng mga Bayani, Taguig, Metro Manila (since 2016; disputed)
- Party: KBL (1978–1989)
- Other political affiliations: Liberal (1946–1964); Nacionalista (1964–1978)
- Spouses: Carmen Ortega (common‑law) (before 1954) Imelda Romualdez (m. 1954)
- Children: 9, including Imee, Bongbong, Irene, and Aimee
- Parents: Mariano Marcos (father); Josefa Edralin (mother)
- Relatives: Marcos family
- Education: University of the Philippines Manila (LL.B)
- Occupation: Jurist; lawyer; politician
- Nicknames: Apo Lakay; Ferdie; Macoy

Military service
- Allegiance: Philippines; United States (Note: During the Commonwealth era; the United States controlled the Philippines as a protectorate)
- Years of service: 1942–1945
- Rank: First lieutenant; Major
- Unit: 21st Infantry Division (USAFFE); 14th Infantry Regiment (USAFIP-NL)
- Battles/wars: World War II
- Criminal charges: Murder; contempt of court (1939)
- Criminal penalty: 10–17 years imprisonment; (1940)
- Criminal status: Acquitted on appeal (1940)
- Ferdinand Marcos's voice Speaking in a Press Conference requesting the Armed Forces of the Philippines to "disperse the crowd without shooting them" as a response to mass protests against his presidency (Recorded on February 24, 1986)

Ferdinand Emmanuel Edralin Marcos Sr. (Note: Pronunciation: UK: /ˈmɑːrkɒs/ MAR-koss, US: /-koʊs, -kɔːs/ -kohss, -kawss; Tagalog: [ˈmaɾkɔs].) (September 11, 1917 – September 28, 1989) was a Filipino lawyer and politician who served as the tenth president of the Philippines from 1965 to 1986. From 1972 to 1981, Marcos ruled the Philippines under martial law, embracing a policy of "constitutional authoritarianism." Following the lifting of martial law in 1981, a wide-ranging economic crisis, and the assassination of Ninoy Aquino, Marcos was deposed in 1986 by the People Power Revolution and was succeeded as president by Aquino's widow, Corazon Aquino. He was also the father of Bongbong Marcos, the incumbent president of the Philippines since 2022.

Marcos was born in Ilocos Norte in 1917. His father, Mariano Marcos, was a lawyer and politician who was later executed by guerillas for collaboration with the Japanese Army during World War II. In 1940, Marcos and his father were convicted of assassinating a political rival, Julio Nalundasan, but the conviction was overturned on appeal. Marcos joined the United States Army after the attack on Pearl Harbor in 1941 and fought the Japanese, who held him as a prisoner of war in 1942. After the war, he practiced law and was elected to represent Ilocos Norte in the Philippines House of Representatives from 1949 to 1959. He was elected to the Senate of the Philippines from 1959 to 1965, and served as Senate president from 1963 to 1965. He advanced his political career by exaggerating his military record, fraudulently including claims that he was "the most decorated war hero in the Philippines."

In 1965, Marcos was elected to his first term as president; he was re-elected in 1969. His initial policies included massive infrastructure development and construction, which made him popular but were funded by foreign lending. During his second term, debt and inflation crises and growing Philippine involvement in the Vietnam War triggered domestic social unrest. In 1972, Marcos declared martial law, ruling the country as a dictator until 1981. His rule was ratified through a 1973 plebiscite administered and overseen by the military. During this period, the constitution was revised to empower Marcos, and media outlets and opposition politicians were silenced. The Marcos regime used violence to suppress political opposition, including Muslims and suspected communists, whom he declared a threat to the Philippines. He referred to his ideology during this period as the "movement for a new society" and founded the political party Kilusang Bagong Lipunan to advance his ideas.

After the formal end of martial law in 1981, Marcos was elected to a third term. His popularity suffered in 1983, however, due to an economic collapse and the assassination of Ninoy Aquino, leader-in-exile of the opposition. Disapproval manifested in the resurgence of the political opposition in the 1984 parliamentary elections. Subsequent investigative reporting on his family's extensive overseas financial holdings and false war records led Marcos to call snap elections in 1986. He was challenged by Aquino's widow, Corazon Aquino. Although official results declared Marcos the victor, allegations of mass electoral fraud, political turmoil, and human rights abuses led to the People Power Revolution of February 1986, which ultimately removed him from power after two decades. On advice from United States president Ronald Reagan, the Marcos family fled to Hawaii, where he died in 1989.

Marcos, who was viewed as a dictator, remains a controversial figure in the Philippines, with his tenure widely described a kleptocracy marked by corruption, extravagance, and brutality. His wife, Imelda Marcos, became infamous in her own right for the excesses that characterized their "conjugal dictatorship", coining the term Imeldific, and the family allegedly stole as much as $10 billion from the Central Bank of the Philippines during his rule. Despite his removal from office and death in exile, many members of the Marcos government remained in politics, including Fidel Ramos, who succeeded Aquino as president in 1992. His children, Imee and Bongbong Marcos, remain active in Philippine politics, with Bongbong serving as president since 2022. They have denied accusations of human rights violations by their parents.

== Early life and education ==
Ferdinand Emmanuel Edralin Marcos was born in Sarrat, Ilocos Norte, on September 11, 1917. His father, Mariano Marcos (1897–1945), was a lawyer who represented Ilocos Norte in the House of Representatives of the Philippines from 1925 to 1931. His mother, Josefa Edralin Marcos (1893–1988), was a schoolteacher. Marcos was of Chinese mestizo descendant. He later claimed to be descended from revolutionary hero Antonio Luna, a claim since debunked by genealogist Mona Magno-Veluz. Marcos also claimed descent from Limahong (Chinese: 林阿鳳), a 16th-century pirate who used to raid the coasts of the South China Sea.

=== Education ===
From 1923 to 1929, Marcos attended Sarrat Elementary School, Shamrock Elementary School (in Laoag), and Ermita Elementary School (in Manila). He received his secondary education at University of the Philippines High School and attended University of the Philippines Manila, studying liberal arts before studying law at University of the Philippines College of Law. At the College of Law, he joined Upsilon Sigma Phi, where he first met many of his future colleagues and critics. He excelled in his studies and in extracurricular activities, joining the university's swimming, boxing, wrestling, and rifle teams. He was a national rifle champion and an accomplished orator, debater, and writer for the student newspaper. Marcos served as a battalion commander in the Reserve Officers' Training Corps (ROTC) and was commissioned as a third lieutenant in the Philippine Constabulary Reserve.

In 1939, Marcos took the bar exam; he was a top scorer with a score of 92.35 percent and graduated cum laude. He was elected to the Pi Gamma Mu and the Phi Kappa Phi international honor societies. Marcos received an honorary Doctor of Laws (LL.D.) (honoris causa) degree in 1967 from Central Philippine University.

=== Assassination of Julio Nalundasan ===
In 1934, Mariano Marcos lost his campaign for re-election to the House of Representatives to Julio Nalundasan. Mariano Marcos challenged Nalundasan again in the 1935 election but was defeated. On the day after the election, September 21, 1935, Nalundasan was killed by a single rifle shot at his home in Batac. In December 1938, two witnesses accused Ferdinand Marcos, Mariano, and Ferdinand's uncles Pio Marcos and Quirino Lizardo of conspiring to assassinate Nalundasan. At the time, Ferdinand was still studying law and a national champion as a member of the university rifle team. On the night of the assassination, Ferdinand's rifle was in its rack in the ROTC armory. However, the rifle of team captain Teodoro Kalaw was missing, and Ferdinand had access to the armory. A National Bureau of Investigation concluded that Kalaw's rifle was the murder weapon. Ferdinand and his uncle Quirino were convicted of murder, and Ferdinand was sentenced to 10 to 17 years in prison.

He appealed his conviction to the Supreme Court of the Philippines. The Supreme Court overturned the lower court's decision on October 22, 1940, acquitting both men of all charges except contempt of court. Justice Jose P. Laurel, who wrote the majority decision, persuaded his colleagues to acquit Marcos. Laurel himself had been convicted of frustrated murder as a young man after he almost killed a rival during a youthful brawl but was acquitted after his own appeal to the Supreme Court.

== Military service and early political career ==
=== World War II ===
Marcos's military service record, and his alleged exaggeration of it, have been the source of controversy and confusion. Near the end of his presidency, researchers found that most stories about Marcos's military service were inaccurate or untrue.

Following the attack on Pearl Harbor and Japanese invasion of the Philippines in December 1941, Marcos was called into service in the United States Army. He fought with the United States until April 1942, when he was taken prisoner by the Japanese at the Battle of Bataan. Official Army records show that he was assigned to the intelligence service in the 21st Infantry Division under Mateo M. Capinpin. Despite his later claims of heroism at the battle, there are no contemporaneous records of any awards or decorations received by Marcos, and his commander and other officers did not corroborate his claims. However, official dispatches reference Marcos bringing a wounded officer to the rear and note that the 21st Infantry Division did not receive sufficient recognition for their actions at Bataan.

After surrendering, Marcos survived the Bataan Death March. According to Marcos's own account, he was released by the Japanese on August 4, 1942. This claim later became controversial when it was cited as evidence that Marcos's father had served as a Japanese collaborator, as the Japanese only released prisoners who had severe health problems or whose families had cooperated with Japanese authorities. In 1945, his father was executed by Filipino guerillas by drawing and quartering using carabaos. His remains were left hanging on a tree. At least one contemporary Japanese official recorded Ferdinand himself as a Japanese propagandist.

After his release, Marcos claimed to have led a guerrilla force of nine thousand in northern Luzon; these claims have been contradicted and ruled criminal by the United States Army investigators. According to Primitivo Mijares, Marcos also filed a fraudulent war reparations claim for millions of dollars in cattle. Military records show that Marcos rejoined U.S. forces in December 1944 until his discharge with the rank of major in May 1945.

=== Political rise (1949–1965) ===
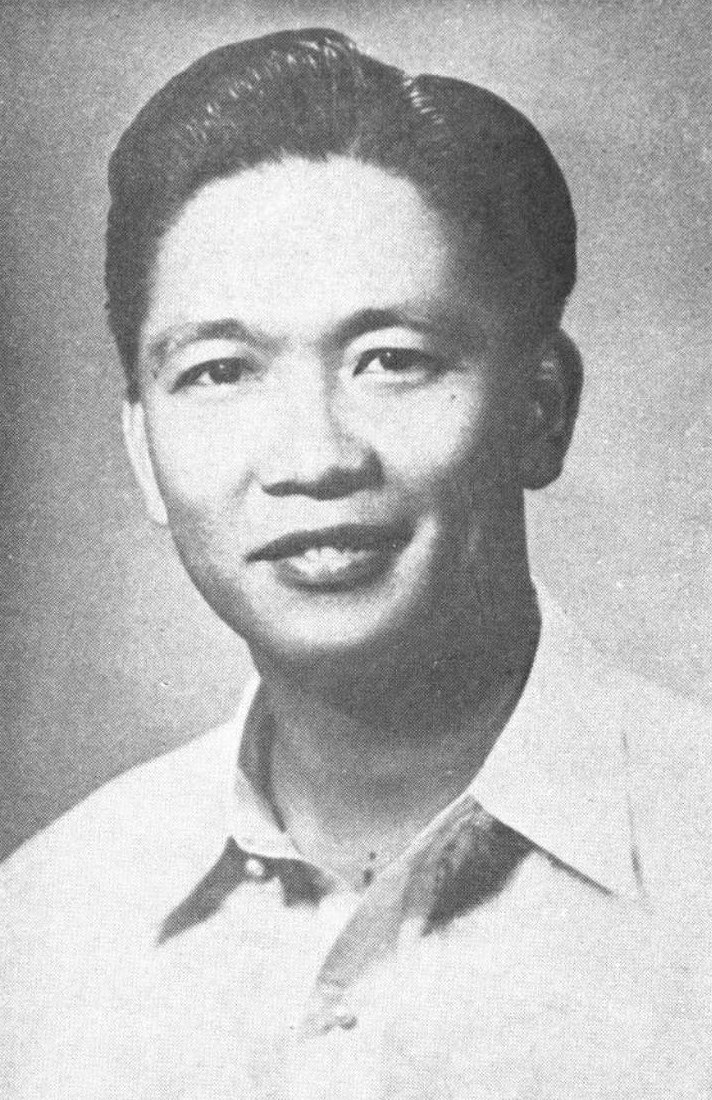
Marcos in 1960

After World War II, the Philippines gained political independence from the United States on July 4, 1946. Marcos was appointed as one of eleven special prosecutors, tasked to prosecute those accused of collaboration with the Japanese. Leveraging this appointment and his exaggerated war record, Marcos eventually entered politics as a member of the new Liberal Party. In 1949, Marcos ran for his father's former seat in Ilocos Norte's 2nd congressional district. He won and was re-elected to the House of Representatives twice, serving until 1959.

The Liberal Party had split from the Nacionalista Party in 1946. Marcos later became the party's economic spokesman and chaired the House Committee on Commerce and Industry. He also served on the committees on Defense, Ways and Means; Industry; Banks Currency; War Veterans; Civil Service; and Corporations and Economic Planning. He was also a member of the Special Committee on Import and Price Controls, the Special Committee on Reparations, and the House Electoral Tribunal.

After serving three terms in the House, Marcos was elected to the Senate in 1959. He became minority floor leader in the Senate in 1960 and served as party president from 1961 to 1964. From 1963 to 1965, he was Senate President. He introduced significant bills, many of which were enacted. During his 1962 campaign, Marcos claimed to be the most decorated Filipino veteran of World War II, having garnered almost every medal and decoration awarded by the American or Philippine government, including the Distinguished Service Cross and Medal of Honor. The Liberal Party later confirmed that many of the medals were awarded to Marcos in 1962 to aid in his Senate election campaign.

== Presidency (1965–1986) ==
Presidential styles of Ferdinand Marcos
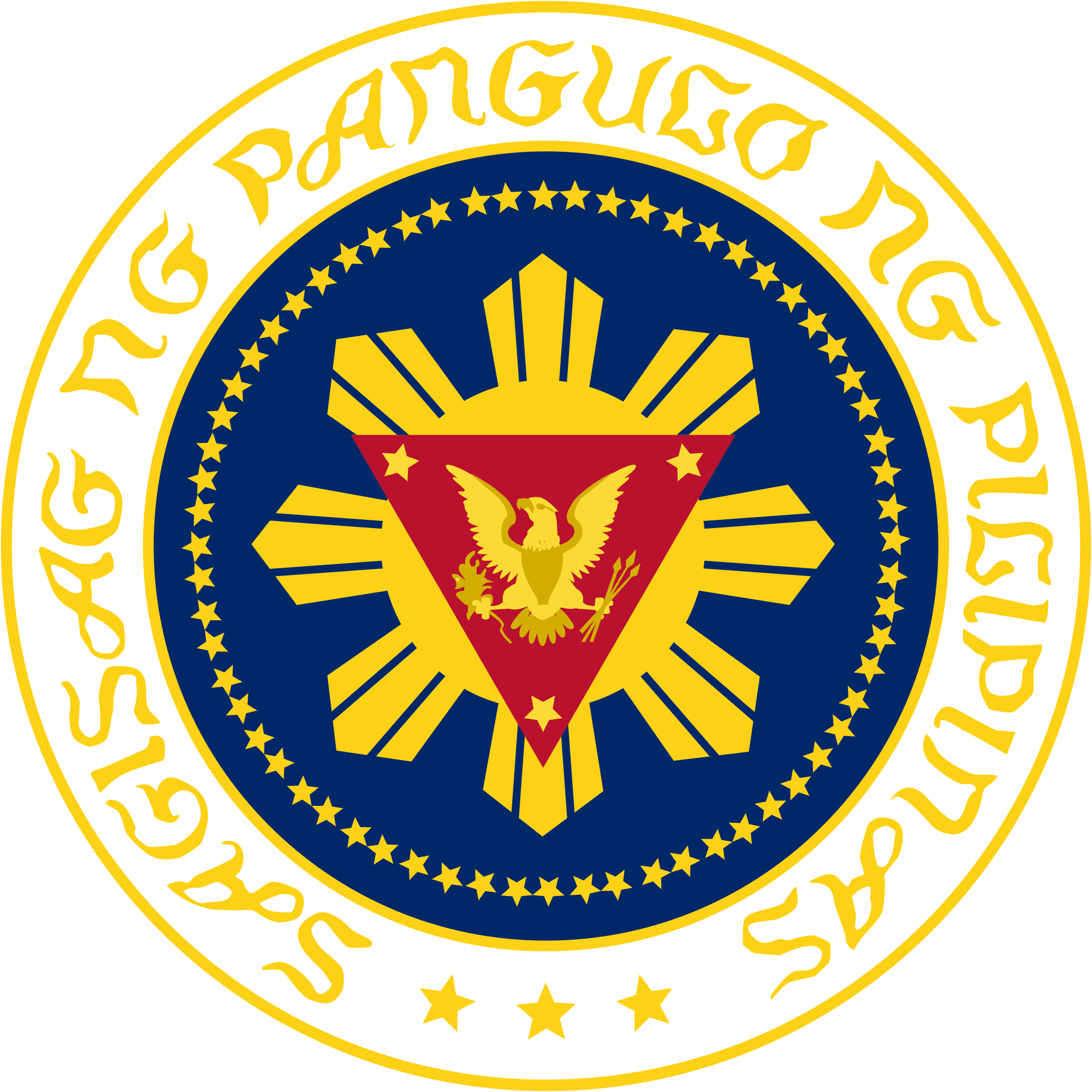
- Reference style: His Excellency
- Spoken style: Your Excellency
- Alternative style: Mr. President

=== First term (1965–1969) ===
==== 1965 presidential campaign ====
In 1965, Marcos expected incumbent president Diosdado Macapagal to step aside and support his campaign for president. Marcos had managed Macapagal's 1961 campaign in exchange for Macapagal's support in 1965. Stung by Macapagal's broken promise, Marcos left the Liberal Party to join the Nacionalista Party and run for president on a populist platform. With the support of Faustino del Mundo, leader of the Hukbalahap guerrilla remnants and organized crime in Pampanga and southern Tarlac, Marcos was able to mobilize resources and utilize coercive violence to win Central Luzon, which was crucial to the election. On October 13, 1965, at least one person was killed and five wounded in a clash between gangs supporting Macapagal and Marcos.

Marcos won the election and was inaugurated as the 10th president of the Philippines on December 30, 1965.

==== Domestic infrastructure and education policies ====
As president, Marcos launched an aggressive program of infrastructure development funded by foreign loans. From 1966 to 1970, Marcos increased infrastructure spending in the Philippines by 70 percent, and as of 2011, Marcos had spent more annually on infrastructure than any other president of the Philippines. Major projects included the construction of the Cultural Center of the Philippines complex. Critics have referred to the Marcos policy of major construction and infrastructure building to curry public support as an "edifice complex."

Projects completed during Marcos's rule from 1965 to 1986 included major healthcare infrastructure, including the leading centers for heart, lung, and kidney care in the Philippines, and transportation infrastructure, including the Marcos Bridge between Leyte and Samar, the Pan-Philippine Highway, and the Manila Light Rail Transit. These projects were typically constructed on a rush basis, often compromising their structural safety. Marcos also emphasized educational infrastructure, including public school buildings and roads to connect communities to them, during his first presidential term. Ultimately, forty-seven colleges and universities were established during Marcos's term in office from 1965 to 1986.

Spending during his first term outpaced tax revenues, but Marcos continued to promise "rice, roads, and school buildings" as the cornerstone of his 1969 re-election campaign. Marcos covered the gap with foreign lending, leading to a 72 percent increase in the budget deficit over Macapagal's term in office. Although he remained popular for most of his first term, these policies created long-term economic instability and required that Marcos rely on foreign support to preserve his rule.

Marcos also used construction projects to advance the political and public profile of his wife, Imelda Marcos. In 1966, he announced the Cultural Center of the Philippines Complex by executive order, with Imelda serving as its chair. Other cultural and heritage cites constructed by Marcos included the Nayong Pilipino, the Philippine International Convention Center, and the Manila Film Center. By 1977–1980, projects in the "conspicuous capital outlays" category had ballooned to account for 20 percent of the Philippines' capital outlays.

==== Vietnam War, foreign policy, and militarism ====
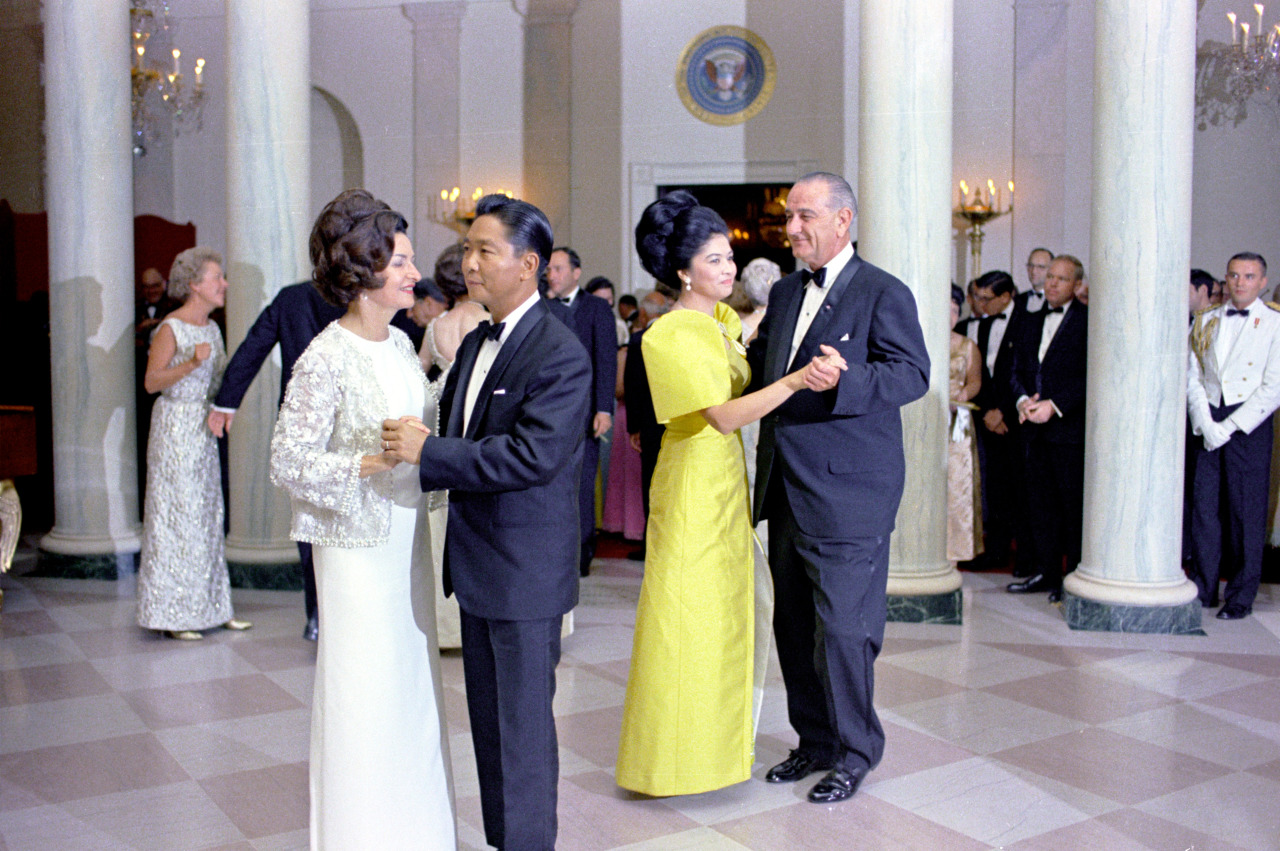
Marcos (pictured here with Lady Bird Johnson, his wife Imelda, and Lyndon B. Johnson) maintained strong relations with the United States during the Cold War.

As president, Marcos pursued a close relationship with the United States, protecting and maintaining U.S. military bases in the Philippines as part of the ongoing Cold War conflict. Marcos relied on the relationship to sustain his regime. Marcos also leveraged U.S. interests to advance his political career; for example, Marcos threatened to search every visiting American naval vessel during his 1969 presidential campaign. However, Marcos secretly assured the United States that he had no desire for American withdrawal; in response, the United States injected millions into the Philippine government's banking system, boosting his popularity and re-election campaign. Marcos repeatedly took public stands critical of United States influence, leveraging the implied threat to secure increased aid.

Under pressure from the Lyndon B. Johnson administration in the 1960s, Marcos reversed his prior position by permitting Philippine involvement in the Vietnam War in the form of the Philippine Civic Action Group (PHILCAG), a combat engineer unit, despite some opposition within the Philippine Congress. PHILCAG were involved from the middle of 1966, growing to a strength of 1,600 troops by 1968. Between 1966 and 1970, over 10,000 Filipino soldiers served in Vietnam, mainly involved in civilian infrastructure projects. Marcos secretly assured the US he had no desire for an American withdrawal. He had received warnings from the Philippine embassy that US aid was at risk in Congress. Marcos returned to the implied threats. In one speech, he stated that the bases were a threat to regional peace and security while reminding the US of its "solemn obligation" to continue aid. In late 1976, the US offered $1 billion of mixed grants and loans to the Philippines, but Marcos rejected the offer.

Despite his alignment with the United States, Marcos also pursued informal alignment with the Soviet Union within the Sino-Soviet split. The Partido Komunista ng Pilipinas-1930 (PKP-1930), which had supported his 1965 election and was Soviet-aligned, was challenged by the Communist Party of the Philippines, which was Maoist, in 1968. Although PKP-1930 was officially illegal, Marcos appointed some members to positions within his government as salaried researchers, and they were then used as an informal channel of negotiation with the Soviet Union and the Eastern Bloc.

Despite his general anticommunism and opposition to the People's Republic of China under Mao Zedong, Marcos softened his tone in 1969, publicly asserting the need for the Philippines to establish a diplomatic relationship with the People's Republic of China. In his January 1969 State of the Nation Address, he said,

We, in Asia must strive toward a modus vivendi with Red China. I reiterate this need, which is becoming more urgent each day. Before long, Communist China will have increased its striking power a thousand fold with a sophisticated delivery system for its nuclear weapons. We must prepare for that day. We must prepare to coexist peaceably with Communist China.

During his first term, Marcos developed close relationships with Philippine military officers and significantly expanded the armed forces by allowing loyal generals to remain in their positions past their age of retirement. Loyal officers who did retire were granted positions in his government. He also significantly expanded the military budget, utilizing military personnel for civic projects such as school construction. In an unprecedented move, Marcos chose to concurrently serve as his own defense secretary, giving him direct control over the military. In 1968, Senator Ninoy Aquino accused Marcos of trying to establish a "garrison state."

==== Jabidah massacre and Moro conflict ====
In March 1968, Jibin Arula testified that he had been the lone survivor of a group of Moro army recruits that had been executed en masse on Corregidor by the Armed Forces of the Philippines on March 18, 1968, which came to be known as the Jabidah massacre. Arula's allegations were the subject of a critical exposé by Ninoy Aquino and became a major catalyst of the Moro insurgency. When none of the officers implicated in the massacre were convicted, many Filipino Muslims, especially intellectuals and educated youth, were enraged. They came to believe that the Manila government had little regard for their safety or interests, and efforts at integration and accommodation were abandoned. Dissent led to the formation of the Muslim Independence Movement in 1968, which later consolidated with the Bangsamoro Liberation Organization to form the Moro National Liberation Front in October 1972.

=== Second term (1969–1972) ===
Marcos's second term was characterized by social unrest, beginning with the 1969 balance of payments crisis, which was triggered by exuberant infrastructure spending. Opposition groups began to form, with moderate opposition calling for political reform and radicals espousing revolutionary ideology. A period of unrest and political violence culminated in Marcos's 1972 declaration of martial law, ending his term early and establishing himself as the constitutional dictator of the Philippines.

==== Assassination plot and social unrest ====
Early in Marcos's second term, Philippine and United States government officials alleged that a group composed mostly of retired military officers, headed by Liberal Party official Terry Adevoso, had organized a revolutionary junta that sought to discredit and kill Marcos. The plot allegedly included Vice President Fernando Lopez.

In addition to private opposition seeking to supplant Marcos, citizens concerned with the economic crisis and Marcos's spending policies challenged his political program. In addition to the student revolts, political opposition to the Marcos government grew. Opposition senators Lorenzo Tañada, Jovito Salonga, and Jose W. Diokno accused Marcos of seeking to exceed the two-term constitutional limitation and of increasing authoritarianism. Organizations opposing Marcos during this period included the NUS, National Students League, and the Movement of Concerned Citizens for Civil Liberties (MCCCL), led by Diokno. The MCCCL staged mass rallies, attracting as many as 50 thousand attendees. Media reports classified the various opposition groups as either "moderate" or "radical." Moderates included Catholic organizations, civil libertarians, and nationalist politicians who sought political reforms. Radicals included labor and student groups who wanted more systemic social and economic reform.

By 1970, campus study sessions on Marxism–Leninism in the Philippines had become common, and many students joined organizations associated with the National Democracy movement, including the Kabataang Makabayan (led by Jose Maria Sison), Samahang Demokratiko ng Kabataan, and Malayang Pagkakaisa ng Kabataang Pilipino. The Marcos administration often made no distinction between the moderate political opposition and the student revolutionaries. Consistent with the Cold War geopolitical framework, in which the Philippines was a key regional ally of the United States against the Chinese Communist Party, Marcos broadly labeled his opposition as communist or, more specifically, Maoist. With the participation of the armed forces, Marcos waged a campaign to eliminate the Communist Party of the Philippines. emphasizing it as a threat to Philippine society. According to American foreign policy scholar Richard J. Kessler, Marcos "mythologized the group, investing it with a revolutionary aura that only attracted more supporters."

Marcos responded to the civil unrest in his January 26, 1970, State of the Nation address. During the address, the National Union of Students (NUS) organized a protest outside Congress, inviting other students to join. As Marcos and his wife Imelda left the building, the students threw stones, a stuffed alligator, and a coffin at them. Opposition groups quickly grew on campuses. Students declared a week-long boycott of classes and instead met to organize rallies. Protests led by student groups continued through the end of the university semester in March, and Marcos deployed military force to quell the demonstrators. This period became known as the First Quarter Storm. Another major protest took place on January 30, in front of the presidential palace. Activists rammed through the palace gate with a fire truck and charged the grounds, tossing rocks, pillboxes, and Molotov cocktails. At least two activists were killed, and several were injured by police. Further major protests included a rally on February 12; a rally on February 18, which set fire to the lobby of the United States embassy; a demonstration on February 26; and marches on March 3 and 17. Some media accounts collectively called these the "seven deadly protests of the First Quarter Storm".

In total, the protests included 50 to 100 thousand participants. The violent response to the protest further radicalized some moderate students against the Marcos government. A significant number of activists did join the Communist Party of the Philippines and began to relocate from the cities to be more extensively deployed in rural areas, where some became guerillas. On December 29, 1970, Philippine Military Academy instructor Victor Corpus defected from the armed forces to join the armed wing of the Communist Party, the New People's Army (NPA), in a raid on the academy armory, capturing rifles, machine guns, grenade launchers, a bazooka, and thousands of rounds of ammunition. In 1972, Mao Zedong supplied 1,200 M14 and AK-47 rifles to the NPA aboard the MV Karagatan to aid its campaign to defeat the government, part of the people's war doctrine.

==== 1971 constitutional convention ====
Statesmen and politicians opposed to the Marcos administration mostly focused on political and legal reform, including reform of elections and a call for Marcos to comply with the constitutional two-term limit. During his first term, on March 16, 1967, opposition politicians in the Philippine Congress had passed Resolution No. 2, calling for a constitutional convention to address these reforms. Marcos surprised his critics by endorsing the move; historians later noted that Marcos hoped the convention would eliminate the two-term limit on the presidency. On November 10, 1970, a special election was held to elect 320 convention delegates. Prominent delegates included former senators Raul Manglapus and Roseller T. Lim. Other notable figures who would have careers in politics included Hilario Davide Jr., Marcelo Fernan, Sotero Laurel, Nene Pimentel, Teofisto Guingona Jr., Raul Roco, Edgardo Angara, Dick Gordon, and Margarito Teves.

The convention met on June 1, 1971, at Quezon City Hall. However, its proceedings were marred by politics and delay. The convention also suffered a serious blow to its credibility in May 1972, when a delegate exposed a bribery scheme implicating First Lady Imelda Marcos, in which delegates were paid to vote for Marcos's position. The convention and the investigation into the bribery scheme were eventually shelved when Marcos declared martial law in September 1972 and had eleven opposition delegates arrested.

==== Plaza Miranda bombing and false flag allegations ====
On August 21, 1971, a fatal bombing occurred at Plaza Miranda in Quiapo, Manila, where the Liberal Party was holding a political campaign rally. The government blamed the bombing on the Communist Party, and Marcos issued Proclamation No. 889, assuming emergency powers and suspending the writ of habeas corpus. During this period, the government ignored any distinction between moderates and radicals. In response to political persecution, many moderates joined the radicals, massively expanding the underground socialist resistance. After the end of military rule, unnamed former Communist officials blamed the Plaza Miranda bombing on Jose Maria Sison, whom they said had calculated the bombings to provoke Marcos into further political repression. Sison has denied these claims or any involvement by Aquino or the Communist Party, and the Communist Party has never offered official confirmation. Some historians claim Marcos was responsible for the Plaza Miranda bombing, as he is known to have used false flag operations as a pretext for martial law. United States intelligence documents declassified in the 1990s contained evidence implicating Marcos, provided by a Central Intelligence Agency mole within the armed forces.

In 1972, a series of bombings in Metro Manila occurred. Marcos again blamed the communists, although the only suspects caught were linked to the Philippine Constabulary. The government also claimed that Ninoy Aquino was involved in the plot. The first of these bombings took place on March 15, 1972, and the last took place on September 11, 1972, twelve days before martial law was announced on September 23 of that year. Martial law was put to a vote in the 1973 Philippine martial law referendum, which was marred with controversy resulting in 90.77% support. Marcos

Another alleged false flag attack occurred in 1972, when the government staged an attempted assassination of defense minister Juan Ponce Enrile.

=== Military dictatorship (1972–1981) ===
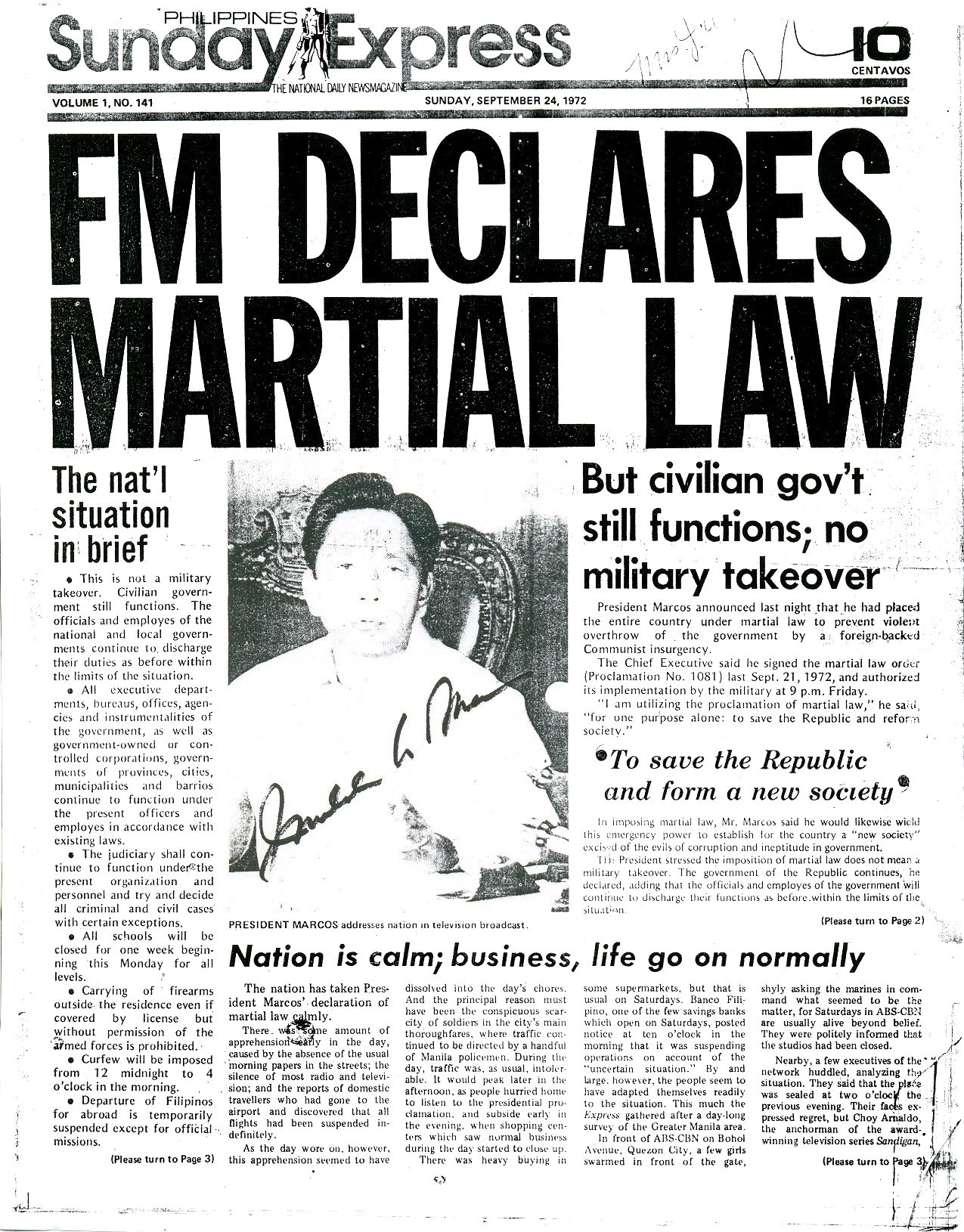
September 24, 1972, issue of the Sunday edition of the Philippine Daily Express

On the evening of September 23, 1972, shortly after the attempted assassination of Enrile, Marcos declared martial law in the Philippines and extended his rule beyond the two-term constitutional limit. Although martial law was formally lifted on January 17, 1981, this marked the beginning of a 14-year period of autocracy lasting until Marcos fled into exile on February 25, 1986. After 1981, Marcos retained virtually all of his constitutional authority until he was ousted. As president of the United States, Richard Nixon approved Marcos's subsequent martial law initiative.

Marcos ruled by decree during this period, inhibiting freedom of the press and other civil liberties, abrogating Congress, and arresting opposition leaders and militant activists, including Ninoy Aquino, Jovito Salonga, and Jose W. Diokno. Most were detained without charges, although Aquino was formally charged with murder, illegal possession of firearms, and subversion alongside leaders of the New People's Army. Eventually, Marcos claimed that martial law was the prelude to creating a bagong lipunan or "new society" based on new social and political values.

The early years of martial law met public approval, as it was believed to have caused crime rates to drop.

==== Bagong Lipunan ====
One of Marcos's rationalizations for martial law stated that there was a need to "reform society" by placing it under the control of a "benevolent dictator" who could guide the undisciplined populace through a period of chaos. He referred to this social engineering exercise as the bagong lipunan, or "new society". His administration produced propaganda materials, including speeches, books, lectures, slogans, and numerous songs to promote it. According to Marcos's own book, titled Notes on the New Society, his movement urged the poor and the privileged to work as one for the common goals of society and to achieve the liberation of the Filipino people through self-realization.

Bagong Lipunan marked the first major restructuring of Philippine education since the Treaty of Paris. It reoriented the teaching of civics and history to entrench constitutional authoritarianism. In addition, it attempted to synchronize the curriculum with the administration's economic strategy of labor exportation. In order to support the new regime, Marcos also established a youth organization, Kabataang Barangay, which was led by Marcos's eldest daughter Imee. Presidential Decree 684, enacted in April 1975, encouraged youths aged 15 to 18 to go to camps and do volunteer work. The Bagong Lipunan was also intensely anti-Chinese. To instill patriotism among Filipino citizens and prevent the growing number of Chinese schools from propagating foreign ideologies, Marcos issued Presidential Decree No. 176, preventing educational institutions from being established exclusively for foreigners or from offering curriculum exclusively for foreigners and restricting Chinese language instruction to not more than 100 minutes per day.

In October 1974, Marcos and PKP-1930 entered into a "national unity agreement", through which PKP-1930 would support certain Bagong Lipunan programs such as land reform, trade union reform, and revitalized relations with the Soviet bloc.

==== Metro Manila Commission ====
In 1975, Marcos issued Presidential Decree No. 824, placing Manila, Quezon City, two other cities, twelve municipalities of Rizal, and Valenzuela in Bulacan under the administration of the Metro Manila Commission (MMC). He appointed his wife, Imelda, as the head of the MMC in 1976; she would serve until her election to the Batasang Pambansa in 1978. The office was the second most powerful in the Philippine Republic, with its jurisdiction covering around 20 percent of the population and 70 percent of the economic output of the Philippines, and its budget was second only to that of the national government. Carlos P. Romulo described Imelda as the "de facto vice president" during this period.

==== Militarism ====
Marcos established a group of key advisors and administrators within the military establishment, known as the Rolex 12. His closest advisors and chief administrators: Enrile, Fidel Ramos, and Fabian Ver were the chief administrators of martial law. Other members included Danding Cojuangco and Lucio Tan.

Between 1972 and 1976, Marcos increased the size of the Philippine military from 65,000 to 270,000 personnel in response to the fall of South Vietnam and other communist victories in the region. Military officers were placed on the corporate boards of the media, public utilities, development projects, and other private corporations. Marcos also supported the growth of a domestic weapons manufacturing industry and increased military spending. Marcos organized the Civilian Home Defense Force to battle communist and Islamic insurgencies. Along with other elements of the Marcos regime, it was accused of inflicting human rights violations on leftists, the NPA, Muslim insurgents, and rebels.

Under martial law, the Communist Party of the Philippines, the NPA, and the National Democratic Front (NDF) grew significantly. Despite Marcos's claims in 1981 that the conflict was "substantially contained", the NPA had established a foothold in urban areas, while the NDF formed relationships with legal opposition organizations. In the early 1980s, key communist leaders in Davao City were killed, leading the administration to claim the Party's "backbone" in the South had broken. However, remaining leaders began a campaign of urban insurrection, which led the international press to label Davao as the "Killing Fields" and the "Murder Capital" of the Philippines. The violence reached its peak in 1985, with 1,282 military and police deaths and 1,362 civilian deaths.

==== Foreign policy ====
By 1977, the armed forces had quadrupled in size, and over 60,000 Filipinos had been arrested for political reasons. He retained the active support of the United States throughout the period of martial law. From 1972 until 1983, the United States government provided $2.5 billion in bilateral military and economic aid to the Marcos regime, and about $5.5 billion was provided by multilateral institutions such as the World Bank.

In June 1975, Marcos visited Beijing and signed a joint communication normalizing relations with the People's Republic of China. Among other things, Marcos endorsed the one China policy. In turn, Chinese premier Zhou Enlai pledged that China would not intervene in the internal affairs of the Philippines nor seek to impose its policies in Asia, a move that isolated the local communist movement that China had financially and militarily supported. The government subsequently captured New People's Army leaders Bernabe Buscayno in 1976 and Jose Maria Sison in 1977.

During the presidency of Jimmy Carter in the United States, Philippines–United States relations soured somewhat when Carter targeted the Philippines in his human rights campaign. Despite this, the Carter administration maintained the policy of military aid to the Marcos regime to retain U.S. military bases and guard American oil supply lines from the Middle East. Carter successfully pressured Marcos to release Ninoy Aquino. A 1979 US Senate report stated that U.S. officials were aware as early as 1973 that Philippine government agents were in the United States to harass Filipino dissidents. In June 1981, two anti-Marcos labor activists were assassinated outside a union hall in Seattle. On at least one occasion, CIA agents blocked FBI investigations of Philippine agents.

==== 1978 parliamentary election and prime ministry ====
In response to international pressure, including from the Carter administration, Marcos announced that the 1978 Philippine parliamentary election would be held on April 7 to elect 166 regional representatives (out of 208) to an interim Batasang Pambansa. Marcos established a new party, the Kilusang Bagong Lipunan (KBL), to support his social reform policies. Aquino and his supporters formed Lakas ng Bayan (LABAN), fielding 21 candidates in the Metro Manila region, including Aquino, Neptali Gonzales, Teofisto Guingona Jr., Ramon Mitra Jr., Nene Pimentel, journalist Napoleon Rama, publisher Alejandro Roces, and poet-playwright Soc Rodrigo. However, LABAN's campaign was restricted, and Marcos refused to allow Aquino out of prison to campaign.

Official results showed the KBL winning 137, while Pusyon Bisaya won 13 seats. LABAN received zero seats. The election was marred by allegations of "pre-stuffed ballot boxes, phony registration, 'flying voters', manipulated election returns, and vote buying." As a result, Marcos became Prime Minister of the Philippines, the first to hold the position since the American occupation. Under Article 9 of the 1973 constitution, Marcos was granted broad executive powers as the official head of government, head of the National Economic Development Authority, and commander-in-chief of the armed forces. All of the powers of the president from the 1935 Constitution were transferred to the prime minister.

Among the candidates elected to the Batasang Pambansa in 1978 was Imelda Marcos, who took a leave of absence as governor of the MMC from February 17 to June 12. During that time, Ferdinand served as acting MMC governor.

==== Energy and heavy industry policy ====
In 1979, Marcos added eleven heavy industrialization projects to his economic agenda, prioritizing the production of aluminum, copper, steel, cement, coconut, phosphatic fertilizer, and paper, as well as energy projects, including the development of petrochemicals, diesel engines, alcogas, and hydroelectric, geothermal, and nuclear power. The Marcos regime ultimately built seventeen hydroelectric and geothermal plants, with the Philippines becoming the world's second largest geothermal producer in 1983.

Although six nuclear power plants were planned, only the Bataan Nuclear Power Plant (BNPP) was completed. Its construction was paused in 1979 following the Three Mile Island accident, and the BNPP was closed shortly after its 1985 completion following the Chernobyl disaster. Safety reviews have revealed over 4,000 defects, and the site lies near Mount Pinatubo and three geological faults. The construction loans used to build BNPP were only paid off in April 2017, and maintenance costs have exceeded ₱40 million per year.

==== Agricultural and food policy ====
The World Bank reported that crops (rice, corn, coconut and sugar), livestock and poultry and fisheries in the Philippines grew at an average rate of 6.8%, 3% and 4.5%, respectively from 1970 to 1980, and while the forestry sector declined by an annual average rate of 4.4% through the 1970s. Marcos's signature agricultural program, Masagana 99, was launched on May 21, 1973, to address a rice shortage. Its goal was to raise yield from 40 to 99 cavans (4.4 tons) per hectare. The program pushed farmers to use high-yield seeds, fertilizer, and herbicides. Initial success came from encouraging farmers to plant IR8, a "miracle rice" funded by the Rockefeller and Ford foundations and the UPLB CAFS through the International Rice Research Institute, which had been under development since 1962. This increased rice production from 3.7 to 7.7 million tons in two decades and made the Philippines a rice exporter for the first time in the 20th century. However, the switch to IR8 required more fertilizers and pesticides, primarily profiting multinationals' agricultural concerns rather than the majority of small, peasant farmers, who often remained in poverty.

=== Third term and ouster (1981–1986) ===
==== End of martial law and 1981 presidential election ====
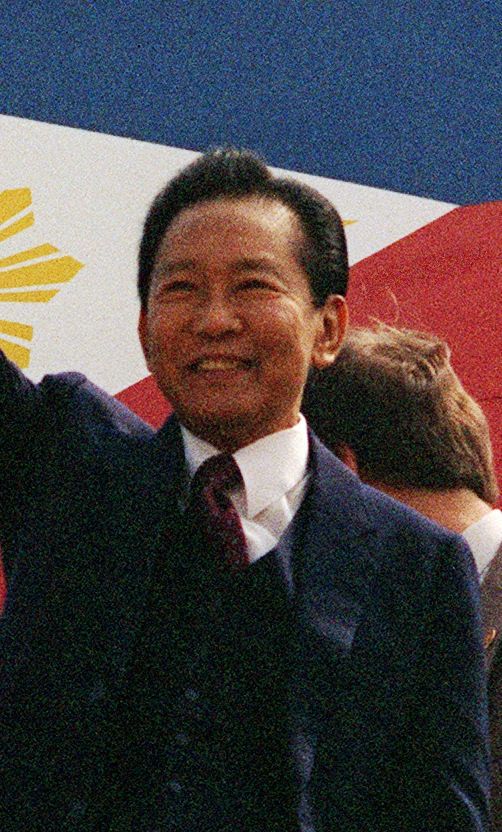
Marcos on a visit to the United States in 1982

On January 17, 1981, Marcos issued Proclamation 2045, lifting martial law without restoring habeas corpus for rebellion and subversion-related crimes. The proclamation was timed to precede a state visit from Pope John Paul II and the presidential inauguration of Ronald Reagan in the United States to minimize international opposition. Marcos scheduled presidential elections and a referendum on barangay elections for June 16, six months after the proclamation. Marcos stood for re-election, but the major opposition parties, led by LABAN, boycotted the election under the banner of the United Nationalist Democratic Organization (UNIDO). He easily defeated token opposition.

Marcos' third inauguration took place on Tuesday, June 30, 1981, at the Quirino Grandstand in Manila. Attendees included Singaporean prime minister Lee Kuan Yew, future Chinese president Yang Shangkun and Thai prime minister Prem Tinsulanonda. American vice president George H. W. Bush also attended and praised Marcos for his "adherence to democratic principles and to the democratic processes". (Note: There is some disagreement between sources about whether President Bush said principle or principles)

==== Economic recession ====
During the martial law period, the Philippine economy continued to expand as it had in the decade prior, fueled by the administration's continued reliance on foreign lending, which allowed it to defy international price shocks as a result of the 1973 and 1979 energy crises. From 1964 to 1982, the gross domestic product of the Philippines grew from $5.27 billion to $37.14 billion, with approximately 9 percent growth in each of 1973 and 1976. However, external debt also grew from $360 million in 1962 to $17.2 billion in 1980. This debt-driven growth left the nation vulnerable. When the United States raised interested rates from 1980 to 1982 in response to high inflation, the Philippine economy went into decline beginning in 1981, producing the worst recession in history by 1985. The economy contracted by 7.3 percent for two consecutive years in 1984 and 1985. Poverty rates reached 49 percent. American economist James K. Boyce has referred to the Philippine economy under Marcos as an example of "immiserizing growth", paradoxically worsening the economy through growth in which the rich get absolutely richer and the poor become absolutely poorer.

In particular, the commercial logging and timber industry, which had accounted for five percent of GDP during the first half of the 1970s. Timber products were a top export. However, in the early 1980s, the forestry industry collapsed because most accessible forests had been depleted. Of 12 million hectares of forest land, about 7 million had been harvested at a rate of 300,000 per year for the prior two decades. In 1981, the Food and Agriculture Organization classified 2 million hectares of Philippine forests "severely degraded and incapable of regeneration".

Economic troubles undermined efforts at a second educational restructuring in 1981.

==== Manila Film Center collapse ====
Construction on the Manila Film Center began in January 1981 at a cost of $25 million. In order to meet the January 1982 deadline ahead of the Manila International Film Festival, four thousand workers were employed to work in around-the-clock shifts. The lobby was constructed in 72 hours by 1,000 workers. A scaffolding collapsed on November 17, 1981, killing multiple workers. Rescuers and ambulances were kept away for 9 hours after the incident. The collapse became an infamous example of the rushed construction and the Marcoses' edifice complex.

==== Ninoy Aquino assassination ====
On August 21, 1983, opposition leader Ninoy Aquino was assassinated on the tarmac at Manila International Airport upon his return to the country after three years in exile in the United States, where he had a heart bypass operation after Marcos allowed him to seek medical care. The opposition primarily accused Marcos of ordering the assassination through Fabian Ver, while others blamed the military, Danding Cojuangco, or Imelda Marcos, who had become more influential since her husband's illness. Ver and other high-ranking military officers were charged with the murder, but they were acquitted in 1985. Their trials were widely judged to be a miscarriage of justice. After Marcos was deposed, a reinvestigation of the assassination led to a conviction of sixteen military personnel for the murder, with the Sandiganbayan ruling that one of the escorts assigned to Aquino, Rogelio Moreno, had fired the fatal shot.

Although government-sanctioned torture declined following the formal end of martial law, killing and disappearances rose after 1981, according to the Task Force Detainees of the Philippines.

==== Attempted impeachment ====
By 1984, Marcos also faced significant public and international scrutiny over the widespread reporting of his family's vast international financial holdings, and United States president Ronald Reagan started distancing himself from the Marcos regime. In August 1985, 56 Assemblymen signed a resolution calling for Marcos to be impeached for allegedly diverting United States aid for personal use, citing a July 1985 San Jose Mercury News exposé. The impeachment filing included in the complaint the misuse and misapplication of funds "for the construction of the Manila Film Center, where X-rated and pornographic films are exhibited, contrary to public morals and Filipino customs and traditions". The effort gained little traction, however, and the committee to which the impeachment resolution was referred did not recommend it. Any momentum for removing Marcos under constitutional processes soon died.

==== 1986 snap election ====
In late 1985, in the face of escalating public discontent and under pressure from foreign allies, Marcos called a snap election with more than a year left in his term. He selected Arturo Tolentino as his running mate. The opposition to Marcos united behind Aquino's widow, Corazon, and her running mate, Salvador Laurel. The religious group Iglesia ni Cristo (INC) endorsed Marcos.

The campaign period lasted 45 days, from December 19, 1985, to February 5, 1986. Due to his ill health, Marcos was only able to campaign in selected key cities, while Aquino was able to campaign intensively and extensively, even going to remote places from the north of the Philippines to the south of the Philippines. On February 4, Marcos declared February 6 and 7 as nationwide public holidays to "give all registered voters fullest opportunity to exercise their right of suffrage."

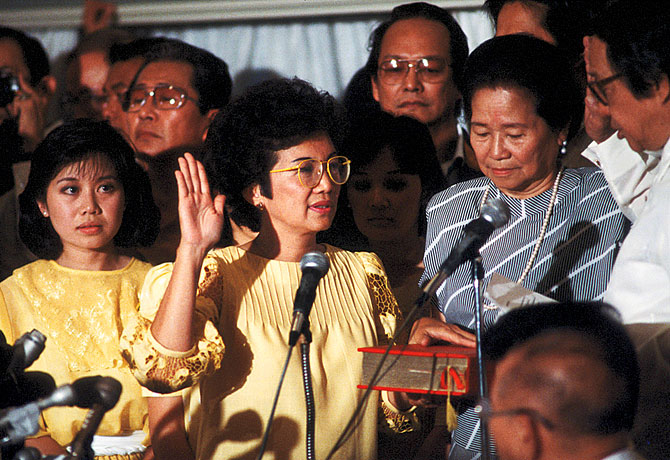
Corazon Aquino, widow of the assassinated opposition leader Benigno Aquino Jr., takes the Oath of Office on February 25, 1986.

The elections were held on February 7, 1986. The official election canvasser, the Commission on Elections (COMELEC), declared Marcos the winner. The final tally of the COMELEC had Marcos winning with 10,807,197 votes against Aquino's 9,291,761 votes. On the other hand, the partial 69% tally of the National Movement for Free Elections (NAMFREL), an accredited poll watcher, had Aquino winning with 7,502,601 votes against Marcos's 6,787,556 votes.

The conduct of the election led to popular belief that the polls were tampered with and the results were fraudulent, and international observers eventually declared that the "election of February 7 was not conducted in a free and fair manner," and that the Batasan "ignored explicit provisions of the Philippine Electoral Code requiring that the tampered or altered election returns be set aside during the final counting process, despite protests by representatives of the opposition party." The observers cited cases of vote-buying, intimidation, snatching of ballot boxes, tampered election returns and the disenfranchisement of thousands of voters.

On February 9, thirty-five computer programmers walked out of the COMELEC's electronic quick count at the Philippine International Convention Center, some fearing for their safety and seeking sanctuary in Baclaran Church. The technicians—whose protest was broadcast live on national television—claimed that the Marcos camp had manipulated the election results.

In the last months of Marcos's administration, the Soviet Union stepped up relations and was the only major country to officially congratulate Marcos on his disputed election victory. Marcos had provided favors to the Soviets such as allowing the banned Philippine Communist Party to visit the Soviet Union for consultations. A UPI article from March 1986 reported, "Diplomats in Moscow believe the Soviet government totally misjudged Marcos' power to control events. They speculate that Moscow considered his control of legal bodies and his readiness to be 'ruthless' would thwart any popular opposition."

==== 1986 aborted Enrile and RAM coup ====
In the aftermath of the election and the revelations of irregularities, Juan Ponce Enrile and the Reform the Armed Forces Movement (RAM) – a cabal of officers of the Armed Forces of the Philippines (AFP) disgruntled by the patronage politics and corruption in the AFP, formed in 1982 – set into motion a coup attempt against Ferdinand and Imelda Marcos. On February 20, RAM approached Corazon Aquino's team to seek their support for the establishment of a planned Junta, but Aquino rejected the offer, seeing it as an attempted power grab by Enrile.

On February 22, the Enrile and RAM plot was discovered, and on realizing that they could not effectively evade Marcos by running into the mountains of Northern Luzon, Enrile decided that he and Ram would make a last stand in Camp Aguinaldo. Enrile then sought the support of Philippine Constabulary Chief Fidel Ramos, who held Camp Crame across the street, and Ramos decided to side with Enrile against the Marcoses.

==== Civil disobedience campaign and People Power Revolution ====
Responding to the assertions of cheating, Corazon Aquino disputed the COMELEC results and launched a civil disobedience campaign consisting of a series of rallies and a boycott of Marcos crony companies, announcing the launch of the campaign in front of two million people at her "Tagumpay ng Bayan" (People's Victory) rally at Luneta Park on February 16, 1986.

Corazon Aquino was in Cebu organizing a second major rally when the RAM coup was discovered. Ninoy Aquino's brother Butz immediately organized support for Ramos and Enrile, as did Manila Archbishop Jaime Sin shortly thereafter. On the evening of February 22, they urged people to form a human barricade around Camps Aguinaldo and Crame, and people began to flock to the Efipanio de Los Santos Avenue (EDSA) in between the camps in response. Many of these were Corazon Aquino supprters who were already preparing for the next round of rallies in the civil disobedience campaign. Corazon Aquino flew to Manila and added her support, eventually addressing the crowds on the afternoon of February 24.

At 9 in the morning of February 24, Marcos had gone on television and announced he was lifting the "maximum tolerance" policy against Enrile and Ramos' forces, but showed himself on air refusing Fabian Ver's request to fire upon the camps. At the same time, General Josephus Ramas conveyed orders from the President for the Philippine Marines to fire, despite the fact that civilians would be killed in such an attack. Colonel Braulio Balbas of the Fourth Marine brigade refused the order, and did so again twenty minutes later when told that "The President is on the other line waiting for compliance!" Balbas' refusal on the Morning of February is considered the point when Marcos lost control of the Philippine Marines.

Commodore Tagumpay Jardiniano, who was chief of the Naval Defense Force also changed sides on that morning, as had the 15th Strike Wing of the Philippine Air Force. Consular officials had begun rejecting Marcos' claims of victory as early as February 22, beginning with the Consuls in London, Honolulu, Los Angeles and by February 25 the list included the Philippine Embassies in Washington DC and Moscow.

Both Marcos and Aquino now claimed that they had won the election, and thus on February 25, 1986, rival presidential inaugurations were held.

The Reagan administration, which had supported Marcos up to that point, finally withdrew its support for Marcos, and he was eventually forced to flee.

== Human rights abuses ==
The Marcos regime committed documented human rights abuses against a long list of opponents, particularly after the institution of martial law in 1972. These included student activists, farmers, journalists, legal political opponents, and priests and nuns. Victims were commonly accused of supporting communist rebels or other leftists or of joining or sympathizing with insurrectionist groups, including the Communist Party, NPA, or Moro National Liberation Front. Many were rounded up without an arrest warrant and indefinitely detained without charge. According to Rappler, others were arrested under color of law through Arrest Search and Seizure Orders (ASSO), which permitted the military or police to detain citizens.

Victims were often taken to safehouses where they were tortured, often blindfolded. According to activist and abductee Edgar Jopson, "Safehouses usually have their windows always shut tight. They are usually covered with high walls. One would usually detect [safehouses] through the traffic of motorcycles and cars going in and out of the house at irregular hours. Burly men, armed with pistols tucked in their waists or in clutch bags, usually drive these vehicles."

In many cases, victims were summarily executed, and mutilated remains were dumped along roadsides to instill fear and intimidate opponents. In many cases, opponents of the regime suddenly went missing, without a trace, and their bodies were never recovered. Prominent persons executed or disappeared by the regime included Liliosa Hilao, Archimedes Trajano, Juan Escandor, both Primitivo Mijares and his son Boyet, Tish Pascual-Ladlad, Hermon Lagman, Rizalina Ilagan, Jessica Sales, Carlos Tayag, Christina Catalla, NPA commander Alex Boncayao, Macli-ing Dulag, Tulio Favali, Liliosa Hilao, Evelio Javier, and Emmanuel Lacaba.

In 1976, Amnesty International identified 88 government torturers, including members of the Constabulary and the Army. According to journalist Rigoberto Tiglao, nearly all abuses were committed by Philippine Constabulary units, especially its Security Units, which reported directly to Fidel Ramos.

=== Estimates ===
It is difficult to develop a precise accounting of the abuses under the Marcos regime due to heavy press censorship at the time.

Estimates of the scale and scope of the human rights abuses under the Marcos regime vary, but estimates generally include approximately 1,500 to 4,000 documented extrajudicial killings or disappearances through targeted assassination or massacres, in addition to the thousands killed in the Moro conflict. Tens of thousands more were imprisoned or tortured for political reasons. In addition, ten thousand Muslims were killed in the Moro conflict by the army, constabulary, and paramilitary groups, many in massacres.

=== Denial by the Marcos family and allies ===
Members of the Marcos family deny any responsibility for human rights violations. Bongbong Marcos has described claims of human rights abuses as "self-serving statements by politicians, self-aggrandizement narratives, pompous declarations, and political posturing and propaganda."

Imee called the allegations political accusations. According to her, "If what is demanded is an admission of guilt, I don't think that's possible. Why would we admit to something we did not do?"

=== Civilian massacres ===
Civilian massacres
Location	Date	Group	Perpetrator	Casualties
Guinayangan, Quezon	February 1, 1981	3,000 coconut farmers protesting the coco levy fund scam	Philippine military	2 dead and 27 wounded
Tudela, Misamis Occidental	August 24, 1981	The Gumapons Subanon family	Paramilitary members of the "Rock Christ", a fanatical pseudo-religious sect	10 killed
Las Navas, Northern Samar	September 15, 1981	Sag-od massacre	18 armed security men of the San Jose Timber Corp. (owned by Enrile) who were also members of the Special Forces of the Civilian Home Defense Force (CHDF) and allied with the Lost Command (a paramilitary group pursuing insurgents)	45 dead
Culasi, Antique	December 19, 1981	400+ protestors against the Philippine Constabulary and the taxes cuts	Philippine military	5 dead and several injured
Talugtug, Nueva Ecija	January 3, 1982	alleged communists	Philippine military	5 dead
Dumingag, Zamboanga del Sur	February 12, 1982	alleged NPA members	Ilaga	12 dead
Hinunangan, Southern Leyte	March 23, 1982	Masaymon barrio	357th Philippine Constabulary company	8 dead
Bayog, Zamboanga del Sur	May 25, 1982	Barangay Dimalinao	Airplanes bombed the community because communist rebels killed 23 soldiers two days earlier.	5 dead, 8 injured
Daet, Camarines Norte	June 14, 1982	protestors denouncing "fake elections" and Cocofed and demanding increased copra prices	Philippine military	6 dead, 50+ injured
Pulilan, Bulacan	June 21, 1982	Peasant organizers	175th Philippine Constabulary company	5 dead
Labo, Camarines Norte	June 23, 1982	Unidentified men	45th Infantry, Mabilo detachment	5 dead.
Roxas, Zamboanga del Norte		family members	Philippine military	8 dead
Gapan, Nueva Ecija		Bautista family	unidentified men in camouflaged uniforms	5 dead
Escalante, Negros Occidental	September 20, 1985	Escalante massacre 5000 farmers, students, fisherfolk, and religious clergy	50 firemen, Regional Special Action Forces (RSAF) and Civilian Home Defense Force (CHDF)	20-30 dead and 30 wounded

=== Massacres during the Moro conflict ===
Known massacres of Moros
Name	Date	Perpetrator	Casualties
Jabidah massacre	March 1968	Philippine military	11 to 68 killed
21 militia massacres	1970–71	pro-government militias, such as the Ilaga	518 dead, 184 injured and 243 houses burned down
Tacub massacre	October 24, 1971	Philippine military	dozens dead
Manili massacre	June 19, 1971	suspected Ilaga and Philippine Constabulary	70-79 dead
Burning of Jolo, Sulu	February 7–8, 1974	Philippine military	1,000-20,000 dead
Palimbang massacre	September 24, 1974	Philippine Constabulary	1,500 dead, 3,000 women and children detained, and about 300 women raped
Pata Island massacre	1981–82	Philippine military	3,000 Tausug civilians, including women and children, dead
Tong Umapoy massacre	1983	Philippine navy	57 dead

== Exile (1986–1989) ==
=== Flight to Hawaii ===
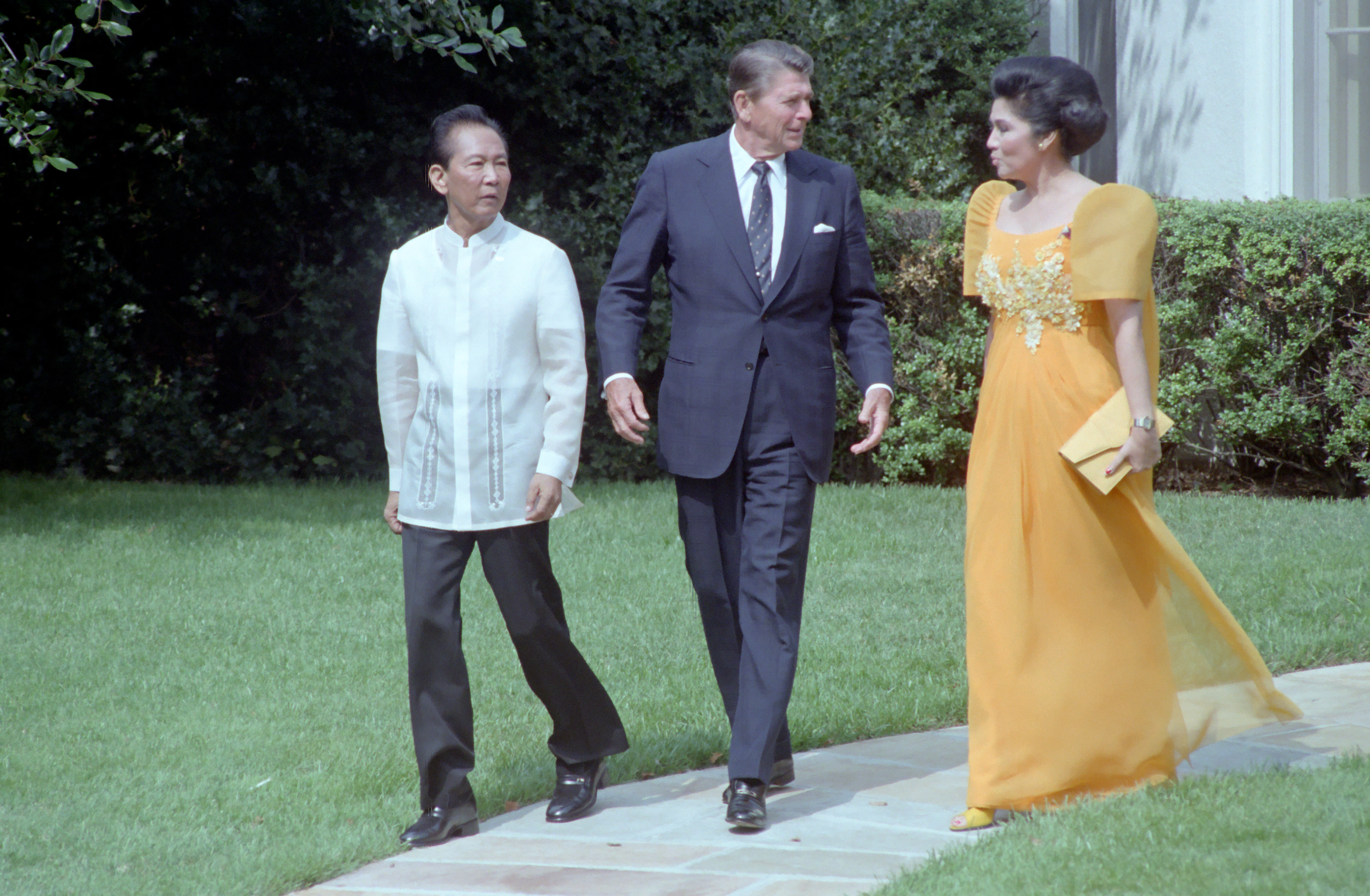
Ferdinand and Imelda Marcos at the White House with US president Ronald Reagan in 1982

At 15:00 PST (GMT+8) on February 25, 1986, Marcos talked to United States Senator Paul Laxalt, a close associate of President Reagan, asking for advice. Laxalt advised him to "cut and cut cleanly", to which Marcos expressed his disappointment. In the afternoon, Marcos talked to Enrile, asking for safe passage for him and his family, including close allies such as General Ver. Finally, at 9:00 p.m., the Marcos family was transported by four Sikorsky HH-3E helicopters to Clark Air Base in Angeles City, about 83 kilometers north of Manila, before boarding US Air Force C-130 planes bound for Andersen Air Force Base in Guam and finally to Hickam Air Force Base in Hawaii, where Marcos arrived on February 26. He also brought with him 22 crates of cash valued at $717 million, 300 crates of assorted jewelry, $4 million worth of unset precious gems, 65 Seiko and Cartier watches, a 12 by 4 ft box full of pearls, a 3 ft solid gold statue covered in diamonds and other precious stones, $200,000 in gold bullion, nearly $1 million in Philippine pesos, and deposit slips to banks in the United States, Switzerland, and the Cayman Islands worth $124 million. His mother, Josefa, was left in Malacañang Palace. She died in 1988.

Initially, there was confusion in Washington as to what to do with Marcos and the 90 members of his entourage. Given the special relations Marcos nurtured with Reagan, the former had expectations of favorable treatment. However, Reagan kept his distance. The State Department in turn assigned former deputy chief of mission to Manila, Robert G. Rich Jr., to be the point of contact. The entourage was first billeted inside the housing facilities of Hickam Air Force Base. The State Department announced the Marcoses were not immune from legal charges, and within weeks hundreds of cases had been filed against them.

Throughout his stay in Hawaii, he and his family enjoyed a high life, living in a luxurious house in Makiki Heights, as Imelda entertained guests at parties, while Filipinos back in the Philippines suffered under the debt Marcos incurred.

When protestors stormed Malacañang Palace shortly after their departure, it was notoriously discovered that Imelda had left behind over 2,700 pairs of shoes. The protesters looted and vandalized the palace; many stole documents, jewelry, food, typewriters, etc.

The Catholic hierarchy and Manila's middle class were crucial to the success of the revolution. Contrary to the widely held notion that the protests were limited to Manila, protests against Marcos also occurred in the provinces and on the islands of Visayas and Mindanao.

=== Plans to return and "The Marcos Tapes" ===
More than a year after the revolution, it was revealed to the United States House Foreign Affairs subcommittee in 1987 that Marcos held an intention to return to the Philippines and overthrow the Aquino government. American attorney Richard Hirschfeld and business consultant Robert Chastain, both of whom posed as arms dealers, gained knowledge of a plot by gaining Marcos's trust and secretly recorded their conversations with the ousted leader.

According to Hirschfeld, he was first invited by Marcos to a party held at the latter's family residence in Honolulu. After hearing that one of Hirschfeld's clients was Saudi Sheikh Mohammad Fassi, Marcos's interest was piqued because he had done business with Saudis in the past. A few weeks later, Marcos asked for help with securing a passport from another country in order to travel to the Philippines while bypassing travel restrictions imposed by the Philippines and United States governments. This failed, however, and subsequently Marcos asked Hirschfeld to arrange a $10-million loan from Fassi.

On January 12, 1987, Marcos stated to Hirschfeld that he required another $5 million loan "in order to pay 10,000 soldiers $500 each as a form of 'combat life insurance.'" When asked by Hirschfeld if he was talking about an invasion of the Philippines, Marcos responded, "Yes". Hirschfeld stated that Marcos said that he was negotiating with several arms dealers to purchase up to $18 million worth of weapons, including tanks and heat-seeking missiles, and enough ammunition to "last an army three months".

Marcos had thought of flying to his hometown in Ilocos Norte and initiating a plot to kidnap Corazon Aquino. "What I would like to see happen is we take her hostage," Marcos told Chastain. "Not to hurt her ... no reason to hurt her ... to take her."

Learning of this plan, Hirschfeld contacted the US Department of Justice and was asked for further evidence. This information eventually reached President Ronald Reagan, who placed Marcos under "island arrest", further limiting his movement.

=== Legal cases ===
Within two weeks of his arrival to the United States, hundreds of criminal and civil cases against the Marcos clique were filed in Hawaii, San Francisco, and New York. Marcos made personal appeals to Reagan to put a stop to these cases. In June 1988 National Security Advisor Colin Powell recommended proceeding with indictments of the Marcoses as he reviewed the cases as forwarded by United States Attorney for the Southern District of New York Rudy Giuliani. Reagan tacitly approved. On August 4, Marcos stated that he had head of state immunity to resist subpoenas by a federal grand jury to produce his finger and palm prints and failed to consent to investigators to review his bank accounts. By August 18, a bench warrant of arrest was issued against the Marcoses. By October of that year, Reagan personally wrote to Marcos, informing him that he believed in his innocence of the charges against him but reminding him that the case was out of his hands. He assured him that they would have every opportunity to prove their innocence.

Giuliani pressed for indicting the Marcoses for violating the Racketeer Influenced and Corrupt Organizations Act (RICO). The RICO Act focuses specifically on racketeering and allows the leaders of a syndicate to be tried for the crimes they ordered others to do or assisted them in doing. For example, before RICO, a person who instructed someone else to murder could be exempt from prosecution because they did not personally commit the crime. In his next letter to President Reagan on October 20, Marcos complained that Giuliani was giving them nothing but an ultimatum to plead guilty and even to testify against others, including his own family.

== Personal life ==
=== Marriages and children ===
Marcos lived with a common-law wife, Carmen Ortega, an Ilocana mestiza who was the 1949 Miss Press Photography. They had three children and resided for about two years at 204 Ortega Street in San Juan. In August 1953, their engagement was announced in Manila dailies. Not much is known about what happened to Ortega and their children.

Marcos, who was baptized and raised into the Philippine Independent Church, subsequently converted to Catholicism in later life to marry Imelda Trinidad Romualdez. They married on April 17, 1954, 11 days after they first met. They had three biological children: Imee, Bongbong, and Irene Marcos. Marcos's fourth child with Ortega was born after his marriage to Imelda. Marcos and Imelda later adopted a daughter, Aimee.

=== Extramarital affairs ===
Marcos had an affair with American actress Dovie Beams from 1968 to 1970. According to reports by the Sydney Morning Herald, Marcos also had an affair with former Playboy model Evelin Hegyesi around 1970 and sired a child with her, Analisa Josefa.

== Death and burial ==
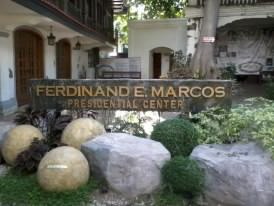
The body of Marcos was stored in a refrigerated crypt at the Ferdinand E. Marcos Presidential Center in Batac, Ilocos Norte until 2016.

Marcos was admitted to the hospital on January 15, 1989, with pneumonia and underwent a series of operations. In his dying days, Marcos was visited by Vice President Salvador Laurel. During the visit, Marcos offered to return 90% of his ill-gotten wealth to the Filipino people in exchange for a burial in the Philippines besides his mother, an offer also disclosed to Enrique Zobel. However, Marcos's offer was rebuffed by the Aquino government and by Imelda.

Marcos died at St. Francis Medical Center in Honolulu at 12:40 a.m. (HST) on September 28, 1989, of kidney, heart, and lung ailments, 17 days after his 72nd birthday. Moments after, the younger Ferdinand eulogised his late father by stating, "Hopefully friends and detractors alike will look beyond the man to see what he stood for: his vision, his compassion, and his total love of country."

Marcos was interred in a private mausoleum at Byodo-In Temple on the island of Oahu.

According to Roberto Ongpin, Marcos had two kidney transplants. The first one came from his son Bongbong but was rejected by his body. Several years later, soldier in the presidential security group who was from his Batac hometown in Ilocos Norte was the donor. The organ kept him alive until he died.

The Aquino government initially refused to allow Marcos's body to be brought back to the Philippines, which ultimately happened four years later.

From 1993 to 2016, Marcos's remains were interred inside a refrigerated, frozen crypt in Batac, Ilocos Norte, where his son, Ferdinand Jr., and eldest daughter, Imee, became the local governor and congressional representative, respectively.

A large bust of Ferdinand Marcos (inspired by Mount Rushmore) was commissioned by the tourism minister, Jose Aspiras, and carved into a hillside in Benguet. It was subsequently destroyed, allegedly by left-wing activists, members of a local tribe who had been displaced by construction of the monument, and looters hunting for the legendary Yamashita treasure.

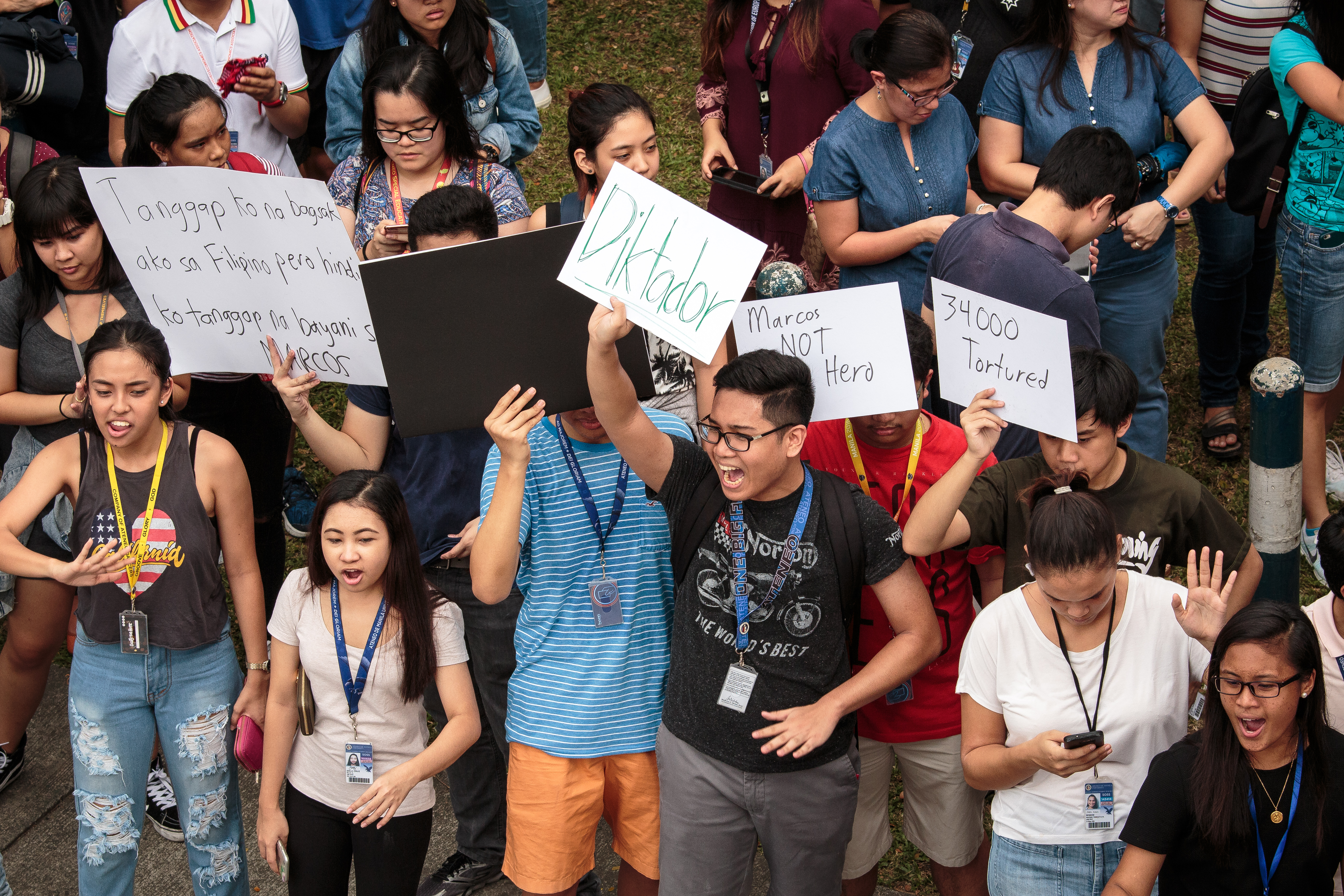
Students of the Ateneo de Manila University protesting the burial of Marcos

On November 18, 2016, his remains were reburied at the Libingan ng mga Bayani, ordered by President Rodrigo Duterte despite opposition from various groups. On the morning of November 18, using Philippine Armed Forces helicopters, his family and their supporters flew his remains from Ilocos to Manila for a private burial. This account was challenged, and the physical location of his remains is disputed. Various groups protested the burial.

== Posthumous lawsuits ==
=== Roxas v. Marcos ===
Rogelio Roxas, a Filipino treasure hunter, discovered a 3-foot-tall golden Buddha statue in tunnels under the Baguio General Hospital in 1971. Roxas was later arrested and tortured by members of the military, and the statue was taken away. Upon the exile of the Marcoses, Roxas assigned his rights to a friend in the United States and formed the Golden Buddha Corporation (GBC), which pursued the case against the former president. In 1996, the lower court awarded US$22 billion in favor of GBC, the largest sum in a civil case in the history of the United States. In November 1998, the Hawaii Supreme Court overturned the ruling but maintained an award of US$6 million for the illegal arrest and torture experienced by Roxas.

=== Sandiganbayan, Supreme Court, and international trials ===
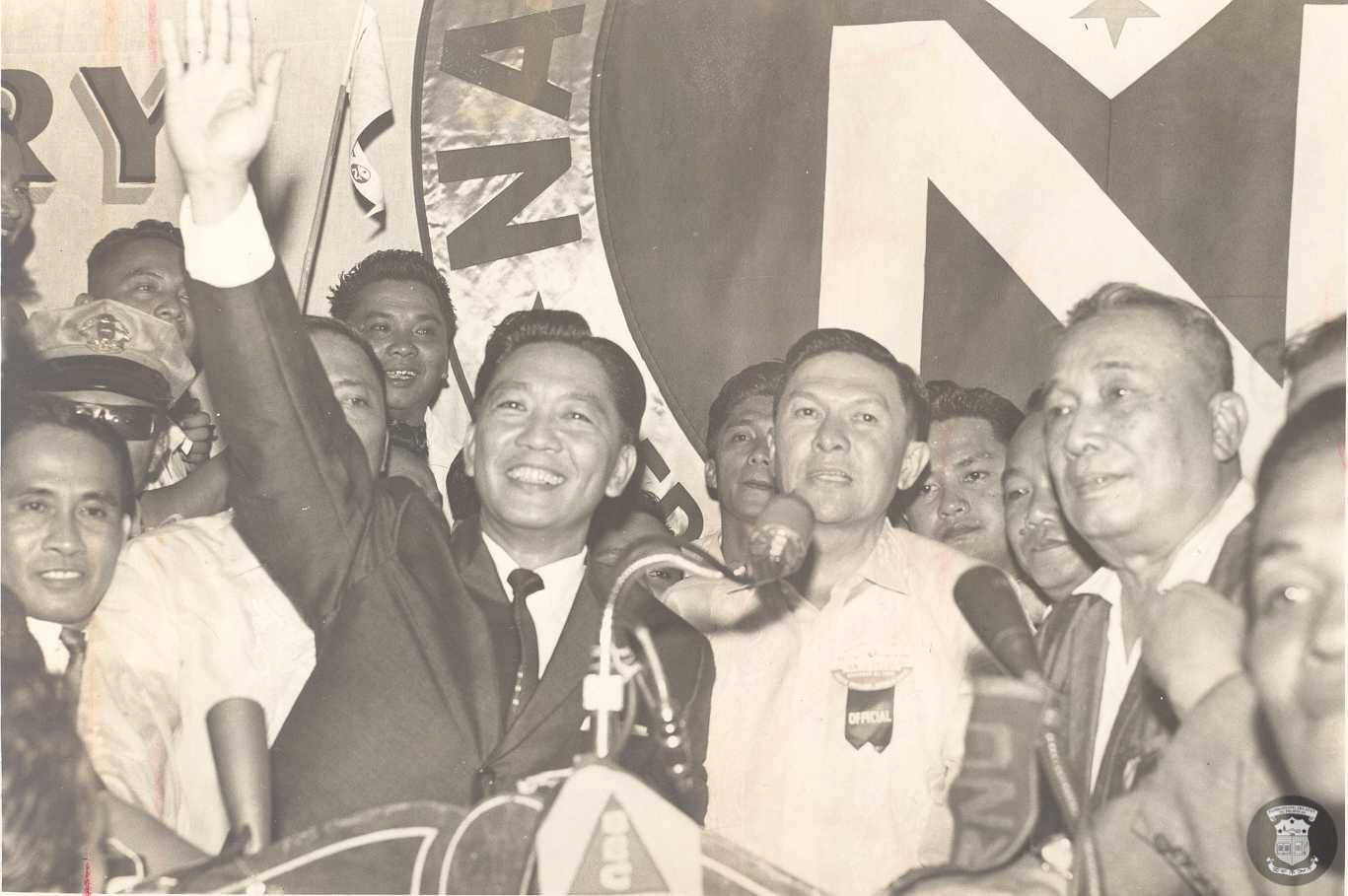
Ferdinand Marcos with Emmanuel Pelaez

On November 9, 2018, Imelda Marcos was found "guilty beyond reasonable doubt" by the Sandiganbayan of seven counts of graft for private organizations set up in Switzerland during her time as a government official from 1968 to 1986. In less than 20 days, however, the Sandiganbayan listed Imelda's "advanced age" and health condition as considerations for allowing the accused to post bail. The Fifth Division's (of the Sandiganbayan) ruling read that "the fact that she is of advanced age and for health reasons, consistent with the doctrine in Enrile vs. Sandiganbayan, bail is allowed for these seven cases." The Supreme Court of the Philippines affirmed that the family's assets, beyond their government salaries, are considered ill-gotten wealth. In 1998 the Court acquitted Imelda Marcos of corruption charges from a previous graft conviction in 1993.

The US Ninth Circuit Court of Appeals confirmed a contempt judgement in relation to the assets of Imelda and her son Bongbong. Although on a different matter, this judgement awarded $353.6 million to human rights victims, which was arguably the largest contempt award ever affirmed by an appellate court.

=== Wealth and reparations ===
From 1989 to 1996, a series of civil suits were filed against Marcos and his daughter Imee, alleging that they bore responsibility for executions, torture, and disappearances under his regime. A jury award for US$2 billion was overturned on June 12, 2008, by the Supreme Court of the United States in Republic of Philippines v. Pimentel. The Court ruled 7–2 that

In 1995, some 10,000 Filipinos won a US class-action lawsuit filed against the Marcos estate. The claims were filed by victims or their surviving relatives consequent to torture, execution, and disappearances.

The Swiss government, initially reluctant to respond to allegations that stolen funds were held in Swiss accounts, returned $684 million of Marcos' holdings.

Corazon Aquino repealed many of the repressive laws enacted during Marcos's dictatorship. She restored the right of habeas corpus, repealed anti-labor laws, and freed hundreds of political prisoners.

From 1989 to 1996, a series of suits were brought before US courts against Marcos and his daughter Imee, alleging that they bore responsibility for executions, torture, and disappearances. A jury in the Ninth Circuit Court awarded US$2 billion to the plaintiffs and to a class composed of human rights victims and their families. On June 12, 2008, in Republic of Philippines v. Pimentel, the US Supreme Court ruled 7–2 that "The judgment of the Court of Appeals for the Ninth Circuit is reversed, and the case is remanded with instructions to order the District Court to dismiss the interpleader action." The court dismissed the interpleader lawsuit filed to determine the rights of 9,500 Filipino human rights victims (1972–1986) to recover US$35 million, part of a US$2 billion judgment in US courts against the Marcos estate, because the Philippine government is an indispensable party, protected by sovereign immunity. The Philippine government claimed ownership of the funds transferred by Marcos in 1972 to Arelma S.A., which invested the money with Merrill Lynch, Pierce, Fenner & Smith Inc. in New York. In July 2017, the Philippine Court of Appeals rejected the petition seeking to enforce the United States court decision.

In 2013, Philippine Congress passed Republic Act 10368 or the Human Rights Victims Reparation and Recognition Act of 2013. The law created the Human Rights Violations Claims Board and provided reparations to victims of summary execution, torture, enforced disappearances, and other human rights violations. Compensation came from P10 billion of stolen wealth seized by the government from the Marcoses. A total of 11,103 victims received compensation in 2018. A bill filed in Congress in 2020 proposed to compensate tens of thousands of people still not officially recognized as victims of state-sponsored violence.

In 2012, the Philippine Supreme Court ruled all Marcos assets beyond legally declared earnings/salary to be ill-gotten wealth and such wealth to have been forfeited to the government or human rights victims.

According to the Presidential Commission on Good Government (PCOG), the Marcos family and their cronies looted so much wealth from the Philippines that investigators have not determined precisely how many billions were stolen. PCOG estimated that Marcos stole around $5 billion to $10 billion while earning an annual salary equivalent to US$13,500.

Among the sources of the Marcos wealth are alleged to be diverted foreign aid, military aid (including to Marcos for sending Filipino troops to Vietnam), and kickbacks from public works contracts.

In 1990, Imelda Marcos was acquitted of charges that she raided the Philippine treasury by a US jury. She was acquitted because the jury deemed that the US did not have jurisdiction. In 1993, she was convicted of graft in Manila for entering into three unfavourable lease contracts between a government-run transportation agency and another government-run hospital. In 1998, the Philippine Supreme Court overturned her conviction. In 2008, Philippine trial court judge Silvino Pampilo acquitted Imelda of 32 counts of illegal money transfer from the 1993 graft conviction. In 2010, she was ordered to repay the Philippine government almost $280,000 for funds taken in 1983. In 2012, a US Court of Appeals of the Ninth Circuit upheld a contempt judgement against Imelda and Bongbong for violating an injunction barring them from dissipating their assets and awarded $353.6 million to human rights victims. As of October 2015, she faced 10 graft charges and 25 civil cases, down from 900 in the 1990s, as most cases were dismissed for lack of evidence.

In the 2004 Global Corruption Report, Marcos appeared in the list of the world's most corrupt leaders, behind Suharto. One of Marcos's former ministers of industry, Vicente Paterno, noted that while the amount stolen by Marcos's regime probably fell short of Suharto's, Marcos invested outside the Philippines, whereas Suharto mostly invested at home.

The International Consortium of Investigative Journalists' (ICIJ) exposé of offshore leaks accused Imee of hiding wealth in tax havens in the British Virgin Islands.

In 2014, Imelda's former secretary Vilma Bautista was sentenced to prison for conspiring to sell a Monet, Sisley, and other masterpieces.

On May 9, 2016, ICIJ released the Panama Papers. Imee and Irene were named, along with grandsons Fernando Manotoc, Matthew Joseph Manotoc; and Ferdinand Richard Manotoc, his son-in-law Gregorio Maria Araneta III; including his son-in-law Tommy Manotoc's relatives Ricardo Gabriel Manotoc and Teodoro Kalaw Manotoc.

On September 3, 2017, then-President Rodrigo Duterte said the Marcos family was ready to transfer their wealth to the government. In January 2018, a draft House Bill proposing a settlement and immunity for the Marcoses was received by the Duterte government in July 2017.

== Publications ==
Marcos published various books during his term from 1970 to 1983, and a final offering was published posthumously in 1990. Apparently these books were written by ghostwriters, notably Adrian Cristobal.

- National Discipline: the Key to Our Future (1970)
- Today's Revolution: Democracy (1971)
- Notes on the New Society of the Philippines (1973)
- Tadhana: the History of the Filipino People (1977, 1982)
- The Democratic Revolution in the Philippines (1977)
- Five Years of the New Society (1978)
- President Ferdinand E. Marcos on law, development and human rights (1978)
- President Ferdinand E. Marcos on agrarian reform (1979)
- An Ideology for Filipinos (1980)
- An Introduction to the Politics of Transition (1980)
- Marcos's Notes for the Cancun Summit, 1981 (1981)
- Progress and Martial Law (1981)
- The New Philippine Republic: A Third World Approach to Democracy (1982)
- Toward a New Partnership: The Filipino Ideology (1983)
- A Trilogy on the Transformation of Philippine Society (1990)

== Recognition ==
Marcos portrayed in a Philippine 2017 stamp

- Chief Commander of the Philippine Legion of Honor (September 11, 1972)
- Man of the Year 1965, Philippine Free Press (January 1, 1966)
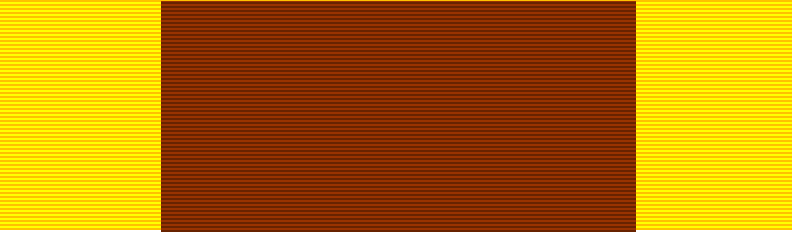
- Knight Grand Cross of Rizal of the Order of the Knights of Rizal.
- Gabon: Grand Cross of the Order of the Equatorial Star
- Japan: Grand Cordon of the Supreme Order of the Chrysanthemum (September 20, 1966)
- Romania: Order of the Star of the Romanian Socialist Republic (April 9, 1975)
- Singapore: First Class (Honorary) of the Order of Temasek (January 15, 1974)
- Spain:
  - Knight of the Collar of the Order of Isabella the Catholic (December 22, 1969)
  - Grand Cross of the Order of Military Merit
- Thailand: Knight of the Most Auspicious Order of the Rajamitrabhorn (January 15, 1968)
- Indonesia: First Class (Adipurna) of the Star of the Republic of Indonesia (January 12, 1968)
- Marcos and Imelda were jointly credited in 1989 by Guinness World Records with the largest-ever theft from a government (an estimated 5 billion to 10 billion US dollars), a record that remained unbroken as of 2022.

== Electoral history ==
Electoral history of Ferdinand Marcos
Year	Office	Party	Votes received				Result
Year	Office	Party	Total	%	P.	Swing	Result
1949	Representative (Ilocos Norte–2nd)	Liberal	—N/a	—N/a	1st	—N/a	Won
1953	Representative (Ilocos Norte–2nd)	Liberal	—N/a	—N/a	1st	—N/a	Won
1957	Representative (Ilocos Norte–2nd)	Liberal	—N/a	—N/a	1st	—N/a	Won
1959	Senator of the Philippines	Liberal	2,661,153	41.62%	1st	—N/a	Won
1965	President of the Philippines	Nacionalista	3,861,324	51.94%	1st	—N/a	Won
1969	President of the Philippines	Nacionalista	5,017,343	62.24%	1st	+10.30	Won
1981	President of the Philippines	KBL	18,309,360	88.02%	1st	+25.78	Won
1986	President of the Philippines	KBL	7,376,599 (NAMFREL)	48.26%	2nd	-39.76	Disputed
1986	President of the Philippines	KBL	10,807,197 (COMELEC)	53.62%	1st	-34.40	Disputed

== See also ==
- Bantayog ng mga Bayani
- Conjugal dictatorship
- Corruption in the Philippines
- Economic history of the Philippines (1965–1986)
- Ferdinand Marcos's cult of personality
- Kleptocracy
- Rolex 12
- List of films about martial law under Ferdinand Marcos
- List of South East Asian people by net worth
- Marcos loyalism

== Notes ==
House of Representatives of the Philippines
Preceded by Pedro Albano	Member of the House of Representatives from Ilocos Norte's 2nd district 1949–1959	Succeeded by Simeon Valdez
Senate of the Philippines
Preceded by Eulogio Rodriguez	President of the Senate of the Philippines; 1963–1965	Succeeded by Arturo Tolentino
Political offices
Preceded by Diosdado Macapagal	President of the Philippines; 1965–1986	Succeeded by Corazon Aquino
New title	Presiding Officer of the Legislative Advisory Council; 1976–1978	Position abolished
Preceded by Jorge B. Vargas (Ministries involved)	Prime Minister of the Philippines; 1978–1981	Succeeded by Cesar Virata
Party political offices
Preceded by Diosdado Macapagal	President of the Liberal Party; 1961–1964	Succeeded by Cornelio Villareal
Preceded by Carlos P. Garcia	Nacionalista Party nominee for President of the Philippines; 1965, 1969	Succeeded by Alejo Santos
First	Kilusang Bagong Lipunan nominee for President of the Philippines; 1981, 1986	Succeeded by Imelda Marcos
