= Forbidden Memory =

2016 documentary film by Gutierrez Mangansakan II

- Directed by: Gutierrez Mangansakan II
- Written by: Gutierrez Mangansakan II
- Produced by: Gutierrez Mangansakan II
- Cinematography: McRobert Nacario
- Edited by: Dempster Samarista
- Distributed by: Cinema One
- Release date: November 18, 2016 (Cinema One Originals)
- Country: Philippines
- Language: Filipino

Forbidden Memory is a 2016 Filipino documentary film that studies a people's collective memory and the policy of genocide around the events that led to the Malisbong Massacre of 1974. Written, produced, and directed by Gutierrez "Teng" Mangansakan II, the film premiered on November 18, 2016, during the 12th Cinema One Originals festival.

== Background and synopsis ==
The documentary revolves around a group of people's collective memory of the September 1974 Malisbong Massacre that was part of the overall counter-insurgency effort of Ferdinand Marcos during the Marcos martial law era. Not known to the majority of the Filipinos, at least 1,500 Moro residents of the coastal barangay of Malisbong in Palimbang, Sultan Kudarat were killed in the massacre. The film “summons remembrances and memories of the fateful days in September 1974 when about 1,000 men from Malisbong and neighboring villages in Palimbang, Sultan Kudarat province, were killed while 3,000 women and children were forcibly taken to naval boats stationed nearby where they encountered unspeakable horror. The genocide and atrocities were perpetrated under the dark years of the Martial Law regime of Ferdinand Marcos.”

== Release ==
The movie had its premiere in the Cinema One Originals festival that ran from November 14–22, 2016. It was marketed in film posters with the slogan "The Greatest Marcos Horror Story Never Told".

== Awards ==
The film won the "Best Documentary" award in the 12th edition of Cinema One Originals, the annual film festival sponsored by Cinema One.
