= Delfin Castro =

Delfin C. Castro
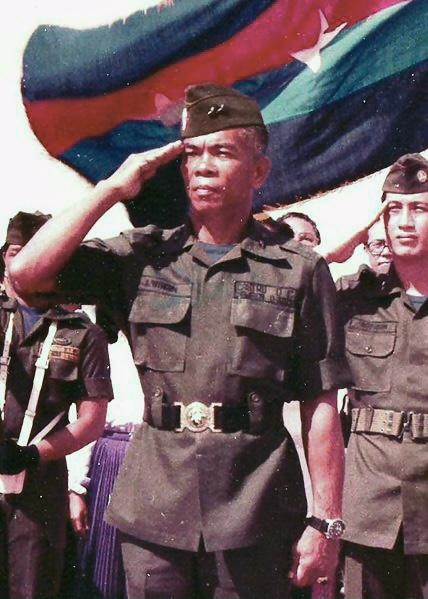
- Major General Delfin C. Castro
- Born: July 30, 1925; Norzagaray, Bulacan, Philippine Islands
- Died: February 5, 2020 (aged 94)
- Military career
- Allegiance: Philippines
- Branch: Armed Forces of the Philippines; Philippine Army; Philippine Constabulary
- Service years: 1951–1986
- Rank: Major General
- Commands: SOUTHCOM AFP; CEMCOM AFP
- Conflicts: Communist rebellion in the Philippines; Islamic insurgency in the Philippines; Vietnam War; Korean War
- Other work: Author, A Mindanao Story: Troubled Decades in the Eye of the Storm

Delfin C. Castro (July 30, 1925 – February 5, 2020) was a major general of the Armed Forces of the Philippines. He was the commander of the AFP Southern Command (SOUTHCOM), from 1981 to 1986. Notable incidents during his tenure include the Pata Island massacre, the assassination of Zamboanga City Mayor Cesar Climaco, the rescue of kidnapped Bishop Federico O. Escaler from Muslim rebels and the strafing of the Japanese vessel Hegg by Philippine Air Force fighters off Mindanao.

== Early life ==
Castro was born on July 30, 1925, in Norzagaray, Bulacan. He took his primary and secondary education in Cabanatuan, Nueva Ecija. His sister, Gloria, later married Teodulfo Bautista, a fellow graduate of the Philippine Military Academy (PMA) from Marikina who would become a close friend to Castro.

== Military career ==
He was among the first batch of post-World War II graduates of the Philippine Military Academy in 1951. The graduation date was advanced a month earlier to meet the requirement for platoon leaders very much needed because of the growing insurgency threat posed by the Communist Party of the Philippines and its military arm, the Hukbong Magpapalayang Bayan (HMB). His initial assignment was leader of Combat Intelligence Teams of the 7th Battalion Combat Team (BCT) under Col. Napoleon Valeriano. Castro experienced being assigned to the field as a platoon leader (during which he was wounded in action), as company executive officer, company commander and Battalion Intelligence officer during the anti-dissident campaign.

A break in this campaign resulted only when he was fielded to the Korean War in March 1953 where he initially served as a platoon leader of Quad 50, 145th AAA (Artillery & Antiaircraft) Battalion, 45th Infantry Division, US Army. He was eventually assigned as a platoon leader of the Recon Company, 14th Battalion Combat Team (BCT), Philippine Expeditionary Forces to Korea (PEFTOK) under Col. Nicanor Jimenez. The battalion was assigned in Smoke Valley between Sandbag Castle and Heartbreak Ridge. After several engagements, his unit was redeployed to the M-1 Ridge, Christmas Hill Sector up to the truce in July 1953. Later, he served part of his Korean tour as Liaison Officer in the US Army Supply Base in Pusan.

Upon returning to the Philippines, he was once again a company commander in the anti-HMB (forerunner of the New People's Army) campaign until his battalion was sent to Jolo, Sulu in early 1955 to participate in the Kamlon campaign. Even when Kamlon surrendered, he completed his one-year tour of duty in Jolo.

From 1958 to 1963, he served with the National Intelligence Coordinating Agency (NICA) as head of the Domestic Branch, Special Operations Division, Operation Group. After this he served as operations and training officer of the University of the Philippines’ ROTC (Vanguards) Department. Another training assignment made him Instructor and Acting head, Department of Tactics, School for Combat Arms, Philippine Army School Center. In 1965, he was transferred to the Philippine Constabulary where he had various assignments, the last being Zone 2 of the 2nd PC Zone under Gen. Manuel Yan.

In 1966 he was reassigned back to the Philippine Army and was selected to join the 1st Philippine Civic Action Group – Vietnam (PHILCAG-V) under Gen. Gaudencio Tobias. Tobias was the battalion commander of the 14th BCT after Korea and Castro had served as his S2. In Vietnam, Castro was the Liaison Officer for Operations and Intelligence with Free World Military Assistance Headquarters, MACV from 1966 to 1968. His assignment included coordination with US Government Embassy Liaisons Edward Lansdale and Napoleon Valeriano, his former battalion commander. PHILCAGV was stationed in Tây Ninh Province. Notable areas where his duties took him were to Mỹ Tho, Tiền Giang Province, Nhi Binh Hamlet, Hóc Môn District and to the northernmost town of South Vietnam - Đông Hà, Quảng Trị Province. The Tet Offensive, where close quarters hostilities occurred and the May Offensive was launched by the NVA/VC during this tour of duty.

In 1969, he served with J2 AFP under Gen. Rafael Ileto and Gen. Fidel V. Ramos as Head of the Production Branch (Research), which gave him also the opportunity to sit with the 14th Intelligence Assessment Committee of SEATO in Bangkok, Thailand. He served in the Diplomatic Corps as Armed Forces Attaché of the Philippine Embassy in Rangoon, Burma from June 1970 to June 1974.

Upon his return to the Philippines, he was immediately fielded south in Mindanao where an insurgency by the Moro National Liberation Front (MNLF) headed by Nur Misuari had escalated. He was initially assigned as Assistant Division Commander of the Army's 4th Infantry Division and concurrently Brigade Commander of its 2nd Brigade. Then he was made Deputy Commander of the Southwest Command (SOWESCOM) under Adm. Romulo Espaldon and concurrently the Ground Forces Commander. He was then shifted to the Central Mindanao Command (CEMCOM) in November 1975 also as Deputy Commander. In March 1976 he took over command of CEMCOM from Gen. Fortunato Abat who had been appointed CG, Philippine Army. He was the Commanding General of CEMCOM up to the year end of 1980. Also in early 1980, he was made Acting Commander of the Southern Command (SOUTHCOM).

On December 31, 1980, General Castro was designated Commander of SOUTHCOM. Under his command, SOUTHCOM had operational control of the whole of Mindanao including Basilan, Sulu and Tawi-Tawi. At the peak of its strength it had the 1st Division and 4th Division, Philippine Army; two (2) brigades of the 3rd Division, one (1) brigade of the 2nd Division, some battalions of the 5th Division, PA; two (2) brigades of the Philippine Marines; All Philippine Constabulary (PC) and Police units in Mindanao; the 3rd Air Division, Philippine Air Force (PAF); the Naval Forces Southern Philippines (NAVFORSOUTH); and Civilian Home Defense Forces (CHDF) - 35,000 of them armed with high powered firearms and 2,000 Special Para-Military Forces (SPMF) composed of Moro National Liberation Front (MNLF) returnees. All told SOUTHCOM had under its operational control some 75,000 Armed Forces and police personnel and about 50,000 para-military personnel.

He spent the last 12 years of his military career in the Mindanao conflict area and his field operations resulted in the surrender of many top MNLF Revolutionary Commanders with their followers including Amelil Malagiok alias Commander Ronnie of Cotabato, Jamil Lucman alias Commander Jungle Fox of Lanao and Commanders Haji Hudan Abubakar and Gerry Salapuddin of Basilan. The Communist Party New People's Army (CPP/NPA) also suffered heavy losses and setbacks with hundreds in confirmed casualties and captured. Four brigades and fifteen battalions were shifted from MNLF areas in Region IX and XII to neutralize the threat of CPP/NPA affected areas in Region X and XI. Over 4,000 members of its organized mass base surrendered in a single year. The military had captured Benjamin de Vera, head of the Mindanao Commission (KOMMID) while his successor, Edgar Jopson, a member of the Central Committee and executive committee had died while avoiding capture in Davao. During these years of service in Mindanao, General Castro had survived several hostile fires airborne and on the ground, plane mishaps and a helicopter (Huey UH1H) crash.

He turned over the command to Brig. Gen. Jose Magno on March 5, 1986, upon his retirement. He had been the senior PMA graduate and 3rd ranking officer in the AFP next to Chief of Staff Gen. Fabian Ver and Vice Chief of Staff Lt. Gen. Fidel V. Ramos.

== Military training ==
His military schooling include among others:

- Airborne Course, 1st Special Forces Co. (Abn), Fort Magsaysay, Philippines
- Chemical, Biological and Radiological (CBR) Warfare Officer Course, US Army, Hawaii, USA
- Ranger Course, The Infantry School, Fort Benning, Georgia, USA
- Associate Infantry Officer Career Course, Fort Benning, Georgia, USA
- Combat Operations Specialist Course, USAF Air Ground Operations School, Eglin Air Force Base, Florida, USA
- Command and General Staff Course, Fort Bonifacio, Philippines.

== Awards and decorations ==

Badges, tabs & patches:

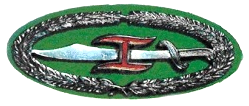
Combat Commander's (Kagitingan) Badge (CC(K)B)
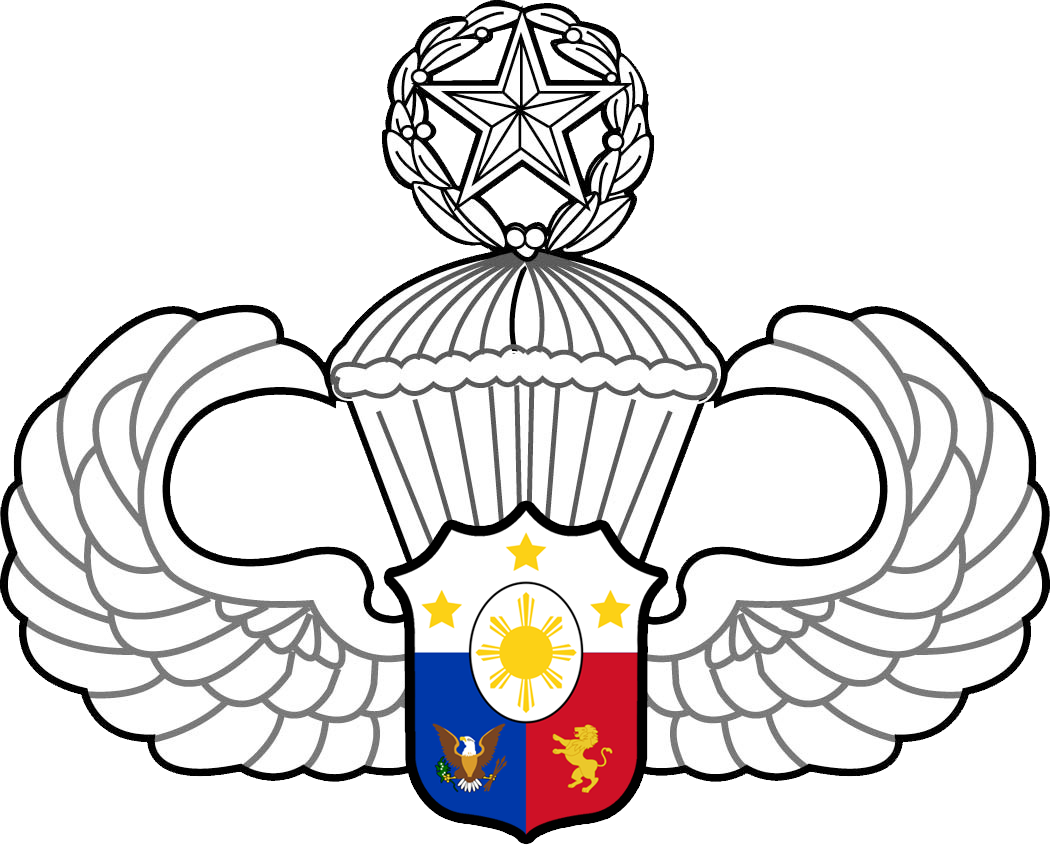
Republic of the Philippines Parachutist Badge
Ranger Tab
Basic US Parachutist Badge
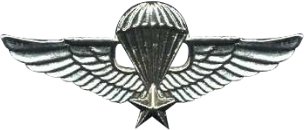
Republic of Vietnam Senior Parachutist Badge
Philippines Air Force Gold Wings Badge

Other awards:
Pistol Expert Badge
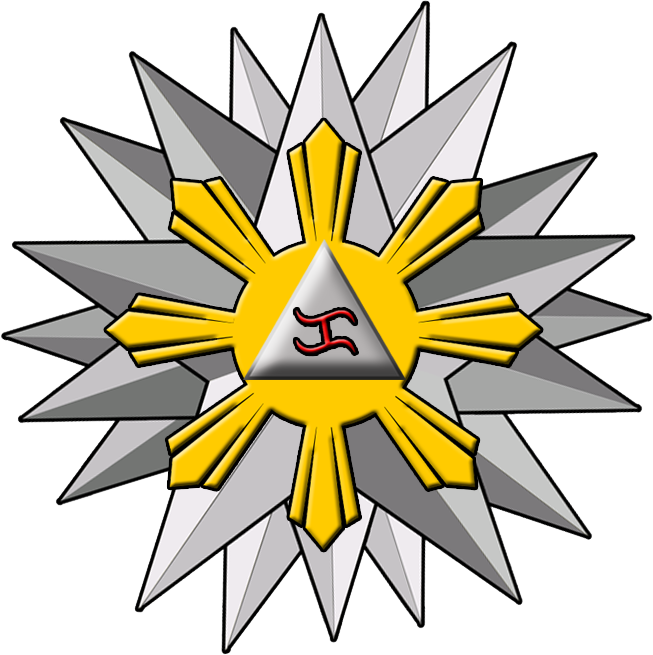
CGSC Excellence Award
PMA Cavalier Award for Military Operations
Republic of Vietnam Armor Badge

== Retirement ==
In July 2005, General Castro released his book A Mindanao Story: Troubled Decades in the Eye of the Storm.
