= Robert G. Rich Jr. =

American Ambassador to Belize (born 1930)

Robert G. Rich Jr. (born November 15, 1930) is an American former diplomat who served as the Ambassador to Belize.

Rich was born in Gainesville, Florida on November 15, 1930. He graduated from the University of Florida in 1952 and served in the United States Navy as a junior naval officer,1952 - 1954. After serving in the Navy, he attended “Cornell University as a candidate in the graduate school in cultural anthropology and Asian Studies.” Rich joined the Foreign Service in 1957 after working as a junior research engineer at Sperry Corporation. He had also worked as a graduate research assistant in physics. After the Korean War he also worked as a graduate teaching assistant in academia.

Rich would take on the following assignments:

- State Department - Department Secretariat 1957-1959
- South Korea - Political Officer 1959-1962
- Indonesia - Principal Officer 1962-1963
- State Department - Deputy Director, Operations Center 1967-1971
- Trinidad - Deputy Chief of Mission 1971-1977
- State Department - Korea Desk 1977-1981
- State Department - Senior Seminar 1981-1982
- Philippines - Deputy Chief of Mission 1982-1986
- Belize - Ambassador 1987-1990
- Atlanta University Center - Ambassador-in-Residence 1990-1991

When Philippine President Ferdinand Marcos was deposed in 1986 after a 20-year dictatorship, he and 90 other members of his entourage found themselves in exile in Hawaii. Robert Rich was assigned by the State Department as the minder of the Marcoses, as the deposed leader demanded a direct line with President Ronald Reagan.
