= 1972 ambush of Juan Ponce Enrile =

Disputed ambush in Mandaluyong, Philippines

On September 22, 1972, Juan Ponce Enrile, then defense minister of the Philippines, was allegedly ambushed near the upscale Wack Wack Village in Mandaluyong, Rizal, (Note: Mandaluyong was a part of Rizal until the establishment of Metro Manila as the National Capital Region in 1978) while he was traveling in his white Mercedes-Benz sedan. It was cited by President Ferdinand Marcos as the proximate incident that led to the declaration of martial law the following day, although Marcos would later claim that he signed the formal proclamation of martial law on September 21, the day before the Enrile ambush.

== Background ==
By September 1972, Ferdinand Marcos was on the third year of his second term as President of the Philippines, which would have been his last allowed term under the 1935 Constitution of the Philippines, and there was a public perception that Marcos would attempt to find a way to extend his term, either through influencing the outcome of the Philippine Constitutional Convention of 1971, or through a declaration of martial law.

In December 1969, Marcos asked cabinet members to explore his martial law options at least twice: when he tasked Executive Secretary Alejandro Melchor to prepare a study on the potential impacts of such a declaration, and when he asked then-Justice Secretary Enrile to study what powers the 1935 Constitution would grant the President upon the declaration of martial law. Enrile submitted his report within a month of Marcos' 1970 reelection, and Marcos then ordered Enrile to prepare the needed documents for implementing martial law in the Philippines. Two years later, in February 1972, Enrile was moved from the Justice portfolio and appointed as Marcos' Secretary of Defense.

Meanwhile, Marcos' second term was beset with social unrest which had begun with the 1969 Philippine balance of payments crisis attributed to massive debt-driven spending linked to Marcos' 1969 reelection campaign. Protests erupted in January 1970, within a month of his second inauguration on December 30, 1969—a period popularly referred to as the First Quarter Storm. Later incidents include the Diliman Commune uprising of February 1971, the Plaza Miranda bombing of August 1971, and a series of minor but persistent bombings throughout the Philippines' Capital Region in 1972. Government forces were suspected of involvement in both the Plaza Miranda bombing and the Metro manila bombings, although the recently re-established Communist Party of the Philippines was also suspected of culpability.

By 1972, Marcos had issued orders for the Philippine military to prepare for the implementation of martial law, distributing his plans to twelve key Generals and naming each copy after a sign of the Zodiac. National Intelligence Coordinating Agency chief Marcos Soliman received a copy marked "Oplan Sagittarius," which was leaked to the senate and became the focus of a senate investigation. Once martial law had been out in place, Soliman was reported to have died of an alleged heart attack.

== Accounts of alleged ambush ==
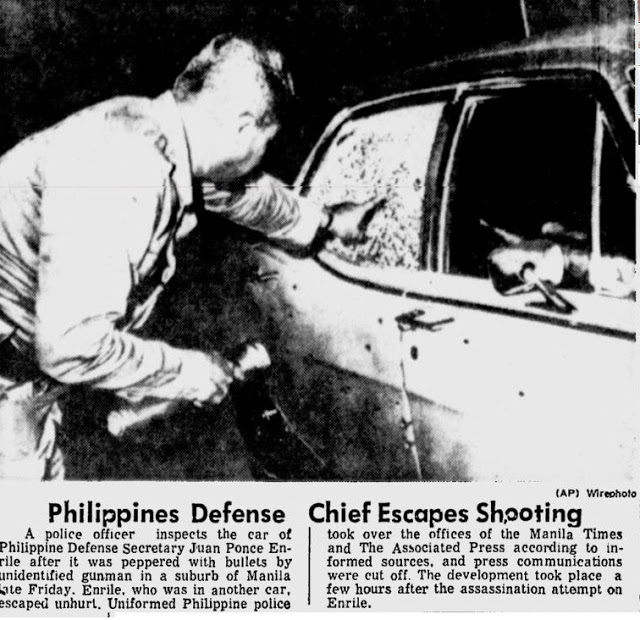
Juan Ponce Enrile's bullet-riddled car

On the evening of September 22, 1972, news reports were full of accounts that the car of Defense Minister Enrile had been attacked near the upscale Wack Wack subdivision in Mandaluyong. Witnesses had reported hearing gunshots, and then seeing a bullet riddled car on the road after the sound of gunfire had ceased. Further reports during that evening no longer came out, because martial law was implemented in the minutes leading up to midnight. Various conflicting accounts of that eventing's events have surfaced over the years, including a diary recollection by Ferdinand Marcos, a witness account by Wack Wack resident Oscar Lopez, and two conflicting accounts by Enrile himself.

=== Marcos diary account ===
In an account Marcos recorded in his diary, he said that Enrile had been ambushed near Wack Wack at 8 P.M that evening, but that Enrile had not been in the car that was attacked because he rode a different car as a security measure. The car Enrile was supposed to be in had been riddled by bullets from a parked car nearby.

This version of events remained the official account throughout the 14-year Marcos dictatorship, which included nine years under martial law and a five-year period in which Marcos had officially "lifted" martial law but retained most of his authoritarian powers. While doubts regarding the Enrile ambush existed during this period, they could not be explored fully until February 1986, when Marcos was ousted by the People Power Revolution.

=== Primitivo Mijares account ===
Marcos aide-turned-whistleblower Primitivo Mijares wrote in 1976 that on the night of the incident, Marcos told Enrile on the phone, "Make it look good. Kailangan siguro ay may masaktan o kung mayroon mapatay ay mas mabuti. [Maybe it would be better if someone got hurt or killed.] O, hala, sige, Johnny, and be sure the story catches the Big News or Newswatch and call me as soon as it is over."

=== 1986 Enrile account and Post-EDSA media interviews ===
In the immediate aftermath of the 1986 EDSA People Power revolution, one of the questions journalists first asked Enrile was the matter of whether the 1972 ambush had in fact been true, or whether it had been faked. In interviews with local broadsheet the Philippine Daily Inquirer and Australian publication The Age, Enrile stated that the ambush had been faked, with The Age reporting that "Mr Enrile told a media conference at Camp Crame that an alleged attempted assassination of himself 14 years ago—one of the factors which led to the imposition of martial law—was staged." This assertion was later cited by other journalists, including Time correspondent Sandra Burton and Philippine Graphic editor and later National Artist Nick Joaquin.

Enrile also separately admitted to journalist Katherine Ellison and to New York Times reporter Raymond Bonner that the ambush had been a fake. Bonner corroborated his account through other sources, noting that "Several American intelligence officers told me that the car attack was phony. 'Flimflam.'" Enrile's wife Cristina likewise told Bonner that "God had had nothing to do" with saving Enrile from the ambush, because in fact "Marcos and Enrile had staged the 'ambush,' as the final justification for martial law."

=== Oscar Lopez account ===
One of the few well-documented firsthand accounts of the event was that of Oscar M. Lopez of the Lopez Holdings Corporation, who had lived in Wack Wack near the site of the alleged ambush at the time. Recounting the events off September 22, 1972, in his book Phoenix: The Saga of the Lopez Family, he recounts: "After the shooting died down, I went out. I took a peek at what was happening outside my fence, and I saw this car riddled with bullets. Nobody was hurt; there was no blood. The car was empty." Lopez added that he knew from what he saw that whatever had happened to the car, "it had been no ambush."

Lopez later said that their driver had seen the incident itself:

"Our driver happened to be bringing our car into our driveway at around that time, so he saw the whole thing. He told me that there was this car that came by and stopped beside a Meralco post. Some people started riddling it with bullets to make it look like it was ambushed. But nobody got killed or anything like that. My driver saw this. He was describing it to me."

=== Fidel V. Ramos account ===
Some years after his presidency, former president Fidel V. Ramos also said in a 2012 book that "Enrile himself admitted that his reported ambush was a 'fake' and that his unoccupied car had been riddled with machine gun bullets fired by his own men on the night Proclamation 1081 was signed."

== 2012 Enrile denial ==
In 2012, however, Enrile began to deny that the 1972 had been ambushed, claiming in his book Juan Ponce Enrile: A Memoir that his political opponents had been the ones to spread the account that the 1972 ambush was staged as a justification for martial law. Enrile repeated this denial several times after that, leading up to the election of Marcos's son Bongbong Marcos as President of the Philippines.

== Pretext for the declaration of martial law ==
While not mentioned in the already prepared documents proclaiming martial law in the Philippines, Marcos cited the Enrile ambush as a rationalization for the proclamation in his diary, which historians agree to have been written for purposes of release to the public. In his entry for September 1972, Marcos wrote that Enrile had been ambushed near Wack-Wack that night. He wrote that "it was a good thing he was riding in his security car as a protective measure... This makes the martial law proclamation a necessity."

The implementation of martial law began sometime before midnight on September 22, with the arrest of the two main opposition leaders, Ninoy Aquino, who on September 21 held a Congress speech to denounce impending martial law, and Jose W. Diokno, who held a rally with 50,000 people from the Movement of Concerned Citizens for Civil Liberties (MCCCL) at Plaza Miranda on the same day. By dawn of the following day, many of the 400 individuals listed on the military's priority arrest list—journalists, members of the political opposition, constitutional convention delegates, outspoken lawyers, teachers, and students—had been detained.

Media outlets were shuttered, although those linked with Marcos crony Roberto Benedicto were allowed to reopen within the day. Soon after, Congress was abolished, mass activities were prohibited, political parties were outlawed, a curfew was put in place, and civil and political rights were suspended.

Martial law immediately shut down 7 television stations, 16 national daily newspapers, 11 weekly magazines, 66 community newspapers, and 292 radio stations; as well as public utilities such as Meralco, PLDT, and the three then-existing Philippine airlines.

Marcos' 14 years as dictator is historically remembered for its record of human rights abuses, particularly targeting political opponents, student activists, journalists, religious workers, farmers, and others who fought against the Marcos dictatorship. Based on the documentation of Amnesty International, Task Force Detainees of the Philippines, and similar human rights monitoring entities, historians believe that the Marcos dictatorship was marked by 3,257 known extrajudicial killings, 35,000 documented tortures, 77 forced disappearances, and 70,000 incarcerations.

Some 2,520 of the 3,257 murder victims were tortured and mutilated before their bodies were dumped in various places for the public to discover—a tactic meant to sow fear among the public, which came to be known as "salvaging." Some bodies were even cannibalized.

== Aftermath ==
As a key player in the planning and implementation of martial law, Enrile remained one of Marcos' most loyal allies in the dictatorship's early years. In 1973, Enrile's title became Defense Minister under the new modified parliamentary system put in place during martial law. The abolition of civilian institutions such as Congress, the weakening of the judiciary, and the outlawing of political parties, left the military as the only other instrumentality of the national government outside of the Presidency.

The National Historical Commission of the Philippines (NHCP) notes that Enrile, as one of Marcos' cronies, was controversially appointed to highly profitable positions during this time. According to the NCHP, he was tasked by Marcos to give certificates to logging companies, which eventually led to the forest cover of the Philippines shrank until only 8% remained, while Enrile concurrently owned numerous logging companies such as Ameco in Bukidnon, Dolores Timber in Samar, San Jose Timber in Northern Samar, Kasilagan Softwood Development Corp in Butuan, Eurasia Match in Cebu, Pan Oriental which operates in Cebu and Butuan, Palawan-Apitong Corp in Palawan, and Royal Match.

The NHCP also recounts that Enrile was appointed by Marcos as the President of the Philippine Coconut Authority, where he established control of the copra industry together with Danding Cojuangco. The fund, which was supposed to be used to improve the country's copra industry, was used by Enrile and Cojuangco for programs led by Imelda Marcos and other Marcos cronies. A large portion of the fund was also used for the presidential campaigns of Ferdinand Marcos in 1983.

With rising factionalism in the Marcos administration towards its latter years, Enrile's influence began to be reduced. By the 1980s, Marcos clipped the powers of the Minister of National Defense and the Chief of Staff over the Armed Forces of the Philippines, and began to more aggressively bypass Enrile's authority.

In February 1986, Enrile turned his back on Marcos and co-organized a failed coup against the administration. Enrile asked Catholic Cardinal Archbishop Jaime Sin for assistance. Sin called on the civil groups which were already organizing protests in light of alleged cheating in the 1986 presidential election, and the large turnout of peaceful protesters led to Marcos being unable to attack the coup plotters, and eventually forced Marcos out of office and into exile.
