= Pata Island massacre =

1981 killing of soldiers in the Philippines

Coordinates: 5.8288°N 121.1596°E

- Part of the Moro conflict
- Pata Island (Philippines)
Date	February 12, 1981
Location	Pata, Sulu, Philippines
Result	MNLF victory

Belligerents
Philippine Army	Moro National Liberation Front

Commanders and leaders
Lt. Col Jacinto Sardual (executed); 1LT Alfredo Reyes (executed) (Operations and Training Officer); 1LT Claudio Dagatan (executed) (Commanding Officer of Headquarters and Headquarters Service Company); 1LT Cobayan Tandiong (executed) (Intelligence Officer); 2LT Joel Cañares (executed) (Commanding Officer of Echo Company); 2LT Tito Castillo (executed) (Signal Officer)	Commander Unad Masillam also called Meas Unad

Units involved
Headquarters Service Company; 31st Infantry Battalion; 1st Infantry Division	Unknown

Strength
approximately 125 soldiers	approximately 400 men

Casualties and losses
119 to 125 killed (including 6 field officers); 3 wounded	16-49 killed

The Pata Island massacre refers to an event that took place on February 12, 1981, on Pata Island, Sulu province in the Philippines. More than 100 Philippine Army officers and men were killed by Moro natives in what was called by retired Major General Delfin Castro as "the biggest number of casualties incurred by the Armed Forces of the Philippines in a single incident since the start of the conflict in Mindanao and had the dubious distinction of achieving the biggest losses in AFP firearms and equipment in a single incident." Several hundreds to 3,000 Tausug civilians, including women and children, were killed in months of shelling by military forces in 1982 and was tagged as the Pata Island massacre.

== Events prior to massacre ==
The 1st Infantry Division of the Philippine Army conducted an operation on Pata Island on February 9, 1981, after receiving reports of landings being made there by Moro National Liberation Front elements. The 31st Infantry Battalion was at the forefront of this operation, assisted by two other battalions. After being assured by local barangay leaders that no MNLF forces had landed, the 31st Infantry Battalion began to withdraw its troops from the island on February 12, 1981, leaving its Headquarters Service Company along with battalion commander Lieutenant Colonel Jacinto Sardual.

== The massacre ==
Lt. Col. Sardual called on a Civilian Home Defense Forces commander Unad Masillam before his planned departure. Masillam and his men then accompanied Sardual back to the Headquarters Service Company's encampment, at which point Masillam asked Sardual to form up the company and stack up their weapons so that both sides could conduct a farewell ceremony. Sardual, who was a dental officer, complied and gave the order for his men to do so.

The Moros surrounded the government troops and then opened fire using automatic rifles. Responding soldiers who later discovered the bodies of their dead comrades reported finding spent .30 caliber shell casings and links at the Moros' firing positions, indicating the use of machine guns. Accounts vary regarding the number of dead Philippine Army troopers; reports indicate a body count of 119 and 124. Some of the bodies were found with defensive wounds on their arms inflicted by bladed weapons; many bodies were found in a pit near a mosque, scorched, indicating that an attempt to burn them was made. Three of the company survived, all of them wounded.

== Retaliation ==
The Philippine Air Force and the Philippine Navy bombed and shelled the island for nearly two months in support of Philippine Army search operations to capture the perpetrators, though 300 rebels may have evaded capture by escaping to Sabah, Malaysia. Juan Ponce Enrile, then Defense Minister, described the perpetrators as simply "armed men", probably smugglers or remnants of the Moro National Liberation Front.

49 MNLF fighters responsible in the massacre including Meas Unad, Who was their leader was killed by Government troops in retaliation

Several hundreds to 3,000 Tausug civilians, including women and children, were killed in months of military shelling in 1982, and this was termed a massacre by Maguindanao Assemblyman Khadafe Mangudadatu and others.
