= Tacub massacre =

1971 killing of Moro Muslims in the Philippines

- Part of the Moro conflict
- Magsaysay, Lanao del Norte (Philippines)
- Location: 8.0274°N 123.9192°E; Magsaysay, Lanao del Norte, Philippines
- Date: October 24, 1971 (UTC +8)
- Target: Filipino Muslims
- Attack type: Mass shooting
- Weapon: Small arms
- Deaths: 40-140
- Perpetrator: Philippine Army

The Tacub massacre was the mass murder of a group of Muslim Moros by Philippine government troops at a military checkpoint on October 24, 1971. The Moros were returning from attempting to vote in a special election; they had been turned away by the Ilaga from polling places in Magsaysay, Lanao del Norte. The troops were later identified as troops of the Philippine Army stationed in Tacub, Kauswagan, Lanao del Norte, which then lent its name to the incident, and Christian civilians. At least 40 Moros were killed. Other sources report the number of fatalities to be as high as 66 with the highest estimate of fatalities to be 140 The bodies of the Moro Muslim victims were also reportedly mutilated by civilian bystanders.
