= List of assassinations in the Philippines =

The following is a chronological list of people in the Philippines murdered by assassins. This list includes public figures and other prominent individuals who were active in politics and daily life. Most of these assassinations are attributed to state forces, rebel groups such as the New People's Army or the Abu Sayyaf Group or contract killers working on behalf of politicians (particularly in the context of electoral rivalries), businesspeople and organized crime.

For a list of journalists assassinated in the Philippines, see List of journalists killed in the Philippines

== Assassinations before 1940 ==
Date	Victim(s)	Assassin(s)	Notes
1 May 1521	Duarte Barbosa, Portuguese explorer and leader of the Magellan expedition		Massacred along with 26 others in a banquet hosted by Rajah Humabon shortly after the death of Ferdinand Magellan in the Battle of Mactan.
25 October 1593	Gomez Perez Dasmariñas, Spanish Governor-General of the Philippines		Killed in a mutiny by Chinese rowers during a Spanish military expedition to the Moluccas.
1596	Magalat, Cagayano rebel		
1608	Luis Enriquez, Spanish encomendero of Pilitan, Cagayan Valley		Killed during a revolt by Irraya natives
1 August 1617	Fray Vicente de Sepulveda, Rector Provincial of the Order of Saint Augustine	Juan de Ocadiz; Juan de Quintana; Andres Encinas; Ignacio de Alcaras	Killed at the San Agustin Church
1625	Father Alonzo Garcia and Brother Onofre Palao, Spanish missionaries based in Apayao	Miguel Lanab; Alababan	Killed during the Itneg or Mandaya Revolt.
1650	Agustin Sumuroy, Waray rebel		
1661	José Arias, Spanish Augustinian curate of Bacarra, Ilocos		Killed in a revolt led by Pedro Almazán.
1661	José Navarro de Santa María, Spanish Dominican curate of Cabicungan, Cagayan		Killed in a revolt led by Pedro Almazán.
1663	Francisco de Mesa, Spanish priest based in Iloilo		Killed in a revolt led by Tapar.
11 October 1719	Fernando Manuel de Bustamante, Spanish Governor-General of the Philippines		Dragged and killed along with his son by a mob instigated by friars.
1744	Giuseppe Lamberti, Italian-born Jesuit curate of Jagna, Bohol	Francisco Dagohoy	Killed during the Dagohoy Rebellion.
1744	Gaspar Morales, Spanish curate of Inabanga, Bohol	Francisco Dagohoy	Killed in retaliation for his refusal to administer a Christian burial for Dagohoy's brother, who died while performing an errand for the priest, which triggered Dagohoy's revolt.
28 May 1763	Diego Silang, Ilocano rebel leader, and husband of Gabriela Silang	Miguel Vicos; Pedro Bebec	Church authorities paid the assassins. Vicos was Silang's friend.
1 June 1823	Mariano Fernández de Folgueras, former Spanish Governor-General of the Philippines		Killed by rebelling Spanish soldiers during the Novales Revolt.
9 August 1846	Juan Rubio, Spanish curate of Carig, Nueva Vizcaya		Killed and beheaded in an ambush by Ifugaos.
1860	Jose Pinzon y Purga, Spanish governor of Davao		Killed by Moros resisting his attempt to organize a settlement in Tagum.
14 August 1868	Jose Lorenzo, Spanish missionary priest based in Ibaay, Ifugao		Killed by Ifugao natives
6 April 1870	Victorino Garcia, Spanish missionary priest of Lagawe, Ifugao		Believed to have been thrown off a cliff by Ifugao natives
25 April 1897	Ciriaco Bonifacio, revolutionary and brother of Katipunan founder Andres Bonifacio	Revolutionary soldiers led by Agapito Bonzon and Jose Ignacio Paua	Killed during the arrest of his brother under the command of Emilio Aguinaldo during the Philippine Revolution.
8 April 1898	León Kilat, Cebuano revolutionary leader	Captain Florencio Noel; Apolinario Alcuitas	Killed by his own men due to endangering the town of Carcar.
5 June 1899	Antonio Luna, Commanding General of the Philippine Revolutionary Army during the Philippine–American War	Kawit Battalion (Presidential Guard) led by Pedro Janolino	Killed along with his aide, Colonel Francisco "Paco" Roman after receiving a summons to republican headquarters in Cabanatuan.
6 June 1906	Edward Robert C. Bolton, American Military Governor of Davao	Mangulayon	Killed along with his foreman by a Kulaman Manobo chief.
20 January 1908	Benito Lopez, Governor of Iloilo	Joaquin Gil	Shot by a supporter of a political rival
3 August 1918	Conrado Lerma, Governor of Bataan	Jose Baluyot	Shot by a political rival
23 February 1932	Soliman Peralta, Vice Mayor of Malita, Davao		Killed along with nine others in an attack by Moros.
20 September 1935	Julio Nalundasan, Congressman for the 2nd district of Ilocos Norte		Future President Ferdinand Marcos, then a university student, tried but acquitted for the murder.
14 December 1938	James Fugate, former Governor of Sulu		

== 1940s ==
Date	Victim(s)	Assassin(s)	Notes
1 May 1942	Jose Abad Santos, Chief Justice of the Philippines and de facto head of the Philippine Commonwealth during the Japanese occupation of the Philippines		Killed by Japanese forces in Malabang, Lanao del Sur for refusing to serve in a collaborationist government.
June 1942	Severino Macasocol, Mayor of Sogod, Leyte		Believed to have been killed on the orders of a prewar-electoral rival.
June 1942	Pablo Magliate, Vice Mayor of Sogod, Leyte		Believed to have been killed on the orders of a prewar-electoral rival.
15 July 1942	Wenceslao Vinzons, Congressman for the lone district of Camarines Norte		Killed by Japanese forces for his role in the resistance during World War II.
1943	Tee Han Kee, Chinese Filipino community leader and vice chairman of the Japanese-sponsored Chinese Association		Killed by guerrillas for collaborating with the Japanese.
1944	Gregorio Felipe, district chief of San Francisco del Monte after the dissolution of Quezon City into its component neighborhoods during the Japanese occupation		Killed by guerrillas for collaborating with the Japanese.
11 February 1944	José Ozámiz, Senator and former Governor of Misamis Occidental		Killed by Japanese forces for his role in the resistance movement.
28 December 1944	Enrique Roldan, former mayor of Bayambang, Pangasinan		
31 December 1944	Vicente Lim, military officer		Killed by Japanese forces for his role in the resistance movement.
6 January 1945	Josefa Llanes Escoda, civic leader and founder of the Girl Scouts of the Philippines		Killed by Japanese forces for her role in the resistance movement.
15 February 1945	Juan Gabriel, Mayor of Parañaque		Killed by guerrillas for collaborating with the Japanese.
21 February 1945	Pablo Amorsolo, painter and educator		Claimed to have been killed by guerrillas for collaborating with the Japanese.
8 March 1945	Mariano Marcos, former congressman for the 2nd district of Ilocos Norte and father of future President Ferdinand Marcos		Claimed by his family to have been killed by the Japanese, while military archives blame his death on guerrillas commanded by Robert Lapham for collaborating with the Japanese.
24 August 1946	Juan Feleo, peasant leader and one of the leaders of the Partido Komunista ng Pilipinas and the Hukbalahap		His assassination triggered the post-World War II phase of the Hukbalahap Rebellion.
February 1949	Patrocinio Gulapa, Mayor of Maragondon, Cavite		
1949	Hugo Beratio, Mayor of Bailen, Cavite		
28 April 1949	Aurora Quezon, former First Lady of the Philippines and widow of President Manuel L. Quezon		Died with her daughter, son-in-law and several others in an ambush believed to have been perpetrated by the Hukbalahap.
28 April 1949	Ponciano Bernardo, Mayor of Quezon City		Died with Aurora Quezon and several others in an ambush believed to have been perpetrated by the Hukbalahap.
14 November 1949	Sofronio Avanceña, Mayor of Sinacaban, Misamis Occidental		

== 1950s ==
Date	Victim(s)	Assassin(s)	Notes
1 November 1950	Eugenio Jaro, former governor of Leyte		
7 October 1951	Asiong Salonga, gangster	Ernesto Reyes	Shot by a henchman of a rival gang leader
14 November 1951	Moises Padilla, mayoral candidate in Magallon, Negros Occidental	Rafael Lacson, Governor of Negros Occidental	Popular outrage over the murder and the swift resolution of the case by Secretary of National Defense Ramon Magsaysay contributed to the latter's victory in the 1953 Philippine presidential election.
23 December 1951	Angel Arias, Mayor-elect of Rosario, Batangas		
22 February 1952	Teodoro Cuartero, former mayor of Rosario, Batangas		
26 May 1952	Pedro Tecala, Mayor of Danao, Cebu		
2 September 1952	Severino Rillo, Mayor of Maragondon, Cavite	Leonardo Manecio, gangster and folk legend acting at the behest of local politicians	Killed along with the town's police chief and several policemen in the Maragondon Massacre.
1953	Eduardo Ocampo Jr., Vice Mayor of Bacoor, Cavite		
15 June 1953	Manuel P. Monroy, star witness in a criminal case against Justice and Defense Secretary Oscar Castelo	Oscar Castelo; Bienvenido "Ben Ulo" Mendoza; Jose de Jesus; Hipolito Bonifacio; Domingo Gonzales; Jockey Salvacion; Felix Miray; Pedro Enriquez; Augusta Melencio	
17 May 1955	Conrado Dizon, Mayor of Santa Ana, Pampanga		
1 November 1957	Regino Sarahina, former Mayor of Panglao, Bohol		Among the six individuals killed in a gunfight between members of Nacionalista and Liberal parties during a raid on the latter's campaign rally.
12 November 1957	Laureano Maraña, Provincial Commander of the Philippine Constabulary in Cavite	Leonardo Manecio	
21 July 1959	Lucio Zabala, Mayor of Cabugao, Ilocos Sur		

== 1960s ==
Date	Victim(s)	Assassin(s)	Notes
April 1962	Menhart Spielman, American businessman and chief witness in the Stonehill scandal		Disappeared and believed to have been killed on a boat while trying to flee to Malaysia.
3 January 1963	Genaro Alvarez Sr., Mayor of Sipalay, Negros Occidental	Pedro Malbajor	
28 December 1963	Benedicto Dayrit, Mayor of Magalang, Pampanga	Hukbong Mapagpalaya sa Bayan	
12 March 1965	Manuel Verzosa, ranking clerk of the House of Representatives Electoral Tribunal	Angel Sarmiento	Killed by an assistant of Cavite Representative Justiniano Montano, who was facing an electoral protest at the time.
1966	Anastacio Gallardo, Mayor of Candaba, Pampanga	Hukbong Mapagpalaya sa Bayan	
18 September 1967	Juan Alberto, former Governor of Catanduanes and head of the Government Service Insurance System		
20 February 1967	James L. Gordon, Mayor of Olongapo, and father of Senator Richard Gordon		
15 November 1967	Manuel Franco, Vice Mayor of Sanchez Mira, Cagayan		Killed in the presence of the town mayor by the latter's goons.
10 July 1968	Nicolas Feliciano, Vice Governor of Tarlac		
28 December 1968	Levi Panlilio, Mayor of San Fernando, Pampanga		
19 November 1969	Pedro Alvero, Vice Mayor of Abuyog, Leyte		

== 1970s ==
Date	Victim(s)	Assassin(s)	Notes
21 January 1970	Samson Cerna, Mayor of Pinamungajan, Cebu		
15 February 1970	Julito Espino, Mayor of Arayat, Pampanga		
29 July 1970	Calixto Cauan, former mayor of San Pablo, Isabela		
18 September 1970	Leopoldo Rabanes, Mayor of San Marcelino, Zambales	Hukbong Mapagpalaya sa Bayan	Killed along with eleven others in an attack on his residence.
18 October 1970	Floro Crisologo, Congressman for the 1st district of Ilocos Sur		Shot inside Vigan Cathedral.
17 November 1970	Luis de Castro, Mayor of Bulan, Sorsogon		
26 December 1971	Jose Cruz, Mayor of Malabon		Killed by a bomb disguised as a "Christmas gift".
February 1972	Ben Fernandez, Mayor of Mabalacat, Pampanga		
15 February 1972	Anatalio L. Reyes, Mayor of Magallanes, Cavite		
25 February 1972	Manuel Rojas, Mayor of Cavite City		Fatally shot along with his driver inside their car.
April 1972	Al Mirasan Tampogao, Vice Mayor of Karomatan, Lanao del Norte		
7 July 1972	Deogracias Carmona, Mayor of Dimataling, Zamboanga del Sur		Killed during the Moro conflict.
5 April 1973	Liliosa Hilao, anti-Marcos student activist	Armed Forces of the Philippines	
13 April 1973	Ramon Alcantara, Mayor of Lemery, Iloilo		
March 1975	William Begg, seminarian and anti-Marcos student activist	Armed Forces of the Philippines	
27 October 1975	Guillermo de Vega, Assistant of President Ferdinand Marcos and Chairman of the Board of Censors for Motion Pictures	Paulino Arceo	Shot in his office in Malacañang Palace due to unclear reasons.
13 December 1975	Hernando Antiporda, Roman Catholic Auxiliary Bishop of the Archdiocese of Manila		Killed along with another priest in the convent of Quiapo Church.
18 March 1976	Emmanuel Lacaba, writer, youth leader and anti-Marcos activist	Armed Forces of the Philippines	
24 March 1976	Maria Lorena Barros, founder of Malayang Kilusan ng Bagong Kababaihan (Free Movement of New Women) (MAKIBAKA) and anti-Marcos activist	Armed Forces of the Philippines	
January 1977	Primitivo Mijares, former propagandist for the Marcos dictatorship		Disappeared after boarding a flight from Guam to the Philippines with General Fabian Ver and a nephew of former Chief Justice Querube Makalintal, both of whom were Marcos allies. Believed to have been killed after denouncing the Marcos regime in the U.S. Congress and writing a book criticizing the Marcoses. His son was later tortured and killed by suspected government agents.
23 January 1977	Purificacion Pedro, Roman Catholic layperson and social worker	Soldiers under the command of Col. Rolando Abadilla	Killed in her hospital room possibly due to her role in organizing indigenous peoples' opposition to the Chico River Dam Project.
2 September 1977	Archimedes Trajano, student activist		Killed after questioning President Ferdinand Marcos' daughter Imee at an open forum at the Pamantasan ng Lungsod ng Maynila, for which she was later found responsible by a Hawaii court.
10 October 1977	Brigadier General Teodulfo Bautista, Commander of the Philippine Army 1st Infantry Division	Moro National Liberation Front rebels commanded by Usman Salih	Killed along with 34 other soldiers in a feigned negotiation during the Patikul massacre.
23 February 1978	Usman Mundoc, former mayor of Luuk, Sulu		

== 1980s ==
Date	Victim(s)	Assassin(s)	Notes
24 April 1980	Macliing Dulag, Kalinga pangat (chieftain) and indigenous peoples' rights activist	Soldiers of the 4th Infantry Division, Philippine Army led by Leodegario Adalem	Killed due to his opposition to the Chico River Dam Project.
6 July 1980	Lotus Sobejana Sr., Municipal Trial Court Judge of Lumban, Laguna		
9 August 1980	Alexander Alngag, Mayor of Tinglayan, Kalinga-Apayao		
16 December 1980	Jose B. Lingad, former Governor of Pampanga and anti-Marcos opposition leader	Roberto Tabanero	Shot in a gasoline station in barangay San Agustin, San Fernando, Pampanga
27 December 1980	Cornelio Martinez Sr., Mayor of Kiamba, South Cotabato		
1 March 1981	Dimanorado Dimragon, Mayor of Tangcal, Lanao del Norte		
13 April 1981	Godofredo Alingal, Jesuit parish priest of Kibawe, Bukidnon and human rights advocate		Shot in front of his church
17 January 1982	Ricardo Francisco Sr., Vice Mayor of Obando, Bulacan		
3 February 1982	Edgardo Canbangon, Mayor of Calauag, Quezon		
10 March 1982	Pablo Sola, Mayor of Kabankalan, Negros Occidental		
26 March 1982	Nonito Llanos Jr., Mayor of Digos, Davao del Sur		
23 April 1982	Bobby Dela Paz, doctor and labor activist		Believed to have been killed due to his opposition to the Marcos dictatorship.
24 April 1982	Felix Ometer, Vice Mayor of Lopez Jaena, Misamis Occidental	New People's Army	
20 September 1982	Edgar Jopson, youth activist and president of the National Union of Students of the Philippines (NUSP)		Killed in a military raid at his house.
3 November 1982	Sebastian Mondejar, Mayor of Sulop, Davao del Sur	New People's Army	
March 1983	Johnny Escandor, doctor and anti-Marcos activist		
21 August 1983	Benigno Aquino Jr., politician, leader of the opposition against President Ferdinand Marcos	Rogelio Moreno (confirmed); AVSECOM members (accomplices)	Shot multiple times in the head upon exiting China Airlines Flight 811 in Manila International Airport (now named Ninoy Aquino International Airport in his memory). The mastermind is still unknown to this day, with suspicions resting upon Marcos and/or his inner circle. See Assassination of Ninoy Aquino.
21 August 1983	Rolando Galman, suspect in the assassination of Benigno Aquino Jr.	Rogelio Moreno (confirmed); AVSECOM members (accomplices)	Killed by soldiers immediately after Aquino's assassination and accused by the Marcos regime of being a hitman for the New People's Army, but was posthumously acquitted as a fall guy. See Assassination of Ninoy Aquino.
11 April 1984	Rosita Villafuerte, Vice Mayor of Sipocot, Camarines Sur		
3 May 1984	Saturnino Calulo, Mayor of Polomolok, South Cotabato		
4 May 1984	Bienvenido Andilab, Mayor of Sergio Osmeña, Zamboanga del Norte		
24 May 1984	Tomas Karingal, commanding general of the Philippine Constabulary Metropolitan Command's Northern Police District	New People's Army	
26 August 1984	Sol Legaspi, Mayor of Libacao, Aklan	New People's Army	
19 October 1984	Alex Orcullo, Davao City barangay captain		Killed by pro-government paramilitaries at a checkpoint.
14 November 1984	Cesar Climaco, Mayor of Zamboanga City, Assemblyman of the Regular Batasang Pambansa and prominent anti-Marcos opposition leader		
25 December 1984	Lorenzo Sia, Vice Mayor of Lapuyan, Zamboanga del Sur		
26 March 1985	Guillermo Calibo, Mayor of Dimataling, Zamboanga del Sur	New People's Army	
11 April 1985	Tullio Favali, Italian Roman Catholic assistant parish priest of Tulunan, Cotabato and member of the Pontifical Institute for Foreign Missions (PIME)	Norberto Manero Jr., a member of the Christian paramilitary group Ilaga based in Mindanao during the Moro conflict	Shot and cannibalized.
19 May 1985	Cesar Magno, Mayor of Initao, Misamis Oriental	New People's Army	
11 July 1985	Rudy Romano, Roman Catholic priest and human rights activist		Forcibly disappeared by suspected military agents in Cebu City.
22 July 1985	Nerio Ramos, Mayor of Lopez, Quezon		
7 September 1985	Westrimundo Tabayoyong, Mayor of Laoac, Pangasinan		
16 September 1985	Felicisimo Iglesia, Mayor of Pakil, Laguna	Lt. Percival Maldo	Killed in a gun duel with the town's police chief, who also died.
16 September 1985	Percival Maldo, police chief of Pakil, Laguna	Felicisimo Iglesia	Killed in a gun duel with the town's mayor, who also died.
20 September 1985	Juvelyn Jaravello, youth activist	Pro-government paramilitaries	Among 20 people who were killed in the Escalante massacre, mostly from gunshot wounds.
30 September 1985	Victor Lopez Jr., barangay chairman in Tondo, Manila		
23 October 1985	Gregorio Murillo, Governor of Surigao del Sur	New People's Army	
2 November 1985	Potenciano Baccay, kidney specialist and personal doctor to President Ferdinand Marcos		Killed amid rumors of Marcos' ill health.
November 1985	Wilfredo "Baby" Aquino, founder of the Alsa Masa		
5 December 1985	Rafael Blanco, Vice Governor of Abra		
9 December 1985	Daguio Valera, Mayor of Licuan-Baay, Abra		
13 January 1986	Romualdo Bediones, Mayor of Villaverde, Nueva Vizcaya	New People's Army	
30 January 1986	Lorenzo Padua, Mayor of Goa, Camarines Sur		
8 February 1986	Francisco Laurella, Fernando Pastor Sr., and Fernando Pastor Jr., campaign workers of Corazon Aquino's UNIDO party in Quirino	Orlando Dulay, pro-Marcos warlord and former Governor of Quirino	Abducted on the eve of the 1986 Philippine presidential election and later killed.
11 February 1986	Evelio Javier, former Governor of Antique and ally of presidential candidate Corazon Aquino	Avelino Javellana and others	The lawyer and several security personnel of his political rival, Arturo Pacificador, were convicted for his murder while the latter was acquitted.
April 1986	Pedro Mendiola, former Assemblyman of the Batasang Pambansa from Occidental Mindoro		
8 April 1986	Federico Peralta, former Governor of Tarlac		
17 April 1986	Emma Henry, the Philippines' first female police commander; police chief of Cabuyao, Laguna; film actress	New People's Army	Shot by four suspected NPA members who had waylaid her while on the way to work
20 April 1986	Abdulgafar Lutian, Mayor of Alicia, Zamboanga del Sur		
23 April 1986	Dorol Guno, Vice Mayor of Rosario, Batangas		
4 June 1986	Paterno Javier, Mayor of Culasi, Antique	New People's Army	
15 July 1986	Felipe Siron, former vice mayor of Mexico, Pampanga		
20 August 1986	Jose Payumo Jr., Mayor of Dinalupihan, Bataan		
13 September 1986	Daniel Lacson, former mayor of Magalang, Pampanga	New People's Army	
29 September 1986	Ramon delos Cientos Sr., former Governor of Davao del Sur	New People's Army	
13 November 1986	Rolando "Ka Lando" Olalia, leader of Kilusang Mayo Uno (KMU)	Fernando Casanova; Dennis Jabatan; Desiderio Perez	Killed along with his driver, Leonor Alay-ay, by members of the Reform the Armed Forces Movement as part of the God Save the Queen Plot.
18 November 1986	David Puzon, former congressman for the 2nd district of Cagayan	New People's Army	
November 22, 1986	Ulbert Ulama Tugung, Muslim community leader		Killed by members of the Reform the Armed Forces Movement as part of the God Save the Queen Plot.
1987	Joaquin Fernandez, Mayor of Pulupandan, Negros Occidental		
22 March 1987	Jorge Arreola, former mayor of Buguey, Cagayan		
2 August 1987	Jaime Ferrer, Secretary of the Interior and Local Government		
5 August 1987	Lorenzo Mabini, Vice Mayor of Bangui, Ilocos Norte	New People's Army	
14 August 1987	Osias Cadiente, former Governor of Nueva Vizcaya	New People's Army	
19 September 1987	Lean Alejandro, secretary general of Bagong Alyansang Makabayan (BAYAN)		
22 October 1987	David Bueno, human rights lawyer and member of the Free Legal Assistance Group (FLAG)		
27 December 1987	Sergio Biolango Sr., former mayor of Jose Dalman, Zamboanga del Norte		
1 January 1988	Pacifico Ocapan, Mayor of San Miguel, Zamboanga del Sur		
3 January 1988	Rodrigo Chua, former Mayor of Sipalay, Negros Occidental	New People's Army	
4 January 1988	Zosimo Bugas, former mayor of Nabunturan, Davao del Norte		
7 January 1988	Ceferino Lumanlan, former mayor of Porac, Pampanga		
8 January 1988	Benjamin Cuaresma Jr., Mayor of Bambang, Nueva Vizcaya	New People's Army	
17 January 1988	Roy Padilla Sr., Governor of Camarines Norte, and father of action star and Senator Robin Padilla		
28 January 1988	Anastacio Malang, Mayor of Arayat, Pampanga		
21 April 1988	Absalon Catarata, Mayor of Valencia, Bukidnon		
28 April 1988	Noe Tarrosa, Mayor of Cajidiocan, Romblon		
17 June 1988	Romeo Balinas, former vice mayor of Sipalay, Negros Occidental	New People's Army	
21 June 1988	Angelito Miranda, Mayor of Bacoor, Cavite	New People's Army	
1 July 1988	Mario Estorba, Roman Catholic parish priest of Loreto, Agusan del Sur		Believed to have been killed due to his stance against illegal logging.
27 December 1988	Porferio Branzuela, Mayor of Calamba, Misamis Occidental	New People's Army	
1989	Oscar Reyes, Mayor of Rosario, Cavite		
1989	Oswaldo de Dios, Mayor of Carmen, Cebu		
5 January 1989	General Eduardo Batalla, Regional Philippine Constabulary-Integrated National Police Commander for Western Mindanao	Rizal Alih, suspect in the murder of Zamboanga City Mayor Cesar Climaco	Killed along with his aide, Col. Romeo Abendan and several others during the Camp Cawa-Cawa siege.
15 February 1989	Jeremias Villanueva, Mayor of Amadeo, Cavite		The National Bureau of Investigation (NBI) blamed the assassination on Villanueva's political rival, former Mayor Reynaldo Bayot.
1 March 1989	Capistrano Legaspi, former mayor of Kinoguitan, Misamis Oriental		
17 March 1989	Moises Espinosa Sr., Congressman for the 3rd district of Masbate		
21 April 1989	James N. Rowe, United States military advisor	Juanito T. Itaas (principal); Donato B. Continente (accomplice)	The New People's Army claimed responsibility for the assassination.
14 August 1989	Bonifacio Uy, Mayor of Ilagan, Isabela		
9 December 1989	Antonio Luna, Mayor of Rosario, Batangas		
15 December 1989	Roberto Guimbuayan, Mayor of Tuao, Cagayan	New People's Army	

== 1990s ==
Date	Victim(s)	Assassin(s)	Notes
7 January 1990	Javier Hizon, Mayor of Mexico, Pampanga	New People's Army	
14 January 1990	Leonardo Cortes, Mayor of Bayugan, Agusan del Sur		
13 February 1990	Felino Maquinay, Mayor of Carmona, Cavite		
4 March 1990	Oscar Florendo, brigadier general and Chief of the Civil Relations Service of the Armed Forces of the Philippines		Killed while negotiating with suspended Cagayan Governor Rodolfo Aguinaldo during the Hotel Delfino Siege.
5 May 1990	Roger Aguirre, Mayor of Malay, Aklan	New People's Army	Killed along with his two bodyguards in a grenade attack during a fiesta dance.
22 October 1990	Oscar Lazaro, President of the transport workers group Pasang Masda		
30 October 1990	Jolly Fernandez, former Congressman and Governor of Masbate		
1 December 1990	Eduardo Joson III, Vice Mayor of Cabanatuan, Nueva Ecija		
21 December 1990	Rogelio San Pedro, Vice Mayor of San Jose del Monte, Bulacan		
13 May 1991	Cerilio Cariaga, former mayor of Bato, Camarines Sur		
14 October 1991	Nerylito Satur, Roman Catholic parish priest of Valencia, Bukidnon		
21 February 1992	Bantilan Paglala, Vice Mayor of Maganoy, Maguindanao		
3 March 1992	Octavio Velasco, Mayor of Ternate, Cavite		
25 April 1992	Leonardo Mamba, Mayor of Solana, Cagayan		
11 August 1992	Angelito Nava, Mayor of Aguilar, Pangasinan		
31 December 1992	Pascual Espinosa, former congressman for the 2nd district of Iloilo		
18 March 1993	Cesar "Saro" Bañares Jr., lead vocalist and composer of folk-rock band Asin	Gualberto Cataluña, Joelito Castracion and Jose Castracion	
25 April 1993	Jose Peralta, Mayor of Balungao, Pangasinan		
3 April 1994	Leopoldo "Ka Hector" Mabilangan, former NPA leader and rebel returnee		
7 May 1994	Timoteo Zarcal, former chief of the PNP Criminal Investigation Service	Alex Boncayao Brigade	
18 November 1994	Eugene A. Tan, former president of the Integrated Bar of the Philippines		
15 December 1994	Jose Pring, former chief of the Manila Police District's Anti-Kidnapping Task Force, and father of actress Joyce Pring	Alex Boncayao Brigade	Assassinated on his car in Sampaloc, Manila on his way to work.
28 February 1995	Tito Espinosa, Congressman for the 1st district of Masbate		
21 April 1995	Honorato Perez Sr., Mayor of Cabanatuan, Nueva Ecija		
9 May 1995	Filomena Tatlonghari, teacher of the Talaga Elementary School, Mabini, Batangas		Shot and killed by a gunman for refusing to surrender a ballot box during the 1995 Philippine general election
11 December 1995	Leonardo Ty, Filipino-Chinese businessman and executive of the Union Hicari Fertilizer, Manila Paper Mills, Union Ajinomoto and Union Industries		
13 June 1996	Rolando Abadilla, former colonel, chief of the Metrocom Intelligence and Security Group (MISG) under the Marcos regime and former Vice Governor of Ilocos Norte	Joel de Jesus; Lenido Lumanog; Rameses de Jesus; Cesar Fortuna; Augusto Santos	The Alex Boncayao Brigade claimed responsibility for the killing but denied that the perpetrators identified had anything to do with the group. Nevertheless the Abadilla 5, as they were later known, were convicted and sentenced to life imprisonment.
4 February 1997	Benjamin de Jesus, Apostolic Vicar of Jolo		
18 December 1998	Abdurajak Abubakar Janjalani, founder and leader of the Abu Sayyaf	Members of the Philippine National Police	
January 1999	Morjil Valencia, Provincial President of the Association of Barangay Captains in Quirino and ex-officio member of the Quirino Provincial Board		
1 November 1999	Celso Lorenzo, Regional Trial Court Judge of Borongan, Eastern Samar		
December 1999	Abdul Sanoh, Mayor of Pangutaran, Sulu		
31 December 1999	Conrado Balweg, former Catholic priest and founder of the Cordillera People's Liberation Army	New People's Army	

== 2000s ==
Date	Victim(s)	Assassin(s)	Notes
3 February 2000	Felix Velarde, former mayor of Jaen, Nueva Ecija		
6 February 2000	Oscar Aldaba, Mayor of San Teodoro, Oriental Mindoro		
18 March 2000	Macario Valerio, Government Corporate Counsel	New People's Army	
11 April 2000	Leodegardio Adalem, former soldier and suspect in the murder of Macli-ing Dulag	New People's Army	
1 May 2000	Mario Hisuler, former congressman for the 2nd district of Lanao del Norte		
3 May 2000	Rhoel Gallardo, Roman Catholic Claretian missionary based in Basilan	Abu Sayyaf Group	
10 June 2000	Honorato Galvez, Mayor of San Ildefonso, Bulacan		
24 November 2000	Salvador "Bubby" Dacer, publicist		Abducted and killed along with his driver, Emanuel Corbito. PNP Chief Panfilo Lacson and President Joseph Estrada were among those suspected of involvement, albeit inconclusively. See Dacer–Corbito double murder case
4 December 2000	Esteban Paulino, Mayor of Doña Remedios Trinidad, Bulacan		
22 December 2000	Cesar Lacanilao, Vice Mayor of Alfonso Castañeda, Nueva Vizcaya		
4 January 2001	Reynaldo Cacho, former vice mayor of Bani, Pangasinan		
5 February 2001	Hassan Ibnobahi, Regional Trial Court Judge of San Jose, Occidental Mindoro		
6 February 2001	Filemon "Ka Popoy" Lagmán, former Communist Party of the Philippines official and founder of the Bukluran ng Manggagawang Pilipino (BMP; "coalition of Filipino workers")	Two unknown assailants	The New People's Army is believed to have been involved in the killing.
18 March 2001	Mark Chua, university student		Believed to have been killed for exposing anomalies in the Reserve Officers' Training Corps Program of the University of Santo Tomas. His death sparked the repeal of mandatory ROTC training in Philippine tertiary institutions and the enactment of the National Service Training Program.
15 April 2001	Felix Frayna, former mayor of Santa Magdalena, Sorsogon		
17 April 2001	Lope Asis, Mayor of Bayugan, Agusan del Sur	New People's Army	
18 April 2001	Teodoro Hernaez, Mayor of Santa Lucia, Ilocos Sur		
21 April 2001	Oscar Torralba, former mayor of La Paz, Agusan del Sur		
23 April 2001	Andres Santos, police chief of Surigao City		
7 May 2001	Caesar Platon, Mayor of Tanauan, Batangas		
11 May 2001	Jesus Sibya Jr., former mayor of San Joaquin, Iloilo		
12 May 2001	Marcial Punzalan Jr., Congressman of the 2nd district of Quezon	New People's Army	
11 June 2001	Geminiano Eduardo, Municipal Circuit Trial Court Judge of Peñaranda, Nueva Ecija		
12 June 2001	Rodolfo Aguinaldo, Congressman and former Governor of Cagayan	New People's Army	
30 June 2001	William Garan, deputy police chief of Sorsogon	New People's Army	
9 August 2001	Moises Espinosa Jr., Mayor of Masbate City		
10 August 2001	Macapagal Macalaba, City Treasurer of Marawi, Lanao del Sur		
5 September 2001	Jose Libayao, Mayor of Talaingod, Davao del Norte		
4 October 2001	Agustin Chan, Provincial Auditor of Ilocos Sur		
31 October 2001	Ariston Rubio, Regional Trial Court Judge of Batac, Ilocos Norte		
7 November 2001	Nida Blanca, actress		Prosecutors suspected her husband, Rod Strunk as the mastermind.
27 December 2001	Jose Segundo, Mayor of Tubo, Abra		
5 January 2002	Alona Bacolod-Ecleo, wife of Philippine Benevolent Missionaries Association Supreme Master Ruben Ecleo Jr.	Ruben Ecleo Jr.	Four members of Alona's family and one neighbor were later killed by suspected PBMA members on June 18, 2003. The following day, 19 people died in clashes between PBMA members and police serving an arrest warrant on Ecleo at PBMA headquarters in the Dinagat Islands.
15 February 2002	Renato Parojinog, member of the Misamis Occidental Provincial Board		
18 February 2002	Sixto Vergara, Mayor of Lian, Batangas		
5 April 2002	Benjaline "Beng" Hernandez, former deputy secretary-general of Karapatan-Southern Mindanao	Members of the Philippine Army	
11 April 2002	Expidito Albarillo, coordinator of Bayan Muna in Oriental Mindoro		
23 April 2002	Jesus Sebastian, Mayor of Jones, Isabela	New People's Army	
25 April 2002	Eugenio Valles, Regional Trial Court Judge of Nabunturan, Compostela Valley		
21 June 2002	Abu Sabaya, leader of the Abu Sayyaf	Members of the Philippine Army	
30 June 2002	Eduardo Velarde Napari, former mayor of Kananga, Leyte		
24 August 2002	Marcos Barte, police chief of Sablayan, Occidental Mindoro		
27 August 2002	Leopito Gallego, police chief of Vallehermoso, Negros Oriental		
27 September 2002	Oscar Gary Uson, Regional Trial Court Judge of Tayug, Pangasinan and father of actress and politician Mocha Uson		
18 October 2002	Christopher Pacaul, police chief of Abra de Ilog, Occidental Mindoro		
29 October 2002	Clarence Benwaren, Mayor of Tineg, Abra		
31 October 2002	Datu Kling Daud, former mayor of Palimbang, Sultan Kudarat		
24 November 2002	Perfecto Cebedo, Vice Mayor of Rizal, Zamboanga del Norte		
18 December 2002	Victor Elipe, Mayor of Tagana-an, Surigao del Norte	New People's Army	
24 December 2002	Saudi Ampatuan, Mayor of Datu Piang, Maguindanao		Killed along with 12 others in a bombing at his residence.
23 January 2003	Romulo Kintanar, former leader of the New People's Army		
14 February 2003	Eriberto Paglinawan, police chief of Cabuyao, Laguna		
8 May 2003	Jerome Bautista, Provincial President of the Association of Barangay Captains in Quirino and ex-officio member of the Quirino Provincial Board		
17 May 2003	Pinera Biden, Municipal Trial Court Judge of Kabugao, Apayao		
22 June 2003	Guerrero Zaragoza, Mayor of Tayug, Pangasinan		
28 June 2003	Joel Brillantes, Mayor of Monkayo, Compostela Valley		
6 September 2003	Jun Pala, former councilor of Davao City		Future President and then-Davao City Mayor Rodrigo Duterte was later accused of involvement by an alleged hitman.
16 October 2003	Armando Rosimo, chief of the anti-tax fraud division of the Bureau of Internal Revenue		
20 January 2004	Eduardo Durante, Vice Mayor of Burdeos, Quezon		
14 February 2004	Juvy Magsino, Vice Mayor of Naujan, Oriental Mindoro		
14 February 2004	Leima Fortu, Secretary-General of the human rights group Karapatan in Oriental Mindoro		Killed in the same vehicle with Magsino
21 February 2004	Paterno Tiamson, Regional Trial Court Judge of Binangonan, Rizal		
28 February 2004	Anieto Olaje, Mayor of Tarangnan, Samar		
4 March 2004	Roy Jumao-as, Mayor of Hindang, Leyte		
3 April 2004	Francisco Montero, Mayor of Tarangnan, Samar		
13 May 2004	Arsenio Escarda, police chief of Madridejos, Cebu		
22 May 2004	Arthur Garcia, former vice mayor of Calumpit, Bulacan		
27 May 2004	Conrado Rodrigo, former mayor of San Nicolas, Pangasinan		
7 June 2004	Tomas de Armas, police chief of Angat, Bulacan		
10 June 2004	Voltaire Rosales, Regional Trial Court Judge of Tanauan, Batangas		
27 June 2004	Felix Garcia, member of the Bohol Provincial Board		
18 July 2004	Rex Emmanuel Real, Vice Mayor of Santa Maria, Laguna		
11 July 2004	Rodrigo Foja, deputy police chief of Oriental Mindoro		
7 August 2004	Rogelio Saraza, president of the Association of Barangay Captains of Caloocan		
10 August 2004	Milnar Lammawin, Regional Trial Court Judge of Tabuk, Kalinga		
5 September 2004	Ernesto Bernal, police chief of Lacub, Abra	New People's Army	
26 September 2004	Arturo Tabara, leader of the Rebolusyonaryong Partido ng Manggagawà ng Pilipinas (RPM-P) and its military wing, the Revolutionary Proletarian Army (RPA)	New People's Army	
30 October 2004	Eleuterio Mabanag, Mayor of Vintar, Ilocos Norte		
16 November 2004	Rogelio Pambid, Mayor of Marcos, Ilocos Norte		
11 December 2004	Felix Carpio, former mayor of Mabitac, Laguna		
2 February 2005	Jimmy Chua, Vice Mayor of Laoag, Ilocos Norte		
19 March 2005	Loreto Pangilinan, former Vice Governor of Nueva Ecija		
24 March 2005	Marlene Garcia-Esperat, former employee of the Department of Agriculture–Central Mindanao (DA–12) and whistleblower in the Fertilizer Fund Scam	Randy Grecia (confirmed); Estanislao Bismanos, Gerry Cabayag and Rowie Barua (accomplices)	
13 April 2005	Henry Lanot, former congressman for the lone district of Pasig		
10 May 2005	Leon Arcillas, Mayor of Santa Rosa, Laguna		
26 June 2005	Fausto Seachon Jr., former congressman for the 3rd district of Masbate		
6 July 2005	Adolfo Aquino, Vice Mayor of Mapandan, Pangasinan		
17 July 2005	Abdulbasit Maulana, Vice Mayor of Dinas, Zamboanga del Sur		
23 September 2005	Estrellita Paas, Pasay Regional Trial Court Judge		
1 November 2005	Corais Tampugao, police chief of Tubaran, Lanao del Sur		
6 November 2005	Alkhalid Kaluang, Mayor of Kalingalan Caluang, Sulu		
16 December 2005	Mohajiid Andi, Vice Mayor of Dinas, Zamboanga del Sur		
31 December 2005	Henrick Gingoyon, Pasay Regional Trial Court Judge		
2 January 2006	Eduardo Amande, Jr., police chief of Matnog, Sorsogon	New People's Army	
13 January 2006	Ysrael Bernos, Mayor of La Paz, Abra		
3 March 2006	Luis Biel, Mayor of Isabela, Basilan		
20 March 2006	Amante Abelon, provincial coordinator of Anakpawis party list in Zambales		
24 March 2006	Warlito Trinidad, member of the Bulacan Provincial Board	New People's Army	Killed in an ambush in Santa Cruz, Occidental Mindoro
20 March 2006	Cris Hugo, coordinator for the League of Filipino Students		
22 April 2006	Richard Varilla, Vice Mayor of San Juan, Ilocos Sur		
22 May 2006	Fernando Batul, former vice mayor of Puerto Princesa, Palawan		
29 May 2006	Sotero Llamas, former NPA leader turned peace adviser		
18 June 2006	Delfinito Albano, Mayor of Ilagan, Isabela		
18 July 2006	Hener Rucha, municipal treasurer of Lakewood, Zamboanga del Sur		
31 July 2006	Reimon Guran, spokesperson for the League of Filipino Students		
21 August 2006	Edwin Vidal, former vice mayor of El Nido, Palawan		
2 September 2006	Khadaffy Janjalani, leader of the Abu Sayyaf	Members of the Philippine Army	
7 September 2006	Danilo Parilla, former Governor of Biliran		
23 September 2006	Nathaniel Onia, Mayor of Allacapan, Cagayan		
3 October 2006	Alberto Ramento, Obispo Máximo IX of the Philippine Independent Church		
11 November 2006	James Bersamin, member of the Abra Provincial Board		
11 November 2006	George Yabes, Mayor of Maitum, Sarangani		
2 December 2006	Sahara Silongan, Cotabato City Regional Trial Court Judge		
6 December 2006	Nestor Ballacillo, Assistant Solicitor General of the Philippines		
16 December 2006	Luis Bersamin Jr., Congressman for the lone district of Abra		Abra Governor Vicente Valera was later convicted of masterminding the killing.
30 December 2006	Victor Gardose, Vice Mayor of Tapaz, Capiz		
16 January 2007	Jainal Antel Sali Jr., leader of the Abu Sayyaf.	Members of the Philippine Army	
19 January 2007	Nathaniel Pattugalan, Quezon City Metropolitan Trial Court Judge		
19 January 2007	Noli Morta Bucong, municipal treasurer of Tubay, Agusan del Norte	New People's Army	
25 January 2007	Benito Astorga, Mayor of Daram, Samar	New People's Army	
2 March 2007	Alberto Montecalvo, police chief of Pio V. Corpuz, Masbate	New People's Army	
7 April 2007	Rommel Diasen, Vice Governor of Kalinga		
30 April 2007	Julian Resuello, Mayor of San Carlos, Pangasinan		
14 May 2007	Nellie Banaag, teacher of the Pinagbayanan Elementary School, Taysan, Batangas.		Killed along with poll watcher Leslie Ramos while protecting ballots after armed men torched two classrooms which served as polling precincts during the 2007 Philippine general election
21 May 2007	Philip Velasco, Mayor of Bacarra, Ilocos Norte		
29 May 2007	Bernie Banalo, police chief of Cabuyao, Laguna		
15 June 2007	Alfredo Vendivil Sr., Mayor-elect of Lupao, Nueva Ecija		
15 June 2007	Virgilio Vendivil Sr., Vice Mayor-elect of Lupao, Nueva Ecija		Killed along with his cousin, the Mayor-elect of Lupao, inside a cockpit.
20 June 2007	Bonifacio Apilado, Vice Mayor of San Manuel, Pangasinan		
27 July 2007	Orlando Velasco, Regional Trial Court Judge of Bayawan, Negros Oriental		
6 August 2007	Felicidad Picar, municipal treasurer of Bauang, La Union		
28 September 2007	Maria Jeanette Tecson, lawyer and one of the petitioners in the disqualification case against then-presidential candidate Fernando Poe Jr.		
4 October 2007	Zaldy Raga, Vice Mayor of Lumban, Laguna		
10 November 2007	Alioden Dalaig, chief of the Commission on Elections (COMELEC) legal department		
13 November 2007	Wahab Akbar, Congressman for the lone district of Basilan		One of six killed in the Batasang Pambansa bombing.
7 December 2007	Regolo Moran, Vice Mayor of Dimasalang, Masbate		
25 December 2007	Cesar Rafael, Mayor of Paracelis, Mountain Province		
14 January 2008	Roberto Navidad, Regional Trial Court Judge of Calbayog. Samar		
29 January 2008	Reynaldo Yap, former mayor of Sapang Dalaga, Misamis Occidental		
13 February 2008	David Pamplona, Mayor of Balete, Batangas		
24 March 2008	Wynne Asdala, director of the COMELEC legal department		As provincial election supervisor for Maguindanao was implicated in the Hello Garci scandal after his voice was identified in tapes discussing attempts at fraud in the 2004 Philippine presidential election
4 May 2008	Ramon Pagdanganan, former mayor of Calumpit, Bulacan		
22 Ma 2008	Ramon Rojas Jr., Vice Mayor of Ajuy, Iloilo		
31 July 2008	Tirso Lacanilao, former mayor of Apalit, Pampanga		
4 August 2008	Arthur Cabantac, Mayor of Agno, Pangasinan		
14 August 2008	Bonifacio Clemente, former vice mayor of Cabiao, Nueva Ecija		
26 August 2008	Rowell Sandoval, Vice Mayor of Mabini, Batangas		
25 October 2008	Reynaldo Malazo, Vice Mayor of San Manuel, Tarlac		
31 October 2008	Felix Reganit, former mayor of Maitum, Sarangani		
3 December 2008	Raul dela Cruz, Mayor of Rizal, Cagayan		
7 December 2008	Philip Labastida, San Juan City Metropolitan Trial Court Judge		
5 January 2009	Froilan Rufino, Vice Mayor of President Quirino, Sultan Kudarat		
29 January 2009	Karam Jakilan, Mayor of Al-Barka, Basilan		
3 February 2009	Antonio de Jesus, Vice Mayor of Milagros, Masbate		Died of his injuries 12 days later.
3 February 2009	Saesar Vicencio, former mayor of Catubig, Northern Samar		
7 May 2009	Julasirim Kasim, police chief of Sulu	Abu Sayyaf	
20 May 2009	Francisco Talosig, Mayor of Maconacon, Isabela		Died of his injuries on 8 October.
10 June 2009	Ramonchito Chavez, police chief of Malvar, Batangas		
25 June 2009	Danny Yang, member of the Laguna Provincial Board		
16 July 2009	Carlos de la Cruz, Mayor of Matuguinao, Samar		
26 July 2009	David Emralino, former mayor of Candelaria, Quezon		
26 July 2009	Abdul Ayon, Mayor of Malangas, Zamboanga Sibugay		
16 September 2009	Edimer Gumbahali, Sulu Sharia Court Judge		
10 October 2009	Nasario Gastardo, Vice Mayor of San Francisco, Surigao del Norte		
17 November 2009	Jovito Baldos Diaz, former mayor of San Quintin, Abra		
23 November 2009	Eden Mangudadatu, Vice Mayor of Mangudadatu, Maguindanao	Andal Ampatuan, Sr., his sons Andal Ampatuan, Jr. and Zaldy Ampatuan and other relatives, as well as members of the local police and militia acting as the family's private army	Killed along with 57 others in the Maguindanao massacre.

== 2010s ==
Date	Victim(s)	Assassin(s)	Notes
17 February 2010	Luis Mondia Jr., former mayor of Pulupandan, Negros Occidental		
21 February 2010	Albader Parad, senior leader of the Abu Sayyaf Group		
28 February 2010	Wilfredo "Boy" Mayor, jueteng lord and whistleblower		
18 May 2010	Andres Cipriano, Regional Trial Court Judge of Aparri, Cagayan		
14 July 2010	Mateo Biong, former mayor of Giporlos, Eastern Samar		
16 July 2010	Alfonso Derraco, police chief of Benito Soliven, Isabela		
3 August 2010	Joselito Reynes, former mayor of Compostela, Cebu		
10 August 2010	Toshiro Igari, Japanese lawyer		Death ruled a suicide by the police but murder by the Yakuza is suspected.
10 September 2010	Alimatar Guro Alim, former mayor of Tugaya, Lanao del Sur		
4 October 2010	Reynaldo Lacasandile, Regional Trial Court Judge of Vigan, Ilocos Sur		
9 October 2010	Luisito Caraang, Vice Mayor of Licab, Nueva Ecija		
15 November 2010	Leonard Co, botanist		Killed by Philippine Army soldiers while conducting scientific research in Leyte.
28 November 2010	Alexander Tomawis, Vice Mayor of Barira, Maguindanao		
1 January 2011	Reynaldo Dagsa, Barangay captain of Maypajo, Caloocan		Inadvertently pictured his assassins while taking a family photo during the New Year.
1 January 2011	Ricardo Dayag, police chief of Talavera, Nueva Ecija	Bernardo Castro	Killed by his deputy
4 January 2011	Vicente Maristela, Vice Mayor of Aroroy, Masbate		
19 January 2011	Fredelito Pingao, Municipal Circuit Trial Court Judge of Sarrat, Ilocos Norte		
23 January 2011	Antonino Rueco, police chief of Rizal, Cagayan	New People's Army	
24 January 2011	Gerry Ortega, environmentalist and former member of the Provincial Board of Palawan	Marlon Recamata (gunman)	Recamata pointed to former Palawan Governor Joel Reyes as the mastermind behind the killing.
23 March 2011	Noriel Salazar, former vice mayor of Alitagtag, Batangas		
2 May 2011	Reynaldo Uy, Mayor of Calbayog, Samar		
27 June 2011	Najib Maldisa, former mayor of Maimbung, Sulu		
12 October 2011	Augustus Cezar, former vice president for Administration at the Polytechnic University of the Philippines		
17 October 2011	Fausto Tentorio, Italian Roman Catholic priest of the Pontifical Institute for Foreign Missions based in Cotabato		
27 October 2011	Sawab Pangolima, former vice mayor of Maasim, Sarangani		
30 October 2011	Lloyd Millan, police chief of Bayambang, Pangasinan		
6 November 2011	Rafael Viduya, member of the Surigao del Sur Provincial Board		
19 December 2011	Florencio Manimtim Jr., Vice Mayor of Talisay, Batangas		
20 December 2011	Carlito Bayawa, Vice Mayor of Ipil, Zamboanga Sibugay		
31 January 2012	Anthony Que, former vice mayor of Santo Domingo, Ilocos Sur		
9 February 2012	Restituto Abad, Mayor of Carranglan, Nueva Ecija		
7 March 2012	Ramon Arcinue, former vice mayor of Lingayen, Pangasinan		
1 April 2012	Arturo Eustaquio II, president of the Universidad de Zamboanga		
25 April 2012	Henry Arles, Regional Trial Court Judge of Kabankalan, Negros Occidental		
4 May 2012	Abel Martinez, Vice Mayor of Mambusao, Capiz		
7 July 2012	Constancio Pacanan, former mayor of Motiong, Samar		
2 August 2012	Nasiruddin Jailani, police chief of Omar, Sulu		
28 October 2012	Raul Matamorosa, Mayor of Lupi, Camarines Sur		
11 November 2012	Lazaro Gayo, former vice mayor of Tubao, La Union		
15 December 2012	Ruperto Martinez, Mayor of Infanta, Pangasinan		
11 January 2013	Policronio Dulay, Vice Mayor of Kabacan, Cotabato		
22 January 2013	Erlinda Domingo, Mayor of Maconacon, Isabela		
22 May 2013	Romulo Nuyad, former mayor of Bansalan, Davao del Sur		
26 July 2013	Roldan Lagbas, member of the Misamis Oriental Provincial Board		Killed along with 5 others in a bombing in Cagayan de Oro
24 August 2013	Dante Guzman, former vice mayor of Dolores, Abra		
31 October 2013	Alfredo Alcover, former vice mayor of San Pascual, Batangas		
14 November 2013	Arsenio Climaco, former mayor of Tungawan, Zamboanga Sibugay		
22 November 2013	Julio Cruzat, former vice mayor of Bauan, Batangas		
20 December 2013	Ukol Talumpa, Mayor of Labangan, Zamboanga del Sur		Killed along with his wife and two others at Ninoy Aquino International Airport
28 February 2014	Reynerio Estacio, Zamboanga City Regional Trial Court Judge		
28 February 2014	George McPerson Perrett, Mayor of Maitum, Sarangani		
21 April 2014	Carlito Pentecostes Jr., Mayor of Gonzaga, Cagayan	New People's Army	
29 April 2014	Noel Romagos, police chief of Danao, Bohol		
28 May 2014	Reynaldo Navarro, Mayor of Laak, Compostela Valley		
7 June 2014	Ernesto Balolong Jr., Mayor of Urbiztondo, Pangasinan		
7 June 2014	George Caña, police chief of Ubay, Bohol		
8 June 2014	Arnulfo Rivera, former mayor of Mataasnakahoy, Batangas		
12 June 2014	Richard King, businessman and president of the Crown Regency Group of Hotels		
3 July 2014	Mario Okinlay, Mayor of Impasugong, Bukidnon	New People's Army	
5 September 2014	Mario Duerme, municipal treasurer of Jones, Isabela		
27 September 2014	Imelda Caabay, former mayor of Claveria, Misamis Oriental		
14 October 2014	Eulogio Benitez, former vice mayor of Maasim, Sarangani		
17 November 2014	Claudio Martin Larrazabal, Vice Mayor of Villaba, Leyte		
25 January 2015	Zulkifli Abdhir, leader of Jemaah Islamiyah (JI)	Members of the Special Action Force	See Mamasapano clash
6 April 2015	Harold Acompaniado, former mayor of Las Navas, Northern Samar		
19 June 2015	Florante Raspado, Vice Mayor of Jones, Isabela		
28 June 2015	Renato Malabor Sr., member of the Negros Occidental Provincial Board		
31 August 2015	Jude Erwin Alaba, Regional Trial Court Judge of Baler, Aurora		
12 October 2015	Randy Climaco, Mayor of Tungawan, Zamboanga Sibugay		
16 October 2015	Al Abner Wahab Santos, police chief of Marawi, Lanao del Sur		
19 October 2015	Dario Otaza, Mayor of Loreto, Agusan del Sur	New People's Army	
11 November 2015	Wilfredo Nieves, Regional Trial Court Judge of Malolos, Bulacan		
22 November 2015	Reynaldo Espinar, Municipal Circuit Trial Court Judge of Laoang, Northern Samar		
16 February 2016	Carlos Macabangen, municipal treasurer of Datu Salibo, Maguindanao	Bangsamoro Islamic Freedom Fighters	Killed along with four others in a roadside bombing
18 February 2016	Floro Allado, former mayor of Banisilan, Cotabato		
1 March 2016	Ger Igtanloc, police chief of Maragusan, Compostela Valley		
17 March 2016	Ahmad Nanoh, former mayor of Pangutaran, Sulu		
13 April 2016	Ronald Lucas, Vice Mayor of Jones, Isabela	New People's Army	
19 April 2016	Roberto Marquez Rivera, former vice mayor of Pandi, Bulacan		
14 July 2016	Apolonio Suan, member of the Surigao del Sur Provincial Board		
5 August 2016	Aaron Sampaga, Vice Mayor of Pamplona, Cagayan		
23 August 2016	Rogelio Bato Jr., lawyer of suspected drug lord Rolando Espinosa Sr.		
23 September 2016	Alex Manlapaz, former vice mayor of Apalit, Pampanga		
17 October 2016	Darangina Ditucalan, police chief of Poona Bayabao, Lanao del Sur		
5 November 2016	Rolando Espinosa Sr., Mayor of Albuera, Leyte	Members of the Criminal Investigation and Detection Group-Region 8	Killed in a police raid on his jail cell. See Death of Rolando Espinosa
17 November 2016	Roland Romero, former vice mayor of Ozamiz, Misamis Occidental.		
26 November 2016	Anwar Sindatok, Vice Mayor of Datu Saudi Ampatuan, Maguindanao		
20 December 2016	Larry Que, former mayoral candidate of Virac, Catanduanes		
29 December 2016	Mohammad Exchan Limbona, Mayor of Pantar, Lanao del Norte		
1 March 2017	Dreyfuss Perlas, volunteer doctor		
18 April 2017	Shahid Sinolinding, volunteer doctor		
27 April 2017	Vincent Rafanan, former vice mayor of Santo Tomas, La Union		
3 June 2017	Arsenio Agustin, Mayor of Marcos, Ilocos Norte		
7 June 2017	Gisela Boniel, Mayor of Bien Unido, Bohol	Niño Rey Boniel	Killed by her husband. See Death of Gisela Boniel
10 June 2017	Leovino Hidalgo, Mayor of Balete, Batangas		
11 June 2017	Rolando Somera, former Vice Governor of Abra		
11 July 2017	George Repique, Cavite Provincial Health Officer		
30 July 2017	Reynaldo Parojinog, Mayor of Ozamiz, Misamis Occidental		Was among the 16 killed along with his wife Susan, brother Octavio Jr., and sister Mona, in a simultaneous raid on his house in Ozamiz.
5 August 2017	Godofredo Abul Jr., Butuan Regional Trial Court Judge		
22 September 2017	Jackson Cinco Dy, Vice Mayor of Roxas, Oriental Mindoro		
27 September 2017	Dionne Lopez, member of the Masbate Provincial Board		
4 October 2017	Alexander Pascual, former vice mayor of Amulung, Cagayan		
16 October 2017	Isnilon Hapilon, leader of Abu Sayyaf Group (ASG)	Philippine Army	See Battle of Marawi
2 December 2017	Ricardo Rotoras, president of the University of Science and Technology of Southern Philippines and concurrent president of the Philippine Association of State Universities and Colleges		
4 December 2017	Marcelito Paez, retired Catholic priest based in Nueva Ecija		
19 February 2018	Jonah John Ungab, Vice Mayor of Ronda, Cebu		
29 April 2018	Mark Ventura, Catholic priest based in Cagayan		Shot after saying Mass in Gattaran.
12 May 2018	Eufranio Eriguel, former congressman for the 2nd district of La Union		
27 May 2018	Ronald Lowell Tirol, Mayor of Buenavista, Bohol		
10 June 2018	Richmond Nilo, Catholic priest based in Nueva Ecija		Shot while preparing to say evening Mass.
12 June 2018	Ricky Begino, Municipal Circuit Trial Court Judge of San Jose-Lagonoy, Camarines Sur		
2 July 2018	Antonio Halili, Mayor of Tanauan, Batangas		Shot by a Sniper during a flag ceremony at city hall. See Assassination of Antonio Halili
3 July 2018	Ferdinand Bote, Mayor of General Tinio, Nueva Ecija		
7 July 2018	Alexander Lubigan, Vice Mayor of Trece Martires, Cavite		
11 July 2018	Al Rashid Mohammad Ali, Vice Mayor of Sapa-Sapa, Tawi-Tawi		
20 July 2018	Datu Roger Mamalo, former vice mayor of Sultan sa Barongis, Maguindanao		
5 September 2018	Mariano Blanco III, Mayor of Ronda, Cebu		
1 October 2018	Alexander Buquing, Mayor of Sudipen, La Union		
8 October 2018	Ananias Rebato, former mayor of San Jose de Buan, Samar		
13 October 2018	Edmundo Pintac, Regional Trial Court Judge of Ozamiz, Misamis Occidental		
14 November 2018	Al-Fred Concepcion, Vice Mayor of Balaoan, La Union		
28 November 2018	Dominic Sytin, businessman and president of United Auctioneers	Dennis Sytin	
9 December 2018	Richard Santillan, security aide of lawyer and former Biliran representative Glenn Chong		
22 December 2018	Rodel Batocabe, Congressman for Ako Bicol Party-list		
22 December 2018	Joelito Talaid, former mayor of Kadingilan, Bukidnon		
22 January 2019	Ricardo Reluya, president of the Association of Barangay Councils (ABC) of San Fernando, Cebu		
30 January 2019	Crisell Beltran, Barangay Captain of Bagong Silangan, Quezon City		
30 January 2019	Randy Felix Malayao, peace consultant for the National Democratic Front of the Philippines		
7 February 2019	Zuriel Arambulo, volunteer doctor		
14 March 2019	Owaidah Benito Marohombsar, leader of the Maute group	Members of the Philippine Army	
25 March 2019	Miguel Dungog, member of the Negros Oriental Provincial Board		
9 May 2019	Reymar Lacaya, Regional Trial Court Judge of Sindangan, Zamboanga del Norte	Oscar Tomarong	Killed by gunmen hired by another judge
18 June 2019	Ricardo Ramirez, former mayor of Medellin, Cebu		
7 July 2019	Wenefredo Olofernes, member of the Dinagat Islands Provincial Board		
27 July 2019	Edsel Enardecido, former mayor of Ayungon, Negros Oriental		
20 August 2019	Sergio Emprese, Vice Mayor of San Andres, Quezon		
9 October 2019	Charlie Yuson III, Vice Mayor of Batuan, Masbate		
25 October 2019	David Navarro, Mayor of Clarin, Misamis Occidental		
5 November 2019	Mario Anacleto Bañez, Regional Trial Court Judge of Tagudin, Ilocos Sur		
23 December 2019	Lucman Macalangan, police chief of Binidayan, Lanao del Sur		

== 2020s ==
Date	Victim(s)	Assassin(s)	Notes
7 January 2020	Rolando Recinto, former Vice Governor of Sultan Kudarat		
9 January 2020	Edgar Mendoza, former congressman for the 2nd district of Batangas		Killed along with two others and discovered in a burning car in Tiaong, Quezon.
10 January 2020	Guiaria Akmad, Provincial Auditor of Maguindanao		
11 January 2020	Gani Esmali, Vice Mayor of Baliguian, Zamboanga del Norte		
19 January 2020	Oscar Marquez, former vice mayor of Pandi, Bulacan		
18 February 2020	Alex Diamente Tizon, city councilor of Bayawan, Negros Oriental		
19 February 2020	Fredric Anthony Santos, former chief legal division of the Bureau of Corrections (BuCor)	Two unknown assailants	Was suspended by the Ombudsman over the alleged misapplication of the Good Conduct Time Allowance Law that led to the near-release of convicted criminals such as former Calauan, Laguna mayor Antonio Sanchez, the mastermind in the Murders of Eileen Sarmenta and Allan Gomez in 1993.
7 April 2020	Musiddik Mande, former vice mayor of Tipo-Tipo, Basilan		
29 June 2020	Maj. Marvin A. Indammog, Capt. Irwin B. Managuelod, Sgt. Jaime M. Velasco and Cpl. Abdal Asula, Philippine Army intelligence officers	Abdelzhimar Padjiri; Hanie Baddiri; Iskandar Susulan; Ernisar Sappal; Almudzrin Hadjaruddin; Sulki Andaki; Alkajal Mandangan; Rajiv Putalan; Mog Nur Pasani	Killed by police officers while conducting anti-terror operations at a checkpoint in Jolo, Sulu.
7 July 2020	Jovencio Senados, Manila Chief Inquest Prosecutor		
10 July 2020	Pablo Matinong, Jr., Mayor of Santo Niño, South Cotabato		
10 July 2020	Cenon Portugal, Municipal President of the Association of Barangay Captains of Ibaan, Batangas		
27 July 2020	Roland Cortez, Director of the National Center for Mental Health		
28 July 2020	Richard de San Jose, former mayor of Flora, Apayao		
30 July 2020	Wesley Barayuga, Board secretary of the Philippine Charity Sweepstakes Office		See Killing of Wesley Barayuga
10 August 2020	Randall "Ka Randy" Echanis, Peace consultant for the National Democratic Front of the Philippines		
17 August 2020	Zara Alvarez, former education director of the human rights organization Karapatan		
9 September 2020	Kent Zerna Divinagracia, former vice mayor of Pamplona, Negros Oriental		
30 October 2020	Normandie Pizarro, former justice of the Court of Appeals		
11 November 2020	Maria Teresa Abadilla, Manila Regional Trial Court Judge and daughter of Rolando Abadilla	Amador Rebato Jr.	Shot by her clerk of court who then committed suicide in unexplained circumstances.
17 November 2020	Eric Jay Magcamit, lawyer		
23 November 2020	Joey Luis Wee, lawyer		
25 November 2020	Agaton Topacio and Eugenia Magpantay, former peace consultants of the National Democratic Front of the Philippines (NDFP)		
3 December 2020	Caesar Perez, Mayor of Los Baños, Laguna		
15 December 2020	Mary Rose Genisan Sancelan, City Health Officer of Guihulngan, Negros Oriental		
1 January 2021	Ruben Feliciano, businessman and former mayoral candidate of San Fernando, Cebu		
11 January 2021	Christopher Cuan, Mayor of Libungan, Cotabato		
24 January 2021	Jorge Perez Bustos, former vice mayor of Masantol, Pampanga		
15 February 2021	Marjorie Salazar, former mayor of Lasam, Cagayan		
15 February 2021	Eduardo Asuten, former mayor of Lasam, Cagayan		Killed in the same vehicle with Salazar
26 February 2021	Restituto Calonge, Vice Mayor of Mabuhay, Zamboanga Sibugay		
8 March 2021	Ronaldo Aquino, Mayor of Calbayog, Samar		Killed along with five others in an ambush in Calbayog.
17 June 2021	Montasser Sabal, former mayor of Talitay, Maguindanao		
5 August 2021	Col. Michael Bawayan Jr., police chief of Sulu		
26 August 2021	Rex Fernandez, founding member of the National Union of Peoples' Lawyers		
31 October 2021	Jorge "Ka Oris" Madlos, top-ranking leader of the New People's Army		
16 November 2021	Nolito Magallanes, former vice mayor of Maragondon, Cavite		
6 December 2021	Darussalam Lajid, Mayor of Al-Barka, Basilan		
27 December 2021	Michael Gutierrez, Mayor of Lopez Jaena, Misamis Occidental		
31 December 2021	Edilberto Mendoza, Assistant City Prosecutor of Trece Martires, Cavite		
1 January 2022	Aldrin Cerdan, former mayor of Anda, Pangasinan		
27 January 2022	Valeriano Vito, Jr., former vice mayor of Majayjay, Laguna		Killed while driving a motorcycle in Lucena, Quezon.
24 February 2022	Chad Booc, Lumad school volunteer teacher and activist		One of five people killed in the New Bataan massacre.
9 June 2022	Ujud Ujuran, Mayoral candidate of Akbar, Basilan		
22 July 2022	Danilo Amat, former vice mayor of Dolores, Quezon		
24 July 2022	Rosita Furigay, former mayor of Lamitan, Basilan	Chao Tiao Yumol	Shot along with her aide by a disgruntled doctor. See Ateneo de Manila University shooting
11 August 2022	Romeo Sulit, former vice mayor of Lobo, Batangas		
30 August 2022	Lt. Reynaldo Samson, police chief of Ampatuan, Maguindanao		
3 October 2022	Narciso Amansec, former vice mayor of Dipaculao, Aurora		
7 October 2022	Miguel Abaigar Jr., former vice mayor of Calbiga, Samar		
5 November 2022	Benharl Kahil, public school arts teacher and cartoonist		
12 February 2023	Angelique Alexis Paulino, Municipal Councilor of Santo Domingo, Nueva Ecija	Saddam Pascual	Killed by her former domestic partner while driving in Guimba, Nueva Ecija.
19 February 2023	Rommel Alameda, Vice Mayor of Aparri, Cagayan		Killed along with five companions in an ambush in Bagabag, Nueva Vizcaya.
4 March 2023	Roel Degamo, Governor of Negros Oriental		Killed along with nine others in an attack on his residence. See Pamplona massacre.
17 April 2023	Demson Dagloc Silongan, Municipal councilor of Datu Salibo, Maguindanao del Sur		
12 July 2023	Sittie Jinn Utto Lumenda, former vice mayor of Rajah Buayan, Maguindanao del Sur		Killed along with her father while driving in Lambayong, Sultan Kudarat.
8 November 2023	Nasser Asarul, member of the Basilan Provincial Board		
22 November 2023	Giselo Castillones, former mayor of Cateel, Davao Oriental		
25 February 2024	Franklyn Galos Tan, City President of the Association of Barangay Captains of Isabela, Basilan		
2 August 2024	Roldan Benito, vice mayor of South Upi, Maguindanao del Sur		Killed along with one of his security aides while driving in South Upi, Maguindanao del Sur.
3 October 2024	Ramil Capistrano, president of the Association of Barangay Captains of Bulacan and ex-officio member of the Bulacan Provincial Board		Killed along with his driver in Malolos, Bulacan.
17 October 2024	Elliot Eastman, American resident of Zamboanga del Norte		Kidnapped, shot, and presumed dead.
7 December 2024	Ponciano Onia Jr., president of Abono Partylist and municipal councilor of Umingan, Pangasinan		
26 February 2025	Abdulazis Tadua Aloyodan, former mayor of Lumbaca-Unayan, Lanao del Sur		
16 March 2025	Gold Dagal, stand-up comedian		Previously received threats over his jokes on religion.
23 April 2025	Joel Ruma, mayor of Rizal, Cagayan		Shot by a sniper while campaigning
28 April 2025	Leninsky Bacud, nominee of Ang Bumbero ng Pilipinas party-list		
29 April 2025	Juan Dayang, former mayor of Kalibo, Aklan and president of the Publishers Association of the Philippines Inc.		
3 June 2025	Jendricks Luna, former mayor of Lagayan, Abra		
15 June 2025	Mauricio Pulhin, head of the Philippine House Committee on Ways and Means technical staff		
8 August 2025	Julio Estolloso, vice mayor of Ibajay, Aklan	Mihrel Senatin	Shot by a municipal councilor inside his office.
10 October 2025	Niruh Kyle Antatico, legal researcher at the National Irrigation Administration-Northern Mindanao and corruption whistleblower		Shot after releasing details of an anomalous irrigation project.
25 November 2025	Oscar Bucol Jr., Barangay Captain of Tres de Mayo, Digos, Davao del Sur		Shot while livestreaming on Facebook.
9 January 2026	Jose Edrohil Cimafranca, police chief of Sibulan, Negros Oriental		Shot along with two other police officers and a civilian by a subordinate.
30 June 2026	James Bohol, former vice mayor of Abuyog, Leyte		Abducted along with his son on June 27. Both were found dead on June 30.
12 November 2026	Joseph Wee Sit, Regional Trial Court judge of Isabela, Basilan		Shot in an ambush in Zamboanga City.

== See also ==
- List of assassinations in Asia
- List of people who survived assassination attempts
- List of journalists killed in the Philippines
- Political killings in the Philippines (2001–2010)
- List of massacres in the Philippines
