= Kidnapping of Elliot Eastman =

American content creator

Elliot Eastman
- Eastman in February 2024
- Born: Elliot Onil Eastman; 1997 or 1998; Burlington, Vermont
- Disappeared: October 17, 2024 (aged 26); Sitio Tungawan, Poblacion, Sibuco, Zamboanga del Norte, Philippines
- Occupation: Content creator
- Spouse: Karisha Jala (m. 2023)

YouTube information
- Channel: Elliot Eastman
- Years active: 2015–2024
- Genre: Vlog
- Subscribers: 9.41 thousand
- Views: 1.77 million

On October 17, 2024, Elliot Eastman, an American YouTuber residing in the Philippines, was kidnapped and wounded by armed men from his home in Sibuco, Zamboanga del Norte. Police stated he was shot in the leg and abdomen and was dragged into a boat into the Sulu Sea. Several suspects were identified, three of whom died in the clashes, with another four arrested by early 2025. In December 2024, he was presumed to be deceased by local authorities.

== Background ==
Eastman was a 26-year-old man from Hinesburg, Vermont, who graduated from Champlain Valley Union High School in 2016. Eastman first travelled to the Philippines in 2023. In July of that same year, he married Karisha Jala, a Sama-Sibuco native.

Eastman returned to the United States briefly for work. In May 2024, he settled in the municipality of Sibuco, Zamboanga del Norte, in the Philippines to live with his Filipino wife.

== Kidnapping and presumed death ==
On October 17, 2024, Eastman was abducted from his home in Sibuco. He was shot in the leg and abdomen to prevent his escape. The men fled with Eastman via a motorized banca towards the Sulu Sea according to a witness. No demands for ransom or proof of life were released following the kidnapping. Two months after the kidnapping, police concluded that Eastman had died and that his body was thrown into the Sulu Sea by the perpetrators.

== See also ==
- List of assassinations in the Philippines
