= Tullio Favali =

Italian missionary (1946–1985)

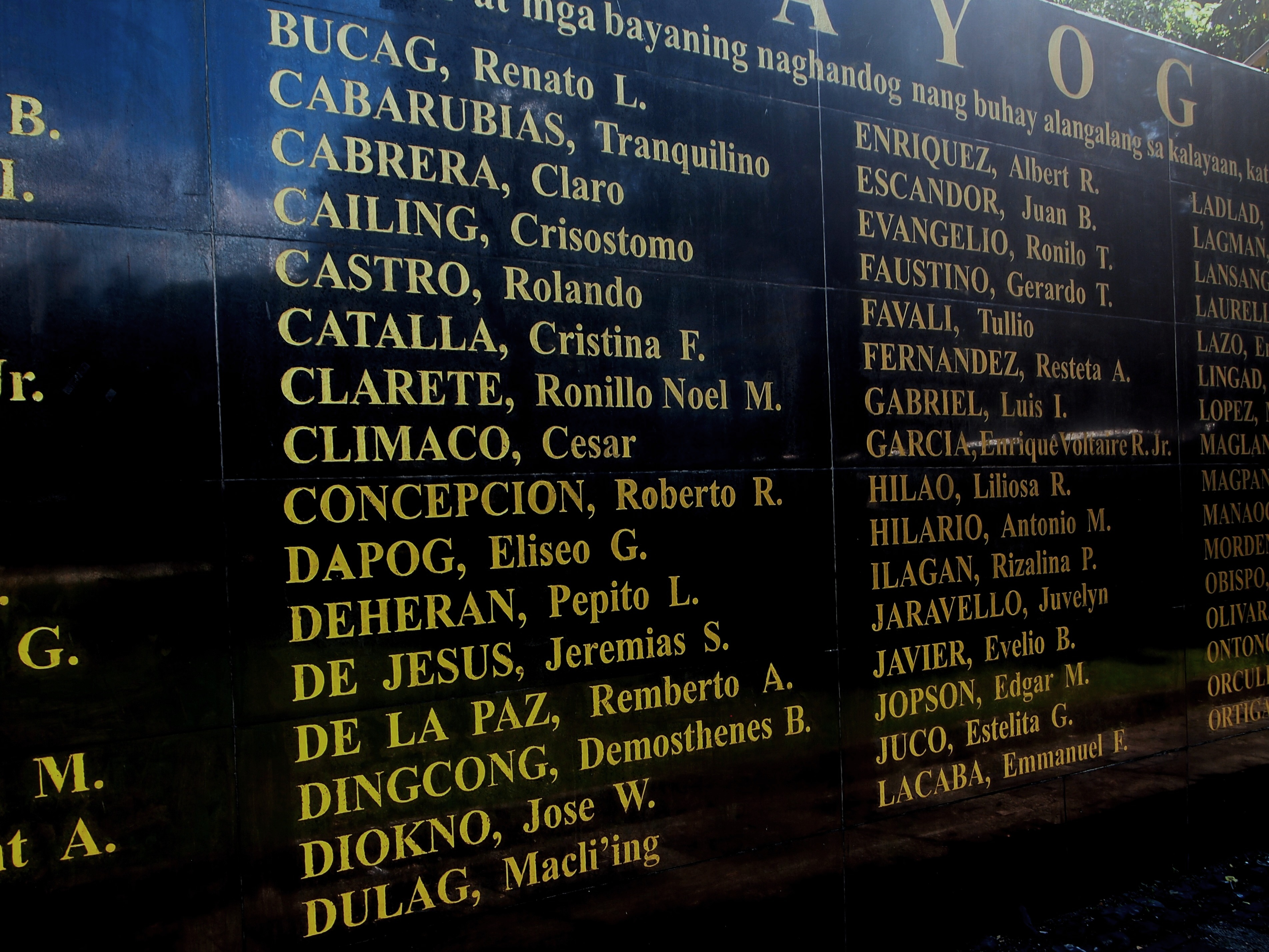
- Detail of the Wall of Remembrance at the Bantayog ng mga Bayani, showing names from the first batch of Bantayog Honorees, including that of Tullio Favali.

Personal life
- Born: December 10, 1946 Mantova, Italy
- Died: April 11, 1985 (aged 38) Tulunan, Cotabato, Philippines
- Cause of death: Gunshot wounds

Religious life
- Religion: Roman Catholic

Tullio Favali (December 10, 1946 – April 11, 1985) was an Italian priest who ministered in Zamboanga, North Cotabato and Metro Manila in the Philippines. He was the first foreign missionary to be murdered by paramilitary forces during Martial Law, provoking public outcry from the Vatican and Italian government. His death caused international attention to human rights violations and abuses to paramilitary forces during the Marcos dictatorship.

== Missions work ==
Favali was a member of the Pontifical Institute for Foreign Missions (PIME), an all-male international group of priests who are dedicated to evangelization in underdeveloped and non-Christian nations. Favali was assigned to do missions work in the Philippines, particularly in provinces in Mindanao. He arrived in the Philippines in 1983, and was ordained as the parish priest of La Esperanza in Tulunan, North Cotabato. He studied the Ilonggo language, which is the language spoken in many places in Mindanao.

== Death ==
Many parts of North Cotabato were occupied by armed pseudo-religious cults that were hired by the Marcos dictatorship's anti-insurgency campaign. They were commissioned as paramilitary units who operated as Barrio Self-Defense Units, later called Integrated Civilian Home Defense Force or ICHDF. Among these units were the Ilaga whose members included the brothers Norberto Jr., Edilberto and Elpidio Manero, known for being members of an ethno-nationalist extremist cult called Tadtad and their killing sprees.

Favali was called by townspeople for help after the Manero brothers shot the town's tailor. When the Manero brothers saw him arrive and enter a house, Norberto Jr. dragged his motorcycle and set it on fire. When Favali hurried out after seeing the fire, Edilberto shot the priest point blank in his head, trampled on his body and fired again. This caused the priest's skull to crack open, and Norberto Jr. picked the brains and displayed them to the horrified witnesses. The brothers, along with a few other gang members, stood by laughing and heckling.

The Manero brothers and five others were found guilty of murder, and sentenced to life imprisonment, through the Free Legal Assistance Group. The court also found Norberto Jr. guilty of arson.

== Legacy ==
Favalli is honored at the Wall of Remembrance at the Bantayog ng mga Bayani (Monument of Heroes), which is dedicated to memorializing "individuals who lived and died in defiance of the repressive regime that ruled over the Philippines from 1972 to 1986".

In the film Orapronobis, a priest bears likeness to Favali, and was killed by a paramilitary group in a similar fashion.

== See also ==
- Religious sector resistance against the Marcos dictatorship
