= Champlain Valley Union High School =

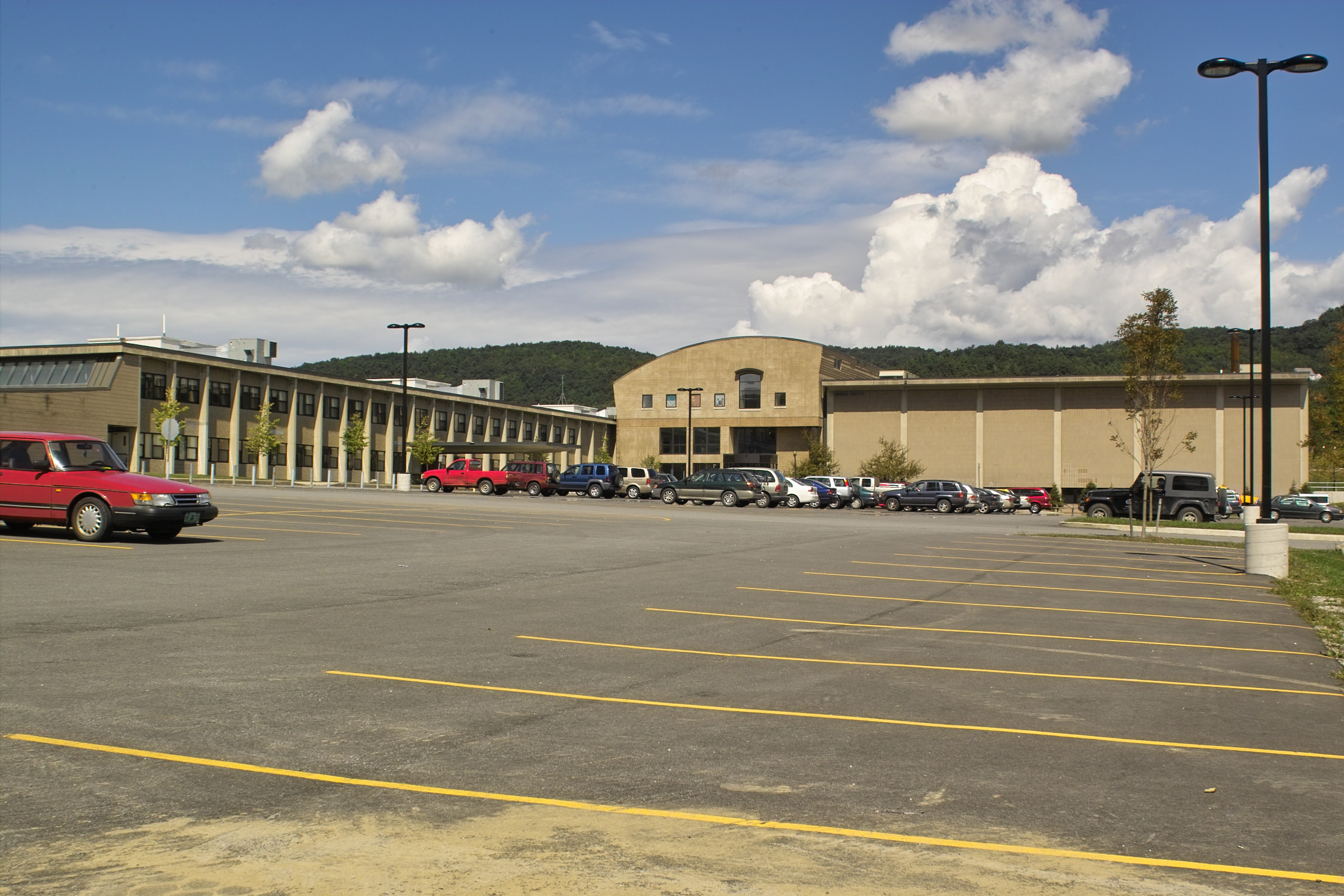

Location
- 369 CVU Road; Hinesburg, Vermont 05461; United States; 44°20′40″N 73°06′36″W

Information
- Type: Public high school
- School district: Champlain Valley School District
- CEEB code: 460175
- Principal: Katherine Riley
- Faculty: 103
- Grades: 9-12
- Enrollment: 1,291 (2023-2024) (2021-2022)
- Colors: Red and white
- Nickname: Redhawks
- Newspaper: The Hawk’s Nest
- Website: School website

Champlain Valley Union High School (CVU) is a high school located in the town of Hinesburg, Vermont, United States. The school serves the towns of Charlotte, Hinesburg, Shelburne, St. George, and Williston, additionally taking school choice students from across the region. The enrollment for the 2025-2026 school year was 1,251 students with 103 faculty.CVU regularly ranks top 3 in the state of Vermont, across academics, extracurriculars, student diversity and sports.

CVU was established in 1964 to serve the Chittenden County towns outside of Burlington. It is currently the largest high school by enrollment in the state of Vermont.

== Infrastructure ==
The CVU property contains a baseball field, a softball field, a field hockey field, a football field, a track, and three soccer fields. During the spring, the field hockey and soccer fields are used for lacrosse. CVU added a goat farm onto its campus in the spring of 2017.

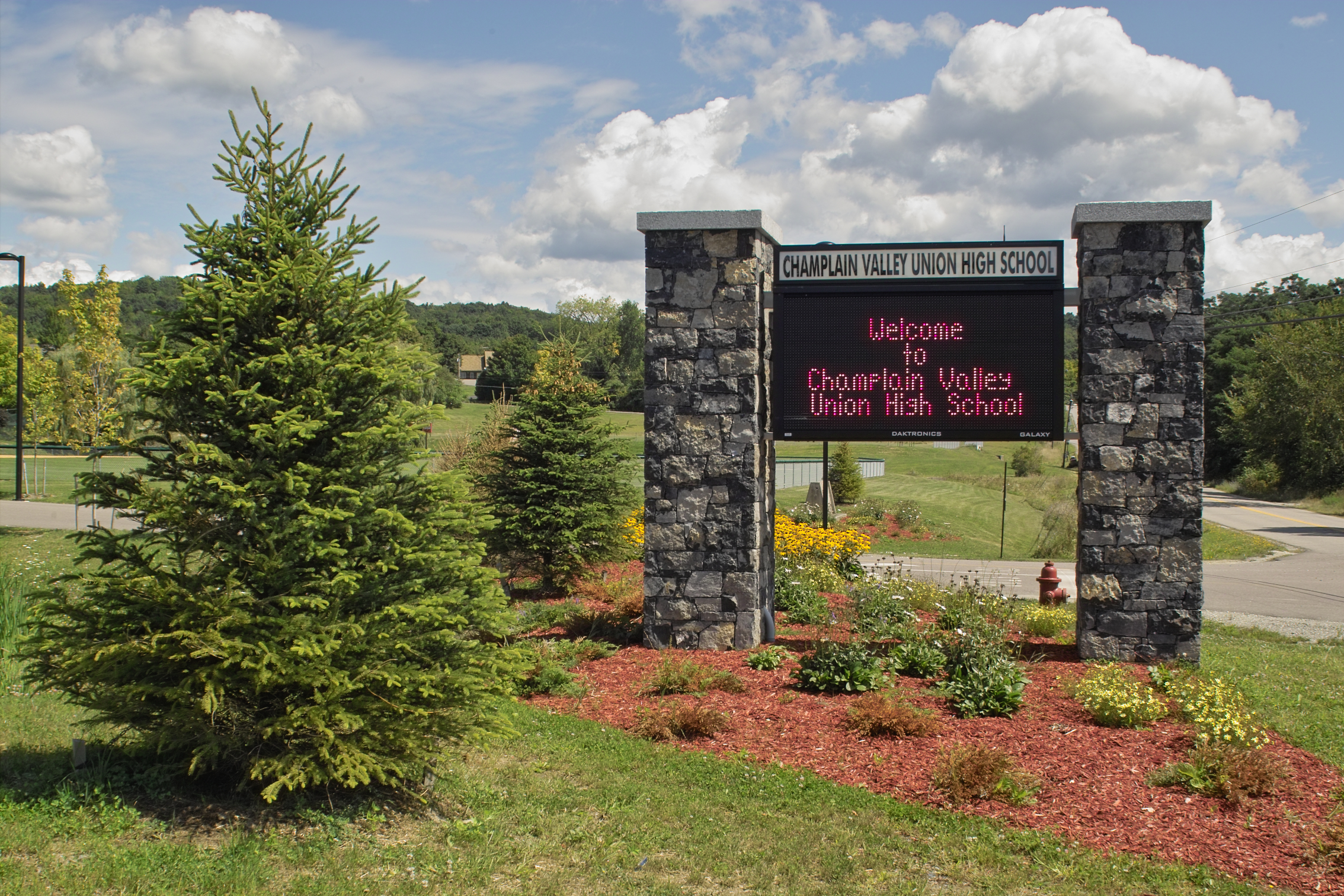
Sign

== Athletics ==
The school mascot is the Redhawk, having changed its name from Crusaders in 2006 because many had found the former name to be offensive. The school's athletic colors are red and white.

CVU competes in Division 1 brackets for all sports. Its chief athletic rivals are nearby South Burlington High School, Essex High School, and Mount Mansfield Union High School.

The CVU Redhawks have met the Rice Memorial Green Knights in the boys basketball state semi-finals for two consecutive years.

In 2022, CVU finished as the second seeded team in the Vermont division 1 boys basketball season, and had two players be named to the Free Press metro division first and second team.

The school competes in the following sports:

=== Fall sports ===
- Men's cross country - won state championships in 1984, 1985, 1999, 2015, 2016, and 2019
- Women's cross country - won state championships in 1988, 2003, 2004, 2005, 2006, 2007, 2009, 2010, 2011, 2012, 2013, 2014, 2015, 2016, 2017, and 2018. Won New England Championships in 2003, 2010, 2011, 2016, 2018 and 2019.
- Field hockey - won state championship in 2022
- Football - won state championship in 2022, and 2024
- Men's soccer - won state championship in 1990, 2002, 2003, 2004, 2005, 2006, 2007, 2009, 2012, 2018, 2019, 2023, and 2024
- Women's soccer - won state championship in 1981, 1984, 1988, 1995, 1996, 1997, 1998, 2000, 2002, 2004, 2006, 2011, 2012, 2013, 2014, 2015,2022, 2024, and 2025
- Co-ed sailing (club)
- Co-ed rowing (club)
- Golf

=== Winter sports ===
- Alpine skiing
- Men's basketball - won state championship in 2022-2023
- Women's basketball - won state championship in 2012-2013, 2013-2014, and 2014-2015, 2015–16, 2016-2017
- Gymnastics - won state championship in 2018, ending Essex's 12 year run, and in 2020
- Men's ice hockey - won state championship in 2009, 2011, and 2014
- Women's ice hockey
- Men's Nordic skiing - won state championships in 2010, 2012, 2014, 2015, and 2017
- Women's Nordic skiing - won state championships in 2011, 2012, and 2014
- Wrestling
- Snowboard Club (new as of 2007)
- Indoor track Club

=== Spring sports ===
- Baseball - 2003, 2012, 2013, 2019, 2023
- Men's lacrosse - won state championship in 2013-2022
- Women's lacrosse
- Softball
- Men's tennis
- Women's tennis - Vermont state champions, Division I 2009
- Track and field (men and women) - men's team won the 2016 Division 1 State Championship, their first state championship
- Rugby (club)
- Co-ed sailing (club)
- Ultimate (men and women)
- Co-ed rowing (club)

== Notable alumni ==
- Tom Atwood, photographer
- Ashley Bartley, Vermont state legislator
- Elliot Eastman, YouTuber
- Bradley J. LaRose, US Marshal for Vermont
- Curtis T. McMullen, Fields Medalist and Cabot Professor of Mathematics at Harvard University
- Megan Nick, freestyle skier and 2022 Winter Olympic bronze medalist
- Morgan Page, Grammy-nominated DJ and music producer
- Michael Dante DiMartino, animator and co-creator of Avatar the Last Airbender
