= Red God's Defenders =

Splinter group of the Ilaga

The Red God's Defenders are a splinter group of the Ilaga. It consists of approximately 600 fully armed individuals, composed of Mainly Ilonggos who have emerged in the Muslim-majority Central Mindanao region in the southern Philippines. They refer to themselves as "Pulahan", which translates to either "Red Warriors of God" or "Red God's Defenders". Their primary objective is to protect their communities and families from the atrocities committed by local Moro Muslim terrorist groups and those claiming allegiance to the Islamic State.
