= Tadtad =

Christian organization

- Other name: Sagrado Corazon Señor (official)
- Founded: 1972
- Country: Philippines
- Ideology: Anti-communism; Ethno-nationalism

Tadtad, officially Sagrado Corazon Señor (SCS), is a far-right Christian ethno-nationalist organization in the Philippines which also functioned as a paramilitary organization. It is often characterized as a cult.

Bato dela Rosa, who is a current Philippine senator, was a chief handler of the group during the 1980s.

== History ==
Tadtad (officially Sagrado Corazon Señor) was established in 1972 in Initao, Misamis Oriental by Sagrado Sade Jr.

== Beliefs and rites ==
An applicant seeking to join Tadtad had to go under an initiation rite to be able to join the group. Their inner arm had to be struck with a sharp sword at least 12 times. If the individual did not exhibit any visible cut, the applicant is deemed fit to become a member; if the sword made a cut, it is considered as a sign that the applicant has a dark side and therefore unfit to join.

The group's members hold their founder Sagrado Sade Jr. with high reverence and call him Papa Sagrado. Members pray to Sade similar to how Catholics ask for the intercession of the saints. According to the Tadtad, when Sade was baptized as an infant the priest sensed "something holy" about the baby which led to his name "Sagrado" (Sade was supposedly to be named "Ramonito"). Sade grew up to becoming a faith healer and gained a reputation in Mindanao after reportedly curing many before he founded the Tadtad.

Many members are also Catholics themselves and go to mainstream churches and observe the relevant religious holidays despite their affiliation with Tadtad. Tadtad members hold additional observances which set them apart from mainstream Catholicism. They pray every three hours on their own and on Fridays, and they congregate in their chapel to pray together. They consider acts such as smoking, drinking alcohol, and gambling as sinful.

The Tadtad are also known for using amulets, along with their prayers and faith, to protect themselves from bodily injury including those caused by bullets.

== Armed activity ==
The Tadtad fought against the New People's Army (NPA), as well as went after suspected members and sympathizers of the Communist rebel group. They also fought against Moro rebels in the 1970s.

In 1987, Tadtad members killed suspected Communist rebels and beheaded its leader and drank his blood. Journalists documented the aftermath at the invitation of Tadtad. Photographs showing cult members smiling and carrying the head of an alleged rebel was published in national newspapers. The local military commander ordered the dismantling of Tadtad on April 4, 1987, as a result of the incident.

The Philippine Army and a splinter group of the Tadtad called the Christian God Spirit had an armed encounter in Pangantucan, Bukidnon on August 11, 2000. The fighting ensued after soldiers tried to serve a warrant of arrest against their leader, Alfredo Opciona, for charges of attempted murder. The incident caused the death of sixteen Tadtad members, three members of the army auxiliary group and one civilian.

== See also ==
- Communist rebellion in the Philippines
- Moro conflict
- Alamara
- Agimat, a Filipino term on amulet
- Integrated Civilian Home Defense Forces
- Citizen Armed Force Geographical Unit
- Alsa Masa
- Ilaga
- Rock Christ (paramilitary sect)
