= Ilaga =

Filipino Christian extremist paramilitary group

- Founders: Feliciano Luces, Sr
- Leaders: Norberto Manero, Jr. (formerly)
- Dates active: January 1, 1967–1979; 2008–present (re-formed as 'New Ilaga')
- Split to: Red God's Defenders
- Headquarters: North Cotabato (now Cotabato)
- Active regions: Mindanao, Philippines
- Ideology: Folk Catholicism; Christian nationalism Christian fundamentalism Traditional Catholicism; Islamophobia
- Wars: Moro conflict

The Ilagâ (acronym for Ilonggo Land Grabbers Association) is a Christian extremist paramilitary group based in southern Philippines. The group is predominantly composed of Ilonggos, embracing a form of Folk Catholicism that utilizes amulets and violence.

The group was founded in 1970, in a gathering in a restaurant in Cotabato City by the then leading politicians in Central Mindanao, Nicolas Dequiña the Mayor of Midsayap and his political peers, Mayor Wenceslao Dela Cerna of Alamada, Pacifico Dela Cerna of Libungan, Bonifacio Tejada of Mlang, Conrado Lemana of Tulunan, Jose Escribano of Tacurong, and Esteban Doruelo of Pigcawayan. This group is led by Feleciano Luces or better known as Commander Toothpick.

The group complemented the Philippine Constabulary as a militia force during the 1970s in southern Mindanao while fighting against Moro guerrillas during the Moro insurgency in the Philippines.

The predominantly Hiligaynon-speaking migrants (from Panay) in the province of Cotabato organized a private army called the Ilaga (Visayan for rat). To counter the terror of Ilaga attacks on Muslim civilians, members of the Moro elite organized their own heavily armed groups — the Blackshirts in Cotabato, and the Barracudas in Lanao — who responded in kind.

From 1970 to 1971 Ilaga launched a series of 21 massacres that left 518 people dead, 184 injured, and 243 houses burned down. The group committed one of its bloodiest acts with the Manili massacre on June 19, 1971, when the group killed 70–106 Moro civilians (women, children and elders) inside a mosque.

Mohagher Iqbal even once claimed that the Ilaga was responsible for the deaths of Tens of thousands of Moro Muslims

== Background ==
The Mindanao region is rich in natural resources, including large quantities of mineral reserves. The American colonial government and subsequently the Philippine government pursued a policy of migration by resettling significant numbers of Christian Filipino settlers from the Visayas and Luzon onto tracts of land in Mindanao, beginning in the 1920s. This policy allowed Christian Filipinos to outnumber both the Moro and Lumad populations by the 1970s, which was a contributing factor in aggravating grievances between the indigenous Moro and Filipino Christian settlers as disputes over land increased. Another grievance by the Moro people is the extraction of Mindanao's natural resources by the central government whilst many Moros continued to live in poverty.

The Ilaga originated as an anti-ranchero resistance collective in Upi led by Commander Toothpick (Feliciano Luces), formed by Hiligaynon-speakers and Teduray natives specifically to defend against "a political clan of known Marcos cronies". The group gained legendary status and its members hailed as folk heroes after having prevailed over the security personnel of said "oppressive landed family" during an armed encounter, using nothing but mêlée weapons and homemade firearms. State security forces would eventually encourage Hiligaynon-speaking settlers from Iloilo and Panay Island who had emigrated to Mindanao to grow the militia, but hereafter coopted for a completely different purpose. There is anecdotal evidence that the Ilaga often committed human rights abuses by targeting the Moro and Lumad peoples, as well as attempting to seize additional territory. The end result of Ilaga extremism is the lingering animosity between Moro and Christian communities. Mistrust and a cycle of violence are still felt today due to the creation of the Ilaga.

== History ==
From December 1969 to February 1972, the Ilaga committed massacres resulting in the deaths of thousands Muslim civilians (mostly women, children and elders). The group is guilty of "mutilating bodies of victims" and "marking bodies with a Christian cross." The group also burned down and looted many houses and properties.

The Ilaga-Barracuda hostilities claimed the lives of 800 by the end of 1971.

From January 1 to July 1, 1971; The Ilaga killed 358 Muslim civilians

Due to sectarian conflict:, by the end of 1971, The number of refugees in Mindanao was estimated to be over 100,000

=== Manili massacre ===
Violence attributed to the Ilaga reached its climax on June 19, 1971 with the Manili massacre of 70–106 Moro Maguindanaon civilians (women, children and elders) in a mosque in Manili, Carmen, Cotabato. The Muslim residents of the town had gathered in their mosque to participate in a supposed peace talk with Christian groups when a group of armed men dressed in uniforms similar to those worn by members of the Philippine Constabulary opened fire on them.

=== Expulsion of the Ampatuans ===
During mid-1971, The Ampatuan political dynasty who ruled North-east Cotabato severely taxed Christian settlers and civilians, and abused them, Christian militias would eventually retaliate and expell the Ampatuans out of their areas causing significant casualties.

=== 1971 Battle of Lanao del Norte ===
Following the massacre at Manili, many Maranao Muslims civilians fled to take shelter in the Lanao del Norte. Some Muslims formed small militant groups to counter the Ilaga. One such group was called the "Barracudas" and in September 1971, the Barracudas clashed with the Ilagas resulting in the deaths of hundreds of people on both sides of the conflict. The Ilagas also clashed with the Philippine Constabulary. The skirmishes continued until October, and over 60 Muslim houses were torched by the Ilaga.

=== Murder of Tullio Favali ===
Tullio Favali was a member of the Pontifical Institute for Foreign Missions (PIME), an all-male international group of priests who are dedicated to evangelization in underdeveloped and non-Christian nations. Favali was assigned to do missions work in the Philippines, particularly in provinces in Mindanao. He arrived in the Philippines in 1983, and was ordained as the parish priest of La Esperanza in Tulunan, North Cotabato.

On April 11, 1985, Favali was called by townspeople for help after the Manero brothers shot the town's tailor. When the Manero brothers saw him arrive and enter a house, Norberto Jr. dragged his motorcycle and set it on fire. When Favali hurried out after seeing the fire, Edilberto threatened the priest before shooting him pointblank in the head, he then trampled on the fallen priest's body and fired again. This caused the priest's skull to crack open, and Norberto Jr. picked the brains and displayed them to the horrified witnesses. The brothers, along with a few other gang members, stood by laughing and heckling.

The Manero brothers and five others were found guilty of murder, and sentenced to life imprisonment. The court also found Norberto Jr. guilty of arson.

Noeberto Manero, Jr., however, would later be pardoned.

=== 1996 attack and burning of Bual ===
On December 16, 1996, the Ilaga group attacked and burned a mosque and around 200 Muslim homes in Bual, Isulan, Sultan Kudarat. A barangay that is composed of a majority Maguindanaon Muslims origin population (60%), with significant minorities of Christian Ilonggo and Ilocano (38%), and also Lumad (2%). There were no reported casualties, but thousands of villagers were displaced. The attackers doused Muslim homes with gasoline and set them on fire. This incident is the second in the past month. In late November, the group also burned down around 90 homes in another Muslim area.

The arson and attack were closely related to the death of a Christian farmer the day before the attack. The farmer was killed by Muslim residents in retaliation for the deaths of two Muslim children, after their house was shot at by people suspected of being from a radical Christian group. The Moro Islamic Liberation Front (MILF) fighter group threatened to retaliate against the arson through its spokesman Mohagher Iqbal.

=== 1999 Lanao Del Norte Attack ===
On June 14, 1999, A 5 day gunbattle between 200 Ilaga members and suspected MILF fighters in Lanao Del Norte resulted in the deaths of at least 43 people

=== Post-2008 resurgence ===
Increased tensions in the Philippines since 2008 have since seen the re-emergence of the armed vigilante group calling themselves the Bag-ong Ilaga (Visayan: New Ilaga). Since 2008, violence flared up with the Moro Islamic Liberation Front and the Armed Forces of the Philippines after the Supreme Court of the Philippines overruled the proposed treaty for an Autonomous Region in Muslim Mindanao.

In August 2008, the Ilaga killed 30 MILF insurgents in North Cotabato

In November 2008, the Ilaga killed five unarmed Muslim civilians in an ambush in Lanao del Norte.

In 2012, two members of the group committed robbery and also murdered two civilians in Leyte, they were then arrested.

In 2014, the Ilaga engaged in a firefight with the BIFF to defend a local sitio in Cotabato, the firefight ensued until government forces arrived

In 2016, a splinter group of the Ilaga emerged, the Red God's Defenders.

== See also ==
- Right-wing terrorism
- Moro insurgency in the Philippines
- Bangsamoro
- Integrated Civilian Home Defense Forces
- Citizen Armed Force Geographical Unit
- Alsa Masa
- Rock Christ (paramilitary sect)
- Tadtad
