= Alsa Masa =

Philippine anti-communist paramilitary group

- Dates active: 1984–1985; 1986–1987
- Country: Philippines

The Alsa Masa was a rightwing vigilante group in the Philippines initially formed in early 1984 specifically to combat the New People's Army in Barangay Agdao, Davao City. It was then later revived and expanded in April 1986 with the support of the Philippine Constabulary's Davao Metro District Command. It was created at a time when the NPA was still experimenting with approaches like urban insurrectionism, creating an atmosphere of extreme violence in Mindanao. However, Alsa Masa itself was soon noted to also be a perpetrator of numerous human rights violations, creating a cycle of violence in the locality. Many of Alsa Masa's members were later recruited into the Civilian Armed Forces Geographical Units which the Philippine government created in July 1987.

== Background ==
By the early 1980s, there had been about a decade of conflict between the Martial Law regime of President Ferdinand Marcos and the New People's Army of the Marxist–Leninist-Maoist Communist Party of the Philippines (CPP).

The CPP was established during the time of Marcos' first term as president by remnants of an earlier Marxist–Leninist party which had effectively been defeated by prior Presidential administrations. Barred from running for a third term as president, Marcos managed to extend his hold in power beyond two constitutionally-allowed four year terms by putting the Philippines under martial law in September 1972, citing social unrest in the wake of the economic instability created by his own debt-driven government spending during his reelection campaign. Marcos played up the then still newly-formed Communist Party of the Philippines to help justify the declaration of Martial Law, but this had the effect of mythologizing the group and making it easier to recruit Filipinos fleeing the administration's political suppression, or angered by the regime's numerous human rights abuses.

Marcos had taken full control of the Armed Forces of the Philippines, abolished freedom of speech and the freedom of the press, as well as many other civil liberties. He dissolved the Philippine Congress and shut down media establishments critical of his Administration. This period in Philippine history is remembered for numerous human rights abuses, targeting political opponents, student activists, journalists, religious workers, farmers, and others who fought against Marcos - including 3,257 known extrajudicial killings, 35,000 documented tortures, 759 "disappeared", and 70,000 incarcerations documented by international human rights organizations.

During 1982, Marcos' forces gained several significant victories against the CPP in Mindanao, notably the death of prominent party thinker and ideologue Edgar Jopson in September. But from 1983 onwards, various major events led to many Mindanaoans being radicalized and joining the NPA's ranks.

The 1983 Philippine economic nosedive and the Assassination of Ninoy Aquino a few months later saw the New People's Army grow to seven fronts (Battalion sized units), In order to keep its large number of cadres supplied, the NPA depended heavily on local citizens for supplies, increasing the incidences of abusive behavior, and reducing support for their cause. This coincided with a decision to experiment with strategies like urban insurrectionism. Severe violence began with assassinations of corrupt officials and policemen, but mid-1984 and August 1985 also saw 16 journalists killed where only six had been killed in the decade between 1975 and 1984. Agdao, the urban poor barangay from which of the NPA got much of its support, began to be known as "Nicaragdao," in reference to the ongoing Nicaraguan civil war, while the foreign press began labelling Davao the Philippines "Murder Capital" and the "Killing Fields". The NPA's experiments with urban insurrectionism led all of Mindanao to be labeled "the laboratory of the revolution."

== Formation ==
In 1984, rightwing vigilantes headed by Marcos supporter and barangay chairman of Agdao, Wilfredo “Baby” Aquino formed the armed group "Alsa Masa" (lit. "People's Uprising") to counter them. This move made Baby Aquino a sort of “political overlord” in Agdao, with the Alsa Masa becoming “notorious for its own lawless activities, including liquidations of suspected rebels.” Aquino was assassinated in November 1985. The group's spokesperson was Jun Pala, who later denounced the movement for its failure to solve the underlying causes of the insurgency and for allegedly recruiting "hoodlums, snatchers, holdup men” and other people with criminal records" with the approval of the military. He was assassinated in 2003.

== Reconstitution ==
The Alsa Masa was then reconstituted in 1986 with the support of Philippine Constabulary Davao City Metropolitan Command commander Lt. Colonel Franco Calida.

The Alsa Masa's efforts, coinciding with infighting within the NPA itself, caused the NPA in Mindanao to launch a hunt for deep penetration agents among their ranks and had the effect of reducing NPA presence in Davao. Meanwhile, Alsa Masa itself was documented to be committing human rights violations.

== Local responses in Davao ==
Most Davao residents remained staunchly against violence from either extreme. However, these peaceful citizens lacked the political clout to influence the situation. One stabilizing element during the mid-1980s was the designation of then-Colonel Rodolfo Biazon as commander of the 3rd Marine Brigade assigned to Davao. In what the international press dubbed "the most sophisticated approach" to addressing the insurgency, Biazon eschewed the aggressive stance preferred by the Philippine Constabulary and instead focused on outreach and community engagement, particularly visiting schools and communities, and assuring the public that erring Marines would be disciplined for any abuses.

== People Power revolution ==
In February 1986, the Marcos regime was overthrown by the civilian-led People Power revolution, to which the people of Davao, organized into groups such as the Yellow Friday Movement of Soledad Duterte, contributed. Marcos' opponent Corazon Aquino replaced Marcos as president, and Duterte's son Rodrigo became Mayor of Davao. There were initially hopes that Aquino would be able to forge a peace with the CPP, but rightwing elements in Aquino's government managed to create an atmosphere of distrust significant enough to create a permanent rift between Aquino and the Philippine left.

== After 1987 ==
In July 1987, the Aquino government created a concept called the Civilian Armed Forces Geographical Unit (CAFGU), an irregular auxiliary force of the Armed Forces of the Philippines focusing on anti-insurgency efforts in the countryside. Many of Alsa Masa's members were later recruited into the CAFGU.

== See also ==
- Integrated Civilian Home Defense Forces
- Citizen Armed Force Geographical Unit
- Ilaga
- Rock Christ (paramilitary sect)
- Tadtad
