= Integrated Civilian Home Defense Forces =

Paramilitary force in the Philippines

The Integrated Civilian Home Defense Forces, also called the Civilian Home Defense Force and commonly referred to by its acronym CHDF, was an irregular paramilitary force supervised and deployed by the heads of the local government in the Philippines — provincial governors, city and municipal mayors. The CHDF was active during the 1970s, and was officially disbanded in 1986 after the People Power Revolution. However, the creation of the Citizen Armed Force Geographical Unit in 1987 provided the opportunity for CHDF members to once again perform their former duties.

== Creation ==
The Philippine Constabulary recruited, organized and equipped official civilian militia during the Hukbalahap Rebellion after World War II. After the Hukbalahap were effectively suppressed in 1956, these militia units were organized into "Barrio Self-Defense Units".

In 1972, Ferdinand E. Marcos declared martial law in the Philippines. One of the terms of the 1973 martial law-era Philippine Constitution was the establishment of the "Self-Defense Forces" to help combat the Islamic insurgency in Mindanao and later the Communist insurgency.

In 1977, Marcos issued Presidential Decree No. 1016, formally establishing the Integrated Civilian Home Defense Forces for the purpose of maintenance of peace and order. At its inception, the CHDF numbered 73,000 men, and became a notorious human rights violator.

In July 1987, Corazon Aquino issued Executive Order 275, dissolving the CHDF and other paramilitary units. However, that same month she issued Executive Order 264, establishing the Citizen Armed Force Geographical Unit on the advice of then-Defense Secretary Fidel V. Ramos. Former members, between 25%-70%, of the disbanded CHDF were then integrated into the CAFGU.

== Organization ==
Over-all organization, training and equipment was provided by the Department of National Defense, while screening and appointment of actual members was carried out by the military provincial commander upon the recommendation of the local government heads and the Chief of the Philippine Constabulary. Deployment and utilization of the CHDF troops fell under the supervision of the provincial governor, city and municipal mayors, who coordinated with military and Integrated National Police units in areas under the jurisdiction of the local government. In practice, the CHDF were under the control of the city and municipal mayors.

Various paramilitary groups with their own names and identities, including a number which portrayed themselves as religious or quasi-religious organizations, were recruited into the CHDF, with some being designated as special units of Marcos' Armed Forces.

Among the better known of these groups were:

- Alsa Masa - a vigilante armed group initially formed in early 1984 specifically to combat the New People's Army in Barangay Agdao, Davao City, and later revived and expanded in April 1986 with the support of the Philippine Constabulary's Davao Metro District Command;
- the Ilaga - a Christian extremist paramilitary group active throughout the island of Mindanao which embraced a form of Folk Catholicism which highlighted violent acts and the use of amulets;
- the Rock Christ sect - a paramilitary sect well known for their human rights violations, particularly the massacre of a Subanen family in Tudela, Misamis Occidental; and
- the Tadtad, whose formal name was Sagrado Corazon Señor (SCS) - a paramilitary religious sect established in 1972 in Initao, Misamis Oriental by Sagrado Sade Jr. and whose main handler in the 1980s was current Philippine senator Bato dela Rosa.

== In media ==
The antagonists in Lav Diaz' 2018 film Season of the Devil are specifically identified as members of the martial law era Civilian Home Defense Forces, and are responsible for various atrocities in the Barrio of Ginto.

The conflict between the CHDF and rebels in the town of Glan, Sarangani is depicted in Bryan Wong's 2019 action film Bahad.

== See also ==
- Citizen Armed Force Geographical Unit
- Alsa Masa
- Ilaga
- Rock Christ (paramilitary sect)
- Tadtad
