= Tulunan =

Municipality in Cotabato, Philippines

- Municipality
- Municipality of Tulunan
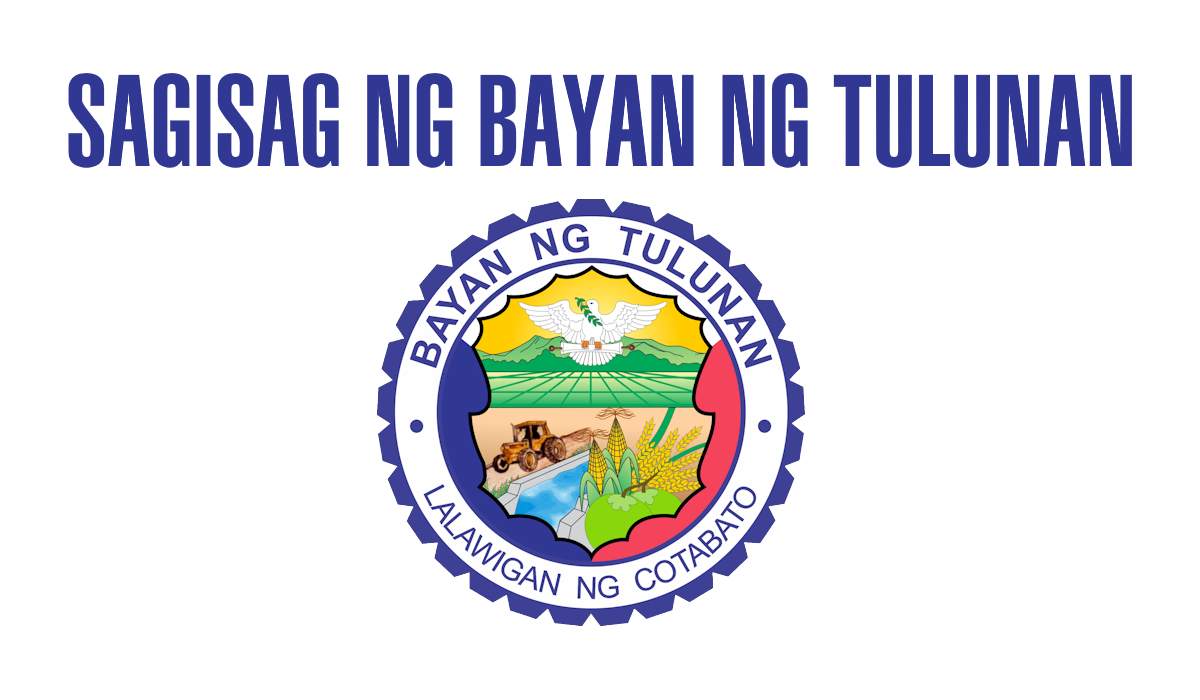
- Flag Seal
- Etymology: Tulun (place of abundance)
- Anthem: Tulunan Hymn
- Map of Cotabato with Tulunan highlighted
- Interactive map of Tulunan
- Location within the Philippines
- Coordinates: 6°49′53″N 124°52′29″E
- Country: Philippines
- Region: Soccsksargen
- Province: Cotabato
- District: 3rd district
- Founded: August 6, 1961
- Barangays: 29 (see Barangays)

Government
  - Type: Sangguniang Bayan
  - Mayor: Lee Roy V. Villasor
  - Vice Mayor: Rhezan P. Obrique
  - Representative: Ma. Alana Samantha T. Santos
  - Electorate: 42,124 voters (2025)

Area
  - Total: 343.08 km^{2} (132.46 sq mi)
- Elevation: 22 m (72 ft)
- Highest elevation: 46 m (151 ft)
- Lowest elevation: 10 m (33 ft)

Population (2024 census)
  - Total: 61,901
  - Density: 180.43/km^{2} (467.30/sq mi)
  - Households: 14,984

Economy
  - Income class: 1st municipal income class
  - Poverty incidence: 22.52% (2023)
  - Revenue: ₱ 274.9 million (2024)
  - Assets: ₱ 768 million (2024)
  - Expenditure: ₱ 139.1 million (2024)
  - Liabilities: ₱ 250 million (2024)

Service provider
  - Electricity: Cotabato Electric Cooperative (COTELCO)
- Time zone: UTC+8 (PST)
- ZIP code: 9403
- PSGC: 1204714000
- IDD : area code: +63 (0)64
- Native languages: Hiligaynon; Cebuano; Maguindanao; Ilianen; Tagalog
- Website: www.tulunan-cotabatoprov.gov.ph

Tulunan, officially the Municipality of Tulunan (Cebuano: Lungsod sa Tulunan; Hiligaynon: Banwa sang Tulunan; Maguindanaon: Inged nu Tulunan, Jawi: ايڠايد نو تولونن; Tagalog: Bayan ng Tulunan), is a municipality in the province of Cotabato, Philippines. According to the 2024 census, it has a population of 61,901 people.

== Etymology ==
The name Tulunan derived from the Maguindanaon word tulun, which means 'a place of abundance' or 'where grace falls'.

== History ==
=== Before establishment ===
Originally, the area was inhabited by Muslim tribes in the lowlands, while nomadic groups like the Blaans and Bagobos resided in the hills and mountains. The governance system followed datuism, with Datu Enok considered the first ruling datu 'local leader'.

During Datu Enok's reign, the community flourished, benefiting from plentiful harvests from their kaingin. This prosperity led to the adoption of the name "Tulunan", reflecting the abundance and grace bestowed upon the area, as indicated by the Muslim term tulun.

The population originally consisted of small nomadic groups reliant on hunting, but contact with other groups led to improvements in their way of life. With the introduction of Islam by Sharif Kabungsuwan in the 14th century, the influence of religion reached Tulunan through settlers who identified as Maguindanaon. However, minority groups such as Bagobos and Blaans occupied the eastern highlands.

Sultan Solaiman was a prominent Muslim leader, succeeded by Datu Mangko Ambag and his advisors like Dappil Tuden, Kasan Kandugon, and Datu Parangan, who settled in the lowlands near rivers, engaging in kaingins and fishing.

Datu Dempon emerged as a notable leader of the Blaans, leading to clashes with the Maguindanaons that disrupted peace and order. However, peace was restored through the marriage of Datu Mangko to a Blaan woman, leading to the subjugation of the Blaans under Datu Mangko's leadership, strengthening the Muslim group.

In early 1956, a group of leaders led by Datu Udtog Matalam petitioned for Tulunan's separation from its mother municipality, M'lang, but faced opposition. Another effort led by the "Big Five" group, composed of Datu Dabpil Tuden, Arsenio Villamor Sr., Juan Jinen, Mauro Quibrantar, and Jose Ordenia, succeeded in achieving independence for Tulunan.

=== Establishment ===
In 1947, after World War II, the municipal district of Kidapawan was converted into a municipality, with merging of then forested M'lang-Tulunan area. This was due to the closeness of the Manobos with the Maguindanaons, along with the increase of Ilonggo settlers with relatives in the municipal districts into a then-mostly Maguindanaon territory. M'lang was established as a separate municipality from Kidapawan in 1951.

Tulunan was created by virtue of Executive Order No. 441, signed on August 6, 1961, by President Carlos P. Garcia, upon the separation of 28 barrios and sitios of M'lang in the then-undivided Cotabato; with the seat of government at barrio Tulunan. With the establishment of M'lang and Tulunan, Kidapawan's direct access to the Ligawasan Marsh was cut off.

Datu Ibrahim Paglas Jr. serves as the provisional mayor, with Datu Catong Madidis as Vice Mayor. Datu Mangko Ambag, Roberto Jover Sr., Benito Cabello, and Datu Diadel Kamag were appointed as its first councilors.

In the 1963 election, Godofredo Laluyan became the first elected Mayor of Tulunan, with Arsenio Villamor Sr. serving as Vice Mayor. Conrado Lemana won the 1967 election and served as mayor until 1980. He was succeeded by Josue Faustino, who implemented various government programs with diligence and wisdom.

=== During Marcos presidency ===
In early 1983, the municipality was one of eleven in the province, and other provinces in central Mindanao, where most families suffered food shortage due to the long drought.

On April 11, 1985, Italian Roman Catholic priest Tullio Favali of the Pontifical Institute for Foreign Missions, the town's parish priest, was killed by the Ilaga armed paramilitary group led by Norberto Manero Jr. in Barangay La Esperanza. The case was among a few under the Marcos presidency that successfully prosecuted; in 1987, Manero, convicted of murder and arson, was sentenced to reclusión perpetua since death penalty had been suspended earlier. Manero later became controversial for his freedom from jail, both by presidential pardon and by escape, and was eventually released in 2008.

=== Recent years ===
Galidan was the only barangay in the municipality to request inclusion in the Bangsamoro, established under Republic Act No. 11054 after replacing the Autonomous Region in Muslim Mindanao. Nonetheless, it was one of four barangays in the province that opted out during the February 6, 2019 plebiscite.

In October 2019, Tulunan was the epicenter of some of the 2019 Cotabato earthquakes, most notably the magnitude 6.6 quake on October 29, which resulted in at least 22 deaths, over 400 injuries, and affected about 200,000 residents across Cotabato and nearby areas.

== Geography ==
Tulunan is located in southern Cotabato Province, 31 kilometers (19 mi) from Kidapawan City, the provincial capital. It is bordered by M'lang to the north, Datu Paglas, Maguindanao del Sur to the south, Liguasan Marsh to the west, Makilala to the northeast, Magsaysay, Davao del Sur to the east, and Columbio, Sultan Kudarat to the southeast.

=== Barangays ===
Tulunan is politically subdivided into 29 barangays. Each barangay consists of puroks while some have sitios.

- Bacong
- Bagumbayan
- Banayal
- Batang
- Bituan
- Bual
- Bunawan
- Daig
- Damawato
- Dungos
- F. Cajelo
- Galidan
- Genoveva Baynosa
- Kanibong
- La Esperanza
- Lampagang
- Magbok
- Maybula
- Minapan
- Nabundasan
- New Caridad
- New Culasi
- New Panay
- Paraiso
- Poblacion
- Popoyon
- Sibsib
- Tambac
- Tuburan

=== Climate ===
Climate data for Tulunan, Cotabato
Month	Jan	Feb	Mar	Apr	May	Jun	Jul	Aug	Sep	Oct	Nov	Dec	Year
Mean daily maximum °C (°F)	32 (90)	32 (90)	33 (91)	33 (91)	32 (90)	31 (88)	30 (86)	31 (88)	31 (88)	31 (88)	31 (88)	31 (88)	32 (89)
Mean daily minimum °C (°F)	21 (70)	21 (70)	21 (70)	22 (72)	23 (73)	23 (73)	23 (73)	23 (73)	23 (73)	23 (73)	23 (73)	22 (72)	22 (72)
Average precipitation mm (inches)	19 (0.7)	14 (0.6)	15 (0.6)	18 (0.7)	33 (1.3)	42 (1.7)	44 (1.7)	42 (1.7)	30 (1.2)	31 (1.2)	28 (1.1)	17 (0.7)	333 (13.2)
Average rainy days	6.9	5.6	6.9	8.1	15.1	17.5	17.8	18.5	14.9	14.9	12.4	8.0	146.6
Source: Meteoblue

Tulunan experiences a climate characterized by relatively even distribution throughout the year and rainfall ranging from 60 mm to 215 mm, with an average annual rainfall of 115.04 mm. The dry season typically occurs in January, February, March, and December, while the remaining months see occasional rains. January and December are generally the coldest months, with an average temperature of 28.25 degrees Celsius. Prevailing winds come during the wet/rainy season. Despite being outside the typhoon belt and protected by small mountains, Tulunan may still experience heavy rains, leading to the overflowing of rivers like Malasila, Tulunan, and Bual. These occurrences, particularly in August and September, result in severe flooding hazards in barangays Damawato, Bual, Popoyon, Tambac, Bagumbayan, Minapan, and Dungos, affecting approximately 1,200 hectares or 3.43% of the total area. Such climatic conditions adversely affect agricultural productivity in these barangays, as floods can unexpectedly destroy crops, often resulting in losses ranging from 50% to 100%.

== Demographics ==
Population census of Tulunan
Year	Pop.	±% p.a.
1970	24,538	—
1975	12,367	−12.84%
1980	19,941	+10.02%
1990	31,412	+4.65%
1995	34,584	+1.82%
2000	41,756	+4.12%
2007	47,159	+1.69%
2010	54,884	+5.68%
2015	56,513	+0.56%
2020	60,978	+1.61%
2024	61,901	+0.36%
Source: Philippine Statistics Authority

In the 2024 census, Tulunan's population was 61,901, with a density of 180.43/km² or 467.3/mi².

== Economy ==
Poverty incidence of Tulunan (%)

Source: Philippine Statistics Authority

Agricultural products like rice and corn, upland rice, legumes, green onions, root crops, tobacco, rubber, vegetables, sorghum and coconuts.

== Government ==
Municipal leaders of Tulunan
Year in office	Mayor	Vice mayor	Notes
1961–1964	Datu Ibrahim Paglas	Datu Catong Madidis	
1964–1967	Godofredo Laluyan	Arsenio Villamor Sr.	
1967–1972	Condrado Lemana	Alfredo Tadiaque Sr.	
1972–1980	Condrado Lemana	Reynaldo Yata Sr.	
1980–1986	Josue Faustino (First time)	Reynaldo Yata Sr.	
1986–1988	Juan Perez Sr.	Pedro Amigable	Officers in Charge
1988–1992	Josue Faustino (Second time)	Hermilio Pancho	
1992–1995	Engr. Rodolfo Peñafiel (First time)	Armando Casalan	
1995–1998	Engr. Rodolfo Peñafiel (First time)	Ernesto Pedregosa	
1998–2001	Armando Casalan	Nestor Almirante	
2001–2004	Engr. Rodolfo Peñafiel (Second time)	Ernesto Porras Jr.	
2004–2007	Nestor Ta-asan	Joemar Cerebo	
2007–2013	Lani Candolada	Joemar Cerebo	
2013–2016	Lani Candolada	Joel Villamor	
2016–2019	Reuel Limbungan	Lani Candolada	
2019–2022	Reuel Limbungan	Maureene Ann Villamor	
2022–2025	Reuel Limbungan	Abraham Contayoso	
2025–present	Lee Roy Villasor	Rhezan Obrique	

== Notable personalities ==
- Mary Jean Lastimosa - actress, model, and Miss Universe Philippines 2014, reaching the Top 10 in Miss Universe 2014.
