= Citizen Armed Force Geographical Unit =

Force of the Armed Forces of the Philippines

The Citizen Armed Force Geographical Unit, variously called Citizens Armed Forces Geographical Unit, Civilian Armed Forces Geographical Unit and commonly referred to by its acronym CAFGU (pronounced "kahf-goo") is an irregular auxiliary force of the Armed Forces of the Philippines focusing on anti-insurgency efforts in the countryside. As of 2022, an estimated 69,938 CAFGU troopers are active in the country, taking part in military operations alongside regular soldiers of the AFP.

== History ==
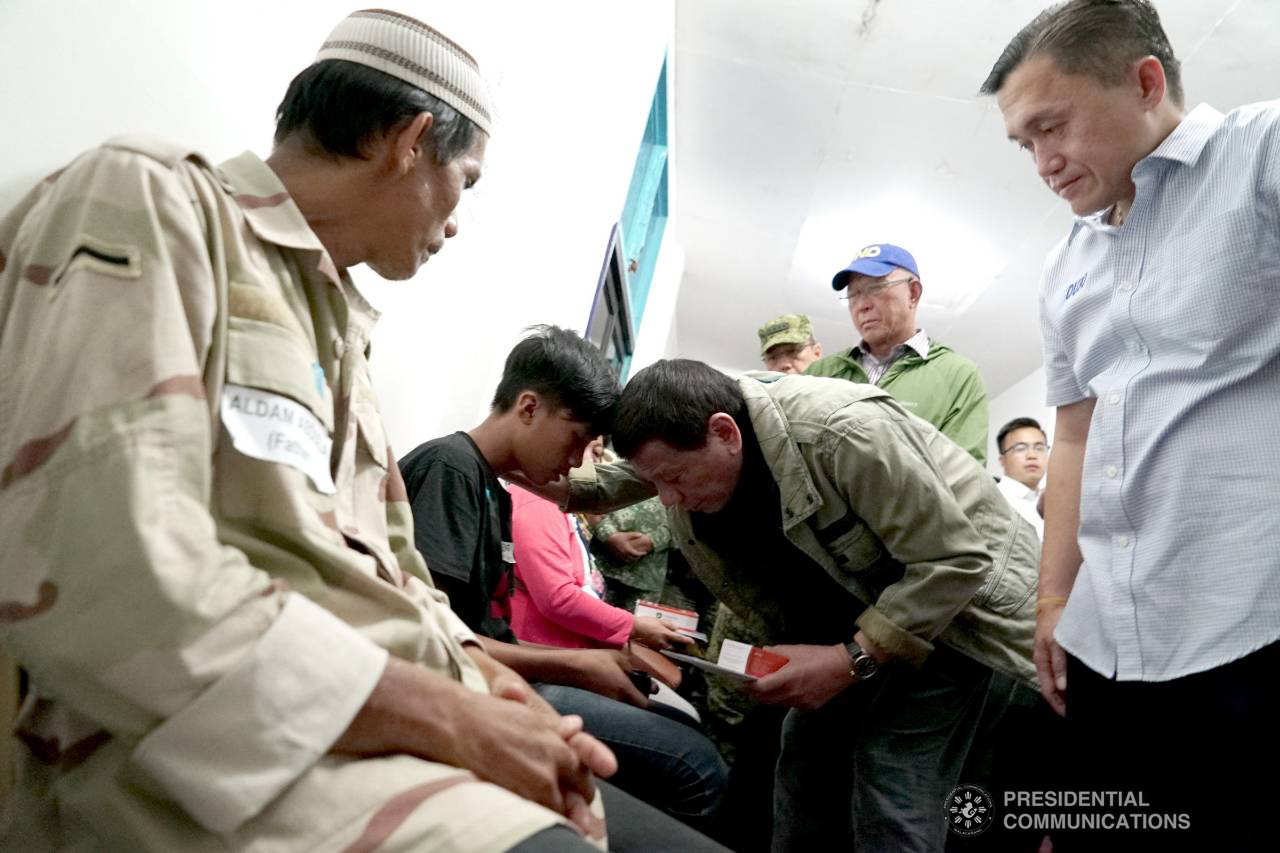
President Rodrigo Duterte (center) checks a wounded CAFGU Active Auxiliary during his visit to Camp Navarro General Hospital in Zamboanga City on August 4, 2018.

The CAFGU was created on July 25, 1987, when President Corazon C. Aquino signed Executive Order No. 264 entitled "Providing for the Citizen Armed Force". The creation of the unit was based on the "clear, consolidate, hold and develop" strategy adopted by then-Defense Secretary Fidel V. Ramos in dealing with insurgent-infiltrated villages.

CAFGU units are components of the AFP Ready Reserve detailed to Military Auxiliary Service. Article X, Sec. 61, sub-paragraph 2 of Republic Act 7077 describes this manner of service as follows:

Military auxiliary service entails services rendered in meeting local insurgency threat. Reservists serving under this category will be organized into Ready Reserve units. They must be issued and allowed to carry firearms: Provided, That these reservists will be utilized only for the defense of their respective localities and will not be employed outside their localities. Elected/appointed local government officials are expected to perform their duties and responsibilities in their respective peace and order council levels or similar organizations efficiently and effectively to enhance a total integrated system approach against threats to national security. The Secretary of National Defense shall prescribe the rules and regulations to implement this section in coordination with the Secretary of the Interior and Local Government.

In 2020, President Rodrigo Duterte established a comprehensive social benefits program for CAFGU members, alongside the military and the police, who are killed in the performance of their duties.

=== Human Rights abuse record ===
In 1993, the Philippine government considered deactivating the CAFGU units due to allegations of human rights abuses; 60 CAFGU units comprising 10,000 troops were disbanded. However, in 1996, the government halted its program to completely disband the CAFGU units. The Commission on Human Rights' records show that as of 2000, 853 human rights abuse cases have been filed against 1,070 CAFGU members.

== Organization ==
CAFGU units are administered by, and under the operational control of, regular units of the Armed Forces of the Philippines. Philippine Army infantry battalions assigned to this function are also referred to as "Cadre Battalions". Deactivation of CAFGU units assigned to these battalions result in the return of their status as regular infantry battalions.

The CAFGU units are tasked to prevent the re-infiltration of insurgents into communities that have already been cleared of their influence by combat operations conducted by regular units of the Armed Forces of the Philippines.

The CAFGU units are issued small arms; typically U.S. sourced M-14, or M-16 type rifles, and receive a monthly stipend of Php 4,500.00 (about US$92.43).

== See also ==
- Integrated Civilian Home Defense Forces
- Civilian Irregular Defense Group
