= Martial law in the Philippines =

Military rule imposed in the Philippines during several periods

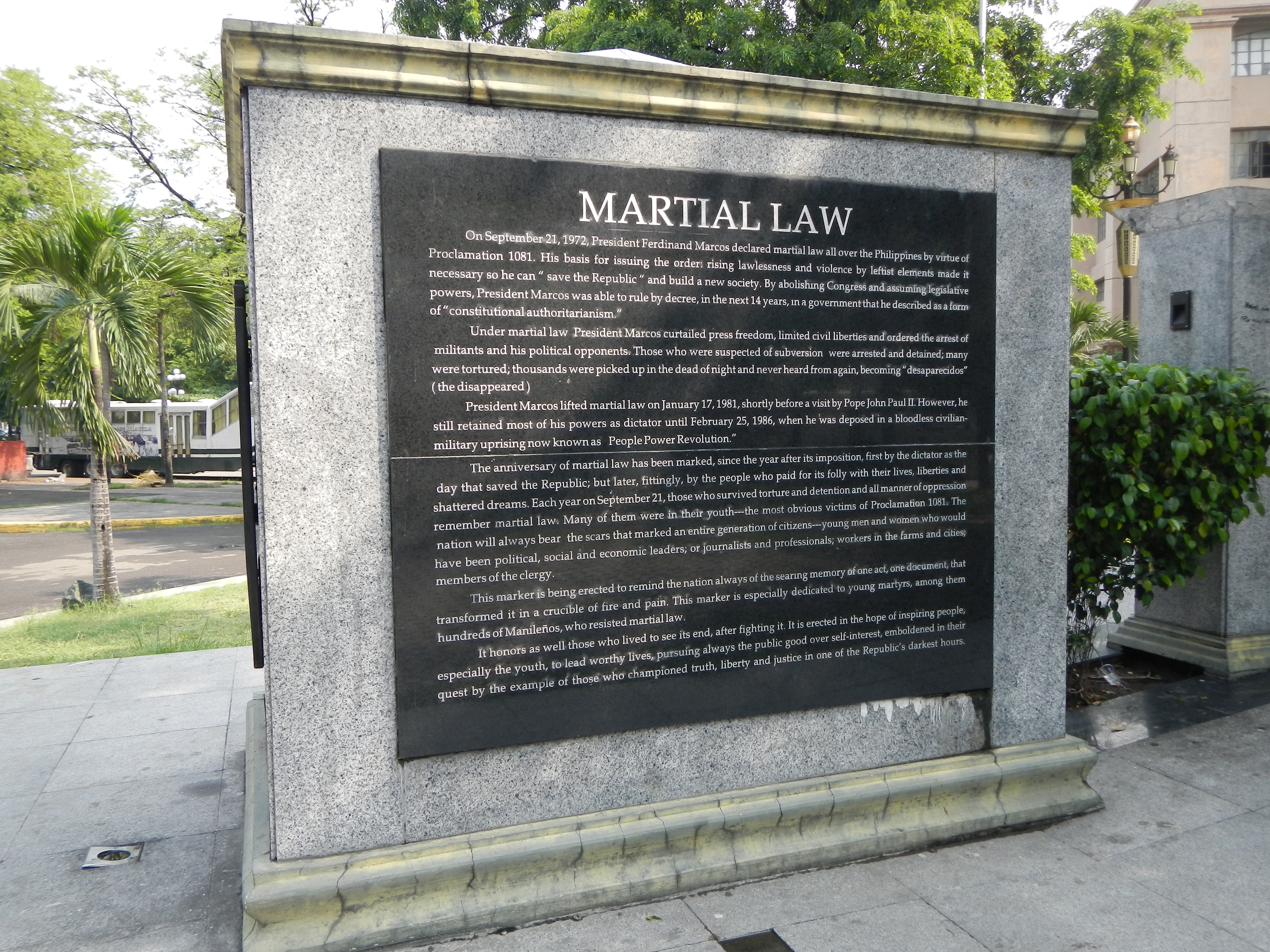
Martial law monument in Mehan Garden

Martial law in the Philippines (Filipino: Batas militar sa Pilipinas) has been declared during several periods in Philippine history, most prominently during the administration of Ferdinand Marcos, but also during the country's Spanish and American colonial periods, during the Second World War, and more recently on the island of Mindanao during the administrations of Gloria Macapagal Arroyo and Rodrigo Duterte. The alternative term "martial law era" as applied to the Philippines is typically used to describe the martial law under Ferdinand Marcos specifically.

Martial law has historically been implemented through the Armed Forces of the Philippines (AFP) and its predecessor bodies, serving as the head of state's primary tool for implementing political power in a reversal of the normal practice of civil control of the military.

Under the current Constitution of the Philippines, the president, as head of state and commander in chief of the armed forces, may declare martial law "in case of invasion or rebellion, when the public safety requires it." Most countries use a different legal construct, such as "state of emergency."

Typically, its imposition accompanies curfews, the suspension of civil law, civil rights, habeas corpus, and the application or extension of military law or military justice to civilians. Civilians defying martial law may be subjected to military tribunals (court-martial).

== Summary ==
Enacted by	Date commenced	Date lifted	Territorial extent	Legal basis
Governor General Ramon Blanco	August 30, 1896	December 10, 1898	Provinces of Manila, Bulacan, Cavite, Pampanga, Tarlac, Laguna, Batangas, and Nueva Ecija	Official proclamation stating that The civilian government and civilian judicial authorities shall continue functioning in all matters appropriately belonging to their attributes that do not refer to public order and this last matter to whatever the military allows them to do or delegates to them, requiring each one to give the other any news that will reach their knowledge
President Emilio Aguinaldo	May 24, 1898	June 23, 1898	nationwide	Revolutionary decree instituting a dictatorial government under a dictatorial leadership I am compelled to establish a Dictatorial Government with full authority, civil and military, to determine first the real needs of the country
President Jose P. Laurel	September 23, 1944	August 17, 1945	nationwide	Proclamation No. 29 The danger of invasion being imminent and the public safety so requiring, I, Jose P. Laurel, President of the Republic of the Philippines, pursuant to the authority conferred upon me by section 9, article II, of the Constitution, do hereby place the Philippines and all parts thereof under martial law and suspend the privileges of the writ of habeas corpus therein.
President Ferdinand E. Marcos	September 23, 1972	January 17, 1981	nationwide	Proclamation No. 1081 Proclaiming the State of Martial law in the Philippines
President Gloria Macapagal Arroyo	December 5, 2009	December 13, 2009	Province of Maguindanao	Proclamation No. 1959 Proclaiming a State of Martial law and suspending the Writ of Habeas Corpus in the Province of Maguindanao, except for certain areas
President Rodrigo Duterte	May 23, 2017	December 31, 2019	Entire Mindanao	Proclamation No. 216 Declaring a State of Martial law and suspending the Writ of Habeas Corpus in the Whole of Mindanao

== Under Spanish colonial rule ==
In April 1871, Governor-General Rafael de Izquierdo declared martial law in the provinces of Cavite and Pampanga as a measure against banditry.

Following the outbreak of the Philippine Revolution in August 1896, Governor-General Ramon Blanco declared on August 30 the imposition of martial law in eight provinces: Manila, Bulacan, Cavite, Pampanga, Tarlac, Laguna, Batangas, and Nueva Ecija. These eight provinces, the first provinces to join the revolution, would later be represented in the eight rays of the sun in the Philippine flag. Despite such declaration, which provided a 48-hour period in giving amnesty to rebels except their leaders, Blanco adopted a cool, conciliatory stance, seeking to improve Spain's image in the face of world opinion.

== Under the Aguinaldo administration ==
After the outbreak of the Spanish–American War, the exiled leader of the revolution, Emilio Aguinaldo, returned to the Philippines from Hong Kong with American support on May 19, 1898, to resume the revolution. On May 23, Aguinaldo issued a proclamation in which he assumed command of all Filipino military forces and established a dictatorial government with himself styled as "Dictator" instead of "President" as in his previous "Republic of the Philippines".

On June 12, at Aguinaldo's ancestral home in Cavite, Philippine independence was proclaimed and the Act of the Declaration of Independence of the Filipino People, which refers to him as "Dictator", was read. On June 18, issued a decree formally establishing his dictatorial government. On June 23 another decree signed by Aguinaldo was issued, replacing the Dictatorial Government with a Revolutionary Government, with himself styled as "President" again. Eventually this government would be replaced in turn by the proper First Philippine Republic in 1899.

== Under American colonial rule ==
Military governor Gen. Arthur MacArthur Jr. placed the country under martial law on December 20, 1900.

Martial law was proclaimed in Leyte in January 1907.

== Under Japanese military administration ==
On January 2, 1942, after Manila was captured, the commander-in-chief of the Imperial Forces Lt. Gen. Masaharu Homma proclaimed martial law in all occupied areas.

== Under the Laurel administration ==
President José P. Laurel of the wartime Second Philippine Republic placed the Philippines under martial law in 1944 through Proclamation No. 29, dated September 21. Martial law came into effect on September 22, 1944. Proclamation No. 30 was issued the next day, declaring the existence of a state of war between the Philippines, the US and Great Britain. This took effect on September 23, 1944.

== Under the Osmeña administration ==
According to the 1986 edition of RR Philippine Almanac: Book of Facts, there was martial law in Nueva Ecija on January 7, 1946.

== Under the Marcos administration ==
At 7:17 pm on September 23, 1972, President Ferdinand Marcos announced that he had placed the entirety of the Philippines under martial law, through Presidential Proclamation No. 1081, which was dated September 21, 1972. This marked the beginning of a 14-year period of one man rule which would effectively last until Marcos was exiled from the country on February 25, 1986. Even though the formal proclamation was lifted on January 17, 1981, Marcos retained virtually all of his powers as dictator until he was ousted by the EDSA Revolution.

When he declared martial law in 1972, Marcos claimed that he had done so in response to the "communist threat" posed by the newly founded Communist Party of the Philippines (CPP), and the sectarian "rebellion" of the Mindanao Independence Movement (MIM). Opposition figures of the time, such as Lorenzo Tañada, José W. Diokno, and Jovito R. Salonga, accused Marcos of exaggerating these threats, using them as a convenient excuse to consolidate power and extend his reign beyond the two presidential terms allowed by the 1935 constitution.

After Marcos was ousted, government investigators discovered that the declaration of martial law had also allowed the Marcoses to hide secret stashes of unexplained wealth which various courts later determined to be "of criminal origin."

This 14-year period in Philippine history is remembered for the administration's record of human rights abuses, particularly targeting political opponents, student activists, journalists, religious workers, farmers, and others who fought against the Marcos dictatorship. Based on the documentation of Amnesty International, Task Force Detainees of the Philippines, and similar human rights monitoring entities, historians believe that the Marcos dictatorship was marked by 3,257 known extrajudicial killings, 35,000 documented tortures, 737 'disappeared', and 70,000 incarcerations.

=== Background ===
==== Economic roots and social unrest ====
Through a very bad combination of loan-funded deficit spending and large-scale infrastructure projects, the administration of Ferdinand Marcos became very popular during his first term as president—enough so that Marcos ran for reelection in 1969 and succeeded in becoming the first president of the Third Philippine Republic to be re-elected. To assure this win, Marcos launched US$50 million worth in infrastructure projects in 1969 to create an impression of progress for the electorate.

However, this ramp-up on loan-funded government spending led the Marcos administration to its first major economic crisis The campaign spending spree was so massive that it caused a balance of payments crisis, so the government was compelled to seek a debt rescheduling plan with the International Monetary Fund. The IMF mandated stabilization plan which accompanied the agreement included numerous macroeconomic interventions, including a shift away from the Philippines' historical economic strategy of import substitution industrialization and towards export-oriented industrialization; and the allowing the Philippine Peso to float and devalue. The inflationary effect these interventions had on the local economy brought about the social unrest which was the rationalization for the proclamation of martial law in 1972. By the time Marcos won his campaign and was ready for his second inauguration, the Philippines was already being described as a "social volcano ready to explode."

==== Marcos' term limits before martial law ====
The political and economic unrest of the early 1970s continued throughout the three and a half years of Marcos' second term, just as rumors proliferated that he would try to remain in power beyond the two terms allowed him by the 1935 Constitution of the Philippines. Marcos' move to create a new Philippine constitution by pushing for the creation of the 1971 Philippine Constitutional Convention lent credence to the belief that Marcos wanted to stay in power, especially when delegate Eduardo Quintero implicated Imelda Marcos in a payoff scheme for delegates who voted against the "Block Marcos" amendments which would disallow Marcos from running again.

==== Anti-communist rhetoric ====
When Marcos became president in 1965, the old Partido Komunista ng Pilipinas was a weakened organization, and the Hukbalahap reduced to "what amounted to banditry." The new Communist Party of the Philippines was established in 1968, and was able to form an armed wing in 1969 by allying with Hukbalahap commander Bernabe Buscayno to create New People's Army.

Although the CPP-NPA was only a small force and could not present a sizeable threat to the AFP at the time, Marcos painted an image of a huge "communist threat," both to court the Johnson administration's political support in light of its cold war policies, and drumming up local support as the Philippines was caught up in the same red scare which affected the US. This had the effect of mythologizing the group, with noted security specialist Richard J. Kessler observing that it invested the CPP with "a revolutionary aura that only attracted more supporters."

==== Incidents of unrest ====
The effects of the Balance of Payments crisis started making themselves felt almost immediately after Marcos second inauguration, setting the stage for several events which Marcos eventually cited as justifications for martial law. This included the First Quarter Storm protests of January to March 1970; the MV Karagatan and PMA armoury incidents which were alleged to be efforts of the NPA to acquire arms; the Plaza Miranda bombing in August 1971; Marcos' resulting suspension of the privilege of the writ of habeas corpus, which led to the radicalization of many students; a series of bombings in Metro Manila throughout the first nine months of 1972; and an alleged assassination attempt against Defense Minister Juan Ponce Enrile.

Economic difficulties experienced by Filipinos in the immediate aftermath of the 1969 Philippine balance of payments crisis led to the first major incident of unrest associated with Marcos' proclamation of martial law—the First Quarter Storm. This was a period of civil unrest from January to March 1970 organized by students and labor groups to protest authoritarianism, alleged election cheating, and corruption under Marcos. Protests were attended by an estimated 50,000 to 100,000 persons. By the end of this period, at least two activists were confirmed dead and several were injured by the police.

Another justification the Marcos government cited as a justification for martial law was the acquisition of arms by the New People's Army. the 1970 PMA armory raid saw the capture rifles, machine guns, grenade launchers, a bazooka and thousands of rounds of ammunition by NPA forces when Philippine Military Academy instructor Lt. Victor Corpuz defected from the Armed Forces of the Philippines and joined the NPA. Corpuz was involved in yet another attempt to acquire arms for the NPA when he led an unsuccessful attempt to smuggle armaments from China into the Philippines via the ship MV Karagatan in July 1972, although Marcos' opponents, including The Conjugal Dictatorship author Primitivo Mijares, the Liberal Party, as well as the Lópezes' Manila Chronicle, called the MV Karagatan incident a "show" or "a hoax".

A specific incident brought up by Marcos as a rationalization for martial law was the 1971 Plaza Miranda bombing of August 21, 1971. Unidentified suspects throwing two fragmentation grenades onto the stage while the opposition (Liberal Party) was having their miting de avance in Plaza Miranda. It took nine lives and left more than 100 people seriously wounded, including Jovito Salonga, who nearly died and was visually impaired ever since.

Suspicion of responsibility for the blast fell upon Marcos, leading to a landslide win for the Liberal Party's candidates. In later years, Salonga stated in his autobiography that he suspected that the Communist Party of the Philippines under José María Sison was responsible for the blast—an interpretation later corroborated by unnamed former Communist Party of the Philippines officials interviewed with The Washington Post in 1989, which alleged that "Sison had calculated that Marcos could be provoked into cracking down on his opponents, thereby driving thousands of political activists into the underground."

In any case, Marcos responded by suspending the writ of habeas corpus, an act which radicalized many of the Philippines activists, convincing both moderates and radicals that the Marcos administration could only be fought by joining the NPA.

This was then followed by the 1972 Manila bombings, "about twenty explosions which took place in various locations in Metro Manila in the months after the Plaza Miranda bombing and immediately preceding Ferdinand Marcos' proclamation of Martial Law". The first of these bombings took place on March 15, 1972, and the last took place on September 11, 1972—twelve days before martial law was announced on September 23 of that year.

One final incident associated with the proclamation of martial law took place just a handful of hours before Marcos' forces began arresting opposition members—the alleged September 22, 1972 assassination attempt on Defense Minister Juan Ponce Enrile. There was some controversy whether the ambush was staged, with Enrile denying that it was staged in his 2012 memoir. However, multiple other accounts including those of former president Fidel V. Ramos, former Marcos PR strategist Primitivo Mijares, businessman Oscar Lopez who lived near the site of the alleged ambush at the time, and Enrile's own wife Cristina Enrile, have all stated that the ambush had been faked. Enrile himself had publicly stated on February 22, 1986, that the ambush had been faked.

=== Marcos's reasons for declaring martial law ===
Numerous reasons have been put forward for why Marcos declared martial law in September 1972, some of which were presented by the Marcos administration as official justifications, and some of which were perspectives proposed by the opposition figures, and some of which were later put forward by historians and analysts studying the political economy of the decision.

==== Official justifications ====
In his 1987 treatise, Dictatorship & Martial Law: Philippine Authoritarianism in 1972, University of the Philippines public administration professor Alex Brillantes Jr. identifies three reasons expressed by the Marcos administration, saying that martial law:

- was a response to various leftist and rightist plots against the Marcos administration;
- was just the consequence of political decay after American-style democracy failed to take root in Philippine society; and
- was a reflection of Filipino society's history of authoritarianism and supposed need for iron-fisted leadership.

The first two justifications were explicitly stated in Proclamation 1081, which cited two explicit justifications: "to save the republic" (from various plots); and "to reform society" (after the failure of American-style democracy). The third rationalization arose from the administration's propaganda, which portrayed Marcos as a hypermasculine or ultranationalist figure able to compel the obedience of supposedly "spoiled" Filipinos.

==== Dissenting perspectives ====
===== Political mainstream =====
Opposition to Marcos' declaration of martial law ran the whole gamut of Philippine society—ranging from impoverished peasants whom the administration tried to chase out of their homes; to the Philippines' political old-guard, whom Marcos had tried to displace from power; to academics and economists who disagreed with the specifics of Marcos' martial law policies. All of these, regardless of their social position or policy beliefs, subscribed to the interpretation that Marcos declared martial law:

- as a strategy to enable Ferdinand Marcos to stay in power past the two presidential terms allowed him under Philippine Constitution of 1935; and
- as a technique for covering up the ill-gotten wealth of Marcos, his family, and his cronies.

===== Economic interpretations =====
In addition, some critics who ascribe an economic component to Marcos' motivations, suggesting that martial law:

- was an acquiescence to the global market system, which required tight control of sociopolitical systems so that the country's resources could be exploited efficiently;
- was a product of the infighting among the families that formed the upper socioeconomic class of Philippine society; and
- was a connivance between the state powers and the upper-class families to keep the members of the country's lower classes from becoming too powerful.

=== Proclamation of martial law ===
Shortly before midnight on September 22, 1972, Marcos' soldiers began arresting leading figures of the political opposition, beginning with Senator Benigno Aquino Jr. and Senator José W. Diokno. They continued into the early morning hours, closing down media outlets and arresting outspoken journalists and academics. Those arrested were gathered in Camp Crame were Philippine Constabulary chief asked them to cooperate, saying he had received "orders to neutralize [them]," and that he would try to "make things easier" for them. By morning on September 23, about a quarter of those whom Marcos had prioritized for arrest were already locked up in Crame, and Manila had gone into a media lockdown. At 7:30 that evening, Marcos announced that he had placed the country under martial law. In declaring martial law, Marcos dissolved Congress, padlocked the doors to the Batasang Pambansa, suspended the writ of habeas corpus and assumed both legislative and executive powers for himself as president, and defrayed the end of his last allowed presidential term under the 1935 Constitution of the Philippines, which was due to end in fifteen months.

One of the incidents of social unrest which Marcos eventually claimed led to his decision to declare martial law was the alleged 1972 Enrile ambush, which took place just a few hours before Marcos began making arrests. But Marcos announced that he had signed the formal declaration of martial law on September 21, the day before the ambush.

The implementation of martial law closely reflected Oplan Sagittarius, a military plans leaked to the Philippine Senate by general Marcos Soliman the week before. And Marcos aide-turned whistleblower Primitivo Mijares later claimed that "The beginning infrastructure for martial law was actually laid down as early as the first day of his assumption of the Philippine presidency on December 30, 1965."

=== Referendum and legal challenges ===
While Marcos and Enrile claimed that martial law was designed to "emasculate all the leaders [of the opposition] in order to control the situation" from the beginning, Marcos still needed to contend with international criticism and needed the political support of countries like the United States. To create a mandate for continuing to keep the Philippines under Military rule, Marcos ordered the conduct of several referendums over the next few years, the first of which took place in July 1973. (This should not be confused with the plebiscite that ratified the new constitution, which had been held in January earlier in that year.)

Martial law was ratified by 90.77% of the voters in the 1973 Philippine martial law referendum, although the referendum was marred with controversy. Primitivo Mijares, a Marcos detractor and author of the book Conjugal Dictatorship, alleged that there could not have been any valid referendum held from January 10 to 15, 1973 claiming the 35,000 citizen's assemblies never met and that voting was by show of hands.

The 1935 Constitution was replaced with the 1972 Constitution after the new constitution was ratified by 95% of the voters in the 1973 Philippine constitutional plebiscite. The Supreme Court affirmed the ratification of the 1972 Constitution in the case of Javellana vs. Executive Secretary, where the majority of the justices noted that while the 1972 Constitution was improperly ratified because it did not follow the procedure in the 1935 Constitution, there was no stopping the reality that the 1972 Constitution was already in effect. This decision became the cornerstone of subsequent decisions whenever the validity of the 1973 Constitution was questioned.

=== Human rights abuses ===
Under martial law there were widespread excesses and human rights abuses, even while the regime reduced violent urban crime, collected unregistered firearms, and suppressed communist insurgency in some areas; Liliosa Hilao was the first murder victim under Marcos' martial law. There were over 70,000 filed cases of human rights abuses today from this period. Torture methods employed by the army on their victims were extremely inhumane, which included beating, rape, electrocution, animal treatment, and mutilation among others. Many private establishments particularly media companies critical of the government were closed, and the arrest of activists were made through the Philippine Constabulary; many of the abuses were attributed to the latter, which was then headed by future president Fidel Ramos. There were at least 3,257 extrajudicial killings, 35,000 individual tortures, and 70,000 that were incarcerated. Of the 3,257 killed, some 2,520, or 77 percent of all victims, were salvaged—that is, tortured, mutilated, and dumped on a roadside for public display. It is also reported that 737 Filipinos disappeared between 1975 and 1985. The Civilian Home Defense Force, a precursor of Civilian Armed Forces Geographical Unit (CAFGU), was organized by President Marcos to battle with the communist and Islamic insurgency problem, has particularly been accused of notoriously inflicting human right violations on leftists, the NPA, Muslim insurgents, and rebels against the Marcos government.

Although Marcos declared an official end to martial law on January 17, 1981, the human rights abuses persisted and continued until the end of Marcos' tenure as president following the 1986 EDSA Revolution. In a report by the International Commission of Jurists (ICJ) on its mission to the Philippines from 31 December 1983 to 14 January 1984, various human rights abuses such as killing or "salvaging", arbitrary arrests and widespread detention for political crimes, and torture were documented. These abuses had been given some form of legal color because many of the offenses for which political detainees had been incarcerated were made legal by Marcos in the form of presidential decrees, after he assumed the power of the legislature to enact laws.

Apart from the continued increase in militarization despite the supposed end of martial law, the mission reported extensive extrajudicial killings and enforced disappearances of various individual arrested by or taken by military or state security forces. This practice had been called "salvaging" to mean summary executions and extrajudicial killings of individuals last seen with state agents, and found dead days later. In the first nine months of 1983 alone, the Task Force Detainees of the Philippines had reported at least 191 cases of salvaging, a number that may have been grossly underestimated and underreported because of the lack of trained and willing documenters during the period. Arrests and detention were also widespread, often in relation to dissent from government policies that was taken as evidence of rebellion, subversion, and connection with the New People's Army. Among those arrested and detained were church workers, human rights activists, legal aid lawyers, labor leaders, and journalists. These detainees were often held for long periods of time without trial and released later on for insufficiency of evidence. Marcos' direct involvement with these arrests and detention cannot be denied as any person may be arrested on the basis of a personal order under a presidential commitment order (PCO), and later on, preventive detention action (PDA). It was judicially established that the issuance of a PCO, which justifies an arrest, was the exclusive prerogative of the president; that Marcos authorized many of the arrests is widely documented.

Moreover, many of the detainees were subjected to torture and inhumane treatment. Political prisoners of advanced age were denied or not given adequate access to medical treatment, contributing to the deterioration of their health. Prisoners were placed in small detention cells unfit for human living conditions, often shared with other detainees. Various forms of torture such as repeated physical beating, cigarette burning, genital mutilation, asphyxiation and waterboarding became common reports of detainees. Some detainees were also taken to "safehouses" or unknown detention locations to prevent access by the families and lawyers.

"Hamletting" or the herding of rural residents into a special camp by military or state authorities was also common. Residents were uprooted from their homes and relocated in special grouping centers supposedly to keep them from the NPA. However, many farmers and residents who were forced to leave their homes claim that the true intent was to displace them from their land so that corporations or government officials may gain access and use of said lands. Although the government denied authorizing the hamletting through the issuance of the so-called Enrile Memorandum in March 1982, incidents of hamletting tripled by 1984. People who were displaced lost access to their livelihood and properties, and had no access to adequate housing, safe drinking water and sanitation in their places of relocation. The Integrated bar of the Philippines opposed hamletting because it constituted restriction on the freedom of movement and was a violation of the liberty of abode and freedom to travel. It also mean deprivation of property without due process as the hamletting was implemented by force and often with threat of bodily harm to the residents.

Although these abuses happened nationwide, they were particularly pervasive in Mindanao where about 60 percent of military force had been concentrated. Reportedly, military power was extensively deployed to Mindanao not just to quell the NPA and the Moro National Liberation Front but to facilitate the penetration of multi-national business concerns. Settlers and tribal groups have been evicted from their lands, and those who had legitimate grievances were suppressed by the military.

=== Arrests of the media and the opposition ===
After martial law was declared, critics of the government were arrested, which included then Senators Benigno Aquino Jr. and José W. Diokno, and Manila journalists—Manila Times publisher Chino Roces and columnist Max Soliven; Manila Chronicle publisher Eugenio Lopez Jr. and his editor Amando Doronila; Philippines Free publisher-editor Teodoro Locsín Sr. and his staff writer Napoleon Rama; and Press Foundation of Asia joint executive Juan L. Mercado. Many of those who were arrested were later freed without charges, but Benigno Aquino Jr. was charged and convicted along with his two co-accused, NPA leaders Bernabe Buscayno (Commander Dante) and Lt. Victor Corpuz, of illegal possession of fire arms, subversion, and murder, and was sentenced by a military court to death by firing squad. The death sentence was never carried out by the Marcos government.

The government captured NPA leaders Bernabe Buscayno in 1976 and Jose Maria Sison in 1977. The Washington Post in an interview with unnamed former Philippine Communist Party officials, stated that, "they (local communist party officials) wound up languishing in China for 10 years as unwilling "guests" of the (Chinese) government, feuding bitterly among themselves and with the party leadership in the Philippines".

=== Proclamation 2045 and continued dictatorship ===
Martial law was lifted by President Marcos on January 17, 1981, through Proclamation 2045.

However, Marcos continued to rule the country while retaining virtually all of the executive powers he held as dictator, through a combination of the 1972 constitution and the various decrees he had put in place before martial law, which all remained in effect.

This continued until 1986 when he went to exile after the People Power Revolution which was also the time for military officers to defend their wealth, according to journalist Rene Alviar.

== Under the Arroyo administration ==
On December 4, 2009, through Proclamation No. 1959, President Gloria Macapagal Arroyo officially placed Maguindanao province under a state of martial law, thereby suspending the privilege of the writ of habeas corpus. Executive Secretary Eduardo Ermita said the step was taken to avert the escalation of "lawless" violence in the province and pave the way for the swift arrest of the suspects in the massacre. Following the declaration, authorities carried out a raid on a warehouse owned by Andal Ampatuan Jr. The raid resulted in the confiscation of more than 330,000 rounds of 5.56×45mm NATO ammunition, a Humvee, and an improvised armored vehicle. Twenty militiamen were arrested on the premises. Captain James Nicolas of Special Forces was able to retrieve more high powered firearms and ammo after the incident. The state of martial law in Maguindanao was lifted on December 13, 2009.

== Under the Duterte administration ==
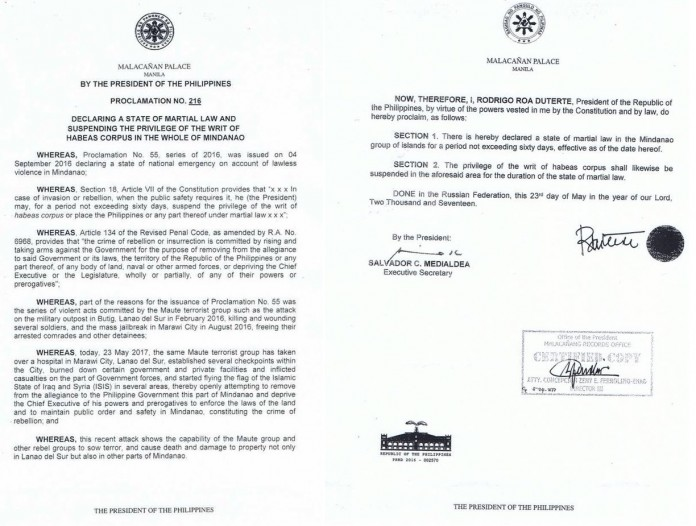
Proclamation Number 216 declaring martial law in Mindanao.

Due the escalation of conflicts in Mindanao and clashes in Marawi City related to the Maute Group, President Rodrigo Duterte placed Mindanao and its nearby islands under martial law at 10:00 p.m. (UTC+8) on May 23, 2017. This was announced during a briefing held in Moscow, where President Duterte was on an official visit, and was in effect for 60 days. Presidential Spokesperson Ernesto Abella said the declaration was possible given the "existence of rebellion," while Foreign Secretary Alan Peter Cayetano explained that the step was taken with of "the safety, the lives and property of people of Mindanao" in mind. Implementation is to be pursuant to the 1987 Constitution, which provides for a maximum 60-day-state of martial law without Congress approval for extension, the continuation of government functions, and the safeguard of individual freedoms. However, President Duterte insisted that it will not be any different from martial law under President Marcos.

While the declaration did not currently affect citizens and government units in Luzon or the Visayas, President Duterte suggested that he might extend martial law to the entire country if needed to "protect the people."

The imposition of martial rule has been generally peaceful in Davao City and other major cities in Mindanao, except Lanao del Sur and Lumad communities in the eastern and southern provinces.

Lumads, or the non-Muslim indigenous peoples of Mindanao, have been vocally against the imposition of martial rule due to the past experience of martial law during the Marcos dictatorship. After three months since the imposition of martial rule, numerous human rights violations were recorded by independent human rights organizations. Among these violations caused by the Armed Forces of the Philippines and the Philippine National Police were the bombing of Lumad schools, the food blockade against Lumad communities which forced Lumads to go hungry and move away from their ancestral lands, the capturing of ancestral lands from indigenous Lumads, the killing of Lumads who were suspected of being part of the NPA despite no concrete investigation, the censorship of various media outlets in Lumad communities, and the killing of numerous Lumad leaders, which has led to a blow in Lumad morale. President Rodrigo Duterte himself voiced his approval on the bombing of Lumad schools through a public speech.

The Philippine Commission on Human Rights and Human Rights Watch stated that the bombing of schools violates international humanitarian law and constitutes a war crime.

Reports also surfaced during and after the Battle of Marawi, stating that members of the Armed Forces of the Philippines and Philippine National Police stole jewelries.

== See also ==
- List of films about martial law under Ferdinand Marcos
