= Primitivo Mijares =

Filipino journalist and whistleblower

Primitivo M. Mijares
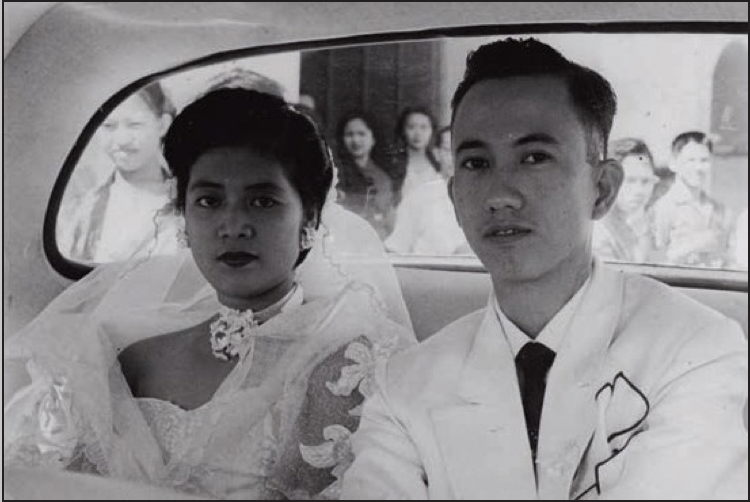
- Wedding photo of Primitivo Mijares and Priscilla Mijares
- Born: Primitivo Medrana Mijares; November 17, 1931; Santo Tomas, Batangas, Philippine Islands
- Disappeared: 1977 (aged 45–46)
- Other name: Tibo
- Education: Lyceum of the Philippines University (BA, LL.B.)
- Occupations: journalist, writer, lawyer, spokesperson, editor, whistleblower
- Known for: Testifying the illegal activities of the Marcos dictatorship
- Spouses: Priscilla Castillo Vda. de Mijares (m. 1956) Virginia Concha (m. 1969)
- Children: 4
- Parent(s): Jose Malatag Mijares (father); Florentina "Perla" Medrana Mijares (mother)

Primitivo "Tibo" Medrana Mijares (November 17, 1931 – disappeared 1977) was a Filipino journalist, author, war hero, and former press censor and propagandist. He was a reporter of the Philippines Daily Express, a newspaper in circulation during the regime of former Philippine President Ferdinand Marcos.

On October 23, 1974, Mijares fled the Philippines for the United States, later issuing a defection statement in the United States on February 5, 1975. He would then testify about tortures and corruption in the Marcos administration. Mijares was last seen in January 1977, boarding a flight from Guam to the Philippines with General Fabian Ver and a nephew of Querube Makalintal. He has been missing since.

== Early life and education ==
In his early years, Mijares lived in Santo Tomas, Batangas. He was orphaned at the age of 12 after his mother Perla Medrana and father Jose Mijares were killed by Japanese soldiers during World War II. As their house burned down, his father lay dead beside his dying mother, bleeding from bayonet wounds, whom he embraced. When Japanese soldiers attempted to commandeer the town's horses, Mijares deceived them by pretending to give orders to his horse, while actually telling the townsfolk to hide their horses in a local dialect. Following the war, he and his brother lived at La Trinidad, Benguet while his sisters moved to Borneo (now part of Sabah). The family's business was vinegar production. His father became a gunsmith of Paltik.

Mijares studied at La Trinidad Agricultural High School and became its "Mountain Breeze" editor. Mijares pursued a Bachelor of Arts and Bachelor of Laws degree in the Lyceum of the Philippines University, and passed the Philippine Bar Examination in 1960.

== Career ==
Mijares became an editor for the Baguio Midland Courier in 1950 and the Manila Chronicle in 1951. He and Marcos formed a close relationship after Mijares covered Marcos in the Manila Chronicle. He would write articles aimed at convincing Filipino citizens that martial law was needed, notably a press release for Juan Ponce Enrile's alleged ambush before such an ambush was set to happen. Mijares was later selected by Marcos as the presidential reporter for the Philippines Daily Express following its reopening after martial law was declared.

When Marcos established the Media Advisory Council in 1973, its ex-officio position of chairman was to be filled by the president of the National Press Club. He later told Mijares to run for the position, which he later won as he had no opponents.

== Defection and disappearance ==
Midway through the martial law period, Mijares became disgusted with the Marcos regime. In an interview with the Reno Gazette-Journal, he stated that he "felt guilty allowing all Marcos' friends to take over for nothing."

On October 23, 1974, Mijares fled the Philippines for the United States. He issued a defection statement in the United States on February 5, 1975, and began living in San Francisco, California.

On June 17, 1975, Mijares was to appear before a United States House International Relations subcommittee to testify claims of bribery, corruption, and fraud against Marcos. The night prior, Marcos made an international telephone call to Mijares, asking him not to testify. Guillermo de Vega then got on the line and offered Mijares US$50,000 (equivalent to US$299,165 in 2025) as a bribe. The following day, then-Philippine Consul General Trinidad Alconel called Mijares to reiterate the bribe, which was raised to US$100,000 (equivalent to US$598,330 in 2025). Mijares rejected the bribes and continued with his testimony as planned. Then-Information Secretary Francisco Tatad later said that Marcos denied ever making a telephone call to Mijares.

After his testimony, Mijares began writing a book entitled The Conjugal Dictatorship of Ferdinand and Imelda Marcos, which was published in 1976. The book contained a personal account of the Marcos regime.

Mijares' youngest grandson, Joseph Christopher "JC" Mijares Gurango (the son of Pilita, a medical doctor, daughter of Judge Priscilla de Villa) republished Conjugal Dictatorship, with 200 additional pages and launched at Bantayog ng mga Bayani on February 21, 2017.

Mijares made his final phone call to his family on January 23, 1977. Mijares was last seen in January 1977, boarding a flight from Guam to the Philippines with General Fabian Ver and a nephew of Querube Makalintal. Later attempts at finding him failed as there were no more traces of Mijares found. Urban legends claim that Mijares was forced off of a flying chopper midway between Guam and the Philippines, although his family has denied such claim.

== Personal life and legacy ==
Mijares was married in the Philippines to the future Pasay City RTC Branch 108 Judge Priscilla de Villa Castillo on February 23, 1956 in Manila. The couple had four children, Perla, Jose Antonio, Pilita, Luis Manuel ("Boyet"). The family lived in Project 6, Quezon City, with neighboring journalists. Mijares was also illegally married to Virginia Concha on September 6, 1969, in Reno, Nevada.

Months after Mijares' disappearance, their youngest son, Boyet, was kidnapped, brutally tortured, and killed. The Mijares home was wiretapped. The police called Boyet to tell him to meet his father. He was later found in an open field with his body completely mutilated. During this time, the assigned police officer, future presidential candidate Panfilo Lacson lied to Priscilla that her son was just joining a fraternity at the University of the Philippines. Author Author Raissa Robles paid tribute to his son Boyet in the introduction to her book Marcos Martial Law: Never Again.

Former Philippine senator Rene Saguisag has mentioned that of all the heroes featured at the Bantayog ng mga Bayani, Mijares is the one who deserved to be there the most, and was shocked that his name was yet to be included. This was after the museum hosted a symposium on Mijares.

== Works ==
Mijares only published one book, The Conjugal Dictatorship of Ferdinand and Imelda Marcos (1976), an exposé on the presidency of Ferdinand Marcos. The annotated version of the book was relaunched in 2017 by Mijares's grandson, JC Mijares Gurango, along with the Bantayog ng mga Bayani and Ateneo de Manila University Press. It was relaunched on February 21, right before the 31st anniversary of the People Power Revolution. After the People Power Revolution and again immediately after the 2022 Philippine general election, the book quickly sold out.

== In popular culture ==
The term conjugal dictatorship is generally used in pop culture and academic circles whenever there is mention of the Marcos dictatorship, due to Mijares's book which was his only book before his disappearance.

Mijares and his son Boyet were featured in a nine-minute song called, "Primitivo Mijares Requiem" which was sung by Jose Paulo dela Cruz and produced by Francis Tanseco, a painter in the United States whose works have been featured at the London embassy.

== See also ==
- Human rights abuses of the Marcos dictatorship
- Martial law under Ferdinand Marcos
- History of the Philippines (1965–1986)
