= The Conjugal Dictatorship of Ferdinand and Imelda Marcos =

1976 memoir by Primitivo Mijares

- Author: Primitivo Mijares
- Language: English
- Genre: Memoir
- Publisher: Ateneo de Manila University Press, University of Michigan
- Publication date: April 27, 1976
- Publication place: Philippines
- Media type: Print (hardback and paperback)
- Pages: 430

The Conjugal Dictatorship of Ferdinand and Imelda Marcos is a 1976 memoir written in exile by former press censor and propagandist Primitivo Mijares. It details the inner workings of martial law under President Ferdinand Marcos from Mijares' perspective.

The book's use of the term "conjugal dictatorship" has since been used specifically to describe the rule of Marcos and his wife, First Lady Imelda Marcos, and more generally to refer to a type of family dictatorship.

== Background and conception ==
A journalist who had become a propagandist and confidant for Ferdinand Marcos, Primitivo Mijares had served under Marcos since 1963 and claimed to have been privy to government's high-level doings. As Chairman of the National Press Club, Mijares ran the Media Advisory Council, a state agency established to censor the press in 1973. Upon the declaration of martial law in September 1972, and with the power to choose which media outlet would be re-opened, the Mijares-led Media Advisory Council was accused of abusing its role and was criticized as a "money-raising tool," leading one of its members, Emil Jurado, to resign. Mijares himself, after failing to account for NPC funds, ran away to the US, and joined Manglapus' Movement for a Free Philippines and wrote the book. Mijares said that he was offered a bribe amounting to US$100,000 to be dissuaded to testify about the human rights situation in the Philippines, and said that he refused the bribe. However, whether there was a bribe by Marcos' associates or whether Mijares himself extorted money from Marcos, and whether Mijares actually received money from Marcos remains unclear. Steve Psinakis, an anti-Marcos critic married into the Lopez family that owns ABS-CBN, wrote in his memoir "A Country Not Even His Own" (2008): "The investigation (referring to the U.S. Justice Department investigation) revealed that after his February 1975 defection, Mijares did, in fact extort money from Marcos by feeding him imaginary information for which Marcos was ignorant enough to pay considerable sums. While Mijares was still receiving money from Marcos, he was at the same time lambasting Marcos in the U.S. press, causing the Marcos regime irreparable damage. It is no wonder the only natural conclusion is that Marcos had his vengeance and did Mijares in."

Attempts to refute some of the book's claims have arisen after more than a decade since its publication. For example, the book insinuated that Marcos plotted the Plaza Miranda bombing to wipe out the entire Liberal Party leadership and that the weapon landing from China for the communists along the coast of Isabela was 'staged'. In 1989, four unnamed "former ranking Party officials" admitted to the plot to bomb Plaza Miranda, and former NPA Victor Corpus admitted that their plot was foiled when the weapons that they were about to receive from communist China was intercepted by the military.

=== Online release and revised edition reprint ===
In May 2016, the heirs of Primitivo Mijares released The Conjugal Dictatorship as a free e-book download from the Ateneo de Manila Rizal Library.

In February 2017, a revised and annotated reprint of the book was released by Mijares' grandson Joseph Christopher Mijares Gurango. The Mijares family admitted that what happened to Primitivo and his youngest son Boyet was so traumatic that they did not want to talk about it, but decided to break their silence with the resurgence of Marcos in the political scene, culminated by the burial of Marcos in the Libingan ng mga Bayani and near victory of the dictator's namesake and son, Ferdinand Jr., in the 2016 national elections. The revised edition was aimed for the "new generation of readers", referring to the millennials, as well as new annotations and "verification of sources".

== Usage of the term ==
While it does not refer to classical forms of diarchy, the qualifier "conjugal" points to absolute, non-monarchical power being held by two halves of a couple. During the Marcos regime, Imelda wielded much more influence than a typical First Lady through her many and varied official positions. These government appointments allowed her to build structures in and around the capital of Manila, and act as a de facto diplomat who traveled the world to meet state leaders.

Supporters, loyalists, and propagandists of the Marcos family criticize the term because they believe that the Marcos regime and Martial Law era was the "golden age" of the Philippines. The children of the Marcos couple, Imee, Bongbong, and Irene, also reject the term for their parents, believing it insulting to their legacy. Meanwhile, Marcos opponents use the word to highlight the couple’s excesses and plundering during their 20-year rule. Other critics, such as relatives of desaparecidos, also use the term to describe the human rights abuses of their joint rule.
