= Amando Doronila =

Filipino journalist (1928–2023)

Amando Ermitano Doronila
- Born: 6 February 1928; Dumangas, Iloilo, Philippine Islands
- Died: 7 July 2023 (aged 95); Canberra, Australia
- Education: University of the East (BA)
- Occupations: Journalist, newspaper publisher
- Known for: Editor in chief of the Manila Chronicle

Amando Ermitano Doronila (6 February 1928 – 7 July 2023) was a Filipino journalist, writer and newspaper publisher who covered Philippine politics from the 1960s to the early decades of the 21st century and was imprisoned and exiled by the Martial Law regime of President Ferdinand Marcos.

== Early life and education ==
Amando Ermitano Doronila was born on 6 February 1928 in Dumangas, Iloilo, to Arsenio Doronila and Marcelina Ermitano. He received a bachelor's degree in Business Administration from the University of East in 1953.

== Early journalistic career ==
Doronila's first foray into journalism was his tenure as editor in chief of UE's collegiate publication, The Dawn.

Doronila started his professional career as a reporter and columnist for the Manila Bulletin in the 1960s and was also a political columnist for the Daily Mirror from 1963 to 1972, as well as editor-in-chief of the Manila Chronicle. In between, he served as president of the National Press Club of the Philippines and a part-time journalism lecturer at the University of the Philippines.

== Martial law ==
As chief editor of the Chronicle, Doronila earned the ire of President Ferdinand Marcos for the paper's critical reporting on the administration. On 22 September 1972, he was among the first to be informed of the alleged ambush of Defense Secretary Juan Ponce Enrile, which was used by Marcos to proclaim martial law the following day. Newspapers critical of Marcos, including the Chronicle were shut down, while Doronila was among several journalists arrested and taken into military custody at the Philippine Constabulary headquarters in Camp Crame, Quezon City. He was later released in December after being made to promise not to participate in "anti-national activities," resume work without a military permit from the military, give or participate in any interview with local or foreign media, and was required to report periodically to the military.

In 1975, Doronila went into exile in Australia, where he settled in Melbourne and worked for The Age. In 1985, he returned to the Philippines to cover the decline and fall of the Marcos regime.

== Later journalistic career ==
After Marcos’ overthrow in the 1986 People Power Revolution, Doronila resumed his journalistic career in the Philippines. He initially worked for the Manila Times as a political columnist before returning to a revived Chronicle as its editor in chief until it ceased publication in 1998. Doronila was credited with introducing the word "demarcosify" in reference to efforts by the administration of Marcos' successor, Corazon Aquino, to undo the impact of his dictatorship. Afterwards, he became a political columnist for the Philippine Daily Inquirer, with his News Analysis section appearing on its front page from 1994 to 2016. One of his biggest journalistic scoops was his extensive coverage of the events leading to the ouster of President Joseph Estrada in 2001, which was subsequently syndicated by the Inquirer.

Doronila retired from journalism in 2016 and moved back to Australia to be with his family.

== Personal life and death ==
Doronila was married to Lourdes Silverio, who died in 2020, and had three children.

Amando Doronila died at the Calvary Hospital in Canberra on 7 July 2023, at the age of 95. He had contracted a respiratory syncytial virus, a complication of pneumonia, after receiving care for two years in a nursing home.

== Selected works ==
- The State, Economic Transformation, and Political Change in the Philippines, 1946-1972 (1991)
- The Fall of Joseph Estrada: The Inside Story (2001)
- Afro-Asia in Upheaval: A Memoir of Front-line Reporting (2008)
- Doro: Behind the Byline (2023)

== Selected awards ==
- Chino Roces Freedom Award (2002)
- Rotary Club's Journalism Hall of Fame (2003)
- National Book Award (2008)
