= University of East =

Private university in Hyderabad, Pakistan

University of EAST
- Type: Private
- Established: 1999; 27 years ago
- Affiliations: HEC
- Chancellor: Syed Wajahat Ali
- Location: Hyderabad, Sindh, Pakistan
- Website: uoe.edu.pk

The University of Engineering, Arts, Science and Technology or University of EAST (Sindhi: يونيورسٽي آف انجنيئرڱ، آرٽس، سائنس اينڊ ٽيڪنالاجي) is a private university in Hyderabad, Sindh, Pakistan.

The university was granted a charter under the University of East Act 1999 by the Sindh Legislature and was established in August 2004.

== Overview ==
The university was established with the objective of providing higher education in the fields of business, science, and technical education in Pakistan. It offers various teaching programs aimed at supporting the professional development of its students in these disciplines.

== Departments ==
The University of EAST consists of eleven academic departments:

- Business Administration
- Computer Science
- Education
- Electrical Technology
- English
- Information Technology
- Law
- Mechanical Technology
- Media Sciences
- Textile Management
- Urdu
