= Martial law under Ferdinand Marcos =

1972–1981 period in the Philippines

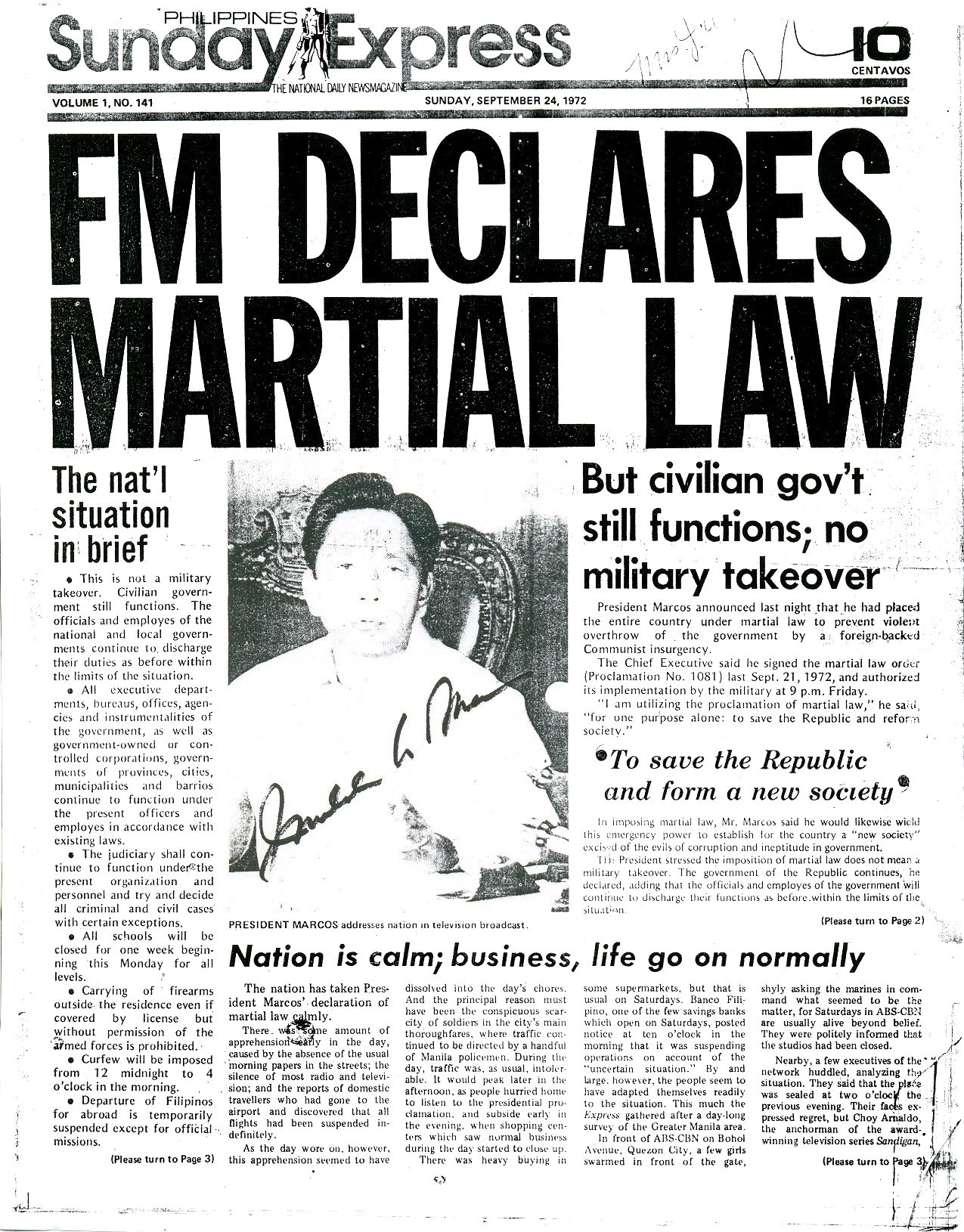
The Sunday edition of the Philippines Daily Express on September 24, 1972, was the only newspaper published after the announcement of martial law on September 23, the evening prior

At 7:15 p.m. on September 23, 1972, President Ferdinand Marcos announced on television that he had placed the Philippines under martial law, stating he had done so in response to the "communist threat" posed by the newly founded Communist Party of the Philippines (CPP), and the sectarian "rebellion" of the Muslim Independence Movement (MIM). Opposition figures of the time (such as Lorenzo Tañada, Jose W. Diokno, and Jovito Salonga) accused Marcos of exaggerating these threats and using them as an excuse to consolidate power and extend his tenure beyond the two presidential terms allowed by the 1935 constitution. Marcos signed Proclamation No. 1081 on September 21, 1972, marking the beginning of a fourteen-year period of one-man rule, which effectively lasted until Marcos was exiled from the country on February 25, 1986. Proclamation No. 1081 was formally lifted on January 17, 1981, by Proclamation No. 2045, although Marcos retained essentially all of his powers as dictator until he was ousted in February 1986.

This nine-year period in Philippine history is remembered for the Marcos administration's record of human rights abuses, particularly targeting political opponents, student activists, journalists, religious workers, farmers, and others who fought against the Marcos dictatorship. Based on the documentation of Amnesty International, Task Force Detainees of the Philippines, and similar human rights monitoring entities, historians believe that the Marcos dictatorship was marked by 3,257 known extrajudicial killings, 35,000 documented tortures, 737 enforced disappearances, and 70,000 incarcerations. After Marcos was ousted, government investigators discovered that the declaration of martial law had also allowed the Marcoses to hide secret stashes of unexplained wealth that various courts later determined to be "of criminal origin".

While Marcos's presidency began in late 1965, this article is limited to the period in which he exercised dictatorial powers under martial law, and the period where he continued to wield those powers despite lifting the proclamation in 1981.

== Explanations for the declaration of martial law ==
Numerous explanations have been put forward as reasons for Marcos to declare martial law in September 1972, some of which were presented by the Marcos administration as official justifications, and some of which were dissenting perspectives put forward by either the mainstream political opposition or by analysts studying the political economy of the decision.

=== Official justifications ===
In his 1987 treatise, Dictatorship & Martial Law: Philippine Authoritarianism in 1972, University of the Philippines public administration professor Alex Brillantes Jr. identifies three reasons expressed by the Marcos administration, saying that martial law:

- was a response to various leftist and rightist plots against the Marcos administration;
- was just the consequence of political decay after American-style democracy failed to take root in Philippine society; and
- was a reflection of Filipino society's history of authoritarianism and supposed need for iron-fisted leadership.

The first two justifications were explicitly stated in Proclamation 1081, which cited two explicit justifications: "to save the republic" (from various plots); and "to reform society" (after the failure of American-style democracy). The third rationalization arose from the administration's propaganda, which portrayed Marcos as a hypermasculine or ultranationalist figure able to compel the obedience of supposedly "spoiled" Filipinos.

=== Dissenting perspectives ===
==== Political mainstream ====
Opposition to Marcos's declaration of martial law ran the whole gamut of Philippine society – ranging from impoverished peasants whom the administration tried to chase out of their homes; to the Philippines' political old-guard, whom Marcos had tried to displace from power; to academics and economists who disagreed with the specifics of Marcos's martial law policies. All of these, regardless of their social position or policy beliefs, subscribed to the interpretation that Marcos declared martial law:

- as a strategy to enable Ferdinand Marcos to stay in power past the two Presidential terms allowed him under Philippine Constitution of 1935; and
- as a technique for covering up the ill-gotten wealth of Marcos, his family, and his cronies.

==== Economic interpretations ====
In addition, some critics who ascribe an economic component to Marcos's motivations, suggesting that martial law:

- was an acquiescence to the global market system, which required tight control of sociopolitical systems so that the country's resources could be exploited efficiently;
- was a product of the infighting among the families that formed the upper socioeconomic class of Philippine society; and
- was a connivance between the state powers and the upper-class families to keep the members of the country's lower classes from becoming too powerful.

== Planning and preparation for martial law ==
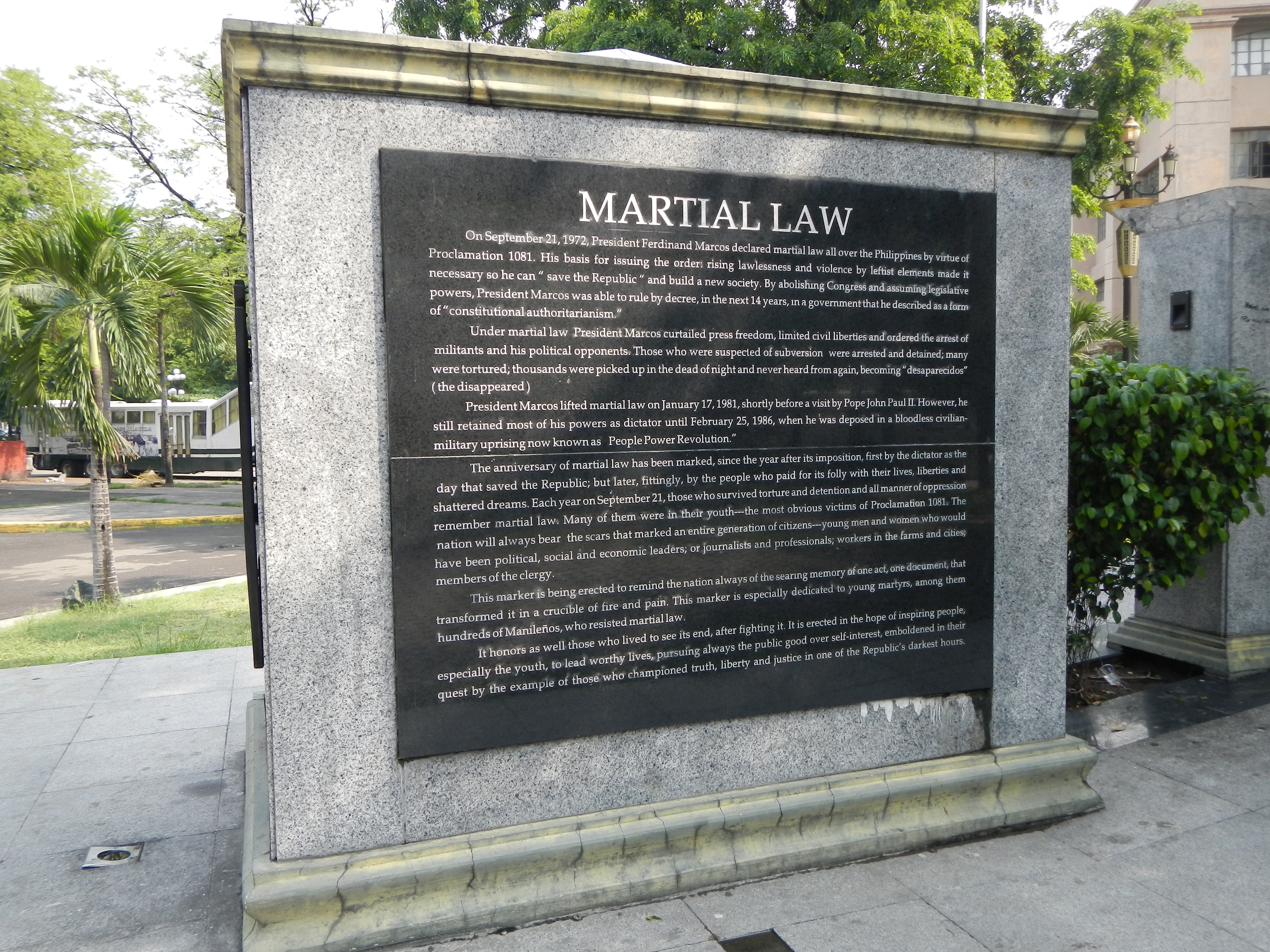
Martial law monument in Mehan Garden

Although Marcos initially claimed that he had declared martial law in response to violent acts that took place in 1971–72 – such as the Plaza Miranda bombing and the alleged assassination attempt on Defense Secretary Enrile – the groundwork for its implementation had been laid down much earlier. Marcos's aide-turned whistleblower Primitivo Mijares noted that "The beginning infrastructure for martial law was actually laid down as early as the first day of his assumption of the Philippine presidency on December 30, 1965."

Most notably, by the time Marcos declared martial law in September 1972, he had:

- assured the loyalty of state institutions – especially the Armed Forces – to himself;
- appointed 8 out of 11 justices of the Philippines' Supreme Court;
- gained the support of the Nixon administration; and
- carefully crafted a public relations environment that ensured that the majority of Filipino citizens would at least initially accept martial law.

=== Controlling the armed forces and police ===
==== Defense secretary portfolio ====
Marcos began increasing his influence over the armed forces of the Philippines as soon as he became president in 1965 by following President Ramon Magsaysay's precedent of concurrently hold the portfolio of defense secretary in the first thirteen months of his presidency. American defense analyst Donald Berlin notes that this gave Marcos an opportunity for direct interaction with the AFP's leaders, and a hand in the military's day-to-day operationalization. Singaporean author and political science professor Terence Lee notes that this had the effect of "develop[ing] a patronage system within the defense establishment." Professor Albert Celoza, in his 1997 book on the political economy of authoritarianism in the Philippines, notes that: "It was alleged that a plan of action had existed as early as 1965...no one opposed the plan because no one was certain that the plan would be carried out."

==== Armed Forces of the Philippines reshuffle ====
Marcos soon carried out the "largest reshuffle in the history of the armed forces" when he forcibly retired fourteen of the AFP's twenty-five flag officers, including the AFP Chief of Staff, the AFP Vice Chief of Staff, the commanding general of the Philippine Army, the Chief of the Philippine Constabulary, the commanders of all four Constabulary Zones, and one third of all Provincial Commanders of the PC.

One prominent early example of an officer forced to resign his commission was Navy Commodore Ramon Alcaraz – a World War II hero who would eventually be dubbed the "father of the Philippine Marines" and have a Philippine Navy ship named after him. Alcaraz was forced to resign from the Armed Forces because his success in the Navy's anti-smuggling operations had come into conflict with Marcos's accommodations with alleged "smuggler-king" Lino Bocalan.

In their place, Marcos appointed officers from his home region, the Ilocos, the most significant of whom had familial connections to Marcos – ensuring their familial and regionalistic loyalties to him. The practice was so pervasive that it quickly earned a moniker: "Ilocanization". The most important of these appointments included Juan Ponce Enrile as Secretary of Defense, and Fidel Ramos as Armed Forces Vice Chief of Staff, who were both related to Marcos; and Fabian Ver, Marcos's townmate from Sarrat, Ilocos Norte, as Armed Forces Chief of Staff.

In tandem with this "Ilocanization", generals loyal to Marcos were allowed to stay in their positions past their supposed retirement age, or were rewarded with civilian government posts. This led to a loss of morale among the middle-ranks of the AFP, because it meant a significant slowdown in promotions and caused many officers to retire with ranks much lower than they would otherwise have earned.

As a result, Security Affairs Professor Douglas J. Macdonald noted that "near the end of the dictatorship, the Military and the Intelligence organizations were badly polarized along generational lines, as they are today."

==== Barangay Self Defense Units and Civilian Home Defense Forces ====
In June 1970, Marcos authorized the creation of civil militias called "Barangay Self Defense Units", which would be renamed the Civilian Home Defense Forces in 1977 through Presidential Decree 1016. At its inception, the CHDF numbered 73,000 men, and it earned a reputation as the perpetrators of the worst human rights violations during martial law.

==== The "Oplan Sagittarius" expose ====
When Marcos was ready to declare martial law, copies of the plan for its implementation were distributed to key officials within the Armed Forces. As a way of assuring that any whistleblowers would be easily accounted for, the copies of the plan were distributed with codeword titles taken from the signs of the Zodiac. The copy marked "Sagittarius" was given to General Marcos "Mark" Soliman who commanded the National Intelligence Coordinating Agency. Thus, when Senator Benigno "Ninoy" Aquino Jr. exposed the existence of "Oplan Sagittarius" a week before martial law was declared, other generals were able to deny that they had heard of any operation under the said code title, and it was easy for Marcos to pinpoint Soliman as the whistleblower who gave the information to Aquino.

Not long after the declaration of martial law, the controlled press reported that Soliman had died of a heart attack, but his family believed that Marcos had ordered that he be killed. Marcos then dissolved the National Intelligence Coordinating Agency (NICA) and put a powerful super-agency, the National Intelligence and Security Authority (NISA) in its place, with steadfast Marcos follower General Fabian Ver in command.

=== Ensuring political support from the United States government ===
By 1971, Marcos had reached out to US Ambassador to the Philippines Henry Byroade, with the question of whether the United States, then under the administration of President Richard Nixon, would support him should he choose to proclaim Martial Law. Byroade brought the matter up with Nixon in a conversation in January 1971. According to the US National Archives' copy of the Memorandum of Conversation between Nixon and Byroade:

The president declared that we would "absolutely" back Marcos up, and "to the hilt" so long as what he was doing was to preserve the system against those who would destroy it in the name of liberty. The President indicated that... we would not support anyone who was trying to set himself up as military dictator, but we would do everything we can to back a man who was trying to make the system work and to preserve order. Of course, we understood that Marcos would not be entirely motivated by national interests, but this was something which we had come to expect from Asian leaders.

Marcos informed the US Ambassador to the Philippines about his intent to declare Martial Law plan as early as September 17, 1972, just a few days before Martial Law was announced on September 23, 1972.

After Nixon, the Ford and Reagan administrations were similarly supportive of Marcos. While the Carter administration expressed diplomatic concerns over the human rights abuses of the Marcos dictatorship, it could not totally withdraw its support from Marcos in light of US foreign policy's need to have the lease on the US bases in the Philippines renewed by Marcos.

== The role of the Communist Party of the Philippines ==
Of the various threats cited in the Proclamation 1081 document as rationalizations for declaration of Martial Law, the most extensively described was the threat supposedly posed by communist insurgents – specifically the newly formed Communist Party of the Philippines, a Maoist organization which had only recently broken off from the Marxist–Leninist Partido Komunista ng Pilipinas.

=== The "Red Scare" in the Philippines and the Anti-Subversion Act ===
When Marcos became president in 1965, Philippine policy and politics functioned under a Post-World War II geopolitical framework. After gaining independence from the US after the war, the Philippines had retained strong economic, political and military ties to the United States, manifested in a Mutual Defense Treaty (MDT), Military Assistance Agreement (MAA), a US Military Advisory Group (JUSMAG), and the physical presence of several Military Bases where the US Military could conduct "unhampered US military operations" for 99 years (later reduced to 50).

Filipino presidents were very politically dependent on American support, and this did not change until the end of the Cold War in 1989, and the termination of the 1947 US Military Bases Treaty, in 1992.

With its close ties to the US, the Philippines was ideologically caught up in the anticommunist scare perpetuated by the US during the Cold War. The government was not yet strongly-established, and it was "fearful of being swept away by [communism]'s rising tide", so in 1957, it passed Republic Act (RA) No. 1700, known as the "Anti-Subversion Act of 1957", which made mere membership in any communist party illegal. The Philippines would take three and a half decades to repeal it, through Republic Act 7636, in 1992.

RA No. 1700 was originally meant to counter the Partido Komunista ng Pilipinas (PKP) and its armed force, the Hukbalahap (also called the "Huks"). The campaign against the PKP and the Huks was bloody, but it had basically ended by 1954. Throughout the 60s, the remnants of the PKP pursued "a course of peaceful action" while working to rebuild their organisation, but, this was later challenged by a youth-based Maoist group within the organization created by University Professor Jose Maria Sison, who joined the PKP in 1962. Clashing with the PKP party leaders' view that armed struggle was an exercise in futility, Sison and his group were expelled from the PKP in 1967, and on December 26, 1968, founded the Communist Party of the Philippines (CPP) along Maoist lines. While the PKP sought to marginalize this new group, it soon became the leading communist party in the Philippines.

=== Marcos and anti-communist rhetoric ===
When Marcos became president in 1965, the PKP was a weakened organization, and the Hukbalahap reduced to "what amounted to banditry." But Marcos immediately made noise about the supposed "communist threat" – drawing on images of the bloody Huk encounters of the 1950s, and courting the Johnson administration's political support in light of the U.S.' recent entry into the Vietnam war.

Marcos continued using communism as a bogeyman after 1968, as the PKP faded into obscurity and the nascent CPP became more prominent. The Armed Forces of the Philippines did likewise in 1969, when the CPP allied with Huk commander Bernabe Buscayno to create the nascent New People's Army. Although the CPP-NPA was only a small force at the time, the AFP hyped up its formation, partly because doing so was good for building up the AFP budget. As a result, notes security specialist Richard J. Kessler, "the AFP mythologized the group, investing it with a revolutionary aura that only attracted more supporters."

Even in the days immediately before Marcos's declaration of Martial Law on September 23, 1972, the Philippine National Security Council did not consider the two communist movements to represent a sizeable threat. At around that time, the US Senate Committee on Foreign Relations received notice that as of September 19, 1972, the Philippine Council had set their threat assessment at "between 'normal' and 'Internal Defense Condition 1'" on a scale where 3 was the highest Defense condition. In 1971, AFP Chief of Staff Manuel T. Yan had prominently told media that the grounds for Marcos to either impose of martial law or suspend the privilege of the writ of habeas corpus did not exist. One of the generals serving under General Fabian Ver of the National Intelligence and Security Authority later recalled that "Even when Martial Law was declared, the communists were not a real threat. The military could handle them."

=== Confirmed incidents ===
Despite historical consensus that the Marcos administration willfully exaggerated the capabilities and actions of the Communist Party of the Philippines, a few of the incidents cited by Marcos have been confirmed as genuine activities of the CPP. These included: the December 1970 raid on the Philippine Military Academy's armory by defecting army officer Victor Corpus; and the July 1972 MV Karagatan incident in which a secret arms shipment from China, meant for Communist Party forces, sank just off Digoyo Point in Palanan, Isabela.

=== Disputed incidents ===
Numerous other incidents cited by Marcos as rationalizations for his declaration of Martial Law have either been discredited or disputed, in light of Marcos's known tactic of undertaking false flag operations as a propaganda technique.

This includes: the August 1971 Plaza Miranda bombing; the 1972 Manila bombings from March to September of that year; and the alleged September 1972 ambush of Defense Minister Juan Ponce Enrile.

=== Radicalization of moderate activists ===
The social unrest of 1969 to 1970, and the violent dispersal of the resulting "First Quarter Storm" protests were among the early watershed events in which large numbers of Filipino students of the 1970s were radicalized against the Marcos administration. Due to these dispersals, many students who had previously held "moderate" positions (i.e., calling for legislative reforms) became convinced that they had no choice but to call for more radical social change.

Other watershed events that would later radicalize many otherwise "moderate" opposition members include the February 1971 Diliman Commune; the August 1971 suspension of the writ of habeas corpus in the wake of the Plaza Miranda bombing; the September 1972 declaration of Martial Law; the 1980 murder of Macli-ing Dulag; and the August 1983 assassination of Ninoy Aquino.

This radicalization led to a significant growth of the Communist Party of the Philippines under the Marcos administration. Writer and peace advocate Gus Miclat cites the example of Mindanao: "There was not one NPA cadre in Mindanao in 1972. Yes, there were activists, there were some firebrands... but there were no armed rebels then except for those that eventually formed the Moro National Liberation Front. When Marcos fled in 1986, the NPA was virtually in all Mindanao provinces, enjoying even a tacit alliance with the MNLF."

== Signing of Proclamation No. 1081 ==
Several conflicting accounts about exist regarding the exact date on which Marcos signed the physical Proclamation No. 1081 document, which placed the entirety of the Philippines under martial law.

Whichever the case, the document was formally dated September 21 because of his superstitions and numerological beliefs concerning the number seven. The Official Gazette of the republic of the Philippines, in a retrospective article on Marcos's proclamation of martial law, comments on the differences in the accounts:

"Whether they conflict or not, all accounts indicate that Marcos's obsession with numerology (particularly the number seven) necessitated that Proclamation No. 1081 be officially signed on a date that was divisible by seven. Thus, September 21, 1972 became the official date that martial law was established and the day that the Marcos dictatorship began. This also allowed Marcos to control history on his own terms."

== Announcement and implementation of martial law ==
September 22, 1972, marked a brief period in which Proclamation No. 1081 was formally in place, but without the knowledge of the public. For most of the Philippines, therefore, martial law was thus properly implemented when it was announced on the evening of September 23, 1972.

The implementation of martial law began sometime before midnight on September 22, with the arrest of the two main opposition leaders, Ninoy Aquino, who on September 21 held a Congress speech to denounce impending martial law, and Jose W. Diokno, who held a rally with 50,000 people from the Movement of Concerned Citizens for Civil Liberties (MCCCL) at Plaza Miranda on the same day. By dawn of the following day, many of the 400 individuals listed on the military's priority arrest list—journalists, members of the political opposition, constitutional convention delegates, outspoken lawyers, teachers, and students—had been detained.

Media outlets were shuttered, although those linked with Marcos crony Roberto Benedicto were allowed to reopen within the day. Soon after, Congress was abolished, mass activities were prohibited, political parties were outlawed, a curfew was put in place, and civil and political rights were suspended.

=== First wave of arrests ===
The first wave of arrests under Marcos's declaration of martial law began with the arrest of Senator Ninoy Aquino late in the evening of September 22, during a late meeting of the Joint Congressional Committee on Tariff Reforms at the Manila Hilton Hotel. Aquino was one of Marcos's most prominent critics, and had exposed the plan to proclaim martial law in a speech in the Philippine Senate the week before.

Juan Ponce Enrile would later acknowledge that the first wave of arrests focused on political figures and journalists "in the initial stages, we must emasculate all the leaders in order to control the situation."

The arrest of others took place after midnight in the early morning hours of September 23. Martial law forces were sent out to arrest 400 individuals on their priority target list. By 1:00 am, Senator Jose W. Diokno had been arrested at his residence in Makati, as had poet-Senator Soc Rodrigo as of 2:00 a.m. that day. Vice President Fernando Lopez, who had resigned from his cabinet positions in the Marcos administration after accusing Marcos of corruption and power-grabbing, was on the priority list but was overseas at the time of the declaration. Sergio Osmeña Jr., who had run against Marcos in the contentious election of 1969, was also abroad at the time and was not caught. In their place, Lopez's nephew Eugenio Lopez Jr. and Osmeña's son Sergio Osmeña III were arrested in what international media described as an act of extortion designed to undermine their families' financial empires.

By the dawn of September 23, 100 of the 400 individuals on the list were in detention centers, with detainees including Senator Ramon Mitra, JRU history teacher Etta Rosales, University of the Philippines College of Social Work professor Flora Lansang, human rights lawyer Haydee Yorac, Manila Times publisher Chino Roces, and a plethora of journalists. Student leaders were arrested regardless of whether their organizations were "radical" or "moderate".

Newspaper editors arrested that night included Amando Doronila of the Daily Mirror, Luis Mauricio of the Philippine Graphic, Teodoro Locsin Sr. of the Philippine Free Press, and Rolando Fadul of the vernacular broadsheet Taliba. Also arrested were reporters Robert Ordoñez of the Philippine Herald, Rosalinda Galang of the Manila Times; columnists Ernesto Granada of the Manila Chronicle and Maximo Soliven of the Manila Times, and Luis Beltran and Ruben Cusipag of the Evening News.

Philippines Free Press associate editor Napoleon Rama and ABS-CBN broadcaster Jose Mari Velez also happened to be delegates to the 1971 Constitutional Convention, and were among the 11 outspoken convention delegates to be arrested. The others included Heherson Alvarez, Alejandro Lichuaco, Voltaire Garcia, and Teofisto Guingona Jr.

=== Media lockdown ===
Marcos reacted with fear of deposition and immediately finalized Proclamation No. 1081, which declared nationwide martial law at 8:00 p.m. later that evening. One day before the proclamation, on September 22, 1972, at 8:00 p.m., Defense Minister Juan Ponce Enrile was told to exit his white Mercedes-Benz sedan near Wack-Wack village. Another vehicle carrying gunmen arrived and stopped near an electrical post, right beside Enrile's vehicle. They then alighted from their vehicle and began to fire at the large sedan of Enrile to give an impression of a terrorist ambush, setting the stage for Marcos's theatrical television announcement.

By the morning of September 23, 1972, martial law forces had successfully implemented a media lockdown, with only outlets associated with Marcos crony Roberto Benedicto allowed to operate. In the afternoon, Benedicto-owned television channel KBS-9 went back on air playing episodes of Hanna-Barbera's Wacky Races cartoon series, which was interrupted at 3:00 PM, when Press Secretary Francisco Tatad went on air to read Proclamation No. 1081, through which Marcos declared martial law. Ferdinand Marcos himself went on air at 7:17 that evening to formalize the announcement. On the following Morning, September 24, the headline of Benedicto's Daily Express announced "FM Declares Martial Law" – the only national newspaper to come out in the immediate aftermath of martial law. (The Mindanao Tribune, which had not received notification of the media lockdown, had been able to put out an edition by the evening of September 23.)

The declaration shut down 7 television stations, 16 national daily newspapers, 11 weekly magazines, 66 community newspapers, and 292 radio stations; as well as public utilities such as Meralco, PLDT, and airlines such as Philippine Airlines (later redesignated in 1973 by Marcos as the flag carrier), Air Manila and Filipinas Orient Airways.

== Impact of martial law on the 1971 Constitutional Convention ==
Marcos's September 1972 proclamation of martial law had major repercussions for the 1971 Constitutional Convention. Marcos arrested the leadership of the "opposition bloc" of the convention, who wanted to make sure that Marcos would not stay in power longer than the two terms allowed him under the 1935 constitution. Eventually, a group of Marcos-supporting delegates led by Gilberto Duavit came up with an entirely new draft of the constitution, which they submitted to Malacañang for ratification only two months after the proclamation of martial law.

=== Arrested delegates and detention of Aquino and Diokno ===
The work of the convention was affected by the declaration of martial law in September 1972 by President Marcos; the military units assigned to implement martial law were given a list of 400 individuals to arrest, consisting mostly of outspoken critics of Ferdinand Marcos's administration. This included a number of members of the Constitutional Convention.

Some of the individuals on the list, such as Raul Manglapus, were not in the Philippines when martial law was declared, while some, such as Raul Roco, were in the country but managed to evade arrest.

However, numerous members of the Constitutional Convention's opposition bloc were among those arrested in the early hours of September 22, 1972. Convention members arrested included Antonio Araneta, Jose Concepcion, Voltaire Garcia, Bren Guiao, Teofisto Guingona Jr., Alejandro Lichuaco, Jose Nolledo, Philippines Free Press associate editor Napoleon Rama, and ABS-CBN broadcaster Jose Mari Velez.

With nearly a dozen of its members in jail and some of its most prominent leaders overseas or in hiding, the "progressive faction" of the convention that spoke against Marcos was no longer able to contribute to the discussion.

Diokno and Aquino, whom the dictatorship considered their foremost opponents, were later handcuffed, blindfolded, and transferred to Fort Magsaysay in Laur, Nueva Ecija in March 1973. They were placed in solitary confinement for 30 days after an article by Aquino published in the Bangkok Post further revealed abuses under martial law. Marcos accused Diokno and Aquino for this article as it was printed while both were in prison at Fort Bonifacio. Aquino and Diokno were kept in solitary in the enclosed and air-sealed Alpha and Delta rooms. Aquino spent his days counting through chalk on the wall, while Diokno counted using the knots of ropes from his mosquito net as well as the back of a soap packaging box and crossed out each day in the manner of a calendar.

They both learned of each other's presence through singing. One of them would frequently sing the national anthem Lupang Hinirang or "Chosen Land", to which the other would reply by singing Bayan Ko or "My Country" to prove he was still alive. Their visiting family members were often strip-searched by soldiers. Diokno's wife Carmen would sneak in books in French and Spanish for him to read. Diokno and his wife talked in Spanish to keep the guards from eavesdropping on their conversation. Diokno would tell his family not to weep in front of the sadistic soldiers. Only his Aunt Paz Wilson, a woman in her 90s and a mother figure since his mother's death, would frequently cry during every visit. She continued to visit despite also undergoing strip searches. The family would be in tears once they left the prison, where the Aquino family would see them. This helped the Aquinos prepare themselves emotionally since they never saw the Diokno family manifest much pain before. Nena Diokno, suspicious of Marcos, took most of her husband's books at the library along Del Pilar Street and brought them home before the military burned down the library. Jose would thank her as he was very familiar with the library and memorized the location of each shelf and book he read. Aquino and Diokno could not keep glasses or pipes, and Diokno needed to request his rosary from time to time. After enduring 30 days they were transferred back to Fort Bonifacio. Diokno was released on September 11, 1974, Marcos's birthday, while Aquino would leave for the United States in 1980.

=== Rushed approval ===
The convention moved quickly after Marcos had declared martial law. The opposition bloc had effectively been decimated and the threat of imprisonment hung over any delegates who might voice opposition in the convention. The regular rules of the convention were suspended and a 166-member group headed by Marcos-supporting Delegate Gilberto Duavit came up with a new draft of the constitution. By November 29, 1972 – a little over two months after the declaration of martial law – the convention approved the draft, which was presented to Marcos in Malacañang Palace on December 1, 1972.

== Rise of the Moro National Liberation Front ==
Sparked by revelations about the 1968 Jabidah massacre, tensions had been rising between the Marcos administration and the Moro peoples of Mindanao. Soon after Jibin Arula told the story of the Massacre story to the press, and Senate investigations suggested the involvement of the president, Lanao del Sur congressman Rashid Lucman called for Marcos's Impeachment. When the bid failed, he eventually founded the Bangsamoro Liberation Organization (BMLO), which initially called for Moro Independence, although it eventually shifted its positions and called for regional autonomy. Former Cotabato governor Datu Udtog Matalam likewise formed of the Muslim Independence Movement (MIM), which also called for Moro Independence. Neither group, however, drew enough followers to form a viable opposition until Marcos declared Martial Law. The BMLO remained small, while the MIM was dissolved when Matalam accepted a government post under Marcos.

With the declaration of Martial Law, on October 21, 1972, political parties, including the BMLO and the MIM, were dissolved. So when former MIM member Nur Misuari formed an armed secessionist group called the Moro National Liberation Front, he was quickly able to consolidate power. The MNLF became the single dominant voice calling for Moro independence, and was able to raise a significant armed force. The Philippines' decades-long Moro conflict had begun in earnest. Alongside Misuari, local leaders such as Batuling Bantayao Gumander took on pivotal roles, serving as the General Chairman of the MNLF's Political Committee until his summary execution by the military in 1976.

== Human rights abuses ==
=== Scale of abuses ===
Marcos's 14 years as dictator is historically remembered for its record of human rights abuses, particularly targeting political opponents, student activists, journalists, religious workers, farmers, and others who fought against the Marcos dictatorship. Based on the documentation of Amnesty International, Task Force Detainees of the Philippines, and similar human rights monitoring entities, historians believe that the Marcos dictatorship was marked by 3,257 known extrajudicial killings, 35,000 documented tortures, 737 enforced disappearances, and 70,000 incarcerations.

Some 2,520 of the 3,257 murder victims were tortured and mutilated before their bodies were dumped in various places for the public to discover – a tactic meant to sow fear among the public, which came to be known as "salvaging". Some bodies were even cannibalized.

=== International pressure, and knowledge of abuses by Marcos ===
The international community eventually got word of these human rights violations and applied pressure to the Marcos administration to end them. In 1975, Marcos aide and chief propagandist Primitivo Mijares defected from the Marcos administration and revealed in front of US lawmakers that torture was routinely practiced within the Marcos regime. Mijares' admission attracted international criticism, particularly from Amnesty International and Washington. Amnesty International's first report about the Philippines in December 1975 revealed the "systematic and severe torture" handled by the Fifth Constabulary Security Unit (5CSU). Amnesty International found convincing evidence of widespread torture among prisoners, enabled by Marcos's suspension of the writ of habeas corpus and the absence of judicial oversight. Evidence reveals that not only was he aware of tortures and murders enacted by his military and police force, but that he condoned and at times arranged for it. This caused tensions between the United States and the Philippines, pressuring Marcos to admit human rights violations during his regime.

Marcos initially denied knowledge of human rights violations. In 1974, he proclaimed in a televised address that "No one, but no one was tortured". But he eventually confessed at the 1977 World Peace through law Conference in Manila that "there have been, to our lasting regret, a number of violations of the rights of detainees".

== Economy ==
Philippine economic history from Marcos's declaration of martial law to his ouster through the 1986 People Power Revolution was a period of significant economic highs and lows.

The September 1972 declaration of martial law coincided with an increased global demand for raw materials, including coconut and sugar, and the increase in global market prices for these commodities. This "commodities boom" allowed GDP growth to peak at nearly 9 percent in the years immediately after the declaration – in 1973 and 1976. The Philippine's Gross Domestic Product quadrupled from $8 billion in 1972 to $32.45 billion in 1980, for an inflation-adjusted average growth rate of 6% per year.

The commodities boom continued throughout most of the 1970s, only slowing down towards the early 1980s when it left the Philippine economy vulnerable to the instability of the international capital market. As a result, the economy grew amidst the two severe global oil shocks following the 1973 oil crisis and 1979 energy crisis – oil price was $3 / barrel in 1973 and $39.5 in 1979, or a growth of 1200% which drove inflation.

The Heritage Foundation pointed that when the economy began to weaken in 1979, the government did not adopt anti-recessionist policies and instead launched risky and costly industrial projects. The overall economy experienced a slower growth GDP per capita, lower wage conditions and higher unemployment especially towards the end of Marcos's term after the 1983–1984 recession. The Philippine peso devalued sharply from 3.9 to 20.53. The recession was triggered largely by political instability following Ninoy's assassination, high global interest rates, severe global economic recession, and significant increase in global oil price, the latter three of which affected all indebted countries in Latin America, Europe, and Asia. The Philippines was among these countries and was not exempted from the negative economic consequences.

Despite the 1984–1985 recession, GDP on a per capita basis more than tripled from $175.9 in 1965 to $565.8 in 1985 at the end of Marcos's term, though this averages less than 1.2% a year when adjusted for inflation.

The period is sometimes erroneously described as a golden age for the country's economy. However, by the period's end, the country was experiencing a debt crisis, extreme poverty, and severe underemployment. On the island of Negros, one-fifth of the children under six were seriously malnourished.

=== Rise in poverty incidence ===
The Marcos regime did not provide a clear operational definition of "poverty" during its time in power, so its regularly released short-term statistics instead focused mostly just on the consumer price index every month. In the long term, however, absolute poverty incidence grew from 41% in the 1960s at the time Marcos took the presidency to 59% when he was removed from power.

The World Bank estimated that in the cities alone, the "proportion of people living below the poverty line" grew "from 24 percent in 1974 to 40 percent in 1986".

The drastic downturn in GNP per capita and of poverty more broadly was the reason opposition figure Ninoy Aquino decided to risk returning to the Philippines in 1983, hoping that he could discuss it with Marcos, even briefly. However, he was assassinated before he could deplane upon his arrival in the Philippines - an incident which, along with broad dissatisfaction with economic conditions, helped trigger the 1986 People Power revolution three years later.

The Philippines' economic nosedive from 1983 to 1985 led to a drastic reduction in Per capita GDP, which did not return to the same levels until two decades later in 2003 - what economists refers to as the Philippines' "two lost decades of development."

=== Rise in debt ===
The Philippines had a cautious borrowing policy as late as the early 1970s, but the Marcos administration borrowed a massive amount of foreign debt in the early 1980s amid high oil prices, high interest rates, capital flight, and falling export prices of sugar and coconut. The country's total external debt rose from US$2.3 billion in 1970 to US$26.2 billion in 1985. Along with corruption and plunder of public funds by Marcos and his cronies, this held the country under a debt-servicing crisis which is expected to be fixed by only 2025.

== Suppression of journalism ==
The shutdown of media and the mass arrests of publishers and journalists on the eve of the 1972 Martial Law declaration effectively silenced the Philippine culture of press freedom for several years. It also had a chilling effect on news coverage all the way until Marcos was deposed and exiled in 1986, despite the Marcos administration loosening press restrictions in light of international pressure, and despite the technical lifting of Martial Law in 1981.

The few publications who dared to criticize Marcos, such as the WE Forum and Ang Pahayagang Malaya, came to collectively be referred to "the mosquito press," since they became a minor but persistent irritation to the dictatorship.

Key turning points in the history of Philippine journalism during this time included: the establishment of WE Forum in 1977 and of Ang Pahayagang Malaya in 1981; the landmark coverage the murder of Macli-ing Dulag, a leader of indigenous opposition to the Chico River Dam Project; the 1982 expose of Ferdinand Marcos's fake military medals which led to the closure of WE Forum and the jailing of its prominent columnists; and the 1984 murder of leading Mindanao journalist Alex Orcullo in Davao City.

== Proclamation No. 2045 ==
On January 17, 1981, Marcos issued Proclamation No. 2045, which formally lifted the proclamation of martial law, but retained many of his powers. The lifting was timed to coincide with Pope John Paul II's visit to the Philippines and with the inauguration of new U.S. president and Marcos ally Ronald Reagan. Reacting to the announcement, former president Diosdado Macapagal, who at the time was the leading member of the United Nationalist Democratic Organization, said that the lifting of martial law after eight years was "in name only, but not in fact". Marcos reacted to criticism by telling the national assembly, "The opposition members want only to save their individual skins against national interests."

Amendment No. 6 to the new 1973 constitution allowed him to continue making laws, and the decrees issued during martial law were carried forward after the lifting of Proclamation No. 1081. He also retained the right to suspend the writ of habeas corpus for "crimes related to subversion, insurrection, rebellion, and also conspiracy to commit such crimes."

Human rights abuses continued.

== 1986 People Power Revolution and exile of the Marcos family ==
Increasing unrest springing from the economic collapse of the Philippines in the years after the assassination of Senator Benigno Aquino in 1983 came to a head in February 1986, when the EDSA People Power Revolution succeeded in unseating the Marcoses from Malacañang Palace.

Fearful of a scenario in which Marcos's presence in the Philippines would lead to a civil war, the Reagan administration flew Marcos and a party of about 80 individuals – the extended Marcos family and a number of close associates – from the Philippines to Hawaii despite Marcos's objections.

The exiles stayed at Hickam Air Force Base at the expense of the US government. A month later, they moved into a pair of residences in Makiki Heights, Honolulu, which were registered to Marcos cronies Antonio Floirendo, and Bienvenido and Gliceria Tantoco.

Marcos would eventually die in exile in 1989.

President Corazon Aquino eventually allowed the remaining members of the Marcos family to return to the Philippines to face various charges. News reports from the period record that Marcos supporters organized crowd from Manila's slums to welcome the Marcoses on their return.

== See also ==
- Martial law in the Philippines
- History of the Philippines (1965–1986)
  - Economic history of the Philippines (1965–1986)
- Proclamation No. 1081
- 1972 Manila bombings
