= Muslim Independence Movement =

Secessionist organization in the Philippines

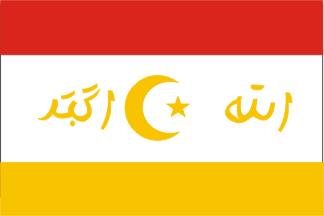
- Flag (1968–1969)
- Abbreviation: MIM
- Founded: 1 May 1968
- Dissolved: 1972
- Location: Philippines
- Method: Secessionist political organization
- Key people: Datu Udtog Matalam

The Muslim Independence Movement (MIM) was a secessionist political organization in the Philippines.

On 1 May 1968, two months after the Jabidah massacre, Datu Udtog Matalam, a former governor of Cotabato, issued a Manifesto for the declaration of the Muslim Independent Movement that sought for an independent Muslim state from the Philippines comprising Mindanao, Sulu, and Palawan regions. The organization was later renamed as the Mindanao Independence Movement (still MIM) to assure non-Muslims in Cotabato that they are included in the envisioned state.

Although the MIM was not long-lasting, its impacts were far-reaching as it is argued to be the key factor that led to the formation of the Moro National Liberation Front (MNLF).

== Background ==
=== Internal colonization ===
Mindanao, with its favorable location below the typhoon belt and its rich mineral resources, naturally attracted foreign capital to the area. This prompted then President Ramon Magsaysay since the mid-1950s and subsequently President Ferdinand Marcos (1966–1986) to systematically resettle people into Mindanao. This led to the proportion of indigenous peoples in Mindanao to shrink from majority in 1913 to minority by 1976. The best lands in Mindanao were given to settlers and owners of corporate agriculture, while most development investments and government services were offered to the Christian population. This caused the Muslim population to be backward and rank among the poorest in their own country. The resettlement programme was not entirely peaceful as some settlers managed to obtain land from the native Muslims through harassment and other violent efforts which drove the Muslims out of their own lands.

The Muslims were alienated by the Philippines government and felt threatened by Christian economic and political domination in their own homeland. This resorted in some Muslim groups to turn to extortion and violence to protect their own land and refrain from being displaced. Such efforts of “integration” had led to the crystallisation of the Moro identity as the Muslims’ identity with the Filipino nation declined rapidly due to the threat in economic and social Muslim life.

As an effect of the resettlement, Muslim noble rulers or mga datò were also voted out during the polls as Christians, who made up a significant majority of the voters, preferred the Christian politicians over them. These mga datò suffered a loss in prestige as they could no longer control the Muslim lands. These politicians lost much of the capabilities they had possessed initially to manage the Muslim populace.

=== Jabidah Massacre ===
The massacre took place in March 1968 which took the lives of Muslim army recruits and subsequently awakened the Muslim intellectuals to realise the problem besetting the Muslims in Philippines. The occurrence of the Jabidah massacre was timely in that it provided the basis for the call of Muslim solidarity in the Philippines to fight against the government's negligence in the plight of the Muslims. The massacre was regarded to have provided the impetus for the declaration of the MIM which is considered one of the triggers of the Moro armed struggle in the long-run.

=== Datu Udtog Matalam ===
During the 1950s and most of 1960s, prior to the resettlement of the Christians into Cotabato, Datu Udtog Matalam governed Cotabato unchallenged. He was revered as a religious leader and was also an anti-Japanese guerrilla hero during the World War II. He was voted as the governor of the province for 5 times and had kept Cotabato out of trouble created by others.

Leveraging on the dissatisfaction of the Muslims fired by the Jabidah Massacre and their disadvantaged plight under the Marcos government, former governor of Cotabato province, Matalam, initiated an open movement for secession of the Muslim state through the formation of the MIM.

Although some scholars observed that the MIM was formed because Muslim political leaders felt that the government was not doing enough for the Muslims, others have argued that the declaration of the MIM was made to regain political power and not to address the plight of Muslims in Philippines. Matalam was betrayed by his own brother-in-law, Congressman Salipada Pendatun, and was allegedly forced to retire from office by national party politics, and was therefore motivated to regain political power through the declaration of the MIM.

Separately, other scholars suggested that it was more personal than political for Matalam to declare the MIM, proposing that the killing of his son by a National Bureau of Investigation (NBI) agent intensified his resentment toward the Philippines government. Despite sending emissaries to Manila seeking justice, the officers involved in the killing were not convicted. Coupled with the dissent of being thrown out of power by the Christian settlers, Matalam felt that the Manila government was turning its back on him which spurred him to retaliate by declaring for an independent Muslim state.

Another group of scholars analysed that the declaration of the MIM was a façade by the Muslims leaders to show their concern after failing to improve living standards of the Muslims. Prior to the Jabidah massacre and against the backdrop of economic repression in Mindanao, local datus allegedly did not show concern for the plight of the Muslim natives but were more concerned over their own statuses. Underlying such pretext by the Muslim leaders, the formation of the MIM was regarded as an avenue for leaders like Matalam to gain recognition for his leadership which he would otherwise not be able to achieve. His efforts paid off when Marcos appointed him as Presidential Adviser on Muslim Affairs. Matalam allegedly used the outrage of Muslims due to the Jabidah episode to gain personal ends.

== The movement ==
=== Manifesto, constitution and by-laws and a note to the President ===
In the first document issued by Matalam on 1 May 1968 which he termed as the Manifesto, he sought to establish an Islamic state, which would be known as ‘The Republic of Mindanao and Sulu’, that embodies the Islamic ideals and heritage and is therefore independent from the Philippines. The Islamic state shall comprise the southern part of the Philippine Archipelago inhabited by the Muslims, namely Cotabato, Davao, Zamboanga and Zamboanga City, Basilan City, Lanao, Sulu, Palawan, and other adjoining areas that are inhabited by Muslims. The MIM states that the 4 million population of Muslims possess their own culture and history that are distinct from the majority Christians in Philippines which makes integration impossible. The manifesto also stated that the secession request a response to "the systematic extermination of the Muslim youth - like the Corregidor Fiasco" (the Jabidah massacre) and “the policy of isolation and dispersal of the Muslim communities” that have been pursued vigorously much to the detriment of the Muslim community. In the addendums and subsequent documents issued from 8 June 1968 to 26 July 1968, Matalam, as the principal signatory of all these documents, further clarified that the organization is to be known as the Muslim Independence Movement and be referred to as MIM. Membership for the movement is only open to able-bodied Muslims within the Philippines and application can be done through the secretariat. In one of the documents, Matalam added that Muslims would need its own defined territory to abide by their own shariah (Muslim laws) and adat (practices). He added that the Muslims are ready to self-govern with sufficient trained men in all fields. Matalam regarded the MIM as the "concerted voice, organized solely as an instrument for the realisation of their (the Muslims’) cherished dreams and aspirations."

=== Amended policy ===
On 26 August 1968, Matalam issued a Declaration of Policy stating that the independent Islamic state shall “extend and guarantee full and equal citizenship and fair representation in all its institutions, provisional or permanent, on all non-Muslims inhabitants of the said islands who make known their desires to secede from the Republic of the Philippines and join the new Islamic state”. Within three months of the issuance of the manifesto, Matalam had changed the policy to provide equal rights to Christian inhabitants and subsequently, further mellowed his demand and only sought for a statehood under a federal system. He changed the name of the MIM to Mindanao Independence Movement in an effort to reassure Christian settlers that they are not excluded from the movement and would be accorded equal rights as the Muslims.

=== End of movement ===
Just after 5 months of declaring the MIM Manifesto and demanding for an independent state from the Philippines, Matalam changed his position. On 11 October 1968, he met President Ferdinand Marcos, who appointed Matalam as his adviser on Muslim Affairs. In a statement issued by the MIM secretariat, Matalam reasoned that he "accepted the position as a gesture of sportsmanship on his part as the leader of the more than four million Muslims in the Philippines". This suggests that the Jabidah Massacre was less an impetus as compared to his own personal drivers to declare the formation of the MIM.

Albeit riding on the wave of Muslim dissent against the government, the MIM failed to garner support of the Muslim masses. The Muslims did not see how the MIM could be a tool to help them achieve betterment of their lives considering that the leaders of the movement were the exact leaders who did not care for their plight prior the Jabidah Massacre. According to the statistics of a census, Alpha Report, conducted by the Manila-based Filipinas Foundation, the results of the survey showed that more than half interviewed opposed the secession idea and about another quarter were uncommitted which effectively meant that the MIM only had the support of a quarter of the some 4 million Muslims in the region. The MIM never managed to become a popular movement as it was limited to only publications of documents and communiques that were released by the press.

The MIM was disintegrated in 1972 with the surrender of Matalam in December with many of its members consequentially and subsequently rallying the MNLF.

== Impact ==
=== Increase in armed conflicts ===
The declaration of the MIM provided opportunity for the blossom of armed gangs who received political respectability in their fight towards an independent Islamic state. The MIM also provoked thoughts of self-discovery among the Muslims to oppose the ruling government and this provocation has led to subsequent violent encounters.

In March 1970, a gun battle in Upi, Cotabato, exposed the existence of Ilagas (rats) who were trained and systematic in attacking Muslims and were backed by Christian mayors to ensure that political power is kept by Christians in the wake of the upcoming 1971 elections. Other scholars have argued that the anti-Moro Ilaga Movement was actually in response to the declaration of the MIM as the Christians were "frightened". In response to the attacks by the Ilagas, the Blackshirts and Barracudas (the private army of Ali Dimaporo, a Muslim congressman of the Nationalista party) were formed and trained to engage in gang warfare against the Ilagas. The Blackshirts were allegedly backed financially by Matalam to mobilize fighting squads to launch attacks against Christians but this claim cannot be proven. During this period, one notable incident would be the Manili massacre in June 1971 which claimed the lives of Muslims in a mosque in Manili when unarmed Muslims were shot by government officials and Christian civilians.

Significantly, the MIM produced a boom of gunmen who may not be politically driven but rather content with only robbery and plundering.

=== International pressure ===
Matalam went to Kuala Lumpur in April 1969 to meet the delegations of the Conference of Muslim States to appeal for assistance to support his cause but it was Rashid Lucman of the MIM who provided the critical link to external sponsors such as Malaysia where Tun Mustapha, then Chief Minister of Sabah, and then Prime Minister Tun Abdul Razak who were angered by Operation Merdeka sponsored the training of 90 Muslim youths in Pulau Pangkor in 1969. Nur Misuari, one of the prominent people of the Moro National Liberation Front (MNLF), had met with Matalam and Salipada Pendatun to organize the training camp on the island of Pangkor.

After the Manili massacre, Libya presented the matter before the UN Subcommittee for Human Rights in August 1971. President Muammar Gaddafi accused the Manila government of genocide and persecution of Muslim minorities in the Philippines and was determined to provide material aid to the Muslims in Philippines, and this was also supported by other Arab countries. The sectarian violence between the Ilagas and Barracudas had turned into a religious conflict as Muslim governments (Egypt, Algeria, Morocco, and Libya) promised to send aid to the Muslims in Philippines.

The pressure from the Muslim countries was partially used to justify Marcos's declaration of martial law to retrieve unauthorized weapons and ban all political organizations to control the Muslims in the south.

=== Continuation of the Moro armed struggle ===
The MIM was argued to be the precursor of the MNLF. In response to the sectarian violence, Nur Misuari convened a conference to discuss the situation of the Muslims in south. This conference was attended by the trainees of the camp on Pangkor Island and also members of the youth wing of the MIM. The most important and significant result of this conference was the official formation of the MNLF. As the MIM was “abandoned” by its leaders who were offered high positions in the government, young passionate followers such as Nur Misuari saw that they had to continue the battle and went on to form the MNLF. Based on an interview with a Bangsa Moro Commander conducted by Frank Gould, the MNLF reportedly arose as an underground movement in the youth section of the MIM. These young followers also saw the MIM as being small and ineffective therefore created a more radical MNLF, which had longer-lasting and more significant effects in Philippines till today.
