= 1972 Manila bombings =

Series of bombings in Metro Manila

- Location: Various locations in the Greater Manila Area, Philippines
- Date: March 15, 1972 to September 11, 1972 (UTC +8)
- Attack type: Bombings
- Deaths: 1
- Injuries: 40

The 1972 Manila bombings were a series of "about twenty explosions in Metro Manila in the months after the Plaza Miranda bombing and immediately preceding Ferdinand Marcos' proclamation of Martial Law". The first occurred on March 15, 1972, and the last took place on September 11, 1972 - twelve days before martial law was announced on September 23.

The Marcos administration officially attributed the explosions to communist "urban guerillas", and Marcos included them in the list of "inciting events" that served as rationalizations for martial law. Marcos' political opposition questioned the attribution of the explosions to the communists, noting that the only suspects caught in connection to the explosions were linked to the Philippine Constabulary.

Bombing sites included the Palace Theater and Joe's Department Store on Carriedo Street, both in Manila; the offices of the Philippine Long Distance Telephone Company (PLDT), Filipinas Orient Airways, and Philippine American Life and General Insurance Company (PhilamLife); the Cubao branch of the Philippine Trust Company (now known as PhilTrust Bank); the Senate Publication Division and the Philippine Sugar Institute in Quezon City, and the South Vietnamese embassy. The incident in the Carriedo shopping mall killed one woman and injured about 40, the only incident involving casualties.

== Explosion incidents ==
The sites of the bombings included the Palace Theater and Joe's Department Store on Carriedo Street, both in the City of Manila; the offices of the Philippine Long Distance Telephone Company (PLDT), Filipinas Orient Airways, and Philippine American Life and General Insurance Company (PhilamLife); the Cubao branch of the Philippine Trust Company (now known as PhilTrust Bank); the Senate Publication Division and the Philippine Sugar Institute in Quezon City, and the South Vietnamese embassy.

However, only one of these incidents - the one in the Carriedo shopping mall - went beyond damage to property; one woman was killed and about 40 persons were injured.

1972 bombings cited in Proclamation № 1081
Date	Place
March 15	Arca Building on Taft Avenue, Pasay
April 23	Filipinas Orient Airways boardroom along Domestic Road, Pasay
May 30	Vietnamese Embassy
June 23	Court of Industrial Relations
June 24	Philippine Trust Company branch in Cubao, Quezon City
July 3	Philam Life building along United Nations Avenue, Manila
July 27	Tabacalera Cigar & Cigarette Factory compound at Marquez de Comilas, Manila
August 15	PLDT exchange office on East Avenue, Quezon City,
August 15	Philippine Sugar Institute building on North Avenue, Diliman, Quezon City
August 17	Department of Social Welfare building at San Rafael Street, Sampaloc, Manila
August 19	A water main on Aurora Boulevard and Madison Avenue, Quezon City
August 30	Philam Life building and nearby Far East Bank and Trust Company building
August 30	Building of the Philippine Banking Corporation as well as the buildings of the Investment Development Inc, and the Daily Star Publications when another explosion took place on Railroad Street, Port Area, Manila
September 5	Joe's Department Store on Carriedo Street, Quiapo, Manila
September 8	Manila City Hall
September 12	Water mains in San Juan
September 14	San Miguel building in Makati
September 18	Quezon City Hall, venue of the 1971 Philippine Constitutional Convention

== Suspects ==
=== Communist guerillas ===
The Marcos regime officially attributed the explosions communist "urban guerillas", referring to the earliest recruits of the Communist Party of the Philippines, which had split from the Partido Komunista ng Pilipinas about five years before.

=== Government agents ===
Opposition senator Ninoy Aquino noted with suspicion that with the Carriedo incident as the only exception, "the bombings had all been timed for maximum publicity and nothing more." He also noted that "one of the two arrested bombing suspects was a PC (Philippine Constabulary, now the Philippine National Police) sergeant who was employed at the Firearms and Explosive Section of the PC."

== See also ==
- Martial Law under Ferdinand Marcos
- Proclamation 1081
