= Militia =

Force of non-professional soldiers

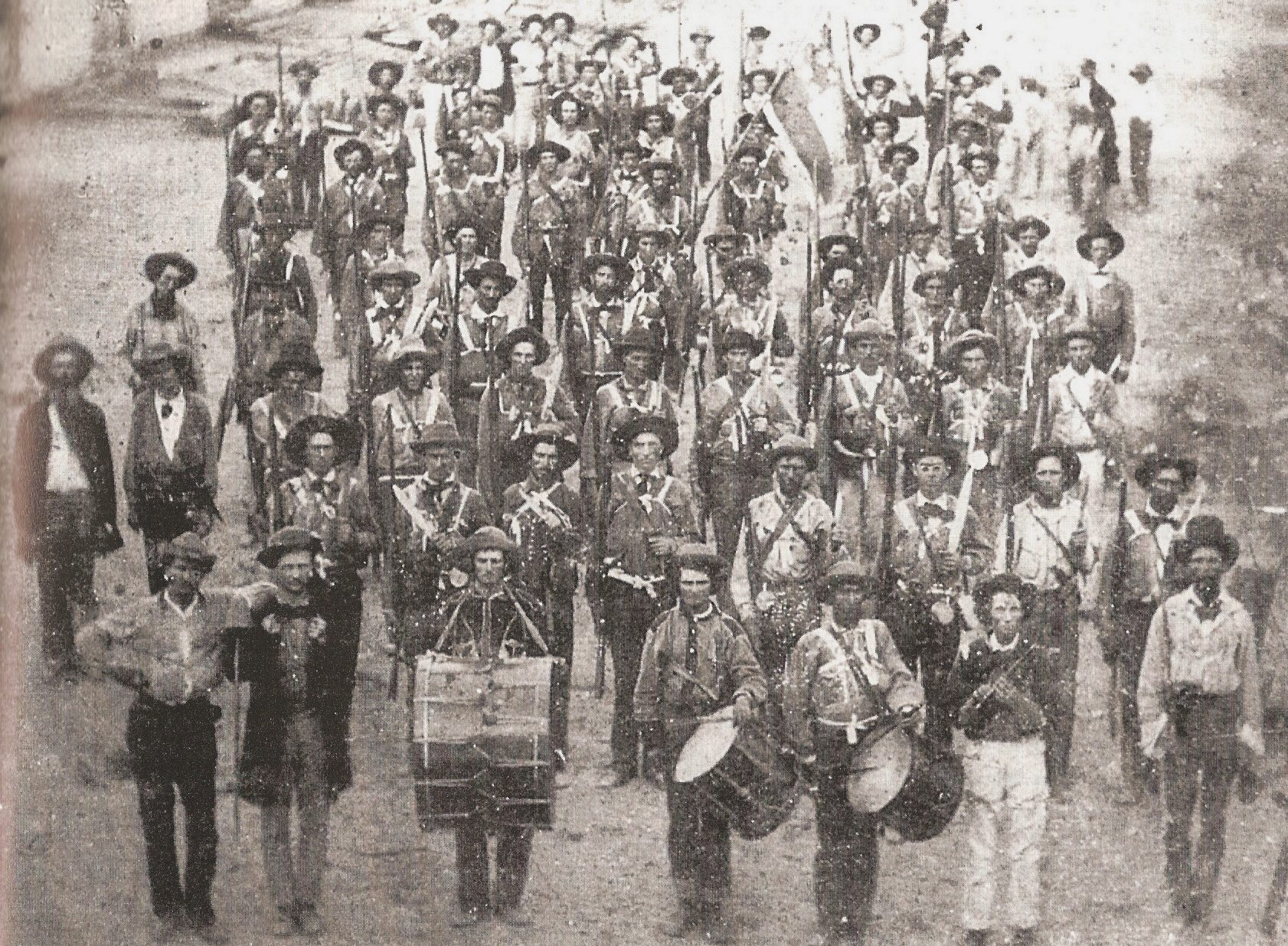
Confederate militiamen at Arkadelphia, Arkansas, 1861

A militia (/mɪˈlɪʃə/ mil-ISH-ə) is a military or paramilitary force that comprises civilian members, as opposed to a professional standing army of regular, full-time military personnel. Militias may be raised in times of need to support regular troops or serve as a pool of available manpower for regular forces to draw from.

When acting independently, militias are generally unable to hold ground against regular forces. Militias commonly support regular troops by skirmishing, holding fortifications, or conducting irregular warfare, instead of undertaking offensive campaigns by themselves. However, militias may also engage in defense activities to protect a community, its territory, property, and laws. For example, naval militias may comprise fishermen and other civilians which are organized and sanctioned by a state to enforce its maritime boundaries.

Beginning in the late 20th century, some militias (in particular officially recognized and sanctioned militias of a government) act as professional forces, while still being part-time or on-call organizations. For instance, members of the part-time United States National Guard militia are considered professional soldiers, as they are trained to the same standards that their full-time, active duty counterparts are. Militias may nonetheless operate outside of a state's legal jurisdiction, taking the form of a private military force, irregular military, or guerilla forces.

In countries with conscription, the term "militia" may refer to the entire able-bodied population available, legally obliged, or who actually respond to be called to arms. In Russia and some countries of the former Soviet Union, an official reserve army composed of citizen soldiers is known as the militsiya.

== Etymology ==
Militia derives from Latin roots:

- miles /miːles/ : soldier
- -itia /iːtia/ : a state, activity, quality or condition of being
- militia /milːiːtia/: Military service

The word militia dates back to ancient Rome, and more recently to at least 1590 when it was recorded in a book by Sir John Smythe, Certain Discourses Military with the meanings: a military force; a body of soldiers and military affairs; a body of military discipline The word Militia comes from ancient Latin, in which it meant defense service, as distinguished from a body of (armed) defenders which would be volgus militum. The term is used by several countries with the meaning of "defense activity" indicating it is taken directly from Latin.

== By country ==
=== Afghanistan ===
Militias have been used throughout the history of Afghanistan. Afghan Militias and irregular forces have contributed significantly to the military history of the country and affected the process of state formation.

=== Andorra ===
Andorra has a small army, which has historically been raised or reconstituted at various dates, but has never in modern times amounted to a standing army. The basic principle of Andorran defence is that all able-bodied men are available to fight if called upon by the sounding of the Sometent. Being a landlocked country, Andorra has no navy.

Before World War I, Andorra maintained an armed militia force of about 600 part-time militiamen under the supervision of a Captain (Capità or Cap de Sometent) and a Lieutenant (Desener or Lloctinent del Capità). This body was not liable for service outside the principality and was commanded by two officials (veguers) appointed by France and the Bishop of Urgell.

In the modern era, the army has consisted of a very small body of volunteers willing to undertake ceremonial duties. Uniforms and weaponry were handed down from generation to generation within families and communities.

The army's role in internal security was largely taken over by the formation of the Police Corps of Andorra in 1931. Brief civil disorder associated with the elections of 1933 led to assistance being sought from the French National Gendarmerie, with a detachment resident in Andorra for two months under the command of René-Jules Baulard. The Andorran Police was reformed in the following year, with eleven soldiers appointed to supervisory roles. The force consisted of six Corporals, one for each parish (although there are currently seven parishes, there were only six until 1978), plus four junior staff officers to co-ordinate action, and a commander with the rank of major. It was the responsibility of the six corporals, each in his own parish, to be able to raise a fighting force from among the able-bodied men of the parish.

Today a small, twelve-man ceremonial unit remains the only permanent section of the Sometent, but all able-bodied men remain technically available for military service, with a requirement for each family to have access to a firearm. An area weapon such as a Shotgun per household is unregulated, however ranged weapons such as Pistols and Rifles require a license. The army has not fought for more than 700 years, and its main responsibility is to present the flag of Andorra at official ceremonial functions. According to Marc Forné Molné, Andorra's military budget is strictly from voluntary donations, and the availability of full-time volunteers.

In more recent times there has only been a general emergency call to the popular army of Sometent during the floods of 1982 in the Catalan Pyrenees, where 12 citizens perished in Andorra, to help the population and establish a public order along with the Local Police units.

=== Argentina ===
In the early 1800s Buenos Aires, which was by then the capital of the Viceroyalty of the Río de la Plata, was attacked during the British invasions of the Río de la Plata. As regular military forces were insufficient to counter the British attackers, Santiago de Liniers drafted all males in the city capable of bearing arms into the military. These recruits included the criollo peoples, who ranked low down in the social hierarchy, as well as some slaves. With these reinforcements, the British armies were twice defeated. The militias became a strong factor in the politics of the city afterwards, as a springboard from which the criollos could manifest their political ambitions. They were a key element in the success of the May Revolution, which deposed the Spanish viceroy and began the Argentine War of Independence. A decree by Mariano Moreno derogated the system of promotions involving criollos, allowing instead their promotion on military merit.

The Argentine Civil War was waged by militias again, as both federalists and unitarians drafted common people into their ranks as part of ongoing conflicts. These irregular armies were organized at a provincial level, and assembled as leagues depending on political pacts. This system had declined by the 1870s, mainly due to the establishment of the modern Argentine Army, drafted for the Paraguayan War by President Bartolomé Mitre. Provincial militias were outlawed and decimated by the new army throughout the presidential terms of Mitre, Sarmiento, Avellaneda and Roca.

=== Armenia ===
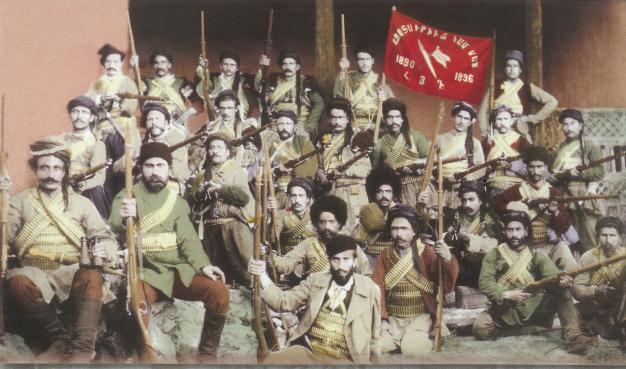
Armenian fedayi were Armenian irregular militia formed in the late 19th and early 20th century to defend Armenian villages.

Armenian militia, or fedayi played a major role in the independence of various Armenian states, including Western Armenia, the First Republic of Armenia, and the Republic of Artsakh. Armenian militia also played a role in the Georgia-Abkhazia War of 1992–1993.

=== Australia ===
In the Colony of New South Wales, Governor Lachlan Macquarie proposed a colonial militia but the idea was rejected. Governor Ralph Darling felt a mounted police force was more efficient than a militia. A military volunteer movement attracted wide interest during the Crimean War. Following Federation, the various military reserve forces of the Commonwealth of Australia became the Citizen Military Force (CMF).

A citizens' militia modeled on the British Home Guard called the Volunteer Defence Corps (VDC) was founded by the Returned and Services League of Australia (RSL) in 1940 in response to the possibility of a Japanese invasion of Australia. In the beginning, members didn't have uniforms and often paraded in business attire. They were given instruction on guerrilla warfare, and later the private organization was taken over by the Australian Government and became part of the Australian Military Forces (AMF). The government supported the organization and equipped them with anti-aircraft artillery; however, they were disbanded by the end of World War II due to the fact that there was no longer a significant threat to national security.

=== Austria ===
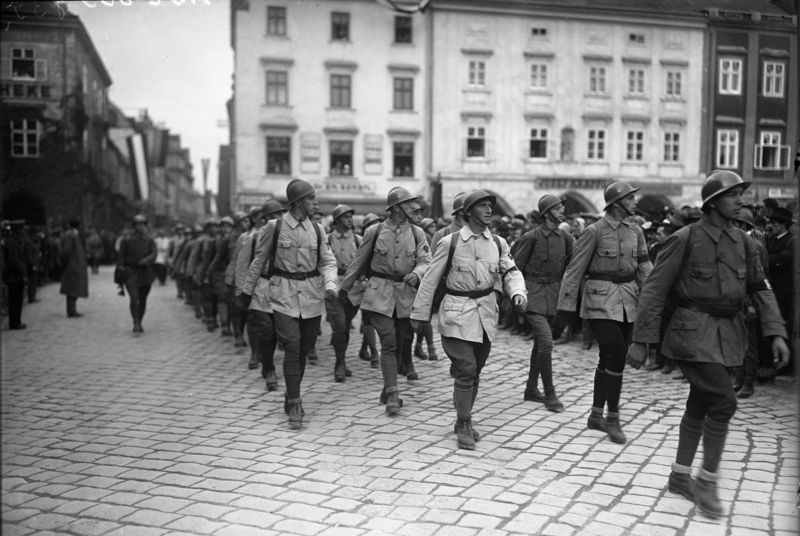
Republikanischer Schutzbund was an Austrian militia formed in 1923, one of several militias formed in post-World War I Austria.

During the Revolutions of 1848 in the Austrian Empire, a National Guard was established in Vienna. A separate but related Academic Legion was composed mainly of students in the capital city.

After World War I, multiple militias formed as soldiers returned home to their villages, only to find many of them occupied by Slovene and Yugoslav forces. Especially in the southern province of Carinthia the Volkswehr (Peoples Defense Force) was formed, to fight the occupant forces.

During the First Republic, similar to the development in Germany, increasing radicalization of politics led to certain paramilitary militias associating with certain political parties. The Heimwehr (German: Home Defense) became affiliated with the Christian Social Party and the Republikanischer Schutzbund (German: Republican Defense League) became affiliated with the Social Democratic Workers' Party of Austria. Violence increasingly escalated, breaking out during the July Revolt of 1927 and finally the Austrian Civil War, when the Schutzbund was defeated by the Heimwehr, police, Gendarmerie and Austrian Armed Forces.

After World War II the Austrian Armed Forces (Bundesheer) were reestablished as a conscript military force. A basic part of it is the militia, which is a regular reservists force of the Bundesheer, comparable to the national guard units of the United States. The conscript soldiers of the militia have to store their military equipment at home, to be mobilized quite fast within a few days in case of emergency. The system was established during the Cold War and still exists, but the members of the militia now are volunteers only.

=== Bahrain ===
In Bahrain, emergence of a small militia group Katibat al Haydariyah was first seen in 2015. During the year, total four attacks were claimed by the group, including on August 22 and 24, 2015, in Muharraq, on September 10, 2015, in Al Khamis, and on October 9, 2015, on Bahraini forces in the Al Juffair region. Katibat al Haydariyah is its own distinct organization that decries the Bahraini government, but Canada and the United Kingdom listed it as an alias for the larger Al-Ashtar Brigades (or the Saraya al Ashtar). After four years, the militia group reemerged on social media in October 2019, to threaten new attacks on the island. It stated that they "will not retreat from our goals of the downfall of the Al Khalifa entity," and that "soon, guns will open their mouths and they will hear the whiz of bullets".

=== Belgium ===
The Garde Civique or Burgerwacht (French and Dutch; "Civic Guard") was a Belgian paramilitary militia which existed between 1830 and 1920. Created in October 1830 shortly after the Belgian Revolution, the Guard amalgamated the various militia groups which had been created by the middle classes to protect property during the political uncertainty. Its role was as a quasi-military "gendarmerie", with the primary role of maintaining social order within Belgium. Increasingly anachronistic, it was demobilised in 1914 and officially disbanded in 1920, following a disappointing performance during the German invasion of Belgium in World War I.

=== Brazil ===
In Brazil, the word milícia is heavily associated with paramilitary and drug-related criminal groups.

=== Canada ===
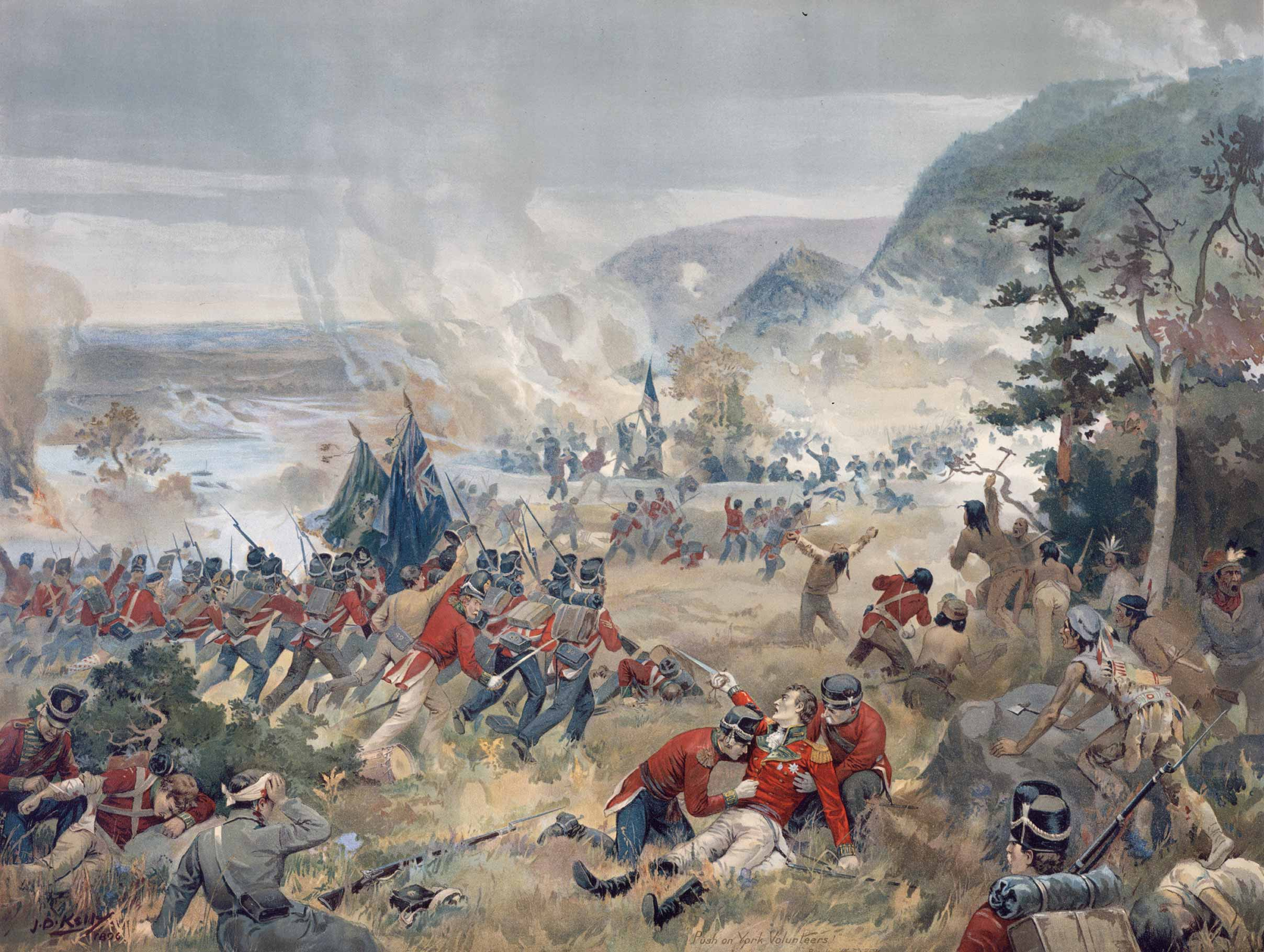
The 2nd Regiment of York Militia at the Battle of Queenston Heights

In Canada the title "Militia" historically referred to the land component of the armed forces, both regular (full-time) and reserve. The earliest Canadian militias date from the beginning of the French colonial period. In New France, King Louis XIV created a compulsory militia of settlers in every parish that supported French authorities in the defence and expansion of the colony.

Following the British conquest of New France in 1760, local militia units supported British Army regiments stationed in British America, and, after the secession of thirteen continental colonies in the American War of Independence, British North America. In addition to the Canadian militia, British regiments were also supported by locally raised regulars (including the 40th Regiment of Foot, and the 100th (Prince of Wales's Royal Canadian) Regiment of Foot) and Fencibles regiments. These regiments were raised through ordinary modes of recruiting, as opposed to being raised by ballot like the militia. Most militia units were only activated in time of war, but remained inactive in between. The battle honours awarded to these colonial militia regiments are perpetuated by modern regiments within the Canadian Army.

Defence of the Canadas long relied on a contingent of British soldiers, as well as support from the Royal Navy. However, the Crimean War saw the diversion of a significant number of British soldiers from British North America. Fearing possible incursions from the United States, the Parliament of the Province of Canada passed the Militia Act of 1855, creating the Active Militia. The Active Militia, later splitting into the Permanent Active Militia (PAM), a full-time professional army component (although it continued to use the label militia), and Non-Permanent Active Militia (NPAM), a military reserve force for the Canadian militia. Following 1855, the traditional sedentary militia was reorganized into the Reserve Militia, with its last enrolment taking place in 1873, and was formally abolished in 1950.

Prior to Canadian Confederation, the colonies that made up the Maritimes, and Newfoundland maintained their own militias independent of the Canadian Militia. Bermuda, part of British North America and militarily subordinate to the Commander-in-Chief of the Maritimes, allowed its militia to lapse following the American War of 1812. United States Independence, however, elevated Bermuda to the status of an Imperial fortress and it would be strongly defended by the regular army, and left out of the confederation of Canada. From 1853 to 1871, the Colony of Vancouver Island (and the succeeding Colony of British Columbia) periodically raised and disbanded militia units. These units were raised for specific purposes, or in response to a specific threat, real or perceived.

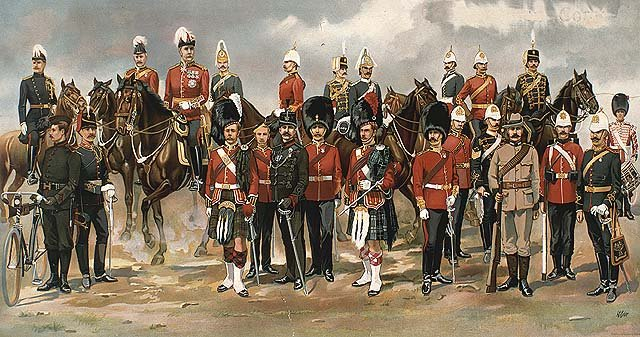
Uniforms of the Canadian Militia in 1898. The force included the Permanent Active Militia, a full-time professional land force which became the Canadian Army in 1940.

After the Treaty of Washington was signed between the Americans and British, nearly all remaining British soldiers were withdrawn from Canada in November 1871. The departure of the majority of British forces in Canada made the Canadian militia the only major land forces available in Canada. In 1940, both components of the militia, PAM and NPAM were reorganized, the former into Canadian Army (Active), the latter into the Canadian Army (Reserve)

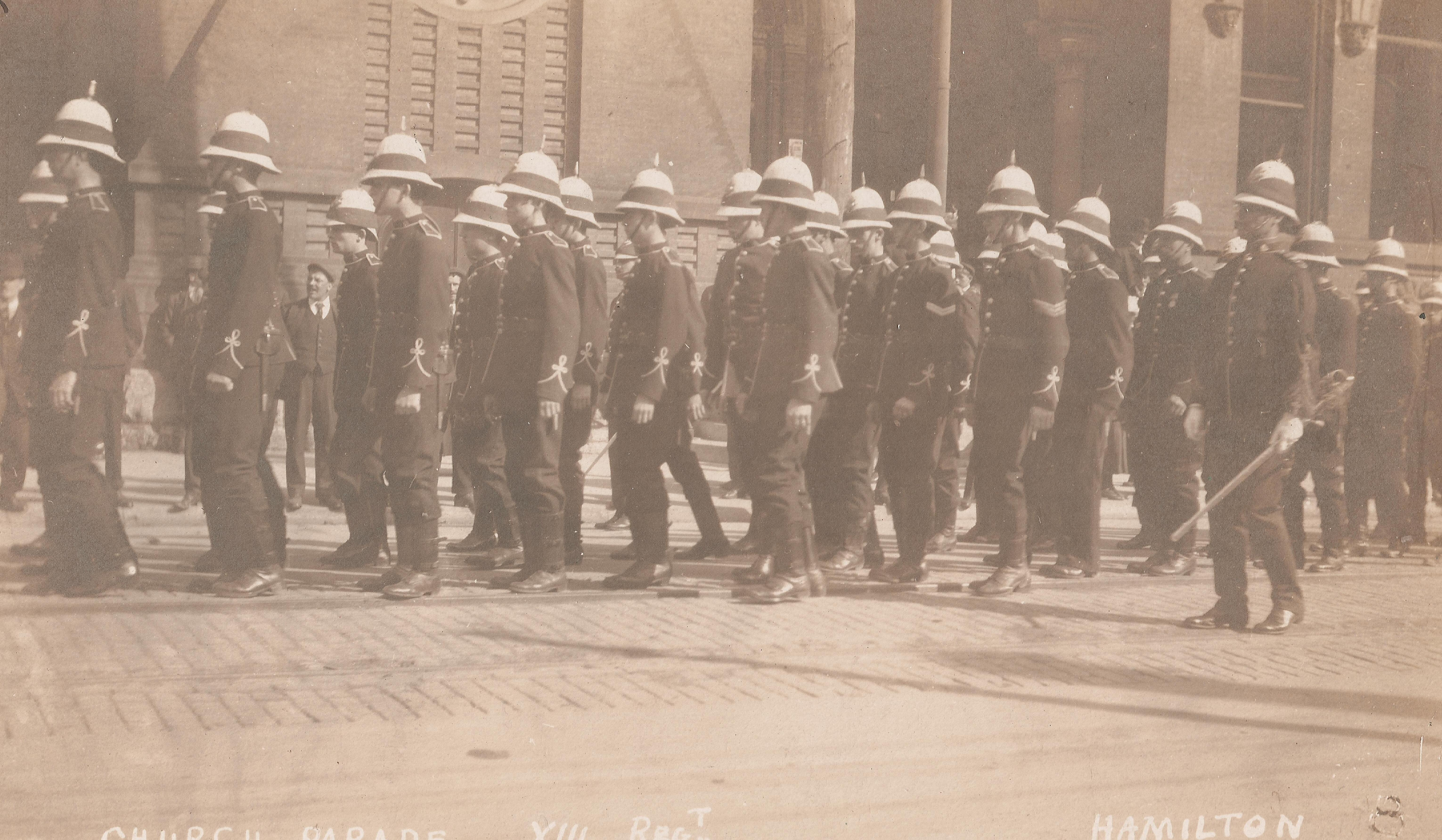
Parade of the 13th Royal Regiment, Canadian Militia in Hamilton, 1915

In addition to the various colonial militia units, and the regiments of the Canadian militia, in 1942, the Army's Pacific Command created the Pacific Coast Militia Rangers. Intended to function similarly to the United Kingdom's Home Guard, the Rangers were a secondary defence force, defending the coast of British Columbia and Yukon from potential Japanese attack. The Rangers were disbanded in September 1945, shortly after the conclusion of World War II. The legacy of the Pacific Coast Militia Rangers is perpetuated by the Canadian Rangers, a component of the Primary Reserve that provides a military presence in areas where it would not be economically or practically viable to have conventional Army units – most notably northern Canada.

The Canadian Army Reserve continued to use the term militia in reference to itself until the unification of the Canadian Armed Forces in 1968. Since unification, no Canadian military force has formally used militia in its name. However, the Canadian Army Reserve is still colloquially referred to as the militia. Members of the Canadian Army Reserve troops typically train one night a week and every other weekend of the month, except in the summer. Summertime training may consist of courses, individual call-outs, or concentrations (unit and formation training of one to two weeks' duration). Most Canadian cities and counties have one or more militia units. Primary Reserve members may volunteer for overseas service, to augment their regular force counterparts—usually during NATO or United Nations missions.

=== China ===
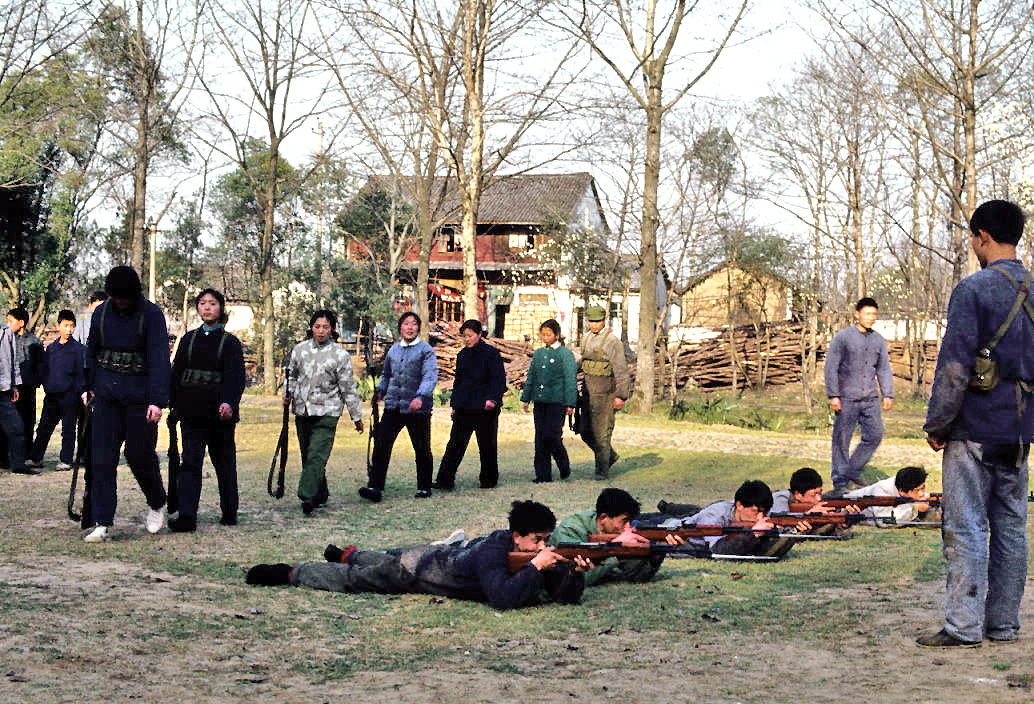
A group of Chinese militia recruits attending shooting practice with Type 56 rifles in Hangzhou (March 1978).

China's current militia is led by the Chinese Communist Party (CCP), and forms part of the Chinese armed forces. Under the command of the military organs, it undertakes such jobs as war preparation services, security and defense operational tasks and assistance in maintaining social order and public security.

Historically, militias of varying levels of ability have existed in China, organized on a village and clan level, especially during periods of instability and in areas subject to pirate and bandit attack. When the British attempted to take control of the New Territories in 1898, they were resisted by the local militias which had been formed for mutual defence against pirate raids. Although ultimately defeated, the militias' dogged resistance convinced the British to make concessions to the indigenous inhabitants allowing them to preserve inheritance, property and marriage rights and customs throughout most of the period of the British rule.

=== Cuba ===
Cuba has three militia organizations: The Territorial Troops Militia (Milicias de Tropas Territoriales) of about one million people (half women), the Youth Labor Army (Ejército Juvenil del Trabajo) devoted to agricultural production, and a naval militia. Formerly, there existed the National Revolutionary Militias (Milicias Nacionales Revolucionarias), which was formed after the Cuban Revolution and initially consisted of 200,000 men who helped the 25,000 strong standing army defeat counter-revolutionary guerillas.

=== Czech Republic ===
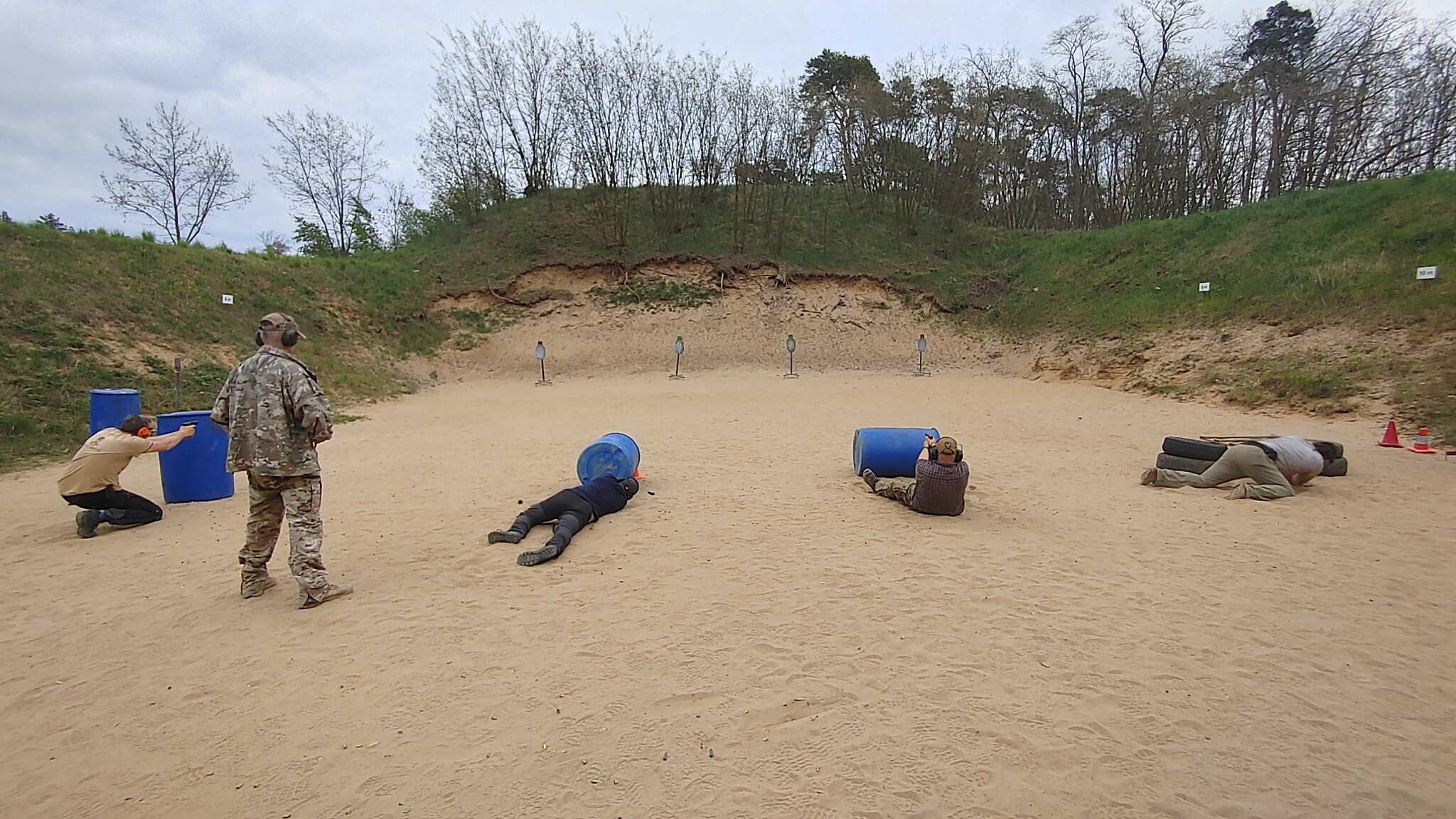
Designated Reserves Level 1 training – shooting from concealment

In 2021, the Czech Parliament passed an Act No. 14/2021 Coll., on the handling of weapons in certain cases affecting the internal order or security of the Czech Republic. The Act's number 14/21 symbolically refers to the 600th anniversary of civilian firearms possession in the country. The legislation establishes "a system of firearms training, the purpose of which is to improve the knowledge, abilities and skills of persons authorised to handle firearms for the purpose of ensuring internal order or the security of the Czech Republic". Gun owners can join government endorsed advanced shooting training courses with their privately owned firearms and become members of the militia-style Designated Reserves.

=== Denmark ===
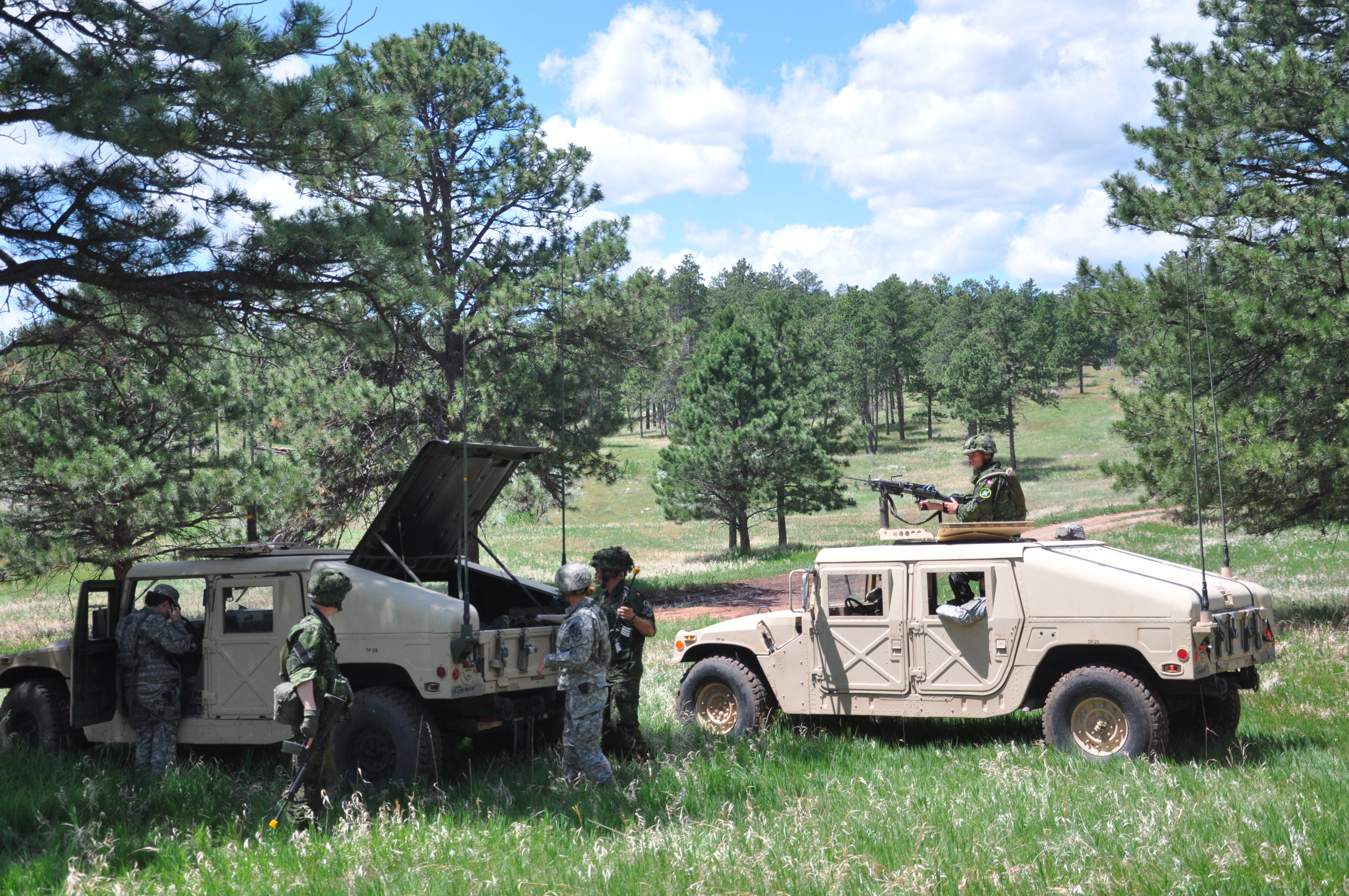
A joint patrol between Arizona National Guard and the Danish Home Guard during the Golden Coyote training exercise.

The Danish Home Guard (Danish: Hjemmeværnet) (HJV) is the fourth service of the Danish military. It was formerly concerned only with the defence of Danish territory but, since 2008, it has also supported Danish international military efforts in Afghanistan, Iraq and Kosovo. There are five branches: Army Home Guard, Naval Home Guard, Air Force Home Guard, Police Home Guard, and Infrastructure Home Guard.

=== Estonia ===
The Omakaitse (Home Guard) was an organisation formed by the local population of Estonia on the basis of the Estonian Defence League and the forest brothers resistance movement active on the Eastern Front between 3 July 1941 and 17 September 1944. This arrangement was unique in the context of the war as in Latvia, which otherwise shared a common fate with Estonia, there was no organisation of this kind.

=== Ethiopia ===
The People's Militia was established in 1975 under the Derg regime's Proclamation No 71, used to assist police forces and protect farms and property. The militia did operations in Eritrea during the Ogaden War, while Mengistu Haile Mariam reconstituted as the "Red Army". The Derg government conscripted about 30,000 to 40,000 civilians into the militia from Shewa, Wollo, and Gojam provinces in May 1976.

The Fano militia is an ethno-nationalist Amhara militia and former protest movement that emerged during the premiership of Abiy Ahmed. Fano intervened armed conflicts in the post-2018 regime, including Benishangul-Gumuz's Metekel conflict, Tigray War and recently War in Amhara. They have been accused of ethnic massacres against other ethnic groups, such as the Qemant and other minorities.

=== Finland ===
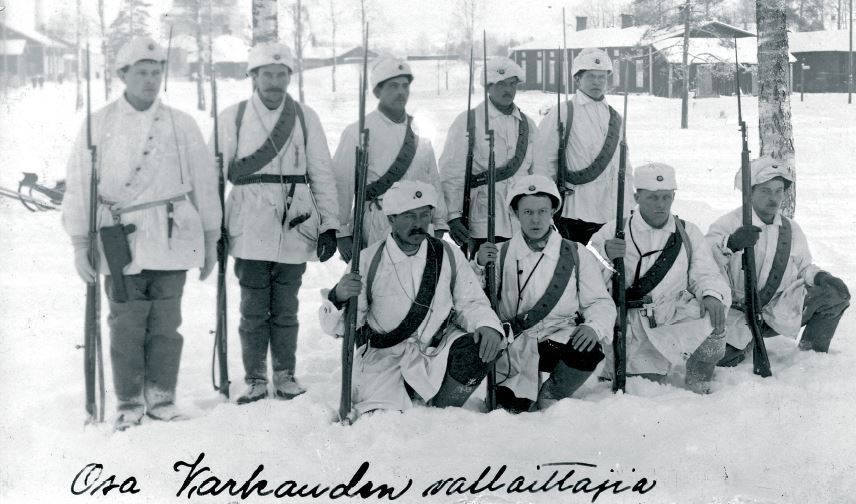
Members of the White Guard after the Battle of Varkaus. The White Guard was a voluntary militia that fought for the Whites in the Finnish Civil War.

While Finland employs conscription, they do not have separate militia units: all units are organized by and under the command of the Finnish Defence Forces. All men belong to the reserve until age 50 or 60 depending on rank, and may be called up in case of mobilization. Each reservist is assigned a position in a unit to be activated. However, since 2004, the FDF does have territorial forces, organized along the lines of regular infantry formations, which are composed of volunteers. Furthermore, long-range patrol units (sissi troops, a type of special forces) are assigned to local troops.

In history, before Finland became independent, two types of local militias existed: the White Guards and Red Guards, which were non-socialists and socialists, respectively. In the Finnish Civil War (1918) the White Guards founded the White Army, which was victorious over the Red Guards. White Guards continued their existence as a volunteer militia until the Second World War. In some cases their activity found overt political expression as in the Mäntsälä rebellion. However, in 1934 separate wartime White Guard units were dissolved and in the Second World War they served at the front, dispersed in regular units. They were dissolved as a condition of peace after the Continuation War.

=== France ===
The first notable militia in French history was the resistance of the Gauls to invasion by the Romans until they were defeated by Julius Caesar. Centuries later, Joan of Arc organized and led a militia until her capture and execution in 1431. This settled the succession to the French crown and laid the basis for the formation of the modern nation of France.

During the French Revolution the National Guard was a political home defense militia. The levée en masse was a conscription army used during the Revolutionary and Napoleonic Wars.

At the time of the Franco-Prussian War, the Parisian National Guard engaged the Prussian Army and later rebelled against the Versailles Army under Marshal McMahon.

Under German occupation during World War II, a militia usually called the French Resistance emerged to conduct a guerrilla war of attrition against German forces and prepare the way for the D-Day Allied Invasion of France. The Resistance militia were opposed by the collaborationist French Militia—the paramilitary police force of the German puppet state of Vichy.

Although defunct from 1871 until 2016, the French National Guard has now been reestablished for homeland security purposes.

=== Germany ===
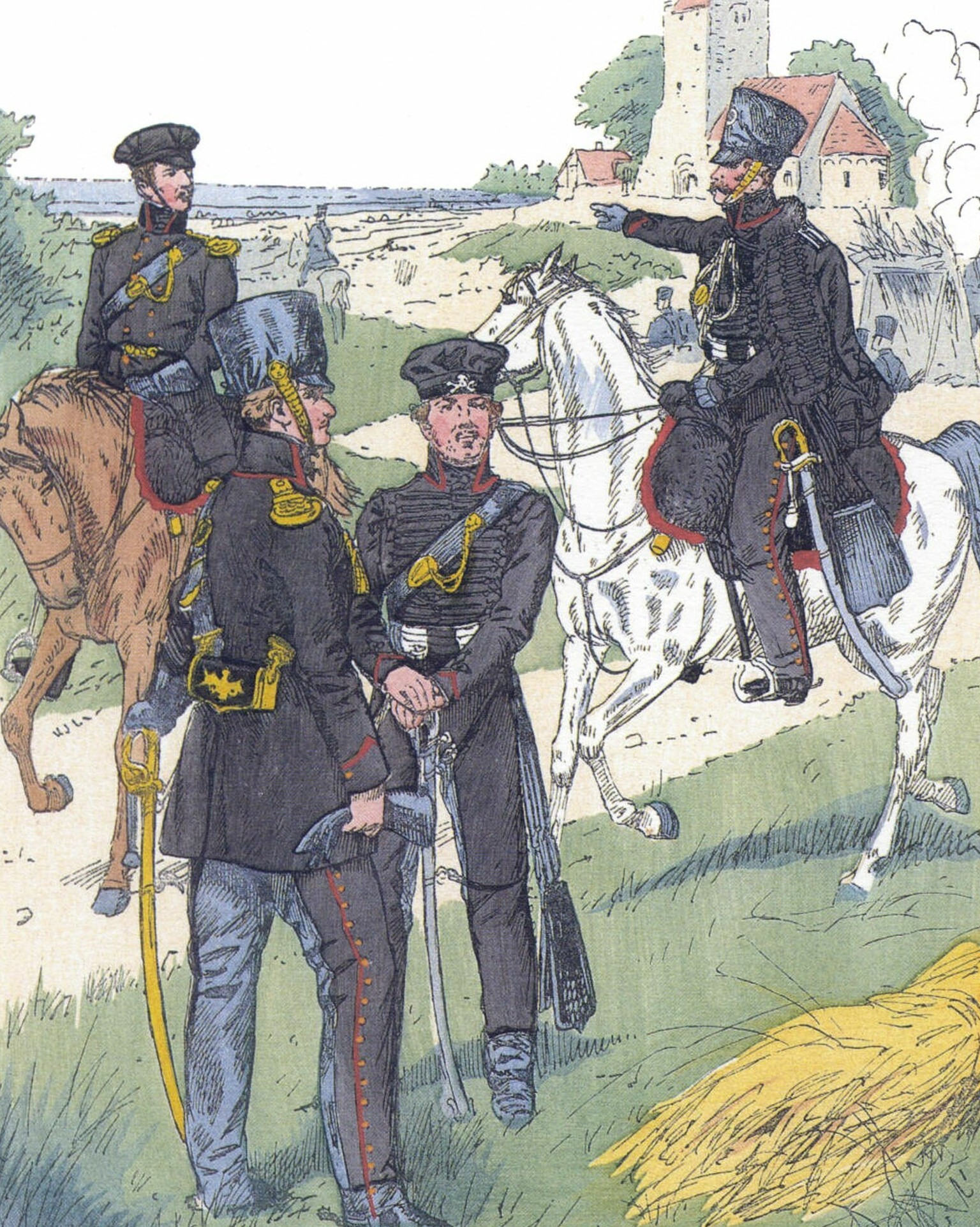
The Lützow Free Corps during the Napoleonic Wars. During the Napoleonic Wars, the Freikorps referred to volunteer forces that fought against the French.

The earliest reports of Germanic militias was the system of hundreds described in AD 98 by the Roman historian Tacitus as the centeni. They were similar in nature to the Anglo-Saxon fyrd. The term "free corps" was originally applied to voluntary armies. The first Freikorps were recruited by Frederick II of Prussia during the Seven Years' War. These troops were regarded as unreliable by regular armies, so they were mainly used as sentries and for minor duties. During the Napoleonic occupation, organizations such as the Lutzow Free Corps fought against the occupiers and later joined the allied forces as regular soldiers.

However, after 1918, the term was used for nationalist paramilitary organizations that sprang up around Germany as soldiers returned in defeat from World War I, also known as Freikorps. They were one of the many Weimar paramilitary groups active during that time. They received considerable support from Gustav Noske, the German Defence Minister who used them to crush the Spartakist League with enormous violence, including the murders of Karl Liebknecht and Rosa Luxemburg on January 15, 1919. Militia were also used to put down the Bavarian Soviet Republic in 1919. They were officially "disbanded" in 1920, resulting in the ill-fated Kapp Putsch in March 1920. The Einwohnerwehr, active in Germany from 1919 to 1921 was a paramilitary citizens' militia consisting of hundreds of thousands of mostly former servicemen. Formed by the Prussian Ministry of the Interior on April 15, 1919, to allow citizens to protect themselves from looters, armed gangs, and revolutionaries, the Einwohnerwehr was under the command of the local Reichswehr regiments, which supplied its guns. In 1921, the Berlin government dissolved the Einwohnerwehr. Many of its members went on to join the Nazi Party.

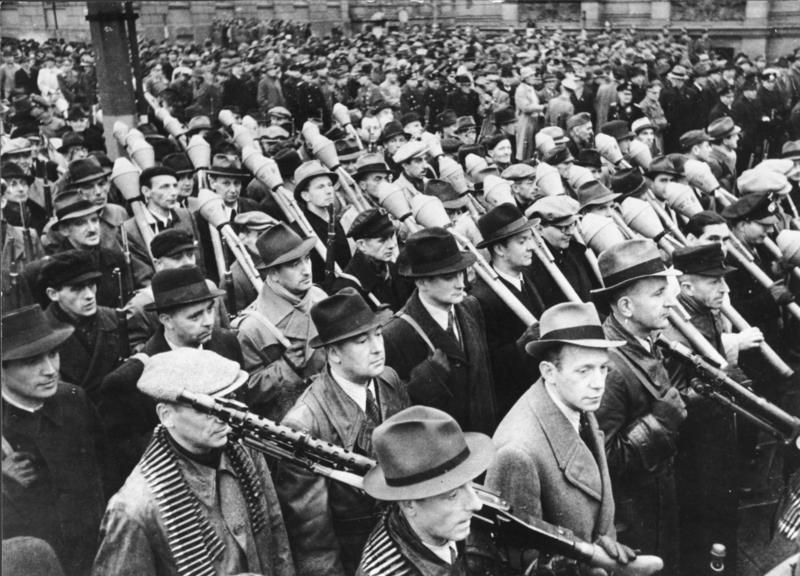
The Volkssturm was a national militia formed by Nazi Germany in the last months of World War II.

In 1921 the Nazi Party created the Sturmabteilung (SA; Storm Detachment; Brownshirts), which was the first paramilitary wing of the Nazi Party and served as a Nazi militia whose initial assignment was to protect Nazi leaders at rallies and assemblies. The SA also took part in street battles against the forces of rival political parties and violent actions against Jews. From the SA sprung the Schutzstaffel (SS; Protective Squadron) which grew to become one of the largest and most powerful groups in Nazi Germany, which Reichsführer-SS Heinrich Himmler (the leader of the SS from 1929) envisioned as an elite group of guards. The Waffen-SS, the military branch of the SS, became a de facto fourth branch of the Wehrmacht.

In 1944–1945, as World War II came to a close in Europe, the German high command deployed increasing numbers of Volkssturm units to combat duties. These regiments were composed of men, women and children too old, young or otherwise unfit for service in the Wehrmacht (German Regular Army). Their primary role was assisting the army with fortification duties and digging anti-tank ditches. As the shortage of manpower became severe, they were used as front line infantry, most often in urban settings. Due to the physical state of members, almost non-existent training and shortage of weapons, there was not much the Volkssturm could do except act like shields for regular army units.

=== Great Britain and Ireland ===
==== Origins ====
The obligation to serve in the militia (also known as the Constitutional Force) in England derives from a common law tradition, and dates back to Anglo-Saxon times. The tradition was that all able-bodied males were liable to be called out to serve in one of two organisations. These were the posse comitatus, an ad hoc assembly called together by a law officer to apprehend lawbreakers, and the fyrd, a military body intended to preserve internal order or defend the locality against an invader. The latter developed into the militia, and was usually embodied by a royal warrant. Service in each organisation involved different levels of preparedness.

==== 16th and 17th centuries ====
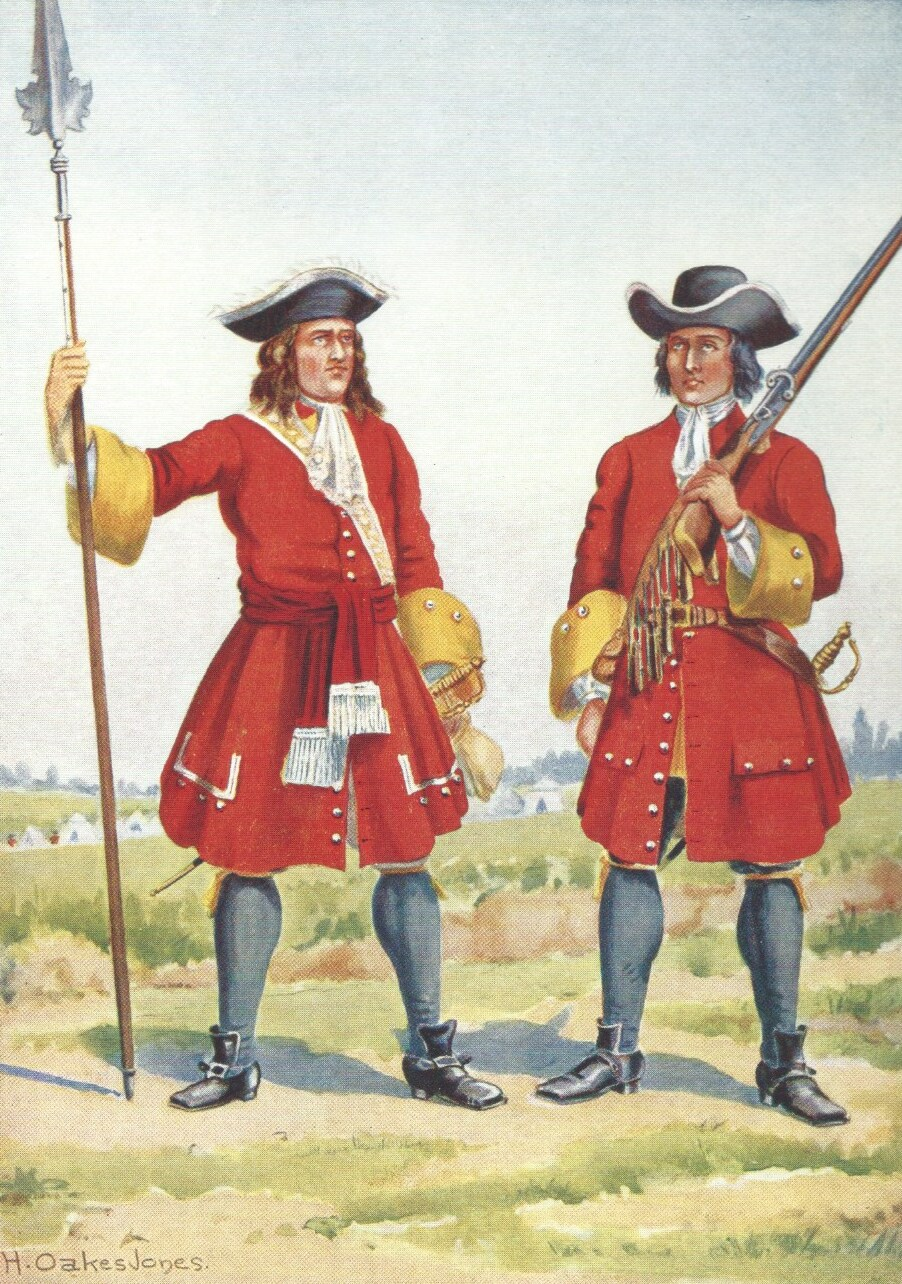
A sergeant and private of the Somerset Militia in 1685

With the decay of the feudal system and the military revolution of the 16th century, the militia began to become an important institution in English life. It was organised on the basis of the shire county, and was one of the responsibilities of the Lord Lieutenant, a royal official (usually a trusted nobleman). Each of the county hundreds was likewise the responsibility of a Deputy Lieutenant, who relayed orders to the justices of the peace or magistrates. Every parish furnished a quota of eligible men, whose names were recorded on muster rolls. Likewise, each household was assessed for the purpose of finding weapons, armour, horses, or their financial equivalent, according to their status. The militia was supposed to be mustered for training purposes from time to time, but this was rarely done. The militia regiments were consequently ill-prepared for an emergency, and could not be relied upon to serve outside their own counties. This state of affairs concerned many people. Consequently, an elite force was created, composed of members of the militia who were prepared to meet regularly for military training and exercise. These were formed into trained band regiments, particularly in the City of London, where the Artillery Ground was used for training. The trained bands performed an important role in the English Civil War on the side of parliament, in marching to raise the siege of Gloucester (5 September 1643). Except for the London trained bands, both sides in the Civil War made little use of the militia, preferring to recruit their armies by other means.

==== Militia in the English Empire and the British Empire ====
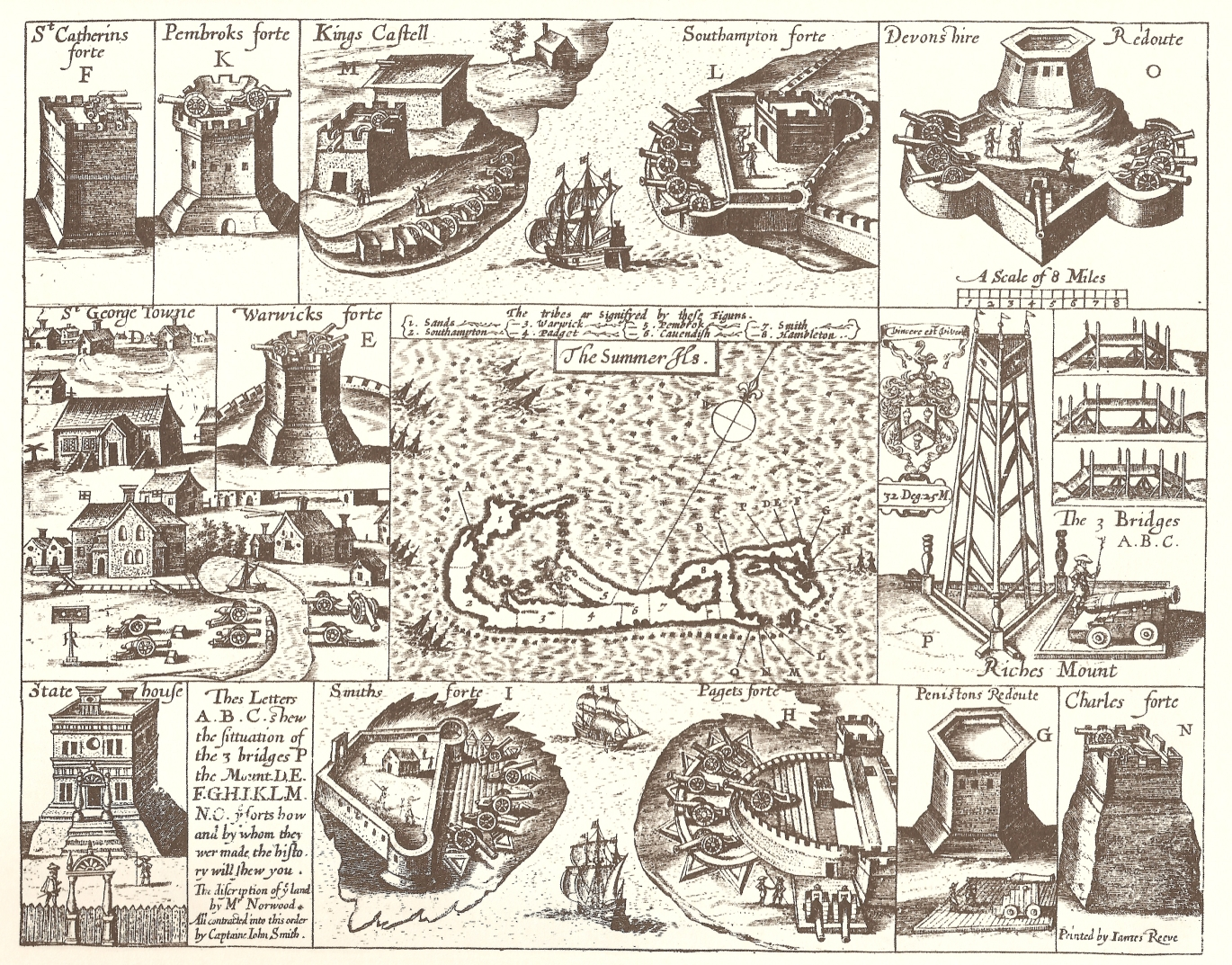
Captain John Smith's 1624 map of the Somers Isles (Bermuda), showing St. George's Town and related fortifications, including the Castle Islands Fortifications with their garrisons of militia infantry and volunteer artillery.

As successful English settlement of North America began to take place in 1607 in the face of the hostile intentions of the powerful Spanish, and of the native populations, it became immediately necessary to raise militia amongst the settlers. The militia in Jamestown saw constant action against the Powhatan Federation and other native polities. In the Virginia Company's other outpost, Bermuda, fortification began immediately in 1612. A Spanish attack in 1614 was repulsed by two shots fired from the incomplete Castle Islands Fortifications manned by Bermudian Militiamen. In the Nineteenth century, Fortress Bermuda would become Britain's Gibraltar of the West, heavily fortified by a Regular Army garrison to protect the Royal Navy's headquarters and dockyard in the Western Atlantic.

In the 17th century, however, Bermuda's defence was left entirely in the hands of the Militia. In addition to requiring all male civilians to train and serve in the militia of their Parish, the Bermudian Militia included a standing body of trained artillerymen to garrison the numerous fortifications which ringed New London (St. George's). This standing body was created by recruiting volunteers, and by sentencing criminals to serve as punishment. The Bermudian militiamen were called out on numerous occasions of war, and, on one notable occasion, to quell rioting privateers. The 1707 Acts of Union made Bermudian and other English militiamen British. The Militia in Bermuda came to include a Troop of Horse (mounted infantry) and served alongside volunteers and (from 1701) a small body of regulars. The Militia faded away after the American War of 1812 when the Parliament of Bermuda declined to renew the Militia Act. This resulted from the build-up of the regular army Bermuda Garrison along with Bermuda's development as the headquarters and dockyard of the North America and West Indies Station of the Royal Navy, which made the militia seem excess to need. Vast sums of the Imperial defence expenditure were lavished on fortifying Bermuda during the 19th century and the British Government cajoled, implored, begged, and threatened the colonial legislature for 80 years before it raised a militia and volunteer units (in 1894 and 1894 respectively). Although the militia had historically been an infantry force, many units in Britain had been re-tasked as militia artillery from the 1850s onward due to the increased importance of the coastal artillery defences and the new militia unit in Bermuda followed suit. Titled the Bermuda Militia Artillery, it was badged and uniformed as part of the Royal Artillery, and tasked with the garrison artillery role, manning coastal batteries. As in Britain, recruitment was of volunteers who engaged for terms of service, whereas the Bermuda Volunteer Rifle Corps was organised on the same lines as volunteer rifle corps in Britain. Recruitment to the BVRC was restricted to whites, but the BMA recruited primarily coloured (those who were not entirely of European heritage) other ranks, though its officers were all white until 1953. Neither unit was reorganised in 1908 when the Militia, Volunteer Force and Yeomanry in Britain merged into the Territorial Force, but the BVRC was re-organised as a territorial in 1921 and the BMA in 1926. The BVRC name was not modified to Bermuda Rifles until 1951, however, and the Bermuda Militia Artillery (and from 1939 the Bermuda Militia Infantry) continued to be titled as militia until amalgamated with the Bermuda Rifles in 1965 to form the Bermuda Regiment.

In British India, a special class of militia was established in 1907. This took the form of the Frontier Corps, which consisted of locally recruited full-time auxiliaries under British officers. Their role combined the functions of tribal police and border guards deployed along the North-West Frontier. Regional units included the Zhob Militia, the Kurram Militia, and the Chagai Militia. After 1946 the Frontier Corps became part of the modern Pakistan Army.

==== Political issues ====
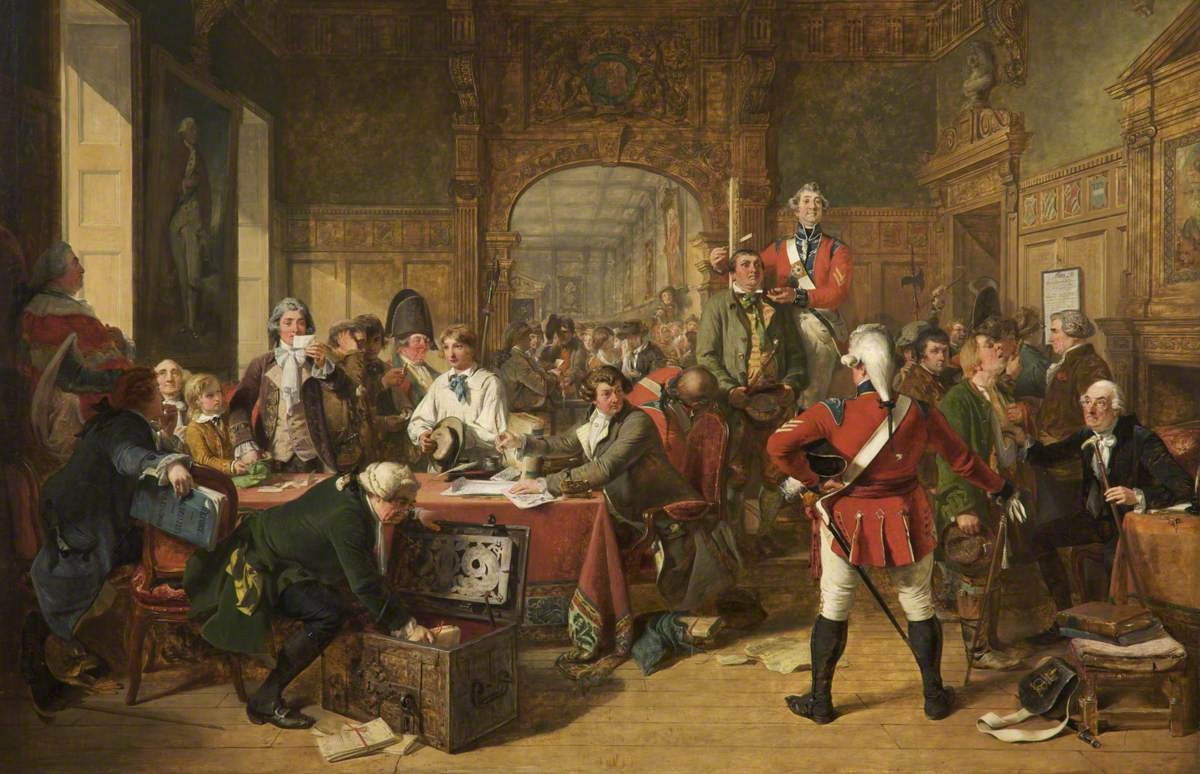
1849 painting of recruits being mustered into the British Militia during the 1790s

Until the Glorious Revolution in 1688 the Crown and Parliament were in strong disagreement. The English Civil War left a rather unusual military legacy. Both Whigs and Tories distrusted the creation of a large standing army not under civilian control. The former feared that it would be used as an instrument of royal tyranny. The latter had memories of the New Model Army and the anti-monarchical social and political revolution that it brought about. Both preferred a small standing army under civilian control for defensive deterrence and to prosecute foreign wars, a large navy as the first line of national defence, and a militia composed of their neighbours as additional defence and to preserve domestic order.

Consequently, the 1689 English Bill of Rights declared, amongst other things: "that the raising or keeping a standing army within the kingdom in time of peace, unless it be with consent of Parliament, is against law..." and "that the subjects which are Protestants may have arms for their defence suitable to their conditions and as allowed by law." This implies that they are fitted to serve in the militia, which was intended to serve as a counterweight to the standing army and preserve civil liberties against the use of the army by a tyrannical monarch or government. The Standing Army Controversy from 1697 to 1699 reflected the suspicion of both Tories and Radical Whigs of standing armies, a suspicion that would continue in opposition circles.

The Crown still (in the British constitution) controls the use of the army. This ensures that officers and enlisted men swear an oath to a politically neutral head of state, and not to a politician. While the funding of the standing army subsists on annual financial votes by Parliament, the Mutiny Act, superseded by the Army Act, and now the Armed Forces Act is also renewed every five years by Parliament. If it lapses, the legal basis for enforcing discipline disappears, and soldiers lose their legal indemnity for acts committed under orders.

With the creation of the British Empire, militias were also raised in the colonies, where little support could be provided by regular forces. Overseas militias were first raised in Jamestown, Virginia, and in Bermuda, where the Bermuda Militia followed over the next two centuries a similar trajectory to that in Britain.

==== 18th century and the Acts of Union ====
In 1707 the Acts of Union united the Kingdom of England with the Kingdom of Scotland. The Scottish navy was incorporated into the Royal Navy. The Scottish military (as opposed to naval) forces merged with the English, with pre-existing regular Scottish regiments maintaining their identities, though command of the new British Army was from England. How this affected militias either side of the border is unclear.

===== British Militia =====
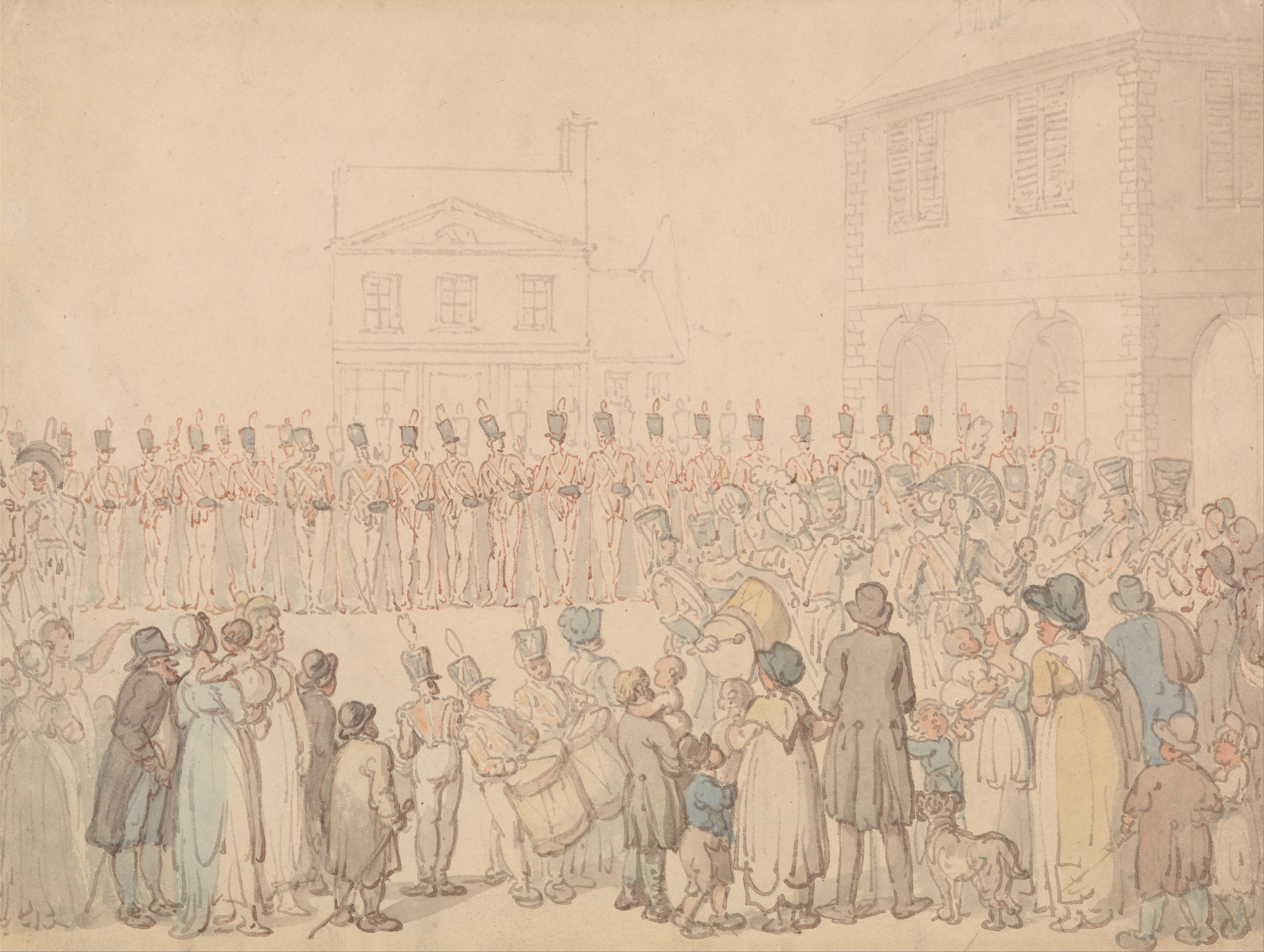
The Northampton Militia being reviewed at Brackley

The Militia Act 1757 created a more professional force. Better records were kept, and the men were selected by ballot to serve for longer periods; specific provision was made for members of the Religious Society of Friends, Quakers, to be exempted, as conscientious objectors, from compulsory enlistment in the militia. Proper uniforms and better weapons were provided, and the force was 'embodied' from time to time for training sessions.

The militia was widely embodied at various times during the French and Napoleonic Wars. It served at several vulnerable locations, and was particularly stationed on the South Coast and in Ireland. A number of camps were held at Brighton, where the militia regiments were reviewed by the Prince Regent. (This is the origin of the song "Brighton Camp".) The militia could not be compelled to serve overseas, but it was seen as a training reserve for the army, as bounties were offered to men who opted to 'exchange' from the militia to the regular army.

===== Irish militia =====
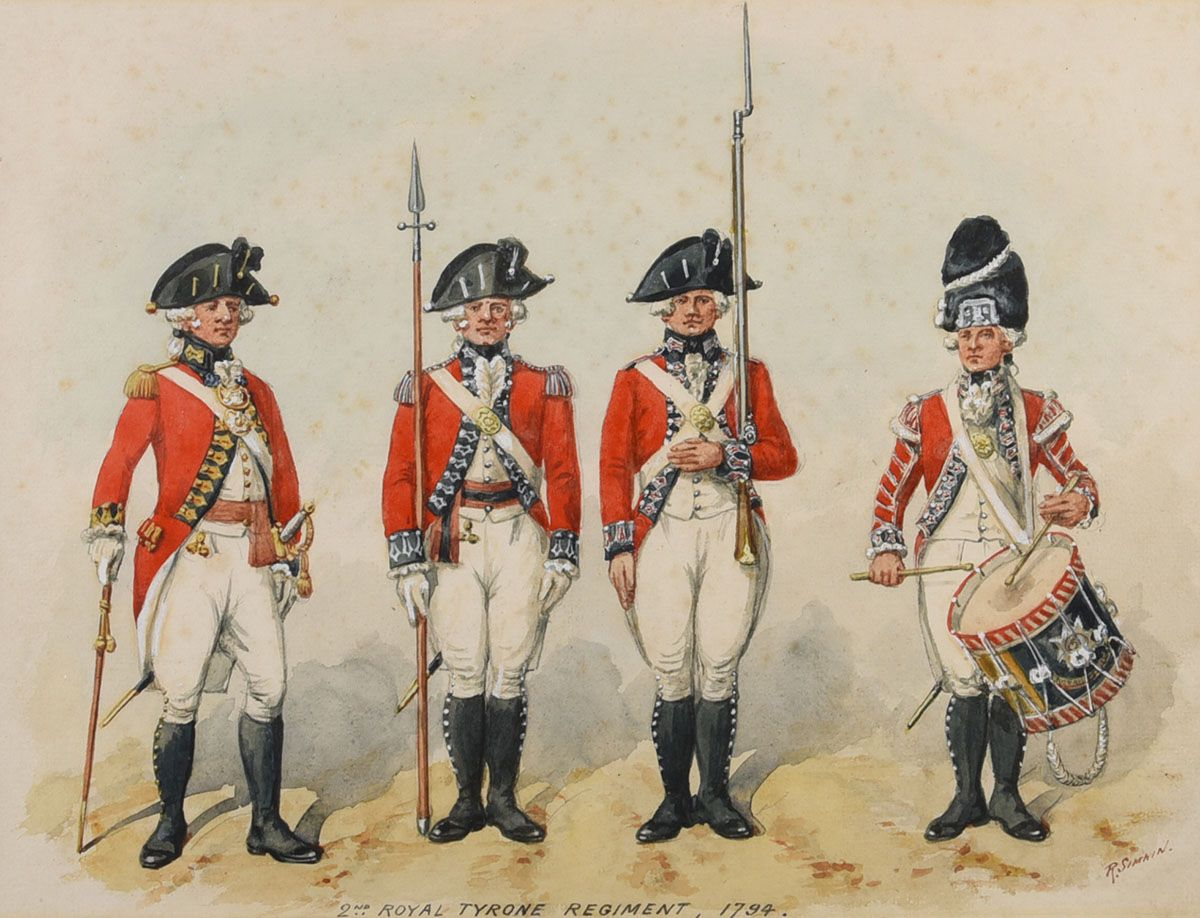
Lieutenant, sergeant, private and drummer of the Royal Tyrone Militia in 1794

The Parliament of Ireland passed the Militia Act (Ireland) 1715 raising regiments of militia in each county and county corporate. Membership was restricted to Protestants between the ages of 16 and 60. In 1793, during the Napoleonic Wars, the Irish militia were reorganised to form thirty-seven county and city regiments. While officers of the reorganised force were Protestant, membership of the other ranks was now made available to members of all denominations.

===== Scottish militia =====
In the late 17th century, numerous individuals in the Kingdom of Scotland (then in a personal union with the Kingdom of England) called for the resurrection of a Scottish militia, with the understated aim of protecting the rights of Scots in Great Britain. After Scotland became part of the Kingdom of Great Britain, the Militia Act 1757 did not apply there. The traditional Scottish militia system continued, with only certain settlements in Scotland playing host to a militia regiment. This was viewed with resentment among some in Scotland, and the Militia Club was formed to promote the raising of a Scottish militia. The Militia Club, along with several other Scottish gentlemen's clubs became the crucible of the Scottish Enlightenment. The Militia Act 1797 empowered Scottish Lord Lieutenants to raise and command militia regiments in each of the "Counties, Stewartries, Cities, and Places" under their jurisdiction.

==== 19th century ====
Although muster rolls were prepared as late as 1820, the element of compulsion was abandoned, and the militia transformed into a volunteer force, revived by the Militia Act 1852. It was intended to be seen as an alternative to the regular army. Men would volunteer and undertake basic training for several months at an army depot. Thereafter, they would return to civilian life, but report for regular periods of military training (usually on the weapons ranges) and an annual two-week training camp. In return, they would receive military pay and a financial retainer, a useful addition to their civilian wage. Of course, many saw the annual camp as the equivalent of a paid holiday. The militia thus appealed to agricultural labourers, colliers and the like, men in casual occupations, who could leave their civilian job and pick it up again. Until 1852 the militia were an entirely infantry force, but from that year a number of county infantry regiments were converted to artillery and new ones raised. In 1877 the militia of Anglesey and Monmouthshire were converted to engineers. Under the reforms, introduced by Secretary of State for War Hugh Childers in 1881, the remaining militia infantry regiments were re-designated as numbered battalions of regiments of the line, ranking after the two regular battalions. Typically, an English, Welsh or Scottish regiment would have two militia battalions (the 3rd and 4th) and Irish regiments three (numbered 3rd–5th).

The militia must not be confused with the volunteer units created in a wave of enthusiasm in the second half of the nineteenth century. In contrast with the Volunteer Force, and the similar Yeomanry Cavalry, they were considered rather plebeian.

==== The Special Reserve ====
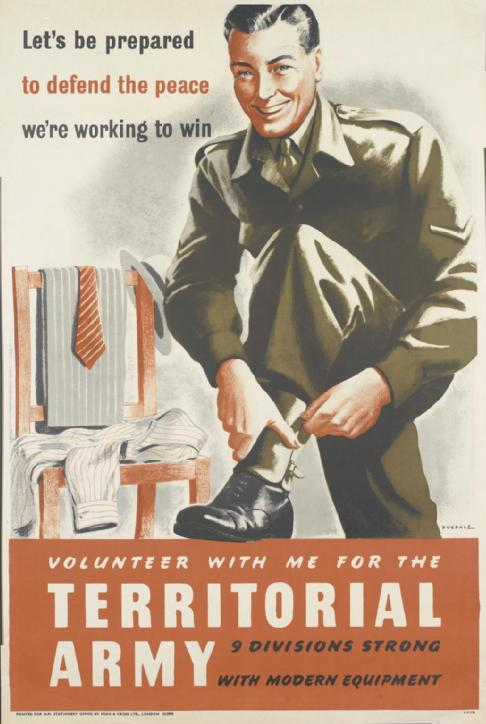
Recruitment poster for the British Territorial Army during World War II. The reserve force was formed after the militias were reorganized in 1907.

The militia was transformed into the Special Reserve by the military reforms of Haldane in the reforming post 1906 Liberal government. In 1908 the militia infantry battalions were redesignated as "reserve" and a number were amalgamated or disbanded. Numbered Territorial Force battalions, ranking after the Special Reserve, were formed from the volunteer units at the same time. Altogether, 101 infantry battalions, 33 artillery regiments and two engineer regiments of special reservists were formed. Upon mobilisation, the special reserve units would be formed at the depot and continue training while guarding vulnerable points in Britain. The special reserve units remained in Britain throughout the First World War, but their rank and file did not, since the object of the special reserve was to supply drafts of replacements for the overseas units of the regiment. The original militiamen soon disappeared, and the battalions simply became training units. The Special Reserve reverted to its militia designation in 1921, then to Supplementary Reserve in 1924, though the units were effectively placed in "suspended animation" until disbanded in 1953.

==== The militiamen ====
The name was briefly revived in the Military Training Act 1939, in the aftermath of the Munich Crisis. Leslie Hore-Belisha, Secretary of State for War, wished to introduce a limited form of conscription, not known in peacetime Britain since the militia of the early 19th century and previously. It was thought that calling the conscripts 'militiamen' would make this more acceptable, as it would render them distinct from the rest of the army. Only single men aged 20 up to the day before their 22nd birthday were to be conscripted, for six months full-time training before discharge into the reserve (with a free suit of civilian clothing). Although the first intake was called up in late July 1939, the declaration of war on 3 September entailed implementation of full-time conscription for all men aged 18–41, superseding the militia, never to be revived.

==== Modern survivals ====
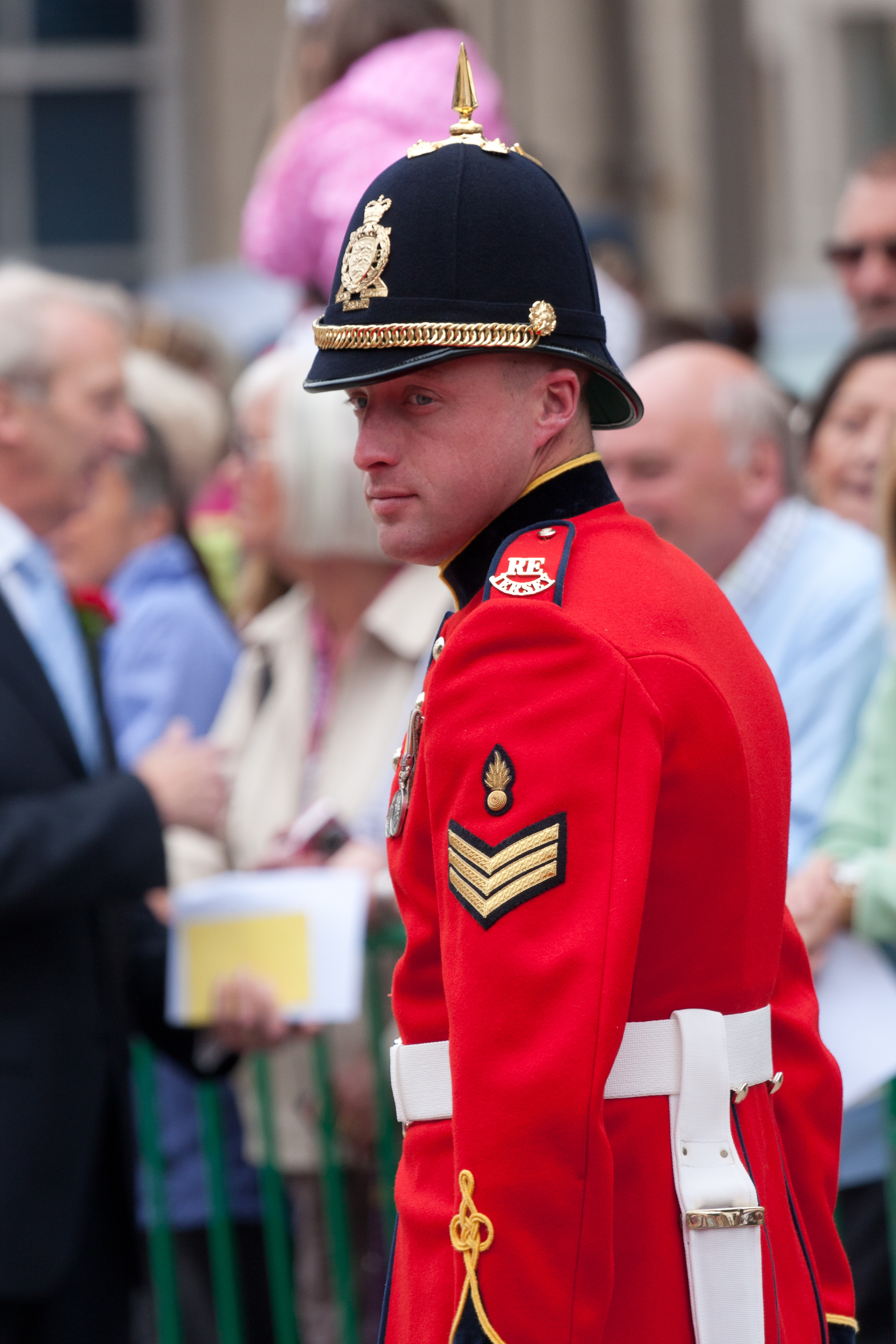
A non-commissioned officer of the Royal Militia of the Island of Jersey. The unit is one of two regiments in the Territorial Army that maintain their militia designation.

Three units still maintain their militia designation in the British Army. These are the Royal Monmouthshire Royal Engineers (formed in 1539), the Jersey Field Squadron (The Royal Militia Island of Jersey) (formed in 1337), and the Royal Alderney Militia (created in the 13th century and reformed in 1984). Additionally, the Atholl Highlanders are a ceremonial infantry militia maintained by the Duke of Atholl—they are the only legal private army in Europe.

==== Other British militias ====
Various other part-time, home defence organisations have been raised during times of crisis or perceived threat, although without the word "militia" in their title. These have included:

- Volunteer Corps, part of the British anti-invasion preparations of 1803–1805
- Yeomanry, volunteer cavalry initially raised in the Napoleonic Wars
- Volunteer Force, from 1857 to 1908
- Volunteer Training Corps, 1914 to 1918
- National Defence Companies, 1936 to 1939
- Home Guard, initially Local Defence Volunteers, 1940 to 1944 and 1951 to 1957
- Ulster Defence Regiment, 1970 to 1992
- Home Service Force, 1982 to 1992

==== The Troubles and Irish War of Independence ====
The various non-state paramilitary groups involved in the 20th-century conflicts in Northern Ireland and the island of Ireland, such as the various Irish Republican Army groups and loyalist paramilitaries, could also be described as militias and are occasionally referred to as such.

The Ulster Defence Regiment (UDR) was a locally raised professional militia instituted by an Act of Parliament in December 1969, becoming operational on 1 April 1970. Created as a non-partisan force to defend Northern Ireland "against armed attack or sabotage", it eventually peaked at 11 battalions with 7,559 men and women. 197 soldiers of the UDR were killed as active servicemen, with a further 61 killed after leaving the regiment, mostly by the Provisional Irish Republican Army. As a result of defence cuts it was eventually reduced to 7 battalions before being amalgamated with the Royal Irish Rangers in 1992 to form the "Home Service Battalions" of the Royal Irish Regiment.

=== India ===
Salwa Judum (meaning "Peace March" or "Purification Hunt" in Gondi language) was a militia active in the Chhattisgarh state of India.

Village Defence Guards, formerly known as Village Defence Committees, were first set up in 1995. The idea of the VDCs was to arm ex-service personnel to check Pakistani infiltration and espionage. The VDCs were formed in Jammu region of J&K to offer self-defence capabilities to villagers in the face of looming terrorist threats. Under the scheme, each VDC used to have a Special Police Officer (SPO) as its in-charge and there were 10-15 other volunteer members, mostly ex-service personnel. They were given .303 rifles and ammunition. The SPO in charge of the VDC was paid whereas the rest were volunteers. In 2020, the policy of Village Defence Committees was revamped and Village Defence Groups were introduced, members of whom are called Village Defence Guards. It was not just a change of name as the very structure of committees was changed. Unlike VDCs where only SPOs were paid, all VDGs are paid.

A total of 4,153 Village Defence Groups (VDG) and 32,355 Special Police Officers were engaged in Jammu and Kashmir in different responsibilities for the protection of civilians and anti-terrorists operations.

=== Iran ===
The Basij militia founded by Ayatollah Ruhollah Khomeini in November 1979, is composed of 90,000 men, with an active and reserve strength up to 300,000 men. It ultimately draws from about 1 million members, and is subordinate to the Islamic Revolutionary Guard Corps in Iran.

=== Iraq ===
Since the rise of ISIL in 2014 and their conquest of many predominantly-Sunni areas in Iraq, the Shiite militias became even more prominent in the country by joining the Iraqi Army in many major battles against ISIL.

=== Israel ===
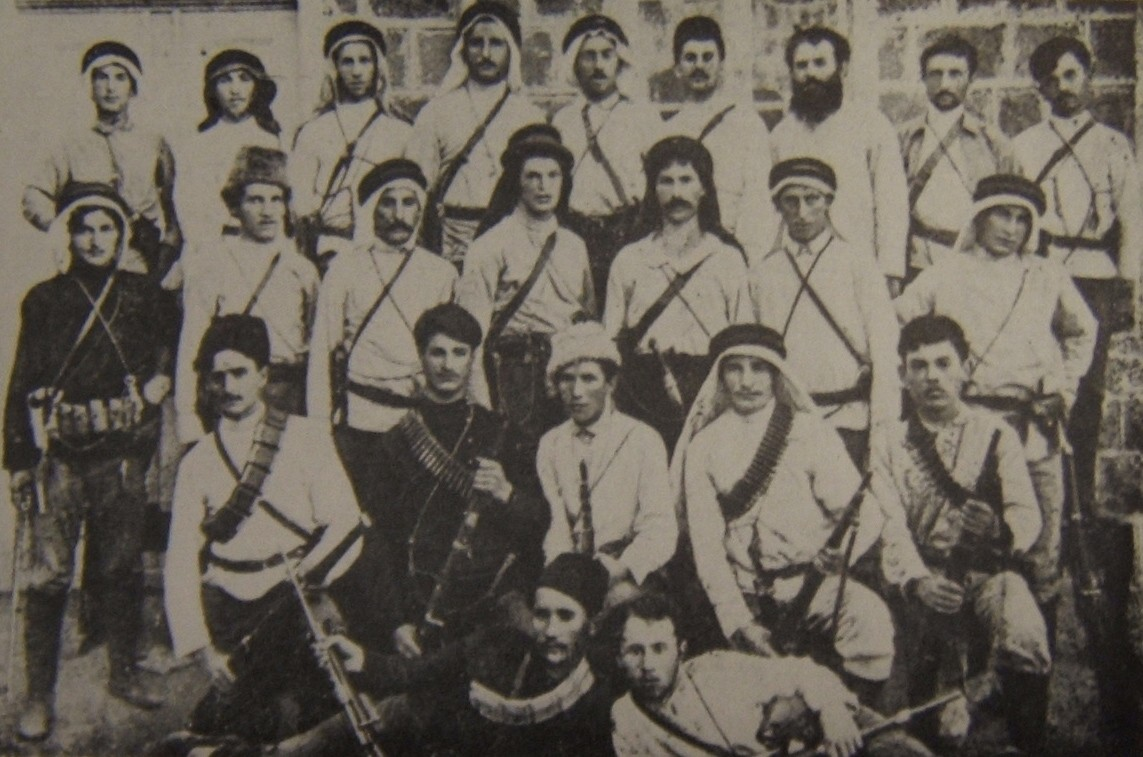
Hashomer in 1909

In 1908 a Jewish underground organisation, Bar Giora, re-invented itself as an armed militia – Hashomer. It was established to provide Jewish guards for the Zionist colonies being established in Ottoman Palestine. The group existed for 10 years. At its height it had around 100 members, including 23 women.

In modern times, the Israel Defense Forces (IDF) is often described as a heavily armed militia, not a full-fledged army, since it is legally and publicly viewed as a defensive force only, and since it relies heavily on the reserve duty of Israeli citizens who are annually called to service for set periods of time, rather than on professional, full-time soldiers. Israeli settlements in the Israeli-occupied territories rely on armed militia teams for their security. National service conscripts can also serve in the Israel Border Police (commonly known by its Hebrew abbreviation Magav which means border guard in Hebrew), which is a paramilitary branch of the Israel Police rather than the IDF.

=== Latvia ===
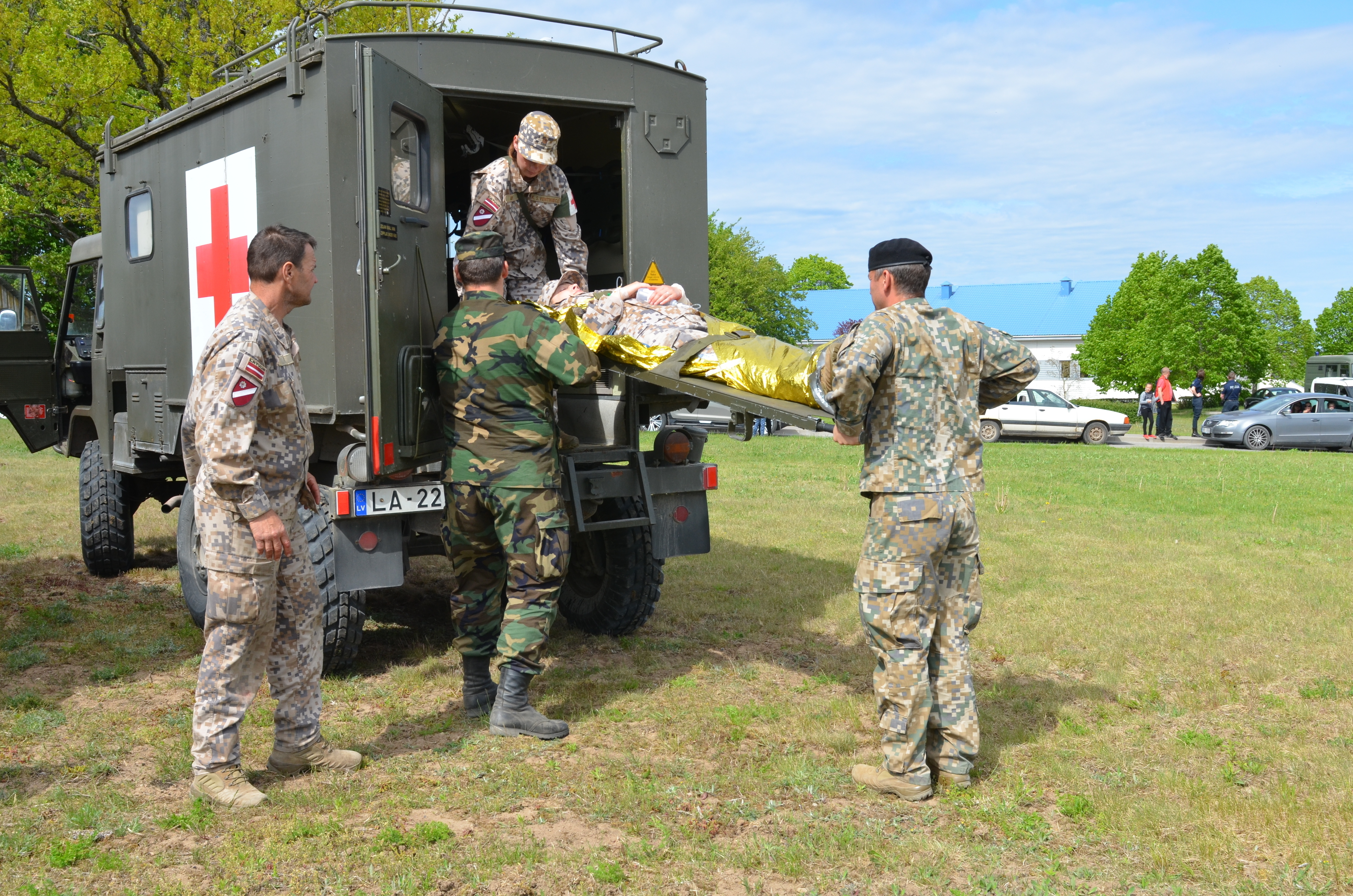
Members of the Latvian National Guard during a training exercise. The Guard was created in 1991 as a voluntary military self-defense force.

=== Libya ===
Since the fall of Gaddafi's rule of Libya in the aftermath of the Libyan Civil War, rebel groups that have contributed to the revolution splintered into self-organized militia movements and have been involved in a feud for control of each city. Since the revolution, reports of clashes and violence by militia groups have been increasing.

=== Mexico ===
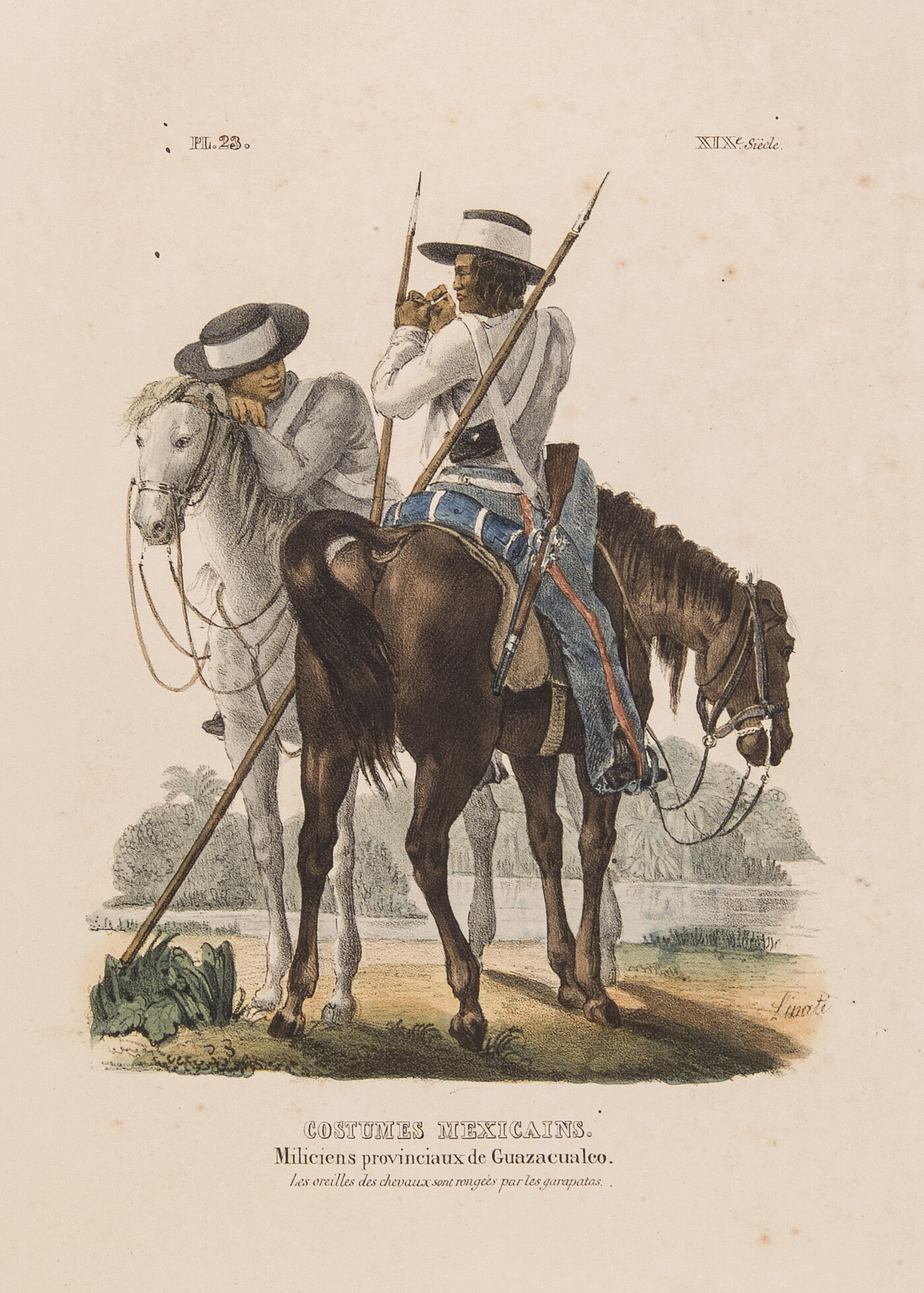
1828 illustration of lancers of the Coatzacoalcos militia

Mexico has a history of various activities and insurrection by militia and paramilitary groups dating back several hundred years that include the exploits of historical figures such as Captain Manuel Pineda Munoz and Francisco "Pancho" Villa. This also includes groups such as the Free-Colored Militia (the interracial militias of New Spain, Colonial Mexico), the Camisas Doradas, and the contemporary Self Defense Council of Michoacan.

Free-colored militias were an important and at times critical organization in Colonial Mexico. Prior to the eighteenth century, Spain's territories in the Americas were mainly defended through a series of Spanish military units being based in strategic coastal port cities and important economic centers. But as European rivals began to challenge the Spanish crown and their dominance in the new world, the Bourbon dynasty initiated a series of reforms, allowing people from their colonies to serve in the regular armies, as well as permitting local militias in their territories.

While these groups began to integrate themselves into the official Spanish colonial militaries, free-colored militias have been reluctantly used since the-mid sixteenth century. Palenques, or run away slave communities, would often initiate slavery uprising in various cities and towns in New Spain, which made the colonial Spanish authorities uneasy about arming any free colored individuals. Free colored rebellions and violence in Mexico City impacted regional policy of New Spain towards blacks. Given this social context, the racial climate in which these free-colored militias first appeared was a hostile one, and the first militias often had conflicts within them between their free-colored and white commanders. The first large scale recruitment of fee-colored militias was in response to the attack on Veracruz port in 1683 by Dutch pirateer Lorenzo de Graff, with free-colored soldiers being called in from Mexico City, Puebla, Orizaba and other large colonial cities. Militias increasingly began to take shape and develop over the course of the 17th and 18th centuries, but it's critical to understand that their development was not a linear progressive one. The experiences of militias in urban areas was vastly different from those in rural communities, and the role, influence, and duties of militias in the early 17th century were not the same as those of a century later. The critical stage for militia growth was during 1670–1762, where there was an increase of the militias responsibilities and they gained a considerable amount of autonomy over their own affairs. The social impact of these free-colored militias added complexity to the race-based caste system that dominated the social landscape.

Free-colored militias were structured to follow the tercio organizational model that was used by Spanish Habsburg and Bourbon dynasties. Tercios compromised 2,500 soldiers distributed among ten companies, each under the leadership of a captain. Free-colored militias under the tercio system were headed by a sargento mayor (major) who became the senior operating officer in militias. Under the sargento mayor were the junior officers, which included one captain and alferez (lieutenant) per company, who were also aided by an ayudante (adjutant) and subteniente (second lieutenant) after they were incorporated into the system after 1767. The captain had supreme authority within their company, only reporting to the sargento mayor when he could not control matters of the company. The alferez coordinated affairs with his captain and was next in line in command in his absence. Below the junior officers were ranking NCO's and up to four sergeants served per company. A cabo (corporal) was assigned to lead each squad of 25 soldiers. These NCO's were responsible for discipline of the soldiers and maintaining a limited record of individuals. Officers and first sergeants were the only soldiers in the free-colored militias to receive a monthly salary with lower ranked soldiers only receiving pay when on campaigns. Their salaries came from the royal treasuries, alongside occasional supplementation by private contributions of prominent individuals.

Who exactly constitutes as a "free-colored person" is subject to much debate and discussion. While the terms pardos, mulatos, negros and morenos were commonly used under the caste system that was in place during this era, their use in this context is much more complex and who exactly qualified as who was a very fluid process, dependent on the social context of the time and place. Despite the lack of universal understanding of racial identification across New Spain, when they were faced with external threats to their organizations, free-colored militias showed great racial unity in these times, such as in the case of Huajolotitlan, a small town of Oaxaca in southern Mexico. After a decree was passed in 1784 calling for the retirement of every free-colored officer and the disbandment of their militia, the tows free-coloreds fiercely resisted. Free-colored soldiers refused to leave their posts and they dispatched to the capital in protests to defend their racially integrated organizations. This later inspired the communities other free-colored people to protests what they saw as other aggressions by the government, such as increasing tribute burdens.

While some of the previous examples are historical, the current official view on the existence of such militias in Mexico, when they are not backed by the government, has been to always label them as illegal and to combat them in a military and a political way.

Modern examples on the Mexican view on militias are the Chiapas conflict against the EZLN and against the EPR in Guerrero, where the government forces combated the upraised militias. And in a more recent case when civilian self-defence militias appeared during the Mexican war on drugs, the government regulated them and transformed the militias in to Rural federal forces, and those who resisted were combated and imprisoned.

=== Montenegro ===
In 1910, King Nicholas I of Montenegro proclaimed that all male citizens were members of a national militia and had both a right and a duty to own at least one Gasser Pattern revolver under penalty of law.

The official reason for the King's decree was to create an armed populace that would deter neighbouring countries from attacking Montenegro, which was unable to field a large army. However, it was widely believed in Montenegro that this decision was actually taken because the King owned shares in Leopold Gasser Waffenfabrik in Vienna – the patent holder and sole manufacturer of the pistol at that time. Despite this, the decree actually obliged Montenegrin adult males to own a Gasser Pattern revolver, not necessarily one made by Gasser itself. In fact Leopold Gasser was faced with such heavy demand for the pistol internationally, that it could not fulfil all of the orders placed for it. This led the revolver's manufacturer to license out production to other companies and many Gasser Pattern pistols were then manufactured and sold by other European firms, most notably based out of Belgium and Spain. Even these licensed models did not satiate demand for the pistol and this, alongside a lax enforcement of intellectual property rights in Montenegro, led to many unlicensed local models of the pistol also being produced, with quality ranging from very good to outright dangerous to its user.

Subsequently, the weapon quickly became a status symbol for Montenegrin men and was commonly worn alongside traditional attire. Many Montenegrin immigrants that travelled to North America brought their Gasser pattern revolvers with them and at least two batches of several thousand pistols were smuggled into Mexico during the Mexican Revolution, leading to the Gasser revolver becoming widespread in the Americas. However, as the original reason for their mass production and the generation that grew around it faded, the pistol eventually lost its place as a status symbol and many were either given away or sold in the secondhand market.

=== Netherlands ===
Schutterij refers to a voluntary city guard or citizen militia in the medieval and early modern Netherlands, intended to protect the town or city from attack and act in case of revolt or fire. Their training grounds were often on open spaces within the city, near the city walls, but, when the weather did not allow, inside a church. They are mostly grouped according to their district and to the weapon that they used: bow, crossbow or gun. Together, its members are called a Schuttersgilde, which could be roughly translated as a "shooter's guild". It is now a title applied to ceremonial shooting clubs and to the country's Olympic rifle team.

=== New Zealand ===
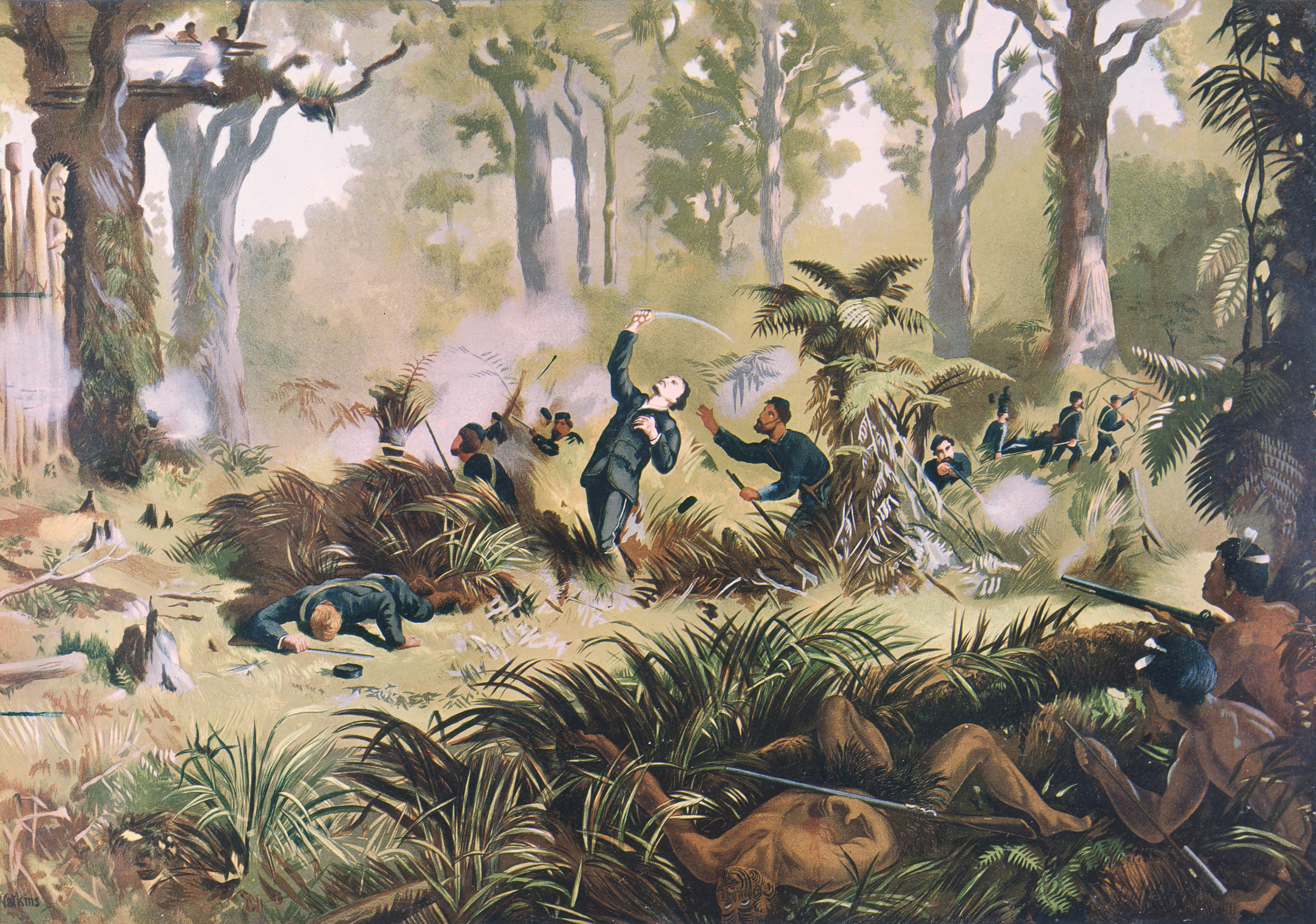
Member of the Armed Constabulary shot during the New Zealand Wars. The Constabulary was a law enforcement agency and a militia until it was reoriented into a police force in 1886.

From the Treaty of Waitangi in 1840 until 1844 small detachments of British Imperial troops based in New Zealand were the only military. This changed as a result of the Flagstaff War, with the colonial government passing a Militia Act on 25 March 1845. Militia units were formed in Auckland, Wellington, New Plymouth, and Nelson. Service in the militia was compulsory.

Many localized militia saw service, together with British Imperial troops, during the New Zealand Wars. In the late nineteenth century a system of local Volunteer militias evolved throughout the country. These were semi-trained but uniformed and administered by a small number of regular "Imperial" officers. The militia units were disbanded and reformed as the Territorial Army in 1911.

=== North Korea ===
The Worker-Peasant Red Guards is a North Korean paramilitary organization organized on a provincial/town/city/village level.

=== Norway ===
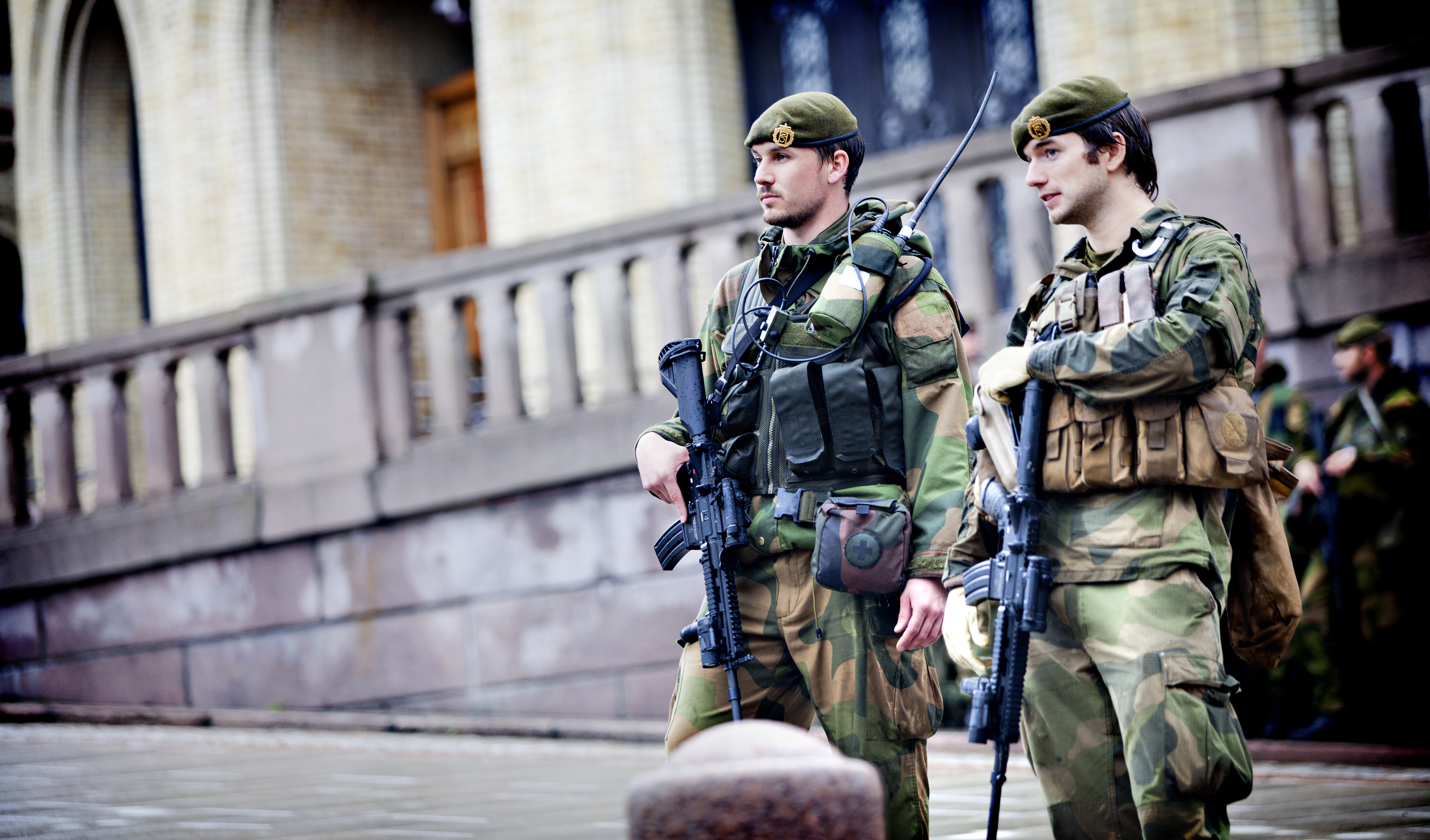
Members of the Norwegian Home Guard.

=== Pakistan ===
Militias have played an important role supporting Pakistan's Military since the Indo-Pakistani War of 1947 when Pakistan, with the support of militias, was able to gain control of parts of the region of Kashmir. Pakistan found the militias volunteering to participate in the Indo-Pakistani war of 1965 and the Indo-Pakistani war of 1971 quite useful as well.

Currently Pakistani citizens forming militias from the Khyber Pakhtunkhwa province are participating in the 'war on terror'.

=== Philippines ===
In the eighteenth century, the Philippines was a Spanish colony and the Spanish authorities sought to augment the strength of the regular military force of their colony by forming a number of militias. The most notable of these was the Luzon Grenadiers, which was of such exceptional quality that it was converted into a regular unit. Another noteworthy militia was the Royal University Militias, which was the forerunner of the University of Santo Tomas ROTC unit. The University of Santo Tomas along with the University of the Philippines Diliman and the University of the East have the best Reserve Officers' Training Corps programs in the country.

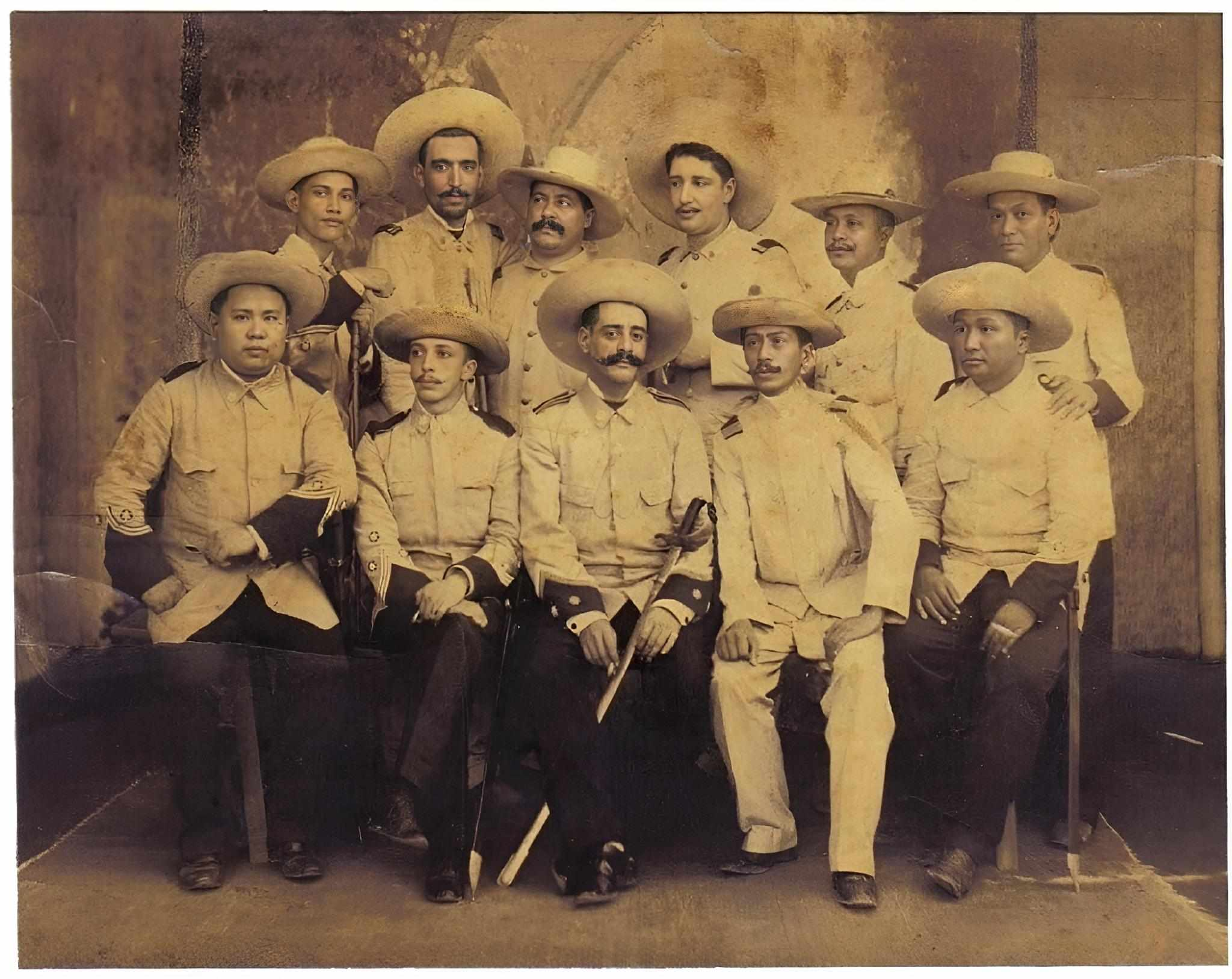
Militiamen of the Manila Loyal Volunteers Battalion

After the outbreak of the Revolution, Spain's governor-general in the Philippines authorized the formation of the Manila Loyal Volunteers Battalion.

During the Philippine-American War, the Sandatahan was the militia of the First Republic, and it distinguished itself in the Battle of Manila and the Second Battle of Caloocan.

When the Philippines Islands was an American colony, the Philippine National Guard was formed to fight in France during World War I as a unit of the American Expeditionary Force, but it never served overseas. The most famous Philippine guardsman was the first Filipino military pilot Leoncio R. Malinao, a 1920 U.P. graduate, who held the ranks of aviation cadet and lieutenant.

At the time when the Philippines was under Japanese military administration during the Pacific War, the Palaak was formed by the Japanese army. Also known as the Bamboo Army, because it was armed with bamboo spears, this militia existed even before the inauguration of the Second Republic. It was composed of all able-bodied men of District and Neighborhood Associations (Danas), from teenagers to sexagenarians. They were organized into platoons, companies, and battalions, and drilled along Japanese army lines. They served as spies and informers of the Japanese, they helped arrest guerrillas and performed guard duties. The Danas was created in August 1942 and when fully established, the government claimed that there were 124,000 Danas encompassing more than 1,500,000 Filipinos.

The Cold War caused the formation of various militias such as the Integrated Civilian Home Defense Forces, Bantáy Bayan (Civilian Volunteer Organization), and Citizen Armed Force Geographical Unit. There was also the Manila Crusaders for Peace and Democracy, and in Mindanao there were the Alamara, Alsa Masa, Davao Death Squad, Kuratong Baleleng, Lost Command, Magahat Bagani, Nakasaka, and Tagum Death Squad.

=== Portugal ===
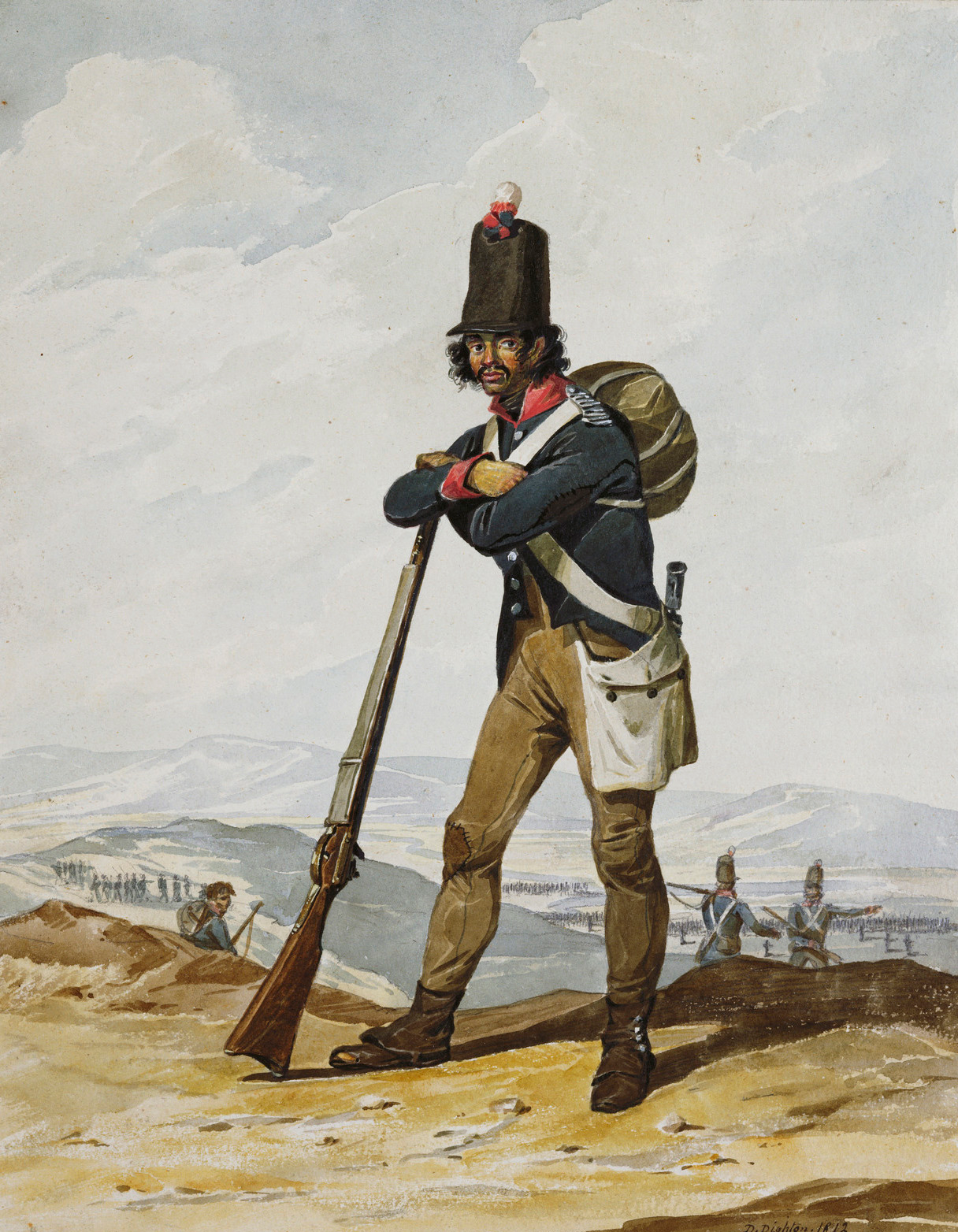
1812 illustration of a Portuguese militiaman

Portugal has a long tradition in the use of militias for national defense. Between the 12th and 16th centuries, the municipal militias – composed of spearmen, pikemen, horsemen, slingers, javelineers, archers, crossbowmen and later arquebusiers – constituted the main component of the Portuguese Royal Army, together with smaller military forces from the King, the military orders and the feudal lords.

After some failed previous attempts, in 1570 King Sebastian of Portugal created the Ordenanças, a centrally managed military territorial organization that would replace the municipal militias and became the basis of a national army. After 60 years of foreign domination (1580–1640), the Ordenanças were reorganized for the Portuguese Restoration War. The Portuguese Army was then organized in three lines, with the 2nd and 3rd being militia forces. The Ordenanças became the 3rd line and acted both as a territorial draft organization for the 1st and 2nd line troops and as a kind of home guard for local defense. The 2nd line was made of the auxiliary troops, also militia units with the role of regional defense. In the end of the 18th century, the auxiliary troops were renamed "Militias".

In the Peninsular War, the Militia regiments and the Ordenanças units had an important role in the defense of the country against the Napoleonic invader army. Still in the 19th century, the Militia units also had an important role in the Liberal Wars, with the majority of those troops fighting on the side of King Miguel. Besides the regular militias, a number of volunteer militia units were formed to fight on both sides of the war.

With the establishment of the constitutional regime, the old Militias and Ordenanças were replaced by a single national militia force, the National Guard. However, the National Guard revealed itself an ineffective and undisciplined force. Their units became highly politicized, being involved in a number of conspiracies and coups. The National Guard having less and less confidence from the authorities, became extinct in 1847, terminating a long tradition of national militias in Portugal.

During the 20th century, some experiments with militia type forces were made. From 1911 to 1926, the Portuguese Army was organized as a militia army. Also, in 1936, the Estado Novo regime created the Portuguese Legion as a political volunteer militia, dedicated to the fight against the enemies of country and of the social order. From World War II, the Portuguese Legion assumed the responsibility for civil defense, this becoming its main role during the Cold War, until its extinction in 1974.

=== Russia and the Soviet Union ===
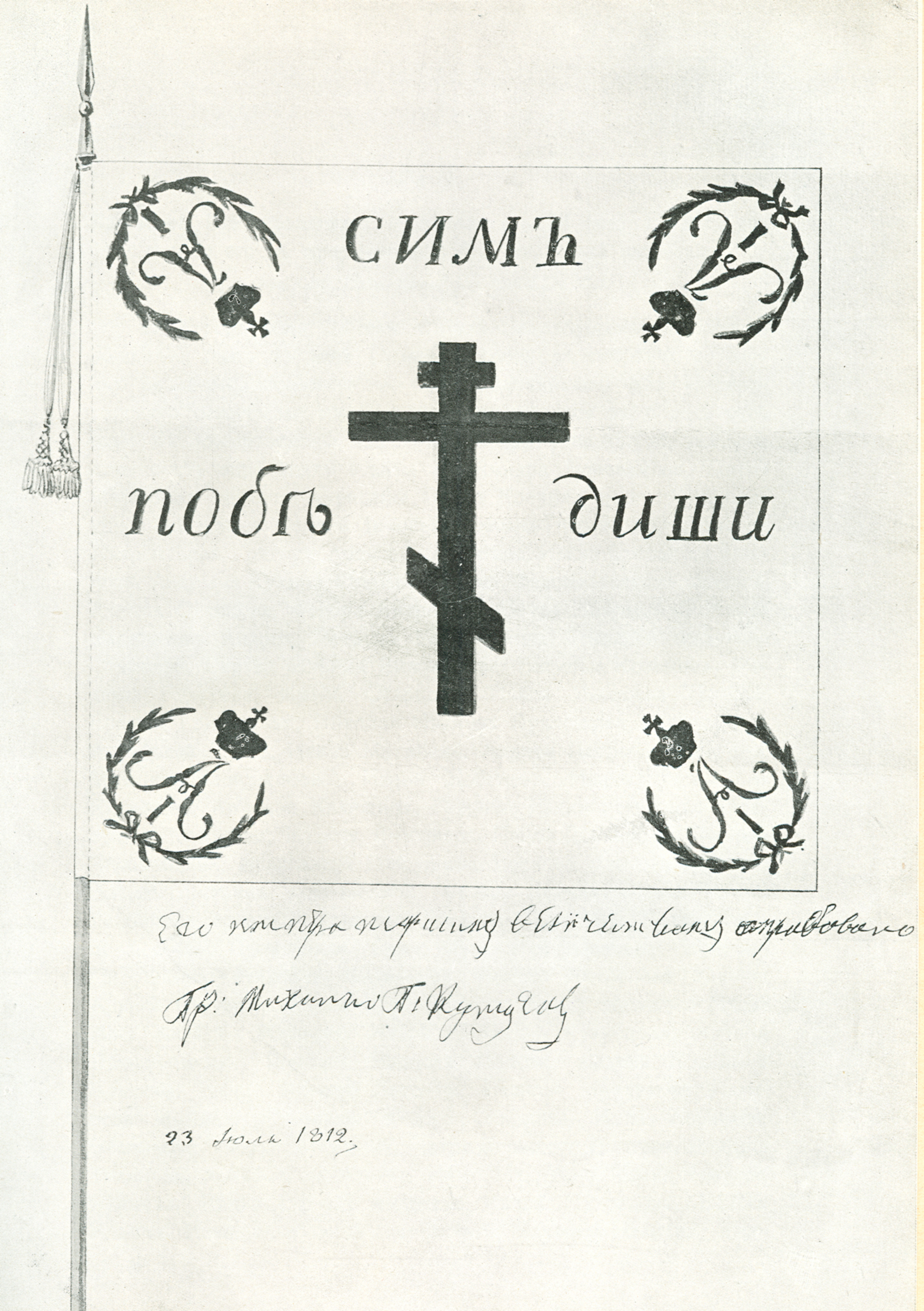
Banner of Saint Petersburg militia from Napoleon's invasion of Russia.

Neither the Russian Empire, nor the Soviet Union ever had an organised force that could be equated to a militia. Instead a form of organisation that predated the Russian state was used during national emergencies called Narodnoe Opolcheniye (People's Regimentation). More comparable to the English Fyrd, it was a popular voluntary joining of the local полк polk, or a regiment, though it had no regular established strength or officers, these usually elected from prominent local citizens. The Tsarist regime was particularly reluctant to arm and organise militia forces because of concern over a repetition of the Pugachev Serf Revolt of the late 18th century. Only in the face of the national emergency of 1812 was the raising of opolcheniye "cohorts" permitted. Numbering over 223,000, loosely trained and barely equipped, these enthusiastic volunteers nevertheless provided a useful reserve for the regular army.

Although these spontaneously created popular forces had participated in several major wars of the Russian Empire, including in combat, they were not obligated to serve for more than one year, and notably departed for home during the 1813 campaign in Germany. On only one occasion, during the military history of the Soviet Union, the Narodnoe Opolcheniye was incorporated into the regular forces of the Red Army, notably in Leningrad and Moscow.

The term Militsiya in Russia and former Communist Bloc nations was specifically used to refer to the civilian police force, and should not be confused with the conventional western definition of militia. The term, as used in this context, dated from post-revolutionary Russia in late 1917 and was intended to draw a distinction between the new Soviet law enforcement agencies and the disbanded Tsarist police. In some of these states, such as Ukraine, the "militia" were renamed as "police" while in other states (e.g. Belarus) the title remains unchanged. In Russia itself the "militia' became "police" (in Russian: Полиция, Politsiya) in March 2011.

=== Spain ===
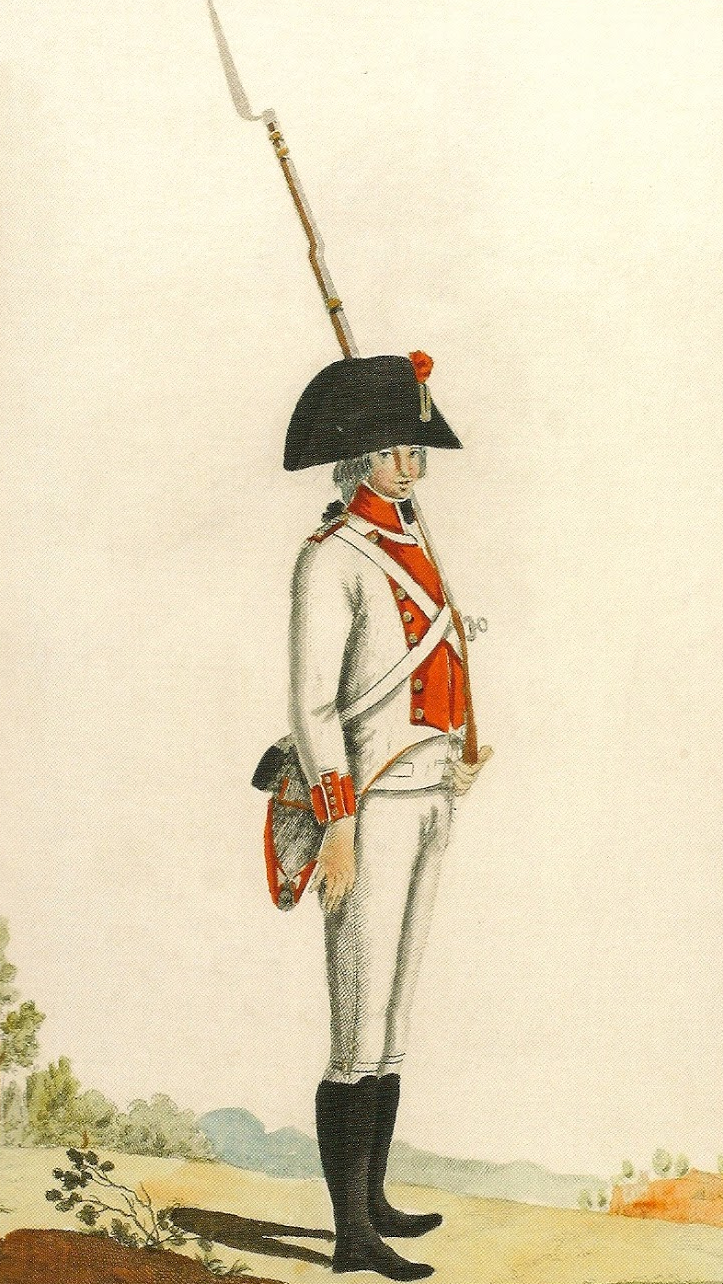
Illustration of a Spanish militiaman in 1806

Spain had the National Militia, Provincial Militia, Urban Militia, and University Militias.

=== Sri Lanka ===
The first militias formed in Sri Lanka were by Lankan Kings, who raised militia armies for their military campaigns both within and outside the island. This was due to the reason that the Kings never maintained a standing army instead had a Royal Guard during peacetime and formed a militia in wartime.

When the Portuguese who were the first colonial power to dominate the island raised local militias under the command of local leaders known as Mudaliyars. These militias took part in the many Portuguese campaigns against the Lankan Kings. The Dutch continued to employ these militias but due to their unreliability tended to favor employing Swiss and Malay mercenaries in their campaigns in the island.

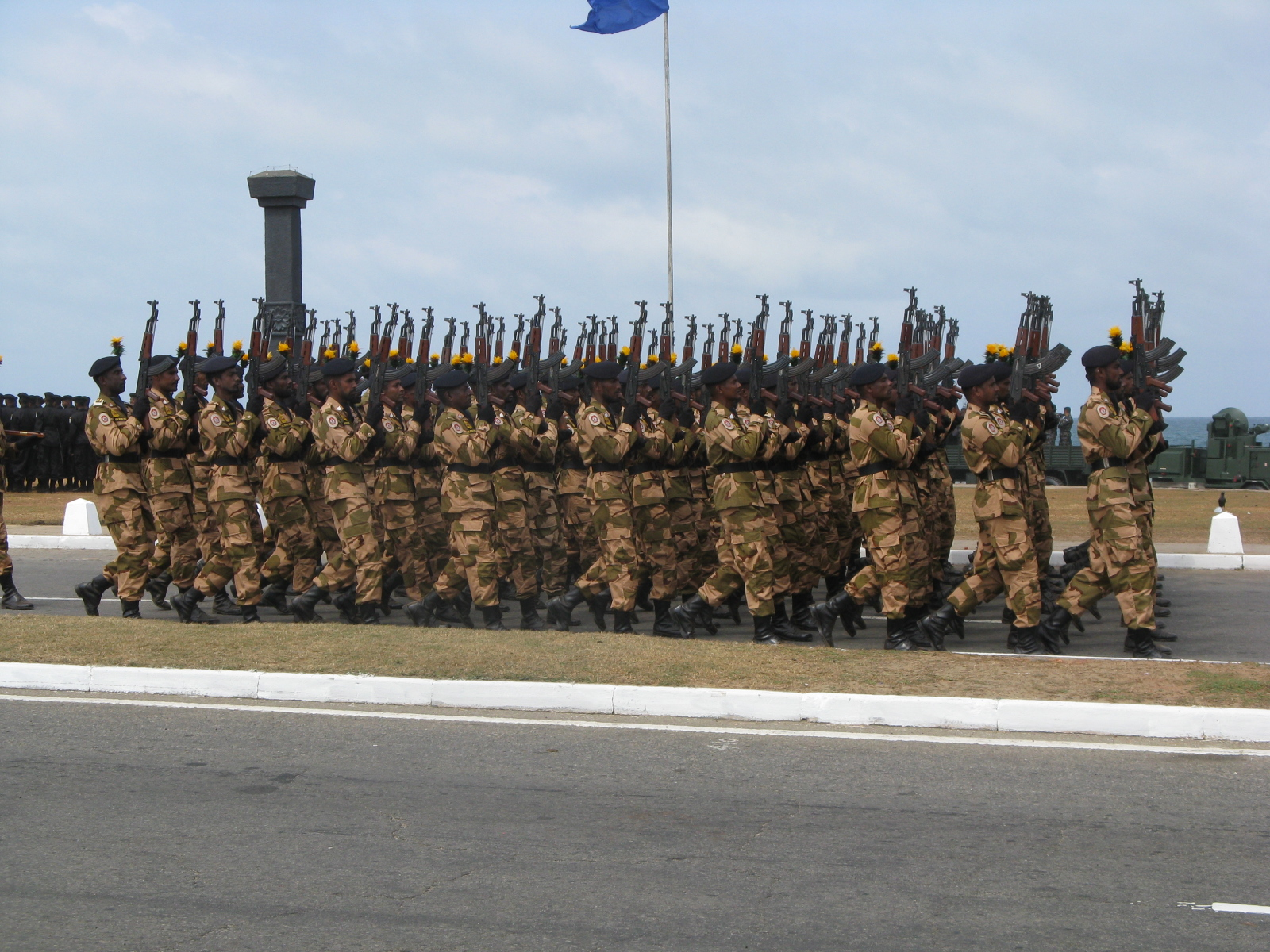
The Sri Lanka Civil Security Force is a paramilitary militia tasked to serve as an auxiliary to the Sri Lanka Police.

The British Empire then ousted the Dutch from the coastal areas of the country, and sought to conquer the independent Kandyan Kingdom. In 1802, the British became the first foreign power to raise a regular unit of Sinhalese with British officers, which was named the 2nd Ceylon Regiment, also known as the Sepoy Corps. It fought alongside British troops in the Kandyan wars. After the Matale Rebellion led by Puran Appu in 1848, in which a number of Sinhalese recruits defected to the side of the rebels, the recruitment of Sinhalese to the British forces was temporarily halted and the Ceylon Regiments disbanded.

In 1861, the Ceylon Light Infantry Volunteers were raised as a militia, but soon became a military reserve force. This became the Ceylon Defence Force in 1910 and consisted of militia units. These were the Colombo Town Guard and the Town Guard Artillery formed during the two world wars.

With the escalation of the Sri Lankan Civil War, local villagers under threat of attack were formed into localized militia to protect their families and homes. According to the Sri Lankan Military these militias were formed after "massacres done by the LTTE" and in the early 1990s they were reformed as the Sri Lankan Home Guard. In 2007 the Home Guard became the Sri Lanka Civil Security Force. In 2008, the government called for the formation of nearly 15,000 civil defence committees at the village level for additional protection.

In 2004, the Liberation Tigers of Tamil Eelam claimed have establish a voluntary "Tamil Eelam auxiliary force". According to the LTTE's then head of police, the force was to be assigned to tasks such as rehabilitation, construction, forest conservation and agriculture, but would also be used to battle the Sri Lankan military if the need arose. In early 2009 it ceased to exist with the military defeat of the LTTE at the hands of the Sri Lanka Armed Forces.

=== Sudan ===
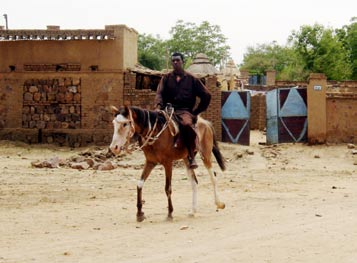
A mounted Janjaweed militiaman. The Janjaweed are a militia operating in western Sudan and eastern Chad.

The Janjaweed militia consists of armed Arab Muslims fighting for the government in Khartoum against non-Arab Muslim "rebels". They are active in the Darfur region of western Sudan and also in eastern Chad. According to Human Rights Watch these partisans are responsible for abuses including war crimes, crimes against humanity and ethnic cleansing.

=== Sweden ===
As of 2012, the Swedish Home Guard consists of 22,000 organized into 40 light infantry battalions of 300–700 Guardsmen. These battalions are then organised into companies, usually one for every municipality. The main task of the battalions is to guard vital military and civilian installations throughout the country.

In 2001, the Rapid Response units numbered around 5,000 soldiers of the total of 42,000. As of 2014, the majority of the force, 17,000 out of 22,000 soldiers will be in Rapid Response units. The decrease in number of troops comes with an equal increase in quality and modern equipment. These units are motorized and are ready to be mobilized more often, than other Home Guard units. Rapid response units have more combat tasks compared to the rest of the Home Guard, including escort duties. Some battalions located near the coast also have marine companies equipped with Combat Boat 90. A few battalions have recently set up 'specialized' companies to evaluate the possibility to add new abilities to the Home Guard. These are at the time of writing eight reconnaissance/intelligence companies, four CBRN-platoons, a movcon platoon, an engineer platoon, and a military police unit.

=== Switzerland ===
One of the best known and ancient militias is the Swiss Armed Forces. Switzerland has long maintained, proportionally, the second largest military force in the world, with about half the proportional amount of reserve forces of the Israel Defense Forces, a militia of some 33% of the total population. The "militia principle" of public duties is central to Swiss political culture and not limited to military issues. For example, in most municipalities it is common to serve as a conscript fire fighter in the Compulsory Fire Department.

Article 58.1 of the April 18, 1999, Federal Constitution of the Swiss Confederation (official, French version) provides that "Switzerland has an army. It is primarily organised according to the principle of a militia." However, under the country's militia system, professional soldiers constitute about 5 percent of military personnel. In 1995, the number of soldiers was reduced to 400,000 (including reservists, amounting to some 5.6% of the population) in 2004, to 200,000 (including 80,000 reservists, or 2.5% of the population) and again in 2022, to 150,000 (including 50,000 reservists). However, the Swiss Militia continues to consist of most of the adult male population (with voluntary participation by women) who are usually issued an assault rifle which they can keep at home or store in a central arsenal and most of them have to periodically engage in combat and marksmanship training. The militia clauses of the Swiss Federal Constitution are contained in Art. 59, where it is referred to as "military service" (German: Militärdienst; French: service militaire; Italian: servizio militare; Romansh: servetsch militar).

=== Syria ===
The Syrian National Defense Force was formed out of pro-government militias. They receive their salaries and their military equipment from the government and as of 2013 numbers around 100,000. The force acts in an infantry role, directly fighting against rebels on the ground and running counter-insurgency operations in coordination with the army which provides them with logistical and artillery support. Unlike the Syrian Army, NDF soldiers are allowed to take loot from battlefields, which can then be sold on for extra money.

=== United States ===
The history of militia in the United States dates from the colonial era, such as in the American Revolutionary War. Based on the English system, colonial militias were drawn from the body of adult male citizens of a community, town, or local region. Because there was no standing English Army before the English Civil War, and subsequently the English Army and later the British Army had few regulars garrisoning North America, colonial militia served a vital role in local conflicts, particularly in the French and Indian Wars. Before shooting began in the American War of Independence, American revolutionaries took control of the militia system, reinvigorating training and excluding men with Loyalist inclinations. Regulation of the militia was codified by the Second Continental Congress with the Articles of Confederation. The revolutionaries also created a full-time regular army—the Continental Army—but, because of manpower shortages, the militia provided short-term support to the regulars in the field throughout the war.

In colonial era Anglo-American usage, militia service was distinguished from military service in that the latter was normally a commitment for a fixed period of time of at least a year, for a salary, whereas militia was only to meet a threat, or prepare to meet a threat, for periods of time expected to be short. Militia persons were normally expected to provide their own weapons, equipment, or supplies, although they may later be compensated for losses or expenditures. A related concept is the jury, which can be regarded as a specialized form of militia convened to render a verdict in a court proceeding (known as a petit jury or trial jury) or to investigate a public matter and render a presentment or indictment (grand jury).

With the Constitutional Convention of 1787 and Article 1 Section 8 of the United States Constitution, control of the army and the power to direct the militia of the states was concurrently delegated to the federal Congress. The Militia Clauses gave Congress authority for "organizing, arming, and disciplining" the militia, and "governing such Part of them as may be employed in the Service of the United States", and the States retained authority to appoint officers and to impose the training specified by Congress. Proponents describe a key element in the concept of "militia" was that to be "genuine" it not be a "select militia", composed of an unrepresentative subset of the population. This was an argument presented in the ratification debates.

The first legislation on the subject was the Militia Act of 1792 which provided, in part:

That each and every free able-bodied white male citizen of the respective States, resident therein, who is or shall be of age of eighteen years, and under the age of forty-five years (except as is herein after excepted) shall severally and respectively be enrolled in the militia,... every citizen, so enrolled and notified, shall, within six months thereafter, provide himself with a good musket or firelock.

Prior to the War of Independence, the officers of militia units were commissioned by the royal governors. During the war, they were commissioned either by the legislature or the chief executive of the state. After the war, commissions were typically granted by the state's chief executive. Militias did not operate independently of the state governments but were under the command of the civil government just like the regular military forces. Twenty-four of the current US states maintain state defense forces in the form of a constitutional militia in addition to the National Guard which is shared with the US government. These states include Alabama, Alaska, California, Connecticut, Georgia, Illinois, Indiana, Louisiana, Maryland, Massachusetts, Michigan, Missouri, New Jersey, New Mexico, New York, Ohio, Oklahoma, Oregon, South Carolina, Tennessee, Texas, Washington, Vermont, and Virginia. In addition, the Territory of Puerto Rico has a defense force.

==== 19th century ====
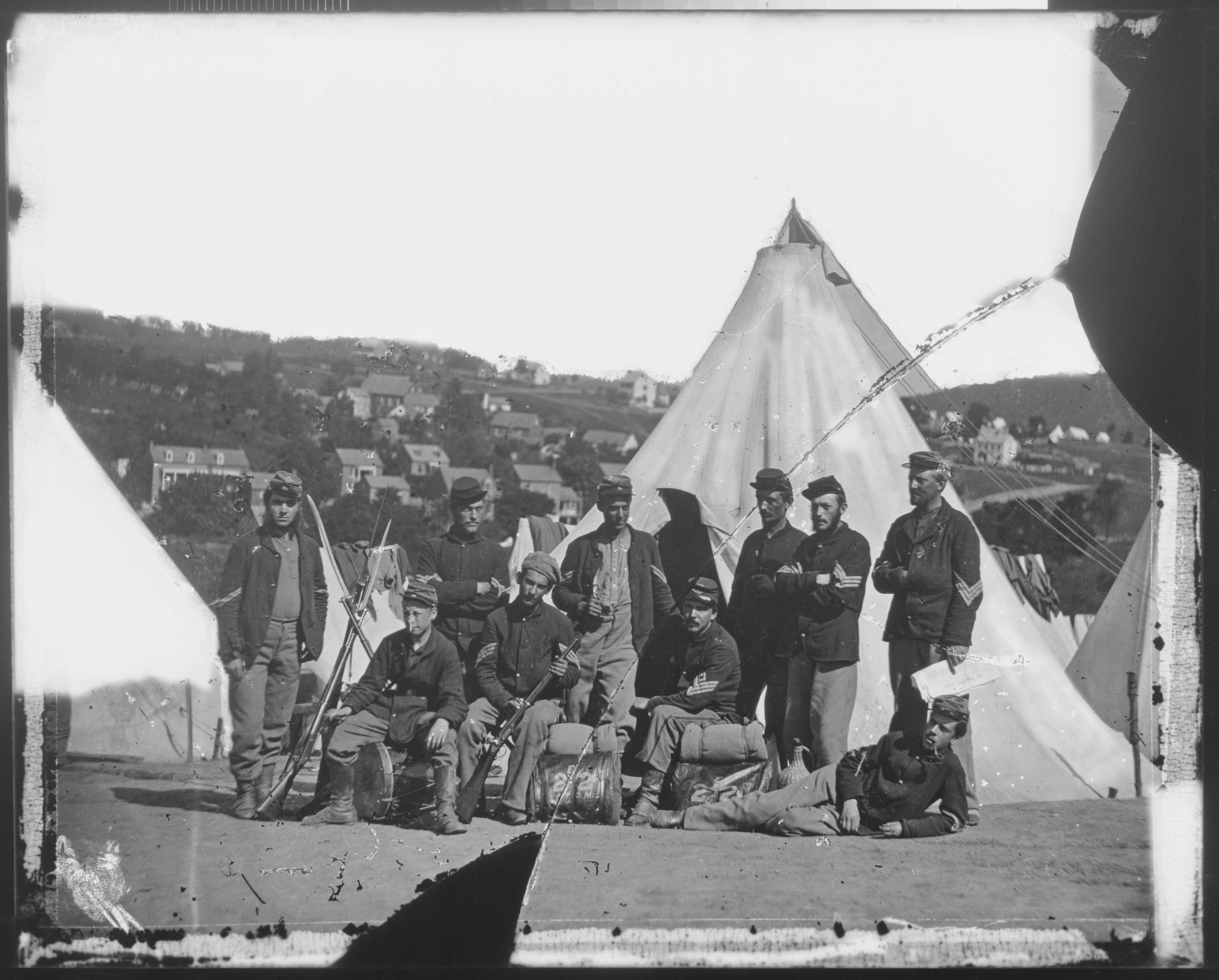
Uniformed American militiamen during the American Civil War.

During the nineteenth century, each of the states maintained its militia differently, some more than others. American militia saw action in the various Indian Wars, the War of 1812, the American Civil War, and the Spanish–American War. Sometimes militia units were found to be unprepared, ill-supplied, and unwilling. Prior to the Civil War, militia units were sometimes used by southern states for slave control. Formed in 1860, Republican Party-affiliated Wide Awakes clubs were quick to take action to defend persons against southern slave-hunters. In California, the militia carried out campaigns against bandits and against the Indians at the direction of its Governor between 1850 and 1866. During Reconstruction after the Civil War, Republican state governments had militias composed almost entirely of freed slaves and populist whites. Their deployment to maintain order in the former Confederate states caused increased resentment among many Southern whites.

After the American Civil War, secret groups like the Ku Klux Klan and Knights of the White Camellia arose quickly across the South, reaching a peak in the late 1860s. Even more significant in terms of effect were private militias: paramilitary organizations that formed starting in 1874, including the White League in Louisiana, which quickly formed chapters in other states; the Red Shirts in Mississippi in 1875, and with force in South Carolina and North Carolina; and other "white line" militias and rifle clubs.

In contrast to the KKK, these paramilitary organizations were open; members were often well known in their communities. Nevertheless, they used force, intimidation, and violence, including murder, to push out Republican officeholders, break up organizing, and suppress freedmen's voting and civil rights. The paramilitary groups were described as "the military arm of the Democratic Party" and were instrumental in helping secure Democratic victories in the South in the elections of 1876.

==== 20th century ====
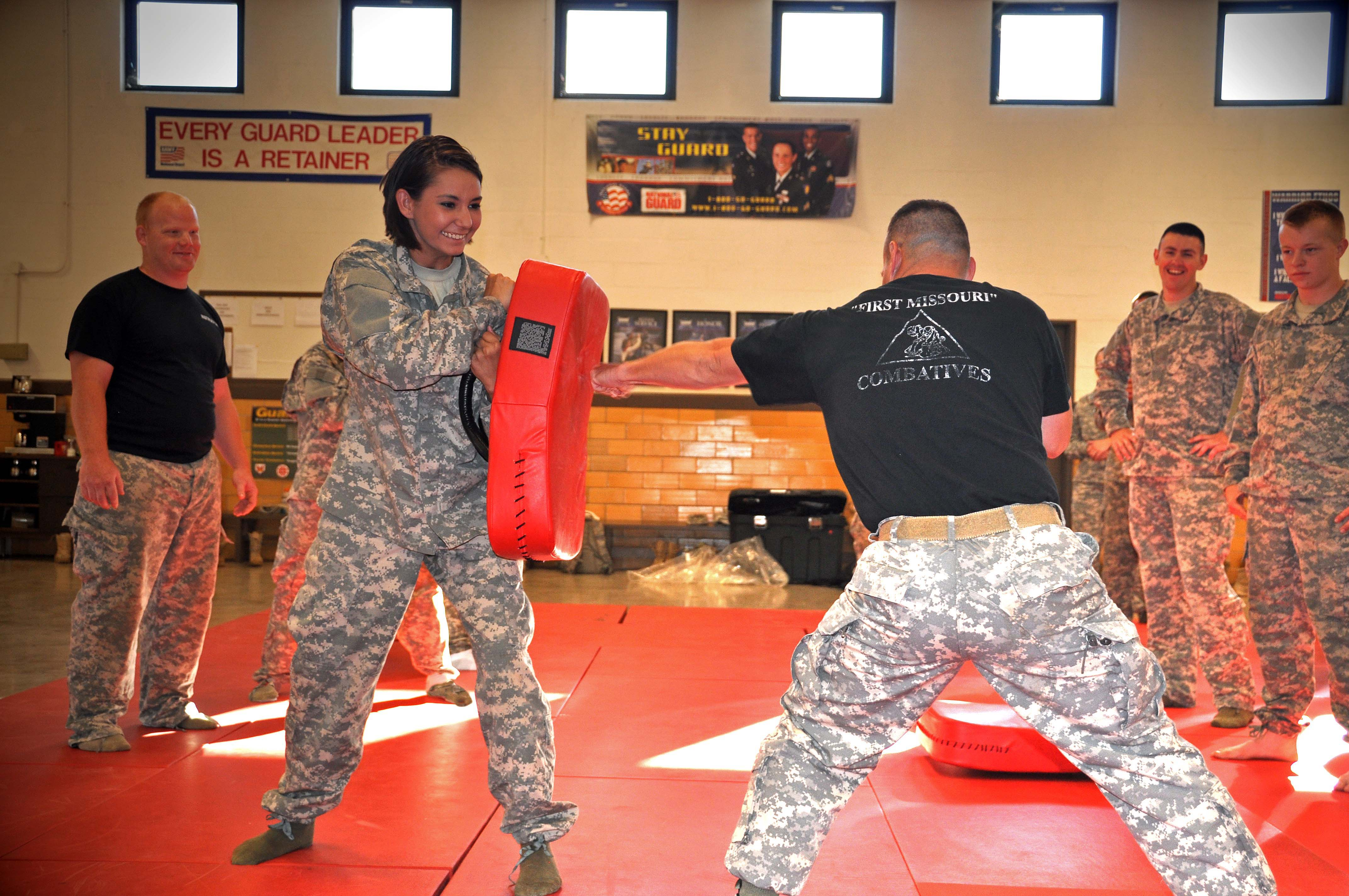
Members of the United States National Guard undergoing self-defense training. The force was created in 1903 as an organized militia.

The Militia Act of 1903 divided what had been the militia into what it termed the "organized" militia, created from portions of the former state guards to become state National Guard units, and the "unorganized" militia consisting of all males from ages 17 to 45, with the exception of certain officials and others, which is codified in 10 U.S.C. § 311. Some states, such as Texas, California, and Ohio, created separate state defense forces for assistance in local emergencies. Congress later established a system of "dual enlistment" for the National Guard, so that anyone who enlisted in the National Guard also enlisted in the U.S. Army. When the U.S. Air Force was established as an independent service in 1947, the National Guard was further divided into the Army National Guard and the Air National Guard. Under this construct, the 1933 defense act's "dual enlistment" facet was further amended so that enlisted soldiers and commissioned officers in the Army National Guard were also enlisted or commissioned in the Reserve Component of the U.S. Army. Enlisted airmen and commissioned officers in the Air National Guard were also enlisted or commissioned in the Air Reserve Component (ARC) of the U.S. Air Force.

The 20th century saw the rise of militia organizations in the United States, these private militias often have an anti-government outlook and are not under the civil authority of the states. Privately organized citizen militia-related groups blossomed in the mid-1990s. Many militia groups are based on religious or political extremism and some are regarded as hate groups.

==== 21st century ====
In the 2008 decision of the Supreme Court, in District of Columbia v. Heller, the de jure definition of "militia" as used in United States jurisprudence was discussed. The Court's opinion made explicit, in its obiter dicta, that the term "militia", as used in colonial times in this originalist decision, included both the federally organized militia and the citizen-organized militias of the several States: "... the 'militia' in colonial America consisted of a subset of 'the people'—those who were male, able-bodied, and within a certain age range" (7)... Although the militia consists of all able-bodied men, the federally-organized militia may consist of a subset of them"(23).

===== Active militias =====
- National Guard
- State defense forces

==== Texas ====
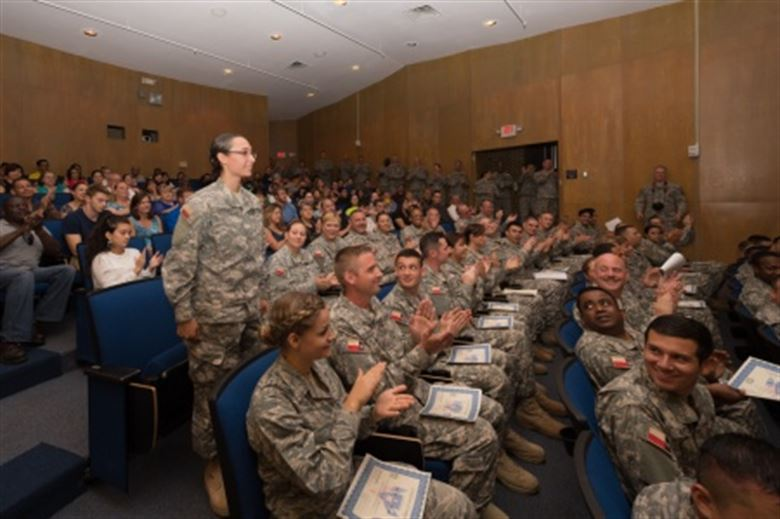
Basic orientation for the Texas State Guard. The Guard is a state defense force, military units under the sole authority of the state government.

The most important previous activity of the Texas Militia was the Texas Revolution in 1836. Texans declared independence from Mexico while they were defeated during the Battle of the Alamo, in March 1836. On April 21, 1836, led by Sam Houston, the Militia attacked the Mexican Army at their camp, in the Battle of San Jacinto near the present city of Houston. Following the war, some militia units reorganized into what was later to be known as the Texas Rangers, which was a private, volunteer effort for several years before becoming an official organization. After Texas joined the Union of the United States in 1845, Texas militia units participated in the Mexican–American War.

In 1861 Texas joined the other Confederate States in seceding from the Union, and Texas militias played a role in the American Civil War until it ended in 1865. Texas militiamen joined Theodore Roosevelt's Rough Riders, a volunteer militia, and fought with him during the Spanish–American War in 1898. Some of the training of the Rough Riders took place in San Pedro Park, in the north-central part of San Antonio near the present site of San Antonio College. When a muster of the Militia proposed to train there on April 19, 1994, they were threatened with arrest, even though the charter of San Pedro Park forbids exclusion of activities of that kind. This threat led to a change in the meeting site. Like many other American states, Texas maintains a recognized State Militia, the Texas State Guard.

=== Vietnam ===
The Militia and Self-Defence Force is a part of Vietnam People's Armed Forces. The militia organized in communes, wards and townships and is put under commune-level military commands.

The Self-Defence Militia has two branches: Dân quân tự vệ nòng cốt (Core Self-Defence Militia) and Dân quân tự vệ rộng rãi (General Self-Defence Militia). The term of service in the Core Militia is 4 years.

=== SFR Yugoslavia ===
Beside the federal Yugoslav People's Army, each constituent republic of the former SFR Yugoslavia had its own Territorial Defense Forces. The Non-Aligned Yugoslavia was concerned about eventual aggression from any of the superpowers, especially by the Warsaw Pact after the Prague Spring, so the Territorial Defense Forces were formed as an integral part of the total war military doctrine called Total National Defense. Those forces corresponded to military reserve forces, paramilitary or militia, the latter, in the military meaning of the term (like military formation). It should not be confused with the Yugoslav Militia – Milicija which was a term for a police.

== See also ==
- Condottieri
- Gendarmerie
- Party militia
- Milicja Obywatelska
- National Bolivarian Militia of Venezuela
- Voluntary Militia for National Security
- Violent non-state actor
