= Tenth grade =

Tenth post-kindergarten year of school education in some school systems

Tenth grade (also 10th grade or Grade 10) is the tenth year of formal or compulsory education. It is typically the first year of high school. In some places, 10th grade is the second year of high school. In many parts of the world, students in tenth grade are usually 15 to 16 years of age.

Preceded by Ninth grade	Tenth grade age 15-16	Succeeded by Eleventh grade

== Australia ==
In the Australian states, Year 10 is the fourth year of a student's high school education. However, in the Northern Territory and other states, it is the first year of senior school, which occurs after high school. While in contrast, in most South Australia public schools, it is the third year of high school.

== Brazil ==
In Brazil, the tenth grade is the "primeiro ano do ensino médio", meaning "first grade of high school". Students tend to be 15 years old.

== Canada ==
In Canada, the equivalent is Grade 10.

== Finland ==
In Finland, tenth grade is usually known as the first year of high School ("Lukio" in Finnish and "Gymnasiet" in Swedish). The tenth grade may also refer to an extra year of primary school ("kymppiluokka" in Finnish, which literally translates to "tenth grade"). This extra year of primary school is for those without a post-primary school study position or who need some more time to decide on their future.

== Kazakhstan ==
In Kazakhstan, Grade 10 (10-сынып) is the first year of upper (senior) secondary school (жоғары орта білім). Students generally begin it at age 15–16. After Grade 9, they may choose to continue in general secondary education (жалпы орта білім) (Grades 10–11) or pursue a vocational/technical track.

== New Zealand ==
In New Zealand, Year 11 is the equivalent of tenth grade, with students aged 15 or 16 during the years. It is the third year of secondary school and the eleventh year of compulsory education. Year 11 is also the first year of the National Certificate of Educational Achievement (NCEA), the main national qualification for secondary school students in New Zealand. Students in Year 11 study English (or Te Reo Māori), mathematics, and a minimum of four elective subjects with a science subject highly recommended. Some schools also offer NCEA alternatives, like the International General Certificate of Secondary Education.

== Philippines ==
In the Philippines, Grade 10 or Senior Year (Filipino: Ikasampung Baitang), is the last year of Junior High School and the fourth year of High School curriculum. Students enrolled in Grade 10 are usually 15–16 years old. Student can also start as young age education usually on female students than male students at 1-15 years old. This is where they prepare to enter Senior High School.

It was formerly named as 4th Year or Year IV (Filipino: Ika-apat na Taon) and also the last year of the High School (Filipino: Mataas na Paaralan) stage and basic compulsory education in the country until the change to Grade 10 on June 1, 2015 upon the start of school year 2015-2016 due to the implementation process of the K-12 curriculum from May 20, 2008 and became effective on April 24, 2012 making the level now third to the last in High School under the current curriculum.

The following core or "major" subjects are taken during this grade:

- Trigonometry
- Physics
- Filipino subject with El filibusterismo
- English
- Philippine Contemporary Issues (equivalent of Political Studies).

The following are taken as curricular "minor" subjects:

- Values education
- World literature (may be taken alongside English)
- Music, Arts, Physical Education and Health
- Computer
- Technology and Livelihood Education

There is also the Citizen Army Training, a basic military education and training program similar to the Reserve Officers' Training Corps for college students. As in conscription and ROTC, the program is not mandatory.

== United Kingdom ==
=== England and Wales ===
For education in England and Wales, this is known as Year 11. General education certificates will be awarded if the pupils sit for the end-of-year examinations, called GCSEs. In Year 11, students take their GCSEs. With grades ranging from 9 to 1, and the grade below 1 being U, these exams show proficiency in a range of subjects. Results of at least five 5 grades are considered a pass and many employers require their staff to have at least 5s in GCSE, including English and Maths. GCSEs are taken in May and June. Pupils may then sit 'A' Levels. A new English Baccalaureate has been introduced; this is awarded to students who achieve a 9 to 5 in five subjects: English (literature and language), maths, science (either combined science (2 GCSEs) or three from physics, chemistry, biology and computer science), a humanities subject (history or geography) and a modern or ancient language.

== United States ==
The tenth grade is typically the second year of high school, called sophomore year.

In the U.S. curriculum for social studies, tenth grade students are taught recent world history or American history. In some districts, Advanced Placement coursework, such as geography, European history, Global studies, or United States History, are offered.

== See also ==
- Educational stage
- Ninth grade
- Eleventh grade
- Twelfth grade
- Year Ten
- Senior secondary education
