= Reserve Officers' Training Corps (disambiguation) =

Reserve Officers' Training Corps is a college-based program for training commissioned officers of the United States armed forces.

Reserve Officers' Training Corps may also refer to a similar program in other countries:

- Reserve Officers' Training Corps (Philippines)
- Reserve Officers' Training Corps (South Korea)
- Reserve Officers' Training Corps (Taiwan)

== Other uses ==
- Air Force Reserve Officer Training Corps, the US Air Force component of the ROTC
- Army Reserve Officers' Training Corps, the US Army component of the ROTC
- Naval Reserve Officers Training Corps, the US Navy and US Marine Corps component of the ROTC
- Junior Reserve Officers' Training Corps, an affiliate program in US high schools

== See also ==
- University Officers' Training Corps, the British Army equivalent of Army ROTC
- University Air Squadron, the Royal Air Force equivalent of Air Force ROTC
- University Royal Naval Unit, the Royal Navy equivalent of Naval ROTC
- Reserve Officer Training in Russia
