= National Service Reserve Corps =

Program in the Philippines

- Panlaáng Hukbo ng Pambansang Paglilingkod
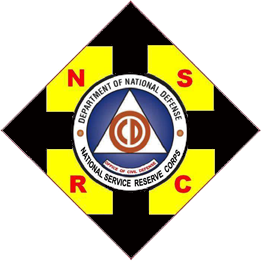
- Emblem of the National Service Reserve Corps

Agency overview
- Formed: June 12, 2012
- Jurisdiction: Government of the Philippines
- Headquarters: 3/F Armed Forces of the Philippines Reserve Command, Camp Aguinaldo, Quezon City, Philippines
- Employees: 1,000,000
- Agency executive: Juanito W. Dalmas, National Director
- Parent agency: Office of Civil Defense

The National Service Reserve Corps (NSRC; Filipino: Panlaáng Hukbo ng Pambansang Paglilingkod) is a unit composed of graduates of the Civic Welfare Training Service (CWTS) and Literacy Training Service (LTS) components of the National Service Training Program, a civic education and defense preparedness program in the Philippines. Members of this corps may be tapped by the state for literacy and civic welfare activities. In 2010 the NSRC was mandated to be accredited and mobilized for the delivery of disaster risk reduction programs and activities.

== History ==
The NSRC was created by virtue of Republic Act 9163, known as the National Service Training Program or NSTP Act of 2001. The NSTP Act mandated that all graduates of the non-ROTC (Reserve Officers' Training Corps) component of the NSTP, namely CWTS and LTS, shall constitute the National Service Reserve Corps. ROTC graduates on the other hand, shall become reservists of the Armed Forces of the Philippines. The NSTP Law made ROTC a non-compulsory training component at the tertiary level of education. Furthermore, it made NSTP mandatory for all students in all higher education institutions (HEIs) and technical-vocational educational training institutions (TVETs) for courses of two or more years. Students have the freedom to choose among the three NSTP components.

Since the enactment of the NSTP Law in 2001 until 2011 - a period of 10 years, the NSRC was never implemented despite the issuance of a joint memorandum from the Department of National Defense, Commission on Higher Education (CHED) and the Technical Education and Skills Development Authority (TESDA) for its implementation. In May 2010, a new law was enacted - RA 10121. Known as the Philippine Disaster Risk Reduction and Management Act of 2010, this law mandated that the National Service Reserve Corps be accredited and mobilized for the delivery of disaster risk reduction programs and activities.

== Categories ==
The NSRC units are classified into two categories:

- Community-Based NSRC Reservists Units (CBNRUs). These are units organized at the barangay, municipal, city and provincial level. Graduates of the CWTS and LTS components of NSTP who are residents of these respective localities constitute the membership of the CBNRUs.
- School-Based NSRC Reservists Units (SBNRUs). These units are organized by higher education institutions under CHED and technical-vocational education and training institutions under TESDA. Its membership is composed of graduates of the CWTS and LTS who are still happen to be enrolled in the said schools.

== Leadership ==
- Juanito W. Dalmas - Brigadier General, NSRC National Director, June 2012 to June 2016
- Francis Leonida - Colonel, NSRC Deputy National Director
- Ramon G. Santos - Brigadier General, NSRC Basulta Provincial Director
- Jeff D. L. Tamayo - Colonel, R13-1001st UPHSD NSRC Group Leader
- Floro I. Verzosa - Officer 5, NSRC Group Training Officer
- Neil Allan C. De Leon - Officer 4, NSRC Training Officer
- Mary Rose J. Amar - Officer 3, NSRC Training Officer
- Jun B. Palmon - Officer 2, NSRC Training Officer

== Notable activated units ==
- University of Perpetual Help System DALTA - Las Pinas Campus - the first NSRC in the National Capital Region activated under then-Undersecretary Benito T. Ramos of the Office of Civil Defense and Executive Director of the NDRRMC. They were designated as the R13-1001st (UPHSD) NSRC Group.
- Basilan NSRC Provincial Directorate Office and the R14–1001st (Basilan) NSRC GROUP
- Sulu NSRC Provincial Directorate Office and the R14–1002nd (Sulu) NSRC GROUP
- Tawi-Tawi NSRC Provincial Directorate Office and the R14–1003rd (Tawi-Tawi) NSRC GROUP
- R13-1st NSRC Disaster Response Training Group, the first batch of training instructors and responders under the directive of the NSRC National Director

== See also ==
- National Service Training Program
- Office of Civil Defense
- Department of National Defense
