= Literacy in the Philippines =

Literacy in the Philippines or Basic Literacy refers as the ability of a person to read, write and compute and Functional Literacy refers to the ability of a person to read write, compute, and comprehend, based on PSA Board Resolution No. 13 Series of 2024.

In the Philippines, the literacy rate is determined by the Philippine Statistics Authority (PSA) through the Functional Literacy, Education, and Mass Media Survey (FLEMMS).

The result of the FLEMMS in 2024 shows that the Basic Literacy Rate for 5 Years Old and Over is 90% while the Functional Literacy Rate of those 10 to 64 Years Old is 70.8% The 2024 FLEMMS is the seventh (7th) PSA Survey.

The Philippine Government lead agency for literacy is the Department of Education (DepEd). The Literacy Coordinating Council (LCC) is an inter-agency body that is administratively attached to DepEd.

The Commission on Higher Education, through the issuance of memorandum, supports higher education institutions to include literacy programs in extension services.

== History ==
=== Pre-colonial period (900 AD to 1565) ===
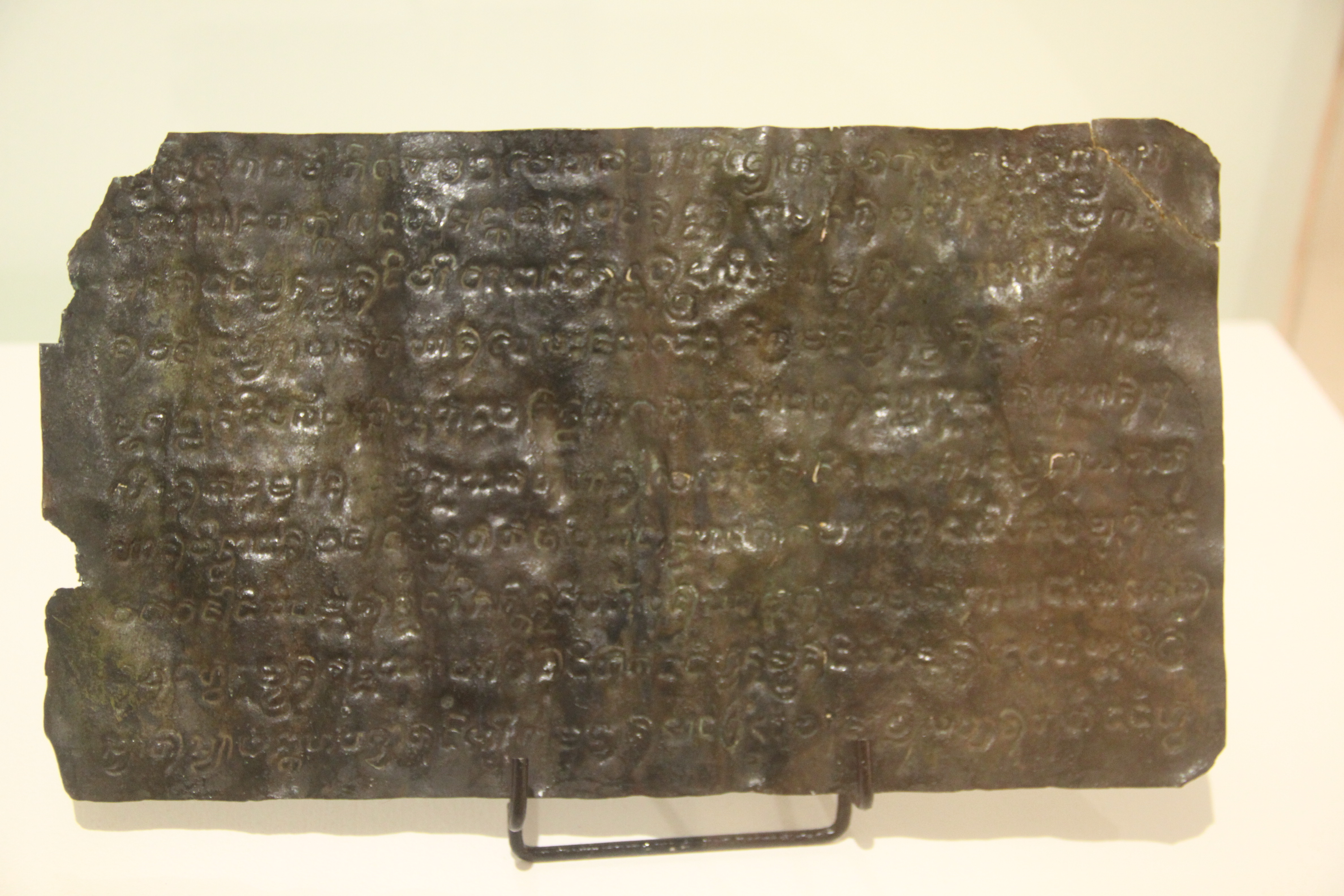
Laguna Copperplate Inscription.

In pre-colonial Philippines, the communities pass their stories, songs, poetry, dances, medicinal practices and advice regarding all sorts of community life issues passed from generation to generation, primarily through oral tradition. However, communities already developed writing systems and used Philippine scripts such as baybayin and other syllabaries. The Laguna Copperplate Inscription is the earliest-known, extant, calendar-dated document found within the Philippines

Early chroniclers, who came during the first Spanish expeditions to the islands noted the proficiency of some of the natives, especially the chieftain and local kings, in Sanskrit, Old Javanese, Old Malay, and several other languages.

=== Colonial period ===
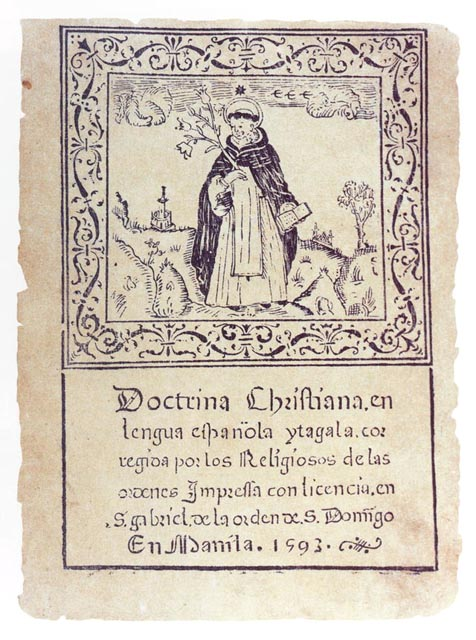
Cover of Doctrina Christiana.

During the Spanish colonization of the Philippines, the first book printed in the Philippines was printed in 1590. It was a Chinese language version of Doctrina Christiana. Spanish and Tagalog versions, in both Latin script and the locally used baybayin script, were later printed in 1593.

=== Contemporary period ===
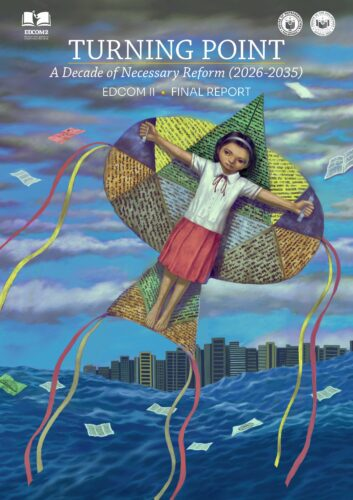
Cover of EDCOM II Final Report.

On November 25, 1991, the Literacy Coordinating Council was created through the enactment of Republic Act No. 7165.

On June 17, 1994, Republic Act No. 7743 was approved which provides for the establishment of congressional, city and municipal libraries and barangay reading centers.

In 1997, the Literacy Coordinating Council created the Blueprint for Action with the goal of eradicating illiteracy in the Philippines. On April 15, the President Fidel V. Ramos issued Administrative Order No. 324 which mandates Government Agencies and Local Government Units to adopt the LCC Blueprint for Action.

On May 27, 2010, Republic Act No. 10122 was approved thereby amending Republic Act No. 7165.

In 2011, the Department of Science and Technology launched the Science & Technology Academic and Research-Based Openly-Operated Kiosk System (STARBOOKS) in Davao City.

In 2019, the Supreme Court e-library, which contains court decisions since 1901 and was created in 2004, was opened for public access. In March 2022, the National Literacy Framework was developed by the Department of Education (DepEd), Literacy Coordinating Council (LCC), and Philippine Normal University (PNU).

In April 26, 2023, the DILG issued Memorandum Circular 2023-067 reiterating DILG Memorandum Circular No. 2007-155, "Creation/Strengthening of Local Literacy Coordinating Council/Literacy Implementing Units.

In 2024, the DILG and DepEd issued Joint Memorandum Circular No. 1, s. 2024 titled, “Creation, Reconstitution, and Strengthening of Local Literacy Councils at the City and Municipal Levels”

On August 16, 2024, the Philippine Statistics Authority Board approved PSA Board Resolution No. 13 titled "Approving the Revised Operational Definition and Methodology in Estimating Basic and Functional Literacy in the Philippines". The new definition is used in the 2024 FLEMMS.

In January 2026, EDCOM II submitted the National Education and Workforce Development Plan (NatPlan) 2026–2035 to the Senate of the Philippines.

== Literacy Rate ==
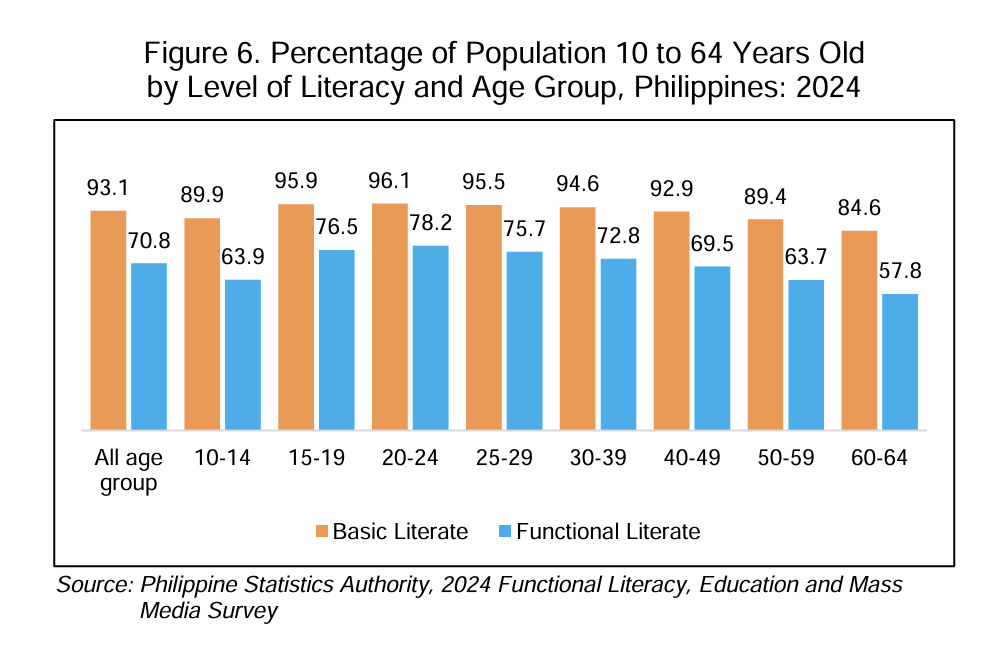
Basic and functional literacy rates in 2024

According to Congressional Commission on Education (EDCOM), In 1993 there are 14.5 million Filipinos that are functionally illiterate which is then reported by the Second Congressional Commission on Education (EDCOM II) that in 2025 the number increased to 24.8 million

In the 2024 the PSA definition of functional literacy, graduates of senior high school are no longer automatically considered as functionally literate.

In 2026, the EDCOM Dashboard was launched containing early childhood education, literacy, and nutrition data that may be used in decision making.

== Literacy Coordinating Council ==
The Literacy Coordinating Council (LCC) was created in 1991 through the enactment of Republic Act No. 7165. The LCC is an attached agency under the Department of Education.

The members of the Local Literacy Council are the following:

- Secretary of the Department of Education (DepEd), as the Chairperson, who may designate an undersecretary as his/her permanent representative
- Secretary of the Department of Interior and Local Government (DILG), or his/her duly designated representative
- President of the Philippine Normal University, or his/her duly designated representative
- Director General of the Philippine Information Agency (PIA), or his/her duly designated representative
- Director General of the National Economic and Development Authority (NEDA), or his/her duly designated representative
- Chairperson of the Senate Committee on Education, Arts and Culture or his/her duly designated representative
- Chairperson of the House of Representatives Committee on Basic Education and Culture or his/her duly designated representative
- Representative from the network of nongovernment organizations (NGOs) involved in the propagation of literacy

=== National Literacy Awards ===
The National Literacy Awards is under the Literacy Coordinating Council which recognizes literacy programs in the Philippines

=== National Literacy Framework ===
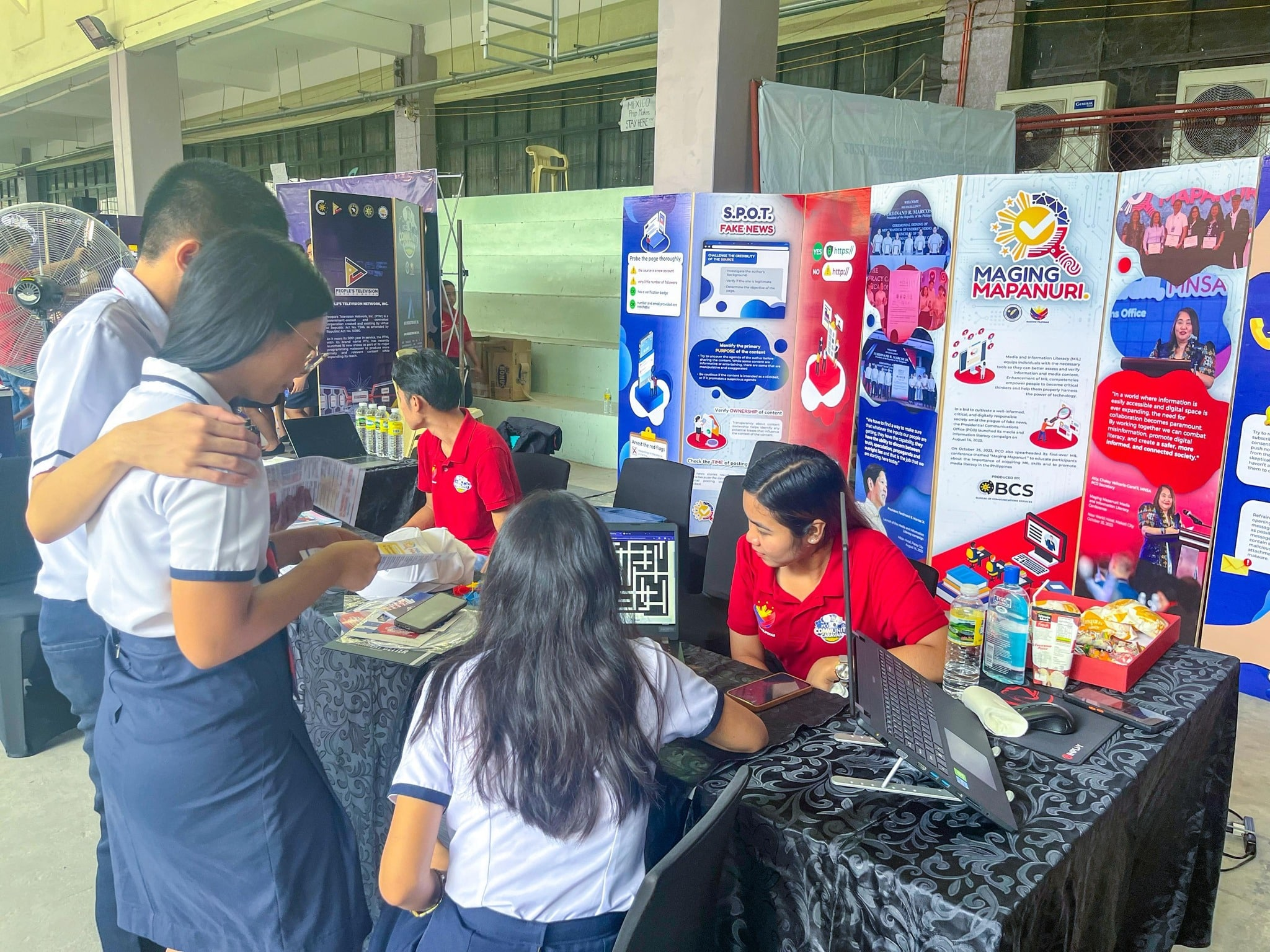
Media Literacy Program conducted by the Presidential Communications Office.

The National Literacy Framework is a Technical Research Report by the Department of Education, Literacy Coordinating Council, and the Philippine Normal University released in March 2022.

The study has identified 19 Literacy Skills.

- Simple literacy
- Digital literacy
- Technological literacy
- Computer literacy
- Governance literacy
- Moral literacy
- Critical literacy
- Media and information literacy
- Financial literacy
- Legal literacy
- Socio-emotional literacy
- Language literacy
- Environmental literacy
- Sexual literacy
- Civic and ethical literacy
- News literacy
- Health literacy
- Visual literacy
- Community-based literacy

== Literacy Programs ==
Literacy Programs in the Philippines are implemented by Government of the Philippines and Non-governmental organizations (NGOs).

=== Academic Recovery and Accessible Learning (ARAL) Program ===
The Academic Recovery and Accessible Learning (ARAL) Program Act was established through the enactment of Republic Act 12028.

The DepEd, DBM, DILG, and DOF issued Joint Memorandum Circular No. 1, s. 2025 which allows the use of the Special Education Fund (SEF) for the ARAL Program

=== National Service Training Program ===
The National Service Training Program (NSTP) was established through Republic Act No. 9163, or the National Service Training Program (NSTP) Act of 2001.

Literacy Training Service (LTS) is one of the three components of NSTP. It is designed to train LTS students for literacy and numeracy programs. CHED encourages inclusion of Literacy Programs through NSTP in extension programs of HEIs.

=== Tara, Basa! Tutoring Program ===
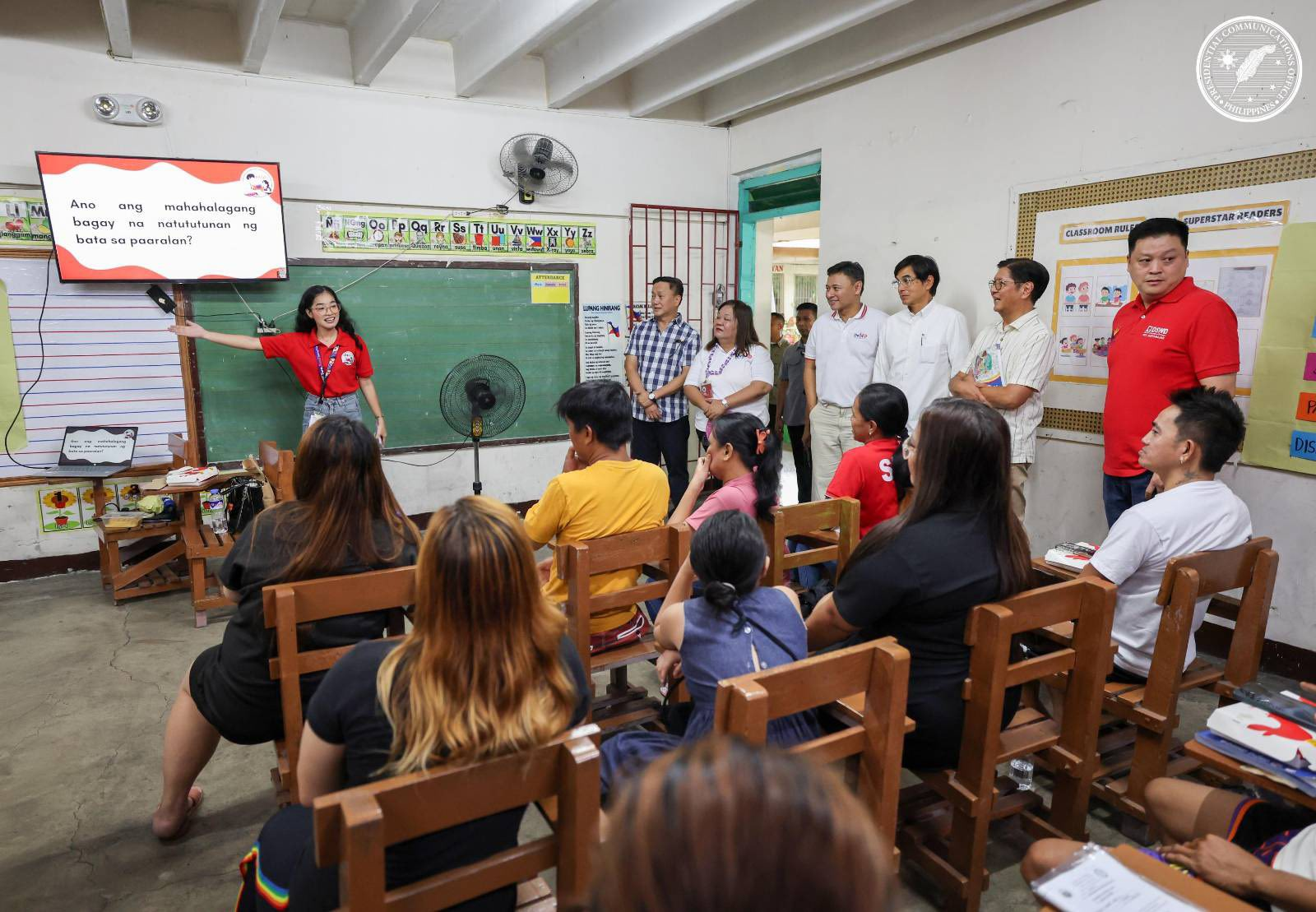
Tara, Basa! Parenting Session at Navotas City on June 2, 2026

Tara, Basa! Tutoring Program is a social protection program implemented by the Department of Social Welfare and Development (DSWD). In the implementation of the program, qualified college students are trained as Tutors for struggling learners in public schools or Youth Development Worker for sessions with parents or guardians.

As of 2026, a "Tara Basa" bill was filed in the Philippine House of Representative to institutionalize the program. According to DSWD, a law will guarantee the program's long-term sustainability and expansion.

=== LGU Programs ===
In June 2025, there are on record 441 cities and municipalities that has Ordinances and Executive Orders on Literacy, and 202 has Local Literacy Councils according to the DILG.

| Local Government Unit | Literacy Program | Description | Reference |
|---|---|---|---|
| Valenzuela City | Nanay Teacher Plus | Parent Empowerment on their Duties and Responsibilities | |
| Quezon City | Zero Illiteracy Tutoring Program | Tutoring Sessions in School and Community Libraries with 2,000 beneficiaries | |
| Pasig | Malusog na Batang Pasigueño | Food Packs and Annual Physical Examinations to 145,000 Students | |
| Naga City | Barangay Literacy Worker (BLW) Program | Literacy Volunteers for Literacy Mapping and as Teacher Aides | |
| Navotas City | NavoYouth Tutors Initiative | Short Term College Employment and Literacy and Numeracy Tutorial Program | |
| Norzagaray | BRIdging Gaps through Helpful Tools (Project BRIGHT) | Smaller class sessions, book distribution, and reading camp | |
| Carmona, Cavite | Learning Assistance Program and Inclusive Support (Project LAPIS) | Community-based literacy program | |

=== NGO Programs ===
| Non-Governmental Organization | Literacy Program | Description | Reference |
|---|---|---|---|
| Angat Buhay | Bayan Ko, Teacher Ko | Volunteer tutor training sessions | |
| Binhi English Literacy Foundation | Beginning Reading Program | Learning Program for struggling children in reading and writing | |
| Inquirer Foundation | INQskwela | Quiz Bee, Journalism Worskshop, and Read-Along Program | |
| Metrobank Foundation | Support for Optimal Learning and Understanding To Improve Overall Numeracy (SOLUTION) program | After-school remediation program for Kinder to Grade 1 | |
| Mind on Wheels | Mind on Wheels | Mobile Library with Teacher-led Sessions for Eight Weeks from Monday to Thursday | |

== See Also ==
- Philippine Literature
