= ROTC (disambiguation) =

ROTC may refer to:

- Reserve Officers' Training Corps (disambiguation), a list of military reserve training programs
  - Reserve Officers' Training Corps, a training program for the United States Armed Forces
- Republic of the Congo (disambiguation), one of several historical or current countries in Central Africa
- Righteously Outrageous Twirling Corps, a gay performance-art ensemble based in Chicago
