= DMST =

DMST can refer to:

- The Drypool and Marfleet Steam Tramways, 19th century steam tram company in Kingston upon Hull, UK
- Domestic Minor Sex Trafficking, a form of child prostitution
- The Department of Military Science & Tactics, a department at various Philippines educational institutes including
  - University of the Philippines
  - University of Santo Tomas,
  - Mapua Institute of Technology Reserve Officers' Training Corps
  - University of the Philippines Diliman
- Do Make Say Think, Canadian music band
