= NSTP =

NSTP may refer to:

- National Service Training Program, a Philippine civic education program
- New Straits Times Press, a Malaysian conglomerate of publishing companies
