= Civic Welfare Training Service =

Philippine defense preparedness program

The Civic Welfare Training Service (CWTS) is one of three components of the National Service Training Program (NSTP), a civic education and defense preparedness program for higher and vocational education students in the Philippines. CWTS activities "are contributory to the general welfare and the betterment of life for the members of the community or the enhancement of its facilities, especially those devoted to improving health, education, environment, entrepreneurship, safety, recreation and morals of the citizenry".

Graduates of the CWTS become members of the National Service Reserve Corps, which may be tapped by the state for the delivery of literacy, civic welfare and disaster risk reduction programs and activities.

== See also ==
- National Service Training Program
- Literacy Training Service
- Reserve Officers' Training Corps (Philippines)
