= Death of Mark Chua =

Murder of Filipino student Mark Chua

Death of Mark Welson Chua
- Chua in an undated photo
- Date: March 18, 2001
- Location: Manila, Philippines
- Cause: Death from suffocation
- Burial: Batangas, Philippines
- Inquiries: Inquiry led by the National Bureau of Investigation
- Accused: Arnulfo Aparri, Jr. Eduardo Tabrilla; Paul Joseph Tan; Michael Von Rainard Manangbao
- Convicted: Arnulfo Aparri, Jr. sentenced to death; commuted to life imprisonment Eduardo Tabrilla sentenced to 6-14 years imprisonment Paul Joseph Tan and Michael Von Rainard Manangbao remain at large; issued arrest warrants by court
- Verdict: Four accused found guilty

Mark Welson Chua (November 30, 1981 - March 18, 2001) was a Filipino student of the University of Santo Tomas whose death is widely believed to be linked to his exposé of alleged irregularities in the Reserve Officers' Training Corps unit of the university. His death became the catalyst for the passage of Republic Act 9163 or the "National Service Training Program Law", which removed completion of mandatory ROTC as a precondition for graduation for male college students in the Philippines.

== Background ==
Chua took his elementary and high school education at Saint Jude Catholic School and his college education at the University of Santo Tomas. As a member of the ROTC unit's intelligence monitoring team, he had first-hand knowledge of corruption within the organization, which he and another student, Romulo Yumol, divulged to UST's official student publication The Varsitarian in January 2001. This resulted in the relief of then-commandant Major Demy T. Tejares and his staff.

== Death ==
Chua received death threats after his revelations. The new ROTC commandant advised him to undergo security training at Fort Bonifacio. On 15 March 2001, he was supposed to meet with an agent but he was never seen alive again. Three days later his decomposing body, wrapped in a carpet, was found floating in the Pasig River near the Jones Bridge. His hands and feet were tied and his face wrapped in cloth and packing tape. The autopsy report showed that sludge was in his lungs, indicating that he was alive when he was thrown into the river. In order to mislead investigators, his abductors had pretended to demand ransom from the Chua family.

On 31 March 2004, Arnulfo Aparri, Jr., one of the four suspects in the killing of Chua, was sentenced to death by lethal injection, and was ordered to pay Php 50,000.00 to the victim's family as indemnity. His sentence was later commuted to life imprisonment without parole after the death penalty was abolished in 2006. Another of the accused, Eduardo Tabrilla, pleaded guilty to culpable homicide and was sentenced to 6-14 years of imprisonment in 2006. The whereabouts of the two other suspects, Paul Joseph Tan and Michael Von Rainard Manangbao remain uncertain.
