= University of Santo Tomas Golden Corps of Cadets =

University of Santo Tomas - Golden Corps of Cadets
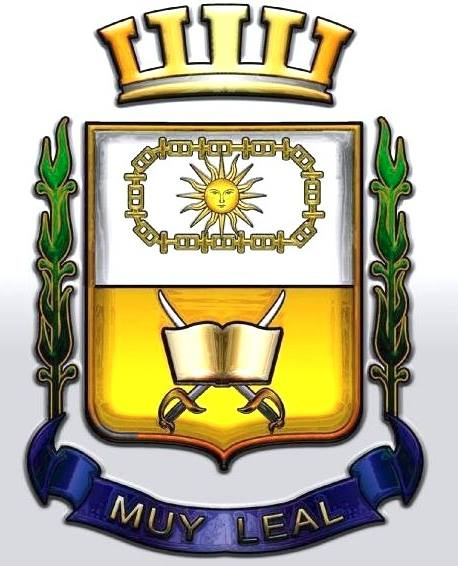
- Active: Established 3 September 1936
- Country: Philippines
- Branch: Philippine Army (Reserve)
- Type: Reserve Officers' Training Corps
- Role: Officer training
- Garrison/HQ: University of Santo Tomas; Sampaloc, Manila, Philippines
- Nickname: UST-GCC
- Mottos: Muy Leal (Spanish: "Very Loyal")

Commanders
- Commandant: COL ROGELIO S GABI (INF) PA

The University of Santo Tomas Golden Corps of Cadets (UST-GCC) also referred to as the UST ROTC Unit is a Reserve Officers' Training Corps unit implementing one of the optional components of the Philippines' National Service Training Program (NSTP) in the University of Santo Tomas. The NSTP is a civic education and preparedness program for college students, the ROTC component of which aims to provide military education and training to mobilize them for national defense preparedness.

== Birth of the Corps ==
The University of Santo Tomas School Senate approved the establishment of ROTC on 3 September 1936 making Military Science and Tactics compulsory for every able-bodied male student in the university. This made UST one of the first institutions to implement the National Defense Act of the Commonwealth Government. On 28 September of the same year, officers were tasked to organize the first cadet corps, and 700 male students constituted the first batch of ROTC cadets. A year after, the Corps obtained the rating of "Superior" — the highest rating by military standards — in annual tactical inspection. During the first inter-ROTC meet, the Corps rated second to the more experienced University of the Philippines ROTC Unit. The Corps grew from a regiment (4 battalions, approximately 800 cadets) to a brigade numbering more than 1,500 cadets. The first batch of Advance ROTC Cadets graduated in March 1939.

== Origin of Muy Leal on the Corps seal ==
On 27 September 1762, the Spanish authorities were caught unaware by the arrival of British battleships sent from Madras. The Rector and Chancellor of Colegio de Santo Tomas, the Most Reverend Father Domingo Collantes, organized a battalion of 200 Thomasian students, ranging in age from 20–22 years, to fight for the defense of the city. Although the British artillery succeeded in breaching the city walls, the King of Spain awarded the Thomasian volunteers with the Muy Leal Crest of Loyalty and the institution was awarded the title Regalia. To this day, the University of Santo Tomas still uses Muy Leal as its motto.

== The Corps over the years ==
After the implementation of the National Defense Act of 1935, the University of Santo Tomas served the country by providing ROTC training for its students. President Manuel L. Quezon also issued Executive Order no. 207, which made ROTC compulsory in all colleges and universities.

During World War II, 2,000 Thomasian cadets volunteered to defend the country. After the war, on 13 September 1946, the ROTC program was reactivated through General Order No. 528, reviving the pre-war units.

During the term of President Ferdinand E. Marcos', ROTC implemented a more aggressive, combat-oriented regimen that exposed cadets to small-unit tactics, unconventional warfare, and self-defense techniques.

In 2001, the Philippine Government made revisions to ROTC, making the program optional and voluntary. Because of this, a new training programs were created for those who did not opt for ROTC training, but were still able to serve their country. The National Service Training Program (NSTP) is composed of:

- Literacy Training Service (LTS)
- Civic Welfare Training Service (CWTS)
- Reserve Officers' Training Corps (ROTC)

At present, ROTC is under the NSTP program of UST and is offered to freshman students for two semesters (ROTC I and ROTC II), both open to men and women.

== See also ==
- Reserve Officers' Training Corps (Philippines)
- Royal University Militias
