= Royal University Militias =

18th-century military units

The Royal University Militias were eighteenth-century Spanish colonial military units in the Philippines.

== History and uniformology ==
In 1611, the Spanish Dominicans founded in the city of Manila the University of Santo Tomas. In 1780, in it were created four Militia Companies, without a fixed number of posts, therefore dependent on the total number of pupils studying there. In 1785, the termination of these university militias would have been decreed and only when needed would they have been rearmed.

This unit wore a green coat lined with white linen, with a red collar and facings. Vest and breeches were also green with gold buttons. Shod with black cordovan shoes and white silk stockings. On their heads they wore a hat made of felt, with three points, with gold braid hemmed at its edge and a red cockade.

These Royal University militia companies were part of the colonial militia organized after the British occupation of Manila—6 October 1762 through 31 May 1764, or one year, seven months, and twenty-five days—to augment the capabilities of the Spanish colonial army in the Philippines. These Spanish colonial militia units which existed for five years, were first raised in 1762 when two hundred student volunteers were formed into four companies to fight the British. After the disbandment of the Royal University Militias in 1785, the UST military unit would reemerge 151 years later, in 1936, as an American colonial ROTC unit.

Until 2001 when compulsory military service was abolished in Spain, University Militias (Milicias Universitarias) also known as IMEC were a method for Spaniards to fulfill military service obligation. Militiamen who completed military training became reserve officers or reserve non-commissioned officers. There existed separate programs for each of Spain's services: Spanish Army (IMECET), Spanish Navy (IMECAR), and Spanish Air Force (IMECEA).

== See also ==
- Luzon Grenadiers
- University of Santo Tomas Golden Corps of Cadets
- Reserve Officers' Training Corps (Philippines)
