= Luzon Grenadiers =

The most distinguished Militia unit of the Spanish colonial army in the Spanish East Indies (modern day Philippines) known as El Ejército Español en Filipinas, was the Luzon Grenadiers (Spanish: Granaderos de Luzon), which was formed in 1796 with the Grenadier and Cazador Companies of all Militia units. After being demobilized in 1817, it was reorganized again in 1823, from that time various changes in its name were experimented with, until 5 December 1851. On that date it received the best official recognition of its value, it was converted to a Veteran Corps — a regular unit — with the designation Prince's Regiment. This distinction, practically without precedents in the history of the entire Spanish colonial army, known as the Overseas Army, reflects the exceptional quality of this unit.

The emergence of the First Republic involved an important series of changes in the designation of Units: substitutions for those with monarchial connotations. By the decree of 1 July 1873, the Sixth Prince's Regiment became the Visayas Regiment.

Toward the end of Spanish colonial rule in the Philippines, the Philippine army, which had always been separate from the Spanish Army, became integrated with the metropolitan army. As a result, the Visayas Regiment became the Seventy-second of the Spanish army.

In 1896, the year the Revolution began, the Seventy-second Visayas Regiment was deployed in Manila and the military posts of the Visayas.

== See also ==
- Royal University Militias
