= Literacy Training Service =

Filipino literacy program

The Literacy Training Service (LTS) is one of three components of the National Service Training Program (NSTP), a civic education and defense preparedness program for higher and vocational education students in the Philippines. The LTS is "a program designed to train students to become teachers of literacy and numeracy skills to school children, out of school youth, and other segments of society".

Graduates of the LTS become members of the National Service Reserve Corps, which may be tapped by the state for the delivery of literacy, civic welfare and disaster risk reduction programs and activities.

== See also ==
- National Service Training Program
- Civic Welfare Training Service
- Reserve Officers' Training Corps (Philippines)
