= Voluntary reservist (Spain) =

Shield of the voluntary reserve.

A voluntary reservist (Spanish: Reservista voluntario) of the Armed Forces of Spain is a Spanish citizen who manages to obtain one of the places that are offered by the Ministry of Defense in order to participate in the different missions carried out by the Armed Forces in the commitments assumed by the Government of Spain.

A reservist maintains their commitment for three years, with the possibility to re-sign for new commitments, provided that the following ages are not exceeded:

- up to 61 years for Officers and NCOs;
- up to 58 years for Enlisted.

The Voluntary Reservist remains for the duration of their commitment in a situation of "availability", developing their "civil" life and profession, and passing annually through periods of "activation" that serve to maintain and improve their military qualification and training.
