= Mapúa Institute of Technology ROTC =

Military Officer Training Program

Mapúa Institute of Technology ROTC Unit
- Active: September 13, 1946 – January 23, 2002 (compulsory/conscription)
- Country: Philippines
- Branch: Philippine Army (Reserve)
- Type: National Service Training Program
- Role: Officer training
- Garrison/HQ: Mapúa University; Intramuros, Manila
- Motto(s): Integrity, Equality, Courage; Once a Cardinal, Always a Cardinal!
- Website: ROTC Website

The "Mapúa Institute of Technology" Reserved Officer's Training Course (ROTC) Unit, currently part of Mapúa University for the National Service Training Program. Originally under the Department of Military Science and Tactics (DMST) as an involuntary military training program (conscription), activated on September 13, 1946, under the 1304th Community Defense Center in Manila, National Capital Region (NCR) Regional Community Defense Group, from the Philippine Army Reserve Command.

== History ==
Mapua Institute of Technology MIT Civil Military Training CMT Unit was activated in July 1940, Pursuant to Executive Order Nr 207 dated June 1939 with 1500 Basic Cadets. Before World War II broke out, there were 33 colleges and universities including MITROTCU, throughout the country that maintained ROTC units. The war set back ROTC training with the closure of all units. Records show that products of the ROTC called to the colors in 1941, 1942 and during the occupation proved their worth in the battlefield.

In 1946, following the end of the Second World War, after liberation, ROTC units were re-established. MIT ROTC Unit was activated under General Orders Nr 526, GHQ dated 13 September 1946. ROTC units in the Manila and Suburban area were placed under the Superintendent of Manila ROTC and PMT Units.

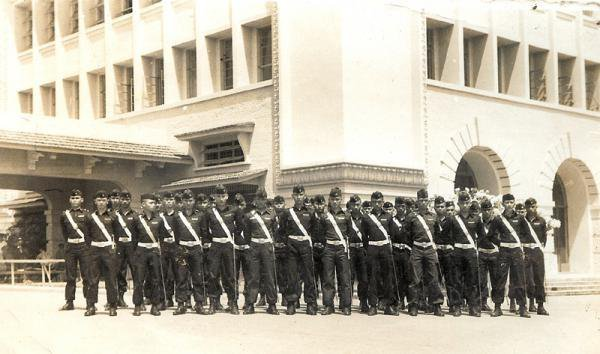
MITROTC 1959

The first postwar Superintendent, MROTC was COLONEL MANUEL T FLORES. He assumed command in July 1946 and was relieved in June 1948. On 13 July 1948, LT COLONEL JOSE F GONZALES was designated as the Superintendent MROTC. He held the position until 22 June 1949. Administration and control of the units were still under the leadership of the Superintendent who had his office in Manila. The coverage of instruction of ROTC includes lessons in infantry, field artillery, general courses on other branches of services such as finance, signal and especially engineering. ROTC units for the Air Force and the Navy had been authorized in June 1949.

With the reorganization of the Armed Forces of the Philippines AFP in 1950, MITROTC Unit was established as per General orders Number 213, GHQ, AFP dated 27 July 1950 in which the ROTC program became compulsion with a two (2) year course and prerequisite for college curriculum. Enclosed with the activation of the Metropolitan Citizen Military Training Command MCMTC on 1 April 1976 the MITROTCU was absorbed by the MCMTC.

ROTC units under the technical supervision of MCMTC was absorbed by the Reserved Command Philippine Army, now Army Reserved Command ARESOM, and further assigned under the National Capital Region Regional Community Defense Unit NCR RCDU later NCR Regional Community Deference Group NCR RCDG.

NCR RCDG was tasked to organized and train personnel for the Reserved Component of the AFP and administer the ROTC training in the different Colleges and Universities within Metro Manila.

The program is likely no longer being offered as no updates have been given since 2022.

== Alumni association ==
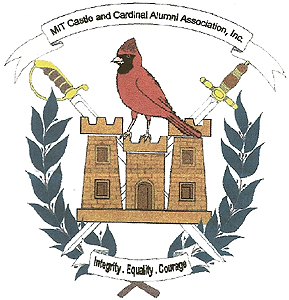
MIT S&CAAI

The Mapua Institute of Technology Sword & Castle Alumni Association, Incorporated (MITSCAAI) is an affiliate alumni association of National Association of Mapua Alumni (NAMA). Graduates of all schools and departments including high school and Advance ROTC automatically become members of NAMA on their graduation day.

MITSCAAI is an organization of former cadet officers of Mapua Institute of Technology Corps of Cadets from 1929 to present.
