= Republic of the Congo (disambiguation) =

Republic of the Congo Democratic Republic of the Congo

Republic of the Congo may refer to the:

- Republic of the Congo, the country also known as Congo-Brazzaville (1960–present)
  - People's Republic of the Congo, a socialist state that encompassed what is now the Republic of the Congo (1969–1992)
- Democratic Republic of the Congo, the country also known as Congo-Kinshasa (1997–present) and formerly known as Zaire (1971–1997)
  - Republic of the Congo (Léopoldville), the predecessor to the Democratic Republic of the Congo, also known as Congo-Léopoldville (1960–1964)
  - Free Republic of the Congo, a rival government to Congo-Léopoldville, also known as Congo-Stanleyville (1960–1962)
  - People's Republic of the Congo, a rival government to Congo-Léopoldville declared by the Simba rebels (1963–1965)

== See also ==
- Congo (disambiguation)
