= Reserve Officers' Training Corps (Taiwan) =

Reserve Officers' Training Corps (Chinese: 大學儲備軍官訓練團) in the Republic of China (Taiwan) was first proposed by the Ministry of National Defense for the ROC Armed Forces in September 1995 and has been in operation since 1997 or 1999. Other sources mention that an ROTC program was already active in Taiwan in the 1960s. ROTC in Taiwan is based on the counterpart program of the United States Armed Forces. The proposed training regimen consisted of three to four additional hours of military courses each week aside from university classes. During the winter vacation, students were to attend a one or two-week boot camp and in the summer, they would undergo six weeks of military training.

== Benefits and obligation ==
The Ministry of National Defense provides three years of financial aid for the students' university studies, as well as stipends. Graduates of the ROTC program are given the rank of second lieutenant; they then proceed with specialized military training. ROTC graduates are required to serve in the military for four years, after which they are free to rejoin civilian life. They may also elect to remain in the military as career officers.

== Other developments ==
As of 2001, the Taiwan ROTC program was only available for college students aiming to join the Army.

By 2009, the Ministry of Education has reduced the number of ROTC courses at National Taiwan University, considering the program a symbol of autocracy. Despite this, the ROTC program remains popular among Taiwanese college students.

== See also ==
- Reserve Officers' Training Corps
- Reserve Officers' Training Corps (Philippines)
- Reserve Officers' Training Corps (South Korea)
