= Reserve Officers' Training Corps (South Korea) =

College-based military training program

Reserve Officers' Training Corps (Hangul: 학생군사교육단; Hanja: 學軍士官) in South Korea is a college-based officer training program which was established in 1961. South Korea's Conscription Law applies to males, aged between 18 and 35, although women are allowed to enroll in the ROTC as of 2010.

Applicants to the ROTC program go through a screening process; a written exam, an interview and health examination, and a background check. Once accepted, members undergo physical and military education throughout the semester; they are also required to undergo actual military training during school holidays. After commissioning, they serve for two and a half years; an individual may choose to extend his or her service past the required period in pursuit of an active military career.

== History ==
=== Background of creation ===
South Korea's first school corps was born in the Navy. In the case of the Navy, on March 11, 1959, the first school group of the 3rd Army was launched by establishing the Naval Busan Military Education Group (Navy 1001st Student Military Education Group) at Korea Maritime University. The reason why the Naval School Corps was established at the Maritime University is deeply related to the nature and purpose of the school's establishment. The Korea Maritime University was a member of the Ministry of National Defense from 1947 to 1949, and on October 17, 1958, the Naval Reserve Order (Presidential Decree No. 1935) was promulgated and implemented, resembling the Sangseon Academy, where all students were candidates for the school. Over time, there have been several changes to the relevant military service law, and now the selective school group and the boarding service reserve system are in place together. The Marine University's Naval School Corps system was implemented to allow commercial officers (ship's navigators/engineers) and students at the Marine University who train national shipping personnel to work on board commercial ships immediately after graduation. Therefore, students had to complete military science and military training as well as their majors during their enrollment, and the graduation ceremony was held as an appointment ceremony. Most of the graduates were commissioned as second lieutenants and discharged from the military, serving in merchant ships as naval reserves. Some of the graduates served as active naval officers. It can be said to be a system for efficient manpower management for commercial officers who contribute to the national economy through maritime transport in peacetime and are responsible for military service at sea as naval reserves in wartime.

In the case of the Army, in the early 1960s, the government of the Republic of Korea at that time was in a desperate position to increase military power urgently in the face of confrontation between the two Koreas. As part of this, the school military officer system was established to solve the most serious problem in the military command system at the time by selecting college students for military education and commissioning them as officers upon graduation. This has the advantage of increasing standing power by recruiting elite resources with expertise in each major field after graduating from college in a short period of time, and by incorporating them as reserve forces commanders after active service. In addition, school military officers were able to significantly reduce the burden of the budget for training education compared to the military academy, which was educated for four years.

- Naval School Corps: Korea Maritime University, 11 March 1959.
- Air Force School Corps: Korea Air Force 1971.
- Women's college group: Sookmyung Women's University in 2010.

==== Changes in Name and System ====
At the same time as the establishment of the Student Military Training Corps on June 1, 1961, the Army Headquarters decided to enact the unit symbol of the Student Corps in order to unify the unit symbol of the Student Corps and enhance the pride and dignity of ROTC candidates. As a result of collecting opinions from each academy, the ROTC English letter was finally decided to imitate the ROTC insignia design used at universities in the United States at the time, and each academy was required to attach the above insignia to the upper arm of ROTC candidates' uniforms. From the 5th generation, the white insignia "Hakhundan", which stands for the Student Military Training Group, was used on a shield-shaped blue background to establish the spirit of self-defense and national identity.

The term "reserve officer training group" or "reserve officer candidate" was initially designated in consideration of the nature of the system that required him to serve in the military after being appointed as a reserve officer. However, the ROTC system, an officer training course, was managed as a reserve, and not only did it not sound good in terms of title, but it was also complicated to order a supplementary summons for all officers and peacetime to serve in the military.

Thus, in 1983, the candidate status was decided as the first national role in consideration of the relationship between the number of military units, salaries and allowances, restrictions on the application of military laws and disciplinary action, and the possibility of a problem with the university. According to the revision of the Military Service Act, the name of the candidate was changed from a reserve officer candidate to a school officer candidate, and during the candidate period, the "school officer candidate" Lim Kwan-si maintained consistency such as "school officer from school."

== Statistics on school district officers ==
As of 2017, the school military officer system produced about 190,000 officers, 52 generals, including 6 generals by the 10th, and 215 colonel by the 17th, and about 20 out of 20,000 active military officers.

Results of a survey of 100,000 members by the ROTC Central Association (2008)

- 2,145 people in the legislative and administrative fields (former police chief, etc.)
- Political circles (17 lawmakers, etc.) 1,001
- 915 people in the media (more than 60 people at the director level)
- 3,217 professors (8 university presidents = Lee Jang-moo, president of Seoul National University, Son Byung-doo, president of Sogang University, Hwang Joon-sung, president of Soongsil University, Jang Ho-sung, president of Dankook University, Yoo Byung-jin, etc.), 4,521 teachers
- 10,000 business executives (34.8%, SK Telecom Honorary Chairman Son Kil-seung, Lee Young-joo, Iljin Group Chairman Huh Jin-kyu, Unix Electronics Chairman Lee Choong-koo, Samsung President Kang Sung-won, Hanadok Pharmaceutical Chairman Kim Young-jin, Daelim C&S CEO Hwang Ho-rim, CEO Lee Wang-don, CEO of Daejeon Poly
- Entertainment industry (actor Ahn Sung-ki (Korea University), comedian Lee Sang-yong (Korea University), actor Joo-hyun (Konkuk University), singer Marvel J (Kyunghee University), etc.)

However, while the military service period continues to be reduced, the service period of school military officers continues to be fixed, and for this reason, the 61st school district (commissioned officer in 2023) candidates were not enough.[4] In Korea, the shorter the military service period, the higher the preference. Therefore, in the case of noncommissioned officers, they do not apply if they are not working as professional soldiers, so the number of active service personnel is similar to that of officers and noncommissioned officers, but the number of reserve officers is remarkably small. In 1997, when the 35th class was commissioned as a lieutenant, 28 months of military service and 26 months of military service, and considering that if an officer is commissioned as a lieutenant, he or she is required to train for four more months. For this reason, the popularity of school military officers who serve for six more months has waned.

== Impact on South Korean society ==
It was estimated by a Library of Congress research in 1990 that approximately 40% of new second lieutenants were commissioned from the ROTC program after two years of training and two years and three months of obligatory service; most would leave the service after the obligatory period. The Korea Army Academy at Yeongcheon produced another 40% of new second lieutenants; 5% were graduates of various military academies and 15% were directly commissioned specialists in the medical corps, judge advocates and chaplains. It has been postulated that the ROTC program in South Korea has contributed to national integration and cultural homogeneity, where military training had become a common cultural and organizational reference point; military officers became business managers and military conscripts became factory workers. A case in point would be Hyundai, which systematically preferred workers who had undergone ROTC training.

In 2011, South Korea had 9,063 ROTC cadets from 109 universities.

== Evaluation ==
Until the establishment of ROTC, the military training program lacked consistency in its implementation plans, the lack of operational constraints and administrative support of senior officers, and the purpose of receiving indifference and military training by students with a higher degree of service and expense. However, the establishment of a ROTC was able to solve all problems, efficiently carry out the training procedures of junior officers, and smoothly fill up the junior officers.

== Characteristic ==
- In the case of Army ROTC, cadets have the opportunity to transfer to the Marine Corps upon becoming fourth-year candidates. If they transfer to the Marine Corps, their service period is reduced by four months. For ROTC units originally established as Marine Corps units, this applies from the start, and their service period is similarly shorter from the beginning.
- They are the only ones who live off-base during the officer commissioning process. Military academies live on-base for 4 or 2 years, and commissioned officers and officer candidates also live on-base. During the semester, they only take military science courses with 7 hours of class per week, and receive basic military training for 4 weeks during every vacation.

== List of student military education groups ==
Army

The following is a list of universities with the Army Student Military Education Corps. It is in single order, and the area followed the classification of student military schools.The year of installation was based on the year of promotion or installation after being officially granted a single number, not in the form of division.

School District Number	School name	territory	Year of installation	note
101	Seoul national university	the west of Seoul	1961	
102	Korea university	Eastern Seoul	1961	
103	Sungkyunkwan University	Eastern Seoul	1961	Humanities and Social Sciences Campus
1031	Sungkyunkwan University	Northern Gyeonggi-do Province	1980	Natural Science Campus
104	결번			
105	Chonnam National University	Honam region	1961	Gwangju Campus
1051	Chonnam National University	Honam region		Yeosu Campus
106	Chonbuk National University	Honam region	1961	
107	Yonsei University	the west of Seoul	1961	
108	Kyung Hee University	Eastern Seoul	1961	Seoul Campus
1081	Kyung Hee University	Northern Gyeonggi-do Province		International Campus
109	Kyungpook National University	Daegu and North Gyeongsang Province	1961	
110	Busan National University	Busan, South Gyeongsang Province	1961	
111	Chung-Ang University	the west of Seoul	1961	Seoul Campus
1111	Chung-Ang University	southern part of Gyeonggi-do Province	1980	Anseong Campus
112	Dongguk University	the west of Seoul	1961	
113	Konkuk University	Eastern Seoul	1961	
114	결번			
115	Hanyang University	Eastern Seoul	1961	
116	Chungnam National University	South Chungcheong Province	1961	
117	Dong-A University	Busan, South Gyeongsang Province	1961	
118	Chosun University	Honam region	1961	
119	Hankuk University of Foreign Studies	Eastern Seoul		
120	Inha University	Northern Gyeonggi-do Province		
121	Yeungnam University	Daegu and North Gyeongsang Province		
122	Kyunggi University	southern part of Gyeonggi-do Province		
123	Chungbuk National University	North Chungcheong Province		
124	결번			
125	Dankook University	southern part of Gyeonggi-do Province	1965	Jukjeon Campus
1251	Dankook University	southern part of Gyeonggi-do Province	1980	Cheonan Campus
126	Gyeongsang National University	Busan, South Gyeongsang Province		
127	Kangwon National University	Gangwon Province	1966	
128	Wonkwang University	Honam region		
129	Kookmin University	the west of Seoul		
130	Myongji University	Northern Gyeonggi-do Province	1970	
131	Sogang University	the west of Seoul		
132	Incheon National University	Northern Gyeonggi-do Province		
133	Hongik University	the west of Seoul	1972	Seoul Campus
1331	Hongik University	North Chungcheong Province	1991	Sejong Campus
134	결번			
135	Gongju National University	South Chungcheong Province	1974	
136	Soongsil University	the west of Seoul		
137	Cheongju University	North Chungcheong Province		
138	Keimyung University	Daegu and North Gyeongsang Province	1977	
139	Ajou University	southern part of Gyeonggi-do Province	1978	
140	University of Ulsan	Daegu and North Gyeongsang Province		
141	Kyungnam University	Busan, South Gyeongsang Province	1976	
142	Kwangwoon University	Eastern Seoul	1980	
143	University of Seoul	Eastern Seoul	1980	
144	Jeonju University	Honam region		
145	Daegu University	Daegu and North Gyeongsang Province		
146	Hannam University	South Chungcheong Province		
147	Catholic Kwandong University	Gangwon Province	1981	
148	Dongui University	Busan, South Gyeongsang Province		
149	Kyungsung University	Busan, South Gyeongsang Province		
150	Korea National University of Education	North Chungcheong Province		
151	Gachon University	Northern Gyeonggi-do Province	1985	
152	Geumo University of Technology	Daegu and North Gyeongsang Province		
153	Wooseok University	South Chungcheong Province		
154	결번			
155	Kunsan University	Honam region		
156	Sangji University	Gangwon Province	1992	
157	Pukyong National University	Busan, South Gyeongsang Province	1992	
158	Suwon University	southern part of Gyeonggi-do Province		
159	Soonchun National University	Honam region		
160	Mokpo National University	Honam region		
161	Andong University	Daegu and North Gyeongsang Province		
162	Sejong University	Eastern Seoul		
163	Gangneung-Wonju National University	Gangwon Province	1992	
164	결번			
165	Changwon University	Busan, South Gyeongsang Province		
166	Hoseo University	North Chungcheong Province		
167	Soonchunhyang University	North Chungcheong Province		
168	Daejeon National University	South Chungcheong Province		
169	Mokwon University	South Chungcheong Province		
170	Baejae University	South Chungcheong Province	1992	
171	Hallym University	Gangwon Province	1992	
172	Dongshin University	Honam region		
173	Inje University	Busan, South Gyeongsang Province	1992	
174	결번			
175	교육단 폐지(서울교육대학교, 2015)			
176	Kyungin National University of Education	Northern Gyeonggi-do Province	1992	
177	교육단 폐지(대구교육대학교, 2015)			
178	교육단 폐지(부산교육대학교, 2015)			
179	교육단 폐지(광주교육대학교, 2015)			
180	교육단 폐지(춘천교육대학교, 2021)			
181	교육단 폐지(진주교육대학교, 2015)			
182	폐교로 인한 교육단 폐지(서남대학교, 2018)			
183	Semyung University	Gangwon Province	1993	
184	결번			
185	결번			
186	결번			
187	결번			
188	결번			
189	결번			
190	결번			
191	결번			
192	결번			
193	Honam University	Honam region		
194	결번			
195	Seowon University	North Chungcheong Province		
196	Hansung University	Eastern Seoul		
197	결번			
198	결번			
199	Pusan National University of Foreign Studies	Busan, South Gyeongsang Province		
200	Konyang University	South Chungcheong Province	2005	
201	Seoul National University of Science and Technology	Eastern Seoul	2006	
202	Sangmyung University	the west of Seoul		Seoul Campus
2021	Sangmyung University	North Chungcheong Province		Cheonan Campus
203	Yong In University	southern part of Gyeonggi-do Province		
204	결번			
205	Gangnam University	Northern Gyeonggi-do Province		
206	Seokyung University	the west of Seoul	2007	
207	Catholic University of Korea	Northern Gyeonggi-do Province		
208	Daejin University	Gangwon Province		
209	Baekseok University	South Chungcheong Province	2007	
210	Hanbat University	South Chungcheong Province	2006	
211	Sunmoon University	North Chungcheong Province	2006	
212	Daegu Catholic University	Daegu and North Gyeongsang Province		
213	Dongyang University	Daegu and North Gyeongsang Province	2007	
214	결번			
215	Dongmyeong University	Busan, South Gyeongsang Province		
216	Pyeongtaek University	southern part of Gyeonggi-do Province		
217	Sookmyung Women's University	the west of Seoul	2010	First time at a women's university
218	Sungshin Women's University	Eastern Seoul		
219	폐교로 인한 교육단 폐지(경남과학기술대학교, 2021)			
220	Kyungdong University	Gangwon Province	2012	
221	Gwangju National University	Honam region		
222	South Seoul National University	southern part of Gyeonggi-do Province		
223	Woosong University	South Chungcheong Province		
224	결번			
225	Ewha Women's University	the west of Seoul	2016	
1021	Korea University Sejong Campus	North Chungcheong Province		
1071	Yonsei University Future Campus	Gangwon Province		
1121	Dongguk University WISE Campus	Daegu and North Gyeongsang Province		
1131	Konkuk University Glocal Campus	Gangwon Province		
1151	Hanyang University ERICA Campus	Northern Gyeonggi-do Province		

Navy and Marine Corps

School District Number	School name	territory	Year of installation	note
1001	Korea Maritime University	(구분 없음)		Marine Corps support available
1002	Jeju National University	(구분 없음)		Marine Corps support available
1003	Pukyong National University	(구분 없음)	1973	Marine Corps support available
2002	Mokpo National Maritime University	(구분 없음)		
1004	Mokpo National Maritime University	(구분 없음)		Marine Corps support available

Air force

School District Number	School name	territory	Year of installation	note
1	Korea National Aviation University	(구분 없음)		
2	Hanseo University	(구분 없음)		
3	Korea National University of Transportation	(구분 없음)	2013	
4	Seoul National University of Science and Technology	(구분 없음)		
5	Gyeongsang National University	(구분 없음)		
6	Sookmyung Women's University	(구분 없음)		
7	Yonsei University	(구분 없음)		

== Abolished school district ==
- Seoul National University of Education - 175th Student Military Education Group (abolished in 2015 / plans to support candidates, insufficient student interest, etc.)
- Daegu National University of Education - 177th Student Military Education Group (abolished in 2015 / plans to support candidates, insufficient student interest, etc.)
- Busan National University of Education - 178th Student Military Education Group (abolished in 2015 / plans to support candidates, insufficient student interest, etc.)
- Gwangju National University of Education - 179th Student Military Education Group (abolished in 2015 / plans to support candidates, insufficient student interest, etc.)
- Jinju National University of Education - 181st Student Military Education Group (abolished in 2015 / plans to support candidates, insufficient student interest, etc.)
- Seonam University - 182nd Student Military Education Group (abolished in 2018 / closed school)
- Chuncheon National University of Education - 180th Student Military Education Group (abolished in 2021 / plans to support candidates, insufficient student interest, etc.)

== Ties with United States ROTC ==
Cadets of the United States Reserve Officers' Training Corps routinely collaborate with their South Korean counterparts in cultural exchanges such as the Cultural Understanding and Language Proficiency (CULP) program.

== See also ==
- Reserve Officers' Training Corps
- Reserve Officers' Training Corps (Philippines)
- Reserve Officers' Training Corps (Taiwan)
- Army Cadet military school
