= Conscription in the Philippines =

Conscription, commonly known as "the draft", in the Philippines has been implemented at several points in the country's history. As of 2022, no mandatory conscription is in effect in the Philippines and military service is entirely voluntary as stated in the 1987 constitution. However, there have been calls for mandatory conscription by Vice President Sara Duterte, along with several Senators pushing for a bill to introduce mandatory Reserve Officers' Training Corps enrollment.

== History ==
Mandatory military service has been employed several times over the course of Philippine history.

=== Spanish Empire ===
During Spanish colonial rule, Filipinos were drafted for military service and deployed as auxiliary forces both in local and foreign campaigns of the Spanish Empire. One author states that the Spanish friars supervised the conscription of parishioners into the colonial army. The Spaniards evidently commended the Filipinos' military service, citing them as excellent soldiers in campaigns such as the taking of Ternate. During the first phase of the Philippine Revolution (1896-1897), more than 17,000 native Filipinos were in the Spanish order of battle, 60% of which were made up of members of the Guardia Civil.

=== Philippine Commonwealth ===
Conscription was introduced prior to World War II during the Philippine Commonwealth in 1935 with a term of enlistment of 5 and a half months. President Manuel L. Quezon issued Executive Order No. 207 in 1939 in order to implement the National Defense Act of 1935, otherwise known as Commonwealth Act No. 1, the embodiment of the national defense plan formulated by General Douglas MacArthur for the Philippine Commonwealth. This executive order made ROTC obligatory at all colleges and universities with a total enrollment of 100 students and greater. This measure was made in order to help fill out the reserve force requirement of 400,000 men by 1946 and especially for junior reserve officers. However, after a trip to Tokyo in 1939, Quezon concluded that Japan was much too powerful and that the Filipinos could not effectively defend their homeland. He therefore curtailed MacArthur's military preparedness program by halting conscription and reducing by half the number of reserves in training.

=== Martial Law under Ferdinand Marcos ===
Ferdinand Marcos declared martial law on 21 September 1972. He issued at least two Presidential Decrees governing the terms of conscription of trainees into selective emergency military service, one for a period of 12 months in 1973 and another for a period of 18 months in 1974.

=== Present day ===
Conscription remains a possibility as Section 4, Article II of the Constitution of the Philippines states:

"The Government may call upon the people to defend the State and, in the fulfillment thereof, all citizens may be required, under conditions provided by law, to render personal, military or civil service."

— Section 4, Article II, Constitution of the Philippines

In addition, the National Service Training Program, instituted by virtue of Republic Act 9163, is a training program for national service, wherein both male and female college students of any baccalaureate degree course or technical vocational course in public or private educational institutions are obliged to undergo one of three program components for an academic period of two semesters.

=== Future implementation ===
In January 2022, before her election as Vice President, Sara Duterte called for mandatory conscription for all Filipinos above 18 years of age. After her election, the then-Vice President-elect stated that she wanted mandatory ROTC training under priority legislation. In July, Senators Francis Tolentino and Robin Padilla announced support for a bill by Senator Ronald Dela Rosa that would introduce a mandatory ROTC for Filipino students in grades 11 and 12, with a voluntary advanced ROTC program available for the first two years of higher education. Dela Rosa stated that refiling the mandatory ROTC bill is the second highest of his "top 10 priority bills" to submit on the first session of the 19th Congress, which opened on 25 July.

== See also ==
- National service
- National Service Training Program
