= Reservist =

Member of a military reserve force

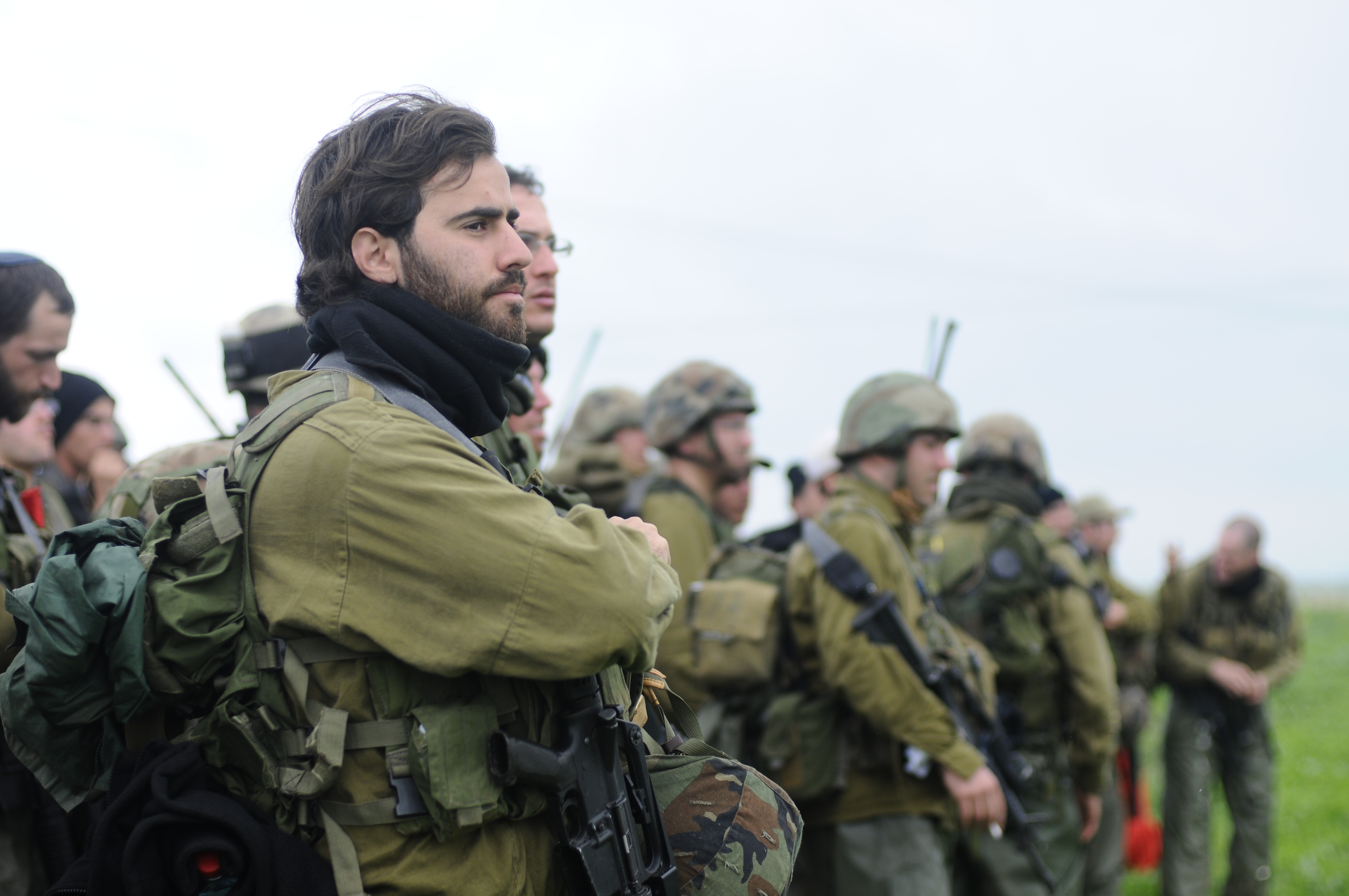
Reservists of the Israel Defense Forces, 2011

A reservist is a person who is a member of a military reserve force. They are otherwise civilians, and in peacetime have careers outside the military. Reservists usually go for training on an annual basis to refresh their skills. This person can be a former active-duty member of the armed forces, and they remain a reservist either voluntarily, or by obligation. In some countries such as Israel, Norway, Finland, Singapore, and Switzerland, reservists are conscripted soldiers who are called up for training and service when necessary.

== History ==
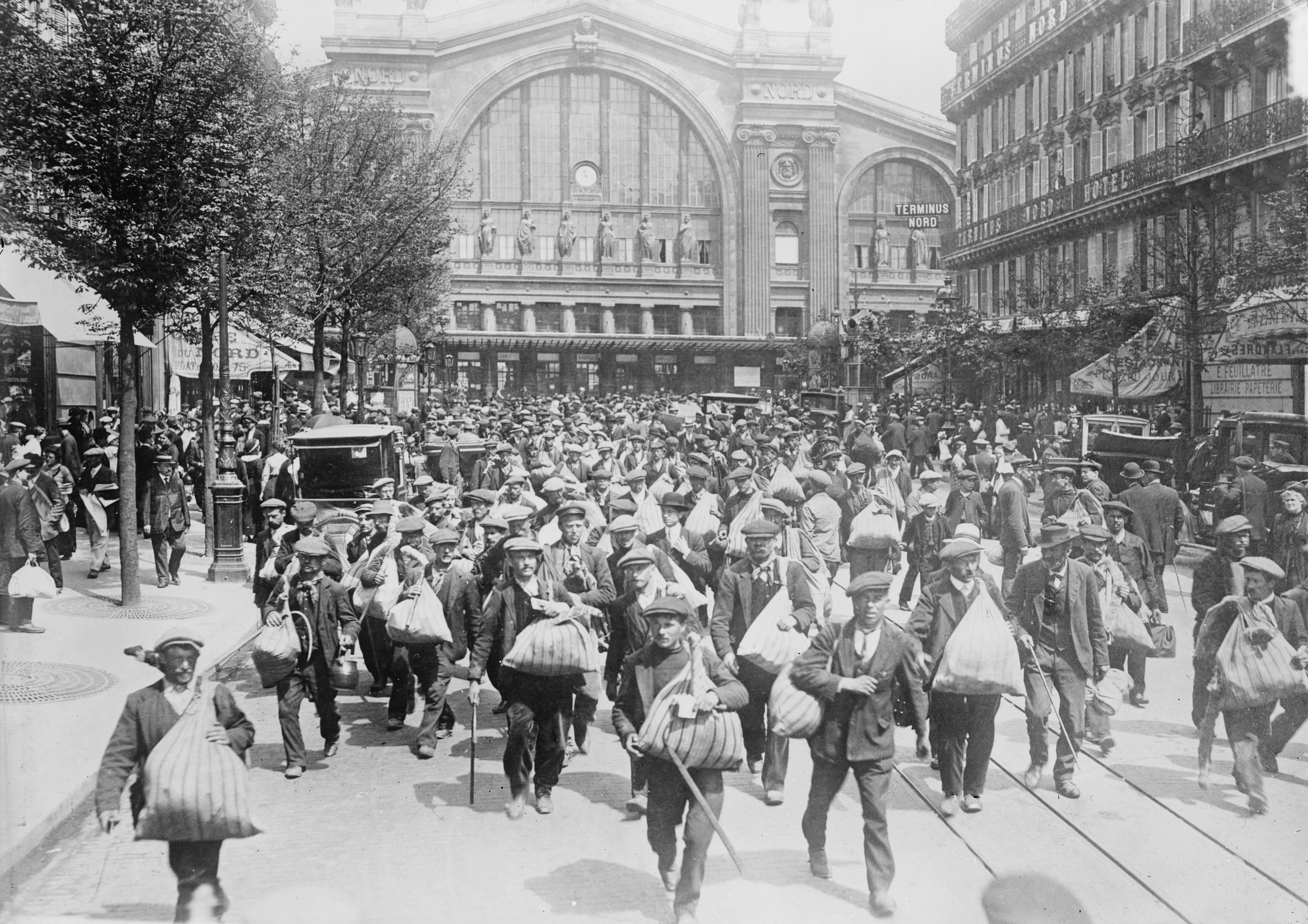
Belgian Reservists leaving the Gare du Nord in Paris, 1914

The notion of a reservist has been around, in many forms, for thousands of years. In ancient times, reservist forces such as the Anglo-Saxon Fyrd and the Viking Leidangr formed the main fighting strength of most armies. It was only at the end of the 17th century that professional standing armies became the norm.

Historically reservists played a significant role in Europe after the Prussian defeat in the Battle of Jena-Auerstedt. On 9 July 1807 in the Treaty of Tilsit, Napoleon forced Prussia to drastically reduce its military strength, in addition to ceding large amounts of territory. The Prussian army could no longer be stronger than 42,000 men.

The Krümpersystem, introduced to the Prussian army by the military reformer Gerhard von Scharnhorst, arranged for giving recruits a short period of training, which in the event of war could be considerably expanded. With this the reduction of the army's strength did not have the desired effect, and in the following wars Prussia was able to draw up a large number of trained soldiers. By the time of the German Empire, reservists were already being given so-called "war arrangements" following the completion of their military service, which contained exact instructions relating to the conduct of reservists in time of war.

== By country ==
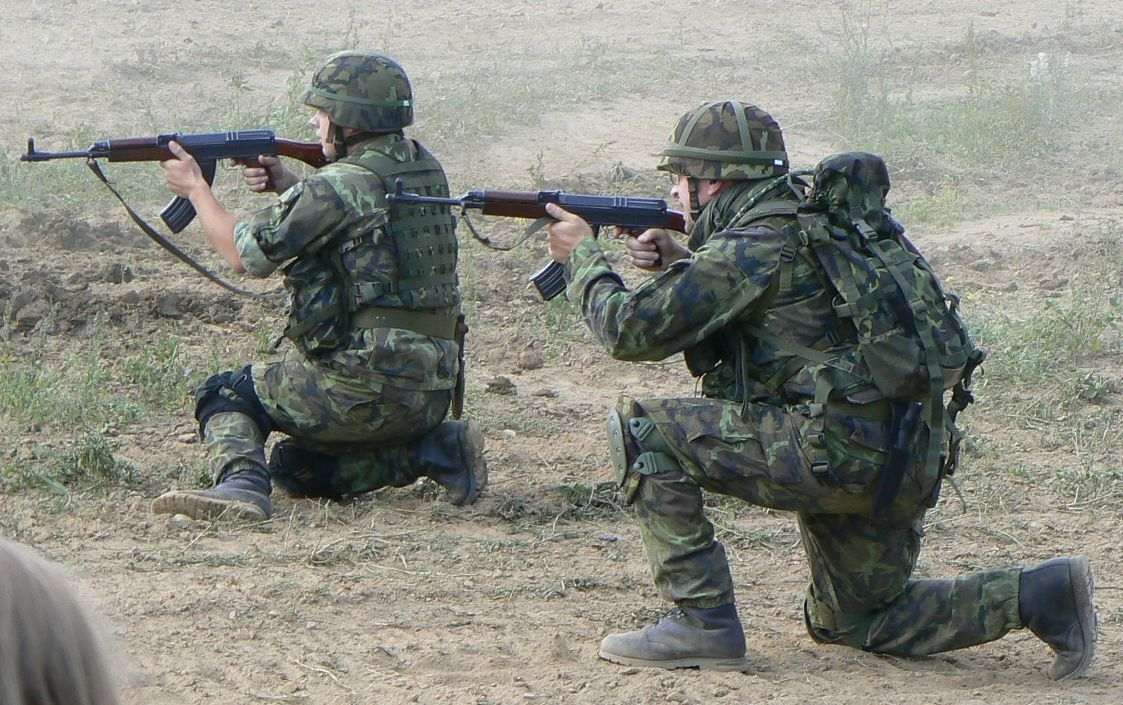
Czech reservists in 2008

=== Finland ===
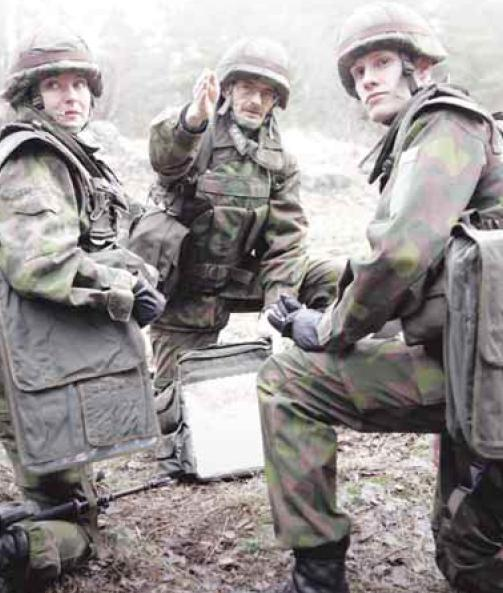
Finnish reservists in a training exercise.

The Finnish Defence Forces are based on universal male conscription. All men above 18 years of age are required to serve either 6, 9, or 12 months. Yearly about 27,000 conscripts are trained. 80% of the males complete the service. The conscripts first receive basic training, after which they are assigned to various units for special training. Privates who are trained for tasks not requiring special skills serve for 6 months. In technically demanding tasks, the time of service is 9, or in some cases, 12 months. Those selected for NCO (non-commissioned officer) or officer training serve 12 months. At the completion of the service, the conscripts receive a reserve military rank of private, lance corporal, corporal, sergeant or second lieutenant, depending on their training and accomplishments. After their military service, the conscripts are placed in reserve until the end of their 50th or 60th living year, depending on their military rank. During their time in reserve, the reservists are liable to participate in military refresher exercises for a total of 40, 75 or 100 days, depending on their military rank. In addition, all reservists are liable for activation in a situation where the military threat against Finland has seriously increased, in full or partial mobilization or in a large-scale disaster or a virulent epidemic. The males who do not belong to the reserve may only be activated in case of full mobilization, and those rank-and-file personnel who have fulfilled 50 years of age only with a specific parliamentary decision.

=== Germany ===
Every conscript who has served at least a day in the Bundeswehr is a reservist, unless he is declared ineligible for military service or has made a claim of conscientious objection. Soldiers of enlisted ranks with a limited contract (either 4, 8 or 12 years) or professional soldiers, who have filled their tour of duty, are likewise part of the reserve. This is also the case for women, but on the basis of the Soldatengesetz (Eng: Soldier Bill), not the Wehrpflichtgesetz (Conscription Bill). Every soldier follows his rank with the initials "d.R." ("der Reserve"—"in the reserve"). So it does not affect whether the soldier is called up, placed in an inactive formation, or not. Only professional soldiers use the appellation "a.D." ("außer Dienst"—"out of service") after the end of their service. All others (part-time soldiers and conscripts) strictly use "d.R." until the end of their lives.

Reservists are an integral part of the Bundeswehr. They are essential for the capability of the armed forces in time of war.

Reservists can be active in the Bundeswehr in addition to their mandatory service. This mostly happens through (mostly voluntarily) military exercises or official events. Apart from that the Bundeswehr organises reservist unions as particularly representative supporting organisations of "voluntarily reservist work".

Eligibility for compulsory military service for soldiers and other servicemen of low rank ends at the end of the 45th year of age. Thereafter the conscript is no longer part of the reserve. Despite that the appellations "a.D." or "d.R." may still be used. Conscription for non-commissioned officers (NCOs) and officers lasts until the 60th year of age. Until the 32nd year of age every conscript is subject to military inspection.

Recognised conscientious objectors, who have completed their civil service, are nonetheless part of the reserve and in the event of war will be given a suitable non-combatant role outside the Bundeswehr, such as emergency medical services, clearing debris or minesweeping.

All conscripts who have not done their service belong to the Ersatzreserve (replacement reserve).

=== Israel ===
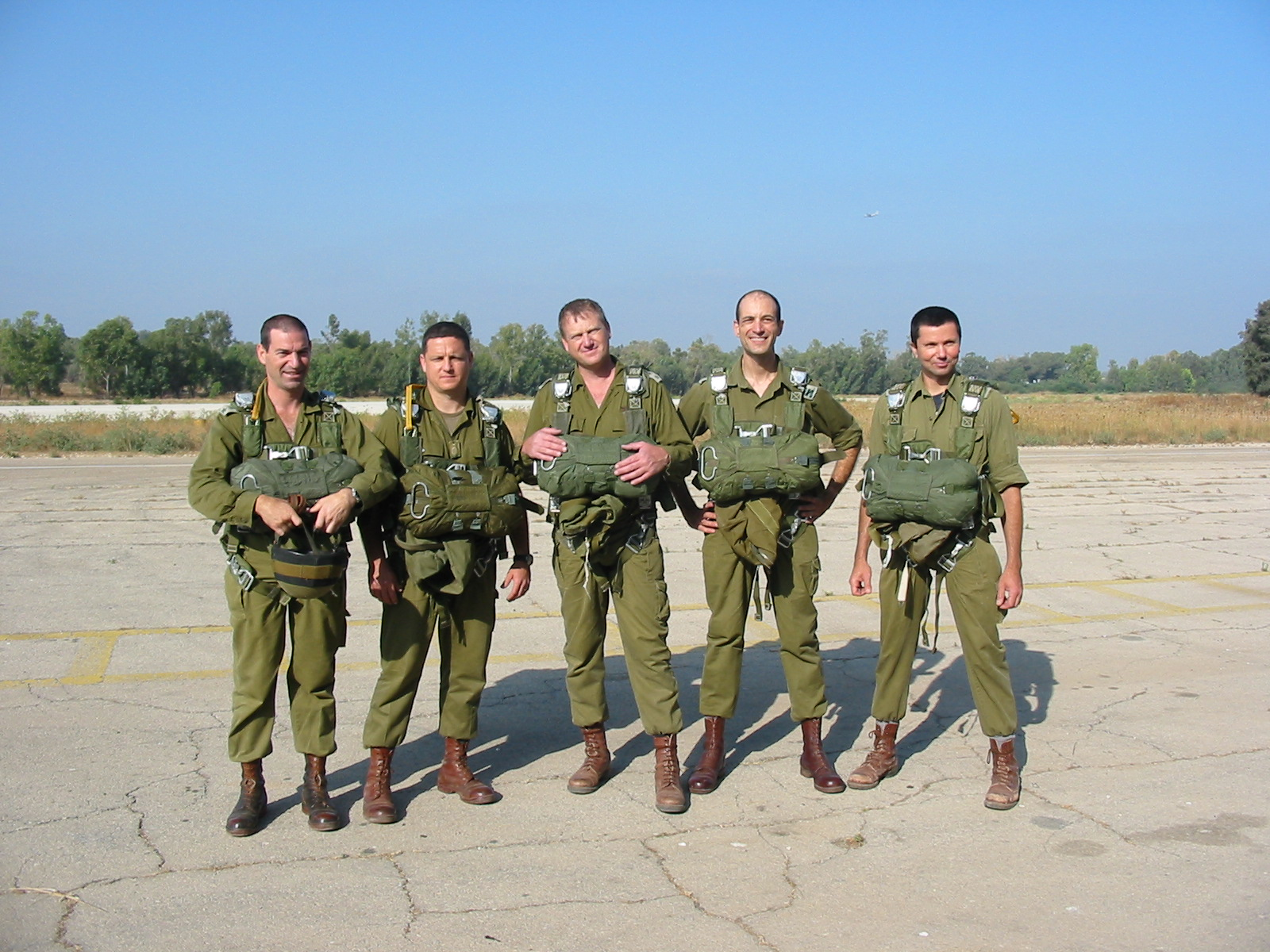
Israeli officers in reserve duty before parachuting exercise. Reserve service may continue until the age of 51

After personnel complete their regular service, the IDF may call up men for:

- reserve service of up to one month annually, until the age of 40–45 (reservists may volunteer after this age)
- active duty immediately in times of crisis

In most cases, the reserve duty is carried out in the same unit for years, in many cases the same unit as the active service and by the same people. Many soldiers who have served together in active service continue to meet in reserve duty for years after their discharge, causing reserve duty to become a strong male bonding experience in Israeli society.

Although still available for call-up in times of crisis, most Israeli men, and virtually all women, do not actually perform reserve service in any given year. Units do not always call up all of their reservists every year, and a variety of exemptions are available if called for regular reserve service. Virtually no exemptions exist for reservists called up in a time of crisis, but experience has shown that in such cases (most recently, the 2006 Lebanon War) exemptions are rarely requested or exercised; units generally achieve recruitment rates above those considered fully staffed.

=== Singapore ===
All male able-bodied Singapore citizens and second-generation permanent residents upon reaching the age of 18 are obliged by law to serve National Service compulsorily as a national duty to defend the Singapore city-state island. They must serve a mandatory two-year active period as Full-Time National Servicemen (NSFs), deployed to the Singapore Armed Forces (SAF), Singapore Police Force (SPF), or the Singapore Civil Defence Force (SCDF).

When a Singapore conscript completes his active service, he attains the status of being an "operationally ready" citizen-soldier, and is thereafter known as an Operationally-Ready National Serviceman (NSman). NSmen are the equivalent of other militaries' reservists. The slight difference in nomenclature is as to these NSmen will form the main fighting personnel of the Singapore Armed Forces upon wartime or any national exigencies. In practice, Operationally-Ready NSmen of all the tri-service (SAF, SPF and SCDF) are all routinely called up annually for reservist duty until they complete their reservist cycle obligations or upon the legally statutory discharge age of 40 for Warrant Officers, Specialists and Enlistees (WOSEs) and 50 for Officers.

=== Spain ===
Reservistas Voluntarios (Volunteer Reservists) provide the Spanish Armed Forces (Army, Navy and Air Force) branches of qualified civilian professionals essentially required for each army. The training is divided in two phases. The first stage it is the Basic Training in military knowledge. The time for this phase are normally two weeks. The second stage, which typical time are one week, it is the Specific Training, in this phase the applicant for Reservist develop the specific tasks in his military unit.

When the Applicant approve the two stages acquires the Reservist title and the rank of Soldier, Sergeant or Second Lieutenant (Alférez). The time of the Reservist commitment is three years, with extensions until 58 years of age for Officers and NCO and 55 years old for ordinary soldiers.

=== United Kingdom ===
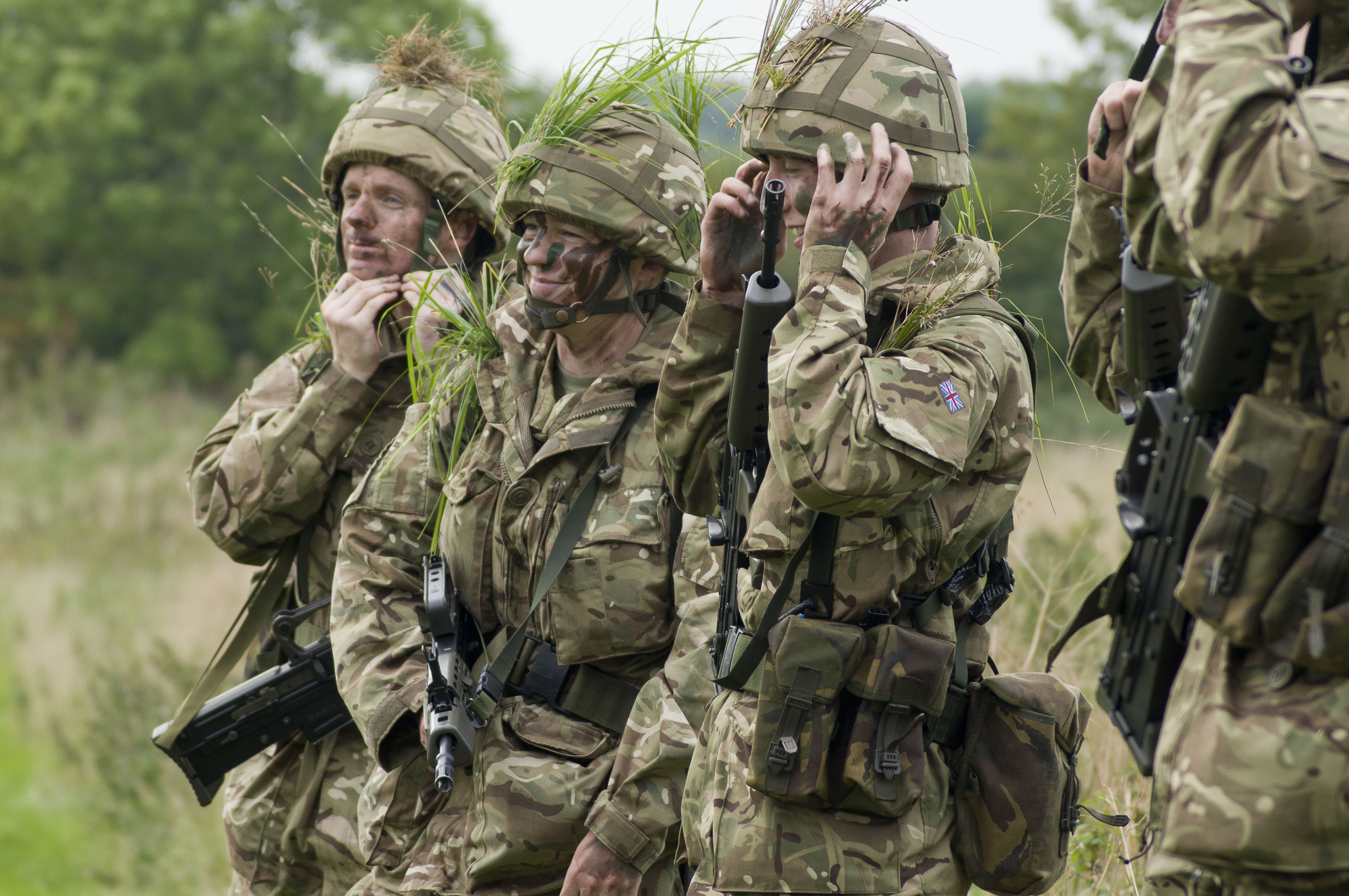
British Army Reservists applying camouflage during a training exercise.

All three branches of the British Armed Forces have volunteer reserves. Reservists hold civilian jobs and train on a stipulated number of weekends monthly. They are generally assigned to an administrative corps or specialist trade according to their occupations and location in the country.

- Army Reserve
- Royal Naval Reserve and Royal Marines Reserve
- Royal Auxiliary Air Force

=== United States ===
Five of the six branches of the United States Armed Forces have their own Reserve Forces, whose reservists can be called upon to serve:

- United States Army Reserve
- Marine Forces Reserve
- United States Navy Reserve
- Air Force Reserve Command
- United States Coast Guard Reserve

As of 2021, the United States Space Force has neither a reserve component nor a National Guard component, and part-time space personnel are contained in the Air National Guard and the Air Force Reserve.

The United States National Guard, which is under dual federal and state control, is traditionally intended for homeland defense and domestic disaster relief. However, large numbers were deployed into combat during the Global War on Terrorism, and in 2005 National Guard personnel made up 41 percent of all troops deployed to Iraq. The National Guard is divided into the following:

- Army National Guard (U.S. Army)
- Air National Guard (U.S. Air Force).

During peacetime, Reservists and National Guardsmen spend a minimum of one weekend a month, two weeks a year annually in training. Reservists and National Guardsmen in front tier combat organizations, such as aviation units flying combat aircraft and combat support aircraft, will be funded for additional military drill duty or active duty for training in order to maintain skill levels. They may also perform additional duty in support of the active duty forces and/or in lieu of their active duty counterparts.

Some states also maintain non-federal state defense forces as a small reserve for their National Guard units. These units cannot be deployed beyond the borders of their states and cannot be federalized.
