= National Service Training Program =

Philippine civic education program

The National Service Training Program (NSTP) is a civic education and defense preparedness program for students instituted by the government of the Philippines on January 23, 2002, by virtue of Republic Act No. 9163, otherwise known as the "National Service Training Program (NSTP) Act of 2001."

== Coverage ==
Under the NSTP Program, both male and female college students of any bachelor's degree course or technical vocational course in public or private higher educational institutions are obliged to undergo one of three program components for an academic period of two semesters. The students, however, are free to choose which particular program component to take. The three NSTP Program components are:

- Civic Welfare Training Service (CWTS)

This program component is designed to provide students with activities contributory to the general welfare and betterment of life of the members of the community especially those developed to improve social welfare services.

- Literacy Training Service (LTS)

This program component is designed to train students in teaching literacy and numeracy skills to schoolchildren and out-of-school youths. The hope is to continue learning on a peer-to-peer interaction.

- Reserve Officers' Training Corps (ROTC)

This program component is designed to provide military education and training for students to mobilize them for national defense preparedness. This is also a glimpse for young people to see how military life is and encourage them into service.

Graduates of the ROTC program component are organized into the Citizen Armed Force, while graduates of the LTS and CWTS program components are organized into the National Service Reserve Corps (NSRC) administered by the Department of National Defense (DND), the Commission on Higher Education (CHED) and Technical Education and Skills Development Authority (TESDA).

== Precedents ==
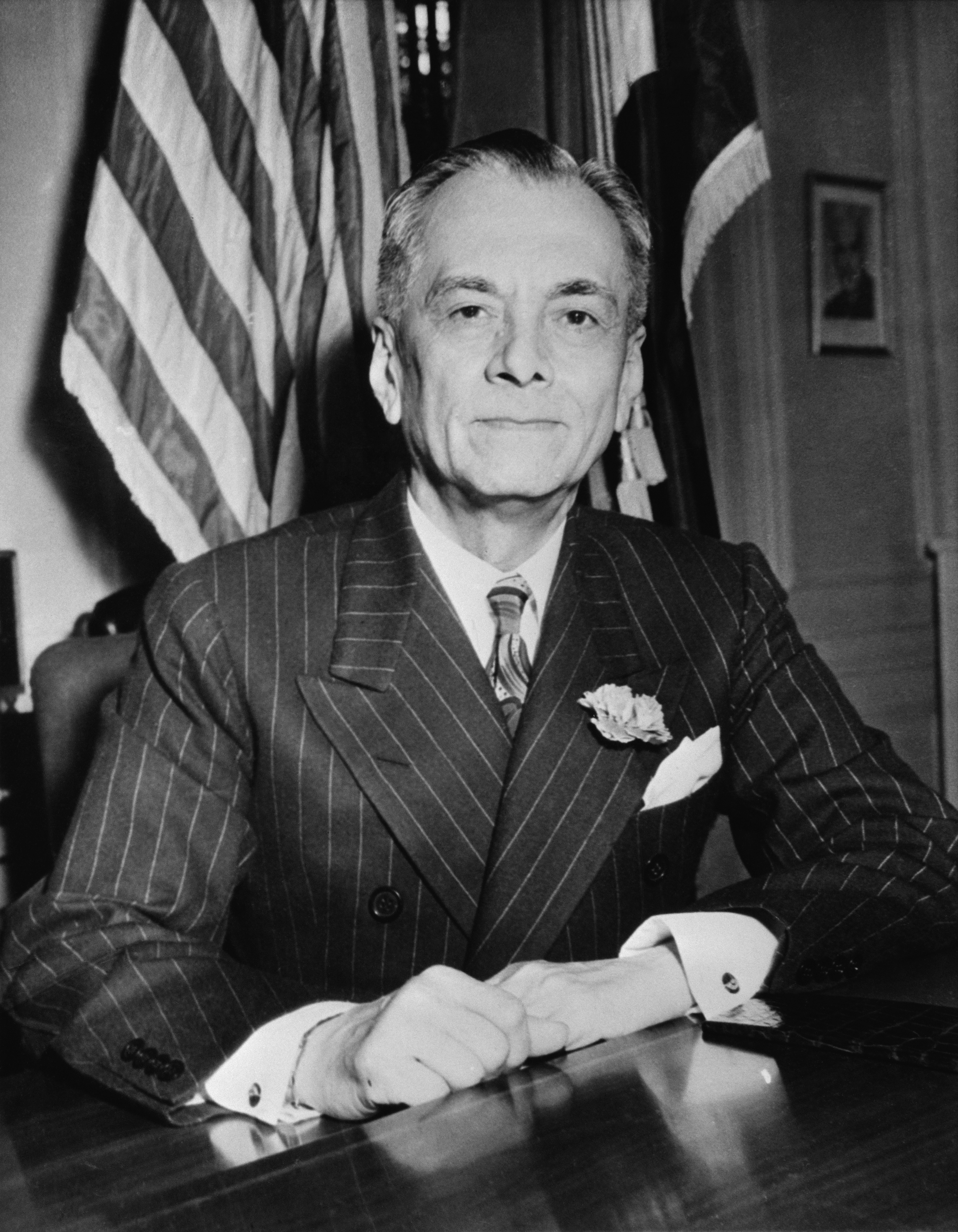
President Manuel Quezon controlled the National Assembly which enacted the National Defense Act of 1935

There have been several legal precedents to the National Service Training Program (NSTP) Act of 2001. These include:

=== Commonwealth Act No. 1 ===
Commonwealth Act No. 1, otherwise known as the "National Defense Act", was enacted by the National Assembly of the Philippines on December 21, 1935. It provided for obligatory military service for all male citizens of ages between 18 and 30.

=== Presidential Decree No. 1706 ===
Presidential Decree No. 1706, otherwise known as the "National Service Law", was signed into law on August 8, 1980. It made national service obligatory for all Filipino citizens and specified three categories of national service: civic welfare service, law enforcement service and military service.

=== Republic Act 7077 ===
Republic Act 7077, otherwise known as the "Citizen Armed Forces of the Philippines Reservist Act", was enacted by the 8th Congress of the Philippines on June 27, 1991. The Reservist Act provided for organization, training and utilization of reservists, referred to in the Act as "Citizen Soldiers". The primary pool of manpower for the reservist organization are graduates of the Reserve Officers' Training Corps basic and advance courses.

== Statistics ==
According to the Commission on Higher Education, over a ten-year period from 2002-2012 the CWTS component has produced 10,614,000 graduates, the highest among the three NSTP components. This is followed by the ROTC component, with 1,435,000 AFP reservists and the LTS component with 538,700 graduates.

A comparison of the number of NSTP graduates per component, 2002-2012
NSTP Component	No. of Graduates
CWTS	10,614,000
LTS	538,700
ROTC	1,435,000

== See also ==
- National Service Reserve Corps
- Conscription in the Philippines
- Death of Mark Chua
