= Reserve Officers' Training Corps (Philippines) =

Military training program

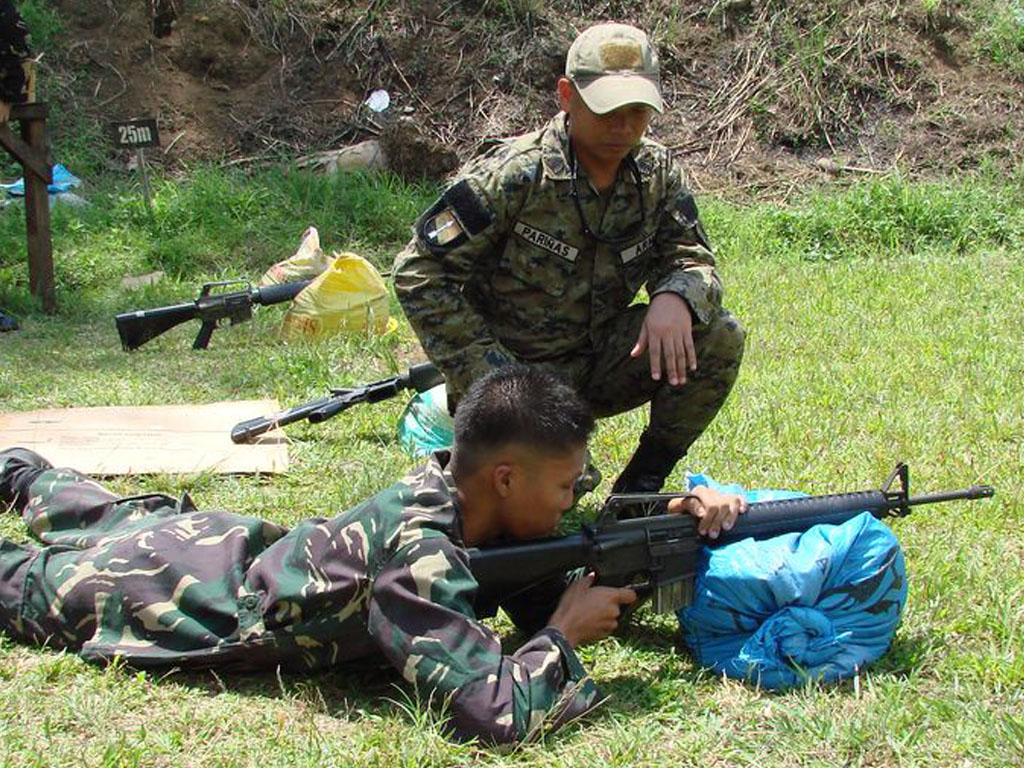
A soldier of the 1st Scout Ranger Regiment of the Philippine Army instructs an ROTC cadet officer on the finer points of the M16 rifle

Reserve Officers' Training Corps (ROTC) is one of three components of the National Service Training Program (NSTP), the civic education and defense preparedness program for higher and vocational education students in the Philippines. ROTC aims to provide military education and training for students to mobilize them for national defense preparedness. Its specific objectives include preparation of college students for service in the Armed Forces of the Philippines in the event of an emergency and their training to become reservists and potential commissioned officers of the AFP.

Graduates of the ROTC advance program serve in all branches of the Armed Forces of the Philippines. In 2008, ROTC graduates of the officer candidate schools of the various services constituted roughly 75% of the AFP officer corps. The ROTC grants qualified student-cadets scholarship benefits through a merit-based incentive program in return for an obligation of military service in the reserve force, or active duty in the AFP if given the opportunity, after graduation.

ROTC student-cadets attend college like other students, but also receive basic military training and officer training from the branch of service that handles their school's ROTC unit. The students participate in regular ROTC instruction during the school year (one school year for Basic ROTC student-cadets and three school years for Advance ROTC cadet-officers), and extended training activities during the summer, such as the ROTC Summer Camp Training (RSCT) and the Advance ROTC Academic Phase Training (ARAPT).

ROTC units in colleges and universities are organized through the Department of Military Science and Tactics (DMST) which is under joint supervision by the school administration and the Department of National Defense. These ROTC units are in turn managed by active duty officers of the AFP and the reservist organization representatives of the major services, the Philippine Army Reserve Command of the Philippine Army, the Philippine Navy Reserve Command of the Philippine Navy and the Philippine Air Force Reserve Command of the Philippine Air Force.

== Nomenclature ==
Commonwealth Act No. 1, the National Defense Act of 1935, referred to the ROTC as the "Reserve Officers Training Corps", whereas Republic Act No. 7077, the Citizen Armed Forces of the Philippines Reservist Act of 1991, referred to the ROTC as the "Reserve Officers' Training Corps", ascribing the possessive form to the word "officers".

Republic Act No. 9163, the National Service Training Program Act of 2001 likewise uses the same possessive form as RA 7077.

== History ==
ROTC in the Philippines began in 1912 when the Philippine Constabulary commenced with military instruction at the University of the Philippines. The university's Board of Regents then made representations to the United States Department of War through the Governor-General and received the services of a United States Army officer who took on the duties of a professor of Military Science. Through this arrangement, the first official ROTC unit in the Philippines was established in the University of the Philippines on July 3, 1922.

In 1921, National University became the first private college in the Philippines to have an ROTC unit. Later in the same year, Ateneo de Manila University, Liceo de Manila, and Colegio de San Juan de Letran soon followed suit and organized their own respective ROTC units. In 1936, the Office of the Superintendent for ROTC Units under the Philippine Army was activated to supervise all ROTC units in the country.

=== National Defense Act of 1935 ===
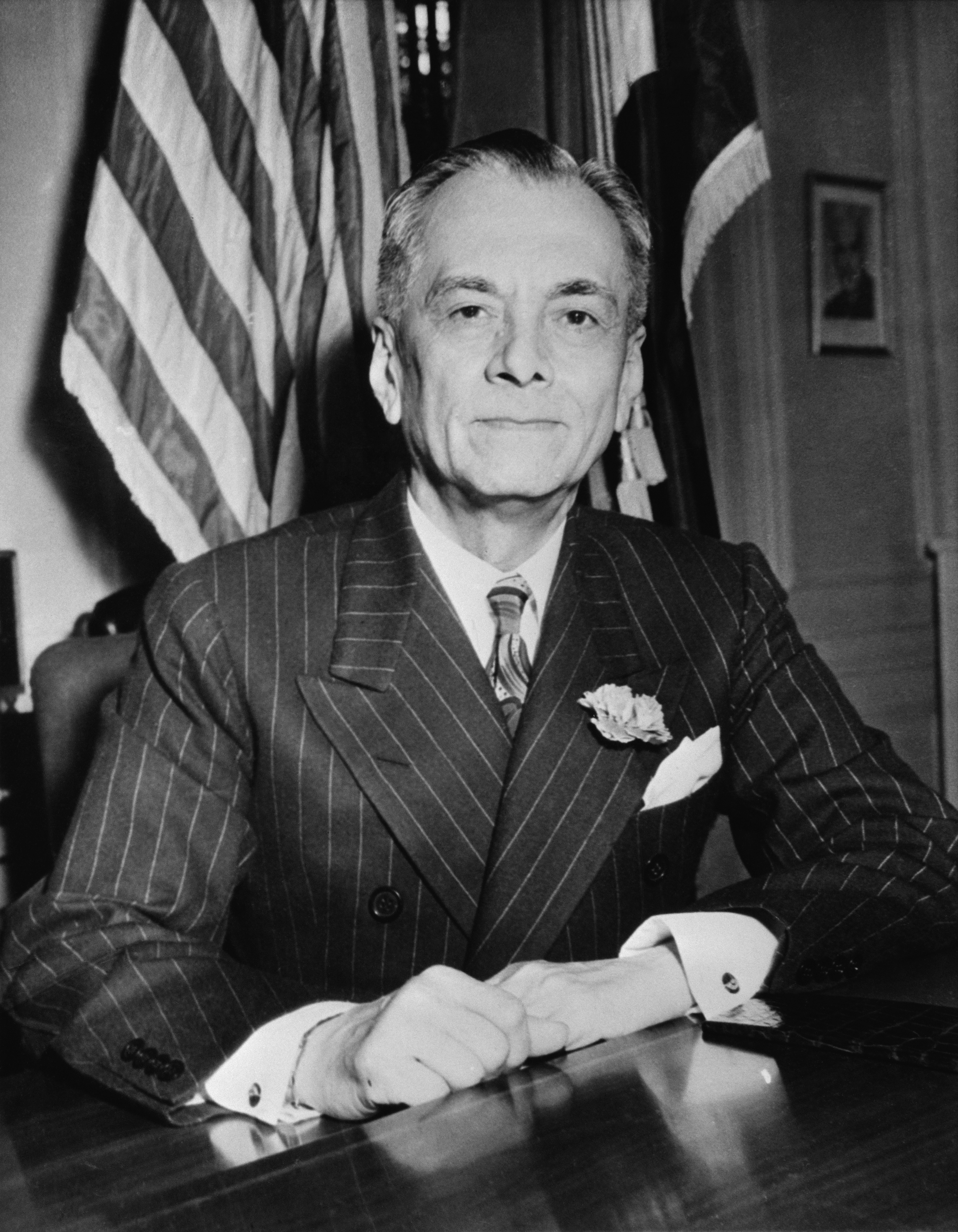
President Manuel Quezon controlled the National Assembly which enacted the National Defense Act of 1935

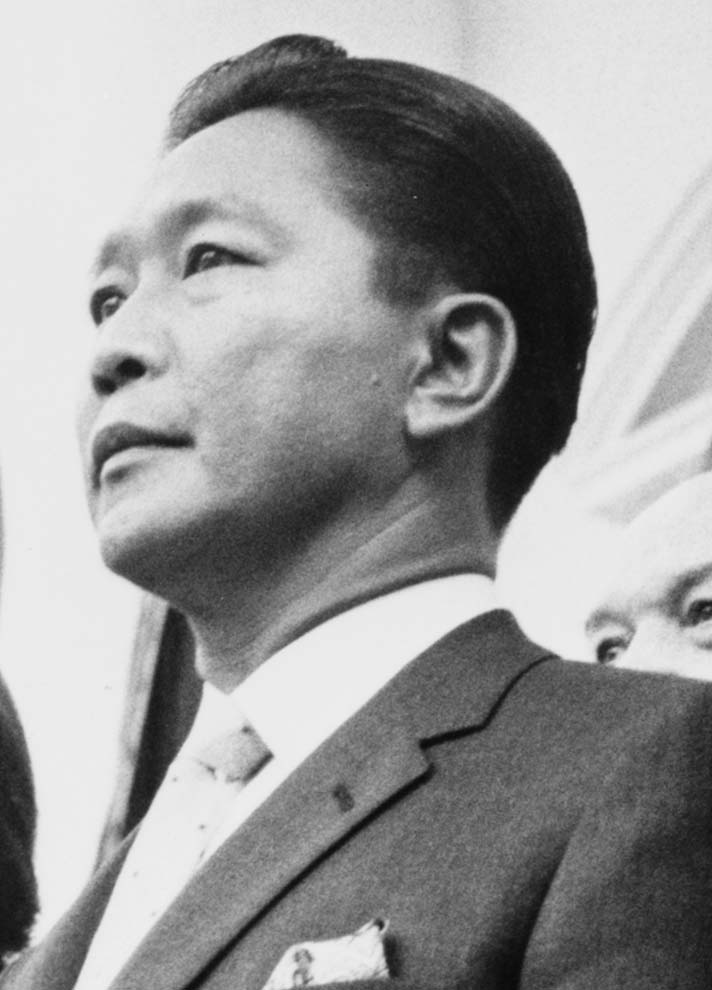
President Ferdinand Marcos issued Presidential Decree No. 1706 in 1980

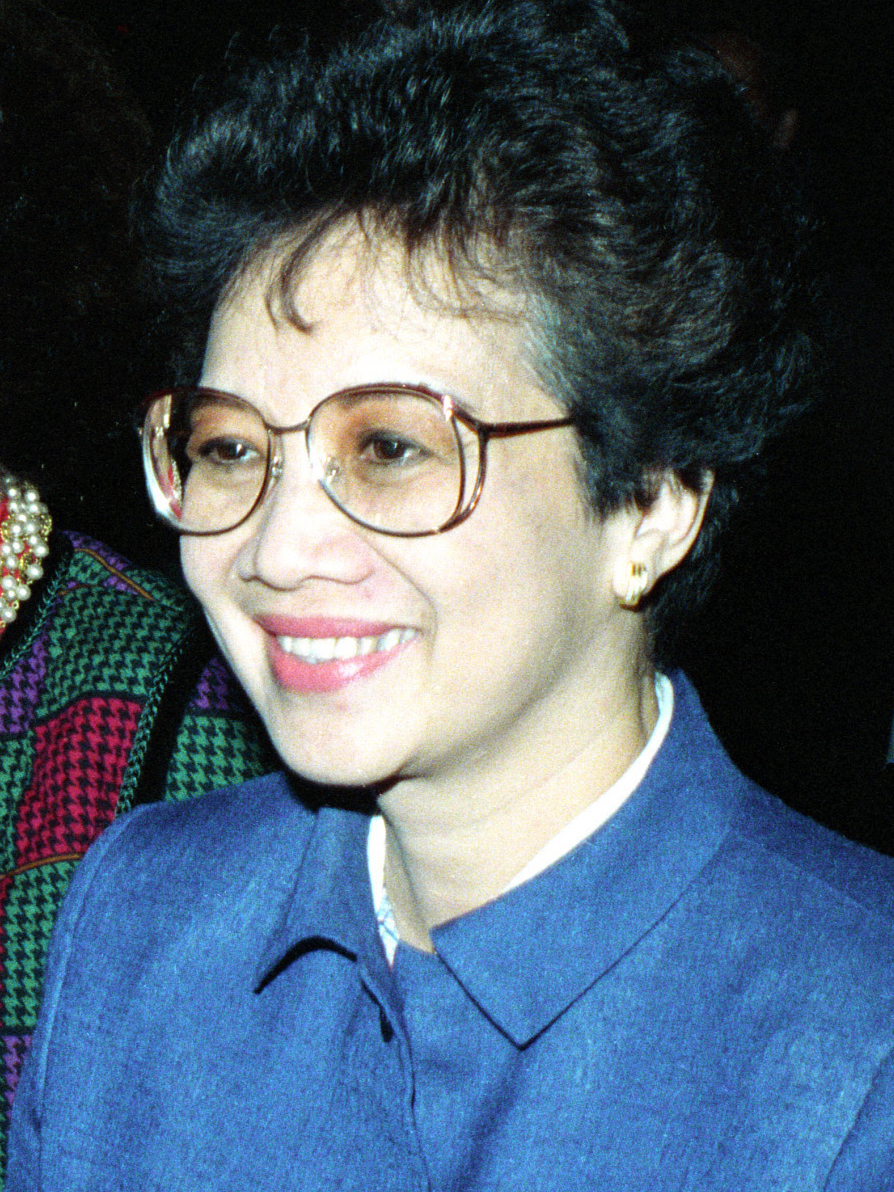
President Corazon Aquino signed Republic Act 7077 into law in 1991

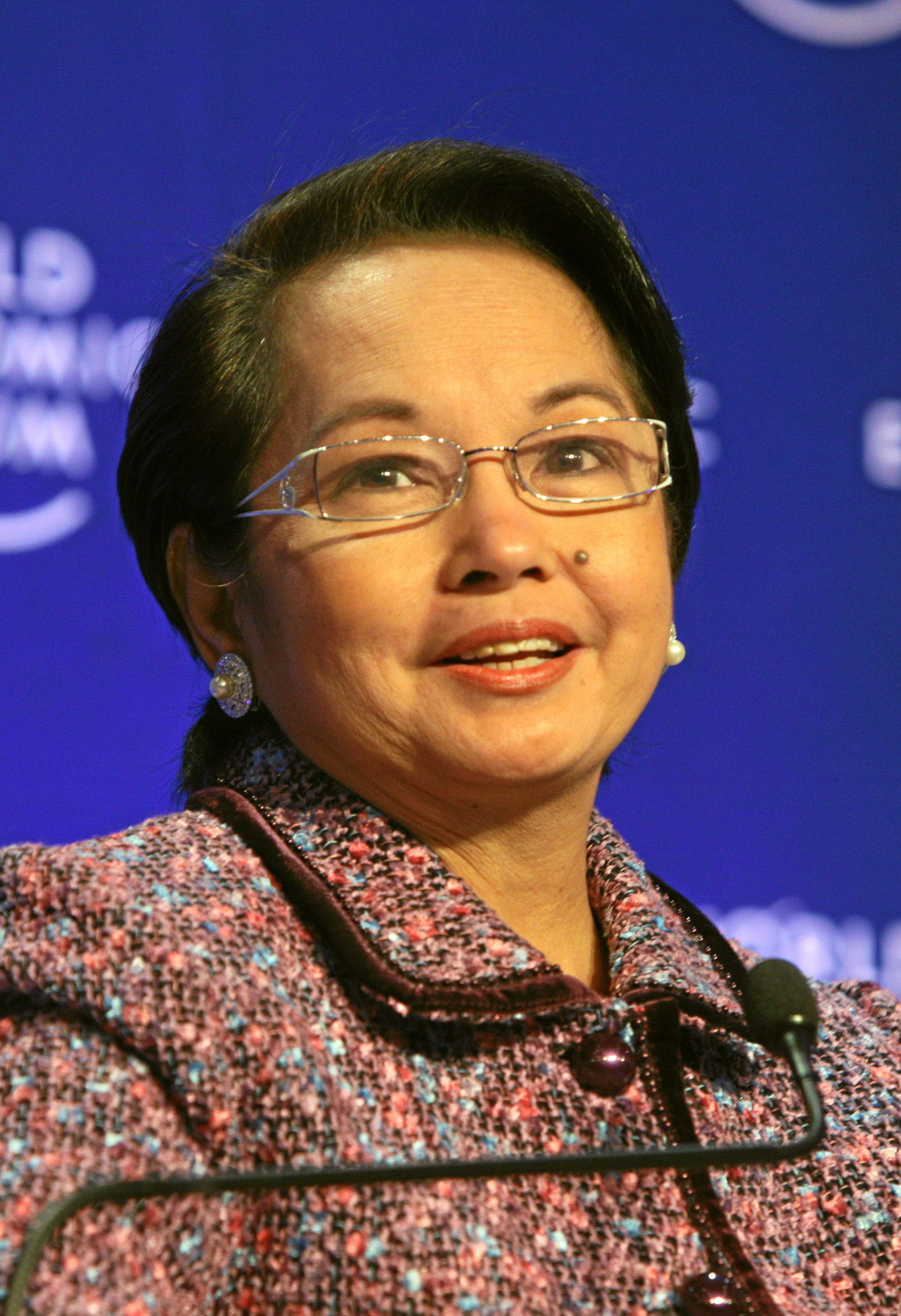
President Gloria Macapagal Arroyo signed Republic Act 9163 into law in 2002

President Manuel L. Quezon issued Executive Order No. 207 in 1939 in order to implement the National Defense Act of 1935, otherwise known as Commonwealth Act No. 1, the embodiment of the national defense plan formulated by General Douglas MacArthur for the Philippine Commonwealth. This executive order made ROTC obligatory at all colleges and universities with a total enrollment of 100 students and greater. This measure was made in order to help fill out the reserve force requirement of 400,000 men by 1946 and especially for junior reserve officers.

=== World War II ===
At the onset of World War II in 1941, thirty-three colleges and universities in the Philippines had organized ROTC units, the cadets and officers of which would see action for the first time. Elements from different ROTC units in Metro Manila took part in the Battle of Bataan. ROTC cadets of Silliman University in the Visayas made up 45% of the strength of the 75th Infantry Regiment of the United States Army Forces in the Far East (USAFFE). Various ROTC units joined volunteers from the Philippine Military Academy to form the Hunters ROTC guerrilla group, which took part in the resistance movement during the Japanese occupation after the last American and Filipino forces had surrendered.

=== Post-World War II ===
On September 13, 1946, the Philippine Army Headquarters reactivated the pre-war ROTC units. The Philippine Army became the Armed Forces of the Philippines on December 23, 1950, at which time the Philippines was divided into four military areas and ROTC units operating within these areas fell under the supervision of their respective Area Commanders. On February 8, 1967, President Ferdinand Marcos rescinded Executive Order No. 207 of 1939, promulgating Executive Order No. 59 in its place. This executive order made ROTC mandatory at all colleges, universities, and other institutions with an enrollment of 250 male students and greater. President Marcos also issued Presidential Decree No. 1706, otherwise known as the "National Service Law", on August 8, 1980. It made national service obligatory for all Filipino citizens and specified three categories of national service: civic welfare service, law enforcement service, and military service.

=== Republic Act 7077 ===
Republic Act 7077, otherwise known as the "Citizen Armed Forces of the Philippines Reservist Act", was enacted by the 8th Congress of the Philippines on June 27, 1991. The Reservist Act provided for the organization, training, and utilization of reservists, referred to in the Act as "Citizen Soldiers". The primary pool of manpower for the reservist organization is graduates of the ROTC basic and advanced courses.

== ROTC Games ==
The Commission on Higher Education along with the Armed Forces of the Philippines, the Philippine Sports Commission, and the office of Senator Francis Tolentino signed an agreement establishing the ROTC Games National Championships in December 2022. The finals of the first edition was held in October 2023.

== Controversy ==
A period of discontent over ROTC's conduct and the corruption that often plagued its individual units had long been fermenting prior to 2000. Filipino student websites often contain short essays regarding the alleged pointlessness of the program. Student groups would occasionally include ROTC in their roster of grievances, whereas lawmakers would introduce resolutions intended to abolish ROTC.

Into this national mood of resentment fell a tragedy that would have a significant impact on the Philippine ROTC program. Mark Welson Chua, a student of the University of Santo Tomas and a member of the UST ROTC unit, was found dead, his body floating in the Pasig River on March 18, 2001. Prior to his death, he and another student had reported an account of alleged corruption within the UST ROTC unit to the school's student publication. The National Bureau of Investigation would later conclude that members of the UST ROTC unit were responsible for Chua's death. One of the suspects would be sentenced to death three years later, although their death sentence was commuted when the Philippine government abolished the death penalty in 2006.

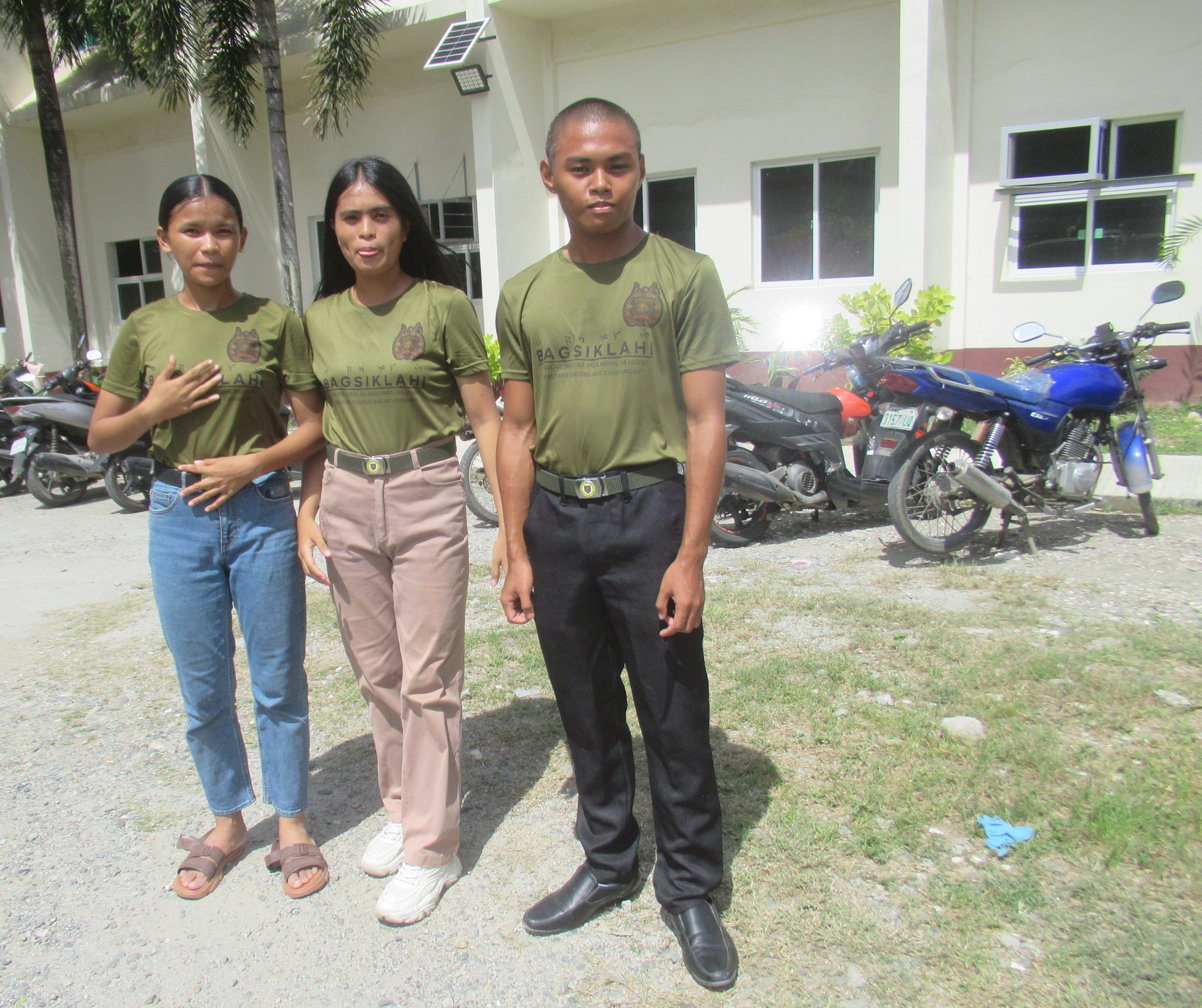
Bagsik-Lahi, ROTC NSTP BULSuBustos

The incident set off an explosion of anti-ROTC sentiment as student associations, school administrators and other cause-oriented groups focused on protests and parliamentary approaches to the matter. The Congress of the Philippines took up the legal challenge; generating no less than seventeen bills and resolutions in both houses of Congress, in response to the clamor. Many of the bills mentioned Mark Chua in the text, acknowledging his death as the catalyst for reform.

=== Republic Act 9163 ===
Republic Act 9163, otherwise known as the "National Service Training Program (NSTP) Act of 2001", was Congress' answer to the clamor for change in the ROTC program. It was promulgated by the 12th Congress of the Philippines on January 23, 2002. Under the NSTP Program, both male and female college students of any baccalaureate degree course or technical vocational course in public or private educational institutions are obliged to undergo one of three program components, one of which is ROTC, for an academic period of two semesters. However, ROTC as a pre-requisite for graduation was rescinded.

== Impact on Philippine society ==
The ROTC program of the Philippines was for many decades a compelling aspect affecting the lives of male youths, especially those who went in pursuit of college education. It was also a significant contributor to the officer corps of the Armed Forces of the Philippines (AFP).

=== Armed Forces of the Philippines ===
Composition of the Armed Forces of the Philippines Officer Corps as of 2008.
1. ROTC graduates (75.0%)
2. PMA graduates (25.0%)

As of 2008, ROTC graduates of the various services constituted roughly 75% of the AFP officer corps; the rest come from the ranks of the Philippine Military Academy. Among the more prominent graduates of the Philippine ROTC program are Gen. Alfredo M. Santos, Chief of Staff of the Armed Forces of the Philippines from 1962 to 1965 and the first four-star general of the AFP, Gen. Rigoberto J. Atienza, 9th Chief of Staff of the AFP and for whom Camp Atienza in Quezon City is named, and Gen. Romeo C. Espino, the longest-serving AFP Chief of Staff who served from January 15, 1972, to August 16, 1981. Gen. Santos was a civil engineering graduate of Mapua Institute of Technology and was the Corp Commander of the Mapua Institute of Technology Reserve Officers' Training Corps; Gen. Atienza, a civil engineering graduate of the University of the Philippines, and Gen. Espino an agriculture graduate of University of the Philippines Los Baños. Another notable ROTC graduate was Gen. Fabian C. Ver, AFP Chief of Staff under Ferdinand Marcos and director general of the National Intelligence and Security Authority.

=== Post-2001 ROTC ===
ROTC enrollment before and after 2001
School Year	Students enrolled in ROTC
1999-2000	800,000
2011-2012	150,000

School participation in the ROTC program
Year	Schools with active ROTC programs
Pre-2001	2,000
2011	500

At present, ROTC is no longer a mandatory program for college students, but an optional program component of the NSTP. The ROTC program accepts both male and female cadets. According to the latest available data, there has been a significant reduction in the number of students enrolling in ROTC. From more than 800,000 enrolled cadets during the 1999-2000 school year, ROTC enrollment has dropped to 150,000 as of 2011. During the first quarter of 2011, 500 colleges and universities were participating in the ROTC program. This is a sharp decline from the 2,000 schools offering ROTC before the National Service Training Program was enforced.

According to the Commission on Higher Education, the ROTC component of NSTP has produced 1,435,000 graduates over a ten-year period from 2002 to 2012. In comparison, the CWTS and LTS components of NSTP has produced 8,614,000 and 538,700 graduates respectively.

== Proposals for and against mandatory implementation ==
A comparison of the number of ROTC graduates against other NSTP component graduates, 2002-2012
NSTP Component	No. of Graduates
CWTS	8,614,000
LTS	538,700
ROTC	1,435,000

In 2006, Alfredo Lim sponsored Senate Bill 2224 and Representative Eduardo Gullas sponsored House Bill 5460, seeking to make ROTC again mandatory. In June 2013, Department of National Defense Secretary Voltaire Gazmin aired a proposal to make ROTC once again mandatory for college students, a move ardently being protested by progressive youth groups such as Anakbayan. There have also been reports of schools offering merchant marine courses that want to retain the ROTC program as mandatory, arguing that maritime companies prefer mariners with ROTC training.

Members of the House of Representatives of the 16th Congress of the Philippines have filed at least six house bills related to the ROTC program. Congressmen Francis Abaya, Rodolfo Biazon, Erico Aumentado, Sherwin Gatchalian and Manny Pacquiao have proposed reinstating the mandatory nature of ROTC training, while Kabataan Party-list representative Terry Ridon has proposed the outright abolishment of the program.

In February 2017, President Rodrigo Duterte approved the proposal to revive the mandatory nature of ROTC training for senior high school students in both public and private schools. Duterte certified the proposal as urgent and forwarded it to the Congress of the Philippines - House of Representatives (Lower House) and Senate (Upper House). On May 20, 2019, the Lower House passed their version of the proposed law. Some camps have criticized Duterte's inclination on this issue for admitting in a speech in 2016 that he himself did not finish his supposed ROTC service during his university days, and two years later, expounded that he even falsified medical documents to be able to do so.

After the 2022 presidential elections, Vice President-elect Sara Duterte stated that she wants mandatory ROTC training under priority legislation. In July, Senators Francis Tolentino and Robin Padilla announced support for a bill by Senator Ronald Dela Rosa that would introduce mandatory ROTC for students in grades 11 and 12, with a voluntary advanced ROTC program available for the first two years of higher education. President Bongbong Marcos stated in his first State of the Nation address, also in July, that reinstituting the ROTC as a mandatory component of senior high school programs in all public and private tertiary-level educational institutions is one of his priority bills.

Groups such as the Student Christian Movement of the Philippines denounced Marcos, Jr. for prioritizing the reinstitution of mandatory Reserve Officers' Training Corps as was said in his 2022 State of the Nation Address, saying that it will teach students blind obedience and make them vulnerable to abuses.

== Notable Philippine ROTC units ==
- The University of the Philippines Diliman ROTC Unit
- University of Santo Tomas Golden Corps of Cadets
- Polytechnic University of the Philippines ROTC Unit
- De La Salle University-Manila 247th Naval ROTC Unit
- Mapúa Institute of Technology ROTC Unit
- FEATI University ROTC Unit
- Ateneo de Manila University ROTC Unit 131st Department of Air Science and Tactics
- Silliman University ROTC Unit
- Rizal Technological University ROTC Unit

== See also ==
- Conscription in the Philippines
- Student Regiment (Indonesia)
- Reserve Officer Training Unit (Malaysia)
- Reserve Officers' Training Corps (South Korea)
- Reserve Officers' Training Corps (Taiwan)
- University Regiments (Australia)
- Officers' Training Corps (United Kingdom)
- Reserve Officers' Training Corps (United States)
