= Second Congressional Commission on Education =

Philippine Congressional entity

- EDCOM II
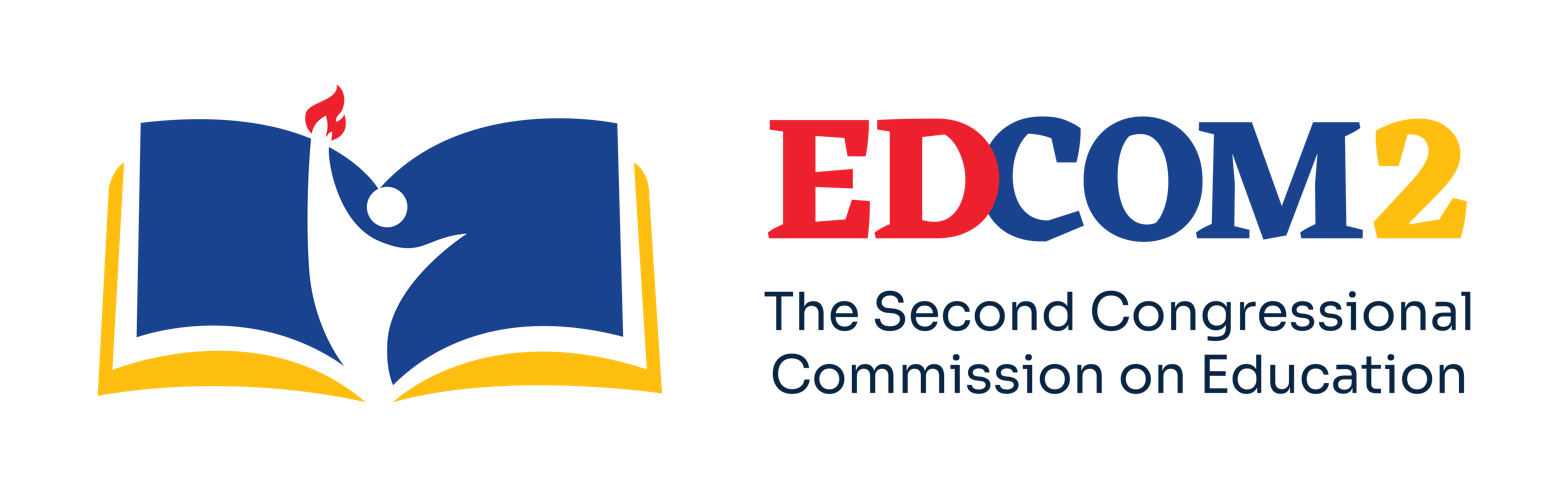
- The EDCOM 2 Logo
- Abbreviation: EDCOM II
- Predecessor: Education Commission of 1991
- Founder: Congress of the Philippines
- Founded at: Philippines
- Type: Commission
- Purpose: Policy research and reforms on the Philippine education system
- Location: Philippines
- Executive Director: Karol Mark Yee, Executive Director
- Key people: Senator Bam Aquino, Senator Alan Peter Cayetano, Representative Roman Romulo, Representative Jude Acidre
- Parent organization: Congress of the Philippines
- Website: https://www.edcom2.gov.ph/

The Second Congressional Commission on Education (EDCOM II) is a Philippine Congressional entity created by the 18th Congress of the Philippines.

== Overview and History ==
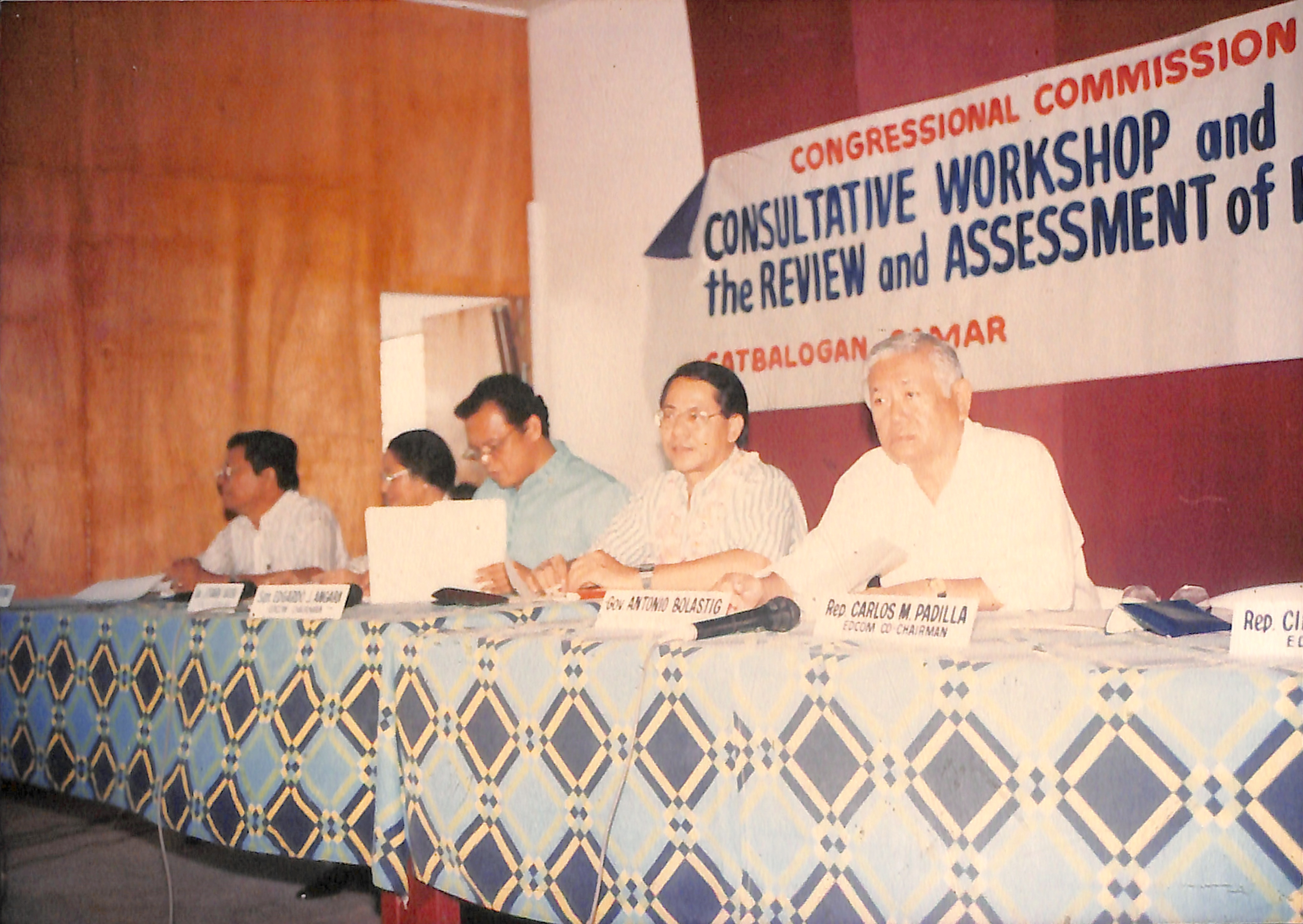
Officials of the first Education Commission in Catbalogan, Eastern Samar in 1991

The body was created by virtue of Republic Act (RA) 11899, which lapsed into law on July 23, 2022.

The commission is tasked to conduct a national review of the country's education sector after the COVID-19 pandemic exacted a heavy toll on learning. Its primary goal is to recommend legislation and policies to address the "learning crisis" and improve the quality of education in the Philippines.

On March 5, 2026, Bongbong Marcos signed an EDCOM II extension for two years.

=== The Education Commission of 1991 ===
The first Education Commission was established in 1991. It was tasked with assessing the state of Philippine education and recommending reforms. The commission's findings highlighted issues like low investment, disparities in access, low achievement, and high dropout rates. These findings led to significant changes, including the "trifocalization" of basic education and the creation of CHED and TESDA.

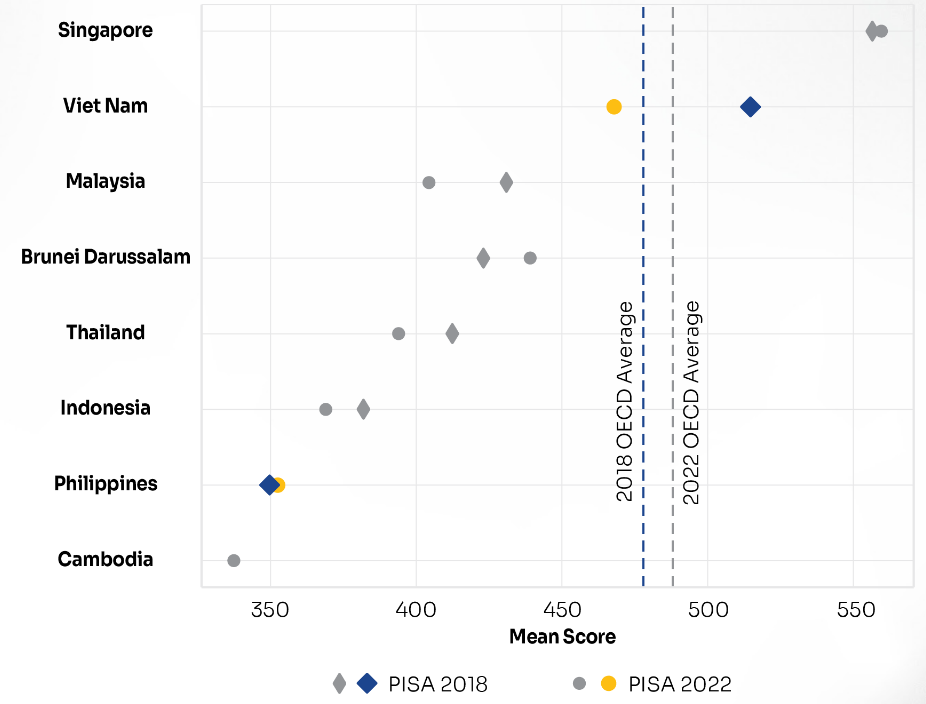
Grade 10 Filipinos scored lowest among all ASEAN countries in Math, Reading, and Science, besting only Cambodia, with more than 75% of our learners scoring lower than Level 2, or the minimum level of proficiency in Math, Reading, and Science.

=== Results of international assessments ===
The Philippines participated in the Programme for International Student Assessment for the first time in 2018. The country scored the lowest in reading comprehension and the second-lowest in mathematics and science, among 79 participating countries. A report by the World Bank also found that the Philippines’ learning poverty ranks among the highest in the Asian region, at 90.9%. The country fared the worst among the ASEAN countries, with the exception of Lao PDR (97.7%) and Brunei (no assessment). This means that nine in every 10 Filipinos aged 10 years old need to be taught how to read and to develop their reading comprehension.

The commission was formed as a result of these international assessments, spurred by widespread calls to reform the country's education system.

== Mandate and Objectives ==
Under Section 3 of RA 11899, the objectives of EDCOM II are to:

- Set specific, targeted, measurable and time-bound solutions that are products of a comprehensive assessment and evaluation, effective planning, and strategic investments in education;
- Develop a more holistic, harmonized and coordinated education ecosystem, through a review of the mandates of the three (3) agencies of education, namely: the Department of Education (DepEd), the Commission on Higher Education (CHED), and the Technical Education and Skills Development Authority (TESDA);
- Prioritize the adoption of digital transformation in education, and the use of science, technology and innovation through the promotion of digital literacy, and development of critical thinking, problem-solving and other related core competencies at par with global standards;
- Promote the development of 21st-century skills, including creativity, communication, collaboration, social skills, leadership, and initiative;
- Institutionalize educational reforms necessary to meet the new challenges to education, such as the implementation of alternative learning and delivery modes for basic education, higher education and post-secondary technical-vocational education and training as part of the adjustments and responses to the global pandemic, and the advent of the Fourth Industrial Revolution characterized, among others, by digital revolution or the rapid development of information technology such as artificial intelligence, automation, data analytics, blockchain data sharing, quantum computing, and internet of things analytics; and
- Recommend the adoption and institutionalization of relevant and meaningful assessment tools, such as teaching and learning competencies assessment tools, based on the best global practices which shall be used by educational agencies and institutions for their continued monitoring, evaluation, and development.

The Commission's principal mandate is identified in Section 4:

"To undertake a comprehensive national assessment and evaluation of the performance of the Philippine education sector for the purpose of recommending transformative, concrete and targeted reforms in the sector with the end in view of making the Philippines globally competitive in both education and labor markets."

== Composition ==
The Education Commission is headed by four co-chairpersons who lead the commission jointly – two from the Senate of the Philippines, and two from the House of Representatives.

In total, the commission has ten members, with five members from the Senate and five members from the House of Representatives.

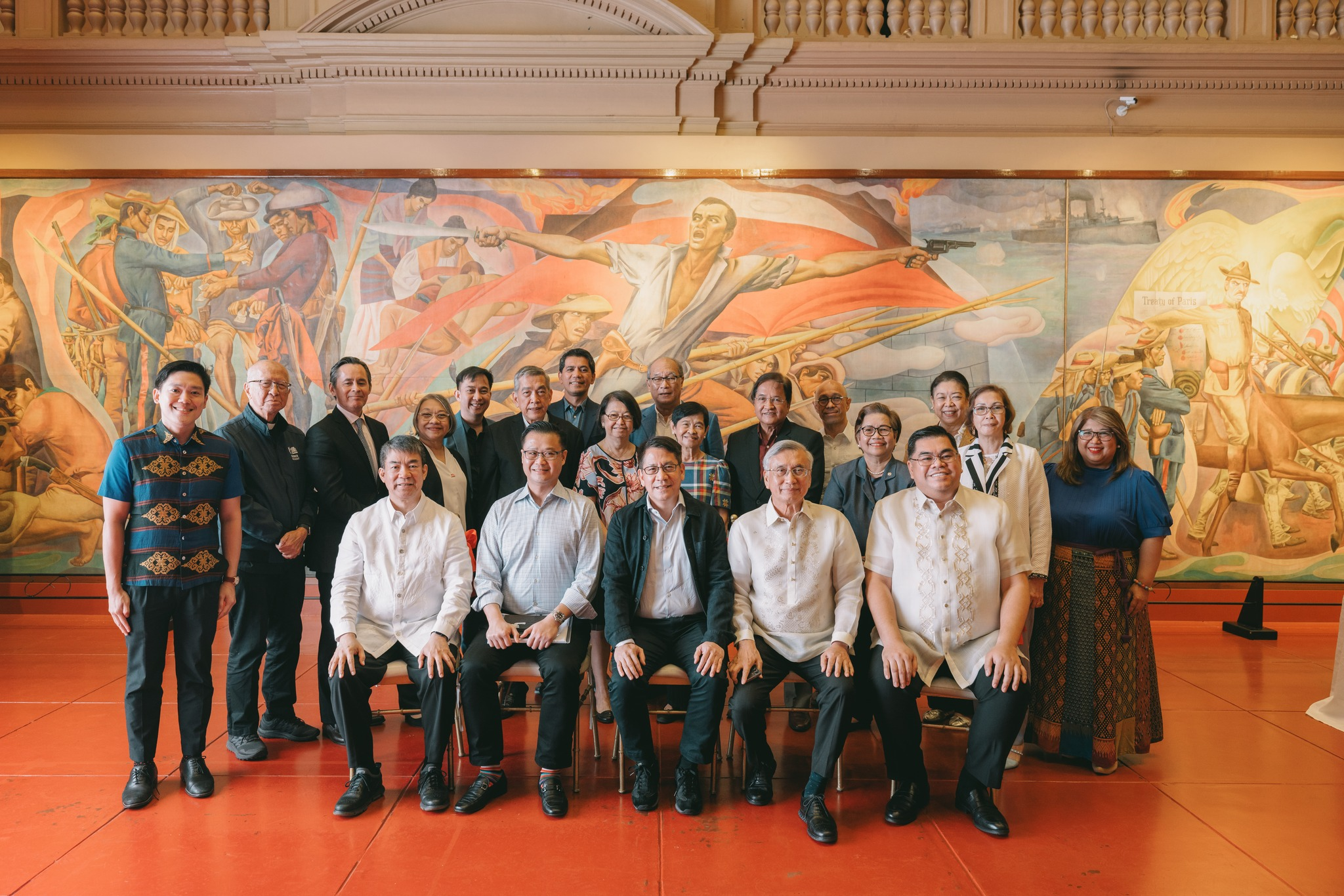
EDCOM 2 Commissioners from the 19th Congress, with Advisory Council Members

=== Members ===
The Second Congressional Commission on Education (EDCOM II) is composed of the following legislators from the 20th Congress of the Philippines:

==== Co-Chairpersons ====
- Senator Bam Aquino
- Senator Joel Villanueva
- Representative Roman Romulo
- Representative Jude Acidre

==== Commissioners ====
- Senator Sherwin Gatchalian
- Senator Loren Legarda
- Senator JV Ejercito
- Representative Steve Solon
- Representative Zia Alonto Adiong
- Representative Anna Veloso-Tuazon

===== Former Commissioners =====
- Senator Alan Peter Cayetano, from 2024 to 2026
- Senator Pia Cayetano, from 2023 to 2024
- Senator Koko Pimentel, from 2024 to 2025
- Senator Juan Edgardo Angara, from 2023 to 2024
- Senator Francis Joseph Escudero, from 2023 to 2025
- Representative Mark Go, from 2023 to 2025
- Representative Kiko Benitez. from 2023 to 2024
- Representative Khalid Dimaporo, from 2023 to 2025
- Representative Pablo John Garcia, from 2023 to 2025

==== Advisory Council ====
The commission is guided by an Education, Legislation and Policy Advisory Council, selected by the Senate President and the Speaker of the House of Representatives from a pool of recognized experts from the following sectors: the academe, the business sector, government education agencies, heads of LGUs, and from civil society organizations and development partners engaged in education. The members of the council are:

- Fr. Bienvenido Nebres, S.J., former president of Ateneo de Manila University
- Dr. Maria Cynthia Rose Bautista, former vice president for academic affairs of the University of the Philippines
- Alfredo Ayala, president of iPeople Group of Schools
- Dr. Chito Salazar, president and CEO of PHINMA Education
- Dr. Rhodora Angela Ferrer, executive director of PEAC
- Irene Isaac, former director general of TESDA
- Mayor Vico Sotto, Mayor of Pasig City
- Mayor Lani Cayetano, Mayor of Taguig City

==== Technical secretariat ====
- Dr. Karol Mark Yee serves as executive director of the EDCOM 2 Technical Secretariat

== Selected findings ==
Priority Area	Selected Findings
Early Childhood Care and Development (ECCD)	The Philippines has one of the highest prevalence of l stunting under-five in the world at 26.7%, greater than the global average of 22.3%.
Early Childhood Care and Development (ECCD)	Early childhood education is not equally accessible throughout the country. Despite RA 6972 of 1990 requiring each province, city, or municipality to establish a daycare center in every barangay, only 36% have at least 1 CDC/day care, or 15,207 out of 42,027 barangays in the country.
Early Childhood Care and Development (ECCD)	5,800 barangays remain without a child development center
Early Childhood Care and Development (ECCD)	Most daycare teachers and workers are aging, are not trained in early childhood education, and hold non-permanent positions with an average pay of P5,000 per month.
Basic Education	Since 2012, only 27 textbooks have been procured for Grade 1 to Grade 10, despite substantial budget allocations.
Basic Education	Out of the 27 key stage assessments scheduled to be conducted from SY 2016–2017 to SY 2022–2023, 13 were delayed, and 11 were not administered at all.
Basic Education	Learners lose as much as 42 out of 88 school days due to calamities and natural disasters
Basic Education	The Philippines have a backlog of at least 165,000 classrooms
Teacher Education	Teachers continue to bear the burden of about 50 administrative and ancillary tasks, despite efforts to allow them to focus on teaching.
Teacher Education	Between 2009 and 2023, the average passing rate in the licensure examinations for elementary (33%) and secondary (40%) has been dismally low, when compared to passing rates in other professions.
Teacher Education	Enhancement of the Teacher Education Council (TEC) has been at a standstill for 2 years, despite the pressing need for necessary reforms. RA 11713, or the Excellence in Teacher Education Act was passed into law last April 27, 2022.
Teacher Education	62% of HS teachers are handling subjects they did not major in during college
Teacher Education	There is uneven allocation of non-teaching personnel
Teacher Education	Teacher promotions occur at an alarmingly slow rate. It takes an average of 15 years to progress from Teacher I to progress from Teacher I to Teacher III.
Teacher Education	Out of 45,199 public schools, 24,916 (54%) currently do not have principals, with thousands of schools not even having plantilla items
Higher Education	Most beneficiaries of the tertiary education subsidy were not the poorest. Between 2018 and 2022, the proportion of the poorest of the poor* declined markedly, from 74% to 31%. Instead, the majority of grantees were those in municipalities and cities without SUCs and LUCs (from 26% to 69%).
Higher Education	About 500,000 of the poorest high school graduates are not receiving support to attend college
Technical-Vocational Education and Training (TVET) and Lifelong Learning	The majority of students are enrolled in community-based training (CBT) programs, constituting 39% of the total TVET enrollment.
Technical-Vocational Education and Training (TVET) and Lifelong Learning	64% of programs with training regulations are low level (NC 1 & 2)
Governance and Financing	The staffing levels in CHED and TESDA have not kept pace with the growing responsibilities of the agencies and the increased investments in education from both the public and private sectors.
Governance and Financing	The failure to permanently establish a high-level coordinating body has resulted in a long-standing lack of effective coordination between the education agencies.
Governance and Financing	Budget allocated to education is increasing, but there is a tertiary tilt despite profound gaps in basic education
Governance and Financing	There is a marked disparity in SEF income among different types of LGUs.
Governance and Financing	Current levels of school MOOE budgets are insufficient to fully cover the operating costs of public elementary and high schools.

== Laws Passed ==
The Commission has shepherded several laws through the legislative process, namely:

Republic Act No.	Name of the Law	Short Title	Date of Passage into Law
12199	AN ACT FURTHER STRENGTHENING THE EARLY CHILDHOOD CARE AND DEVELOPMENT SYSTEM, REPEALING FOR THE PURPOSE REPUBLIC ACT NO. 10410, OTHERWISE KNOWN AS THE “EARLYYEARS ACT (EYA) OF 2013”, AND APPROPRIATING FUNDS THEREFOR	Early Childhood Care and Development System Act	May 8, 2025
12080	AN ACT STRENGTHENING THE PROMOTION AND DELIVERY OF MENTAL HEALTH SERVICES IN BASIC EDUCATION BY DEVELOPING SCHOOL-BASED MENTAL HEALTH PROGRAMS, ESTABLISHING SCHOOLS DIVISION MENTAL HEALTH AND WELL-BEING OFFICES AND CARE CENTERS, PRESCRIBING THE CREATION OF NEW PLANTILLA POSITIONS, AND HIRING AND DEPLOYING SCHOOLS DIVISION COUNSELORS, SCHOOL COUNSELORS, AND SCHOOL COUNSELOR ASSOCIATES IN THE DEPARTMENT OF EDUCATION, AND APPROPRIATING FUNDS THEREFOR	Basic Education Mental Health and Well-Being Promotion Act	December 6, 2024
12063	AN ACT INSTITUTIONALIZING THE ENTERPRISE-BASED EDUCATION AND TRAINING FRAMEWORK AND APPROPRIATING FUNDS THEREFOR	Enterprise-Based Education and Training (EBET) Framework Act	November 7, 2024
12028	AN ACT ESTABLISHING AN ACADEMIC RECOVERY AND ACCESSIBLE LEARNING (ARAL) PROGRAM AND APPROPRIATING FUNDS THEREFOR	Academic Recovery and Accessible Learning (ARAL) Program Act	October 16, 2024
12027	AN ACT DISCONTINUING THE USE OF THE MOTHER TONGUE AS MEDIUM OF INSTRUCTION FROM KINDERGARTEN TO GRADE 3, PROVIDING FOR ITS OPTIONAL IMPLEMENTATION IN MONOLINGUAL CLASSES, AND AMENDING FOR THE PURPOSE SECTIONS 4 AND 5 OF REPUBLIC ACT NO. 10533, OTHERWISE KNOWN AS THE "ENHANCED BASIC EDUCATION ACT OF 2013"		October 10, 2024
11984	AN ACT MANDATING PUBLIC AND PRIVATE EDUCATIONAL INSTITUTIONS TO ALLOW DISADVANTAGED STUDENTS WITH UNPAID TUITION AND OTHER SCHOOL FEES TO TAKE THE PERIODIC AND FINAL EXAMINATIONS AND FOR OTHER PURPOSES	No Permit, No Exam Prohibition Act	March 11, 2024

== Policy Advocacy ==
Aside from legislation, the Commission has also successfully advocated for policy changes and implementation in the executive branch:

Priority Area	Description
Early Childhood Care and Development (ECCD)	Recommendation of the NEDA Social Development Committee to include nutrition in the early years in the Legislative Executive Development Advisory Council (LEDAC) Agenda.
Early Childhood Care and Development (ECCD)	Inclusion of the First 1,000 Days and nutrition-related funding in the early years under DBM’s Program Convergence Budgeting for FY 2026.
Early Childhood Care and Development (ECCD)	Increase in cost per capita of DSWD’s Supplementary Feeding Program in the 2025 National Expenditure Plan from Php 15 per hot meal to Php 27 per hot meal.
Early Childhood Care and Development (ECCD)	Quadruple increase of DOH’s nutrition budget in the 2025 GAA from Php 235 million to Php 977 million.
Early Childhood Care and Development (ECCD)	TESDA Board approval for the prioritization of Child Development Workers Training Regulations (TR) development to create an NC III in ECCD on November 13, 2024.
Early Childhood Care and Development (ECCD)	Conducted a meeting with DILG to include ECCD indicators as part of the Seal of Good Local Governance (SGLG)
Basic Education	Issuance of DepEd Memorandum No. 049 s.2024 that mandates Early Procurement Activities to expedite processes and budget utilization for DepEd projects, including the procurement of textbooks, modules, activity sheets, and teacher’s manuals
Basic Education	Commissioned a study on procurement in basic education to facilitate further reforms in textbook provision.
Basic Education	Conducted a review of the previous 2019 Functional Literacy, Education and Mass Media Survey (FLEMMS) questionnaire, and submitted proposed revisions to the FLEMMS to include additional profiling questions, and to share inputs on improving the instrument for assessing functional literacy
Basic Education	Conducted teacher consultations on the MATATAG curriculum and submitted the inputs to DepEd
Basic Education	Conducted a Workshop on Legislated Subjects and Activities in Basic Education and Higher Education with DepEd, CHED, TESDA, teacher representatives and submitted inputs to the agencies
Basic Education	Conducted consultations and school visits to Quezon City Science High School, Philippine Science High School - Main Campus, and the University of the Philippines - National Institute for Science and Mathematics Education Development on special curricular programs for science, technology, and mathematics
Higher Education	CHED has fast-tracked the reconstitution of Technical Panels, from only 15 in 2023 to an additional 72 in 2024, leaving only 18 more panels to be reconstituted
Higher Education	GAA 2024 special provision on TES prioritization of the poorest, and the subsequent increase in the share of the 4Ps/Poorest grantees
Higher Education	Conducted harmonization workshops as part of ongoing study on empirical-based clustering of characteristics of HEIs as foundation of the proposed typologies
Higher Education	Provided inputs on internationalization of higher education and participated in the deliberations on Resolution of Both Houses No. 7 and Senate Resolution of Both Houses No. 6
Higher Education	In partnership with USAID UPSKILL, EDCOM participated in an Executive Benchmarking Mission to the US with focus on higher education and governance and finance
Teacher Education	The Teacher Education Council has begun its full operationalization consistent with RA 11713, beginning with the appointment of its Executive Director last September 6, 2024
Teacher Education	Issuance of CHED Memorandum Order 10 s. 2024, which empowers CHED to impose sanctions, such as program termination and institutional closure, based on a TEI’s performance
Teacher Education	Convened a Technical Working Group on DepEd Hiring and Teacher Ancillary and Administrative Tasks
Technical-Vocational Education and Training (TVET)	Conducted hearing with DEPED, CHED, TESDA, DOLE, and PSA on LMI processes in the Philippines (PA 19) with PIDS Presentation
Technical-Vocational Education and Training (TVET)	Funding of Php 10 million for the development of a generative Artificial Intelligence (AI)-powered labor market researcher in the GAA of 2025
Technical-Vocational Education and Training (TVET)	Funding of Php 40 million for the acquisition/development of Artificial Intelligence (AI)-powered TVET course builder for Philippine TVET in the GAA of 2025
Governance and Finance	Conducted consultations and documented national government efforts to establish coordinative mechanisms for the education sector, which led to the identification of key challenges hindering the permanent establishment of a high-level coordinating body recommended by EDCOM I. This became the basis for drafting the Concurrent Resolution on the Creation of a Cabinet Cluster for Education currently approved in principle by the President
Governance and Finance	Conducted a workshop on complementarity with Mr. Harry Patrinos, an expert resource person from the World Bank Headquarters, to develop a common understanding of complementarity in the Philippines and explore various models and possible directions for the education sector covering ECCD, basic education, TVET, and higher education
Governance and Finance	Commissioned E-CAIR to generate insights on excess enrollment that can be decongested from public schools vis a vis absorptive capacity of private education
Governance and Finance	Finalized a research report on strengthening performance and accountability systems in the Philippine education system based on desk review, workshops and consultation activities, through technical support from USAID ILO-PH

== Publications and Outputs ==
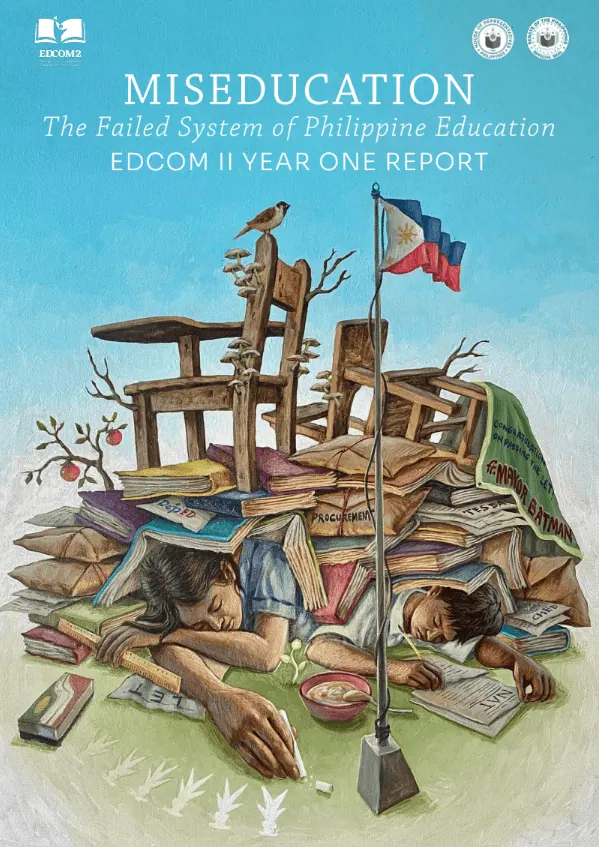
The cover of EDCOM 2's Year One Report

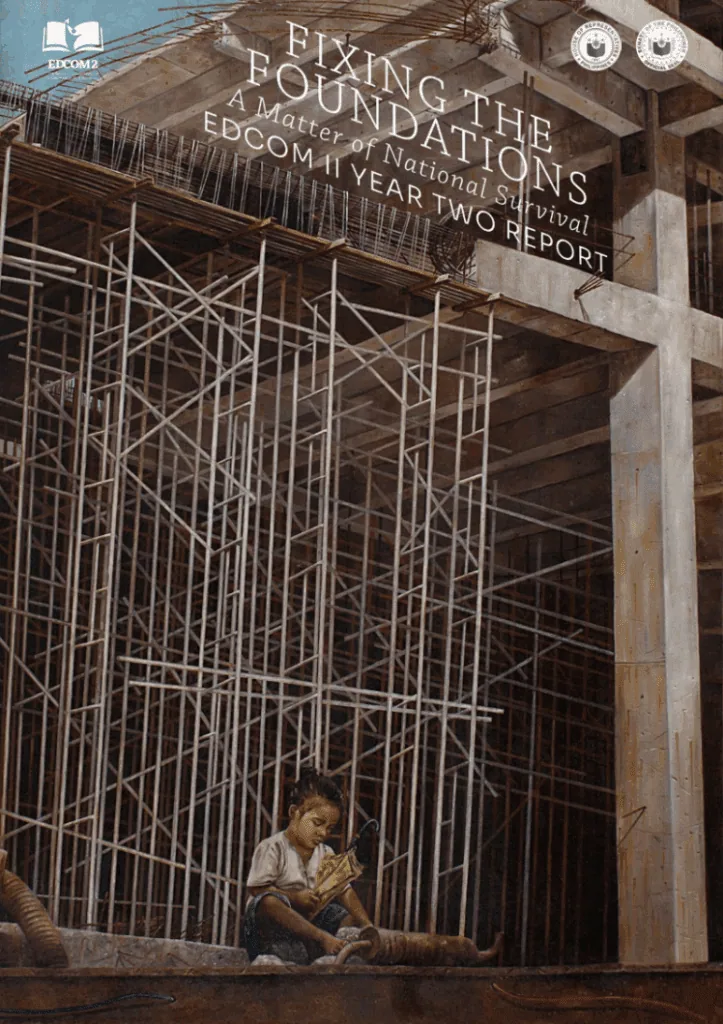
The cover of EDCOM 2's Year Two Report

=== Year One Report ===
On January 23, 2024, the commission published its Year One Report, entitled Miseducation: The Failed System of Philippine Education. The report highlighted the commission's findings in twelve out of its twenty-eight Priority Areas, following its first year of work.

The report also contained 40 recommendations that target specific objectives by the commission.

=== Year Two Report ===
The Commission followed up its first report with its Year Two Report, entitled Fixing the Foundations: A Matter of National Survival, on January 27, 2025. In the report, the Commission advocated for addressing "foundational learning deficits in early childhood and primary education".

Among the findings that EDCOM II highlighted are the shortage of principals in more than half of public schools in the country, that most Grade 3 students were one to two years behind curriculum expectations during the foundational years of learning, government support to only 1.03% of the best and brightest students in the country, the dismal attrition rate in higher education institutions, that 62% of high school teachers teach subjects outside their college major, and that Philippine government spending on education still fails to keep pace with global standards, with basic education receiving the lowest share in the budget, despite its foundational role.

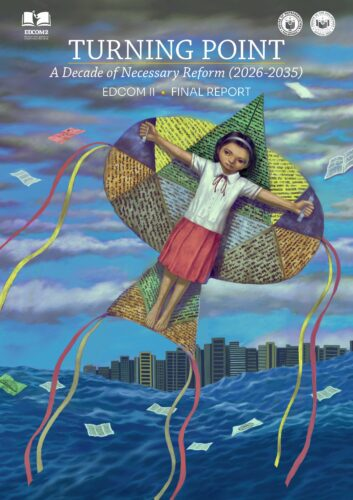
The cover of EDCOM 2's Final Report

=== Final Report (Year Three Report) ===
On January 26, 2026, the commission released its third and final report, entitled Turning Point: A Decade of Necessary Reforms This is in line with RA 11899's mandate to "report to Congress its accomplishments on a periodic basis, its findings and recommendations on actions to be taken by Congress, the departments, and other government agencies concerned with education, and provide a final report at the end of the existence of the Commission."

The report contains the National Education and Workforce Development Plan (NatPlan) 2026–2035, a strategic roadmap designed to reverse the country’s systemic "proficiency collapse" marked by a 91% learning poverty rate and only 0.40% proficiency among Grade 12 students. Anchored on three years of empirical findings, the plan outlines 20 Priority Recommendations across six Key Priority Areas (KPAs)—ranging from early childhood nutrition and functional literacy to integrated governance—aiming to achieve ambitious targets such as 95% reading proficiency for Grade 3 and an education budget reaching 5.5% of GDP by 2035. Central to this "turning point" is the shift from diagnosis to synchronized execution, mandating critical reforms such as ending the culture of "mass promotion" through the full implementation of the ARAL Program, resolving teacher specialization mismatches, and institutionalizing the Education and Workforce Development Group (EWDG) to ensure inter-agency coherence.

=== Other publications ===
- Education Roadmap - Section 7 also mandates that the Commission's Final Report must "include a roadmap with clear key performance indicators and results framework to address the learning crisis". This is set to be included in the Final Report.
- National Education and Workforce Development Plan - During a January 2025 meeting with President Bongbong Marcos, he instructed the commission to proceed with the development of a National Education and Workforce Development Plan (NatPlan), a strategic initiative to align the nation’s education system and workforce with the rapidly evolving demands of a global economy. The initiative is being co-developed with the Private Sector Advisory Council. This is to be included in the commission's Final Report.

== Partners and Stakeholders ==
EDCOM 2 has partnered extensively with academic institutions, civil society organizations, diplomatic missions, and government organizations to fulfill its mandate. Select partners include:

- Ateneo de Manila University
- Australian Aid
- Asian Institute of Management
- BARMM Ministry of Basic, Higher and Technical Education
- British Council
- Commission on Higher Education
- De La Salle-College of Saint Benilde
- De La Salle University-Dasmariñas
- Department of Education
- De La Salle University
- Education Development Center
- IDinsight
- Innovations for Poverty Action
- Jose Rizal University
- Metrobank Foundation
- Philippine Business for Education
- Private Education Assistance Committee
- Philippine Institute for Development Studies
- Research Institute for Teacher Quality
- The Asia Foundation
- Teach for the Philippines
- Technical Education and Skills Development Authority
- UNFPA
- UNICEF
- University of the Philippines Los Baños
- University of the Philippines System
- USAID
- WeSolve Foundation

=== Commissioned Studies ===
The Commission's partnerships have produced several studies devoted to education.

Research Partner	Topic	Title of Study
Philippine Institute for Development Studies	Basic Education	Low Fertility, Ageing Buildings, and School Congestion in the Philippines: Tailwinds, Headwinds, and Some Policy Options
Philippine Institute for Development Studies	Basic Education	Home and School Environment Component: Sense of Belongingness and Bullying for the Second Congressional Commission on Education (EDCOM 2)
Philippine Institute for Development Studies	Early Childhood Care and Development (ECCD)	Behind the Slow Start: An Assessment of Early Childhood Care and Development in the Philippines
Philippine Institute for Development Studies	Early Childhood Care and Development (ECCD)	Beyond Parents and Guardians: Mapping and Mobilizing the ‘Significant Others’ in Early Childhood Care and Development in the Philippines
Philippine Institute for Development Studies	Higher Education	Expansions, Quality, and Affirmative Action in Public Higher Education Institutions
Philippine Institute for Development Studies	Higher Education	An Evaluation of the Tertiary Education Subsidy Program: Context, Input, Process, and Product
Philippine Institute for Development Studies	Higher Education	Strengthening CHED’s Developmental and Regulatory Capacity
Philippine Institute for Development Studies	Higher Education	Hazard and Incidence of Exits of Ever-Enrolled College-Age Students
Philippine Institute for Development Studies	Higher Education	Strengthening Tertiary Enrollment through Financial Aid: Insights from a Survey in Cagayan Valley
Philippine Institute for Development Studies	Higher Education	Economics of Satellite Campuses
Philippine Institute for Development Studies	Higher Education	Cross-Border Student Mobility and Improvements in the Philippine Tertiary Education Program Relevance and Learning Outcomes
Philippine Institute for Development Studies	Higher Education	Review of CHED Policies, Standards, and Guidelines (PSGs) Pre- and Post-K to 12 Reforms
Philippine Institute for Development Studies	Governance and Finance	The Impact of Trifocalization on Philippine Education Outcomes and the Coordination Issue
Philippine Institute for Development Studies	Governance and Finance	Strengthening and Expanding Government Assistance to Students and Teachers in Private Education (GASTPE)
Philippine Institute for Development Studies	Technical-Vocational Education and Training & Lifelong Learning	An Assessment of the Enterprise-Based Training Modality in the Philippines: Barriers, Incentives, and Policy Gaps
Philippine Institute for Development Studies	Technical-Vocational Education and Training & Lifelong Learning	Review of Technical Education and Skills Development Authority (TESDA) Scholarship Programs in Targeting the Poor
Philippine Institute for Development Studies	Technical-Vocational Education and Training & Lifelong Learning	Assessing the Current and Future Middle Skills in the Philippines: Inputs for Policy Agenda
Philippine Institute for Development Studies	Technical-Vocational Education and Training & Lifelong Learning	Measuring the Impacts of Technical Vocational Education and Training (TVET) on Wage Outcomes in the Philippines
Philippine Institute for Development Studies	Technical-Vocational Education and Training & Lifelong Learning	Examining the Effects of Technical Vocational Education and Training (TVET) on Employment Outcomes in the Philippines
Philippine Institute for Development Studies	Teacher Education	Mapping Excellence in Teacher Education: The Role of Centers of Excellence in Teacher Quality
Philippine Institute for Development Studies	Teacher Education	Quality Education Starting with Teacher Education
Philippine Institute for Development Studies	Teacher Education	Revitalizing the Philippine Education System: Facilitating Access and Participation to In-Service Training (INSET) and Teacher Professional Development (TPD)
Philippine Institute for Development Studies	Basic Education	Early Harm, Lasting Impact - The Effect of Parental Violence on Educational Outcomes Among Filipino Children
Philippine Institute for Development Studies	Early Childhood Care and Development (ECCD)	Sustain the Gains: An Assessment of Nurturing Care Outcomes in the Next 1,000 Days
De La Salle University	Teacher Education	Systematic Review of Professional Development Programs for Teachers in the Philippines
De La Salle University	Higher Education	Establishing Targeted Human Resource Development Partnerships between the Philippines’ First Tier Research-Intensive HEIs and Second Tier Research Intensive SUCs
De La Salle University	Basic Education	Development of a Visualization Tool for Understanding PISA Bullying Data in Educational Atmospheres in the Philippines
De La Salle University	Basic Education	Exploring School Environments in the Philippines using the PISA 2018 Dataset
De La Salle University	Basic Education	School Structure, Perceived Climate, Student Characteristics, and Adult Support Predictors of Exposure to Bullying and Sense of Belongingness Based on PISA 2018
De La Salle University	Basic Education	Bullying Experiences of Filipino Students: A Scoping Review
De La Salle University	Basic Education	Developing a Model for Safe and Supportive Learning Environments: A Scoping Review
De La Salle University	Basic Education	Tech-Mediated Learning Resources for Developing Foundational Reading Literacy Skills in K to 3: Literature Review, Infrastructure Situation, Materials (9) Availability Review, and Policy Recommendations For Philippine Schools
De La Salle University	Basic Education	Are K to 12 Students in the Philippines Overworked— by Design?
University of the Philippines President Edgardo J. Angara (UPPEJA) Fellowship	Governance and Finance	Decentralization and Participatory Governance in Education Systems: From Global Experience and Lessons for the Philippines
University of the Philippines President Edgardo J. Angara (UPPEJA) Fellowship	Governance and Finance	Understanding Systems, Creative Strategies, and Enabling Leadership: A Systems Thinking Approach for More Effective Delivery of Educational Services
University of the Philippines President Edgardo J. Angara (UPPEJA) Fellowship	Governance and Finance	Innovations and their Enablers and Barriers in Philippine Basic Education: Policy and Governance Implications
University of the Philippines President Edgardo J. Angara (UPPEJA) Fellowship	Governance and Finance	Kakayanin Natin: Empowering Citizens to Participate in Improving Education Governance in the Philippines
University of the Philippines President Edgardo J. Angara (UPPEJA) Fellowship	Basic Education	Governance Cultures, Perspectives & Practices in Philippine Basic Education Settings: Focus on Teacher-In Service Training and Development
University of the Philippines President Edgardo J. Angara (UPPEJA) Fellowship	Technical-Vocational Education and Training & Lifelong Learning	Aiming for Seamless and Integrated Lifelong Learning Delivery in the Philippines
University of the Philippines President Edgardo J. Angara (UPPEJA) Fellowship	Higher Education	Navigating the Generative Artificial Intelligence Era: Charting the Course for Curricular Reform in Higher Education in the Philippines
University of the Philippines President Edgardo J. Angara (UPPEJA) Fellowship	Technical-Vocational Education and Training & Lifelong Learning	Economic Complexity, Human Capital Development and Industrial Policy in the Philippines
University of the Philippines President Edgardo J. Angara (UPPEJA) Fellowship	Higher Education	Strengthening HAEIs' Programs on Entrepreneurship for Greater Contribution Towards Agriculture and Fisheries Productivity
University of the Philippines President Edgardo J. Angara (UPPEJA) Fellowship	Technical-Vocational Education and Training & Lifelong Learning	Developing Regional Economic Complexity through Product Specialization
University of the Philippines President Edgardo J. Angara (UPPEJA) Fellowship	Higher Education	Leveraging Higher Education to Resolve Healthcare Constraints
University of the Philippines President Edgardo J. Angara (UPPEJA) Fellowship	Technical-Vocational Education and Training & Lifelong Learning	Cultivating Innovation in the Philippines by Addressing Policy Gaps and Creating Pathways for Collaborative Progress between Academe and Industry
University of the Philippines President Edgardo J. Angara (UPPEJA) Fellowship	Basic Education	Using Artificial Intelligence to Support Basic Education Teachers in Under-resourced Contexts
University of the Philippines President Edgardo J. Angara (UPPEJA) Fellowship	Higher Education	Exploring Socialized Tuition as an Alternative to Universal Access to Quality Tertiary Education Act (UAQTEA)
University of the Philippines President Edgardo J. Angara (UPPEJA) Fellowship	Higher Education	From Pixels to Policies: GIS Analysis of Education Access Points and Disparities
University of the Philippines President Edgardo J. Angara (UPPEJA) Fellowship	Technical-Vocational Education and Training & Lifelong Learning	Understanding Labor Market Outcomes of Graduates in the Informal Economy
University of the Philippines President Edgardo J. Angara (UPPEJA) Fellowship	Technical-Vocational Education and Training & Lifelong Learning	Navigating/Negotiating the Lifelong Learning Terrain in the Philippines: Path of Optimism and Caution
University of the Philippines President Edgardo J. Angara (UPPEJA) Fellowship	Technical-Vocational Education and Training & Lifelong Learning	Enabling Young Filipinos to Dream Big and Achieve Bigger: Centering Youth Aspirations in Education Reform
The Asia Foundation	Governance and Finance	Realizing Shared Governance Decentralization of Philippine Basic Education
Philippine Business for Education (PBEd)	Basic Education	Options for Improving DepEd Procurement of Textbooks, TVL Resources and Assessment Services

== Impact ==
The commission's work has been impactful in the Philippines' education reform landscape. The British Council commended the Commission's Year Two Report, "We commend the EDCOM II Year 2 report for its comprehensive analysis and recommendations, which affirm the momentum of our work in higher education and science. The report highlights the increasing collaborations between foreign institutions and the Philippines, aligning with our shared goal of strengthening the country’s higher education and research ecosystem".

The University of the Philippines Los Baños has also expressed appreciation, saying "We, at UPLB, extend our deepest appreciation to the Second Congressional Commission on Education II (EDCOM 2) for its comprehensive assessment and actionable recommendations as outlined in the Year Two Report, Fixing the Foundations: A Matter of National Survival. This report underscores the fundamental role of early childhood education and nutrition interventions in strengthening the foundational stages of learning. Drawing upon the growing body of evidence, the report sets out a roadmap on what needs to be done in terms of capacitating and empowering our teaching and non-teaching personnel, improving access to higher education, increasing industry participation in technical and vocational education and training and lifelong learning, among others, and how to do it."

The Ateneo de Manila University also lent its commendation to the Commission, saying, "Ateneo remains committed to collaborating with policymakers, educators, and stakeholders in implementing these much-needed reforms. We look forward to further engagements with EDCOM 2 in research, policy advocacy, and capacity-building initiatives that align with our shared vision for a stronger Philippine education system"

== Gallery ==
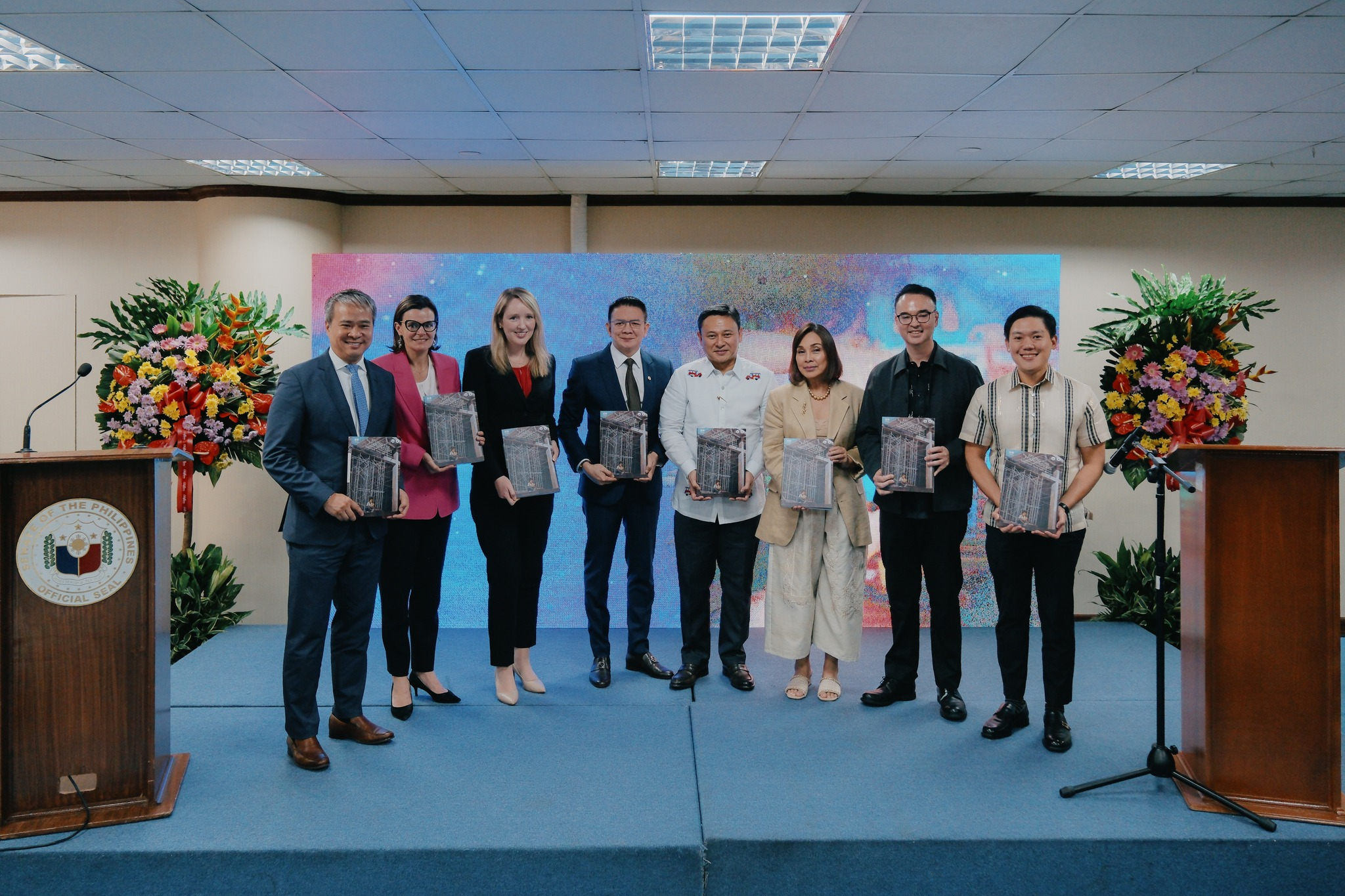

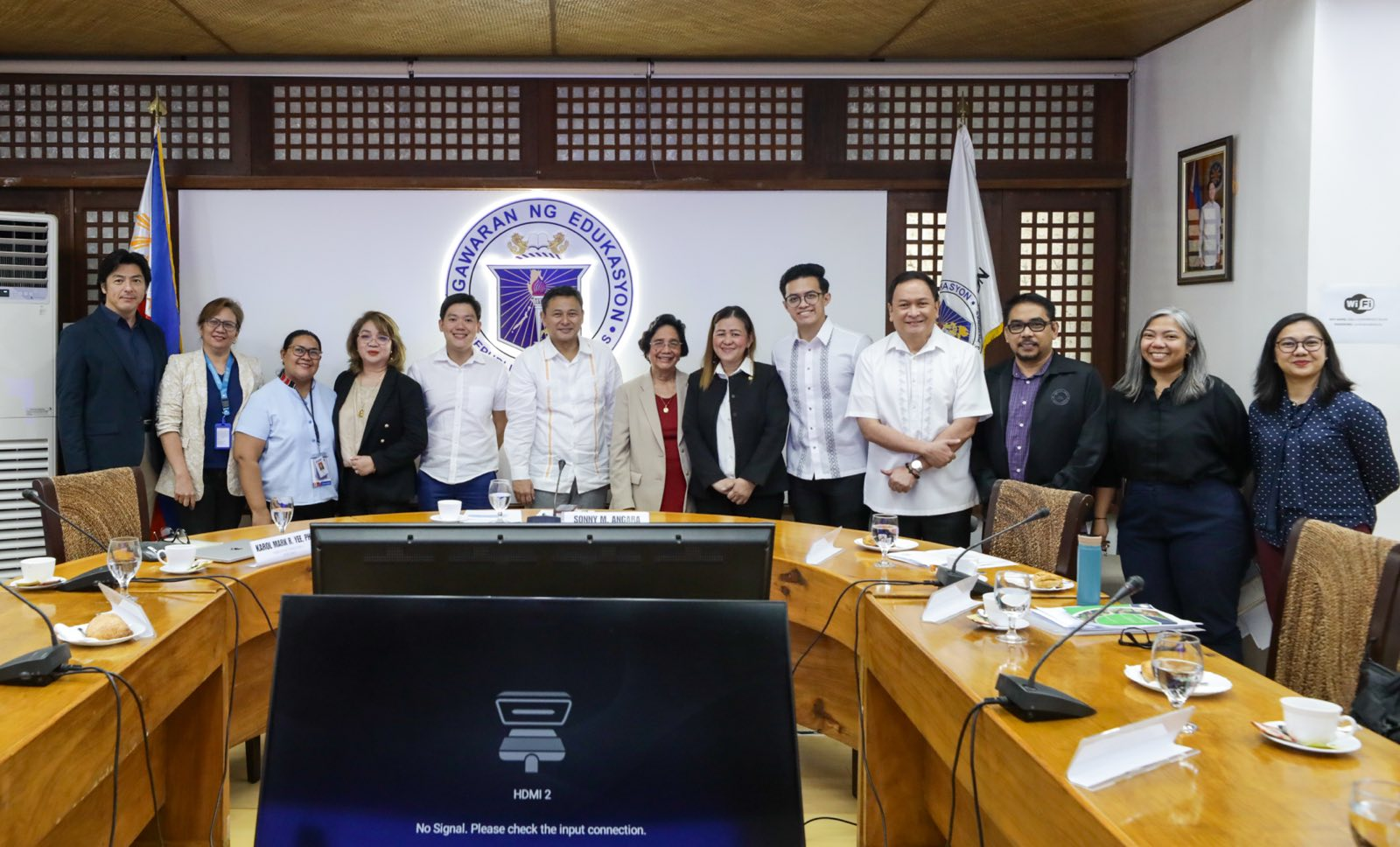

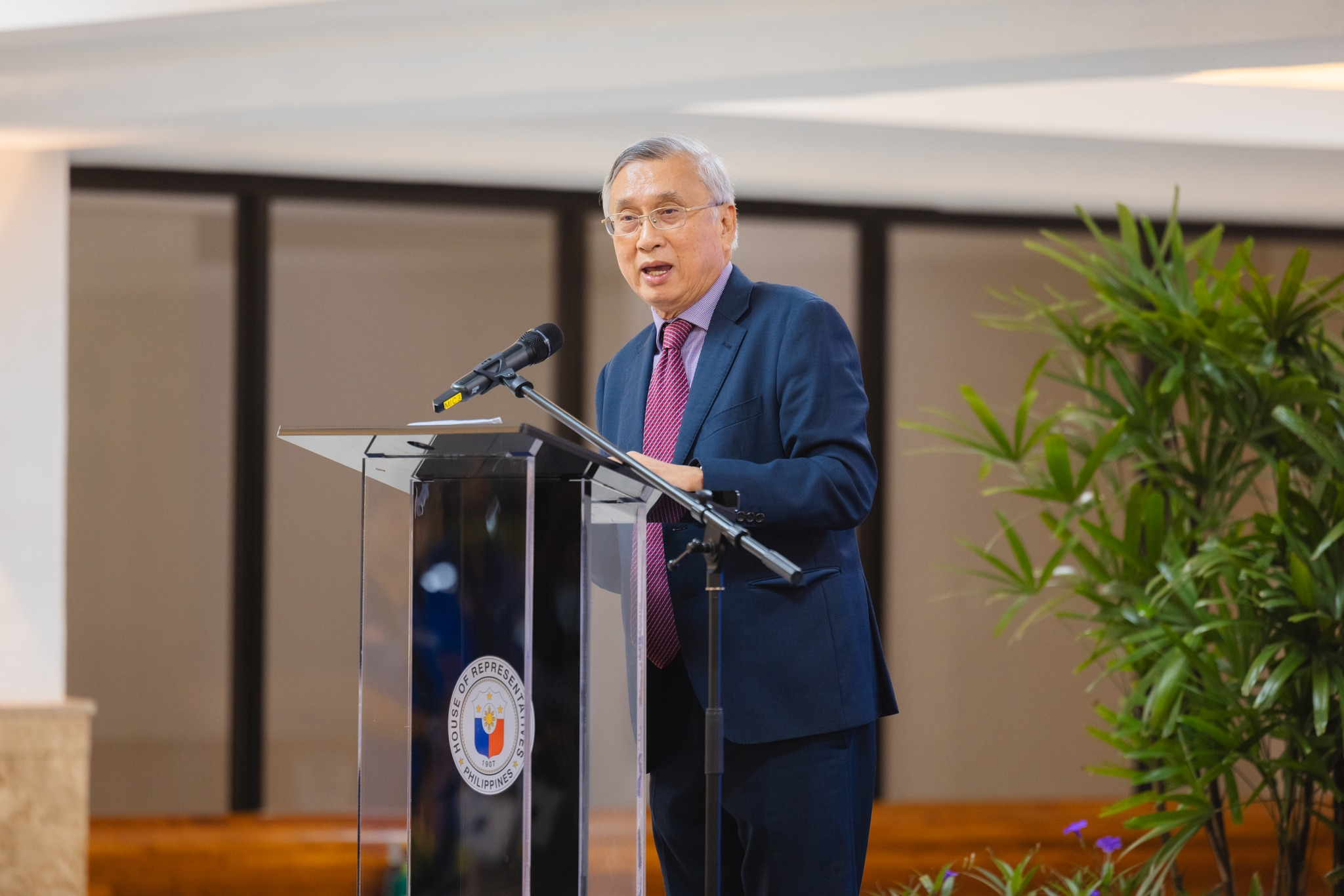

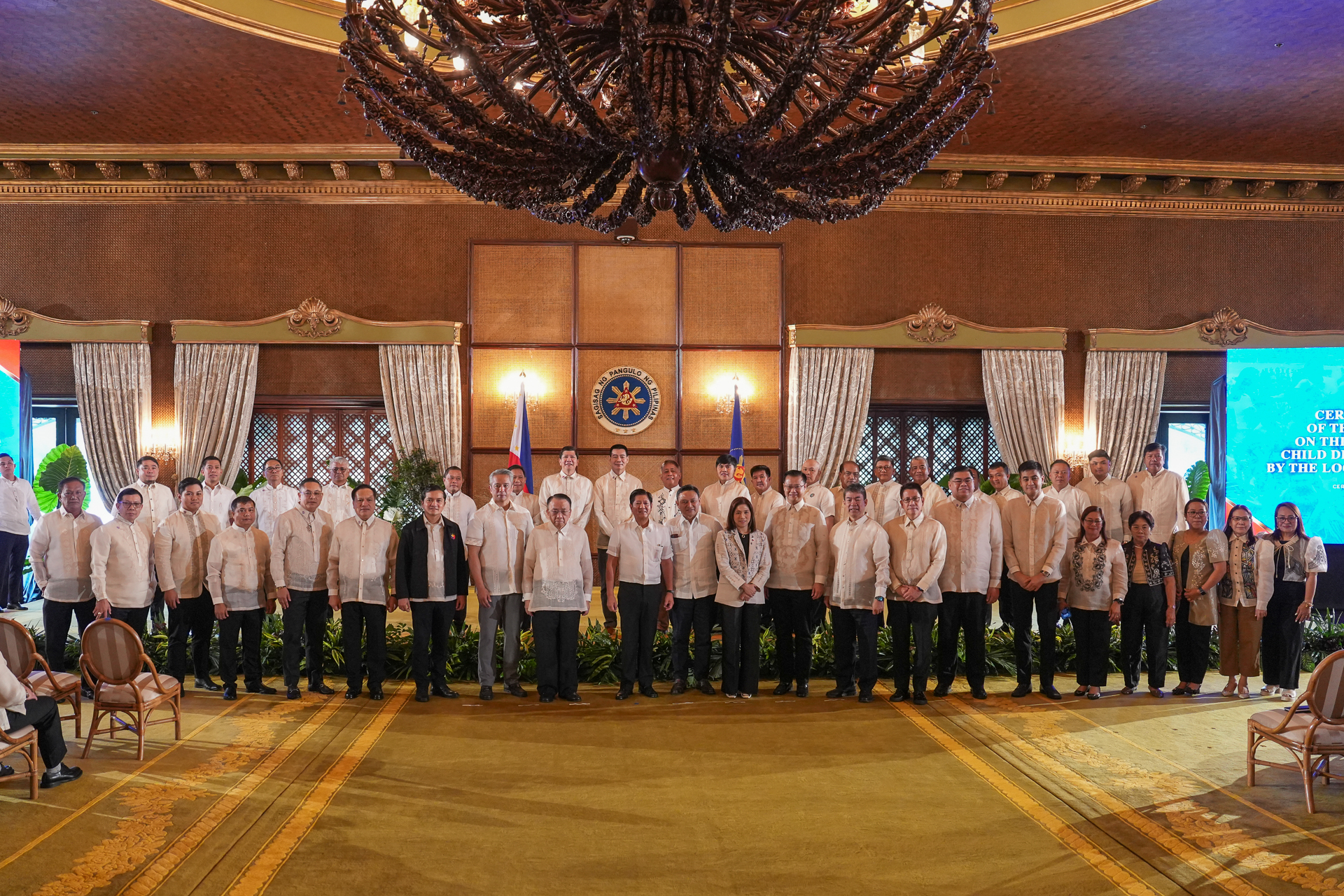

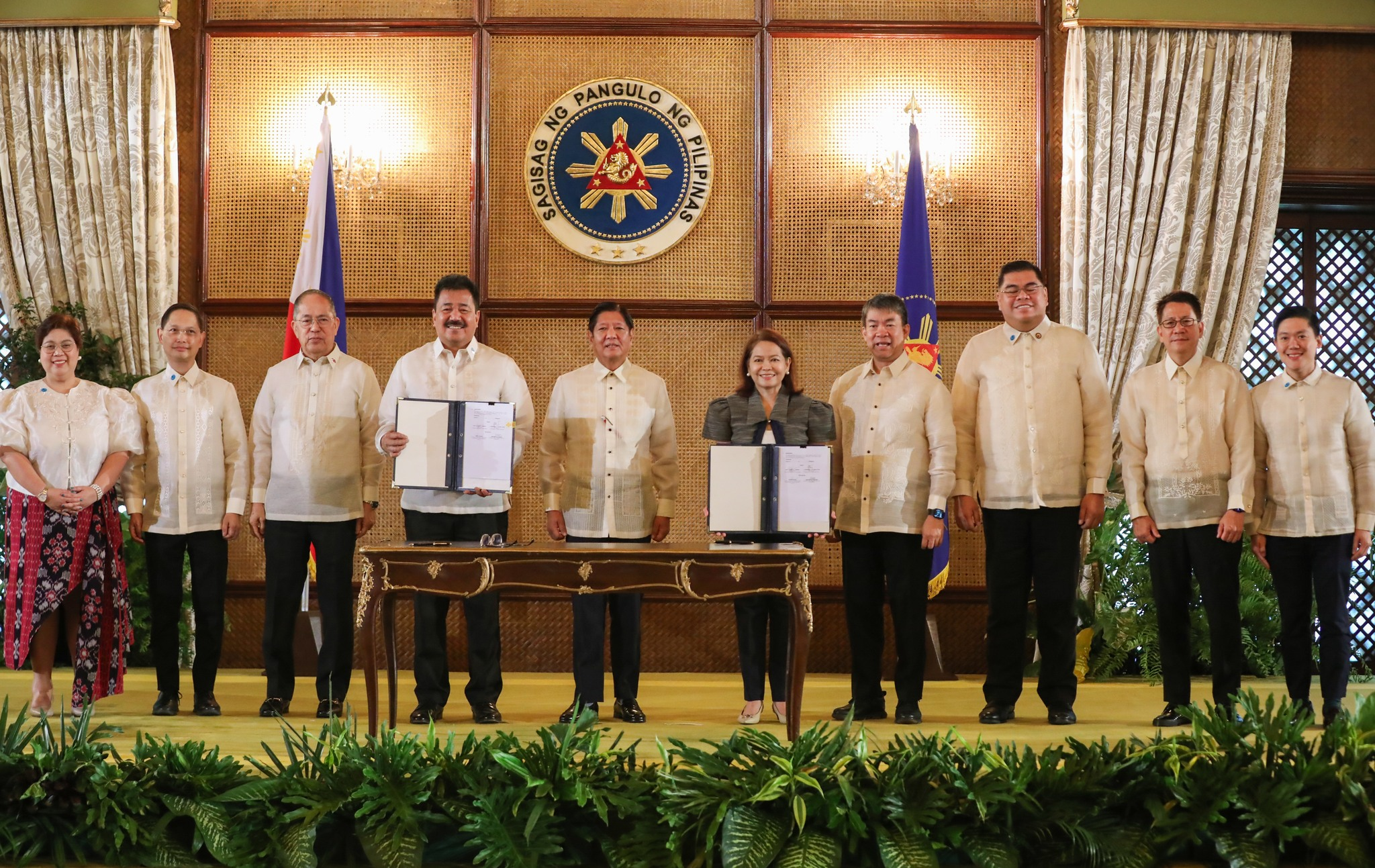

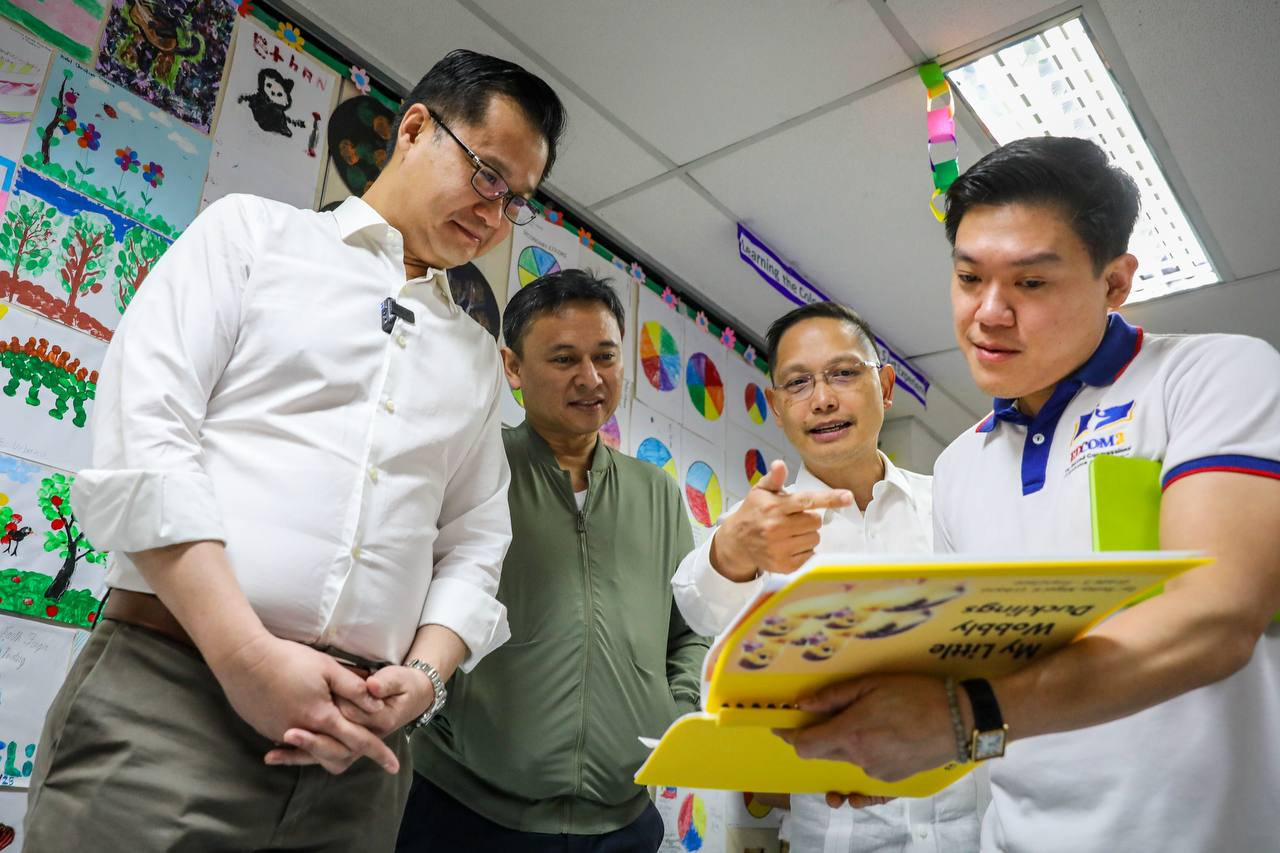

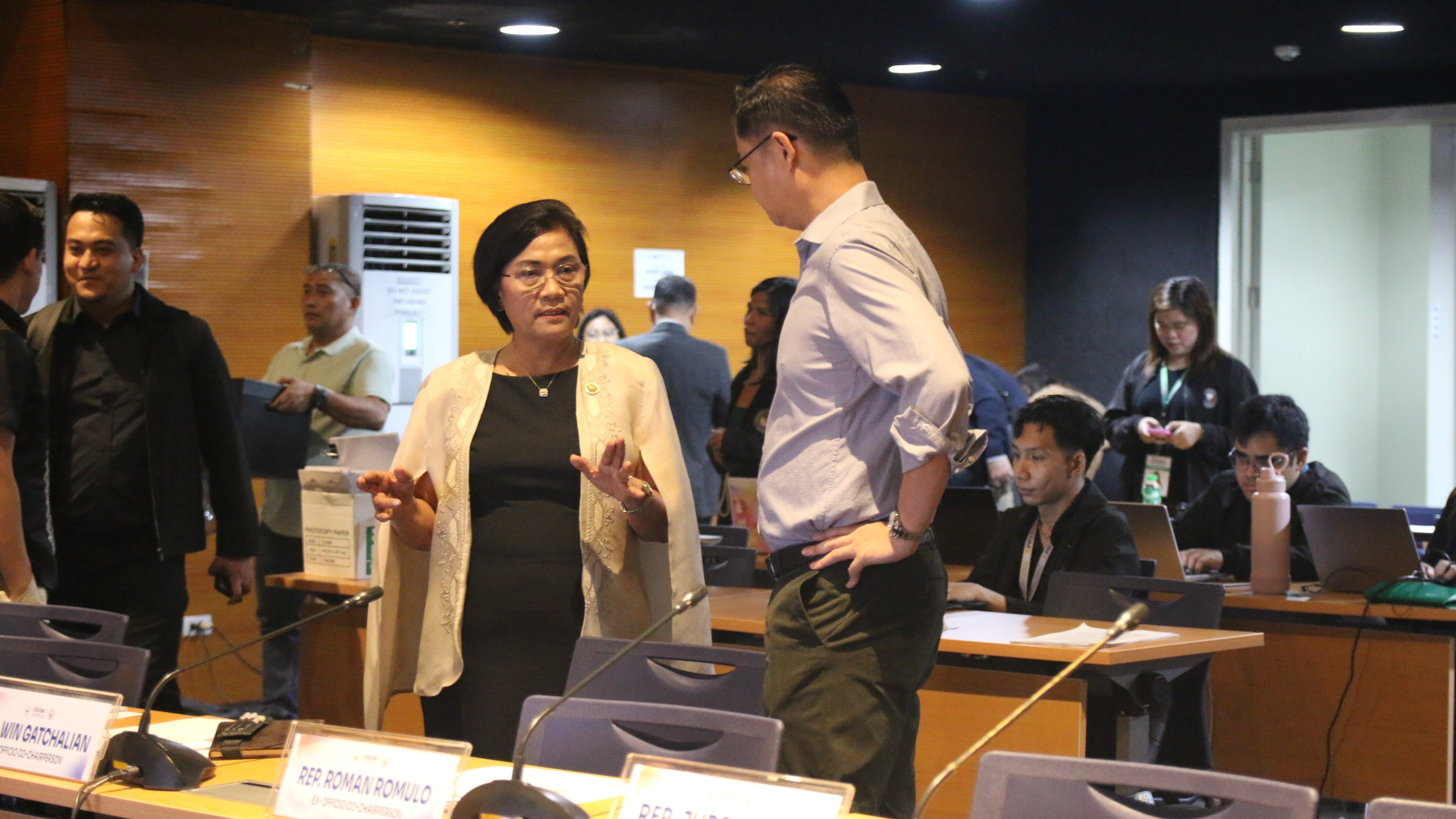

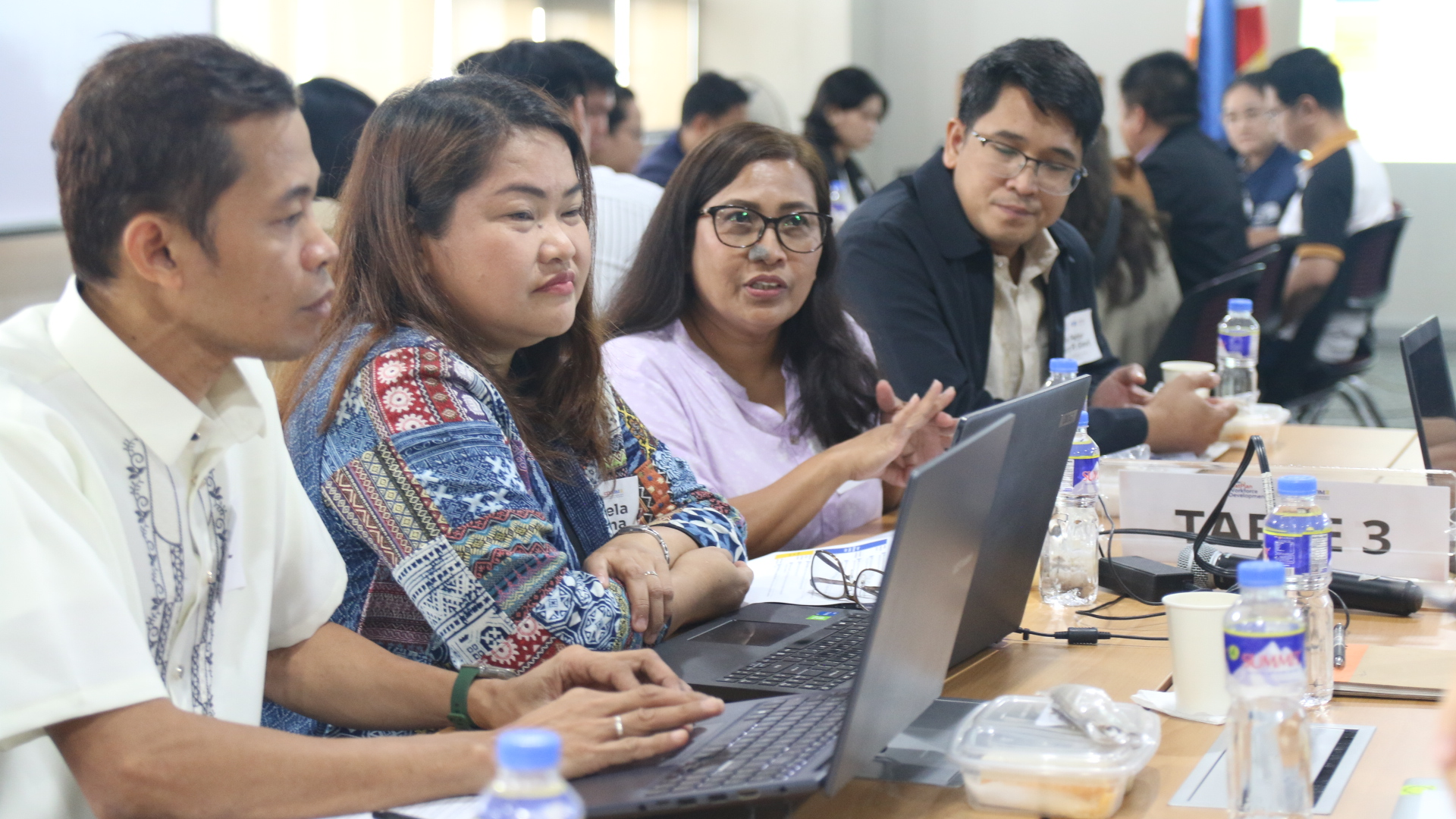

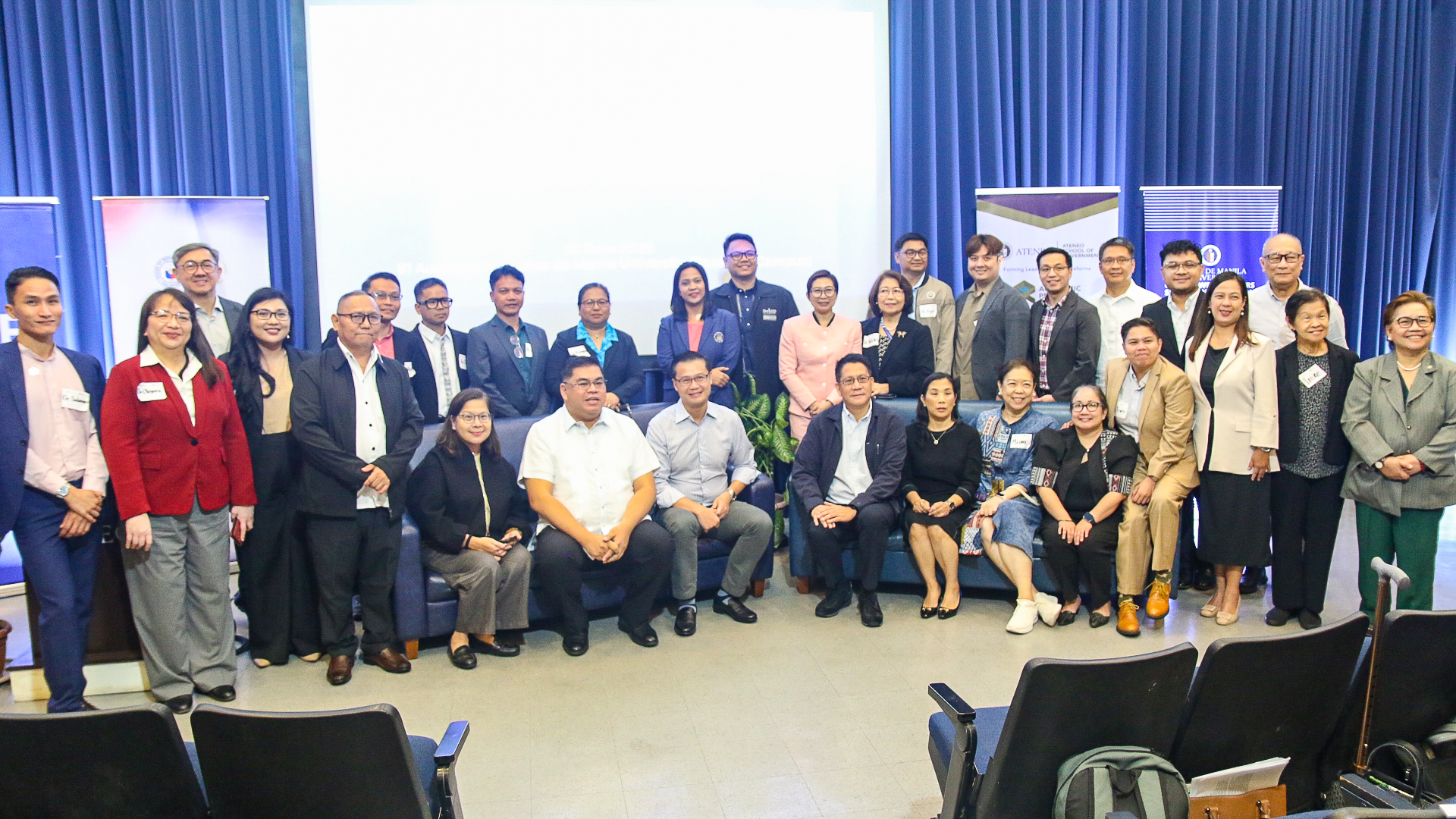

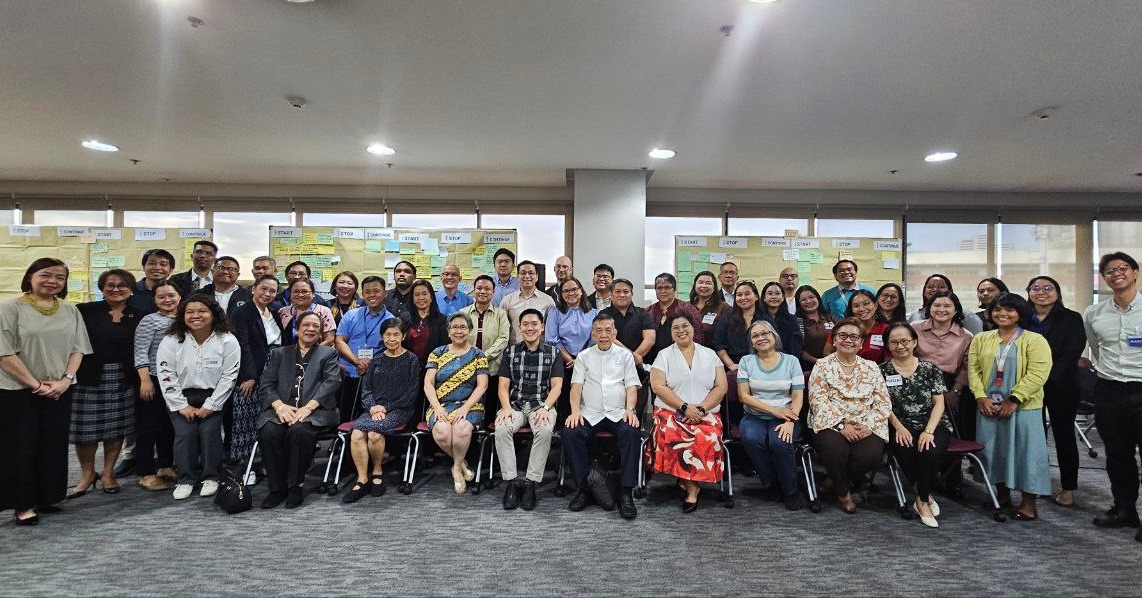

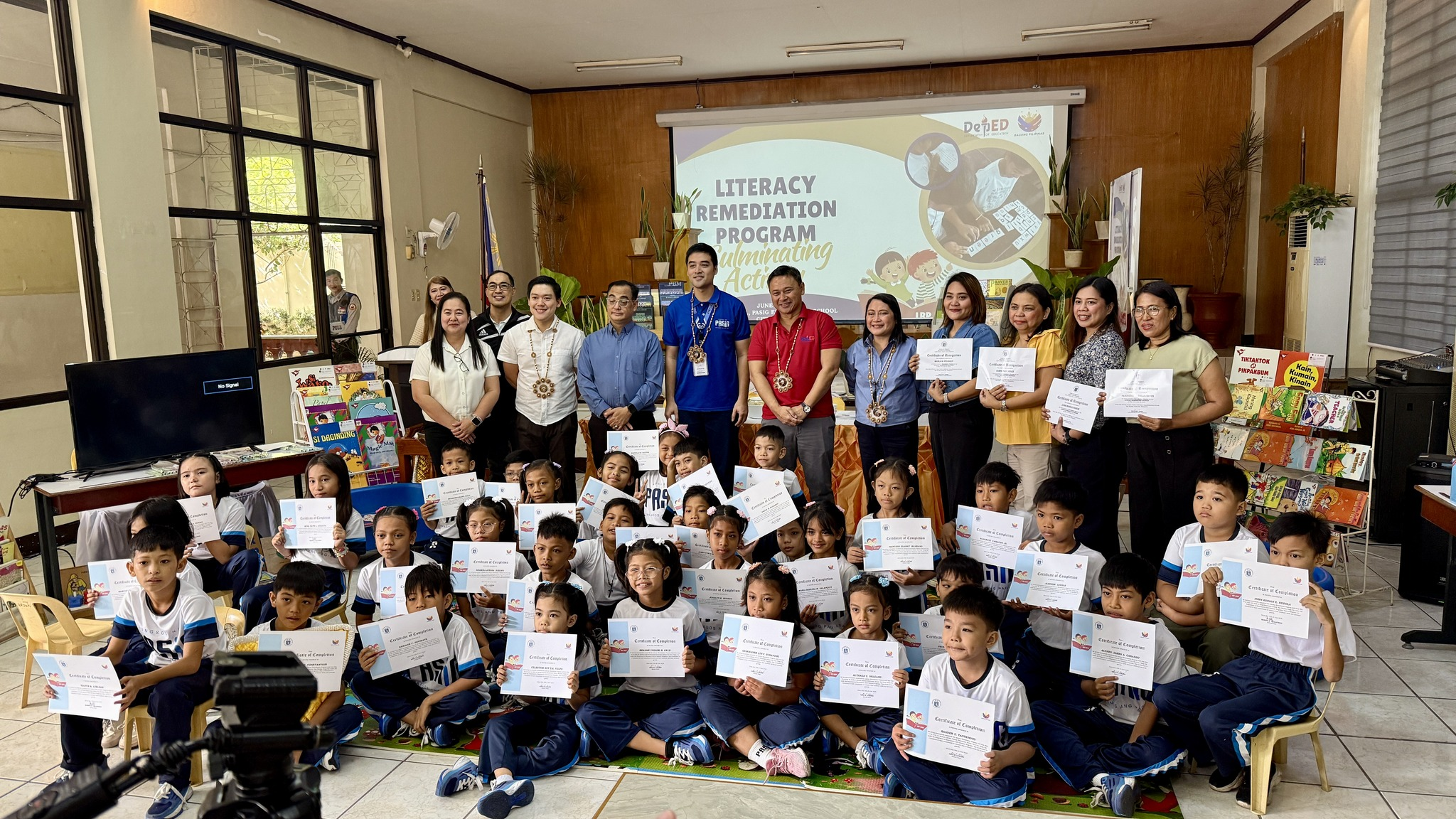

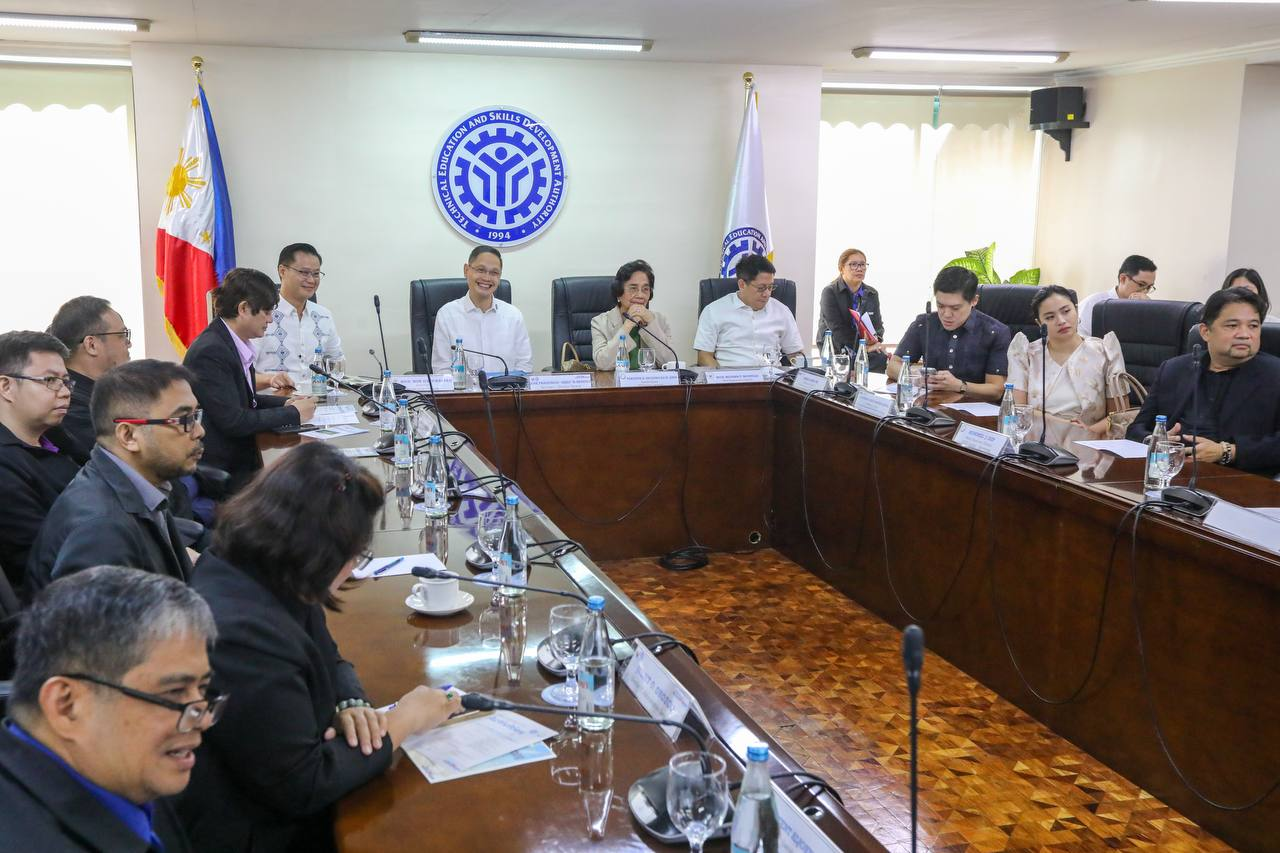

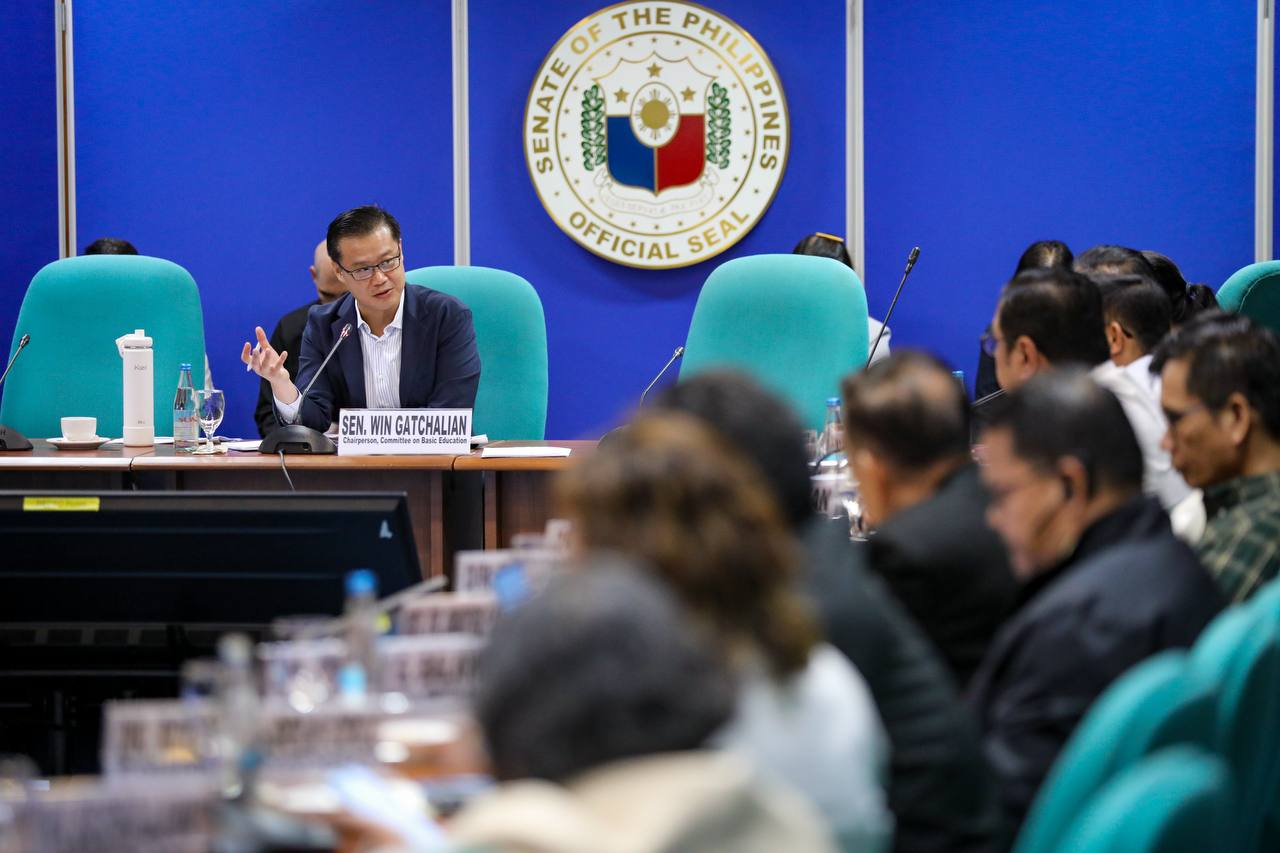

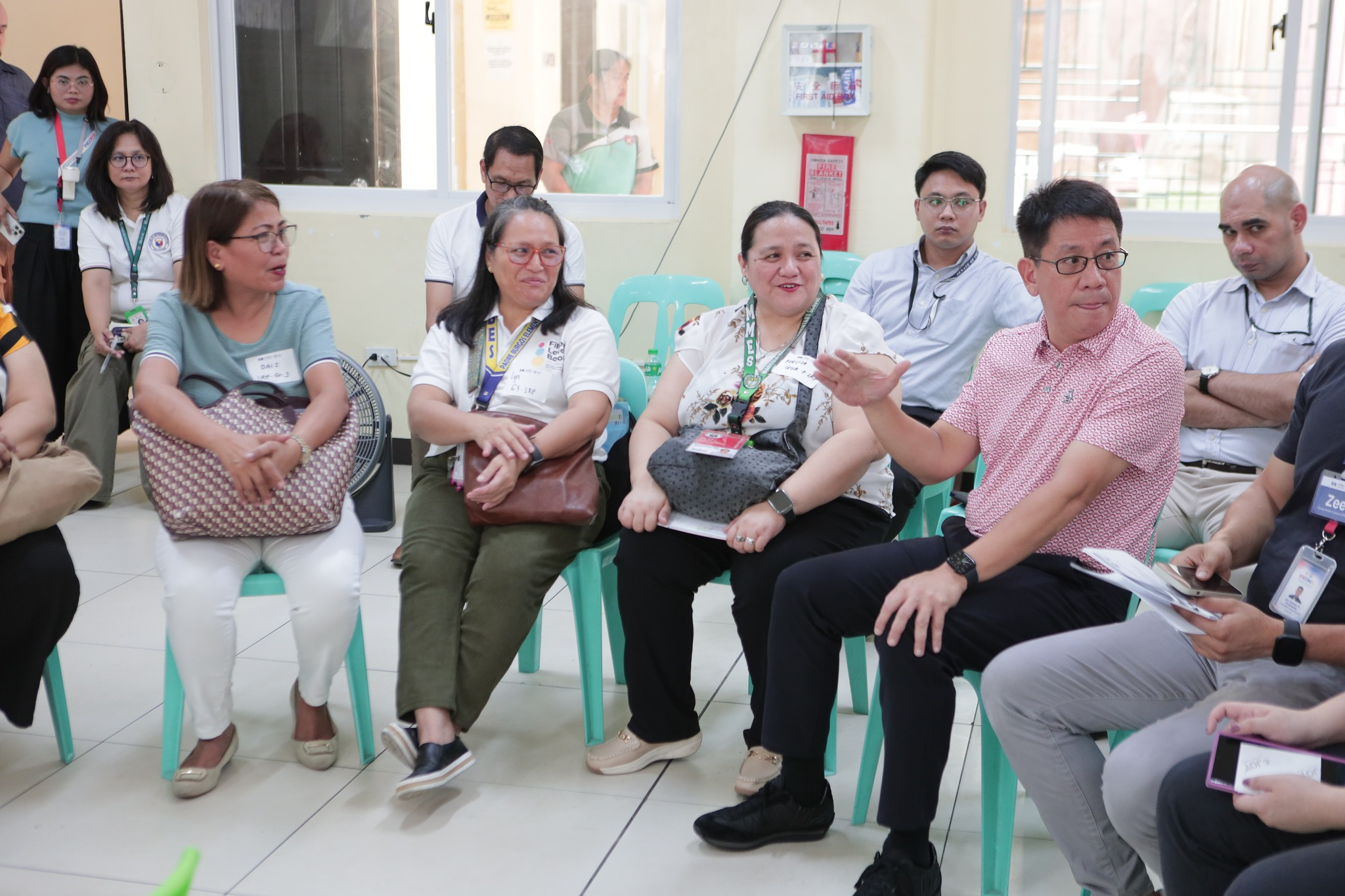

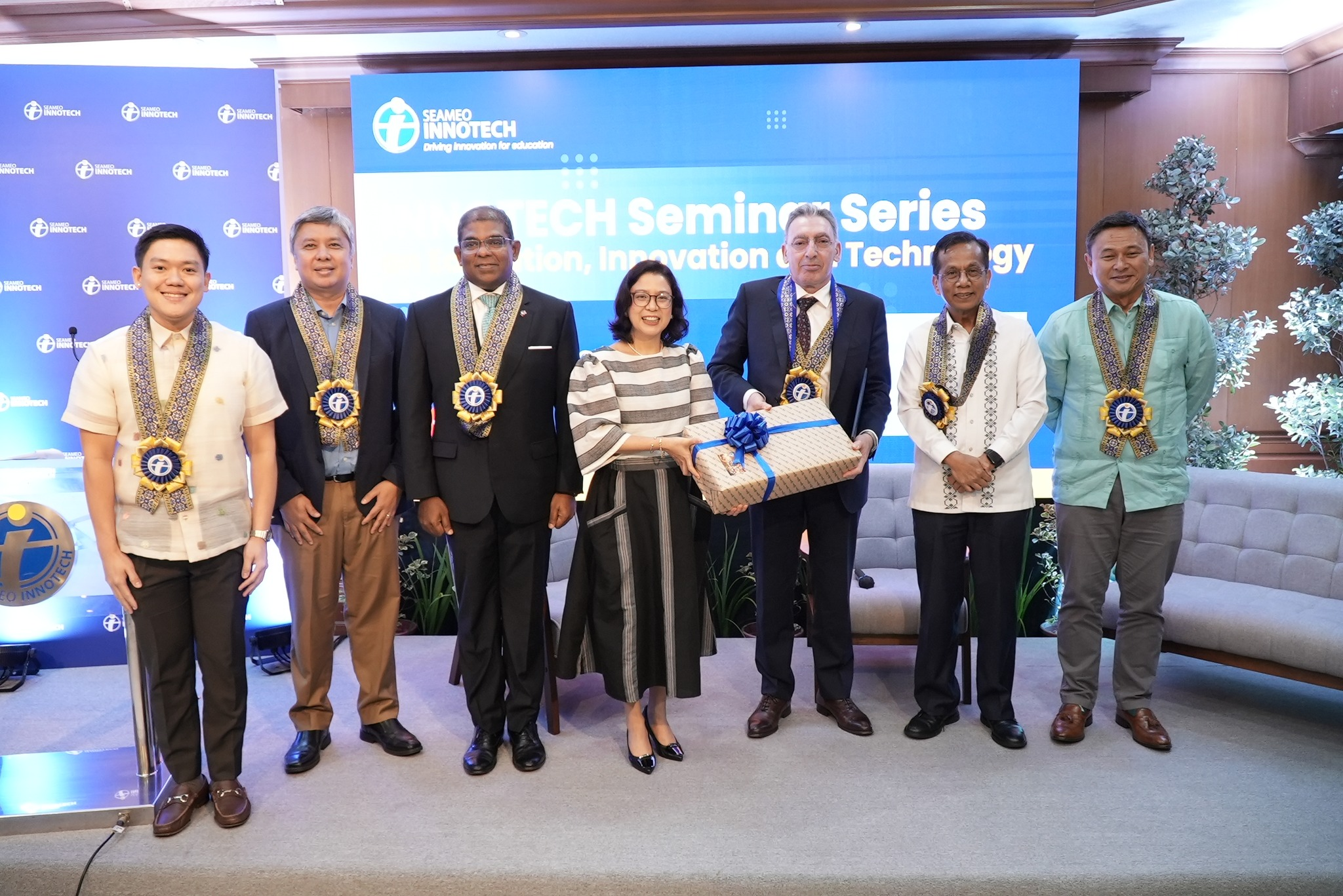

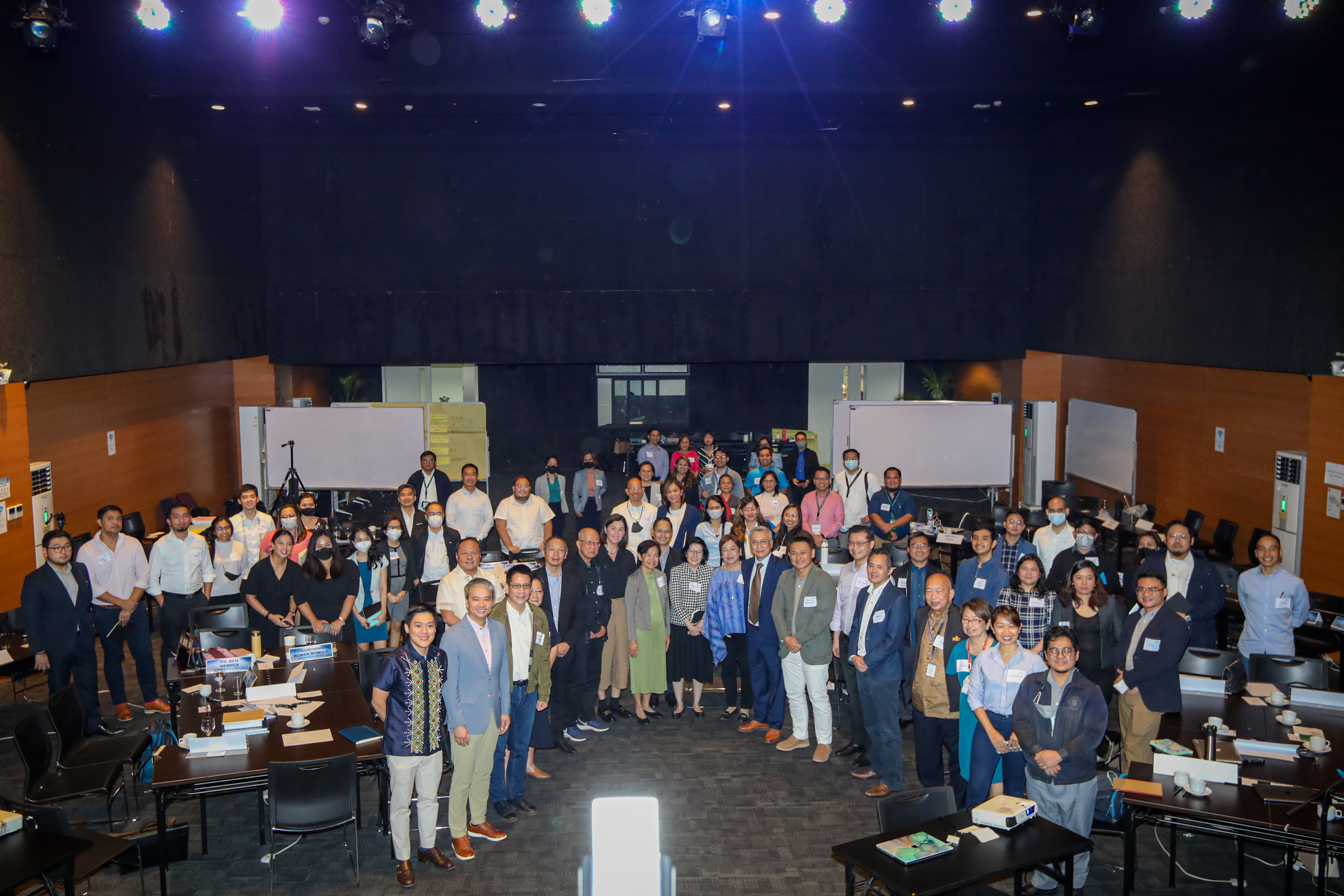
