= Karol Mark Yee =

Filipino education policy researcher and official

Executive Director of the Second Congressional Commission on Education
- Incumbent
- Assumed office 2023

Executive Director IV of the Commission on Higher Education
- In office 14 July 2017 – January 2018
- Appointed by: Rodrigo Duterte
- Preceded by: Julito Vitriolo

Personal details
- Education: University of the Philippines Diliman (BA); Harvard Graduate School of Education (EdM); University of Cambridge (PhD)
- Occupation: Education policy researcher, public official

Karol Mark R. Yee is a Filipino education policy researcher and public official. He has served as executive director of the Second Congressional Commission on Education (EDCOM II) since 2023. He was previously executive director of the Commission on Higher Education (CHED) from 2017 to 2018.

Yee's research focuses on inequality in access to education, higher education stratification, private education, and social mobility in the Philippines. He led the EDCOM II technical secretariat through the commission's 2026 final report, Turning Point: A Decade of Necessary Reform (2026–2035).

== Early life and education ==
Yee completed high school at Xavier School in San Juan in 2004, where he wrote for the student paper and taught in student-run tutorial programs. He has said he failed mathematics in Grade 7 and struggled with the subject through university.

He earned a Bachelor of Arts in Broadcast Communication from the University of the Philippines Diliman, graduating magna cum laude. As a Fulbright scholar, he completed a Master of Education in International Education Policy at the Harvard Graduate School of Education in 2014. His master's research, on teacher education policy in the Philippines, was supervised by Pasi Sahlberg.

Yee received a PhD in Education from the University of Cambridge in 2023 as a scholar of the Jardine Foundation and the Cambridge Trust. His doctoral research examined education and social mobility.

== Career ==
=== Senate of the Philippines ===
Yee began his career as a legislative officer in the Senate under Senator Edgardo Angara, who chaired the Senate Committee on Education. He has credited Angara and Dionisia Rola as early mentors in education policy.

=== Commission on Higher Education ===
At CHED, Yee served as program director of the K to 12 Transition Program, which supported higher education institutions and personnel affected by the shift to the K–12 curriculum. President Rodrigo Duterte appointed him Executive Director IV of CHED effective 14 July 2017, and he took his oath before CHED chairperson Patricia Licuanan on 19 July.

The appointment followed the Ombudsman's dismissal of his predecessor, Julito Vitriolo, over a diploma-mill case. After the Court of Appeals ordered Vitriolo reinstated in August 2017, Licuanan declined to enforce the order, and the post became the subject of a public dispute within the agency. Yee resigned at the end of January 2018, citing what he described as persistent harassment and threats; Malacañang said he could file a police complaint. Days earlier, he had issued the CHED memo announcing Prospero de Vera as officer-in-charge after Licuanan's resignation.

=== YouthWorks PH and academia ===
Yee was chief of party of YouthWorks PH, a five-year youth employment and workforce development project run by Philippine Business for Education with the United States Agency for International Development. He has taught at the Ateneo de Manila University, held a research fellowship at the University of the Philippines Center for Integrative and Development Studies, and is a research affiliate of the Program for Research on Private Higher Education at the State University of New York at Albany.

=== Second Congressional Commission on Education ===
EDCOM II was created by Republic Act No. 11899 to assess the Philippine education sector. As executive director, Yee heads its technical secretariat, which supports the commission's legislator members.

The commission's original legislative mandate ended on 23 January 2026. Its roughly 600-page final report, Turning Point, was launched in the House of Representatives on 26 January and the Senate on 27 January, and turned over to the President on 29 January. The report included a ten-year National Education and Workforce Development Plan (NatPlan) for 2026–2035. Yee said the reforms were framed over a decade because three- or six-year plans keep restarting. In interviews he highlighted the mass promotion of learners who had not met standards, and has argued that early childhood nutrition and relieving teachers of non-teaching work should be priorities.

== Research ==
Yee's research covers inequities in access to and outcomes of Philippine education, stratification in higher education, private education, and social mobility. His 2023 article in the International Journal of Educational Development examined changes in the returns to education across groups in the Philippines.

=== Selected works ===
- Yee, Karol Mark R. (2023). "Raising the floor while lowering the ceiling: Reduced inequities in education returns in the Philippines". International Journal of Educational Development. 101: 102815.
- Yee, Karol Mark (2023). Winner-Takes-All: Access to Education and Labor Market Returns in the Philippines (PhD). University of Cambridge.
- Yee, Karol Mark (2022). "The Changing Landscape of Philippine Higher Education: Going Beyond the Public and Private Debate". Public Policy Monograph Series. University of the Philippines Center for Integrative and Development Studies.
- Yee, Karol Mark R. (2020). "The Philippines' Two Private Sectors". International Higher Education.
