= Malacañang Palace =

Residence and workplace of the president of the Philippines

Malacañan Palace
- Palacio de Malacañán (Spanish); Palasyo ng Malakanyang (Filipino)

- Malacañan Palace as viewed from the Pasig River

- Location within Manila Location within Metro Manila Location within Luzon Location within Philippines
- Former names: Casa Rocha; Governor's Mansion
- Alternative names: Malacañang Palace; Malacañang

General information
- Type: Residence and Office
- Architectural style: Bahay na bato, Neoclassical
- Location: San Miguel, Manila, 4 Jose Laurel Street (formerly Calle conde de Avilés), Philippines
- Coordinates: 14°35′38″N 120°59′40″E
- Current tenants: Bongbong Marcos; President of the Philippines and the first family
- Construction started: 1750; 276 years ago
- Owner: Government of the Philippines

Technical details
- Floor area: 9,931 square metres

Website
- malacanang.gov.ph op-proper.gov.ph www.gov.ph pbbm.com.ph

National Historical Landmarks
- Official name: Malacanang Palace in the District of San Miguel in Manila
- Type: Building
- Designated: May 6, 1998; 28 years ago
- Legal basis: Resolution No. 2, s. 1998
- Region: National Capital Region
- Marker date: 1941; 85 years ago

Malacañang Palace (Filipino: Palasyo ng Malakanyang, locally [paˈlɐ̞ʃo näŋ maläkɐˈɲäŋ]), officially known as Malacañan Palace, is the official residence and principal workplace of the president of the Philippines. It is located in the Manila district of San Miguel, along Jose Laurel Street, though it is commonly associated with nearby Mendiola Street. The term Malacañang is often used as a metonym for the Government of the Philippines. The sprawling Malacañang Palace complex includes numerous mansions and office buildings designed and built largely in the bahay na bato and neoclassical styles. Among the presidents of the present Fifth Republic, only Gloria Macapagal Arroyo actually lived in the main palace as both her office and her residence, with all others residing in nearby properties that form part of the larger palace complex. The palace has been seized several times as a result of protests starting with the People Power Revolution of 1986, the 1989 coup attempt (when the palace was buzzed by T-28 Trojans), the 2001 Manila riots, and the EDSA III riots.

The original structure was built in 1750 by Don Luis José de la Rocha Camiña, a Spaniard physician in the galleon trade, who built it as a summer house with his wife, Gregoria Tuason de Zaballa, daughter of don Antonio Tuason and doña Justa de Zaballa. It is located in San Miguel, along the Pasig River. The Rocha property was built of stone and described as being a relatively modest country house (although modern-day Rochas say it was not small and in fact had a ballroom) with a bath house on the river and gardens, all enclosed by a stone fence. The latter was probably a nipa-roofed and bamboo-enclosed structure built on the water, away from the gaze of passing boats. It was easily accessible from Intramuros and Binondo by boat, carriage, or horseback. Malacañan was purchased by the state in 1825 as the summer residence for the Spanish governor-general upon Colonel José Miguel Formento's death.

Following an earthquake on June 3, 1863, which destroyed the governor-general's official residence, the Palacio del Gobernador in the walled city of Intramuros, Malacañan became the official seat of power of Spanish colonial rule. The use of the palace as the official state residence of colonial rulers continued after sovereignty over the islands was ceded to the United States in 1898. General Wesley Merritt was the first American governor to make use of the estate as his residence.

Since 1863, the palace has been occupied by eighteen Spanish governors-general, fourteen American military and civil governors, and later the presidents of the Philippines. The palace had been enlarged and refurbished several times since 1750; the grounds were expanded to include neighboring estates, and many buildings were demolished and constructed during the Spanish and American periods. Its posts were strengthened, roof tiles replaced with corrugated iron sheets, balconies repaired, and both the exterior and interior were beautified. More recently, between 1978 and 1979, the palace building was drastically remodeled and extensively rebuilt by First Lady Imelda Marcos during the tenure of Ferdinand Marcos. Malacañang was the only major government building in Manila to survive heavy artillery bombing during the Second World War. The palace continues to be the centerpiece of the upscale district of San Miguel, spared by the war.

== Name ==
=== Etymology ===
The earliest document to address the building's roots was the Compendio de la Historia de Filipinas written in 1877 by Spanish historian Felipe de Govantes, in which he stated that the term Malacañán meant "place of the fisherman". This was again referenced in the 1895 Historia general de Filipinas by José Montero y Vidal and the Historia de Filipinas by Manuel Artigas y Cuerva in 1916. In 1972, Ileana Maramag in her work on Malacañan history supplied the Tagalog word: mamalakáya, which means fisherman. The original denomination for the location is believed to be Mamalakáya-han, with the Tagalog suffix -han meaning "place of", later simplified by the Spanish colonial authorities as Malacañán and adapted according to Spanish orthography.

=== Spelling ===
During the Spanish colonial era, Spanish-language books that were published at the time spelled the word as Malacañang. The name was changed to "Malacañan" during the American occupation of the Philippines from 1898 until 1946, supposedly for ease of pronunciation despite the fact that "-ng" as a final sound is very familiar in the English language. However, after the inauguration of President Ramon Magsaysay on December 30, 1953, the Philippine government reverted the name to Malacañang in honor of the palace's historical roots. During the administration of Corazon Aquino, for historical reasons, government policy was introduced to distinguish between both terms; while "Malacañan Palace" refers to the official residence of the president, "Malacañang" is addressed as the office of the president. Currently, the heading Malacañan Palace is reserved for official documents personally signed by the president, while those delegated to and signed by subordinates use the heading Malacañang.

== History ==
=== Spanish colonial era ===
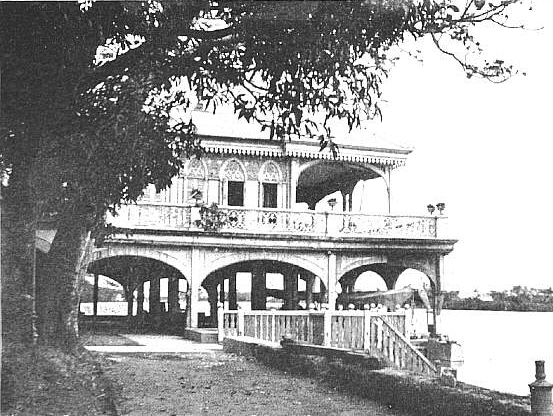
Malacañang Palace in 1898.

The Spanish captains-general (before the independence of New Spain, from which the Philippines was directly governed) and the later governors-general originally resided at the Palacio del Gobernador (Governor's Palace) fronting the city square in the walled city of Intramuros in Manila. Malacañang Palace was originally built as a casita (or country house) in 1750, made of adobe and wood, with interiors panelled with the finest narra and molave. It sits on 16-hectare land owned by Spanish aristocrat don Antonio V. Rocha. It was subsequently sold to Col. José Miguel Formento on November 16, 1802, for a sum of a thousand pesos. Later, it was sold to the government upon his death in January 1825. With its expansive gardens and lazy verandah overlooking the placid Pasig River, Malacañan became the temporary summer home of governors-general, escaping the hectic bustle and unbearable heat of Intramuros.

An earthquake on June 3, 1863, destroyed the Palacio del Gobernador, and thereafter, Malacañang became the governor-general's official residence. Rafaél de Echagüe y Bermingham, previously governor of Puerto Rico, became the first Spanish governor-general to reside in the palace. Finding the place too small, he expanded the estate with a wooden two-story addition to the back of the original structure. He also added stables, carriage sheds, a boat landing for river-borne visitors, and smaller buildings for aides, guards, and porters.

An 1869 earthquake necessitated speedy repairs with more extensive reconstruction and expansion, further undertaken between 1875 and 1879 after subsequent earthquakes, typhoons and a fire caused graver structural damage. Posts and supports were repaired or replaced. Balconies were reinforced. Roofing was replaced with galvanized iron to lighten structural load and cornices were added for additional flair. The interior was also refurbished.

In 1880, an earthquake occurred, necessitating more repairs. This time, porticos were added to the façade to shelter waiting carriages. In 1885, a flagpole was installed in front of the palace. Decaying woodwork, stuck shell windows, leaking roofs, loose kitchen tiles, and drooped stables were some of the remaining deterioration due to numerous natural phenomena. An additional 22,000 pesos were spent on renovation and reconstruction.

By the end of Spanish rule in 1898, Malacañang Palace was a rambling complex of mostly wooden buildings that had sliding capiz windows, patios and azoteas.

=== American colonial rule ===
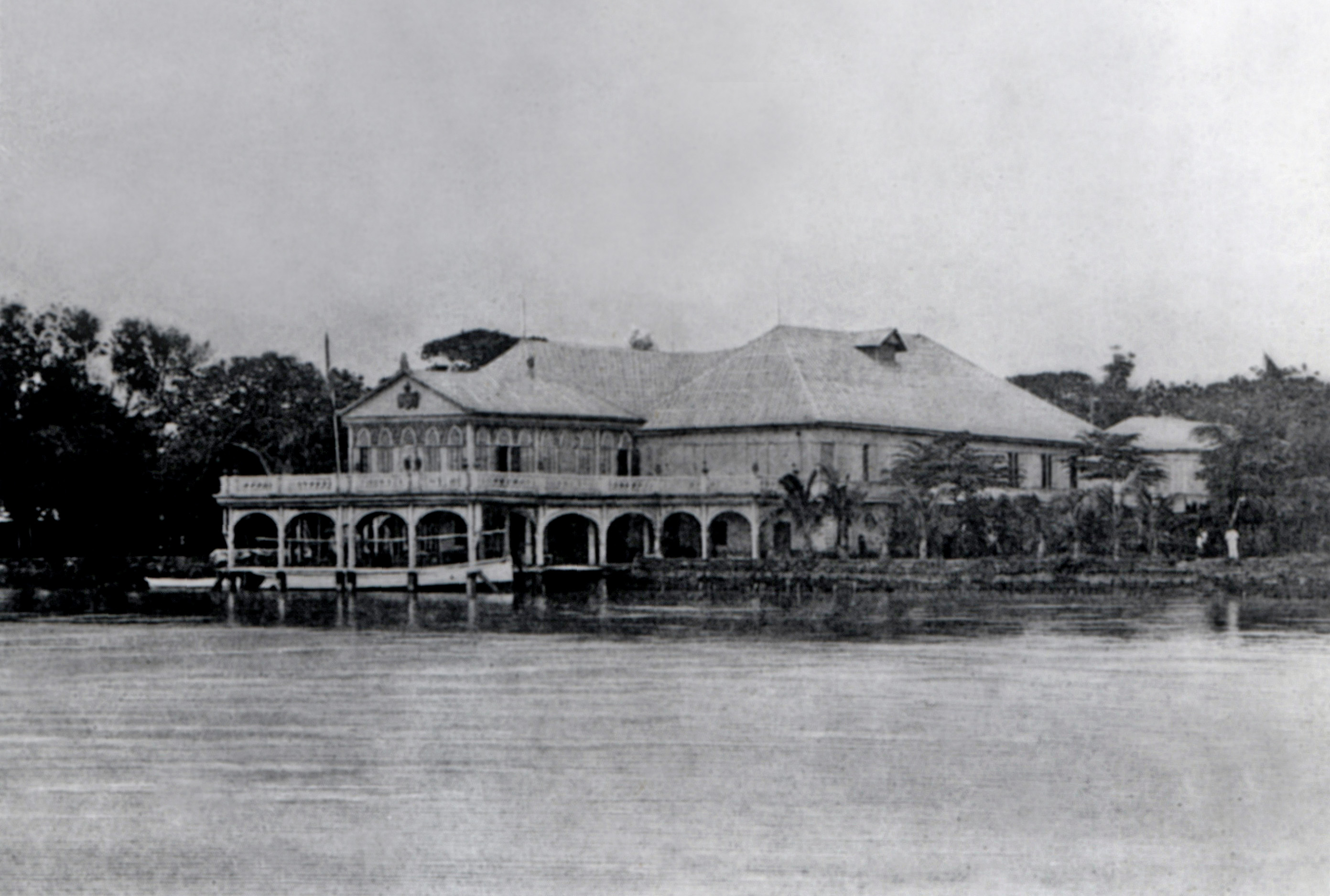
Malacañang Palace Pasig River façade, c. 1910

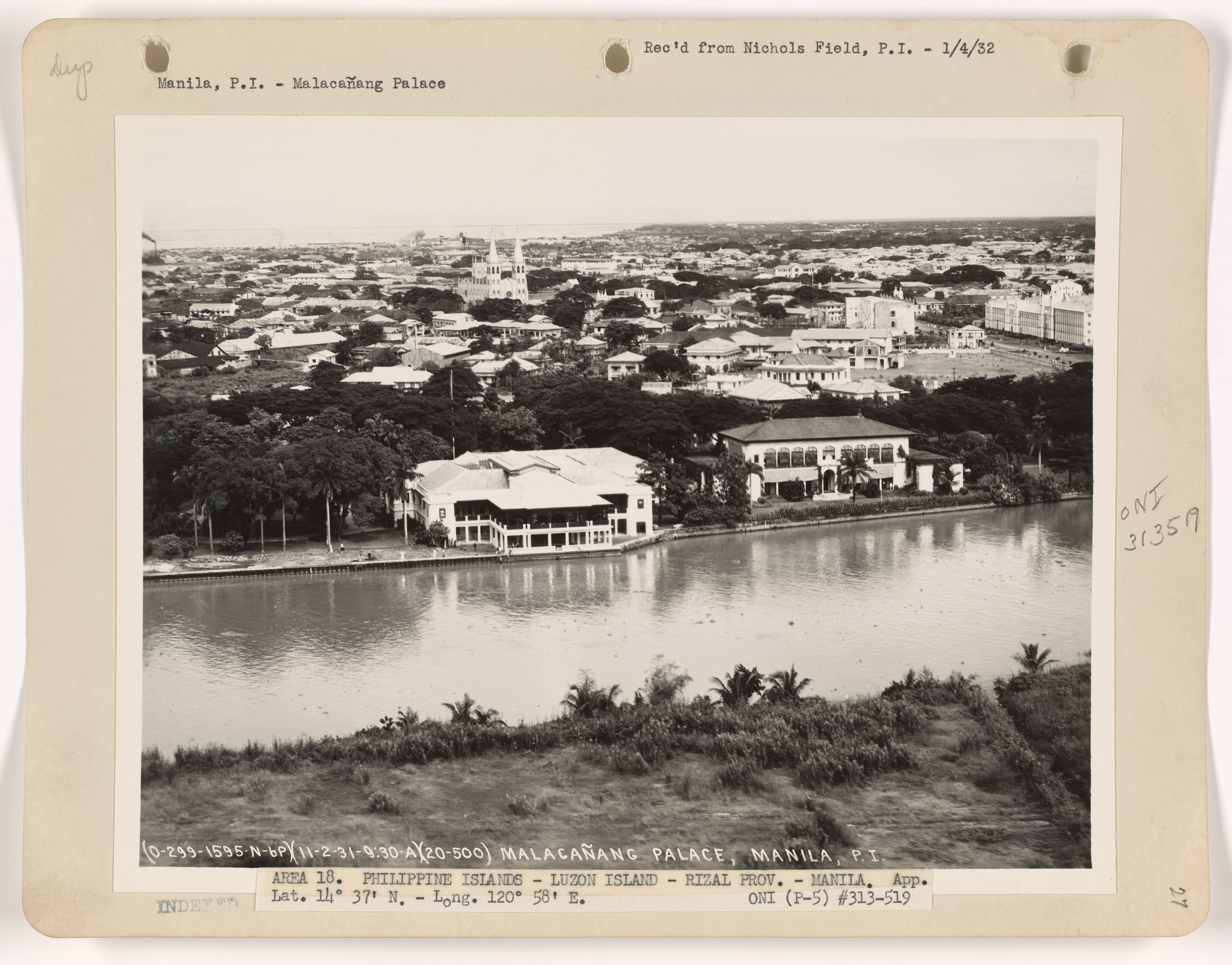
Aerial view of Malacañang Palace, 1932

When the Philippines came under American sovereignty following the Spanish–American War, Malacañang Palace became the residence of the American governors-general, starting with General Wesley Merritt, the first American military governor to reside at the palace in 1898. William Howard Taft became the first civil governor to reside there in 1901. They and subsequent governors-general continued to improve and enlarge the palace, buying more land and reclaiming more of the Pasig River. Left and right wings were added. An azotea facing the river was joined to the existing azotea. A staircase was transferred to the center of the foyer with galleries built around the stairway where the public could circulate during crowded receptions. The ground floor was raised above the flood line, and workers replaced wood with concrete, beautified the interiors with hardwood panelling and added intricate chandeliers.

=== Commonwealth Era ===
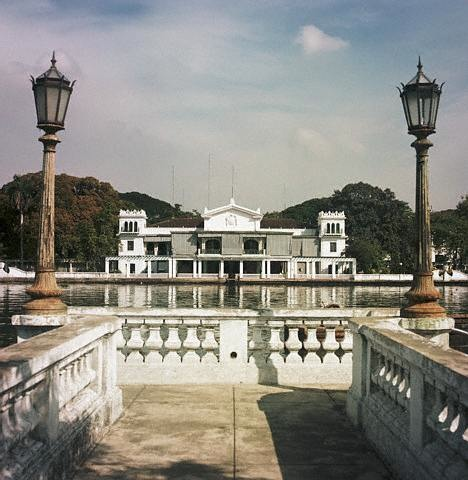
Malacañang in 1940

The complex became the official residence of the president of the Philippines upon the establishment of the Commonwealth of the Philippines on November 15, 1935. President Manuel L. Quezon became the first Filipino resident of the palace. It has been the Philippine president's official residence ever since. One major improvement addressed during the American period was flood control. Quezon tackled the flooding problem around Malacañang by reclaiming 15 feet of the Pasig River bank and building a concrete wall. He also converted the ground floor (bodega) into a social hall. In addition to that, the Americans used shutters similar to Japanese shoji (made of opalescent shell) to soften the intensity of the tropical sunlight.

Emilio Aguinaldo, recognized as the first Filipino president but of the revolutionary government, the First Philippine Republic, established during the Spanish rule, did not reside but was later taken to the palace by the Americans as a political prisoner for a few weeks in 1901 after his capture in Palanan, Isabela. He resided in his private home as president, now the Aguinaldo Shrine, in Kawit, Cavite.

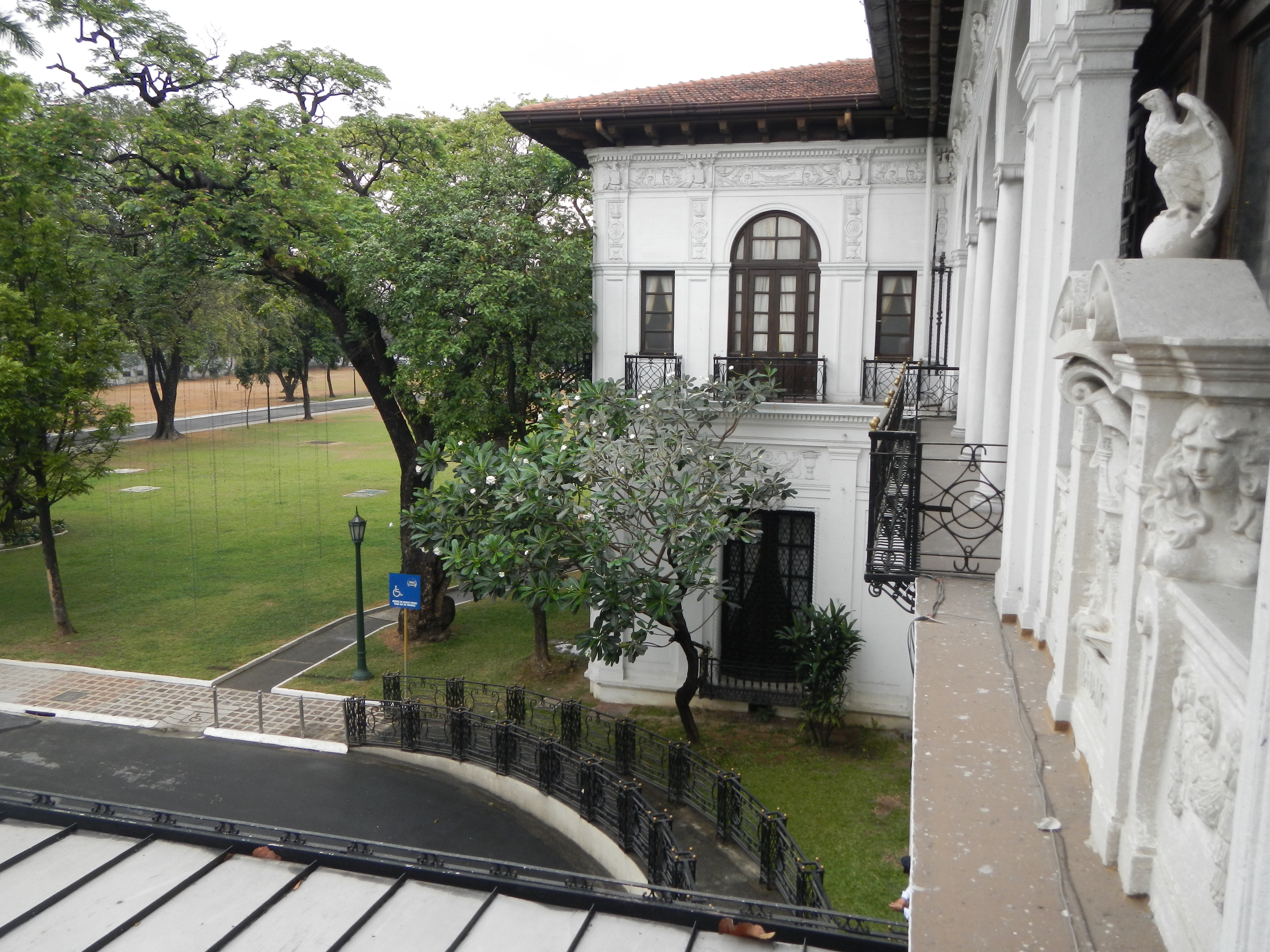
Kalayaan hall built during American era.

Malacañang Palace survived the Second World War, the only major government building left standing after the Bombing of Manila. Only the southwest side of the palace—which would have been the State Dining Room and its service area—was damaged by shelling. During the Second World War, in 1942, the Japanese turned Malacañang into a gilded prison, having served as the official residence of the Japanese-installed President of the Second Philippine Republic, Jose P. Laurel. Quezon moved the seat of government to Corregidor, the headquarters of General Douglas MacArthur.

=== Efforts of Macapagal ===
By the time President Diosdado Macapagal moved to the palace, it required immense repair and restoration works. His wife, Eva Macapagal, initiated a massive beautification project that drove sidewalk vendors away from the grounds and turned muddy areas into landscaped gardens.

=== Later years ===
The longest residents of the palace were President Ferdinand Marcos and his wife, Imelda, who resided there from December 1965 to February 1986.

On January 30, 1970, four days after the fifth State of the Nation Address (SONA) of President Marcos, student activists were able to storm Gate 4 of the palace with a captured fire truck and threw stones and molotovs into the buildings and palace grounds before the Presidential Guards Battalion came out in full force and repulsed the militants. Later reports would state that damages to property reached between P500,000 and P1 million. In combination with rising civil unrest, Martial Law was declared in 1972 and the palace complex and its surrounding neighborhood were closed to the public.

The Pasig River had developed a foul odor by the 1970s and had become a breeding ground for mosquitoes. Between 1978 and 1979, Imelda Marcos oversaw the reconstruction of the palace. The palace was expanded with the façades on all four sides moved forward. The presidential quarters were enlarged on the front along J.P. Laurel Street, destroying the small garden and driveway leading to the private entrance, while a new dining room and expanded guest suites were built on the main entrance front. On the side facing the river, the Ceremonial Hall was built to replace the azoteas, veranda and pavilion. A larger presidential bedroom was constructed on the remaining side, with a disco at roof level. The layout of the old rooms was retained, although the rooms themselves were enlarged and new bedroom suites inserted into what had been part of the garden.

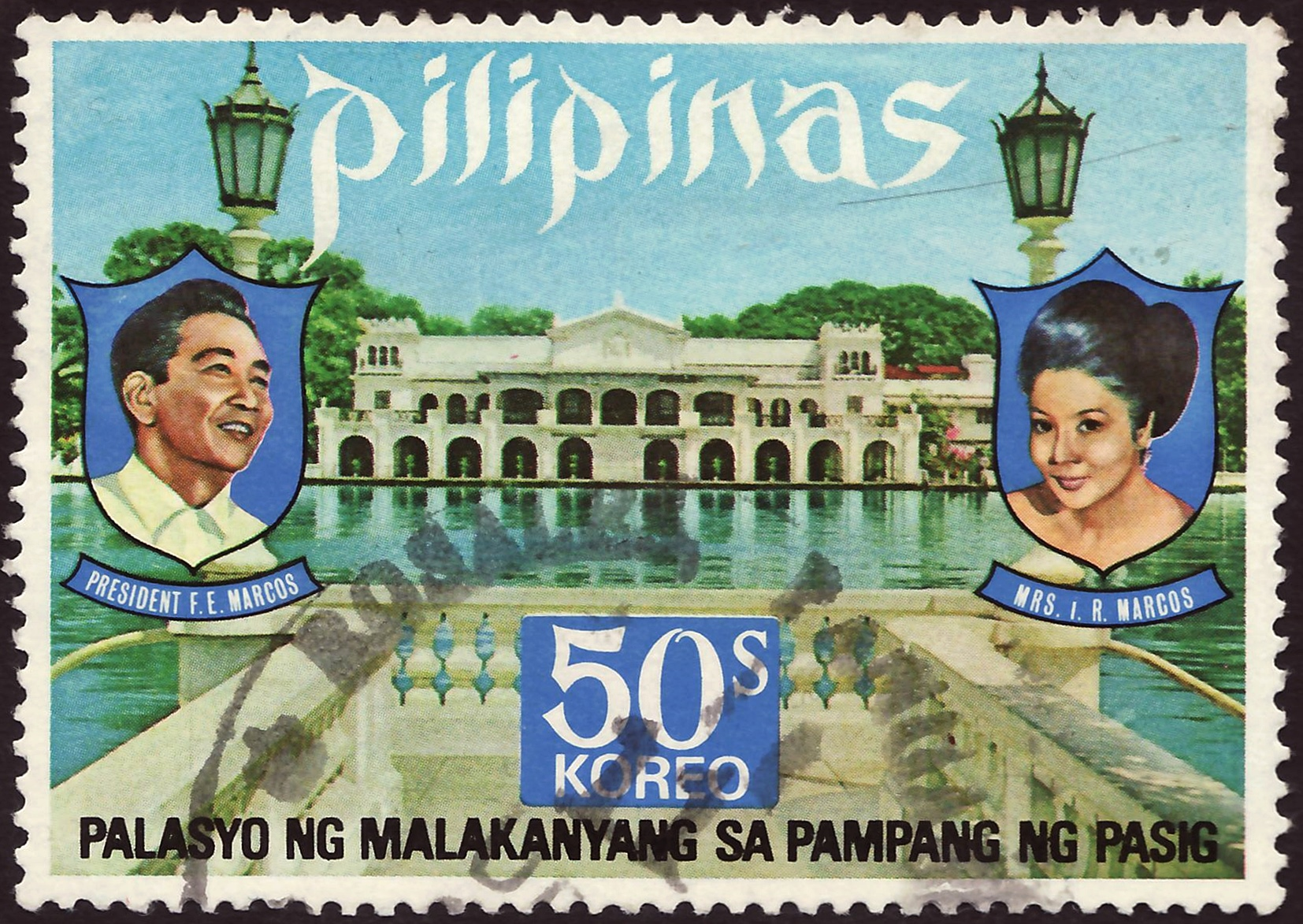
1973 commemorative stamp of the issue "Presidential Palace in Manila"; with a view of the palace frontage and the portraits of President Ferdinand Marcos and his wife Imelda Marcos (as First Lady of the Philippines)

The old palace was gutted almost entirely, not only to meet the needs of the presidential family, but also because the buildings had been weakened by patch up renovations over a century that had resulted in unstable floors and leaking roofs. The building was now made of poured concrete, concrete slabs, steel girders and trusses, all concealed under ornate hardwood floors, panels and ceilings. It was fully bullet-proofed, cooled by central air-conditioning with filters, and had an independent power supply. Architect Jorge Ramos oversaw the reconstruction, which was closely supervised by Imelda Marcos. The refurbished palace was inaugurated on May 1, 1979–the Marcos' silver wedding anniversary.

Several changes were implemented to further beautify Malacañang Palace. The servants' quarters building (now the Premier Guest House) was transformed, and the veranda overlooking the Pasig River was walled up to become the new Maharlika Hall. Across the river, a guest house was constructed. It was situated on the grounds of Malacañang Golf Club and was called Bahay Pangarap (Dream House).

When Marcos was overthrown in the 1986 People Power Revolution, the palace complex was stormed by protesters who roamed the grounds. The international media subsequently exposed the excesses of the Marcos family that the latter had left at the palace before fleeing to Hawaii, including Imelda's infamous collection of thousands of shoes. Some of these excesses included 15 square feet of a sunken bathtub with a mirrored ceiling and an altar with a 19th-century religious statuary of ivory with gold-embroidered robes. The main palace was later reopened to the public and was converted into a museum for three years.

In an effort to distance herself from her predecessor, President Corazon Aquino chose to live in the nearby Arlegui Mansion but held government affairs in the Executive Building. Her successor, President Fidel Ramos, followed suit. After the Second EDSA Revolution, security in the palace was tightened due to attempts against the government. Ramos' wife, Amelita Ramos, restored Bahay Pangarap, which became an extension of the Malacañang Ceremonial Hall. The chapel was also retained, despite Ramos being a Protestant.

President Gloria Macapagal Arroyo, who had once resided in Malacañang during the term of her late father, President Diosdado Macapagal, chose to live again in the main palace after her accession in 2001.

Former presidents Benigno Aquino III, Rodrigo Duterte and president Bongbong Marcos chose to reside in the Bahay Pangarap, which was later renamed as Bahay ng Pagbabago/Bahay Pagbabago and more recently, Bahay Pangulo.).

== Buildings ==
=== Malacañang Palace ===
Malacañang Palace is the main palace and the most recognizable building in the complex. It contains 10 current main existing halls, some restored from historical times.

==== Entrance Halls ====
Official visitors to Malacañang Palace use the Entrance Hall. Its floor and walls are of beige Philippine marble. Straight from the entrance hall are the doors to the Grand Staircase leading to the state reception rooms. To its left is the Palace Chapel and the passage to the right leads to Heroes Hall.

The doors leading to the Grand Staircase depict the Philippine mythology of Malakas (Strong) and Maganda (Beautiful), the first Filipino man and woman, who emerged from a large bamboo stalk. The present resin doors were installed in 1979, replacing wrought iron and painted glass doors from the American period depicting Lapu-Lapu and the other Mactan chieftains who felled Ferdinand Magellan.

A pair of lions used to stand guard on each side of the doors to the Grand Staircase. The lions were originally at the vestibule of the Ayuntamiento Building in Intramuros. They were apparently discarded during the 1978–79 renovations. Wooden benches dating back to the American regime that were in the Hall were transferred to the private entrance that led directly to the living quarters of the palace.

==== Heroes Hall ====
From the Entrance Hall, viewers walk through a mirrored passage hung with about 40 small paintings of famous Filipinos painted in 1940 by Florentino Macabuhay. The adjoining large room was originally the Social Hall, intended for informal gatherings. It was renamed Heroes Hall by First Lady Eva Macapagal, who commissioned Guillermo Tolentino to sculpt busts of national heroes.

In 1998, the National Centennial Commission installed three large paintings specially commissioned for the place. The one in the vestibule is by Carlos Valino, while the two others are by a group of artists headed by Karen Flores and Elmer Borlongan.

The painting in the vestibule is chronologically the second of the three, depicting events of the Propaganda Movement (led by Marcelo H. Del Pilar, José Rizal, and others) and the Philippine Revolution from the formation of the Katipunan by Andrés Bonifacio, to the sewing of the Philippine flag, the Proclamation of Independence at Kawit, and the Malolos Congress. At Heroes Hall itself are the other two paintings.

For viewers entering from the vestibule, the painting on the left shows key events from the earliest times (arrival of the ancient Filipinos and the Manunggul Jar) through Lapu-Lapu and the death of Magellan, the Moro resistance to Spanish rule, the Basi Revolt, and Gabriela Silang, to the 1872 martyrdom of the priests Gomez, Burgos and Zamora.

The painting on the right begins with the Battle of Tirad Pass and Gregorio del Pilar and other events of the Philippine–American War, the Independence Movement under Osmeña and Quezon, events of the Japanese occupation, and the presidents of the Philippines all the way to the Marcoses, President Corazon Aquino, and President Fidel V. Ramos.

The Hall, as large as the Ceremonial Hall directly above, received a mirrored ceiling in 1979 and for the rest of the Marcos era was used not only for meetings and informal gatherings but also for state dinners in honor of visiting heads of state. Dinner was usually followed by a cultural presentation, after which formal toasts were offered by the president and the guest of honor.

==== Grand Staircase ====
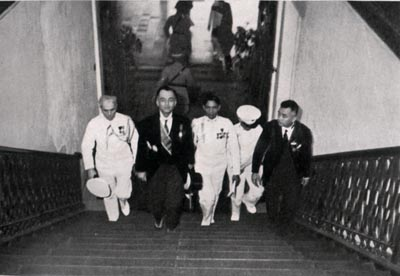
President Manuel L. Quezon ascending at the Malacañang Palace Grand Staircase

Past the Malakas and Maganda doors of the Entrance Hall is the Grand Staircase, made of the finest Philippine hardwood and carpeted in red. Its walls are made of tiny pieces of wood, assembled to simulate sawali panels. These were put up in 1979 replacing the stucco and hardwood panels. At the top of the stairs is the landing that serves as a vestibule to the Reception Hall.

The Spanish and American governors-general and Philippine presidents and their visitors used this staircase. The staircase was narrower before the Marcos reconstruction. There is a story that José Rizal's mother, Teodora Alonzo, went up these stairs on her knees to beg the Governor General Camilo Polavieja for her son's life.

A legacy of the Spanish regime are unsigned portraits of Spanish conquistadores Hernando Cortés, Sebastian del Cano, Ferdinand Magellan, and Christopher Columbus, hanging at the balcony around the stairs. At the end of the balcony a harvest scene by Fernando Amorsolo hangs.

A large painting of Nereids (sea nymphs) by noted Spanish artist Joaquín Sorolla used to hang in place of the Luna. A case of Marcos war medals, subsequently alleged to be fake, took its place towards the end of the Marcos regime. The case continued to be on display, empty, for some years thereafter.

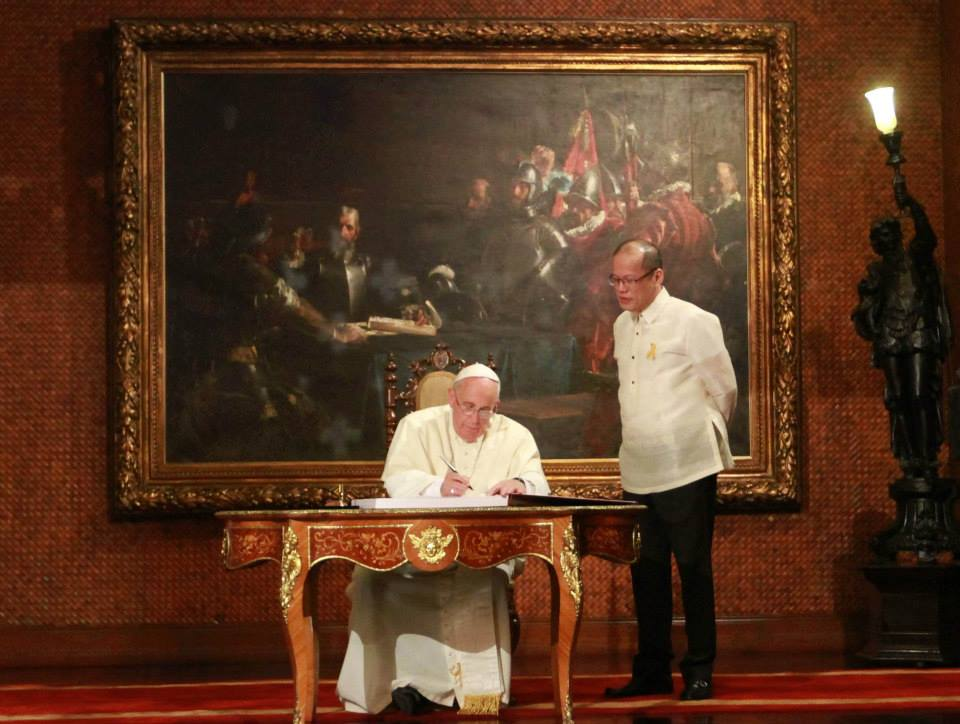
President Benigno Aquino III witnesses as Pope Francis signs the palace guestbook, the 'Blood Compact' painting in the background.

To the left, as viewers reach the top of the stairs, is the famous 'The Blood Compact', painted by Juan Luna in 1886, still in its original carved frame. It was given to the government in return for the artist's scholarship in Spain. The door on the left leads to the private quarters of the presidential families. This wing contained the private dining and living rooms and two guest suites, used for meetings and waiting rooms between 1986 and 2001, while presidents Corazon Aquino and Fidel Ramos lived at the Arlegui Guest House and President Estrada lived at the Premier Guest House. President Arroyo and her family lived in this wing. The door straight ahead leads to a corridor that surrounds the inner court within the private quarters.

==== Reception Hall ====
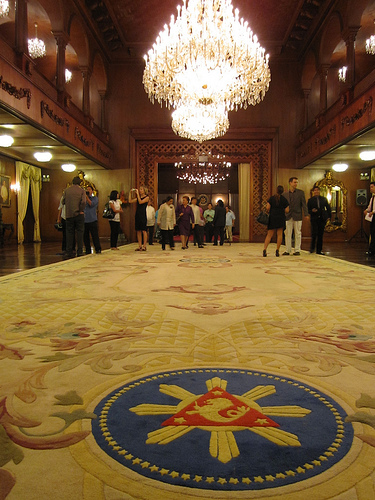
Reception Hall of Malacañang Palace

Visitors assemble in this room prior to a program or state function at the Ceremonial Hall beyond, or while waiting to be received by the president or the first lady at the Study Room or the Music Room to its left, or before entering the State Dining Room on the right.

This room was the largest in the palace before the 1979 renovation. The most prominent features of the Reception Hall are the three large Czech chandeliers bought in 1937 by President Quezon. During the Second World War, they were carefully disassembled prism by prism and hidden for safe-keeping. They were taken out and reassembled after the war.

Official portraits of all Philippine presidents are on the walls, from Emilio Aguinaldo, president of the Malolos Republic, to Rodrigo Duterte, painted by Fernando Amorsolo, García Llamas and other noted artists. The first portrait of President Arroyo in this hall was a photograph taken by Rupert Jacinto. That of President Fidel Ramos is unique on three counts – it is on a narra plank rather than on canvas, the likeness as well as the decorations along the sides are painstakingly signed on the wood, and it was a gift of the artist, Gaycer Masilang, a prisoner serving a life sentence.

An elaborate ceiling was installed in the 1930s, carved by noted sculptor Isabelo Tampingco who depicted vases of flowers against a lattice background. Large mirrors, gilt sofas and armchairs, and Chinese bronze pedestals holding plant and flower arrangements decorate the Hall. The Tampingco woodwork was curved and in some eyes gave the room a coffin shape. This is supposedly why in the 1979 renovation, the Tampingcos were replaced with two facing balconies.

==== Rizal Ceremonial Hall ====
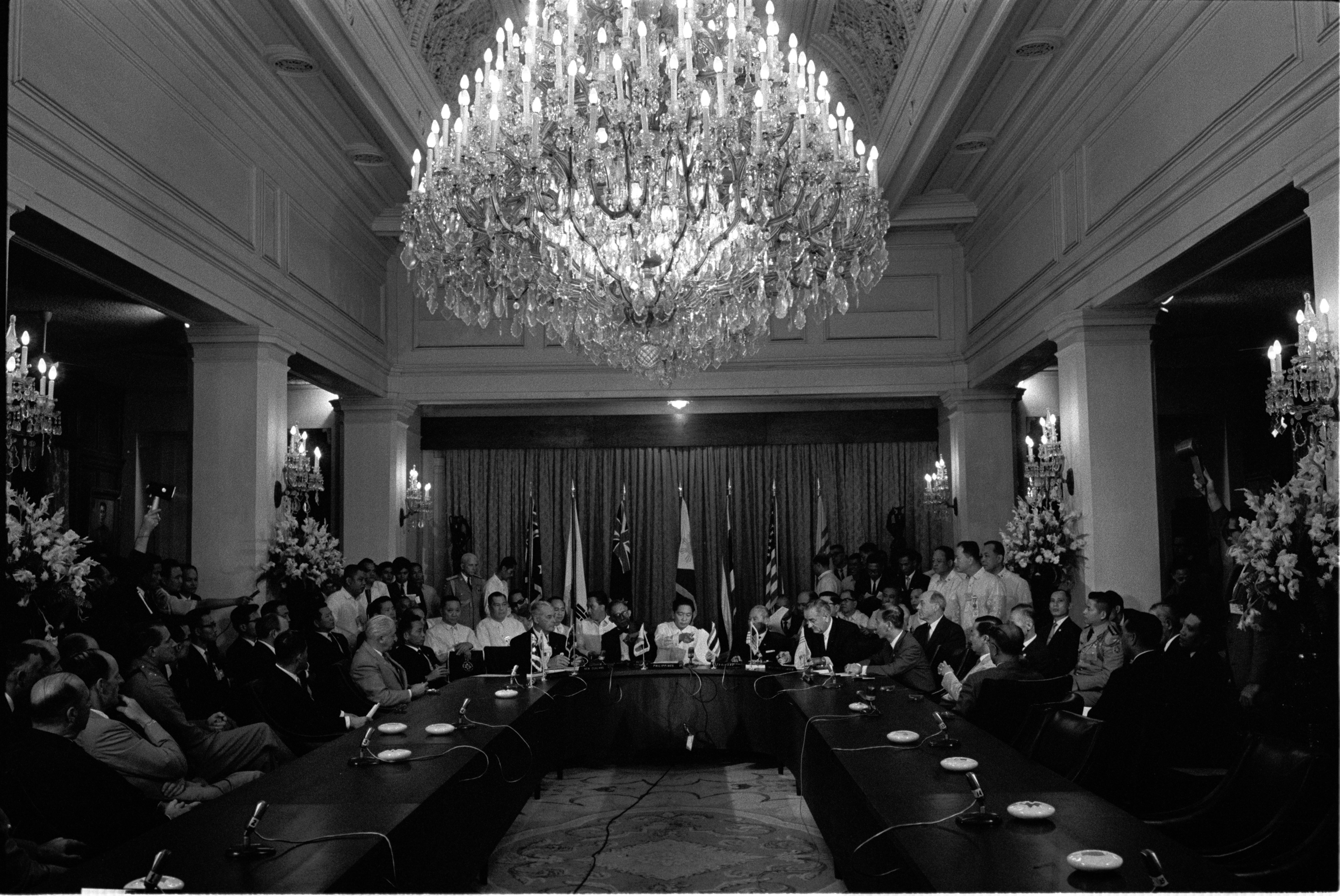
President Ferdinand Marcos presiding over a meeting during the Manila Conference of SEATO nations

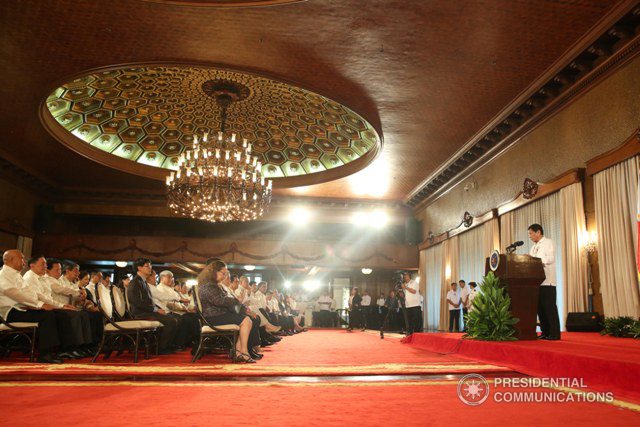
President Rodrigo Duterte speaks before the audience during an oath-taking ceremony of new officials in October 2016.

This room, also known as the ballroom, is the largest in the palace today. It is used for state dinners and large assemblies, notably the mass oath takings of public officials begun by President Ramos. The upholstered benches are lined up for guests on such occasions. When the room is used for state dinners, the benches are removed and round tables are set in place. Orchestras sometimes play from the minstrels' galleries at the two ends of the hall.

Three large wood and glass chandeliers illuminate the hall. Carved and installed in 1979 by the famous Juan Flores of Betis, Pampanga, the chandeliers are masterpieces of Philippine artistry in wood.

The hall used to be much smaller and was in effect merely an extension of the Reception Hall. It had a concave ceiling similar to those of old Philippine homes, and glass doors opening to verandas on three sides overlooking the Pasig River and Malacañang Park. Many an al fresco party was held here, with round tables set on the azoteas and verandah for dinner and the Ceremonial Hall, doors thrown open, cleared for dancing. Fireworks lit the skies promptly at midnight from the park across the river at New Year's Eve parties. The azoteas (covered patios), verandas and the intimate pavilion in the middle were combined in 1979 into the present enormous Ceremonial Hall.

A recurring palace ritual is the presentation of credentials when a new ambassador arrives. During the Marcos administration and prior to the 1979 renovation, new ambassadors presented their credentials in a ceremony. A flourish of trumpets accompanied the arriving ambassador as he mounted the Grand Staircase and marched the full length of the Reception Hall. The yellow-gold curtains to the old Ceremonial Hall were parted to reveal the president standing alone at the far end, with members of the Cabinet lined up on the left. The ambassador presented his documents of credence to the president, who handed them to the foreign secretary. The president then delivered his welcome speech and offered a champagne toast to the head of state of the ambassador's home country. The ambassador then delivered his response, offered a toast to the president, and after small talk, left in another burst of trumpets.

Presidents Corazon Aquino and Ramos were less formal, receiving new ambassadors in the Music Room without a ceremony. The old rituals were revived by President Estrada. Am arriving diplomat disembarks from his car at General Solano Street and boards what the presidential staff calls a "chariot", a luxurious open jeep where the occupant stands on a red carpet holding onto a stout bar while progressing up J.P. Laurel Street to the palace grounds. He receives military honors in the garden outside the main entrance and to fanfare, is escorted up to the Reception Hall. He marches through two columns of guards in gala uniforms to present his credentials to the waiting president.

==== State Dining Room ====
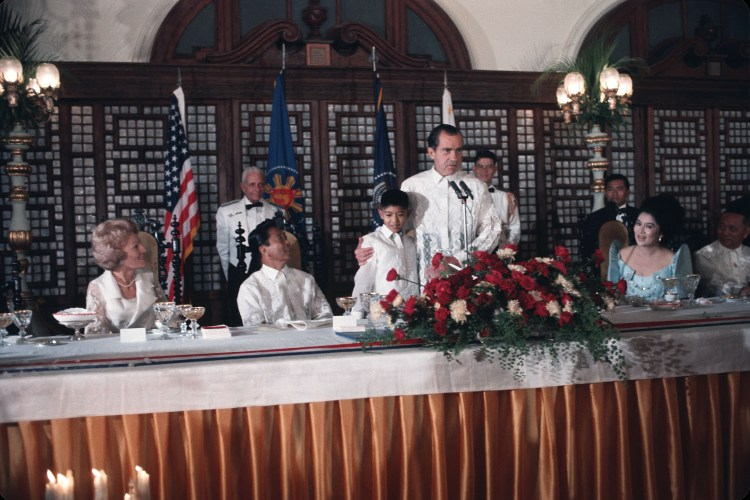
Richard Nixon with the young Bongbong Marcos during a state dinner hosted by Philippine President Ferdinand Marcos

The State Dining Room is used mainly for Cabinet meetings. Before the 1935–1937 renovations, this room was the ballroom of the palace. This is where presidents dined with state guests and official visitors. A long adjustable table can accommodate up to about fifty guests. The president would sit at the center of the table and the first lady would sit across from him. The finest glassware (Irish Waterford and French Saint-Gobain) and china (Limoges and Meissen) in the collection were brought out on special occasions. The chandeliers are Spanish, from the Ayuntamiento Building in Manila, as are the gilded mirrors installed within since the Spanish regime.

Two paintings dominate the room. The larger is a fiesta scene by National Artist Carlos "Botong" Francisco – a pair of tinikling dancers, a serenade, churchgoers, boatmen, and other vignettes of rural life. Commissioned for the Manila Hotel, it originally hung in one of the hotel lobbies but was transferred to Malacañang Palace in 1975. The other painting is an early Amorsolo rural scene.

The room was widened and a mirrored ceiling installed in 1979. Previously, there was a long dining table at center and the decorations consisted of heavy crimson velvet curtains, large gilded mirrors and elaborate chandeliers.

Beyond is a smaller room just as long but narrower than the dining room called the Viewing Room. The room was intended for Cabinet meetings and film showings. The room proved rather small and was rarely used as such. It was more frequently used to hold buffets for people meeting in the State Dining Room. Another result of the 1979 renovation, this room occupies what was before a veranda overlooking the palace driveway and garden.

The State Dining Room is also where Emilio Aguinaldo was kept prisoner after his capture by the Americans in Palanán, Isabela in 1901. In his autobiography The Good Fight, Manuel L. Quezon wrote that "in April 1901, I had walked down the slopes of Mariveles Mountain, a defeated soldier, emaciated from hunger and lingering illness, to place myself at the mercy of the American Army." Quezon, suffering from malaria, was also instructed to verify that Aguinaldo had in fact been captured. In Quezon's words,

I was ushered into the office of General Arthur MacArthur, the father of the hero of the Battle of the Philippines. ... [The interpreter]... told General MacArthur in English what I had said in Spanish, namely, that I was instructed by General Mascardo to find out if General Aguinaldo had been captured. The American General, who stood erect and towered over my head, raised his hand without saying a word and pointing to the room across the hall, made a motion for me to go in there. Trembling with emotion, I slowly walked through the hall toward the room hoping against hope that I would find no one inside. At the door two American soldiers in uniform, with gloves and bayonets, stood on guard. As I entered the room, I saw General Aguinaldo the man whom I had considered as the personification of my own beloved country, the man whom I had seen at the height of his glory surrounded by generals and soldiers, statesmen and politicians, the rich and the poor, respected and honored by all. I now saw that same man alone in a room, a prisoner of war! It is impossible for me to describe what I felt, but as I write these lines, forty-two years later, my heart throbs as fast as it did then. I felt that the whole world had crumbled; that all my hopes and dreams for my country were gone forever! It took me some time before I could collect myself, but finally, I was able to say in Tagalog, almost in a whisper, to my General: Good evening, Mr. President.

==== Presidential Study ====
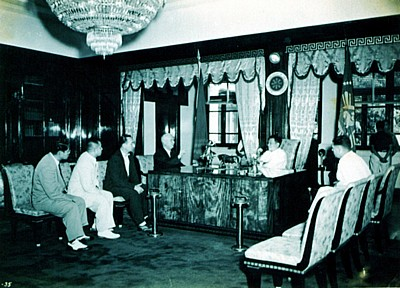
President Ramon Magsaysay (1953–1957) at the Presidential Study, Malacañang Palace

The Presidential Study is the official office of the president, equivalent to the United States' Oval Office of the White House. Formerly known as the Rizal Room, this is where presidents from Quezon to Marcos and then Ramos received their daily stream of callers. It is currently on the second floor of the palace itself, while the old Executive Office at Kalayaan Hall (the old Executive Building) has been renamed the Quezon Executive Office.

The presidential desk is the same in use since the Commonwealth of the Philippines. It was used by all presidents from Quezon to Marcos, who used it officially until 1978 when he used his private study. Marcos had an ornately carved top added to the desk in 1969. It was restored by President Ramos, used by President Joseph Estrada, and restored once more by President Arroyo. She made the study into a conference room with the Council of State table of the Commonwealth as a centerpiece, until she finally restored the room to its original function as the president's office. There is a large chandelier in the study from the 1935–1937 renovations. Behind the presidential study is a small conference room called the Study Conference Room.

==== Music Room ====
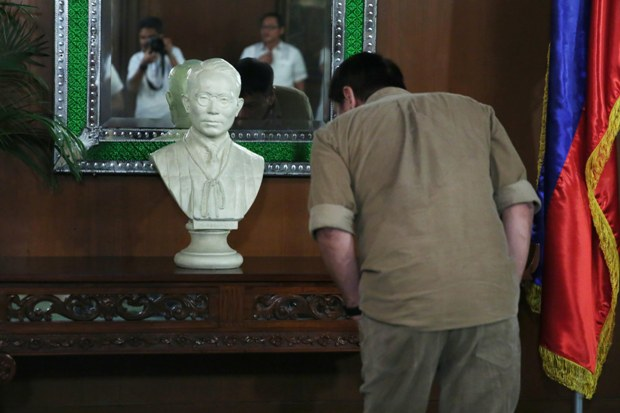
2016-2022 President Rodrigo Duterte looks at a bust sculpture of composer Nicanor Abelardo at the Music Room.

The room's usage changed over the years. It started as a bedroom during the American period before being turned to a library and reception room during the Commonwealth; after the war, it eventually became the Music Room. First ladies customarily received callers in this room. A Luna masterpiece, 'Una Bulaqueña' used to hang above the grand piano. 'A Cellist,' painted by Miguel Zaragoza, hangs as its pendant across the room above the sofa. The wall niches now hold Chinese trees and flowers made of semi-precious stones, where there used to be Guillermo Tolentino sculptures representing the different fine arts and later, large Ming and Qing porcelain vases. A supposed Michelangelo, a stone head, was once in the room.

Imelda Marcos decorated the room in mint green. She would sit on the antique French sofa and the visitors on the armchairs. On rare occasions, small concerts were held here, featuring famous Filipino and foreign musicians.

The room immediately behind the Music Room was set up by Imelda Marcos as her office. It later became President Fidel Ramos' private office. The room beyond was originally a small sitting room and was converted by President Joseph Estrada into his own office. President Arroyo decided to use the room as her office at first. Today, the room is used by the president to receive visitors.

==== Private quarters ====
New presidential couples took their pick of the available bedrooms, each President frequently avoiding the bedroom of his predecessor.

A president with many children or grandchildren usually had problems, particularly when a foreign head of state arrived, expecting to be invited to stay in the palace, such as when Indonesian President Sukarno visited President Quirino shortly after the war, like many personalities who have stayed beforehand in Malacañang over the years. It is recounted that the Prince of Wales, later King Edward VIII, dropped by in the 1920s to play polo. American and Asian heads of state have stayed at Malacañang Palace on visits to Manila.

With three grown children, leaky roofs, noisy air conditioners, and cramped space, the Marcos family decided to expand the palace in 1978. The bedrooms of the president and the first lady were enlarged and suites were built for their children Ferdinand Jr., Imee, Irene, and their niece Aimee. The private living room was expanded and the entire private quarters generally added to or enlarged resulting in the present-day structure.

==== Bedroom Suites ====
The bedroom suites open from the former private dining room, between which is a small sky-lit room that used to be a courtyard. These are furnished with large canopy beds, gilded wardrobes and the like. The King's Room leads to the balcony over the main entrance, from which Pope John Paul II blessed a waiting crowd during his 1981 Philippine visit and which President Arroyo has said was her bedroom as the young daughter of President Diosdado Macapagal.

The rooms are large, furnished expensively, and impressive, but are not quite the stupendous rooms that 'in comparison make Versailles Palace look like a hovel,' as a foreign observer declared.

The Spanish-period Malacañang Palace probably centered on the small, open-roofed inner court that led to all areas of the private quarters. The rooms opening to the Grand Staircase were the Dining and Living Rooms and guest suites of the Marcos period. These became meeting rooms during the Ramos and Estrada administrations and reverted to being the private quarters of the presidential family under President Arroyo.

==== Reception Room ====
This was the family dining room of Presidential families until the 1979 renovation. It used to have a magnificent coffer ceiling in the Filipino-Spanish style. The famous painting of Fabián de la Rosa, Planting Rice, used to hang on one wall. Other paintings, notably those by Fernando Amorsolo, were here and in the adjoining room.

The room beyond was used by the Marcos family variously as a private living room and a chapel. It became Meeting Room No. 1 in the Corazon Aquino, Ramos, and Estrada presidencies. A large Botong Francisco painting of dancers is on one wall. Brought from the Manila Hotel, this artwork is a pair to the one in the State Dining Room.

==== Discothèque ====
The third floor added in 1979 has a roof garden and a discothèque. Reached by elevator, the disco is immediately above President Marcos' bedroom. It was complete with strobe and infinity lights, fog equipment, and the latest in music equipment then. A wide waterfall-fountain plays on the terrace outside the disco and steps lead up to a rooftop helipad. It has apparently been disused since 1986. During the Macapagal-Arroyo administration, it was renovated into a music hall.

==== Paranormal activity ====
Alleged paranormal activity has been reported as occurring in the palace, including one that some identified to be the long deceased valet of President Quezon, who occasionally ministered to favoured guests.

=== Kalayaan Hall ===
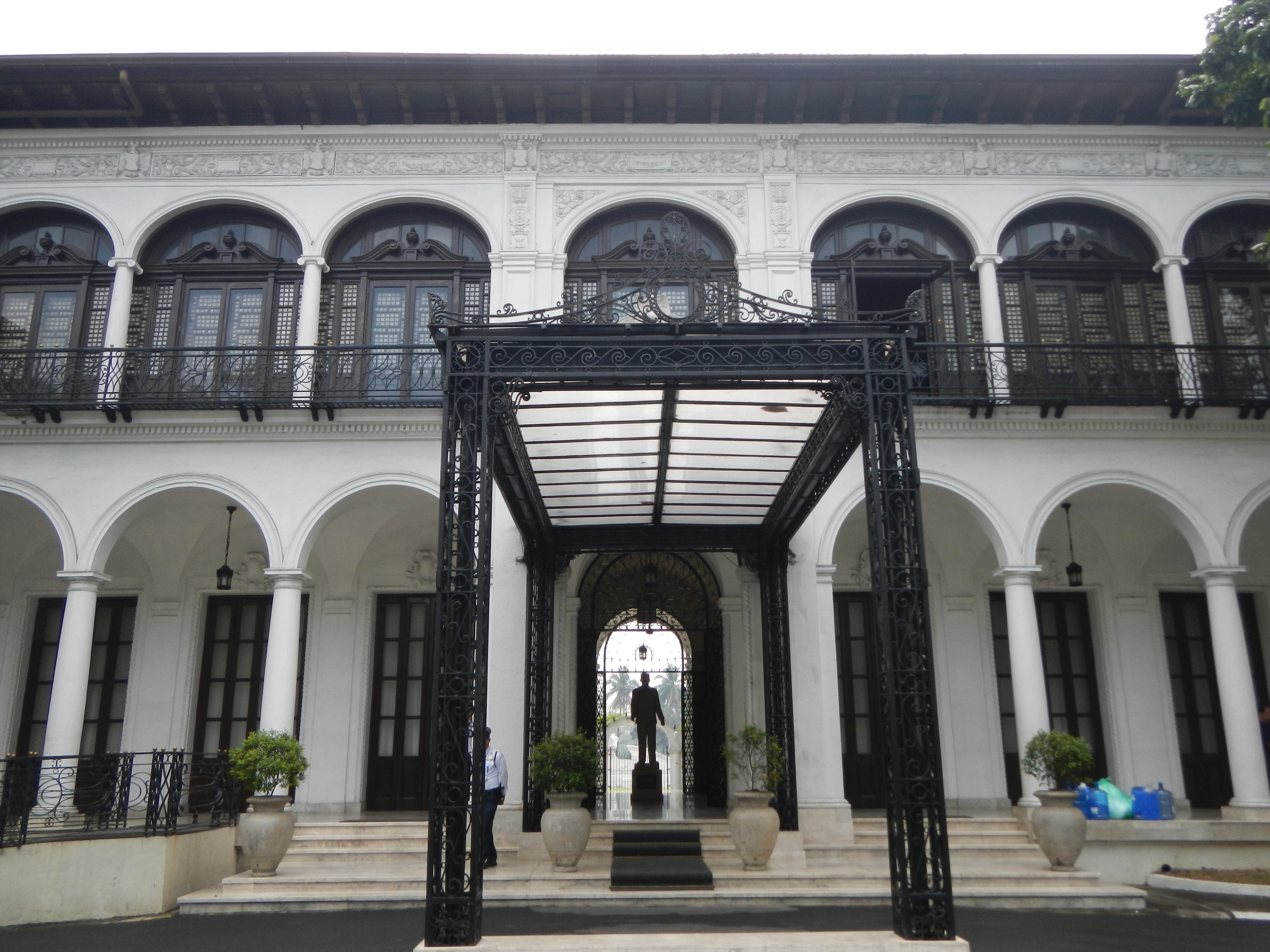
Kalayaan Hall

The old Executive Building, now Kalayaan Hall, has become the oldest structure of the Palace compound after the 1978 reconstruction of the main Palace building. It was built in 1921 by Governor-General Francis Burton Harrison. Once the primary office building in the Palace complex until the end of Ramon Magsaysay's presidency, it was renovated and named Maharlika Hall in the 1970s. Subsequently, it came to be known as Kalayaan Hall after Corazon Aquino became president in 1986 to commemorate the People Power Revolution.

==== Presidential Museum and Library ====
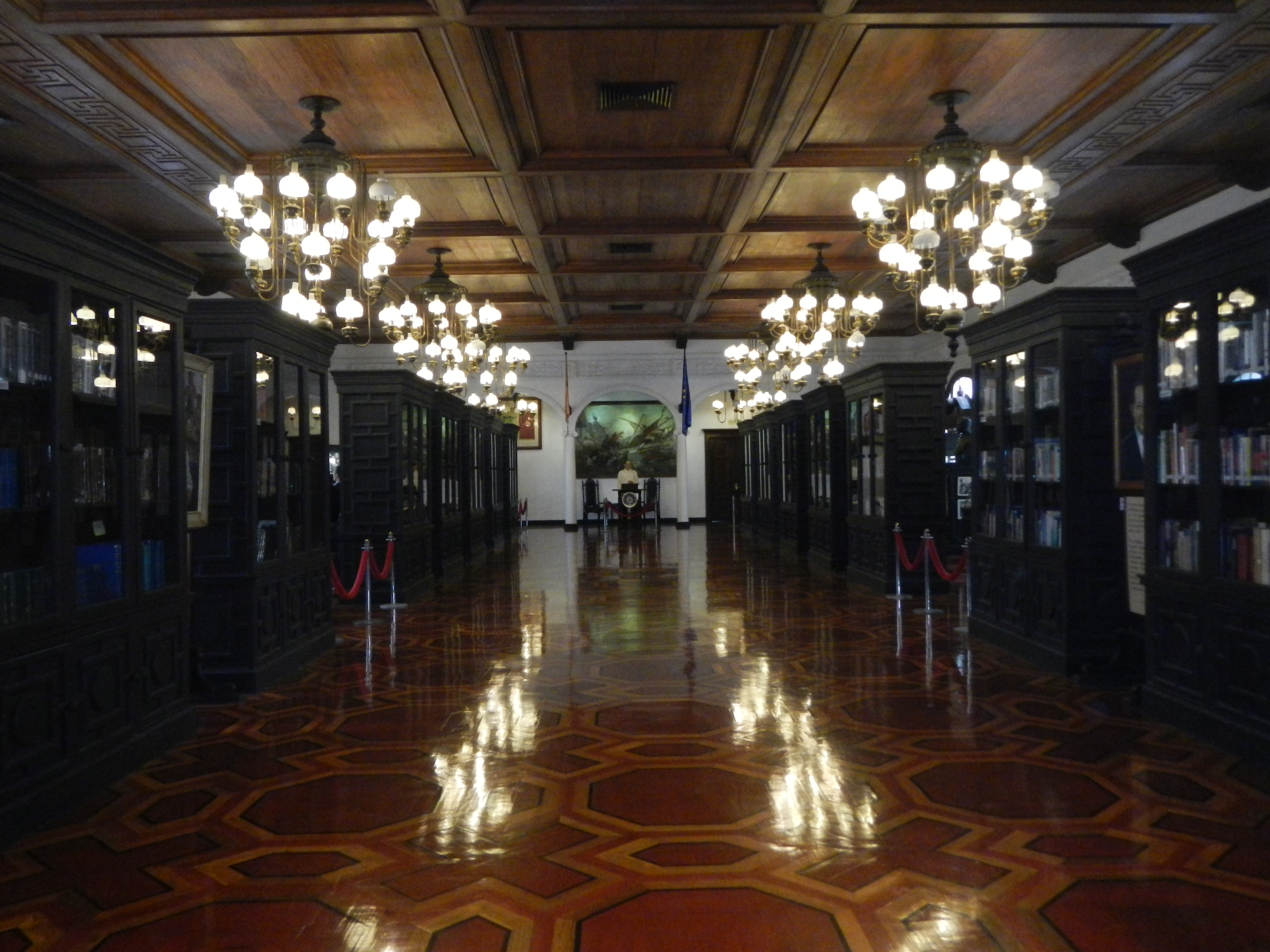
Presidential Museum walkway

The Presidential Museum and Library, formerly Malacañang Museum, the official repository of memorabilia of the president of the Philippines, is located in Kalayaan Hall. It was established in 2004 when the Presidential Museum and Malacañang Library were merged into the Malacañang Museum, then renamed to its present name in 2010. The Gallery of Presidents features exhibits and galleries showcasing the heritage of the presidents beginning with Emilio Aguinaldo to the present. It is composed of objects and memorabilia – including clothing, personal effects, gifts, publications and documents of former presidents as well as artwork and furniture from the palace's collections.

==== Former Presidential Museum ====
Prior to 2004, the Presidential Museum was a distinct entity from the Malacañang Library. The Quezon, Osmeña, Roxas, Quirino, Magsaysay, and García Rooms of the Presidential Museum under the Ramos and Estrada administrations occupied the suites formerly allotted to the Marcos children (Ferdinand, Jr., Imee and Irene) which opened from the inner court corridor. Most of these rooms were added in 1978 when the José P. Laurel Street in front of the palace was moved forward.

=== New Executive Building ===
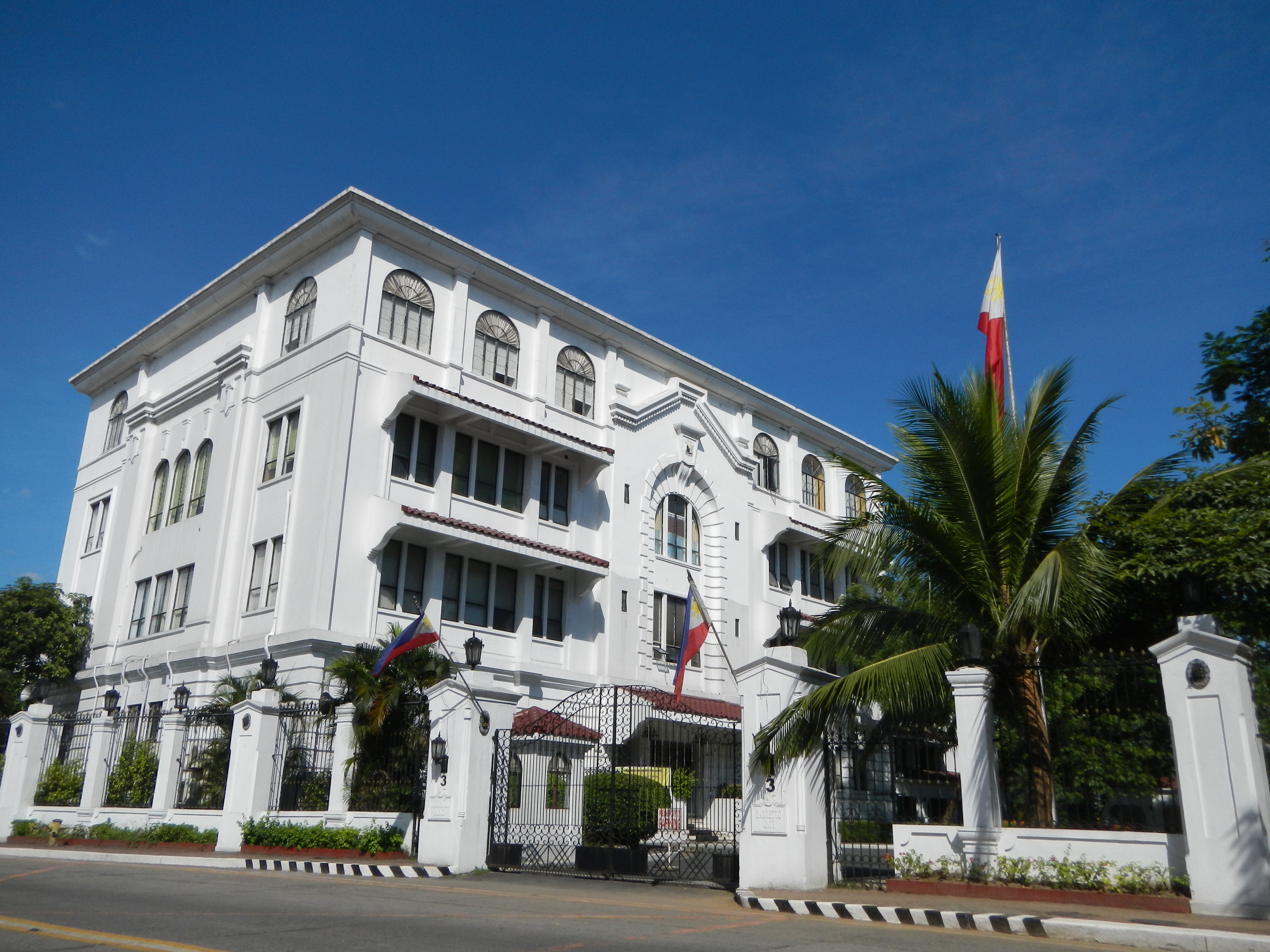
The New Executive Building reconstructed during Corazon Aquino's presidency

On the other side of the palace grounds, beyond the president's residence is the New Executive Building. This was the administration building of San Miguel Corporation until it was bought by the government. President Manuel L. Quezon first proposed the purchase of the nearby San Miguel Brewery as additional office space in 1936. President Ferdinand E. Marcos initiated plans to transform it into an integral part of the palace, the former San Miguel Brewery buildings were demolished upon the expansion in 1978–79, paving way to a park near the San Miguel Church. However, it was in 1989 under President Corazon C. Aquino that its reconstruction and refurbishing as the New Executive Building took place.

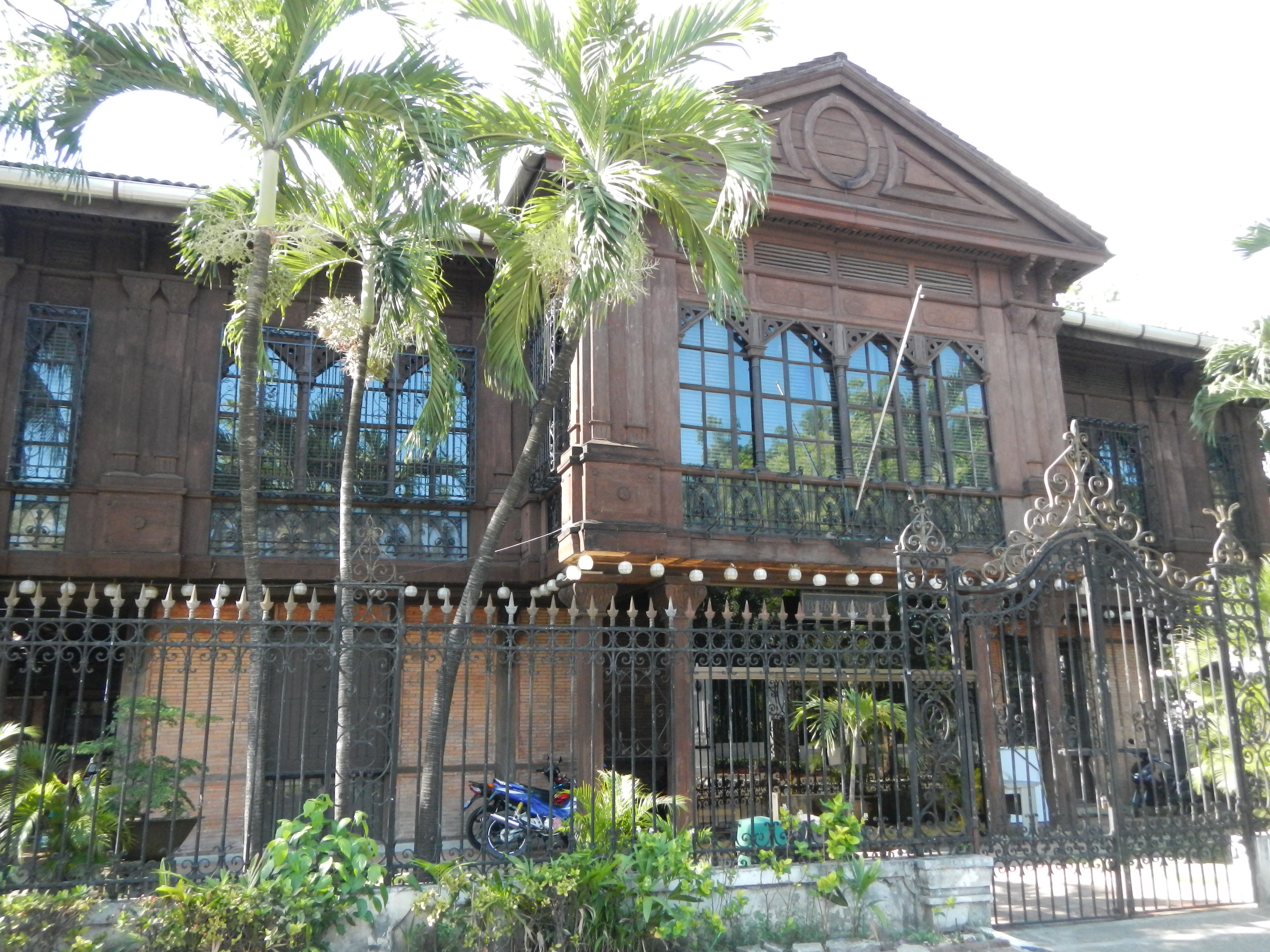
The Bahay Ugnayan, a Spanish colonial house now used as an office

Its architectural elements deliberately pay homage to the palace of the Third Republic of the Philippines. Its utilitarian nature, however, made possible much needed additional administrative space, although its newness and lack of proximity to the palace led to the resumption of the use of the palace itself by Aquino's successors, Presidents Ramos and Estrada. Currently, it houses the Office of the Presidential Spokesperson, Presidential Communications Development and Strategic Planning Office, Presidential Communications Operations Office, and the Malacañang Press Briefing Room. Across the street is a Spanish colonial period house, renamed as Bahay Ugnayan (Ugnayan House), that became the office of Presidential Complaint Center and the 8888 Citizens' Complaint Center. It now serves as a museum for Marcos Jr. and his campaign for the presidency.

=== Mabini Hall ===
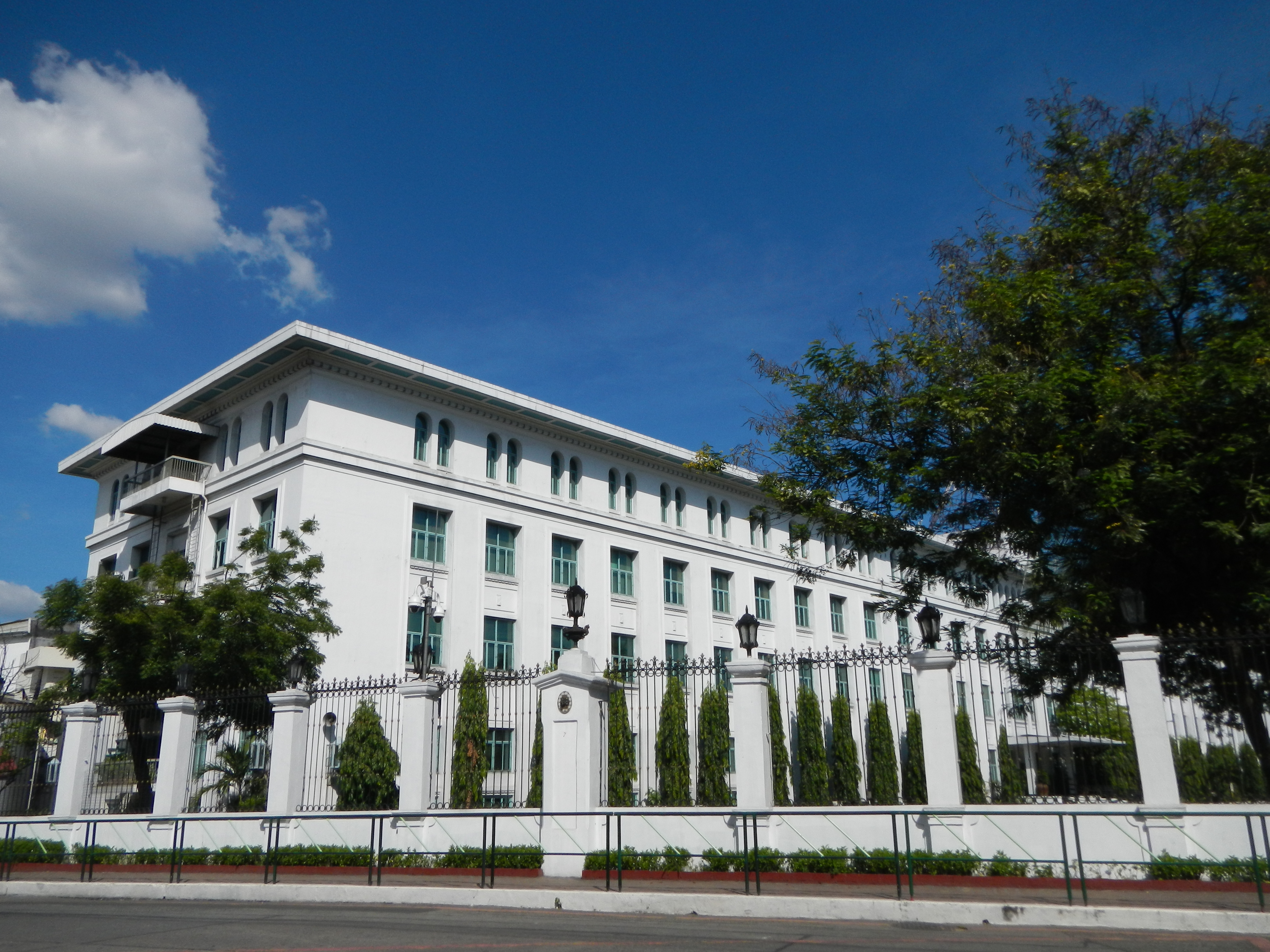
The Mabini Hall houses the offices of the executive secretary and presidential assistants and advisers

The current Administration Building or Mabini Hall on Ycaza Street is the large structure to the left upon entering Gate 4. It began as the Budget Building upon the creation of the Budget Commission (now the Department of Budget and Management) in 1936. After World War II, it temporarily housed the Supreme Court, as the Ayuntamiento building was destroyed during the Battle for Manila in February 1945. After the war, it was later expanded with wings and top floors added. It houses the office of the executive secretary, some units of the Department of Budget and Management, and offices of presidential assistants and advisers. Some offices in this building, particularly those of the Office of Media Affairs, were invaded by an unruly mob on the evening of February 25, 1986, during the storming of Malacañang that capped the People Power Revolution. After it was gutted in a fire in 1992, plans to demolish it and build a high-rise building in its place were completely dropped due to budgetary constraints. President Fidel V. Ramos supervised its reconstruction into a spartan but well-ventilated and lit office complex, and renamed it Mabini Hall, after Apolinario Mabini.

=== Bonifacio Hall ===
The Premier Guest House (now Bonifacio Hall), the glass-fronted building across the garden from the palace's main entrance, was originally built by the American governors-general as servants' quarters to screen off Malacañang from the brewery (San Miguel) next door. The building was remodeled into the Premier Guest House in 1975 for use during the IMF-World Bank Boards of Governors Meeting.

The building, separate from the palace itself, became the temporary residence of the Marcos family while the main palace was being reconstructed in 1978–1979, when repairs were made to the palace after a fire in 1982, and when the air purification system was being improved in 1983. President Corazon C. Aquino used this building as her office from 1986 to 1992. The Ramos administration relegated this building to secondary status despite its integration into the New Executive Building. It was renovated in 1998 as a residence and office for President Joseph Estrada and his family. The bedroom of Estrada and his wife was on the second floor, where President Marcos' bedroom and President Corazon Aquino's office were. President Estrada's office was on the ground floor.

The front of the building facing the garden is a two-story high reception area, with a staircase in the center that leads to the corridor above. The president's office was on the ground floor, near the stairs. On the floor above were bedrooms and the family dining room.

In 2003, President Gloria Macapagal Arroyo renamed this building Bonifacio Hall in honor of Andrés Bonifacio. The private office of President Benigno Aquino III was located at the Aquino Room in Bonifacio Hall. After the building's structural integrity was called into question, Aquino's office was temporarily moved to the Presidential Study on June 21, 2011.

=== Malacañang Park and Bahay Pangulo ===
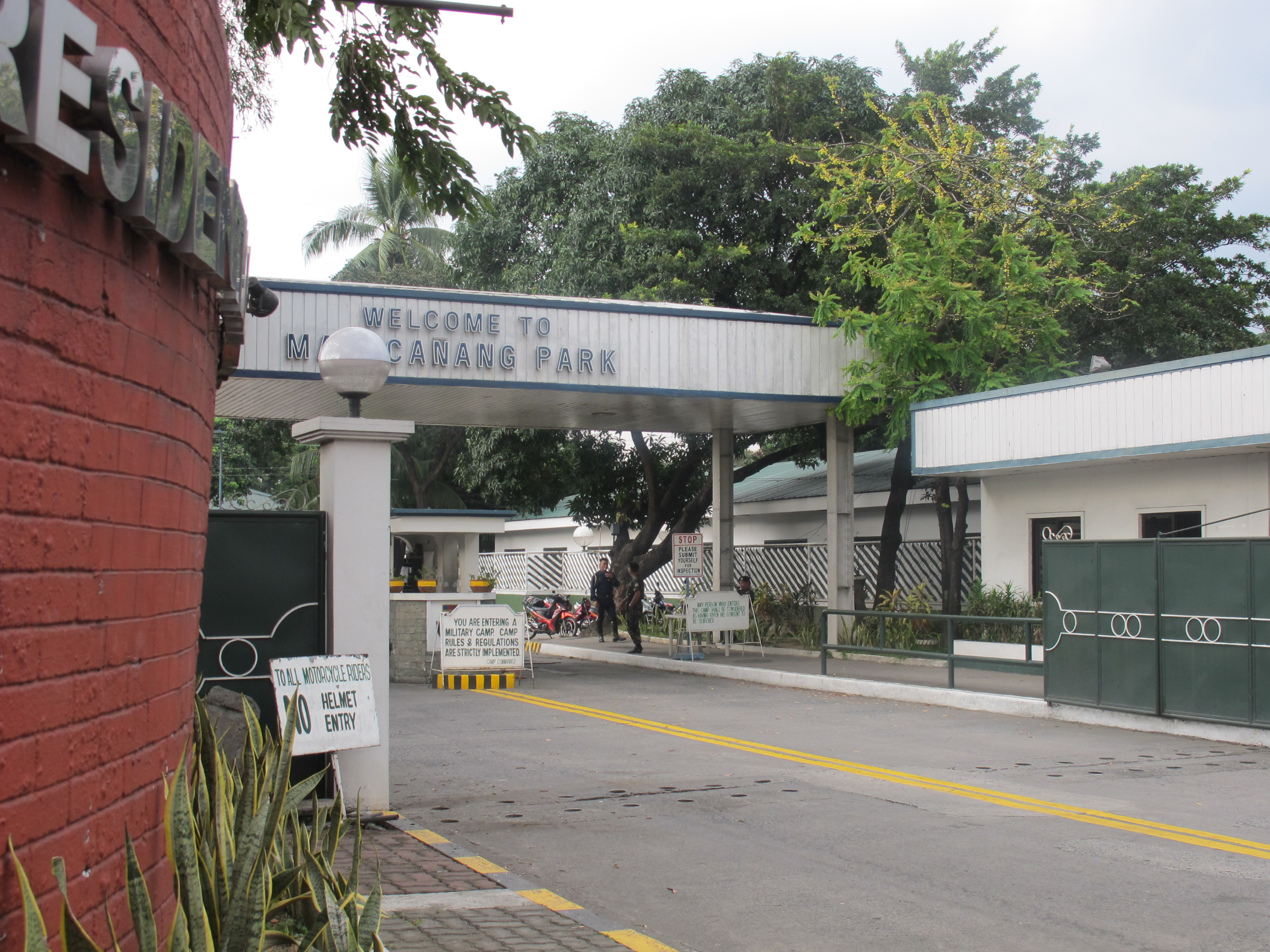
Gate of the Malacañang Park

Malacañang Park, directly across the river from Malacañang Palace, adjoins the Mabini Shrine and the present headquarters of the Presidential Security Command. The park features a Recreation Hall, a small golf course and the guesthouse Bahay Pangulo, the official private residence of the President of the Philippines.

The park was created when the rice fields and grasslands of Pandacan on the south bank of the Pasig River were acquired on orders of President Quezon in 1936–1937. Intended as a recreational retreat, it contained three buildings: a recreation hall used for official entertaining, a community assembly hall for conferences with local government officials, and a rest house (which served as the official residence of presidents since Benigno Aquino III) directly opposite the palace across the Pasig River, which would serve as the venue for informal activities and social functions of the president and his or her family. The buildings, constructed by the Bureau of Public Works, were designed by Juan M. Arellano and Antonio Toledo. In addition to the buildings are a putting green, stables, and shell tennis courts.

It is now the official residence of current President Bongbong Marcos, who has lived there since June 30, 2022.

=== Other buildings ===
Satellite facilities outside the palace proper but within the gated palace complex include a television station, two churches and various other guesthouses in addition to the Premier Guest House.

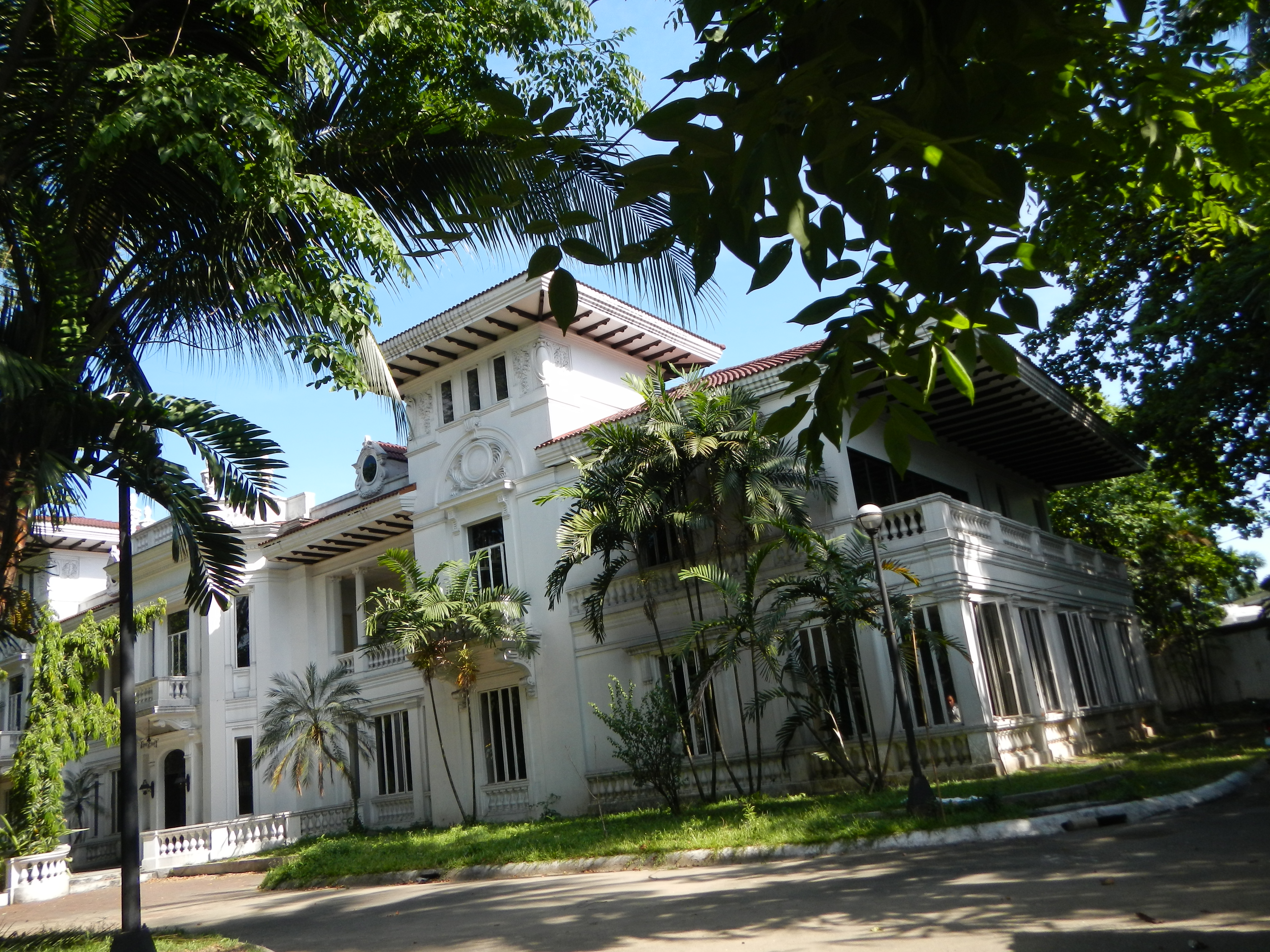
The Laperal Mansion

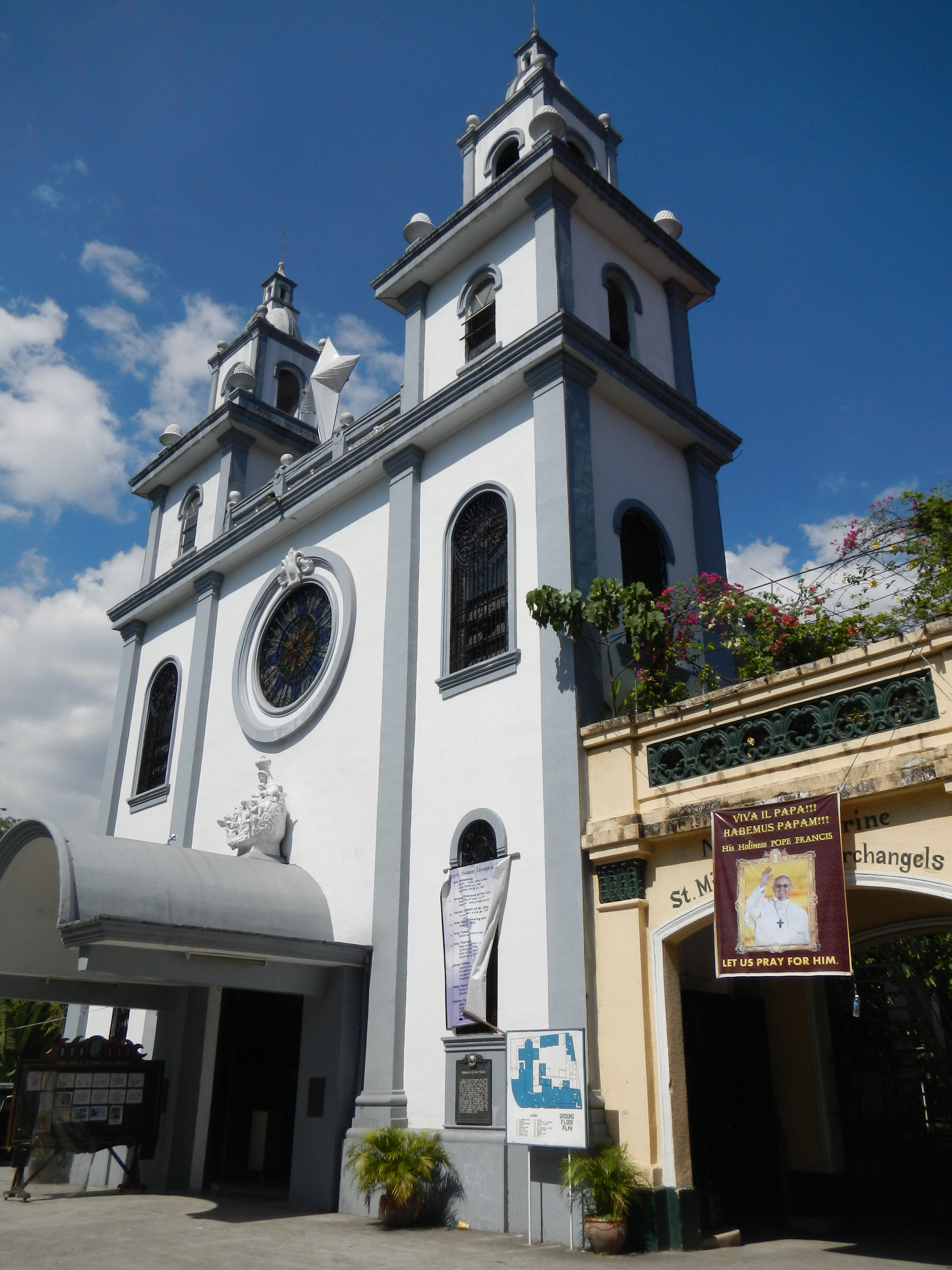
San Miguel Church near Malacañang was declared the National Shrine of Saint Michael, the Archangel in 1986

- Laperal Mansion or the Arlegui Guest House is a remodeled and enlarged 1930s mansion located along Arlegui Street, half a block away. When World War II broke out, it served at one point as the residence of the speaker of the National Assembly established by the Japanese puppet state, Second Philippine Republic, Benigno S. Aquino, Sr., the grandfather of former Philippine president Benigno S. Aquino III. When the war ended, it served temporarily as the National Library. Around the early postwar era that the Laperal family acquired the property. In 1975, the property was seized by presidential security forces under Marcos for "security reasons". The house became the office of the Presidential Economic Staff (precursor of today's National Economic and Development Authority) before former First Lady Imelda Marcos decided to expand the house to grander proportions to become a guesthouse, giving the building two turrets when it used to have one.

After the 1986 People Power Revolution, Corazon Aquino as a symbolic counterpoint to the opulence of the Marcos regime refused to live in the palace as her predecessors had, choosing instead to stay at the Arlegui Guest House. Her successor, Fidel V. Ramos, followed suit and also resided in Arlegui. During Gloria Macapagal Arroyo's term, the house became the Office of the Press Secretary.

- Legarda Mansion was built in 1937 by Filomena Roces y de Legarda, one of the first art deco houses built in Manila. In this house, Alejandro Legarda, the son of doña Filomena, lived with his wife Ramona Hernández, and their four children. Doña Ramona was well known for her lavish parties. The Legarda house is a tribute to doña Ramona, who was known be the nickname "Moning", as it houses La Cocina de Tita Moning, a fine dining restaurant that aims to recreate the wonderful parties of Manila's most elegant era, using heirloom recipes of the Legardas, served on antique china, glassware, and silverware. The house includes a living room with paintings by Félix Resurrección Hidalgo and Juan Luna, don Alejandro's collection of antique radio equipment, a dressing room showcasing the memorabilia of the Legarda women, and the dining room where banquets are held.

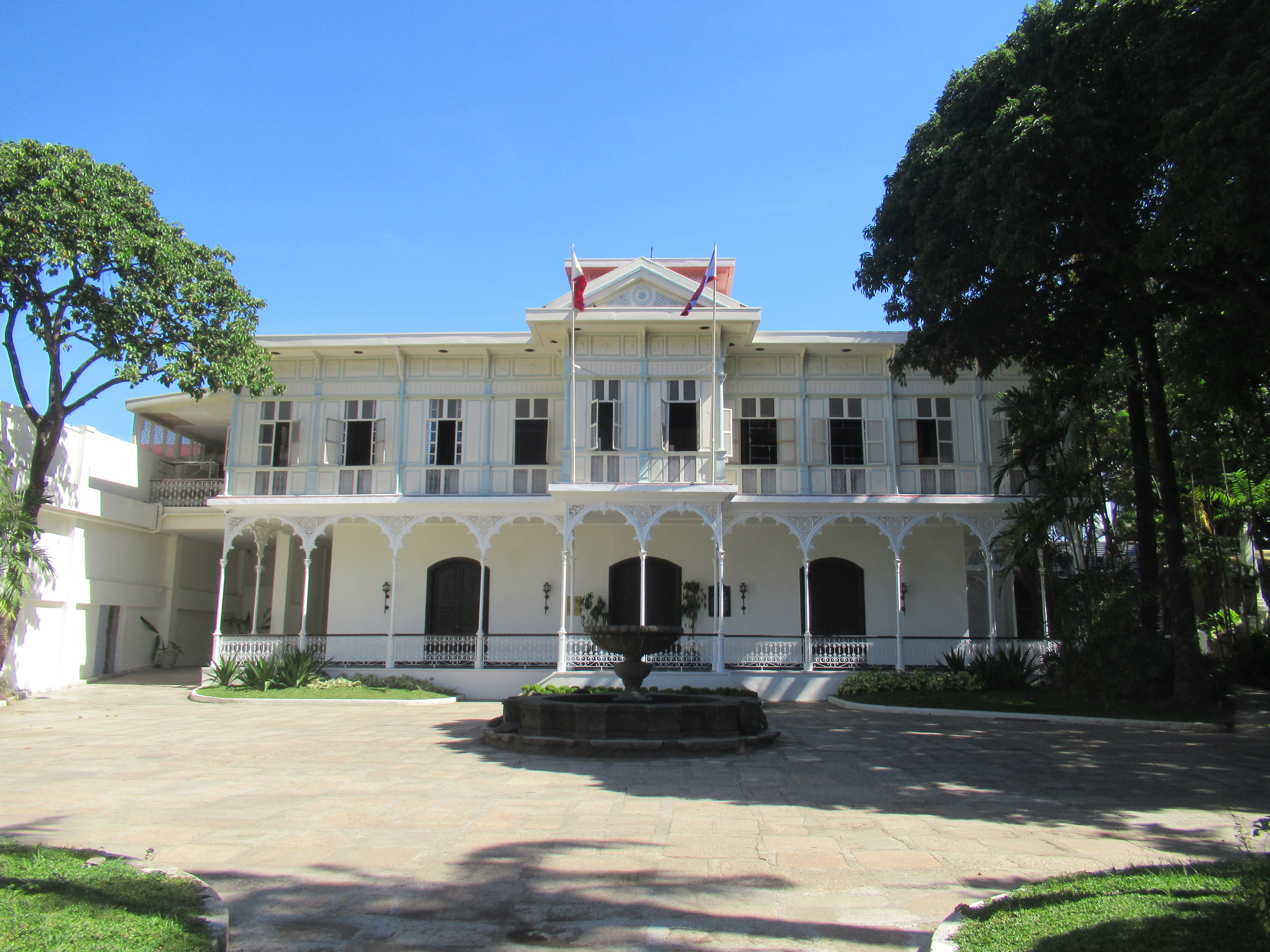
Goldenberg Mansion

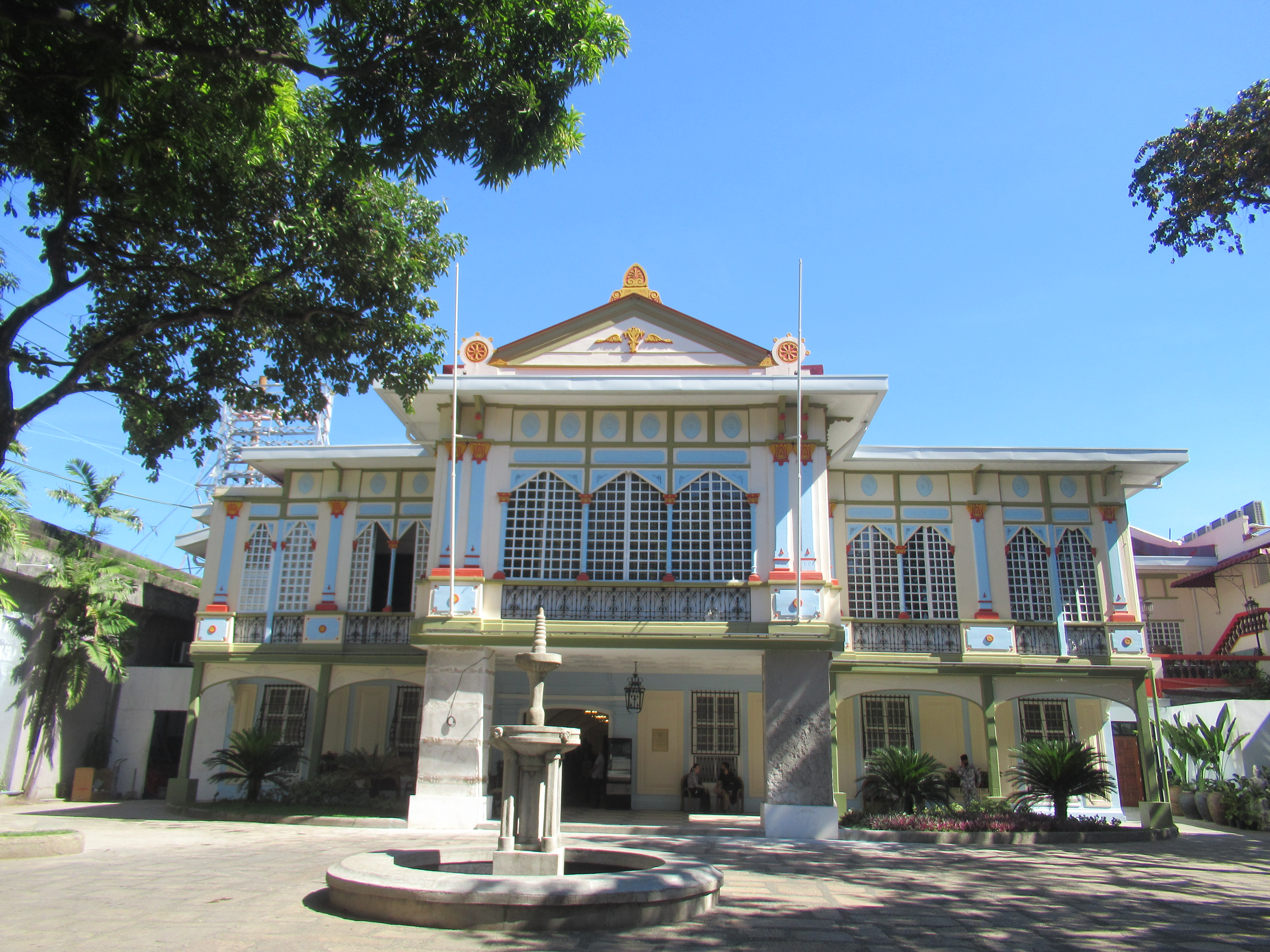
Teus Mansion

- Goldenberg Mansion
- Teus Mansion
- Valdés Mansion along San Rafael St. in San Miguel, near the Plaza Avilés/Freedom Park. Unlike the aforementioned mansions, the house has not been maintained. Nevertheless, it currently serves as one of the offices of the palace's security.
- Presidential Broadcast Staff Radio Television Malacañang (PBS-RTVM) was organized in 1986 following the peaceful EDSA revolt. Before 1986, the organisation that existed was Radio-Television-Movies, and an adjunct of the National Media Production Centre which was based in Malacañang. In 1987, Executive Order Nº. 297 dated July 25, 1987, was signed and issued by President Corazon C. Aquino, creating the Office of the Press Secretary and cites under Section 14 (Attached agencies) the creation of the Presidential Broadcast Staff (Radio-Television Malacañang).

Executive Order No. 297 designated the PBS-RTVM as the entity with the sole responsibility and exclusive prerogative to decide on policy / operational matters concerning the television medium as it is utilised for the official documentation of all the president's activities for news dissemination purposes and video archiving.

PBS-RTVM is involved in television coverage and documentation, and news and public affairs syndication of all the activities of the president, either live or delayed telecast, by national or local, government or private collaborating networks.

- San Miguel Church was established by the Jesuits in 1603 adjacent to the Tripa de Gallina (river bend) and became a parish church in 1611. The church also ministered to Japanese Christians fleeing persecution under the Tokugawa Shogunate in 1615, and since many of these exiles belonged to the samurai, or the warrior class, the church was dedicated to Saint Michael. It was moved to its present location in 1783 under the Parish of Quiapo. The present church, erected in 1918, is notable for the symmetry of its twin bell towers, following the model of European Baroque architecture. The church was declared as the National Shrine of Saint Michael, the Archangel in 1986.

== Gardens ==
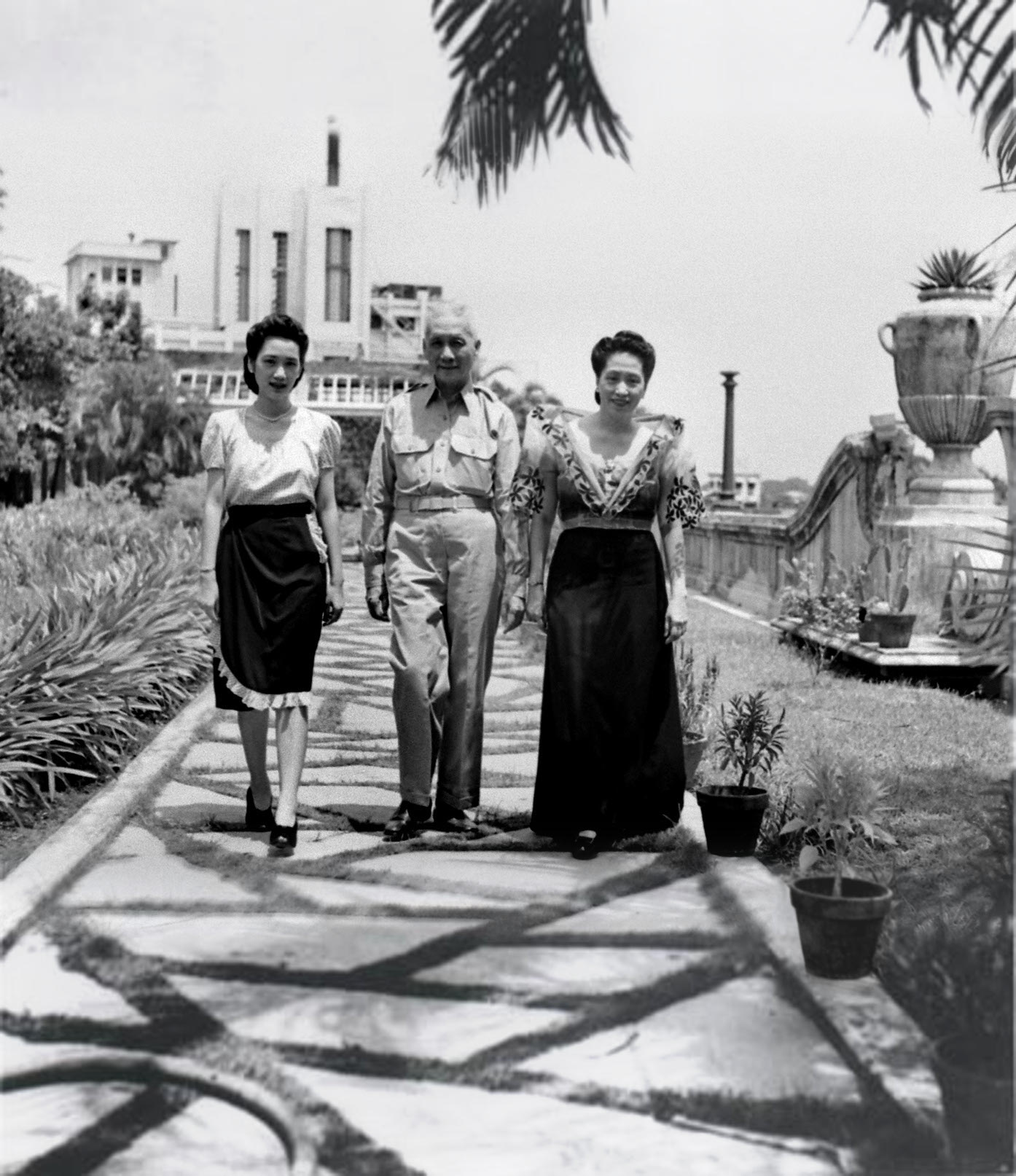
President Sergio Osmeña and his family at the Malacañang gardens (1945)

The extensive grounds of Malacañang comprise one of the few parks in Manila, with tropical shrubbery, century-old acacia trees, and even a balete tree or two. The acacias are festooned with cactus like 'Queen of the Night.' The broad lawns, lush trees and greenery indicate how Manila may have been when it was less populous and times were more leisurely.

The public garden now known as 'Freedom Park' fronts the Administration and Executive Buildings. It has statues symbolizing the four freedoms (religion, expression, want and fear), that were brought to Malacañang from the Manila International Fair of the 1950s. The statues were long forgotten at the cogon field that was then Rizal Park, when First Lady Eva Macapagal retrieved them. An Art Deco fountain from the 1930s still flows near the main Palace entrance. Cannons and lamp posts dating from the Spanish Regime accent odd corners.

A bamboo teahouse, built in 1948 as a rest house, no longer exists, but it used to be by the river near where the swimming pool is now located.

At the main entrance is the large balete tree with a reputed resident kapre. Usually lit with capiz shell globe lights, it is hung with multicolored star lanterns during Christmas. One time only, it was lit with thousands of flickering fireflies, captured from some distant towns where fireflies still abounded and released as a grand ephemeral gesture of a present for the then first lady.

== Security ==
The palace is protected by the Presidential Security Command of the Armed Forces of the Philippines and the Philippine National Police.

== Marker from the National Historical Commission of the Philippines ==
The marker of Malacañang Palace was installed in 1941 by the Philippines Historical Committee (now National Historical Commission of the Philippines).

MALACAÑANG PALACE
THIS WAS THE FORMER SITE OF SUMMER RESIDENCE PURCHASED IN 1802 FROM LUIS ROCHA BY COLONEL MIGUEL JOSE FORMENTO, WHOSE TESTAMENTARY-EXECUTORS SOLD IT TO THE SPANISH GOVERNMENT IN 1825. BY ROYAL DECREES OF 1847, THIS PROPERTY WAS SET ASIDE AS THE SUMMER RESIDENCE OF THE GOVERNOR GENERAL. THE PALACE IN INTRAMUROS HAVING BEEN DESTROYED BY THE EARTHQUAKE OF June 3, 1863, THE GOVERNOR GENERAL MOVED TO THIS PLACE, THEN KNOWN AS THE POSESION DE MALACAÑAN. THIS BUILDING WAS RECONSTRUCTED, NEW LOTS WERE PURCHASED, OLD GROUNDS RAISED, REGRADED AND PARKED DURING AMERICAN AND FILIPINO ADMINISTRATORS. EXTENSIVE IMPROVEMENTS WERE MADE IN 1929–1932 UNDER GOVERNOR GENERAL DWIGHT F. DAVIS AND IN 1935–1940 UNDER PRESIDENT MANUEL L. QUEZON, THE FIRST FILIPINO CHIEF EXECUTIVE TO OCCUPY THIS PALACE.

THE EXECUTIVE BUILDING ADJOINING WAS COMPLETED IN 1939.

== See also ==
- Aguinaldo Shrine
- The Mansion, the official summer residence of the president of the Philippines
- Malacañang sa Sugbo, the official residence of the president of the Philippines in the Visayas
- Malacañang of the South, the official residence of the president of the Philippines in Mindanao
- Malacañang of the North, presidential museum and former official residence of the president of the Philippines in Ilocos Region
- Coconut Palace, commissioned in 1978 as a government guest house
