= Teus Mansion =

Historic house museum in Manila, Philippines

- Mansyon Teus (Filipino)
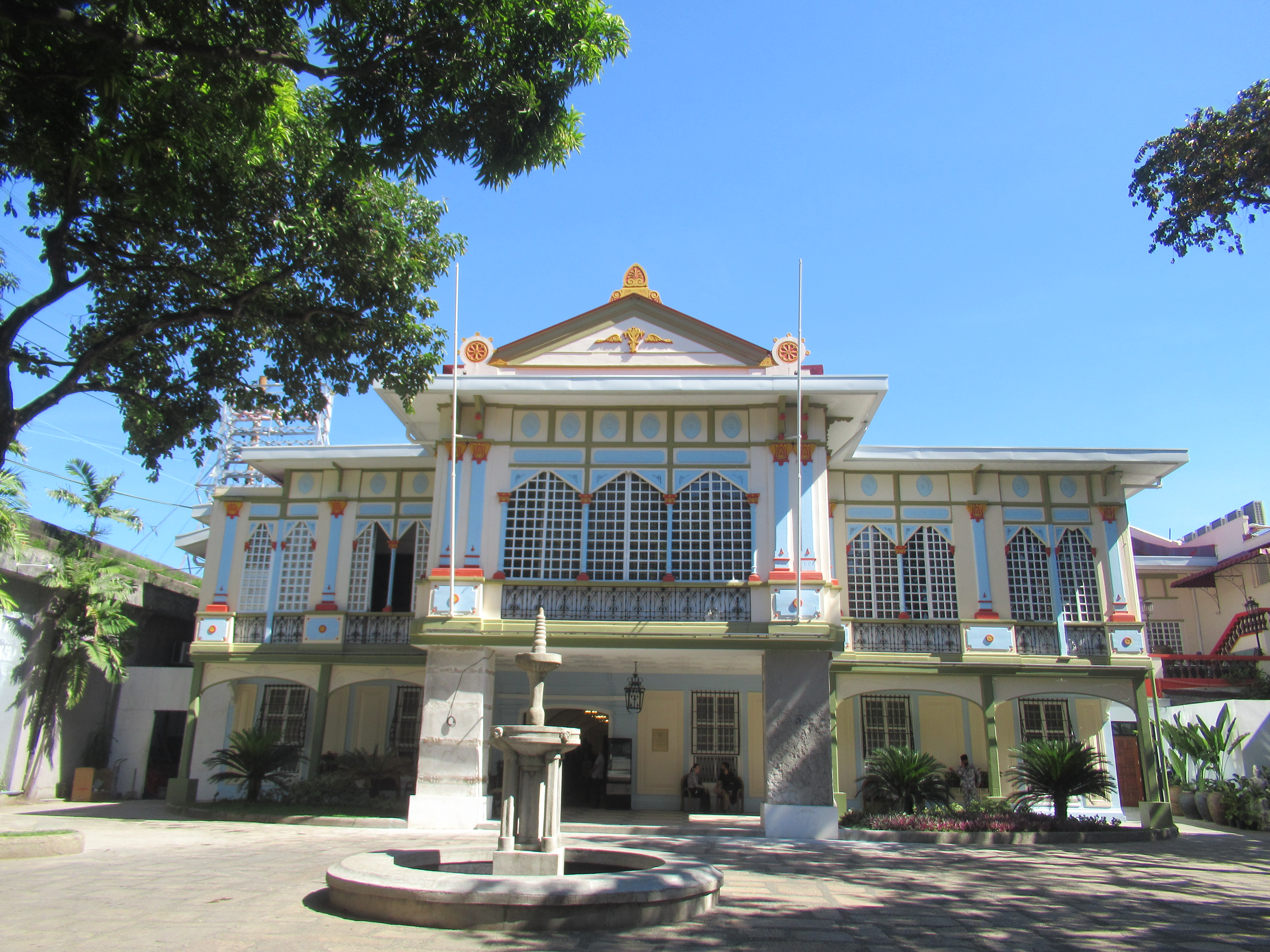
- The mansion in 2023
- Established: circa 1880
- Coordinates: 14°35′30″N 120°59′22″E
- Type: Museum
- Website: museums.gov.ph

Malacañang Heritage Mansions
- Teus Mansion; Goldenberg Mansion; Bahay Ugnayan
- Building details
- Location in Manila Location in Metro Manila Location in Luzon Location in the Philippines

General information
- Status: Completed
- Architectural style: Spanish Colonial
- Location: San Miguel, Manila, Philippines
- Construction started: circa 1880
- Opened: June 1, 2023
- Renovated: 1975 (first renovation); 2022–2023 (second renovation)
- Owner: Government of the Philippines

Design and construction
- Main contractor: Valentin Teus Yrissari

Renovating team
- Architects: Ronnie Laing; Viring de Asis

The Teus Mansion is a historical residence situated in San Miguel, Manila, previously owned by Valentin Teus Yrissari, a Spanish businessman who arrived in the Philippines in 1847. The mansion was once a convent near the San Miguel Church in the district and has been in the possession of the Teus family since Teus's death in 1909. In 1974, First Lady Imelda Marcos acquired the mansion from Teus's daughter, Concepcion. She commissioned British interior designer Ronnie Laing and antique dealer Viring de Asis to restore the mansion in 1975, as a guest house. It is one of the Marcos mansions, or residences acquired during the Marcos dictatorship using ill-gotten wealth from the people's money.

Since the People Power Revolution of 1986, the mansion has belonged to the Government of the Philippines but remained closed to the public. In 2023, the Teus Mansion underwent renovations overseen by First Lady Liza Araneta Marcos and has now been opened to the public as the new Presidential Museum, showcasing artifacts and memorabilia from past Presidents of the Philippines.

== Historical background ==
Teus Mansion takes its name from Valentin Teus Yrissari, a Spanish national of Basque descent who arrived in the Philippines in 1847. Teus subsequently joined Ynchausti y Cia, a company supplying equipment for steamships, before delving into abaca production. It was during this time that Teus acquired a local distillery in Hagonoy, Bulacan. This enterprise later evolved into the renowned Tanduay Distillers, granting the once impoverished Spaniard the means to acquire the mansion.

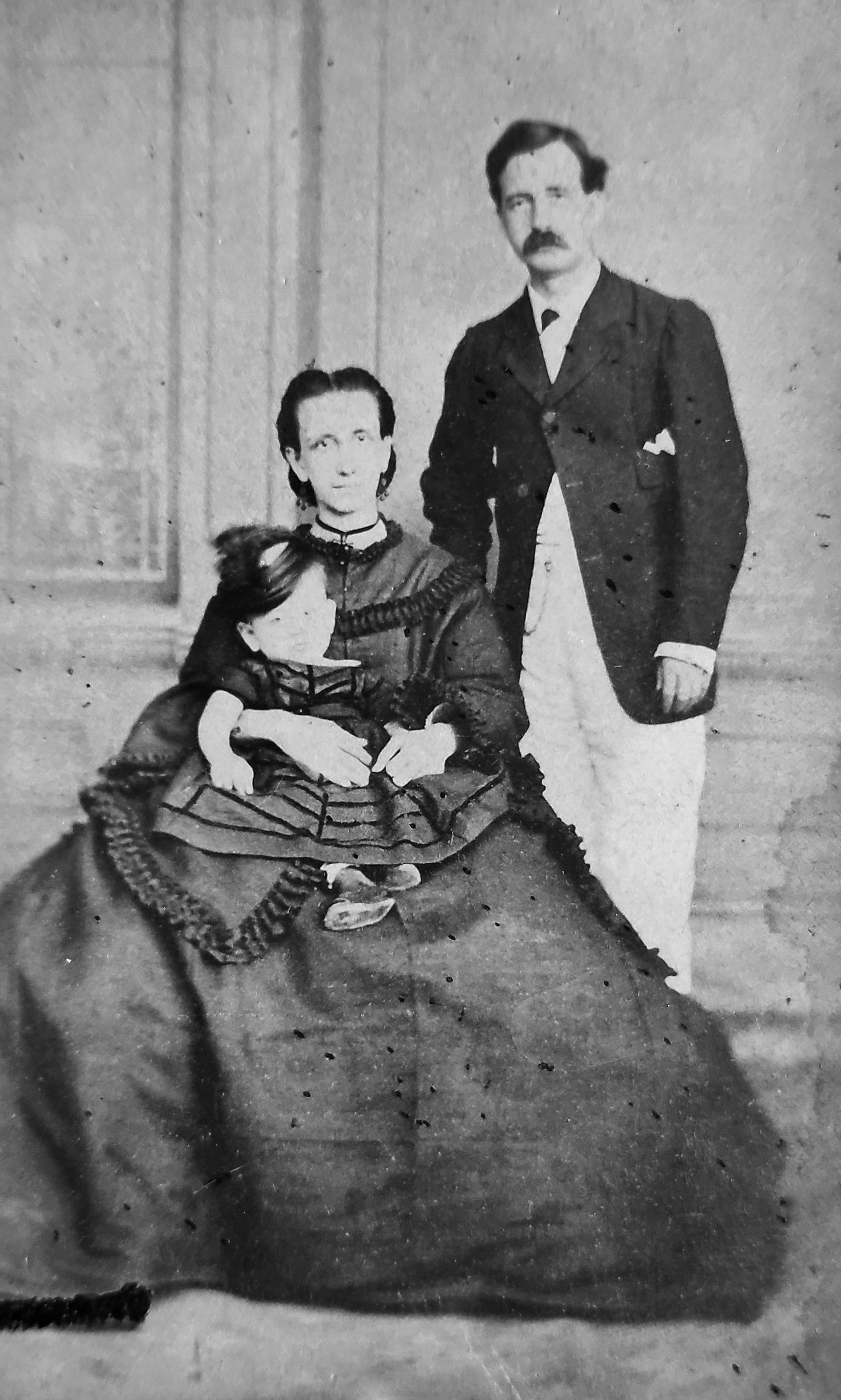
Valentin Teus with his first wife Teresa Ferrater in 1872

In the 1870s, he wed Teresa Ferrater Ponte, the niece of the Spanish Governor General, and purchased the mansion where they resided for many years. Following Ponte's demise in 1892, Valentin remarried Teresa's niece, Maria Dolores Menendez Valdes de Cornellana Ferrater, at San Miguel Church. Their union bore three children: Concepcion (known as Concha), Valentin (or Tito), and Dolores (affectionately called Lolin). Valentin and his family occupied the residence in Manila, periodically journeying to Spain every five years. However, in 1909, Teus unexpectedly died, leaving Dolores to manage the household and the family affairs. After Dolores's own demise, the family eventually relocated to Spain by selling their interests there, with the mansion subsequently inherited by the eldest child, Concepción Teus.

== Purchase by Imelda Marcos and the renovation in 1975 ==
In 1974, Concepción Teus opted to sell the mansion to First Lady Imelda Marcos, the wife of then-President and dictator Ferdinand Marcos She engaged interior designer Ronnie Laing and antique dealer Viring de Asis to renovate the Teus Mansion as a guest residence. The mansion is one of the Marcos mansions and was acquired through ill-gotten wealth during the Marcos dictatorship. Notable guests at the Teus Mansion included the Italian-American socialite Cristina Ford, who was close associate of Imelda.

During the refurbishments by Laing and de Asis, the former dining room has been divided into two bedrooms, and partitions were removed in another bedroom to create a spacious living-dining area. Bathrooms and closets have been cleverly added, concealed behind cabinet fronts. The original downstairs carriageway now serves as an entrance hall. The remainder of the house has been transformed into 12 bedrooms, supplementing the existing five upstairs, giving the old home a total of 17 bedrooms. It also features a large living-dining area, which previously showcased antique European silverware, including works by renowned 18th and 19th-century silversmiths such as Paul de Lamerie and Paul Storr. The mansion also housed several paintings by the American artist Grandma Moses, large vases from the Qing Dynasty, and cabinets containing porcelain and ivory ornaments. Many of these items were reportedly gifted to the Marcoses on their 25th wedding anniversary in 1979, yet were actually purchased by Imelda using funds acquired through illicit means during the dictatorship.

Following the demise of the Marcos dictatorship in 1986, the Teus Mansion and other properties within the Malacañang Palace complex became possessions of the Philippine Government, with restricted access to the public. Some European silverware from the Teus Mansion came under the custody of the Presidential Commission on Good Government (PCGG). Subsequently, the silverware were predominantly auctioned at Christie's in New York on January 10, 1991.

== Reopened as the Presidential Museum ==
On May 12, 2023, President Bongbong Marcos issued Executive Order No. 26 to conserve and protect cultural heritage sites around Malacañang Palace, including the Teus Mansion. The supervision of these properties was transferred to the Social Secretary's Office from the former Office of the Deputy Executive Secretary for General Administration.

Following the initiative of First Lady Liza Araneta Marcos, the Teus Mansion underwent renovation to house collections from the Presidential Museum, formerly located in Kalayaan Hall. The rooms were transformed into galleries exhibiting clothing, souvenirs, gifts, photographs, and memorabilia of Philippine Presidents from Emilio Aguinaldo to Rodrigo Duterte.
