= 1970 Marcos State of the Nation Address protest =

January 1970 protest in the Philippines

The protest during Ferdinand Marcos' Fifth State of the Nation Address on January 26, 1970, and its violent dispersal by police units, marked a key turning point in the administration of Ferdinand Marcos, and the beginning of what would later be called the "First Quarter Storm" a period of civil unrest in the Philippines which took place during the first quarter of the year 1970.

The protest was primarily organized by the National Union of Students of the Philippines (NUSP), and was meant to coincide with the first State of the Nation Address of Marcos' second term. It included "moderate" groups such as the NUSP, who wanted Marcos to promise he would not seek power beyond the two terms allowed him by the 1935 Philippine Constitution; and more "radical" groups such as the Kabataang Makabayan, who wanted more systemic political reforms.

The protest was largely peaceful until the end of the planned program, after which there was a disagreement between the moderate and the radical groups for control over the protest stage. This disagreement was ongoing when Marcos, having finished his speech, walked out the legislative building. President Marcos was jeered by the crowd, which also started throwing pebbles and paper balls, as well as the protest effigies which portrayed a crocodile and a coffin representing the death of democracy, at Marcos and his retinue.

Marcos and his wife Imelda were eventually able to escape to the presidential limousine, leaving the police - consisting of the Manila Police District (MPD) and elements of the Philippine Constabulary Metropolitan Command (METROCOM) - to disperse the crowd. This led to hours of confrontation between the protesters and the police, ending with at least two students confirmed dead and several more students injured.

== Preparations and the protest stage ==
The protest had been organized by the National Union of Students of the Philippines (NUSP, ), a "moderate" student group led by their president Edgar Jopson from Ateneo de Manila University. Jopson and the NUSP had secured the necessary permit for the rally under the banner of the 'January 26 Movement', and announced the rally in a press conference a few days earlier, stating that their cause was to press for a non-partisan Constitutional Convention. It was meant to culminate a series of peaceful demonstrations which had taken place the Monday and Friday before.

As a matter of standard practice for such demonstrations, other organizations were freely welcomed to join the demonstrations and show their support for the cause. Among the groups that decided to join the demonstration were more "radical" groups, including the Kabataang Makabayan, the Samahang Demokratiko ng Kabataan, as well as labor groups and peasant associations.

Placards carried out were made of large calendars distributed by the administration during the campaign, touched up to show the President as Hitler or the First Couple as Bonnie and Clyde. Cardboard emblems of a coffin, a crocodile, and an effigy of the President were displayed around the flagpole.

== Marcos' State of the Nation Address ==
Inside the Congress building Ferdinand Marcos addressed a joint session of the Philippines' bicameral legislature, giving his Fifth State of the Nation Address as president, and the first such address of his second term.

In his speech, Marcos highlighted that year's positive macroeconomic indicators, which he attributed to the four years of his first term. He also emphasized the numerous infrastructure projects of his first term, calling attention to the projects of the Presidential Arm on Community Development. He also discussed the sudden devaluation of the peso against the dollar in the immediate aftermath of his election, saying that the arising challenges would have to be surmounted through "strength of purpose and discipline," calling on citizens "to subordinate [their] personal desires to the needs and aspirations of the nation." Marcos also called attention to the upcoming Philippine Constitutional Convention of 1971, which he said would be a necessary catalyst for social and economic reforms.

== Skirmish between Marcos and the protesters ==
President Marcos left the senate at around five o'clock in the afternoon, the cardboard coffin and crocodile were hurled towards him, the effigy was set on fire, and protesters began to chant. The police then charged into the crowd of demonstrators, scattering them away and allowing for the President and his companions to safely leave the area. Some were taken by the police and retreated into the legislative building. Other democratic activists regrouped, linked arms, marched forward, and chanted: "Makibaka! Huwag matakot!" (Fight! Have no fear!)

== Further dispersal ==
For the next few hours, activists and police continued to have encounters along Burgos Drive. In the heat of the riot, Senator Emmanuel Pelaez intervened for the student demonstrators, rescuing a demonstrator being pursued and requesting the police to withdraw. However, the riot squads did not retreat. The senator was then cheered on by the demonstrators for this gesture and carried him above their shoulders, thus he was exposed to the flying stones from the policemen. At around nine in the evening, the riots still continued and warning shots were fired into the air. The riot died down at around 10 p.m., with most of the demonstrators regrouping elsewhere to ensure the release of their companions who have been arrested earlier.

In the aftermath of the rally, at least two were confirmed dead and several were injured.

== Aftermath ==
The dispersal was met with contempt because of the "unprecedented display of sadism." Students declared a week-long boycott of classes and instead met to organize protest rallies. On the Wednesday that followed, Congress created a joint committee to investigate the "root causes of demonstrations in general."

Since local police units like the Manila Police District (MPD) were under the command of the heads of local government, it was Mayor Antonio Villegas of the City of Manila that commended the MPD for their "exemplary behavior and courage" in protecting the First Couple during the encounter. He then declared that the MPD would no longer be the unit to provide security for protests that involve students, to keep the unit from being exposed to what he called "unfair criticism".

== See also ==
- Martial law under Ferdinand Marcos
- Economy of the Philippines under Ferdinand Marcos
- Edgar Jopson
