= Goldenberg Mansion =

Cultural center in Manila, Philippines

- Mansyon Goldenberg (Filipino)
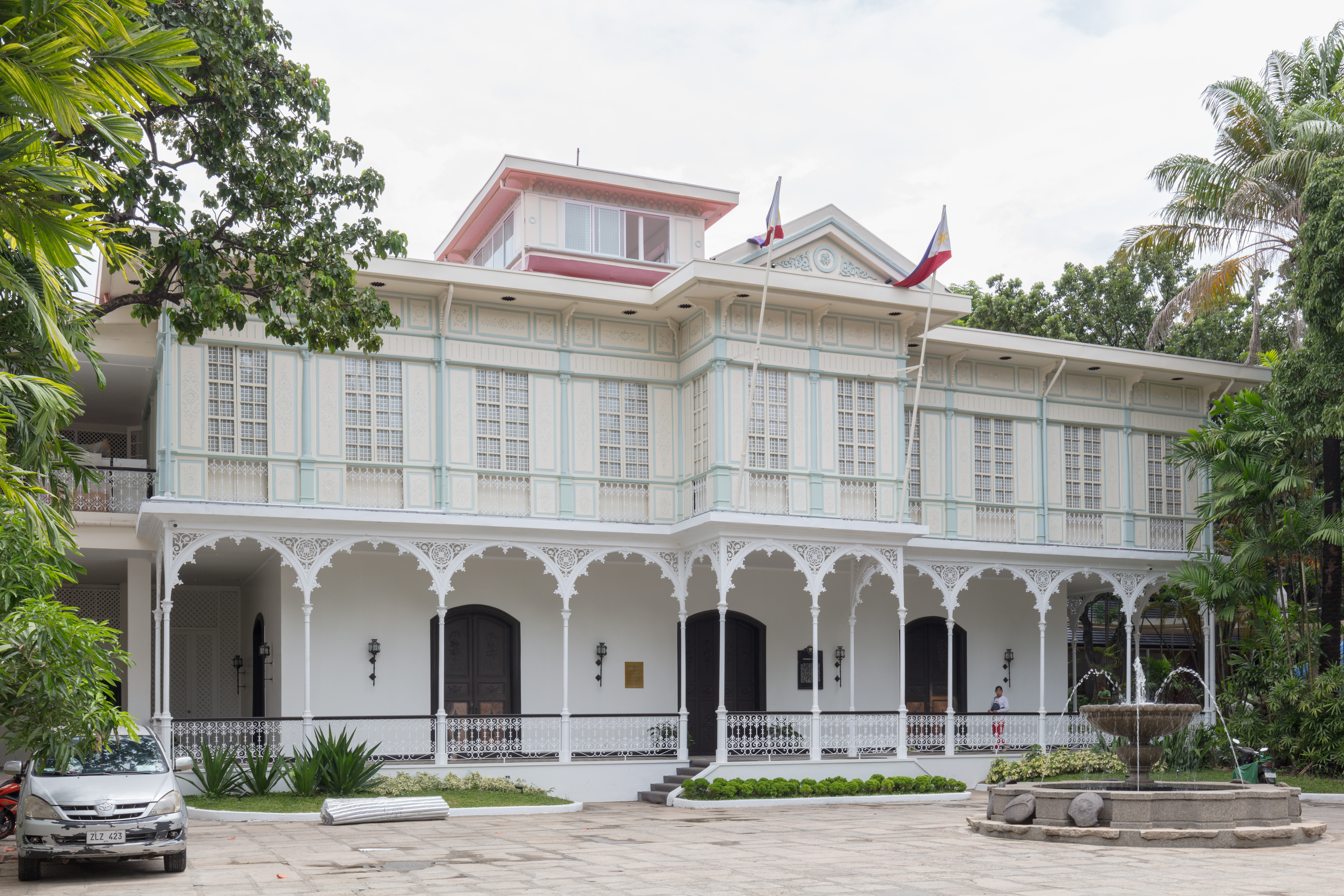
- The mansion in 2023
- Established: circa 1890s
- Coordinates: 14°35′30″N 120°59′22″E
- Type: Cultural center
- Website: museums.gov.ph

Malacañang Heritage Mansions
- Teus Mansion; Goldenberg Mansion; Bahay Ugnayan
- Building details
- Location in Manila Location in Metro Manila Location in Luzon Location in the Philippines

General information
- Status: Completed
- Architectural style: Moorish Revival
- Location: San Miguel, Manila, Philippines
- Construction started: circa 1870s
- Opened: June 1, 2023
- Renovated: 1966 (first renovation); 2022–2023 (second renovation)
- Owner: Government of the Philippines

Design and construction
- Main contractor: Jose Moreno Lacalle

Renovating team
- Architects: Leandro Locsin (first renovation); Michael Manalo (second renovation); Jonathan Matti (second renovation)
- Renovating firm: Leandro V. Locsin Partners; Michael Manalo; Jonathan Matti Design Consultants

National Historical Landmarks
- Type: Building, Guest House
- Designated: 1957
- Region: National Capital Region

The Goldenberg Mansion is a historic residence built in the 1870s by the Eugsters, a Spanish merchant family. Later, it was revamped in a Moorish Revival style by Jose Moreno Lacalle, a Spanish colonial official and writer, using materials such as Philippine hardwood, pre-fabricated steel from Belgium, Italian marble, and bricks and tiles from Spain.

Named after its subsequent owner, Michael Goldenberg, an American businessman who established the Goldenberg Department Store in Escolta. Following Goldenberg's death in 1963, the property was acquired by First Lady Imelda Marcos from his heirs as one of the Marcos mansions, or residences acquired by the Marcoses using ill-gotten wealth stolen from public money. Subsequently, it became the offices of the Marcos Foundation and served as a guest house after undergoing extensive restoration by National Artist for Architecture Leandro Locsin.

Since the People Power Revolution of 1986, the mansion has been under the ownership of the Government of the Philippines but remained inaccessible to the public. In 2023, First Lady Liza Araneta Marcos oversaw renovations, and the mansion has now reopened to the public as a cultural center and events space.

== Historical background ==
=== Early history ===
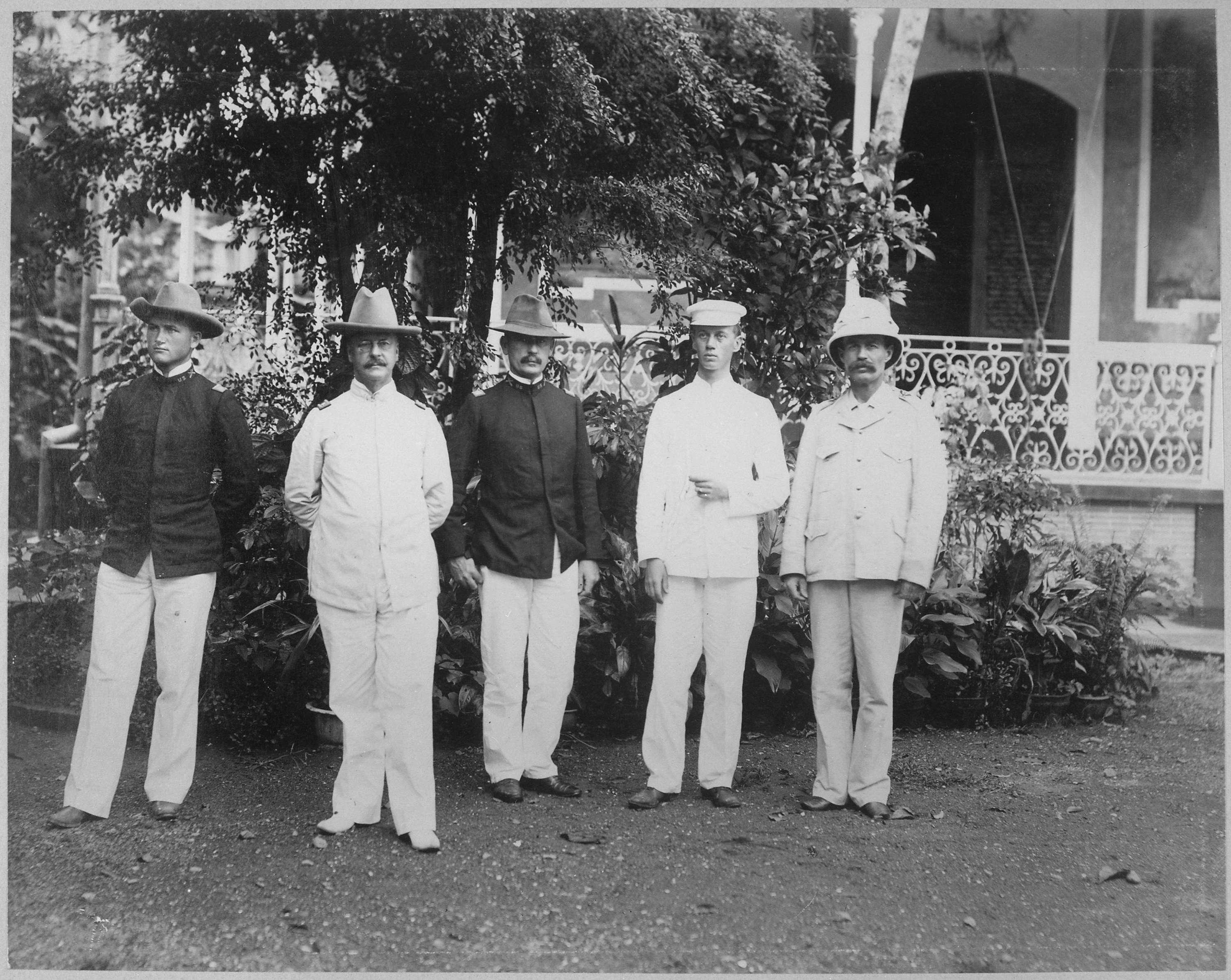
American General Arthur MacArthur Jr. and his staff on the grounds of the Goldenberg Mansion in 1898.

The Goldenberg Mansion boasts a rich historical background, dating back to its construction in the 1870s by the Spanish merchant family, the Eugsters, who owned the trading company Eugster, Labhart y Cia. It was later purchased by Jose Moreno Lacalle, a Spanish lawyer, writer, and colonial official who had previously served as the auditor of the Real Audiencia of Manila. Lacalle infused elements of his native region of Granada, heavily incorporating Moorish Revival into the design. The mansion showcases window sashes using capiz shells, an arcaded veranda, a paved courtyard, and a splashing fountain. It was constructed using indigenous materials such as Philippine hardwood, alongside European materials including pre-fabricated steel from Belgium, marble from Italy, and bricks and tiles from Spain.

Over the course of the next fifty-three years, the house underwent several changes in ownership, being leased to various government and military offices. Between 1897 and 1898, it was rented to the Spanish Navy, serving as the residence for its commanding officer, Admiral Patricio Montojo, and housing the Spanish Navy Club's headquarters. After Admiral Montojo's defeat at the Battle of Manila Bay and the surrender of Manila to the Americans under U.S. Navy Commodore George Dewey, it became the residence of battalion commander General Arthur MacArthur Jr. until his appointment as Military Governor of the Philippines in 1900. In 1901, Governor MacArthur Jr., who was responsible for maintaining public order of the city of Manila, established the Metropolitan Police Force of Manila, with himself as its inaugural chief. The police force was initially stationed on the mansion's grounds.

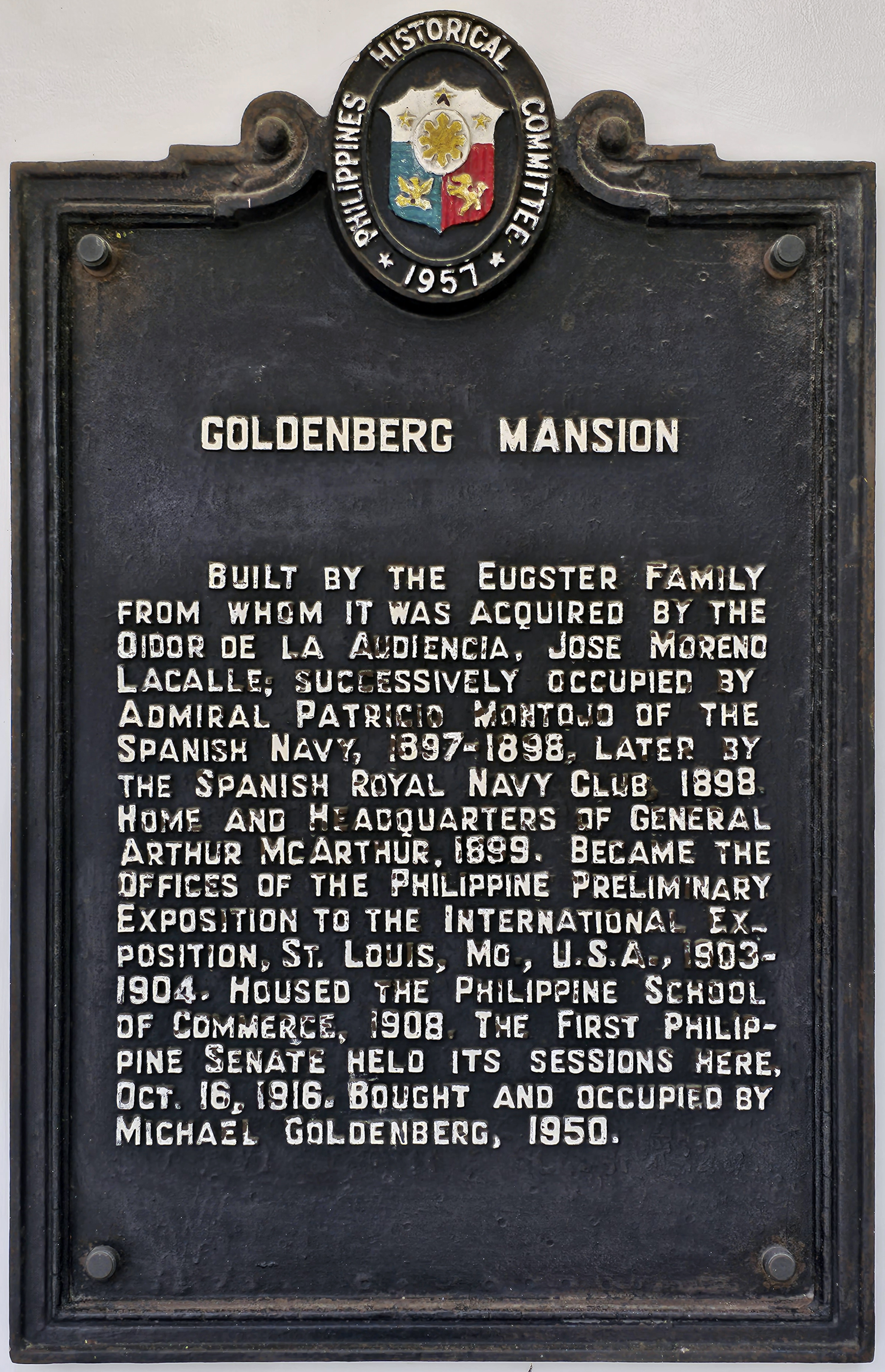
Detail of the Philippine Historical Committee marker on the mansion which was installed in 1957

Furthermore, it was the inaugural location of the Philippine School of Commerce (now the Polytechnic University of the Philippines) in 1908 and hosted the first session of the Senate of the Philippines in 1916. In 1903, it functioned as the office of the Philippine Preliminary Exposition to the International Exposition in St. Louis, exhibiting artifacts before their transfer to the Louisiana Purchase Exposition in 1904, marking the mansion's initial role as a museum.

By 1915, the property was acquired by Ricardo Esteban Barretto, whose family established the San Miguel Brewery. During World War II, it served as the residence of a Japanese general, and post-war, it was converted into a restaurant-nightclub for American troops known as the Ye Olde Mansion.

=== Michael Goldenberg and his estate: 1950-1966 ===
In 1950, the mansion was acquired by Michael Goldenberg (1889–1963), an American businessman of French-Jewish descent and philanthropist who initially arrived in the Philippines as a young boy in 1896. Goldenberg amassed his wealth in retail, founding the Goldenberg Department Store situated in Escolta and holding exclusive distribution rights in the Philippines for distributing Helene Curtis beauty products.

Goldenberg was also a keen stamp collector and a trailblazer in organised philately in the Philippines. He amassed a collection of over 4000 books, journals, maps, old photographs, pamphlets, and other ephemera on the Philippines. Subsequently, he established the Goldenberg Filipiniana Library, a private institution dedicated to the study of Philippine history and culture. Consequently, the mansion came to be known as the Goldenberg Mansion.

=== Imelda Marcos: 1966-1986 ===
In 1966, the Goldenberg Mansion was acquired by the First Lady of the Philippines, Imelda Marcos, from the heirs of Michael Goldenberg as one of the Marcos mansions, or residences acquired by the Marcos family using ill-gotten wealth stolen from public money. Subsequently, the Philippine architect Leandro Locsin was commissioned to undertake an extensive restoration and renovation of the interiors. The mansion was later renamed Ang Maharlika and served as the office and guest house of the Marcos Foundation.

In addition to the Goldenberg Mansion's library, the mansion showcased Imelda Marcos's extensive art collection. It housed a significant collection of oriental ceramics and artefacts, including Chinese jade furniture, excavated porcelain and pottery, and Ban Chiang pottery from Thailand.

The living room featured wood filigree arches and chandeliers. Its interiors showcased tapestries depicting Diana the Huntress and a "Della Robbia" style mirror, once belonging to Catherine de Medici, while Persian rugs adorned the floors. Several paintings by the American artist Grandma Moses and a 16th-century European devotional altar adorned with ivory figures depicting the life and martyrdom of Catherine of Alexandria.

After the fall of the Marcos dictatorship in 1986, ownership of the Goldenberg Mansion and other properties within the Malacañang Palace complex transferred to the Philippine Government, with restricted public access. In 2019, the Sandiganbayan forfeited the collection of Grandma Moses paintings that were found at the Goldenberg Mansion in favour of the Government.

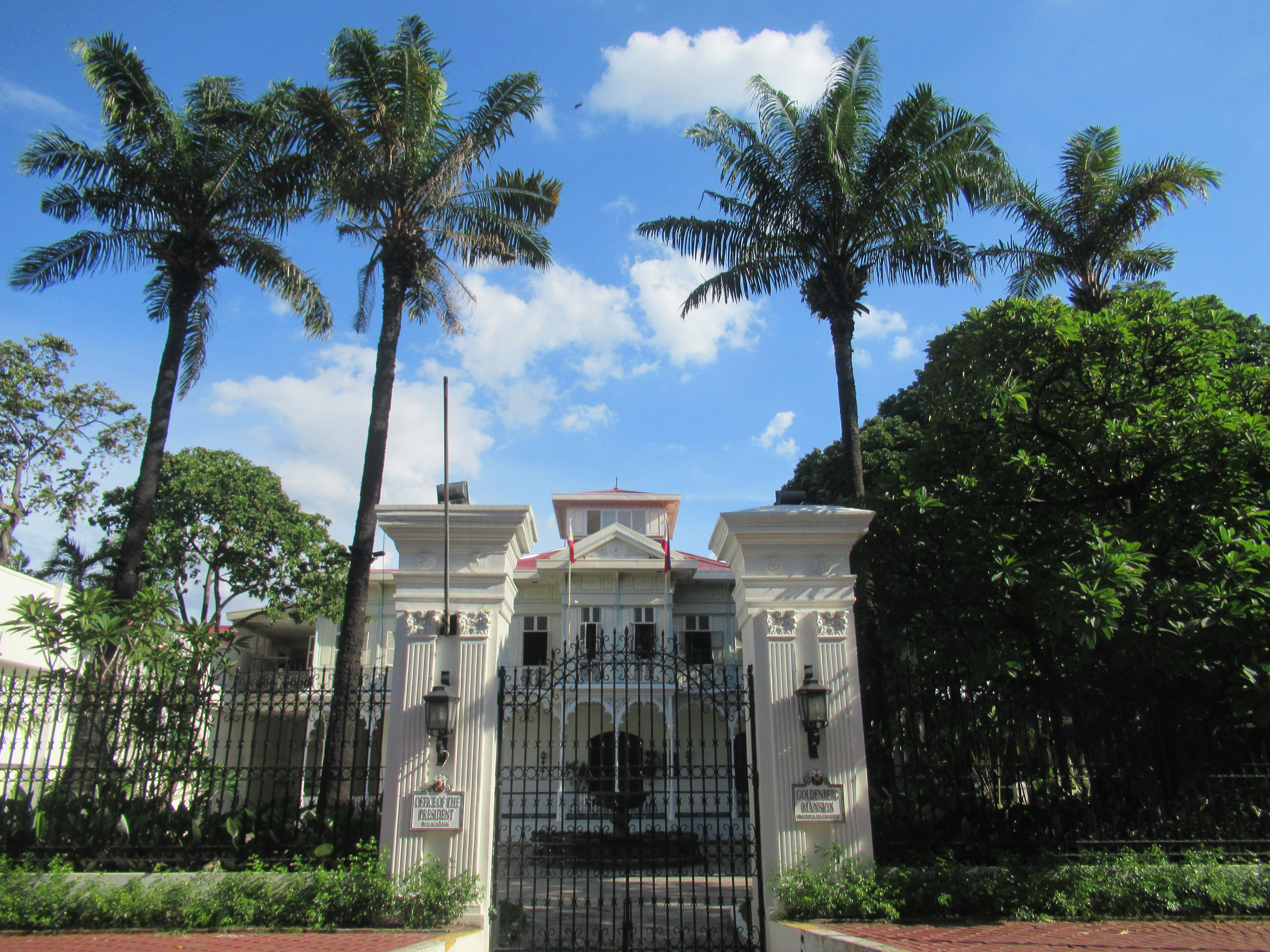
Gates

== Reopened as the Goldenberg Mansion Cultural Center ==
On May 12, 2023, President Bongbong Marcos issued Executive Order No. 26 to conserve and protect cultural heritage sites around Malacañang Palace, including the Teus Mansion and the Goldenberg Mansion. The supervision of these properties was transferred to the Social Secretary's Office from the former Office of the Deputy Executive Secretary for General Administration.

Following the initiative of First Lady Liza Araneta Marcos, the Goldenberg Mansion underwent renovation to be made into a cultural center and events space from 2022 to 2023. In addition, a glass house was added on the grounds of the Goldenberg Mansion which was designed and conceptualized by interior designer Jonathan G. Matti.

=== Goldenberg: The Concert Series ===
The Goldenberg Concert Series is part of the "Konsyerto sa Palasyo" launched in April 2023. In March 2024, Araneta Marcos' inaugural concert starred Manila Symphony Orchestra musicians. The Series featured exceptional Filipino performing artists especially the youth. It is the brainchild of Stella Goldenberg Brimo, daughter of Michael Goldenberg. In April 2024, Indak ng Musika, a piano concert was performed by alumni of Santa Isabel College’s Conservatory of Music. In the fourth event violinist Adrian Ong and pianist Jet Chong performed for former First Lady Imelda Marcos, and her sister-in-law Irene Araneta.
