= Operation Big Bird =

Attempt by the Philippine government to recover stolen money

"Operation Big Bird" (Filipino: Oplan Big Bird) was the attempt of the Philippine Government during the presidency of Corazon Aquino to recover an alleged US$7.5 billion of hidden accounts and assets of President Ferdinand Marcos and his family in Swiss banks. Conceived by Philippine banker Michael de Guzman, it commenced shortly after Marcos was forced into exile in the United States. Initially, Operation Big Bird did not recover any money, with two differing reports by Representative Victorio Chaves and Senator Jovito Salonga. Chaves laid the blame upon Salonga, Solicitor-General Sedfrey Ordoñez and the Swiss bank lawyers. Salonga countered that Ordoñez had prevented the Philippine government from losing a large sum of money. Evidence suggests that de Guzman acted in good faith on behalf of the new government but that a double cross may have been involved.

== Background ==
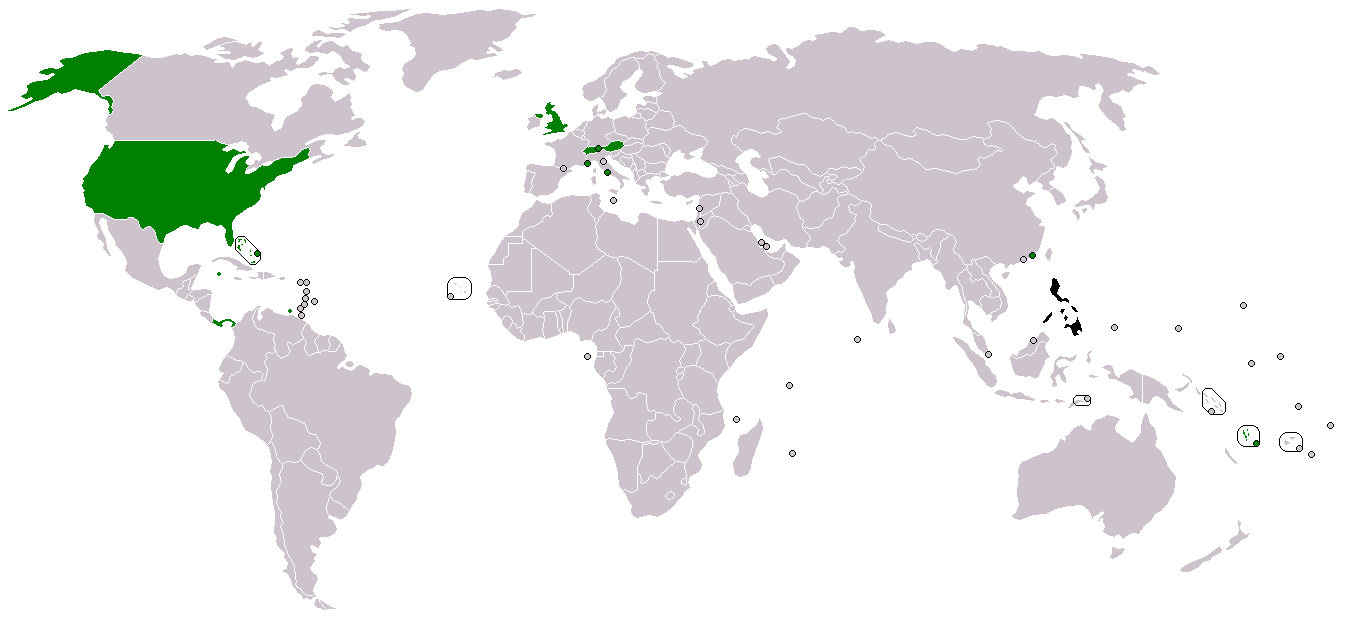
Operation Big Bird theater.

After Ferdinand Marcos and his family were sent to exile in Hawaii, President Aquino's Executive Order No. 1 on February 28, 1986, created the Presidential Commission on Good Government (PCGG). The mandate of the PCGG was to recover all the ill-gotten wealth of Ferdinand Marcos, his family, relatives, associates, and cronies. Salonga was called to head the PCGG.

Operation Big Bird began when Filipino banker and Chairman of Credit Manila, de Guzman, contacted the Aquino administration and offered his services to recover the Marcos' wealth in the various banks in Switzerland and other countries. De Guzman then was put in touch with Brigadier General Jose T. Almonte and Charlie Avila.

The banks, financial institutions and other companies that dealt with the Marcos wealth and assets were held in various countries, namely:

- Switzerland
- Liechtenstein (for foundations)
- Austria
- Cayman Islands
- Vanuatu (formerly New Hebrides)
- United Kingdom
- Hong Kong
- United States
- Panama (for trust companies and real estates)
- Monaco
- Bahamas
- Vatican City
- Netherlands Antilles (for real estates in New York City)

== Events of Operation Big Bird ==
=== Pre-EDSA Revolution ===
On March 21, 1968, Marcos opened his first bank account in Chase Manhattan Bank in New York City and deposited US$215,000.00. In March 1968, an official of Credit Suisse in Zurich, Walter Fessler, was brought to Manila on the request of Malacañang. Forms were filled out and signatures appended. Marcos, on his signature verification form, wrote "William Saunders," an alias he had used in his World War II days, and underneath that name he wrote his real name. Imelda Marcos did the same, choosing "Jane Ryan" as her pseudonym. Four bank accounts were opened and four checks, totaling US$950,000.00 were deposited. In 1982 Credit Manila established its operations in Vienna with the incorporation of Exportfinanzierungsbank GmbH. In 1985 Mike De Guzman made acquaintance with Victor Bou Dagher, a Lebanese national residing in Austria who had some connections and acquaintances in the European banking network. De Guzman later introduced Dagher to Gen. Almonte in Manila in view of the news of Marcos hiding and moving their wealth in Swiss banks. The group outlined their plans to capture Marcos' money. On February 25, 1986, the People Power Revolution brought about the downfall of Pres. Ferdinand Marcos. Marcos, his family, and retinue were taken by U.S. Air Force helicopters from the PSG Compound across the Pasig River from Malacañan Palace, and were brought to Clark Air Base. The next day they were flown to Guam.

=== Post-EDSA events and the Lebanese connection ===
On February 26, 1986, the Marcos party arrived in Honolulu, Hawaii, beginning their exile. U.S. Customs officers spent five hours going over the 278 crates that the group had brought with them. Twenty-two crates contained more than Php27.7 million in newly minted currency, mostly hundred-peso denominations worth approximately US$1,270,000.00 There were other certificates of deposit from Philippine banks worth about US$1 million, five handguns, 154 videotapes, seventeen cassette tapes, and 2,068 pages of documents - all of which were impounded by Customs. The Marcos party was allowed to keep only US$300,000.00 in gold and $150,000.00 in bearer bonds that they brought in with their personal luggage, because they declared them and broke no US customs laws. There were 24 one-kilo gold bars fitted into a $17,000 hand-tooled Gucci briefcase with a solid gold buckle and a plaque on it that read, "To Ferdinand Marcos, from Imelda, on the Occasion of our 24th Wedding Anniversary." On March 1, 1986, De Guzman returned to Vienna and met with Dagher who updated him on the various reactions within the Swiss banking community regarding the recent developments in Manila. De Guzman began to take action on how to transfer the money from the Swiss Banks to Austria. On March 2, 1986, De Guzman and Dagher flew to Lebanon via Cyprus to meet with some contacts in the European banking industry -- Beirut being the banking capital of the Mediterranean basin. After arriving in Jounieh, De Guzman and Dagher met with fellow bankers who informed them how Iran was able to recover the frozen assets of Shāh Mohammad-Rezā Pahlavi, in Switzerland. De Guzman was told by the contacts that the Swiss banks would be moving the Marcos money to various financial institutions to safeguard the deposits and avoid a massive withdrawal, which the bankers alleged was a practice of the Swiss banking system. This resulted in the suggestion that De Guzman should go to Hawaii and meet with the Marcoses to get power of attorney to withdraw the money on their behalf before the banks closed-in on the accounts. De Guzman claimed he had no intimate association with the Marcoses, but that his only contact would be Col. Irwin Ver, former Commanding Officer of the Presidential Security Group, and son of General Fabian Ver. It was then that De Guzman and his associates started calling the plan "Operation Big Bird." On March 12, 1986, President Aquino passes Executive Order No. 2, freezing all Marcos assets in the Philippines.

=== The power of attorney from the Marcoses ===
On March 18, 1986, De Guzman and Dagher arrived in Honolulu and met Col. Ver and Gen. Ver. On March 20, 1986, De Guzman received a call from Irwin Ver who confirmed that a meeting had been arranged with the Marcoses - Ferdinand, Imelda and Bongbong - at their temporary lodging in base housing inside Hickam AFB. At the meeting De Guzman shared the news that the Swiss banks would make a move on their account. Marcos wanted to confirm this information and sent Bongbong and De Guzman at around 10:00 pm to Honolulu International Airport to call their personal banker in Credit Suisse, Ernst Scheller. The off-base call was made to avoid possible wire taps or listening devices. Upon their return to base housing, the Marcoses hold a family meeting where Bongbong updated the family through a teleconference. An hour later, Bongbong left with De Guzman for the airport once more, but this time the telephone operator refused to give Bongbong the international connection. They returned to base housing where De Guzman received a note from Imelda stating "Palmy Foundation" and a plastic bag containing traveler's cheques worth US$300,000.00. Imelda produced a Power of Attorney and tasked Bongbong with handing this to De Guzman back at the hotel. Bongbong informed De Guzman Ernst Scheller at Credit Suisse, and told him to get in touch with Scheller once they entered Switzerland.

=== Initial attempt in Switzerland ===
On March 24, 1986, De Guzman flew with Dagher to Zurich to meet with Scheller and present the Power of Attorney to transfer the Marcos money to the Exportfinanzierungsbank in Vienna. They were initially informed by Scheller that the Swiss authorities have put a "freeze order" on all the accounts linked to the Marcoses, but failed to produce any formal documentation on this. Scheller also mentioned that he re-documented the records already and moved the accounts as instructed by Ms. Fe Gimenez, Marcos' personal secretary, three weeks before after their evacuation of Malacañan Palace. Without the formal notice of the freeze order, De Guzman suspects Scheller of stalling the transfer in protection of the interest of Credit Suisse and not the Marcoses. After the meeting, Scheller calls on the Swiss Federal Banking Commission that De Guzman was trying to transfer US$213 Million to Vienna. That very same evening the Banking Commission, in an unprecedented move, imposed an emergency freeze order on all the accounts of the Marcoses. This act was questioned later since the Banking Commission does not have the authority to freeze bank accounts. The Swiss Federal Council taking note of the confusion created by the Banking Commission's "freeze order" made a follow through act, and formalized the freeze order in anticipation of the new Philippine government's claim on the said accounts. The Aquino government welcomed the freeze order, and the PCGG hired three prominent Swiss lawyers Messr. Sergio Salvioni, Guy Fontanet, and Moritz Leuenberger, to handle its case. The said lawyers were recommended by Chief Justice of the Federal Supreme Court Otto Konstantin Kaufmann, who was the classmate of Salonga in Yale University. On April 18, 1986, the Philippine government submitted an informal request to the Swiss authorities for mutual assistance in the recovery of the Marcos wealth. On April 25, 1986, the Government of the Philippines submitted a follow-through formal request for mutual assistance to investigate and retrieve the ill-gotten wealth. The Swiss Federal Office of Police then issued a freeze order in substitution for the exceptional freezing order of the Federal Council.

=== Operation Big Bird under the Philippine government ===
On May 7, 1986, Mike de Guzman attempted once more to retrieve the Marcos money in the Swiss accounts, by making Scheller acknowledge their personal meeting and the Power of Attorney. Scheller replied by telex from Credit Suisse, but informed De Guzman that the freeze order was still in place. De Guzman finally called Gen. Almonte and updated him of his recent activities. Almonte, for his part, informed De Guzman that there were some parties in the new government who had serious doubts about him, as he had a reputation for being an associate of Eduardo Cojuangco Jr., a Marcos crony. This prompted De Guzman to head to Manila to present his plans for Operation Big Bird to the new Philippine Government. On June 16, 1986, in Manila, Gen. Almonte arranged a meeting between De Guzman and the brother of Pres. Aquino, Congressman Jose Cojuangco Jr. (Tarlac, 1st District). De Guzman offered to help the Aquino government retrieve the Marcos wealth in return for a 20% commission on the initial tranche of funds. De Guzman asserted that they had identified accounts in Credit Suisse amounting to US$213 million, and eleven foundations that held a total of US$4.5 billion in deposits in nine different banks, with an additional US$3 billion in precious metals and securities on deposit -- a tentative total of US$7.5 billion. And most importantly, they had the Power of Attorney from the Marcoses. Cojuangco instructed Dr. Fernando Carrascoso, who was present at the meeting, to arrange for De Guzman's introduction to PCCG Chairman Jovito Salonga. On June 18, 1986, Dr. Carrascoso informed De Guzman that Chairman Salonga was not available, and thus he was instead referred to Commissioner Raul Daza. The meeting was also attended by Mayor Charlie Avila. De Guzman briefed the other men on the plans of Operation Big Bird. Daza committed that he would get approval from Salonga. On June 26, 1986, De Guzman, Dagher and Almonte flew to Bern where the group, through the arrangements made by Amb. Ascalon, met with PCCG lawyer Dr. Salvioni, who advised them that any request made by the Philippine Government must be signed by the Solicitor-General of the Philippines. On July 1, 1986, After conferring with his older brother, Congressman Cojuangco presented the options to President Aquino and a meeting was arranged for General Almonte and De Guzman to orient the President on Operation Big Bird. Aquino approved the plan, and Operation Big Bird finally commenced with De Guzman and Almonte being joined by Solicitor-General Sedfrey Ordoñez. De Guzman makes Ordoñez and Almonte members of the Board of Exportfinanzierungsbank, along with Almonte's former mentor and former Marcos Executive Secretary, Amb. Alejandro Melchor Jr.

=== Second attempt with the Philippine Government ===
On July 4, 1986, De Guzman, Almonte and Ordoñez arrived in Bern, and were met by Ascalon. Ascalon informed the new Philippine government's recovery team that the three Swiss lawyers of the PCGG and a man by the name of Pieter Hoets were waiting at the Philippine Embassy. Upon arrival at the Embassy, Hoets and the lawyers insisted that the scheduled meeting with the Swiss bankers should only be attended by Ordoñez, and that De Guzman and Almonte should not be included. Almonte defended his group's attending and restated that they had all been appointed by the President to work as a team on Operation Big Bird. A long argument ensued between the Swiss lawyers and the Philippine representatives. A meeting with the Federal Department of Justice and Police only took 20 minutes, when the Swiss authorities unanimously decided to approve in principle the selective defreezing of only those identified Marcos accounts and foundations, amounting to US$213 million. The Swiss authorities advised the Philippine representatives to formalize the request, and told them to finish this before the day's end. Upon returning to the Philippine Embassy the group called Chairman Salonga and Congressman Cojuangco on the success of the Operation, and rushed to complete the required formal documents. Dr. Salvioni questioned the urgency of the Filipino team, but was ignored and Ordoñez signed the request accordingly. The letter arrived at the FDJP with 15 minutes to spare before the 6:00 pm deadline. FDJP was to act on the request and by Monday, July 7, have the Zurich Court execute a transfer instruction to the Swiss banks. On July 6, 1986, De Guzman received additional information on the newly identified Marcos accounts in Switzerland amounting to US$3 billion in six different banks. The breakdown of the deposits were US$700 million in money placements, US$1.3 billion in securities and bonds, and US$1 billion in Gold certificates. It was suggested that the team should prepare the same request as those of July 4, and that Almonte should fly to Switzerland first thing the next day to endorse the documents to Ambassador Ascalon for a formal communication to the FDJP. On July 7, 1986, Almonte flew alone to Zurich at 6:00am with the signed documents, but Ascalon refused to affix the official communication of the Embassy without the approval of Dr. Salvioni. De Guzman, who was in Vienna, frantically tried to track down Dr. Salvioni, but to no avail. Almonte returned to Vienna that night and briefly updated Ordoñez on what has transpired in Bern. Ordoñez postponed the meeting until the next day. The FDJP meanwhile acted on the request and lifted the freeze order on the US$213 Million identified by the Philippine representatives.

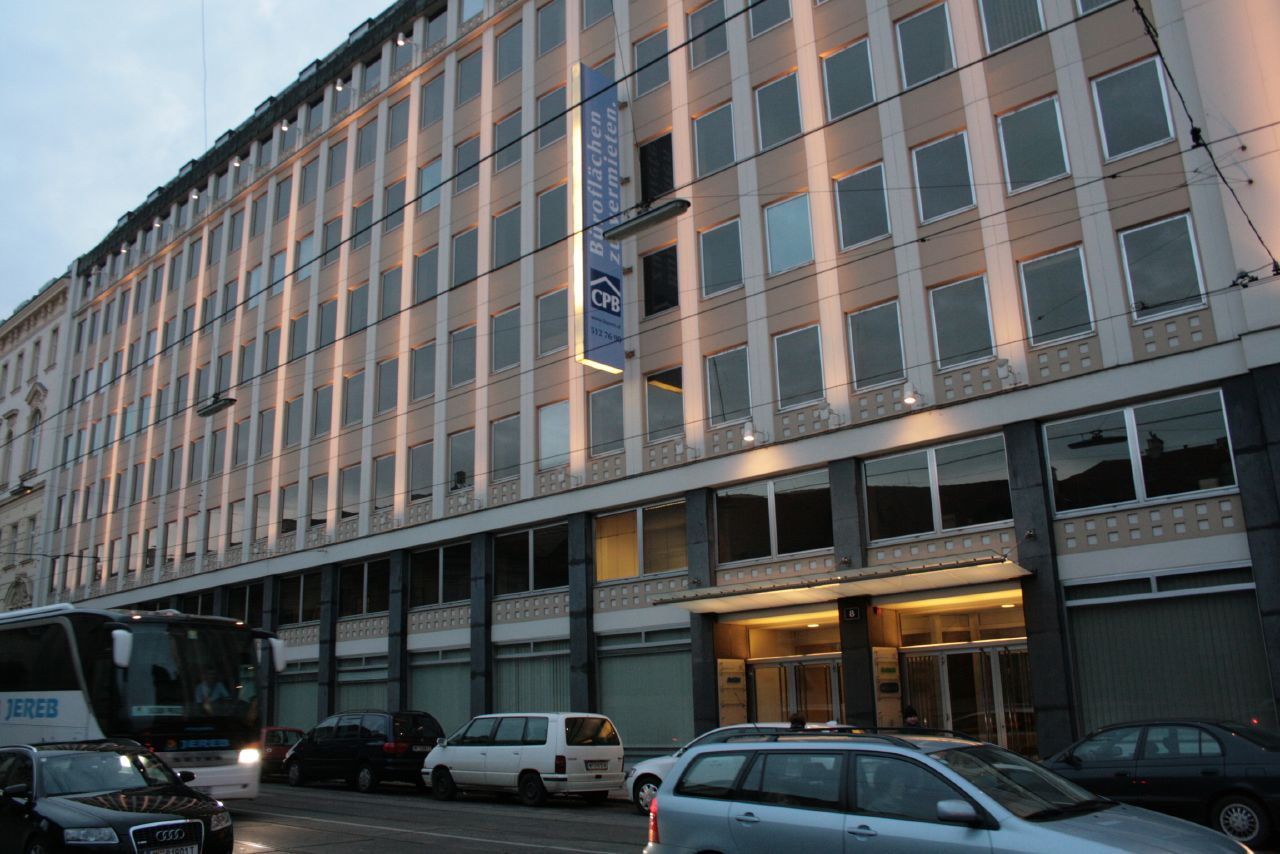
The former office of the Exportfinanzierungsbank along Prinz Eugen Strasse in Vienna.

On July 8, 1986, The Judge of Instructions in Zurich ordered Credit Suisse to release and transfer the unfrozen Marcos deposits to the account of the Philippine Government in Exportfinanzierungsbank in Vienna. Ordoñez, however, made a turn-around in fear of the money being diverted from Vienna to a Marcos-favored destination. The Swiss lawyers hired by the PCGG tipped Ordoñez on the credibility of De Guzman and his bank in Vienna. Ordoñez instructed the Swiss lawyers, without informing Almonte and De Guzman, to request the FDJP and Credit Suisse to direct the transfer of the monies to a new destination, the newly opened account of the Philippine Government within the said bank. Ordoñez secretly left Vienna for Zurich, then to Manila on the orders of PCGG Chairman Salonga. Almonte and De Guzman were left in Vienna without an idea as to what happened to the Solicitor-General, and frantically searched Vienna for the Philippine official, until confirming on July 10 that Ordoñez was already in Manila. Meanwhile, before the transfer was made, the Credit Suisse official, Ernst Scheller, contacted the son of the former president, Bongbong Marcos, and informed him of the Philippine Government's actions. This gave Ferdinand Marcos notice to execute a revocation of his Power of Attorney to De Guzman. On July 11, 1986, De Guzman and Almonte returned to Manila to debrief Congressman Cojuangco on the events that took place in Bern and Vienna. Marcos' revocation of the Power of Attorney was sent by facsimile to his Swiss lawyer, Bruno de Preux of the law firm Tavernier, Gillioz, de Preux, Dorsaz in Geneva. On July 13, 1986, The Philippine Daily Inquirer quoted Ordoñez that they were able to retrieve the initial US$213 million of Marcos' plundered money in Switzerland, and that the said fund would be in the government's hands soon. Marcos' Swiss lawyers submitted copies of the revocation to the Swiss authorities. On July 20, 1986, The FDJP rescinded the unfreezing order reference to the Revocation Letter received from Marcos on the Power of Attorney given to De Guzman.

== Aftermath ==
Almonte received a call from Malacañang on December 24, 1986, and was called for a meeting with the President to debrief her on what actually happened in Switzerland and Austria. The meeting was confirmed by Ms. Ching Escaler, Aquino's Appointments Secretary (and later Philippine Ambassador and Permanent Representative to the UN in Geneva and New York City) on December 29, 1986. Almonte arrived with De Guzman in Malacañang, and was met first by Executive Secretary Joker Arroyo who stalled the two, along with Justice Secretary Ordoñez, from meeting the President.

Meanwhile, on October 21, 1988, a US federal grand jury in New York indicted Ferdinand and Imelda Marcos for a US$268 million racketeering scheme, siphoning the Philippine Treasury of US$103 million, and defrauding US banks of US$165 million. By November 3, Imelda returned to Hawaii after Doris Duke posted a US$5 million bail.

The Philippine Government thus lost its chance to recover the money in the Marcos Swiss accounts through Operation Big Bird. The whole fiasco was then brought into light by the Philippine House of Representatives' Committee on Public Accountability in mid-1989, under the Chairmanship of Cong. Victorico "Concoy" Chaves (2nd District, Misamis Oriental).

The Chaves Report suggested that the Philippine Government would have immediately recovered the $213 million in July 1986 from Credit Suisse and its affiliates had the operation not been stopped by PCGG Chairman Salonga and Solicitor-General Ordoñez, and that this would have "paved the way to the recovery of the other deposits of the Marcoses with the Swiss banks" which was estimated by the Chaves Report to be at least $3 billion.

However, De Guzman and Gen. Almonte lay the blame on Executive Secretary Joker Arroyo, and Philippine Ambassador to Bern, Luis Ascalon, aside from Ordoñez and Salonga. Jovito Salonga, who by 1989 was already the Senate President, and Ordoñez who became Justice Secretary, have fully denied these accusations.

The Chaves Report also rejected the view of the Swiss attorneys and PCGG Chairman Jovito R. Salonga that they had saved the Philippine Government from a massive theft. It concluded that if the funds had been remitted to the Vienna bank to the account of Philippine government, whose authorized joint signatories were Solicitor-General Ordoñez and Gen. Almonte, there was no risk that De Guzman would have stolen the money. In addition to this the Exportfinanzierungsbank in Vienna was also strictly regulated by the Austrian Federal Market Authority (FMA), and that the bank's board even had Almonte, Ordoñez, and Amb. Alejandro Melchor - ensuring the Philippine government's interest in the bank protected. And finally, De Guzman expected to receive a commission of $40 million (i.e. a 20% commission on the $213 million) if the monies were recovered, and thus had an interest in ensuring that recovery took place.

On December 20, 1990, the Federal Supreme Court of Switzerland decided that the US$213 Million along with other banking documents should be transferred to the Philippine government, with conditions however.

On August 10, 1995, the PCGG filed an additional request with the District Attorney in Zurich for the immediate transfer of the deposits to an escrow account in the Philippine National Bank (PNB). The request was granted. On appeal by the Marcoses, the Swiss Federal Supreme Court, in a decision dated December 10, 1997, upheld the ruling of the District Attorney of Zurich granting the request for the transfer of the funds. In 1998, the funds were remitted to the Philippines in escrow.

On December 10, 1997, under the Swiss Federal Act of International Mutual Assistance in Criminal Matters (IMAC), the Swiss Federal Supreme Court, issued the final decision to transfer the fund to the Sandiganbayan which by then had grown to US$540 Million due to interest.

Also in 1997 the Philippine Senate's Blue Ribbon Committee and the House of Representatives' Committee on Good Government, again reviewed the saga of Operation Big Bird, with the same conclusion. Aquino's Vice President, Salvador Laurel would reflect that this was their administration's greatest failure.

Starting in April 1998, and up to July of that year, the Swiss authorities began transferring the identified Marcos money in Swiss banks to an escrow account in the PNB.

On July 29, 1999, Sandiganbayan Presiding Justice Francis E. Garchitorena denied the motion to release US$150 million from the funds to pay Marcos human rights victims.

On October 27, 1999, the Senate Blue Ribbon Committee held a special hearing in the Philippine Consulate in Honolulu. In the hearing, businessman Enrique Zobel testified that in early 1989, he met with Marcos who asked for a US$250 million loan from him. Zobel refused unless Marcos could provide collateral. Marcos later produced documents of a Vatican trust in gold accounts to pay off the loan.

On February 4, 2004, the retrieved Marcos money which by then had grown to US$683 million, was finally transferred by PNB to the Bureau of the Treasury.

According to the Agrarian Reform Law, part of the retrieved Marcos wealth was to be utilized for the government's agrarian reform program, and the remaining part for the compensation of the victims of the Marcos dictatorship. Once all pending legalities were settled regarding the US$683 Million in escrow, the fund was finally transferred to the Department of Agrarian Reform and Department of Agriculture.

However, in 2005 the Philippine Center for Investigative Journalism (PCIJ) reported that a portion of the money was diverted by the Arroyo administration for the President's campaign during the 2004 elections. This led to Senate Blue Ribbon Committee inquiry concluding that Pres. Arroyo mismanaged the fund, which then became known as the Fertilizer Fund scam.

== See also ==
- Unexplained wealth of the Marcos family
- Marcos mansions
- Overseas landholdings of the Marcos family
- Marcos jewels
- Fertilizer Fund Scam
- Bank secrecy
- World Jewish Congress lawsuit against Swiss banks
