= Marcos Twin Mansion =

Abandoned mansion in Cabuyao, Laguna, Philippines

Cabuyao Mansion
- "Marcos Twin Mansion"
- Interactive map of Cabuyao Mansion
- Type: Mansion Monument
- Location: Brgy. Casile, Cabuyao, Laguna, Philippines
- Coordinates: 14°12′12″N 121°2′31″E
- Created: 1979 complete
- Operator: Presidential Commission on Good Government
- Status: Finish

Cabuyao Mansion (formerly the Marcos Twin Mansion) is a government-owned mansion located at Brgy. Casile, Cabuyao. The mansion was built in the 1980s during the administration of the former Philippine president Ferdinand Marcos. It was then sequestered in 1987 as part of the ill-gotten properties that were acquired by the Marcos family. In 2010, the Sandiganbayan ordered the return of the property to the Marcos Family. However, in 2017 the Supreme Court of the Philippines released a hold order on this, and the property is still currently under control of the Presidential Commission on Good Government.

The mansion is located west of Canlubang Golf & Country Club and north of Matang Tubig and northeast of People's Park in the Sky, It is located near neighboring cities and towns of Biñan, Sta. Rosa, Calamba, Silang, Cavite and Carmona, Cavite. In recent years, it has been the site of filming for several local horror and historical films and is often visited by cyclists who are traversing the Tagaytay-Calamba Road, or popularly known as "RevPal".

== See also ==
- Ferdinand Marcos
- Casile, Cabuyao
- Matang Tubig
- Canlubang Golf & Country Club
- Marcos mansions
- Unexplained wealth of the Marcos family
- Haunted Mansion (2015 film)
