= Marcos mansions =

Upscale residences owned by the Ferdinand Marcos family

The term "Marcos mansions" refers to at least 50 upscale residences in the Philippines of the family of 10th President Ferdinand Marcos. These are aside from the various overseas landholdings of the Marcos family, which are spread around the world. The Supreme Court of the Philippines considers these landholdings as part of "the ill-gotten wealth" of the Marcos family, based on the definitions set forth in Republic Act No. 1379, which had been passed in 1955.

== Background ==
The Supreme Court's interpretation of R.A. 1379 says that property acquired by a public officer or employee which is "manifestly out of proportion to his salary as such public officer and to his other lawful income" is "presumed prima facie to have been unlawfully acquired." The bulk of the assets of the Marcoses, including the Marcos jewels, were treated as "ill gotten" in a 2012 decision which specified that "according to the Official Report of the Minister of Budget, the total salaries of former President Marcos as President from 1966 to 1976 was ₱60,000 a year and from 1977 to 1985, ₱100,000 a year; while that of the former First Lady, Imelda R. Marcos, as Minister of Human Settlements from June 1976 to February 22–25, 1986, was ₱75,000 a year" – about $304,372. The PCGG in its reports would state that the lawful tax declared income of the Marcos couple only amounted from 1960 to 1984 would only amount to PhP 8,148,289.42.

Along with the Marcos jewels, their overseas landholdings, art collection, and Imelda Marcos's shoe hoard, the Marcos mansions are frequently cited to illustrate the Marcos family's wanton spending during the dictatorship. Because the estimated cost of these mansions is much more than the income recorded in Marcos’ sworn statement of assets and liabilities (SALN), the number, size, and opulence of these mansions is interpreted by the Philippine government as prima facie evidence that the Marcoses plundered the Philippine economy.

Some of these properties are titled in the name of Marcos family members, but others are titled in the name of identified “Marcos cronies,” but reserved for the use of the Marcos family. In some cases, several such mansions were located close together, with specific mansions meant for individual members of the family, as was the case of the Marcos mansions on Outlook Drive in Baguio. Many of the Marcos mansions were sequestered by the Philippine government when the Marcoses were expelled from the country as a result of the 1986 EDSA Revolution.

In 2009, Imelda Marcos filed graft charges against PCGG for "illegally confiscating" their family's assets. In question were more than 197 individual certificate of titles within the country, totaling 17,405,984 sq. meters.

== Locations ==
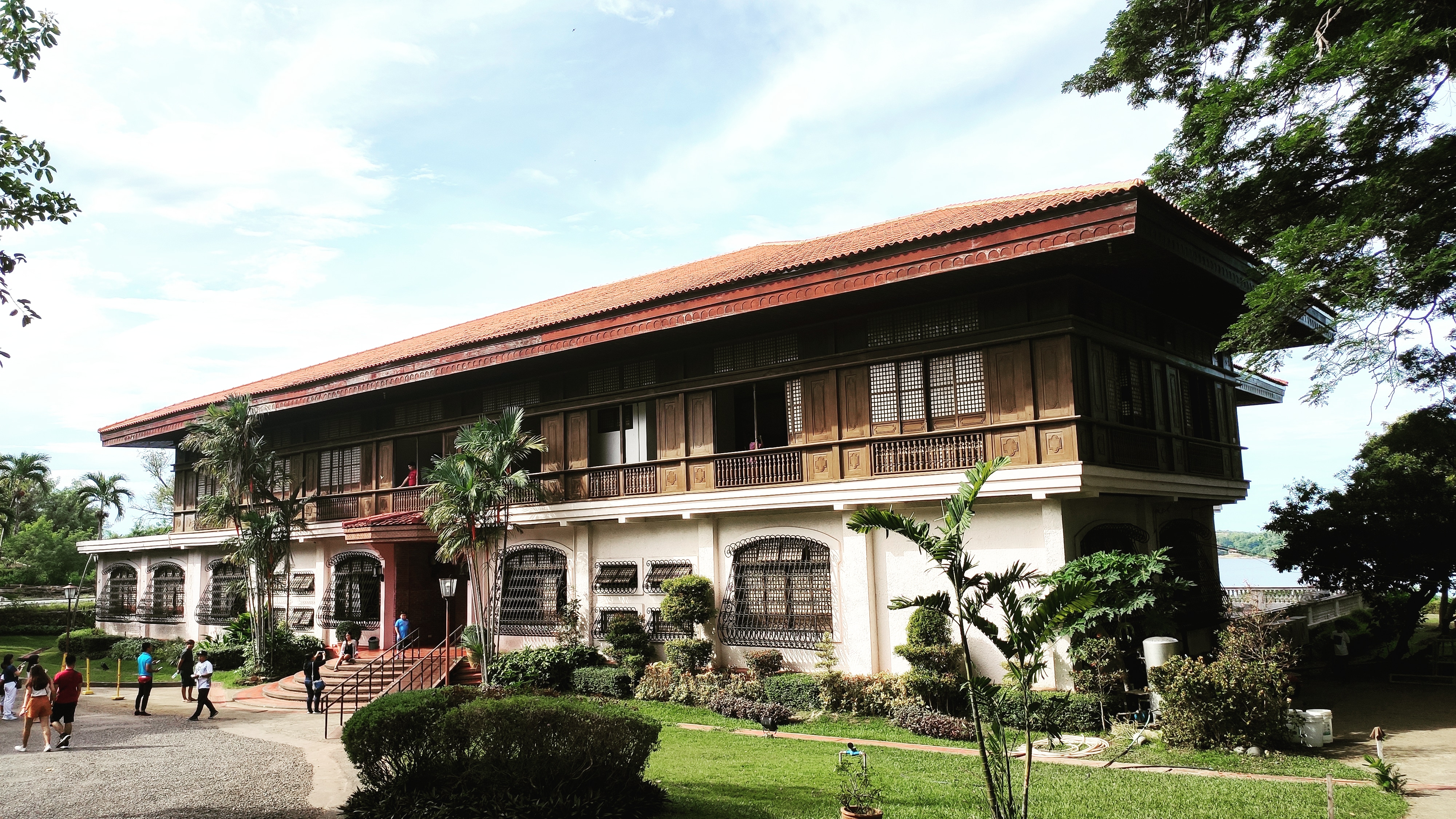
The Malacañang of the North

Locations of houses considered "Marcos mansions" include properties in Baguio, in the Ilocos region where the Marcoses trace their ancestry, Leyte where Imelda Marcos's family came from, and throughout the Greater Manila Area and its outskirts.

=== Baguio properties ===
Among roughly 50 Marcos mansions scattered throughout the Philippines, the nine properties located in Baguio are among the most commonly covered by media reports, because of their reported opulence and because of their closeness to each other and to major tourist attractions: including Mines View Park, Wright Park, and the Baguio mansion house which was constructed in the early 1900s to be the summer residence of the Philippine head of state. Four of these houses occupy roughly 5 hectares of land on Outlook Drive, just across from the mansion, and were each designated for a member of the Marcos family; the "Wigwam house compound" for Bongbong Marcos, the "Fairmont house compound for Imee Marcos, the "Hans Menzi house compound" for Irene Marcos, and a fourth house for Ferdinand Marcos's mother, Doña Josefa Edralin Marcos.

Located on the same road is a two-story house called the "Lualhati residence", whose title was held by Marcos crony, Jose Y. Campos, on behalf of the Marcoses. Another property, the Banaue Inn compound, is located just behind the Campos house.

=== Metro Manila properties ===
Closer to the main seat of power, Marcos mansions were located in Makati, Parañaque, Manila, and San Juan. Properties already built and acquired from previous owners include the Teus Mansion and the Goldenberg Mansion. Houses were also once again designated for each of the three Marcos children: a residence in Seaside subdivision, Parañaque was designated for Bongbong Marcos, one in Wack-Wack, Mandaluyong was designated for Imee Marcos, while a house in Forbes Park, Makati, was designated for Irene Marcos.

=== Ilocos Properties ===
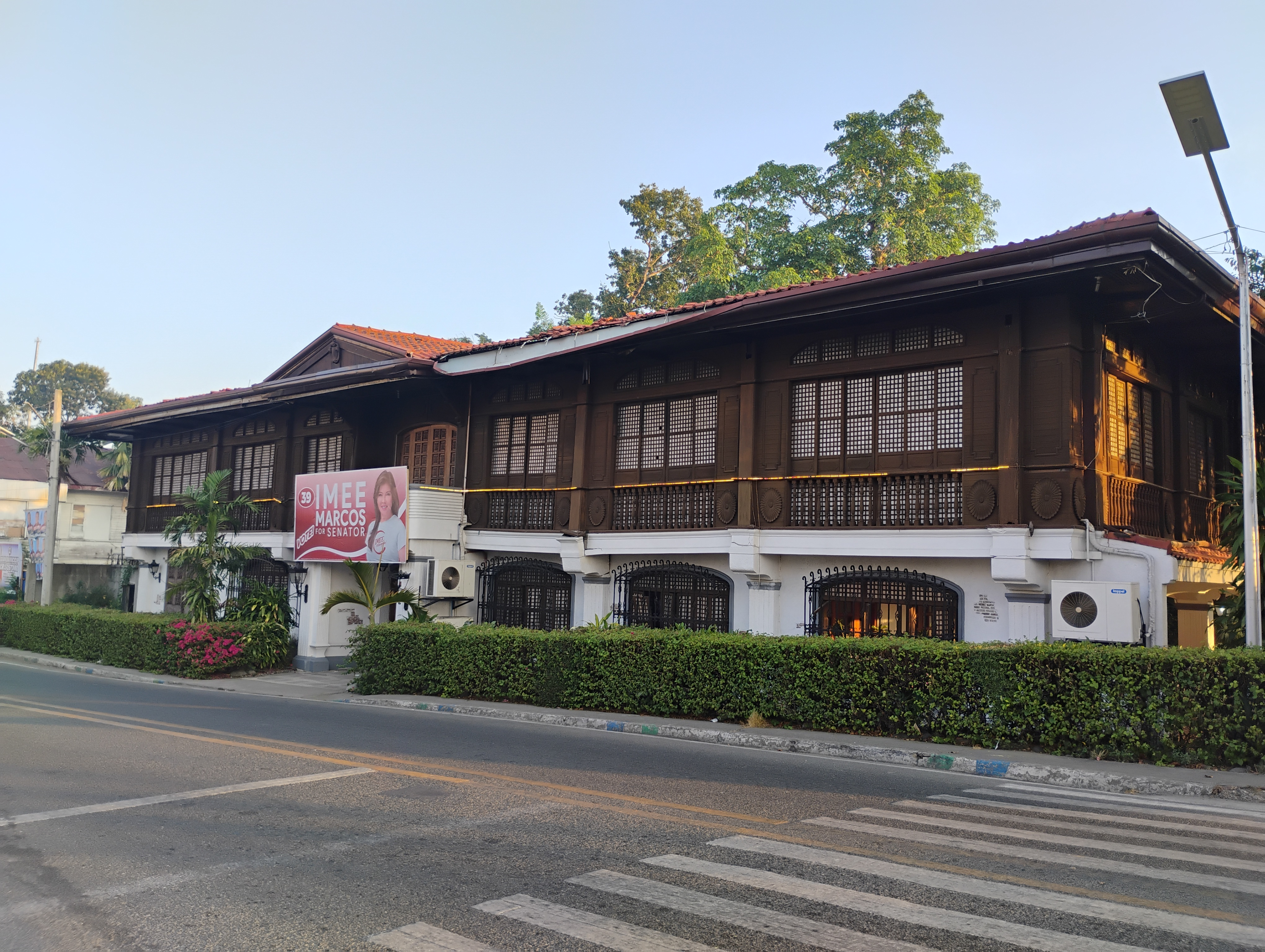
Ferdinand E. Marcos Presidential Museum in Batac, Ilocos Norte

The Ferdinand E. Marcos Presidential Center in Batac, Ilocos Norte, was the ancestral house of the Marcos family. It has served as the mausoleum of Marcos until his burial at the Libingan ng mga Bayani in Taguig, Metro Manila.

Particularly notable as well is the Malacañang of the North mansion in Paoay, Ilocos Norte, which was built by the Philippine Tourism Authority (PTA) in 1977, in time for Ferdinand Marcos's 60th birthday. The Sandiganbayan anti-graft court stripped the Marcoses of the property in 2014, voiding a 1978 agreement between Marcos and the then PTA, deciding that since it is a national park, the Marcos family had no legal rights over it since national parks are "inalienable public domain". Bongbong Marcos objected to the decision, saying the property was owned by the family.

=== Eastern Visayas Properties ===
In Tolosa, Leyte, a muti-million dollar 42-hectare seaside resort with a 17-room mansion once called "The Malacanang of the South" was constructed in 1974, in time for the Marcoses to entertain participants of the 1974 Miss Universe beauty contest, which was being held in the Philippines that year. Located in Bgy. Olot, the property boasts a 9-hole golf course designed by Jack Nicklaus, that wraps around Mt. Inapusong. The said mountain has an old Spanish fort, which currently hosts the Shrine of the Sacred Heart. The property was seized by the PCGG after the 1986 EDSA Revolution in 1987. Around the late 1990s the property was being rented by an American for PhP 1,000.00 / month. On December 12, 2010, the Supreme Court upheld the decision of the Sandiganbayan that voided the sequestration of the property by the PCGG. The property was severely damaged by Typhoon Haiyan in 2013.

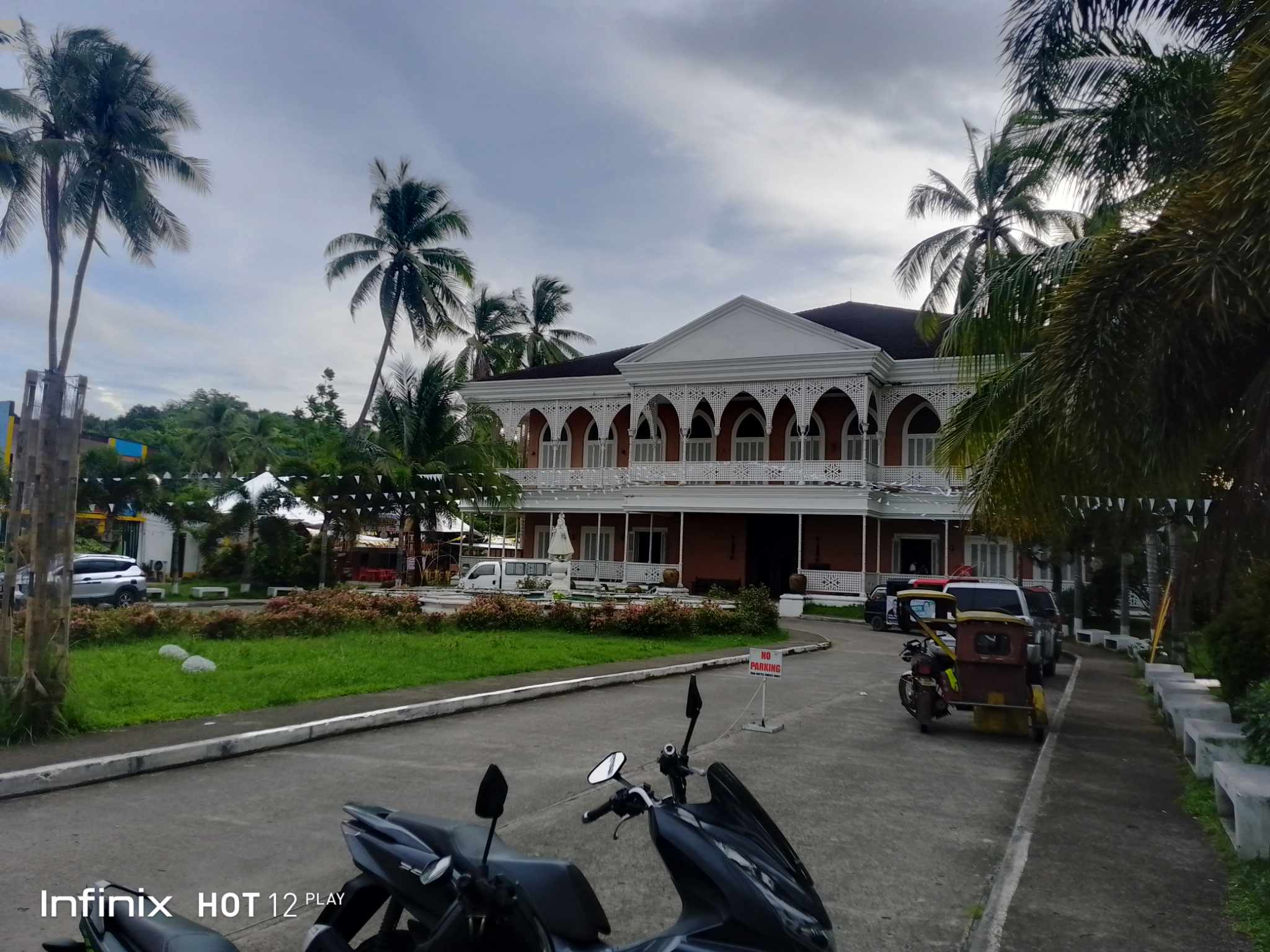
Santo Niño Shrine and Heritage Museum

In November 2023, reports came that the Olot property was being renovated by President Bongbong Marcos.

A different mansion, in Tacloban, is noted for having been the former site of the "impoverished Quonset hut" which was Imelda Marcos's childhood home. When her husband became president of the Philippines, Imelda transformed the site into a 2000 square meter mansion with a shrine to the Santo Niño and a museum, which has since been dubbed the "Santo Niño Shrine and Heritage Museum". The site was less damaged by Typhoon Haiyan than the Olot mansion was, but still sustained at least PhP20 million worth of damages. The Presidential Commission on Good Government, which had sequestered the property, decided to repair the site since it had been converted to a tourist site which was a major money-earner for Leyte.

=== Properties in other provinces ===
There is also what is known as the Marcos Twin Mansion built by Imelda Marcos in Bgy. Casile, Cabuyao, Laguna, on the property donated by Jose Yulo, for their 25th Wedding Anniversary. Ferdinand Marcos in turn gifted Imelda with 25 gold bullions.

Ferdinand Marcos also expropriated Talaga Beach in Mariveles, Bataan for his family's exclusive use. The beach estate sequestered by the PCGG.

Another property in Bataan province is the 50,000 sqm Piedras Property in Bgy. Cabcabe, Mariveles which has been turned over to the Department of Agrarian Reform.

== Use of government money for construction and maintenance ==
Verification by the Philippine government's Commission on Audit after the ouster of the Marcos family revealed that the construction, renovation, and maintenance of these various houses were paid for by the Philippine government through the office of the President. Maintenance and upkeep alone cost at least US$3.2 million in 1984 and US$10.5 million in 1985, all at prevailing exchange rates and not yet adjusted for inflation.

According to the calculations of author Ricardo Manapat, this would have been sufficient to feed "a small town of 48,000 people," or "8,000 starving families of 6" for a year.

== List of current and former properties owned by the Marcos clan ==
Property	Address	Size	Property value	Personality	Date acquired	Notes	Coordinates
San Juan Residence	204 Mariano Marcos Street, Maytunas, San Juan, Metro Manila	1,993 m^{2} (21,450 sq ft)	PhP 111 million (2003)	Ferdinand Marcos	August 1951	Acquired during Ferdinand Marcos's term as congressman. Currently used by Imee Marcos as her registered address. Location was originally named Ortega Street. Joseph Estrada, during his term as mayor of San Juan, endorsed this to the city council for the renaming as Mariano Marcos Street.	14°35′41.4666″N 121°2′13.1208″E
P. Guevarra House and Lot	362 P. Guevarra Street corner Maude Street, Maytunas, San Juan, Metro Manila	864 m^{2} (9,300 sq ft)		Ferdinand Marcos, Imelda Marcos		Currently used by Imee Marcos as the official address of her media outfit, Creative Media and Film Society of the Philippines.	14°35′38.7486″N 121°2′13.3398″E
C.M. Recto Mansion	C. M. Recto Street corner Mariano Marcos Street, Maytunas, San Juan, Metro Manila	932 m^{2} (10,030 sq ft)		Ferdinand Marcos, Imelda Marcos			14°35′43.5408″N 121°2′11.9508″E
Pacific Plaza Penthouse	34/F, Pacific Plaza Tower, 4th Avenue, West Crescent Park, Bonifacio Global City, Taguig, Metro Manila			Imelda Marcos		Current residence of Imelda Marcos	14°32′50.3766″N 121°2′42.0216″E
Seaside	Arias Compound and Vilmar Court, Quirino Avenue, Tambo, Parañaque	3,269 m^{2} (35,190 sq ft)		Bongbong Marcos	September 1977		14°30′36″N 120°59′34″E
IRC Mapalad Property	Roxas Boulevard, Tambo, Parañaque	4,038 m^{2} (43,460 sq ft)	PhP 278,622,000 (2012)	Jose Campos Yao			14°31′22″N 120°59′39″E
International School of Manila Property	Kalayaan Avenue, Makati	4.5 ha (11 acres)	PhP 1.9 billion (2003)				14°33′56″N 121°01′42″E
Wack-Wack House & Lot	EDSA cor. Berkeley St., Wack-Wack Village, Wack Wack-Greenhills, Mandaluyong	2,012sqm	PhP 127 million (2011)	Imee Marcos, Tomas Manotoc	1983	The PCGG sold the property in 2011 for PhP 127 million.	14°35′15″N 121°03′21″E
Forbes Park	52 McKinley Road, Forbes Park, Makati			Irene Marcos, Gregorio Maria Araneta II			14°32′53″N 121°02′01″E
Forbes Park	27 Tamarind St., Forbes Park, Makati City			Ferdinand Marcos, Imelda Marcos, Bienvenido Tantoco Sr., Gliceria Tantoco, Dominador Santiago			14°32′53″N 121°02′01″E
Dasmariñas Village	Dasmariñas Village, Makati		PhP 200 million (1994)	Ferdinand Marcos, Jose Campos Yao			
BF Homes Parañaque	BF Homes Parañaque			Bongbong Marcos			14°26′24″N 121°01′04″E
IRC San Isidro Antipolo	San Isidro, Antipolo		PhP 27.6 million (1995)	Ferdinand Marcos, Jose Campos Yao		Sold by the PCGG in 1995.	
IRC Antipolo – Victoria Valley	Victoria Valley Subdivision, Antipolo		P32.3 million (1996)	Ferdinand Marcos, Jose Campos Yao		Sold by the PCGG in 1996.	
Malacañang of the North	Paoay, Ilocos Norte	57 ha		Ferdinand Marcos	1977	Built for Ferdinand Marcos's 60th birthday by the Philippine Tourism Authority.	18°07′41″N 120°32′24″E
Currimao Property	Currimao, Ilocos Norte		PhP 1,426,710	Ferdinand Marcos			
Marcos House	44 Outlook Drive, Baguio			Ferdinand Marcos, Imelda Marcos			16°24′54″N 120°37′35″E
Hans Menzi Estate	Outlook Drive, Baguio	3,875.57 m^{2} (41,716.3 sq ft)	PhP 37,245,850.00 (2012)	Irene Marcos		The PCGG sold the property for PhP 93 million in 2012. Currently, the property hosts the Outlook Steak & Grill and the Grand Sierra Pines Baguio.	16°24′55″N 120°37′33″E
Wigwam Compound	Outlook Drive, Baguio	1,146 ha (2,830 acres)		Bongbong Marcos			16°24′51″N 120°37′31″E
Fairmont House Compound	Outlook Drive, Baguio			Imee Marcos			
Banaue Inn Compound	Outlook Drive, Baguio	2,677 m^{2} (28,810 sq ft)					
Lualhati Residence / J.Y. Campos Property	Outlook Drive, Baguio		PhP 160 million (2014)	Ferdinand Marcos, Jose Y. Campos		The PCGG sold property in 2014	
Talaga Beach	Mariveles, Bataan	129.4 ha (320 acres)		Ferdinand Marcos, Anchor Estate Inc.			14°25′00″N 120°29′24″E
Marcos Twin Mansion	Yulo Estate, Cabuyao, Laguna			Ferdinand Marcos, Imelda Marcos	1979	Built for the 25th Wedding Anniversary of Ferdinand Marcos and Imelda Romualdez.	14°12′12″N 121°2′31″E
PJI Beach	Mabini, Batangas						
Calauit Island)	Calauit Island, Palawan	3,700 ha (9,100 acres)		Ferdinand Marcos, Bongbong Marcos	1976		12°16′46″N 119°52′56″E
Olot Estate	Tolosa, Leyte	42 ha (100 acres)		Imelda Marcos	1974	Built by Imelda Marcos as the family's beach resort, which included a 17-room mansion, and 9-hole golf course designed by Jack Nicklaus. Sequestered in 1987 by the PCGG. In 2010 the Supreme Court ruled that the sequestration was invalid, and had the property returned to Imelda Marcos.	11°4′15.5604″N 125°2′12.4218″E
Santo Niño Shrine and Heritage Museum	Tacloban	2,000sqm mansion		Imelda Marcos	1981	Built in 1979 to 1981 as the Marcos residence in Tacloban.	14°30′36″N 120°59′34″E

== See also ==
- Unexplained wealth of the Marcos family
- Marcos jewels
- Overseas landholdings of the Marcos family
- Malacañang of the North
- The Mansion (Baguio)
- Cronies of Ferdinand Marcos
