= Malacañang of the South =

Residence and Office in Davao City, Philippines

- Malacañang sa Habagatan

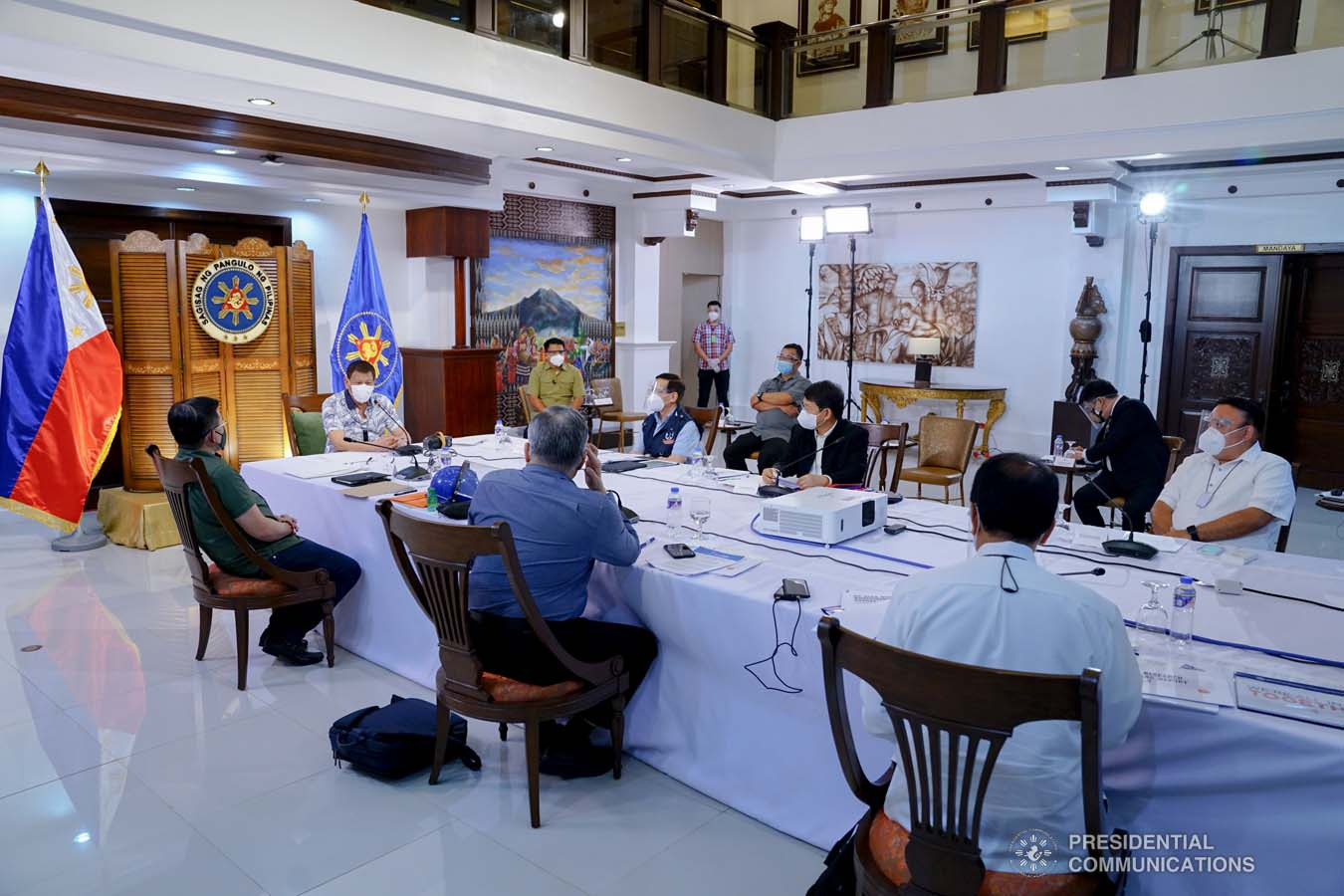
- President Rodrigo Duterte holds a meeting with the Inter-Agency Task Force for the Management of Emerging Infectious Diseases at the Presidential Guest House in August 2020
- Interactive map of the Malacañang of the South area
- Alternative names: Presidential Guest House in Davao; Balay na Pinuy-anan sa Presidente sa Dabaw; Panacañang

General information
- Type: Residence and Office
- Location: DPWH Region 11 Compound, Brgy. Panacan, Davao City, Philippines, Philippines
- Coordinates: 7°8′59″N 125°39′38″E
- Current tenants: Bongbong Marcos; President of the Philippines
- Completed: 2007
- Owner: Government of the Philippines

The Malacañang of the South, also known as the Presidential Guest House in Davao or Panacañang, is a presidential guest house in Panacan, Davao City that serves as the Philippine President's official residence in Mindanao. It is located in the compound and office complex of the Department of Public Works and Highways (DPWH) Davao Region.

== History ==
Conceived under the administration of President Gloria Macapagal Arroyo in 2005, when the Office of the President acquired the property inside the DPWH Compound in Davao City, the two-storey guesthouse was completed in 2007. It was planned to serve as an official residence of the subsequent presidents when visiting Davao and the surrounding provinces. However, it was used only once by Macapagal-Arroyo and was only used as a staging point by President Benigno Aquino III in his visits to the city and the nearby Samal Island and Santa Cruz, Davao del Sur.

President Rodrigo Duterte indicated that the guest house will have a more active role in his administration. It served as his active office and residence and an alternative to Malacañang Palace in Manila. It was in active use as a meeting place for his Cabinet.

== Facilities ==
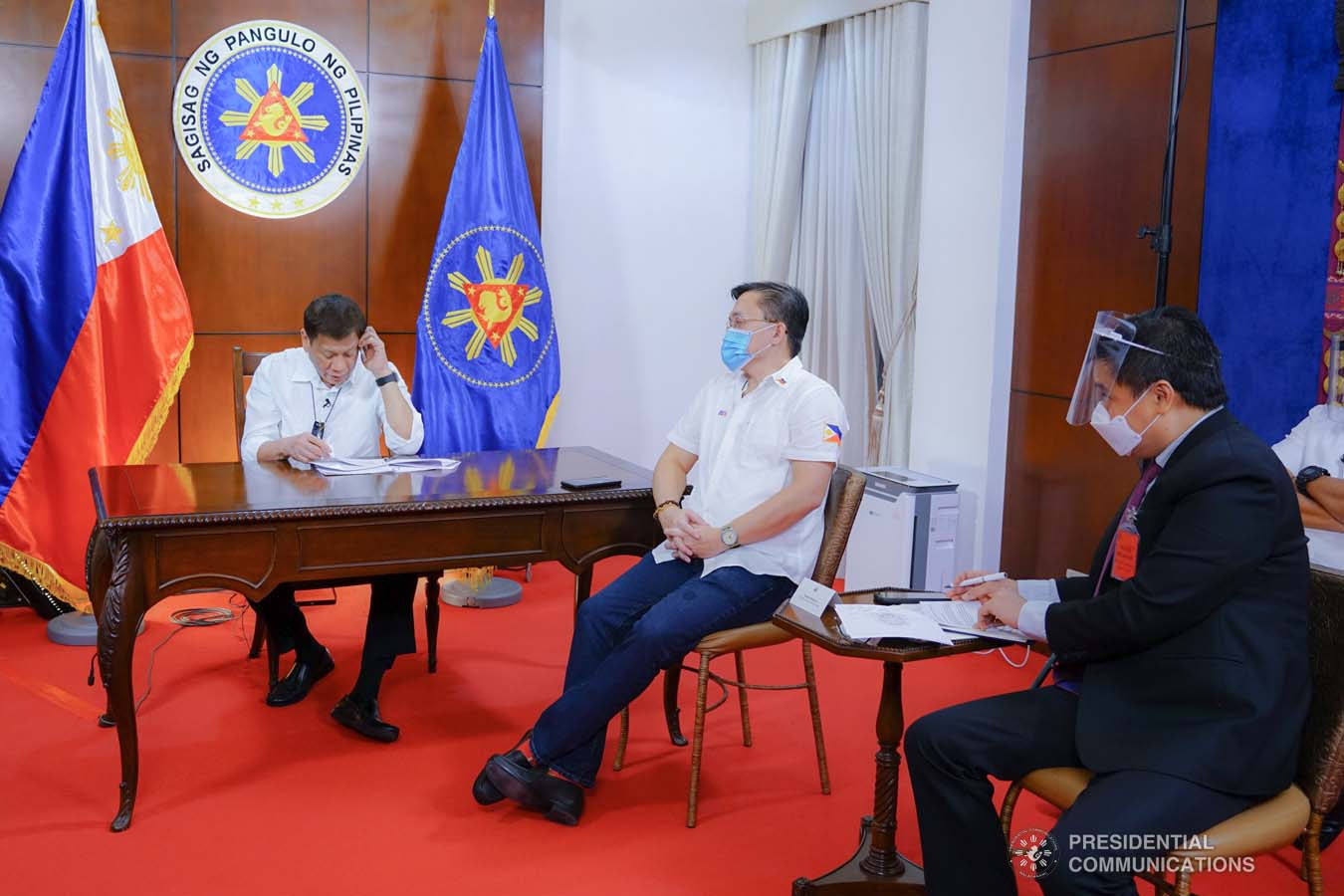
Duterte on the phone with Indian Prime Minister Narendra Modi at the office of the Presidential Guest House

The Malacañang of the South contains eight airconditioned rooms as the living quarters of the President, staff and VIPs, along with a conference room and a personal working office. Overlooking the sea, it has a view of the Island Garden City of Samal and includes a jetty for transport to the island, fitted to the presidential yacht, BRP Ang Pangulo (AT-25). The complex also has a helipad shared with the DPWH warehouse facilities.

The building includes spaces for use by the state broadcasters, PTV4 and Radio Television Malacañang (RTVM), the only media entities allowed in the facility.

== See also ==
- Malacañang Palace, the official residence and working office of the President of the Philippines
- Malacañang sa Sugbo, the former residence of the President of the Philippines in the Visayas
- Malacañang of the North, presidential museum and former official residence of the President of the Philippines in Ilocos Region
- The Mansion (Baguio), the official summer residence of the President of the Philippines
