= Jose Yao Campos =

Filipino-Chinese businessman and Founder of Unilab, Inc.

- Born: Yao Cho Liat; September 16, 1921; Jinjiang, Fujian, Republic of China
- Died: May 1, 2006 (aged 84); Manila, Philippines
- Occupation: Businessman
- Known for: Founder of Unilab

Chinese name
- Chinese: 姚祖烈
- Hanyu Pinyin: Yáo Zǔliè
- Hokkien POJ: Iâu Chó͘-lia̍t

Jose Yao Campos (September 16, 1921 – May 1, 2006), also known by his Chinese name Yao Cho Liat, was a Filipino businessman best known as the founder of Unilab. He became an early supporter of Philippine president Ferdinand Marcos, who tapped him as a "financial advisor." In 1986, the Presidential Commission on Good Government (PCGG) cited him for having served as a "front man" for various "ill-gotten" wealth, including $52.5 million of real estate representing the most prominent Marcos Mansions. He became the first of the Marcos cronies to make a deal with the PCGG in exchange for immunity from suit. By the time he died in 2006, his family had become one of the Philippines' most powerful business clans, with Unilab helmed by his firstborn, Joy Campos Hess and her son, Clinton Hess. His eldest son Joselito Campos founded the food company NutriAsia and acquired in Del Monte Philippines and Del Monte Pacific; and his youngest child Jeffrey Campos running Greenfields Development Corporation.

== Early life and move to the Philippines ==
Yao Campos was born Yao Cho Diat in Ha-ngo-po, a village in Jinjing Town, Jinjiang, part of modern-day Quanzhou, China. He lived there as a youth and was educated in the Chinese classics until he was old enough to be accepted for admission to the Whampoa Military Academy established by Sun Yat-sen—an honor which he described as "the ultimate dream of all patriotic Chinese boys." Instead of allowing him to attend the academy, however, his father sent Yao to Quezon province in the Philippines, where he would learn business skills from his older brother Yao Shiong Shio, who was already a successful trader.

Yao Campos started out as a worker at his brother's buntal hat business before the war and survived the Second World War by making his living as a buy-and-sell trader.

He eventually adopted the name Jose Yao Campos as his Filipino name.

== Foundation of Unilab ==
Soon after the end of World War II in 1945, Yao Campos partnered with Mariano K. Tan to build a drugstore on Sto. Cristo Street in Binondo, Manila. (Some sources also mention an American soldier named Robert Horowitz as Yao Campos' partner in charge of production when the drugstore was first built.)

Describing the beginnings of the company, Yao Campos' brother-in-law and later Unilab president Howard Q. Dee later recounted:

"Unilab started with humble beginnings as a small manufacturing enterprise. Our offices and modest production facilities were located in JY’s residential compound in Santa Mesa. We literally began as a home industry with no more than 30 employees. With the new monetary policies, in no time, a dozen foreign pharmaceutical companies established large manufacturing facilities. Unilab was the smallest but under the leadership of JY, we developed a game plan like no other. Our strategic planning showed us the way to segment the pharma market with a multi-divisional approach that would enable us to compete on all fronts. The keys were product sourcing and planning, synergism in promotions and distribution outreach."

By 1959, after only fourteen years in operation, Yao Campos and Tan, with the help of Yao Campos' brother-in-law Dee, had transformed United Drug into United Laboratories, with the highest share of the Philippine pharmaceuticals market among all the Philippines' local drug manufacturers. This was attributed to the values Yao Campos was said to have instilled in the company, which admirers described as "the Confucian values of hard work, frugality, discipline, perseverance, filial piety to parents and ancestors, love of education and delayed personal gratification."

Under Yao Campos, Unilab remained a proudly non-unionized company, with a company-initiated Employee's Council providing benefits to employees instead of a union negotiating with the company on their behalf. Unionization was so much of "a no-no to the owners" of Unilab that they went as far as to hire a feng shui expert to redesign their corporate headquarters in response to a 1996 incident in which union organizers nearly succeeded in forming a union.

== Early support of Ferdinand Marcos ==
Yao Campos was an early supporter of Ferdinand Marcos, making campaign contributions as early as Marcos’ first congressional run in 1946. He would eventually become one of the closest among Marcos’ cronies, along with Danding Cojuangco and Roberto Benedicto.

Although critics of the Marcos administration would later note that Marcos’ cronies managed to make huge fortunes despite not being known as particularly good businessmen, Yao Campos and Rolando Gapud were often considered the notable exceptions, because of their established business record prior to Marcos’ presidency.

Nevertheless, Marcos’ stint in the legislature allowed him to favor Yao Campos’ business. Having won as congressman, Marcos was soon made chair of the House Committee on Commerce and Industry. When he won a seat in the senate later, he became a member of the Senate Special Committee on Import and Price Controls and on Reparations. This allowed Marcos to make his fortune by selling import licenses to businessmen. His campaign benefactor Yao Campos’ company Unilab was granted exclusive import licenses in the pharmaceuticals industry.

Because Unilab's market dominance turned it into a major supplier of pharmaceuticals for government health programs, Yao Campos found another way to help build up Ferdinand Marcos during campaigns: by supplying the government with medicine packs branded "Medical Assistance to Rural Communities and Other Sectors" – the acronym for which spelled out "M.A.R.C.O.S."

Marcos eventually asked Yao Campos to become godfather to both Imee and Bongbong Marcos.

== "Front man" for the Marcoses ==
As an early supporter of Marcos, Yao Campos became a financial advisor to the president. While it was Roberto Benedicto who helped the Marcoses open a Swiss bank account under the fictitious names "William Saunders" and "Jane Ryan", it was Yao Campos who organized 40 different shell companies through whose bank accounts the Marcoses could later transfer the Saunders account money, giving them multiple additional layers beneath which to hide their identity.

He also served as the Marcoses' "front man" for various assets and properties. The most widely publicized of these properties include the most prominent Marcos mansions—over P2.5 billion ($52.5 million) worth in real estate located in Metro Manila, Rizal, Laguna, Cavite, Bataan, and Baguio.

== Cooperation with the PCGG ==
Yao Campos was in Canada in 1986 when Corazon Aquino's revolutionary government took over the Philippines after the Marcoses were deposed by the EDSA revolution. He was the first among the Marcos cronies to make a deal with the Aquino government in exchange for immunity from suit, and the deal he struck with the Presidential Commission on Good Government (PCGG) was one of the agency's earliest successes.

The 1986 settlement involved PHP250 million in cash and PHP2.5 billion worth of titles to 197 properties in Metro Manila, Rizal, Laguna, Cavite, Bataan, and Baguio—all of which Yao Campos admitted were under his name but actually part of the ill-gotten wealth of Ferdinand Marcos. It also included a building along EDSA in Mandaluyong City, where Imee Marcos had an office before the EDSA revolution, which eventually became the headquarters of the PCGG.

In 2007, the Marcos family confirmed that the properties surrendered by Yao Campos to the PCGG in 1986 were indeed owned by Ferdinand Marcos, arguing that Yao Campos should not have surrendered them to the government because "under a constructive trust in favor of the estate of the former president."

== Later life, death, and family empire ==
After the People Power Revolution, Yao Campos earned a reputation as the most media-shy of all the Philippines’ taipans. By the time of Yao Campos' death on May 1, 2006, Unilab had become the Philippines’ largest drug-manufacturing company. Unilab is currently headed by his eldest child, Joy Campos Hess, and her son, Clinton Hess.

His sons have also become dominant forces in their own industries, making the family one of the Philippines’ most powerful business clans. His eldest son, Joselito D. Campos Jr., founded the food company NutriAsia, and is now also the vice chairman of Del Monte Philippines, and the chairman of Fort Bonifacio Development Corporation. Another son, Jeffrey D. Yao Campos, runs the real estate holdings company Greenfield Development Corporation.

== See also ==
- Cronies of Ferdinand Marcos
- Timeline of the Marcos dictatorship
- Marcos mansions
- Presidential Commission on Good Government
- Ferdinand Marcos
- Roberto Benedicto
