= Overseas landholdings of the Marcos family =

Holdings of Ferdinand and Imelda Marcos

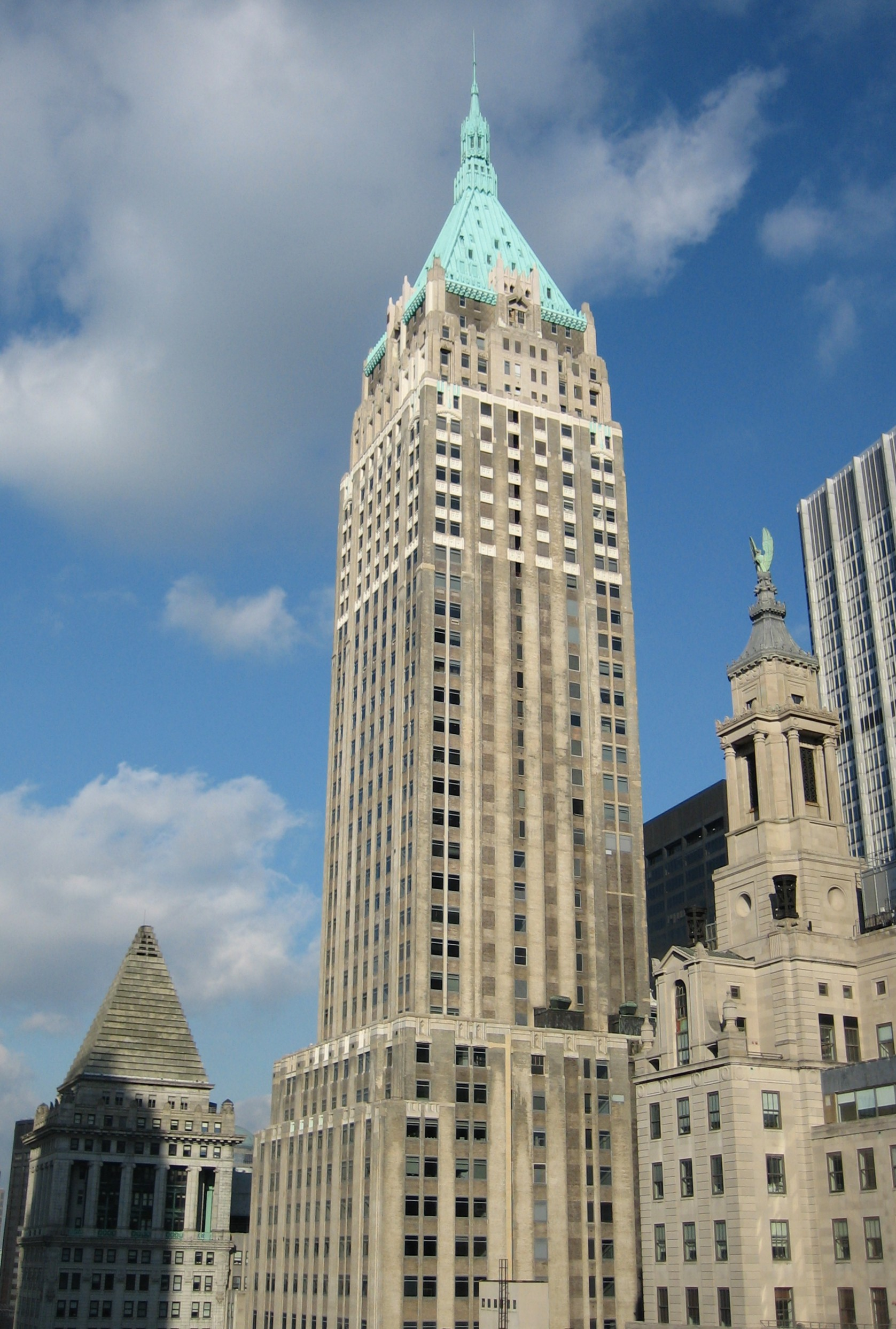
A 2005 image of 40 Wall Street, one of four Manhattan buildings purchased by the Marcoses in the early 1980s

The overseas landholdings of the Marcos family, which the Philippine government and the United Nations System's Stolen Asset Recovery Initiative consider part of the $5 billion to $13 billion "ill-gotten wealth" of Ferdinand and Imelda Marcos, are said to be distributed worldwide in places including California, Washington, New York, Rome, Vienna, Australia, Antilles, the Netherlands, Hong Kong, Switzerland and Singapore. These are aside from the fifty-or-so Marcos mansions acquired by the Marcos family in the Philippines itself.

The best known of these properties are the Marcoses' multimillion dollar real estate investments in the United States, particularly Imelda's purchases of buildings and real estate in New York, the estates purchased in New Jersey for the use of the Marcos children, Jose Yao Campos's investments in Seattle, various properties in Hawaii including the Makiki Heights estate where they lived during their exile, and their ownership of the California Overseas Bank in Los Angeles. According to Ricardo Manapat's book Some Are Smarter Than Others, which was one of the earliest to document details of the Marcos wealth, lesser-known properties include gold and diamond investments in South Africa, banks and hotels in Israel, and various landholdings in Austria, London, and Rome.

Many of these properties are said to have been acquired under the name of several Marcos cronies. One of them, Jose Yao Campos, cooperated with the Philippine government and made an immunity deal, revealing how he fronted Marcos's investments both locally and abroad via numerous interlocking shell corporations.

== Overseas landholdings as “ill-gotten wealth” ==
The Philippine Supreme Court considers these landholdings as part of the ill-gotten wealth of the Marcos family, based on the definitions set forth in Republic Act 1379, which had been passed in 1955.

The Supreme Court's interpretation of R.A. 1379 says that property acquired by a public officer or employee which is "manifestly out of proportion to his salary as such public officer and to his other lawful income" is "presumed prima facie to have been unlawfully acquired." The bulk of the assets of the Marcoses, including the Marcos jewels, were treated as "ill gotten" in a 2012 decision which specified that "according to the Official Report of the Minister of Budget, the total salaries of former President Marcos as President from 1966 to 1976 was ₱60,000 a year and from 1977 to 1985, ₱100,000 a year; while that of the former First Lady, Imelda R. Marcos, as Minister of Human Settlements from June 1976 to February 22–25, 1986, was ₱75,000 a year" – about $304,372. The PCGG in its reports would state that the lawful tax declared income of the Marcos couple only amounted from 1960 to 1984 would only amount to PhP 8,148,289.42.

== Properties in the United States ==
=== Manhattan properties ===
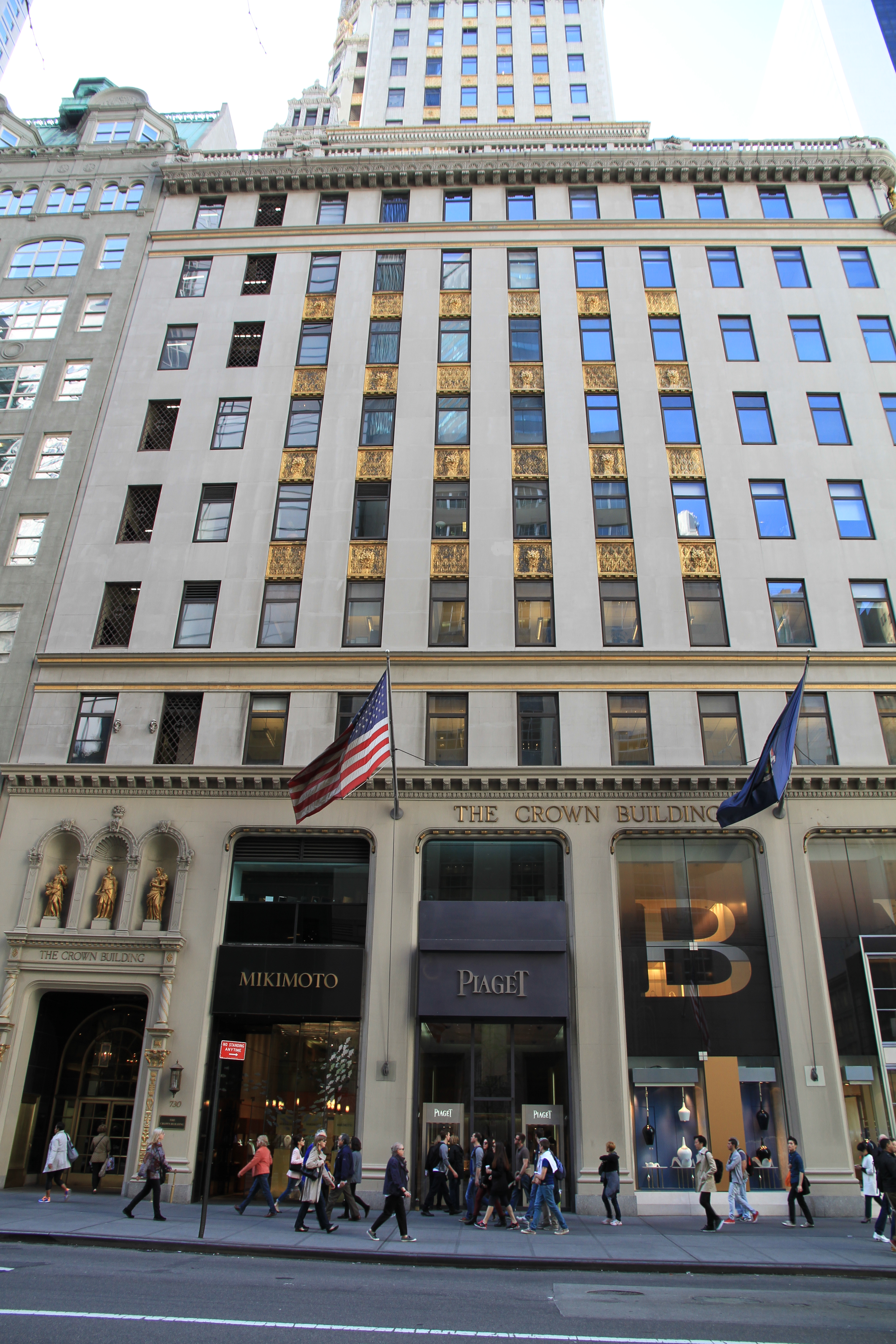
A 2013 image of the Crown Building, one of four Manhattan buildings purchased by the Marcoses in the early 1980s

The most prominent of the Marcoses' properties outside of the Philippines were four skyscrapers in Manhattan: Crown Building at 730 Fifth Avenue; the Herald Center at the intersection of Broadway, Sixth Avenue and 34th Street; 40 Wall Street, which has since been renamed the Trump building; and 200 Madison Avenue in Midtown South Central.

==== Crown Building ====
In 1981, the Marcoses acquired the Crown Building at 730 Fifth Avenue, purchasing it through Lasutra Corp. N.V. for $51 million, reportedly with help from Ralph and Joseph Bernstein as well as Adnan Khashoggi.

The building became the focus of various lawsuits after Marcos was deposed, with numerous parties including the Philippine government, laying claim to it saying the Marcoses had bought it with money that did not actually belong to them. The claimants eventually agreed to sell the building, and divided the proceeds after the building's $89 million mortgage had been paid.

In 1986, The Washington Post reported that in coded cables between the Marcos Family and their alleged "front" in Manhattan, Gliceria Tantoco, the Crown Building was referred to using the secret code-word "Farragamo."

==== Herald Center ====
In July 1982 it was announced that "a small group of foreign investors operating as Voloby Ltd., a British Virgin Islands company" had bought the site of the Korvettes building at Herald Square for about $25 million, with the intent of turning it into a shopping center by 1983. These investors were later revealed to have been the Marcoses.

According to The Washington Post, the Herald Center was referred to using the secret code-word "Midtown Cement" in coded cables between the Marcos Family and their alleged "front" in Manhattan, Gliceria Tantoco.

After several delays, Herald Center eventually opened in 1985, but suffered low sales because of its association with the Marcoses, who had been ousted from power in 1986 and soon faced numerous court cases.

==== 40 Wall Street ====
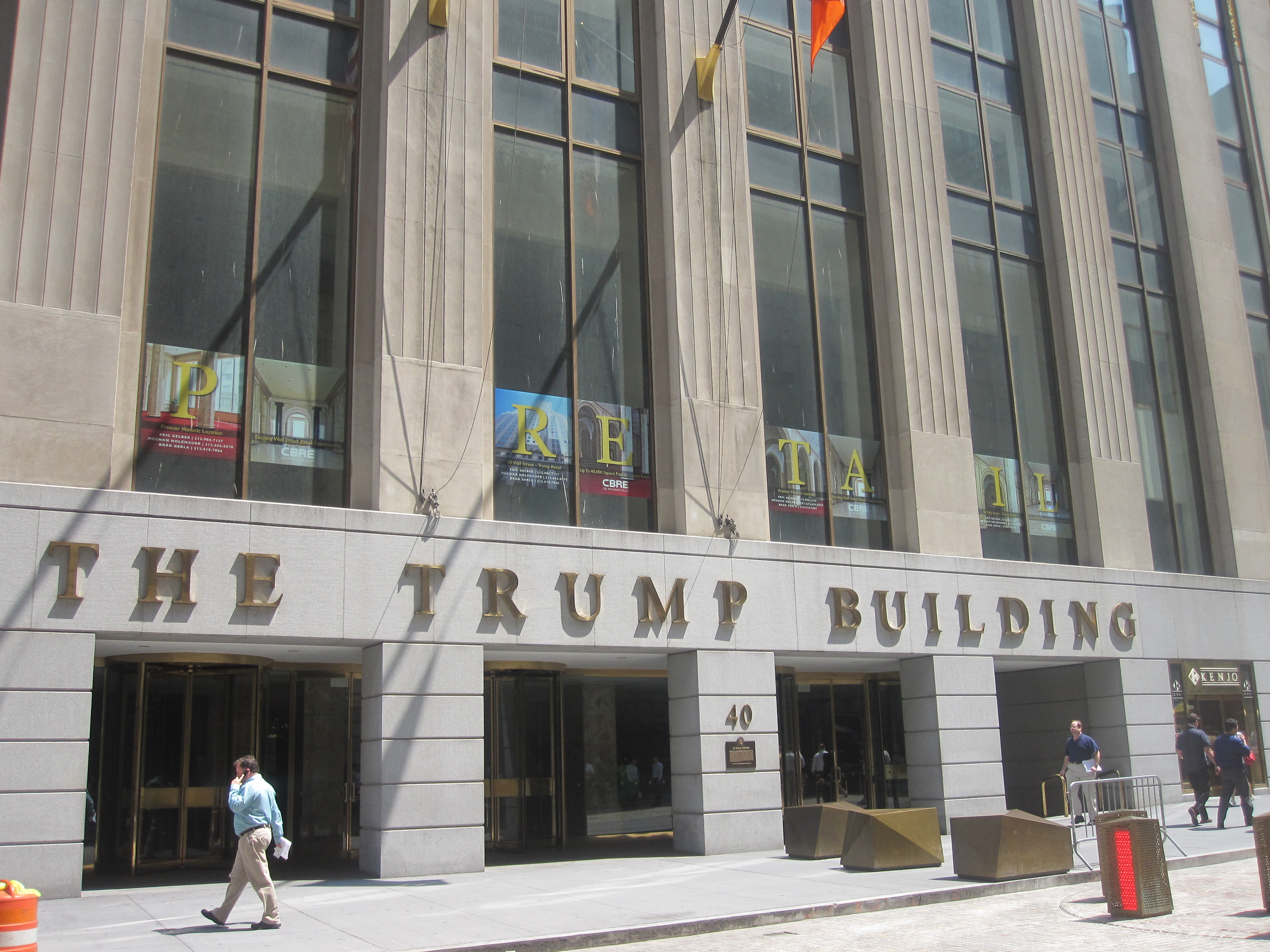
40 Wall Street at ground level

In 1982, the Marcoses also purchased 40 Wall Street, a large historic building in New York's Financial District bought for $71 million through NYLand (CF8) Ltd., a shell corporation based in the Netherlands Antilles.

The building's ownership changed hands a few times after the Marcoses were removed from power in 1986, but the lease was transferred to Donald Trump in December 1995, and the building was renamed the "Trump Building".

In 1986, The Washington Post noted that in coded cables between the Marcos Family and their alleged "front" in Manhattan, Gliceria Tantoco, the 40 Wall Street building was referred to using the secret code-word "Bridgetown."

==== 200 Madison ====
The Marcoses also purchased 200 Madison Avenue, an office building acquired for $50 million.

In 1986, The Washington Post reported that in coded cables between the Marcos Family and their alleged "front" in Manhattan, Gliceria Tantoco, 200 Madison was referred to using the secret code-word "Lafayette."

==== Manhattan condominiums ====
===== Olympic Tower =====
Aside from the four skyscrapers they purchased in Manhattan, the Marcoses also purchased five condominiums at Olympic Tower on 5th Avenue. According to Manapat's investigation, the first three condominiums were purchased by Thetaventure Ltd., a Hong Kong-based shell corporation, for a total of $688,000. They were then remodelled for $3.75 million. The fourth and fifth condominiums were later bought for $270,000 and $1.1 million respectively.

===== 13-15 East 66th =====
The Townhouse at 13-15 East 66th, New York City, was different from the other Marcos properties in Manhattan, because it was purchased by the Philippine Consulate and the Philippine National Bank instead of a shell corporation. The building was noted for having housed a big part of Imelda Marcos's art collection, and for the fact that its sixth floor was converted into a private disco for the Marcoses' guests.

=== Lindenmire Estate on Long Island ===
In 1981, the Marcoses also purchased the Lindenmere Estate, an 8.2-acre resort property with a 14-bedroom manse in Center Moriches, Suffolk County, Long Island. It was estimated to be worth between $19 million to $20 million after renovations were done. The restorations was paid for by Vilma Bautista, Imelda's personal assistant, and Luna 7 Development Corp., a corporation registered in New York.

=== Properties in New Jersey ===
In New Jersey while she was still studying, Imee Marcos, President Ferdinand Marcos's eldest daughter, was given an 18th-century estate to live in. The estate was purchased on October 26, 1982, and includes a mansion and 13 acres of land. The Marcos family is said to have spent approximately $3 to $5 million in furnishings and improvements.

President Marcos's only son, Bongbong, was given a house in Cherry Hill, New Jersey, purchased for $119,000, while he was studying in the Wharton Business School of the University of Pennsylvania. Another property in the area was bought on November 23, 1978, for $90,000, for the servants and security that were serving his son.

=== Properties in Texas ===
When he cooperated with the Philippine government after the Marcoses were deposed in 1986, Jose Yao Campos indicated that he had purchased $51 million worth of land in Texas on behalf of the Marcoses throughout the late 1970s and early 1980s. This included 5,000 acres of prime land in Tarrant, Denton, Harris and Bexar counties, as well as land and buildings in and around Corpus Christi.

=== Properties in Seattle ===
Jose Yao Campos also revealed that on May 13, 1983, that he and some other close Marcos associates had purchased a whole city block in Seattle, at the price of $9,178,215.

A shell corporation based in Netherlands Antilles and headed by Campos, named Unam Investment Corp., was used in the transaction. The properties included 600 Pike Street, 614 Pike Street, 1506 Sixth Avenue, 1520 Sixth Avenue, 151 Seventh Avenue, 1521 Seventh Avenue and 1575 Seventh Avenue.

=== Property in Hawaii ===
Antonio Floirendo, another Marcos crony who turned over Marcos properties to the Presidential Commission on Good Government (PCGG) as part of a 1980s immunity deal, turned over a $1.35 million estate in Makiki Heights in Hawaii as part of his compromise agreement.

=== Property in California ===
As part of his compromise agreement with the PCGG, Floirendo also surrendered a $2.5 million Marcos property in Beverly Hills.

== Properties in Europe ==
Various reports also state that the Marcoses owned properties in Europe. A 1985 U.S. Senate Intelligence Committee report stated that the Marcoses owned a mansion in London, said to be worth $18 million; as well as an estate, worth $20 million, in Rome. A New York Post report recounts that Imelda provided 12-year-old Bongbong with a house in London and another in a country village, when he went to study in England in 1970.

== Locations ==
=== Properties directly connected to the Marcoses ===
| Property | Location | Country | Property Value | Personalities/Organization | Date Acquired | Coordinates |
|---|---|---|---|---|---|---|
| Crown Building, 730 5th Avenue | New York City, New York | USA | US$93.6 million | Imelda Marcos, Gliceria Tantoco, Joseph Bernstein, Ralph Bernstein, Lasutra N.V. (Netherlands Antilles) | September 1981 | 40°45′46.3242″N 73°58′28.3938″W |
| Herald Center, 1293 Broadway Avenue | New York City, New York | USA | US$90 million | Imelda Marcos, Gliceria Tantoco, Fe Roa Gimenez, Vilma Bautista, Voloby Ltd. | February 1982 | 40°44′59.3226″N 73°59′17.844″W |
| 40 Wall Street | New York City, New York | USA | US$71 million | Imelda Marcos, Jose Yao Campos, Rolando Gapud, NYLand (CF8) Ltd. (Netherlands Antilles) | 20 December 1983 | |
| 200 Madison Avenue | New York City, New York | USA | US$50 million | Imelda Marcos, Gliceria Tantoco, Fe Roa Gimenez, Vilma Bautista, Glockhurst Corp. N.V. (Curaçao) | 22 November 1983 | |
| Three adjacent condominium units at 43rd Floor, Olympic Tower, 641 and 645 Fifth Avenue | New York City, New York | USA | US$688,000 | Imelda Marcos, Antonio Floirendo, Vilma Bautista, Thetaventure Ltd. (Hong Kong) | 1981 | 40°45′33.8322″N 73°58′34.6044″W |
| 3850 Princeton Pike | Princeton, New Jersey | USA | US$1 million | Imee Marcos, Faylin Ltd. Corp. (British Virgin Islands), William Deyo, Bernstein, Carter & Deyo, Tristan Beplat | 26 October 1982 | 40°18′13.0386″N 74°41′54.1566″W |
| 19 Pendleton Drive | Cherry Hill, New Jersey | USA | US$119,000 | Bongbong Marcos, Tristan Beplat | | |
| 4 Capshire Drive | Cherry Hill, New Jersey | USA | US$90,000 | Bongbong Marcos, Julian Antolin Jr., Irvin P. Ver | 23 November 1978 | |
| 231 Dodds Lane | Princeton, New Jersey | USA | | Imee Marcos, Tristan Beplat, Samuel Lambert III | | |
| One condominium unit at Olympic Tower, 641 and 645 Fifth Avenue | New York City, New York | USA | | Ferdinand Marcos, Antonio Floirendo, Rodolfo del Rosario, Sugarbush Corp. N.V. (Netherlands Antilles) | | 40°45′33.8322″N 73°58′34.6044″W |
| Lindenmere Estate, 16 Sedgemere Road | Center Moriches, New York | USA | US$20 million | Imelda Marcos, Augusto Camacho, Vilma Bautista, Luna 7 Development Corp. | 1981 | 40°47′7.9368″N 72°47′39.48″W |
| Townhouse on 13-15 East 66th Street | New York City, New York | USA | US$5,950,000 | Imelda Marcos, Vilma Bautista, Luna 7 Development Corp., Thetaventure Ltd. (Hong Kong) | | |
| Webster Hotel, West 45th Street | New York City, New York | USA | US$1,577,000 | Imelda Marcos, Romeo Gatan | June 1980 | |

=== Properties connected with Marcos relatives and cronies ===
| Property | Location | Country | Property Value | Personalities/Organization | Date Acquired | Coordinates |
|---|---|---|---|---|---|---|
| 23411 Arminta Street | Los Angeles, California | USA | US$218,900 | Tolosa Resources | 1983 | 34°12′49″N 118°38′13″W |
| 3778 Callan Boulevard | South San Francisco, California | USA | US$120,000 | Eduardo V. Romualdez Jr., Buena T. Romualdez | 13 December 1984 | |
| 1580 Forest Villa Lane | McLean, Virginia | USA | US$500,000 | Antonio Romualdez | 1985 | |
| 2940 Privet Drive | Hillsborough, California | USA | US$1,000,000 | Margarita Romualdez-Licaros | | |
| Units 70 and 77, Grove Condominiums, 2790 19th Avenue | San Francisco, California | USA | US$1,000,000 | Margarita Romualdez-Licaros | | |
| One condominium unit at 1970 Scott Street | San Francisco, California | USA | US$200,000 | Margarita Romualdez-Licaros | July 1978 | |
| 281 Lake Drive | San Bruno, California | USA | US$200,000 | Margarita Romualdez-Licaros | July 1983 | |
| Pera Drive corner Plano Court | Rancho Murieta, California | USA | US$197,000 | Armando Romualdez, Vilma Romualdez | 1 June 1982 | |
| 511 North Oxford Avenue | Los Angeles, California | USA | | Fortuna Marcos-Barba | | |
| 2352 South Lynn Court | West Covina, California | USA | | Fortuna Marcos-Barba | 5 October 1981 | |
| 1115 Lakeview Drive | Hillsborough, California | USA | | Ricardo Silverio, Astroair Services | 5 October 1981 | |
| Apartment H, 29th Floor, Olympic Tower, 641 and 645 Fifth Avenue | New York City, New York | USA | US$270,000 | Antonio Floirendo, United Motors | September 1976 | 40°45′33.8322″N 73°58′34.6044″W |
| Unit 1602, Ten Miller Place | San Francisco, California | USA | | Mariano "Nonong" Marcos II | 18 November 1980 | 37°47′36″N 122°24′32″W |
| 4 lots in Brocktails Vacation Village | Willits, California | USA | US$66,014 (1985) | Roman Cruz | 1985 | |
| Unit 602, 840 Powell Street | San Francisco, California | USA | $650,000 (1984) | Roman Cruz, Middlesborough N.V. (Netherlands Antilles) | 9 June 1979 | |
| Units 52–57, Cypress Point Condominium Complex | Daly City, California | USA | US$900,000 | Roman Cruz, Philippine Airlines | 10 April 1980 | |

== See also ==
- Marcos mansions
- Marcos jewels
- Unexplained wealth of the Marcos family
