= Malacañang of the North =

Presidential museum in Paoay, Philippines

- Ilocano: Malacañang ti Amianan
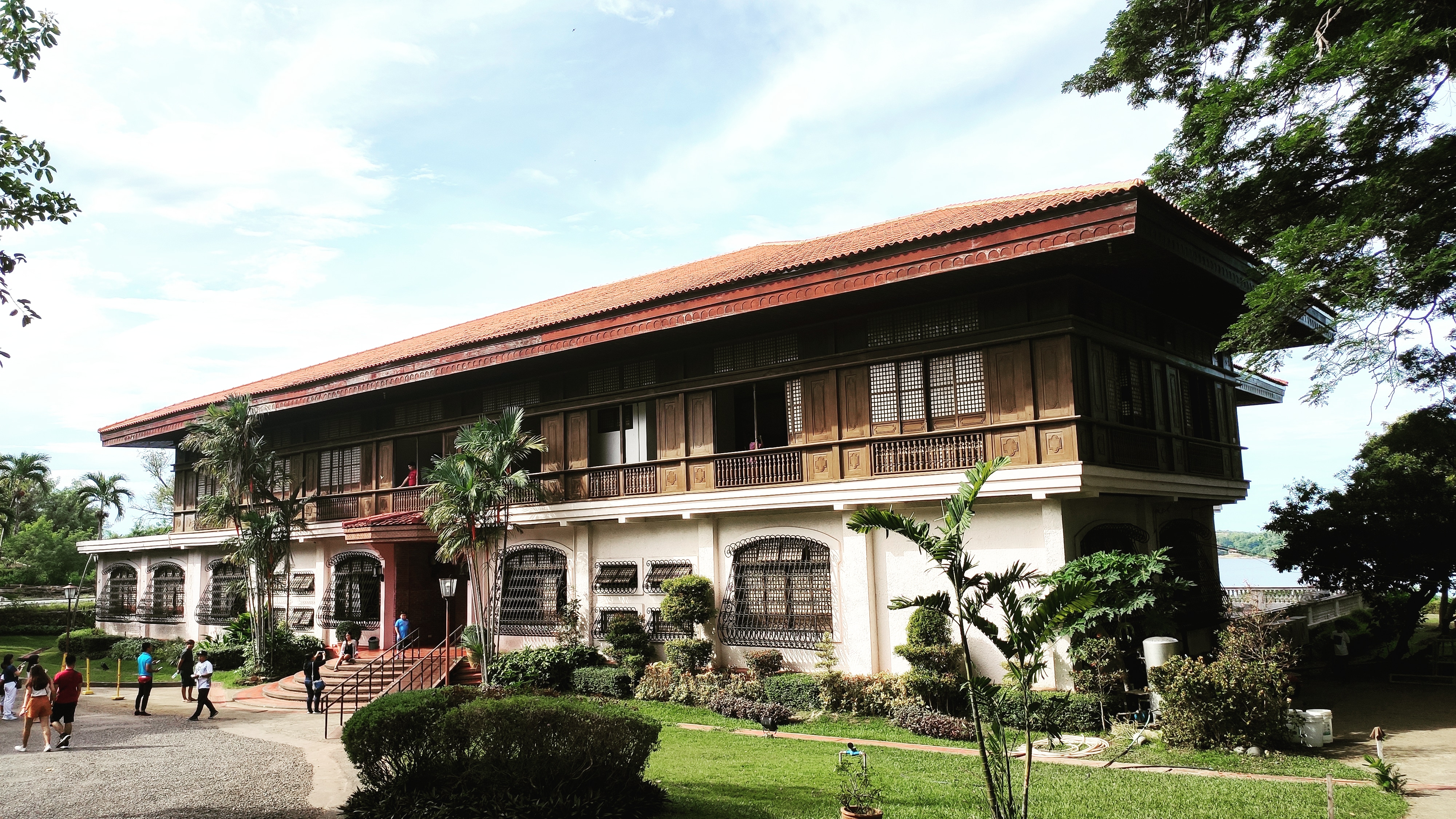
- Alternative names: Malacañan Palace (official)

General information
- Architectural style: Bahay na bato
- Location: Paoay, Ilocos Norte, Philippines
- Coordinates: 18°07′41″N 120°32′24″E

The Malacañang of the North (Ilocano: Malacañang ti Amianan; Filipino: Malakanyang sa Hilaga) is a presidential museum in Paoay, Ilocos Norte, Philippines. It was the residence of the family of Ferdinand Marcos when he was the President of the Philippines.

== History ==
The residence was built by the Philippine Tourism Authority (PTA; now the Tourism Infrastructure and Enterprise Zone Authority or TIEZA) in 1977 for Marcos's 60th birthday, and served as an official residence for the president's family when they were staying in Ilocos Norte.

It is a two-story mansion overlooking the Paoay Lake, and consists of seven (supposedly a lucky number for Marcos) rooms, with each room having a theme of historical events from the Marcos era: Study, Agriculture, Diplomacy, OFW (overseas Filipino workers), Culture, Nation Building and Family.

While being administered by TIEZA, Cecile Licad played a Frédéric Chopin program at the property in 2001.

Usage of the property was turned over by the former president Benigno Aquino III to the Ilocos Norte provincial government in 2010. Governor Imee Marcos, Ferdinand Marcos's daughter, then had the property refurbished to be one of the province's tourist attractions. Eric Zerrudo, of the University of Santo Tomas Center for Conservation of Cultural Property and Environment in the Tropics, was commissioned to put together the exhibits in every room, with each room centering on a theme of Marcos's public programs.

The Sandiganbayan anti-graft court stripped the Marcoses of the property in 2014, after it voided a 1978 agreement between Marcos and the then PTA, deciding that since it is a national park, Marcos had no legal rights over it since national parks are "inalienable public domain", despite claims by Bongbong Marcos, the son of the former president, that the property was owned by their family.

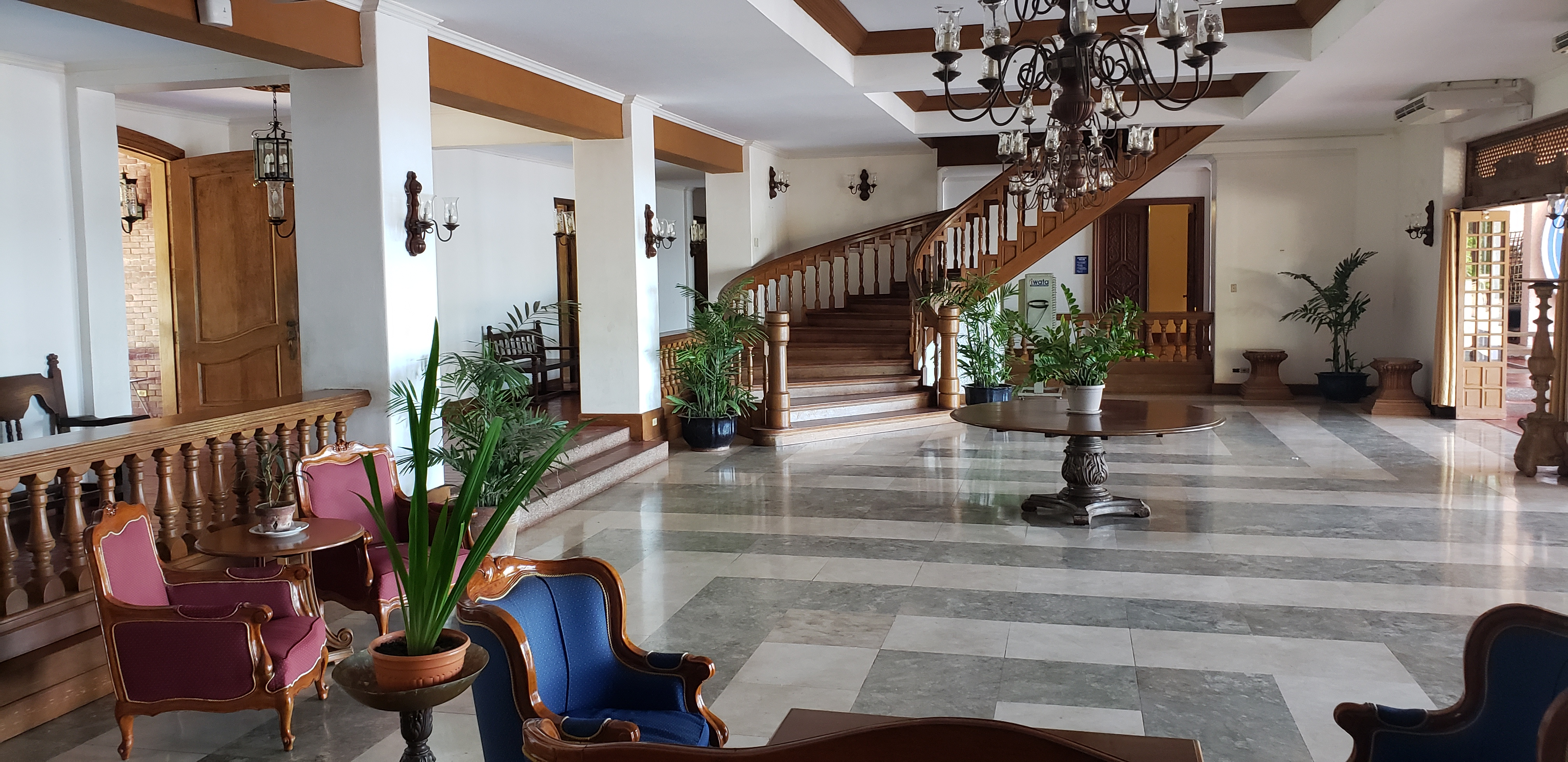
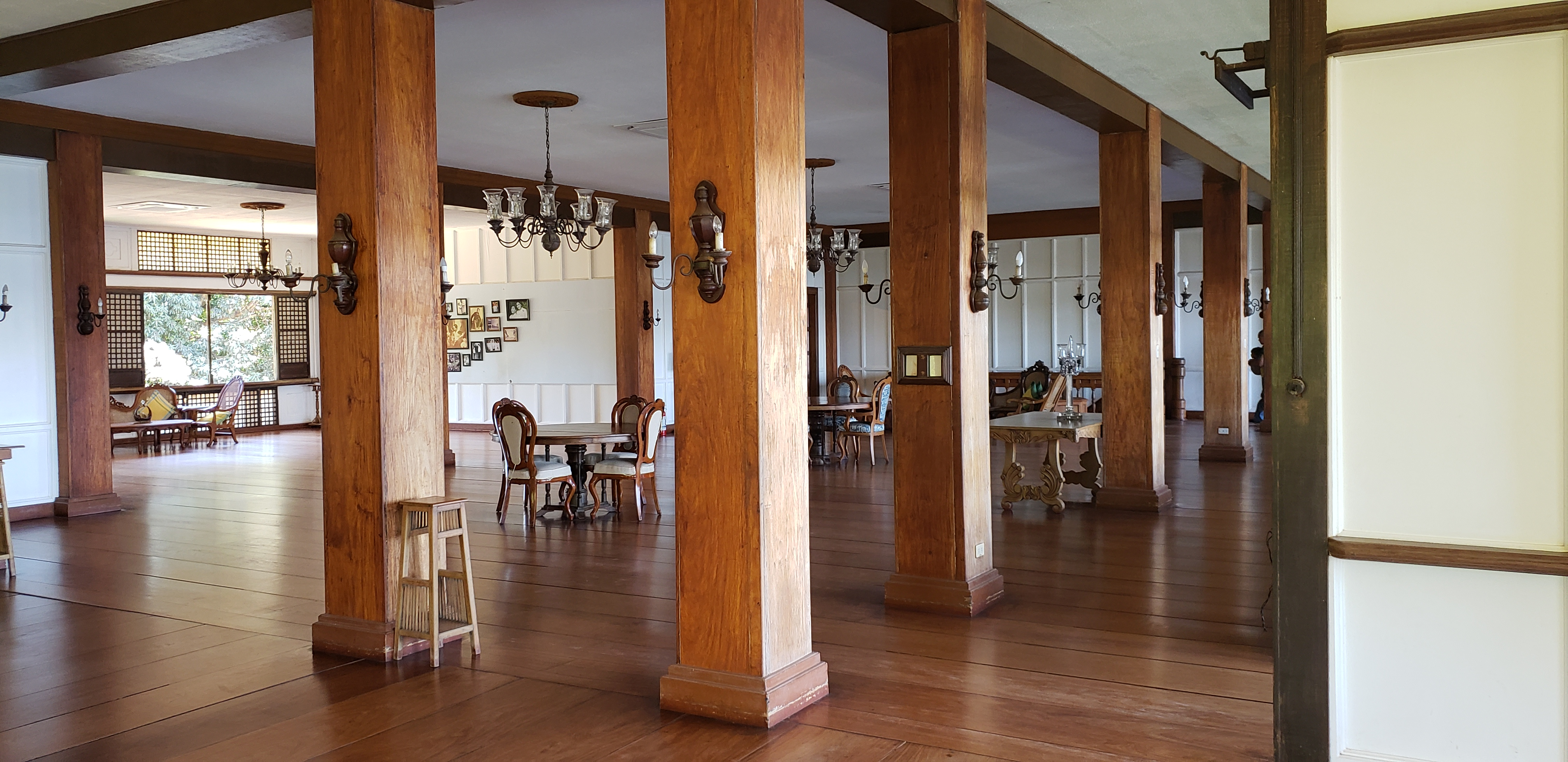
ground floor (left) and second floor (right)

== Gallery ==
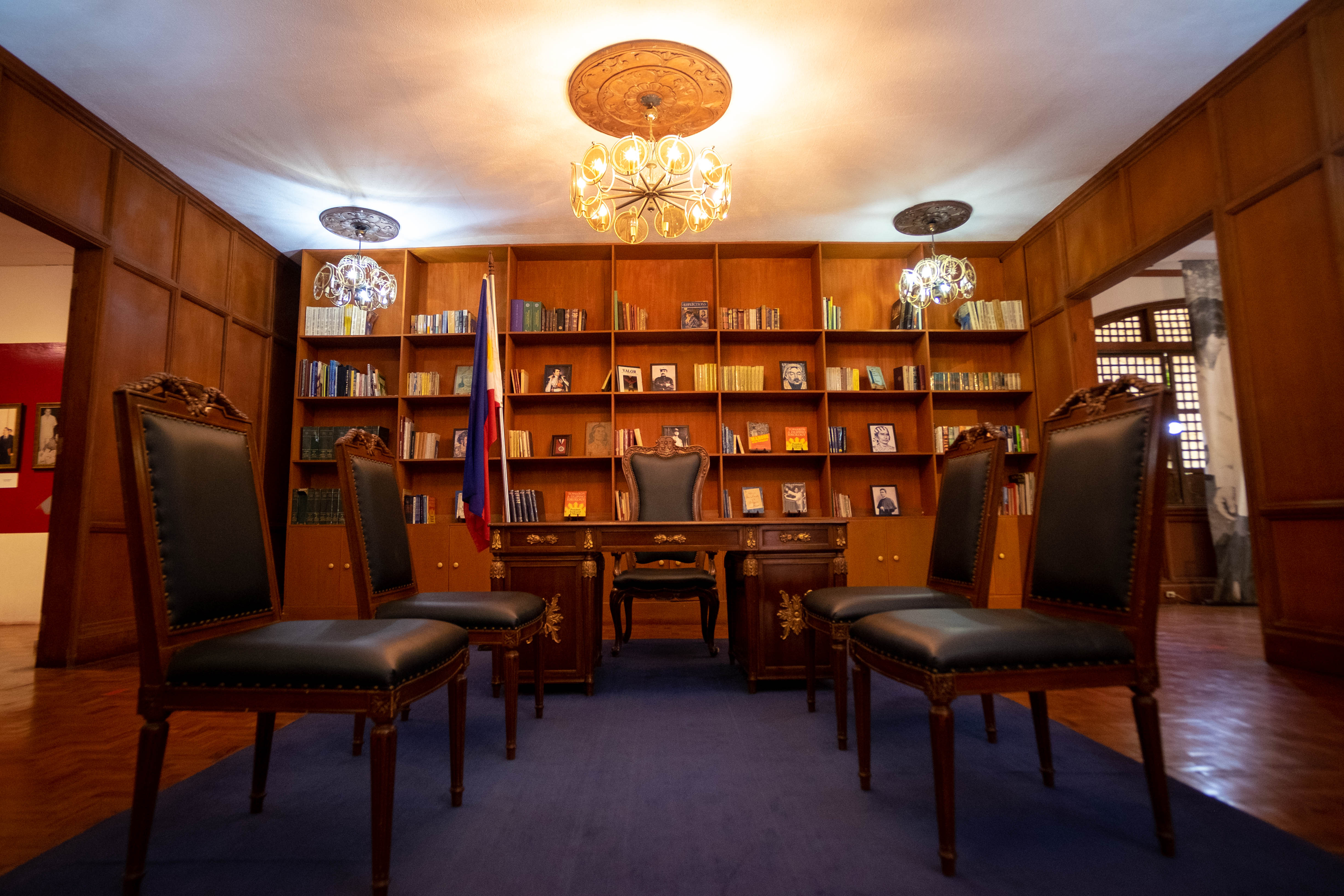
Study room

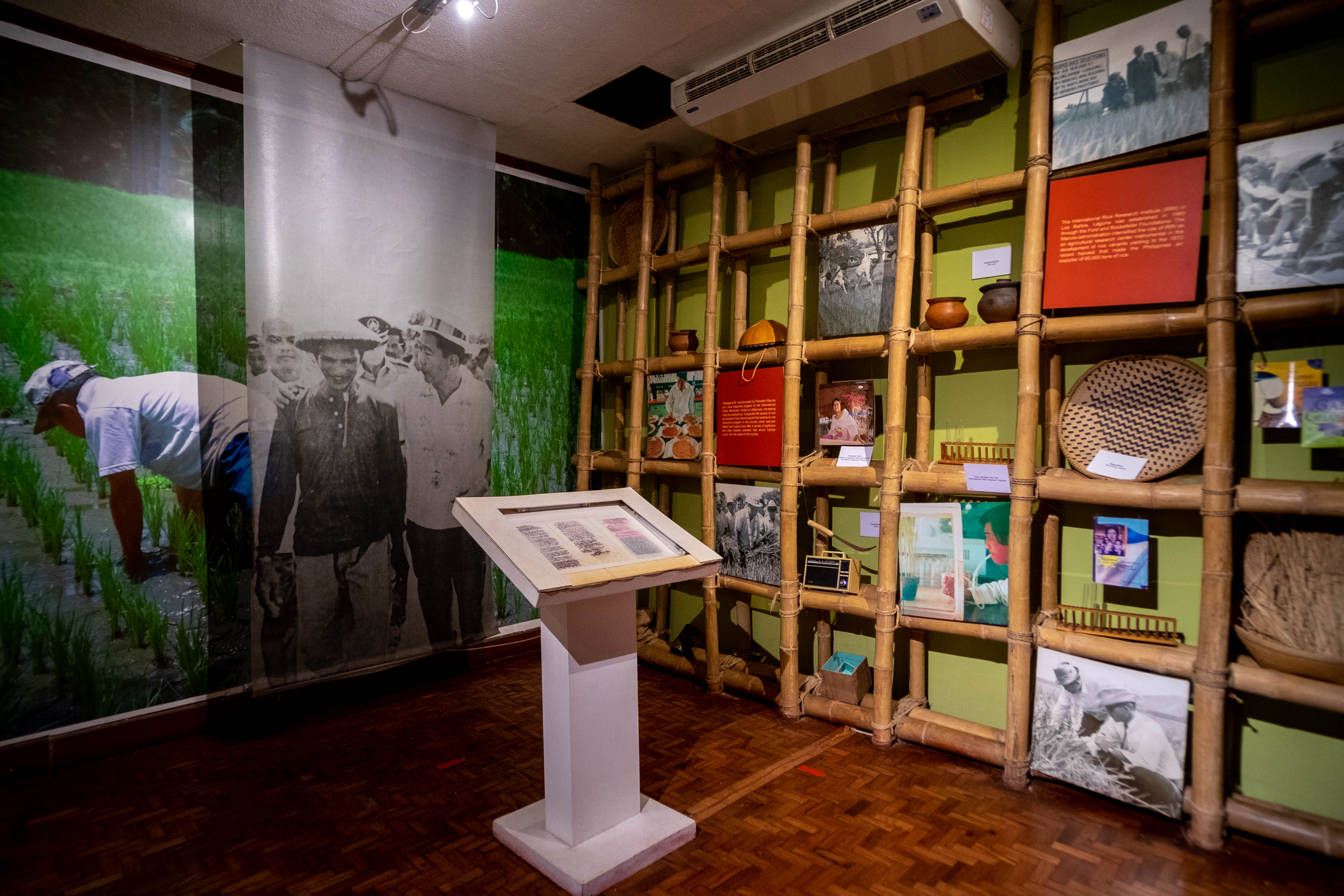
Agricultural room

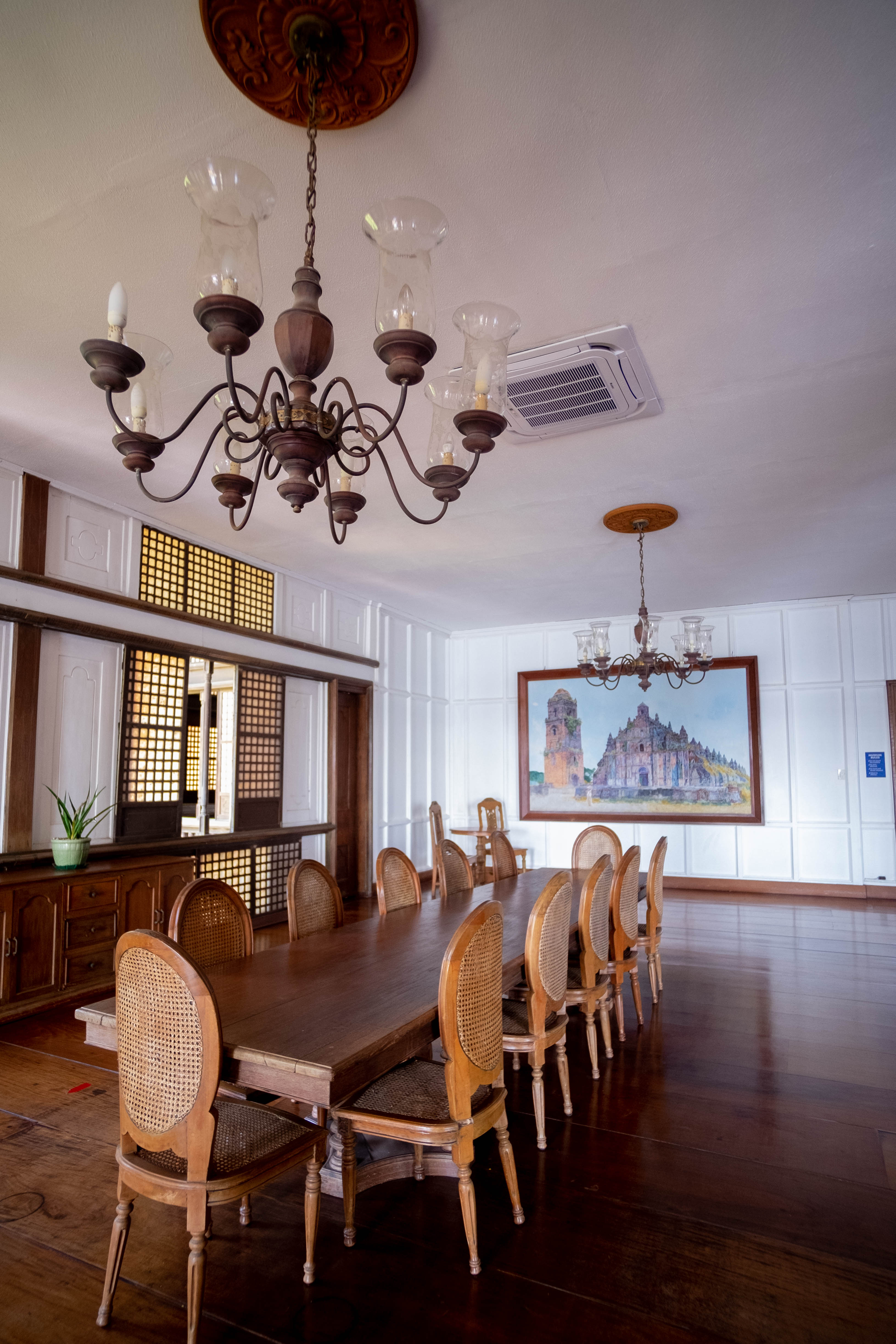
Family room

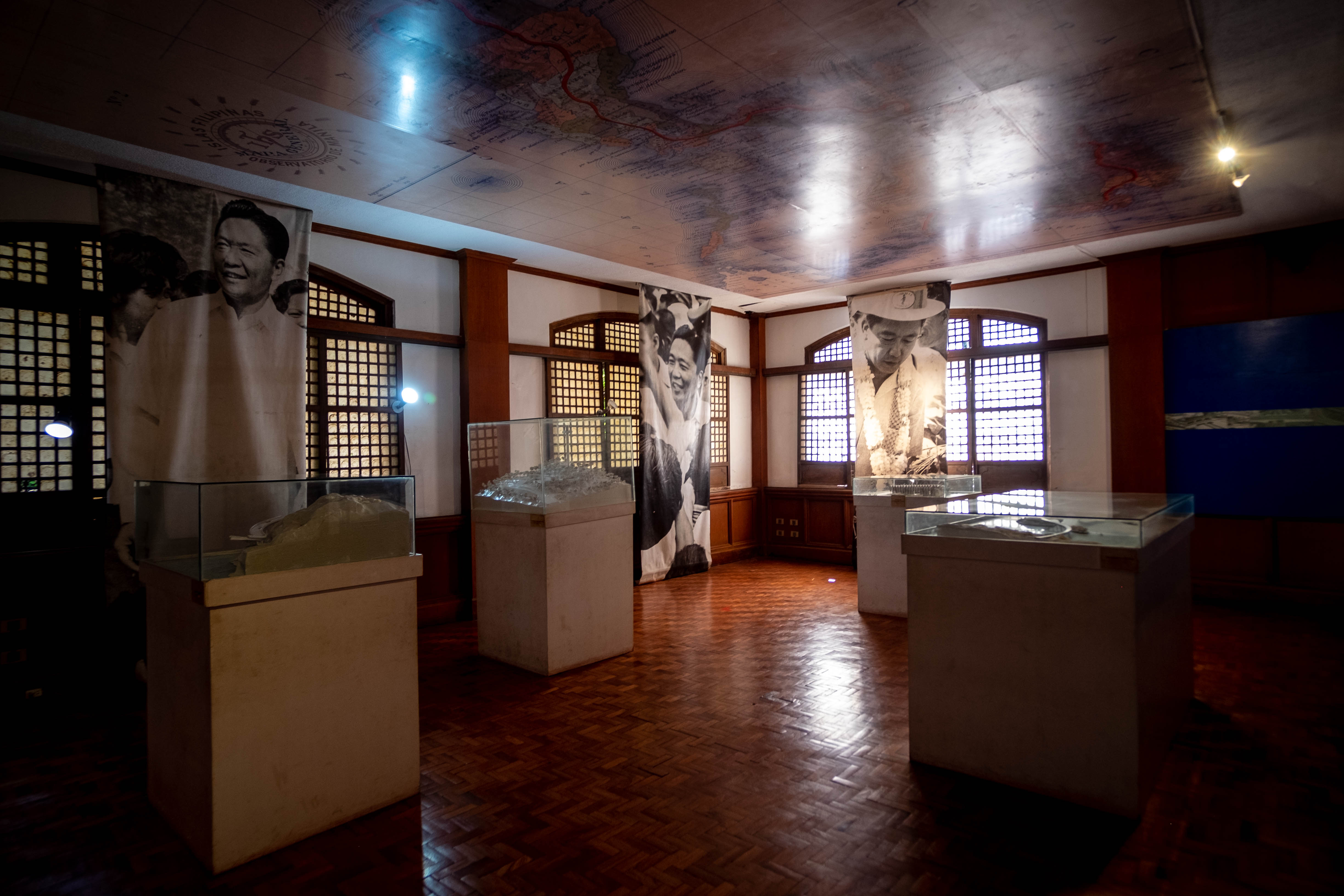
Nation building room

== See also ==
- Malacañang Palace in Manila, the presidential palace which this property was named after
- Malacañang sa Sugbo in Cebu City, now disused presidential residence
- Malacañang of the South in Davao City, former presidential residence
- The Mansion, Baguio, the official summer residence of the president of the Philippines
