= Santo Niño Shrine and Heritage Museum =

Museum in Tacloban, Philippines

- Location: Tacloban, Philippines
- Coordinates: 11°14′08.9″N 125°00′08.0″E
- Visitors: 20,000 (2018 )
- Owner: Presidential Commission on Good Government

The Santo Niño Shrine and Heritage Museum, colloquially referred to as the Imelda Marcos Museum, is a building in Tacloban, the Philippines. It was formerly owned by the Marcos family and now houses a museum.

It was built from 1979 to 1981 by then-First Lady and wife of President Ferdinand Marcos, Imelda Marcos. It was among the 20 presidential palaces built during the Martial law era. The property was sequestered by the Philippine government as part of a campaign to recover the Marcos family's ill-gotten wealth. The former residential building was converted to a museum under the management of the Presidential Commission on Good Government and features the collection of Imelda Marcos, as well as artifacts related to the Santo Niño, the city's patron saint.

In 2013, the museum was damaged by Typhoon Haiyan (Yolanda). It was later renovated.

== See also ==
- People's Park in the Sky
