= Canlubang Golf & Country Club =

Golf course in the Philippines

Club information
- Location: Brgy. Canlubang, Calamba and Casile, Cabuyao, Laguna, Philippines
- Established: 1977 (completion)
- Type: Private
- Tota holes: 36
- Greens: Grass
- Website: http://www.canlubanggolfandcountryclub.com

Canlubang Golf & Country Club, often referred to as Can Golf, is located in Luzon, Philippines, in the Barangay Casile area of Cabuyao, Laguna.

Historically, the area was part of a large sugarcane plantation owned by José Yulo, a known politician and landowner in the mid-20th century. The club occupies part of this land, later transforming it into a golfing venue.

Canlubang Golf & Country Club features two 18-hole courses. Together, these courses offer a total of 36 holes.

== See also ==
- Canlubang Sugar Barons
- Matang Tubig
