= Marcos jewels =

Jewelry collection

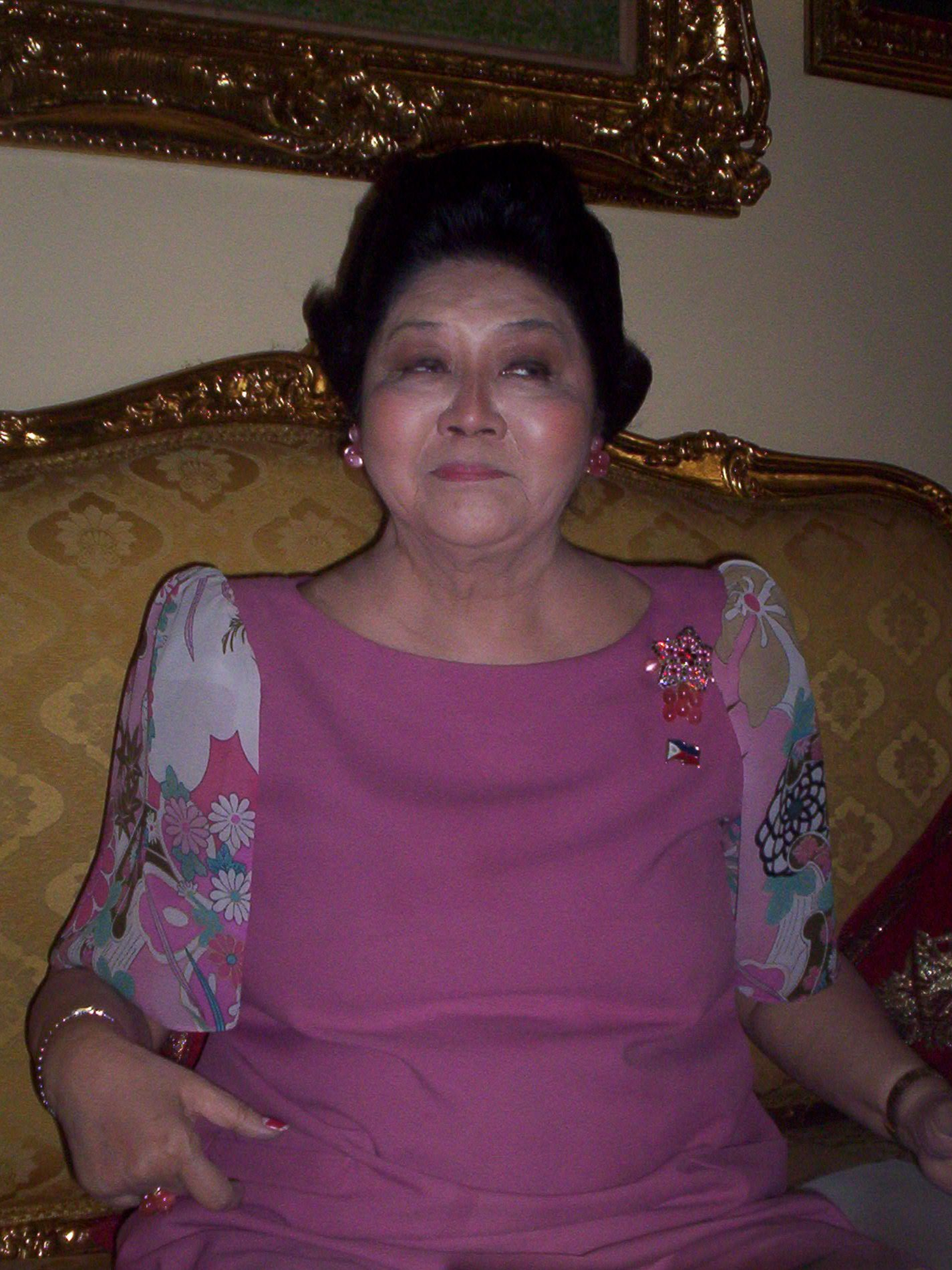
Imelda Marcos in 2008

The Marcos jewels (sometimes also the Imelda jewels) generally refers to the jewelry collection of the Marcos family – most famously that of former First Lady Imelda Marcos. However, it also specifically refers to three collections of jewelry which were recovered by the Presidential Commission on Good Government (PCGG) in 1986, which the Philippine Supreme Court had ruled to be part of the Marcoses' unlawful wealth.

The three collections of jewels sequestered by the PCGG have been come to be called the "Hawaii collection", the "Malacañang collection", and the "Roumeliotes collection". The "Hawaii collection" refers to a group of jewels seized by the US Bureau of Customs from the Marcoses when they went into exile in Hawaii in 1986. The "Malacañang collection" refers to a group of jewels which were discovered in Malacañang Palace after the Marcoses fled the Philippines. The "Roumeliotes collection" refers to a group of jewels which were confiscated from Demetriou Roumeliotes, said to have been a close associate of Imelda Marcos, after he was caught trying to smuggle them out of the Philippines at Manila International Airport.

In February 2016, the government of the Philippines announced that the three collections had been appraised at ₱1 Billion (about $21 million), and that they would eventually be auctioned off after having been kept unsold by the government for three decades.

== Unlawful wealth ==
The Philippine Supreme Court considers the Marcos jewels part of the unlawful holdings of the Marcos family, based on the definitions set forth in Republic Act 1379, which was passed in 1955. The Supreme Court's interpretation of R.A. 1379 says that property acquired by a public officer or employee which is "manifestly out of proportion to his salary as such public officer and to his other lawful income" is "presumed prima facie to have been unlawfully acquired". The bulk of the assets of the Marcoses, including the Marcos jewels, were treated as unlawful in a 2012 decision which specified that "according to the Official Report of the Minister of Budget, the total salaries of former President Marcos as President from 1966 to 1976 was ₱60,000 a year and from 1977 to 1985, ₱100,000 a year; while that of the former First Lady, Imelda R. Marcos, as Minister of Human Settlements from June 1976 to February 22–25, 1986 was ₱75,000 a year" – about $304,372.43.

== Collections ==
=== Malacañang collection ===
When the Marcoses were ousted from power by the EDSA People Power revolution, they were forced to leave Malacañang Palace very quickly in the early morning of February 25, 1986, leaving behind "a horde of treasures including 15 mink coats, 508 couture gowns, 888 handbags and, most famously, 3,000 pairs of designer shoes". Also left behind was a significant amount of jewelry including "well-set semi-precious stones made into belts, brooches, and earrings; white diamonds in gold tiaras; pink diamonds in gold bracelets; and diamond in gold buckle". This jewelry collection was placed in the vaults of the Philippines' central bank, and eventually came to be known as the "Malacañang collection".

Consisting of about 400 pieces, the Malacañang collection is made up of smaller, less expensive jewelry compared to the Hawaii and Roumeliotes collections, and was estimated by the Sandiganbayan (anti-graft court) to be worth $110,055 to $153,089 in 2017.

In January 2014, the Sandiganbayan had promulgated a decision declaring the jewelry collection to be ill-gotten. Imelda Marcos and her daughter Irene Marcos-Araneta petitioned the Supreme Court to reverse the ruling, but the court determined in a 2017 decision that the women had "failed to satisfactorily show that the properties were lawfully acquired; hence, the prima facie presumption that they were unlawfully acquired prevails".

=== Hawaii collection ===
Of greater value than the collection of jewels left behind in Malacañang Palace was the collection the Marcoses attempted to bring along when they went into exile. Confiscated by the United States Customs Service when the Marcoses arrived at Hickam Air Force Base in Hawaii on February 26, 1986, this jewelry collection took US customs officials about a month to document, and was initially appraised at $5 million to $10 million.

In 1991, Imelda Marcos entered into a settlement deal with the Philippine government regarding the Hawaii collection, surrendering it in exchange for the dropping of specific lawsuits which the government had raised against the Marcos family. The collection was eventually turned over to the PCGG, which put it in safekeeping at the Bangko Sentral ng Pilipinas (BSP) just like the Malacañang collection.

The jewelry pieces included in the Hawaii collection have been the subject of numerous public exhibits – notably a public exhibit titled "A Story of Excesses: What Could Have Fuelled a Nation’s Development" by the PCGG in 2016, and "The Collection of Jane Ryan & William Saunders", an exhibit of 3D replicas of some of the jewelry pieces from the Hawaii collection, by Filipino artist Pio Abad and British jewelry-maker Frances Wadsworth Jones.

=== Roumeliotes collection ===
A third collection of Marcos jewels was seized when the Greek national Demetriou Roumeliotes attempted to bring them out of the Philippines at Manila International Airport on March 1, 1986. The last of the three collections to be sequestered, it was also the last to be legally forfeited in favor of the Philippine government. The Sandiganbayan ruled in 2014 that the jewels would be forfeited in favour of the Philippines' Bureau of Customs, because the attempt to smuggle them out of the country was a violation of the Tariff and Customs Code.

Although it consists of only 60 pieces, the Roumeliotes collection is considered the most valuable among the three collections.

== Proposed auctions ==
Several proposals to auction off the Marcos jewels have been made since 2014, by which date the Philippine courts forfeited all of the collections in favor of the Philippine government. There have been several delays, however, including an appeal of the Sandiganbayan decision by Imelda Marcos and her daughter Irene Marcos Araneta over the forfeiture of the Malacañang collection. The Philippine Supreme Court upheld the forfeiture, denying the Marcoses' appeal in January 2017.

President Rodrigo Duterte on June 4, 2019, ordered the PCGG to auction the ₱700 million worth of Imelda Marcos jewelry collections, although as of June 1, 2022, an auction date has yet to be announced.

== See also ==
- Marcos mansions
- Edifice complex
- Overseas landholdings of the Marcos family
- Presidential Commission on Good Government
- Unexplained wealth of the Marcos family
