= Opinion polling for the 2025 Philippine Senate election =

This article covers opinion polling for the 2025 Philippine Senate election.

Leading up to the 2025 Philippine Senate election, the polling companies Social Weather Stations (SWS), Pulse Asia, OCTA Research, and others are conducting opinion polls. These polls collect data on the way that people are intending to vote in the election.

Those who win outright are in bold. Those that are within the margin of error are in italics.

== Polling for Senate elections ==
Pollsters usually do face-to-face interviews with respondents. They sometimes present respondents with a mock ballot on which the respondent will mark their choices for the Senate. The Senate of the Philippines is elected via multiple non-transferable vote on an at-large basis, where a voter has 12 votes, cannot transfer any of the votes to a candidate, and can vote for up to twelve candidates. If the mock ballot has 13 or more preferences, the pollster classifies it as "invalid."

Aside from publishing preferences per candidate, pollsters also include other data such as averages on how many candidates the respondents included in their preferences.

== Calendar ==
- Filing of candidacies: October 1 to 8, 2024
- Deadline in substituting a candidate for it to appear on the ballot: October 8, 2024
- Campaign period for nationally elected positions: February 11 to May 10, 2025
- Campaign period for locally elected positions: March 28 to May 10, 2025
- Election day: May 12, 2025

== Survey details ==
Date/s administered	Pollster	Sample size	Margin of error	Issues when poll was administered
May 6–9, 2025	Pulse Asia	1,200	±2.8%	
May 2–6, 2025	SWS	1,800	±2.31%	
May 1, 2025	Publicus Asia	3,000	±2.0%	
Apr 28–May 3, 2025	The Center	1,800	±3.0%	
Apr 26–May 1, 2025	Arkipelago Analytics	1,400	±3.0%	
Apr 23–30, 2025	WR Numero	2,413	±2.0%	
Apr 20–24, 2025	OCTA	1,200	±2.0%	
Apr 20–24, 2025	Pulse Asia	2,400	±2.0%	
Apr 12–14, 2025	DZRH	7,508	±1.13%	
Apr 11–15, 2025	The Center	1,200	±3.5%	
Apr 11–15, 2025	SWS	1,800	±2.31%	
Apr 10–16, 2025	OCTA	1,200	±3.0%	
Apr 7–12, 2025	Arkipelago Analytics	670	±3.79%	
Mar 31–Apr 7, 2025	WR Numero	1,834	±2.0%	
Mar 23–29, 2025	Pulse Asia	2,400	±2.0%	
Mar 22–29, 2025	The Center	1,800	±3.0%	
Mar 18–24, 2025	OCTA	1,200	±3.0%	
Mar 15–21, 2025	Arkipelago Analytics	670	±3.79%	Arrest of Rodrigo Duterte
Mar 15–20, 2025	Publicus Asia	1,500	±3.0%	Arrest of Rodrigo Duterte
Mar 15–20, 2025	SWS	1,800	±2.31%	Arrest of Rodrigo Duterte
Mar 8–10, 2025	DZRH	7,516	±1.13%	
Feb 22–28, 2025	OCTA	1,200	±3.0%	
Feb 20–26, 2025	Pulse Asia	2,400	±2.0%	
Feb 17–22, 2025	The Center	1,200	±3.0%	
Feb 15–19, 2025	SWS	1,800	±2.31%	Impeachment of Sara Duterte
Feb 10–18, 2025	WR Numero	1,814	±2.0%	Impeachment of Sara Duterte
Jan 25–31, 2025	OCTA	1,200	±3.0%	
Jan 18–25, 2025	Pulse Asia	2,400	±2.0%	
Jan 17–20, 2025	SWS	1,800	±2.31%	
Dec 16–22, 2024	RMN–Oculum	1,200	±3.0%	
Dec 12–18, 2024	SWS	2,097	±2.1%	
Dec 7–9, 2024	DZRH	7,510	±1.13%	
Nov 29–Dec 3, 2024	Publicus Asia	1,500	±3.0%	
Nov 26–Dec 3, 2024	Pulse Asia	2,400	±2.0%	
Nov 25–Dec 1, 2024	The Center	1,200	±3.0%	
Nov 10–16, 2024	OCTA	1,200	±3.0%	
Oct 29–31, 2024	Peers Agency	1,800	±2.5%	
Oct 16–17, 2024	Publicus Asia	1,500	±3.0%	
Sep 14–23, 2024	SWS	1,500	±2.5%	
Sep 15–19, 2024	Publicus Asia	1,500	±3.0%	
Sep 6–13, 2024	Pulse Asia	2,400	±2.0%	
Aug 28–Sep 2, 2024	OCTA	1,200	±3.0%	
Jun 26–Jul 1, 2024	OCTA	1,200	±3.0%	
Jun 17–24, 2024	Pulse Asia	2,400	±2.0%	
Mar 14–19, 2024	Publicus Asia	1,500	±3.0%	
Mar 11–14, 2024	OCTA	1,200	±3.0%	
Mar 6–10, 2024	Pulse Asia	1,200	±2.8%	
Feb 21–29, 2024	Oculum	3,000	±2.0%	
Dec 10–14, 2023	OCTA	1,200	±3.0%	
Sep 30–Oct 4, 2023	OCTA	1,200	±3.0%	
Jul 17–31, 2023	Oculum	1,200	±3.0%	
Apr 15–18, 2023	SWS	1,200	±3.0%	

== Per candidate ==
=== By voter preferences ===
==== Until election day ====
Candidate	Party	Mar 31–Apr 7, 2025 WR Numero	Apr 7–12, 2025 Arkipelago Analytics	Apr 10–16, 2025 OCTA	Apr 11–15, 2025 SWS	Apr 11–15, 2025 The Center	Apr 12–14, 2025 DZRH	Apr 20–24, 2025 OCTA	Apr 20–24, 2025 Pulse Asia	Apr 23–30, 2025 WR Numero	Apr 26–May 1, 2025 Arkipelago Analytics	Apr 28–May 3, 2025 The Center	May 1, 2025 Publicus Asia	May 2–6, 2025 SWS
Benhur Abalos	ABP (PFP)	18.2%	22%	28.8%	18%	23%	25.8%	28.5%	22.9%	20.7%	21%	23%	15%	24%
Jerome Adonis	Makabayan	1.3%	–	–	2%	–	1.5%	0.7%	0.4%	–	–	–	2%	1%
Wilson Amad	Independent	2.7%	–	–	2%	–	1.1%	–	1.3%	–	–	–	1%	1%
Jocelyn Andamo	Makabayan	1.0%	–	–	2%	–	1.0%	–	0.5%	–	–	–	2%	1%
Bam Aquino	KiBam (KANP)	**26.4%**	30.5%	**32.3%**	21%	20%	31.1%	**31.4%**	25.4%	**28.5%**	**33.5%**	20.7%	**41%**	23%
Ronnel Arambulo	Makabayan	2.5%	–	–	2%	–	1.6%	0.7%	0.5%	–	–	–	5%	2%
Ernesto Arellano	Katipunan	2.4%	–	1.0%	3%	–	2.5%	1.3%	1.0%	–	–	–	3%	2%
Roberto Ballon	Independent	0.9%	–	–	2%	–	1.2%	–	0.2%	–	–	–	3%	2%
Abby Binay	ABP (NPC)	**31.8%**	**37%**	**35.7%**	**29%**	**40.7%**	**33.9%**	**37.6%**	**30.2%**	**31.7%**	32%	**43%**	18%	**31%**
Jimmy Bondoc	DuterTen (PDP)	15.1%	30%	13.2%	9%	21%	23.9%	19.7%	16.6%	14.7%	29%	31%	17%	11%
Ramon Bong Revilla	ABP (Lakas)	**27.4%**	**40.5%**	**38.7%**	**31%**	25%	**34.3%**	**38.1%**	**35.6%**	**29.5%**	**39%**	27%	11%	**29%**
Bonifacio Bosita	Independent	15.5%	17%	11.5%	11%	19%	18.5%	11.7%	14.3%	15.8%	17%	20%	11%	16%
Arlene Brosas	Makabayan	1.6%	–	1.1%	2%	–	2.4%	0.7%	0.8%	–	–	–	6%	2%
Roy Cabonegro	DPP	0.8%	–	–	1%	–	1.2%	–	0.2%	–	–	–	1%	1%
Allen Capuyan	PPP	1.3%	–	–	1%	–	1.4%	0.6%	1.5%	–	–	–	2%	2%
Teddy Casiño	Makabayan	3.6%	–	3.3%	3%	7%	4.4%	1.7%	1.5%	–	–	9%	11%	3%
France Castro	Makabayan	3.8%	–	3.2%	4%	7%	3.4%	1.0%	2.4%	–	–	8%	9%	3%
Pia Cayetano	ABP (NP)	**34.7%**	**43%**	**39.5%**	**33%**	**44.5%**	**36.3%**	**39.1%**	**29.9%**	**36.6%**	**41%**	**45.7%**	**28%**	**30%**
Angelo de Alban	Independent	1.9%	–	–	2%	–	2.0%	–	1.4%	–	–	–	4%	2%
David D'Angelo	Bunyog	1.3%	–	–	1%	–	1.3%	–	0.6%	–	–	–	2%	1%
Leody de Guzman	PLM	4.2%	–	3.3%	3%	6%	4.0%	1.6%	1.9%	–	–	7%	12%	3%
Bato dela Rosa	DuterTen (PDP)	**38.7%**	**49%**	**40.4%**	**32%**	**46%**	**50.7%**	**40.8%**	**41.0%**	**36.8%**	**47%**	**49.3%**	**32%**	**31%**
Mimi Doringo	Makabayan	0.6%	–	–	2%	–	1.1%	–	0.8%	–	–	–	2%	2%
Arnel Escobal	Maharlika	1.8%	–	–	2%	–	1.6%	2.3%	0.7%	–	–	–	1%	2%
Luke Espiritu	PLM	4.4%	–	3.8%	3%	9%	5.2%	1.4%	3.1%	–	–	10%	15%	3%
Mody Floranda	Makabayan	1.5%	–	–	2%	–	1.1%	–	0.3%	–	–	–	2%	2%
Marc Gamboa	Independent	1.9%	–	–	2%	–	1.9%	4.0%	0.7%	–	–	–	2%	1%
Bong Go	DuterTen (PDP)	**41.9%**	**64%**	**64.2%**	**45%**	**57%**	**63.2%**	**56.8%**	**62.2%**	**45.3%**	**63%**	**59%**	**42%**	**43%**
Norberto Gonzales	PDSP	3.4%	–	–	2%	–	2.6%	2.2%	1.0%	–	–	–	4%	2%
Jesus Hinlo Jr.	DuterTen (PDP)	8.7%	16%	8.3%	6%	9%	15.4%	14.0%	11.8%	–	16%	12%	10%	6%
Gregorio Honasan	Reform PH	15.2%	27%	14.8%	13%	29.6%	19.8%	21.2%	12.9%	16.1%	27%	34%	15%	14%
Relly Jose Jr.	KBL	1.9%	–	–	1%	–	1.0%	–	0.5%	–	–	–	2%	1%
Panfilo Lacson	ABP (ind)	**34.1%**	**38%**	**39.7%**	**26%**	**36%**	**42.9%**	**34.3%**	**33.8%**	**33.8%**	32%	**38%**	**32%**	**32%**
Raul Lambino	DuterTen (PDP)	9.0%	20%	10.0%	8%	12%	20.0%	14.8%	13.4%	–	20%	15%	10%	8%
Lito Lapid	ABP (NPC)	**34.1%**	**41%**	**36.9%**	**34%**	**32%**	**38.9%**	**35.6%**	**32.2%**	**34.8%**	**38.7%**	30%	14%	**34%**
Amirah Lidasan	Makabayan	1.3%	12%	–	1%	–	1.7%	–	0.8%	–	12%	–	2%	1%
Rodante Marcoleta	DuterTen (Independent)	17.7%	32.7%	19.3%	13%	30.5%	30.0%	27.8%	23.0%	20.4%	**34%**	**35%**	**23%**	17%
Imee Marcos	Nacionalista	19.5%	33%	27.9%	24%	**35.8%**	31.7%	28.9%	24.7%	26.4%	33%	**39.9%**	**23%**	**29%**
Norman Marquez	Independent	2.3%	–	1.1%	2%	–	2.0%	–	0.8%	–	–	–	5%	2%
Eric Martinez	Independent	2.6%	–	1.2%	3%	–	1.4%	–	0.9%	–	5%	–	3%	3%
Richard Mata	DuterTen (Independent)	5.1%	16.5%	4.2%	3%	14%	6.6%	4.4%	5.9%	–	16.5%	15%	10%	4%
Sonny Matula	WPP	1.7%	–	1.1%	2%	–	2.5%	0.6%	0.5%	–	–	12%	7%	2%
Liza Maza	Makabayan	0.9%	–	–	2%	–	1.7%	–	0.9%	–	–	–	6%	1%
Heidi Mendoza	Independent	5.3%	–	9.2%	6%	18%	5.9%	2.8%	4.1%	–	–	20%	20%	4%
Jose Montemayor Jr.	Independent	2.4%	–	–	2%	–	1.8%	–	0.3%	–	–	–	3%	1%
Subair Mustapha	WPP	0.4%	–	–	1%	–	1.7%	–	1.4%	–	–	–	1%	1%
Jose Jessie Olivar	Independent	0.5%	–	–	1%	–	1.1%	–	0.2%	–	–	–	2%	1%
Manny Pacquiao	ABP (PFP)	24.2%	35%	30.3%	**25%**	23%	30.2%	29.1%	28.3%	26.1%	32%	23.4%	**22%**	24%
Kiko Pangilinan	KiBam (LP)	25.2%	29%	30.3%	21%	16%	26.1%	26.3%	19.8%	24.5%	29%	17%	**36%**	21%
Ariel Querubin	Nacionalista	7.2%	–	3.6%	5%	12%	7.7%	5.5%	4.4%	–	–	13%	8%	5%
Apollo Quiboloy	DuterTen (Independent)	11.0%	–	8.2%	6%	12%	13.9%	7.9%	10.3%	–	10.5%	15%	8%	8%
Danilo Ramos	Makabayan	3.5%	–	1.3%	2%	–	2.7%	0.6%	1.1%	–	–	–	6%	2%
Willie Revillame	Independent	19.2%	**39%**	29.0%	24%	27%	25.7%	30.4%	**28.6%**	22.6%	**38%**	33.5%	14%	24%
Vic Rodriguez	DuterTen (Independent)	12.8%	20%	12.5%	7%	17%	15.0%	10.7%	11.5%	–	20%	18%	17%	8%
Nur-Ana Sahidulla	Independent	0.6%	11%	–	1%	–	1.7%	1.8%	1.7%	–	11%	–	2%	1%
Phillip Salvador	DuterTen (PDP)	20.4%	31%	24.4%	18%	22%	27.9%	25.3%	23.7%	17.2%	32%	23%	14%	16%
Tito Sotto	ABP (NPC)	**29.8%**	**44%**	**43.3%**	**33%**	**54.3%**	**41.8%**	**42.3%**	**41.1%**	**37%**	**42%**	**54%**	**28%**	**37%**
Michael Tapado	Maharlika	1.0%	–	–	2%	–	0.9%	–	0.6%	–	–	–	1%	2%
Francis Tolentino	ABP (PFP)	9.7%	21%	27.7%	12%	**37.5%**	18.7%	25.2%	15.7%	14.2%	20.5%	**42.7%**	21%	15%
Ben Tulfo	Independent	**32.1%**	**42%**	**45.4%**	**31%**	**39%**	**40.1%**	**40.2%**	**33.5%**	**35.2%**	**42%**	**39%**	**23%**	**34%**
Erwin Tulfo	ABP (Lakas)	**43.4%**	**55%**	**61.2%**	**43%**	**44%**	**50.4%**	**52.7%**	**42.4%**	**48.7%**	**55%**	**47.6%**	**28%**	**45%**
Mar Valbuena Jr.	Independent	1.3%	–	–	1%	–	1.5%	–	1.3%	–	–	–	2%	1%
Leandro Verceles Jr.	Independent	0.4%	–	–	0.4%	–	0.8%	–	0.9%	–	–	–	2%	0.3%
Camille Villar	ABP (NP)	**26.7%**	**38.5%**	**30.4%**	**28%**	**37.9%**	**39.5%**	**31.9%**	28.3%	**29.8%**	**40.5%**	**40%**	17%	**30%**
Stray votes (Note: Wilbert Lee and Willie Ong withdrew their candidacy in February 2025.)		16.5%			15%		14.7%		8.0%	17.9%				15%
Undecided					1%									1%
Refused									7.2%					
None									1.8%				6%	

==== Until campaigning for locally-elected positions ====
Candidate	Party	Feb 15–19, 2025 SWS	Feb 17–22, 2025 The Center	Feb 20–26, 2025 Pulse Asia	Feb 22–28, 2025 OCTA	Mar 8–10, 2025 DZRH	Mar 15–20, 2025 SWS	Mar 15–20, 2025 Publicus Asia	Mar 15–21, 2025 Arkipelago Analytics	Mar 18–24, 2025 OCTA	Mar 22–29, 2025 The Center	Mar 23–29, 2025 Pulse Asia
Benhur Abalos	ABP (PFP)	17%	21%	23.0%	36%	27.5%	17%	13%	23.9%	29%	23%	20.3%
Jerome Adonis	Makabayan	1%	–	0.3%	–	2.0%	1%	–	1.1%	–	–	0.4%
Wilson Amad	Independent	1%	–	0.2%	–	1.5%	1%	–	2.1%	–	–	0.5%
Jocelyn Andamo	Makabayan	1%	–	0.2%	–	2.0%	1%	–	1.6%	–	–	0.1%
Bam Aquino	KiBam (KANP)	16%	16%	26.4%	27%	33.5%	21%	**33%**	27.7%	28%	24.7%	28.6%
Ronnel Arambulo	Makabayan	1%	–	0.3%	–	1.6%	2%	–	1.1%	1%	–	0.4%
Ernesto Arellano	Katipunan	2%	–	0.8%	1%	2.5%	2%	–	5.7%	1%	–	1.0%
Roberto Ballon	Independent	2%	–	0.2%	1%	1.6%	1%	–	2.1%	1%	–	0.7%
Abby Binay	ABP (NPC)	**30%**	**35.5%**	**37.6%**	**43%**	**37.8%**	**27%**	17%	**38.4%**	**37%**	**38.7%**	**35.3%**
Jimmy Bondoc	PDP	7%	11%	11.8%	9%	15.6%	9%	18%	29.5%	19%	16.3%	20.4%
Ramon Bong Revilla	ABP (Lakas)	**33%**	**45.7%**	**46.1%**	**51%**	**36.8%**	**32%**	12%	**46.0%**	**45%**	**42.5%**	**36.9%**
Bonifacio Bosita	Independent	10%	14.5%	11.3%	12%	18.2%	12%	13%	17.1%	16%	17.8%	16.7%
Arlene Brosas	Makabayan	2%	–	0.4%	–	3.0%	1%	–	1.8%	1%	–	0.7%
Roy Cabonegro	DPP	1%	–	0.2%	–	1.0%	1%	–	1.6%	–	–	0.0%
Allen Capuyan	PPP	1%	–	1.1%	–	1.6%	1%	–	–	–	–	0.5%
Teddy Casiño	Makabayan	3%	4%	1.9%	2%	4.7%	3%	–	3.8%	2%	7%	1.6%
France Castro	Makabayan	5%	–	1.6%	2%	4.2%	4%	–	1.5%	1%	–	2.0%
Pia Cayetano	ABP (NP)	**33%**	**41%**	**37.5%**	**39%**	**40.9%**	**31%**	**27%**	**48.0%**	**41%**	**47%**	**37.5%**
Angelo de Alban	Independent	3%	–	0.4%	–	1.5%	2%	–	2.5%	–	–	0.8%
David D'Angelo	Bunyog	1%	–	0.3%	–	1.3%	1%	–	2.1%	–	–	0.1%
Leody de Guzman	PLM	2%	5%	1.8%	1%	3.8%	3%	–	4.4%	1%	7%	2.1%
Bato dela Rosa	PDP	**32%**	**32%**	**44.3%**	35%	**41.4%**	**30%**	**35%**	**48.4%**	**38%**	**35%**	**48.7%**
Mimi Doringo	Makabayan	2%	–	0.4%	–	1.4%	2%	–	2.5%	1%	–	0.1%
Arnel Escobal	Maharlika	2%	–	0.8%	–	2.0%	2%	–	4.0%	1%	–	0.6%
Luke Espiritu	PLM	3%	–	1.3%	1%	5.1%	3%	12%	4.6%	1%	10%	1.9%
Mody Floranda	Makabayan	1%	–	0.1%	–	1.3%	1%	–	–	–	–	0.03%
Marc Gamboa	Independent	2%	–	0.8%	–	1.7%	1%	–	3.5%	–	–	1.2%
Bong Go	PDP	**38%**	**55.3%**	**58.1%**	**62%**	**55.9%**	**42%**	**45%**	**64.1%**	**64%**	**57.6%**	**61.9%**
Norberto Gonzales	PDSP	2%	–	1.1%	–	2.5%	2%	–	5.3%	2%	–	0.6%
Jesus Hinlo Jr.	PDP	4%	–	6.4%	5%	7.0%	5%	–	11.4%	11%	9%	15.5%
Gregorio Honasan	Reform PH	14%	17%	19.7%	24%	20.3%	15%	15%	27.9%	15%	22.7%	18.4%
Relly Jose Jr.	KBL	1%	–	0.0%	–	1.3%	2%	–	0.0%	–	–	0.3%
Panfilo Lacson	ABP (Ind)	**32%**	**46%**	35.8%	38%	**46.4%**	**31%**	**33%**	37.5%	**42%**	**43.3%**	**36.0%**
Raul Lambino	PDP	4%	–	7.0%	5%	11.7%	6%	12%	21.0%	14%	11%	15.2%
Lito Lapid	ABP (NPC)	**36%**	**48.1%**	**39.4%**	**43%**	**40.1%**	**33%**	13%	**38.7%**	**42%**	**46%**	**33.3%**
Amirah Lidasan	Makabayan	1%	–	1.2%	–	2.2%	1%	–	12.1%	1%	–	1.2%
Rodante Marcoleta	Independent	10%	14%	16.1%	16%	20.0%	9%	**21%**	30.0%	20%	18.5%	28.3%
Imee Marcos	ABP (NP)	24%	25%	30.9%	38%	32.2%	19%	17%	29.9%	27%	22.5%	27.6%
Norman Marquez	Independent	2%	–	0.4%	–	2.7%	2%	–	2.5%	–	–	0.4%
Eric Martinez	Independent	2%	–	1.3%	2%	1.8%	3%	–	6.5%	1%	–	1.5%
Richard Mata	Independent	2%	–	2.6%	3%	3.2%	3%	–	13.0%	5%	13%	8.7%
Sonny Matula	WPP	2%	–	0.7%	–	2.7%	2%	–	4.9%	1%	10%	1.6%
Liza Maza	Makabayan	2%	–	0.9%	2%	2.2%	2%	–	5.5%	1%	–	0.9%
Heidi Mendoza	Independent	4%	–	2.0%	2%	5.7%	5%	15%	4.1%	2%	14%	3.6%
Jose Montemayor Jr.	Independent	1%	–	0.6%	–	1.7%	1%	–	3.4%	2%	–	0.6%
Subair Mustapha	WPP	1%	–	1.1%	–	2.0%	2%	–	5.5%	–	–	1.3%
Jose Jessie Olivar	Independent	1%	–	0.5%	–	1.7%	1%	–	1.8%	–	–	0.2%
Manny Pacquiao	ABP (PFP)	**30%**	**35%**	**39.9%**	**40%**	**38.5%**	27%	**21%**	**37.7%**	29%	**31.5%**	**32.0%**
Kiko Pangilinan	KiBam (LP)	22%	19%	25.0%	28%	25.9%	24%	**32%**	25.1%	27%	24%	26.8%
Ariel Querubin	Nacionalista	4%	10.3%	3.7%	5%	5.5%	6%	–	10%	5%	10%	4.7%
Apollo Quiboloy	Independent	4%	7%	6.8%	9%	8.8%	6%	–	7.4%	10%	13%	11.4%
Danilo Ramos	Makabayan	2%	–	0.5%	2%	2.7%	2%	–	2.0%	1%	–	0.7%
Willie Revillame	Independent	**30%**	30%	**42.3%**	**39%**	31.1%	**28%**	13%	**39.5**	29%	30.1%	**35.7%**
Vic Rodriguez	Independent	5%	9%	8.7%	9%	8.2%	7%	15%	17.2%	16%	15.9%	15.8%
Nur-Ana Sahidulla	Independent	2%	–	1.1%	1%	2.2%	1%	–	13.9%	1%	–	1.4%
Phillip Salvador	PDP	14%	14%	20.7%	24%	20.2%	18%	15%	31.5%	22%	19.31%	30.9%
Tito Sotto	ABP (NPC)	**34%**	**56.5%**	**49.0%**	**47%**	**46.4%**	**34%**	**29%**	**49.0%**	**46%**	**56.3%**	**44.2%**
Michael Tapado	Maharlika	2%	–	0.3%	–	1.3%	1%	–	2.5%	1%	–	0.2%
Francis Tolentino	ABP (PFP)	15%	**33.4%**	18.0%	34%	21.0%	13%	**23%**	23.2%	27%	**37.5%**	20.2%
Ben Tulfo	Independent	**34%**	**39.8%**	**40.7%**	**59%**	**43.3%**	**34%**	**22%**	**57.7%**	**48%**	**34.7%**	**35.4%**
Erwin Tulfo	ABP (Lakas)	**45%**	**54%**	**56.6%**	**66%**	**55.7%**	**42%**	**29%**	**59.8%**	**61%**	**51%**	**51.1%**
Mar Valbuena Jr.	Independent	2%	–	0.7%	–	1.4%	2%	–	4.9%	1%	–	0.4%
Leandro Verceles	Independent	1%	–	0.1%	–	1.2%	1%	–	3.1%	–	–	0.2%
Camille Villar	ABP (NP)	29%	29%	**36.6%**	**40%**	**40.6%**	27%	12%	**37.9%**	**35%**	28%	29.0%
Stray votes (Note: Wilbert Lee and Willie Ong withdrew their candidacy in February 2025.)		18%				21.8%	19%					
Undecided		8%		3.4%			7%					2.3%
Refused				1.7%								1.6%
None				2.6%								2.8%

==== Until campaigning for nationally-elected positions ====
Candidate	Party	Oct 16–17, 2024 Publicus Asia	Oct 29–31, 2024 Peers Agency	Nov 10–16, 2024 OCTA	Nov 25–Dec 1, 2024 The Center	Nov 26–Dec 3, 2024 Pulse Asia	Nov 29–Dec 3, 2024 Publicus Asia	Dec 7–9, 2024 DZRH	Dec 12–18, 2024 SWS	Dec 16–22, 2024 RMN–Oculum	Jan 17–20, 2025 SWS	Jan 18–25, 2025 Pulse Asia	Jan 25–31, 2025 OCTA	Feb 10–18, 2025 WR Numero
Benhur Abalos	ABP (PFP)	15%	**30.9%**	**30%**	33.5%	26.0%	16%	31.8%	17%	26.3%	19%	24.8%	**39%**	18.8%
Jerome Adonis	Makabayan	2%	3.2%	–	–	0.5%	–	2.0%	1%	–	2%	1.5%	–	–
Wilson Amad	Independent	–	2.6%	–	–	0.2%	–	1.4%	–	–	2%	0.8%	1%	–
Jocelyn Andamo	Makabayan	–	2.2%	–	–	0.1%	–	1.3%	1%	–	2%	0.4%	–	–
Bam Aquino	KANP	**27%**	**27.6%**	19%	18%	28.2%	**27%**	28.9%	17%	19.6%	20%	27.4%	22%	25.2%
Ronnel Arambulo	Makabayan	2%	3.2%	–	7%	0.4%	–	1.5%	1%	–	2%	0.2%	–	–
Ernesto Arellano	Katipunan	–	5.3%	–	–	1.5%	–	3.7%	2%	–	3%	0.8%	1%	–
Roberto Ballon	Independent	–	2.7%	–	–	0.4%	–	1.9%	–	–	2%	1.2%	1%	–
Abby Binay	ABP (NPC)	19%	**27.6%**	**30%**	32%	**40.1%**	17%	**38.0%**	**25%**	**40.3%**	**31%**	**41.1%**	37%	**32.3%**
Jimmy Bondoc	PDP	8%	8.4%	1%	9%	2.4%	–	7.1%	3%	4.2%	4%	4.6%	4%	10.0%
Ramon Bong Revilla	ABP (Lakas)	17%	**31.6%**	**49%**	**43.5%**	**43.5%**	15%	**42.4%**	**33%**	**49.2%**	29%	**46.0%**	**49%**	**36.1%**
Bonifacio Bosita	Independent	13%	16.1%	8%	14%	12.2%	14%	19.3%	8%	7.1%	11%	12.5%	12%	14.7%
Arlene Brosas	Makabayan	4%	4.8%	1%	7%	0.8%	–	2.8%	1%	–	2%	1.5%	1%	–
Roy Cabonegro	DPP	–	1.2%	–	–	0.1%	–	1.1%	1%	–	1%	0.2%	–	–
Allen Capuyan	PPP	1%	3.4%	–	–	0.9%	–	1.6%	1%	–	1%	1.0%	1%	–
Teddy Casiño	Makabayan	9%	8.7%	4%	10%	2.3%	–	5.1%	2%	–	3%	1.7%	3%	–
France Castro	Makabayan	5%	8.0%	3%	9%	2.2%	–	4.5%	4%	–	5%	1.9%	3%	–
Pia Cayetano	ABP (NP)	**33%**	**45.4%**	**49%**	**44.75%**	**46.5%**	**32%**	**44.7%**	**32%**	**46.9%**	**33%**	**46.1%**	**46%**	**35.8%**
Angelo de Alban	Independent	–	2.5%	–	6%	0.1%	–	1.5%	–	–	2%	0.4%	1%	–
David D'Angelo	Bunyog	–	1.6%	–	–	0.2%	–	1.2%	1%	–	2%	0.5%	–	–
Leody de Guzman	PLM	7%	6.1%	2%	10%	1.8%	–	4.0%	2%	–	3%	2.5%	2%	–
Bato dela Rosa	PDP	**26%**	**31.2%**	26%	**36%**	36.9%	**30%**	**37.4%**	21%	**43.8%**	**30%**	**41.2%**	36%	**29.5%**
Mimi Doringo	Makabayan	1%	2.7%	–	–	0.2%	–	1.6%	0.5%	–	1%	0.5%	–	–
Arnel Escobal	Maharlika	–	3.3%	–	–	0.6%	–	2.2%	1%	–	2%	1.5%	1%	–
Luke Espiritu	PLM	7%	3.9%	2%	–	1.8%	–	3.5%	1%	–	3%	1.3%	2%	–
Mody Floranda	Makabayan	2%	2.3%	–	–	0.1%	–	1.5%	1%	–	1%	0.6%	–	–
Marc Gamboa	Independent	–	4.6%	2%	–	0.9%	–	3.0%	–	–	1%	0.4%	1%	–
Bong Go	PDP	**35%**	**26.9%**	**52%**	**46.5%**	**54.7%**	**37%**	34.5%	**32%**	**44.4%**	**37%**	**50.4%**	**58%**	**30.0%**
Norberto Gonzales	PDSP	5%	5.4%	1%	2%	1.5%	–	3.9%	2%	–	2%	1.6%	1%	–
Jesus Hinlo Jr.	PDP	2%	5.2%	1%	8.5%	0.2%	–	2.6%	1%	–	1%	1.2%	1%	–
Gregorio Honasan	Reform PH	20%	**30.4%**	27%	29%	28.6%	18%	25.3%	15%	28.1%	19%	25.2%	26%	15.8%
Relly Jose Jr.	KBL	–	2.6%	–	5%	0.4%	–	1.6%	–	–	2%	0.5%	–	–
Panfilo Lacson	ABP (ind)	**38%**	**47.6%**	**47%**	**51.75%**	**44.1%**	**39%**	**50.1%**	**27%**	**39.2%**	**35%**	**42.4%**	**48%**	**30.8%**
Raul Lambino	PDP	3%	4.3%	–	3%	0.8%	–	5.3%	1%	–	2%	1.4%	1%	–
Lito Lapid	ABP (NPC)	18%	**28.9%**	**36%**	29%	**39.2%**	17%	**46.2%**	**23%**	31.1%	**37%**	37.7%	**43%**	**37.1%**
Wilbert Lee	Aksyon	4%	4.1%	1%	3%	1.6%	–	3.9%	1%	–	2%	1.0%	1%	–
Amirah Lidasan	Makabayan	2%	1.5%	–	–	0.7%	–	2.3%	0.2%	–	3%	0.7%	–	–
Rodante Marcoleta	Independent	16%	13.4%	8%	23%	10.3%	18%	12.9%	6%	14.0%	7%	12.5%	11%	10.1%
Francis Leo Marcos	Independent	–	–	–	–	–	–	–	–	–	–	–	–	–
Imee Marcos	ABP (NP)	**30%**	**28.1%**	**41%**	**37%**	**37.5%**	**26%**	34.6%	21%	33.3%	28%	**43.3%**	**44%**	20.4%
Norman Marquez	Independent	–	2.7%	–	5%	0.4%	–	2.3%	–	–	1%	0.6%	1%	–
Eric Martinez	Independent	–	6.2%	1%	14.75%	1.9%	–	2.0%	2%	–	2%	1.5%	3%	–
Richard Mata	Independent	6%	4.9%	–	5%	0.7%	–	2.7%	–	–	2%	0.5%	2%	–
Sonny Matula	WPP	4%	2.9%	–	8%	0.8%	–	1.5%	1%	–	2%	0.8%	1%	–
Liza Maza	Makabayan	5%	4.6%	–	10%	1.0%	–	2.6%	1%	–	2%	1.2%	2%	–
Heidi Mendoza	Independent	4%	3.5%	1%	7%	1.0%	–	2.9%	2%	–	3%	1.7%	1%	–
Jose Montemayor Jr.	Independent	4%	3%	2.3%	–	–	0.4%	–	2.2%	–	–	2%	2.2%	1%
Subair Mustapha	WPP	–	–	–	–	–	–	–	–	–	–	–	–	–
Jose Jessie Olivar	Independent	–	2.3%	–	–	0.1%	–	1.6%	–	–	1%	0.5%	1%	–
Willie Ong	Aksyon	**41%**	**39.0%**	22%	33%	20.6%	**39%**	26.6%	14%	22.5%	20%	20.2%	24%	19.3%
Manny Pacquiao	ABP (PFP)	**32%**	**33.6%**	**38%**	**44%**	**45.0%**	**29%**	**46.5%**	**26%**	**46.3%**	**33%**	**40.6%**	**45%**	**26.9%**
Kiko Pangilinan	Liberal	**30%**	**28.6%**	25%	30%	33.1%	**28%**	29.6%	20%	23.3%	29%	29.1%	28%	24.9%
Ariel Querubin	Nacionalista	8%	7.3%	8%	20.75%	6.6%	–	5.0%	2%	–	3%	3.7%	3%	–
Apollo Quiboloy	Independent	6%	6.4%	3%	13%	2.1%	–	4.8%	2%	–	3%	3.0%	5%	–
Danilo Ramos	Makabayan	2%	6.2%	1%	–	0.6%	–	2.2%	2%	–	2%	1.6%	1%	–
Willie Revillame	Independent	21%	**26.8%**	28%	25%	**43.6%**	19%	**39.4%**	**26%**	**36.2%**	29%	**41.9%**	**48%**	**26.5%**
Vic Rodriguez	Independent	7%	4.3%	2%	12%	2.1%	11%	2.3%	3%	–	4%	3.6%	4%	–
Nur-Ana Sahidulla	Independent	2%	2.4%	2%	–	1.7%	–	1.8%	1%	–	2%	0.7%	–	–
Phillip Salvador	PDP	10%	16.4%	15%	19%	16.2%	–	16.9%	10%	12.8%	13%	18.4%	18%	13.7%
Chavit Singson	Independent	16%	18.4%	10%	22.75%	11.5%	14%	17.0%	9%	11.3%	10%	11.4%	–	–
Tito Sotto	ABP (NPC)	**38%**	**46.0%**	**63%**	**53.5%**	**59.2%**	**37%**	**54.9%**	**31%**	**52.3%**	**38%**	**50.2%**	**52%**	**32.4%**
Michael Tapado	Maharlika	–	1.9%	–	–	0.4%	–	1.0%	1%	–	1%	1.5%	–	–
Francis Tolentino	ABP (PFP)	23%	20.4%	**32%**	**43%**	20.2%	**28%**	20.2%	14%	16.3%	13%	19.3%	38%	12.1%
Ben Tulfo	Independent	**33%**	**39.6%**	**66%**	**46.75%**	**52.7%**	**31%**	**50.3%**	**30%**	**50.1%**	**34%**	**46.2%**	**60%**	**32.1%**
Erwin Tulfo	ABP (Lakas)	**40%**	**55.7%**	**73%**	**58%**	**62.2%**	**41%**	**64.7%**	**45%**	**70.8%**	**45%**	**62.8%**	**70%**	**46.5%**
Mar Valbuena Jr.	Independent	–	2.5%	–	–	0.5%	–	1.6%	1%	–	2%	0.7%	–	–
Leandro Verceles	Independent	1%	1.7%	1%	–	0.04%	–	1.0%	1%	–	0.5%	0.1%	–	–
Camille Villar	ABP (NP)	17%	**31.9%**	29%	**38%**	36.5%	16%	**40.7%**	21%	**37.5%**	26%	38.4%	36%	22.3%
Undecided		10%				1.7%			12%		9%	3.1%		
Refused		19%				3.0%						1.7%		
None						2.3%						2.5%		

==== Before filing of candidacies ====
Candidate	Party	Apr 15–18, 2023 SWS	Jul 17–31, 2023 Oculum	Sep 30–Oct 4, 2023 OCTA	Dec 10–14, 2023 OCTA	Feb 21–29, 2024 Oculum	Mar 6–10, 2024 Pulse Asia	Mar 11–14, 2024 OCTA	Mar 14–19, 2024 Publicus Asia	Jun 17–24, 2024 Pulse Asia	Jun 26–Jul 1, 2024 OCTA	Aug 28–Sep 2, 2024 OCTA	Sep 6–13, 2024 Pulse Asia	Sep 15–19, 2024 Publicus Asia	Sep 14–23, 2024 SWS
Benhur Abalos	PFP	8%	–	15%	18%	6%	12.9%	21%	–	10.2%	27%	28%	14.9%	18%	14%
Ernesto Abella	Independent	–	–	–	–	–	0.6%	–	–	0.5%	1%	–	–	–	–
Persida Acosta	Independent	–	–	–	–	7%	8.9%	–	–	6.3%	7%	–	4.4%	–	–
Jerome Adonis	Makabayan	–	–	–	–	–	–	–	–	–	–	–	0.2%	–	1%
Pantaleon Alvarez	Reporma	2%	–	–	–	–	3.3%	–	–	2.0%	–	–	–	–	–
Jocelyn Andamo	Makabayan	–	–	–	–	–	–	–	–	–	–	–	0.2%	–	1%
Bam Aquino	KNP	7%	–	13%	12%	12%	17.3%	7.3%	–	12.5%	10%	14%	19.0%	23%	14%
Ronnel Arambulo	Makabayan	–	–	–	–	–	–	–	–	–	–	–	0.2%	–	1%
Gloria Macapagal Arroyo	Lakas	–	–	–	–	–	–	–	–	–	–	–	–	14%	–
Lorraine Badoy-Partosa	Independent	–	–	–	–	–	0.5%	–	–	0.3%	–	–	0.6%	–	–
Teddy Baguilat	Liberal	2%	–	–	–	3%	0.3%	–	–	–	–	–	–	–	–
Carl Balita	Aksyon	0.5%	–	–	–	–	2.5%	2.6%	–	1.9%	–	–	1.4%	–	–
Ace Barbers	Nacionalista	–	–	–	–	–	–	–	–	–	2%	4%	–	–	–
Herbert Bautista	NPC	8%	14%	10%	12%	16%	11.0%	11.7%	–	13.2%	12%	–	10.8%	–	7%
Greco Belgica	PDDS	1%	–	–	–	–	1.4%	–	–	0.8%	1%	–	0.6%	–	–
Abigail Binay	NPC	–	–	10%	11%	18%	**29.1%**	14.1%	–	18.9%	23%	22%	**37.5%**	15%	**20%**
Jejomar Binay	UNA	**15%**	18%	–	**25%**	–	–	–	–	–	–	–	–	–	–
Jimmy Bondoc	Independent	–	–	–	–	–	0.8%	–	–	–	–	–	–	–	–
Arlene Brosas	Gabriela	–	–	–	–	–	–	–	–	–	–	–	–	–	1%
Jose Calida	Independent	–	–	–	–	–	0.7%	–	–	–	–	–	–	–	–
Teodoro Casiño	Makabayan	–	–	–	–	–	–	–	–	–	–	–	–	–	1%
France Castro	ACT Teachers	–	–	–	–	–	–	–	–	2.0%	1%	2%	1.4%	–	3%
Pia Cayetano	Nacionalista	**23%**	**38%**	**36%**	**30%**	**35%**	**37.7%**	**26%**	**23%**	**42.7%**	**39%**	**35%**	**41.3%**	**27%**	**26%**
Neri Colmenares	Makabayan	4%	–	6%	8%	6%	4.4%	5.4%	–	5.9%	4%	6%	4.2%	–	2%
Dakila Cua	PFP	–	–	–	–	–	–	–	–	0.3%	–	–		–	–
Dingdong Dantes	Independent	–	–	–	–	–	10.4%	–	–	8.1%	11%	10%	9.6%	–	–
Rafaela David	Akbayan	–	–	–	–	–	–	–	–	0.3%	–	–	0.7%	–	–
Noli de Castro	Aksyon	9%	–	19%	12%	–	–	13.7%	–	–	12%	–	–	–	–
Leila de Lima	Liberal	5%	–	6%	7%	10%	9.3%	8.6%	–	–	9%	8%	–	–	–
Arthur Defensor Jr.	PFP	–	–	–	–	–	–	–	–	–	3%	–	–	–	–
Lorenz Defensor	NUP	–	–	–	–	–	–	–	–	5.5%	–	–	–	–	–
Mike Defensor	PFP	–	–	14%	7%	–	8.9%	11.3%	–	–	9%	–	–	–	–
Ronald dela Rosa	PDP	9%	**32%**	**39%**	**47%**	**41%**	**33.2%**	**33%**	**28%**	**31.3%**	**36%**	29%	**26.2%**	26%	18%
Monsour del Rosario	Reporma	2%	–	–	–	7%	–	–	–	–	–	–	–	–	–
Fernando Diaz	PPP	1%	–	–	–	–	–	–	–	0.6%	–	–	–	–	–
Chel Diokno	Akbayan	7%	–	12%	7%	9%	11.2%	7.3%	–	–	6%	7%	7.0%	**28%**	7%
Mimi Doringo	Makabayan	–	–	–	–	–	–	–	–	–	–	–	0.1%	–	1%
Franklin Drilon	Liberal	8%	–	13%	12%	–	16.1%	14.5%	–	15.3%	17%	18%	15.8%	–	12%
Paolo Duterte	HNP	–	–	13%	14%	–	13.1%	15.1%	–	13.8%	15%	20%	16.3%	18%	–
Rodrigo Duterte	PDP	**25%**	**39%**	–	–	**53%**	**47.7%**	**38%**	**38%**	**38.7%**	**33%**	**33%**	**38.0%**	**36%**	**25%**
Sebastian Duterte	PDP	–	–	–	–	–	13.5%	16.8%	–	14.9%	18%	22%	19.1%	18%	–
Guillermo Eleazar	Reporma	7%	–	8%	–	11%	10.4%	4.8%	–	9.8%	4%	–	5.4%	–	–
Luke Espiritu	PLM	1%	–	–	–	–	–	–	–	–	–	–	0.4%	–	–
Ted Failon	Independent	–	–	–	–	–	14.6%	–	–	18.8%	13%	–	12.2%	23%	–
Mody Floranda	Makabayan	–	–	–	–	–	–	–	–	–	–	–	0.4%	–	0.2%
Christina Frasco	Lakas	–	–	–	–	–	–	–	–	2.8%	2%	–	1.6%	–	–
Duke Frasco	NUP	–	–	–	–	–	1.4%	–	–	2.8%	–	–	1.0%	–	–
Larry Gadon	KBL	5%	–	4%	–	6%	4.6%	3.4%	–	3.5%	1%	–	1.9%	–	–
George Garcia	Independent	–	–	–	–	–	0.9%	–	–	–	–	–	–	–	–
Gwendolyn Garcia	One Cebu	4%	–	5%	–	–	5.2%	5.9%	–	–	3%	–	–	–	–
Rex Gatchalian	NPC	10%	–	–	–	–	–	–	–	–	–	–	–	–	–
Bong Go	PDP	**20%**	20%	**49%**	**53%**	**40%**	**44.2%**	**50%**	**32%**	**36.6%**	**45%**	**49%**	**40.3%**	**33%**	18%
Ferdinand Golez	Independent	–	–	–	–	–	0.6%	–	–	–	1%	–	–	–	–
Richard Gomez	PFP	7%	–	14%	11%	–	11.6%	12.7%	–	9.9%	8%	9%	9.5%	–	–
Aurelio Gonzales Jr.	Lakas	–	–	–	–	–	–	–	–	0.9%	–	–	–	–	–
Dick Gordon	Bagumbayan	6%	12%	16%	14%	13%	14.8%	17.6%	–	12.0%	15%	18%	17.3%	–	10%
Samira Gutoc	Aksyon	1%	–	–	–	–	–	2.1%	–	–	2%	–	–	–	–
Barry Gutierrez	Akbayan	–	–	–	–	–	–	–	–	0.9%	–	–	1.5%	–	–
Gregorio Honasan	Reform PH	10%	19%	19%	18%	23%	17.5%	17.6%	–	18.6%	17%	23%	21.5%	–	13%
Edwin Jubahib	PFP	0.5%	–	–	–	–	–	–	–	–	–	–	–	–	–
Lorna Kapunan	Aksyon	–	–	–	–	–	–	–	–	3.4%	–	–	2.9%	–	–
Panfilo Lacson	Independent	**16%**	**31%**	**32%**	**32%**	**32%**	28.6%	**34%**	**32%**	**32.2%**	**34%**	**44%**	**35.5%**	**29%**	**24%**
Rey Langit	PDP	1%	–	–	–	–	1.3%	1.7%	–	–	1%	–	–	–	–
Lito Lapid	NPC	**17%**	**26%**	**26%**	20%	30%	25.4%	22%	–	21.4%	28%	**33%**	**24.7%**	16%	**20%**
Wilbert Lee	Aksyon	–	–	–	–	–	0.4%	–	–	1.4%	–	14%	1.1%	–	–
Ronald Llamas	Akbayan	–	–	–	–	–	–	–	–	0.6%	–	–	0.1%	–	–
Benjamin Magalong	NPC	–	–	–	–	2%	3.1%	–	–	2.1%	–	–	2.4%	–	–
Hermilando Mandanas	PDP	–	–	2%	–	–	0.6%	2.1%	–	1.2%	–	–	0.6%	–	–
Rodante Marcoleta	PDP	3%	–	8%	–	4%	2.4%	2.2%	–	4.3%	3%	6%	3.3%	15%	–
Liza Araneta Marcos	Independent	–	–	–	–	6%	6.0%	–	–	–	–	–	–	–	–
Imee Marcos	Nacionalista	**18%**	20%	**39%**	**42%**	**35%**	**32.1%**	**29%**	**27%**	**33.8%**	28%	**33%**	**29.8%**	**29%**	**25%**
Eric Martinez	PDP	–	–	–	–	–	0.8%	–	–	–	–	–	–	–	–
Richard Mata	Independent	–	–	–	–	–	0.4%	–	–	–	1%	–	–	–	–
Sonny Matula	WPP	1%	–	–	–	–	–	–	–	–	–	–	–	–	–
Liza Maza	Gabriela	–	–	–	–	–	–	–	–	–	–	–	0.1%	–	1%
Cesar Montano	Independent	–	–	–	–	–	8.4%	–	–	7.1%	6%	7%	5.2%	–	–
Isko Moreno	Aksyon	**14%**	20%	**35%**	**32%**	**45%**	**31.5%**	**27%**	**27%**	**31.7%**	23%	–	–	–	–
Ariel Nepomuceno	Independent	–	–	–	–	–	0.3%	–	–	–	–	–	–	–	–
Victor Neri	Independent	–	–	3%	–	–	2.2%	3.8%	–	2.9%	2%	3%	2.3%	–	–
Willie Ong	Aksyon	–	**26%**	21%	17%	**35%**	24.6%	21%	**41%**	18.3%	20%	28%	19.8%	–	–
Serge Osmeña	Independent	6%	–	–	–	–	–	–	–	–	–	–	–	–	–
Manny Pacquiao	PROMDI	**19%**	**24%**	**26%**	**28%**	**43%**	**33.7%**	**32%**	–	**33.5%**	**32%**	**34%**	**31.9%**	**29%**	18%
Salvador Panelo	PDP	2%	–	3%	–	4%	0.8%	2.5%	–	2.4%	–	–	2.5%	–	–
Francis Pangilinan	Liberal	8%	18%	19%	15%	–	22.2%	14.9%	–	19.2%	17%	17%	20.5%	**30%**	15%
Prospero Pichay Jr.	Lakas	–	–	–	–	–	–	–	–	0.9%	–	–	0.9%	–	–
Kathryna Pimentel	PDP	–	–	4%	–	–	5.7%	4.1%	–	–	–	–	–	–	–
Emmanuel Piñol	NPC	2%	–	–	–	–	3.5%	–	–	–	–	–	–	–	–
Ariel Querubin	Nacionalista	–	–	–	–	–	1.0%	–	–	2.8%	3%	5%	2.7%	–	3%
Apollo Quiboloy	Independent	–	–	–	–	–	0.2%	–	–	0.6%	–	–	1.0%	–	–
Danilo Ramos	Makabayan	–	–	–	–	–	–	–	–	–	–	–	0.6%	–	2%
Ralph Recto	Nacionalista	7%	–	14%	15%	16%	18.8%	13.9%	–	15.8%	14%	–	12.5%	–	–
Jesus Crispin Remulla	NUP	1%	–	–	–	2%	3.6%	–	–	–	–	–	–	–	–
Bong Revilla	Lakas	13%	22%	**32%**	**35%**	**32%**	**29.6%**	**30%**	–	**29.9%**	**38%**	**44%**	**35.9%**	14%	**24%**
Willie Revillame	Independent	–	**27%**	13%	18%	29%	25.9%	14.3%	–	–	15%	19%	–	–	–
Leni Robredo	Liberal	10%	17%	15%	17%	23%	13.6%	11.7%	**27%**	–	–	–	–	–	8%
Rufus Rodriguez	CDP	–	–	–	–	–	–	–	–	–	3%	3%	–	–	–
Vic Rodriguez	Independent	–	–	–	–	–	0.9%	–	–	0.4%	1%	2%	1.0%	–	–
Martin Romualdez	Lakas	5%	–	–	–	5%	–	–	–	–	–	–	–	–	–
Yedda Marie Romualdez	Lakas	–	–	–	–	–	1.5%	–	–	2.4%	–	–	4.0%	–	–
Harry Roque	PRP	4%	11%	8%	7%	10%	5.0%	5.8%	–	5.9%	2%	5%	3.6%	–	4%
Mar Roxas	Liberal	10%	19%	11%	15%	–	13.6%	11.7%	–	15.9%	13%	–	9.8%	–	–
Phillip Salvador	PDP	–	–	6%	–	–	3.9%	3.6%	–	5.4%	4%	6%	8.1%	–	7%
Korina Sanchez	Independent	–	–	–	–	–	–	–	–	11.5%	–	–	8.1%	–	–
Vilma Santos	Nacionalista	3%	–	–	–	–	–	–	–	23.6%	–	–	12.1%	–	–
Allen Singson	Independent	–	–	–	–	–	–	–	–	0.7%	–	–	0.6%	–	–
Chavit Singson	NPC	–	–	–	–	–	–	–	–	–	–	6%	6.1%	–	5%
Tito Sotto	NPC	**18%**	**48%**	**42%**	**48%**	**53%**	**51.8%**	**52%**	**32%**	**50.4%**	**44%**	**50%**	**48.0%**	**37%**	**34%**
Vico Sotto	Independent	**18%**	**28%**	–	–	**35%**	–	–	–	–	–	–	–	–	–
Anthony Taberna	Independent	–	–	–	–	–	–	3.7%	–	–	–	–	–	–	–
Gilbert Teodoro	PRP	5%	–	18%	19%	10%	15.2%	12.6%	**26%**	16.8%	14%	–	12.7%	–	7%
Francis Tolentino	Independent	6%	–	**28%**	**33%**	8%	16.7%	22%	–	17.6%	**34%**	**34%**	13.5%	**29%**	14%
Antonio Trillanes	Aksyon	6%	–	10%	11%	15%	13.0%	10.2%	–	–	12%	–	–	–	–
Ben Tulfo	Independent	–	–	–	–	–	**30.5%**	**43%**	–	**40.9%**	**45%**	**57%**	**46.6%**	26%	–
Erwin Tulfo	Lakas	**32%**	**50%**	**60%**	**76%**	**52%**	**57.1%**	**58%**	**37%**	**58.0%**	**58%**	**60%**	**60.8%**	**42%**	**54%**
Luis Raymund Villafuerte	NUP	–	–	2%	–	–	2.8%	2.8%	–	–	–	–	–	–	–
Manny Villar	Nacionalista	–	**26%**	–	–	–	–	–	–	–	–	–	–	–	–
Camille Villar	Nacionalista	6%	–	–	–	8%	–	–	–	–	–	17%	21.0%	13%	**21%**
Don't know		3%		1%			3.5%			2.6%			2.4%		7%
Refused		4%		3%			1.7%			2.1%			1.5%		
None		7%					1.0%			1.9%			3.2%		
Invalid votes (13 or more names)															

== Per party ==
- Parties (excluding independents) with the plurality of seats in boldface.
- Parties (excluding independents) with the majority of seats are shaded by the party color.

=== Seats won ===
- Totals may not add up to 12 due to margin of error.

Date	Pollster	ACT-CIS	Aksyon	KANP	Lakas	LP	NP	NPC	PDP	PFP	PRP	PROMDI	UNA	Ind
2024
Sep 14–23	SWS	1	0	0	1	0	**3**	**3**	3	1	0	1	0	1
Sep 6–13	Pulse Asia	1	0	0	1	0	2	**3**	3	0	0	1	0	2
Aug 28–Sep 2	OCTA	1	1	0	1	0	2	2	3	1	0	1	0	3
Jun 26–Jul 1	OCTA	1	1	0	1	0	2	**3**	3	1	0	1	0	3
Jun 17–24	Pulse Asia	1	1	0	1	0	2	1	3	0	0	1	0	2
Mar 14–19	Publicus Asia	1	2	0	0	1	2	1	3	0	1	1	0	1
Mar 11–14	OCTA	1	2	0	1	0	2	2	3	1	0	1	0	3
Mar 6–10	Pulse Asia	1	2	0	1	0	2	**3**	3	0	0	1	0	3
Feb 21–29	Oculum	1	2	0	1	1	2	2	3	0	0	1	0	3
2023
Dec 10–14	OCTA	1	1	0	1	0	**2**	**2**	2	0	0	1	1	2
Sep 30–Oct 4	OCTA	1	**2**	0	1	0	**2**	**2**	2	0	0	1	0	2
Jul 17–31	Oculum	1	1	0	0	0	**2**	**2**	2	0	0	1	0	3
Apr 15–18	SWS	1	1	0	0	0	**2**	**2**	2	0	0	1	1	2

=== Seats after the election ===
Totals may not add up to 24 due to margin of error.

Date	Pollster	ACT-CIS	Akbayan	Aksyon	KANP	Lakas	LP	NP	NPC	PDP	PFP	PRP	PROMDI	PMP	UNA	Ind
2024
Aug 28–Sep 2	OCTA	1	1	1	0	1	0	3	6	4	1	0	1	1	0	7
Jun 26–Jul 1	OCTA	1	1	1	0	1	0	3	7	4	1	0	1	1	0	7
Jun 17–24	Pulse Asia	1	1	1	0	1	0	3	5	4	0	0	1	1	0	6
Mar 14–19	Publicus Asia	1	1	2	0	0	1	3	5	4	0	1	0	1	0	5
Mar 11–14	OCTA	1	1	2	0	1	0	3	6	4	1	0	1	1	0	7
Mar 6–10	Pulse Asia	1	1	2	0	1	0	3	7	4	0	0	1	1	0	7
Feb 21–29	Oculum	1	1	2	0	1	1	3	6	4	0	0	1	1	0	7
2023
Dec 10–14	OCTA	1	1	1	0	1	0	3	6	3	0	0	1	1	1	6
Sep 30–Oct 4	OCTA	1	1	2	0	1	0	3	6	3	0	0	1	1	0	6
Jul 17–31	Oculum	1	1	1	0	0	0	3	6	3	0	0	1	1	0	7
Apr 15–18	SWS	1	1	1	0	0	0	3	6	3	0	0	1	1	1	6
