= Elmer Labog =

Elmer "Ka Bong" Labog
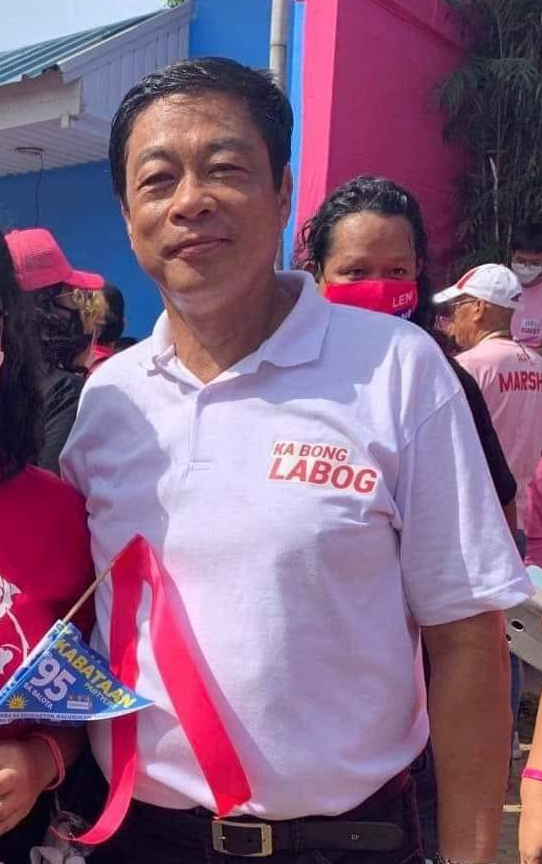
- Labog during the 2022 elections

Chairperson of Kilusang Mayo Uno
- In office 2003 – June 30, 2025
- Preceded by: Crispin Beltran
- Succeeded by: Jerome Adonis

Personal details
- Born: Elmer Calagui Labog; August 3, 1955 (age 71) Bayombong, Nueva Vizcaya, Philippines
- Party: Bagong Alyansang Makabayan
- Other political affiliations: Kilusang Mayo Uno
- Spouse: Marinette Villafuerte Labog
- Education: University of the Philippines Diliman (BS)
- Occupation: Labor leader, activist
- Profession: Bartender

Elmer "Ka Bong" Calagui Labog (born August 3, 1955) is a trade union and labor activist from the Philippines who was the national chairperson of Kilusang Mayo Uno (KMU), the largest trade union in the country from 2003 to 2025. He currently serves as its Chairperson Emeritus. He was also the vice-chairperson of Bagong Alyansang Makabayan and the chairperson of International League of Peoples' Struggle in the Philippines. During the 2022 Philippine Senate election, he ran for senator under Makabayan.

== Early life ==
Labog was born on August 3, 1955, in Bayombong, Nueva Vizcaya. He finished BS Biology in the University of the Philippines Diliman after transferring from BS Forestry from UP Los Baños. He first worked as a bartender at the Manila Hilton Hotel in 1975 in order to aid his studies.

== As labor organizer ==
He first became an activist during the Marcos dictatorship. Preceding this, his political consciousness was shaped by joining youth organizations such as Samahang Demokratiko ng Kabataan (1972) and Student Catholic Action (1972–1973). He became employed in the service industry and became officers of the National Union of Workers in Hotel, Restaurant and Allied Industries in 1977 and the Genuine Labor Organization in Hotel, Restaurant and Allied Industries in 1986.

Labog became a full-time organizer of KMU in 1982 and became its chairperson in 2003. He has become a leader in trade union organizing which struggled for workers' rights which include higher wages, lower prices of commodities, attainment of basic social services, and greater representation in the government. He has been present in many mobilizations that seek to uphold workers' rights. He has also become a major resource speaker and organizer for labor unions around the country. Internationally, he has represented KMU and other Filipino workers in various international conferences. Since the 13th National Congress of the KMU, he has been designated as its chairperson emeritus, with the position of chairperson passing on to Jerome Adonis.

He was head of the labor delegation for the International Labour Organization in 2016. He became head of ILPS Philippines in 2011.

He called for justice of the Bloody Sunday massacre which has also killed trade unionists.

In March 2022, while citing as 'positive development' the minimum wage review of the Department of Labor and Employment, Labog continued to call for a 750 minimum wage. He criticized the Duterte administration for only raising the minimum twice despite the high rate of inflation.

== 2022 Senate Bid ==
Labog ran under the Makabayan Bloc for Senator alongside fellow Makabayan Neri Colmenares. In October 2021, he filed his certificate for candidacy. He was accompanied by Anakpawis former Congressman Ariel Casilao. He said that he would advocate for the rights of workers and farmers, higher and livable wage, and decent housing. He became part of the senatorial line-ups of Leody de Guzman, Manny Pacquiao, and 1Sambayan Coalition.

As a labor organizer, his main advocacy is to have a pro-worker Senate that will uphold the rights of workers in the Philippines. Apart from labor rights, he has been an advocate for other causes such as opposition of death penalty, sufficient government aid and response against COVID-19, SOGIE equality, regaining of ABS-CBN franchise, abolishment of NTF-ELCAC, denouncement of red-tagging, peace talks, and electoral reform.

He was able to garner 1,582,623 votes or 2.82%, placing 42nd.

== Personal life ==
He is married to Marinette Villafuerte Labog.

== See also ==
- Jerome Adonis
