= Jude Fernandez =

Filipino trade unionist (1957–2023)

- Born: Jude Thaddeus Fernandez; October 27, 1957; Pangasinan, Philippines
- Died: September 29, 2023 (aged 65); Binangonan, Rizal, Philippines
- Occupations: Activist, trade unionist
- Spouse: Evelyn Muñoz

Jude Thaddeus Fernandez (born October 27, 1957 – September 29, 2023) was a Filipino trade unionist and prominent social activist from militant labor center Kilusang Mayo Uno (KMU) who organized workers primarily in Central Luzon and Southern Tagalog. On September 29, 2023, he was killed by forces from the Philippine National Police Criminal Investigation and Detection Unit (PNP-CIDG) inside his rented residence in Binangonan, Rizal. Killings of trade unionists under the administration of former President Rodrigo Duterte like those of Fernandez were claimed as major instances of increased and worsened attacks against workers and their rights.

== Early life and activism ==
Fernandez was born on October 27, 1957 in Pangasinan, named after saint Jude Thaddeus. He studied in the University of the Philippines Los Baños from 1974 to 1979 where he studied Bachelor of Science in Agriculture, Major in Sugar Technology. He was an active member of the UP Student Catholic Action in the school.

He became an activist in school during the dictatorial years under the martial law of President Ferdinand Marcos Sr. He organized campaigns, different kinds of protests, and other mass actions that have helped revive organizations, councils, and publications hitherto banned under martial law.

After college, he organized among workers' unions. He organized laborers from Franklin Baker in San Pablo and Sunripe Desiccated Coconut Industry union in Magdalena, Laguna where a June 12, 1980 strike shattered the silence of martial law initially marked by ban on protests and strikes. He joined the KMU in 1989. The 1980 strike spearheaded as an example of genuine, militant, and patriotic unionism in the Southern Tagalog Region.

He was instrumental in organizing multiple worker strikes such as those in 1984, 1987, 1989, and 1990. The 1987 strike pushed the government of former President Corazon Aquino to add ₱10 to the wage while the 1989 strike pushed the government to add ₱25. He became a national organizer of KMU since 2016.

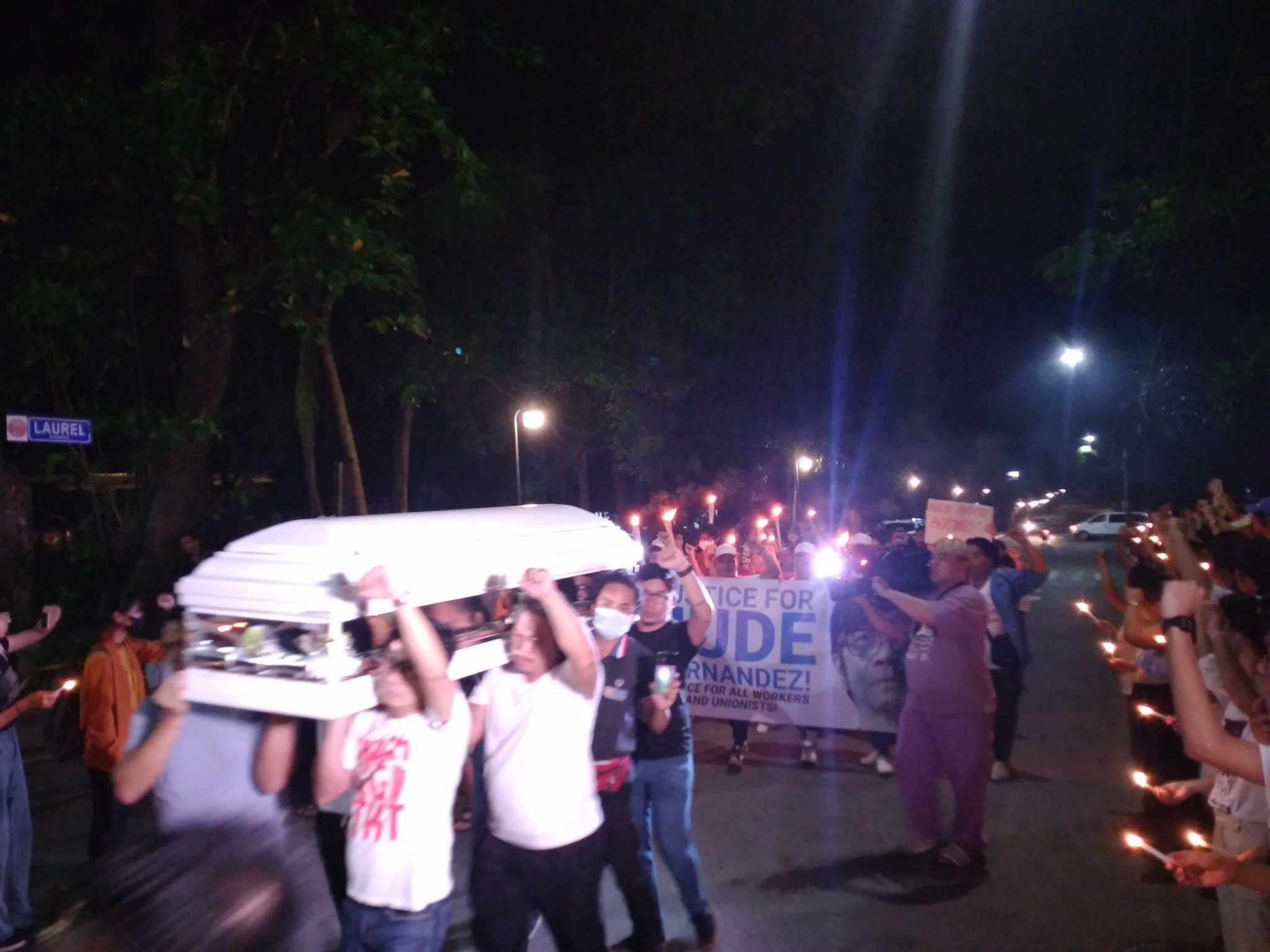
Remains of Fernandez being carried in UP Diliman

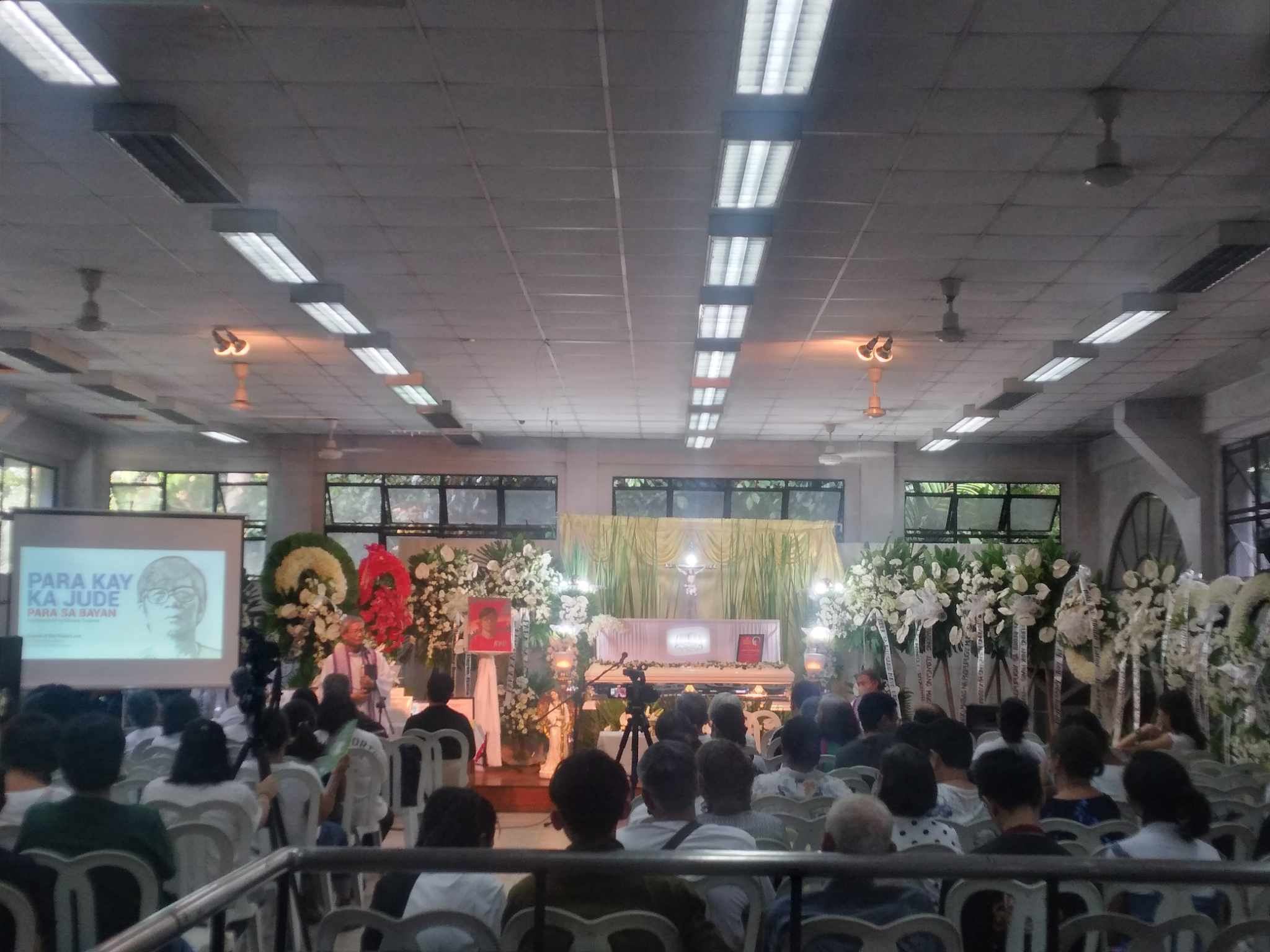
Wake of Fernandez

== Death ==
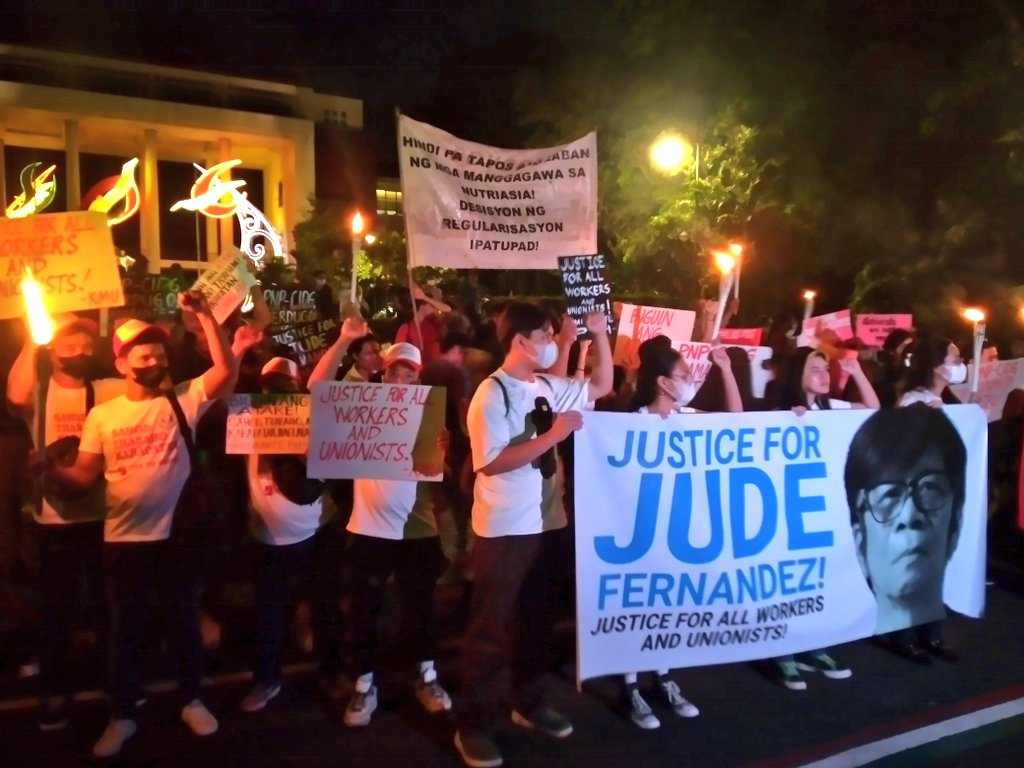

On September 29, 2023, while he was in his rented residence in Binangonan, Rizal, the police showed a warrant and shot him. The police claimed that he fought back and he was declared "dead on the spot." During that time, he was organizing the locality for higher wages and against government corruption.

The police claimed that he resisted arrest and fought back with arms, which the KMU denied based on its fact-finding through the neighbors. According to the investigation joined by KMU, Gabriela Women’s Party representative Arlene Brosas and former Bayan Muna representative Ferdinand Gaite, there were no signs of resistance of Fernandez. His slain body was held back by the PNP and for five days was not recovered by the family and colleagues.

The death of Fernandez was the 72nd killing of laborers during the administration of former President Rodrigo Duterte.

The International Trade Union Confederation has called for a "full and independent investigation." Gabriela condemned the killing and cited the incident as part of the “US-Marcos regime’s whole-of-nation approach which has only led to red-tagging, trumped-up charges, abductions, and killing of civilian advocates.” The Makabayan Bloc filed a resolution calling for an investigation of Fernandez's killing. The Center for Trade Union and Human Rights also condemned the killing.

Multiple protests, like the one on October 9, 2023 in front of PNP Headquarters Camp Crame were launched by KMU and other worker unions.

He is survived by his wife, Evelyn Muñoz, a political prisoner.
