= Kilusang Mayo Uno =

Leftist labor union in the Philippines

KMU
- May First Movement Labor Center
- Kilusang Mayo Uno
- Founded: May 1, 1980; 46 years ago
- Founder: Felixberto Olalia Sr. (founding Chairperson)
- Type: Trade union center
- Headquarters: Quezon City, Metro Manila
- Location: Philippines
- Members: 125,000 (2018)
- Chairperson: Jerome Adonis
- Vice-Chairperson: Florentino Viuya
- Secretary-General: Mary Ann Castillo
- Secessions: Bukluran ng Manggagawang Pilipino
- Affiliations: BAYAN; ITUC; WFTU; IMF; ILPS

Kilusang Mayo Uno (English: May First Movement), also known by its initials KMU is an independent labor center in the Philippines. It promotes "genuine, militant and patriotic trade unionism". The KMU was established on May 1, 1980 to fill a clear need for a workers' organization that would stand for workers' rights and against foreign domination.

The KMU is one of the two primary labor centers alongside the Trade Union Congress of the Philippines. It is a social movement union closely linked with the broader national democratic movement in the Philippines. The organization brands its unionism as "genuine, militant, and nationalist."

The federation started out with seven founding union federations and 50,000 members. By 1990, the KMU reported having as many as 750,000 members affiliated under its unions. In the 1990s the movement separated into several smaller organizations over ideological, political, and organizational differences.

Today, the KMU is organized into eleven national federations and one regional federation with approximately 125,000 affiliate members. KMU also has three affiliate mass organizations, the Pagkakaisa ng mga Samahan ng Tsuper at Operator Nationwide (PISTON, Solidarity of Drivers' and Operators' Organizations Nationwide), Kalipunan ng Damayang Mahihirap (KADAMAY, Federation of Mutual Aid for the Poor), and Migrante Philippines.

== Membership and structure ==
Kilusang Mayo Uno is a federation of trade unions, divided into nine national trade union federations. Additionally, KMU members and unions are organized into workers' alliances and mass organizations. Federations are organized based on general membership but concentrate on one or two particular industries. Local unions and workers can affiliate with a KMU-affiliated federation, or groups of workers looking to organize a local union can directly affiliate with KMU.

In 2018, there are approximately 125,000 KMU affiliated members spread across unions all over the Philippines.

=== Structure ===
The KMU's highest policy making body is its National Congress, which convenes every three years. The National Council acts as the highest authority when Congress is not in session and is composed of the KMU's national officers and federation representatives. The National Executive Committee ensures that plans approved by the Congress and the National Council are implemented.

Although the KMU is structured hierarchically, decisions are as decentralized as possible and decision-making ability is delegated to the lowest possible level of the organization. Local unions are not required to participate in the KMU's major campaigns, although abstention is discouraged.

== History ==
=== Campaigns ===
KMU advocates for an across-the-board-wage increase of ₱125. This campaign was launched in 1999 and in December 2006, the House of Representatives approved House Bill 435 seeking a ₱125 legislated wage hike.

KMU is also leading a campaign against extrajudicial killings. Since 2001, more than 70 unionist and labour activists have been killed by death squads. The union president of Nestlé Philippines and PAMANTIK Chairperson Diosdado Fortuna was amongst the slain. They have also launched an international campaign against political killings and have filed a complaint to the International Labour Organization versus the government of President Gloria Macapagal Arroyo.

They have also an ongoing campaign to boycott Nestlé, whom they accuse of labor rights violations in the company's facilities in Laguna Province.

Previous campaigns include a 2004 transport strike to protest rising oil prices, and a campaign to free then-congressman Crispin Beltran from detention by the Philippine National Police.

In 2020, the movement provided calls for improving Filipino workers' welfare to the government in light of the COVID-19 pandemic in the Philippines.

On April 22, 2022, for the first time since its founding, KMU endorsed candidates in a presidential election: Vice President Leni Robredo and her running mate, Senator Francis Pangilinan.

== Other ==
The movement also calls for the proper funding of basic social services that would ease the pains of a common labourer and the Filipinos in general. Aside from fighting for the rights of workers, KMU has also been an active critic of the palace, citing the Aquino government as a puppet of American imperialism. They have referred to the government's economic policies rather than Typhoon Yolanda as the source of the Philippines' high unemployment rate.

== List of chairpersons ==
- Felixberto Olalia Sr. (1980–1983)
- Rolando Olalia (1983–1986)
- Cipriano Malonzo (acting; 1986)
- Crispin Beltran (1986–2003)
- Elmer Labog (2003–2025)
- Jerome Adonis (2025–present)

== Other notable people ==
- Jude Fernandez
- Emmanuel "Manny" Asuncion
