= KiBam =

2025 Philippine general elections coalition duo

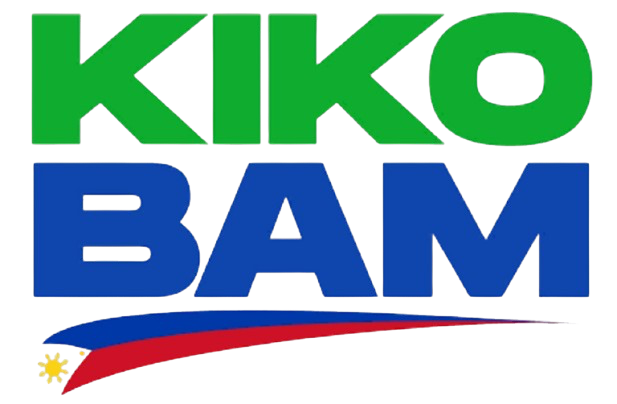
- Co-leaders: Kiko Pangilinan; Bam Aquino
- Campaign manager: Risa Hontiveros
- Founder: Kiko Pangilinan; Bam Aquino
- Founded: November 9, 2024; 23 months ago
- Dissolved: June 30, 2025; 15 months ago
- Preceded by: TRoPa
- Headquarters: Quezon City, Metro Manila
- Ideology: Liberalism (Filipino)
- Coalition members: Akbayan; KANP; Liberal
- Colors: Pink; Green

KiBam, also known as Kiko–Bam, was the umbrella of the opposition-backed candidacies of former senators Kiko Pangilinan and Bam Aquino for the 2025 Philippine Senate election. Led by the Liberal Party, the coalition was formed on November 9, 2024, and includes the Akbayan and Katipunan ng Nagkakaisang Pilipino parties.

Aquino and Pangilinan were both elected, placing second (20.97 million votes) and fifth (15.34 million votes) respectively, despite consistently ranking outside the top 12 in pre-election surveys. Both candidates secured substantial support from vote-rich regions, with Aquino dominating the Lingayen–Lucena corridor, including Calabarzon, Central Luzon, and Metro Manila, while Pangilinan also performed strongly in populous Luzon provinces and major Metro Manila cities, offsetting weaker results in Mindanao.

== Background ==
=== Formation ===
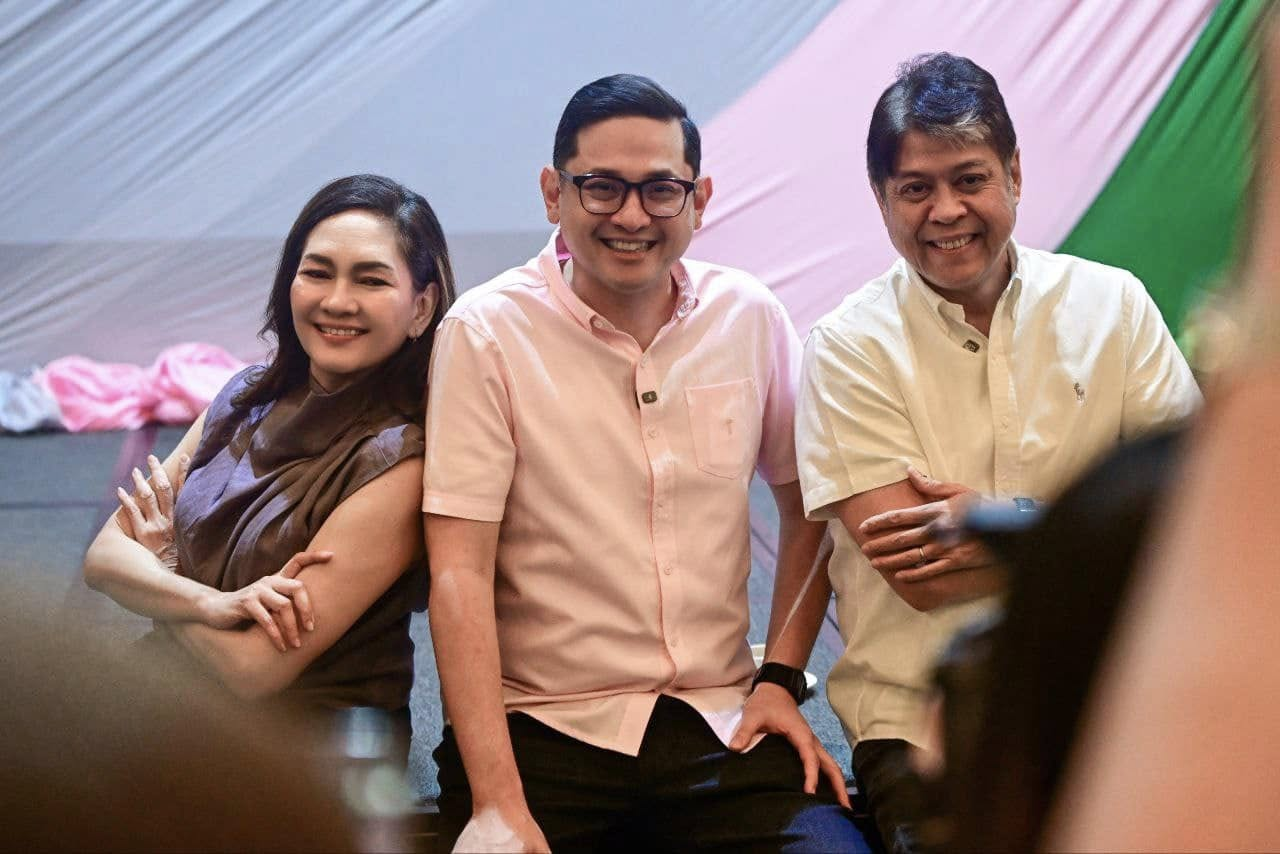
Senator Hontiveros (left) managed the joint campaigns of former senators Aquino (center) and Pangilinan (right).

At a forum of the Foreign Correspondents Association of the Philippines (FOCAP) on February 22, 2024, Liberal Party spokesperson and former senator Leila de Lima announced that the party plans to field former senators Bam Aquino and Kiko Pangilinan, as well as human rights lawyer Chel Diokno of the Katipunan ng Nagkakaisang Pilipino (KANP), as its senatorial candidates in the upcoming election. Aquino confirmed his bid for the Senate on May 14 after being appointed as the chairman of KANP. While former vice president and 2022 presidential candidate Leni Robredo was floated as a possible candidate, Robredo ruled out a bid for the Senate and instead announced a run for the mayoralty of Naga, Camarines Sur, though the party remained keen in drafting Robredo for its Senate ticket.

Former senator Antonio Trillanes, who ran under TRoPa in the 2022 Senate election, proposed that the Liberal Party and its allies "set aside sensitivities for a larger cause" and align with the Marcos administration in the Senate race to ensure "obliteration of the Duterte forces". Then-party president Edcel Lagman was also open to such arrangement. Political pundits suggest that such a coalition would provide the opposition with more resources during the campaign but may alienate "many groups in the opposition camp who are ideologically opposed to any alliance with other political groups". De Lima disapproved of Trillanes' proposal, emphasizing the need to adhere to the party's principles as a political opposition and identity as "the alternative to the Marcos bloc and the Duterte bloc". Senator Risa Hontiveros concurred with de Lima, stating that while she respects Trillanes's proposition, such an alliance would not form a "genuine opposition".

=== Announcement ===
On September 20, the Liberal Party announced Pangilinan's candidacy for senator. Aquino and Pangilinan then launched their "Mga Kaibigan" (Friends) campaign on October 16 at the Bahay ng Alumni at the University of the Philippines Diliman, with Hontiveros serving as their campaign manager. At a campaign event in Bulacan, in November 2024, their campaign adopted the name "KiBam", a portmanteau of their names.

== Coalition members ==
Party	Abbreviation	Ideology	Chairperson	President
Akbayan Citizens' Action Party	Akbayan	Progressivism; Social democracy	Mylene Hega	Rafaela David
Katipunan ng Nagkakaisang Pilipino; Society of United Filipinos	KANP	Youth empowerment	Bam Aquino	Kerby Salazar
Liberal Party	LP / Liberal	Liberalism	Kiko Pangilinan	Erin Tañada (acting)

== Campaign ==
=== Launch and initial activities ===
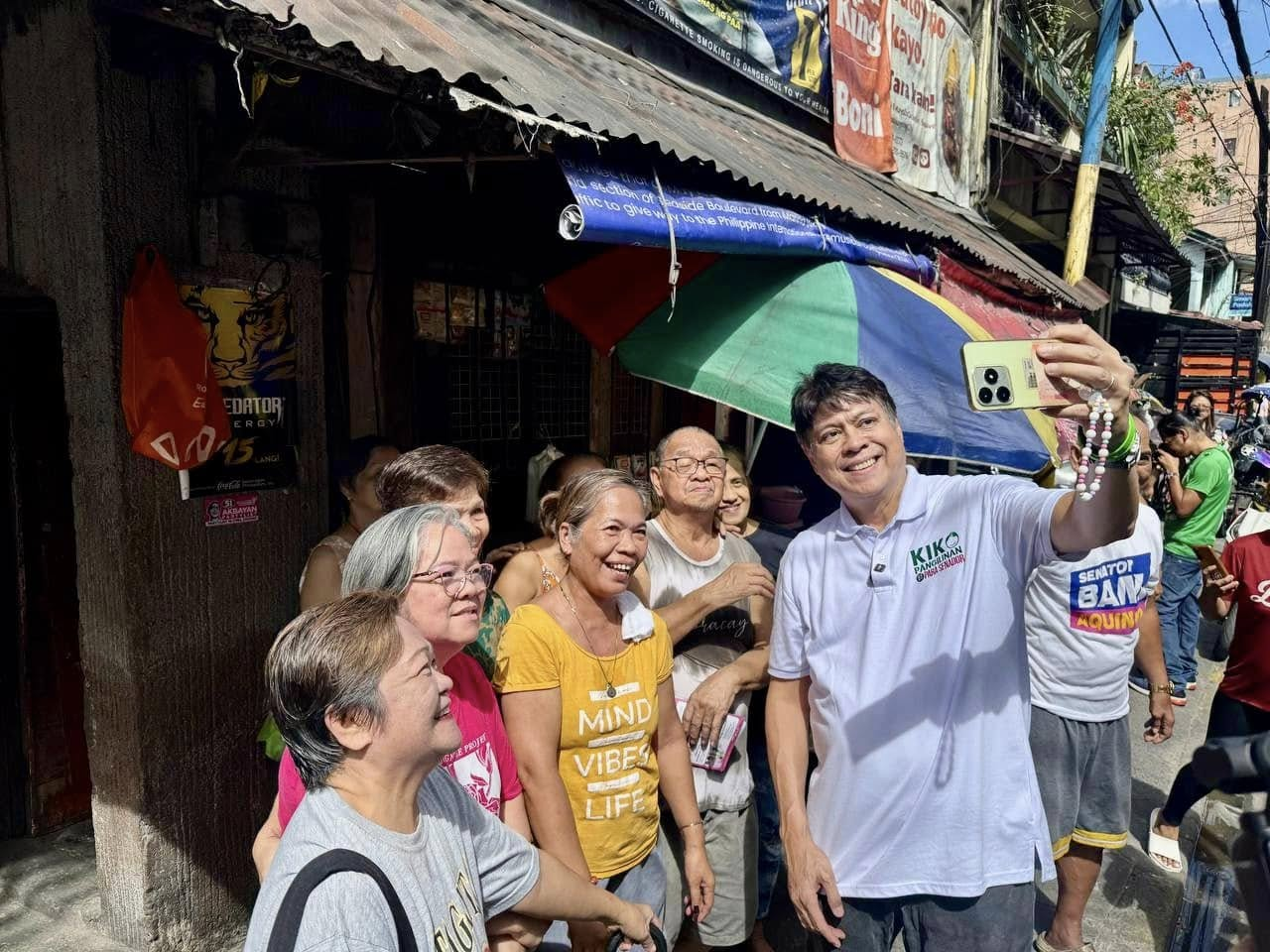
Pangilinan (right) conducting a house-to-house visit in Mandaluyong, March 1, 2025

The campaign officially launched on February 11, 2025, with a morning Mass at the Parish of the Holy Sacrifice, located on the University of the Philippines Diliman campus in Quezon City. The event was attended by key opposition figures, including former vice president Leni Robredo, Akbayan representative Perci Cendaña, and Akbayan representative candidate Chel Diokno.

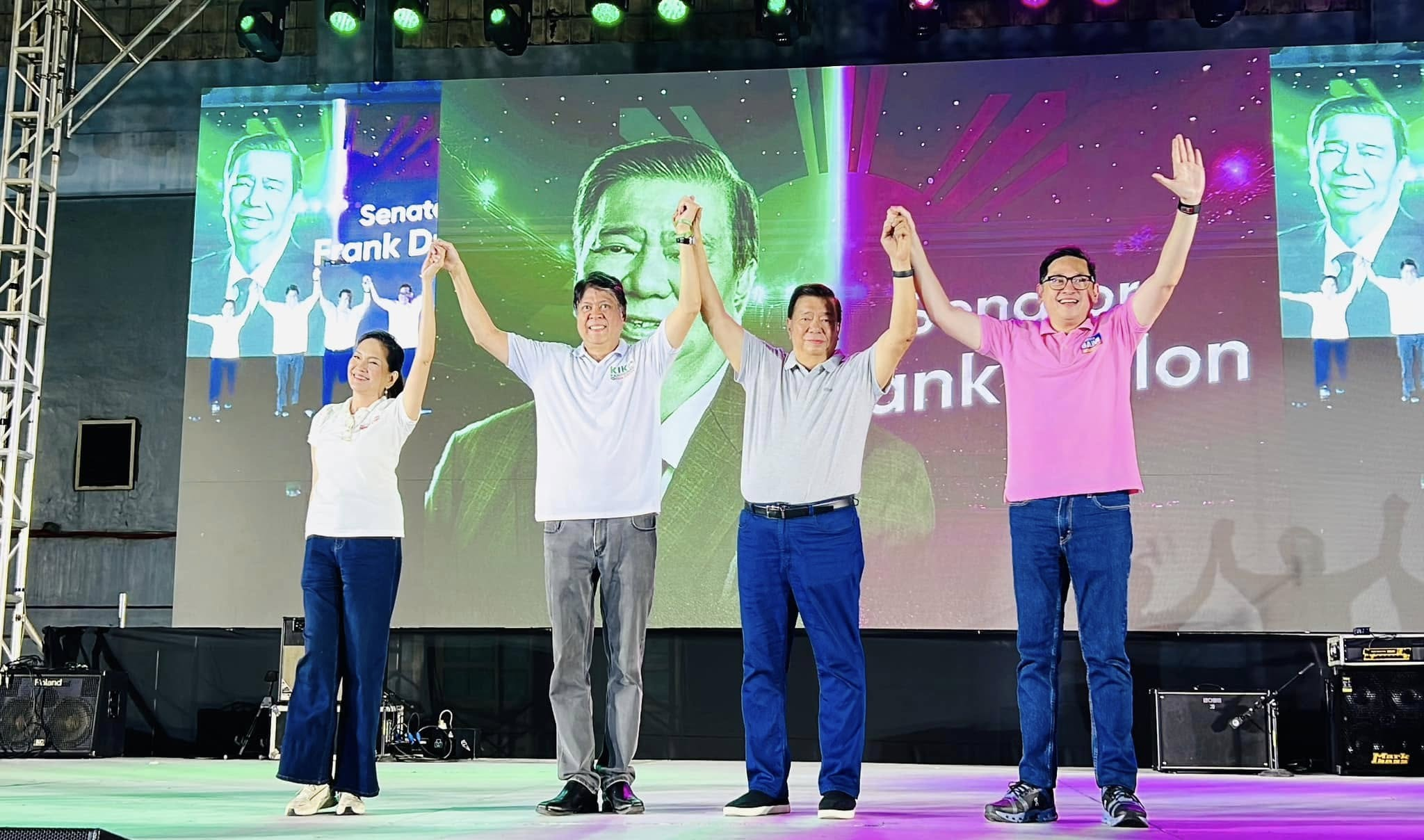
Hontiveros (far left) and Franklin Drilon (second from the right) endorse Pangilinan and Aquino in Iloilo City, March 6, 2025

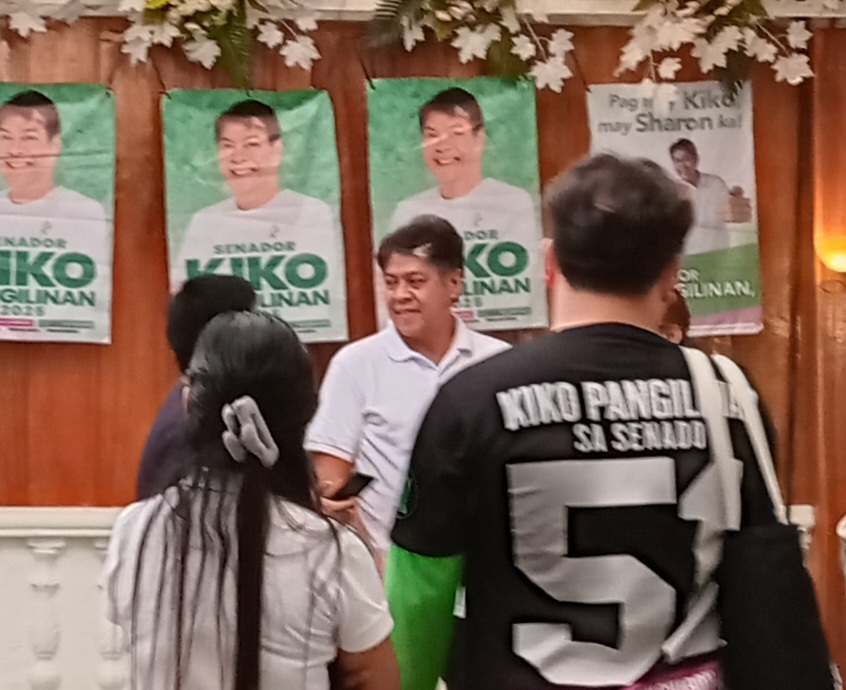
Pangilinan (center) campaigning in Borongan, April 24, 2025

Following the mass, Pangilinan and Aquino conducted house-to-house visits. The day concluded with a campaign rally at the Dasmariñas City Arena in Dasmariñas, Cavite, a province with a significant voter base. The rally featured performances by celebrities, including Sharon Cuneta (Pangilinan's wife), and endorsements from political figures aligned with the opposition.

=== Grassroots and digital engagement ===
The campaign employs a grassroots approach, encapsulated in the "Mga Kaibigan" (Friends) initiative, aimed at uniting Filipinos around their platform.

Additionally, "KiBam" has a strong digital media presence, utilizing online rallies, livestreams, and social media campaigns to reach a broader audience, particularly the youth and overseas Filipino workers (OFWs). Pangilinan has vowed to create and post potentially viral media content, stating that "the campaign should not be too serious".

=== "Pink wave" association ===
Pangilinan and Aquino are associated with the "pink wave", a movement that emerged during the 2022 elections in support of reform-oriented politics. By aligning with Leni Robredo and other figures associated with this movement, the campaign seeks to mobilize support from Filipinos advocating for change, good governance, and social justice.

== Political positions ==
=== Impeachment of Sara Duterte ===
In case the two candidates win and form part of the Senate's impeachment court of Vice President Sara Duterte, they vowed to be fair judges in Duterte's trial. During an earlier interview, Aquino stated that the impeachment was an issue of politicians and not Filipinos, and that his focus is on the welfare of the people.

=== Domestic policies ===
The "KiBam" campaign is centered on governance reforms and economic recovery, with a specific focus on:

- Food security and agriculture – Advocated by Pangilinan, highlighting support for farmers and fisherfolk.
- Education and youth employment – Led by Aquino, focusing on the continuation of free college education and job creation for young Filipinos.
- Social justice and transparent governance – Promoting policies aimed at good governance, accountability, and democratic reforms.

Aquino stated in a one-on-one interview with Karen Davila that he is not in favor of passing a divorce law.

== Results ==
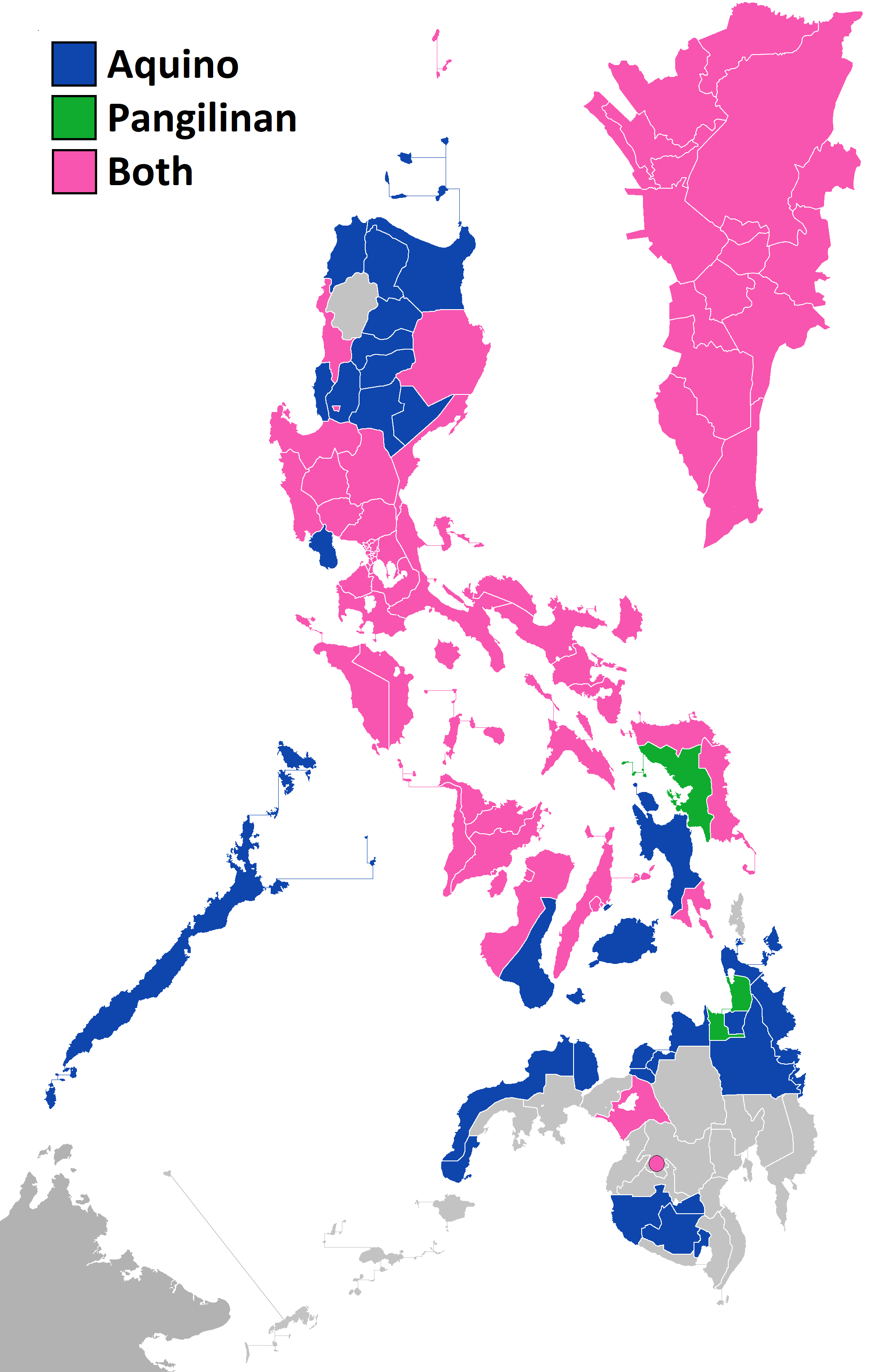
Provincial map results showing where Aquino (blue), Pangilinan (green), or both (pink) entered the top 12

Candidate name and party	Position	Votes	%	Rank	Elected
Bam Aquino; KANP	Former senator (2013–2019)	20,971,899	36.57	2	Yes
Kiko Pangilinan; Liberal	Former senator (2001–2013, 2016–2022)	15,343,229	26.75	5	Yes

Both Aquino and Pangilinan won. According to the official results of the 2025 Senate election by the Commission on Elections, Aquino placed second overall with about 20.97 million votes, while Pangilinan finished fifth with around 15.34 million votes. Political analysts and strategists have described their victories as upsets as both candidates consistently placed outside the top 12 in pre-election surveys.

Both candidates performed well in the country's most vote-rich regions. Aquino topped the entire Lingayen–Lucena corridor, amassing about 10.8 million votes there (according to partial counts) over Senator Bong Go's (the overall first-placer) 8.9 million from that area. One analyst noted it was essentially a "clean sweep" for Aquino in Metro Manila, Central Luzon (where his home province of Tarlac is), and Calabarzon, which together contain the three largest voting populations in the country. In Metro Manila, Aquino was the leading senator in major cities: he ranked first in Manila, Pasig, Quezon City, and Taguig.

Pangilinan likewise performed strongly across Luzon's populous provinces, though usually a few ranks lower than Aquino. According to official results, Pangilinan still made the "winners' circle" (top 12) in 9 of the 10 highest-voter provinces. For example, he placed 4th in his home province of Cavite, the most vote-rich province. He took 2nd in Batangas and Iloilo, 3rd in Laguna, and landed among the top five in Bulacan, Negros Occidental, Pampanga, and Rizal. In Metro Manila's largest cities, Pangilinan consistently landed in the top tier as well: 2nd in Pasig; 3rd in Caloocan, Manila, and Quezon City. Analysts have attributed these to endorsements from popular local officials in those areas. Pangilinan fell short in Mindanao, where DuterTen candidates were mostly popular: for instance, he failed to enter the top 12 in Davao City, the Duterte family's hometown. Aquino similarly lagged in Mindanao, placing around 14th in that island group with about 2.2 million votes; both Aquino and Pangilinan have been critical of former president Rodrigo Duterte's policies. However, their Luzon vote haul was large enough to offset these deficits in Mindanao.

== Endorsements ==
Kiko Pangilinan and Bam Aquino

National executive officials

- Larry Gadon, Presidential Adviser for Poverty Alleviation (2023–present) and disbarred lawyer
- Leni Robredo, 14th Vice President of the Philippines (2016–2022), Member of the Philippine House of Representatives from Camarines Sur's 3rd district (2013–2016), and 2025 mayoral candidate in Naga, Camarines Sur

Philippine Congress

- Maria Rachel Arenas, Member of the Philippine House of Representatives from Pangasinan's 3rd congressional district (2007–2013, 2022–present) and Chairperson of the Movie and Television Review and Classification Board (2017–2021) (endorsed Pangilinan)
- Ferjenel Biron, Member of the Philippine House of Representatives from Iloilo's 4th district (2004–2013, 2016–2019, 2022–present) (endorsed Aquino)
- Perci Cendaña, Member of the Philippine House of Representatives for Akbayan (2024–present) and candidate for representative in the 2025 election as the Akbayan party-list's second nominee
- Paul Daza, Member of the Philippine House of Representatives from Northern Samar's 1st district (2007–2010, 2019–2025) and 7th Governor of Northern Samar (2010–2013) (endorsed Aquino)
- Lorenz Defensor, Member of the Philippine House of Representatives from Iloilo's 3rd district (2019–present)
- Leila de Lima, Senator of the Philippines (2016–2019), 56th Secretary of Justice (2010–2015), Chairperson of the Commission on Human Rights (2008–2010), and candidate for representative in the 2025 election as the Mamamayang Liberal party-list's first nominee
- Franklin Drilon, Senator of the Philippines (1995–2007, 2010–2022) and 18th President of the Senate (2000, 2001–2006, 2013–2016)
- JV Ejercito, Senator of the Philippines (2013–2019, 2022–present), Member of the Philippine House of Representatives from San Juan's at-large district (2010–2013), and Mayor of San Juan (2001–2010) (endorsed Aquino)
- Francis Escudero, Senator of the Philippines (2007–2019, 2022–present), 25th President of the Senate (2024–present), and 23rd Governor of Sorsogon (2019–2022)
- Pablo John Garcia, Member of the Philippine House of Representatives from Cebu's 3rd district (2007–2013, 2019–present) and Deputy Speaker of the House of Representatives of the Philippines (2019–2022) (endorsed Pangilinan)
- Janette Garin, Member of the Philippine House of Representatives from Iloilo's 1st district (2004–2013, 2019–present) and 30th Secretary of Health (2015–2016) (endorsed Aquino)
- Win Gatchalian, Senator of the Philippines (2016–present), Member of the Philippine House of Representatives from Valenzuela's 1st district (2001–2004, 2013–2016), and Mayor of Valenzuela (2004–2013)
- Risa Hontiveros, Senator of the Philippines (2016–present), Member of the Philippine House of Representatives for Akbayan (2004–2010), and campaign manager for KiBam
- Marvey Mariño, Member of the Philippine House of Representatives from Batangas's 5th district (2016–present) (endorsed Pangilinan)
- Carlito Marquez, Member of the Philippine House of Representatives from Aklan's 1st district (2019–present) and Aklan's at-large district (2016–2019) and 14th Governor of Aklan (2004–2013) (endorsed Aquino)
- Salvador Pleyto, Member of the Philippine House of Representatives from Bulacan's 6th district (2022–present) and former undersecretary of the Department of Public Works and Highways (endorsed Pangilinan)
- Grace Poe, Senator of the Philippines (2013–present) and Chairperson of the Movie and Television Review and Classification Board (2010–2012) (endorsed Aquino)
- Dino Tanjuatco, Member of the Philippine House of Representatives from Rizal's 2nd district (2022–present) and Member of the Rizal Provincial Board from the 2nd district (2013–2022) (endorsed Aquino)
- Erin Tañada, Deputy Speaker of the House of Representatives of the Philippines (2010–2013), Member of the Philippine House of Representatives from Quezon's 4th district (2004–2013), and candidate for representative in the 2025 election as the Mamamayang Liberal party-list's third nominee
- Eddie Villanueva, Member of the Philippine House of Representatives for CIBAC (2019–present) and Deputy Speaker of the House of Representatives of the Philippines (2019–2022) (endorsed Pangilinan)
- Joel Villanueva, Senator of the Philippines (2016–present), Majority Floor Leader of the Senate of the Philippines (2022–2024), Director General of the Technical Education and Skills Development Authority (2010–2015), and Member of the Philippine House of Representatives for CIBAC (2002–2010) (endorsed Pangilinan)

Local executive officials

- Vicente Amante, Mayor of San Pablo, Laguna (1992–2001, 2004–2013, 2022–present) (endorsed Pangilinan)
- Joy Belmonte, Mayor of Quezon City (2019–present) and Vice Mayor of Quezon City (2010–2019) (endorsed Pangilinan)
- Albee Benitez, Mayor of Bacolod (2022–present), Member of the Philippine House of Representatives from Negros Occidental's 3rd district (2010–2019), businessman, and television producer (endorsed Pangilinan)
- Ruffy Biazon, Mayor of Muntinlupa (2022–present) and Member of the Philippine House of Representatives from Muntinlupa's at-large district (2001–2010, 2016–2022) (endorsed Pangilinan)
- Fredenil Castro, 24th Governor of Capiz (2022–present) and Member of the Philippine House of Representatives from Capiz's 2nd district (2001–2010, 2013–2022) (endorsed Pangilinan)
- Imelda Dimaporo, 6th Governor of Lanao del Norte (1998–2007, 2016–present) and Member of the Philippine House of Representatives from Lanao del Norte's 1st district (2010–2016) (endorsed Aquino)
- Jun Ebdane, 18th Governor of Zambales (2010–2016, 2019–present), 36th Secretary of Public Works and Highways (2005–2007, 2007–2009), 24th Secretary of National Defense (2007), and 9th Chief of the Philippine National Police (2002–2004) (endorsed Aquino)
- Ben Evardone, 6th Governor of Eastern Samar (2004–2010, 2019–present) and Member of the Philippine House of Representatives from Eastern Samar's at-large district (2010–2019) (endorsed Pangilinan)
- Luis Ferrer IV, Mayor of General Trias (2004–2013, 2022–present) and Member of the Philippine House of Representatives from Cavite's 6th district (2013–2022) (endorsed Aquino)
- Gwendolyn Garcia, 24th Governor of Cebu (2004–2013, 2019–present), Member of the Philippine House of Representatives from Cebu's 3rd district (2013–2019), and Deputy Speaker of the House of Representatives of the Philippines (2016–2018) (endorsed Pangilinan)
- Richard Garin, Mayor of Miagao (2022–present), Member of the Philippine House of Representatives from Iloilo's 1st district (2013–2019), Vice Governor of Iloilo (2010–2013), Member of the Iloilo Provincial Board from the 1st district (1992–1998, 2007–2010), and Mayor of Guimbal (1998–2007) (endorsed Aquino)
- Wes Gatchalian, Mayor of Valenzuela (2022–present), Deputy Speaker of the House of Representatives of the Philippines (2020–2022), and Member of the Philippine House of Representatives from Valenzuela's 1st district (2016–2022) (endorsed Pangilinan)
- Muslim Guiamaden, 2nd Wa'lī of Bangsamoro (2019–present) (endorsed Pangilinan)
- Jose Edwin Hamor, 24th Governor of Sorsogon (2022–present) and Mayor of Casiguran, Sorsogon (1998–2007, 2019–2022) (endorsed Pangilinan)
- Bong Lacson, 42nd Governor of Negros Occidental (2019–present)
- Abdulraof Macacua, Chief Minister of Bangsamoro (2025–present), Member of the Bangsamoro Transition Authority Parliament (2019–2023, 2025–present), Governor of Maguindanao del Norte (2023–2025), Bangsamoro Minister of Environment, Natural Resources, and Energy (2019–2022), and Senior Minister of Bangsamoro (2019–2023) (endorsed Pangilinan)
- Benjamin Magalong, Mayor of Baguio (2019–present), Director of the Criminal Investigation and Detection Group (2013–2015), and retired police officer (endorsed Aquino)
- Isko Moreno, Mayor of Manila (2019–2022, 2025–present), Vice Mayor of Manila (2007–2016), Member of the Manila City Council (1998–2007), actor, and media personality
- Edwin Ongchuan, 9th Governor of Northern Samar (2019–present) and Member of the Philippine House of Representatives from Northern Samar's 2nd district (2016–2019) (endorsed Aquino)
- Muslimin Sema, Bangsamoro Minister of Labor and Employment (2022–present), Vice Mayor of Cotabato City (2010–2013), and Mayor of Cotabato City (2007–2010) (endorsed Aquino)
- Vincent Soriano, Mayor of Pakil (2016–2025), Member of the Laguna Provincial Board from the 4th district (2001–2004), and educator (endorsed Pangilinan)
- Abdusakur Mahail Tan, 6th Governor of Sulu (1996–2001, 2007–2013, 2019–present), Vice Governor of Sulu (2013–2016), Member of the Philippine House of Representatives from Sulu's 1st district (1987–1992), and Member of the Jolo Municipal Council (1981–1987) (endorsed Aquino)
- Jerry Treñas, Mayor of Iloilo City (1992, 2001–2010, 2019–present) and Member of the Philippine House of Representatives from Iloilo's at-large district (2010–2019) (endorsed Aquino)
- Aurelio Umali, 30th Governor of Nueva Ecija (2007–2016, 2019–present) and Member of the Philippine House of Representatives from Nueva Ecija's 3rd district (2001–2007) (endorsed Aquino)
- Alfred Vargas, Member of the Quezon City Council (2010–2013, 2022–present) and Member of the Philippine House of Representatives from Quezon City's 5th district
- Casimiro Ynares III, Mayor of Antipolo (2013–2019, 2022–present) and 19th Governor of Rizal (2007–2013) (endorsed Pangilinan)
- Nina Ynares, 20th Governor of Rizal (2022–present)

Local legislative officials

- Murad Ebrahim, Member of the Bangsamoro Transition Authority Parliament (2019–present), interim Chief Minister of Bangsamoro (2019–2025), Bangsamoro Minister of Finance (2019–2022), and Bangsamoro Minister of Public Works (2019) (endorsed Pangilinan)
- Mohagher Iqbal, Member of the Bangsamoro Transition Authority Parliament (2019–present) and Bangsamoro Minister of Basic, Higher, and Technical Education (2019–present) (endorsed Pangilinan)
- Abdullah Makapaar, Member of the Bangsamoro Transition Authority Parliament (2019–present) (endorsed Pangilinan)
- Ali Solaiman, Deputy Minister for the Mainland Provinces of Bangsamoro (2019–present) and Member of the Bangsamoro Transition Authority Parliament (2019–2021) (endorsed Pangilinan)

Media personalities

- Ogie Alcasid, singer, actor, and television personality (endorsed Pangilinan)
- Pinky Amador, actress and singer
- John Arcilla, actor
- Rita Avila, actress (endorsed Aquino)
- Maysh Baay, musician (Moonstar88) (endorsed Aquino)
- Marjorie Barretto, former actress and member of the Caloocan city council (2007–2013) (endorsed Aquino)
- Bayang Barrios, singer
- Bea Binene, actress (endorsed Aquino)
- Iza Calzado, actress (endorsed Pangilinan)
- Gem Castillo, actress, philanthropist, and 2025 vice-gubernatorial candidate in Laguna (endorsed Pangilinan)
- The Company, vocal group (endorsed Aquino)
- Niccolo Cosme, photographer (endorsed Aquino)
- Sharon Cuneta, actress, singer, and television host; wife of Pangilinan (endorsed Pangilinan)
- Anne Curtis, actress
- Dingdong Dantes, actor and television host (endorsed Aquino)
- Jex de Castro, singer (endorsed Aquino)
- Enchong Dee, actor and model (endorsed Pangilinan)
- Ogie Diaz, actor, comedian, and talent manager
- Mylene Dizon, actress (endorsed Pangilinan)
- Jake Ejercito, actor
- Mark Escueta, musician (Rivermaya) (endorsed Aquino)
- Darren Espanto, singer and actor (endorsed Pangilinan)
- Vice Ganda, actor, comedian, singer, and television personality
- Janno Gibbs, actor, singer, and television personality (endorsed Aquino)
- Bianca Gonzalez, television personality and model
- Janine Gutierrez, actress and video blogger
- Celeste Legaspi, actress and singer (endorsed Aquino)
- Elmo Magalona, actor and singer (endorsed Aquino)
- Jolina Magdangal, actress and singer (endorsed Aquino)
- Edu Manzano, actor, Vice Mayor of Makati (1998–2001), and Chairperson of the Optical Media Board (2004–2009) (endorsed Aquino)
- Jeli Mateo, singer (endorsed Aquino)
- Alex Medina, actor (endorsed Aquino)
- Chito Miranda, singer; nephew of Pangilinan (endorsed Pangilinan)
- Mo Twister, radio and podcast host (endorsed Aquino)
- Elha Nympha, singer (endorsed Aquino)
- Willie Ong, cardiologist, internist, and media personality (endorsed Aquino)
- Donny Pangilinan, actor and television personality; nephew of Pangilinan (endorsed Pangilinan)
- Jim Paredes, musician (Apo Hiking Society) (endorsed Aquino)
- Bodjie Pascua, actor and television personality (endorsed Aquino)
- Piolo Pascual, actor, model, and singer (endorsed Pangilinan)
- Pooh, comedian and television personality (endorsed Pangilinan)
- Maja Salvador, actress and television personality (endorsed Pangilinan)
- Bea Saw, former actress (endorsed Aquino)
- Mitch Valdes, actress, comedienne, and singer (endorsed Aquino)
- Nikki Valdez, actress (endorsed Pangilinan)
- Gary Valenciano, singer and actor; brother-in-law of Pangilinan (endorsed Pangilinan)
- Regine Velasquez, singer and actress (endorsed Pangilinan)
- Viktoria, singer (endorsed Pangilinan)
- Jona Viray, singer and songwriter (endorsed Pangilinan)
- Bimby Aquino Yap, media personality and former child actor; nephew of Aquino (endorsed Aquino)

Political parties and organizations

- 1BANGSA (endorsed Aquino)
- 1Sambayan
- AGRI Partylist (endorsed Pangilinan)
- Akbayan
- Bangsamoro Party (endorsed Aquino)
- Katipunan ng Nagkakaisang Pilipino
- Liberal Party
- LPG Marketers Association (endorsed Aquino)
- Magsasaka Partylist (endorsed Pangilinan)
- Moro Islamic Liberation Front
  - United Bangsamoro Justice Party

Religious organizations

- Iglesia ni Cristo (endorsed Aquino)
- Jesus Is Lord Church (endorsed Pangilinan)

Educational institutions and organizations

- Polytechnic University of the Philippines Student Council
- UP Diliman University Student Council

== Aftermath ==
At the start of the 20th Congress, Senators Aquino and Pangilinan joined the majority bloc, while campaign manager Risa Hontiveros joined the minority, after the duo voted to retain Chiz Escudero as Senate president. On September 8, 2025, Senators Aquino, Hontiveros, and Pangilinan were among 15 senators who voted for a Senate leadership coup that installed Tito Sotto to replace Escudero as Senate president, thus Hontiveros joined Aquino and Pangilinan in the majority bloc.

== See also ==
- DuterTen, another opposition coalition at the 2025 Philippine Senate election
- Team Robredo–Pangilinan, the coalition's predecessor in 2022
- Otso Diretso, the coalition's predecessor in 2019
- Koalisyon ng Daang Matuwid, the coalition's predecessor in 2016
- Team PNoy, the coalition's predecessor in 2013
