= Pitts and Lee v. Florida =

1963 criminal case

Pitts and Lee v. Florida (1963) (often referred to as the Pitts-Lee case) was a criminal case in which two African-American defendants were charged with murder. The case is remembered for its Civil Rights implications, and because it involved two death-row inmates who were later exonerated. The prosecutors deliberately tampered with evidence, and the men were sentenced to death by an all-white jury, Freddie Lee Pitts and Wilbert Lee (the defendants) were imprisoned for twelve years before being pardoned by then-Florida Governor Reubin Askew on September 20, 1975.

== Background ==
The crime occurred on August 1, 1963, in Port St. Joe, Florida. On the night of the crime, Freddie Pitts (age 19), Wilbert Lee (28), and several other people went to a Mo-Jo gas station in the small town. Pitts and Lee went to use the restroom, but the restrooms in the facility were only for whites. This caused Pitts and Lee to get into an argument with the attendants, two white men named Grover Floyd Jr. and Jesse Burkett.

Floyd and Burkett were found dead three days later. They had been shot to death. After being coerced by the police into making an accusation, a woman who was with Pitts and Lee accused Pitts and another man of the crime. This other suspect was a soldier who worked for the military, and they provided an alibi for him. The woman then changed her accusation, accusing Pitts and Lee of the crime.

Pitts and Lee confessed to the crime after the police beat them and threatened to harm Lee's wife, among other examples of cruel treatment. Their lawyer, who had been appointed by the Court, advised them to plead guilty, one of which was a family member to one of the victims. The two men did not have a trial, as they had confessed to the crime and pleaded guilty. They were sentenced to death by an all-white jury on August 28, 1963.

In 1966, a man named Curtis Adams confessed to the murders of Floyd and Burkett.

== Appeals ==
Pitts and Lee spent over a decade appealing their case. In 1964 they appealed to the Florida Supreme Court, alleging that the judge in their case had made procedural errors. However, the Court ruled against them.

They then filed a motion objecting to the composition of the jury that had sentenced them, and after the trial court ruled against them, they appealed to the Florida First District Court of Appeal. The Court upheld the lower court's ruling.

Pitts and Lee filed another attack on their convictions in 1967. They argued several points. They objected to the fact that one lawyer had represented both of them, that people who opposed the death penalty had not been included on the jury, they argued that their guilty plea was based on coercion, that their lawyer had been inadequate, that the State had withheld evidence that supported their innocence, and that Curtis Adams had confessed to the crime.

Not only had Adams confessed to the crime, but the woman who accused them was now saying that she had been coerced into fingering them. However, there was considerable resistance in the state to acknowledging these facts. When the Gulf County sheriff was told about Adams' confession, he said that "`I got two niggers on Death Row who already did it.'"

However, in Court the prosecutors refused to grant Adams immunity for his crime, so he pleaded the Fifth Amendment. While the Court had ample evidence that Adams had told other people about his guilt (including testimony from Adams' girlfriend), they could not use it because of Adams pleading the fifth.

Warren Holmes, the man who had taken Adams' confession under a lie detector, mentioned the case to his friend Gene Miller. Holmes told Miller that he believed Pitts and Lee were innocent. Miller, a reporter for the Miami Herald, began to investigate the case. He wrote a book on his findings, Invitation to a Lynching, which argued that Pitts and Lee had been wrongfully convicted. In 1976, Miller would be awarded a Pulitzer Prize in Local General or Spot News Reporting for his work on "Invitation to a Lynching". This book convinced Florida Attorney General Robert Shevin to testify to the Florida Supreme Court that he believed the State had wrongfully withheld evidence, and that the two men were actually innocent. Shevin later admitted that this confession of error likely cost him his chances at being elected governor, "But it was right and I had to do it."

Pitts and Lee then had an actual trial, but they were again declared guilty by an all-white jury. Neither Adams' confession nor the prosecution's earlier suppression of evidence were allowed to be presented to the jury. The US Supreme Court's decision in Furman v. Georgia caused their death penalty sentences to be commuted to life imprisonment. Pitts and Lee made an appeal to the US Supreme Court, but the Governor would pardon them before the Supreme Court decided whether to grant certiorari.

== Pardon ==
Arthur Canaday, General Counsel to Governor Reubin Askew, read an early copy of Miller's Invitation to a Lynching. Canaday found the book persuasive and he told Askew that there was a real chance that the defendants were innocent. Askew launched an investigation into the case, and he too became convinced that Pitts and Lee were innocent. The Governor and three members of the cabinet (Attorney General Robert Shevin, (whom Canaday previously worked for), Treasurer Phil Ashler, and Education Commissioner Ralph Turlington), signed a pardon that freed Pitts and Lee after twelve years in prison.

== Aftermath ==
After being pardoned, Lee worked for the Florida Department of Health and Rehabilitative Services as a juvenile counselor. However, Lee lost his job in 1985 after Florida passed a law banning former felons from working with children. Lee took legal action, and although a lower court ruled against him, the Florida 3rd District Court of Appeal ruled in his favor. The Court ruled that Askew's pardon made Lee free from any legal consequences of his conviction.

Pitts and Lee would work for years to try to gain some sort of compensation for their wrongful imprisonment. A bill was introduced multiple times in the Florida Legislature to grant them money to attempt to make up for their imprisonment, but it failed nineteen times. The legislation was regularly defeated by a traditional Southern Democratic faction of conservative legislators from the Panhandle.

In 1998, Kendrick Meek reintroduced the bill in the Florida House, and Betty Holzendorf reintroduced it in the Senate. Holzendorf and Meek, along with a faction of more liberal Democrats, forged an alliance with Florida Republicans over getting the bill passed.

However, the House wanted to give the men substantially less money than the Senate did. The Florida House ended up passing a bill that would allow a hearing officer from the Florida Department of Administrative Hearings to grant the men a reward of up to $350,000. A committee in the Senate voted to directly give each man $1.5 million. The Senate and House were eventually able to reach a compromise. April 30, 1998, Florida Governor Lawton Chiles signed a bill into law that granted each man $500,000 as long as a state administrative judge concurred with the assertion that the state had wronged them.
