= 2021 Calabarzon raids =

2021 killings and arrests of activists in Calabarzon, Philippines

- Date: March 7, 2021; 5 years ago
- Location: Laguna, Cavite, Batangas, and Rizal provinces, Philippines
- Also known as: Bloody Sunday, COPLAN ASVAL
- Motive: Suspected ties of targets to the Communist rebellion; to serve search warrants due to targets suspected to possess illegal firearms and explosives.
- Target: Activists from different organizations including: Bagong Alyansang Makabayan; Kilusang Mayo Uno; Karapatan; Confederation for the Unity, Recognition, and Advancement of Government Employees; Ugnayan ng Mamamayan Laban sa Pagwasak ng Kalikasan at Kalupaan; San Isidro Kasiglahan, Kapatiran, at Damayan para sa Kabuhayan, Katarungan, at Kapayapaan
- Participants: Law enforcement operations by: Armed Forces of the Philippines; Philippine National Police
- Deaths: 9
- Arrests: 6

The 2021 Calabarzon raids, also referred to as Bloody Sunday and COPLAN ASVAL, (Note: "Case Operation Plan ASVAL") were a series of operations conducted by the Philippine National Police (PNP) and the Philippine Army in Calabarzon, Philippines, on March 7, 2021, that resulted in the killing of nine activists and the arrest of six individuals. The victims were left-wing activists and environmentalists, including six who were killed in Rizal, two in Batangas, and one in Cavite.

Police alleged that weapons and grenades were found during the operations and that the activists were killed for resisting arrest, claims that were met with skepticism by human rights organizations and Vice President Leni Robredo, who described the killings as a "massacre." The Office of the United Nations High Commissioner for Human Rights condemned the raids, saying it was "appalled by the apparently arbitrary killing" of the activists. A spokesperson for the office said at a press briefing: "We are deeply worried that these latest killings indicate an escalation in violence, intimidation, harassment and 'red-tagging' of human rights defenders,"

== Background ==
Two days before the crackdown, President Rodrigo Duterte said at a televised public event where he directed the police and the military to "finish off" and kill all members of the communist rebel group New People's Army advising them to "don't mind human rights". Numerous media outlets have linked the Bloody Sunday killings to this speech. The national government under President Duterte has accused the targeted activists of belonging to organizations affiliated with the Communist insurgency.

This took place within the context of the COVID-19 pandemic in the Philippines and the various COVID-19 community quarantines in the Philippines, which had the effect of increasing the government's influence on the day-to-day lives of Filipinos.

Duterte is facing complaints filed before the International Criminal Court for an anti-drug campaign that has killed thousands of victims, most of whom were from poor families.

The International Trade Union Confederation listed the Philippines among the 10 worst countries for workers, citing the high number of trade unionists murdered in 2021.

== Arrests and killings ==
On March 7, police and military conducted simultaneous operations against a reported total of 24 individuals, most around the hours of 4:00 in the morning. Police served search warrants issued by Judges Jose Lorenzo Dela Rosa and Jason Zapanta from two branches of the Manila regional trial court. The operations were conducted by the Criminal Investigation and Detection Group (CIDG), the Special Action Force and the 202nd Brigade of the Philippine Army.

The following are those who were arrested:

- Esteban Mendoza – executive vice president of Organized Labor Association in Line Industries and Agriculture – Kilusang Mayo Uno (OLALIA-KMU), arrested in his home at Mamatid, Cabuyao, Laguna, at approximately 3:50 am
- Elizabeth "Mags" Camoral – spokesperson for BAYAN Laguna, arrested following a raid of the Defend Yulo Farmers Network office at San Isidro, Cabuyao, Laguna, 4:15 am
- Nimfa Lanzanas – paralegal for rights group Karapatan and member of Kapatid Timog Katagalugan, arrested in her home at Sampirohan, Calamba, Laguna, at approximately 4 am. Her three grandchildren, ages 6, 9, and 12, were with her at the time.
- Eugene Eugenio – member of the Confederation for the Unity, Recognition, and Advancement of Government Employees (COURAGE) Rizal, arrested in Antipolo
- Joan Ignacio Efren – arrested at her residence at Sitio Lukutang Malaki, San Isidro, Rodriguez, Rizal
- One unidentified individual – arrested in Rizal

An investigation by rights group Karapatan Southern Tagalog identified the following people as having been arrested or killed as a result of COPLAN ASVAL. The following are the names of those that were killed:

- Emmanuel "Manny" Asuncion – coordinator of Bagong Alyansang Makabayan (BAYAN) Cavite, killed inside the Workers' Assistance Center office in Dasmariñas. Witnesses state that he was shot 10 times and dragged outside the office.
- Anna Mariz "Chai" Lemita-Evangelista – member of environmental organization Ugnayan ng Mamamayan Laban sa Pagwasak ng Kalikasan at Kalupaan (UMALPAS KA), killed in her home alongside her husband Ariel at Calayo, Nasugbu, Batangas
- Ariel Evangelista – member of UMALPAS KA, killed alongside his wife Chai in their home in Nasugbu, Batangas
- Melvin "Greg" Dasigao – member of urban poor organization San Isidro Kasiglahan, Kapatiran, at Damayan para sa Kabuhayan, Katarungan, at Kapayapaan (SIKKAD-K3), killed in his home in Rodriguez, Rizal
- Mark Lee "Makmak" Coros Bacasno – member of SIKKAD-K3 and killed in Rodriguez, Rizal
- Abner Damas Mendoza Esto – member of SIKKAD-K3 and killed in Rodriguez, Rizal
- Edward Damas Mendoza Esto – member of SIKKAD-K3 and killed in Rodriguez, Rizal
- Puroy Dela Cruz – Indigenous Dumagat and ecumenical leader of Samahan ni Maria (Society of Mary) and killed at Sitio Mina, Santa Inez, Tanay, Rizal, between 3:00 and 4:00 am
- Randy "Pulong" Dela Cruz, Indigenous Dumagat and killed at Sitio Mina, Santa Inez, Tanay, Rizal

In addition, the police raided the homes of Lino Baez, coordinator for BAYAN Batangas, and Rizal peasant leaders Moises Braganza and a certain "Dodong Bagsik", and reportedly confiscated firearms and explosives; but the individuals were not home at the time.

== Investigation ==
The Administrative Order 35 Task Force, a body under the Department of Justice, which looks into cases of extrajudicial killings, has been tasked to investigate the Bloody Sunday killings.

In July 2021, four months after the incident, forensic reports showed that the activists were deliberately killed, calling into question earlier reports that the victims had been killed while resisting arrest.

In January 2022, the National Bureau of Investigation filed murder complaints against 17 police officers over the killing of Ariel Evangelista and Ana Lemita–Evangelista in their home in Nasugbu, Batangas. Department of Justice prosecutors, in its December 5, 2022 resolution released in March 2023, dismissed the complaints, citing lack of evidence. A motion seeking for reversal of the ruling was filed in May; however, in a resolution dated May 29 but released in July, DOJ denied the appeal for lack of merit, thus affirming the earlier ruling.

Meanwhile, in January 2023, the DOJ likewise dismissed complaints against the same individuals in connection with the death of Manny Asuncion.

== Response ==
=== Reactions ===
Local and international groups condemned the series of arrests and killings.

The National Union of Peoples' Lawyers called on the Philippine Supreme Court to review the "administrative order that allows executive and vice executive judges to issue search warrants". According to the group, judges must "carefully look into the applications for warrants, especially if the police's narrative is unbelievable," citing in particular the circumstances surrounding Lanzanas' arrest.

Vice President Leni Robredo similarly condemned the killings, stating:

There is no other way to describe this: It was a massacre. And it came just two days after the President himself ordered state forces to "ignore human rights," kill communist rebels, and "finish them off," in his rant before the National Task Force to End Local Communist Armed Conflict.

Senator Risa Hontiveros condemned the killings saying it was due to "this administration's high level of disrespect for basic human rights." Senator Leila de Lima slammed Duterte for his "kill, kill, kill" policy. Senator Francis Pangilinan said that the Philippine National Police should use the P289 million worth of body cameras purchased in 2018 to prevent killings like the one in Calabarzon. Representatives Ferdinand Gaite, Carlos Zarate, Eufemia Cullamat, Arlene Brosas, France Castro, Sarah Elago, Edcel Lagman, and Kit Belmonte called for the House of Representatives' human rights committee to investigate the deadly raids.

Amnesty International stated that it was "deeply alarmed" at how police operations were being used against activists. Human Rights Watch called the series of killings a part of the Philippine government's "dirty war", and urged the UN to deploy a "rapid response unit" to investigate the killings.

The United Nations Office of the High Commissioner for Human Rights was similarly "appalled at the apparently arbitrary killing of nine activists." The European Union delegation to the Philippines said that it welcomed the Philippine Government's eventual announcement that it would launch an investigation, but also reminded the government that it had made a commitment to the United Nations Human Rights Council "to ensure accountability for human rights violations and abuses."

The Philippine National Police defended its actions, stating that the operations were legitimate. PNP Chief Debold Sinas stated that the existence of search warrants proves their legitimacy, while PNP spokesperson Ildebrandi Usana claimed that the victims were "members of the New People's Army hiding behind the façade of being activists."

=== Reforms ===
Following complaints of abuse, the Supreme Court issued on June 29, 2021, Administrative Matter No. 21-06-08-SC that curbs the power of local courts to issue search warrants outside their judicial regions. It also requires law enforcers to record their implementation of court-issued warrants on video or risk facing sanctions.

== See also ==
- Red-tagging in the Philippines
- Extrajudicial killings and forced disappearances in the Philippines
