= Jerome Adonis =

Trade union and labor activist (born 1972)

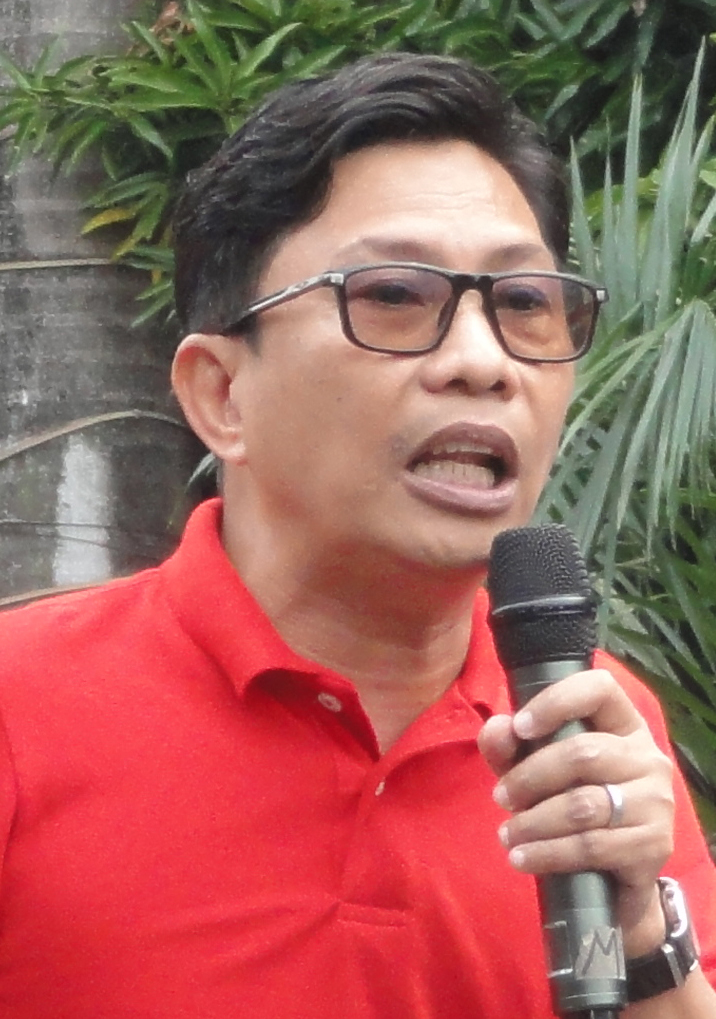
- Adonis at the Senate announcement of Makabayan for the 2025 Philippine general election.

Chairperson of Kilusang Mayo Uno
- Incumbent
- Assumed office June 30, 2025
- Preceded by: Elmer Labog

Secretary-General of Kilusang Mayo Uno
- In office August 29, 2015 – June 30, 2025
- Preceded by: Roger Soluta
- Succeeded by: Mary Ann Castillo

Personal details
- Born: Ronald Mangampo Adonis; February 27, 1972 (age 54) Manito, Albay, Philippines
- Party: Makabayan
- Other political affiliations: Kilusang Mayo Uno
- Children: Nadine Lynn Labayo
- Occupation: Labor leader, activist

Ronald Mangampo "Jerome" Adonis (born February 27, 1972) is a Filipino trade union and labor activist. Since 2025, he has been serving as the national chairperson of Kilusang Mayo Uno (KMU), the largest trade union in the country. He ran under Makabayan in the 2025 Philippine Senate election.

== Early life ==
Eldest of six siblings, Adonis was born in 1972 in Ligao, Albay. His family left Bicol because of the militarization under the Marcos dictatorship. He left high school and worked at age 16 at a carton factory. In 1992, he worked as a bus conductor for Pasvil-Pascual Liner Incorporated. This is where he joined the workers union PASVIL/Pascual Liner Inc. Workers Union – NAFLU – KMU.

== Activism ==
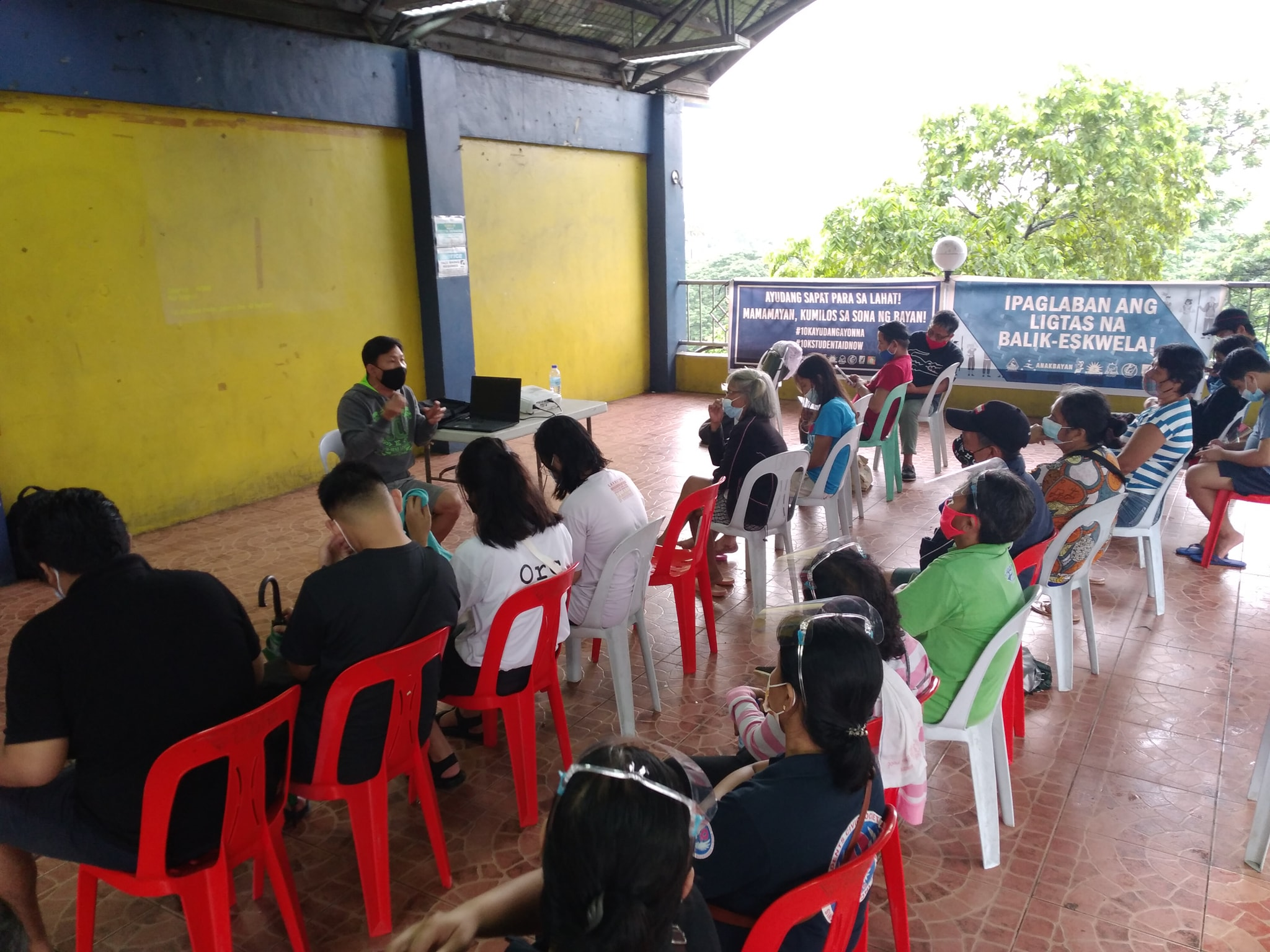
Adonis conducting consultation with communities in Quezon City, 2021.

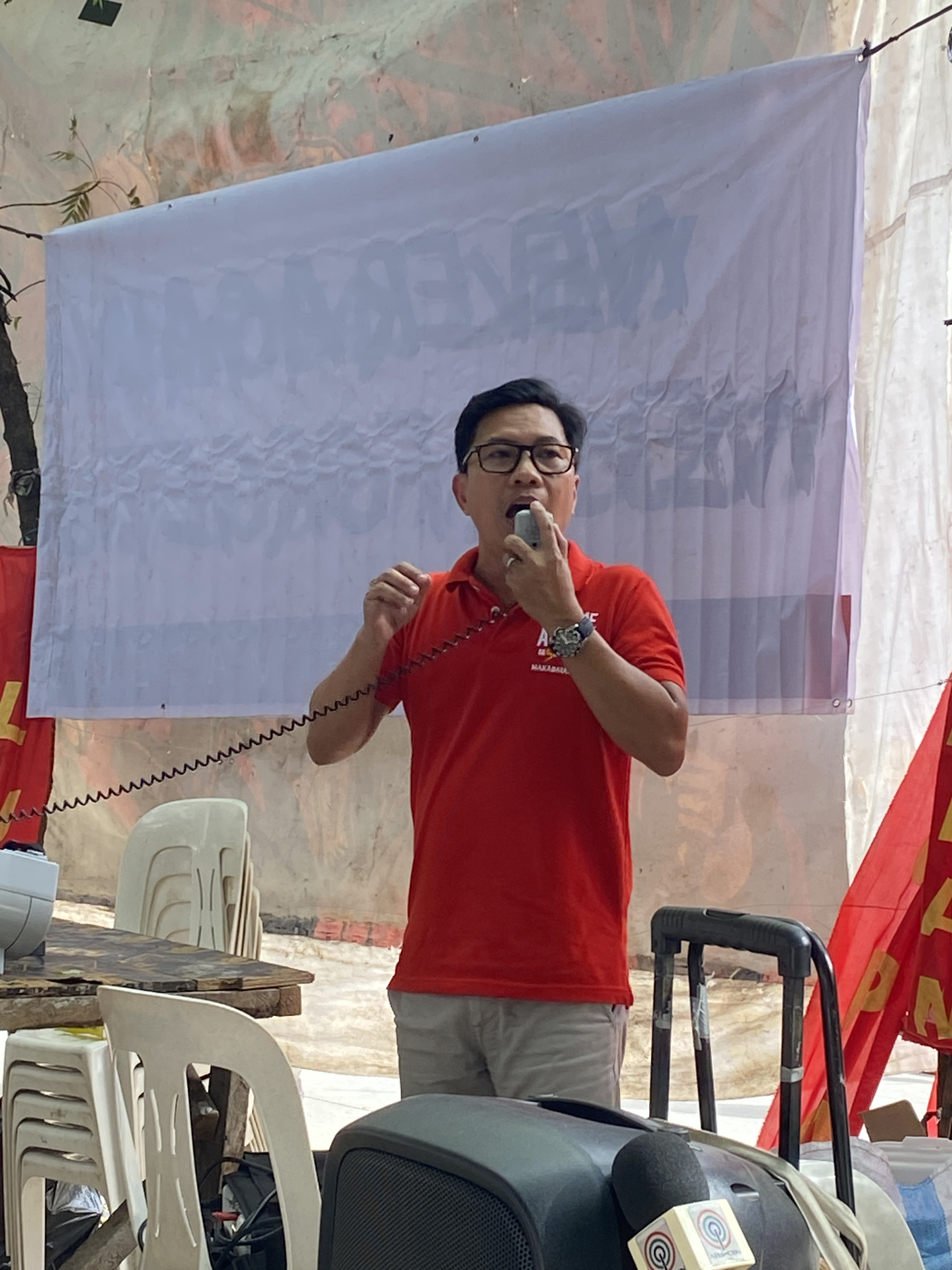
Adonis, speaking in front of Central Luzon farmers who camped out outside the Department of Agrarian Reform

As member of the PASVIL/Pascual Liner Inc. Workers Union – NAFLU – KMU, Adonis joined the labor strike in 1995 to demand better working conditions from the management. They were protesting against the exploitation and exhaustion of workers, with co-workers felling ill and dying.

Adonis became a full-time labor organizer of KMU in 2002 and was elected as its secretary-general at its 11th Congress in 2015 and reelected in 2018 at its 12th Congress. During the labor center's 13th Congress in 2025, he was subsequently elected as its national chairperson, replacing Elmer Labog who had served in his capacity since 2003. He was also elected as second deputy secretary of the International League of Peoples' Struggle in early 2024. He also represented the Philippines during the International Trade Union Confederation World Congresses in 2018 and 2022.

As a labor organizer, he has continuously pushed for livable wages, advocating for 1,200 National Minimum Wage as of 2024.

On December 4, 2024, Adonis and 74 others filed the second impeachment complaint against Vice President Sara Duterte, citing betrayal of public trust for her office's alleged misuse of confidential funds. By February 2025, it was consolidated with two other complaints into a single impeachment complaint and signed by 240 lawmakers out of 305, reaching the 1/3 votes threshold and impeaching Vice President Duterte.

On January 26, 2026, Adonis and 35 others filed the second impeachment complaint against President Bongbong Marcos, citing his potential involvement in the "BBM Parametric Formula" used by the Department of Public Works and Highways, which they alleged to have allowed systemic corruption in government, as well as his alleged involvement in kickback schemes and unprogrammed appropriations.

== 2025 Senate bid ==
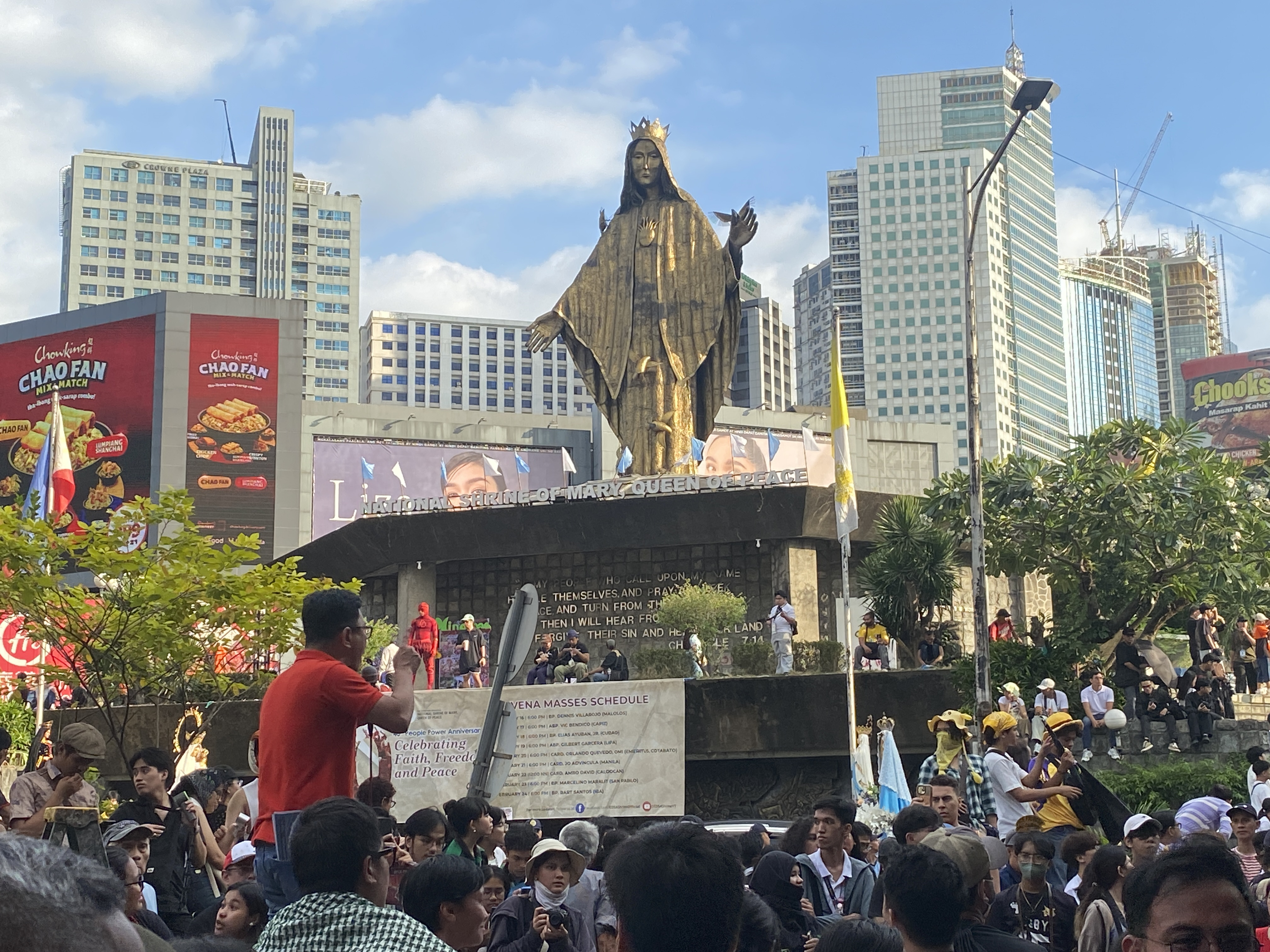
Speaking at the Baha Sa EDSA mobilization, part of the EDSA People Power 40th anniversary commemoration and Philippine anti-corruption protests.

He was announced as Makabayan Coalition's third senatorial bet on August 2, 2024, during a meeting of a labor union in Cabuyao, Laguna.

Adonis along with 10 other Makabayan Senatorial bets would file their Certificates of Candidacy (COC) on October 4, 2024.

Adonis would lose the 2025 Senate election and would place 49th with 779,868 votes.

== See also ==
- Bong Labog
