= Si Manoy Ang Ninong Ko =

2024 Philippine television public affairs

- Title card
- Genre: Public affairs
- Country of origin: Philippines
- Original language: Tagalog
- No. of seasons: 2

Production
- Camera setup: Multiple-camera setup
- Running time: 60 minutes

Original release
- Network: GMA Network
- Release: March 3 – July 28, 2024

Si Manoy Ang Ninong Ko is a Philippine television public affairs broadcast by GMA Network. Hosted by Wilbert T. Lee, it premiered on March 3, 2024 on the network's Sunday Grande sa Umaga lineup. The show concluded on July 28, 2024.

The show is streaming online on YouTube. The second season premiered in June.

== Premise ==
The program features the real-life stories and struggles of Filipinos, seeking to provide practical, long-term assistance and opportunities to beneficiaries while inspiring hope, perseverance, and community compassion.

== Hosts ==
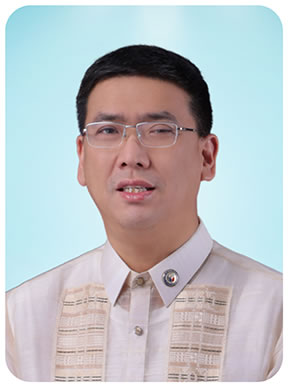
Wilbert T. Lee served as the host.

- Wilbert T. Lee

Co-hosts

- Gelli de Belen
- Patricia Tumulak
- Sherilyn Reyes-Tan

Guest hosts

- Bea Luigi Gomez
- Andrea Torres
