= Ernesto Arellano =

Filipino lawyer and labor-rights activist (b. 1940)

- Born: Ernesto Rillera Arellano; May 29, 1940 (age 85); Naguilian, La Union, Philippine Commonwealth
- Occupations: Lawyer, labor rights activist
- Political party: Katipunan ng Kamalayang Kayumanggi

Ernesto Rillera Arellano (born May 29, 1940) is a Filipino lawyer and labor rights activist.

== Early life and education ==
Ernesto Rillera Arellano was born on May 29, 1940 in Naguilian, La Union. His parents were farmers and finished his basic education in La Union. He accomplished his collegiate education in an institution in Baguio.

== Career ==
=== Legal career and civic involvement ===
Arellano is a co-founder of various labor organizations such as he Kilusang Mayo Uno, the National Confederation of Labor (NCL), National Federation of Labor, and the Legal Advocates for Workers' Interest. He also has affiliations with groups such as the Katipunan ng mga Samahan ng Manggagawa and the Katipunan ng Maralitang Pilipino.

=== Political career ===
==== Senate elections ====
Arellano ran for Senator in the 2019 Philippine election under the Labor Win Alliance and failed to win. He ran again for the 2025 Philippine election under the Katipunan ng Kamalayang Kayumanggi party.

The NCL where Arellano serves as a spokesperson had filed a petition to delay the printing of ballots for the 2025 election to ask the Commission on Election to verify the eligibility of candidates citing the case of Alice Guo who had dubious citizenship status.

==== Positions ====
Arellano has been against endo contractualization. He also believes that the Pantawid Pamilyang Pilipino Program beneficiaries should be able to given employment in two to three years.
