= Wilbert T. Lee =

Filipino businessman and politician

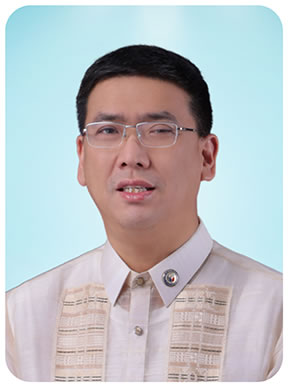
- Official portrait, 2022

Member of the Philippine House of Representatives for AGRI Partylist
- In office June 30, 2022 – June 30, 2025

Personal details
- Born: Wilbert Te Lee; October 12, 1970 (age 56) Manila, Philippines
- Party: Aksyon Demokratiko (2024–present); AGRI (Party-list) (2021–present)
- Spouse: Delphine Gan
- Education: University of Santo Tomas (BSBA)
- Occupation: Politician
- Profession: Businessman

Wilbert "Manoy" Te Lee (born October 12, 1970) is a Filipino businessman and politician who has served as the representative for AGRI Partylist since 2022. He was a candidate in the 2025 Philippine Senate election and was noted for his significant campaign expenses. He withdrew his bid in February 2025.

A graduate of the University of Santo Tomas, Lee was the chair of the LKY Group of Companies before his election to Congress. During his tenure, he authored and led the passage of the New Agrarian Emancipation Act in 2023.

== Early life and education ==
Wilbert Te Lee was born on October 12, 1970. He is the son of Sorsogon-based businessman Lee King Yek. He studied at the University of Santo Tomas, graduating in 1991 with a bachelor's degree in business administration.

== Early career ==
Lee's journey as a businessman began in 1965 when his father, Lee King Yek, first opened a Goodluck Store, a retail store, in Sorsogon. Garnering knowledge from his father, Lee grew his father's business into the LKY Group of Companies, serving as its chair, which has interests in the retail, food, real estate, and hospitality sectors. The LKY Group employs over 3,000 people in different provinces of the country.

While expanding the LKY Group of Companies, Lee also established the LKY Foundation, which provides medical assistance to children fighting leukemia and other terminal illnesses. The Foundation also rescues abandoned cats and dogs.

During his time as a businessman, Lee was awarded the esteemed “Most Outstanding Sorsogueño Award in the field of Business and Industry” by the Provincial Government of Sorsogon in 1997. In 2006, Lee was awarded Bicol's most prestigious “Halyao Award” for being voted the Bicolano Businessman of the Year by the Metro Naga Chamber of Commerce and Industry and the Provincial Government of Camarines Sur. In 2011, Lee was also named a Rokyaw Ibalnong Awardee for Business and Industry during the Ibalong Festival.

== House of Representatives ==
In 2022, Lee ran as the representative for the Agri-Agra na Reporma para sa Magsasaka ng Pilipinas Movement (AGRI Party-List) and won. During his tenure, he sat on 24 Congressional committees and authored 124 bills and resolutions.

In his first year in Congress, he principally authored the New Agrarian Emancipation Act, a law that freed more than 600,000 farmers from debt. He is also the author of the Philippine Salt Industry Development Act, which aims to generate thousands of new jobs in the agricultural sector.

Lee also filed House Bill No. 9011, which seeks to build fishing shelters or ports at nine maritime spots within the Philippines’ exclusive economic zone amidst worsening tensions with China.

== 2025 Philippine Senate bid ==
In 2024, Lee announced that he would run for senator in 2025 under Aksyon Demokratiko, a party founded by another Bicolano, Raul Roco. In September 2024, he formally joined the party. The Philippine Center for Investigative Journalism (PCIJ) noted that Lee spent ₱2.5 million from April 20 to July 18 to boost posts on Facebook. The PCIJ also concluded that his appearances in billboards and the GMA Network morning show Si Manoy ang Ninong Ko is part of his 2025 bid.

In February 2025, Lee withdrew his candidacy for the Senate, citing insufficient political machinery.

== Television ==
Lee, along with co-hosts Gelli de Belen, Patricia Tumulak, and Sherilyn Reyes-Tan, has featured in the GMA Network public service morning show, Si Manoy Ang Ninong Ko, which premiered on March 3, 2024. The show features the hosts learning about the struggles of two beneficiaries per episode.

== Personal life ==
Lee has been married to former AGRI Party-List representative Delphine Gan Lee for over thirty years. They have four children.

== Electoral history ==
Electoral history of Wilbert T. Lee
Year	Office	Party	Votes received				Result
Year	Office	Party	Total	%	P.	Swing	Result
2022	Representative (Party-list)	AGRI	393,987	1.08%	23rd	—N/a	Won
2025	Senator of the Philippines	Aksyon	587,098	1.02%	56th	—N/a	Withdrawn
