= Amirah Lidasan =

Filipino activist and senate candidate (born 1974)

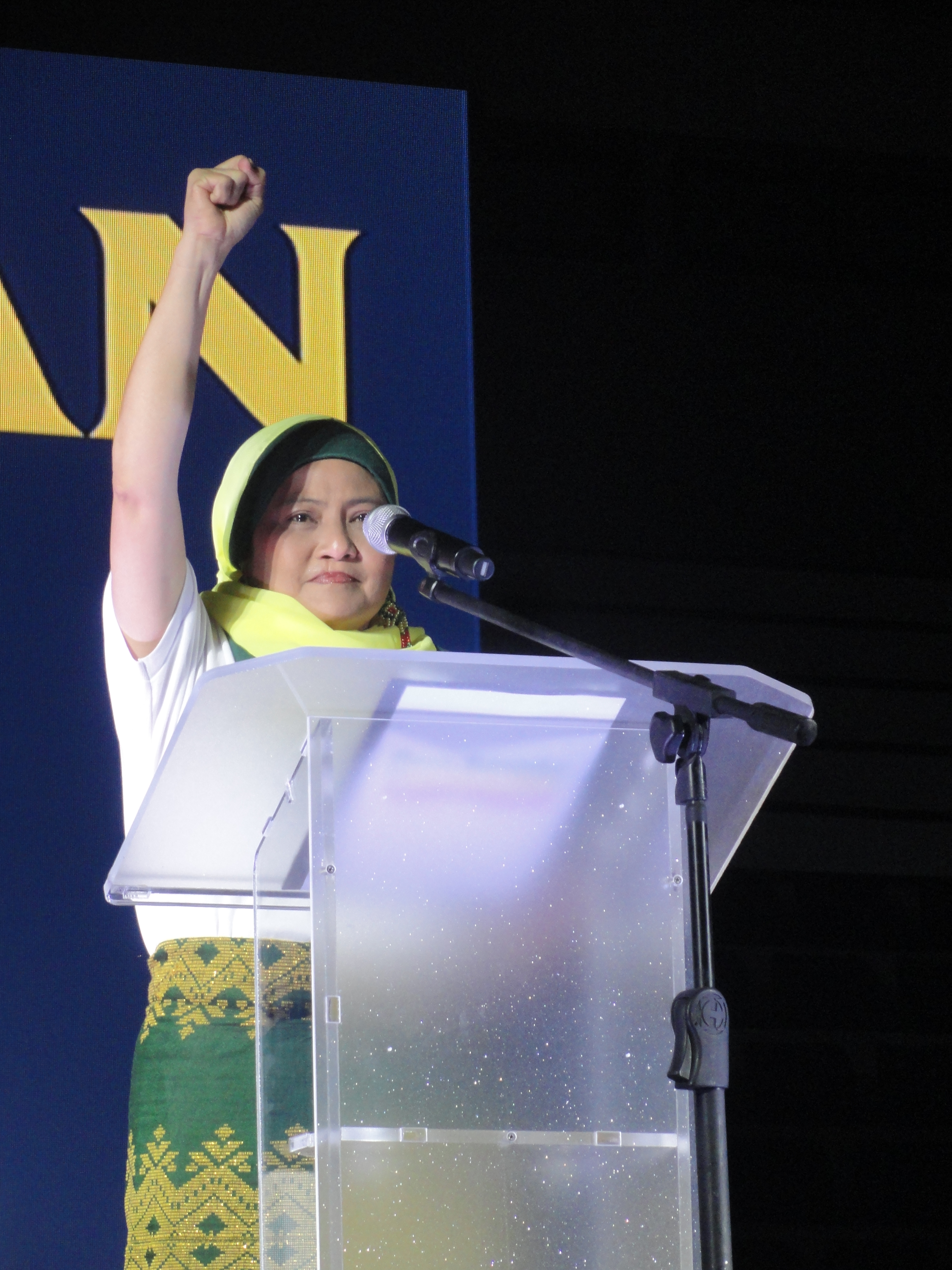
- Lidasan at the Makabayan National Convention for the 2025 Philippine general election.

Co-chairperson of Sandugo-Movement of Moro and Indigenous Peoples for Self-Determination

Personal details
- Born: Amirah Ali Lidasan; September 23, 1974 (age 52) Manila, Philippines
- Party: Makabayan
- Education: University of the Philippines Diliman (BA)
- Occupation: Moro leader, activist

Amirah Ali "Mek" Lidasan (born September 23, 1974) is a Filipina and Moro activist who is the co-chairperson of the Sandugo-Movement of Moro and Indigenous Peoples for Self-Determination. She ran under Makabayan in the 2025 Philippine Senate election.

== Early life ==
The Lidasan clan came from the Iranon tribe of Matanog and Parang, Maguindanao. Because of the conflicts in Maguindanao, their family moved to Manila.

== Activism ==
She was first exposed to student activism during her studies at the University of the Philippines Diliman as she was taking BA Journalism. She was active in organizations like Union of Journalists of the Philippines and the Center for Nationalist Studies where she was enticed by the latter's discussions and analyses against tuition fee increases. She joined the National Union of Students of the Philippines and became its National Chairperson in 1995. She then volunteered for Karapatan and Kilusang Mayo Uno. Coming from a fact-finding mission among the human rights situation in Mindanao, she became instrumental in the establishment of the Moro-Christian People's Alliance in August 1999.

During President Joseph Estrada's all-out war, she and her family became a bakwit (evacuee) as government forces of the central camp of the Moro Islamic Liberation Front (MILF) Camp Abubakar near her ancestral home. She was assisted by organizations such as Bagong Alyansang Makabayan, Promotion of Church Peopleʼs Response, National Council of Churches in the Philippines, and Christian Conference of Asia in seeking solidarity and help for Moros affected and pleading for the stoppage of the all-out war. She participated in the EDSA II Revolt.

She became the first nominee of the Suara Bangsamoro party-list during the 2004 Philippine House of Representatives elections. However the organization failed to win a single seat, alleging that it has been a victim of voter fraud in Mindanao.

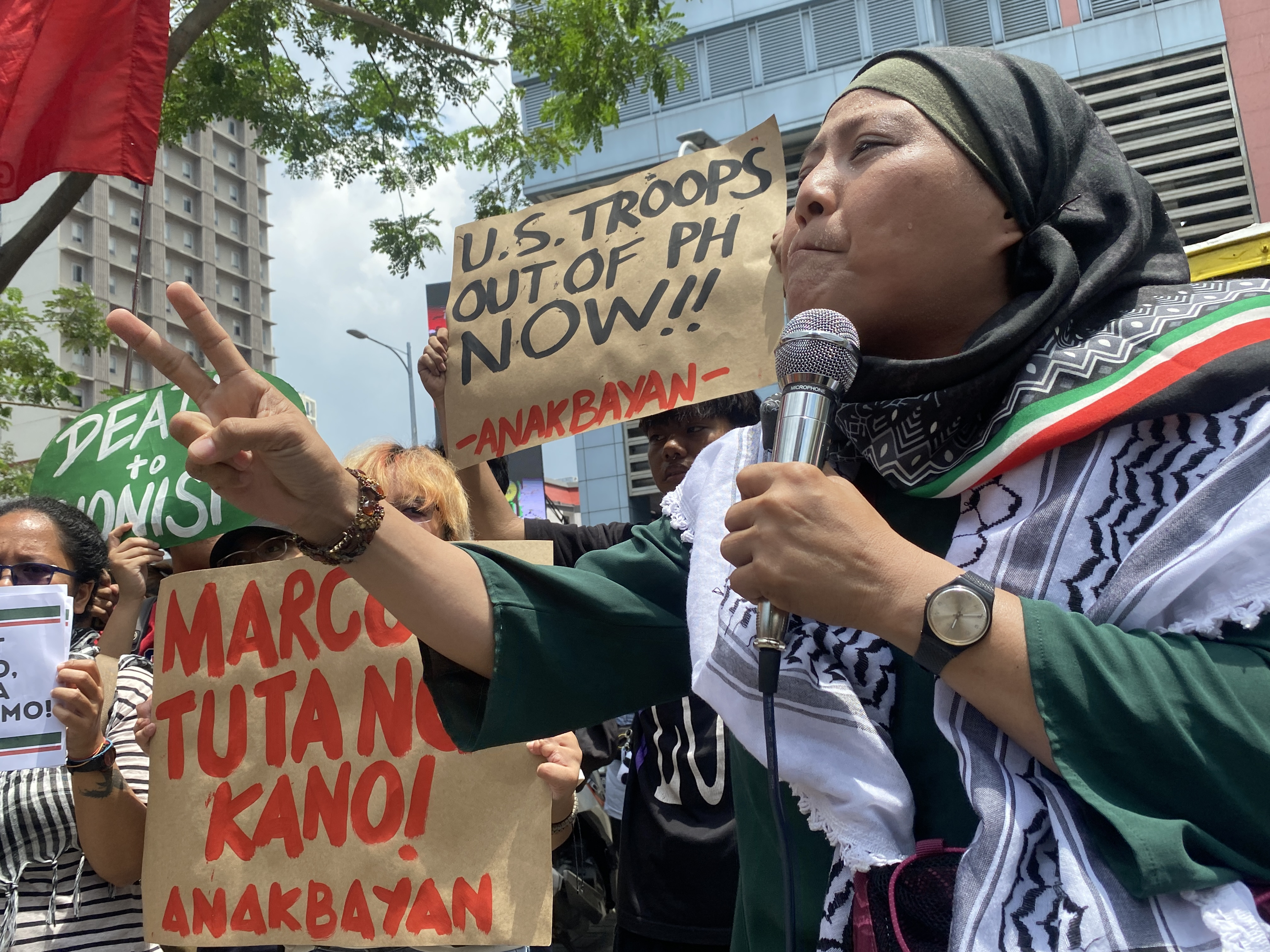
Lidasan speaking in front of the US Embassy Manila against the visit of US Defense Secretary Hegseth

Lidasan has been very critical and vocal on US Imperialism and its presence in both Palestine and the Philippines. She relates how Moros and Filipinos in general in the Philippines have also been victims of US imperialism, like in Palestine, especially among issues of displacement, land-grabbing, and bombings. She has expressed solidarity to fight for genuine liberation.

== 2025 Senate run ==
Lidasan was revealed as part of the Makabayan Senatoriable slate on September 24, 2024. She announced her candidacy in Salam Compound, Brgy. Culiat, Quezon City, commemorating the Palimbang Massacre against Moros. She represents the plight of Filipino Moros and indigenous peoples in their struggle for self-determination. Her candidacy has been well-supported by IP groups.
