= 2025 Philippine Senate election =

35th Philippine senatorial election

- May 12, 2025

12 (of the 24) seats to the Senate of the Philippines 13 seats needed for a majority
- Registered: 69,673,653
- Turnout: 57,350,968 (82.20%, ▼0.78pp)
Alliance	Alyansa	DuterTen	KiBam
Seats won	6	3+2 guests	2
Popular vote	142,193,487	119,817,018	36,315,128
Percentage	33.18	27.96	8.48
Alliance	Oposisyon ng Bayan	Riding-in-tandem Team	Nacionalista (Note: There were 4 Nacionalista candidates in this election. Two (Pia Cayetano and Camille Villar) ran under the Alyansa ticket, another (Ariel Querubin) ran under the Riding-in-tandem Team with Bonifacio Bosita, and the other (Imee Marcos) was originally with Alyansa, but removed herself from the ticket, then was named a guest candidate of DuterTen (along with Villar). Cayetano, Villar and Marcos each won. The figures here are for Marcos; Cayetano and Villar's totals are included in the Alyansa totals while Querubin's totals are included in the Riding-in-tandem Team.)
Seats won	0	0	1
Popular vote	28,001,064	13,755,954	13,339,227
Percentage	6.53	3.21	3.11

- Composition of the Senate by party after the election, with the seats up for election inside the box.
Senate President before election
Francis Escudero
NPC
Elected Senate President
Francis Escudero
NPC

The 35th election of members to the Senate of the Philippines was held on May 12, 2025, within the 2025 Philippine general election. The seats of the 12 senators elected in 2019 were contested in this election. The senators who will be elected in this election will serve until 2031, joining the winners of the 2022 election to form the Senate's delegation to the 20th Congress of the Philippines, with the senators elected in 2022 serving until 2028.

The election was shaped by several key issues, including employment and food security, concerns over the quality of public services such as healthcare, water, and education, and the demand for stronger anti-corruption measures and government accountability. Additionally, the impeachment of vice president Sara Duterte and the arrest of former president Rodrigo Duterte heightened political tensions, particularly between the Marcos and Duterte families.

The ruling administration of president Bongbong Marcos formed the Alyansa para sa Bagong Pilipinas, composed of the Partido Federal ng Pilipinas (PFP), Lakas, Nacionalista, National Unity Party (NUP), and the Nationalist People's Coalition (NPC), to contest the election. The PDP–Laban, aligned with former president Duterte and the vice president, endorsed DuterTen. In the traditional opposition, Bam Aquino and Francis Pangilinan ran together under the Liberal-backed KiBam umbrella, whereas Makabayan fielded a full slate branded as the Oposisyon ng Bayan. The Alyansa won six seats against the DuterTen's three, plus two guest candidates, while both KiBam candidates won.

In the Senate presidential election, Francis Escudero defeated fellow NPC member Tito Sotto to keep the Senate presidency.

== Background ==
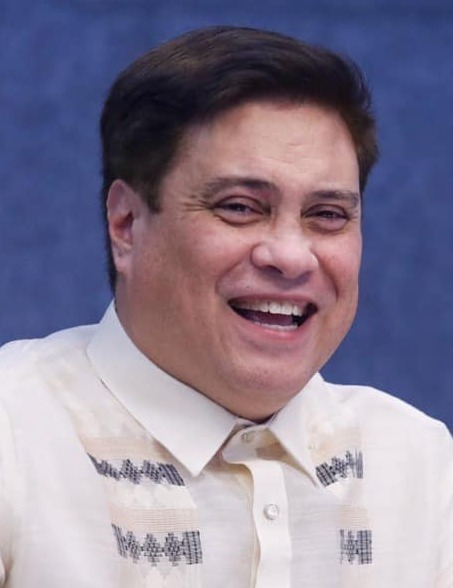
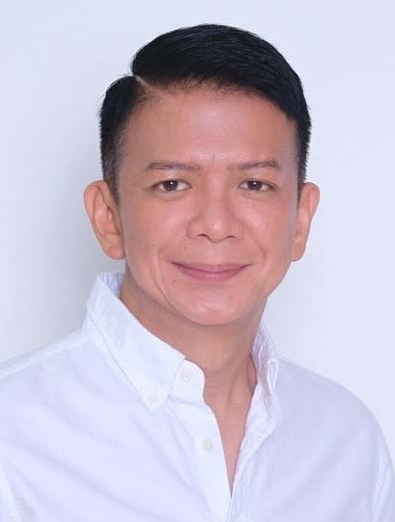
Migz Zubiri served as Senate president until his resignation on May 20, 2024, after which Francis Escudero took over.

In the 2022 election, the UniTeam, backing the candidacies of eventual president Bongbong Marcos and vice president Sara Duterte, won a plurality of seats in the Senate of the Philippines. Leading up to the opening of the 19th Congress, Cynthia Villar and Migz Zubiri, both having run under UniTeam, were viewed as the frontrunners to succeed Senate President Tito Sotto, who left the Senate after being term-limited. (Note: Sotto would run as Ping Lacson's Vice President, and lose. Both would return to the senate in the midterm, under Alyansa.) After Zubiri presumptively earned enough votes to be elected Senate president and negotiations for a term-sharing agreement failed, Villar withdrew from the contest, leaving Zubiri unopposed for the Senate presidency.

Zubiri's term as Senate president was marked by speculation of efforts to unseat him. Such speculation was confirmed by Senator Imee Marcos, who stated that there were plans to oust Zubiri from the Senate presidency, attributing such efforts to pressure that "came from outside the Senate". On May 20, 2024, Zubiri resigned the Senate presidency after 15 senators expressed their support to oust him from the post. Senator Francis Escudero was nominated as his successor and was elected without objection.

While in government after UniTeam's large victories in the election, Duterte remarked that the UniTeam had already "served its purpose" but claimed that the alliance was still "intact". Following mounting tensions between the Marcos and Duterte political clans, Duterte resigned from her roles as Secretary of Education and co-vice chairperson of the National Task Force to End Local Communist Armed Conflict. Political observers saw Duterte's resignation from her positions in the Marcos administration as a confirmation of the collapse of the UniTeam. Some labeled Duterte as a potential "leader of the opposition", a label that she would reject, claiming that she was "still friends" with Marcos.

Political scientist Julio C. Teehankee observed that a broad united coalition is unlikely to form in 2025 given that the Liberal Party, the traditional political opposition since 2016, has more in common with the ruling Marcos administration and noted that "there is little value in debating" which political faction is the true opposition, noting the varied motivations for opposing an incumbent government.

== Electoral system ==
The Philippines has a 24-member Senate elected at-large. Every three years since 1995, 12 seats are contested. For 2025, the seats last elected in 2019 will be contested. Each voter has 12 votes, of which one can vote for one to twelve candidates, or a multiple non-transferable vote; the twelve candidates with the most votes are elected.

Senators are limited to serving two consecutive terms, although they are eligible for a third (and succeeding) non-consecutive term. Only half of the seats are up in every senatorial election. The winning senators will succeed those elected in 2019, and will join those elected in 2022 to form the 20th Congress.

Each party or coalition endorses a slate of candidates, typically not exceeding a 12-person ticket. A party may also choose to invite "guest candidates" to complete its slate. The party may even include, with the candidates' consent, independent candidates and candidates from other parties as the party's guest candidates. Parties also may form coalitions to endorse a multi-party slate of candidates.

Winning candidates are proclaimed by the Commission on Elections (COMELEC), sitting as the National Board of Canvassers (NBOC). The NBOC usually proclaims senators-elect by batches, if that candidate can no longer fall to worse than twelfth place in the tally. Post-proclamation disputes are handled by the Senate Electoral Tribunal, a body composed of six senators and three justices from the Supreme Court.

== Participating parties ==
In both chambers of Congress, members are organized into "blocs", akin to parliamentary groups elsewhere. In keeping with the traditions of the Third Philippine Republic which was under a two-party system, there are two main blocs, the majority and minority blocs; this is although the country is now in a multi-party system. Those who voted for the Senate president are from the majority bloc, while those who did not (if there are more than two candidates for the Senate presidency) will vote amongst themselves on who will be the minority bloc. Those who belong to neither bloc shall be the independent minority bloc. Members can also be from the independent bloc. Each bloc can have members from multiple parties. Only the majority and minority blocs have voting privileges in committees.

In the 19th Congress, the majority bloc is composed of members who voted for Escudero for Senate president.

Parties in the Senate at on election day
Party	Current seats			Bloc membership			Political affiliation	
Party	Up	Not up	Total	Majority	Minority	Other	2022	2025
NPC	1	4	5 / 24	Most	None	Some	Reporma–NPC	Alyansa
Nacionalista	4	1	5 / 24	Most	One	None	n/a	Alyansa
PDP–Laban	2	1	3 / 24	All	None	None	TAP	DuterTen
Akbayan	0	1	1 / 24	None	One	None	TRoPa	KiBam
Lakas	1	0	1 / 24	One	None	None	UniTeam	Alyansa
PFP	1	0	1 / 24	One	None	None	UniTeam	Alyansa
PMP	0	1	1 / 24	One	None	None	UniTeam	—N/a
UNA	1	0	1 / 24	None	None	One	—N/a	—N/a
Independent	1	4	5 / 24	Most	None	Some	—N/a	
Vacant	1	0	1 / 24	—N/a				
Total	12	12	24 / 24					

These parties have put up at least one candidate in the election:

- Democratic Party of the Philippines (DPP)
- Katipunan ng Kamalayang Kayumanggi (KKK)
- Katipunan ng Nagkakaisang Pilipino (KANP)
- Kilusang Bagong Lipunan (KBL)
- Lakas–CMD (Lakas)
- Liberal Party (LP)
- Makabayan
- Nacionalista Party (NP)
- Nationalist People's Coalition (NPC)
- PDP–Laban (PDP)
- Partido Demokratiko Sosyalista ng Pilipinas (PDSP)
- Partido Federal ng Pilipinas (PFP)
- Partido Lakas ng Masa (PLM)
- Partido Maharlika (PM)
- Partido Pilipino sa Pagbabago (PPP)
- Reform PH Party (Reform PH)
- Workers' and Peasants' Party (WPP)

== Coalitions ==
This section describes the events prior to the campaign period.

=== Alyansa para sa Bagong Pilipinas ===
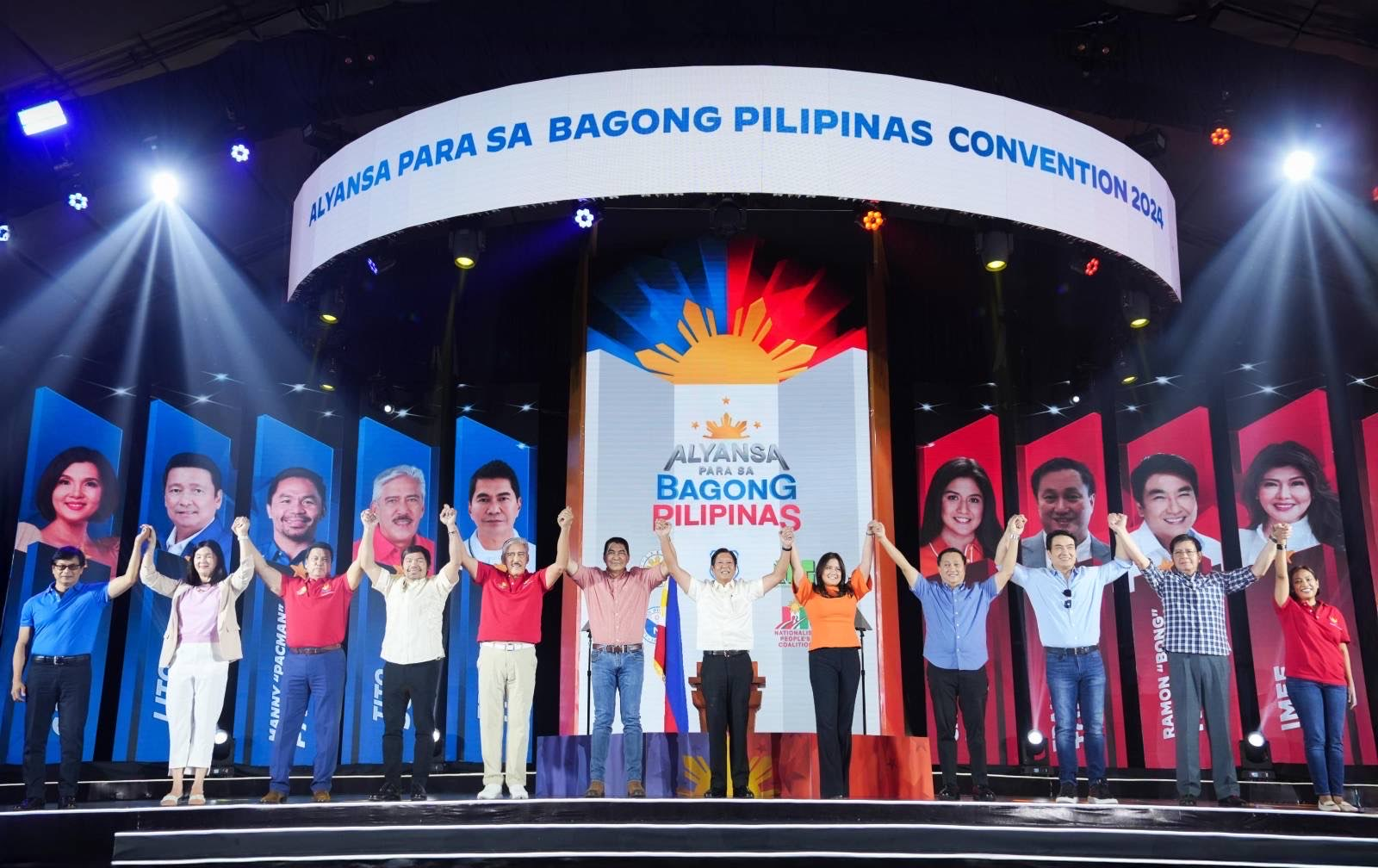
Alyansa-backed candidates with President Marcos at the alliance convention on September 26, 2024

On May 8, 2024, the Partido Federal ng Pilipinas (PFP) and Lakas–CMD signed an alliance agreement at the Manila Polo Club in Makati to form the Alyansa para sa Bagong Pilipinas (English: Alliance for the New Philippines) for the 2025 general elections. House Speaker Martin Romualdez remarked that the formation of the alliance created the "most powerful political force in our country today", noting the positioning of the PFP as the de facto ruling party in the country and Lakas' status as the largest political party in the House of Representatives.

Romualdez also implied that the coalition plans to include "all major parties", including the Nacionalista Party, which began negotiations with the alliance on July 2. President Marcos remarked that the alliance aims to be based "not on political expediency but on ideology" that focuses on unity and a new Philippines. Two parties would sign alliance agreements with the coalition: the Nationalist People's Coalition on May 19, and the National Unity Party on June 29. The Nacionalista Party formally entered the coalition on August 8.

On May 10, former Senator Manny Pacquiao announced his senatorial candidacy as a member of the alliance while remaining a member of PROMDI. Reelectionist Senator Imee Marcos, the sister of the president and PFP chairman, noted that she was unsure of her inclusion in the coalition, though the entry of the Nacionalista Party in the alliance ensured her inclusion in its ticket. Party leaders under the alliance met on August 19; on the same day, Erwin Tulfo noted that the administration "still has no final senatorial lineup".

On September 26, President Marcos announced the administration's twelve senatorial bets during an event at the Philippine International Convention Center in Pasay. Although Imee Marcos, the president's sister, was introduced as part of the slate, she stated that she would not be joining the slate and would instead be running as an independent. Despite her statement, she was never formally dropped from the slate, and was even shown campaigning with the alliance at the start of the campaign season.

=== PDP–Laban ===
At the party's national council held on April 19, 2024, at the Nustar Resort and Casino in Cebu City, former President Rodrigo Duterte endorsed the reelection bids of incumbent Senators Ronald dela Rosa, Bong Go, and Francis Tolentino (who later left to join Alyansa), as well as the bid of actor Phillip Salvador as part of the party's slate for the election. PDP–Laban also renamed itself into the "PDP–Laban", dropping the "Lakas ng Bayan" from its name. On June 26, Vice President Sara Duterte confirmed the elder Duterte's bid for the Senate, along with that of her brothers Paolo Duterte, the incumbent representative for Davao City's 1st district, and Sebastian Duterte, the incumbent mayor of Davao City.

In response to the possibility of an alliance between the ruling Marcos administration and the Liberal Party, dela Rosa affirmed that the Dutertes would lead the opposition in such case. On September, at the PDP national assembly, the party formed an alliance with Partido para sa Demokratikong Reporma, Pederalismo ng Dugong Dakilang Samahan and the Mayor Rodrigo Roa Duterte-National Executive Coordinating Committee.

During the filing of candidacies, Rodrigo Duterte ran as mayor of Davao City, his son Sebastian running as vice mayor, and another son Paolo running for representative from Davao City's 1st district. Meanwhile, Go, dela Rosa, and Salvador jointly filed to run for senator. Duterte administration officials Raul Lambino and Jimmy Bondoc also filed their candidacies to run for senator also under PDP. In a January 30, 2025 meeting at Davao City, former president Duterte endorsed all PDP senatorial candidates, including Jayvee Hinlo, and independents Apollo Quiboloy and Rodante Marcoleta. On the proclamation rally held at San Juan, the party endorsed all eight aforementioned candidates, and independent candidate Vic Rodriguez, President Marcos's erstwhile ad interim executive secretary and former campaign spokesperson.

=== KiBam (Kiko Pangilinan and Bam Aquino) ===
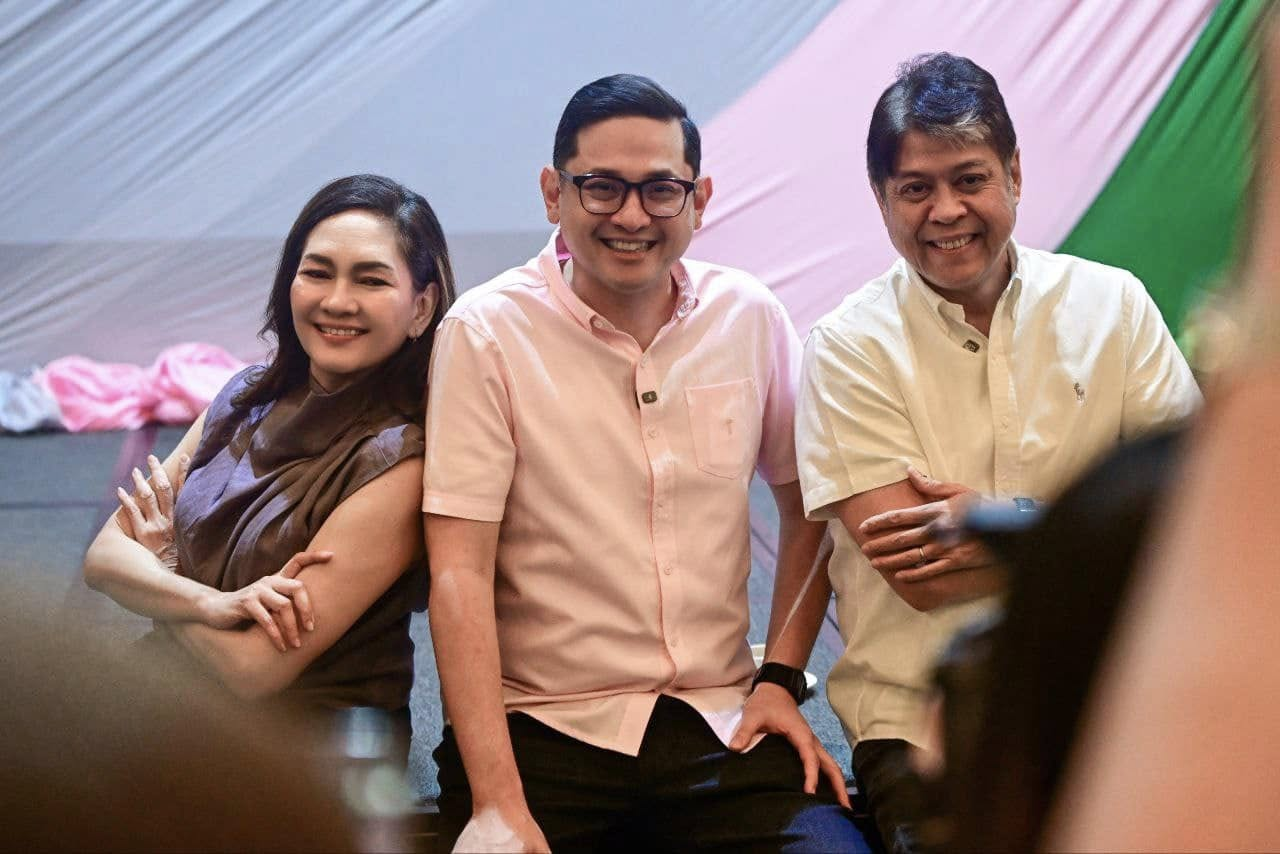
Senator Risa Hontiveros (left) managed the joint campaigns of former senators Bam Aquino (center) and Kiko Pangilinan (right).

In the 2022 Senate election, senator Risa Hontiveros of Akbayan became the only candidate of the opposition Team Robredo–Pangilinan (TRoPa) to be re-elected. (Note: Senators Francis Escudero and Joel Villanueva, while re-elected, ran as guest candidates of the Team Robredo–Pangilinan opposition alliance, but did not endorse Robredo.) After vice president Leni Robredo left office, she became the de facto leader of the opposition against Marcos and Duterte. Hontiveros joined the Senate's minority bloc alongside Koko Pimentel. She rose into prominence as she led investigations against Philippine offshore gaming operators.

At a forum of the Foreign Correspondents Association of the Philippines on February 22, 2024, Liberal Party spokesperson and former senator Leila de Lima announced that the party plans to field former senators Bam Aquino and Francis Pangilinan (nicknamed "Kiko"), as well as human rights lawyer Chel Diokno of the Katipunan ng Nagkakaisang Pilipino (KANP), as its senatorial candidates in the upcoming election. Aquino confirmed his bid for the Senate on May 14 after being appointed as the chairman of KANP. While former vice president and 2022 presidential candidate Leni Robredo was floated as a possible candidate, Robredo ruled out a bid for the Senate and instead announced a run for the mayoralty of Naga, Camarines Sur, though the party remained keen in drafting Robredo for its Senate ticket.

Former Senator Antonio Trillanes, who ran under TRoPa in the 2022 election, proposed that the Liberal Party and its allies "set aside sensitivities for a larger cause" and align with the Marcos administration in the Senate race to ensure "obliteration of the Duterte forces". Party president Edcel Lagman was also open to such arrangement. Political pundits suggest that such a coalition would provide the opposition with more resources during the campaign but may alienate "many groups in the opposition camp who are ideologically opposed to any alliance with other political groups". De Lima disapproved of Trillanes' proposal, emphasizing the need to adhere to the party's principles as a political opposition and identity as "the alternative to the Marcos bloc and the Duterte bloc". Senator Risa Hontiveros concurred with de Lima, stating that while she respects Trillanes's proposition, such an alliance would not form a "genuine opposition".

On September 20, the Liberal Party announced Pangilinan's candidacy for senator. Aquino and Pangilinan then launched their "Mga Kaibigan" (Friends) campaign on October 16 at the Bahay ng Alumni at the University of the Philippines Diliman, with Hontiveros serving as their campaign manager. At a campaign event in Bulacan, in November 2024, their campaign adopted the name "KiBam", a portmanteau of their names.

=== Oposisyon ng Bayan (Makabayan) ===
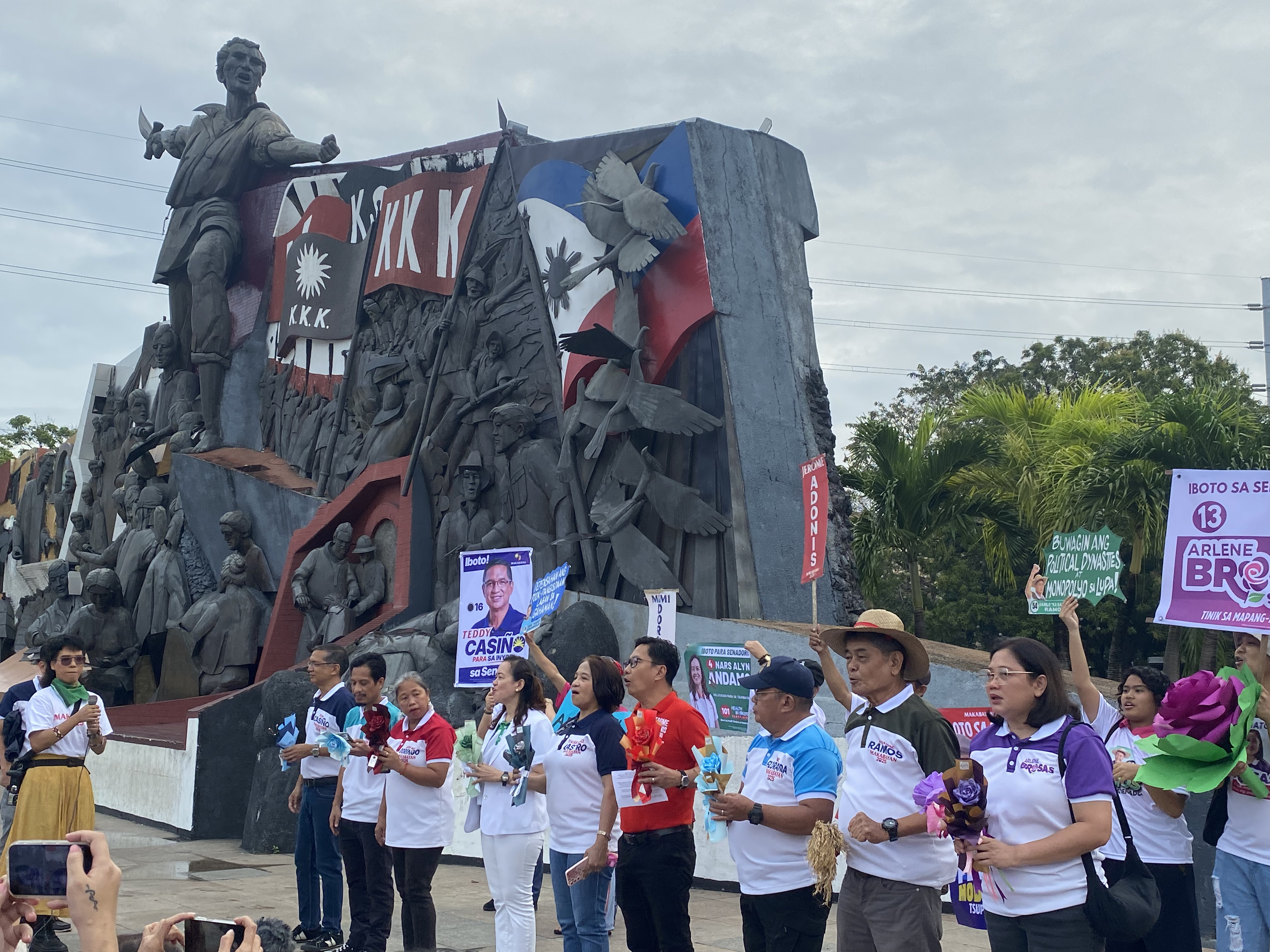
Makabayan-backed candidates at the first day of campaign on February 11, 2025

In an interview during the commemoration of the 42nd anniversary of the Alliance of Concerned Teachers on June 26, 2024, term-limited Representative France Castro announced her bid for the Senate in response to open letters from teachers encouraging her to seek a seat in the chamber in 2025. Castro added that the Makabayan coalition plans to form a 12-member senate slate for the 2025 elections with the aim to form an "alternative slate" to the ruling government. The coalition aims to field candidates from marginalized sectors and vowed not to field candidates from political dynasties or influential families. Castro and Representative Arlene Brosas also stated that they were open to form alliances with "true opposition" groups and have entered negotiations with other opposition groups such as the Liberal Party. The slate will be named as "Oposisyon ng Bayan" (transl. People's Opposition). Brosas later announced her Senate bid on July 16.

Eight more members of the Makabayan senatorial slate independently announced their candidacies in July and August 2024, including former representatives Teodoro Casiño and Liza Maza and leaders from various sectoral grassroots organizations. Makabayan formally announced its ten-member senatorial slate on August 26, during its National Heroes Day event at the Liwasang Bonifacio in Manila. On September 24, Moro activist Amirah Lidasan announced her run as the 11th Makabayan senatorial candidate. On October 4, all eleven members of its senatorial slate filed their respective candidacies.

== Term-limited incumbents ==
The following are serving a successive six-year term and are barred from seeking reelection.

1. Nancy Binay (UNA), running for mayor of Makati
  On January 20, 2024, Binay stated in an interview on DWIZ-AM that she was "50 percent sure" that she would run for mayor of Makati upon the end of her term as senator. She confirmed her bid for the mayoralty on September 9. The incumbent mayor and Binay's sister Abigail is running for senator under the Nationalist People's Coalition. Nancy defeated Abigail's husband Luis to become mayor-elect.
2. Koko Pimentel (Nacionalista), running for House representative from Marikina's 1st district
  On October 6, 2024, Pimentel filed to run for representative in Marikina's 1st district, facing off against incumbent mayor Marcelino Teodoro, husband of the incumbent representative Marjorie Ann, after a failed attempt to form an alliance with the local administration. With the Dutertes using the PDP–Laban name, Pimentel ran under the Nacionalista Party. Teodoro emerged with a landslide victory, but was not immediately proclaimed due to a pending disqualification case. The commission dismissed Teodoro's disqualification case and was proclaimed as the winner.
3. Grace Poe (Independent), not running
  While Poe is not running, she has endorsed FPJ Panday Bayanihan, named after her father Fernando Poe Jr. (otherwise known by his initials "FPJ"), and of which her son Brian is the #1 nominee, in the party-list election. The party won one seat in the election, earning Brian a seat.
4. Cynthia Villar (Nacionalista), running for House representative from Las Piñas's at-large district
  On July 31, 2024, Villar expressed her interest in running for public office in Las Piñas, either as mayor or House representative for the city's at-large district. Villar was then later seen as running for the lower house. Villar then filed to run as House representative, while her daughter Camille, the incumbent House representative, is running for senator. Villar lost the congressional election to independent councilor Mark Anthony Santos.

=== Mid-term vacancies ===
1. Sonny Angara (LDP), appointed as secretary of education
  On July 2, 2024, President Bongbong Marcos appointed Angara, a term-limited senator, as secretary of education. On July 18, Angara resigned from the Senate a day before assuming office, leaving his seat vacant until his successor is elected in the regular election.

== Marginal seats ==
These are the marginal seats that had a winning margin of 5% or less against the 13th placed candidate in the 2019 election, in ascending order via margin:

Incumbent	Party	2019 margin	2025 results
Nancy Binay	UNA	0.41%	Incumbent term-limited
Bong Revilla	Lakas	0.66%	Incumbent lost reelection
Koko Pimentel	Nacionalista	0.75%	Incumbent term-limited
Francis Tolentino	PFP	2.53%	Incumbent lost reelection
Imee Marcos	Nacionalista	3.32%	Incumbent won reelection

== Candidates ==
The filing of candidacies was from October 1 to 8, 2024, at the Manila Hotel. A total of 184 people registered to run for senator. One withdrew his candidacy. More than a week later, the commission released an initial list of 66 approved candidates. In November, the COMELEC declared 117 nuisance candidates, 14 of which filed motion for reconsideration. This includes 2022 election candidate and social media personality Francis Leo Marcos. In December, the COMELEC announced 66 names are on their final list, having received no temporary restraining orders from the Supreme Court.

Party / Ticket	Alyansa	DuterTen	KiBam	Others	Total
Aksyon	0	0	0	2+1	2
Bunyog	0	0	0	2	1
DPP	0	0	0	1	1
KANP	0	0	1	0	1
Katipunan	0	0	0	1	1
KBL	0	0	0	1	1
Lakas	2	0	0	0	2
Liberal	0	0	1	0	1
Makabayan	0	0	0	11	11
Nacionalista	2	0+2	0	2	4
NPC	3	0	0	0	3
PDP–Laban	0	6	0	0	5
PDSP	0	0	0	1	1
PFP	3	0	0	0	3
PLM	0	0	0	2	2
PM	0	0	0	2	2
PPP	0	0	0	1	1
RP	0	0	0	1	1
WPP	0	0	0	1	2
Independent	1	4	0	15	19
Total	11	10+2	2	40+1	64

=== Administration ticket ===
Alyansa para sa Bagong Pilipinas
#	Name	Party
1.	Benhur Abalos	PFP
9.	Abigail Binay	NPC
11.	Bong Revilla	Lakas
18.	Pia Cayetano	Nacionalista
33.	Panfilo Lacson	Independent
35.	Lito Lapid	NPC
50.	Manny Pacquiao	PFP
59.	Tito Sotto	NPC
61.	Francis Tolentino	PFP
63.	Erwin Tulfo	Lakas
66.	Camille Villar	Nacionalista

=== Opposition tickets ===
DuterTen
#	Name	Party
10.	Jimmy Bondoc	PDP–Laban
22.	Ronald dela Rosa	PDP–Laban
28.	Bong Go	PDP–Laban
30.	Jayvee Hinlo	PDP–Laban
34.	Raul Lambino	PDP–Laban
38.	Rodante Marcoleta	Independent
39.	Imee Marcos (Note: Guest candidate)	Nacionalista
42.	Richard Mata	Independent
53.	Apollo Quiboloy	Independent
56.	Vic Rodriguez	Independent
58.	Phillip Salvador	PDP–Laban
66.	Camille Villar	Nacionalista

KiBam
#	Name	Party
5.	Bam Aquino	KANP
51.	Kiko Pangilinan	Liberal

Oposisyon ng Bayan
#	Name	Party
2.	Jerome Adonis	Makabayan
4.	Jocelyn Andamo	Makabayan
6.	Ronnel Arambulo	Makabayan
13.	Arlene Brosas	Makabayan
16.	Teodoro Casiño	Makabayan
17.	France Castro	Makabayan
23.	Mimi Doringo	Makabayan
26.	Mody Floranda	Makabayan
37.	Amirah Lidasan	Makabayan
44.	Liza Maza	Makabayan
54.	Danilo Ramos	Makabayan

=== Other tickets ===
Aksyon Demokratiko
#	Name	Party
27.	Marc Gamboa	Independent
36.	Wilbert T. Lee (withdrew)	Aksyon
49.	Willie Ong (withdrew)	Aksyon

Partido Lakas ng Masa
#	Name	Party
21.	Leody de Guzman	PLM
25.	Luke Espiritu	PLM

Partido Maharlika
#	Name	Party
24.	Arnel Escobal	PM
60.	Michael Tapado	PM

Riding-in-tandem Team
#	Name	Party
12.	Bonifacio Bosita	Independent
52.	Ariel Querubin	Nacionalista

Workers' and Peasants' Party
#	Name	Party
43.	Sonny Matula	WPP
47.	Subair Mustapha	WPP

Non-independents not in tickets
#	Name	Party
7.	Ernesto Arellano	Katipunan
14.	Roy Cabonegro	DPP
15.	Allen Capuyan	PPP
19.	David D'Angelo	Bunyog
29.	Norberto Gonzales	PDSP
31.	Gregorio Honasan	RP
32.	Relly Jose Jr.	KBL

Independents
#	Name	Party
3.	Wilson Amad	Independent
8.	Roberto Ballon	Independent
20.	Angelo de Alban	Independent
40.	Norman Marquez	Independent
41.	Eric Martinez	Independent
45.	Heidi Mendoza	Independent
46.	Jose Montemayor Jr.	Independent
48.	Jose Jessei Olivar	Independent
55.	Willie Revillame	Independent
57.	Nur-Ana Sahidulla	Independent
62.	Ben Tulfo	Independent
64.	Mar Valbuena	Independent
65.	Leandro Verceles	Independent

=== Withdrawals and injunctions ===
On January 14, 2025, Chavit Singson announced his withdrawal as a candidate. On the same day, the Supreme Court issued temporary restraining orders preventing the COMELEC from excluding certain aspirants on the ballot, including senatorial aspirant Subair Mustapha. The COMELEC acquiesced to the court's order, and ordered the reprinting of ballots that did not have Mustapha's name on the ballot. Singson made his withdrawal official on January 16; the COMELEC then decided to remove his name on the ballot, as they would have to reprint new ballots anyway. On January 21, the Supreme Court released more injunctions, including adding Francis Leo Marcos on the ballot as a senatorial candidate. Marcos himself withdrew on January 23. The COMELEC then reprinted ballots on January 27, still with 66 names, but with Mustapha's name on it, and without Marcos' and Singson's names.

On February 10, at the eve of campaigning, WIlbert T. Lee withdrew, citing lack of political machinery as the reason. The commission, after receiving Lee's withdrawal said the printing of ballots will not be affected as Lee would remain on the ballot, and votes for him will be considered as stray votes. On February 13, Willie Ong also announced his withdrawal, citing ill health. Ong's wife Liza filed paperwork to make her husband's official on February 21.

== Opinion polling ==
Opinion polling in the Philippines is conducted by Social Weather Stations (SWS), Pulse Asia, OCTA Research, and other pollsters.

=== Per candidate ===
The top 18 candidates with the highest favorability in each poll are listed below, where the top 12 are above the "black line". For a comprehensive list of all individuals included in the surveys, see the main article.

==== After start of campaign period for locally-elected candidates ====
#	Mar 31 – Apr 7, 2025		Apr 7–12, 2025		Apr 10–16, 2025		Apr 11–15, 2025		Apr 11–15, 2025		Apr 12–14, 2025		Apr 20–24, 2025		Apr 20–24, 2025		Apr 23–30, 2025		Apr 26 – May 1, 2025		Apr 28 – May 3, 2025		May 1, 2025		May 2–6, 2025		May 6–9, 2025	
#	WR Numero		Arkipelago Analytics		OCTA		SWS		The Center		DZRH		OCTA		Pulse Asia		WR Numero		Arkipelago Analytics		The Center		Publicus Asia		SWS		Pulse Asia	
#	Name	%	Name	%	Name	%	Name	%	Name	%	Name	%	Name	%	Name	%	Name	%	Name	%	Name	%	Name	%	Name	%	Name	%
1	E. Tulfo	43.4	Go	64	Go	64.2	Go	45	Go	57	Go	63.2	Go	56.8	Go	62.2	E. Tulfo	48.7	Go	63	Go	59	Go	42	E. Tulfo	45	Go	59.5
2	Go	41.9	E. Tulfo	55	E. Tulfo	61.2	E. Tulfo	43	Sotto	54.3	dela Rosa	50.7	E. Tulfo	52.7	E. Tulfo	42.4	Go	45.3	E. Tulfo	55	Sotto	54	Aquino	41	Go	43	E. Tulfo	48.7
3	dela Rosa	38.7	dela Rosa	49	B. Tulfo	45.4	Lapid	34	dela Rosa	46	E. Tulfo	50.4	Sotto	42.3	Sotto	41.1	Sotto	37	dela Rosa	47	dela Rosa	49.3	Pangilinan	36	Sotto	37	Sotto	44.1
4	Cayetano	34.7	Sotto	44	Sotto	43.3	Sotto	33	Cayetano	44.5	Lacson	42.9	dela Rosa	40.8	dela Rosa	41.0	dela Rosa	36.8	B. Tulfo	42	E. Tulfo	47.6	dela Rosa	32	Lapid	34	dela Rosa	42.9
5	Lapid	34.1	Cayetano	43	dela Rosa	40.4	Cayetano	33	E. Tulfo	44	Sotto	41.8	B. Tulfo	40.2	Revilla	35.6	Cayetano	36.6	Sotto	42	Cayetano	45.7	Lacson	32	B. Tulfo	34	Lapid	38.0
6	B. Tulfo	32.1	B. Tulfo	42	Lacson	39.7	dela Rosa	32	Binay	40.7	B. Tulfo	40.1	Cayetano	39.1	Lacson	33.8	B. Tulfo	35.2	Cayetano	41	Binay	43	E. Tulfo	28	Lacson	32	Cayetano	34.3
7	Lacson	31.9	Lapid	41	Cayetano	39.5	Revilla	31	B. Tulfo	39	Villar	39.5	Revilla	38.1	B. Tulfo	33.5	Lapid	34.8	Villar	40.5	Tolentino	42.7	Sotto	28	Binay	31	Lacson	33.1
8	Binay	31.8	Revilla	40.5	Revilla	38.7	B. Tulfo	31	Villar	37.9	Lapid	38.9	Binay	37.6	Lapid	32.2	Lacson	33.7	Revilla	39	Villar	40	Cayetano	28	dela Rosa	31	Aquino	32.8
9	Sotto	29.8	Revillame	39	Lapid	36.9	Binay	29	Tolentino	37.5	Cayetano	36.3	Lapid	35.6	Binay	30.2	Binay	31.7	Lapid	38.7	Marcos	39.9	B. Tulfo	23	Villar	30	Revilla	32.3
10	Revilla	27.4	Villar	38.5	Binay	35.7	Villar	28	Lacson	36	Revilla	34.3	Lacson	34.3	Cayetano	29.9	Villar	29.8	Revillame	38	B. Tulfo	39	Marcoleta	23	Cayetano	30	Binay	30.5
11	Villar	26.7	Lacson	38	Aquino	32.3	Lacson	26	Marcos	35.8	Binay	33.8	Villar	31.9	Revillame	28.6	Revilla	29.5	Marcoleta	34	Lacson	38	Marcos	23	Revilla	29	Marcoleta	28.9
12	Aquino	26.4	Binay	37	Villar	30.4	Pacquiao	25	Lapid	32	Marcos	31.7	Aquino	31.4	Villar	28.3	Aquino	28.5	Aquino	33.5	Marcoleta	35	Pacquiao	22	Marcos	29	B. Tulfo	28.9
13	Pangilinan	25.2	Pacquiao	35	Pacquiao	30.3	Revillame	24	Marcoleta	30.5	Aquino	31.1	Revillame	30.4	Pacquiao	28.3	Marcos	26.4	Marcos	33	Honasan	34	Tolentino	21	Pacquiao	24	Pacquiao	28.4
14	Pacquiao	24.2	Marcos	33	Pangilinan	30.3	Marcos	24	Honasan	29.6	Pacquiao	30.2	Pacquiao	29.1	Aquino	25.4	Pacquiao	26.1	Binay	32	Revillame	33.5	Mendoza	20	Revillame	24	Marcos	27.6
15	Salvador	20.4	Marcoleta	32.7	Revillame	29.0	Aquino	21	Revillame	27	Marcoleta	30.0	Marcos	28.9	Marcos	24.7	Pangilinan	24.5	Lacson	32	Bondoc	31	Binay	18	Abalos	24	Villar	27.6
16	Marcos	19.5	Salvador	31.5	Abalos	28.8	Pangilinan	21	Revilla	25	Salvador	27.9	Abalos	28.5	Salvador	23.7	Revillame	22.6	Pacquiao	32	Lapid	30	Bondoc	17	Aquino	23	Salvador	26.5
17	Revillame	19.2	Aquino	30.5	Marcos	27.9	Salvador	18	Pacquiao	23	Pangilinan	26.1	Marcoleta	27.8	Marcoleta	23.0	Abalos	20.7	Salvador	32	Revilla	27	Rodriguez	17	Pangilinan	21	Pangilinan	25.1
18	Abalos	18.2	Bondoc	30	Tolentino	27.7	Abalos	18	Abalos	23	Abalos	25.8	Pangilinan	26.3	Abalos	22.9	Marcoleta	20.4	Pangilinan	29	Pacquiao	23.4	Villar	17	Marcoleta	17	Revillame	24.1
19	Marcoleta	17.7	Pangilinan	29	Salvador	24.4	Honasan	13	Salvador	22	Revillame	25.7	Salvador	25.3	Pangilinan	19.8	Salvador	17.2	Bondoc	29	Salvador	23	Honasan	15	Salvador	16	Abalos	23.7
20	Bosita	15.5	Honasan	27	Marcoleta	19.3	Marcoleta	13	Bondoc	21	Bondoc	23.9	Tolentino	25.2	Bondoc	16.6	Honasan	16.1	Honasan	27	Abalos	23	Espiritu	15	Bosita	16	Bondoc	20.5

==== After start of campaign period for nationally-elected candidates ====
#	Feb 15–19, 2025		Feb 17–22, 2025		Feb 20–26, 2025		Feb 22–28, 2025		Mar 8–10, 2025		Mar 15–20, 2025		Mar 15–20, 2025		Mar 15–21, 2025		Mar 18–24, 2025		Mar 22–29, 2025		Mar 23–29, 2025	
#	SWS		The Center		Pulse Asia		OCTA		DZRH		SWS		Publicus Asia		Arkipelago Analytics		OCTA		The Center		Pulse Asia	
#	Name	%	Name	%	Name	%	Name	%	Name	%	Name	%	Name	%	Name	%	Name	%	Name	%	Name	%
1	E. Tulfo	45	Sotto	56.5	Go	58.1	E. Tulfo	66	Go	55.9	Go	42	Go	45	Go	64.0	Go	64	Go	57.6	Go	61.9
2	Go	38	Go	55.3	E. Tulfo	56.6	Go	62	E. Tulfo	55.7	E. Tulfo	42	dela Rosa	35	E. Tulfo	59.8	E. Tulfo	61	Sotto	56.3	E. Tulfo	51.1
3	Lapid	36	E. Tulfo	54	Sotto	49.0	B. Tulfo	59	Lacson	46.4	B. Tulfo	34	Aquino	33	B. Tulfo	57.7	B. Tulfo	48	E. Tulfo	51	dela Rosa	48.7
4	Sotto	34	Lapid	48.1	Revilla	46.1	Revilla	51	Sotto	46.4	Sotto	34	Lacson	33	Sotto	49.0	Sotto	46	Cayetano	47	Sotto	44.2
5	B. Tulfo	34	Lacson	46	dela Rosa	44.3	Sotto	47	B. Tulfo	43.3	Lapid	33	Pangilinan	32	dela Rosa	48.4	Revilla	45	Lapid	46	Cayetano	37.5
6	Revilla	33	Revilla	45.7	Revillame	42.3	Binay	43	dela Rosa	41.4	Revilla	32	Sotto	29	Cayetano	48.0	Lapid	42	Lacson	43.3	Revilla	36.9
7	Cayetano	33	Cayetano	41	B. Tulfo	40.7	Lapid	43	Cayetano	40.9	Cayetano	31	E. Tulfo	29	Revilla	46.0	Lacson	42	Revilla	42.5	Lacson	36.0
8	Lacson	32	B. Tulfo	39.8	Pacquiao	39.9	Villar	40	Villar	40.6	Lacson	31	Cayetano	27	Revillame	39.5	Cayetano	41	Binay	38.7	Revillame	35.7
9	dela Rosa	32	Binay	35.5	Lapid	39.4	Pacquiao	40	Lapid	40.1	dela Rosa	30	Tolentino	23	Lapid	38.7	dela Rosa	38	Tolentino	37.5	B. Tulfo	35.4
10	Pacquiao	30	Pacquiao	35	Binay	37.6	Cayetano	30	Pacquiao	38.5	Revillame	28	B. Tulfo	22	Binay	38.4	Binay	37	dela Rosa	35	Binay	35.3
11	Binay	30	Tolentino	33.4	Cayetano	37.5	Revillame	30	Binay	37.8	Binay	27	Pacquiao	21	Villar	37.9	Villar	35	B. Tulfo	34.7	Lapid	33.3
12	Revillame	30	dela Rosa	32	Villar	36.6	Marcos	38	Revilla	36.8	Pacquiao	27	Marcoleta	21	Pacquiao	37.7	Pacquiao	29	Pacquiao	31.5	Pacquiao	32.0
13	Villar	29	Revillame	30	Lacson	35.8	Lacson	38	Aquino	33.5	Villar	27	Bondoc	18	Lacson	37.5	Revillame	29	Revillame	30.1	Salvador	30.9
14	Marcos	24	Villar	29	Marcos	30.9	Abalos	36	Marcos	32.2	Pangilinan	24	Marcos	17	Salvador	31.5	Abalos	29	Villar	28	Villar	29.0
15	Pangilinan	22	Marcos	25	Aquino	26.4	dela Rosa	35	Revillame	31.1	Aquino	21	Binay	17	Marcoleta	30.0	Aquino	28	Aquino	24.7	Aquino	28.6
16	Abalos	17	Abalos	21	Pangilinan	25.0	Tolentino	34	Abalos	27.5	Marcos	19	Mendoza	15	Marcos	29.9	Pangilinan	27	Pangilinan	24	Marcoleta	28.3
17	Aquino	16	Pangilinan	19	Abalos	23.0	Pangilinan	28	Pangilinan	25.9	Salvador	18	Rodriguez	15	Bondoc	29.5	Tolentino	27	Abalos	23	Marcos	27.6
18	Tolentino	15	Honasan	17	Salvador	20.7	Aquino	27	Tolentino	21.0	Abalos	17	Honasan	15	Honasan	27.9	Marcos	27	Honasan	22.7	Pangilinan	26.8

==== After filing of candidacies ====
#	Oct 16–17, 2024		Oct 29–31, 2024		Nov 10–16, 2024		Nov 25–Dec 1, 2024		Nov 26 – Dec 3, 2024		Nov 29 – Dec 3, 2024		Dec 7–9, 2024		Dec 12–18, 2024		Dec 16–22, 2024		Jan 17–20, 2025		Jan 18–25, 2025		Jan 25–31, 2025		Feb 10–18, 2025	
#	Publicus Asia		PEERS Agency		OCTA		The Center		Pulse Asia		Publicus Asia		DZRH		SWS		RMN–Oculum		SWS		Pulse Asia		OCTA		WR Numero	
#	Name	%	Name	%	Name	%	Name	%	Name	%	Name	%	Name	%	Name	%	Name	%	Name	%	Name	%	Name	%	Name	%
1	Ong	41	E. Tulfo	55.7	E. Tulfo	73	E. Tulfo	58	E. Tulfo	62.2	E. Tulfo	41	E. Tulfo	64.7	E. Tulfo	45	E. Tulfo	70.8	E. Tulfo	45	E. Tulfo	62.8	E. Tulfo	70	E. Tulfo	46.5
2	E. Tulfo	40	Lacson	47.6	B. Tulfo	66	T. Sotto	53.5	T. Sotto	59.2	Ong	39	T. Sotto	54.9	Revilla	33	T. Sotto	52.3	T. Sotto	38	Go	50.4	B. Tulfo	60	Lapid	37.1
3	T. Sotto	38	T. Sotto	46.0	T. Sotto	63	Lacson	51.8	Go	54.7	Lacson	39	B. Tulfo	50.3	Go	32	B. Tulfo	50.1	Lapid	37	T. Sotto	50.2	Go	58	Revilla	36.1
4	Lacson	38	Cayetano	45.4	Go	52	B. Tulfo	46.8	B. Tulfo	52.7	T. Sotto	37	Lacson	50.1	Cayetano	32	Revilla	49.2	Go	37	B. Tulfo	46.2	T. Sotto	52	Cayetano	35.8
5	Go	35	B. Tulfo	39.6	Revilla	49	Go	46.5	Cayetano	46.5	Go	37	Pacquiao	46.5	T. Sotto	31	Cayetano	46.9	Lacson	35	Cayetano	46.1	Revilla	49	T. Sotto	32.4
6	B. Tulfo	33	Ong	39.0	Cayetano	49	Cayetano	44.8	Pacquiao	45.0	Cayetano	32	Lapid	46.2	B. Tulfo	30	Pacquiao	46.3	B. Tulfo	34	Revilla	46.0	Revillame	48	Binay	32.3
7	Cayetano	33	Pacquiao	33.6	Lacson	47	Pacquiao	44	Lacson	44.1	B. Tulfo	31	Cayetano	44.7	Lacson	27	Go	44.4	Cayetano	33	Marcos	43.3	Lacson	48	B. Tulfo	32.1
8	Pacquiao	32	Villar	31.9	Marcos	41	Revilla	43.5	Revillame	43.6	dela Rosa	30	Revilla	42.4	Pacquiao	26	dela Rosa	43.8	Pacquiao	33	Lacson	42.4	Cayetano	46	Lacson	30.8
9	Pangilinan	30	Revilla	31.6	Pacquiao	38	Tolentino	43	Revilla	43.5	Pacquiao	29	Villar	40.7	Revillame	26	Binay	40.3	Binay	31	Revillame	41.9	Pacquiao	45	Go	30.0
10	Marcos	30	dela Rosa	31.2	Lapid	36	Villar	38	Binay	40.1	Pangilinan	28	Revillame	39.4	Binay	25	Lacson	39.2	dela Rosa	30	dela Rosa	41.2	Marcos	44	dela Rosa	29.5
11	Aquino	27	Abalos	30.9	Tolentino	32	Marcos	37	Lapid	39.2	Tolentino	28	Binay	38.0	Lapid	23	Villar	37.5	Revilla	29	Binay	41.1	Lapid	43	Pacquiao	26.9
12	dela Rosa	26	Honasan	30.4	Abalos	30	dela Rosa	36	Marcos	37.5	Aquino	27	dela Rosa	37.4	Villar	21	Revillame	36.2	Revillame	29	Pacquiao	40.6	Abalos	39	Revillame	26.5
13	Tolentino	23	Lapid	28.9	Binay	30	Abalos	33.5	dela Rosa	36.9	Marcos	26	Marcos	34.6	dela Rosa	21	Marcos	33.3	Pangilinan	29	Villar	38.4	Tolentino	38	Aquino	25.2
14	Revillame	21	Pangilinan	28.6	Villar	29	Ong	33	Villar	36.5	Revillame	19	Go	34.5	Marcos	21	Lapid	31.1	Marcos	28	Lapid	37.7	Binay	37	Pangilinan	24.9
15	Honasan	20	Marcos	28.1	Revillame	28	Binay	32	Pangilinan	33.1	Marcoleta	18	Abalos	31.8	Pangilinan	20	Honasan	28.1	Villar	26	Pangilinan	29.1	Villar	36	Villar	22.3
16	Binay	19	Aquino	27.6	Honasan	27	Pangilinan	30	Honasan	28.6	Honasan	18	Pangilinan	29.6	Abalos	17	Abalos	26.3	Aquino	20	Aquino	27.4	dela Rosa	36	Marcos	20.4
17	Lapid	18	Binay	27.6	dela Rosa	26	Lapid	29	Aquino	28.2	Lapid	17	Aquino	28.9	Aquino	17	Pangilinan	23.3	Ong	20	Honasan	25.2	Pangilinan	28	Ong	19.3
18	Villar	17	Go	26.9	Pangilinan	25	Honasan	29	Abalos	26.0	Binay	17	Ong	26.6	Honasan	15	Ong	22.5	Abalos	19	Abalos	24.8	Honasan	26	Abalos	18.8

==== Before filing of candidacies ====
#	Feb 21–29, 2024		Mar 6–10, 2024		Mar 11–14, 2024		Mar 14–19, 2024		June 15–19, 2024		June 17–24, 2024		Aug 28–Sep 2, 2024		Sep 5–23, 2024		Sep 6–13, 2024		Sep 14–23, 2024	
#	Oculum		Pulse Asia		OCTA		Publicus Asia		Publicus Asia		Pulse Asia		OCTA		WR Numero		Pulse Asia		SWS	
#	Name	%	Name	%	Name	%	Name	%	Name	%	Name	%	Name	%	Name	%	Name	%	Name	%
1	R. Duterte	53	E. Tulfo	57.1	E. Tulfo	58	Ong	41	Ong	39	E.Tulfo	58.0	E. Tulfo	60	E. Tulfo	47.2	E. Tulfo	60.8	E. Tulfo	54
2	T. Sotto	53	T. Sotto	51.8	T. Sotto	52	R. Duterte	38	E. Tulfo	33	T. Sotto	50.4	B. Tulfo	57	T. Sotto	39.3	B. Tulfo	49.6	T. Sotto	34
3	E. Tulfo	52	R. Duterte	47.7	Go	50	E. Tulfo	37	R. Duterte	32	Cayetano	42.7	T. Sotto	50	B. Tulfo	36.1	T. Sotto	48.0	Cayetano	31
4	Moreno	45	Go	44.2	B. Tulfo	43	Go	32	Lacson	32	B. Tulfo	40.9	Go	49	R Duterte	32.4	Cayetano	41.3	R. Duterte	25
5	Pacquiao	43	Cayetano	37.7	R. Duterte	38	T. Sotto	32	T. Sotto	29	R. Duterte	38.7	Lacson	44	Cayetano	30.4	Go	40.3	Marcos	25
6	dela Rosa	41	Pacquiao	37.7	Lacson	34	Lacson	32	Go	29	Go	36.6	Revilla	44	Pacquiao	30.2	R. Duterte	38.0	Lacson	24
7	Go	40	dela Rosa	33.2	dela Rosa	33	dela Rosa	28	Moreno	29	Marcos	33.8	Cayetano	35	Revilla	29.3	Binay	37.5	Revilla	24
8	Ong	35	Marcos	32.1	Pacquiao	32	Marcos	27	Robredo	28	Pacquiao	33.5	Tolentino	34	Lacson	24.4	Revilla	35.9	Villar	21
9	Marcos	35	Moreno	31.5	Revilla	30	Moreno	27	Marcos	28	Lacson	32.2	Pacquiao	34	Marcos	23.7	Lacson	35.5	Binay	20
10	V. Sotto	35	B. Tulfo	30.5	Marcos	29	Robredo	27	Pangilinan	25	Moreno	31.7	Marcos	33	dela Rosa	23.2	Pacquiao	31.9	Lapid	20
11	Cayetano	35	Revilla	29.6	Moreno	27	Teodoro	26	Teodoro	23	dela Rosa	31.3	Lapid	33	Pangilinan	23.1	Marcos	29.8	Pacquiao	18
12	Revilla	32	Binay	29.1	Cayetano	26	Cayetano	23	Cayetano	23	Revilla	29.9	R. Duterte	33	Lapid	22.3	dela Rosa	26.2	dela Rosa	18
13	Lacson	32	Lacson	28.6	Lapid	22	Pangilinan	22	dela Rosa	22	Santos-Recto	23.6	dela Rosa	29	Ong	21.9	Lapid	24.7	Go	18
14	Lapid	30	Revillame	25.9	Tolentino	22	Diokno	21	Diokno	21	Lapid	21.4	Abalos	28	Go	21.5	Honasan	21.5	Tolentino	17
15	Revillame	29	Lapid	25.4	Ong	21	Pacquiao	21	—N/a		Pangilinan	19.2	Ong	28	Tolentino	20.8	Villar	21.2	Pangilinan	15
16	Robredo	23	Ong	24.6	Abalos	21	B. Tulfo	21	—N/a		Binay	18.9	Honasan	23	Moreno	20.7	Pangilinan	20.5	Abalos	14
17	Honasan	23	Pangilinan	22.2	—N/a		Tolentino	20	—N/a		Failon	18.8	S. Duterte	22	Villar	20.1	Ong	19.8	Aquino	14
18	Roxas	22	Recto	18.8	—N/a		Gordon	18	—N/a		Honasan	18.6	Binay	22	Binay	19.1	S. Duterte	19.1	Honasan	13

=== Per coalition ===
- Coalitions and blocs with the plurality of seats in boldface.
- Coalitions with the majority of seats are shaded by the coalition color.
- Coalitions that were not projected to win one seat or more in the surveys listed here are omitted.

==== Seats won ====
- Totals may not add up to 12 due to margin of error.

Date	Pollster	Aksyon	Alyansa	D10	KiBam	NP	Ind
May 2–6, 2025	SWS	0	**8**	2	0	1	1
May 1, 2025	Publicus Asia	0	5	3	2	1	1
Apr 28 – May 3, 2025	The Center	0	**7**	3	0	1	1
Apr 28 – May 3, 2025	Arkipelago Analytics	0	**6**	3	1	0	2
Apr 23–30, 2025	WR Numero	0	**8**	2	1	0	1
Apr 20–24, 2025	Pulse Asia	0	**8**	2	0	0	2
Apr 12–14, 2025	DZRH	0	**8**	2	0	1	1
Apr 11–15, 2025	The Center	0	**8**	2	0	1	1
Apr 11–15, 2025	SWS	0	**9**	2	0	0	1
Apr 10–16, 2025	OCTA	0	**8**	2	1	0	1
Apr 7–12, 2025	Arkipelago Analytics	0	**8**	2	0	0	2
Mar 31 – Apr 7, 2025	WR Numero	0	**8**	2	1	0	1
Mar 23–29, 2025	Pulse Asia	0	**8**	2	0	0	2
Mar 22–29, 2025	The Center	0	**9**	2	0	0	1
Mar 18–24, 2025	OCTA	0	**10**	2	0	0	1
Mar 15–21, 2025	Arkipelago Analytics	0	**9**	2	0	0	2
Mar 15–20, 2025	Publicus Asia	0	**6**	4	2	0	1
Mar 15–20, 2025	SWS	0	**9**	2	0	0	2
Mar 8–10, 2025	DZRH	0	**9**	2	0	0	1
Feb 22–28, 2025	OCTA	0	**11**	2	0	0	2
Feb 20–26, 2025	Pulse Asia	0	**9**	2	0	0	2
Feb 17–22, 2025	The Center	0	**10**	2	0	0	2
Feb 15–19, 2025	SWS	0	**9**	2	0	0	2
Feb 10–18, 2025	WR Numero	0	**8**	2	2	0	2
Jan 25–31, 2025	OCTA	0	**12**	2	0	0	2
Jan 18–25, 2025	Pulse Asia	0	**9**	2	0	0	2
Jan 17–20, 2025	SWS	0	**9**	2	1	0	2
Dec 16–22, 2024	RMN–Oculum	0	**9**	2	0	0	2
Dec 12–18, 2024	SWS	0	**10**	2	1	0	2
Dec 7–9, 2024	DZRH	0	**9**	1	0	0	2
Nov 29 – Dec 3, 2024	Publicus Asia	1	**7**	2	2	0	1
Nov 26 – Dec 3, 2024	Pulse Asia	0	**10**	2	0	0	2
Nov 25 – Dec 1, 2024	The Center	1	**10**	2	0	0	1
Nov 10–16, 2024	OCTA	0	**12**	1	0	0	2
Oct 29–31, 2024	Peers Agency	1	**10**	1	1	0	1
Oct 16–17, 2024	Publicus Asia	1	**7**	2	2	0	1

== Campaign ==
Even prior to the campaign period starting, Imee Marcos and Camille Villar were identified to be the heaviest spenders in political advertisements on television, each reportedly spending 1 billion pesos each.

Campaigning for nationally elected positions, including those for senators, start on February 11, 2025, and ends on May 11, 2025, election eve.

On February 5, the final session day before Congress goes on recess for campaigning, the House of Representatives impeached Vice President Sara Duterte. The Senate then received the articles of impeachment later in the day, an hour or so before the Senate went on recess.

The following were the personnel of each slate:

Slate	Campaign manager
Alyansa para sa Bagong Pilipinas	Toby Tiangco, House representative from Navotas's at-large district
DuterTen	Robin Padilla, senator
KiBam	Risa Hontiveros, senator
Oposisyon ng Bayan	Renato Reyes, chairman of Bagong Alyansang Makabayan

=== February ===
At the start of the campaign period, the Alyansa para sa Bagong Pilipinas held a proclamation rally at the Ilocos Norte Centennial Arena in Laoag, Ilocos Norte. In this rally, President Marcos took jabs at some opposition candidates, saying "parang 'yung mga iba na naging kandidato eh nag-deliver lang yata ng suka eh nabigyan na ng certificate of candidacy" (transl. some looked like they just delivered vinegar but yet was given a certificate of candidacy), with "suka" referring to vinegar), as opposed to their slate's candidates' track record for public service.

Bam Aquino and Francis Pangilinan held their proclamation rally at Dasmariñas Arena in Dasmariñas, Cavite, together with Akbayan and Mamamayang Liberal partylists. On February 11, Aquino maintained that their KiBam slate is an "independent slate" and not an "opposition" one, Makabayan held their proclamation rally at the Liwasang Bonifacio in Manila. Quiboloy also held a proclamation rally at the Ynares Sports Arena in Pasig, attended by some PDP candidates.

The West Philippine Sea

On February 13, PDP also held their proclamation rally at the Club Filipino in San Juan. On that proclamation rally, Duterte joked "Let's just kill incumbent senators so there will be vacancies. If we can kill 15 senators, we can all get in." On the same proclamation rally, Ronald dela Rosa, in response to President Marcos's "suka comments", said that their slate should be called "Team Suka", and that vinegar vendors should not stop oneself from dreaming big. Also in response to allegations that he is a "pro-China" candidate, dela Rosa said "I am eager to wage war there in the West Philippine Sea" This is also after fellow PDP slate member Rodante Marcoleta said that "There is not—there is nothing as" the West Philippine Sea. Marcoleta reversed his statements on February 13, saying "I am not saying it is wrong for us to call [it the] West Philippine Sea, because I said, with or without name, that particular area is ours".

On their proclamation rally at the Bantayog ng mga Bayani in Quezon City, the Partido Lakas ng Masa, in reference to President Marcos's "suka comments", decried the latter's candidates on not showing up for debates. Leody de Guzman labeled the administration's candidates as cowards, while Luke Espiritu called Marcos's statement as arrogant. The Workers' and Peasants' Party started their campaign at Manila.

Ariel Querubin, a retired marine colonel, and 1-Rider House representative Bonifacio Bosita, a retired police lieutenant colonel, announced their alliance on February 17, calling themselves the "Riding-in-tandem Team".

=== March ===
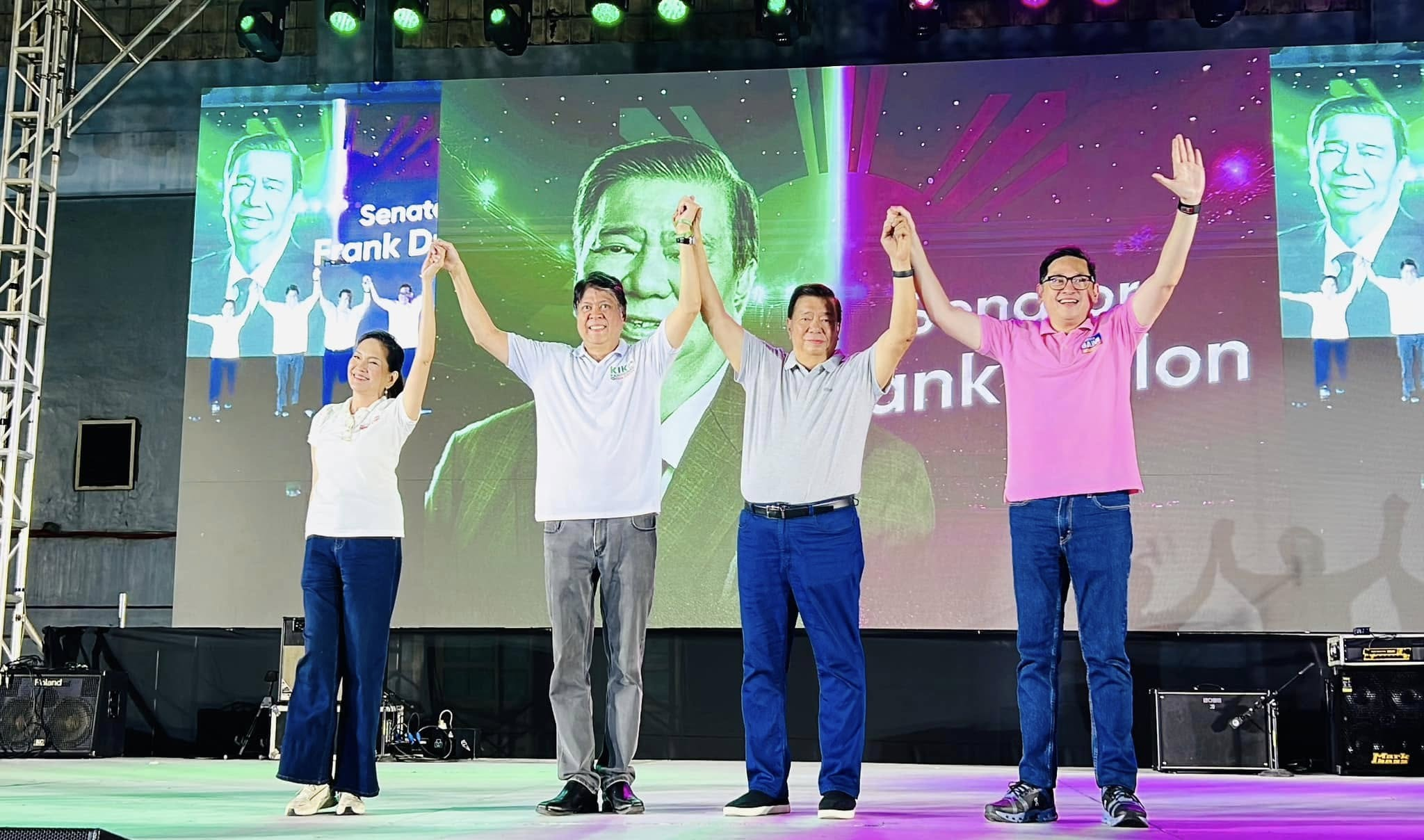
Hontiveros (far left) and Franklin Drilon (second from right) endorse Pangilinan and Aquino in Iloilo City, March 6, 2025

On March 11, former president Rodrigo Duterte was arrested on basis of a warrant from the International Criminal Court (ICC) coursed via Interpol. Duterte was arrested at the Ninoy Aquino International Airport, after returning to the country after an election rally at Hong Kong. Senate President Francis Escudero urged due process from the ICC and called for restraint, warning against using Duterte's arrest for political gain ahead of the election. Reelectionist Imee Marcos, criticized the political divisions, saying Duterte's arrest only creates "chaos" and questioning whether it benefits ordinary Filipinos. She also expressed sympathy, noting his age. Marcos skipped a campaign rally in Tacloban in protest of Duterte's arrest. She then asked the Senate to conduct an investigation on the manner how Duterte was arrested.

Makabayan candidate Arlene Brosas called it "a glimpse of hope" for the victims' families, while fellow Makabayan candidate France Castro described it as "a concrete step towards accountability and justice" for victims of human rights abuses. PLM candidate Luke Espiritu expressed strong support for Duterte's arrest, accusing the former president of severely damaging the nation's values and character, and calling the arrest "just". A rally protesting Duterte's arrest and asked for his return to the Philippines was held at the Liwasang Bonifacio, attended by PDP candidates.

Meanwhile, dela Rosa asked for the Senate to provide him protection in case the ICC issues a warrant for him. Escudero said "the Senate will not allow any of its members to be arrested within the Senate, especially during a session." Dela Rosa initially said that once the Senate's protection on him ends, he would have surrendered peacefully, saying he will not engage in a gunfight with the arresting team. However, a day later, he said that he is mulling on hiding from the authorities instead of surrendering.

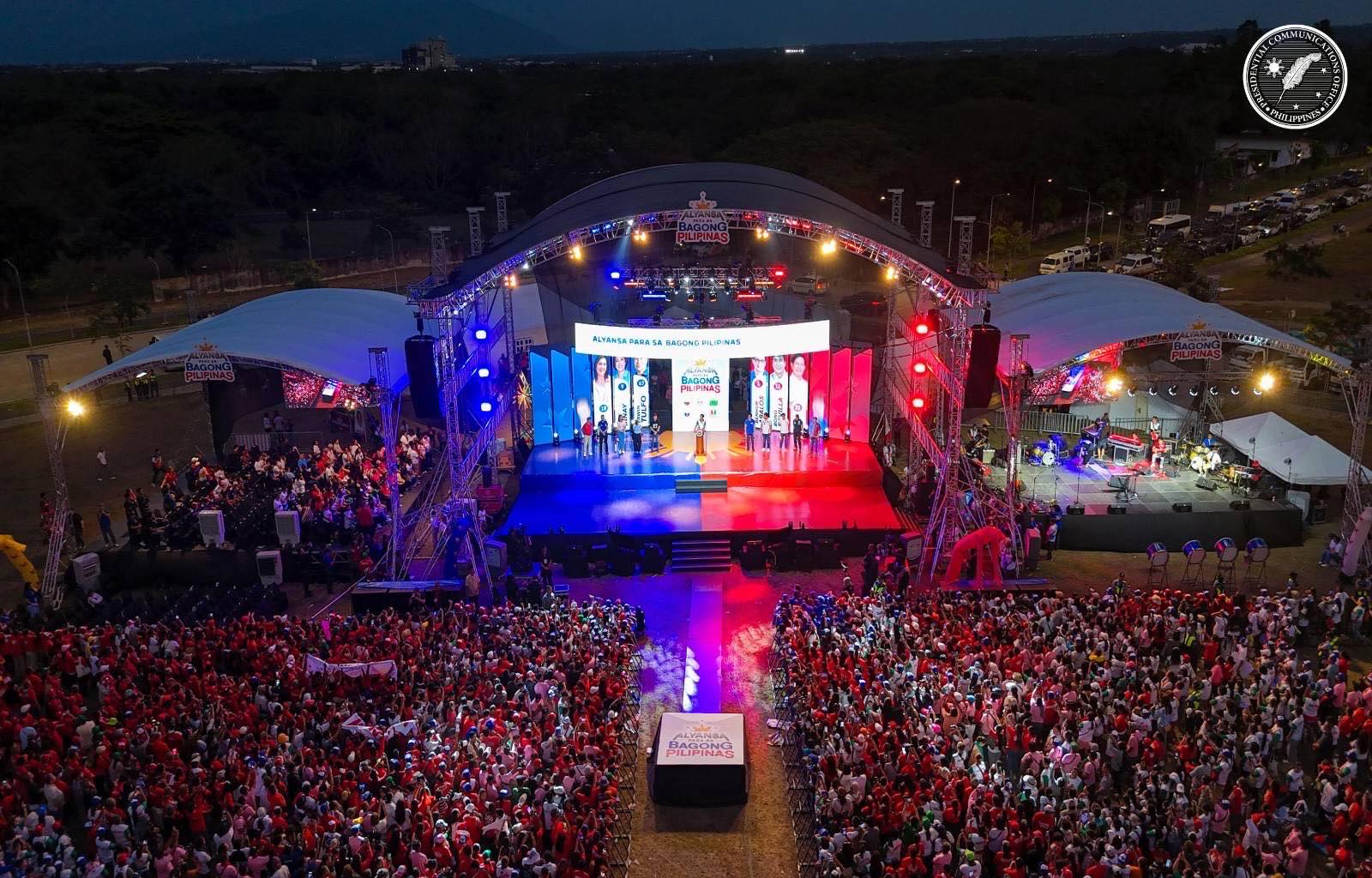
Alyansa para sa Bagong Pilipinas rally held on March 22, 2025, at Nuvali East Bloc, Santa Rosa, Laguna

On the Senate hearing regarding former president Duterte's arrest, Senator Marcos, who was the chair of Senate Foreign Relations Committee, said that Duterte's rights were violated as he was not given the chance to subject the ICC warrant via judicial review, and that Duterte was not given a physical copy of the warrant of arrest. Anthony Alcantara, executive director of the Philippine Center on Transnational Crime, said that they did not receive a red notice from Interpol, but instead a red diffusion, or a "wanted person notice". Jesus Crispin Remulla, the Secretary of Justice, invoked the commitment of the Philippines to Interpol and following Republic Act No. 9851, the law punishing crimes against humanity. Remulla refuted Marcos's pronouncements that ICC lacked jurisdiction as the Philippine justice system was working, pointing out that relatives of victims of extrajudicial killings found it impossible to file cases on local courts due to lack of police reports, and due to inaction from fiscals. On subsequent Alyansa rallies, President Marcos omitted his sister's name in his speeches.

Vice President Duterte then later endorsed ten candidates: the nine candidates on the PDP slate, and Richard Mata, but not Senator Marcos. The PDP slate then adopted the name DuterTen, a portmanteau of "Duterte" and "ten", the number of candidates on their senatorial ticket). Imee Marcos then left Alyansa on March 26, 2025. On the findings released by the committee led by Marcos, it found that the Philippines had "no obligation to arrest Duterte and turn him over to the ICC, that the Philippine government decided to arrest Duterte, and that Duterte's rights were violated. Marcos then later said that "I'm not paying attention to it" on rumors that the DuterTen ticket was planning to adopt her

=== April ===
On his first appearance since the arrest of Rodrigo Duterte, Ronald dela Rosa attended the second hearing of the foreign relations committee. Government officials skipped the meeting, citing executive privilege. In the hearing, Dela Rosa montioned to issue subpoenas to missing cabinet members; Senate President Francis Escudero did not issue subpoenas to the hearing. On the third hearing attended by government officials, Markus Lacanilao, Special Envoy on Transnational Crimes, was cited in contempt of Congress by the committee. Escudero refused to sign the contempt order, releasing Lacanilao from the Senate's custody. Dela Rosa motioned Lacanilao to be cited in contempt, after dela Rosa accused him of lying during the hearing. Escudero issued a statement saying that Marcos "to refrain from using the Senate as a platform for her own personal political objectives". Jesus Crispin Remulla, the justice secretary, said that they did not attend the second hearing as they anticipated that the senators would bully them and pressure them on making admissions.

On April 13, Senator Robin Padilla, also president of PDP–Laban, endorsed Marcos. A day later, Sara Duterte releases a political advertisement endorsing Imee Marcos, with both women clad in black clothing. The government decried the advertisement, calling it as "fake news", calling the Duterte administration being "black" as the one having best describing the advertisement. A week later, Duterte appeared on another political advertisement endorsing Camille Villar. Later that week, the COMELEC summoned Villar for alleged vote buying in Cavite. Villar denied that the incident was illegal, having occurred on February 9, two days before the campaign period. Despite this, Toby Tiangco, Alyansa's campaign manager, maintained that Villar was still a part of the slate. Villar then skipped a campaign sortie with her fellow Alyansa candidates in Dagupan, saying that she was sick.

A week after Duterte's endorsement of Villar, Bulacan vice governor Alex Castro appealed to the Senate to investigate PrimeWater's alleged appalling service. PrimeWater is a water management service owned by the Villars. Castro cited issues in San Jose del Monte, where the local government sued the company to terminate their 25-year joint venture agreement that was signed in 2018. Bulacan governor Daniel Fernando, citing instances where communities have no running water for days on weekends, and exorbitant water bills, described it as "very poor" service. On April 30, presidential spokesperson Claire Castro (no relation to the vice governor) said the president will order an investigation on PrimeWater.

=== May ===
Despite this, while Alyansa backed the government on investigating PrimeWater, they maintained that Villar is still a part of their slate. The government and several Alyansa candidates denied Sara Duterte's allegations that the investigations on PrimeWater were politically motivated, with it having 73 joint ventures with local water districts around the country. The Local Water Utilities Administration began its investigation on PrimeWater on May 2. Meanwhile, on a rally at Batangas City, President Marcos did not endorse Villar.

On a rally at Quezon City, Honeylet Avanceña, Rodigo Duterte's domestic partner, and their daughter Kitty Duterte, campaigned for a block vote the DuterTen slate. Kitty's statement of "I am here now because they took from us, from all of us, most of all from me, my father... Instead of addressing crime, corruption, and poverty, this administration is prioritizing ruining my family and all of its allies," was roasted in social media.

At a later rally in Malolos, despite Villar's absence, President Marcos endorsed the latter, after not being mentioned in prior rallies in Batangas City and Dumajug. The COMELEC dismissed the vote-buying case against Villar, confirming the incident, which involved giving cash prizes to rallygoers, indeed occurred prior to the campaigning period, despite it being posted on social media after the campaign period began.

On May 8, the Partido Demokratko Pilipino held their miting de avance at the Liwasang Bonifacio in Manila. PDP candidates exhorted the people to support the Dutertes. In the rally, Sara Duterte said that she is "not the problem of the Philippines. A Duterte is not the problem of the Philippines." The Alyansa ended their campaign at their miting de avance in Nueve de Pebrero Street in Mandaluyong on May 9; Villar was still absent. Villar instead attended the miting de avance of the local Nacionalista Party in her hometown of Las Piñas. Makabayan held their miting de avance in Tomas Morato Avenue, Quezon City on the same day. The miting de avance of Hugpong sa Tawong Lungsod of the Dutertes in Davao City was attended by most of the DuterTen candidates.

Also on the same day, the Iglesia ni Cristo released its list of endorsements for eight senatorial candidates. Meanwhile, the Catholic Bishops' Conference of the Philippines labeled that neither they nor Cardinal Pablo Virgilio David endorsed any candidates in any position, denouncing circulating social media posts as "fake news". David also said that Filipinos "can treat the election of a leader as a sacred moment", comparing the election to then just-concluded papal conclave.

On May 10, the KiBam ticket attended the local Liberal Party miting de avance in Naga, hosted by mayoral candidate and defeated 2022 presidential candidate Leni Robredo. Just before the end of the campaign period, Marcos and Villar were officially added as guest candidates of DuterTen.

== Results ==
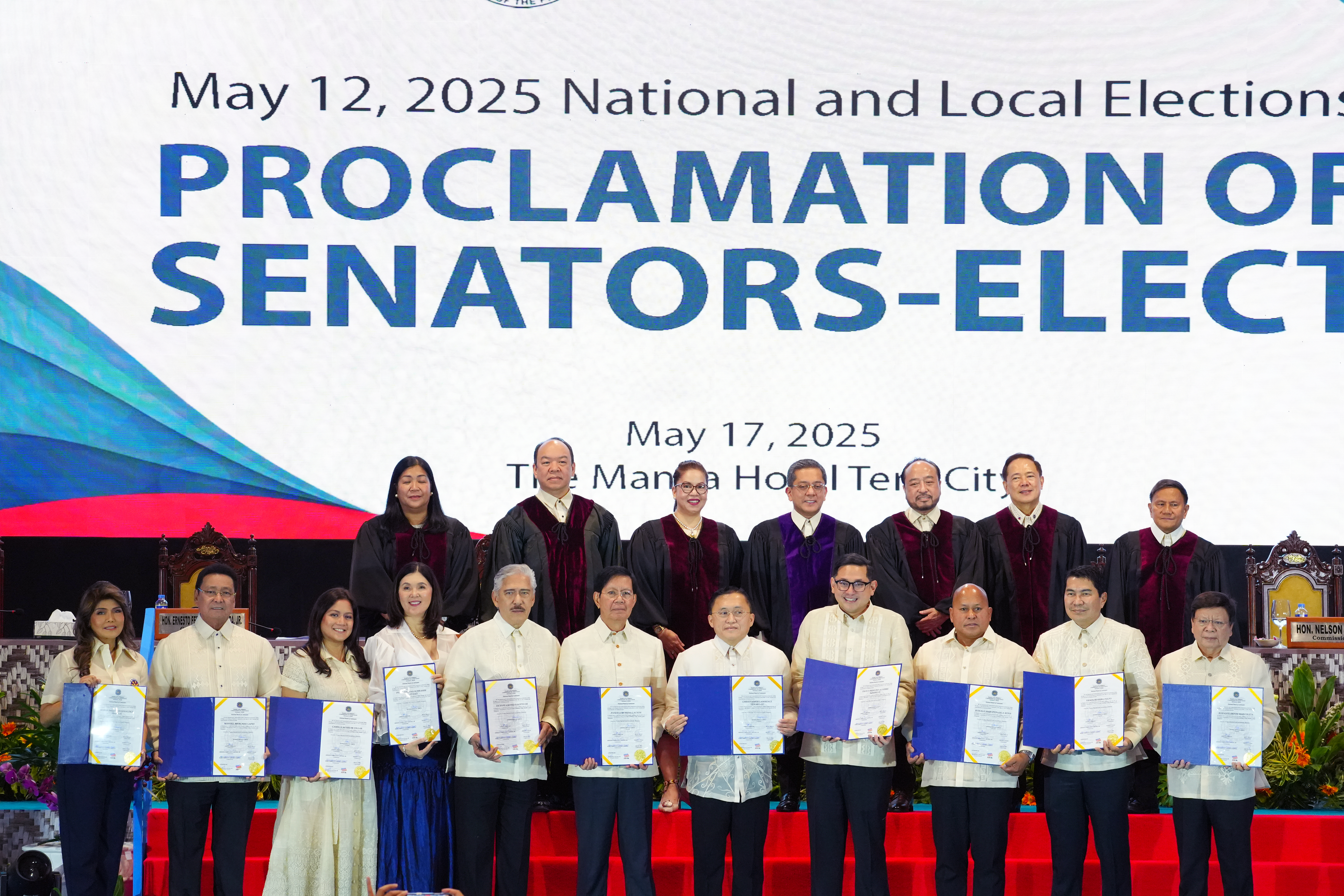
Proclamation of the winning senators of the 2025 Senate elections (Pangilinan was absent)

The Commission on Elections (COMELEC), sitting as the National Board of Canvassers (NBOC) expected to proclaim the winners at least a week after election. The NBOC first convened on May 13, a day after the election, to canvass the local absentee voting results. Rodante Marcoleta called on to the COMELEC to make a partial proclamation of at least then top six candidates, which the commission refused, maintaining that it will proclaim all twelve winners together by Saturday after the election at the earliest. The commission canvassed 159 certificates of canvass by Wednesday after the election, on what was said to be record speed, leaving just 16 certificates. On May 15, the NBOC finished canvassing the votes. The winning senators were proclaimed on May 17, with all candidates except for Francis Pangilinan attending.

The Alyansa para sa Bagong Pilipinas secured six seats. None of their candidates cracked the top three, with Erwin Tulfo finishing at fourth place. The sixth Alyansa candidate, Camille Villar, was also added as a guest candidate by the DuterTen. For the DuterTen ticket, Bong Go, Marcoleta and Ronald dela Rosa won, with Go topping the nationwide vote. Marcoleta relied on the Duterte stronghold of Mindanao, being in the top six in at least three provinces there. Both candidates in the KiBam ticket won, with Bam Aquino ranking second and Pangilinan fifth. Aquino emerged as the topnotcher in at least 23 provinces, mostly in Luzon, while Pangilinan was in the top six in at least 23 provinces. Imee Marcos, also a guest candidate of the DuterTen, clinched the last spot in the top 12, based primarily on voters from the Solid North or from the Ilocano heartland.

Five senators, Go, dela Rosa, Cayetano, Lapid, and Marcos, successfully defended their seats. Meanwhile, four are returning to the Senate (Aquino, Pangilinan, Lacson, and Sotto), while three are neophytes that were serving out the remainder of their terms as House representatives (Tulfo, Marcoleta, and Villar). Sotto was elected for a fifth senatorial term, the first Filipino senator to have done so. Incumbent senators Bong Revilla and Francis Tolentino failed to defend their seats, placing 14th and 25th, respectively.

=== Per candidate ===
A map showing the results by illustrating the topnotcher candidate by province.

Candidate	Party or alliance		Votes	%
Bong Go	DuterTen	PDP–Laban	27,121,073	47.29
Bam Aquino	KiBam	Katipunan ng Nagkakaisang Pilipino	20,971,899	36.57
Ronald dela Rosa	DuterTen	PDP–Laban	20,773,946	36.22
Erwin Tulfo	Alyansa para sa Bagong Pilipinas	Lakas–CMD	17,118,881	29.85
Kiko Pangilinan	KiBam	Liberal Party	15,343,229	26.75
Rodante Marcoleta	DuterTen	Independent	15,250,723	26.59
Panfilo Lacson	Alyansa para sa Bagong Pilipinas	Independent	15,106,111	26.34
Tito Sotto	Alyansa para sa Bagong Pilipinas	Nationalist People's Coalition	14,832,996	25.86
Pia Cayetano	Alyansa para sa Bagong Pilipinas	Nacionalista Party	14,573,430	25.41
Camille Villar	Alyansa para sa Bagong Pilipinas (Note: Guest candidate of DuterTen)	Nacionalista Party	13,651,274	23.80
Lito Lapid	Alyansa para sa Bagong Pilipinas	Nationalist People's Coalition	13,394,102	23.35
Imee Marcos	Nacionalista Party		13,339,227	23.26
Ben Tulfo	Independent		12,090,090	21.08
Bong Revilla	Alyansa para sa Bagong Pilipinas	Lakas–CMD	12,027,845	20.97
Abigail Binay	Alyansa para sa Bagong Pilipinas	Nationalist People's Coalition	11,808,645	20.59
Benhur Abalos	Alyansa para sa Bagong Pilipinas	Partido Federal ng Pilipinas	11,580,520	20.19
Jimmy Bondoc	DuterTen	PDP–Laban	10,615,598	18.51
Manny Pacquiao	Alyansa para sa Bagong Pilipinas	Partido Federal ng Pilipinas	10,397,133	18.13
Phillip Salvador	DuterTen	PDP–Laban	10,241,491	17.86
Bonifacio Bosita	Riding-in-Tandem Team	Independent	9,805,903	17.10
Heidi Mendoza	Independent		8,759,732	15.27
Willie Revillame	Independent		8,568,924	14.94
Vic Rodriguez	DuterTen	Independent	8,450,668	14.74
Raul Lambino	DuterTen	PDP–Laban	8,383,593	14.62
Francis Tolentino	Alyansa para sa Bagong Pilipinas	Partido Federal ng Pilipinas	7,702,550	13.43
Jayvee Hinlo	DuterTen	PDP–Laban	7,471,704	13.03
Willie Ong (Note: Withdrew but remained on the ballot)	Aksyon Demokratiko		7,371,944	12.85
Gregorio Honasan	Reform PH Party		6,700,772	11.68
Luke Espiritu	Partido Lakas ng Masa		6,481,413	11.30
Richard Mata	DuterTen	Independent	5,789,181	10.09
Apollo Quiboloy	DuterTen	Independent	5,719,041	9.97
Teodoro Casiño	Makabayan		4,648,271	8.10
Arlene Brosas	Makabayan		4,343,773	7.57
Leody de Guzman	Partido Lakas ng Masa		4,136,899	7.21
Danilo Ramos	Makabayan		4,091,257	7.13
Ariel Querubin	Riding-in-Tandem Team	Nacionalista Party	3,950,051	6.89
Liza Maza	Makabayan		3,927,784	6.85
Sonny Matula	Workers' and Peasants' Party		3,865,792	6.74
Ronnel Arambulo	Makabayan		3,846,216	6.71
France Castro	Makabayan		3,670,972	6.40
Angelo de Alban	Independent		2,556,983	4.46
Roberto Ballon	Independent		2,389,847	4.17
Norman Marquez	Independent		1,150,095	2.01
Eric Martinez	Independent		1,032,201	1.80
Norberto Gonzales	Partido Demokratiko Sosyalista ng Pilipinas		990,091	1.73
Jocelyn Andamo	Makabayan		829,084	1.45
Allen Capuyan	Partido Pilipino sa Pagbabago		818,437	1.43
Ernesto Arellano	Katipunan ng Kamalayang Kayumanggi		801,677	1.40
Jerome Adonis	Makabayan		779,868	1.36
Mimi Doringo	Makabayan		744,506	1.30
Arnel Escobal	Partido Maharlika		731,453	1.28
Jose Montemayor Jr.	Independent		671,818	1.17
Wilson Amad	Independent		618,943	1.08
Mar Valbuena	Independent		611,432	1.07
David D'Angelo	Bunyog Party		607,642	1.06
Wilbert T. Lee	Aksyon Demokratiko		587,098	1.02
Marc Gamboa	Aksyon Demokratiko	Independent	571,637	1.00
Amirah Lidasan	Makabayan		564,948	0.99
Mody Floranda	Makabayan		554,385	0.97
Nur-Ana Sahidulla	Independent		476,855	0.83
Michael Tapado	Partido Maharlika		460,662	0.80
Relly Jose Jr.	Kilusang Bagong Lipunan		458,383	0.80
Jose Olivar	Independent		448,794	0.78
Subair Mustapha	Workers' and Peasants' Party		414,027	0.72
Roy Cabonegro	Democratic Party of the Philippines		383,534	0.67
Leandro Verceles Jr.	Independent		310,562	0.54
Total			428,489,615	100.00
Total votes			57,350,958	–
Registered voters/turnout			69,673,655	82.31
Source: COMELEC

=== Per coalition ===
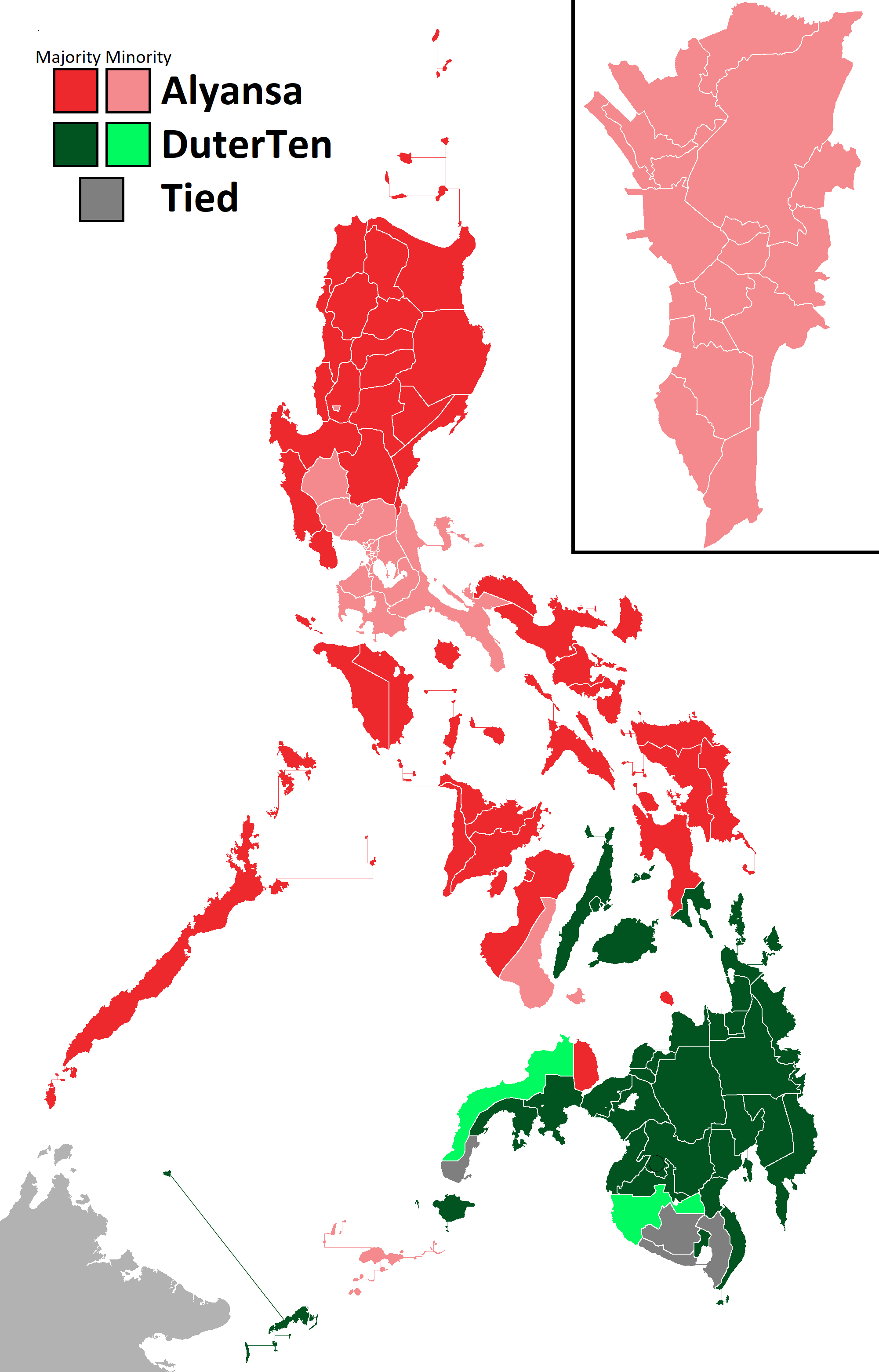
Results per province and city, with the number of candidates per ticket in the top 12 in that place. Metro Manila is on the inset at the upper right corner.

An expanded map of the election showing the rankings of each electoral alliance candidate or other participating candidates in each province. Note that KiBam never won a majority of seats nor votes in any jurisdiction in the Philippines.

Party or alliance		Votes	%	Seats
Alyansa para sa Bagong Pilipinas	Nationalist People's Coalition	40,035,743	9.34	2
Alyansa para sa Bagong Pilipinas	Partido Federal ng Pilipinas	29,680,203	6.93	0
Alyansa para sa Bagong Pilipinas	Lakas–CMD	29,146,726	6.80	1
Alyansa para sa Bagong Pilipinas	Nacionalista Party	28,224,704	6.59	2
Alyansa para sa Bagong Pilipinas	Independent	15,106,111	3.53	1
Alyansa para sa Bagong Pilipinas	Total	142,193,487	33.18	6
DuterTen	PDP–Laban	84,607,405	19.75	2
DuterTen	Independent	35,209,613	8.22	1
DuterTen	Total	119,817,018	27.96	3
KiBam	Katipunan ng Nagkakaisang Pilipino	20,971,899	4.89	1
KiBam	Liberal Party	15,343,229	3.58	1
KiBam	Total	36,315,128	8.48	2
Makabayan		28,001,064	6.53	0
Riding-in-tandem Team	Nacionalista Party	3,950,051	0.92	0
Riding-in-tandem Team	Independent	9,805,903	2.29	0
Riding-in-tandem Team	Total	13,755,954	3.21	0
Nacionalista Party		13,339,227	3.11	1
Partido Lakas ng Masa		10,618,312	2.48	0
Aksyon Demokratiko	Aksyon Demokratiko (Note: Both Aksyon Demokratiko candidates withdrew, making any votes for them stray.)	7,959,042	1.86	0
Aksyon Demokratiko	Independent	571,637	0.13	0
Aksyon Demokratiko	Total	8,530,679	1.99	0
Reform PH Party		6,700,772	1.56	0
Workers' and Peasants' Party		4,279,819	1.00	0
Partido Maharlika		1,192,115	0.28	0
Partido Demokratiko Sosyalista ng Pilipinas		990,091	0.23	0
Partido Pilipino sa Pagbabago		818,437	0.19	0
Katipunan ng Kamalayang Kayumanggi		801,677	0.19	0
Bunyog Party		607,642	0.14	0
Kilusang Bagong Lipunan		458,383	0.11	0
Democratic Party of the Philippines		383,534	0.09	0
Independent		39,686,276	9.26	0
Total		428,489,615	100.00	12
Total votes		57,350,958	–	
Registered voters/turnout		69,673,653	82.31	
Source: COMELEC

Proclamation of senators-elect last 17 May 2025.

Vote share
Alyansa	33.18%
DuterTen	27.96%
KiBam	8.48%
Makabayan	6.53%
RITT	3.21%
NP	3.11%
Others	17.53%

Senate seats won
Alyansa	50.00%
DuterTen	25.00%
KiBam	16.67%
Makabayan	0%
RITT	0%
NP	8.33%
Others	0%

==== Provincial results per coalition ====
The following maps show how many candidates per ticket made it to the top 12 on that place. Metro Manila is shown at the inset on the upper right corner.

Alyansa para sa Bagong Pilipinas	DuterTen	KiBam

=== Per party ===
Party	Votes	%	+/–	Seats				
Party	Votes	%	+/–	Up	Before	Won	After	+/−
PDP–Laban	84,607,405	19.75	+9.88	2	3	2	3	0
Nacionalista Party	45,513,982	10.62	+6.11	4	5	3	4	−1
Nationalist People's Coalition	40,035,743	9.34	−13.26	1	5	2	6	+1
Partido Federal ng Pilipinas	29,680,203	6.93	New	1	1	0	0	−1
Lakas–CMD	29,146,726	6.80	New	1	1	1	1	0
Makabayan	28,001,064	6.53	+4.75	0	0	0	0	0
Katipunan ng Nagkakaisang Pilipino	20,971,899	4.89	+2.58	0	0	1	1	+1
Liberal Party	15,343,229	3.58	−1.09	0	0	1	1	+1
Partido Lakas ng Masa	10,618,312	2.48	+1.31	0	0	0	0	0
Aksyon Demokratiko (Note: Both Aksyon Demokratiko candidates withdrew, making any votes for them stray.)	7,959,042	1.86	+0.06	0	0	0	0	0
Reform PH Party	6,700,772	1.56	New	0	0	0	0	0
Workers' and Peasants' Party	4,279,819	1.00	+0.60	0	0	0	0	0
Partido Maharlika	1,192,115	0.28	+0.07	0	0	0	0	0
Partido Demokratiko Sosyalista ng Pilipinas	990,091	0.23	New	0	0	0	0	0
Partido Pilipino sa Pagbabago	818,437	0.19	+0.06	0	0	0	0	0
Katipunan ng Kamalayang Kayumanggi	801,677	0.19	−0.09	0	0	0	0	0
Bunyog Party	607,642	0.14	New	0	0	0	0	0
Kilusang Bagong Lipunan	458,383	0.11	New	0	0	0	0	0
Democratic Party of the Philippines	383,534	0.09	−0.00	0	0	0	0	0
Independent	100,379,540	23.43	−0.56	1	5	2	6	+1
Akbayan				0	1	0	1	0
Pwersa ng Masang Pilipino				0	1	0	1	0
United Nationalist Alliance				1	1	0	0	−1
Vacancy				1	1	0	0	−1
Total	428,489,615	100.00	–	12	24	12	24	0
Total votes	57,350,958	–						
Registered voters/turnout	69,673,655	82.31						
Source: COMELEC

Vote share
PDP–Laban	19.75%
Nacionalista	10.62%
NPC	9.34%
PFP	6.93%
Lakas	6.80%
Makabayan	6.53%
KANP	4.89%
Liberal	3.58%
Independent	23.43%
Others	8.13%

Senate seats won
PDP–Laban	16.67%
Nacionalista	25.00%
NPC	16.67%
PFP	0%
Lakas	8.33%
Makabayan	0%
KANP	8.33%
Liberal	8.33%
Independent	16.67%
Others	0%

== Defeated incumbents ==
1. Bong Revilla (Alyansa/Lakas)
2. Francis Tolentino (Alyansa/PFP)
  - Tolentino was appointed Secretary of Labor and Employment in 2026.

== Aftermath ==
=== Reactions ===
On the day after the election, President Bongbong Marcos invited election winners, "I extend my hand. Let us move forward together." Later, on Alyansa's thanksgiving party, Marcos further stated "We all wish we had better results, but you know, we live to fight another day. But now it's time, I think, to put all the politics aside, it's time to put all of the issues that were raised during the election, and only talk about not political issues but developmental issues". Toby Tiangco, Alyansa's campaign manager, said "we consider the victory of most of our candidates a vote of confidence in the Bagong Pilipinas".

Vice President Sara Duterte expressed disappointment at the results, stating that “the outcome was not what we had hoped for.” Duterte encouraged the public to support their efforts in “building a powerful and principled opposition.” The result of the election is also expected to have an effect on her ongoing impeachment. Meanwhile, Senator and opposition leader Risa Hontiveros, who also served as KiBam's campaign manager, declared a strengthened opposition bloc in Congress with the electoral victory of the KiBam tandem and the concurrent success of allied party-list groups in the lower house. The win also marked a comeback for the Aquino family.

Panfilo Lacson, after the initial results were known, blamed the failure of the administration's political machinery on why the Alyansa did not win more seats. Lacson remarked that the biggest beneficiaries of 'DuterTen' and 'Alyansa Minus Two' were Bam Aquino and Kiko Pangilinan". Ronald Llamas, a political analyst, said that the election was a vote against the administration, instead of a vote in favor of the Dutertes. Former House representative Barry Gutierrez blamed Tiangco for Alyansa's underperformance, saying that "[Toby] Tiangco failed to deliver. And now, he's pointing fingers".

==== On the accuracy of the results ====
Detained candidate Apollo Quiboloy, who at the time ranked 31st, called for a manual recount of votes due to "numerous reports of overvoting anomalies, inconsistencies in ballot readings, and other electoral irregularities". Seven of the DuterTen candidates (those who were losing) repeated Quiboloy's calls for a manual recount, saying they'd file a motion for a manual recount of votes, but would not push for the suspension of the proclamation of winners. COMELEC spokesperson Rex Laudiangco later remarked that the only way for a manual recount to be done is for Quiboloy to file an election protest. The COMELEC later stated that the law does not have provisions on manual recounting of votes save for random manual audits, although Garcia said that the law may need to be revisited. As they had also proclaimed the winners, he said the COMELEC no longer has jurisdiction, but to the Senate Electoral Tribunal.

On June 12, Independence Day, Sara Duterte said that three DuterTen candidates were cheated. In a gathering at Kuala Lumpur, Duterte said that Jayvee Hinlo, Richard Mata and Jimmy Bondoc were cheated in the election. Duterte, upon talking to IT experts, who said that "it was impossible that the numbers that came out are true". Later that month, PDP petitioned the Supreme Court to manually recount the votes of the senatorial election. The commission welcomed the petition.

==== On the accuracy of pre-election polls ====
Election winners Aquino, Marcoleta, and Pangilinan did not figure well in the last surveys prior to the election. In contrast, Ben Tulfo, Bong Revilla, and Abigail Binay, who were often included in the top 12 candidates in the surveys, were not able to win. Alyansa underperformed, winning six seats, fewer than polls predicted, with none of the election's top three candidates coming from the alliance. Predicted topnotcher Erwin Tulfo finished fourth, Tito Sotto slipped from third to eighth, Lito Lapid fell from fourth to eleventh, and Abigail Binay and Bong Revilla, who were in the top 12, finished outside the winning places. The DuterTen ticket secured three seats, alongside two guest candidates. The remaining two seats went to the KiBam ticket, who defied pre-election polls and won. COMELEC chairman George Garcia said that surveys may have missed several key factors on why they missed the result. Garcia pointed out that the sampling may not have optimal, and poll respondents may not have been truthful in answering or had changed their minds at the last minute.

Ronald Holmes, president of the Pulse Asia polling company, said that this "was the first time where we basically had movements in ranks that were quite significant", and that their last survey was conducted "three weeks before the elections—and a lot [had] happened [since] then." The company also noted that the machineries of the Marcos and Duterte may have struggled to mobilize voter support, as support for the Marcos-backed Alyansa dropped in several regions in Luzon while the DuterTen underperformed in Mindanao. It added that several candidates, mostly independent or progressive, received higher actual votes compared to final pre-election surveys.

The millennials and generation Z comprise 60% of registered voters. Cleve Arguelles of WR Numero Research said that the youth repudiated both Marcos and Duterte slates, and voted for KiBam. Ana de Villa-Singson of the Parish Pastoral Council for Responsible Voting pointed out that surveys done in schools are substantially different from surveys done by pollsters, with the KiBam candidates being included in the top 12. Eric Alvia of the National Citizens' Movement for Free Elections said that the voters' rejection of the Alyansa "may be a referendum on the administration's performance and satisfaction. Another factor is that it is a clear message of a strong support especially in the D/E class and Mindanao vote from Duterte et al supporters."

=== Election to the Senate presidency ===
At the convening of the 20th Congress, Escudero defeated Sotto, with 19 votes against 5, and with both of them voting for each other. Sotto then became minority leader. Estrada was elected Senate president pro tempore, and Joel Villanueva was named majority leader and the chairman of the Committee on Rules.

==== Results ====
Candidate	Party	Votes	%
Francis Escudero	Nationalist People's Coalition	19	79.17
Tito Sotto	Nationalist People's Coalition	5	20.83
Total		24	100.00

===== Per senator =====
Senator	Party	Voted for
Alan Peter Cayetano	Independent	Escudero
JV Ejercito	NPC	Escudero
Francis Escudero	NPC	Sotto
Jinggoy Estrada	PMP	Escudero
Win Gatchalian	NPC	Escudero
Risa Hontiveros	Akbayan	Sotto
Loren Legarda	NPC	Sotto
Robin Padilla	PDP–Laban	Escudero
Raffy Tulfo	Independent	Escudero
Joel Villanueva	Independent	Escudero
Mark Villar	Nacionalista	Escudero
Migz Zubiri	Independent	Sotto
Bam Aquino	KANP	Escudero
Pia Cayetano	Nacionalista	Escudero
Ronald dela Rosa	PDP–Laban	Escudero
Bong Go	PDP–Laban	Escudero
Panfilo Lacson	Independent	Sotto
Lito Lapid	NPC	Escudero
Rodante Marcoleta	Independent	Escudero
Imee Marcos	Nacionalista	Escudero
Kiko Pangilinan	Liberal	Escudero
Tito Sotto	NPC	Escudero
Erwin Tulfo	Lakas	Escudero
Camille Villar	Nacionalista	Escudero

== Campaign finance ==
All official candidates must file their Statement of Contribution and Expenditures (SOCE) despite

- were elected or not,
- neither had received contributions or spent expenditures,
- self-funded their campaign; and
- withdrew their candidacy, unless they withdrew their candidacy before the official start of campaigning (February 11)

The SOCE must be filed within 30 days from the date of the election, or until June 11, 2025. No elected candidate shall assume if they had no submitted their SOCE before the deadline is over.

=== Candidates with submissions ===
This is sorted by order of submission:

Candidate	Party	Donations and contributions in pesos	Spent and expenditures in pesos	Result
Vic Rodriguez	Independent	2,340,000.00	2,779,814.39	Lost
Norberto Gonzales	PDSP	0.00	289,959.68	Lost
Willie Ong	Aksyon	0.00	49,329.00	Withdrew
France Castro	Makabayan	1,000,000.00	1,058,145.50	Lost
Tito Sotto	NPC	35,500,000.00	96,638,901.01	Won
Angelo De Alban	Independent	3,100.00	1,980,517.12	Lost
Jerome Adonis	Makabayan	725,000.00	724,145.21	Lost
Phillip Salvador	PDP–Laban	2,600,000.00	2,657,155.45	Lost
Jayvee Hinlo	PDP–Laban	0.00	693,332.46	Lost
Raul Lambino	PDP–Laban	0.00	2,542,000.00 (est.) (Note: Lambino's SOCE is too unclear to be visible, this number is shown as the rest is too difficult to make out of.)	Lost
Bam Aquino	KANP	86,962,657.00	86,150,395.49	Won
Arlene Brosas	Makabayan	1,320,000.00	1,310,574.69	Lost
Leandro Verceles Jr.	Independent	0.00	36,000.00	Lost
Jose Montemayor Jr.	Independent	0.00	0.00	Lost
Imee Marcos	Nacionalista	138,500,000.00	139,198,208.47	Won
Subair Mustapha	WPP	0.00	3,053,950.00	Lost
Sonny Matula	WPP	355,000.00	329,388.92	Lost
Kiko Pangilinan	Liberal	119,400,972.41	119,400,972.41	Won
Panfilo Lacson	Independent	118,510,777.00	18,955,871.44	Won
Norman Marquez	Independent	137,571.00	137,571.00	Lost
Rodante Marcoleta	Independent	0.00	112,857,951.44	Won
Ariel Querubin	Nacionalista	0.00	6,464,191.38	Lost
Richard Mata	Independent	695,120.39	629,266.82	Lost
Jocelyn Andamo	Makabayan	1,000,000.00	955,190.43	Lost
Amirah Lidasan	Makabayan	923,000.00	922,977.19	Lost
David D'Angelo	Bunyog	24,778.20	60,101.37	Lost
Apollo Quiboloy	Independent	10,525,215.11	13,830,215.11	Lost
Pia Cayetano	Nacionalista	169,623,644.00	162,014,961.05	Won
Liza Maza	Makabayan	1,430,000.00	1,504,142.48	Lost
Mimi Doringo	Makabayan	517,000.00	517,070.13	Lost
Arnel Escobal	PM	0.00	947,511.00	Lost
Lito Lapid	NPC	160,300,000.00	163,580,568.31	Won
Allen Capuyan	PPP	6,173,922.75	6,173,922.75	Lost
Eric Martinez	Independent	0.00	397,677.77	Lost
Mar Valbuena	Independent	95,784.22	95,784.22	Lost
Jimmy Bondoc	PDP–Laban	2,585,568.80	2,585,568.80	Lost
Ronnel Arambulo	Makabayan	615,000.00	542,407.57	Lost
Bong Go	PDP–Laban	125,942,386.54	127,313,761.40	Won
Danilo Ramos	Makabayan	595,000.00	538,194.47	Lost
Ernesto Arellano	Katipunan	0.00	645,484.17	Lost
Marc Gamboa	Independent	0.00	124,901.59	Lost
Heidi Mendoza	Independent	1,000,000.00	2,107,911.00	Lost
Erwin Tulfo	Lakas	120,130,000.00	110,358,697.69	Won
Nur-Ana Sahidulla	Independent	30,000.00	27,904.07	Lost
Benhur Abalos	PFP	155,119,879.96	160,493,957.60	Lost
Manny Pacquiao	PFP	24,944,303.66	28,570,065.90	Lost
Bonifacio Bosita	Independent	1,303,620.00	3,228,583.63	Lost
Jose Olivar	Independent	0.00	87,848.72	Lost
Camille Villar	Nacionalista	159,640,000.00	179,642,664.21	Won
Bong Revilla	Lakas	125,032,740.35	128,134,515.23	Lost
Roberto Ballon	Independent	155.600	122,921.10	Lost
Relly Jose Jr.	KBL	0.00	137,346.47	Lost
Gregorio Honasan	RP	670,000.00	1,432,533.32	Lost
Luke Espiritu	PLM	0.00	387,208.60	Lost
Willie Revillame	Independent	0.00	104,699,745.44	Lost
Ronald dela Rosa	PDP–Laban	160,601,884.40	128,728,961.25	Won
Abigail Binay	NPC	161,000,000.00	157,860,166.89	Lost
Francis Tolentino	PFP	123,593,578.42	149,844,865.15	Lost
Ben Tulfo	Independent	74,111,000.00	72,681,451.23	Lost
Leody de Guzman	PLM	188,300.00	62,298.58	Lost

- Source: COMELEC

=== Candidates without submissions ===
All of these candidates lost:

- Roy Cabonegro (DPP)
- Michael Tapado (Partido Maharlika)
- Mody Floranda (Makabayan)
- Wilbert T. Lee (Aksyon Demokratiko) (Note: Lee withdrew on February 10, 2025, a day before the start of the official campaign so he is not needed to file his SOCE.)
- Wilson Amad (Independent)
- Arnel Escobal (Partido Maharlika)
