= Ronnel Arambulo =

Filipino fisherman (born 1976)

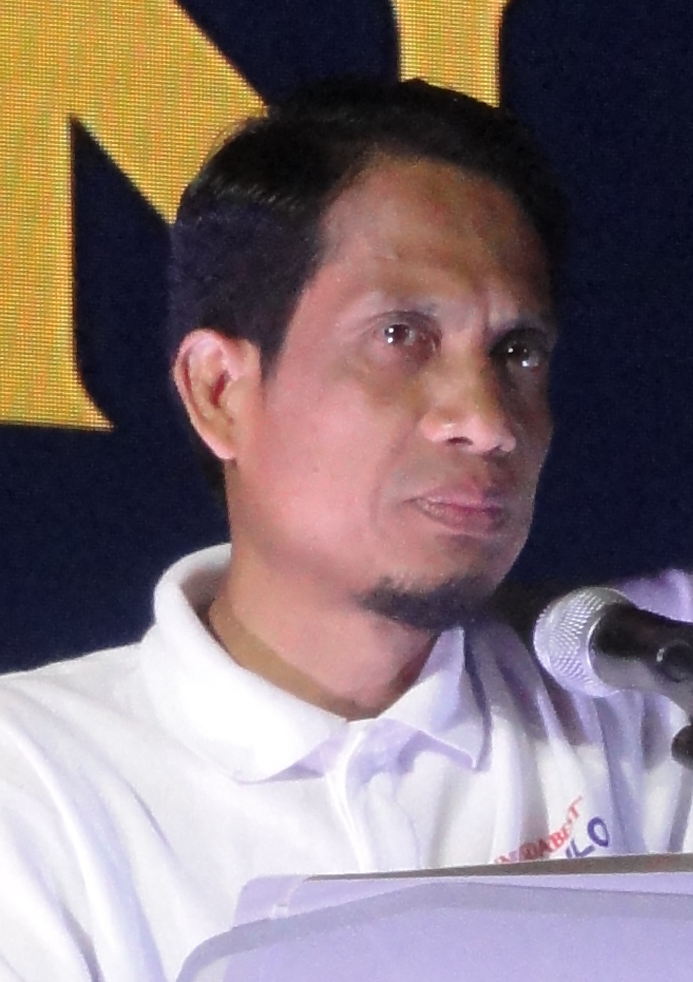
- Arambulo in 2024
- Born: Ronnel Gondraneos Arambulo; May 18, 1976 (age 50); Binangonan, Rizal, Philippines
- Occupations: Fisherman; activist
- Political party: Makabayan

Ronnel Gondraneos Arambulo (born May 18, 1976) is a Filipino fisherman, environmentalist, and activist who is currently the vice chaiperson of Pamalakaya. In the 2025 Philippine Senate election, he ran under the Makabayan slate but lost.

== Early life and education ==
Arambulo was born on May 18, 1976 in Malakaban, Binangonan, Rizal and graduated from Janosa National High School. He also enrolled in the University of Manila in 1995, before dropping out a year later. He also enrolled in the University of Rizal System in Angono, Rizal in 2005, before dropping out again a year later.

== Activism ==
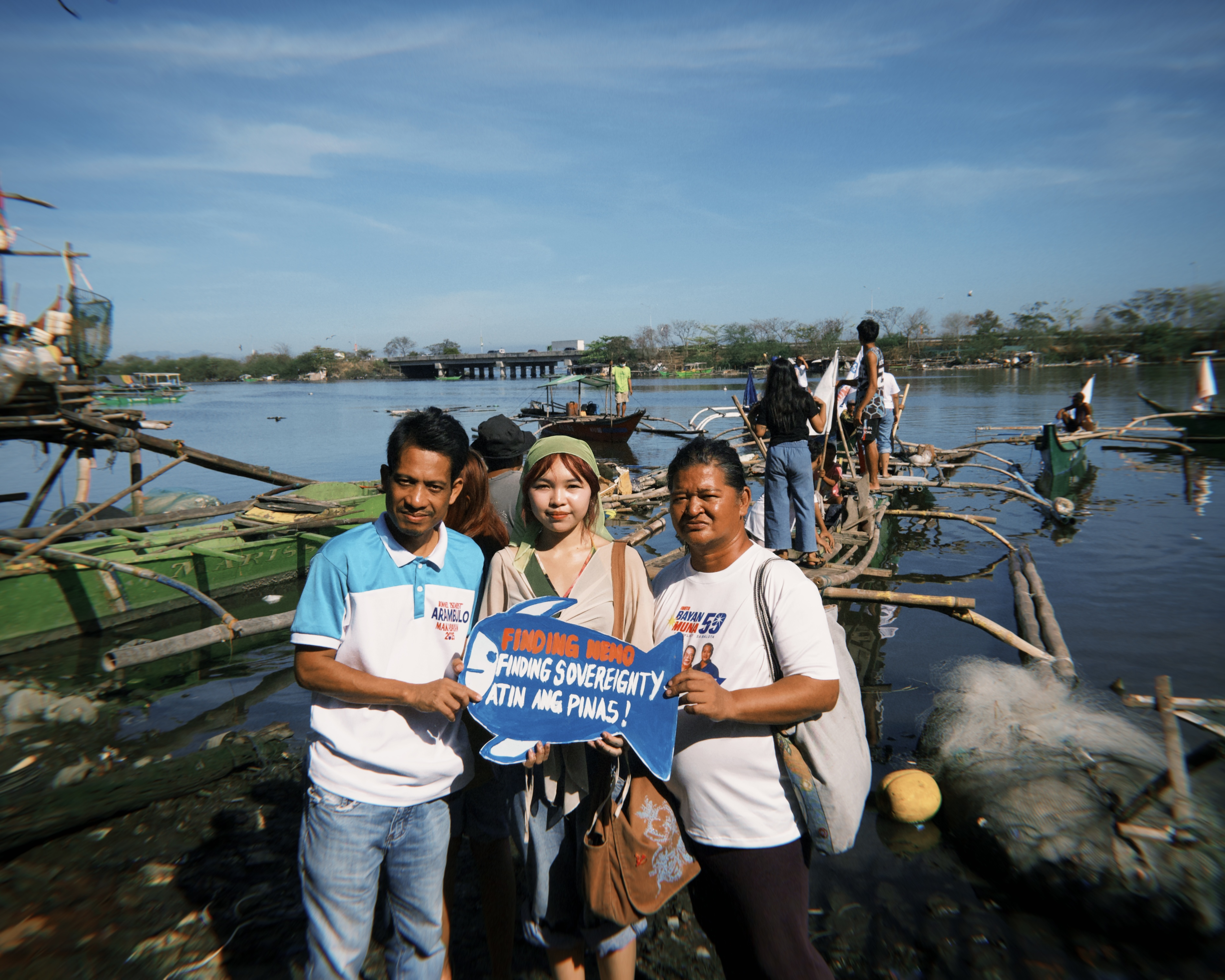
Arambulo during a fluvial protest against demolition and reclamation in Bacoor, Cavite.

Arambulo was a member of Anakbayan from 2005 to 2006. In 2006, he joined the Pambansang Lakas ng Kilusang Mamamalakaya ng Pilipinas (National Federation of Small Fisherfolk Organizations in the Philippines; Pamalakaya). He also became chairperson of Anakpawis chapters in his municipality and province.

Since 2008, Arambulo has been involved in grassroots campaigns to help fisherfolk and amplify their issues including land reclamation. PAMALAKAYA has been part of campaigns opposing reclamation projects as these would greatly damage the livelihood of fisherfolk.

In July 2021, he had been part of a coastal protest in Botolan, Zambales, marking five years since the Permanent Court of Arbitration issued its pro-Philippine ruling on the South China Sea dispute.

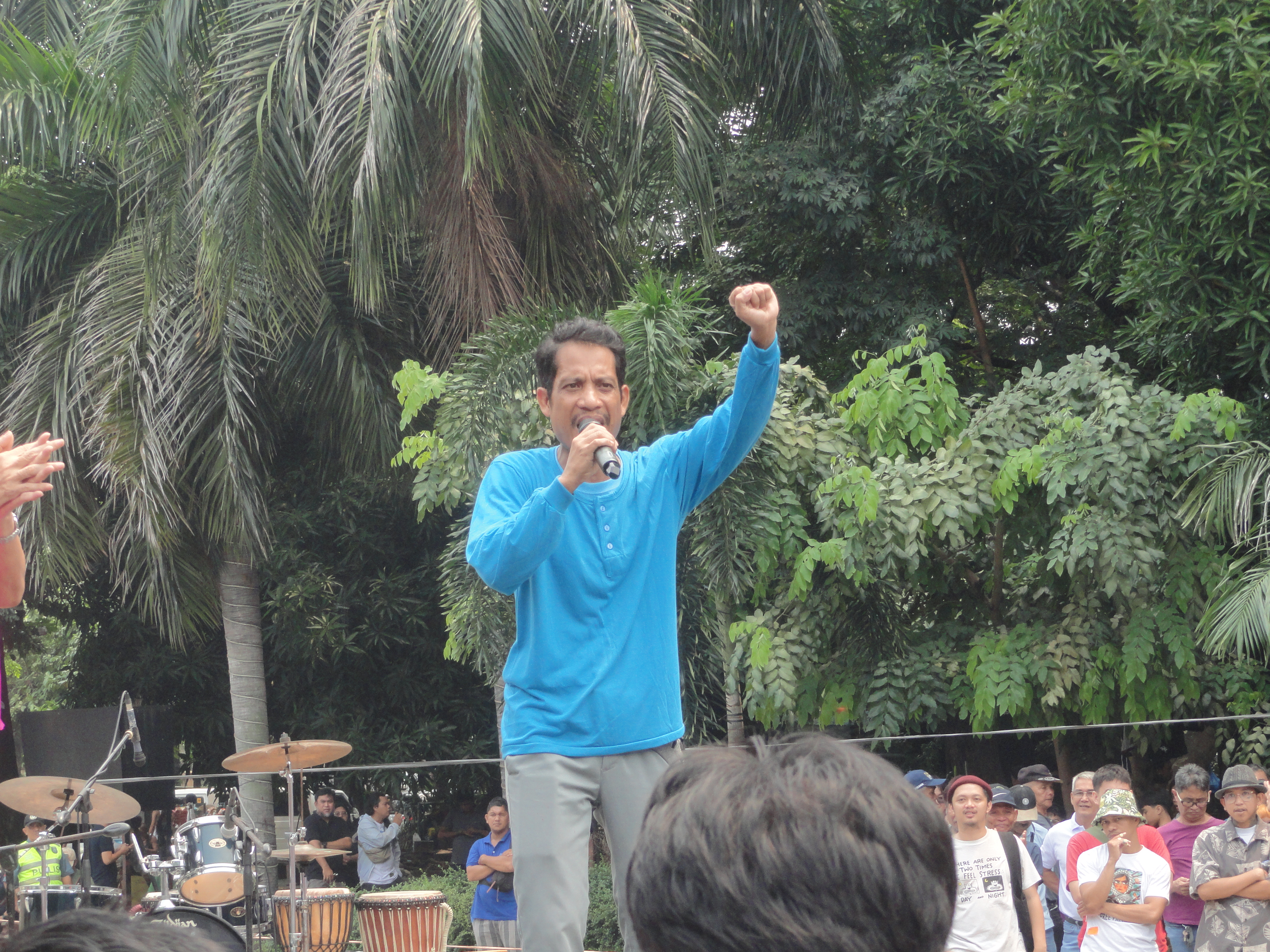
Arambulo at the Senate announcement of Makabayan for the 2025 Philippine general election.

In the run-up to the 2025 midterm elections, he was revealed to be part of the Makabayan Senatorial slate on August 19, 2024, at a gathering of the fishing community in Navotas. He said fisherfolk need representation in Senate, in order to address issues such as reclamation of Manila Bay, destruction of marine habitats, oil spills, mitigating natural disasters, and on the West Philippine Sea, asserting the sector’s rights to livelihood in the area and opposing the presence of big powers. He and ten other Makabayan Senatorial bets would file their Certificates of Candidacy (COC) on October 4, 2024. He would go on to lose the election after placing 39th, gaining 3,846,216 votes.

On December 4, 2024, Arambulo and 74 others filed the second impeachment complaint against Vice President Sara Duterte, citing betrayal of public trust for her office's alleged misuse of confidential funds. By February 2025, it was consolidated with two other complaints into a single impeachment complaint and signed by 240 lawmakers out of 305, reaching the 1/3 vote threshold and impeaching Vice President Duterte.

On January 26, 2026, Arambulo and 35 others filed the second impeachment complaint against President Bongbong Marcos, citing his potential involvement in the "BBM Parametric Formula" used by the Department of Public Works and Highways, which they alleged to have allowed systemic corruption in government, as well as his alleged involvement in kickback schemes and unprogrammed appropriations.
