= Allen Capuyan =

Filipino soldier

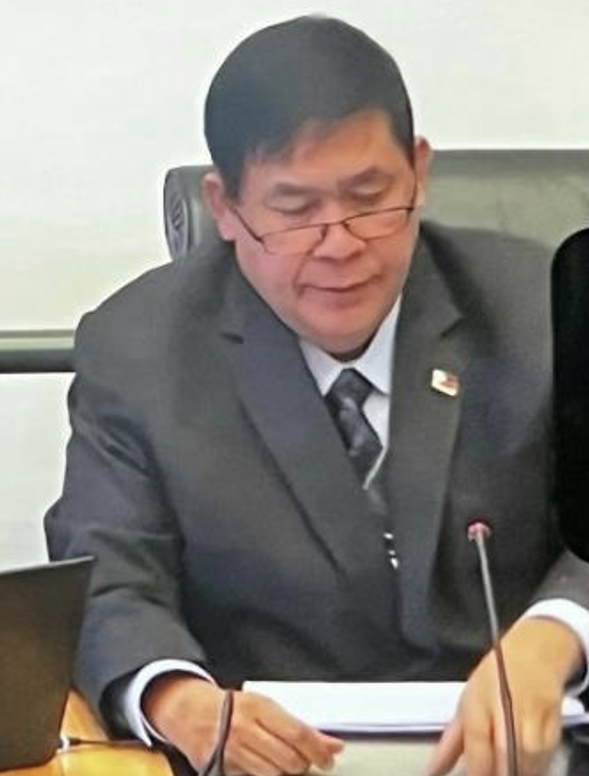

Chairperson of the National Commission on Indigenous Peoples
- In office 2019–2023
- President: Rodrigo Duterte; Bongbong Marcos
- Succeeded by: Jennifer Sibug-Las

Ethnographic Commissioner for Regions 11 and 13, NCIP
- In office 2016–2019
- President: Rodrigo Duterte

Chief for Operations of the Intelligence Service of the Armed Forces of the Philippines
- In office 2001–2010
- President: Gloria Macapagal Arroyo

Chief of the Intelligence Service Unit in Davao City
- In office 1997–2000
- President: Fidel Ramos; Joseph Estrada

Personal details
- Born: Allen Arat Capuyan; October 10, 1962 (age 64) Butuan, Agusan, Philippines
- Citizenship: Philippines
- Party: Partido Pilipino sa Pagbabago
- Spouse: Gloria Capuyan
- Education: Philippine Military Academy
- Profession: Soldier

Allen Arat Capuyan (born October 10, 1962) is a former military colonel, former chairperson of the National Commission on Indigenous Peoples, and a senatorial candidate in the 2025 Philippine Senate election. He allegedly was connected to the Hello Garci scandal and a corruption scandal at the Bureau of Customs.

== Early life ==
Allen Arat Capuyan was born on October 10, 1962. He graduated in the Philippine Military Academy class of 1983.

== Career ==
=== Military and Hello Garci ===
In 1997, he served as the Chief of the Intelligence Service Unit in Davao City until 2000. Just after, he served as the Chief for Operations of the Intelligence Service of the Armed Forces of the Philippines (ISAFP) under the Arroyo administration. In 2005, he was related to the Hello Garci scandal. In 2011, an ISAFP official said that he was allegedly the perpetrator of the burning of the Hello Garci tapes.

=== Manila International Airport Authority ===
Capuyan also served as the assistant general manager for security and emergency services of the Manila International Airport Authority. He took a leave of absence in August 2017 after an alleged involvement in smuggling ₱6,400,000,000 worth of shabu from China in May 2017. Customs fixer Mark Taguba said that he was linked to corruption of the Bureau of Customs. He allegedly was nicknamed "Big Brother" in his messages. Capuyan resigned in March 2018. He was also assigned as executive director of the National Secretariat of the National Task Force to End Local Communist Armed Conflict (NTF-ELAC) in March 2019.

=== National Commission on Indigenous Peoples ===
During the Duterte administration, he became the presidential adviser on indigenous peoples’ concerns. He was appointed as the ethnographic commissioner for regions 11 and 13 of the National Commission on Indigenous Peoples (NCIP). In 2019, he became the chairperson of the NCIP. On September 5, 2023, Capuyan stepped down as the chairperson of the NCIP, and was replaced by Jennifer Las. In 2023, he gained the Mindanao's Man of Outstanding Achievements in the Field of Public Service and Leadership Award.

=== 2025 Senate bid ===
In 2025, he became a senatorial candidate for the 2025 Philippine Senate election under the Partido Pilipino sa Pagbabago party. He lost the election, placing 47th.
