= AGRI Partylist =

Political party in the Philippines

AGRI
- — Philippine partylist —
- Full name: AGRI-AGRA na Reporma para sa Magsasaka ng Pilipinas
- Sector(s) represented: Agriculture
- Founded: January 9, 2005; 21 years ago
- Colors: Green

Current representation (20th Congress)
- Seats in the House of Representatives: 0 / 3 (Out of 63 party-list seats)

Website
- www.agripartylist.com

The AGRI-AGRA na Reporma para sa Magsasaka ng Pilipinas also known as the AGRI Partylist is an organization with party-list representation in the House of Representatives of the Philippines.

== History ==
AGRI Partylist was established on January 9, 2005 as an association of farmers and other workers in the agriculture industry in Davao City. It advocated for an anti agricultural smuggling law.

AGRI Partylist had partylist representation in the House of Representatives since 2013. Delphine Gan Lee was AGRI's representative from 2013 to 2019. Her husband Wilbert Lee, who was also a chair of the retail, food, real estate and construction conglomerate LKY Group of Companies, served the same role in the lower house of the Congress since 2022.

In 2024, fisherfolks organization Pamalakaya accused the LKY Group of Companies, owned by Wilbert Lee, of land-grabbing and harassment in Gubat, Sorsogon.

== Sector represented ==
AGRI Partylist claims to represent the interest of farmers and fisherfolks as well as families from marginalized groups who lack access to basic social services in the Philippines.

Peasant rights watchdog Tanggol Magsasaka included AGRI on its list of party-list groups that "exploit the struggles and aspirations of farmers" due to AGRI's links to the Lee family.

== Political positions ==
AGRI Partylist has pushed for the prioriritization of farmers and fisherfolks as beneficiaries of the Pantawid Pamilyang Pilipino Program (4Ps). It have also proposed the institutionalizing of the Kadiwa Centers set up by the Department of Agriculture.

== Electoral performance ==
Election	Votes	%	Seats
2010	49,635	0.16	0
2013	366,170	1.32	1
2016	833,821	2.58	2
2019	133,505	0.48	0
2022	393,987	1.07	1
2025	168,032	0.40	0

== Representatives to Congress ==
Period	1st representative	2nd representative
16th Congress; 2013–2016	Delphine Gan Lee	—N/a
17th Congress; 2016–2019	Delphine Gan Lee	Orestes Salon
18th Congress; 2019–2022	Out of Congress	
19th Congress; 2022–2025	Wilbert T. Lee	—N/a
Note: A party-list group, can win a maximum of three seats in the House of Representatives.
