= Candidates in the 2025 Philippine Senate election =

This is a list of candidates in the 2025 Philippine Senate election.

== Candidates on the ballot ==
These are the candidates accepted by the Commission on Elections (COMELEC), or were ordered added by the Supreme Court, and were included in the ballot.

#	Image	Candidate	Party	Alliance	Prior political experience
1		Benhur Abalos	PFP	Alyansa para sa Bagong Pilipinas	Secretary of the Interior and Local Government (2022–2024)
2		Jerome Adonis	Makabayan	Oposisyon ng Bayan	Secretary general of Kilusang Mayo Uno
3		Wilson Amad	Independent	—N/a	
4		Jocelyn Andamo	Makabayan	Oposisyon ng Bayan	Secretary general of Filipino Nurses United
5		Bam Aquino	KANP	KiBam	Senator (2013–2019)
6		Ronnel Arambulo	Makabayan	Oposisyon ng Bayan	Vice chairperson of Pamalakaya
7		Ernesto Arellano	KKK	—N/a	Founding President of National Confederation of Labor
8		Roberto Ballon	Independent	—N/a	Leader of Kapunungan sa Gagmay'ng Mangingisda sa Concepcion
9		Abigail Binay	NPC	Alyansa para sa Bagong Pilipinas	Mayor of Makati (2016–present)
10		Jimmy Bondoc	PDP	DuterTen	Member of the board of directors of Philippine Amusement and Gaming Corporation (2021–2022)
11		Bong Revilla	Lakas	Alyansa para sa Bagong Pilipinas	Incumbent senator (since 2019)
12		Bonifacio Bosita	Independent	Riding-in-tandem Team	Incumbent House representative for 1-Rider Partylist (2022–present)
13		Arlene Brosas	Makabayan	Oposisyon ng Bayan	Incumbent House representative for GABRIELA (since 2016)
14		Roy Cabonegro	DPP	—N/a	
15		Allen Capuyan	PPP	—N/a	Chairperson of the National Commission on Indigenous Peoples (2019–2023)
16		Teodoro Casiño	Makabayan	Oposisyon ng Bayan	House representative for Bayan Muna (2004–2013)
17		France Castro	Makabayan	Oposisyon ng Bayan	Incumbent House representative for ACT Teachers (since 2016)
18		Pia Cayetano	Nacionalista	Alyansa para sa Bagong Pilipinas	Incumbent senator (since 2019)
19		David d'Angelo	Bunyog	—N/a	
20		Angelo de Alban	Independent	—N/a	
21		Leody de Guzman	PLM	—N/a	Chairman of Bukluran ng Manggagawang Pilipino
22		Ronald dela Rosa	PDP	DuterTen	Incumbent senator (since 2019)
23		Mimi Doringo	Makabayan	Oposisyon ng Bayan	Secretary general of Kadamay
24		Arnel Escobal	PM	—N/a	
25		Luke Espiritu	PLM	—N/a	President of Bukluran ng Manggagawang Pilipino
26		Mody Floranda	Makabayan	Oposisyon ng Bayan	Chairperson of PISTON
27		Marc Gamboa	Independent	—N/a	
28		Bong Go	PDP	DuterTen	Incumbent senator (since 2019)
29		Norberto Gonzales	PDSP	—N/a	Secretary of National Defense (2009–2010)
30		Jesus Hinlo Jr.	PDP	DuterTen	Commissioner of the Presidential Anti-Corruption Commission (2022)
31		Gregorio Honasan	Reform PH	—N/a	Secretary of Information and Communications Technology (2019–2021); Senator (2007–2019)
32		Relly Jose Jr.	KBL	—N/a	
33		Panfilo Lacson	Independent	Alyansa para sa Bagong Pilipinas	Senator (2016–2022)
34		Raul Lambino	PDP	DuterTen	Administrator and chief executive officer of the Cagayan Economic Zone Authority (2017–2022)
35		Lito Lapid	NPC	Alyansa para sa Bagong Pilipinas	Incumbent senator (since 2019)
36		Wilbert T. Lee (later withdrew)	Aksyon	—N/a	Incumbent House representative for AGRI Partylist (since 2022)
37		Amirah Lidasan	Makabayan	Oposisyon ng Bayan	Co-chairperson of Sandugo Movement of Moro and Indigenous Peoples for Self-Determination
38		Rodante Marcoleta	Independent	DuterTen	Incumbent House representative for SAGIP Partylist (since 2016)
39		Imee Marcos	Nacionalista	Alyansa para sa Bagong Pilipinas	Incumbent senator (since 2019)
40		Norman Marquez	Independent	—N/a	
41		Eric Martinez	Independent	—N/a	Incumbent House representative from Valenzuela's 2nd district (since 2016)
42		Richard Mata	Independent	DuterTen	
43		Sonny Matula	WPP	—N/a	President of the Federation of Free Workers
44		Liza Maza	Makabayan	Oposisyon ng Bayan	Lead convenor of National Anti-Poverty Commission (2016–2018)
45		Heidi Mendoza	Independent	—N/a	Commissioner of the Commission on Audit (2011–2015); Under-Secretary-General for the UN OIOS (2015–2019)
46		Jose Montemayor Jr.	Independent	—N/a	
47		Subair Mustapha	WPP	—N/a	
48		Jose Olivar	Independent	—N/a	
49		Willie Ong (later withdrew)	Aksyon	—N/a	
50		Manny Pacquiao	PFP	Alyansa para sa Bagong Pilipinas	Senator (2016–2022)
51		Francis Pangilinan	Liberal	KiBam	Senator (2016–2022)
52		Ariel Querubin	Nacionalista	Riding-in-tandem Team	Colonel, Philippine Marine Corps
53		Apollo Quiboloy	Independent	DuterTen	
54		Danilo Ramos	Makabayan	Oposisyon ng Bayan	Chairperson of Kilusang Magbubukid ng Pilipinas
55		Willie Revillame	Independent	—N/a	
56		Vic Rodriguez	Independent	DuterTen	Executive Secretary (2022)
57		Nur-Ana Sahidulla	Independent	—N/a	House representative from Sulu's 2nd district (2013–2016)
58		Phillip Salvador	PDP	DuterTen	
59		Tito Sotto	NPC	Alyansa para sa Bagong Pilipinas	Senator (2010–2022; Senate president (2018–2022)
60		Michael Tapado	PM	—N/a	
61		Francis Tolentino	PFP	Alyansa para sa Bagong Pilipinas	Incumbent senator (since 2019)
62		Ben Tulfo	Independent	—N/a	
63		Erwin Tulfo	Lakas	Alyansa para sa Bagong Pilipinas	Incumbent House representative for ACT-CIS Partylist (since 2023)
64		Mar Valbuena	Independent	—N/a	Chairperson of Manibela
65		Leandro Verceles Jr.	Independent	—N/a	Former governor of Catanduanes (2001–2007)
66		Camille Villar	Nacionalista	Alyansa para sa Bagong Pilipinas	Incumbent House representative from Las Piňas (since 2019)

== Rejected candidacies ==
These are the people who filed to be candidates, but were rejected by the COMELEC, ordered by day of filing:

1 October

1. David Chan
2. Alexander Encarnacion
3. Felipe Montealto Jr.
4. Janice Padilla
5. Joseph Dy
6. Najar Salih
7. Daniel Magtira
8. Happy Lubarbio
9. Norman Marquez
10. Phil delos Reyes
11. Marc Gamboa
12. Miguelino Caturan
13. Sunang Ditanongun

2 October

1. Victoriano Inte
2. Eric Negapatan
3. Magno Manalo
4. Bethsaida Lopez
5. Manuel Andrada
6. Jonry Gargarita

3 October

1. Jose Bunilla
2. Jaime Balmas
3. Elpidio Rosales Jr.
4. Robert Agad
5. Khaled Casimra
6. Jimmy Salapantan
7. Rex Noel
8. Roel Pacquiao

4 October

1. Froilan Serafico
2. Ernesto Balite
3. Elvis Beniga

5 October

1. Warlito Bovier
2. Wilson Aclan
3. Charito Billones
4. Jerson Ares
5. Primo Capuno Jr.
6. Leodegario Estrella
7. Richard Nicolas
8. Rolando Plaza
9. Virginia Sabit

6 October

1. Junbert Guigayuma
2. Sixto Lagare
3. John Rafael Escobar

7 October

1. Pedro Ordiales
2. James Reyes Jr.
3. Nelson Ancajas
4. Maria Fe Era
5. Diego Palomares
6. Gerard Arcega
7. Mario Pagaragan Jr.
8. Angelo de Alban
9. Luther Meniano
10. Hernando Bruce
11. Alice Jumalon
12. Eulogio Partosa
13. Epifanio Perez
14. Mario Valbuena Jr.
15. Freddie Maiquez
16. Leo Cadion
17. Getter Malinao
18. Salipada Amir Hussin
19. Joel Apolinario
20. Allen Capuyan
21. Artemio Maquiso
22. Jose Tam
23. Oscar Ongjoco
24. Jacinto Bonayag
25. Ferdinand Tuzara
26. Agapito Casipong
27. Fernando Diaz
28. Orlando de Guzman
29. Edgardo Dugue
30. Jefrey Andrino
31. Nheling Plaza
32. Eduardo Bautista

8 October

1. Peter Joemel Advincula
2. Princess Jade de Leon
3. Jovilyn Aceron
4. Leandro Verceles
5. Fernando Advincula
6. Joseph Delgado
7. Eric Alcantara
8. Rosalin Cay
9. Randy Red
10. Romulo San Ramon
11. Abel Adorable
12. Mercedita Acoplado
13. Randy Restum
14. Emilio Chan
15. Devienido Biazon Jr.
16. Rodolfo Basilan
17. Primo Aquino
18. Roel Lamoste
19. Vicente Domingo
20. Gem Domagtoy
21. Monique Kokkinaras
22. Injim Bunayog
23. Ismael Bajo
24. Omar Tomanong
25. Salvador Cabalida
26. Berteni Causing
27. Melchor Lucañas
28. Antonio Par
29. Robert Marcos Tallano Tagean
30. Loreto Banosan
31. Faith Ugsad
32. Wilfredo Red
33. Edmundo Rubi
34. Patrick Artajo
35. Rafael Chico
36. Romeo Macaragg
37. Celeste Aguillar
38. Shirley Cuatchin
39. Ricarda Arguilles
40. Sonny Pimentel
41. Enrique Olonan
42. Willie Ricablanca Jr.
43. Alexander Lague
44. Melissa Fortes
45. Roberto Sembrano
46. Gabriel Chaclag

== Candidates that withdrew ==
These withdrew after filing their candidacies prior to approval:

- Delfin Lorenzana (Independent), former secretary of national defense
  Lorenzana withdrew his candidacy on October 8.

These withdrew after the approval of candidacies:

- Chavit Singson (Independent), former mayor of Narvacan, Ilocos Sur
  Singson announced he is withdrawing his bid for Senate on January 12, citing health concerns. Singson made his withdrawal official on January 16.
- Francis Leo Marcos (Independent)
  Marcos was one of the aspirants disqualified by the commission. On January 21, 2025, the Supreme Court later granted Marcos a temporary restraining order against the commission's ruling, allowing him to be listed on the ballot. Two days later, Marcos withdrew his candidacy.
- Wilbert T. Lee (Aksyon Demokratiko)
  Lee withdrew his candidacy on February 10, citing insufficient political machinery to mount a national campaign.
- Willie Ong (Aksyon Demokratiko)
  Ong announced his intention to withdraw his candidacy on February 13, citing ill health. His wife Liza filed paperwork for him to formally withdraw on February 21.

== Declined to be candidates ==
These declined to run for senator, or ran for other positions in 2025.

- Leila de Lima (Liberal), former senator and secretary of justice
  De Lima declined to run for senator. She is running for House representative as Mamamayang Liberal party-list nominee instead.
- Chel Diokno (Akbayan), chairman of the Free Legal Assistance Group and senatorial candidate in 2019 and 2022
  Diokno declined to run for senator. He is running for House representative as Akbayan party-list nominee instead.
- Paolo Duterte (HTL), incumbent House representative from Davao City's 1st district
  Duterte was brought up by Vice President Sara Duterte, his sister, as a possible candidate. He is running for re-election under Hugpong sa Tawong Lungsod instead.
- Rodrigo Duterte (HTL), former president of the Philippines
  Duterte was brought up by Vice President Sara Duterte, his daughter, as a possible candidate. He is running for mayor of Davao City under Hugpong sa Tawong Lungsod instead.
- Sebastian Duterte (HTL), incumbent mayor of Davao City
  Duterte was brought up by Vice President Sara Duterte, his sister, as a possible candidate. He is running for vice mayor of Davao City under Hugpong sa Tawong Lungsod instead.
- Richard Gomez (PFP), incumbent House representative from Leyte's 4th district
  Gomez is running for re-election.
- Isko Moreno (Aksyon), former mayor of Manila and candidate for president in 2022
  Moreno is running for mayor of Manila.
- Leni Robredo (Liberal), former vice president
  Robredo is running for mayor of Naga, Camarines Sur.
- Rufus Rodriguez (CDP), incumbent House representative from Cagayan de Oro's 2nd district
  Rodriguez is running for re-election.
- Yedda Marie Romualdez (Tingog), incumbent House representative for Tingog Party List
  Romualdez is running for re-election.
- Gilbert Teodoro (PRP), incumbent Secretary of National Defense
  Teodoro did not run and remained as Secretary of National Defense.
- Antonio Trillanes (Aksyon), former senator
  Trillanes is running for mayor of Caloocan.
