= 2028 Philippine Senate election =

36th Philippine senatorial election

- May 8, 2028

12 (of the 24) seats to the Senate of the Philippines 13 seats needed for a majority
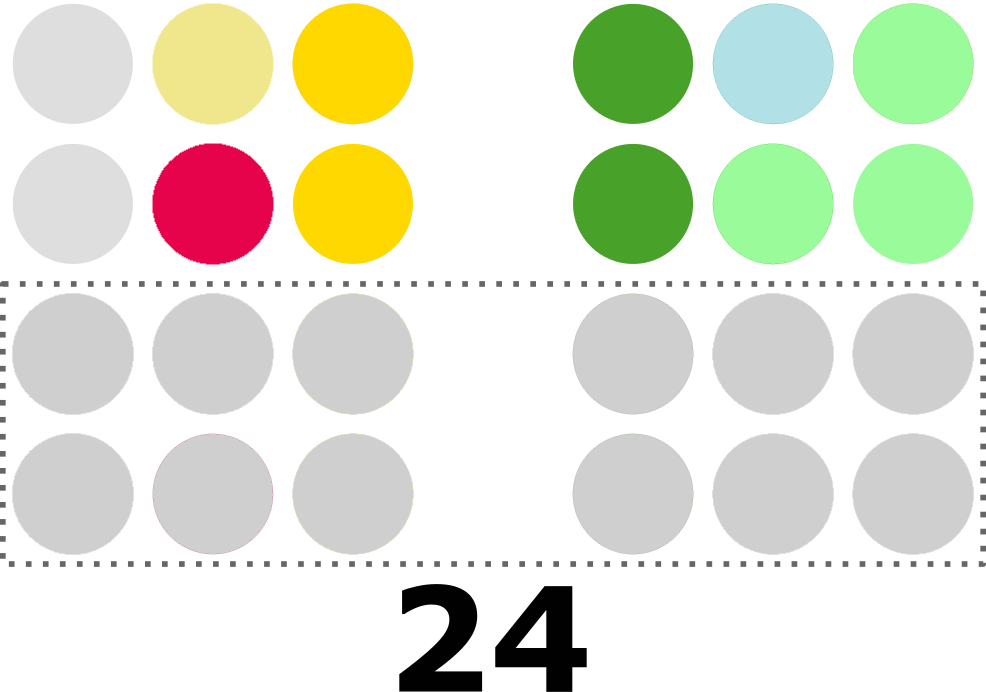
- Composition of the Senate before the election, with the seats up for election inside the box.
Incumbent Senate President
Sherwin Gatchalian
NPC

The 36th election of members to the Senate of the Philippines is scheduled to be held on May 8, 2028, within the 2028 Philippine general election. The seats of the 12 senators elected in 2022 are going to be contested in this election. The senators who will be elected in this election will serve until 2034, joining the winners of the 2025 election to form the Senate's delegation to the 21st Congress of the Philippines, with the senators elected in 2025 serving until 2031.

== Background ==
In the 2025 election, the administration slate Alyansa para sa Bagong Pilipinas backed by president Bongbong Marcos won a plurality of the seats in the Philippine Senate. Leading up to the opening of the 20th Congress, Senator-elect Tito Sotto expressed his openness to becoming Senate president if he has sufficient support to be elected. Sotto previously held this position from 2018 to 2022. On May 17, Sotto revealed that a number of Senators have expressed their support for his return to the senate presidency. In response, Senate President Francis Escudero, who has held the position since 2024, said it is up to the majority on who will lead the Senate in the next Congress. On July 28, 2025, Escudero was re-elected to his position, garnering 19 votes, defeating Sotto's 5 votes. On September 8, 2025, Sotto reclaimed the presidency after garnering enough votes to oust Escudero.

== Electoral system ==
The Philippines has a 24-member Senate elected at-large. Every three years since 1995, 12 seats are contested. For 2028, the seats last elected in 2022 will be contested. Each voter has 12 votes, of which one can vote for one to twelve candidates, or a multiple non-transferable vote; the twelve candidates with the most votes are elected.

Senators are limited to serving two consecutive terms, although they are eligible for a third (and succeeding) non-consecutive term. Only half of the seats are up in every senatorial election. The winning Senators will succeed those elected in 2022, and will join those elected in 2025 to form the 21st Congress.

Each party or coalition endorses a slate of candidates, typically not exceeding a 12-person ticket. A party may also choose to invite "guest candidates" to complete its slate. The party may even include, with the candidates' consent, independent candidates and candidates from other parties as the party's guest candidates. Parties also may form coalitions to endorse a multi-party slate of candidates.

Winning candidates are proclaimed by the Commission on Elections (COMELEC), sitting as the National Board of Canvassers (NBOC). The NBOC usually proclaims Senators-elect by batches, if that candidate can no longer fall to worse than twelfth place in the tally. Post-proclamation disputes are handled by the Senate Electoral Tribunal, a body composed of six Senators and three justices from the Supreme Court.

As this election is held concurrently with a presidential election, presidential candidates may present a senatorial ticket of candidates.

== Term-limited and retiring incumbents ==
=== Term-limited incumbents ===
The following are serving a successive six-year term and are barred from seeking reelection:

1. Win Gatchalian (NPC), intent unknown
  Gatchalian is seen as a potential vice presidential candidate for 2028.
2. Risa Hontiveros (Akbayan), intent unknown
  Hontiveros is speculated to be candidate for the presidency in 2028. She is also seen as a potential vice presidential candidate.
3. Joel Villanueva (Independent), retiring from politics
  Villanueva said that he is retiring from public office in 2028.
4. Juan Miguel Zubiri (Independent), retiring from politics
  Zubiri announced that he will not run for public office in 2028.

=== Retiring incumbents ===
The following senator's term is ending in 2028, is eligible to run, but plans to retire:

1. Robin Padilla (PDP–Laban), retiring from politics
  Padilla stated that he is retiring in 2028 after his first term. He later said that if former president Rodrigo Duterte asks him to run as vice president as Sara Duterte's running mate under PDP–Laban, he would do so, but has no plans otherwise.

== Marginal seats ==
These are the marginal seats that had a winning margin of 5% or less against the 13th placed candidate in the 2022 election, in ascending order via margin:

Incumbent	Party	2022 margin	2028 results
Jinggoy Estrada	PMP	3.32%	Incumbent intent unknown
Risa Hontiveros	Akbayan	3.88%	Incumbent term-limited
JV Ejercito	NPC	4.64%	Incumbent intent unknown

== Participating parties ==
In both chambers of Congress, members are organized into "blocs", akin to parliamentary groups elsewhere. In keeping with the traditions of the Third Philippine Republic which was under a two-party system, there are two main blocs, the majority and minority blocs; this is although the country is now in a multi-party system. Those who voted for the Senate President are from the majority bloc, while those who did not (if there are more than two candidates for the Senate Presidency) will vote amongst themselves on who will be the minority bloc. Those who belong to neither bloc shall be the independent minority bloc. Members can also be from the independent bloc. Each bloc can have members from multiple parties. Only the majority and minority blocs have voting privileges in committees.

Parties in the Senate at the end of the 20th Congress of the Philippines
Party	Current seats			Bloc membership		Political affiliation	
Party	Up	Not Up	Total	Majority	Minority	2025	2028
NPC	4	2	6 / 24	Most	One	Alyansa	TBA
Nacionalista	1	3	4 / 24	One	Most	Alyansa	TBA
PDP	1	2	3 / 24	None	All	DuterTen	RAGE Coalition
Akbayan	1	0	1 / 24	One	None	KiBam	TBA
KANP	0	1	1 / 24	One	None	KiBam	TBA
Lakas	0	1	1 / 24	One	None	Alyansa	TBA
Liberal	0	1	1 / 24	One	None	KiBam	TBA
PMP	1	0	1 / 24	None	One	—N/a	TBA
Independent	4	2	6 / 24	Most	Some	—N/a	
Total	12	12	24 / 24				

== Candidates ==
=== Declared ===
The following individuals have publicly declared their intention to run for the Senate in the 2028 elections:

- Rowena Guanzon (Independent), former COMELEC and COA Commissioner
- Cielo Magno (Independent), economist and former Finance Undersecretary for Fiscal Policy and Monitoring
- Salvador Panelo (PDP), former chief presidential legal counsel and presidential spokesperson under Rodrigo Duterte
- Raffy Tulfo (Independent), incumbent Senator
- Anjo Yllana (PDP), actor and former member of the Quezon City Council from the fifth district

=== Potential ===
The following individuals have not officially declared their candidacy but are seen as likely contenders or have expressed interest in running:

- Joy Belmonte (SBP), mayor of Quezon City
- Claire Castro (Independent), incumbent undersecretary of the Presidential Communications Office
- Alan Peter Cayetano (Independent), incumbent Senator
- JV Ejercito (NPC), incumbent Senator
- Francis Escudero (NPC), incumbent Senator
- Jinggoy Estrada (PMP), incumbent Senator
- Loren Legarda (NPC), incumbent Senator
- Mark Villar (Nacionalista), incumbent Senator
- TG Guingona (KANP), former Senator
- Teodoro Casiño (Makabayan), former representative for Bayan Muna
- Leila De Lima (Liberal), former Senator and incumbent representative for Mamamayang Liberal
- Chel Diokno (Akbayan), incumbent representative for Akbayan
- Luke Espiritu (PLM), Lawyer and labor leader
- Heidi Mendoza (Independent), former COA Commissioner
- Vico Sotto (Independent), mayor of Pasig
- Francis Zamora (PFP), mayor of San Juan

=== Declined ===
- Gerville Luistro (Lakas), incumbent Representative for Batangas's second district
- Isko Moreno (Aksyon), incumbent mayor of Manila
- Antonio Trillanes (Aksyon), former Senator
- Leni Robredo (Liberal), former vice president and mayor of Naga, Camarines Sur
- Mike Defensor (Reform PH), Former Representative for Anakalusugan

== Opinion polls ==
=== Before filing of candidacies ===
#	Jul 18–20, 2025		Feb 2–6, 2026		Apr 1–3, 2026		May 26 to June 2, 2026		Jun 23–25, 2026			Jun 28–Jul 6, 2026			Jul 4–11, 2026			Jul 13–16, 2026			September 17 - 24, 2026	
#	Sample size: 2,400		Sample size: 2,000		Sample size: 1,500		Sample Size: 2,637		Sample size: 1,500			Sample size: 2,400			Sample size: 1,200			Sample size: 1,438			Sample Size: 2,400	
#	Tangere		Tangere		Tangere		Arkipelago Analytics		Tangere			Pulse Asia			OCTA			Momentum Research			Pulse Asia	
#	Name	%	Name	%	Name	%	Name	%	Name		%	Name		%	Name		%	Name		%	Name	
1	Sotto	61.00	R. Tulfo	49.80	R. Tulfo	44.80	Duterte	48	R. Tulfo	37.60		Padilla	48.40		Padilla	53.90		Padilla	43.90		Poe	50.2
2	R. Tulfo	55.26	Poe	43.50	Poe	40.10	Robredo	48	Sotto	36.90		Sotto	47.90		R. Tulfo	47.40		Cayetano	43.40		Cayetano	46.5
3	Poe	46.05	Cayetano	38.00	Legarda	39.30	Padilla	48	Poe	35.60		R. Tulfo	43.90		Cayetano	45.40		R. Tulfo	38.20		Padilla	45.9
4	Escudero	37.66	Legarda	38.00	Moreno	38.20	Sotto	45	Moreno	34.70		Cayetano	43.20		Poe	44.50		S. Duterte	34.80		Tulfo	44.4
5	Legarda	37.00	P. Duterte	37.10	S. Duterte	37.90	Legarda	45	S. Duterte	34.30		Legarda	40.30		Sotto	42.00		Poe	33.70		Duterte	37.2
6	S. Duterte	36.57	S. Duterte	36.60	P. Duterte	36.90	Tulfo	42	P. Duterte	34.10		Pacquiao	35.60		Legarda	39.00		Sotto	32.90		Pacquiao	36.5
7	Cayetano	34.80	Gatchalian	34.40	Cayetano	36.40	Cayetano	42	Padilla	32.30		N. Binay	32.40		Pacquiao	34.50		Legarda	31.00		Legarda	33.0
8	B. Tulfo	32.22	Pacquiao	31.20	Escudero	31.90	Duterte	39	Escudero	30.90		Angara	27.20		P. Duterte	34.30		Pacquiao	24.20		Binay	31.7
9	Padilla	30.08	Escudero	30.20	Pacquiao	29.30	Escudero	39	Angara	28.30		Villar	26.10		B. Tulfo	31.00		N. Binay	23.60		Escudero	30.1
10	Abalos	29.00	B. Tulfo	30.10	Angara	29.20	Villar	39	Pacquiao	26.10		B. Tulfo	20.70		A. Binay	26.10		Escudero	23.00		Angara	26.3
11	Angara	27.65	Belmonte	29.30	Gatchalian	24.80	Dantes	35	Cayetano	25.00		Estrada	19.50		Estrada	25.50		P. Duterte	22.40		Tulfo	21.5
12	Revilla	26.74	Angara	28.40	B. Tulfo	24.10	Poe	35	Diokno	20.30		Revillame	19.00		Lapid	25.00		C. Villar	19.10		Lapid	19.8
13	Gatchalian	25.87	Diokno	27.40	Diokno	22.30	Estrada	33	Abalos	19.90		Escudero	17.20		Escudero	23.20		Estrada	18.30		Estrada	18.2
14	Estrada	25.00	Ejercito	24.60	Dantes	21.70	Tulfo	33	Legarda	19.60		Defensor	17.10		Pimentel	21.20		B. Tulfo	17.60		Revillame	17.7
15	A. Binay	24.60	Abalos	23.40	Abalos	21.30	Binay	33	Gatchalian	19.40		Roxas	17.10		M. Villar	19.50		A. Binay	15.00		Defensor	16.9
16	—N/a		Tolentino	21.70	A. Binay	20.50	Belmonte	33	Abalos	17.00		Angara	19.20		Angara	14.60		Gatchalian	18.40		Villar	16.6
17	—N/a		Bosita	21.60	Bosita	19.90	Viceral	33	Lapid	16.90		Panelo	18.40		M. Villar	14.50		Abalos	18.30		Roxas	16.5
18	—N/a		A. Binay	21.40	Bondoc	19.00	Bondoc	30	Salvador	14.90		Ejercito	18.10		Pimentel	13.50		Dantes	17.80		Ejercito	15.5
19	—N/a		Bondoc	21.20	N. Binay	17.40	Angara	30	Bondoc	14.90		Honasan	16.90		Ejercito	12.90		N. Binay	17.40		Pimentel	14.2
20	—N/a		Pimentel	20.90	Belmonte	17.30	Pacquiao	30	Ejercito	14.20		Salvador	16.30		Revilla	12.70		Tolentino	16.70		Gatchalian	14.1
21	—N/a		de Lima	19.80	Ejercito	16.30	Gatchalian	28	Tolentino	14.00		Torre	15.50		Diokno	12.40		A. Binay	16.10		Revilla	13.8
22	—N/a		Zamora	19.80	de Lima	15.90	Ejercito	28	de Lima	13.60		Revillame	15.10		Salvador	11.80		Mata	15.10		Abalos	13.7
23	—N/a		N. Binay	19.50	Defensor	15.70	Guanzon	27	Gatchalian	13.40		Bosita	14.90		Tolentino	11.40		Belmonte	14.50		Diokno	11.8
24	—N/a		Mata	19.40	Mata	15.40	Defensor	27	Revilla	13.10		de Lima	13.70		de Lima	11.40		Bondoc	13.70		Tolentino	11.5
