= 2025 Philippine general election =

- May 12, 2025
- Registered: 69,673,653
- Turnout: 57,350,968 (82.20% ▼0.78pp from 2022)
- Senate election

12 (of the 24) seats to the Senate of the Philippines 13 seats needed for a majority
Alliance	Alyansa	DuterTen	KiBam
Seats won	6	3+2 guests	2
Popular vote	142,193,487	119,817,018	36,315,128
Percentage	33.18	27.96	8.48
Alliance	Oposisyon ng Bayan	Nacionalista (Note: There were 4 Nacionalista candidates in this election. Two (Pia Cayetano and Camille Villar) ran under the Alyansa slate; another (Ariel Querubin) ran under the Riding-in-tandem Team with Bonifacio Bosita; and the other (Imee Marcos) was not included in any ticket. Cayetano, Marcos and Villar won a seat each. The figures here are for Marcos; Cayetano and Villar's vote totals are included in the Alyansa totals while Querubin's votes are included in the Riding-in-tandem Team.)
Seats won	0	1
Popular vote	28,001,064	13,339,227
Percentage	6.53	3.11
Senate President before election
Francis Escudero
NPC
Elected Senate President
Francis Escudero
NPC
- House of Representatives elections
- All 317 seats to the House of Representatives of the Philippines; 159 seats needed for a majority
Party	Vote %	Seats	+/–
Lakas	32.87	103	+77
NUP	12.05	32	−1
NPC	11.83	31	−4
PFP	10.47	27	+25
Nacionalista	9.36	22	−14
Liberal	3.08	6	−4
Aksyon	2.66	2	+2
PDP–Laban	1.32	2	−64
LDP	0.62	2	+1
PRP	0.58	1	−2
PMP	0.53	2	+2
UNA	0.28	1	0
CDP	0.25	1	0
Others	14.08	22	−12
Party-list	—	64	+1
This lists parties that won seats. See the complete results below.
Speaker before	Speaker after
Martin Romualdez; Lakas	Martin Romualdez; Lakas

The 2025 Philippine general election was held on May 12, 2025. During this midterm election, where the winners take office mid-way through the term of President Bongbong Marcos, all 317 seats in the House of Representatives and 12 of the 24 seats in the Senate were contested to form the 20th Congress of the Philippines. Local elections were also held for the executive and legislative branches in every province, city, and municipality in the country. The first regular election to the Bangsamoro Parliament was supposed to be held within the general election after it was postponed in 2022 but was scheduled to be held later in September 2026.

This was the first general election to be held following the 2023 Philippine barangay and Sangguniang Kabataan elections. This election was also the first automated election to be overseen by the South Korean firm Miru Systems after the Commission of Elections (COMELEC) disqualified Smartmatic from participating in future elections.

Lakas–CMD remained the most dominant party inside the House of Representatives, as 104 of its congressional candidates in the 2025 midterm elections had secured seats for the 20th Congress, adding they would continue to support the presidential administration of Marcos. Only six of the twelve elected senators are from the Marcos alliance; of those six, one (Camille Villar) is only partly in his camp, as she also accepted endorsement from Sara Duterte. Four of the elected senators are in the Duterte camp, including the president's sister Imee Marcos. Two were in the top three vote-winners, ahead of any Marcos candidate. The elections are likely to have an effect on the impeachment of Sara Duterte.

This general election saw a turnout of 82.2%, the highest for a midterm election, with 57,350,968 ballots being cast from 69,673,653 registered voters.

== Background ==
=== Voter registration ===
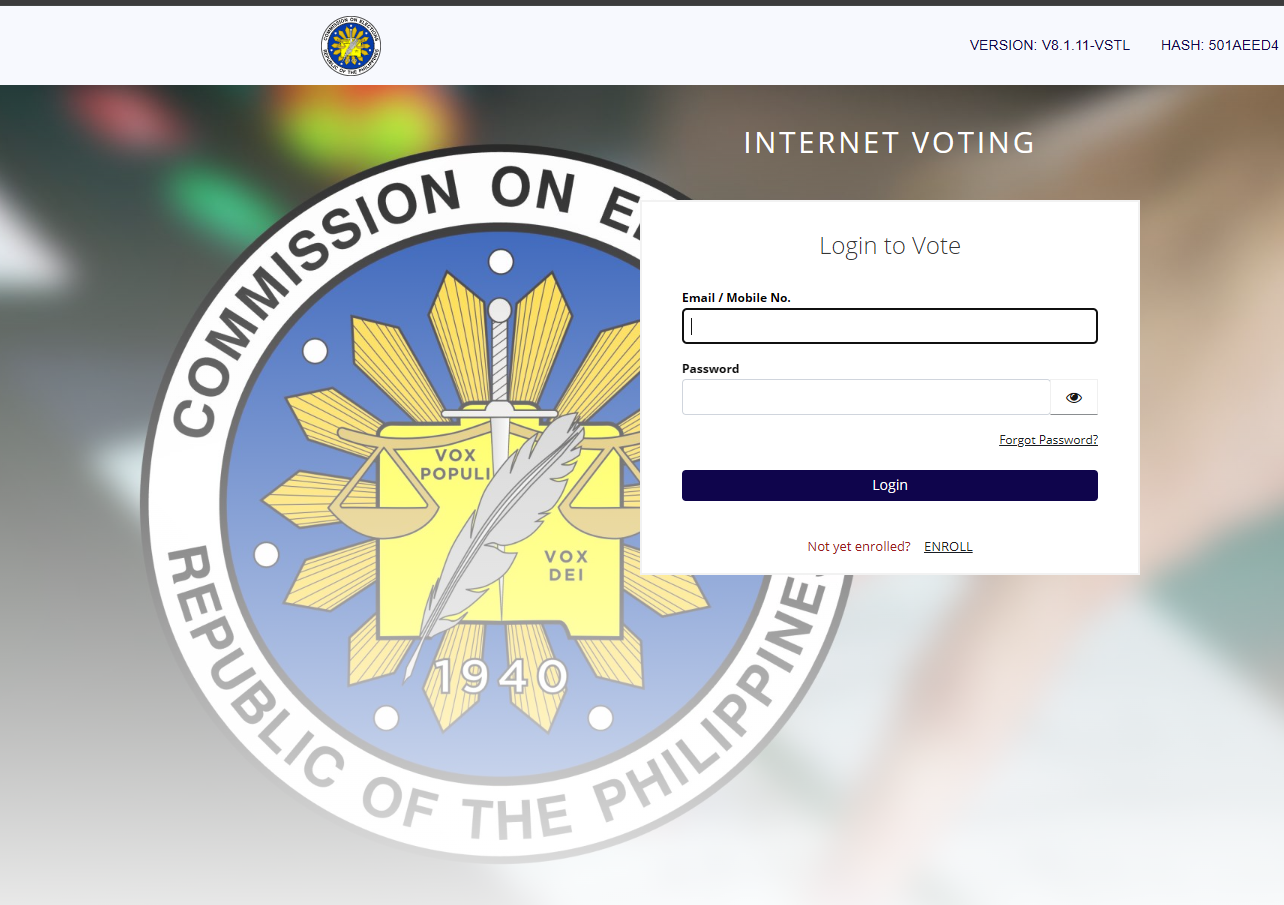
Screenshot of the Online Voting Website for Overseas Filipinos

Philippine citizens must be at least 18 years old by noontime of election day in order to vote. In addition, Overseas Filipino Workers (OFWs) must have a valid Philippine passport. COMELEC implemented the Register Anywhere Program in July 2022, converting shopping malls, certain churches, and plazas as offices for the program. OFWs are supposed to register for the elections by going to their nearest Philippine embassy.

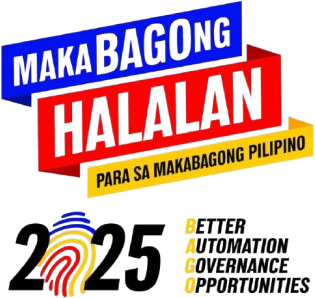
Logo for the 2025 election used by COMELEC for public materials.

In May 2023, the Commission on Elections (COMELEC) recorded a total of 68 million registered voters. The commission estimated an increase of three million voters for the 2025 elections, creating a total of 71 million voters registered to vote in the election.

=== Implementation of Miru Systems ===
==== Disqualification of Smartmatic ====
On November 29, 2023, the COMELEC disqualified Smartmatic from all procurement processes conducted by the agency amid the company's involvement with the alleged bribery schemes concerning COMELEC Chairman Andres Bautista, citing an "imminent threat to the strength and integrity" of the country's electoral process.

==== Public bidding for the automated voting system ====
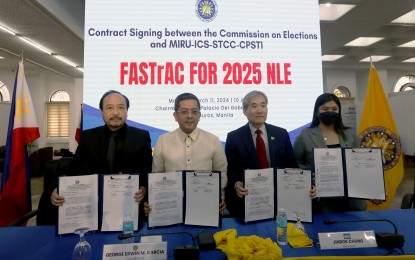
COMELEC and Miru Systems sign the ₱17.9 billion contract for the FASTrAC project.

On December 14, COMELEC conducted its first public bidding for a contract for the full automation system with the transparency audit count (FASTrAC) project amounting to a maximum of ₱18.827 billion. The South Korean firm Miru Systems was the sole bidder for the contract in the first round of bidding; its bid for the contract was rejected due to issues with its associated documents.

Later, on December 25, 2023, election watchdog Democracy Watch Philippines urged COMELEC to review Miru Systems' bid for the FASTrAC, expressing concern over electoral failures in the Democratic Republic of Congo and Iraq whose elections Miru Systems oversaw. The company denied such failures, asserting that the two countries had "continued to show trust" in the company.

The second round of bidding was conducted on January 8, 2024, in which six companies expressed interest in placing a bid. Of the six companies, only Miru Systems submitted a bid for the contract. In its second bid, the company was deemed eligible in its bid after fully complying with the required documents. COMELEC began its post-qualification evaluation of Miru Systems on January 23.

COMELEC unanimously awarded the contract for the lease of automated vote counting machines (VCMs) to Miru Systems on February 21. The contract, amounting to ₱17.9 billion, was finalized on March 11.

==== Reactions and aftermath ====
After the contract was signed, Cagayan de Oro 2nd district House representative Rufus Rodriguez criticized COMELEC for not obtaining the report lodged by Miru Systems' critics, deeming it a "big negligence". In her privilege speech, Senator Risa Hontiveros cast doubt in the lack of bidders for the FASTrAC contract and raised the possibility of "bid suppression" in the bidding process. One of Miru Systems' local partners, St. Timothy Construction Corporation, was subpoenaed by the Senate Committee on Electoral Reforms due to its ties to companies blacklisted by the Department of Public Works and Highways and a "sudden infusion of money" into the company in 2022.

On April 17, the Supreme Court of the Philippines ruled that the COMELEC committed a "grave abuse of discretion" in their disqualification of Smartmatic in bidding for the VCM contracts for the midterm election, but stated that its ruling does not nullify the bidding process that awarded Miru Systems the VCM contract, leaving the company as the provider of the VCMs for the election. In response, COMELEC filed a motion of reconsideration to the court.

More than one hundred thousand VCMs will be replaced in preparation for the election. Rizal 2nd district House representative Dino Tanjuatco called for the VCMs to be reused instead to allocate more funds to address the "high costs of goods". Smartmatic called for COMELEC to "utilize the warranty" of 93,977 precinct-based optical mark reader (OMR) machines and their accompanying election management system (EMS) that remain under the ownership of the commission.

On July 9, SAGIP House representative Rodante Marcoleta alleged that Miru Systems bribed COMELEC to win its contract for the FASTrAC, attributing his claims to offshore bank accounts worth ₱120 million in deposits. Garcia denied the allegations as "baseless", asserting that "he has no foreign bank account". Consequently, Garcia requested the National Bureau of Investigation (NBI) to probe the individuals responsible for Marcoleta's allegations.

On July 16, the Supreme Court en banc directed former Caloocan House representative Edgar Erice to file comment on the confidentiality and protective gag order motion filed by Miru Systems on the 2025 poll case. Earlier, Erice filed a certiorari case against the ₱18-billion contract awarded by the COMELEC to Miru Systems. Erice also filed a motion with the court to cite COMELEC Chairman George Garcia in contempt of court for violation of the sub judice rule alleging Garcia's prohibited remarks on the pending case.

In November 2024, COMELEC announced that Miru Systems had fully delivered all of the ordered 110,620 automated counting machines (ACMs), one month ahead of schedule.

==== Other contracts awarded ====
On April 8, the ₱1.4 billion contract to provide secure electronic transmission services (SETS) was awarded to a joint venture of iOne Resources Incorporated and Ardent Networks. On June 25, a joint venture of Sequent Tech and SMS Global Technologies won the contract to deliver an online voting tool for overseas voting.

=== Proposed amendments to the 1987 Constitution ===
On February 8, 2024, Constitution Day, President Bongbong Marcos affirmed his support for the efforts to amend the 1987 Constitution for "economic matters alone", pertaining to the Resolution of Both Houses No. 6 and 7, which largely aims to insert the phrase "unless otherwise provided by law" in select provisions to allow Congress to lift or relax present economic restrictions in the Constitution.

Marcos called for a constitutional plebiscite to be held in conjunction with the 2025 Philippine general election, noting the high costs of holding a separate vote. Garcia initially refused the notion of holding the plebiscite within the general election, citing a Supreme Court ruling prohibits the simultaneous conduct of a regular election and a constitutional plebiscite. However, Garcia would later change his stance and support conducting the two votes at once, announcing plans to use new VCMs and extend voting hours in anticipation of a possible plebiscite.

=== Schedule of barangay and Sangguniang Kabataan elections ===
On June 27, 2023, the Supreme Court of the Philippines ruled that Republic Act 11935, which postponed barangay and Sangguniang Kabataan elections scheduled in December 2022 to October 2023, was unconstitutional, but allowed the 2023 Philippine barangay and Sangguniang Kabataan Elections (BSKE) elections to push through in its schedule, citing practical and legal implications. In view of the decision, the Supreme Court also determined that the next BSKE elections will be held on December 1, 2025, while succeeding elections will be held every three years thereafter on the first Monday of the month.

On July 17, Garcia filed a motion for reconsideration to the Supreme Court, seeking to move the 2025 BSKE elections to 2026 to ensure that the terms of the barangay officials elected in 2023 are "definite and regular". On May 8, 2024, Representative Luis Raymund Villafuerte filed House Bill 10344, which aims to postpone the next BSKE elections to October 26, 2026, arguing that a shortened term for barangay officials "diminishes the obligations" that they hold.

=== Electoral reforms ===
On April 12, 2023, Garcia proposed a "hybrid election system", which entails the use of both automated and manual election systems for the 2025 election.

On its rules for this election, the commission substantially reduced the time period for substitutions due to withdrawals to within the filing of candidacies. Previously, the commission allowed for substitutions after the filing of candidacies was done. The practice of placeholder candidates initially filing candidacies to buy time for the actual candidate was extensively used in recent elections. After the filing of candidacies, substitutions can only be allowed by death or disqualification.

=== COMELEC membership ===
President Marcos appointed Norina Tangaro-Casingal, erstwhile director of the Commission on Elections law department as commissioner on February 10, 2025, replacing Socorro Inting, who had retired on February 2. Meanwhile, Ilocos Region election director Noli Tipo was also nominated as commissioner, replacing Marlon Casquejo. Chairman George Garcia defended the fact that now a majority of COMELEC members have been appointed by the Marcos administration, saying that it is constitutional, and that Congress can confirm the appointment or not.

== Issues ==
=== Chinese government interference ===
During a hearing of the Senate's special panel on maritime and admiralty zones in April 2025, the National Security Council said that there are indicators that the Chinese government is interfering in the upcoming 2025 national elections including discrediting candidates critical of it and supporting candidates who sympathize with China.

The National Intelligence Coordinating Agency (NICA) also claims that Chinese agents are "amplifying divisive political discourse" in the Philippines in coordination with local proxies. NICA alleged that the Chinese embassy in Manila have paid Makati-based firm InfinitUs Marketing Solutions in 2023 for a troll farm on Facebook and X to spread disinformation and promote Chinese state interests. In April 2025, the National Bureau of Investigation (NBI) arrested a Chinese national operating an IMSI-catcher near the offices of the Commission on Elections.

=== Security concerns ===
On October 21, 2023, Senator Francis Tolentino urged COMELEC to formulate policies regulating artificial intelligence (AI) in campaign materials to uphold the "principle of truthfulness". Later, on May 29, 2024, Garcia wrote to the COMELEC en banc seeking to prohibit the use of deepfakes and AI in campaigning for the 2025 election following the circulation of a deepfake of President Marcos appearing to have ordered an attack on China amid tensions in the South China Sea. Garcia's proposal was backed by Senators Bong Revilla and Sherwin Gatchalian, though the latter called for the commission to specify the policies on AI as soon as possible, remarking that "AI is evolving every day".

On January 9, 2025, COMELEC declared 38 cities and municipalities nationwide as election hotspots under its highest red-level category due to grave peace and order situation in relation to the election. Orange-level alerts were issued for 177 areas while the lowest level, yellow, was assigned to 188 locations. On March 19, COMELEC revised its list of election hotspots, with the number of "red" and "orange" locations reduced to 36 and 156 respectively. In April 2025, more than 400 soldiers were redeployed from the Zamboanga Peninsula to Lanao del Sur to enhance security in the province following incidents of violence. In total, the Philippine Army deployed 16,489 personnel nationwide to provide security during the election. In Lanao del Sur and Basilan, 888 police officers were deputized as members of local Special Election Boards. COMELEC also approved the holding of vote canvassing in Maguindanao del Sur to be held at the headquarters of the Philippine Army's Sixth Infantry Division in Datu Odin Sinsuat, Maguindanao del Norte. On polling day, 163,000 police officers were deployed to watch over polling stations, including 8,000 soldiers deployed in the Visayas. On May 14, a man who offered ₱5 million (US$101,522.84) on Facebook on anyone who would bomb COMELEC offices was arrested in Mandaue.

=== Premature campaigning ===
Although premature campaigning is prohibited by the Omnibus Election Code, there is effectively no legal prohibition against the practice due to the landmark Supreme Court decision Penera v. COMELEC in 2009, which ruled that persons who filed certificates of candidacy could only be considered official candidates when the campaign period begins, and thus can only be penalized for election offenses they committed afterwards.

In May 2024, the Philippine Center for Investigative Journalism (PCIJ) published research indicating at least 14 potential Senatorial candidates collectively spent a total of ₱3.5 million to boost their posts on Facebook. The PCIJ indicated that Senator Bong Go spent ₱1 million (US$20,304.57) alone on Facebook advertising, being followed by former Senator Bam Aquino and Secretary Benjamin Abalos Jr. As such spending is not subject to electoral policy limiting campaign expenditures, Garcia moved to begin the ban on premature campaigning in October 2024, when candidates are due to file their candidacies for public office.

=== Red-tagging ===
In February 2025, the COMELEC issued Resolution No. 11116, which made red-tagging and discrimination during election campaigns offenses punishable with imprisonment of one to six years and disqualification from public office. COMELEC Chair George Garcia said that the policy is based on the Supreme Court ruling that defined red-tagging as an act that threatens individuals.

In March 2025, Bayan Muna party-list nominee Neri Colmenares filed a complaint urging COMELEC to investigate allegations of red-tagging and vilification constituting "massive and widespread black propaganda" and the destruction of campaign materials.

The International Coalition for Human Rights in the Philippines stated that red-tagging was the most common election violation as of April 30, 2025, making up 78.7% of the election violations it had recorded. "This level of systematic red-tagging is not only a violation of human rights, it's a coordinated effort to intimidate and discredit democratic actors," the group said in a statement.

=== Election violence ===
The Philippine National Police officially recorded 100 election-related incidents since January 2025, with 20 deaths occurring as a result. The highest number of incidents were recorded in the Cordillera Administrative Region, with 11 cases, and Bangsamoro, with eight cases. As of May 11, 2025, COMELEC has also recorded more than 600 cases of vote-buying.

On October 8, 2024, clashes between supporters of rival politicians on the last day of candidate registration in Shariff Aguak, Maguindanao del Sur left a barangay watchman dead and six people injured, one of them critically. That same day, an attempt was made to steal a certificate of candidacy at a COMELEC office in Himamaylan, Negros Occidental.

On October 19, a candidate for councilor in Datu Hoffer Ampatuan, Maguindanao del Sur, was shot dead in an ambush by unidentified suspects that also injured his wife. On November 17, a candidate for vice mayor was shot dead in Tantangan, South Cotabato. On November 23, the assistant COMELEC officer for Isulan, Sultan Kudarat, was shot dead, followed on November 26 by the acting COMELEC officer for Nunungan, Lanao del Norte. On December 7, Ponciano Onia Jr., a reelectionist councilor of Umingan, Pangasinan, and concurrent national president of Abono Partylist, was shot dead in an ambush. On December 19, a reelectionist councilor was shot dead in Piñan, Zamboanga del Norte. On December 21, the provincial election supervisor of Sulu survived an ambush that killed his brother in Zamboanga City. On December 25, a petitioner who complained about the presence of flying voters was shot dead in Pualas, Lanao del Sur. A subsequent judicial investigation found that 1,750 names on the town's voter rolls were fraudulent.

On January 18, 2025, a candidate for councilor in Northern Kabuntalan, Maguindanao del Norte, was shot dead in Midsayap, Cotabato. On January 25, a reelectionist municipal councilor of Caoayan, Ilocos Sur was shot dead in Vigan. On February 4, Anwar Saluwang, the mayor of Nabalawag in the Special Geographic Area of Cotabato, was arrested in Davao City for violating the nationwide gun ban imposed as part of the election. On February 11, a vice mayoral candidate of Buluan, Maguindanao del Sur, survived an ambush on his vehicle. That same day, three people were arrested for trying to extort ₱90 million (US$1.83 million) from two municipal candidates in Enrile, Cagayan by claiming to be COMELEC-connected IT specialists who could rig the election results in their favor. On February 24, Omar Samama, the reelectionist vice mayor of Datu Piang, Maguindanao del Sur, was shot and injured while speaking at an event. That same day, the convoy of a mayoral candidate of Pidigan, Abra, was ambushed in Pilar, killing two people, including a barangay chairman. On March 26, the COMELEC officer for Datu Odin Sinsuat, Maguindanao del Norte, was killed in an ambush along with her husband, prompting COMELEC to place the municipality under its control on April 4.

On April 7, a candidate for municipal councilor in Lagangilang, Abra, shot dead a barangay chairman during a dispute with a rival candidate before being shot dead himself by an unidentified individual. On April 10, Kerwin Espinosa, a mayoral candidate of Albuera, Leyte, who had previously admitted to being a drug trafficker, was shot and injured along with his running-mate for vice mayor and a bystander while at a campaign rally. The next day, suspected explosive materials were discovered abandoned at his campaign headquarters. On April 13, Datu Omar Baba, a reelectionist candidate for the provincial board of Maguindanao del Sur was injured along with his driver in an ambush in Datu Anggal Midtimbang. On April 15, the town of Buluan in Maguindanao del Sur, was placed under COMELEC control due to continuing violence, including an incident where grenades were thrown at the municipal hall.

On April 21, a shootout between the convoys of a mayoral candidate in Tayum, Abra, and a barangay kagawad left one person dead and another injured. On April 23, Joel Ruma, the reelectionist mayor of Rizal, Cagayan, was shot dead by a suspected sniper while campaigning, with three people injured in the same incident. On April 26, a candidate for councilor in San Pablo, Isabela, was shot and injured along with two companions in an ambush. On April 28, Leninsky Bacud, a nominee of Ang Bumbero ng Pilipinas party-list, was shot dead in an ambush in Sampaloc, Manila. On April 30, a campaign coordinator of a municipal candidate was killed in a shooting in Badian, Cebu.

On May 4, a grenade attack was carried out on the residence in Buluan of Maguindanao del Sur vice gubernatorial candidate Hisham Nando, who was campaigning elsewhere at the time. On May 5, three people were arrested for impersonating COMELEC personnel and attempting to gain access to voting machines at a school in Santa Cruz, Laguna. On May 7, the testing of voting machines at a polling station in Alicia, Zamboanga Sibugay was interrupted following a shootout between soldiers and unidentified gunmen that left one person dead. On May 8, police accused demonstrators of detonating an improvised smoke grenade during a protest against vote-buying at a government office in Calamba, Laguna. On May 10, a crowd crush at a reported payout for poll watchers in Zamboanga City left two people dead. A candidate for councilor and a student died in a clash in Pandag, Maguindanao del Sur. On May 11, four people were killed in clashes between supporters of rival mayoral candidates in Hadji Mohammad Ajul, Basilan, while four others were injured in a shootout between supporters of rival political parties in Cotabato City. Eleven people were arrested for trying to smuggle P441 million to the Mactan–Cebu International Airport for vote buying.

On polling day, clashes broke out in Marawi between supporters of rival candidates, while a poll watcher poured water on a vote-counting machine. In Silay, Negros Occidental, two supporters of reelectionist mayor Joedith Gallego were killed while five others were injured in a shooting near a campaign area. Two people were injured after gunmen opened fire near a polling station in Bangued, Abra. One person was killed in clashes between rival political groups in Dinas, Zamboanga del Sur. Voting was delayed in Datu Odin Sinsuat after voters protested against the local election boards and barricaded the municipal hall. Two people, a councilor candidate and his sibling, an incumbent barangay chairman were killed in Bayang, Lanao del Sur. Three supporters of a mayoral candidate in Hadji Muhtamad, Basilan, were killed in a shootout with police. Two poll watchers were removed in Abra after a video went viral of them shading ballots for senior citizens. More than 50 people queuing to vote were stung by bees from a hive that fell from a tree at a polling station in Bacolod.

On May 28, a newly elected councilor of Datu Piang, Maguindanao del Sur was shot dead near his residence.

=== Complaints against candidates ===
On February 28, COMELEC filed cybercrime charges against vice-mayoral candidate Jeryll Harold Respicio in Reina Mercedes, Isabela, after he posted a video on social media appearing to demonstrate a method on how to tamper with the election results. After he won the election, Comelec suspended his proclamation until June 2. Several candidates were also summoned for remarks deemed inappropriate, including some considered misogynistic or prejudiced against ethnic groups. Among them were congressional candidate Ian Sia (Pasig), Batangas gubernatorial candidate Jay Ilagan, reelectionist Misamis Oriental governor Peter Unabia and House representative from Davao de Oro Ruwel Peter Gonzaga. Sia was eventually disqualified by the COMELEC Second Division on May 7 over his remarks.

=== Campaign finance ===
In September 2025, Chiz Escudero was ousted as Senate president after a contractor for government flood-control projects testified that Escudero received a election campaign contribution of ₱30 million from a top contractor for government flood-control projects.

Among the candidates for senator, the top spender during the campaign period was Camille Villar, who spent ₱179.6 million for her campaign. The other top spenders were Lito Lapid, who spent ₱163.58, and Pia Cayetano, who spent ₱62 million.

=== Vote buying ===
In 2025, the European Union Election Observation Mission described vote buying in the Philippines as "endemic" and "well-entrenched." As of April 28, 2025, COMELEC has summoned 213 candidates on various complaints, mostly regarding vote-buying and abuse of state resources.

The commission later summoned 74 individuals for alleged vote-buying, including senatorial candidate Camille Villar, Marikina mayoral candidate Stella Quimbo and husband congressional candidate Miro Quimbo, Manila mayoral candidates Honey Lacuna, Isko Moreno and Sam Verzosa, Laguna gubernatorial candidate Danilo Fernandez, Caloocan mayoral candidate Along Malapitan, congressional candidates Esmael Mangudadatu (Maguindanao del Sur), Maria Fe Abunda (Eastern Samar), and several others, including non-candidates and party-lists.

=== Voting issues ===
On May 12, volunteers from the Parish Pastoral Council for Responsible Voting–Archdiocesan Citizen Engagement Committee were denied entry to vote in Davao City. Senior citizens were frustrated at the waiting times to vote, some waiting up to an hour. NAMFREL said that most of the issues were related to the voting machines. According to NAMFREL, machines flagged properly filled ballots as invalid, ballots were rejected due to ink smudges, blocked screens prevented the machines from reading ballots, and machines rejected ballots because of folds. NAMFREL also flagged violations of ballot secrecy, like the absence of secrecy folders, voters discussing their votes with others, and ballots being visible to others.

In social media, there were multiple reports of overvoting, with some sources stating that the ink bled to the other side. Because some machines experienced overheating, 311 of the 16,000 voting machines had to be replaced. Some voter receipts did not match the candidates that people voted for, causing COMELEC Chairman George Garcia to say that there is a high possibility that people forgot who they were voting for. According to election watchdogs Kontra Daya and Vote Report PH, there were 1,362 voter reports about glitches. 693 of the reports were about machine errors. The Department of Education said that 130 out of the 160 election-related complaints were about overvoting cases. Senatorial candidate Jocelyn Andamo was unable to vote for a party-list group because of a machine error. Actor Khalil Ramos's party-list vote was disqualified because the machine thought he overvoted.

=== Disinformation and fake news ===
Fake news has the power to influence Philippine elections. In 2025, the Philippines Commission on Elections (COMELEC) stated that misinformation and disinformation can "make or break" the midterm election.

In May 2025, former Congress representative and Bayan Muna party-list nominee Neri Colmenares filed before the COMELEC a complaint against disinformation that targeted Bayan Muna during the 2025 election campaign period. During the election campaigns, social media posts red-tagged Bayan Muna and falsely claimed that the COMELEC had disqualified Bayan Muna in the party-list race.

== Electoral system ==
In the Philippines, congressional and local elections, excluding the regional and barangay levels, have been synchronized to be held on the second Monday of May every three years, starting in 1992. Presidents and vice presidents have six-year terms, so they are only elected in even-numbered years (1992, 1998, and so on). Elections where the presidency is not on the ballot are called midterm elections, and occur in odd-numbered years (1995, 2001, and so on).

Every seat up for election is voted on separately. Since 2010, general elections have been automated, with voters shading an oval next to their chosen candidate. For executive positions, elections are decided via the first-past-the-post voting (FPTP) system, where the voter has one choice. Elections to the Senate and local legislatures are held via multiple non-transferable vote, where the voter has x number of choices depending on the number of seats up for election (12 in the case of the Senate), and the x candidates with the highest number of votes win. For House elections, each voter has two votes, one via FPTP, and the other via a modified party-list proportional representation system.

Elections are organized, run, and adjudicated by the COMELEC, an independent governmental body. Appeals are allowed under certain conditions to the Regional Trial Courts, the Congress, or the Supreme Court, sitting as the House of Representatives Electoral Tribunal, the Senate Electoral Tribunal, or the Presidential Electoral Tribunal depending on the election being appealed.

=== Calendar ===
On May 29, 2024, COMELEC released the schedule for activities on the conduct of the 2025 elections.

Activity	Start	End
Voter registration	February 12, 2024	September 30, 2024
Overseas voter registration	December 9, 2022	September 30, 2024
Holding of political conventions	September 1, 2024	September 28, 2024
Filing of certificates of candidacies	October 1, 2024	October 8, 2024
Deadline in substituting a candidate for it to appear on the ballot	October 8, 2024	
Election period: Prohibition on carrying and usage of firearms; Prohibition on suspending from office of local elective officials; Suspension of recruitment, processing of, and ultimate appointment of government employees/staff, whether de jure (plantilla) or de facto ("Contract of Service" (CoS), "job order" (JO) )	January 12, 2025	June 11, 2025
Campaign period for nationally elected positions	February 11, 2025	May 10, 2025
Campaign period for locally elected positions	March 28, 2025	May 10, 2025
Voting for overseas voters	April 13, 2025	May 12, 2025
Election silence (Maundy Thursday and Good Friday)	April 17, 2025	April 18, 2025
Voting for local absentee voters in the Philippines	April 28, 2025	April 30, 2025
Liquor ban	May 11, 2025	May 12, 2025
Election day; voting for non-absentee voters in the Philippines	May 12, 2025	
Term of office of winning candidates for local officials and the House of Representatives	June 30, 2025	June 30, 2028
Term of office of winning candidates for senators	June 30, 2025	June 30, 2031

== Parties and coalitions ==
Political parties in the Philippines forge political coalitions and alliances in the run-up to the general election as part of the country's multi-party system. The coalitions and alliances listed below are ordered alphabetically and reflect political agreements and endorsements as of May 2025. These coalitions usually present a single list in senatorial elections, then contest House of Representatives and local elections individually.

Parties and coalitions participating in the 2025 Philippine general election
Coalition	Parties endorsed	Current seats (Note: Total seats held by the endorsed parties)	
Coalition	Parties endorsed	House	Senate
Alyansa para sa Bagong Pilipinas; Formed May 8, 2024	▌ Partido Federal ng Pilipinas (PFP); ▌ Lakas–CMD; ▌ Nacionalista Party (NP); ▌ National Unity Party (NUP); ▌ Nationalist People's Coalition (NPC)	230 / 316	12 / 24
DuterTen; Announced April 19, 2024	▌ Partido Demokratiko Pilipino (PDP); ▌ Partido para sa Demokratikong Reporma (PDR); ▌ Pederalismo ng Dugong Dakilang Samahan (PDDS)	1 / 316	3 / 24
KiBam; Announced February 22, 2024	▌ Akbayan; ▌ Katipunan ng Nagkakaisang Pilipino (KANP); ▌ Liberal Party (LP)	6 / 316	2 / 24
Makabayan; Announced June 26, 2024	▌ ACT Teachers; ▌ GABRIELA; ▌ Kabataan; ▌ Bayan Muna	3 / 316	0 / 24

For 2025, the Commission on Elections identified the following as major parties:

- Dominant majority party: Lakas–CMD
- Dominant minority party: Nacionalista Party
- Major political parties:
  - PDP–Laban
  - Akbayan
  - Liberal Party
  - Nationalist People's Coalition
  - National Unity Party
  - Partido para sa Demokratikong Reporma
  - United Nationalist Alliance
  - Partido Federal ng Pilipinas

== Campaign ==
Campaigning for candidates for senator and party-list representative began on February 11, 2025. For locally elected positions, including representatives from congressional districts, campaigning on March 28, 2025. Campaigning ended on May 10, 2025, with election eve having election silence, with campaigning being banned.

== Observers ==
On May 8, 2025, COMELEC rejected a request by the European Union Election Observation Mission to be allowed entry in polling places on voting day, citing domestic laws.

== Results ==
COMELEC noted a total of 18,320 positions up for election in 2025. The election will determine the composition of the 20th Congress of the Philippines, set to take office on June 30, 2025, for a term ending on June 30, 2028.

The commission announced a voter turnout of 81.65% or 55,874,700 out of the 68,431,965 voters, the highest in the history of mid-term elections in the Philippines. COMELEC chairman George Garcia remarked that this was an increase from around 75% turnout in the 2019 elections.

On election night, the Parish Pastoral Council for Responsible Voting (PPCRV) had not received transmitted election returns, although the COMELEC had received theirs. At 10:21 p.m., the PPCRV received data and that the first results were shared to the public. Later that night, the COMELEC had already received 98% of election returns, but the PPCRV had only received 79.9%. Initial data received by the PPCRV showed that their tally and the data did not match. By around 1:00 a.m. early morning after election day, PPCRV director William Yu said that the COMELEC informed them that "they will be revising the dump to remove the duplicates". Later in the day, the PPCRV were able to gain access to the rest of the data. The COMELEC denied any irregularity, faulting the media when receiving the data, as their software did not filter duplicate entries, as explained by Garcia.

COMELEC, sitting as the National Board of Canvassers, first convened on May 13, a day after the election, to canvass the local absentee voting results. The commission canvassed 159 certificates of canvass by Wednesday after the election, in what was said to be record speed, leaving just sixteen certificates. They finished canvassing the votes on May 15, with the commission announcing a voter turnout of 57,350,958 or 82% of the electorate.

=== Senate ===
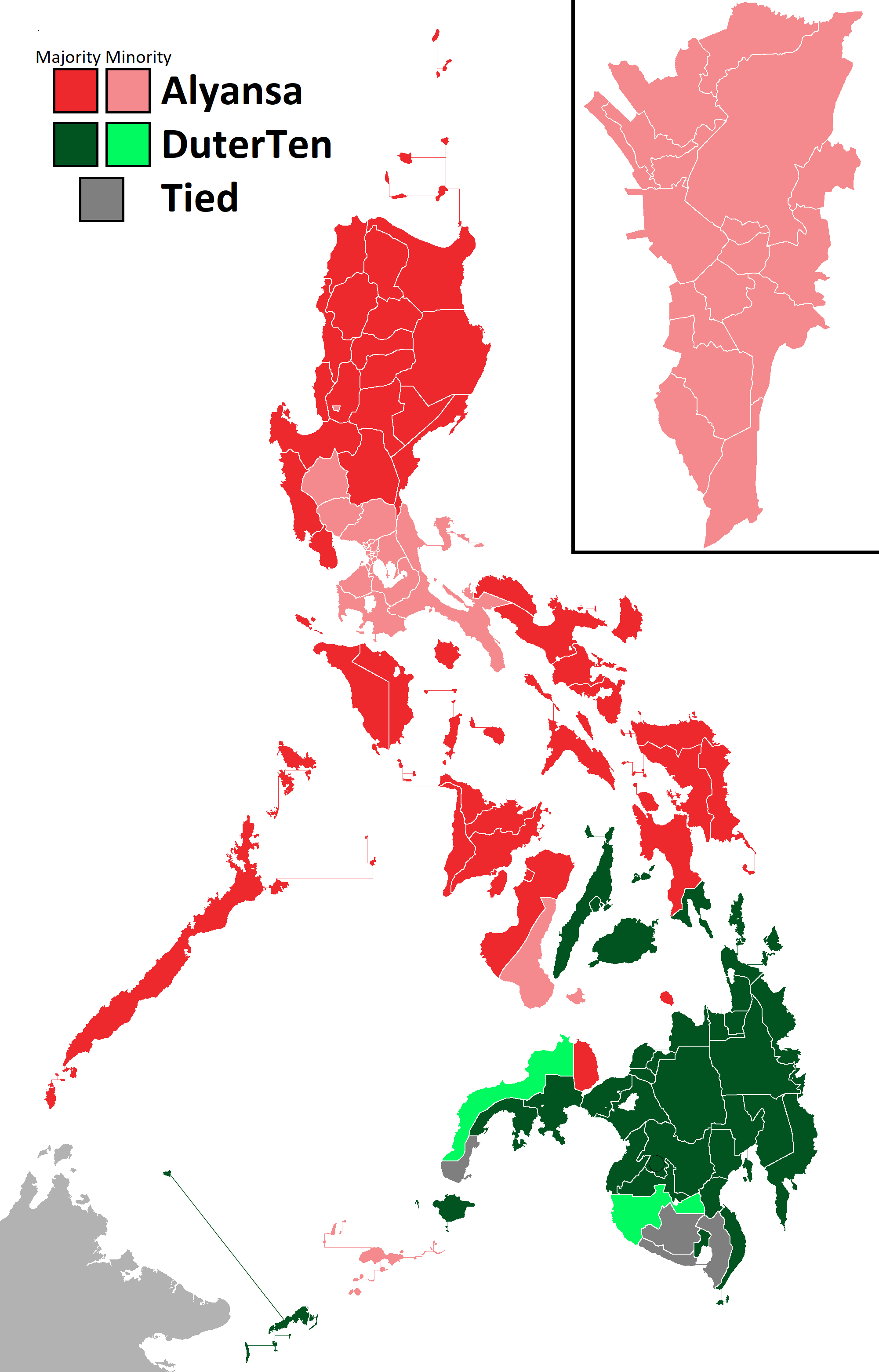
Results per province and city, showing the number of candidates per slate that made it to the top 12 in that province or city

In the Senate, 12 of 24 seats were up for election. The seats up for election were previously contested in 2019 and will be contested again in 2031. There were 66 candidates in the election.

Initial results saw the Alyansa para sa Bagong Pilipinas on pace on winning six seats, DuterTen with five, including two guest candidates (one guest a candidate of Alyansa), and both KiBam candidates winning. Bong Go emerged as the top candidate in the senatorial election, winning 27 million votes. The winning candidates were proclaimed on May 17.

Candidate	Party or alliance		Votes	%
Bong Go	DuterTen	PDP–Laban	27,121,073	47.29
Bam Aquino	KiBam	Katipunan ng Nagkakaisang Pilipino	20,971,899	36.57
Ronald dela Rosa	DuterTen	PDP–Laban	20,773,946	36.22
Erwin Tulfo	Alyansa para sa Bagong Pilipinas	Lakas–CMD	17,118,881	29.85
Kiko Pangilinan	KiBam	Liberal Party	15,343,229	26.75
Rodante Marcoleta	DuterTen	Independent	15,250,723	26.59
Panfilo Lacson	Alyansa para sa Bagong Pilipinas	Independent	15,106,111	26.34
Tito Sotto	Alyansa para sa Bagong Pilipinas	Nationalist People's Coalition	14,832,996	25.86
Pia Cayetano	Alyansa para sa Bagong Pilipinas	Nacionalista Party	14,573,430	25.41
Camille Villar	Alyansa para sa Bagong Pilipinas (Note: Guest candidate of DuterTen)	Nacionalista Party	13,651,274	23.80
Lito Lapid	Alyansa para sa Bagong Pilipinas	Nationalist People's Coalition	13,394,102	23.35
Imee Marcos	Nacionalista Party		13,339,227	23.26
Ben Tulfo	Independent		12,090,090	21.08
Bong Revilla	Alyansa para sa Bagong Pilipinas	Lakas–CMD	12,027,845	20.97
Abigail Binay	Alyansa para sa Bagong Pilipinas	Nationalist People's Coalition	11,808,645	20.59
Benhur Abalos	Alyansa para sa Bagong Pilipinas	Partido Federal ng Pilipinas	11,580,520	20.19
Jimmy Bondoc	DuterTen	PDP–Laban	10,615,598	18.51
Manny Pacquiao	Alyansa para sa Bagong Pilipinas	Partido Federal ng Pilipinas	10,397,133	18.13
Phillip Salvador	DuterTen	PDP–Laban	10,241,491	17.86
Bonifacio Bosita	Riding-in-Tandem Team	Independent	9,805,903	17.10
Heidi Mendoza	Independent		8,759,732	15.27
Willie Revillame	Independent		8,568,924	14.94
Vic Rodriguez	DuterTen	Independent	8,450,668	14.74
Raul Lambino	DuterTen	PDP–Laban	8,383,593	14.62
Francis Tolentino	Alyansa para sa Bagong Pilipinas	Partido Federal ng Pilipinas	7,702,550	13.43
Jayvee Hinlo	DuterTen	PDP–Laban	7,471,704	13.03
Willie Ong (Note: Withdrew but remained on the ballot)	Aksyon Demokratiko		7,371,944	12.85
Gregorio Honasan	Reform PH Party		6,700,772	11.68
Luke Espiritu	Partido Lakas ng Masa		6,481,413	11.30
Richard Mata	DuterTen	Independent	5,789,181	10.09
Apollo Quiboloy	DuterTen	Independent	5,719,041	9.97
Teodoro Casiño	Makabayan		4,648,271	8.10
Arlene Brosas	Makabayan		4,343,773	7.57
Leody de Guzman	Partido Lakas ng Masa		4,136,899	7.21
Danilo Ramos	Makabayan		4,091,257	7.13
Ariel Querubin	Riding-in-Tandem Team	Nacionalista Party	3,950,051	6.89
Liza Maza	Makabayan		3,927,784	6.85
Sonny Matula	Workers' and Peasants' Party		3,865,792	6.74
Ronnel Arambulo	Makabayan		3,846,216	6.71
France Castro	Makabayan		3,670,972	6.40
Angelo de Alban	Independent		2,556,983	4.46
Roberto Ballon	Independent		2,389,847	4.17
Norman Marquez	Independent		1,150,095	2.01
Eric Martinez	Independent		1,032,201	1.80
Norberto Gonzales	Partido Demokratiko Sosyalista ng Pilipinas		990,091	1.73
Jocelyn Andamo	Makabayan		829,084	1.45
Allen Capuyan	Partido Pilipino sa Pagbabago		818,437	1.43
Ernesto Arellano	Katipunan ng Kamalayang Kayumanggi		801,677	1.40
Jerome Adonis	Makabayan		779,868	1.36
Mimi Doringo	Makabayan		744,506	1.30
Arnel Escobal	Partido Maharlika		731,453	1.28
Jose Montemayor Jr.	Independent		671,818	1.17
Wilson Amad	Independent		618,943	1.08
Mar Valbuena	Independent		611,432	1.07
David D'Angelo	Bunyog Party		607,642	1.06
Wilbert T. Lee	Aksyon Demokratiko		587,098	1.02
Marc Gamboa	Aksyon Demokratiko	Independent	571,637	1.00
Amirah Lidasan	Makabayan		564,948	0.99
Mody Floranda	Makabayan		554,385	0.97
Nur-Ana Sahidulla	Independent		476,855	0.83
Michael Tapado	Partido Maharlika		460,662	0.80
Relly Jose Jr.	Kilusang Bagong Lipunan		458,383	0.80
Jose Olivar	Independent		448,794	0.78
Subair Mustapha	Workers' and Peasants' Party		414,027	0.72
Roy Cabonegro	Democratic Party of the Philippines		383,534	0.67
Leandro Verceles Jr.	Independent		310,562	0.54
Total			428,489,615	100.00
Total votes			57,350,958	–
Registered voters/turnout			69,673,655	82.31
Source: COMELEC

=== House of Representatives ===
Results by congressional district; party-list seats denoted by boxes to the right.

In the House of Representatives, all 317 seats were up for election, including 254 seats representing geographic congressional districts and 63 seats are apportioned among party-lists. There were 615 candidates in the congressional district elections, and 155 parties contesting the party-list election.

==== Elections on congressional districts ====
In elections at congressional districts, Lakas–CMD of Speaker Martin Romualdez emerged as the largest party, winning 104 seats. Jude Acidre later said that 100 of the 115 members who had voted to impeach Sara Duterte successfully defended their seats.

Party	Votes	%	+/–	Seats	+/–
Lakas–CMD	16,596,698	32.87	+23.70	103	+77
National Unity Party	6,080,987	12.05	+0.13	32	−1
Nationalist People's Coalition	5,974,201	11.83	−0.60	31	−4
Partido Federal ng Pilipinas	5,286,538	10.47	+9.53	27	+25
Nacionalista Party	4,724,803	9.36	−4.38	22	−14
Liberal Party	1,555,941	3.08	−0.70	6	−4
Aksyon Demokratiko	1,341,540	2.66	+0.72	2	+2
PDP–Laban	666,067	1.32	−21.45	2	−64
Hugpong sa Tawong Lungsod	542,710	1.07	+0.93	3	+3
Laban ng Demokratikong Pilipino	314,981	0.62	−0.16	2	+1
People's Reform Party	292,665	0.58	−1.38	1	−2
Pwersa ng Masang Pilipino	269,949	0.53	+0.52	2	+2
United Bangsamoro Justice Party	236,857	0.47	−0.14	0	0
Unang Sigaw	183,912	0.36	−0.29	0	0
Makatizens United Party	150,189	0.30	New	2	New
Sama Sama Tarlac	143,868	0.28	New	0	0
United Nationalist Alliance	142,655	0.28	+0.14	1	0
Katipunan ng Nagkakaisang Pilipino	134,137	0.27	+0.26	0	0
National Unity Party/United Negros Alliance	130,023	0.26	−0.27	1	−1
Centrist Democratic Party of the Philippines	127,646	0.25	−0.02	1	0
Partido Navoteño	116,622	0.23	+0.06	1	0
One Capiz	109,249	0.22	New	0	0
Reform PH Party	107,966	0.21	New	0	0
Lakas–CMD/One Cebu	104,768	0.21	New	1	New
Adelante Zamboanga Party	100,035	0.20	+0.05	1	0
Padajon Surigao	99,856	0.20	New	0	0
Galing at Serbisyo para sa Mindoreño	91,073	0.18	New	0	0
Filipino Rights Protection Advocates of Manila Movement	87,183	0.17	New	0	0
Nationalist People's Coalition/One Cebu	74,936	0.15	New	1	New
Asenso Manileño	70,780	0.14	New	1	0
Akay National Political Party	68,524	0.14	New	0	0
Workers' and Peasants' Party	50,618	0.10	+0.00	0	0
Kusog Bicolandia	33,789	0.07	New	0	0
Partido Lakas ng Masa	28,746	0.06	+0.05	0	0
Asenso Abrenio	23,308	0.05	New	0	0
Makabayan	22,698	0.04	New	0	0
Partido Demokratiko Sosyalista ng Pilipinas	14,343	0.03	−0.13	0	0
Partido para sa Demokratikong Reporma	12,672	0.03	−0.96	0	0
Independent	4,371,611	8.66	+4.23	11	+5
Party-list seats				64	+1
Total	50,485,144	100.00	–	318	+1
Valid votes	50,485,144	88.46	+1.48		
Invalid/blank votes	6,585,150	11.54	−1.48		
Total votes	57,070,294	100.00	–		
Registered voters/turnout	68,431,965	83.40	−0.70		
Source: COMELEC (results per district, registered voters)

==== Party-list election ====
After the canvassing of votes was completed, Akbayan emerged as the party with the most votes in the party-list election, and is poised to win three seats. The winning party lists were proclaimed on May 19 with the exception of Duterte Youth and Bagong Henerasyon, whose proclamations were suspended as they were facing petitions for disqualifications at the time. Bagong Henerasyon was eventually proclaimed on June 6 after COMELEC dismissed the disqualification case against it due to procedural errors by the petitioner.

Party	Votes	%	Seats	+/–
Akbayan	2,779,621	7.02	3	+2
Tingog Party List	1,822,708	4.60	3	+1
4Ps Partylist	1,469,571	3.71	2	0
ACT-CIS Partylist	1,239,930	3.13	2	−1
Ako Bicol	1,073,119	2.71	2	0
Uswag Ilonggo	777,754	1.96	1	0
Solid North Party	765,322	1.93	1	New
Trabaho Partylist	709,283	1.79	1	+1
Citizens' Battle Against Corruption	593,911	1.50	1	0
Malasakit at Bayanihan	580,100	1.46	1	0
Senior Citizens Partylist	577,753	1.46	1	0
Puwersa ng Pilipinong Pandagat	575,762	1.45	1	New
Mamamayang Liberal	547,949	1.38	1	New
FPJ Panday Bayanihan	538,003	1.36	1	New
United Senior Citizens Partylist	533,913	1.35	1	0
4K Partylist	521,592	1.32	1	New
LPG Marketers Association	517,833	1.31	1	0
Coop-NATCCO	509,913	1.29	1	0
Ako Bisaya	477,796	1.21	1	0
Construction Workers Solidarity	477,517	1.21	1	0
Pinoy Workers Partylist	475,985	1.20	1	New
AGAP Partylist	469,412	1.19	1	0
Asenso Pinoy	423,133	1.07	1	+1
Agimat Partylist	420,813	1.06	1	0
TGP Partylist	407,922	1.03	1	0
SAGIP Partylist	405,297	1.02	1	−1
Alona Partylist	393,684	0.99	1	0
1-Rider Partylist	385,700	0.97	1	−1
Kamanggagawa	382,657	0.97	1	New
Galing sa Puso Party	381,880	0.96	1	0
Kamalayan	381,437	0.96	1	+1
Bicol Saro	366,177	0.92	1	0
Kusug Tausug	365,916	0.92	1	0
Alliance of Concerned Teachers	353,631	0.89	1	0
One Coop	334,098	0.84	1	+1
KM Ngayon Na	324,405	0.82	1	+1
Abante Mindanao	320,349	0.81	1	New
Bagong Henerasyon	319,803	0.81	1	0
Trade Union Congress Party	314,814	0.79	1	0
Kabataan	312,344	0.79	1	0
APEC Partylist	310,427	0.78	1	0
Magbubukid	310,289	0.78	1	New
1Tahanan	309,761	0.78	1	+1
Ako Ilocano Ako	301,406	0.76	1	0
Manila Teachers Party-List	301,291	0.76	1	0
Nanay Partylist	293,430	0.74	1	New
Kapuso PM	293,149	0.74	1	New
SSS-GSIS Pensyonado	290,359	0.73	1	New
DUMPER Partylist	279,532	0.71	1	0
Abang Lingkod	274,735	0.69	1	0
Pusong Pinoy	266,623	0.67	1	0
Swerte	261,379	0.66	1	New
Philreca Party-List	261,045	0.66	1	0
Gabriela Women's Party (Note: Proclaimed as winner on September 17, 2025 by virtue of the COMELEC declaring a 64th seat being up)	256,811	0.65	1	0
Abono Partylist (Note: Proclaimed as winner on October 2, 2025 by virtue of Duterte Youth's disqualification)	254,474	0.64	1	0
Ang Probinsyano Party-list	250,886	0.63	1	0
Murang Kuryente Partylist	247,754	0.63	1	New
OFW Partylist	246,609	0.62	0	−1
Apat-Dapat	245,060	0.62	0	0
Tupad	243,152	0.61	0	0
Kalinga Partylist	235,186	0.59	0	0
1-Pacman Party List	233,096	0.59	0	−1
ANGAT Partylist	229,707	0.58	0	−1
Magsasaka Partylist	225,371	0.57	0	−1
P3PWD	214,605	0.54	0	−1
Barangay Health Wellness Partylist	203,719	0.51	0	−1
Democratic Independent Workers Association	195,829	0.49	0	0
Epanaw Sambayanan	188,505	0.48	0	0
Probinsyano Ako	185,606	0.47	0	−1
Toda Aksyon	183,111	0.46	0	0
Pinuno Partylist	181,066	0.46	0	−1
Serbisyo sa Bayan Party	175,520	0.44	0	0
Abante Pangasinan-Ilokano Party	170,795	0.43	0	−1
AGRI Partylist	168,032	0.42	0	−1
Asap Na	164,030	0.41	0	0
Bayan Muna	162,894	0.41	0	0
Eduaksyon	161,517	0.41	0	0
Akay ni Sol	159,748	0.40	0	0
Ahon Mahirap	157,991	0.40	0	0
1Munti Partylist	157,665	0.40	0	0
H.E.L.P. Pilipinas	157,308	0.40	0	0
A Teacher Partylist	157,116	0.40	0	0
Babae Ako	157,041	0.40	0	0
Anakalusugan	154,121	0.39	0	−1
Pilipinas Babangon Muli	154,025	0.39	0	0
Batang Quiapo Partylist	153,637	0.39	0	0
Lunas	151,494	0.38	0	0
Kabalikat ng Mamamayan	141,847	0.36	0	−1
WIFI	141,041	0.36	0	0
Aangat Tayo	140,597	0.35	0	0
Laang Kawal	136,484	0.34	0	0
Ako Padayon	134,292	0.34	0	0
Solo Parents	131,659	0.33	0	0
Pamilya Ko	124,228	0.31	0	0
Pamilyang Magsasaka	117,440	0.30	0	0
ANGKASANGGA	115,720	0.29	0	0
Kasambahay	111,269	0.28	0	0
Bangon Bagong Minero	111,174	0.28	0	0
Pamilya Muna	108,483	0.27	0	0
Kababaihan	107,848	0.27	0	0
AA-Kasosyo Party	107,262	0.27	0	0
Tulungan Tayo	106,504	0.27	0	0
Health Workers	105,512	0.27	0	0
1Agila	104,868	0.26	0	0
Boses Party-List	102,588	0.26	0	0
Buhay Party-List	99,365	0.25	0	0
Ipatupad For Workers	96,735	0.24	0	0
Gilas	96,646	0.24	0	0
Bunyog Party	93,825	0.24	0	0
Vendors Partylist	88,845	0.22	0	0
Bayaning Tsuper	84,204	0.21	0	0
Bisaya Gyud Party-List	79,915	0.20	0	0
Magdalo Party-List	78,984	0.20	0	0
Maharlikang Pilipino Party	78,700	0.20	0	0
Arangkada Pilipino	75,493	0.19	0	0
Bagong Maunlad na Pilipinas	70,595	0.18	0	0
Damayang Filipino	68,480	0.17	0	0
Partido sa Bagong Pilipino	68,085	0.17	0	0
Heal PH	67,085	0.17	0	0
Ang Tinig ng Seniors	66,553	0.17	0	0
Ako OFW	60,230	0.15	0	0
Aksyon Dapat	58,916	0.15	0	0
Aktibong Kaagapay	55,829	0.14	0	0
UGB Partylist	53,633	0.14	0	0
Ang Komadrona	53,017	0.13	0	0
United Frontliners	52,338	0.13	0	0
Gabay	52,109	0.13	0	0
Tictok	51,354	0.13	0	0
Ako Tanod	49,553	0.13	0	0
Barangay Natin	49,364	0.12	0	0
Abante Bisdak	49,114	0.12	0	0
Turismo	47,645	0.12	0	0
Ang Bumbero ng Pilipinas	47,027	0.12	0	0
BFF	45,816	0.12	0	0
Pinoy Ako	44,419	0.11	0	0
Patrol Partylist	41,570	0.10	0	−1
Tutok To Win Party-List	41,036	0.10	0	−1
Lingap	38,564	0.10	0	0
Maagap	35,871	0.09	0	0
PBA Partylist	35,078	0.09	0	−1
Ilocano Defenders	32,028	0.08	0	0
Pamana	31,526	0.08	0	0
Kaunlad Pinoy	30,898	0.08	0	0
Juan Pinoy	27,523	0.07	0	0
Rebolusyonaryong Alyansang Makabansa	26,771	0.07	0	0
Arise	26,565	0.07	0	0
Click Party	25,914	0.07	0	0
MPBL Partylist	23,189	0.06	0	0
PROMDI	23,144	0.06	0	0
Bida Katagumpay	20,885	0.05	0	0
Hugpong Federal	19,028	0.05	0	0
Arte	14,169	0.04	0	0
Peoples Champ Guardians Partylist	11,492	0.03	0	0
Sulong Dignidad	8,120	0.02	0	0
Total	39,611,775	100.00	64	+1
Valid votes	39,611,775	69.07	+3.62	
Invalid/blank votes (Note: Includes 2,338,564 votes for Duterte Youth, which the Commission on Elections (COMELEC) second division cancelled its registration on June 18, 2025, which was later affirmed by the COMELEC en banc, thereby preventing all of its nominees from assuming their seats. The COMELEC then proclaimed three party-lists with one seat each as winners.)	17,739,183	30.93	−3.62	
Total votes	57,350,958	100.00	–	
Registered voters/turnout	69,673,655	82.31	−0.67	
Source: COMELEC (vote totals)

=== Local elections ===
Local elections above the barangay level were also held, with the following positions being contested, excluding sectoral and ex officio seats:

- All 82 governors and vice governors, and 840 out of 1,038 provincial board members
- All 149 city mayors and vice mayors, and 1,690 out of 1,988 city councilors
- All 1,493 municipal mayors and vice mayors, and 11,948 out of 14,934 municipal councilors

There were 231 candidates for governor, 198 for vice governor, 1,661 for provincial board members, 3,767 for mayors, 3,485 for vice mayors, and 31,385 for councilors.

== Aftermath ==
Former Duterte presidential spokesperson Harry Roque, who was seeking asylum in the Netherlands for what he says is political persecution, called President Marcos as a "lame duck", referring to the result of the election where three DuterTen candidates are within the top twelve candidates in the Senate election. The government replied that, if Marcos was indeed a lame duck, and that the government was no longer effective, then Roque should return to the Philippines.

On the weekend after the election, President Marcos, on a first podcast, said that "I don't want trouble. I want to get along with everyone. I have many enemies. I don't need enemies, what I need is a friend," in an apparent offer of reconciliation with the Dutertes. Senator Bong Go replied that the government should bring back Rodrigo Duterte from the Hague before any reconciliation occurs. The government later clarified that Marcos's statement on reconciliation was not just limited to the Dutertes, and that the government would also not bend the law for personal interests.

A week later, Marcos reshuffled the Cabinet and asked its members for their courtesy resignations, saying "The people have spoken, and they expect results — not politics, not excuses. We hear them, and we will act." In the first round of the reshuffle, Marcos accepted the resignations of environment secretary Toni Yulo-Loyzaga and human settlements secretary Jose Acuzar. Yulo-Loyzaga was then replaced by energy secretary Raphael Lotilla, who was then replaced by his undersecretary Sharon Garin. Acuzar was then reassigned as Presidential Adviser for the Pasig River Improvement with the rank of secretary, while being replaced by Ramon Aliling, his undersecretary. Foreign affairs secretary Enrique Manalo was reassigned as the country's representative to the United Nations; Ma. Theresa Lazaro then replaced Manalo.

Navotas representative Toby Tiangco, who served as Alyansa para sa Bagong Pilipinas's campaign manager, called the Senate results a "draw", saying that Alyansa's standings in Mindanao were adversely affected by the impeachment motion against Sara Duterte. Surigao del Norte representative Ace Barbers called the claim "misleading", noting that the majority of lawmakers in Mindanao who signed the impeachment complaint were reelected.

The Center for Strategic and International Studies (CSIS) noted that the Armed Forces of the Philippines played a critical role in securing polling stations and supporting the peaceful conduct of the 2025 midterm elections, ensuring voter safety and upholding democratic processes.
