= UniTeam =

Political party alliance in the Philippines

- Leader: Bongbong Marcos; Sara Duterte
- Founder: Bongbong Marcos; Sara Duterte
- Founded: November 29, 2021
- Dissolved: May 9, 2022
- Preceded by: Coalition for Change
- Succeeded by: Bagong Pilipinas (Marcos faction); DuterTen (Duterte faction)
- Ideology: Federalism; Filipino nationalism Populism
- Political position: Big tent
- Coalition members: PFP; Lakas; HNP; PMP; Guest Parties: Nacionalista; PDP–Laban (Cusi wing); KBL; PRP
- Colors: Red and green
- Slogan: Sama-sama tayong babangon muli transl. Together, we shall rise again

Website
- bbmsarauniteam.com

UniTeam was an electoral alliance in the Philippines formed to support the candidacies of Bongbong Marcos and Sara Duterte in the 2022 presidential and vice-presidential elections and their allies in the 2022 Philippine general election. The alliance was formalized on November 29, 2021, with Senator Imee Marcos coining the name UniTeam.

UniTeam, as an electoral alliance, was dissolved shortly after the landslide victories of both candidates in the 2022 national elections. The term "UniTeam" continued to be used to refer to the relationship between the president and vice president until relations deteriorated following Duterte's resignation from the Marcos cabinet in July 2024 and the antagonistic rhetoric of the Duterte family against Marcos in the subsequent months. The resulting feud between the Marcos and Duterte families has also been termed as "Kadiliman vs. Kasamaan" (lit. 'darkness vs. evil') by critics of the Marcos administration, taken from an accidental quote from lawyer Harry Roque interacting with Duterte supporters in August 2024.

== Coalition members ==
The alliance consists of four political parties:

Party	Abbreviation	Ideology	Chairperson	President
Hugpong ng Pagbabago; Alliance for Change	HNP	Regionalism	Sara Duterte	
Lakas–Christian Muslim Democrats; People Power–Christian Muslim Democrats	Lakas	Christian democracy Islamic democracy Conservatism; Filipino nationalism Federalism; Parliamentarianism	Bong Revilla Jr.	Martin Romualdez
Partido Federal ng Pilipinas; Federal Party of the Philippines	PFP	Federalism	Bongbong Marcos	Reynaldo Tamayo Jr.
Pwersa ng Masang Pilipino; Force of the Filipino Masses	PMP	Populism	Joseph Estrada	

In addition, the alliance's senatorial slate features guest candidates from the Nacionalista Party, Kilusang Bagong Lipunan (KBL), Nationalist People's Coalition (NPC), PDP–Laban, and People's Reform Party (PRP). Except for the NPC, all of the aforementioned parties are allied with Marcos and Duterte.

== Senatorial slate ==
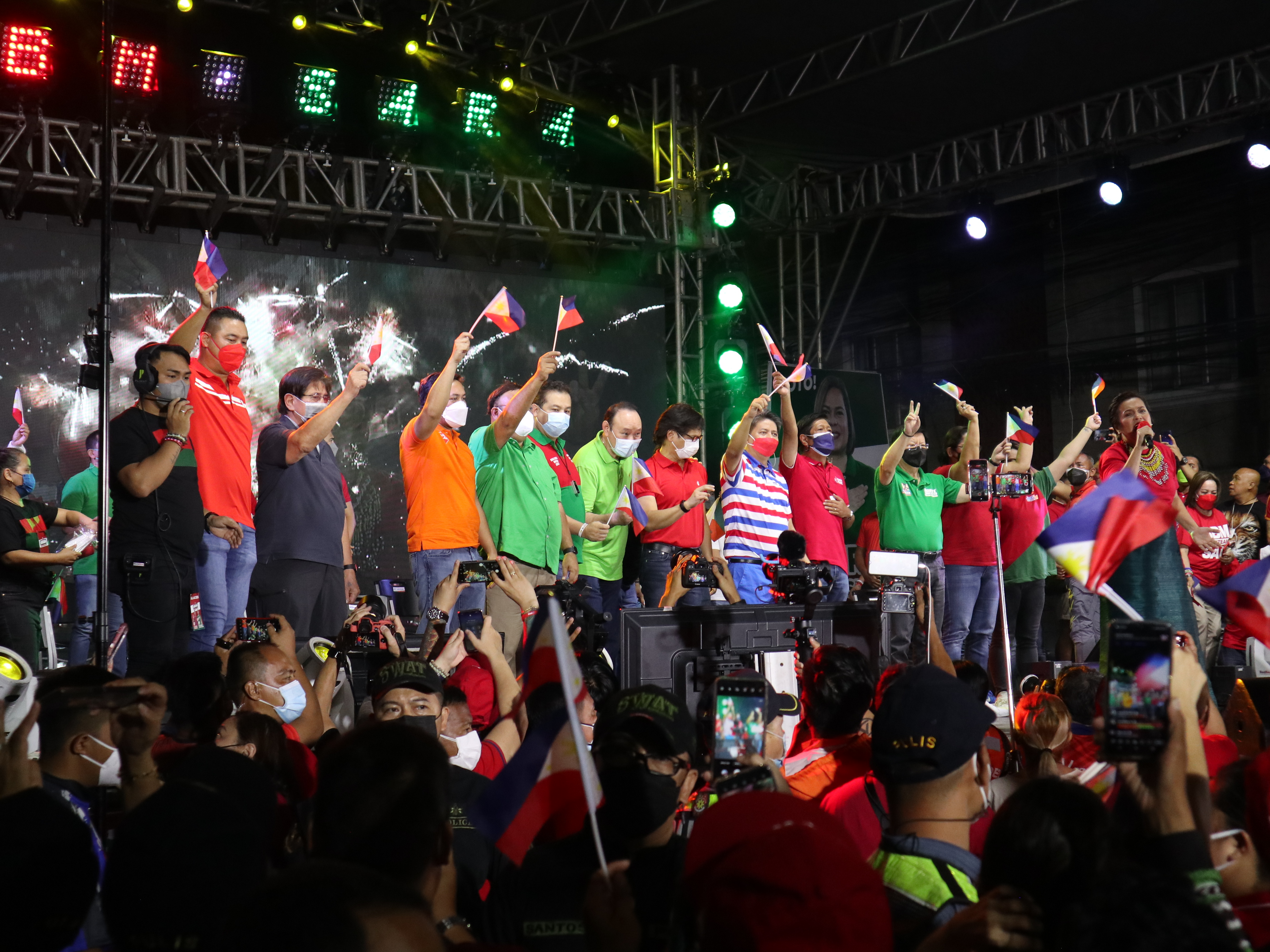
UniTeam Slate during an election campaign in Mandaluyong on February 13, 2022

Marcos and Duterte have endorsed the following candidates for the 2022 Philippine Senate election, thus who are part of their "senatorial slate":

Candidate name and party	Position	Votes	Ranking	Elected
Herbert Bautista; NPC	Former mayor of Quezon City (2010–2019)	13,104,710	14th	No
Jinggoy Estrada; PMP	Former senator (2004–2016)	15,108,625	12th	Yes
Larry Gadon; KBL	Lawyer	9,691,607	20th	No
Win Gatchalian; NPC	Incumbent senator	20,602,655	4th	Yes
Gregorio Honasan; Independent (Note: Guest candidate)	Former Secretary of Information and Communications Technology (2019–2021)	10,643,491	18th	No
Loren Legarda; NPC	Member of the House of Representatives from Antique's at-large congressional district	24,264,969	2nd	Yes
Rodante Marcoleta; PDP–Laban (withdrew)	Member of the House of Representatives from 1–SAGIP Party List	3,591,899 (stray votes)	— (Note: Rodante Marcoleta withdrew after the ballots have been printed.)	No
Robin Padilla; PDP–Laban	Actor	26,612,434	1st	Yes
Harry Roque; PRP	Former presidential spokesperson (2017–2018, 2020–2021)	11,246,206	17th	No
Gilbert Teodoro; PRP	Former Secretary of National Defense (2007–2009)	12,788,479	15th	No
Mark Villar; Nacionalista	Former Secretary of Public Works and Highways (2016–2021)	19,475,592	6th	Yes
Migz Zubiri; Independent	Incumbent senator	18,734,336	8th	Yes

=== Result by island group ===
==== Luzon ====
Candidate	Party	Votes	%	Rank	Top 12
Loren Legarda	NPC	14,409,131	46.60%	1	Yes
Robin Padilla	PDP-Laban	14,182,785	45.87%	2	Yes
Win Gatchalian	NPC	12,419,076	40.17%	5	Yes
Mark Villar	Nacionalista	10,937,117	35.37%	7	Yes
Migz Zubiri	Independent	9,751,779	31.54%	10	Yes
Jinggoy Estrada	PMP	8,515,488	27.54%	12	Yes
Herbert Bautista	NPC	7,947,384	25.70%	14	No
Gilbert Teodoro	PRP	6,737,566	21.79%	17	No
Gregorio Honasan	Independent	6,452,633	20.87%	18	No
Larry Gadon	KBL	6,067,028	19.62%	19	No
Harry Roque	PRP	5,852,430	18.93%	21	No
Turnout		30,917,665	100.00%		

==== Visayas ====
Candidate	Party	Votes	%	Rank	Top 12
Loren Legarda	NPC	4,639,491	40.20%	2	Yes
Robin Padilla	PDP-Laban	4,608,102	39.92%	3	Yes
Migz Zubiri	Independent	3,805,233	32.97%	5	Yes
Win Gatchalian	NPC	3,781,484	32.76%	6	Yes
Mark Villar	Nacionalista	3,688,636	31.96%	7	Yes
Gilbert Teodoro	PRP	2,594,726	22.48%	12	Yes
Jinggoy Estrada	PMP	2,587,706	22.42%	13	No
Herbert Bautista	NPC	2,244,043	19.44%	15	No
Harry Roque	PRP	2,044,282	17.71%	16	No
Gregorio Honasan	Independent	1,821,562	15.78%	18	No
Larry Gadon	KBL	1,441,629	12.49%	22	No
Turnout		11,542,445	100.00%		

==== Mindanao ====
Candidate	Party	Votes	%	Rank	Top 12
Robin Padilla	PDP-Laban	7,753,052	60.12%	1	Yes
Migz Zubiri	Independent	5,059,712	39.23%	2	Yes
Loren Legarda	NPC	4,889,046	37.91%	3	Yes
Mark Villar	Nacionalista	4,542,226	35.22%	4	Yes
Win Gatchalian	NPC	4,222,455	32.74%	7	Yes
Jinggoy Estrada	PMP	3,853,669	29.88%	8	Yes
Gilbert Teodoro	PRP	3,174,451	24.61%	11	Yes
Harry Roque	PRP	3,044,968	23.61%	13	No
Herbert Bautista	NPC	2,712,235	21.03%	15	No
Gregorio Honasan	Independent	2,160,484	16.75%	16	No
Larry Gadon	KBL	1,859,320	14.42%	19	No
Turnout		12,896,983	100.00%		

== Aftermath ==
It was clarified that the UniTeam was only made for the purpose of the 2022 election, and no formal meeting has been held among its members as an alliance since then.

UniTeam's Lakas-CMD formed the majority of the House of Representative's 19th Congress. This was the first time a vice president's party leads the lower house, although Marcos' Partido Federal ng Pilipinas is part of the coalition. Out of the twelve upcoming members of the 24-seat Senate, only Risa Hontiveros formed part of the opposition.

Vice President Sara Duterte was appointed as Marcos' first Secretary of Education after they both took office in mid-2022, although she preferred to be Secretary of Defense. Over the next two years, Duterte's relationship with Marcos' allies deteriorated, particularly with House Speaker Martin Romualdez and Marcos' wife and first lady Liza Araneta. She resigned in May 2023 from Lakas–CMD where she served as chairperson. Lakas is part of the ruling coalition.

In January 2024, President Marcos insisted that the UniTeam is still "vibrant", referring to his working relationship with his deputy.

Duterte tendered resignation from her position as education secretary in June 2024. When asked about her friendship with Marcos in September 2024, she said they were never friends and merely running mates in the 2022 elections. Marcos responded expressing he was "deceived" about their supposed friendship. In October 2024, she detailed her fallout with Marcos, who she says "does not know how to be president".

== See also ==
- Team Robredo–Pangilinan, the main rival of UniTeam in the 2022 elections
- TEAM Unity
