= Jocelyn Andamo =

Filipino health activist

Alyn Andamo
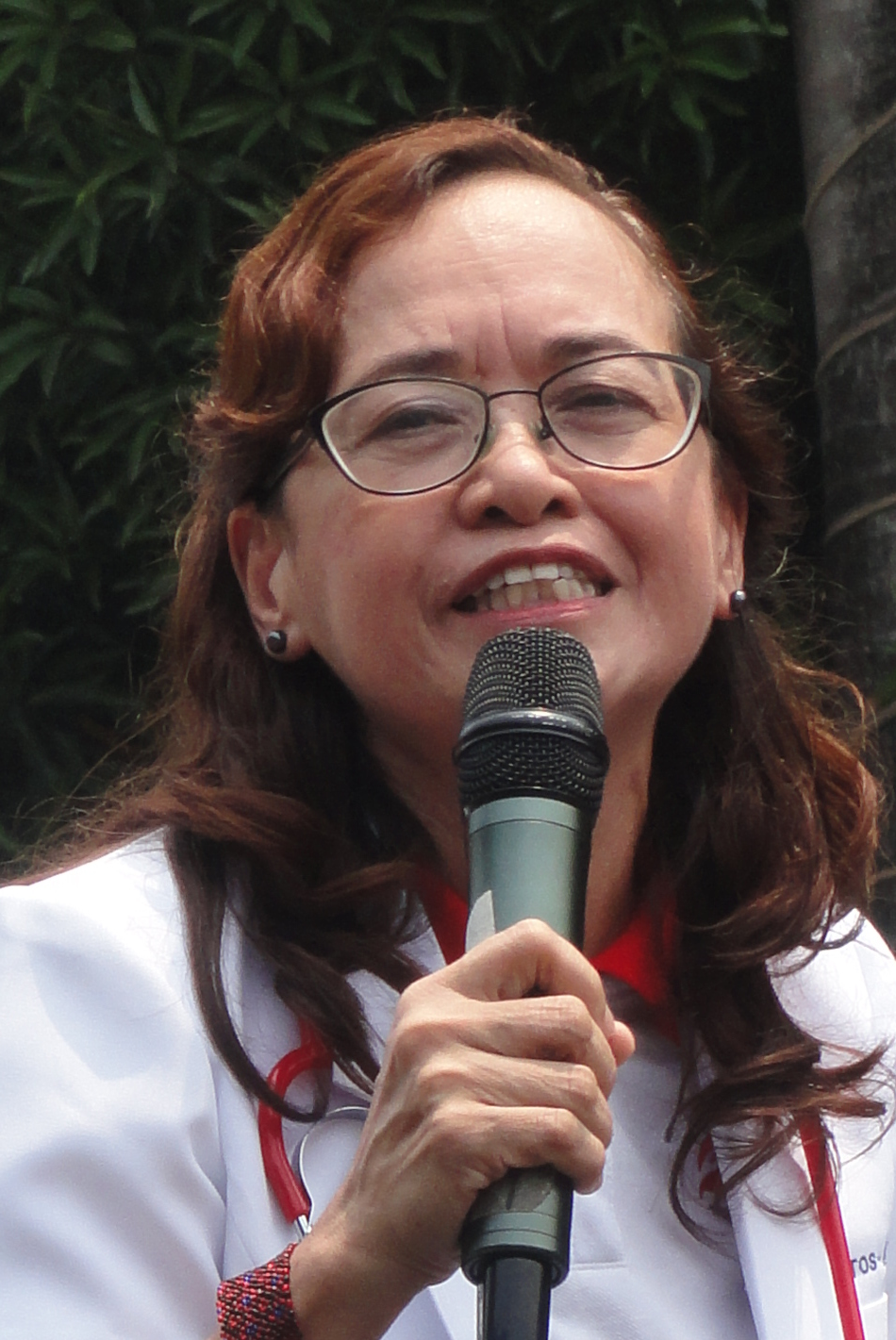
- Andamo at the Senate announcement of Makabayan for the 2025 Philippine general election.
- Born: Jocelyn Santos Andamo; April 23, 1963 (age 63); Manila
- Education: Far Eastern University(BS)
- Occupations: Nurse, Health activist
- Political party: Makabayan
- Spouse: Gerardo Andamo

Jocelyn Santos "Alyn" Andamo (born April 23, 1963) is a Filipino nurse and health activist who is the Secretary-General of Filipino Nurses United. In the 2025 Philippine Senate election, she ran under Makabayan.

== Early life ==
Andamo was born in the City of Manila.

Initially wanting to pursue dentistry as inspired by her parents, Andamo graduated from Far Eastern University Institute of Nursing as cum laude. After graduating in 1983, she became a day care nurse at the Philippine Nurses Association (PNA). She has had experience in community-based health programs. One of her first exposures to the health situation in the Philippines was her integration among indigenous and poverty-stricken rural communities in Quirino.

== Activism ==
Andamo has advocated for better working conditions, including higher wages for healthcare workers in the Philippines. She served as Education Committee Coordinator of the national democratic mass organization Alliance of Health Workers from 2009 to 2015. She was also a convener and founder of the Nagkakaisang Narses sa Adhikaing Reporma sa Kalusugan (NARS ng Bayan). She led campaigns against the privatization of government hospitals such as the Philippine Orthopedic Center, Philippine General Hospital, Dr. Jose Fabella Memorial Hospital, Tala Leprosarium, Philippine Heart Center, Lung Center of the Philippines, Philippine Children’s Medical Center, and National Kidney and Transplant Institute.

In 2021, she criticized the Department of Labor and Employment for the proposal to exchange Filipino nurses for COVID-19 vaccines, as if treating them as barter and commodities.

Together with calls for the betterment of healthcare workers, she has advocated for better public healthcare system in the Philippines.

She was revealed as part of Makabayan Senatoriable slate on National Heroes Day, August 26, 2024. She revealed that once elected, she would immediately file for monthly salary increase of ₱50,000 for nurses and ₱33,000 for other healthcare workers. Her and 10 other Makabayan bets would file their Certificates of Candidacy (COC) on October 4, 2024, for the 2025 Senate election. She would go on to lose the election and placed 46th and managed to garner 829,084 votes.
