= Alyansa para sa Bagong Pilipinas =

2025 Philippine general election coalition

- Leader: Bongbong Marcos
- Senate leader: Tito Sotto
- Campaign manager: Toby Tiangco
- Founder: Bongbong Marcos
- Founded: May 8, 2024; 2 years ago
- Dissolved: June 30, 2025; 13 months ago
- Preceded by: UniTeam (Marcos faction)
- Ideology: Bagong Pilipinas movement
- Coalition members: PFP; Lakas; NUP; NPC; Nacionalista
- Colors: Red; White; Blue

The Alyansa para sa Bagong Pilipinas (lit. 'Alliance for a New Philippines') was an electoral alliance formed to field candidates for the 2025 Philippine general election. Formed by allies of the administration of President Bongbong Marcos, the alliance includes the Partido Federal ng Pilipinas (PFP), Lakas–CMD, NUP, NPC, and the Nacionalista Party.

== History ==
=== Formation ===
On May 8, 2024, the Partido Federal ng Pilipinas (PFP) and Lakas–CMD signed an alliance agreement at the Manila Polo Club in Makati to form the Alyansa Para sa Bagong Pilipinas (Alliance for the New Philippines) for the 2025 general elections. House Speaker Martin Romualdez remarked that the formation of the alliance created the "most powerful political force in our country today", noting the positioning of the PFP as the de facto ruling party in the country and Lakas' status as the largest political party in the House of Representatives.

Romualdez also implied that the coalition plans to include "all major parties", including the Nacionalista Party, which began negotiations with the alliance on July 2. President Marcos remarked that the alliance aims to be based "not on political expediency but on ideology" that focuses on unity and a new Philippines. Two parties would sign alliance agreements with the coalition: the Nationalist People's Coalition on May 19, and the National Unity Party on June 29. The Nacionalista Party formally entered the coalition on August 8.

On May 10, 2024, former Senator Manny Pacquiao announced his senatorial candidacy as a member of the alliance while remaining a member of PROMDI. Reelectionist Senator Imee Marcos, the sister of the president and PFP chairman, noted that she was unsure of her inclusion in the coalition, though the entry of the Nacionalista Party in the alliance ensured her inclusion in its ticket.

=== Election period ===
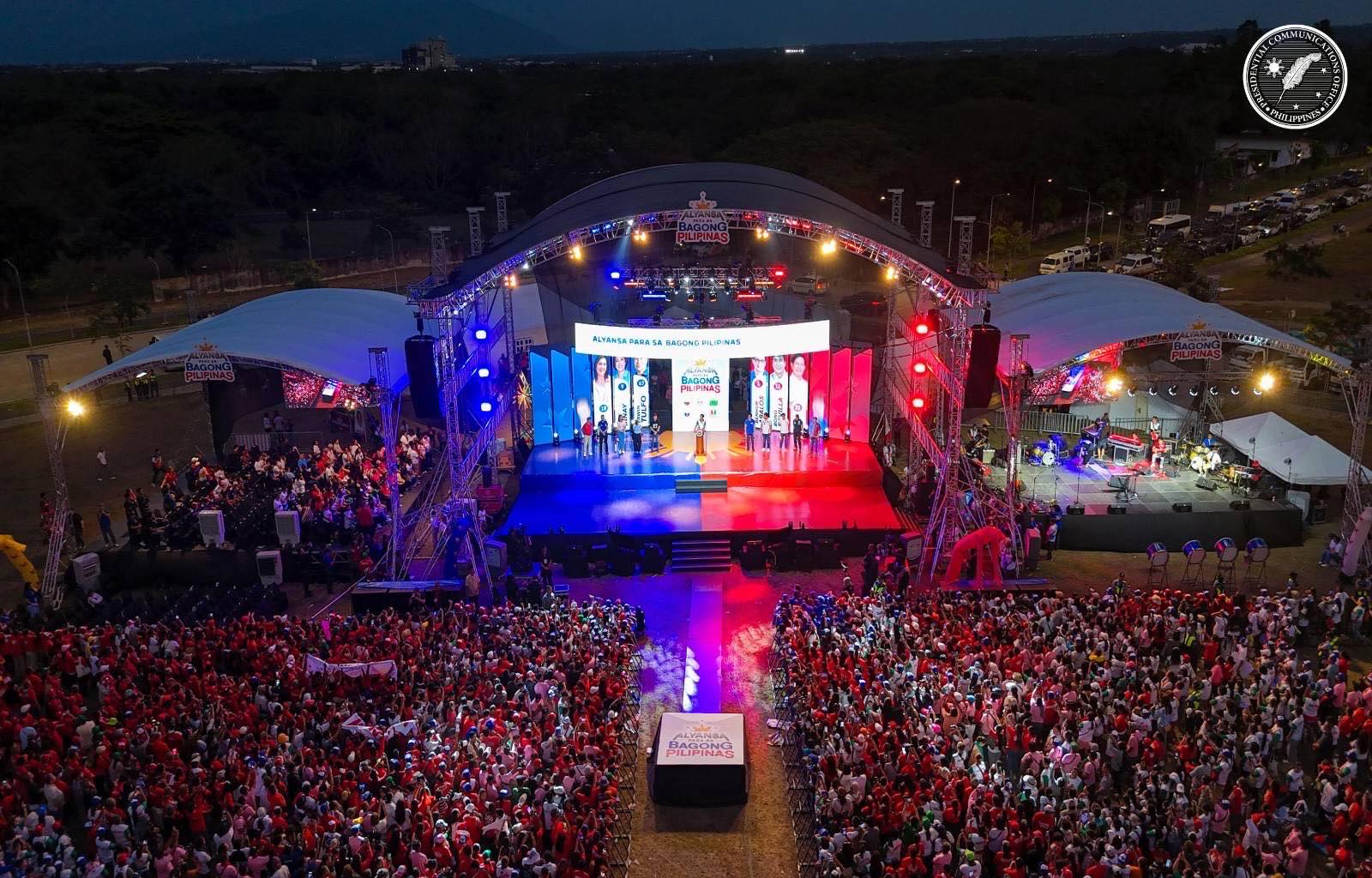
Alyansa para sa Bagong Pilipinas rally held on March 22, 2025, at Nuvali East Bloc, Santa Rosa, Laguna

In preparation for the 2025 elections, Alyansa para sa Bagong Pilipinas held its first political rally on February 11, 2025, at the Ilocos Norte Centennial Arena in Laoag, Ilocos Norte, President Marcos's home province.

== Coalition members ==
Party	Abbreviation	Ideology	Chairperson	President
Partido Federal ng Pilipinas; Federal Party of the Philippines	PFP	Federalism	Bongbong Marcos	Reynaldo Tamayo Jr.
Lakas–Christian Muslim Democrats; People Power–Christian Muslim Democrats	Lakas	Christian democracy Islamic democracy	Bong Revilla	Martin Romualdez
National Unity Party	NUP	Christian democracy Social conservatism	Ronaldo Puno	Luis Raymund Villafuerte
Nationalist People's Coalition	NPC	Conservatism; Social conservatism	Tito Sotto	Jack Duavit
Nacionalista Party; Nationalist Party	Nacionalista	Filipino nationalism Conservatism	Cynthia Villar	Manny Villar

== Senatorial slate ==
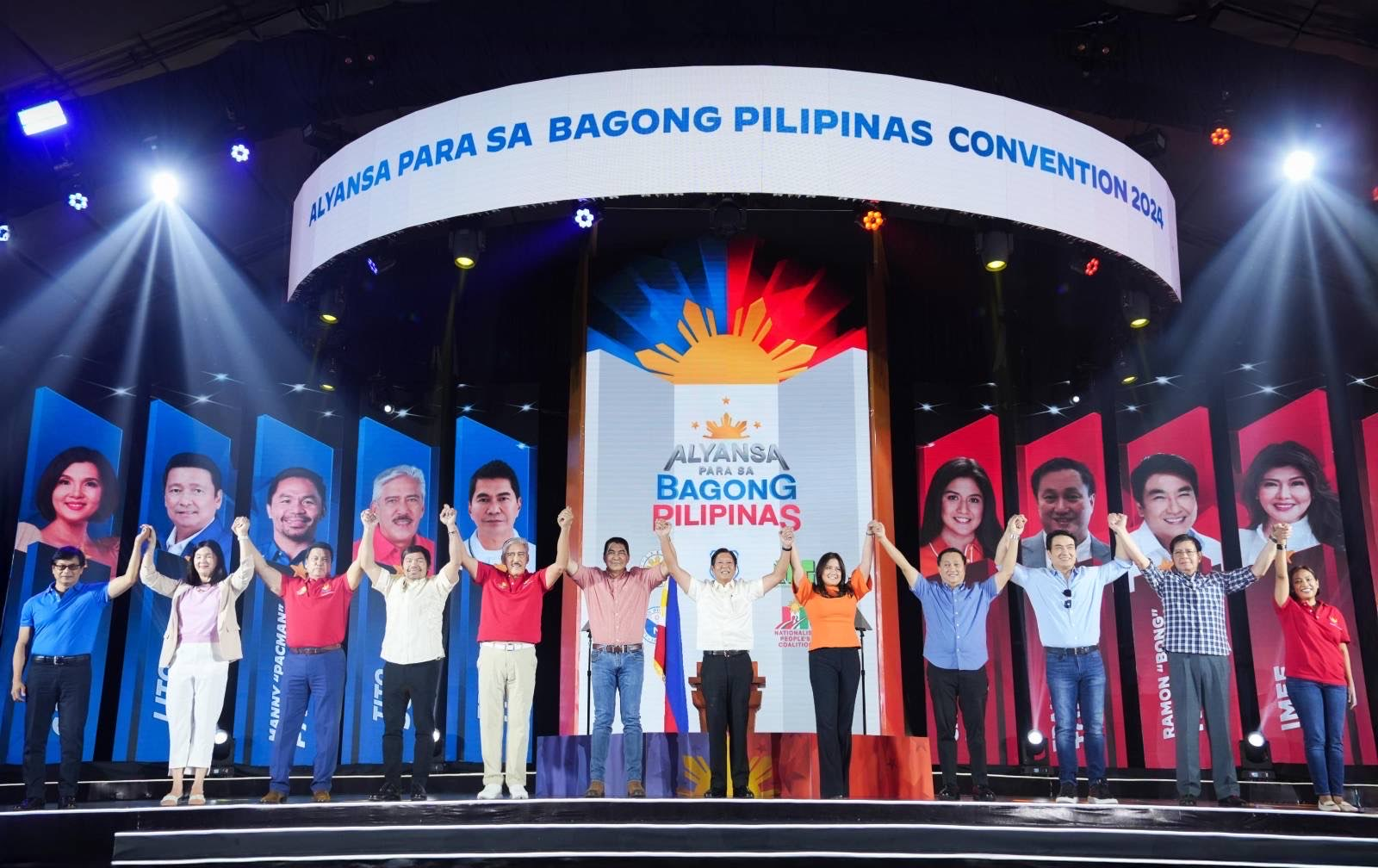
Members of the prospective senatorial slate presented on September 26, 2024.

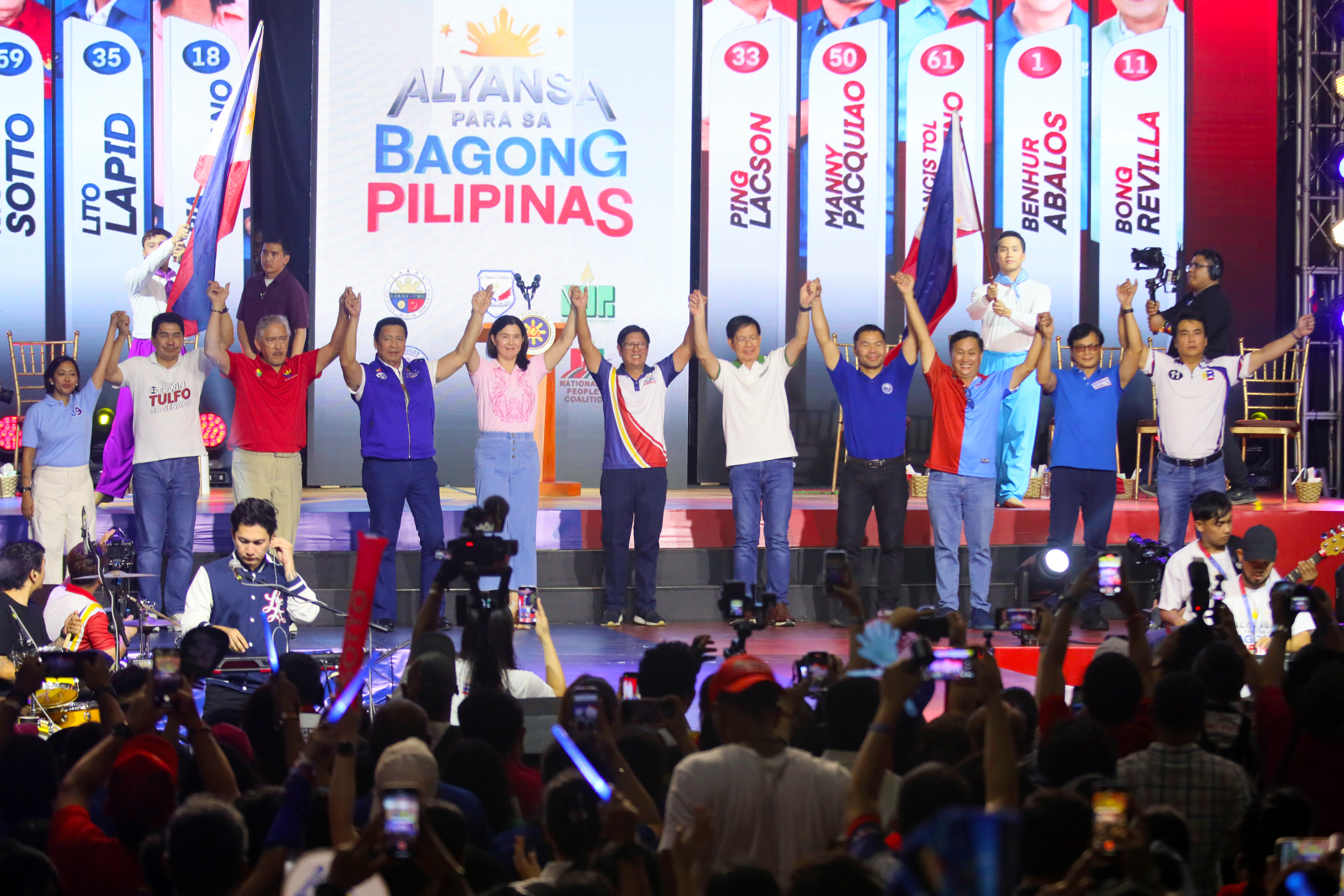
Members of the senatorial slate during their final campaign rally in Mandaluyong. Camille Villar did not attend the event.

Party leaders under the alliance met on August 19, 2024. on the same day, Erwin Tulfo noted that the administration "still has no final senatorial lineup", though several members of the constituent parties—including Lito Lapid, Manny Pacquiao, Bong Revilla, Tito Sotto, Francis Tolentino, and Camille Villar—had announced senatorial bids prior to the presentation of the final lineup. At the alliance's national convention held at the Philippine International Convention Center Forum in Pasay on September 26, President Marcos formally announced the prospective senatorial slate.

Candidates	Party	Position	Votes	%	Rank	Elected	Ref.
Benhur Abalos	PFP	Secretary of the Interior and Local Government (2022–2024)	11,580,520	20.19%	16	No	
Abigail Binay	NPC	Mayor of Makati (2016–2025)	11,808,645	20.59%	15	No	
Bong Revilla	Lakas	Senator (2004–2016, 2019–2025)	12,027,845	20.97%	14	No	
Pia Cayetano	Nacionalista	Senator (2004–2016, 2019–present)	14,573,430	25.41%	9	Yes	
Panfilo Lacson	Independent (guest for NPC)	Senator (2001–2013, 2016–2022)	15,106,111	26.34%	7	Yes	
Lito Lapid	NPC	Senator (2004–2016, 2019–present)	13,394,102	23.35%	11	Yes	
Manny Pacquiao	PFP	Senator (2016–2022)	10,397,133	18.13%	18	No	
Tito Sotto	NPC	Senator (1992–2004, 2010–2022)	14,832,996	25.86%	8	Yes	
Francis Tolentino	PFP	Senator (2019–2025)	7,702,550	13.43%	25	No	
Erwin Tulfo	Lakas	Representative for ACT-CIS Partylist (2022–2025)	17,118,881	29.85%	4	Yes	
Camille Villar	Nacionalista	Representative from Las Piñas's at-large district (2019–2025)	13,651,274	23.80%	10	Yes	

=== Declined endorsement ===
On September 28, 2024, Imee Marcos initially declined the endorsement of the alliance and chose to run an independent campaign, citing difficulties brought by her inclusion in the alliance. However, she was reintroduced as a member of the slate during their first rally on February 11, 2025.

In the aftermath of the arrest of Rodrigo Duterte, Marcos withdrew again on March 26, saying that she could "no longer stand on the same platform with the rest of the Alyansa senatorial candidates." Marcos had already skipped the slate's campaign rallies after Duterte's arrest.

On May 10, 2025, two days before the midterm elections, Marcos and fellow Alyansa candidate Camille Villar were adopted by the opposing PDP–Laban as its guest candidates.

Candidate	Party	Position	Declined	Ref.
Imee Marcos	Nacionalista	Senator (2019–present)	September 28, 2024; March 26, 2025	

== See also ==
- Bagong Pilipinas (campaign)
- DuterTen, their main coalition rival
- KiBam, their secondary coalition rival
- Solid North Party, pro-Marcos partylist running for House of Representatives
- TEAM Unity, the administration coalition in 2007
- UniTeam, their 2022 predecessor
