= DuterTen =

2025 Philippine general elections coalition

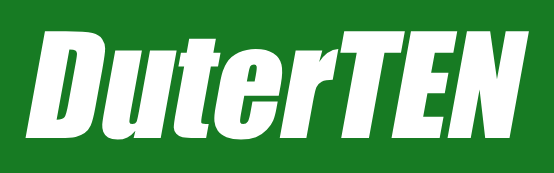
- Leader: Rodrigo Duterte
- Senate leader: Bong Go
- Campaign manager: Robin Padilla
- Founded: September 20, 2024 (as PDP Senatorial slate); April 10, 2025 (as DuterTen)
- Dissolved: June 30, 2025; 16 months ago
- Preceded by: UniTeam (Duterte faction); Tuloy ang Pagbabago
- Succeeded by: RAGE Coalition (national coalition)
- Ideology: Dutertismo
- National affiliation: PDP–Laban
- Coalition members: PDP–Laban; Reporma; PDDS
- Colors: Green

DuterTen (stylized as Duter10, DuterTEN, or Duter–Ten; a portmanteau of "Duterte" and "ten") was a major opposition coalition for the 2025 Philippine Senate election. It was formed to oppose the Marcos administration-backed Alyansa para sa Bagong Pilipinas and support the senatorial candidates allied with former President Rodrigo Duterte. The DuterTen was headed by Partido Demokratiko Pilipino (now PDP–Laban), which formed coalition agreements with Partido para sa Demokratikong Reporma and Pederalismo ng Dugong Dakilang Samahan.

== History ==
=== Formation ===
On September 20, 2024, Partido Demokratiko Pilipino formed an alliance with Partido para sa Demokratikong Reporma, Pederalismo ng Dugong Dakilang Samahan and Mayor Rodrigo Roa Duterte–National Executive Coordinating Committee (MRRD–NECC) for the 2025 Philippine Senate election. Greco Belgica of PDDS and Pantaleon Alvarez of Reporma signed the agreement.

=== Filing of candidacies ===
In October 2024, the initial three PDP senatorial nominees, re-electionists Ronald dela Rosa and Bong Go, and Phillip Salvador, filed their candidacies. Singer-lawyer Jimmy Bondoc, former Cagayan Economic Zone Authority administrator Raul Lambino, and former Presidential Anti-Corruption Commission commissioner Jayvee Hinlo also filed their bids for senator under the PDP banner.

Three independent Duterte-allied senatorial candidates, former Executive Secretary Vic Rodriguez, SAGIP Partylist representative Rodante Marcoleta, and evangelist pastor Apollo Quiboloy, were also added into the lineup, ending up with nine senatorial candidates. Eric Martinez, PDP vice president for Luzon and an independent senatorial candidate, opted not to join the slate as he intended to "discharge any political bandages." The PDP formally launched its senatorial slate on February 13, 2025, at the Club Filipino in San Juan, Metro Manila.

On April 10, 2025, pediatrician and content creator Richard Mata, an independent senatorial candidate and uncle of Bong Go, officially joined the slate, completing the DuterTen lineup.

=== DuterTen+2 ===
==== Sara Duterte's +2 ====
After Duterte's arrest on March 11, 2025, his daughter, Vice President Sara Duterte, has actively campaigned for the DuterTen lineup. In April 2025, Sara Duterte also endorsed presidential sister and incumbent senator Imee Marcos and Las Piñas representative Camille Villar of rival Alyansa para sa Bagong Pilipinas. Marcos obtained the endorsement of Vice President Duterte after bolting the Alyansa, her brother's senatorial slate, and the two appeared on a television advertisement wearing black shirts. On May 10, 2025, the PDP formally adopted Marcos and Villar as guest candidates of the DuterTen slate.

==== Paolo and Rodrigo Duterte's +2 ====
Former president Duterte and his son, Davao City 1st district representative Paolo Duterte, fielded their own two additional candidates: former senator Gregorio Honasan and former Marine officer and Medal of Valor awardee Ariel Querubin, both former colonels.

== Coalition partners ==
=== Political parties ===
| Party | Abbr. | Chairperson | President | Date joined | Ref. |
|---|---|---|---|---|---|
| Partido Demokratiko Pilipino; Philippine Democratic Party | PDP | Rodrigo Duterte | Robin Padilla | – | |
| Partido para sa Demokratikong Reporma; Party for Democratic Reform | Reporma | Vacant | Pantaleon Alvarez | September 20, 2024 | |
| Pederalismo ng Dugong Dakilang Samahan; Federalism of the Noble Blooded Association | PDDS | Eduardo Bringas | Greco Belgica | September 20, 2024 | |

=== Non-political groups ===
- Mayor Rodrigo Roa Duterte—National Executive Coordinating Committee
- Hakbang ng Maisug

== Senatorial slate ==
=== Official slate ===
| Candidate | Party | Position | Votes | Rank | Elected |
|---|---|---|---|---|---|
| Jimmy Bondoc | PDP | Former Member of the Board of Directors of Philippine Amusement and Gaming Corporation (2021–2022) | 10,615,598 | 17th | No |
| Ronald dela Rosa | PDP | Incumbent senator | 20,773,946 | 3rd | Yes |
| Bong Go | PDP | Incumbent senator | 27,121,073 | 1st | Yes |
| Jayvee Hinlo | PDP | Former Commissioner of the Presidential Anti-Corruption Commission (2021–2022) | 7,471,704 | 26th | No |
| Raul Lambino | PDP | Former Chief Executive Officer of the Cagayan Economic Zone Authority (2017–2022) | 8,383,593 | 24th | No |
| Rodante Marcoleta | Independent | Member of the House of Representatives from SAGIP Partylist (2016–2025) | 15,250,723 | 6th | Yes |
| Imee Marcos | Nacionalista (Note: Guest candidate) | Incumbent senator | 13,339,227 | 12th | Yes |
| Richard Mata | Independent | None | 5,789,181 | 30th | No |
| Apollo Quiboloy | Independent | Former spiritual adviser to President Rodrigo Duterte (2016–2022) | 5,719,041 | 31st | No |
| Vic Rodriguez | Independent | Former executive secretary (2022) | 8,450,668 | 23rd | No |
| Phillip Salvador | PDP | None | 10,241,491 | 19th | No |
| Camille Villar | Nacionalista | Member of the House of Representatives from Las Piñas' at-large district (2019–2025) | 13,651,274 | 10th | Yes |

=== Paolo and Rodrigo Duterte's DuterTen + 2 endorsements ===
| Candidate | Party | Position | Votes | Rank | Elected |
|---|---|---|---|---|---|
| Gregorio Honasan | Reform PH | Former senator (1995–2004, 2007–2019) | 6,700,772 | 28th | No |
| Ariel Querubin | Nacionalista | None | 3,950,051 | 36th | No |

== Aftermath ==
After the victory of Go, Marcoleta, and dela Rosa, the three joined the majority bloc and voted for Chiz Escudero as Senate President. Marcoleta also grabbed the Blue Ribbon Committee chairmanship, leading the investigations on flood control projects controversy. But a Senate leadership coup occurred which installed Tito Sotto to replace Escudero as Senate President in September 8, 2025. The three of them, and Imee Marcos now part of the minority bloc, with Marcoleta losing the Blue Ribbon chairmanship and awarding it to Sotto's former running-mate Ping Lacson. However, Lacson's tenure as chairman ended abruptly less than a month later on October 6, 2025, and submitted his resignation to Sotto.

== See also ==
- UniTeam
- Coalition for Change
- Hugpong ng Pagbabago
- KiBam, another opposition coalition at the 2025 Philippine Senate election
- Duterte Youth
- Hakbang ng Maisug
