= Richard Mata =

Filipino pediatrician and media personality

- Born: Richard Tesoro Mata; February 5, 1972 (age 54); Davao City, Philippines
- Education: Davao Medical School Foundation (M.D.)
- Occupations: Pediatrician; vlogger
- Political party: Independent (since 2024); KABAYAN (partylist)
- Spouse: Erika Soriano
- Children: 3
- Relatives: Bong Go (nephew)

YouTube information
- Channel: Dr. Richard and Erika Mata
- Genre: Informative vlogging
- Subscribers: 135 thousand
- Views: 5.7 million
- Last updated: March 14, 2026

Richard Tesoro Mata (born February 5, 1972) is a Filipino pediatrician and media personality.

== Medical career ==
Mata graduated from Davao Medical School Foundation, which he got his M.D. degree in 1997. He also got his Diplomate American Board M.D. and Diplomate National Board in 2001 while at San Pedro Hospital. He currently working as a physician for Good Shepherd Hospital of Panabo City, Inc.

He is notable for an article called Solving Dengue Fever. In the said article, it was stating that in an Idiopathic Thrombocytopenic purpura or ITP case a patient remains normal even with 10K platelet count, if the patient is always hydrated. Platelet transfusion may present a wrong picture of the water/fluid leak of the Dengue infected patient, hence it should be avoided and proper hydration should be maintained.

In 2014, he was interviewed by SunStar about his development of a web-based application software for patients' safety, and to promote computerization of medical facilities and institution on handling files of the patients. It was centered on Computerization of Prescriptions and Patient Records in a bid to address major concerns, but some doctors reluctant and still using the traditional writing method. The reasons for this according to him was: (1) Doctors think clinic computerization is difficult and may take more time than writing; (2) Software programming is expensive; (3) There is no government or medical society project that promotes computerization of prescriptions. He started the development of the software in 2004.

== Internet career ==
In 2008, he started his YouTube career by uploading videos about showing his web-based application software for safely storing patients' records and for prescriptions, and some seminars and interviews about dengue. But, after some years, he started to give medical advice in a Q-and-A type. In TikTok, he started to create comedic skits with inserting some medical facts. He is also giving some comments about some issues, and nicknamed as Pambansang Marites na Doktor.

In 2024, amidst of family issues of Carlos Yulo and Milo's selection of EJ Obiena as its new brand ambassador, he jokingly answered questions of the netizen's Milo snub of Yulo saying: The one who buys Milo are mothers, not girlfriends. (Tagalog, original post: “Dahil alam ng Milo na ang bumibili ng Milo ay mga nanay, hindi mga girlfriends.”)

== Political career ==
In 2022, Mata was selected as one of the nominees of Kabayan Partylist.

On October 7, 2024, he filed certificate of candidacy for a senate seat for the 2025 elections. He raised the issue of late diagnosis of children with disabilities like autism, blaming it on bureaucratic system in the government, and stating that lack of free and accessible medical needs can burden the parents of those children. He proposed a better coordination with the Philippine Society for Developmental and Behavioral Pediatrics, which facilitates the diagnosis of such disorders among children. He ran running as an independent candidate. on April 10, 2025, Mata joined the Duterten senatorial slate, officially completing the line up. Mata ended up in 30th place with 5,789,181 votes or 1.35% of the votes.

== Personal life ==
He is married to Erika Soriano, who started a women's livelihood program and to young scholars. They have 3 children, named: Patricia, Amanda, and the youngest, Rich.

He is also the uncle of Senator Bong Go, as Go's mother is Mata's cousin.

== Electoral history ==
Electoral history of Richard Mata
Year	Office	Party	Votes received				Result
Year	Office	Party	Total	%	P.	Swing	Result
2022	Representative (Party-list)	KABAYAN	280,066	0.77%	45th	—N/a	Won one out of three seats
2025	Senator of the Philippines	Independent	5,789,181	10.09%	30th	—N/a	Lost
