= Jimmy Bondoc =

Filipino pop singer

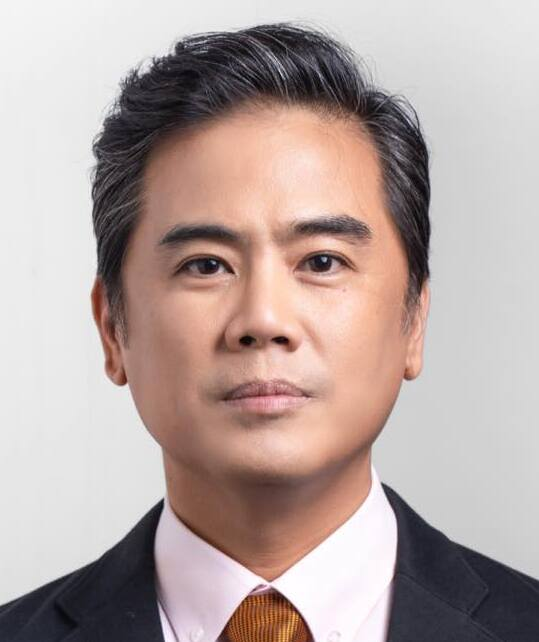
- Bondoc in October 2024

Member of the Board of Directors of Philippine Amusement and Gaming Corporation
- In office September 15, 2021 – June 30, 2022
- Appointed by: Rodrigo Duterte

Vice President for Corporate Social Responsibility Group of Philippine Amusement and Gaming Corporation
- In office October 2017 – July 2022

Assistant Vice President for Entertainment of Philippine Amusement and Gaming Corporation
- In office July 10, 2016 – October 2017
- Appointed by: Rodrigo Duterte

Personal details
- Born: James Patrick Romero Bondoc; May 31, 1975 (age 51) Quezon City, Metro Manila, Philippines
- Party: PDP (since 2024)
- Spouse: Isabel Torrijos (m. 2025)
- Education: Ateneo de Manila University (AB); University of the East (JD)
- Occupation: Singer, composer, producer, lawyer
- Musical career
- Genres: OPM, pop
- Labels: Star Music; Sony BMG; Ivory Music; Warner Music Philippines

James Patrick Romero Bondoc (born May 31, 1975) is a Filipino musician, songwriter, lawyer, politician, and former government official.

He is known for the songs "Let Me Be The One", "I Believe", and "Hanggang Dito Na Lang".

In the run-up to the 2016 Philippine presidential election, Bondoc was among the celebrities who endorsed Rodrigo Duterte's successful campaign. From 2016 to 2022, Duterte appointed him to serve in the Philippine Amusement and Gaming Corporation (PAGCOR).

== Early life and education ==
Bondoc was born on May 31, 1975 in Quezon City. He studied at the Ateneo de Manila University from elementary to college, graduating with a degree of Bachelor of Arts in Communications. In 2017, Bondoc started studying law at San Beda University. In 2019, he transferred to the University of the East. He graduated in 2023 and passed Philippine Bar Examinations the same year.

== Music career ==
Bondoc is an acoustic musician who has composed and produced songs. He is known for his original hits "The Man I Was With You", "Akin Na Lang Sana Siya", and his biggest hit, "Let Me Be The One". In 2002, he founded Magis Productions, where he also served as its president until 2016. One of the songs from his 2006 album Undercover, "I believe", is an adaptation of South Korean singer Shin Seung-hun's song of the same title, which was released in 2002. In 2009, Bondoc released his album entitled Walang Araw, Walang Ulan, under Sony-BMG. In 2010, the album Ang Mahiwagang Bisikleta at Ang Huling Makata was released.

Bondoc was a resident juror on Twist and Shout, a Philippine version of Sing If You Can franchise. He was also a regular celebrity mentor on the "Bida Kapamilya" segment of It's Showtime. He also served as a radio host for The RnB Show at 97.9 Natural (now known as 97.9 Home Radio) with Duncan Ramos until the end of 2014. He was also part of the band called the Sabado Boys alongside Luke Mejares, Paolo Santos and Dj Myke.

== Government and politics ==
In 2015, Bondoc was among the celebrities who campaigned for Rodrigo Duterte's successful presidential campaign. He composed the song "Takbo" (lit. 'Run'), performed by various OPM artists who urged the then-Davao City mayor Duterte to officially run for president.

=== PAGCOR ===
In July 2016, Bondoc was appointed by President Duterte as the Assistant Vice President for Entertainment of the Philippine Amusement and Gaming Corporation (PAGCOR), replacing Bong Quintaña. His appointment did not come without criticisms as citizens questioned his qualifications for the post. He later served as PAGCOR's vice president for Corporate Social Responsibility (CSR) Group from October 2017 to July 2021.

On September 10, 2021, he was named as a member of the Board of Directors of PAGCOR, serving to complete the unfinished term of deceased Director Reynaldo Concordia. He took on September 15 by an official in Barangay Pinagkaisahan, Quezon City and would serve until June 30, 2022.

=== Palit-Bise rally ===
In April 2017, Bondoc, a critic of Vice President Leni Robredo, was one of the organizers of "Palit-Bise" rally held at the Rizal Park in Manila. Held by pro-Duterte supporters, the Philippine National Police estimated that the crowd numbered only to 4,500 in comparison with the millions who voted for Duterte. The rally was said to be funded by donations coming from OFW supporters of the president through the Gava Gives online platform. Questions were raised if collected funds were taxable. On March 28, 2017, in a press conference prior to the rally, there were reported instances of bloggers and journalists receiving "gas money", for those who took public transport to go to the press conference.

=== Shutdown of ABS-CBN broadcasting ===
In May 2019, Bondoc expressed eagerness on the imminent expiration of ABS-CBN's legislative franchise. On June 12, 2019, he celebrated the news of the House of Representatives freezing the discussions on the renewal of the media company's broadcasting franchise.

After the shutdown of ABS-CBN on May 5, 2020, Bondoc posted a sarcastic speech on the "closure" of a giant network, saying "he is not happy" and is wishing for forgiveness.

=== 2022 elections ===
During the 2022 Philippine general election campaign period, Bondoc supported the presidential bid of his fellow celebrity, Manila mayor Isko Moreno by performing at the latter's campaign rally.

=== 2025 Senate bid ===
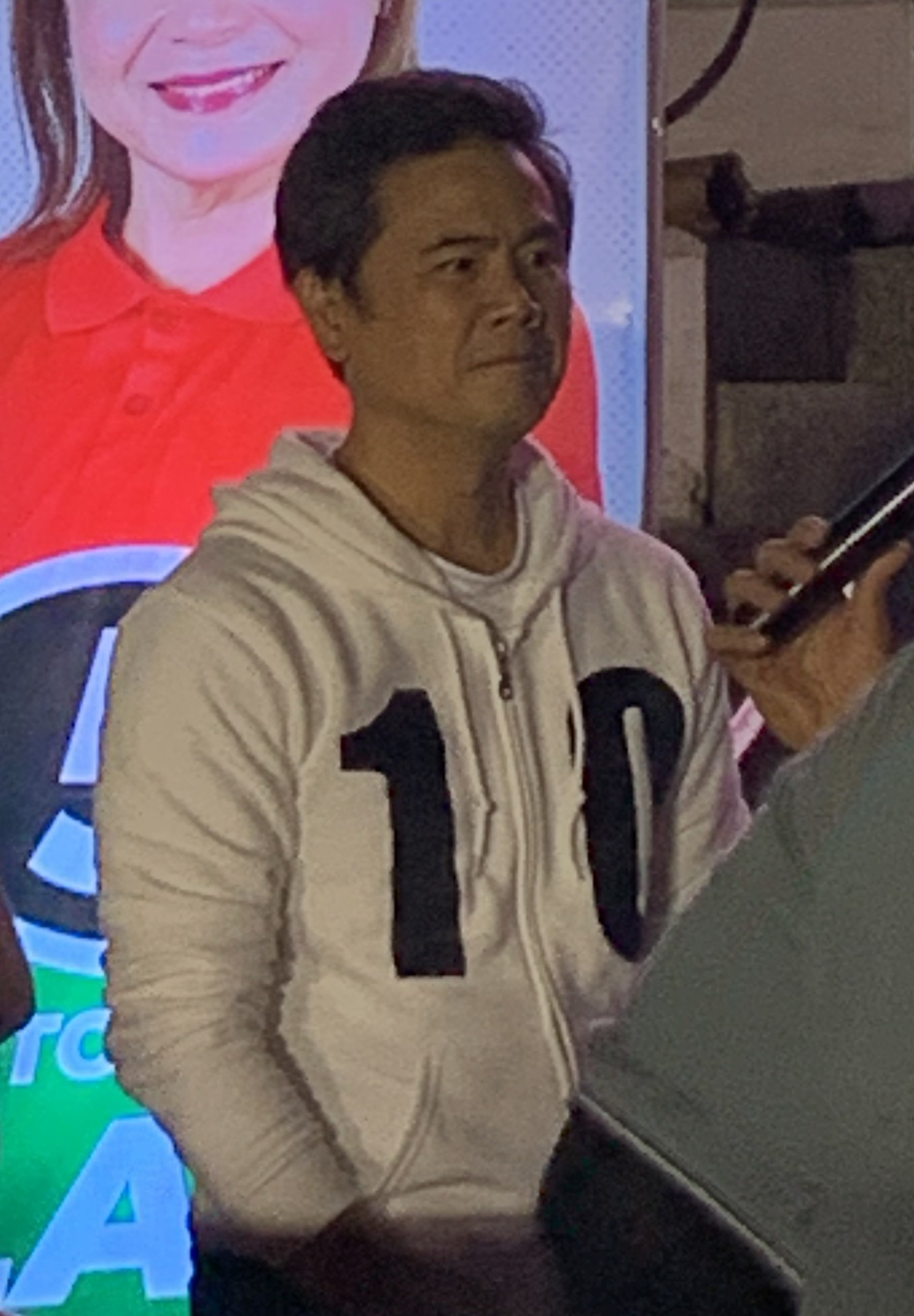
Bondoc in a DuterTen rally

On October 6, 2024, Bondoc filed his candidacy for the 2025 Philippine Senate elections under the Duterte-led Partido Demokratiko Pilipino (PDP).

Bondoc lost the election placing 17th in the official results, gaining 10,615,538 votes and 18.51% of the vote.

== Personal life ==
From 2002 to 2005, Bondoc had a relationship with singer Nina. He also faced disputes with Nyoy Volante. Bondoc married his fellow lawyer, Isabel Torrijos, on February 2, 2025 at the Manila Cathedral.

On August 2, 2022, a fire razed Bondoc's studio, damaging musical instruments and equipment worth ₱1 million.

== Discography ==
- Jimmy Bondoc (2000)
- Musikero (2004)
- Undercovers (2005)
- Fight for the Write (2015)

== Awards ==
Association	Category	Result
22nd Aliw Awards	Best Performance in a Concert (Smaller Venue)	Won
1st Philippine radio Music Awards	Alternative Solo Artist of the Year (Hanggang Dito Na Lang); Best Pop Male (Hanggang Dito Na Lang)	Nominated
Aliw Awards	Best Male Performer	Nominated
Business Excellence Awards	Best Acoustic Male Performer	Won
IFM Pinoy Music Awards	Best Acoustic Male Performer	Won
Awit Awards	Nomination for the song "Let Me Be The One"	Nominated
Business Excellence Awards	Most Popular Song by a Male Performer	Won
Aliw Awards	Best Male Performer	Won
Aliw Awards	"Last Year's Christmas" for Best Christmas Song; Best Male Performer	Nominated
Aliw Awards	Best Performance in a Concert Collaboration	Won
MTV Pilipinas Awards	Favorite Male Artist; Best Video for The Man I Was With You	Nominated
