= Jayvee Hinlo =

Filipino lawyer and politician

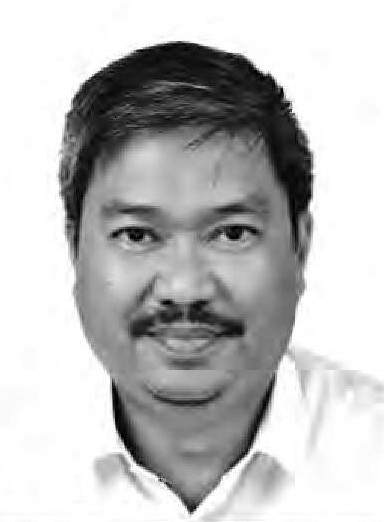
- Hinlo's certificate of candidacy photo in 2024

Commissioner of the Presidential Anti-Corruption Commission
- In office January 29, 2022 – June 30, 2022

1st Party president of Partido Federal ng Pilipinas
- In office 2018–2018
- Preceded by: position established
- Succeeded by: John Castriciones

Personal details
- Born: Jesus Villanueva Hinlo; April 20, 1971 (age 55) Bacolod, Negros Occidental, Philippines
- Party: PDP (2024–present)
- Other political affiliations: Independent (2020–2024); PFP (2018–2020); Partido Pag Bag-o (2009–2010)
- Education: University of Negros Occidental – Recoletos; University of Santo Tomas
- Occupation: Public servant
- Profession: Lawyer

Jesus "Jayvee" Villanueva Hinlo, Jr. (born April 20, 1971) is a Filipino lawyer and politician who formerly served as Commissioner of the Presidential Anti-Corruption Commission in 2022 under the latter years of Rodrigo Duterte's presidency.

== Legal practice and offices held ==
In 2005, Hinlo who worked for Amado Parreño Law Office from 2005 to 2008. After he left Amado Parreño, he established his own law office as a trial lawyer.

Hinlo had served as an undersecretary of the Department of the Interior and Local Government (DILG) from 2016 to 2017. He was appointed as Director of the Land Bank of the Philippines from 2017. In January 2022, he was appointed by President Duterte as one of the commissioners of the Presidential Anti-Corruption Commission (PACC).

He is also serves as the national president of the Philippine Development Movement. He is also the founding president of Partido Federal ng Pilipinas.

== Political career ==
He attempted to ran for councilor of Bacolod in the 2010 local elections but lost.

In 2024, Hinlo was elected by Duterte's Partido Demokratiko Pilipino as its Deputy Secretary General for Visayas. He was tapped as one of the party's senatorial candidates for the 2025 Senate election. While campaigning, there are some instances that he led a rally in his hometown in Bacolod. However, he lost, placing 26th in the official results.

== Personal life ==
He is married to Diane Jane Villanueva.
