= List of political parties in the Philippines =

There are many and diverse political parties in the Philippines. Most party membership consists primarily of political figures and leaders, with little or no grassroots membership.

The Philippines operates under a multi-party system, characterized by numerous political parties. Due to the absence of sustaining memberships and the necessity for coalition governments, parties often experience a rise-and-fall dynamic.

There are three types of parties in the Philippines. These are: (a) major parties, which typically correspond to traditional political parties; (b) minor parties or party-list organizations, which rely on the party-list system to win Congressional seats; and (c) regional or provincial parties, which correspond to region-wide or province-wide organizations, respectively.

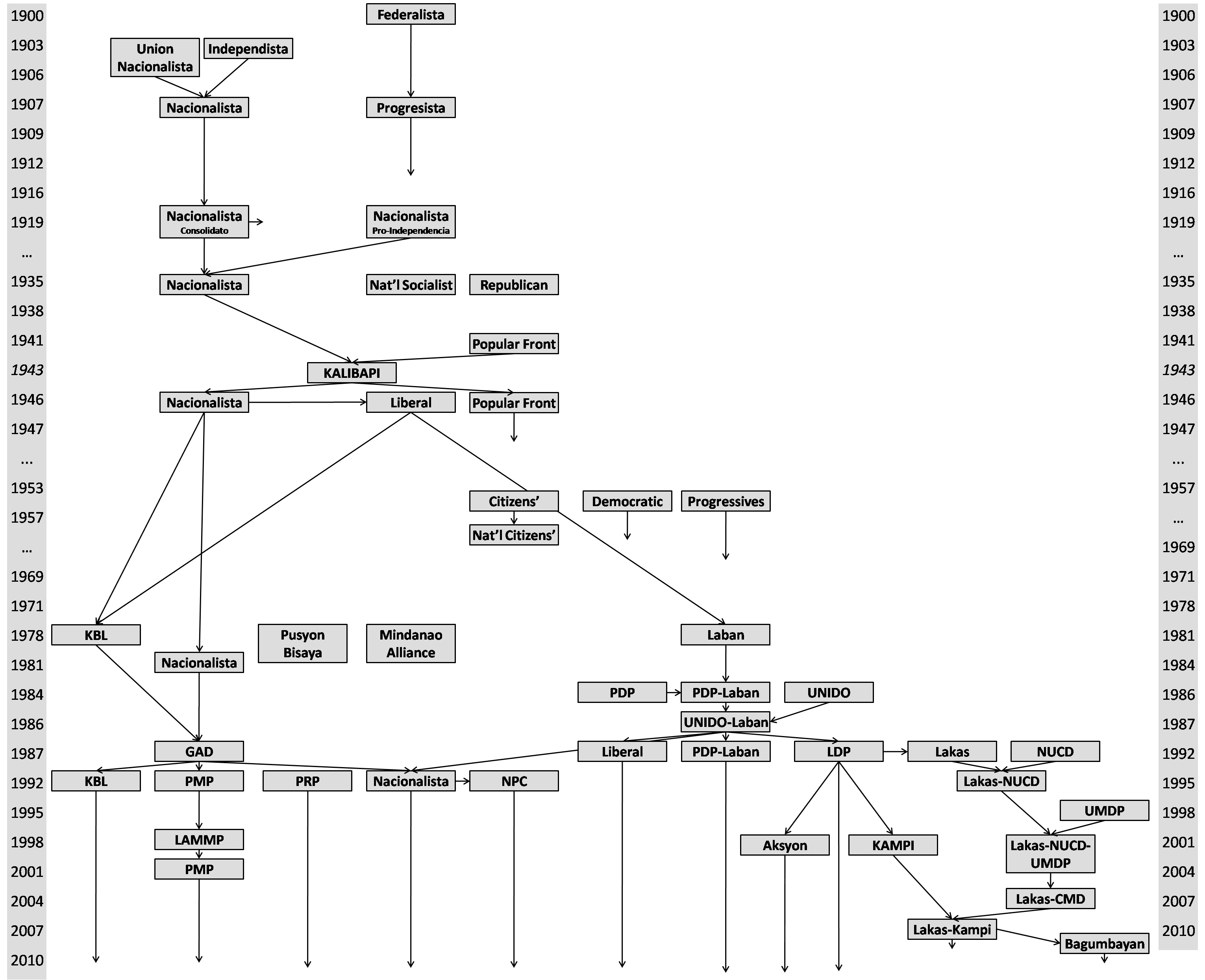
Evolution of political parties.

== National parties in office ==
=== Major parties ===
Party	Abbr.	National coalition	Chairperson	President	Founded	Position	Ideology	Congress of the Philippines		Governors
Party	Abbr.	National coalition	Chairperson	President	Founded	Position	Ideology	Senate	House	Governors
Partido Federal ng Pilipinas	PFP	Alyansa	Bongbong Marcos	Reynaldo Tamayo Jr.	2018	Big-tent	Federalism	0 / 24	50 / 318	27 / 82
Lakas–Christian Muslim Democrats	Lakas/Lakas–CMD	Alyansa	Bong Revilla	Martin Romualdez	2008 (1991)	Centre-right	Christian democracy Islamic democracy	1 / 24	76 / 318	14 / 82
National Unity Party	NUP	Alyansa	Ronaldo Puno	Luis Raymund Villafuerte	2011	Centre-right	Social conservatism	0 / 24	56 / 318	10 / 82
Nationalist People's Coalition	NPC	Alyansa	Tito Sotto	Jack Duavit	1992	Centre-right	Conservatism	6 / 24	34 / 318	8 / 82
Nacionalista Party	NP	Alyansa	Cynthia Villar	Manny Villar	1907	Centre-right to Right-wing	National Conservatism; Filipino nationalismRight-wing populism	4 / 24	18 / 318	11 / 82
Liberal Party	Liberal/LP	KiBam	Kiko Pangilinan	Erin Tañada	1946	Centre to Centre-left	Liberalism	1 / 24	6 / 318	1 / 82
Partido Demokratiko Pilipino-Lakas ng Bayan	PDP-Laban	DuterTen	Rodrigo Duterte	Sebastian Duterte	1982	Syncretic	Dutertism; Populism	3 / 24	1 / 318	5 / 82

=== Other parties represented in Congress ===
Party	Abbr.	National coalition	Chairperson	President	Founded	Position	Ideology	Congress of the Philippines		Governors
Party	Abbr.	National coalition	Chairperson	President	Founded	Position	Ideology	Senate seats	House seats	Governors
Akbayan Citizens' Action Party	Akbayan	KiBam	Mylene Hega	Rafaela David	1998	Centre-left to Left-wing	Progressivism; Social democracy Democratic socialism	1 / 24	3 / 318	0 / 82
Laban ng Demokratikong Pilipino	LDP	–	Sonny Angara	–	1988	Centre-right	Fiscal Conservatism; Economic liberalism; Conservative liberalism	0 / 24	1 / 318	1 / 82
Pwersa ng Masang Pilipino	PMP	–	Vacant	Joseph Estrada	1991	Big-tent	Populism	1 / 24	0 / 318	0 / 82
Aksyon Demokratiko	Aksyon	–	Ernesto Ramel Jr.	Isko Moreno	1997	Centre to Centre-left	Liberal democracy Progressivism	0 / 24	0 / 318	1 / 82
United Nationalist Alliance	UNA	–	Nancy Binay	Jejomar Binay	2012	Centre-right	Populism; Paternalistic conservatism	0 / 24	0 / 318	0 / 82
People's Reform Party	PRP	–	Vacant	Narciso Santiago Jr.	1991	Centre-left	Reformism	0 / 24	0 / 318	0 / 82
Centrist Democratic Party of the Philippines	CDP	–	Lito Monico Lorenzana	Rufus Rodriguez	2010	Centre-right	Christian democracy Federalism	0 / 24	1 / 318	0 / 82
Katipunan ng Nagkakaisang Pilipino	KNP	KiBam	Bam Aquino	Kerby Salazar	2020	Centre	Youth empowerment Liberalism	1 / 24	0 / 318	0 / 82

==== Party-lists represented in Congress ====
These parties won more than 2% of the vote. For the complete list, see 2025 Philippine House of Representatives election (party-list).

Party	Abbr.	Ideology/sector	House party-list seats
Akbayan Citizens' Action Party	Akbayan	Multi-sectoral	3 / 63
Tingog Sinirangan	Tingog	Leyte regionalism	3 / 63
4Ps Partylist	4Ps		2 / 63
ACT-CIS Partylist	ACT-CIS	Counterterrorism	2 / 63
Ako Bicol	AKB	Bicol regionalism	2 / 63

== Minor parties ==
These are parties that used to have members in Congress or parties with few or no seats in government.

Party	Abbr.	Leader	Position	Ideology
Akay National Political Party	AKAY	Sol Aragones	Centre-left to Centre	Social democracy Progressivism; Welfarism
Alliance for Barangay Concerns	ABC	James Marty Lim	Single-issue	Localism
Ang Kapatiran	KPTRAN	Reynaldo Pacheco	Centre-right to Right-wing	Conservatism Christian democracy Social conservatism
Bagumbayan–Volunteers for a New Philippines	BVNP	Richard Gordon	Centre-right	Voluntarism
Bangon Pilipinas	BP	Eddie Villanueva	Economics: Centre-left Social: Centre-right	Christian left
Bigkis Pinoy Movement	BIGKIS	Amando Ocampo	Single-issue	Poverty alleviation
Democratic Party of the Philippines	DPP	Baldomero Falcone	Centre-right	Popular democracy
Katipunan ng Demokratikong Pilipino	KDP	Carlos Enrique G. Valdes III	Far-right	Economic nationalism Neo-nationalism Realism Ultranationalism
Katipunan ng Kamalayang Kayumanggi	KTPNAN	Faisal Mangondato	Centre-right	Federalism
Kilusang Bagong Lipunan	KBL	Efren Rafanan Sr.	Right-wing	Conservatism Anti-communism Economic nationalism
Laban para sa Kapayapaan, Katarungan at Kaunlaran	KKK	Christy Lim-Raymundo	Single-issue	Localism
Ladlad	LADLAD	Danton Remoto	Single-issue	LGBTQ interests Civil libertarianism
Partido Demokratiko Sosyalista ng Pilipinas	PDSP	Norberto Gonzales	Centre-left	Democratic socialism Social democracy Grassroots democracy
Partido Komunista ng Pilipinas-1930	PKP-1930	Eduardo Landayan	Far-left	Communism; Marxism–Leninism
Partido Lakas ng Masa	PLM	Leody de Guzman	Far-left to Left-wing	Socialism Marxism–Leninism
Partido para sa Demokratikong Reporma	PDR	Pantaleon Alvarez	Centre to Centre-right	Liberal conservatism
Pederalismo ng Dugong Dakilang Samahan	PDDS	Greco Belgica	Centre-right	Dutertism; Federalism Populism
Labor Party Philippines	WPP	Melchor Chavez	Centre-left	Laboriousm
Medical Cannabis Party	MEDCANN	Henrie Enaje	Single-issue	Cannabis rights
Partido Pilipino sa Pagbabago	PPP	Leonardo Fernandez	Centre-right to Far-left	Federalism Filipino nationalism
People's Progressive Humanist Liberal Party	PolPHIL	Benjamin Acorda Jr.	Centre-left	Humanism Progressivism Secular humanism Social liberalism
Philippine Green Republican Party	PGRP	Felix Cantal	Centre-left	Green politics
Progressive Movement for the Devolution of Initiatives	PROMDI	Mariano Osmeña	Centre	Devolution; Energy independence
Reform PH - People's Party	Reform PH	James Layug	Centre-right	Reformism; Economic liberalism
Sanlakas	SANLAKAS	Max Abalos	Left-wing	Progressivism Socialism

== Regional and local parties ==
=== Luzon ===
Name	Abbr.	Location	Leader	Notes
One Muntinlupa	1Munti	Muntinlupa	Ruffy Biazon	
Makatizens United Party	MKTZNU	Makati	Abby Binay	
Move Makati		Makati	Romulo de Guzman	
Abante Pangasinan-Ilokano Party	API	Pangasinan	Amado Espino Jr.	
Malay Democrats of the Philippines	MDP	Metro Manila	Bayan Dela Cruz	affiliated with National Economic Protectionism Association
Kabalikat ng Bayan sa Kaunlaran	KABAKA	Manila's 5th and 6th congressional districts	Amado Bagatsing	
Philippine Christian Nationalist Party	PCNP	Quezon City	Andres Genito	
Serbisyo sa Bayan Party	SBP	Quezon City	Joy Belmonte	formerly affiliated with Hugpong ng Pagbabago
Retailers Party		Manila's 3rd congressional district	Estelito Mendoza	
Liping Kalookan		Caloocan	Macario Asistio	formerly Grand Kalookan Coalition
Katipunan ng Bagong Caloocan	KABACA	Caloocan	Gwendolyn Emnace	affiliated with Aksyon Demokratiko
Kasangga ng Bayan, Tao, Kalikasan at Kaunlaran	KABATAK	Parañaque	Joey Marquez	
Kilusang Diwa ng Taguig	KDT	Taguig	Dante Tinga	affiliated with Liberal Party and National Unity Party
Caloocan Team for Action and Progress	CATAPAT	Caloocan	Bonifacio Alis	
Partido Tapat		Taguig and Pateros	Edmundo de Borja	also known as Taguig-Pateros Action Team
Partido Navoteño	NVTEÑO	Navotas	Toby Tiangco	affiliated with Pwersa ng Masang Pilipino and United Nationalist Alliance
Reform Caloocan Party		Caloocan	Russel Ramirez	
United Citizens of Caloocan Party	UCCP	Caloocan	Nilo Divina	
Partido Magdiwang		San Juan	Joseph Victor Ejercito	affiliated with Pwersa ng Masang Pilipino
Lingkod ng Mamamayan ng Valenzuela City	LINKOD	Valenzuela	Magi Gunigundo	
Kapanalig at Kambilan ding Memalen Pampanga	KAMBILAN	Pampanga and Angeles City	Dennis G. Pineda	affiliated with Nationalist People's Coalition and National Unity Party
Lingkod Bayan-Sulong Taguig Coalition	LINGKOD TAGUIG	Taguig	Angelito Reyes	
Asenso Manileño	AMM	Manila	Honey Lacuna	affiliated with Lakas–CMD
Kapayapaan, Kaunlaran at Katarungan	KKK	Manila	Christy Lim-Raymundo	affiliated with Akbayan
Movement for Economic Transformation & Righteous Opportunities	METRO	Metro Manila	Rodolfo John O. Teope	
Samahang Kaagapay ng Agilang Pilipino	AGILA	Pasig City and Parañaque	Josef Maganduga	
Giting ng Pasig		Pasig	Vico Sotto	
United Benguet Party	UBP	Benguet	Eric Yap	
Bileg Ti La Union		La Union	Joaquin L. Ortega	
Bileg Ti Ilocano	BILEG	Ilocos Sur	Chavit Singson	
Biskeg na Pangasinan Party	BISKEG	Pangasinan	Oscar Lambino	affiliated with Lakas-CMD
Democratic Tabula Tua		Cagayan	Delfin Telan Ting	affiliated with Lakas-CMD
Buklod Capampangan		Pampanga and Angeles City	Estelito Mendoza	
Lapiang Bagong Lakas ng Nueva Ecija	BALANE	Nueva Ecija	Tomas Joson III	affiliated with Nationalist People's Coalition and PDP
Lingap Lugud Capampangan Party		Pampanga and Angeles City	Lito Lapid	affiliated with Lakas–CMD
Pinag-isang Lakas Tungo sa Pagbabago	PINATUBO	Zambales and Olongapo	Philip Camara	
Sama Sama Tarlac	SST	Tarlac	Christian Yap	affiliated with Nationalist People's Coalition
Democratic Alliance	DA	Central Luzon	Romeo Taruc	
Partido del Pilar		Bulacan	Manuel G. Roxas	affiliated with Liberal Party
Nagkakaisang Partido ng mga Kapampangan	NPK	Pampanga	Zenaida Cruz-Ducut	affiliated with Nationalist People's Coalition
Unang Sigaw-Partido ng Pagbabago	USPP	Nueva Ecija	Aurelio Umali	affiliated with Lakas–CMD
Kalapian ng mga Kaibigan ng Kaunlaran-Bayan ng Hagonoy	LAPIANG K	Hagonoy, Bulacan	Angel Cruz, Jr.	
Partido Malolenyo	PM	Malolos, Bulacan	Carolina Mangawang	
Sulong Zambales Party	SZP	Zambales	Hermogenes Ebdane (chairman); Jun Omar Ebdane (President)	affiliated with Labor Party Philippines
Partido ABE Kapampangan	PAK/ABE	Angeles City, Pampanga	Edgardo Pamintuan Sr. (chairman); Alex Cauguiran (president)	Founded March 28, 2012.
Partido Balikatan ng Bataan	BALIKATAN	Bataan	Enrique Garcia, Jr.	affiliated with National Unity Party
Partido Magdalo		Cavite	Jonvic Remulla	affiliated with Nacionalista Party, United Nationalist Alliance, Pwersa ng Masang Pilipino and Partido Federal ng Pilipinas
Forward with Vitality for Reforms-Sigaw ng Kabite	FVR-Sigaw	Cavite	Franco Loyola	
Quezon Nationalist Democratic Party	QNDP	Quezon and Lucena	Bienvenido Marquez, Jr.	
Stand Up Quezon	Stan Q	Quezon	Angelina Tan	affiliated with Nationalist People's Coalition
Pangkat Laguna		Laguna	Marito Mendoza	
Partido Dimasalang		Laguna	Teresita Lazaro	affiliated with Lakas–CMD
Partido Batangueño		Batangas	Franklin Tabaquin, Jr.	
Partido ng Masang Batangueno	PMB	Batangas	Nicanor Briones	
Union of Nationalist Democratic Filipino Organization	UNIDO	Region 4A	Vacant	
One Batangas Movement	One Batangas	Batangas	Vilma Santos-Recto	affiliated with Nacionalista Party
Partido Bagong San Pablo		San Pablo, Laguna	Arsenio Escuderro, Jr.	
People's Alliance Development of Romblon	PADER	Romblon	Natalio Beltran, Jr.	
People's Empowerment sa Lungsod Agham	PELA	Muñoz, Nueva Ecija	Baby Armi L. Alvarez	
Partido Pagbabago ng Palawan	PPP	Palawan	Jose Alvarez	affiliated with Hugpong ng Pagbabago
Sulong Palawan Party	SPP	Palawan and Puerto Princesa	Victorino Dennis Socrates	
Mindoro Sandugo Para sa Kaunlaran	SANDUGO	Oriental Mindoro	Agustin Cusi	
Bicol Saro		Bicol Region	Ma. Corazon Imperial	
Catanduanes Alliance for Reform and Democracy	CARD	Catanduanes	Dexter Francisco	
Alliance of Bicolnon Party	ABP-BICOLNON	Bicol Region	Enrique Olonan	
Ako Bicol	AKB	Bicol Region	Elizaldy Co	

=== Visayas ===
Name	Abbr.	Location	Leader	Notes
Panaghiusa	PANAGHIUSA	Cebu and Cebu City	Jose Daluz III	
Paglaum Party		Negros Occidental	Alfredo Montelibano, Jr.	affiliated with Nacionalista Party
Kusog Han Eastern Samar		Eastern Samar	Jaime Opinion	
People's Progressive Alliance for Peace and Good Government Towards Alleviation of Poverty and Social Advancement	Partido PAGASA	Western Visayas	Rene Juaneza	
Pusyon Pilipino		Central Visayas	Casimiro Madarang, Jr.	
Abante Anak Bisaya		Central Visayas	Geraldo Carillo	
United Negros Alliance	UNA	Negros Occidental	Alfredo Marañon III	formerly affiliated with Lakas–CMD, Nationalist People's Coalition and PDP-Laban with now National Unity Party
Barug Alang sa Kauswagan ug Demokrasya	BAKUD	Cebu's 5th congressional district	Ramon Durano III	affiliated with Nationalist People's Coalition
Alayon Alang sa Kalambu-an ng Kalinaw	ALAYON	Central Visayas	Eduardo Gullas	
Katig-buan Nortehanon		Northern Samar	Emil Ong	
Partido Pundok Biliranon		Biliran	Danilo Parilla	
Aton Tamdon Utod Negros-anon	ATUN	Negros Occidental	Rafael Coscolluela	
Uswag Ilonggo	USWAG Ilonggo	Iloilo	Jerry Treñas	
Kugi Uswag Sugbo	KUSUG	Cebu City	Raymond Alvin Garcia	affiliated with Partido Federal ng Pilipinas (2024-present), previously with PDP-Laban (2016-24) and UNA (2012-16)
Ugyon		Visayas	Franklin Drilon	affiliated with Liberal Party
Timawa		Iloilo City	Rona Anape-Ganzon	affiliated with United Nationalist Alliance
United Guardians Party	UGP	Western Visayas and Central Visayas	Clodualdo P. Dedicatoria	
Economic Development and Social Advancement	EDSA	Central Visayas	Melchor Cubillo	
Democracy of the Independent Liberal Conservative Party	DILC	Liloan, Cebu	Vincent Frasco	
Ugyon Kita Capiz	UK CAPIZ	Capiz	Fredenil Castro	affiliated with United Nationalist Alliance
One Capiz		Capiz	Fredenil Castro	affiliated with Lakas–CMD and Liberal Party
One Cebu	1CEBU	Cebu	Gwendolyn Garcia	
Bando Osmeña - Pundok Kauswagan	BOPK	Cebu City	Tomas Osmeña	affiliated with the Liberal Party (since 2024, 2009–2018), previously affiliated with Laban ng Demokratikong Pilipino (2018–2024), Lakas–CMD (2003–2009) and PROMDI (1997–2003)
Partido Barug	BARUG	Cebu City	Michael Rama	affiliated with PDP

=== Mindanao ===
Name	Abbr.	Location	Leader	Notes
Asenso Iliganon Party	AIP	Iligan City	Frederick Siao	
Hugpong ng Pagbabago	HNP	Davao Region	Sara Duterte	affiliated with PDP
Hugpong sa Tawong Lungsod	HTL	Davao City	Paolo Duterte	affiliated with PDP
Christian Muslim Independent Party	CMIP	Zamboanga del Norte	Tiburcio Pasquil	
Aggrupation of Parties for Prosperity	APP	Zamboanga del Norte	Seth Frederick Jalosjos	affiliated with Hugpong ng Pagbabago
Sarangani Reconciliation and Reformation Organization	SARRO	Sarangani	Priscilla Chiongbian	affiliated with Lakas-CMD
Islamic Party of the Philippines	IPP	Mindanao	Ebrahim Abdurrahman	
Ompia Party	OMPIA	Mindanao	Mahid Mutilan	
Democratic Alliance of Mindanaoans for Good Government	DAMAGO	Davao Region and Soccsksargen	Fernando Toquillo	
Muslim Reform Party	MRP	Lanao del Norte and Lanao del Sur	Kamar Mindalano	
Ummah Party		Lanao del Norte, Lanao del Sur and Iligan	Former Ambassador Ameroddin M. Sarangani "Abu Mohammad"	
Compostela Valley Rainbow Alliance	CORAL	Davao de Oro	Rogelio Sarmiento	
Cotabato United People's Movement		Cotabato	Emmanuel Piñol	
United Lanao Alliance for Development	UNLAD	Lanao del Norte	Mohamad Khalid Dimaporo	affiliated with Lakas–CMD
Lanao People's Party		Lanao del Sur	Casan Macabanding	
Serbisyong Inklusibo–Alyansang Progresibo	SIAP	Bangsamoro	Mamintal Adiong Jr.	
Padajon Surigao	PS	Surigao del Norte	Francisco Matugas	affiliated with Lakas-CMD
People's Champ Movement	PCM	General Santos and Sarangani	Manny Pacquiao	affiliated with PROMDI
Citizens Call for Action Party of Zamboanga City	CCA	Zamboanga City	Susan de los Reyes	
Adelante Zamboanga Party	AZAP	Zamboanga City	Jose Lobregat	
Aksyon Magsasaka-Partido ng Tinig ng Masa	AKMA-PTM	Soccsksargen	Ali Sangki	
Achievers with Integrity Movement	AIM	South Cotabato	Adelbert Antonino	
Padayon Pilipino	PADAYON	Cagayan de Oro	Vicente Emano	affiliated with Pwersa ng Masang Pilipino
Partido Prosperidad y Amor Para na Zamboanga	PAZ	Zamboanga City	Beng Climaco	affiliated with Liberal Party
People's Consultative (Mushawara) Party		Bangsamoro, Lanao del Norte and Zamboanga del Sur	Basher Caluato Edris	
Bukidnon Paglaum	BPP	Bukidnon	Jose Maria Zubiri Jr.	
BARMM Grand Coalition	BGC	Bangsamoro	Suharto Mangudadatu	
United Bangsamoro Justice Party	UBJP	Bangsamoro	Murad Ibrahim	
Bangsamoro Party	BaPa	Bangsamoro	Muslimin Sema	
Bangsamoro Federalist Party	BFP	Bangsamoro	Tomanda Antok	
Bangsamoro Peoples Party	BPP	Bangsamoro	Mujiv Hataman	
Al Ittihad–UKB Party	Al Ittihad–UKB	Bangsamoro	Suharto Mangudadatu	
Raayat Democratic Party	RDP	Bangsamoro	Jose Lorena	
Progresibong Bangsamoro Party	PRO Bangsamoro	Bangsamoro	Don Mustapha Loong	
Salaam Party		Bangsamoro	Abdusakur Mahail Tan	
Indigenous People's Democratic Party	IPDP	Bangsamoro	Froilyn Mendoza	
Mahardika Party		Bangsamoro	Abdulkarim Misuari; Nurredha Misuari	
Basilan Unity Party	BUP	Basilan	Mujiv Hataman; Sitti Djalia Turabin-Hataman	
Tawi-Tawi One Party	TOP	Tawi-Tawi	Yshmael Sali	
United Iligan Party	UIP	Iligan City	Celso Regencia	

== Not registered with the government ==
These are national parties that are not registered with the Commission on Elections:

Party	Abbr.	Founded	Leader	Ideology
Communist Party of the Philippines; Partido Komunista ng Pilipinas	CPP; PKP	December 26, 1968	vacant	Communism; Marxism–Leninism–Maoism; National Democracy (Philippines)
Marxista-Leninistang Partido ng Pilipinas; Marxist–Leninist Party of the Philippines	MLPP	1998	Caridad Magpantay	Communism; Marxism–Leninism
Rebolusyonaryong Partido ng Manggagagawa – Pilipinas; Revolutionary Workers' Party of the Philippines	RPM-P	1995	Arturo Tabara; Nilo dela Cruz	Communism; Marxism–Leninism

== Other not registered parties ==
These are the parties that also not historically or politically relevant, but still part of the Philippine political landscape

Party	Abbr.	Founded	Leader	Ideology
Constitutional Reform & Rectification for Economic Competitiveness & Transformation	CoRRECT Movement	2010	Orion Perez Dumdum	Federalism; Parliamentarism; Economic liberalism
Philippine Social Conservative Movement	PSCM	2020	Atty. JM B. Estoque	Social Conservatism; Filipino Nationalism
Conservatives of the Philippines	COP	2020		Conservatism; Filipino Nationalism; Liberal Conservatism
Kilusang Pilipinismo	KP	July 7, 1982	Nilo Tayag	Filipino Nationalism; Anti-Communism; Anti-elitism; Authoritarianism; Marcosism
Kayumanggi Philippines		2025	Nikka Gaddi	Progressivism; Reformism; Filipino Nationalism; Left-wing Nationalism
Kanan Party	KP	2019	vacant	Social Conservatism; Reactionism; Christian Right; Right-wing Populism; Filipino Nationalism; Zionism; Anti-Communism
New Social Contract	NSC	2025	Josiah Maraon	Liberalism; Centrism
Philippine National Front	PNF	December 21, 2009	vacant	Nazism; Fascism; Filipino nationalism Ultranationalism; Anti-Communism
Itim Na Araw	INA	2025	vacant	Nazism; Filipino Nationalism; Christian Fascism
Kilusang Setyembre Bente Uno	KS21, KSBU	2025	vacant	Anti-Corruption
Anti Communist Action - Philippines	ACT - Philippines	2026	vacant	Anti-Communism
Alliance for Nationalism and Democracy	ANAD	February 14, 2002	Jun Alcover Jr.	Filipino Nationalism; Anti-Communism; Democracy
Socialism with Filipino Characteristics		December 6, 2025	Jan Writer	Socialism; Filipino Nationalism; Pragmatism; Meritocracy; Collectivism; Socialism with Chinese Characteristics
Labors Party of the Philippines; Partido Uring Manggagawa ng Pilipinas	LPP; PUMP	October; 21, 2025	Marc Lourich Mallare	Communism; Marxism-Leninism; Democratic Socialism; Pragmatism; Nationalism; Revisionism; Anti Maoism
Libertarian Movement PH; Liberty and Innovation through Free Market Economy	LIFE	2020	vacant	Libertarianism; Anarcho-Capitalism; Cultural liberalism Pro -Javier Milei
Green Party of the Philippines	GPP-KALIKASAN MUNA		David D. D'Angelo	Green politics
Philippine Falangist Front	PFF	2024	N. Villamor	Falangism; Fascism; National Catholicism; Syndicalism; Third Position
Kapatirang Amangbayan	KA, KA44	November 22, 2022	Emmanuel Alfonso	Ultranationalism; Fascism; Third Position; Filipino Nationalism; Amangbayan Thought; Anti-Capitalism; Anti-Communism
Lapiang Sakdalista ng Kabataan	LSK, LSK XXIV	August 2024	vacant	Sakdalista; Fascism Active Club; Third Position; Anti-Capitalism; Anti-Communism
MAKAKALIKASAN; Nature Party Philippines	MAKAKALIKASAN		Orlando Ravanera	Deep Communitarian Ecologism
Philippine Libertarian Party	PHILIPA		Julius Apud (interim chairman)	Right-libertarianism
Koalisyong Katoliko Kristiyano	KKK	2015	Rizalito David	Christian democracy
Philippine Reformation Movement	PRM	2025	Artlee Dilema	Reformism; Social liberalism Social democracy Progressivism; Secularism; Federalism; Parliamentarism
Bukluran sa Ikauunlad ng Sosyalistang Isip at Gawa	BISIG	1986	Ronald Llamas; Francisco Nemenzo Jr.	Democratic Socialism
Partido Sosyalista	PS	2023	vacant	Democratic Socialism; Progressivism
Partido ng Manggagawang Pilipino – Pinagsanib; Filipino Workers Party	PMP-Pinagsanib		Patricio Ramirez	Syndicalism
National People's Socialist Party	NPSP		Al-sulkry M. Abdullatif	Socialism; Nationalism

== Electoral coalitions ==
- Alyansa ng Pag-Asa
- Coalition for Change
- Koalisyon ng Daang Matuwid (KDM)
- Koalisyon ng Katapatan at Karanasan sa Kinabukasan (K-4)
- Koalisyon ng Nagkakaisang Pilipino (KNP)
- Koalisyong Pambansa
- Otso Diretso
- PDP–Lakas Coalition (PDP–LnB)
- People Power Coalition (PPC)
- Puwersa ng Masa (PnM)
- Rainbow Coalition
- Sunshine Coalition
- Team PNoy
- Together Everybody Achieves More Unity (TEAM Unity)
- UniTeam

=== Major coalitions ===
Election year	Administration	Opposition	Result	Outcome
1978	KBL	LABAN	KBL win	LABAN failed to win seats in the Batasang Pambansa.
1984	KBL	UNIDO	KBL win	While UNIDO made gains in the Batasan following the Assassination of Ninoy Aquino, the KBL retained its majority.
In the 1986 presidential election, Marcos was declared winner but was overthrown at the People Power Revolution. His supporters were forced into opposition.
1987	UNIDO	GAD	UNIDO win	UNIDO broke up and the Marcos loyalists coalesced with the other parties.
1992	Laban	Lakas	Lakas win	While the LDP (then known as Laban) won a majority in the Senate and the House, most would defect to the nascent Lakas–NUCD of the new president.
1992	Laban	Koalisyong Pambansa	Lakas win	While the LDP (then known as Laban) won a majority in the Senate and the House, most would defect to the nascent Lakas–NUCD of the new president.
1992	Laban	NPC	Lakas win	While the LDP (then known as Laban) won a majority in the Senate and the House, most would defect to the nascent Lakas–NUCD of the new president.
1992	Laban	PRP	Lakas win	While the LDP (then known as Laban) won a majority in the Senate and the House, most would defect to the nascent Lakas–NUCD of the new president.
1995	Lakas–Laban	NPC	Lakas–Laban win	Lakas still the dominant House party while Laban remains dominant Senate party. There are instances in the House that there are multiple party affiliations beside of either Lakas or Laban, with a 25 seats won by "Lakas–Laban" ballot-labeled House members
1998	Lakas–NUCD–UMDP	LAMMP	LAMMP win	The incumbent coalition would be defeated by the LAMMP, and its members would defect to the new administration coalition.
Estrada was overthrown at the Second EDSA Revolution; his supporters were forced into opposition.
2001	People Power Coalition	Puwersa ng Masa	PPC win	Newly installed president Gloria Macapagal Arroyo (Lakas–NUCD) led the PPC, which won.
2004	K4	KNP	K4 win	Incumbent president Arroyo was able to secure re-election, and her coalition won.
2004	K4	Alyansa ng Pag-asa	K4 win	Incumbent president Arroyo was able to secure re-election, and her coalition won.
2007	TEAM Unity	Genuine Opposition	GO win	The Genuine Opposition would win the majority of seats in the Senate, while TEAM Unity retained control of the House.
2010	Lakas–Kampi	Liberal	Liberal win	Benigno Aquino III (Liberal) defeated the incumbent and other opposition forces to lead the government under his party.
2010	Lakas–Kampi	Nacionalista	Liberal win	Benigno Aquino III (Liberal) defeated the incumbent and other opposition forces to lead the government under his party.
2010	Lakas–Kampi	PMP	Liberal win	Benigno Aquino III (Liberal) defeated the incumbent and other opposition forces to lead the government under his party.
2013	Team PNoy	UNA	Team PNoy win	Vice President Jejomar Binay, along with Estrada, established UNA as the main opposition alliance. Team PNoy won a majority of seats in the Senate, taking nine seats against UNA's three.
2016	Koalisyon ng Daang Matuwid	Coalition for Change	Coalition for Change win	The incumbent's Koalisyon ng Daang Matuwid was defeated and became the opposition as Rodrigo Duterte (PDP–Laban) won the presidential election, establishing the Coalition for Change as the administration coalition.
2016	Koalisyon ng Daang Matuwid	UNA	Coalition for Change win	The incumbent's Koalisyon ng Daang Matuwid was defeated and became the opposition as Rodrigo Duterte (PDP–Laban) won the presidential election, establishing the Coalition for Change as the administration coalition.
2016	Koalisyon ng Daang Matuwid	Partido Galing at Puso	Coalition for Change win	The incumbent's Koalisyon ng Daang Matuwid was defeated and became the opposition as Rodrigo Duterte (PDP–Laban) won the presidential election, establishing the Coalition for Change as the administration coalition.
2019	Hugpong ng Pagbabago	Otso Diretso	HNP win	HNP won overwhelmingly, while Otso Diretso, the main opposition coalition, was not able to win any seat in the Senate.
2022	UniTeam	TRoPa	UniTeam win	The incumbent's coalition was split into two, the Tuloy ang Pagbabago and MP3 Alliance, with the latter becoming part of the opposition. HNP was superseded by the UniTeam of Bongbong Marcos (PFP) who won the presidential election.
2022	UniTeam	MP3	UniTeam win	The incumbent's coalition was split into two, the Tuloy ang Pagbabago and MP3 Alliance, with the latter becoming part of the opposition. HNP was superseded by the UniTeam of Bongbong Marcos (PFP) who won the presidential election.
2022	Tuloy ang Pagbabago	Team Bilis Kilos	UniTeam win	The incumbent's coalition was split into two, the Tuloy ang Pagbabago and MP3 Alliance, with the latter becoming part of the opposition. HNP was superseded by the UniTeam of Bongbong Marcos (PFP) who won the presidential election.
2022	Tuloy ang Pagbabago	Laban ng Masa	UniTeam win	The incumbent's coalition was split into two, the Tuloy ang Pagbabago and MP3 Alliance, with the latter becoming part of the opposition. HNP was superseded by the UniTeam of Bongbong Marcos (PFP) who won the presidential election.
2025	Alyansa para sa Bagong Pilipinas	DuterTen	Alyansa win	Rifts within the UniTeam would result in its split; Marcos would establish Alyansa para sa Bagong Pilipinas. In the Senate, Alyansa would win a plurality of seats, winning six against the DuterTen's three and KiBam's two seats.
2025	Alyansa para sa Bagong Pilipinas	KiBam	Alyansa win	Rifts within the UniTeam would result in its split; Marcos would establish Alyansa para sa Bagong Pilipinas. In the Senate, Alyansa would win a plurality of seats, winning six against the DuterTen's three and KiBam's two seats.
2025	Alyansa para sa Bagong Pilipinas	Oposisyon ng Bayan	Alyansa win	Rifts within the UniTeam would result in its split; Marcos would establish Alyansa para sa Bagong Pilipinas. In the Senate, Alyansa would win a plurality of seats, winning six against the DuterTen's three and KiBam's two seats.

== Historical parties ==
- Allied Party
- Bansang Nagkakaisa sa Diwa at Layunin
- Loyalist Party of the Philippines
- Grand Alliance for Democracy
- Bawat Isa Mahalaga
- Christian Democrats
- Citizens' Party
- Collectivista Party
- Democrata Party
- Democratic Alliance
- Democratic Party
- Federalista Party
- Ganap Party
- Grand Alliance
- Kabalikat ng Malayang Pilipino
- KALIBAPI
- Labor Party
- Lakas ng Bansa
- Lakas ng Bayan
- Lakas–CMD (1991)
- La Liga Filipina
- Lapiang Makabansa
- Lapiang Malaya
- Mindanao Alliance
- Modernist Party
- Movement for Truth, Order and Righteousness
- Nacionalista-Colectivista
- Nacionalista Consolidado
- Nacionalista Democrata Pro-Independencia
- Nacionalista Democratico
- Nacionalista-Unipersonalista
- National Patriotic Party
- National Socialist Party
- Nationalist Citizens' Party
- New Leaf Party
- New Young Philippines
- Partido Bansang Marangal
- Partido Isang Bansa, Isang Diwa
- Partido ng Bansa
- Partido ng Bayan
- Partido'y Makahirap
- People's Party
- People's Progressive Democratic Party
- People's (Veterans) Democratic Movement for Good Government
- Philippine Falange
- Philippine Masses Party
- Philippine Pro-Socialist Party
- Popular Democratic Party
- Popular Front
- Progresista Party
- Progressive Party
- Pusyon Bisaya
- Reformist Party of the Philippines
- Reform Party
- Republican Party
- Sakdal Party
- Social Democratic Party
- Social Justice Society
- Sovereign Citizen Party
- Union for Peace and Progress
- United Rural Community
- United Opposition (UNO)
- Young Philippines

== See also ==
- Politics of the Philippines
- List of political parties by country
