= Gabriel Daza =

Filipino electrical engineer and businessman (1896–1994)

Don, Sir Gabriel Daza KGCR KC*SS
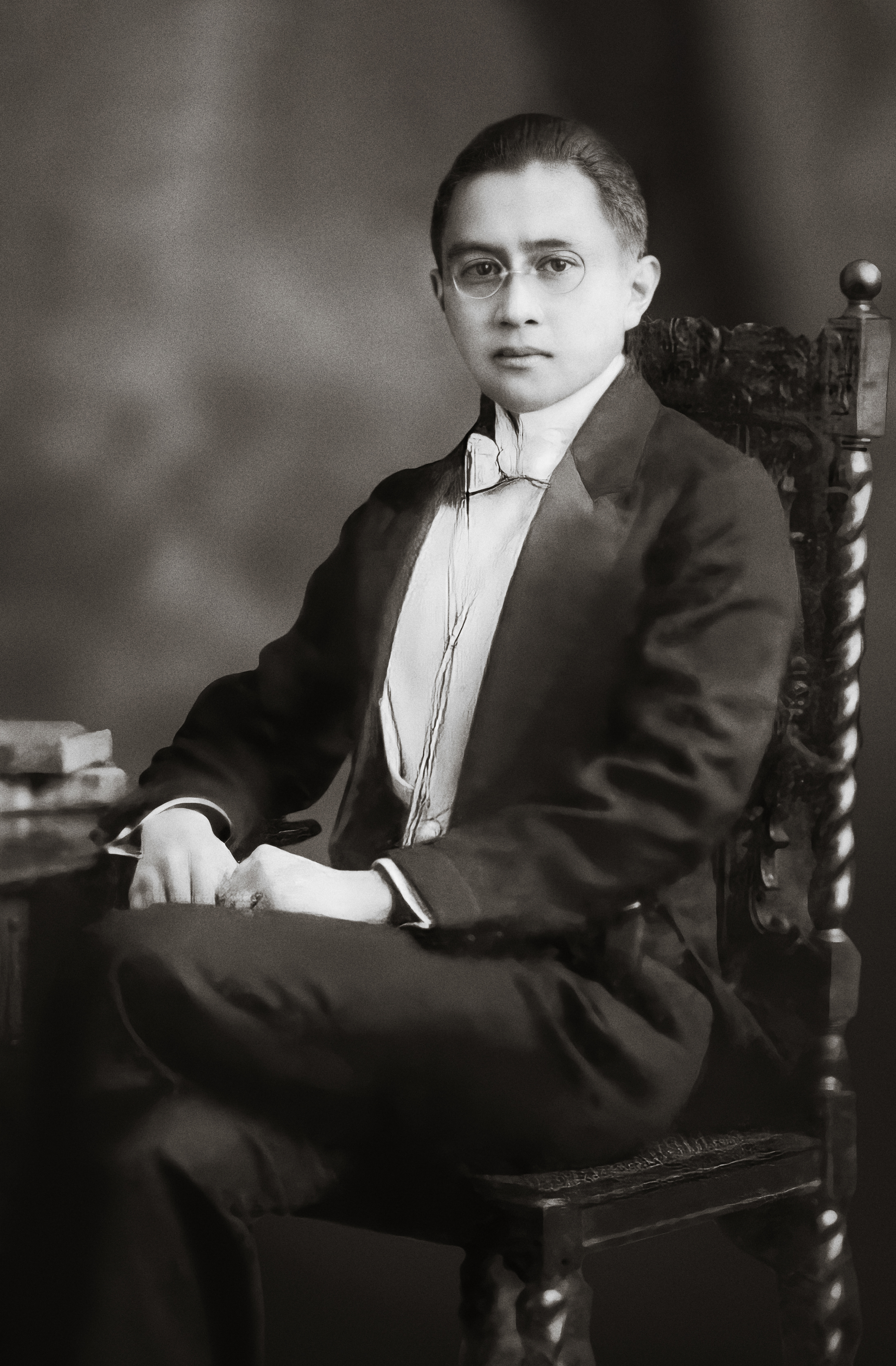
- Daza in 1921

Personal details
- Born: Gabriel Amado Cinco Daza; February 6, 1896 Borongan, Samar, Captaincy General of the Philippines
- Died: May 18, 1994 (aged 98) Quezon City, Philippines
- Spouse: Angeles Ortega (m. 1922)
- Children: 7 See children Beatriz Daza Orendain; Gabriel Daza Jr. David Daza; Rodolfo Daza; Elena Daza Valenzuela; Teresa Daza Baltazar; Francisco Daza
- Parent(s): Eugenio Daza (father); Carolina Cinco (mother)
- Education: Westinghouse Electric Co. Ateneo de Manila
- Profession: Businessman; Electrical Engineer
- Known for: Charter member of the BSP; First Filipino Electrical Engineer; PLDT Co-Founder
- Religion: Roman Catholicism

Military service
- Allegiance: Philippines
- Branch/service: Philippine Army
- Rank: Kapitán (Captain)

Don Gabriel Amando Daza, KGCR, KC*SS (February 6, 1896 – May 18, 1994) was the first Filipino electrical engineer and one of the charter members of the Boy Scouts of the Philippines (BSP). He co-founded the Philippine Long Distance Telephone Company (PLDT), Philippine Telegraph and Telephone Co. (PT&T), Philippine Electric Manufacturing Company (PEMCO), Phelps Dodge Philippines. He was the supervising engineer and assistant general manager of Visayan Electric Company (VECO) and led its expansion out of Cebu City. President and chief scout of the BSP in 1961–68. In 1945, President Osmeña appointed Daza to be a member of the board of directors of the Manila Railroad Company and the Philippine Charity Sweepstakes Office. In 1950, he was vice-chairman of the National Power Corporation and on the board of directors of the Manila Hotel Company. In 1951, Daza was appointed by President Quirino as a founding member of the board of directors of the National Shipyard and Steel Corporation. President and director of the National Economic Protection Agency (NEPA) in 1956.

== Early life ==
Daza was born and raised in Borongan, Eastern Samar, to Don Eugenio Daza and Carolina Cinco. Daza was a principale (noble) through his father, while the social class was slowly dissolved following American colonialism, Daza retained the principale honorific title of Don. Daza was the eldest of 7 siblings: Carlota, Cirilo, Jesus, Rosario, Maria and Juan. Daza was born 3 months before his father left to fight in the Philippine Revolution. In 1907, when Daza was 11, his father became the representative of their region to the First Philippine Legislature. That same year he began studying at Ateneo de Manila. While at Ateneo he would befriend Andrés Soriano Sr. and their junior José Cojuangco In 1914, Daza completed a Bachelor of Arts at the Ateneo de Manila University.

In 1915, he was part of the Philippine delegation to the Panama–Pacific International Exposition. After the exposition, Daza ended up staying in the United States for the next seven years.

While studying engineering in the U.S., Daza picked up "odd jobs" to support himself. These odd jobs at various times included being an elevator boy, messenger, telephone operator, gardener, janitor, clerk, and even a houseboy for the U.S. House of Representatives Philippine Resident Commissioner Jaime C. de Veyra. Daza stated his experience in these odd jobs were the reason he was known for his cleanliness, orderliness, and fondness for nature. Daza's U.S. World War I draft registration card states that he was an American citizen.

== Engineering ==
In 1915, Daza moved to the U.S. to attend Herald's Engineering College in San Francisco, California. While studying he lived at the Hotel Dorchester and worked there as a clerk. Daza then studied at the Bliss Electrical School in Washington, D.C. where he graduated in 1919.

Shortly after, Daza moved to Wilkinsburg, Pennsylvania in the Pittsburgh metropolitan area, where he lodged at the home of a fellow electrical engineer Everett Ashworth who had recently married and moved from Washinghton, New York. Daza worked at the mainplant of Westinghouse Electric and Manufacturing Company in Pittsburgh, Pennsylvania, a company that employed the likes of Nikola Tesla, and studied in the Westinghouse Educational Department. He joined the Pittsburgh Chapter of the Bliss Electrical School Alumni Association. Daza studied in Alexander & Baldwin, New York, to help familiarise himself with engineering methods and practices before working for Catton-Neil Eng. & Machinery Co. Daza received his graduate and post-grad from Westinghouse. While Daza was studying, he taught his Spanish-speaking colleagues what he learned at school, they later "offered him a good-paying job in Argentina" which he declared was "a turning point." He decided "it was time [to] go home and do my share here."

=== Return to the Philippines ===
Our country has to develop, and to achieve this, we need power, electricity.

— Don Gabriel on why he became an electrical engineer, 1991 PERCEPTION

In 1922, Daza worked as an electrical engineer and salesman for Catton-Neill Eng. & Machinery Co a local subsidiary of Westinghouse and was an Associate Member of the American Institute of Electrical Engineers (AIEE). On December 3, 1927, Daza became a full member of the AIEE.

In Cebu City, as early as 1927, Daza was the supervising engineer and assistant general manager of the Visayan Electric Company (VECO), and the assistant general manager of the Visayan Electric Supply Company. Daza led the expansion of VECO out of the Cebu City. In 1929, Daza went to the Philippine Legislature in Manila to develop a new franchise for VECO. In 1931, the Legislature approved a 50-year franchise allowing VECO to expand to: Mandaue, Consolacion, Liloan and Compostela, North of Cebu; and Talisay, Minglanilla, Naga, San Fernando and Danao.

In 1928, Col. Joseph E. Stevenot sought out Daza for his engineering prowess. Together, Daza and Stevenot co-founded the Philippine Long Distance Telephone Company (PLDT). Throughout his career at PLDT Daza filled several positions at various times, including vice president, treasurer, chief financial officer (CFO), public service commissioner, manager of Manila District and acting general commercial manager.

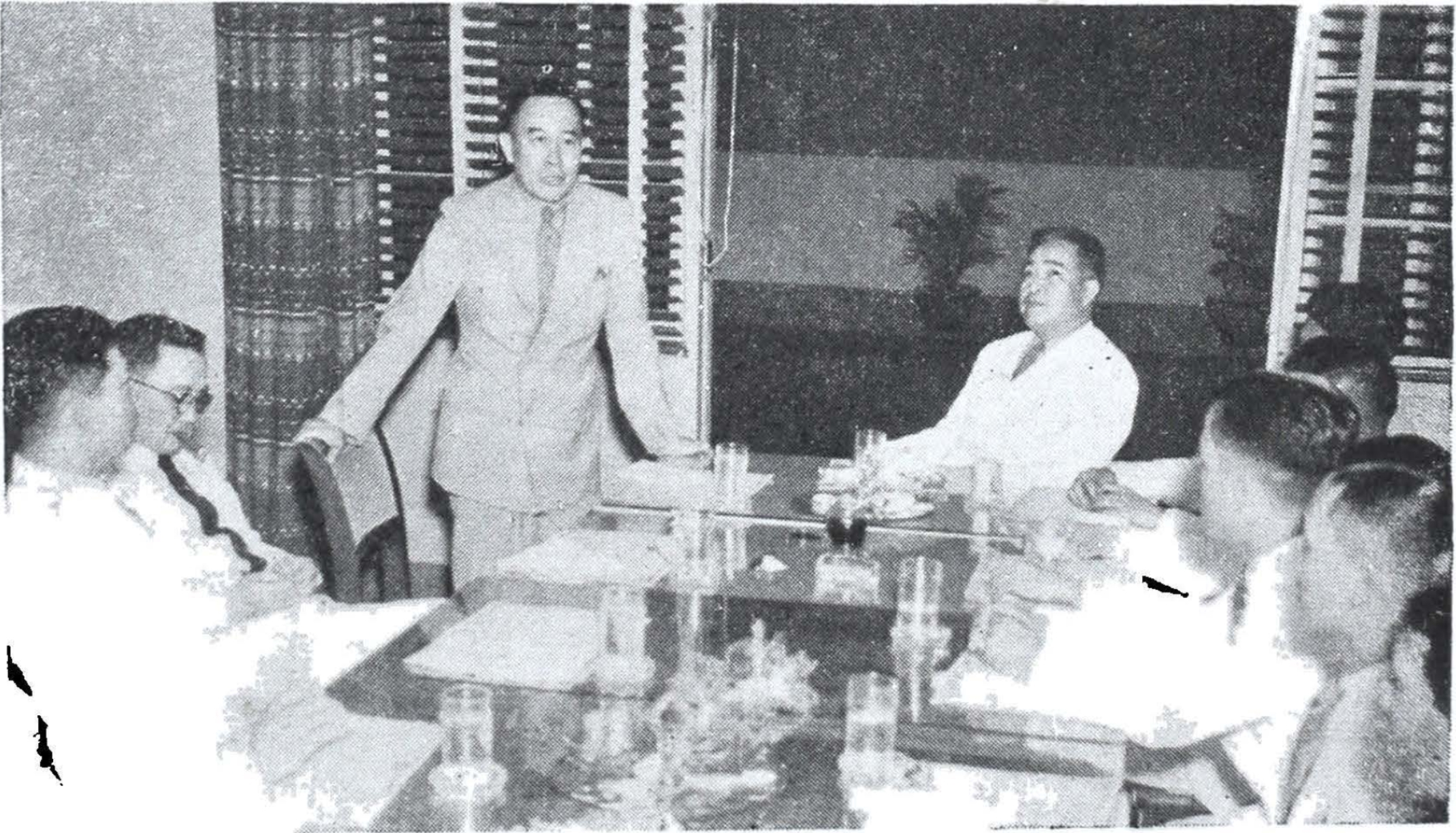
Daza (left) smoking a cigar attending a Signal Corps dinner for Mr. Ledesma's (standing) departure to the U.S. Heading the table is chief of the Signal Corps Lt. Col. Paciano Tangco (right).

From 1930 to 1939, Daza was the Illuminating Engineer of the executive staff, and Electrical Engineer of the Philippine Carnival Association. The association held the Manila Carnival, an American Colonial showcase for Philippine commerce, industry and agriculture. He co-founded the Philippine Electric Manufacturing Company (PEMCO) and Phelps Dodge Philippines. From 1936 to 1937, Daza was the chairman of Illumination Committee for the 33rd International Eucharistic Congress (IEC). In 1937, he was treasurer of the Philippine Association of Mechanical and Electrical Engineers (PAMEE). By 1939, Daza was receiving one of the highest salaries in the Philippines at ₱1,000.

By 1937, Daza had been a consulting electrical engineer for the Philippine Army for some time, he was formally announced to be Captain of the Signal Corps for the Philippine Army on June 15, 1937, under the command of Lt. Col. Paciano Tangco. In 1945, Daza worked with the United States Army Signal Corps (USASC) to survey the extent of the destruction of PLDT's telephone communications infrastructure in Manila. Daza reported that three of PLDT's central exchanges in Santa Cruz, Malate, and Pasay were destroyed by the Japanese.

In June 1947, the Electrical Engineering Law, Republic Act 184, was passed in the Congress of the Philippines and Daza was appointed as the chairman of the Board of Electrical Engineering Examiners that Article 1 Section 2 of the Act established. Due to propriety, as the examiner chairman, Daza issued license number 001 to himself, making himself the first Filipino licensed electrical engineer.

From 1946 to 1951, Daza was the assistant chief examiner and engineering consultant for the US-Philippine War Damage Commission (PWDC). Daza was also the liaison officer for Gen. Douglas MacArthur for the PWDC.

In the late 1940s, under President Elpidio Quirino, Daza was tasked with engineering two hydroelectric dams in the Benguet province along the Agno River. The dams became known as Ambuklao Dam, which was opened in 1956, and Binga Dam, which opened in 1960. Daza would bring his grandson Gabriel "Bong" Daza III when he put up power plants in Marina Cristina, Northern Mindanao; Bunga, Cebu province; and Angat, Bulacan Province.

In 1961, Daza retired as vice-president and treasurer of PLDT. In 1962, he co-founded the Philippine Telegraph and Telephone Co. (PT&T) and served as a member of the board of directors until as late as 1992.

On November 12, 1985, Daza and Quezon City mayor Adelina Santos Rodriguez sponsored the Institute of Integrated Electrical Engineers of the Philippines Inc. (IIEE) Building Cornerstone for a new IIEE Headquarters.

In his life, Daza was honoured with lifetime memberships in three industry societies: the American Institute of Electrical Engineers (AIEE), the Institute of Electrical and Electronics Engineers, and the Integrated Electrical Engineers of the Philippines Inc. (IIEE).

== Boy Scouts ==
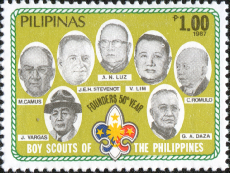
Daza (bottom right) Founders of the Boy Scouts of the Philippines. Stamp for National Boy Scout Movement 50th Anniversary, 28 Oct 1987.

In 1928, Daza registered to be a member of the Cebu Council, Boy Scouts of America. On October 31, 1936, Daza and the other Boy Scouts of the Philippines (BSP) founders officially chartered the BSP in Commonwealth Act No. 111 authorized by President Manuel Quezon. Later, he was appointed as Secretary of the Boy Scout Foundation by Joseph Stevenot and served in the BSP's National Executive Board.

=== Post-World War II ===
Following World War II, out of the seven Charter members, Stevenot and General Vicente Lim were casualties of the war. Arsenio Luz and Manuel Camus were occupied in post-war reconstruction. Jorge Vargas was facing charges for collaboration with the Japanese (later cleared), and General Carlos Romulo was working on the formation and establishment of the United Nations. This left Daza as the sole charter member available to build the fledgling organisation in the aftermath of the war.

As a member of the US-Philippine War Damage Commission (PWDC), Daza acquired a donation for a furnished Quonset hut including office equipment for the first BSP national office which was established at the Mehan Gardens.

In 1947, the BSP National Council elected Daza Treasurer. In 1949, after Camus' passing, Vargas became President and worked with Daza to establish firm financial foundations for the BSP through lobbying. This included the original Sweepstakes law which helped finance the operations of the BSP and several other organisations including the Girl Scouts of the Philippines (GSP), the Philippines National Red Cross, the Philippines Tuberculosis Society Inc., among others. In 1949, Daza and Vargas lobbied the passing of Republic Act No. 397 An Act Granting the Boy Scouts of the Philippines Ten Thousand Hectares of Public Agricultural Land for Additional Support and Maintenance of Said Corporation, this act was used to acquire campsites and council offices throughout the country. The act was the basis of a later 6,000 hectare BSP Land Grant in Asuncion, Davao, and Manila. As treasurer, Daza was responsible for determining a suitable site for the BSP national office. He gave the BSP Board three choices: the Bordner School (now the Manila Science High School), the City Court site adjacent to Manila City Hall, and the US Army Hospital site which was also a Quonset hut. The board chose the US Army Hospital which is where the present national office is situated. In 1952, Daza surprised the BSP board by announcing his husbandry of BSP finances made viable the start of construction of the BSP national office building. Daza attained the services of architect Juan Nakpil for the BSP national office building's design and plans, and Gonzalo G. Puyat & Sons, Baughman and Arte Español for the furnishings.

=== President and chief scout ===
Daza began serving as acting president and chief scout in 1951, while the incumbent president and chief scout Jorge B. Vargas was concurrently serving the position and as a member of the World Scout Committee. In 1961, he was elected to succeed Jorge B. Vargas. Daza retired as president and chief scout in 1968.

As a gardener and orchid fancier, nearly everyday Daza would inspect and prune the BSP grounds with the BSP gardener, nicknamed Tek, and would often plant trees and flowering plants. Throughout the 1960s, Daza had PEMCO employees and Boy Scouts plant 1 million trees around the Angat Water Reservoir.

The BSP were put in charge of managing the Makiling National Scout Reservation at Mount Makiling. Daza hired an agriculturist to not only support training and camping but also to plant bananas and set up a piggery.

==== 11th World Scout Jamboree ====
Daza at the 11th World Scout Jamboree Memorial

In 1963, Daza, several other BSP officials and 3 scouts of the BSP delegation opted for an earlier flight to Greece for the 11th World Scout Jamboree. This decision saved their lives as the bulk of the BSP delegation died with the crash of United Arab Airlines Flight 869.

=== Reorganization ===
In 1985, President Marcos questioned the BSP Constitution, bylaws and provisions in the BSP charter in Commonwealth Act No. 111. On September 19, 1985, President Marcos issued Letter of Instruction no. 1481, declaring all positions in the BSP vacant. President Marcos appointed Daza as Chairman for a Temporary Executive Committee tasked to reorganize the BSP.

=== Gabriel A. Daza Award ===
The BSP Quezon Council annually award ten outstanding KAB Scouts the Gabriel A. Daza Award based on a point system considering the level and number of scouting activities they have participated in, number of scout of the year awards, and membership advancement. As of 2020, the award requires a minimum of 150 points out of a potential 240.

== Political career ==
My motto in life is this: Do my duty to God and all the people at the same time

— Don Gabriel, 1991 PERCEPTION

In 1920, Daza was superintendent and special representative of the U.S. House of Representatives Philippine Resident Commissioner Jaime C. de Veyra for the Philippines' participation in the Missouri School of Journalism's Journalism Week. Throughout the week speakers and performers promoted Filipino history, products and resources, including Filipino food, dress and an orchestra sent from the Philippines. The Made-in-the-Philippines Banquet, held on 7 May 1920, was the final event of Journalism week and took place at the Rothwell Gymnasium of the University of Missouri. The Banquet was headed by Vice-Governor of the Philippines Charles E. Yeater, Philippine Senate President Manuel L. Quezon, and U.S. House of Representatives Philippine Resident Commissioner Jaime C. de Veyra.

Daza never held an elected position in government office. However, he was respected and trusted by several presidents who appointed him to positions within government companies and committees.

- 1945, President Osmeña appointed Daza to be a member of the board of directors of both the
  - Manila Railroad Company.
  - Philippine Charity Sweepstakes Office.
- July 25, 1945, President Osmeña appointed Daza to be chairman of the Petroleum Products Control Board.
- August 2, 1945, President Osmeña appointed Daza to be a member of the National Power Corporation Board.
- 1945, Vice-president and managing director of rehabilitation of the Manila Hotel Company.
- 1946, Chairman of the Housing Committee of the Joint RP-US Executive Committee for the inauguration of the Philippine Republic.
- 1950, Vice-chairman of the National Power Corporation.
- 1950, member of the board of directors of the Manila Hotel Company.
- May 14, 1952, President Quirino appointed Daza to be a founding member of the board of directors of the National Shipyard and Steel Corporation.
- 1956, President and director of the National Economic Protection Agency (NEPA).
- 1956, member of the Coordinating Council on Economic Nationalism.
- 1958, member of the Rice and Corn Production Council.
- 1958, member of the Jose Rizal Centennial Commission.
- 1963, member of the Board of Censors for moving pictures.
- 1985, President Marcos appointed Daza as chairman for a temporary executive committee tasked to reorganize the Boy Scouts of the Philippines.

In 1946, as Vice-president and managing director of rehabilitation of the Manila Hotel, Daza was sent to the United States for procurement. He spent two months in Los Angeles, with around a $100,000 budget, buying and ordering furniture and utilities for the rehabilitation of the Manila Hotel.

== Other work ==
Daza was a member of the executive committee for the 33rd International Eucharistic Congress (IEC), which was held in Manila 3–7 February 1937. Daza was the chairman of Illumination Committee for the 33rd IEC.

In 1938, Daza was a director of the Philippine Wax Products Co.

In 1939, Daza was the director of the Ateneo Alumni Association, director of Catholic Action, reserve officer in the Signal Corps of the Philippine Army, a member in the Knights of Rizal and Knights of Columbus, and assisted with the Philippine Charity Sweepstakes and Philippine Exposition.

In 1946, Daza was a director of the Philippine Trust Company.

In 1947, Daza founded the Philippine National Red Cross. In 1951, Daza was the Assistant-Treasurer of the Philippine National Red Cross.

From 1955 to 1956, Daza was a member of the executive committee of the Second National Eucharistic Congress of the Philippines which was held in 1956, in Manila, from 28 November to 2 December. Daza and fellow boy scout and electrical engineer Hermenegildo B. Reyes were in charge of planning the event. As electrical engineers Daza and Reyes also managed the lighting and P.A. system for the event.

In 1965, Daza was a member of the executive board for the United Nations Association of the Philippines. Daza participated in the First Asian Conference on Industrialization held during the period 6 to 20 December 1965 at Manila. Daza attended as a member of the World Federation of United Nations Associations (WFUNA) observer delegation.

== Death ==
Daza died in Quezon City, Philippines on May 18, 1994, at the age of 98. Prior to his death, Daza stated that he had a pending application with the Society of Jesus so that when he died he could be buried a Jesuit.

I'd like to be remembered as a good Christian who served God and country well.

— Don Gabriel, 1991 PERCEPTION

== Personal life ==
Daza married Angeles Rosales Ortega on July 8, 1922, in Calbayog, Samar. Daza later moved to Cebu City around 1923. In Cebu City, Daza fathered his first four children Beatriz Daza Orendain, Gabriel Daza Jr., David Daza and Rodolfo Daza. Daza later moved to Manila between 1930 and 1935. In Manila, Daza fathered Elena Daza Valenzuela, Teresa Daza Baltazar and Francisco Daza.

His eldest son and namesake Gabriel Daza Jr. became a lawyer and married celebrity chef Nora Villanueva-Daza.

== Awards and honours ==
My biggest achievement in life has been this - having served God Faithfully.

— Don Gabriel on his honours, 1991 PERCEPTION

The Philippines:

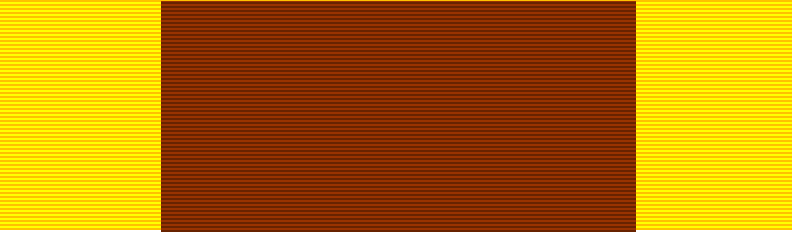
- Supreme Exchequer and Knight Grand Cross of the Order of the Knights of Rizal.

Holy See:

- Knight of the Order of St. Sylvester, knighted by Pope Pius XII in 1947.
- Knight Commander with Star Order of St. Sylvester, awarded by Pope John XXIII in 1960.

United Nations Association of the Philippines:

- General Carlos P. Romulo (CPR) Award

Boy Scouts:

- Bronze Wolf awarded by the World Scout Conference in 1965
- Silver Tamaraw (BSP)
- Mount Makiling Award (BSP)
- Tanglaw ng Kabataan Award (BSP) in 1986
- Golden Pheasant (Japan)
- Cruz de Merito (Venezuela)
- Silver Tiki (New Zealand)
- Mugunghwa Gold Medal (South Korea)

Ateneo de Manila University:

- Lux in Domino Award in 1991
