= 2022 Angeles City local elections =

Philippine elections

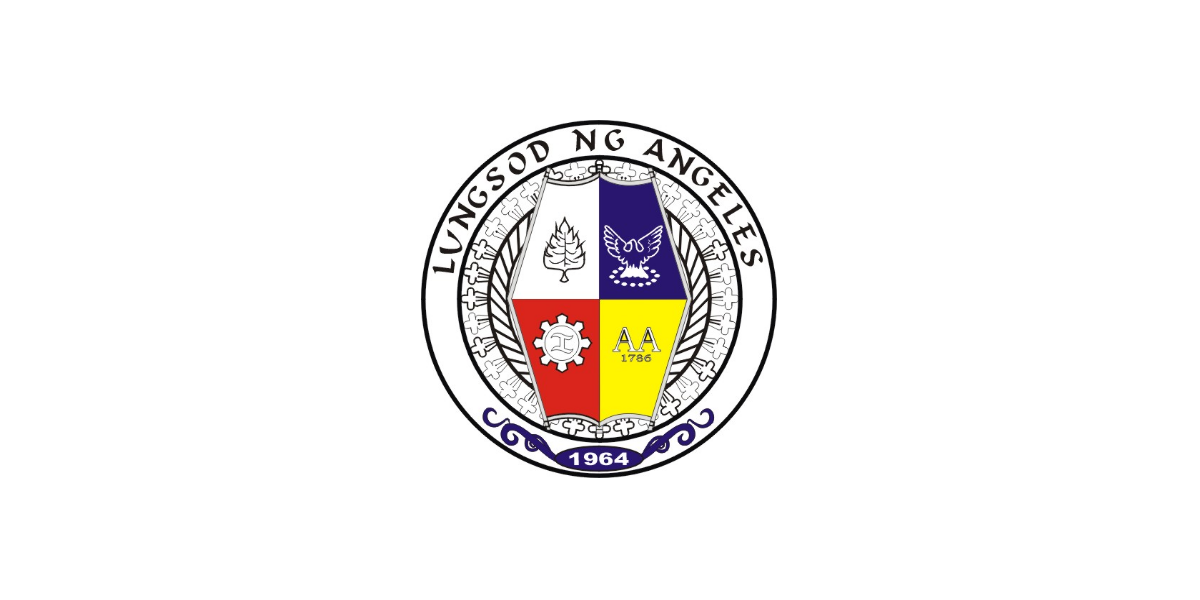
- May 9, 2022
- Mayoral election
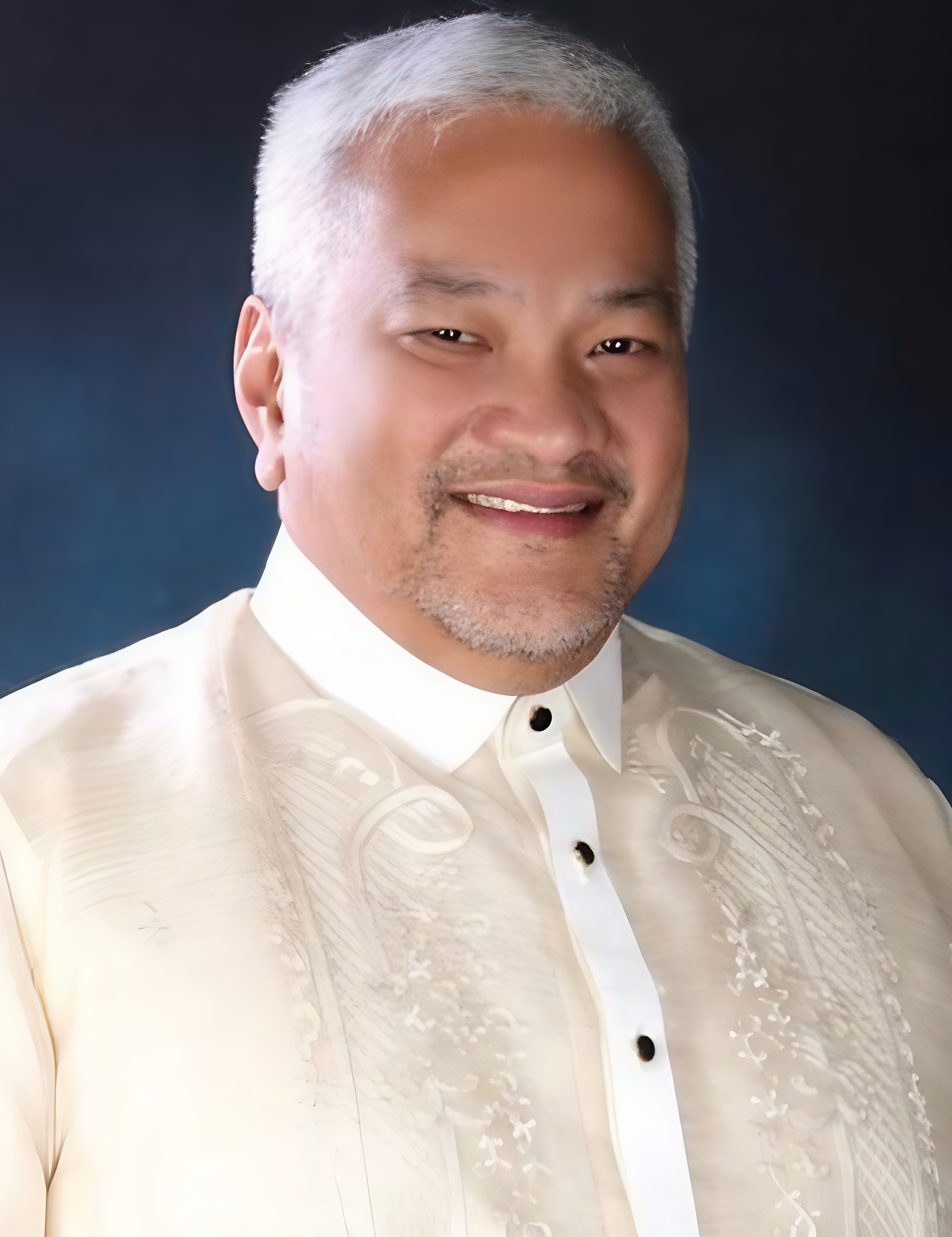

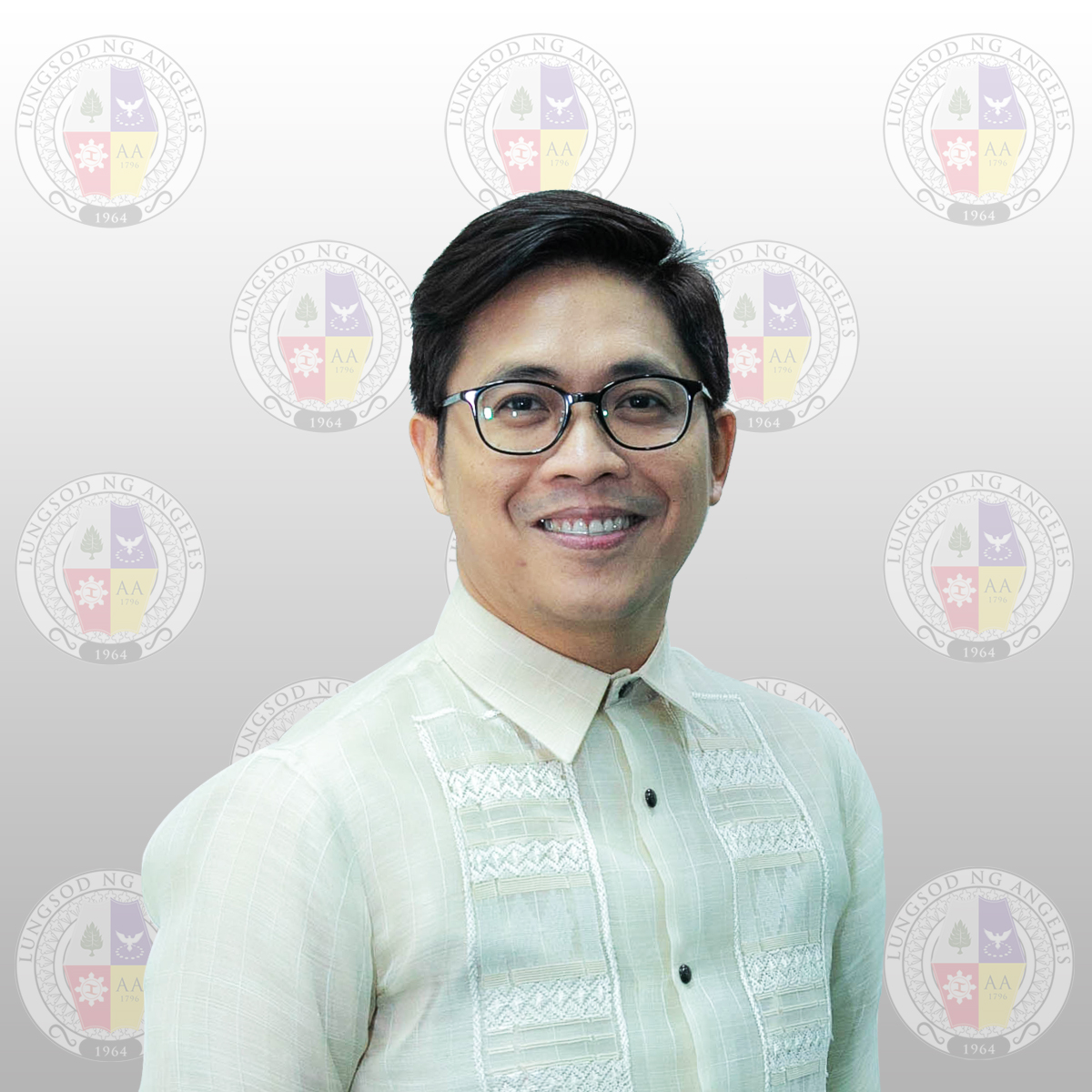
Candidate	Carmelo Lazatin Jr.	Amos Rivera
Party	KAMBILAN	Aksyon
Alliance	Team Lazatin	Team Rivera
Running mate	Vicky Vega	Pie Almerio Juan
Popular vote	103,255	45,362
Percentage	70.51%	32.62%
Mayor before election
Carmelo Lazatin Jr.
Partido Federal ng Pilipinas
Elected mayor
Carmelo Lazatin Jr.
KAMBILAN
- Vice mayoral election
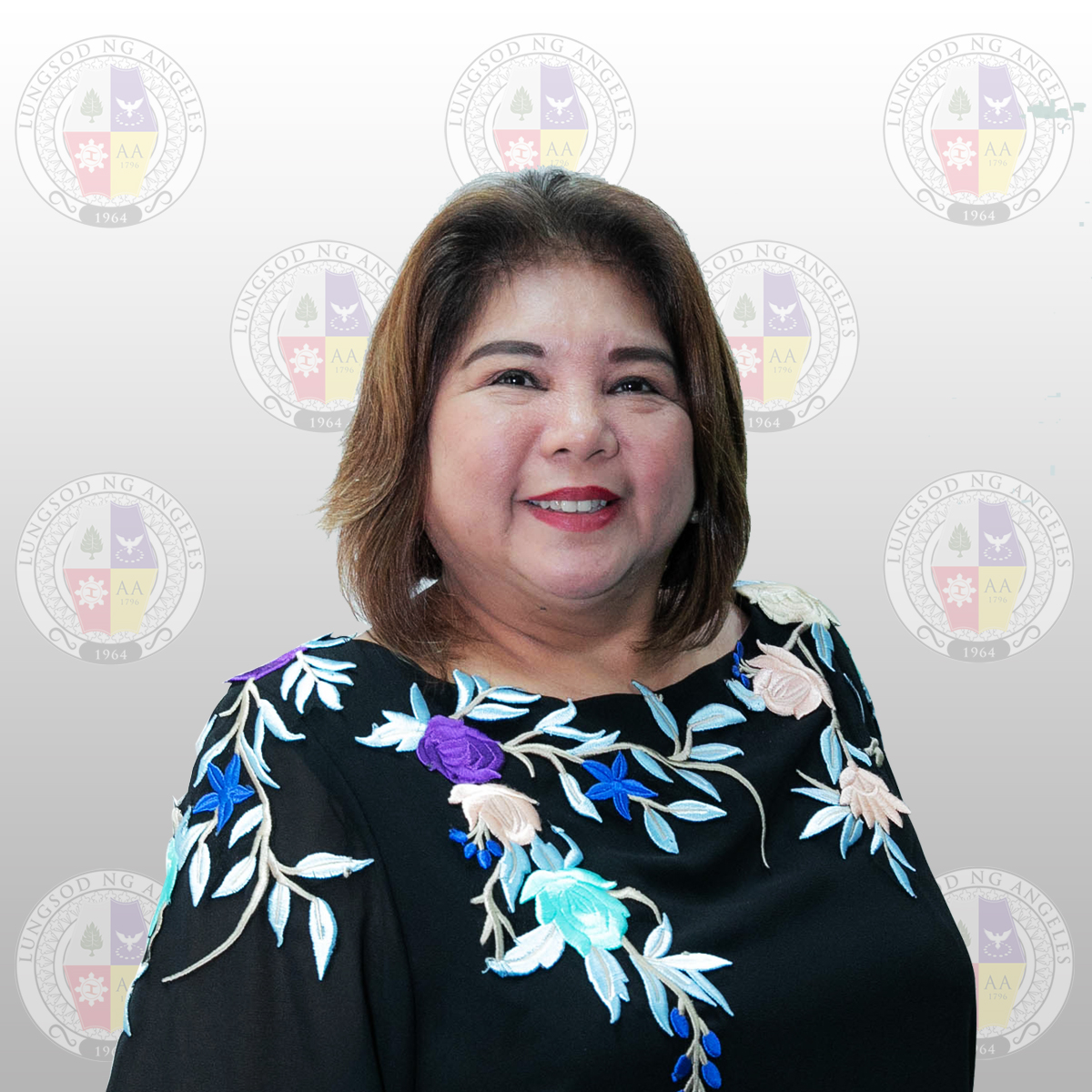
		AKSYON
Candidate	Vicky Vega	Pie Almario Juan
Party	KAMBILAN	Aksyon
Alliance	Team Lazatin	Team Rivera
Popular vote	93,697	45,362
Percentage	67.38%	32.62%
Vice Mayor before election
Vicky Vega
PFP
Elected Vice Mayor
Vicky Vega
KAMBILAN
- City Council election
- 10 out of 12 seats in the Angeles City Council; 7 seats needed for a majority
Party	Current seats
KAMBILAN	7
PAK/ABE	2
PROMDI	1

The local elections in Angeles City, Pampanga were held on May 9, 2022, within the Philippine general election. Registered voters of the city elected candidates for the following elective local posts: mayor, vice mayor, and ten councilors.

There are 205,822 eligible voters in the city for this election. Most of them voted for the incumbent.

== Background ==
Incumbent mayor Carmelo Lazatin Jr, of the KAMBILAN party filed his candidacy for a second consecutive term in this election. He was challenged by Amos Rivera of the Aksyon Demokratiko party.

Mayor Lazatin was joined by Vicky Vega, as his running mate. Amos Rivera chose Pie Almerio Juan as his running mate. Lazatin and Rivera were nominated by the parties KAMBILAN and Aksyon Demokratiko, respectively.

== Results ==
The candidates for mayor and vice mayor with the highest number of votes win the seat; they are voted separately, therefore, they may be of different parties when elected.

=== Mayoral Election ===
Parties are as stated in their certificate of candidacies. Carmelo Lazatin Jr. is the incumbent.

Angeles City Mayoralty Election
Party	Candidate	Votes	%
KAMBILAN	Carmelo Lazatin Jr.	103,255	70.51%
Aksyon	Amos Rivera	43,193	29.49%
Total votes		146,448	100.00%
KAMBILAN hold			

=== Vice Mayoral Election ===
Parties are as stated in their certificate of candidacies.

Angeles City Vice Mayoralty Election
Party	Candidate	Votes	%
KAMBILAN	Vicky Vega	93,697	67.38%
Aksyon	Pie Almario Juan	45,362	32.62%
Total votes		139,059	100.00%
KAMBILAN hold			

=== City Council Election ===
Voters elected ten councilors to comprise the City Council or the Sangguniang Panlungsod. Candidates are voted for separately so winning candidates may come from different political parties. The ten candidates with the highest number of votes win the seats.

==== Team Lazatin ====
Team Lazatin
Name	Party	Result
Pogs Suller	KAMBILAN	Won
JC Parker Aguas	KAMBILAN	Won
Dan Lacson	KAMBILAN	Won
Jay Sangil	KAMBILAN	Won
Kap Niknok Banola	KAMBILAN	Won
Raco Paolo Del Rosario	KAMBILAN	Won
Joseph Alfie Bonifacio	KAMBILAN	Won
Rodelio Mamac Jr.	KAMBILAN	Lost
Christopher Joseph Ponce	KAMBILAN	Lost

==== Team Rivera ====
Team Rivera
Name	Party	Result
Jeselle Ann Dayrit	Aksyon	Lost
Bong Arceo	Aksyon	Lost
Israel Forto	Aksyon	Lost
Harys Santiago	Aksyon	Lost
Don Edward Quito	Aksyon	Lost
Danizen Aloot	Aksyon	Lost
Arki Paul Maiquez	Aksyon	Lost

==== Results ====
Angeles City Council Election
Party	Candidate	Votes	%
KAMBILAN	Pogs Suller	86,537	54.95
KAMBILAN	JC Parker Aguas	80,606	51.18
KAMBILAN	Dan Lacson	71,202	45.21
KAMBILAN	Jay Sangil	68,600	43.56
KAMBILAN	Kap Niknok Banola	65.490	41.58
PAK/ABE	Alex Indiongco	63,240	40.15
KAMBILAN	Raco Paolo Del Rosario	57,766	36.68
PAK/ABE	Edu Pamintuan	56,052	35.59
KAMBILAN	Joseph Alfie Bonifacio	55,156	35.02
PROMDI	Chris Cortez	54,754	34.77
KAMBILAN	Rodelo Mamac Jr,	54,233	34.43
KAMBILAN	Christopher Joseph Ponce	53,107	33.72
Independent	Alexander Cauguiran	49,578	31.48
PDP–Laban	Ron Pineda	47,336	30.06
PROMDI	Alma Mercado	39,736	25.23
Aksyon	Jeselle Ann Dayrit	36,640	23.26
Aksyon	Bong Arceo	30,366	19.28
Aksyon	Israel Forto	28,501	18.10
Aksyon	Harvs Santiago	24,889	15.80
Aksyon	Don Edward Quito	18,647	11.84
Aksyon	Danizen Aloot	17,750	11.27
Aksyon	Arki Paul Maiquez	17,531	11.13
Independent	Randy Malonzo	11,385	7.23
Independent	William Aguilar	8,541	5.42
Independent	Nong Tamayo	5,720	3.63
Independent	Bry Eribal	2,676	1.70
Total votes		205,822	100.00%
