= United Nations Association of the Philippines =

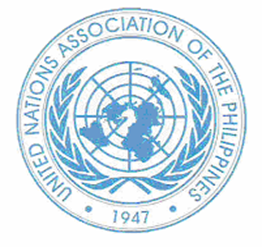
- Logo of the United Nations Association of the Philippines
- Abbreviation: UNAP
- Formation: 1947
- Type: Non-governmental organization
- Headquarters: Manila, Philippines
- Region served: Philippines
- Official language: Filipino and English
- President Emeritus: Judge Aurora N. Reciña (Ret.): Roderick C. Cruz; President October 24, 2021 to October 24, 2023
- Affiliations: World Federation of United Nations Associations
- Website: www.unap.org.ph

The United Nations Association of the Philippines (abbreviated as UNAP) is a national civic, non-sectarian and non-partisan organization, established in 1947 to help promote in the Philippines the ideals and objectives of the United Nations. To this end, it strives at all times to promote world understanding, cooperation and peace among nations based on human dignity and universal friendship. UNAP is a member of the World Federation of United Nations Associations, based in New York and Geneva, Switzerland.

UNAP undertakes a year-round continuing program of activities responsive to the needs of national development and international cooperation and Helps in the realization of United Nations Sustainable Development Goals in the Philippines and the World, in consultation with the United Nations Information Center (UNIC) for the Philippines and in collaboration with the Department of Foreign Affairs, Commission of Higher Education, the Department of Education.Philippine Commission of Women and other Government and Non Governmental Organizations. The youth arm of the UNAP is the United Nations Youth Association of the Philippines (UNYAP). Formerly known as Youth for United Nations (YFUN).

It provides appropriate information to assist in the dissemination of the workings of the United Nations; designed to enhance inter-cultural understanding within the country as well as international understanding, cooperation and peace through the annual celebration of the United Nations Days and Observances, to attain a peaceful, progressive and developed Philippines.

The first UNAP President was Dr. Mariano V. delos Santos, an academician and socio-civic leader and founder of the University of Manila. Former UNAP Presidents include: Senator Geronima Pecson, Former Education Secretary Narciso Albarracin, Dr. Leticia de Guzman, Philippine Women's University President ( October 1974- October 1999), former Congresswoman and Women Leader/Educator Dr. Minerva Laudico (October 24-July 2006) Former Commission on Human Rights Chairperson Judge Aurora Recina (August 2006 - October 24, 2015) Technological University of the Philippines President Dr. Adora S. Pili (October 24, 2015-~October 24,2017)., Dr. Mona Dumlao-Valisno, former Secretary of the Department of Education (Philippines) (October 24, 2017- January 31, 2020). Dr. Amelia Lourdes "AMELOU" Benitez-Reyes University President and Former Chairperson Philippine Commission on Women (January 31, 2019-April 2021) Dr. Editha V. Pillo President Eulogio Amang Rodriguez Institute of Science and Technology (EARIST), (May 1, 2021-October 23, 2021. UNAP Board of Trustees are leaders coming from different sectors of Philippine Society.

== Purpose ==
The United Nations Association of the Philippines shall help actualize the ideals of the United Nations and to promote better understanding and appreciation of its activities in the maintenance of peace and security, in the acceleration of economic and social development, and in the promotions of harmonious relations among the nations of the world for the good of all mankind, and shall strive to involve the Filipino people in the attainment of these ends.

To carry out its purposes, the UNAP shall:

- have continuing program of activities responsive to the conditions and needs of national development as well as international progress;
- provide for a systematic study and evaluation of its programs;
- keep abreast of and be well-informed about the vital issues and trends within the purview of its concerns;
- promote innovative activities designed to enhance intercultural understanding within the country as well as international understanding, cooperation and peace;
- provide appropriate media for the dissemination of information about its work and that of the United Nations and its agencies;
- associate and network with organizations, institutions, and agencies which have purposes similar to those of the UNAP;
- participate, through duly designated representatives in national and international conferences, for a symposia and similar activities whose concerns are related to those of UNAP;
- provide a system for stabilizing, maintaining, and managing the financial and other resources of UNAP;
- solicit and accept donations, contributions and bequests in accordance with existing laws of the Republic of the Philippines;
- undertake such other activities as the Biennial General Assembly and Board of Trustees shall deem appropriate and necessary.

== Notable Members ==
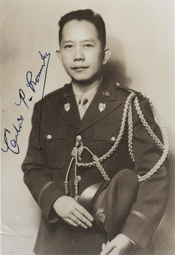
Gen. Carlos P. Romulo

- Gen. Carlos P. Romulo
- Senator Geronima Pecson
- Education Secretary Narciso Albarracin
- Congresswoman Dr. Minerva Laudico
- DFA Undersecretary Felino Neri
- Judge Aurora Navarette-Reciña (Ret.)
- Dr. Leticia de Guzman
- Dr. Mariano V. delos Santos
- Dr. Vidal Tan
- Concepcion Aguila
- Rafaelita Hilario Soriano
- Pura Santillan Castrence
- Manuel Gallego
- Helena Benitez
- Dr. Leticia Perez de Guzman
- Dr. Marcelino A. Foronda, Jr.
- Alexander Ruiz

== The General Carlos P. Romulo (CPR) Awards ==
According to UNAP President Emeritus Judge Aurora Navarette-Reciña, "The award was conceived 67 years ago by the late General Carlos P. Romulo to encourage people from all sectors of society to be role models in advocacy programs or endeavors that will put the country into the world map and give them due recognition for their greatness."

The United Nations Association of the Philippines aims to award those who have made Filipinos proud in their diverse achievements personally and professionally and, like CPR, contributed to world peace and development. "In my blood runs the immortal seed that flowered down the centuries in deeds of courage and defiance,” thus reads what may be then United Nations General Assembly President Carlos P. Romulo’s most celebrated speech, “I am a Filipino."

=== Past Awardees ===
- President Fidel V. Ramos
- Senator Helena Zeth Benitez
- Senator Leticia Ramos-Shahani
- Senator Jose W. Diokno
- Senator Lorenzo Tañada
- Chief Justice Claudio Teehankee

*Dr. Leticia Perez De Guzman

- Dr. Minerva Guysayco Laudico
- Dr. Frederick So Pada
- Dr. Virgilio De Los Santos
- Sec. Domingo Siazon
- Former CHED Chairwoman Patricia Licuanan
- Lea Salonga
- Manny Pacquiao
- Atty. Loida Nicolas Lewis
- Former Pasig Mayor Maribel Eusebio
- Dr. Adora S. Pili
- Dr. Estefania Aldaba Lim
- Hon. Gabriel A. Daza
- Ambassador Lauro L. Baja Jr.
- Judge Aurora Naverette-Reciña (Ret.)
- Former DepEd Secretary
- Dr. Mona Dumlao-Valisno
- Department of Education Sec. Leonor Magtolis Briones.
