= Coalition for Change (Philippines) =

Defunct coalition supporting Rodrigo Duterte

Coalition for Change Kilusang Pagbabago
- Leader: Rodrigo Duterte
- Senate leader: Koko Pimentel
- House leader: Pantaleon Alvarez
- Founded: May 16, 2016
- Dissolved: June 30, 2022
- Succeeded by: UniTeam
- Headquarters: Metro Manila
- Ideology: Federalism; Populism; Dutertismo
- Political position: Big tent; Factions: Left-wing to right-wing
- Colors: Yellow, dark blue, red
- Senate: 11 / 24
- House of Representatives: 203 / 303

Kilusang Pagbabago (lit. 'Coalition for Change') was the informal name of a multi-party umbrella coalition formed by the supporters of the administration of Rodrigo Duterte and the 17th Congress of the Philippines. Headed by PDP–Laban, it has formed coalition agreements with the Nacionalista Party, Lakas–CMD, Nationalist People's Coalition and National Unity Party, as well as the Centrist Democratic Party and an independent congressional block of 24 party-list groups.

== Coalition partners ==
=== Political parties ===
Party	Abbr.	Date joined	Members		Ref.
Party	Abbr.	Date joined	17th Congress	18th Congress	Ref.
Partido Demokratiko Pilipino–Lakas ng Bayan; Philippine Democratic Party–People's Power	PDP–Laban	–	2 senators 94 representatives	3 senators 52 representatives	
Nacionalista Party; Nationalist Party	NP	May 16, 2016	3 senators 37 representatives	4 senators 43 representatives	
Lakas–Christian Muslim Democrats; People Power–Christian Muslim Democrats	Lakas–CMD	May 18, 2016	5 representatives	1 senator 24 representatives	
Nationalist People's Coalition	NPC	May 20, 2016	3 senators 33 representatives	3 senators 38 representatives	
National Unity Party	NUP	May 23, 2016	28 representatives	39 representatives	
Centrist Democratic Party of the Philippines; Partido Demokratiko Sentrista ng Pilipinas	CDP		1 representative	1 representative	

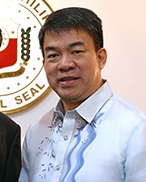
Senator Koko Pimentel, the leader of PDP–Laban and the Coalition for Change

=== Party-lists ===
The following is a list of party-lists associated with the coalition:

- 1 - Care (1)
- 1 - Sagip (1)
- 1 - Pacman (2)
- ABS (1)
- 1-Ang Edukasyon (1)
- AAMBIS-Owa (1)
- Aangat Tayo (1)
- AASENSO (1)
- Ang Kabuhayan (1)
- ANGKLA (1)
- A TEACHER (1)
- BH (1)
- Buhay (2)
- Butil (1)
- CIBAC (1)
- Coop-NATCCO (2)
- Kabayan (2)
- Kalinga (1)
- Kusug Tausug (1)
- Manila Teachers (1)
- Mata (1)
- PBA (2)
- TUCP (1)
- YACAP (1)

=== Non-political groups ===
- Mayor Rodrigo "Rody" Duterte-National Executive Coordinating Committee (MRRD NECC)
- Volunteers Against Crime and Corruption (VACC)

=== Former members ===
- Makabayan (until 2017)

== Relationship with Hugpong ng Pagbabago ==
In February 2018, President Rodrigo Duterte's daughter and Davao City Mayor Sara Duterte founded Hugpong ng Pagbabago, a political party in Davao Region, aligned with Sara's umbrella coalition Tapang at Malasakit Alliance which also supported by four governors in the Davao region except for Douglas RA Cagas of Davao del Sur as well to Davao del Norte 2nd District Representative Antonio Floirendo Jr. who feuded with House Speaker Pantaleon Alvarez over corruption allegations against Floirendo. Sara Duterte accused Alvarez as a traitor as Alvarez allowed former Liberal Party members (notably Janette Garin and husband Iloilo Rep. Oscar Garin Jr.) to join PDP–Laban, her father's affiliation, and promised that she will campaign for Alvarez's potential foe in 2019. On July 23, 2018, Alvarez was ousted by the more than 180 colleagues in the House for speakership (although Alvarez still sat as the Speaker during President Duterte's SONA), and the media reported that Sara urged congresspeople to dethrone Alvarez and replace him with former President and Pampanga Rep. Gloria Macapagal Arroyo.

The CFC/PDP–Laban slate is endorsed by President Rodrigo Duterte with some differences with Senator Koko Pimentel. Duterte endorsed Freddie Aguilar who was denounced by Pimentel, with Pimentel adding independent Senator Grace Poe and former Senator Lito Lapid (replacing Aguilar) of the Nationalist People's Coalition to complete the 12-seat senatorial slate of the CFC/PDP–Laban. The Hugpong ng Pagbabago of Davao City mayor Sara Duterte is not endorsing Lapid and Poe, and instead is endorsing former senators Bong Revilla and Jinggoy Estrada, who are both involved in the pork barrel scam of Janet Lim-Napoles during the Aquino administration, in which Revilla was acquitted while Estrada was granted bail.

== 2019 Senatorial slate ==
Candidate	Party	Last position in government	Relatives in government	Elected
Raffy Alunan	Bagumbayan	Secretary of the Interior and Local Government (1996 - 1998)	None	No
Freddie Aguilar	Independent	None (singer)	None	No
Sonny Angara	LDP	Incumbent Senator (2013–present)	Senator Edgardo Angara (father) and Aurora governor Bellaflor Angara-Castillo (aunt)	Yes
Pia Cayetano	Nacionalista	Representative of Taguig (2016–2019)	Senator Alan Peter Cayetano (brother), Senator Rene Cayetano (father)	Yes
Ronald "Bato" dela Rosa	PDP–Laban	Former Bureau of Corrections Chief (2018)	None	Yes
JV Ejercito	NPC	Senator (2013–2019)	Manila Mayor Joseph Estrada (father), San Juan Mayor Guia Gomez-Ejercito (mother), former Senator Jinggoy Estrada (half-brother)	No
Christopher "Bong" Go	PDP–Laban	President Rodrigo Duterte chief-aide	None	Yes
Zajid Mangudadatu	PDP–Laban	Congressman of Maguindanao (2013–2019)	Maguindanao Governor Datu Esmael Mangudadatu (brother)	No
Imee Marcos	Nacionalista	Governor of Ilocos Norte (2010–2019)	former President Ferdinand Marcos (father), Congresswoman Imelda Marcos (mother), former Senator Bongbong Marcos (brother)	Yes
Koko Pimentel	PDP–Laban	Incumbent Senator (2011–present)	Senator Aquilino Pimentel Jr. (father)	Yes
Francis Tolentino	PDP–Laban	President Rodrigo Duterte political adviser	Congressman Abraham Tolentino (brother)	Yes
Cynthia Villar	Nacionalista	Incumbent Senator (2013–present)	former Senator Manuel Villar (husband), former DPWH Secretary Mark Villar (son), former congressman from Las Piñas Filemon Aguilar (father) and Las Piñas congressman Vergel Aguilar (brother)	Yes

== See also ==
- Hugpong ng Pagbabago
