= Malay Democrats of the Philippines =

Political party in the Philippines

- President: Rey Angelo Ramirez
- Chairman: Bayan De la Cruz
- Secretary-General: Ruby Diaz
- Founded: March 23, 1987
- Headquarters: Francesca Towers, Quezon City
- Ideology: Centrism
- Colors: Red Yellow and Blue

Website
- www.nepa1934.org

Malay Democrats of the Philippines is a political party of the Philippines. It was first registered as Lakas ng Pilipino party on March 23, 1987, with registration number SPC 86-027. In an order dated February 9, 2001, the Commission on Election acting on a petition filed by former Department of Budget and Management Secretary Salvador Enriquez, renamed the party as Malay Democrats of the Philippines with registration number SPP 01–006. Malay Democrats of the Philippines is considered an offshoot of National Economic Protectionism Association (NEPA), a local non-government organization in the Philippines. MDP is the political arm of National Economic Protectionism Association while National Economic Protectionism Association is considered its social arm.

== History ==
- As Lakas ng Pilipino party

In 1986, party leaders registered the Lakas ng Pilipino (Power of the Filipinos) party. In 1995, it participated in elections in Metro Manila garnering the second most votes.

- Transition to Malay Democrats of the Philippines

In 2001, Lakas ng Pilipino was renamed as Malay Democrats of the Philippines by the Commission on Election, a government agency in charge of elections in the Philippines.

On September 4, 2010, at Club Filipino, the party conducted its first meeting to discuss the party's manifesto under its newly drafted revitalization plan. Before adjournment, the participants agreed to become part of the Ad Hoc committee which will serve as its steering committee since the current officers generally have nominal functions in the party. Its leader former budget secretary Salvador Enriquez wanted to allow the younger members to take active role in building the party.

The second meeting was held on September 11, 2010, at the same venue. The holding of series of meetings on the same venue is in line with the historical role of Club Filipino in Philippine politics. Its third meeting was held on September 18, 2010, still on the same venue.

In 2011, through the efforts of the National Executive Committee, chapters were formed in several provinces among them Nueva Ecija, Cavite, Rizal, Albay, Camarines Sur, Sorsogon, Lanao Del Sur and in several cities in Metro Manila like Caloocan, Manila etc.

Today, the political party is under revitalization and poised to participate and field candidates in the 2013 elections in the Philippines.

== Party officials ==
National Executive Committee

- Chairman Emeritus - former Secretary Salvador M. Enriquez, Jr.
- Chairman - Bayan Dela Cruz
- President - Rey Angelo Ramirez
- Vice President Internal - Marlet Badeo
- Vice President External - Brian Lu
- Secretary-General - Ruby Diaz

== Party Manifesto ==
The Philosophy of Nationhood The “good life” of the Filipino Malays in the Philippines is an objective that must be pursued, clearly by the enterprise unit that is the nation, establishment and sustenance of which must be the subject of a sacred covenant.

- The nation, like an individual, has body and spirit... the body manifested by the endowments of the country and its people, while the spirit is manifested by the faith, the morality and the values of the nation.
- The nation is inspired by the intentions and plans of God the Father, guided by ways Christ has shown us, and sustained by the caring for, and of, our fellowmen that the Holy Spirit has enabled us.

The Covenant of Leadership

The Social Covenant

1. The Philippines is a nation made up of a country well blessed with bountiful and beautiful natural resources, and a kind of people capable of protecting, sustaining and making the country more productive, and naturally deserving of the benefits of such blessings.
2. The quality of physical health (life), the depth and breadth of education (liberty), and the morality of our options in the pursuit of happiness, describe the kind of society we have established. Malays to gain and sustain freedom.
3. Nation building, as in community building is largely a phenomenon of the dependence or reliance on one another, which is a function of such value as honesty that should be developed among the stakeholders.
4. Empowering the Filipino Malay society shall require the provision of opportunities to enable them to participate in the socio-political and socio-economic spheres of engagement and decision-making processes.

The Economic Covenant To protect, promote, advance, sustain and enjoy such endowments, the economic philosophies we live by are:

1. The Filipino Malays must be the foremost determinant of the economy so that they may become the principal beneficiaries thereof.
2. The nation's production capability and capacity are the most important measures of economic progress and development.
3. Rational sourcing of inputs and equitable distribution of outputs help the economy grow faster, as in optimizing employment with which the sharing of economic activities is optimized.
4. Consumption of the people within the country is supposed to be equal to the production of the people in the country, and one must function as effective stimulus of the other.
5. Real economic progress of the nation is best measured through the strength of its economic powerbases – the regions, cities, municipalities and the barangays.

The Political Covenant

1. The stakeholders of the national enterprise, invariably referred to as the citizens, in the exercise of their sovereignty, have to commit to duties and responsibilities before they can claim for rights and privileges.
2. The political power structure of a truly democratic government is one that is sustained and inspired by the values and inspirations of the dominant class of the citizenry.
3. The political order must ensure that vision driven, moral, and competent stakeholders appreciate the need to provide leadership in government.
4. The strength of a nation lies on the capacities and capabilities of all its governing units – serving as the foundation of the state.

== Party Principles ==
1. Filipinos must be the sole determinants of Philippine economy, so that they become the principal beneficiaries of the fruits of development. One decides invariably for one's benefit. Filipinos should benefit from the gain of the Philippine economy; in like manner, they will also suffer from the dysfunctions and retrogression of the economy.
2. While the Philippine economy needs to reckon with developments in the globalized economic order, it must aggressively protect and promote the resources and advantages of Filipinos in this economic environment (liberation and low-wage policy reversed).
3. Let us show aversion to multinational efforts to increase the world economic pie. We can participate in and identify the moves and opportunities that the Philippine economy can tale advantage of. Let us put Filipino priorities above the interest of other nations, while extracting from them that which will benefit Filipino enterprise.
4. Guided free enterprise will rationalize the production, distribution and consumption factors of the economy. Truly, a democratic-capitalistic environment is still the best propellant of Filipino creativity, initiative and productivity. Collective social intervention by a moral government will indeed help direct the economy towards productivity that greatly benefits the most.
5. The nation's production capability and capacity are the true measures of economic progress and development. The productivity of any enterprise, family or nation, is essentially measured by the willingness of the unit to work hard and exert effort. Productivity if not attained by luck or by clever wheeling-dealing, nor by dependence in the generosity of another enterprise.
6. Industry is a value or virtue to be developed and sustained, not only among individuals, but also for national society. Civilization has come a long way. The sustenance of the good life is not dependent only on natural resources and God's endowments. It is also generated by man's efforts and capabilities to provide products and services that help lead to a better quality of life.
7. The nation cares more for economic activities that rely on one and/or are supportive of another within the country (upstream-downstream, input-output, agro-industry). Building a nation's economy is the result of widening network of economically complementary activities. Agriculture and industry can co-exist in a symbiotic manner. In the same way, big and small businesses can have mutually rewarding relationships.
8. Rational sourcing of inputs and equitable distribution of outputs help the economy grow faster, as in expanding employment and productive activities that broaden the sharing of the economic pie. The economy progresses most rapidly when activities are undertaken by the broadest constituency of the enterprise unit, both by contributing to inputs and by sharing in the outputs.
9. Industry is a value or virtue to be developed and sustained, not only among individuals but for national society specifically. The production of more people in the national economic enterprise helps hasten the achievement and broadens the scale of progress and development. Providing employment to as many people as possible is one way of opening more doors to stakeholder involvement. Conversely, raising productivity through the capital of a few oligarchs does not generate the desired progress.
10. Productivity that propels the desired economic development is what which results from production that leads to ever-growing links enterprise building. Optimizing productivity is achieved by prioritizing the production of tolls and machinery that are used in producing more goods. For example, manufacturing a tractor that will consequently prepare the soil for plating agricultural products is definitely more beneficial than producing carbonated and junk foods of equal value.
11. Rational distribution of inputs and outputs includes the propriety of vertical allocation of inputs and outputs of every participant in the national enterprise. What is cost to a consumer is income to a supplier, who in turn will be a consumer of another supplier. This consumption-supply chain optimizes benefits produced to both players.
12. Consumption of people within the country is supposed to be equal to the production of people in the country. One must function as an effective stimulus of the other. Consumption in the country should stimulate production within the country as well. The cost of consumption should be the income of production. Consumption by Filipinos that results in income for non-Filipinos, should be discouraged.
13. To stimulate production, consumption needs to be disciplined to be consistent with the social covenant, particularly as we reckon with the needs of succeeding generations. The Philippines is largely an agricultural country blessed by God and nature's endowments. Filipinos must utilize the framework of sustainable development in addressing the people's basic economic needs and in developing the national economy, while concomitantly protecting and preserving the resources of succeeding generations.
14. Consumption is properly deserved to the extent to which one has contributed to production. Those who produce wealth of the economy, by the principal of social equity, deserve to enjoy the fruits of their hard labor. What one has sown will be reaped by no other than oneself. Because each and everyone of the citizenry is considered a stakeholder of the nation as an enterprise unit, their collective endeavor serves the single concern of uplifting the economy and developing the nation.

== Party slogan ==
The party's main slogan is economic protectionism and national industrialization - its primary economic agenda to support homegrown industries in the Philippines.

== Platform of government ==
The leadership of NEPA in 2010, decided to re-invigorate both the movement and the party as a parallel organization. It adopted a two-point program:

Macroeconomic review

- The party intends to review and redefine the Philippines macroeconomic policy environment by identifying the inspiring philosophies, and strategizing actions for “quick win.” The primary target is national industrialization through the identification of key policies pertaining to key industries where the country has abundant raw materials, manpower and capital to support its development. For instance, the aviation sector and its line industries has plenty of potential for generating jobs for the Philippines, yet it is one of the most neglected sectors in the economy in terms of policy support system. Aviation, particularly its two line industries - airline and airport industries, are support system to the tourism sector and its allied industries. The party proposes a synergy of industrialization in both sectors to trigger developments on the other.

Small Filipino enterprise strengthening. Determine how small and medium Filipino enterprises can be made to play a bigger role in economic development. Resolve how they can be helped to grow faster, while making vital advocates of economic nationalism.

== Alliances ==
As the party is building and strengthening its organizational structure, it is collaborating through linkages with minor party-lists and non-government organizations, people's organizations, community associations, transport organizations and fraternal organizations.

As a parallel, its social arm, the NEPA is collaborating with government agencies in the country serving as conduit for local government units in the provision of government services.

== 2013 Elections ==
The Malay Democrats of the Philippines plans to take part in the 2013 local elections either by directly fielding candidates or supporting candidates supportive of the Party's principles and platform. Initially, Malay Democrats of the Philippines plans to make its presence felt in Region III, Region IV-A, Region VI and the National Capital Region.

== 2016 Elections ==
The Malay Democrats of the Philippines supported the presidential campaign of Senator Grace Poe by focusing on grassroots organizing which generated more than 500,000 card bearing members nationwide.
