= Froilyn Mendoza =

Filipino politician

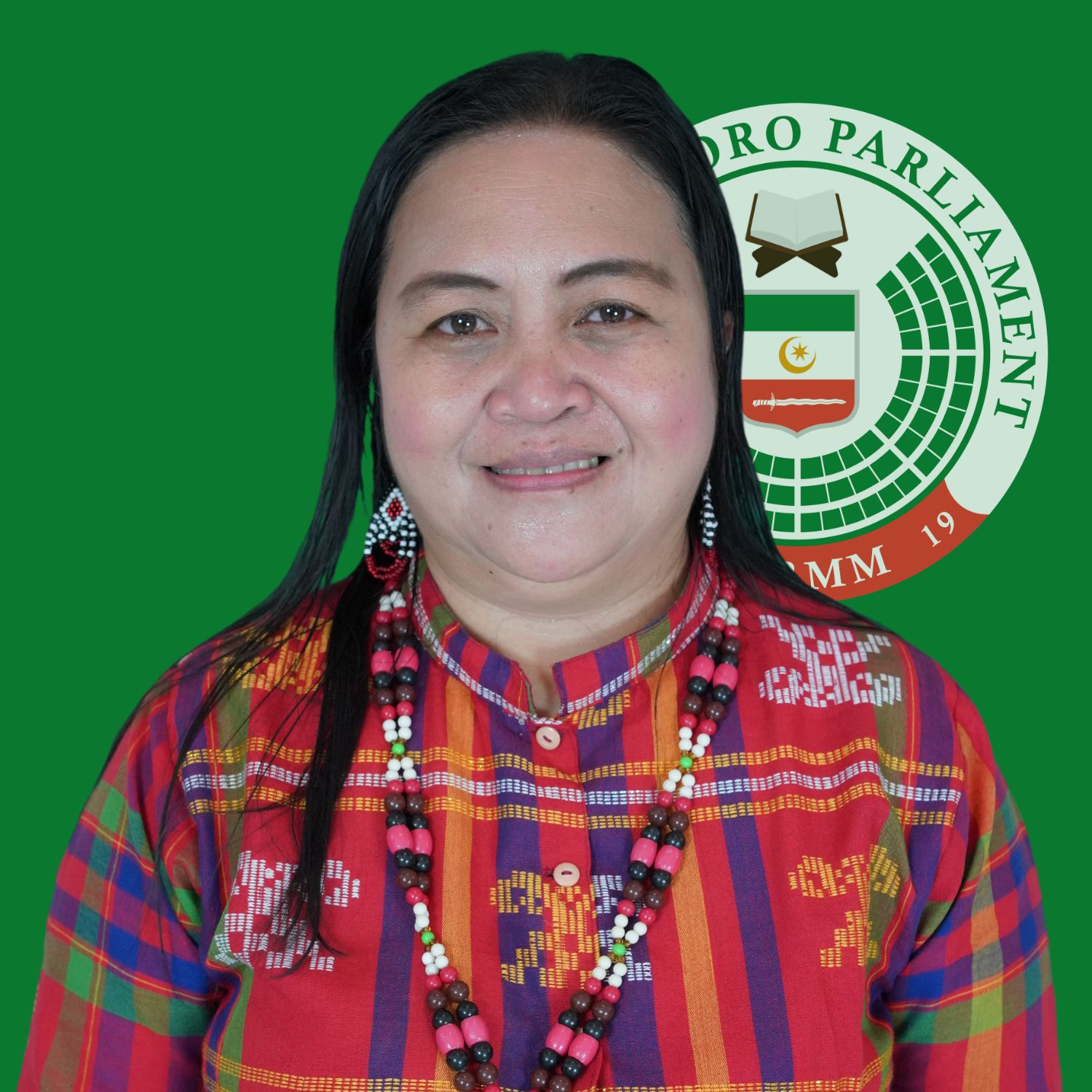

Member of the Bangsamoro Transition Authority Parliament
- Incumbent
- Assumed office September 15, 2022
- Nominated by: Philippine national government
- Appointed by: Bongbong Marcos
- Chief Minister: Murad Ebrahim

Personal details
- Born: Froilyn Laugan Tenorio; 1972 or 1973 (age 53–54)
- Party: IPDP
- Children: 2

Froilyn Tenorio Mendoza (born 1972 or 1973) is a Filipino civic worker and politician who is a member of the Bangsamoro Transition Authority Parliament as a representative of the Teduray people.

== Background and education ==
Mendoza is a member of the Lambangian tribe of the Teduray and hails from South Upi, Maguindanao del Sur. She was born to Alfredo Obregon Tenorio and Dionisia Laugan.

Her father Tenorio was the first Teduray municipal secretary who initiated the creation of South Upi as a municipality in 1977. Her mother Laugan is a school teacher and an indigenous people's rights advocate who is a co-founder of the Teduray-Lambangian Women's Organization.

While Teduray girls are usually discouraged from pursuing a full formal education, Mendoza was encouraged by her parents to study and was able to finish college. She obtained a bachelor's degree in agriculture at the University of Southern Mindanao and a second degree as a registered midwife in Northern Cotabato College.

== Career ==
Mendoza is involved in the Bangsamoro peace process and representation of her ethnic group, the Teduray. She has served as the chair of the Teduray-Lambangian Women's Organization, the third person to hold the position. She is one of the co-founders of the organization.

She has also been a member of the all-women contingent of the Civilian Protection component of the International Monitoring Team, the project manager of a special project for the advocacy of Lumad women's rights in the now defunct Autonomous Region in Muslim Mindanao (ARMM) by the United Nations Development Fund for Women and an advocacy specialist of the special project of the Institute for Autonomy and Governance for the empowerment of Indigenous Peoples in the ARMM.

=== Bangsamoro Transition Committee ===
Mendoza was appointed to the Bangsamoro Transition Commission (BTC) in 2013 by then President Benigno Aquino III. The BTC is a body which is tasked to help draft the Bangsamoro Basic Law (BBL) a charter legislation for the then-proposed autonomous Bangsamoro region intended to replace the ARMM. Mendoza was nominated by the Teduray to represent their people in the BTC.

The first BTC under Aquino lasted from 2013 to 2014, when the body was able to come up with a draft. Mendoza signed the draft with reservations since the proposed measure did not include the recognition of the Indigenous People's Rights Act within the BBL and only included mention of an "ancestral domain" rather than "ancestral domains".

=== Bangsamoro Parliament ===
Mendoza was appointed to the Bangsamoro Transition Authority Parliament by President Bongbong Marcos on August 12, 2022. She is among the seven new woman appointees to the parliament. A nominee of the Philippine national government, Mendoza represents the Non-Moro Indigenous Peoples (NMIP) in the regional legislature.

She plans to take part in the first Bangsamoro Parliament election in 2026 to vie for a seat under the Indigenous Peoples Democratic Party.

== Personal life ==
Mendoza is a mother to two children.
