= Indigenous People's Democratic Party =

- Leader: Froilyn Mendoza
- Headquarters: Cotabato City
- Ideology: Lumad Indigenism
- Colors: Red, Dark Blue
- House of Representatives: 0 / 8 (Bangsamoro seats only)
- Provincial governors: 0 / 6 (Bangsamoro only)
- Provincial vice governors: 0 / 6 (Bangsamoro only)
- Provincial board members: 0 / 46 (Bangsamoro regular seats only)
- Bangsamoro Parliament: 0 / 80

The Indigenous People's Democratic Party is a political party in Bangsamoro, Philippines. They aim to represent the non-Moro indigenous groups in the Muslim-majority autonomous region. Led by Froilyn Mendoza it seeks to participate in the 2026 election for the Bangsamoro Parliament.
