= Paciano Tangco =

Filipino military officer

Chief of the Signal Corps
- In office 1935–x
- Preceded by: Position established

Assistant District Commander of Central Luzon
- In office 1935–x
- President: Manuel L. Quezon

Provincial Commander of Pampanga
- In office x–1935

Personal details
- Born: 9 March 1892 Pateros, Rizal
- Died: 1946
- Parent(s): Julio Calingo Tangco (father); Agueda Concepción (mother)
- Education: Philippine Military Academy; Manila Law College

Military service
- Allegiance: Philippines
- Branch/service: Philippine Army
- Rank: Koronel (Colonel)

Paciano Tangco (March 9, 1892 – 1946) was a Filipino military officer who served as the Chief of the Signal Corps.

== Early life ==
Tangco was born and in Pateros, Rizal, to Julio Calingo Tangco and his wife Agueda Concepción.

== Education ==
Tangco graduated with a Bachelor of Arts from the Liceo de Manila (now Manila Central University). He later graduated with a Bachelor of Laws from Escuela de Derecho (now Manila Law College). In May, 1914, Tangco entered the Constabulary Academy (now Philippine Military Academy) as a cadet. In November, 1914, Tangco was commissioned as a Third Lieutenant.

== Military career ==
After commissioning from the Constabulary Academy, Tangco was swiftly promoted. He made second lieutenant in June, 1916; First Lieutenant in September, 1917; Captain February 1, 1920; Major, January 20, 1931; and Lieutenant Colonel September 9, 1937. He was assigned throughout the country in the provinces of Antique, Bataan, Cavite, Manila, Nueva Ecija, Pangasinan, Pampanga, Tarlac, Cotabato, Lanao, Zamboanga, and Sulu in various roles.

In the early 1930s, as a Major, Tangco attempted to provide signal communications for the Armed Forces of the Philippines. He improvised homemade radio sets for the Philippine Constabulary field operatives who were engaging in a campaign against the Asedillo-Encallado bandits in Tayabas province (now Quezon province).

In 1937, a Philippine Army plucking board had recommended Tangco for retirement on the grounds that as a Constabulary officer he sought to secure a promotion through the influence of politicians. However, Philippine President Quezon, under the reasoning of the then assistant military adviser to the Philippine Government Dwight D. Eisenhower, had Tangco reinstated. Eisenhower reasoned that political favoritism was accepted "almost as a matter of course" and that singling out Tangco was unfair.

== Legacy ==
- P. Tangco St., Pateros
