= Alexander Cauguiran =

Filipino politician and activist (born 1957)

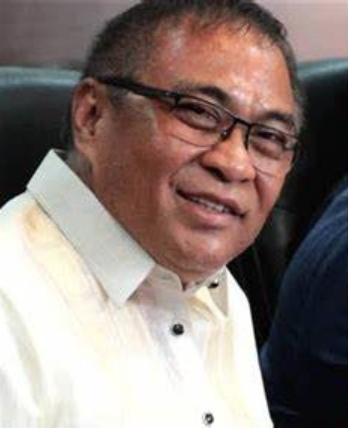
- Cauguiran in 2019

President and CEO of the Clark International Airport Corporation
- In office August 19, 2016 – October 16, 2018
- Appointed by: Rodrigo Duterte
- Preceded by: Dino Tanjuatco
- Succeeded by: Jaime Melo

Member of Angeles City Council
- In office June 30, 1998 – June 30, 2004

Personal details
- Born: Alexander Sangalang Cauguiran; August 14, 1957 (age 69) Angeles, Pampanga, Philippines
- Party: PAK/ABE (2012–present)
- Other political affiliations: Independent (2021–2022); KAMBILAN (2018–2021); Lakas (1998–2004); Bayan (1985–1988)
- Spouse: Pamela Concepcion
- Children: 1
- Education: Holy Angel University (BS); Angeles University Foundation (MPA)
- Occupation: Politician, activist

Alexander "Alex" Sangalang Cauguiran Sr. (born August 14, 1957) is a Filipino politician and activist. He served as acting president and CEO of the Clark International Airport from 2016 to 2018. He is served as chief of staff of former Angeles City Mayor Edgardo Pamintuan from 2010 to 2016 and previously from 1992 to 1998. He also served as member of the Angeles City Council from 1998 to 2004.

== Early life and education ==
Cauguiran was born on August 14, 1957, in the then-municipality of Angeles in Pampanga to Jesus Cauguiran and Lydia Sangalang. He studied Holy Angel University with the degree business administration. He took up Master in Public Administration at the Angeles University Foundation.

== Activism ==
Cauguiran started became an activist during Marcos dictatorship.

In 2025, Cauguiran became a lead convenor of the Concerned Citizens of Pampanga due to flood control projects scandal in the Philippines.

== Political career ==
=== Councilor of Angeles City (1998–2004) ===
Cauguiran became a councilor in Angeles City from 1998 to 2004 for two terms.

=== 2019 Angeles City mayoralty bid ===
In 2019 elections, Cauguiran ran as mayor of Angeles City but he lost and placed third.

=== 2022 Angeles City Council bid ===
In 2022 elections, Cauguiran ran again as councilor in Angeles City but he lost.

== Personal life ==
Cauguiran is married to Pamela Concepcion and has one son.

== Electoral history ==
Year	Election	Position	Result / Rank	Votes Received
2019	Angeles City Local Elections	Mayor	Lost – 3rd place	26,109
2022	Angeles City Local Elections	City Councilor	Lost – 13th place	49,578
