= Bawat Isa Mahalaga =

- Founder: Maria Lourdes Sereno
- Founded: September 21, 2018
- Youth wing: Youth Reform Movement
- Colors: Purple; Red; White

Bawat Isa Mahalaga (transl. Each one is important; stylized as B1M) B1M is a citizens' movement for godly governance. It believes that the key to national transformation lies in the true empowerment of the sovereign Filipino people under the framework of the Philippine Constitution.

Godly governance is not religiosity but the careful devotion to expressions of the following truths in public life: profound respect for human dignity, man's stewardship of all creation, the deliberate dismantling of structural evil, the careful and purposive establishment of human institutions that will promote justice and the raising of the nation in righteousness.

True empowerment of the sovereign Filipino people starts with an understanding of their identity rooted in an awareness of the Divine, their role in the constitutional order, the servant - not kingly - role of public officials, and the binding covenant that is the Philippine Constitution from which no Filipino is exempt.

B1M's programs seek to provide an alternative narrative to nation-building - not idolatry of men, not money politics, not manipulation of public consciousness. By looking at the long-term requirements for building a modern, democratic Filipino nation, B1M emphasizes values as building blocks that can endure for generations.

== History ==
Upon her removal from the office of the Chief Justice in May 2018, Meilou Sereno (Chief Justice Maria Lourdes Sereno.) decided to be more vocal of her political commentaries focused on social issues. This led to many believing she would run as an opposition candidate for the upcoming senate elections. While she decided not to run for public office, she decided to form a civil society group, independent of any existing political parties.
