= National Economic Protectionism Association =

NEPA
- Founded: 1934
- Founder: Salvador Araneta
- Type: Non-governmental organization
- Purpose: Promotion of Filipino industries
- Location: Francesca Towers, EDSA, Quezon City
- Region served: Philippines
- Method: Development initiative through program advocacy, policy reform and intervention, equitable distribution of resources and production, regional and rural economic development.
- Key people: Bayan dela Cruz, President
- Employees: voluntary
- Website: http://www.nepa1934.org

The National Economic Protectionism Association (NEPA) is the oldest local non-government organization in the Philippines having been established in 1934. The non-government organization was established by Filipino industrialists with the intention of protecting domestic industries, owned by Filipinos, against dominion by foreign interests and competition. Through the years of its existence, it has gone through a number of leadership changes and policy tacks. During its heyday, its leaders held key positions in the government and were actively promoting Filipino industries. It has offices at Francesca Towers, along Epifanio de los Santos Avenue (EDSA) in Diliman, Quezon City. In the 21st century, NEPA is under revitalization with mass organizing and networking with other Filipino organizations. From local organizations of small and medium enterprises (SMEs) and Filipino industrialists to inventors societies and producers. From a network of nationalist government officials and employees to ordinary Filipino consumers. It is a registered non-stock, non-profit private organization founded by 15 pioneering Filipino entrepreneurs and industrialists. NEPA has always been an active participant in the formulation of national economic policies. NEPA fosters the spirit of economic nationalism and national industrialization, and promotes the protection of Filipino interests in the country's polity, economy, culture and environment.

== History ==
- Beginning

The crusade for political independence stimulated a parallel campaign for economic freedom in early 1900s. In 1903, Ang Bagong Katipunan was organized to promote "economic nationalism" and "economic self-sufficiency" among the Filipinos. The movement had a brief but colorful existence. Nevertheless, the flame of economic nationalism continue to spread as the people's aspiration for national independence intensified in the 1920s.

- The Chamber of Commerce of the Philippine Islands

The Chamber of Commerce of the Philippine Islands, composed of Filipino businessmen, carried on the movement after the demise of Bagong Katipunan. In 1926, the Chamber issued a manifesto entitled "Ours First, Yours Later", urging the people to patronize locally made products.

- Founding

NEPA was born out of the historic necessity to hasten the industrial development of the colony in preparation for its acquisition of independence under the Tydings–McDuffie Act, signed on March 24, 1934. Centuries of Spanish rule and three decades of free trade under the Americans made the Philippines dependent on the outside world for almost every manufactured commodity — from toothpicks to nails! In early 1934, the Chamber of Commerce created a committee tasked with promoting Filipino products on a more sustained basis. In August of that year, the Chamber sponsored the "Made-in-the-Philippines Week" to popularize local products. It also organized the National Congress of Filipino Businessmen. On November 19, 1934, the Chamber's initiative gave birth to NEPA in a founding meeting held at Club Filipino.

- Founding officers

The founders were: Antonio Brias, Salvador Araneta, Isaac Ampil, Florencio Reyes, Benito Razon, Arsenio N. Luz, Joaquin Elizalde, Leopoldo R. Aguinaldo, Vicente Villanueva, Toribio Teodoro, Gonzalo Puyat, Ramon J. Fernandez, Ciriaco Tuazon, Aurelio Periquet Sr., and Primo Arambulo.

- Rise of the movement

Right after its founding, NEPA launched a nationwide campaign to promote economic protectionism. Provincial, municipal and student chapters were created all over the country. Popular meetings and assemblies, attended by thousands of Filipinos, were held in different parts of the country. "NEPA" became a trademark and a symbol of pride of Philippine-made products.

- The war years

World War II disrupted the work of NEPA. However, the pre-war consciousness-raising efforts of NEPA regarding self-reliance made it easier for individual entrepreneurs and families to produce essential commodities out of locally available materials.

- Post-war revival

NEPA was revived in late 1948 under the leadership of Senator Gil J. Puyat, Gabriel A. Daza and Daniel M. Gomez. In the 1950s, the entrepreneurs and firms associated with NEPA spearheaded the great industrial drive that developed around the program of import controls and foreign exchange controls. The rapid industrial transformation of the Philippines made her the envy of her Asian neighbors. During this period, NEPA founded the Home Industries Association of the Philippines, Filipino Inventors Society, Philippine Hatter's Association and Philippine Standards Association. The decade ended with NEPA becoming the main pillar of the "Filipino First" program of President Carlos P. Garcia.

- Difficulties of 1960s

The decade of the 1960s saw the Macapagal administration putting an end to the "Filipino First" policy. Decontrols, peso devaluation and an open door to foreign investors became the order of the day. This policy reversal, formulated by the International Monetary Fund (IMF) and implemented by a rising group of so-called technocrats, was continued in the first term of President Ferdinand E. Marcos.

- Crisis of the 1970s

In the 1970s, the Philippines literally became an open economy — open to foreign capital, foreign loans and foreign economic advisers. Filipino capitalists were relegated to junior partners under the policy of labor-intensive, export-oriented, transnational-dependent industrialization. This induced economic slowdown, which was exacerbated by the floating of the US dollar in August 1971. As a result, the Asian currencies collapsed. Such claims however are unsubstantiated as the floating of the dollar was not directly tied to worsening economic conditions as may be noted by the lack of citation for this statement. In addition, the Asian financial crisis, which was haphazardly mentioned previously as the collapse of Asian currencies, was not the result of the adoption of floating exchange rates and was in fact a result of multiple factors that resulted in rapid withdrawals of foreign denominated investments from several Asian countries.

- NEPA and the 1980s

Against the backdrop of IMF-World Bank domination of the economy, NEPA started redefining its role in the changed economic situation.

1st Conference on Economic Independence

On August 23, 1980, it organized the 1st Conference on Economic Independence, which reaffirmed that "political independence can only be meaningful in terms of the welfare of the whole nation, if our national economy is free from the control of foreign interests." The Conference expressed grave concern over the "operation of the World Bank and other international financial institutions in the Philippines which primarily benefit transnational corporations and their home countries, to the detriment of Filipino businessmen, consumers, workers and peasants, and other sectors of our society."

2nd Conference on Economic Independence

The above theme was reiterated in the 2nd Conference on Economic Independence organized in December 1983, which was held in the midst of the worst economic crisis ever experienced by the country. The Conference called for a renewal of NEPA and its transformation, once again, into a nationwide movement aimed at the promotion of genuine economic independence. In late 1984, NEPA gained another 50-year extension of its corporate life. Its leadership declared its firm resolve to push NEPA once again in the struggle to promote economic nationalism so that the Filipino shall at last be the sole determinant and principal beneficiary of the nation's economic development.

Renaissance

The year 1986 saw the renaissance of a new NEPA. It fought for the protection of our national patrimony in the Constitutional Commission, a just debt rescheduling scheme and capping of debt service, agrarian reform and import rationalization. NEPA stood for nationalist development and industrialization to fight massive poverty. In mid-1986, NEPA launched its mass organization known as Kilusang Pilipino Muna which renewed the call for the patronage of Filipino-made products and services. The late 1980s saw NEPA initiating the organization of the Freedom from Debt Coalition (FDC) and the Movement for Nationalist Industrialization (MNI).

- NEPA and the 1990s

NEPA once again vowed to be at the forefront of the struggle to promote and protect the economic interests of the Filipino people.

NEPA Manifesto

In preparation for this renewed organizational vigor, NEPA conducted a series of workshop-meetings in 1991 which culminated in the adoption of the "NEPA Manifesto" better known in its title "NEPA Vision of Development – Capitalism and Nationalism: The Missing Partnership" on December 10, 1992.

Organization and projects

This was capped by an operational planning workshop on December 29, 1992, which resulted in the adoption of the new NEPA organization system and the approval of several projects such as the revival of the Bureau of Economic Research, organization of the Information Resource Center, NEPA Training Center (which will be transformed later into the NEPA School of Business & Economics), Business Development & Management Center, NEPA Awards for Outstanding Entrepreneurs (first conducted in the 1970s), establishment of NEPA corporations and cooperatives, and the strengthening of NEPA Confederation by organizing city and municipal chapters, as well as faculty/student chapters in schools, colleges and universities throughout the country.

Campaign for economic nationalism

In mid-1990s, NEPA renewed its campaign to promote economic nationalism and new protectionism. However, the spirited NEPA plan was never pursued. The association was eclipsed by the dreamlike economic upswing coupled with a strong anti-protectionist campaign by elite business groups and bureaucrat capitalists. At that point in time, the government predicted that the Philippines would reach a newly industrialized country (NIC) status by the year 2000. In October 1996, however, NEPA insisted that the economic ascent was a mercurial upsurge. NEPA declared firmly that "if we take a closer look at the more important economic indicators, the country is not dramatically improving. The balance of trade is rising, there is still massive unemployment and underemployment, the per capita income has not increased significantly as compared to GNP growth, and the purchasing power of the peso has been stifled." NEPA re-echoed its fears that "unless certain economic fundamentals are changed, the 1990s — like the 1980s — might turn out to be another lost decade for the Philippines." In mid-1997, the Asian currencies plunged deeper than the 1971 fall.

1998 presidential campaign

At the height of the 1998 presidential campaign, most candidates were still parroting the four-fold economic policies of indiscriminate globalization, unproductive liberalization, ineffective privatization and unwieldy deregulation. NEPA maintained that the continuity of these economic policies would perpetuate the economic crises the country had been experiencing since the early 1970s. The economic decline in the last three years of the 1990s confirmed NEPA's prognostication.

Organizational hiatus

NEPA experienced organizational hiatus in late 1990s and the year 2000. Its directorial board deserted and membership dwindled—saddled with economic downtrend combined with NEPA's organizational inactivity and a silent debate on maintaining "protectionism" as its pivotal concern.

NEPA Junior

The need for a sustainable campaign and existence of the organization has given birth to the creation of NEPA Junior as the youth wing of the organization. In 2011, NEPA organized student chapters in colleges and universities in Metro Manila to raise awareness among studenty on the need for economic nationalism in the Philippines. The following year, on November 24, 2012, a new milestone of the organization was made with the formal launching of NEPA Junior at Balagtas Hall of the Polytechnic University of the Philippines. Hundreds of students from various colleges and universities from Luzon, Visayas and Mindanao converged in the event.

== The 21st century ==
Looking more closely at two important economic sectors in the current decade of the 2000s, NEPA notes that the country's manufacturing sector is not only sluggish, it continues to decline; while the agricultural sector remains uncompetitive with decreasing productivity, and worse, its sustainability is going down.

- Focus of development

Economists of some presidential candidates for the 2010 elections contend that development should focus on the service sector which employs 45% of the work force. NEPA points out that the growth of the service sector can only be sustained by accelerating the development of manufacturing industry and the rapid modernization of agriculture. NEPA, however, emphasizes that the economy can only attain sustainable growth by balancing the development of agriculture, industrial manufacturing and the service industry. The continuity of existing 30-year-old economic policies, NEPA maintains, will perpetuate the economic crises the country has been experiencing since the early 1970s. NEPA also observes that all indicators show the next administration will continue to promote the interest of big businesses and multi-national corporations. NEPA believes this will kill local manufacturing industries, particularly the small and medium enterprises, and soon, retail trade will be in the hands of foreign companies. NEPA suggests that the next administration should critically analyze the current economic programs and development policies. The new president should creatively explore new economic programs that will promote the creation of domestic manufacturing enterprises, enhance the modernization of agriculture, and sustain the growth and quality of the service industries.

- Looking back and moving forward

During the first two years of the Aquino administration, its economists predicted the country would be an industrialized nation by the end of her term. Officials of the Ramos government made a more upbeat prediction: the status of a newly industrialized country (NIC) for the Philippines by the year 2000. The Macapagal Arroyo administration also made the same prediction using the label "Strong Republic". Industrialization (or NIC-hood) means achieving an annual growth rate of at least 7–8 per cent throughout the decade. It also means halving the double-digit unemployment rate and raising the national per capita income from the subsistence level of $700 to a more decent $2,000 or more. NEPA shares the aspiration for national industrialization, which has been completely forgotten by the presidency of Gloria Macapagal Arroyo. Moreover, NEPA wants the national march to industrialization to be measured not only in terms of the rising average per capita income but also, and more importantly, in the general reduction of absolute and relative poverty of the masses, estimated by various studies to be affecting between 65 and 80 per cent of the population.

- NEPA's resolutions

NEPA is less optimistic that the nation will achieve the desired economic targets and the overall goal of industrialization beginning in the year 2010 and onwards. In fact, NEPA fears that, unless certain economic fundamentals are changed, the decade of the 2010s – like the 1980s, 1990s and 2000s – might turn out (as usual) to be another lost decade for the Philippines. Finally, NEPA resolved:

1. To promote an alternative all-out industrialization based on economic Filipinism to achieve self-sufficiency and self-sustaining growth
2. To oppose the imposition of the external forces that seek to dominate the economy and exploit the people and national resources
3. To promote a sense of nationalism among the people, a sense of belonging to each other, a sense of common purpose and common destiny, a national pride that make the improbable a reality... a Corporate Philippines or "Philippines, Inc."

== Major policy positions ==
- Increased state investment in and promotion of local manufacturing, more state support for small and medium-size entrepreneurs in the form of increased and relaxed credit windows and technical support;
- Review of export processing charters with the view of putting into place stringent import substitution and technology transfer requirements for locators in various export processing zones in the country;
- Immediate suspension and review of all tariff reduction commitments that had negative impact on agriculture and local manufacturing industries;
- Immediate suspension of the automatic appropriations for debt service, a moratorium on payments to tainted loans public or private loans (with sovereign guarantees) and the implementation of a more rational debt payment mechanisms;
- Government assistance in the promotion and development of nationalist ideals among young entrepreneurs; and
- Creation of a body to formulate a national industrialization strategy.

== NEPA Publications and related published works ==
Title	Author	Place/Date of Publication	Pages	Library Location	Catalogue Reference No.
Scope, Nature, and Object of the NEPA	Eliseo Quirino	Manila, 1935	16 pages	UP Diliman Main Library	HC 454.4 N27
Batayan ng pagkakatatag at pangangasiwa ng NEPA	Eliseo Quirino	Manila, 1937	44 pages	UP Diliman Main Library Filipiana Book Section	HC 455 Q53
NEPA Handbook	Eliseo Quirino	Manila, 1938	211 pages	UP Diliman Main Library	HC 455/N27
The NEPA and Our National Economy	Eliseo Quirino	Manila, 1940	401 pages	UP Diliman Main Library Filipiana Book Section	HC 455 Q55
NEPA, Objectives of Protectionism in the Philippines	Eliseo Quirino	Manila, 1960	168 pages	DOST - Science and Technology Information Institute	HC455 Q8
50 Years of Filipino Economic Nationalism : The National Economic Protectionism Association (NEPA) 1934–1984 (Thesis)	Renato S. Velasco	Manila, 1985	200 leaves	UP University Archives and Records Depository	LG 995 1985 A8 V45
Salvador Araneta : A Man Ahead of His Time	Ma. Lina Araneta Santiago	Malabon, 1986	32 pages	UP Diliman Main Library	DS 686.6 A73 / S26

== List of presidents ==
- Dr. Rene Ofreneo 1992-1996
- Rafael Nelson M. Aboganda 1996-2000
- Faustino G. Mendoza Jr. 2000-2008
- Bayan dela Cruz 2008–2012
- Brian James J. Lu 2012–Present
