= 2022 Philippine presidential election =

- May 9, 2022
- Opinion polls
- Turnout: 83.07% (▲2.29pp)
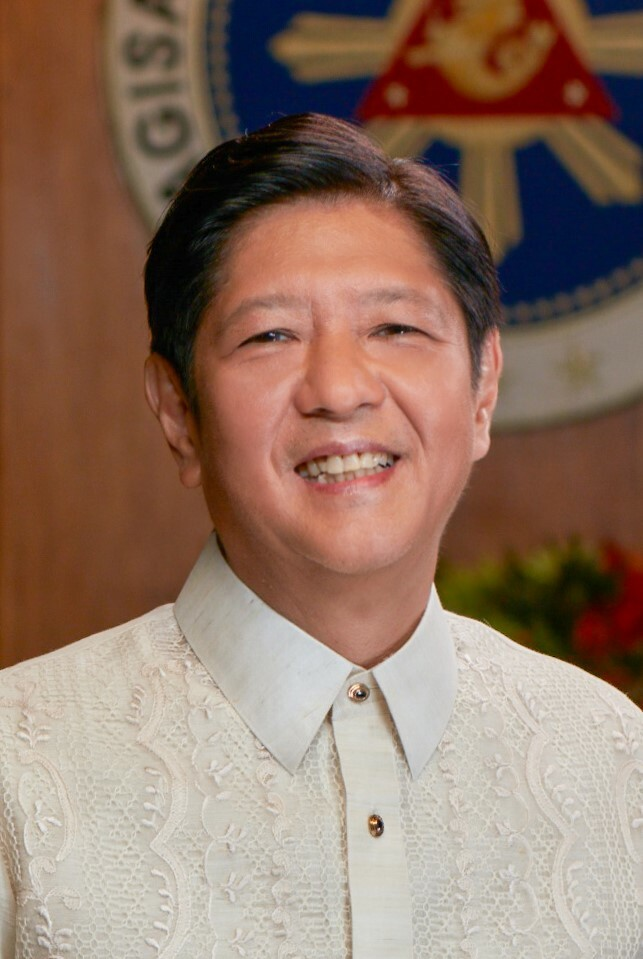

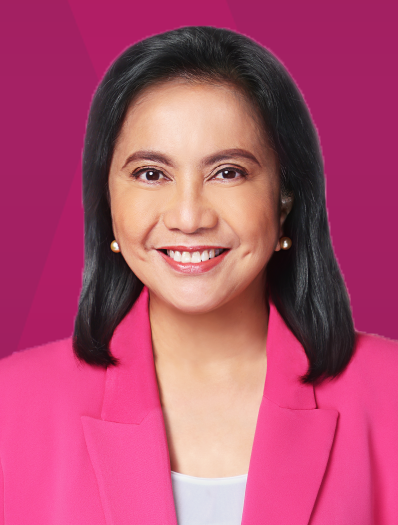

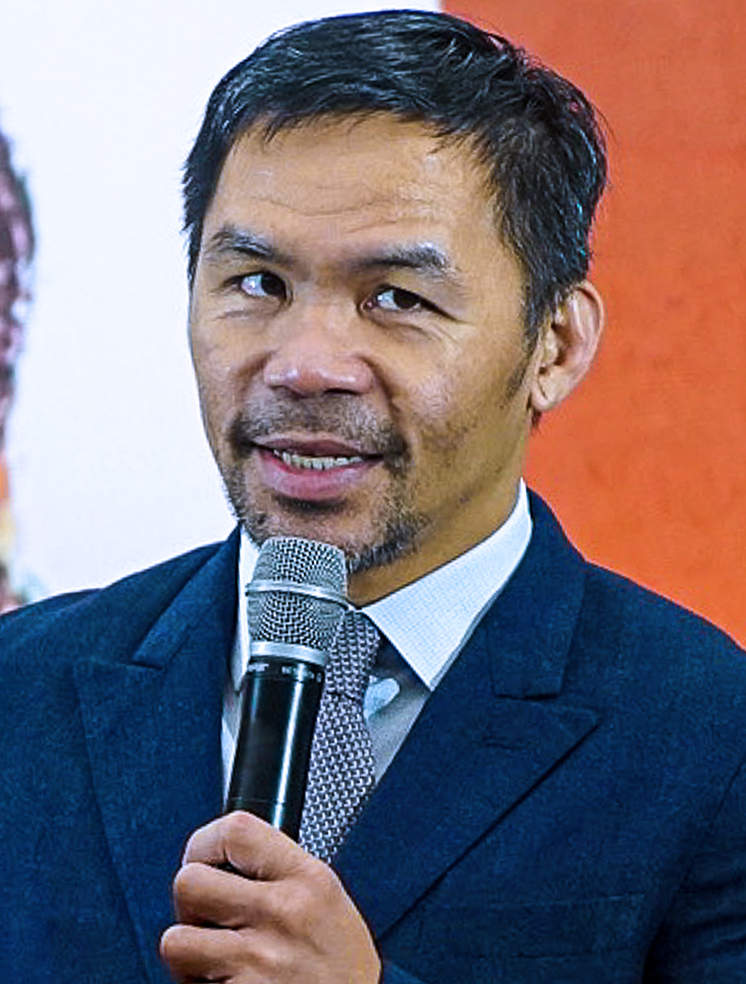
Candidate	Bongbong Marcos	Leni Robredo	Manny Pacquiao
Party	PFP	Independent (Note: Liberal Party member running as an independent)	PROMDI
Alliance	UniTeam	TRoPa	MP3
Running mate	Sara Duterte	Francis Pangilinan	Lito Atienza
Popular vote	31,629,783	15,035,773	3,663,113
Percentage	58.77%	27.94%	6.81%
- A map showing the results of the Philippine presidential election by city and province and by region.
President before election
Rodrigo Duterte
PDP–Laban
Elected President
Bongbong Marcos
PFP
- 2022 Philippine vice presidential election
- May 9, 2022
- Opinion polls

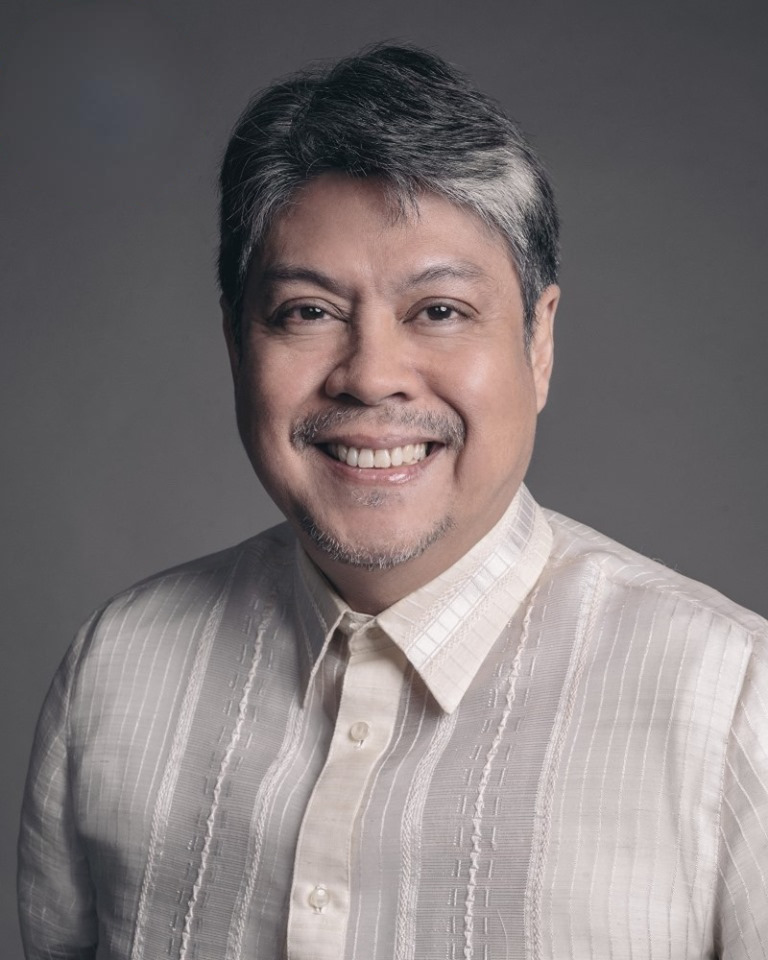

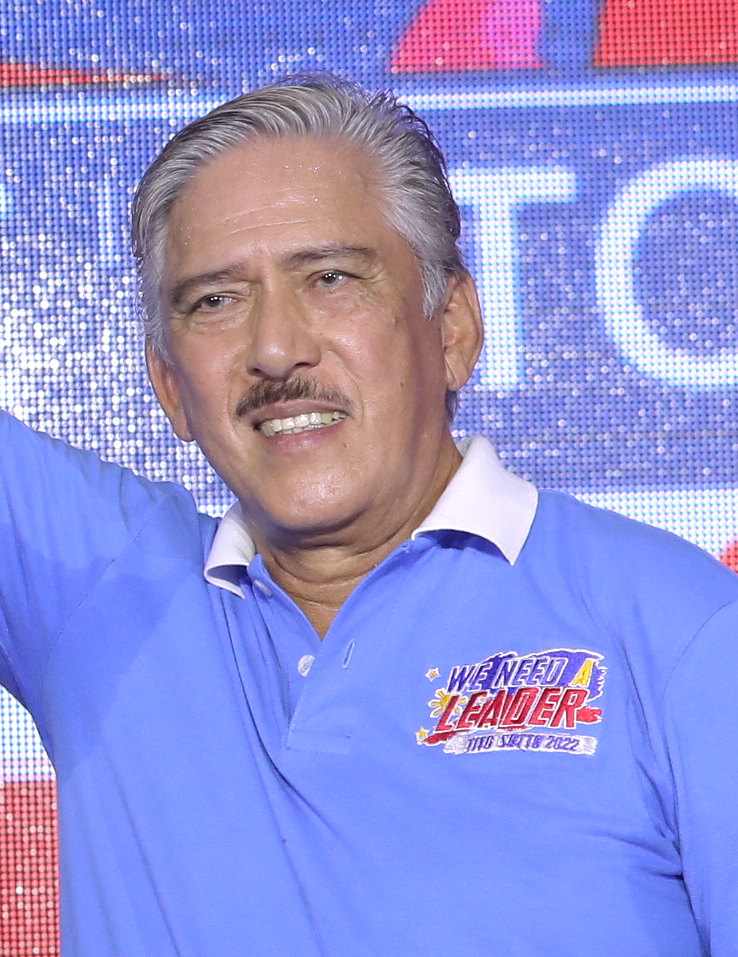
Candidate	Sara Duterte	Francis Pangilinan	Tito Sotto
Party	Lakas	Liberal	NPC
Alliance	UniTeam	TRoPa	Reporma–NPC
Popular vote	32,208,417	9,329,207	8,251,267
Percentage	61.53%	17.82%	15.67%
- A map showing the results of the Philippine vice presidential election by city and province and by region.
Vice President before election
Leni Robredo
Liberal
Elected Vice President
Sara Duterte
Lakas

Presidential elections in the Philippines were held on May 9, 2022, as part of the 2022 general election. This was the 17th direct presidential election and 15th vice presidential election in the country since 1935, and the sixth sextennial presidential and vice presidential election since 1992.

Incumbent president Rodrigo Duterte was ineligible for re-election because the president is limited to a single term under the 1987 Philippine Constitution. Incumbent vice president Leni Robredo was eligible for re-election but chose to run for the presidency instead. Therefore, this election determined the 17th president and the 15th vice president. The president and vice president are elected separately, so the two winning candidates can come from different political parties.

The election took place amidst the COVID-19 pandemic which had caused the country's economy to fall into recession. Other key issues were the continuation of President Duterte's policies, a re-examination of the country's foreign relationships in response to its territorial dispute with China, management of the country's debt, rising inflation, and climate change.

The ticket of former senator Bongbong Marcos and Davao City mayor Sara Duterte won the presidency and vice presidency respectively, defeating incumbent vice president Leni Robredo and incumbent senator Francis Pangilinan in a landslide. It was the first election since the establishment of the Fifth Republic in 1987 where the president and vice president were elected by a majority, and the first election since 2004 where the winning president and vice president came from the same presidential ticket. The election saw the highest turnout since 1998, with about 56 million voters participating. Marcos received 31.6 million votes, the most votes ever cast for a candidate in a presidential election in the Philippines, while Duterte received 32.2 million votes, the most votes ever cast for a candidate in the country.

Marcos became the second president from Ilocos Norte after his father, former president Ferdinand Marcos, while Duterte became the first vice president from Davao City, the third vice president to come from Mindanao after Emmanuel Pelaez and Teofisto Guingona Jr., and the youngest to be elected. This also marked the return of the Marcos family to power for the first time since the People Power Revolution. Marcos was inaugurated on June 30, 2022, while Duterte was inaugurated earlier on June 19, 2022. The election and subsequent transfer of power marked another large-scale democratic transition conducted through the Philippines' national electoral system.

== Background ==
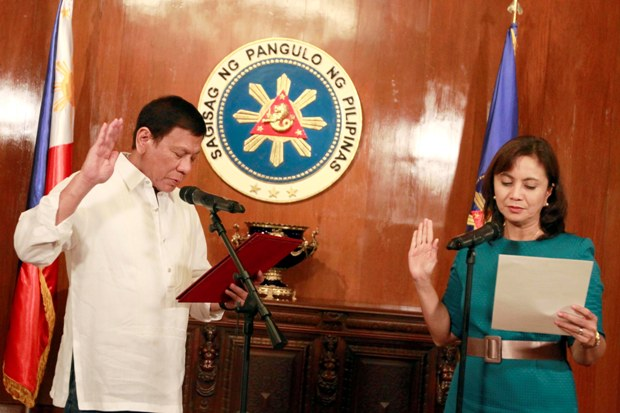
The 2022 election decided the successor of both President Rodrigo Duterte and Vice President Leni Robredo, whose terms as President and Vice President expired at noon on June 30, 2022; respectively. This photo shows Duterte inducting Robredo to head the HUDCC.

In the 2016 presidential and vice presidential elections, Davao City Mayor Rodrigo Duterte of Partido Demokratiko Pilipino–Lakas ng Bayan (transl. Philippine Democratic Party–People Power; PDP–Laban) won the presidency against four other candidates, while House representative from Camarines Sur Leni Robredo of the Liberal Party won against Senator Bongbong Marcos and four others in the closest vice-presidential election since 1965. Marcos put the result under protest in the Presidential Electoral Tribunal.

In October 2019, the Presidential Electoral Tribunal released its report on Marcos's electoral protest against Robredo on Marcos's pilot provinces of Camarines Sur, Iloilo and Negros Oriental, and showed that Robredo had increased her lead by 15,742 votes. The tribunal voted to defer making a decision on the protest and instead proceeded with Marcos's plea to nullify the votes from the Autonomous Region in Muslim Mindanao (ARMM) provinces of Basilan, Lanao del Sur and Maguindanao.

Those who dissented from the decision said that the protest should have been dismissed, as Marcos had failed to recover votes from his 3 pilot provinces, citing the rules of the tribunal. They were overruled when the others said that Marcos's plea on the ARMM provinces should also be resolved.

In July 2016, Vice President Robredo was appointed to head the Housing and Urban Development Coordinating Council (HUDCC), but resigned in December 2016 after being told to stop attending all cabinet meetings, amid her criticism of the administration's war on drugs. The president later told his allies to stop trying to impeach Robredo.

In the 17th Congress, Representative Pantaleon Alvarez from Davao del Norte was elected Speaker of the House of Representatives in July 2016. Midway during the 17th Congress, former President Gloria Macapagal Arroyo, who was the representative from Pampanga, ousted Alvarez from the speakership. The ouster was reportedly due to a dispute between Alvarez and Davao City Mayor Sara Duterte, the president's daughter, when she branded him as being from the opposition when she launched the Hugpong ng Pagbabago (transl. Alliance for Change; HNP), a regional political party in the Davao Region of which both Davao del Norte and Davao City are a part.

In the 2019 midterm Senate election, the opposition to Duterte fielded the Otso Diretso (transl. Straight Eight) coalition, while the administration fielded its own slate under the Hugpong ng Pagbabago banner. Hugpong won 9 of the 12 seats contested, while Otso Diretso won no seats. Cynthia Villar, wife of defeated 2010 presidential candidate Manny Villar, topped the election, while 2013's Senate election topnotcher and 2016 defeated presidential candidate Grace Poe finished second. While Sara Duterte's Hugpong won in the Davao Region, they notably failed to unseat Alvarez, and PDP–Laban defeated Hugpong's candidate for governor of Davao del Norte, and won both of the province's seats in the House of Representatives.

Administration-allied parties also won in the House of Representatives, but there was a dispute on who should be Speaker. President Duterte brokered a term-sharing agreement between Alan Peter Cayetano and Lord Allan Velasco, with the former serving the first 15 months of the term and Velasco the final 18 months. Meanwhile, Tito Sotto was re-elected as Senate President.

In November 2019, the president challenged Robredo to co-chair the Inter-Agency Committee on Anti-Illegal Drugs (ICAD), the office that oversees the war on drugs, along with the Philippine Drug Enforcement Agency chief, which she accepted. A week later, Duterte said that he would fire Robredo if she shared state secrets about the drug war. Several days later, Duterte said he could not trust Robredo after she asked the government for a list of high-value targets in the drug war. Robredo replied, "He should tell me straight if he wants me out." A day later, Duterte fired Robredo as co-chair of the ICAD.

During the COVID-19 pandemic in the Philippines, the government was criticized by the opposition for its response to the pandemic. Robredo had a televised speech in August claiming that the government had no plans on how to resolve the pandemic and shared ten recommendations on how to resolve it. Duterte himself, in a separate speech days later, asked Robredo not to "add fuel to the fire".

In June 2020, American boxing promoter Bob Arum said that Senator Manny Pacquiao had confided to him that he would run for president in 2022. Pacquiao later denied talking about politics with Arum. On December 3, 2020, Pacquiao was elected party president of PDP–Laban, of which President Duterte is the party chairman. On May 3, 2021, when Pacquiao was asked about his intentions of running for president, he replied "for now, let's not think about that."

In March 2021, former Supreme Court Associate Justice Antonio Carpio launched "1Sambayan" (read as "isambayan", meaning "one nation"), a coalition that aimed to place one lone candidate against Duterte's endorsed successor. Carpio aimed to avoid Vote splitting, pointing out that Duterte had won over Mar Roxas and Grace Poe in 2016 as those who were against him were not united.

1Sambayan considered Robredo, Moreno, Poe, and Senator Nancy Binay as candidates. Both Moreno and Pacquiao, with the former being one of 1Sambayan's choices, stated that they did not want to talk about politics during the pandemic. Former senator Antonio Trillanes IV said that there was never an offer from 1Sambayan for him to run, but if that Robredo did not seek the presidency in 2022, he would consider entering the presidential race.

A dispute within the PDP–Laban began on March 12, 2021 when Senator Pacquiao began to criticize President Duterte and the government regarding the dispute in the South China Sea, alleged corruption in the government agencies under the Duterte administration, the government handling of the COVID-19 pandemic, and the endorsement of candidates for the 2022 presidential election, leading to the creation of two factions within the party.

On March 23, 2021, Senate President Tito Sotto stated that he and Panfilo Lacson were being pushed to form a tandem. Sotto said both of them were yet to be convinced on this, and when asked if he would run for higher office in 2022, he said that he had not yet made a decision. Lacson later declined the offer from 1Sambayan in a letter to Justice Carpio, in which he cited his principal sponsorship of the Anti-Terrorism Law as "inconsistent and incongruent" to the goals of the coalition.

On June 12, 2021, 1Sambayan announced their six initial nominees to go through the coalition's selection process for a presidential and vice-presidential tandem. The nominees (whom members of the coalition may vote for as their candidate for either post) included: senator Poe, vice president Robredo, former Senator Trillanes, human rights lawyer and former senatorial candidate Chel Diokno, incumbent house deputy speaker Vilma Santos-Recto, and CIBAC representative and house deputy speaker Eddie Villanueva. Moreno and Binay declined 1Sambayan's offer to run under their coalition. Soon after, Senator Poe and Congressman Santos also withdrew their names from contention. At the same time, Vice President Robredo, former Senator Trillanes, and Congressman Villanueva expressed their support for unity in 2022 under 1Sambayan.

Lacson and Sotto formally announced their candidacies on July, with their campaign to be launched in August. Lacson was later sworn in as a member of the Partido para sa Demokratikong Reporma (transl. Party for Democratic Reforms), the party of former secretary of Defense Renato de Villa who lost the 1998 presidential election. On September 8, Lacson and Sotto formally launched their tandem via social media, in a taped production in an undisclosed studio. The tandem filed their candidacies on October 6.

Isko Moreno, who had returned to the political limelight after being elected Mayor of Manila, was expected to take his oath as a member of Aksyon Demokratiko (transl. Democratic Action), the party founded by Senator Raul Roco after resigning from the National Unity Party. However, this did not happen as an unexpectedly large number of people turned up on vaccination sites, particularly in Manila. Moreno was subsequently elected party president a week later. He later announced his presidential bid on September 22 with Dr. Willie Ong as his running mate. They filed their certificates of candidacy (COCs) on October 4.

On September 30, 2021, 1Sambayan nominated Robredo as their standard bearer. On October 7, Robredo accepted the nomination and announced that she would run for President. She later filed her certificate of candidacy on the same day as an independent. Robredo explained that she was running as an independent to show that she is open to making alliances. After Vice-President Robredo announced her presidential candidacy, several sources from the Liberal Party indicated that Senator Francis Pangilinan would be her running mate for her presidential bid. Pangilinan filed his candidacy for vice president a day after Robredo.

Back in January 2020, Bongbong Marcos had confirmed that he would be running "for a national position" in 2022, although he did not specify which position. On September 21, 2021, the Partido Federal ng Pilipinas (PFP; transl. Federal Party of the Philippines) nominated Marcos to run for president. During the national convention of the Kilusang Bagong Lipunan (KBL; transl. New Society Movement) in Binangonan, the party founded by his father, he had already been nominated as that party's candidate for president. Marcos, who was still a member of the Nacionalista Party, thanked the KBL for the nomination, but said that he would announce his own plans "when the time comes." On October 5, Marcos announced his presidential candidacy. Marcos then resigned from the Nacionalistas and was sworn in at the PFP chairman. Marcos ultimately filed his presidential candidacy under the PFP on October 6.

Davao City mayor Sara Duterte, despite being a frontrunner in early opinion polls, did not file a candidacy for a national position; instead she nominated for re-election in the Davao mayoral race, despite having previously stated on July 9, 2021, that she was open to running for president. On the final day for the filing of candidacies, Mayor Duterte did not show up; instead, Ronald dela Rosa filed his candidacy for president, stating that he was open to being substituted by Duterte. Dela Rosa was running alongside Go, who had earlier filed his candidacy for the vice presidency on October 2, despite calls from the PDP-Laban Cusi wing for him to run for president. At the end of the period for the filing of the Certificates of Canvass (COCs), a total of 97 individuals had manifested their intention to run for President, and 29 did for Vice-President.

On November 9, Duterte withdrew from the mayoral race in Davao. On November 11, she resigned from Hugpong ng Pagbabago and joined Lakas–CMD on the same day. She filed her candidacy for the vice presidential post on November 13, 2021, substituting Lyle Fernando Uy. Partido Federal ng Pilipinas adopted Duterte as their vice presidential candidate. Dela Rosa and Go both withdrew their candidacies on the same day. A few days later, Go launched his campaign for the presidential post. Go explained that he withdrew his bid to run for vice president, to avoid complicating Sara Duterte's vice presidential campaign. President Duterte was reported to be his running mate and was to file his candidacy on November 15, but filed for senator instead.

Upon filing his candidacy on November 15 via substitution, presidential aspirant and former National Task Force to End Local Communist Armed Conflict (NTF-ELCAC) spokesperson Antonio Parlade Jr. accused fellow presidential aspirant Senator Bong Go of controlling Duterte's decisions. Defense Secretary Delfin Lorenzana dismissed Parlade's claim, calling it baseless.

On November 18, 2021, President Duterte claimed that an unnamed presidential aspirant from a well-known family was using cocaine adding that the aspirant was a "weak leader" and "not a very strong leader, except for his name, the father." The next day, presidential aspirants reacted to Duterte's statement. Leni Robredo and Leody de Guzman said that the government should file charges against the candidate allegedly using cocaine. Isko Moreno and Panfilo Lacson denied that the statement alluded to them. A report speculated that his statement was alluded to Bongbong Marcos, but Marcos's camp dismissed Duterte's claims. Lacson and Sotto, Marcos and Duterte, and Moreno and Ong all subsequently took drug tests and tested negative, while Pacquiao presented a negative drug test from the Voluntary Anti-Doping Association. Robredo, Go, and de Guzman expressed their willingness to undergo a drug test.

On November 30, 2021, Go announced his intention to withdraw his candidacy for the presidency, without any substitute. He had earlier expressed his doubts about his presidential run on November 25. The COMELEC stated that Go had to personally file his statement of withdrawal, which he did on December 14.

On January 17, 2022, the commission's second division dismissed the petition cancelling Marcos's candidacy. The petitioners cited Marcos's conviction on violating the National Internal Revenue Code when he had failed to file income tax returns in the early 1980s during his tenure as governor of Ilocos Norte, which allegedly carried the punishment of perpetual disqualification from public office. The commission ruled that when the crime was committed, it did not carry the punishment cited by the petitioners, so Marcos did not misrepresent certificate of candidacy where he stated that he was not convicted of a crime of moral turpitude. Marcos faced a separate disqualification case in the first division; its release of the decision was delayed when several of its staffers tested positive for COVID-19.

On January 22, 2022, The Jessica Soho Presidential Interviews premiered on GMA. Moreno, Robredo, Lacson, and Pacquiao participated in the interview, while Marcos refused to take part; his camp stated that Soho was "biased" against him. GMA later responded to the allegation and refuted his camp's statement. In a separate interview in One PH, Marcos equated bias with being "anti-Marcos," adding that it was useless as he was not going to answer issues about his father's presidency.

On January 23, 2022, as part of its efforts against online disinformation, Twitter suspended more than 300 accounts. Rappler alleged that the accounts were linked to Marcos, which his campaign denied.

== Electoral system ==
Logo for the 2022 NLE used for public materials and election awareness campaigns.

According to the Constitution of the Philippines of 1987, the election is held every six years after 1992, on the second Monday of May. The incumbent president is term-limited. The incumbent vice president may run for two consecutive terms. The first-past-the-post voting system is used to determine the winner: the candidate with the highest number of votes, whether or not one has a majority, wins the presidency.

The vice-presidential election is separate, is held on the same rules, and voters may split their ticket. According to the Constitution, if two or more candidates get the most votes for either position, Congress shall vote from among them which shall be president or vice president, as the case may be.

Both winners will serve six-year terms commencing at noon on June 30, 2022, and ending on the same day, six years later.

== Tickets ==
The Commission on Elections released the official list of candidates on January 25, 2022, although it was finalized nine days before. Candidates who appeared on the ballot could still have been disqualified until their proclamation.

The presidential election featured the most candidates since 1992 with ten candidates running for president, while the vice presidential election featured the most candidates since 1998, with nine candidates running for vice president. This is ordered by the surname of the presidential candidate.

Presidential candidate			Vice presidential candidate			Campaign
#	Candidate name and party	Most recent political position	#	Candidate name and party	Most recent political position	Campaign
1	Ernesto Abella; Independent	Undersecretary of Foreign Affairs (2017–2021)	none			
2	Leody de Guzman; PLM	No prior public office	2	Walden Bello; PLM	House representative for Akbayan (2007–2015)	Details
3	Norberto Gonzales; PDSP	Secretary of National Defense (2009–2010)	none			
4	Panfilo Lacson; Independent (Note: Originally ran under Partido para sa Demokratikong Reporma; resigned from the party mid-way through the campaign. Still labeled as a Reporma candidate on the official ballots.)	Senator (2016–2022)	9	Tito Sotto; NPC	Senate President (2019–2022)	Details
5	Faisal Mangondato; Katipunan	No prior public office	8	Carlos Serapio; Katipunan	Councilman of Catanghalan, Obando, Bulacan	
6	Bongbong Marcos; PFP	Senator (2010–2016)	4	Sara Duterte; Lakas	Mayor of Davao City (2016–2022)	Details
7	Jose Montemayor Jr. DPP	No prior public office	3	Rizalito David; DPP	Chief of Strategic Planning Section of DENR (1990–1992)	
8	Isko Moreno; Aksyon	Mayor of Manila (2019–2022)	6	Willie Ong; Aksyon	Consultant for the Department of Health (2010–2014)	Details
9	Manny Pacquiao; PROMDI	Senator (2016–2022)	1	Lito Atienza; PROMDI	House representative for Buhay (2013–2022)	Details
10	Leni Robredo; Independent (Note: Liberal Party member running as an independent)	Vice President (2016–2022)	7	Francis Pangilinan; Liberal	Senator (2016–2022)	Details
none			5	Manny SD Lopez; WPP	No prior public office	

== Issues ==
The election was held amidst the COVID-19 pandemic, which had severely damaged the country's economy and halted daily activities. Finance secretary Carlos Dominguez III predicted that the succeeding administration would face four main issues: debt management, inflation caused by global shortages, pandemic-induced inequalities, and climate change. Other key issues included the continuation of President Rodrigo Duterte's policies and a re-examination of the country's foreign relationships, particularly the United States, in light of its territorial dispute in the South China Sea with China.

Former senator Bongbong Marcos, despite not being endorsed but instead criticized by the outgoing President, promised broad continuity of his policies, vowing to promote foreign investment and continue infrastructure development alongside some of Duterte's programs. He focused his messaging mainly on ushering unity among Filipinos. Being the son and namesake of former president Ferdinand Marcos, Marcos's candidacy faced stiff opposition from various groups due to his father's regime's human rights abuses and widespread corruption during his tenure.

Incumbent vice president Leni Robredo was considered from the outset to be Marcos's rival, having won by a narrow margin against him in the 2016 vice-presidential election. Robredo, a critic of Duterte's policies, offered a platform based on good governance and transparency. She drew on her experience as a human rights lawyer and development worker.

Meanwhile, Manila Mayor Isko Moreno positioned himself as a centrist alternative to both Marcos and Robredo, promising to make an "inclusive and open government" including many viewpoints. He drew on his experience as Mayor, vowing to duplicate in the country what he had done in Manila. Senator Manny Pacquiao ran on an anti-corruption platform and positioned himself as the candidate of the masses, pledging to initiate programs for the poor if elected.

Senator Ping Lacson, banking on his long tenure as a government official, campaigned on a law-and-order platform similar to Duterte's in 2016; his messaging was centered around restoring trust in the government.

== Presidential election ==
=== Candidates ===
==== Ernesto Abella (Independent) ====
Ernesto Abella said he was running since "ordinary people were being set aside", and that he was running as an independent since the ruling PDP–Laban did not choose him as their standard bearer. He later said that he was confident of not being declared as a nuisance candidate.

His platform was centered on three main pillars: "a fair society, a government that is felt by the people, and a strong nation." He promised to push for more public participation in government affairs and to prioritize job creation and the agricultural sector in the country.

==== Leody de Guzman (PLM) ====
Leody de Guzman, chairman of the Bukluran ng Manggagawang Pilipino, a progressive labor group, ran unsuccessfully for Senator in 2019. De Guzman ran for president this time under the Partido Lakas ng Masa.

According to his running mate, their vision for the country was democratic socialism. He ran on a platform based on labor and social issues. Some of his advocacies included repealing the TRAIN and CREATE taxation laws as well as the Anti-Terrorism Act of 2020, pushing for the increase of the minimum wage, implementing a universal basic income, and legalizing divorce and same-sex marriage, among others.

==== Norberto Gonzales (PDSP) ====
Former secretary of National Defense Norberto Gonzales said that his campaign was a "new and more politically mature approach to winning the nation's heart and its consent to govern." He filed his candidacy on October 6, 2021, under the Partido Demokratiko Sosyalista ng Pilipinas. His platform focused on making significant changes in the country's government, such as making all regions autonomous and shifting from a presidential system to a parliamentary system.

==== Panfilo Lacson (Independent) ====
In July 2021, Senate President Tito Sotto confirmed that Panfilo Lacson would run for president in a tandem with him. On September 8, the duo announced their candidacies for the upcoming election. He filed his candidacy under the Partido para sa Demokratikong Reporma. On March 24, 2022, Lacson resigned from Partido Reporma and became an independent candidate after the said party switched its endorsement to Robredo.

If elected, he promised to restore trust in the government, with a platform that revolveed around addressing corruption. He planned to initiate an anti-corruption drive, reform the national budget, and digitalize government services.

==== Faisal Mangondato (Katipunan) ====
Faisal Mangondato, who ran for Senator in 2019 and lost, filed to run for president on October 4 under the Katipunan ng Kamalayang Kayumanggi. He planned to push for federalism in the Philippines, proposing a provisional government for three years to complete the shift.

==== Bongbong Marcos (PFP) ====
On October 5, 2021, Marcos announced his presidential candidacy. Initially nominated by four parties, Marcos chose to run under the Partido Federal ng Pilipinas. He resigned from the Nacionalista Party and was sworn in as the PFP chairman the same day. Marcos ultimately filed his presidential candidacy under the PFP on October 6.

Marcos faced seven petitions against his bid. The electoral commission dismissed the petition declaring him a nuisance candidate in early December. They also dismissed another petition which claims that the real Bongbong Marcos had died decades earlier, and that an impostor had taken his place. The consolidated disqualification case against him was dismissed on February 10, 2022, although one of the petitioners have filed a motion for reconsideration. The last petition against his candidacy was dismissed on April 20, 2022.

His platform is centered on uniting the country, emphasizing the need for unity to recover from the pandemic. If elected, he promised to prioritize job creation, infrastructure development, modernization of the agricultural and industrial sectors, improving healthcare, lower price of rice to ₱20.00 per kilogram and support for small and medium-sized enterprises. He also promised to continue President Duterte's policies.

==== Jose Montemayor Jr. (DPP) ====
Cardiologist Jose Montemayor Jr. filed his candidacy on October 1, 2021, under the Democratic Party of the Philippines. He vowed to eliminate COVID-19, corruption, and criminality once elected.

==== Isko Moreno (Aksyon) ====
At the start of 2021, pollster Pulse Asia published an opinion poll showing Isko Moreno in second place for president, and statistically tied for first with President Duterte in the vice presidential race. The 1Sambayan convenors' group then included Moreno as one of the people they would consider choosing as its presidential candidate. Moreno begged off, as he was concentrating on his mayoral duties. By June, Moreno informed them that he was declining their offer. On September, Moreno was named president of Aksyon Demokratiko, the party founded by the late Raul Roco. Moreno announced his candidacy on September 22 with Dr. Willie Ong as his running mate.

Some of Moreno proposed policies include maintaining the Duterte administration's "Build! Build! Build! Program", additional public housing, development of agriculture, tourism and creative industries, strengthening of policies in healthcare and education, maintaining peaceful international relations, and ending divisive politics in favor of an "open governance" rooted in "competence" over "connections".

==== Manny Pacquiao (PROMDI) ====
On September 19, Pacquiao accepted the nomination of the PDP-Laban faction led by Senator Koko Pimentel. On October 1, 2021, Pacquiao filed his certificate of candidacy for the presidency under PROMDI, the party founded by the late Cebu governor Lito Osmeña.

His platform is centered around the impoverished. If elected, he plans to initiate housing programs for the poor, eliminating corruption, promote economic development, and work for healthcare reform.

==== Leni Robredo (Independent) ====
On September 30, 2021, the 1Sambayan coalition (the coalition of the opposition), nominated Robredo as their standard bearer. According to Armin Luistro, one of the conveyors of 1Sambayan, Robredo accepted the nomination and said she would file her candidacy on October 5. Robredo's spokesman clarified that she had not reached a decision yet, but would finalize a decision on this before October 8. On October 7, Robredo accepted the nomination and announced that she would run for president. She later filed her certificate of candidacy the same day as an independent. Robredo explained that while she did not resign as chairperson of the Liberal Party, she was running as an independent to show that she was open to making alliances.

Her platform focused on good governance and transparency. She promised to prioritize healthcare and the economy. Some of her proposals included improving the quality of education in the country, developing the country's industries, supporting small and medium-sized enterprises, providing stable employment, strengthening the country's healthcare system, and implementing more anti-corruption measures.

=== Debates and forums ===
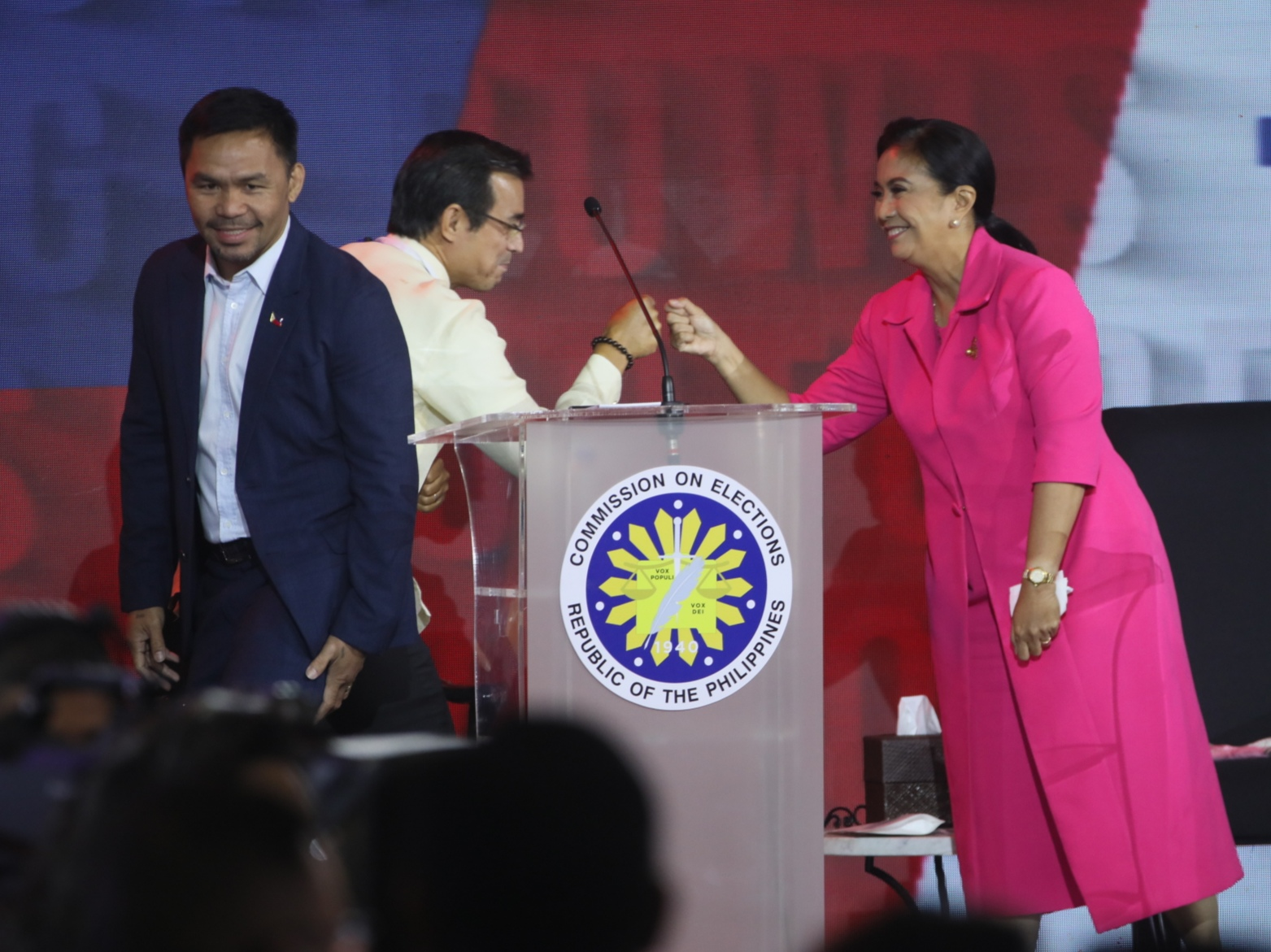
From left to right: Presidential candidates Manny Pacquiao, Isko Moreno, and Leni Robredo during the closing moments of the second PiliPinas Debates 2022 on April 3, 2022.

The Commission on Elections (COMELEC) confirmed that they would organize debates for candidates running for both President and Vice-President. Unlike the debates in the 2016 elections, three presidential and three vice-presidential debates would be held. Candidates would be required to follow safety protocols stated by Inter-Agency Task Force for the Management of Emerging Infectious Diseases (IATF) with no audience participation due to the risks of the ongoing COVID-19 pandemic.

A few weeks later, the commission said that in addition to the three debates for each position, they would hold a primary debate, as a teaser of sorts for the upcoming debates per position. They would also organize the debates themselves, a deviation from 2016 where they let the media organizations organize it. By January 2022, the commission said they might forego with the teaser debate, as the number of candidates had been reduced to a more manageable number.

The commission, by law, could not compel candidates to join debates, but expected them to do so as it would present them with massive exposure, and that it would not count towards the limits of the airtime that they were allowed to advertise on broadcast networks.

The presidential debate organized by Sonshine Media Network International (SMNI) was noted for the absences of several candidates. Manny Pacquiao declined to participate due to the indictment of Apollo Quiboloy, leader of the Kingdom of Jesus Christ which is affiliated with SMNI, allegedly for sex trafficking by the United States federal government. Panfilo Lacson on his part declined due to Quiboloy having already openly endorsed the candidacy of Bongbong Marcos while Leni Robredo and Isko Moreno cited scheduling conflicts and prior commitments for their non-attendance.

This came at the heels of Marcos declining an invitation of CNN Philippines for their presidential debate, citing prior commitments. Marcos had earlier declined to join the forum organized by the Kapisanan ng mga Brodkaster ng Pilipinas (the broadcasters association) for the same reason.

SMNI had also planned to hold a vice-presidential debate on February 22, 2022. The debate was later cancelled to make way for a second presidential debate. Prior to its cancellation, two candidates, Sotto and Pangilinan, had declined to participate.

Legend
P Participated A Absent NI Not invited

Date	Organizers	Media partners	Location	Moderators	Candidates										Ref.
Date	Organizers	Media partners	Location	Moderators	Abella Ind.	De Guzman PLM	Gonzales PDSP	Lacson Ind.	Mangondato Katipunan	Marcos PFP	Montemayor DPP	Moreno Aksyon	Pacquiao PROMDI	Robredo Ind.	Ref.
PiliPinas Debates 2022
Mar 19	COMELEC	Syndication	Sofitel Philippine Plaza Manila, Pasay	Luchi Cruz-Valdez	P	P	P	P	P	A	P	P	P	P	
Apr 3	COMELEC	Syndication	Sofitel Philippine Plaza Manila, Pasay	Ces Drilon	P	P	P	P	P	A	P	P	P	P	
May 1	COMELEC	N/A	Sofitel Philippine Plaza Manila, Pasay	N/A	Cancelled										
PiliPinas Forum 2022
May 3 – 6	COMELEC and KBP	KBP member networks	Various	Various	P	P	P	A	P	A	P	A	P	A	
Other debates and forums
Feb 4	KBP	KBP member networks	TV5 Media Center, Mandaluyong	Karen Davila and Rico Hizon	NI	P	NI	P	NI	A	NI	P	P	P	
Feb 15	SMNI	SMNI and The Manila Times	Okada Manila, Parañaque	Karen Jimeno	P	P	P	A	A	P	A	A	A	A	
Feb 27	CNN Philippines	CNN Philippines and BusinessMirror	University of Santo Tomas, Manila	Pia Hontiveros and Pinky Webb	P	P	P	P	P	A	P	P	P	P	
Mar 26	SMNI	SMNI and The Manila Times	Okada Manila, Parañaque	Karen Jimeno	P	P	P	A	A	P	P	A	A	A	

=== Opinion polling ===
Opinion polling, commonly known as "surveys" in the Philippines, is conducted by Social Weather Stations (SWS), Pulse Asia, OCTA Research, and other third-party pollsters.

The tables below the latest six polls that were administered.

Fieldwork date(s)	Pollster	Sample size	MoE	Abella Ind.	De Guzman PLM	Gonzales PDSP	Lacson Ind. (Note: Originally ran under Partido para sa Demokratikong Reporma; resigned from the party mid-way through the campaign. Still labeled as a Reporma candidate on the official ballots.)	Mangondato Katipunan	Marcos PFP	Montemayor DPP	Moreno Aksyon	Pacquiao PROMDI	Robredo Ind.	Others	Und./ None	Ref.
May 9	Election results	56,097,722	N/A	0.21	0.17	0.17	1.66	0.56	58.77	0.11	3.59	6.81	27.94	N/A		
Exit poll	Publicus Asia	29,024		—	—	—	3	—	58	—	6	7	25	1	—	—
May 2–5	Publicus Asia	1,500	±3.0%	1	2	1	4	—	54	—	8	2	22	0	6 / 0	—
Apr 22–30	Mobilis–TruthWatch	2,400	±2%	—	—	—	2	—	55	—	3	5	32	1	—	—
Apr 22–25	OCTA	2,400	±2%	—	0.2	0.2	2	1	58	—	8	5	25	—	0.1 / 0.04	0.3
Apr 19–21	Publicus Asia	1,500	±3.0%	1	2	0	4	—	57	—	6	2	21	0	6 / 0	—
Apr 16–21	Pulse Asia	2,400	±2.0%	1	0.3	0.1	2	1	56	0.1	4	7	23	—	— / 1	5

=== Campaign ===
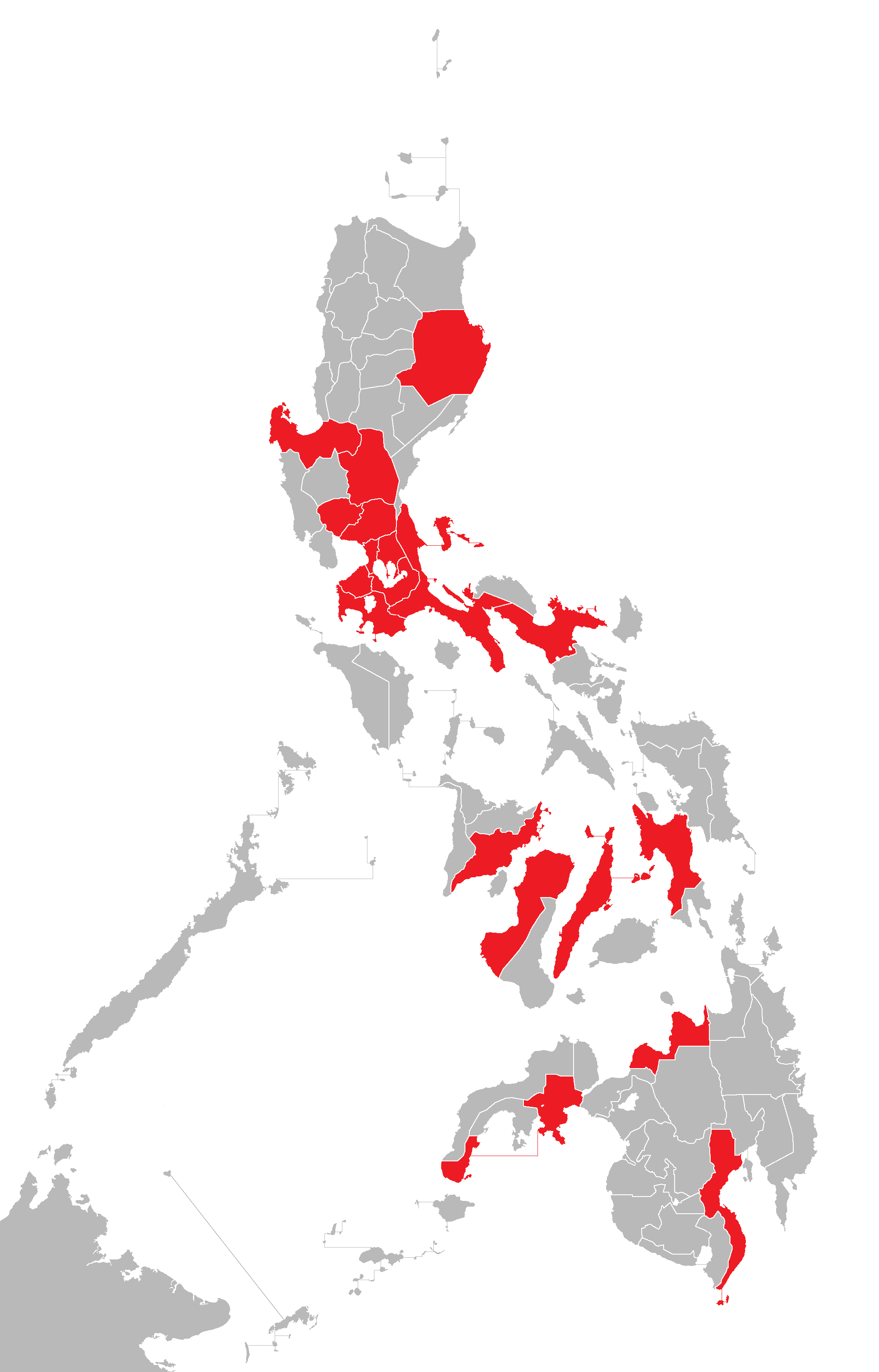
"Vote-rich provinces," or provinces and Metro Manila as a whole that have more than one million voters. Nationally elected candidates and parties typically campaign in these areas to reduce costs.

Candidates began their campaign-related activities such as motorcades, gatherings and caravans as early as late 2021, even before the mandated start of the campaign period by the COMELEC.

Ticket	Colors	Campaign manager	Slogan		Details
Ticket	Colors	Campaign manager	Original Tagalog	English translation	Details
Abella		Johnwin Dionisio	"Bagong Pilipino, Bagong Pilipinas"	"New Filipino, New Philippines"	
de Guzman/Bello	Red	Sonny Melencio	"Manggagawa Naman!"	"Workers' turn!"	Details
Gonzales	Blue and red		"Puso, Giting at Dangal ng Pilipino"	"Heart, Courage and Honor of the Filipino"	
Lacson/Sotto	Blue	Ronaldo Puno	"Aayusin ang Gobyerno, Aayusin ang Buhay Mo"	"[We'll] fix the government,[We'll] fix your life"	Details
Marcos/Duterte	Red and green	Benjamin Abalos Jr.	"Sama-sama tayong babangon muli."	"Together we will rise again."	Details
Montemayor/David			"Sa gabay ng Diyos, ang Bansa ay aayos"	"With God's guidance, the nation will be orderly."	
Moreno/Ong	White and blue	Lito Banayo	"Tunay Na Solusyon, Mabilis Umaksyon!"	"Real solution, quick to take action!"	Details
Pacquiao/Atienza	Blue	Salvador Zamora II	"Panalo ang Mahirap, Panalo ang Pilipino!"	"The poor win, the Filipino wins!"	Details
Robredo/Pangilinan	Pink and green	Bam Aquino	"Gobyernong Tapat, Angat Buhay Lahat"	"[With an] honest government, is a better life for all"	Details

==== Start of campaign period for national positions ====
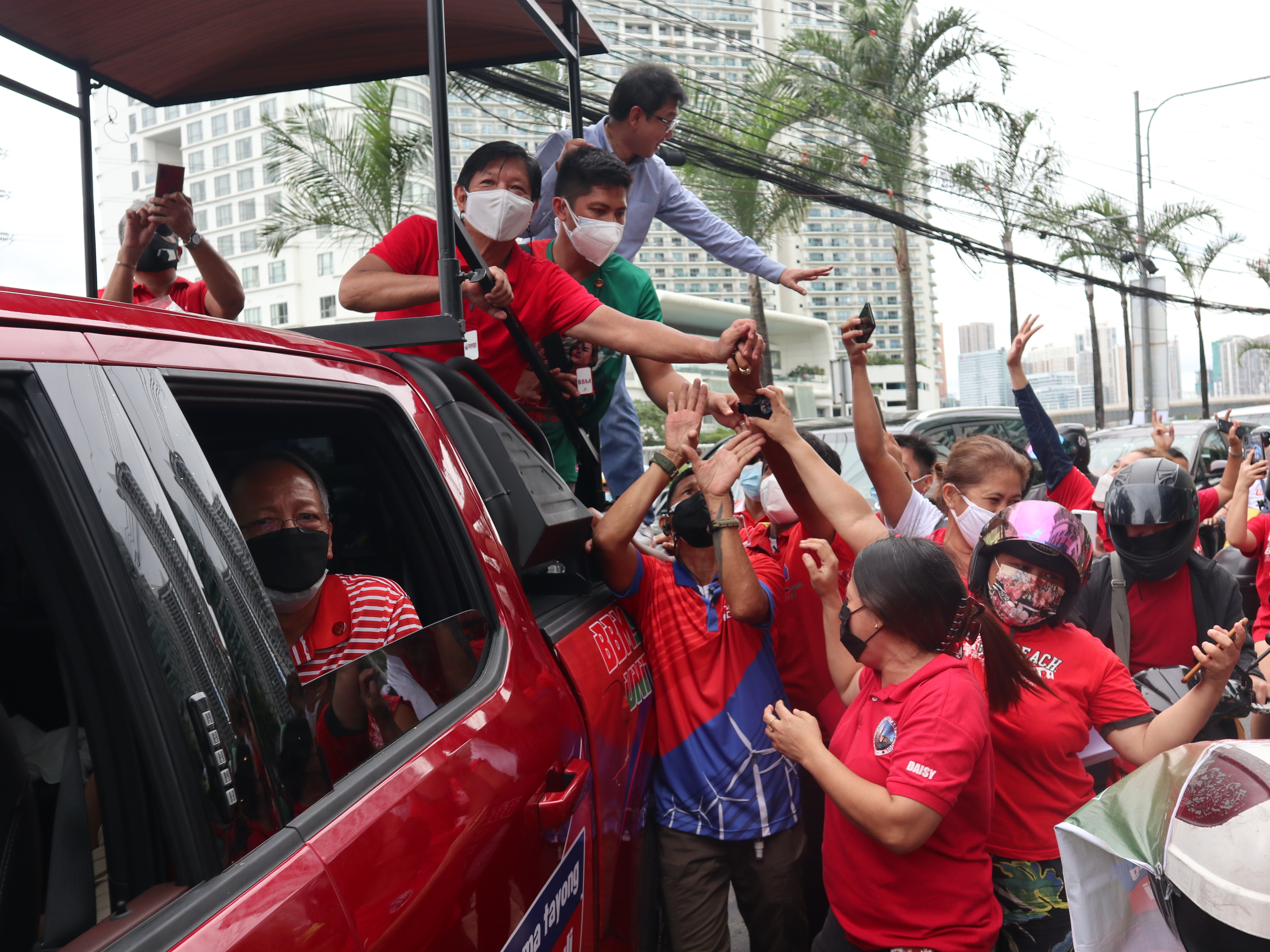
Bongbong Marcos campaigning in Makati

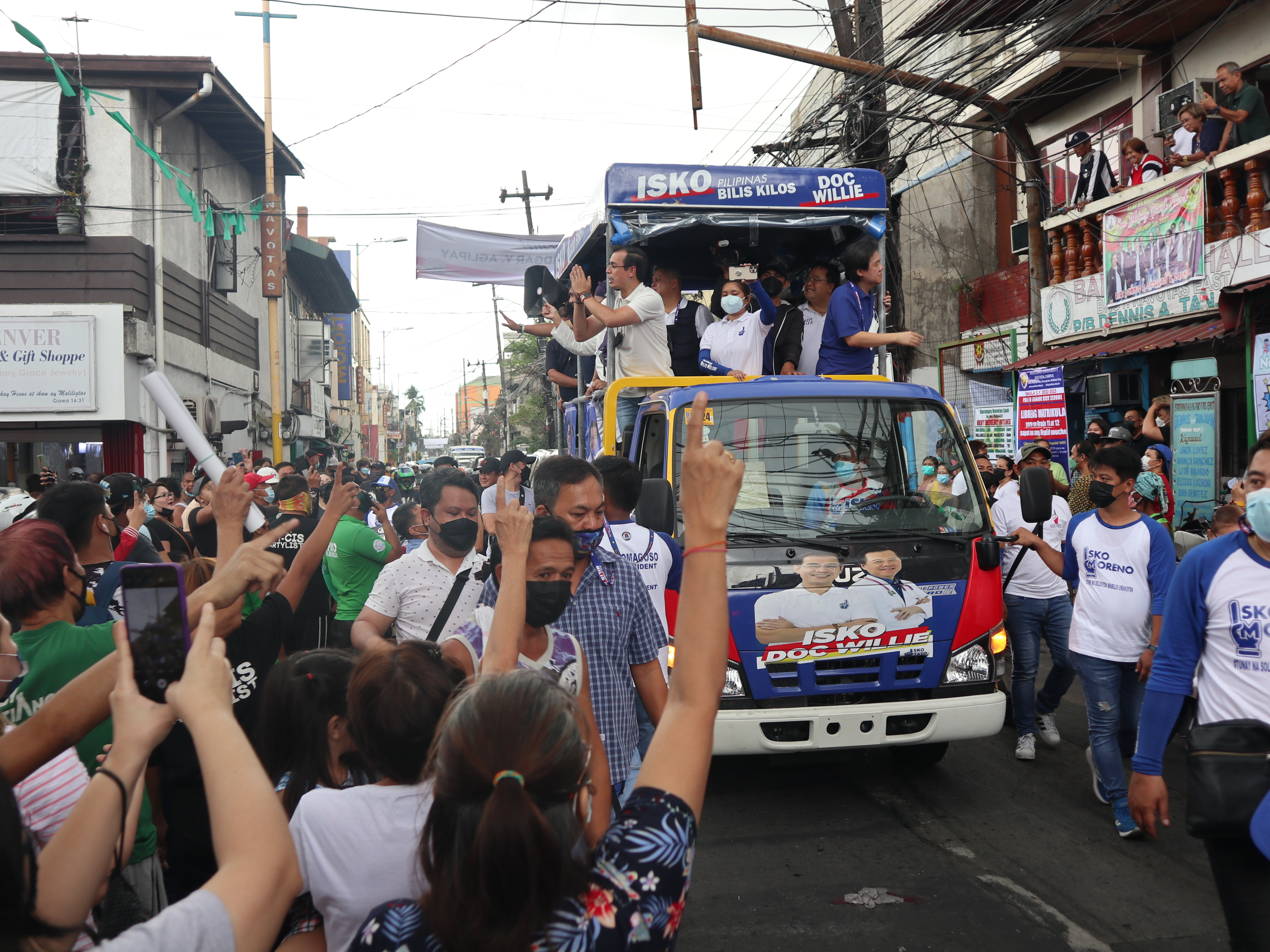
Isko Moreno and Willie Ong campaigning in Navotas

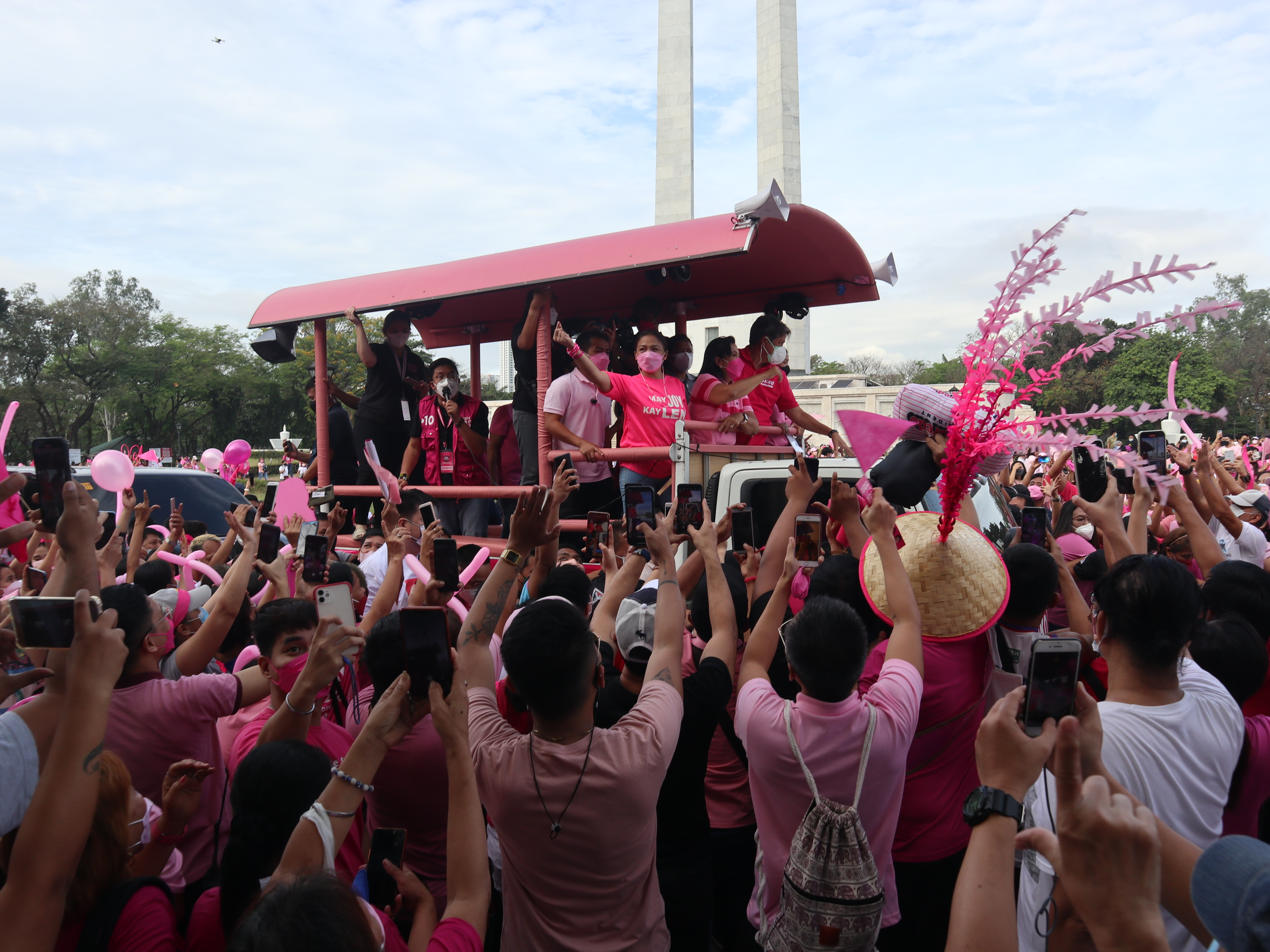
Leni Robredo and Francis Pangilinan campaigning at the Quezon Memorial Circle

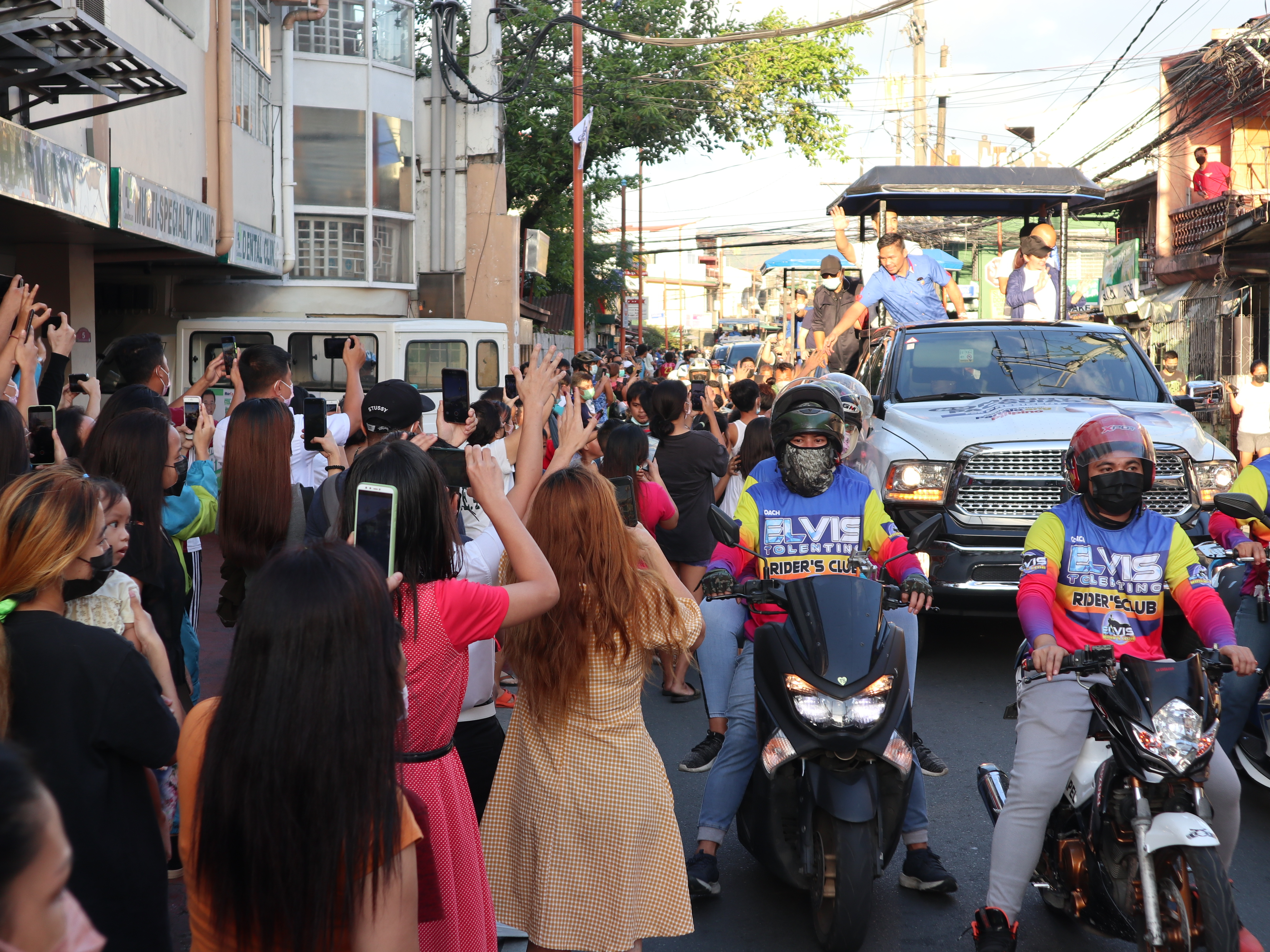
Manny Pacquiao campaigning in Marikina

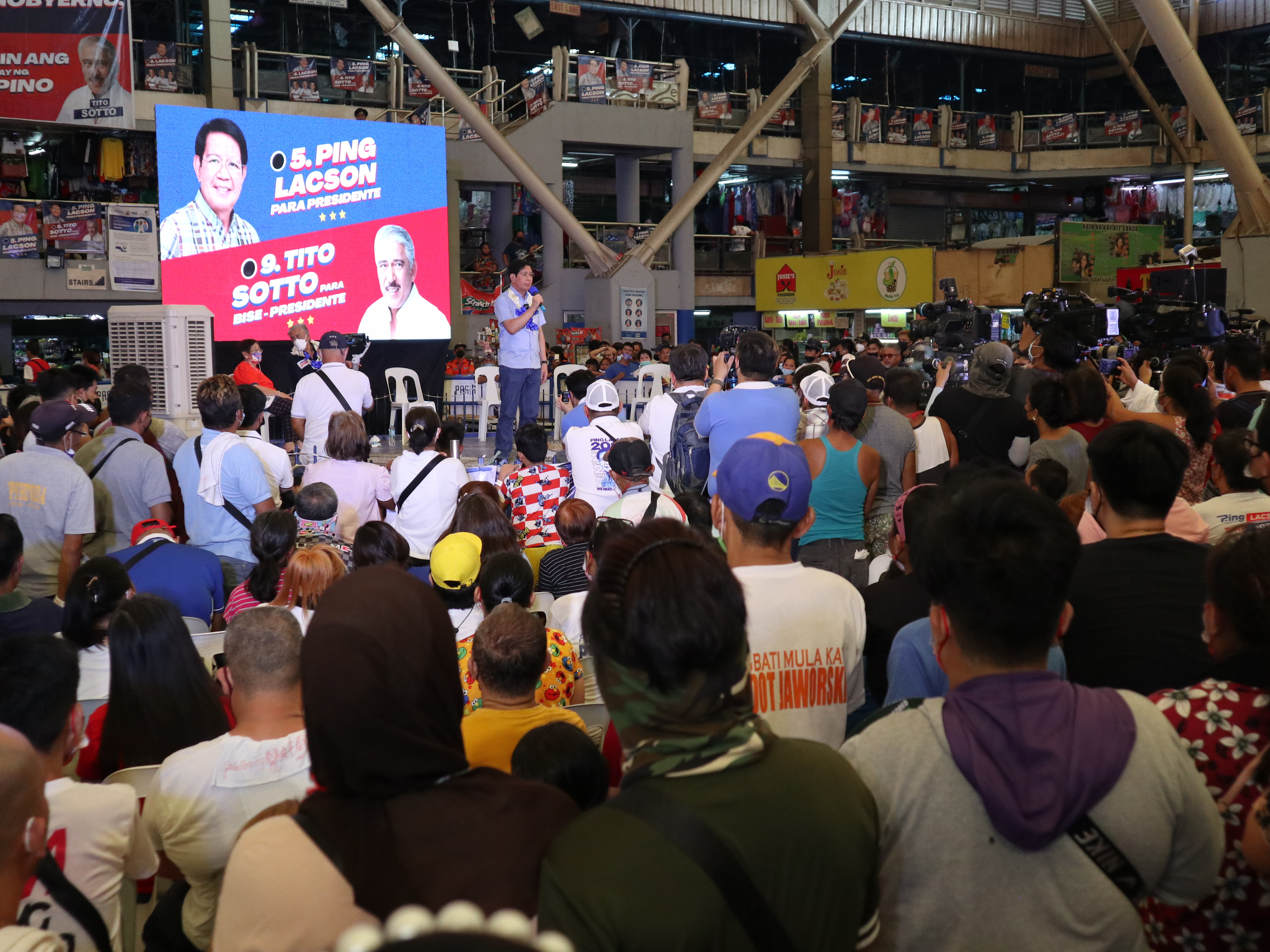
Panfilo Lacson and Tito Sotto at a town hall meeting in Pasig

Presidential tickets held their proclamation rallies on February 8, 2022, the start of the campaign period for national positions. The ticket of Faisal Mangondato and Carlos Serapio had already held their prayer proclamation during the previous weekend in Baguio. The Marcos and Duterte tandem started their campaign at the Philippine Arena in Bulacan. Robredo and Pangilinan held their rally in Plaza Quezon, Naga, Robredo's hometown, on February 8.

Isko Moreno and Willie Ong kicked off their campaign at the Kartilya ng Katipunan just outside Manila City Hall. The Lacson and Sotto tandem held their proclamation rally at the Imus Grandstand in Imus, Cavite, Lacson's hometown. Pacquiao and Atienza commenced their campaign at the Oval Plaza in General Santos, where Pacquiao grew up. The de Guzman and Bello tandem launched their campaign at the Bantayog ng mga Bayani in Quezon City.

Ernesto Abella had his proclamation rally in Dasmariñas, Cavite, while the Montemayor and David ticket started their campaign in Pasay. President Duterte, on his Talk to the People TV show, notably did not endorse a candidate going into the campaign period, saying that "at this time, I am saying that I am not supporting anybody."

While most tickets had their proclamation rallies in the respective hometowns of the presidential candidate, the Marcos campaign explained that they had chosen the Philippine Arena to seat their thousands of supporters, for which 25,000 tickets were made available. Meanwhile, Lito Atienza failed to make it to General Santos as he had suffered an injury prior to the event. Prior to their rally, the Partido Lakas ng Masa failed to secure a permit from the Commission on Elections to hold it at the Bantayog ng mga Bayani. De Guzman said the permit had been refused because required documents had not been submitted. A rally without a permit is grounds for disqualifying a candidate.

Aside from the listed presidential tickets, other tandems were pushed. Representative Joey Salceda pushed for a "Leni–Sara" (ROSA) tandem, endorsing Robredo in their campaign in Albay, while endorsing Duterte the next day. In Mindanao, an "Isko–Sara" (ISSA) tandem was promoted when Moreno had a campaign rally in there, where his running mate Willie Ong skipped. The Moreno campaign defended Ong's absence, saying that the ISSA tarpaulins would have brought him into an awkward situation.

By mid-March, the Bureau of Internal Revenue (BIR) confirmed reports that Aksyon Demokratiko, Moreno's political party, had asked if they had ordered the estate of Ferdinand Marcos, Bongbong's father and former President, to pay the ₱203 billion-peso (US$3.8 billion) tax liabilities. Marcos's camp had earlier said that the case was under litigation, with the younger Marcos himself stating that "There's a lot of fake news involved there." The Presidential Commission on Good Government, the agency tasked with recovering the ill-gotten wealth of the Marcoses, denied that the case was under litigation, saying that the judgment was "as early as 1997, the judgment on the tax case had become final and executory." In the first PiliPinas Debates 2022, Moreno, Robredo, Lacson and de Guzman called on the heirs of the elder Marcos, including the younger Marcos who did not attend the debate, to pay the estate and income taxes owed to the state.

On March 24, 2022, amid reports of Partido Reporma and its key officials rescinding their endorsement of Lacson and endorsing another candidate, Lacson resigned as Partido Reporma chairman and as party's standard bearer, making him an independent candidate, although Reporma would still be listed as his party in the ballots and would be used to determine the dominant party if he won. The party's president, Pantaleon Alvarez, later announced that they would be switching their endorsement to Robredo for president. However, some Reporma members, including founder and chairman emeritus, Renato de Villa, maintained their support for Lacson. Sources inside the party stated that Lacson already knew about the switch weeks earlier, but was permitted to resign as a way to save face. Lacson later claimed that Alvarez' withdrawal of support stemmed from his inability to provide ₱800 million in additional funding for Reporma's local candidates, which Alvarez denied. Sotto remained as Reporma's vice presidential candidate.

==== Start of campaign period for local positions ====
On March 31, Lito Atienza, who had not been able to campaign after suffering an accident, said that he was seriously considering withdrawing in order to broker a Pacquiao–Sotto tandem to defeat the Marcos–Duterte ticket. To this end, he urged Panfilo Lacson to withdraw and promised to follow suit. Lacson rebuffed the offer, saying that Atienza should learn some manners. Atienza said he felt insulted by Lacson's reply to his suggestion. A week later, Atienza publicly apologized to Lacson, saying he had not anticipated Lacson's reaction to his suggestion, and Lacson accepted Atienza's apology.

On April 9, Lacson revealed that the camp of vice president Robredo had asked him to withdraw in favor of a Robredo–Sotto tandem. He also claimed that Moreno and Pacquiao were given similar requests to withdraw in favor of Robredo. He later revealed the person who had asked him to withdraw was former Quezon City mayor Brigido "Jun" Simon Jr. Robredo's camp denied the claims, stating that no moves were made by their camp and that Simon was unauthorized to represent her campaign.

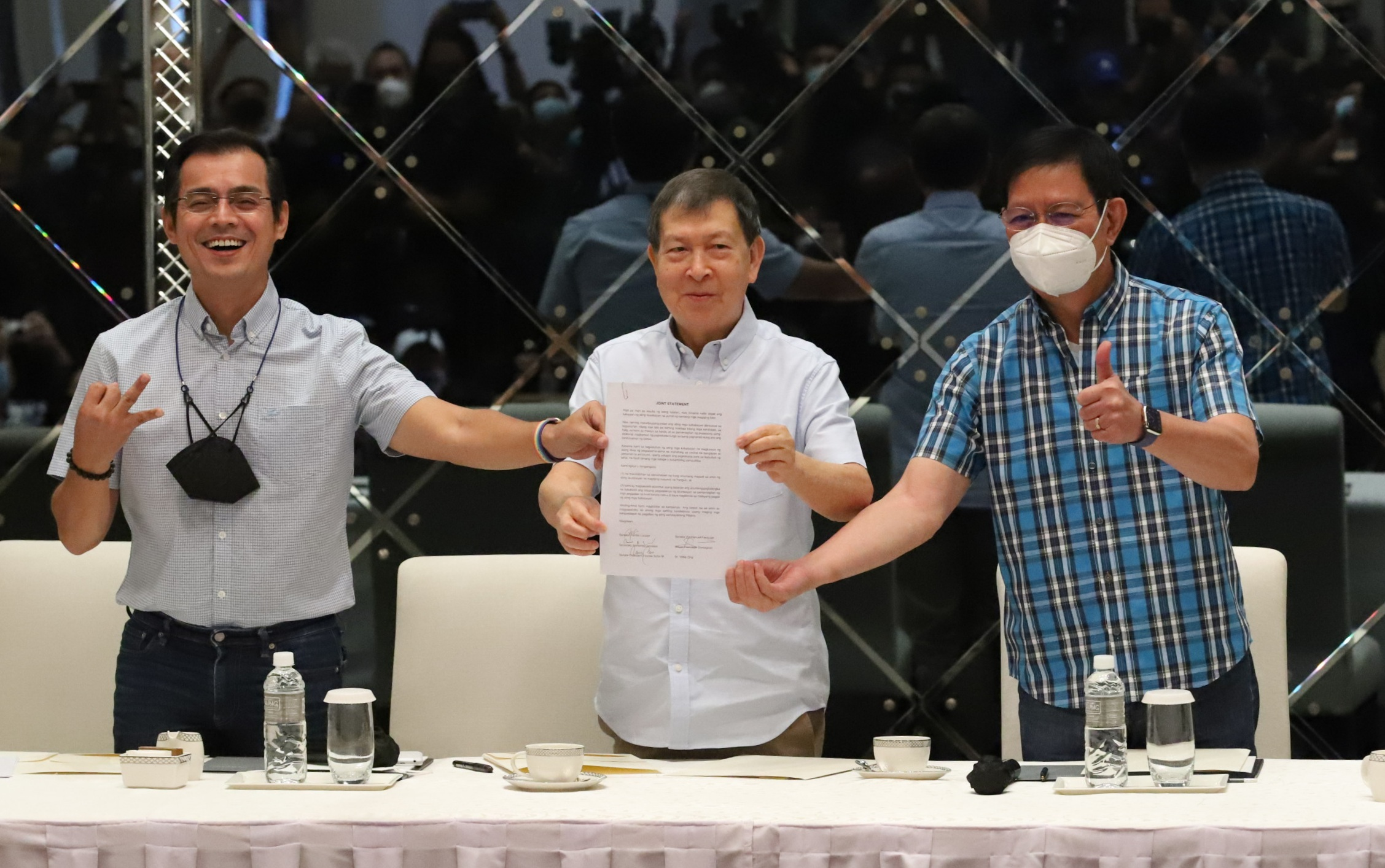
From left to right: Presidential candidates Isko Moreno, Norberto Gonzales, and Panfilo Lacson hold a joint press conference on fighting election sabotage during a press conference at The Peninsula Manila on April 17, 2022. Not present in the event is Manny Pacquiao who also signed the joint statement.

On April 17, three presidential candidates, Gonzales, Lacson, and Moreno, held a press conference affirming that they would not withdraw their candidacies despite several calls for them to back down in favor of another candidate. Abella was initially reported to attend but did not show up while Pacquiao, who committed to catch up, was not able to arrive before it ended due to commitments in General Santos. The three candidates, along with Pacquiao, signed a joint statement declaring their intention to continue their candidacies. According to Lacson, they held the press conference to remind voters that the election was not a two-way race between Marcos and Robredo. They criticized an unnamed group for allegedly offering money in exchange for their withdrawal and for stripping them of their support groups, although Moreno mentioned the "pink" and "yellow" as perpetrators; both colors were associated with the Robredo campaign.

Moreno chastised Robredo for breaking her promise not to run and called her untrustworthy after purportedly "fooling" them during unification talks. Lacson also questioned Robredo's character after some of her campaign staff were allegedly amenable to dropping her running mate, Pangilinan, in exchange for more votes in some provinces. Moreno later called for her to withdraw instead, asserting that Robredo only ran to defeat Marcos, not for the country, and that being the top second choice of Marcos voters, he had much bigger chance to defeat him since he does not have the "dilawan" baggage, claiming that not all who will vote for Marcos are loyalists, but would rather vote for Marcos instead to ensure that someone associated with the Liberal Party will not be elected president anymore. Robredo's camp later released a statement questioning the purpose of the press conference, calling the event unnecessary "theatrics," and rejected Moreno's call for her to withdraw from the race. Her camp also stated that they were thankful "that the alignments have been made even clearer."

Hours following the press conference, old photos of Moreno and Marcos dining together resurfaced. The photo, taken in February 2021 during the reopening of a restaurant in Manila, attracted allegations from Robredo's supporters that Moreno has been meeting with Marcos and secretly working for him to undermine Robredo and her campaign. Moreno denied the allegations, reiterated that it was their camp who first brought up the issue on the Marcos family's unpaid ₱203 billion estate tax, and criticized Robredo's camp for "playing dirty". Moreno later said that after months of not commenting, he only retaliated after supporters of Robredo asked him to withdraw since October 2021 when Robredo announced her candidacy, describing it as a "fair call" and a "taste of their own medicine". After being accused of toxic masculinity by Robredo supporters, Moreno also defended his criticism against Robredo as a "character issue" and has nothing to do with gender.

DPP's Rizalito David, who had earlier endorsed his rival vice presidential candidate Sotto for that position, endorsed in COMELEC's PiliPinas Forum 2022, in front of his presidential running mate Jose Montemayor, Robredo for president, calling frontrunners Marcos and Duterte as "clear and present danger" to the country. David himself did not withdraw from the election, however.

==== Miting de avance ====
Mitings de avance in Metro Manila.	Miting de avances outside Metro Manila.

The "miting de avance" is the final political rally of the candidates, usually held on the last day of the campaign period or two days before election day. Some candidates opted to hold multiple mitings de avance.

Marcos's miting de avance was held in Bay City in Pasay on May 7. Prior to that, he held two mitings de avance, one in Guimbal, Iloilo on May 3, and another on May 5 in Tagum, Davao del Norte. In total, the Marcos campaign held three mitings de avance, one for each island group of the country. Meanwhile, Robredo capped her campaign at her miting de avance in Ayala Triangle in Makati on May 7, preceded by an earlier miting de avance at Magsaysay Avenue in Naga on May 6.

Moreno held his miting de avance in Tondo, Manila. Pacquiao held two mitings de avance, one in Cebu City on May 6 and another in General Santos on May 7. The Lacson campaign held their miting de avance in Carmona, Cavite on May 6. They originally planned to hold a miting de avance in Plaza Miranda on May 7, but cancelled it due to time constraints. De Guzman held his miting de avance on May 4 at the Quezon Memorial Circle in Quezon City.

==== Campaign donations ====
According to their respective statements of campaign contributions, Bongbong Marcos and Sara Duterte got tens of millions of pesos in campaign contributions from contractors, in spite of an election ban on taking donations from firms that do business with the government. Rudhil Construction & Enterprises owner Rodulfo Hilot Jr. gave ₱20 million to Marcos's campaign, while Quirante Construction owner Jonathan Quirante contributed ₱1 million. Rudhil Construction & Enterprises and Quirante Construction were awarded substantial government contracts after the elections. Esdevco Realty Corporation, owned by Glenn Escandor, paid for advertisements worth ₱19.9 million for Sara Duterte's campaign in 2022. Genesis88 Construction, also owned by Escandor, was a major contractor for the Department of Public Works and Highways during the presidency of Rodrigo Duterte.

=== Results ===
Since the first automated election in 2010, preliminary results have been known overnight. The official results were canvassed by the Congress of the Philippines in the record time of two days. Bongbong Marcos was proclaimed president, while Davao City Mayor Sara Duterte was proclaimed vice president, in a joint session at the Batasang Pambansa Complex on May 25. All but two certificates of canvass were canvassed; those from Argentina and Syria were not included in time, as Congress deemed the votes from those certificates won't change the result.

Results per municipality Marcos 30–40% 40–50% 50–60% 60–70% 70–80% 80–90% 90–100% Robredo 30–40% 40–50% 50–60% 60–70% 70–80% 80–90% 90–100% Pacquiao 30–40% 40–50% 50–60% 60–70% Mangondato 30–40% 40–50% 50–60% 60–70% 70–80%

The election broke several records. 56,095,234 citizens cast votes, an unprecedented number. Bongbong Marcos became the first candidate in the history of the Fifth Republic to win by a majority, scoring nearly 59 percent of the vote. This was the largest majority since 1981 (surpassing his father's 18,309,360 votes, 88 percent of the total); as the opposition boycotted that election, it was the largest majority since 1969 for a competitive election. His margin of almost 31 percentage points, a ratio of more than two to one over his nearest rival was the most lopsided since 1953, when Ramon Magsaysay defeated the incumbent President Elpidio Quirino by a margin of 38 percentage points. His 31,629,783 votes was not only the highest count ever recorded in a presidential election, but close to the sum total of the two previous records combined.

Marcos won in most of Luzon, including the Solid North except for Batanes, and most of the Lingayen–Lucena corridor, including Metro Manila, except Quezon; he also won in Central Visayas, Leyte island, Aklan, Bacolod and Samar in the Visayas, and most of Mindanao except Lanao del Sur, Sarangani and the Special Geographic Area of Bangsamoro. Marcos also won among detainee voters, and in local and overseas absentee voting.

Robredo won in her home region of Bicol, and in neighboring Quezon, Batanes, and Western Visayas except Aklan and Bacolod, Northern and Eastern Samar, and in the Special Geographic Area of Bangsamoro.

Pacquiao won in his adopted home province of Sarangani, while Mangondato won in his home province of Lanao del Sur. No other candidates won a province or city canvassed by Congress. Most notably, Moreno failed to carry his home city of Manila, where he was the incumbent mayor, while Lacson failed to carry his home province of Cavite or even his hometown of Imus.

Candidate	Party	Votes	%
Bongbong Marcos	Partido Federal ng Pilipinas	31,629,783	58.77
Leni Robredo	Independent	15,035,773	27.94
Manny Pacquiao	PROMDI	3,663,113	6.81
Isko Moreno	Aksyon Demokratiko	1,933,909	3.59
Panfilo Lacson	Independent	892,375	1.66
Faisal Mangondato	Katipunan ng Kamalayang Kayumanggi	301,629	0.56
Ernesto Abella	Independent	114,627	0.21
Leody de Guzman	Partido Lakas ng Masa	93,027	0.17
Norberto Gonzales	Partido Demokratiko Sosyalista ng Pilipinas	90,656	0.17
Jose Montemayor Jr.	Democratic Party of the Philippines	60,592	0.11
Total		53,815,484	100.00
Valid votes		53,815,484	96.05
Invalid/blank votes		2,213,371	3.95
Total votes		56,028,855	100.00
Registered voters/turnout		67,523,697	82.98
Source: Congress (vote totals); COMELEC (election day turnout, absentee turnout)

Popular vote percentage
Bongbong Marcos	58.77%
Leni Robredo	27.94%
Manny Pacquiao	6.81%
Isko Moreno	3.59%
Others	2.88%

==== Result by island group and region ====
Result per island group
Island group	Marcos		Robredo		Pacquiao		Others		Total	%
Island group	Votes	%	Votes	%	Votes	%	Votes	%	Total	%
Luzon	17,452,432	57.97	9,685,756	32.17	811,394	2.70	2,157,321	7.17	30,106,903	55.94
Visayas	5,420,508	50.13	3,453,047	31.93	1,350,238	12.49	589,318	5.45	10,813,111	20.01
Mindanao	8,213,592	67.53	1,753,689	14.42	1,495,199	12.29	700,598	5.76	12,163,078	22.60
Absentee	543,251	74.17	143,281	19.56	6,282	0.86	39,578	5.40	732,392	1.36
Total	31,629,783	58.77	15,035,773	27.94	3,663,113	6.81	3,486,815	6.48	53,815,484	100

Result per region
Region	Marcos		Robredo		Pacquiao		Others		Total	%
Region	Votes	%	Votes	%	Votes	%	Votes	%	Total	%
I	2,552,114	84.69	330,436	10.96	34,528	1.15	96,491	3.20	3,013,569	5.60
CAR	748,395	83.39	88,649	9.88	20,206	2.25	40,256	4.49	897,506	1.67
II	1,608,871	86.19	168,184	9.01	31,385	1.68	58,236	3.12	1,866,676	3.47
III	3,986,906	64.79	1,652,668	26.86	110,813	1.80	403,280	6.55	6,153,667	11.43
NCR	3,287,785	55.79	1,817,465	30.84	92,728	1.57	695,397	11.80	5,893,375	10.95
IV-A	3,547,058	56.32	2,036,394	32.33	145,075	2.30	569,958	9.05	6,298,485	11.70
IV-B	712,329	44.59	530,533	33.21	223,256	13.98	206,720	7.44	1,597,425	2.97
V	566,581	17.68	2,451,454	76.50	99,649	3.11	86,983	2.71	3,204,667	5.95
VI	1,516,464	37.44	1,940,183	47.90	362,955	8.96	277,244	5.83	4,050,440	7.53
VII	2,337,847	54.81	928,445	21.77	758,873	17.79	193,682	5.45	4,265,253	7.93
VIII	1,566,197	62.71	584,419	23.40	228,410	9.15	118,392	4.74	2,497,418	4.64
IX	1,032,725	59.58	265,862	15.34	350,159	20.20	84,652	4.88	1,733,398	3.22
X	1,736,164	70.41	277,447	11.25	331,574	13.45	120,434	4.88	2,465,619	4.58
XI	2,090,787	83.46	136,106	5.43	203,187	8.11	74,984	2.99	2,505,064	4.65
XII	1,270,261	62.84	258,810	12.80	401,322	19.85	90,940	4.50	2,021,333	3.76
XIII	977,843	65.52	294,131	19.71	169,895	11.38	50,465	3.38	1,492,334	2.77
BARMM	1,105,812	56.84	521,333	26.80	39,062	2.01	279,123	14.35	1,945,330	3.61
Absentee	543,251	74.17	143,281	19.56	6,282	0.86	39,578	5.40	732,392	1.36
Total	31,629,783	58.77	15,035,773	27.94	3,663,113	6.81	3,486,815	6.48	53,815,484	100

- Note: Basilan is divided by two regions: its capital city Isabela is a part of the Zamboanga Peninsula (Region IX), while the rest of its municipalities are in Bangsamoro (BARMM). Its entire totals are included in Bangsamoro.

==== Swing in vote share ====
Swing in percentage of the vote won by each candidate per province and Metro Manila city

from 2016 vice presidential election to the 2022 presidential election

Presidential candidates
Marcos
Robredo

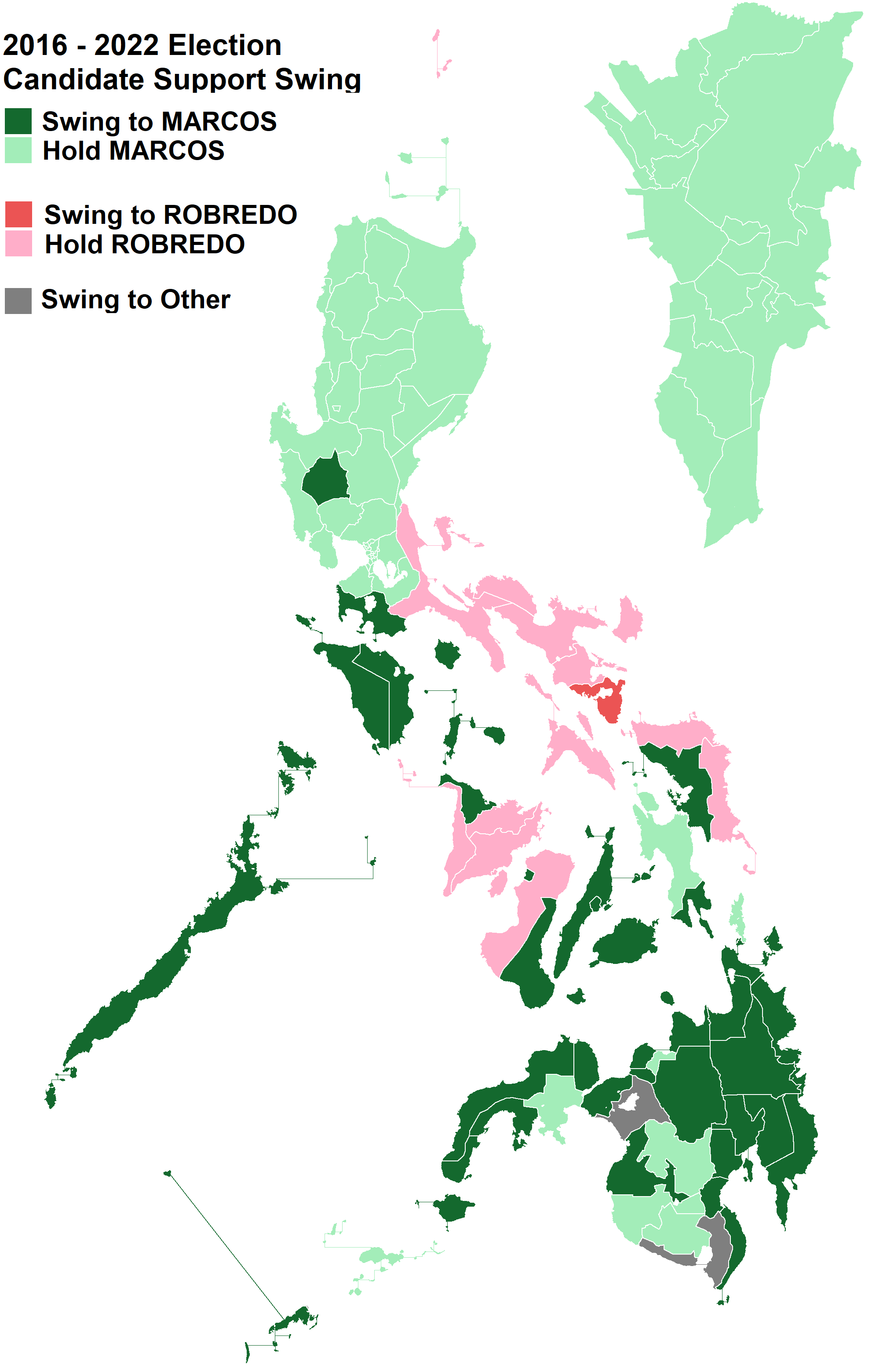
Marcos and Robredo province swing from 2016 and 2022.

== Vice presidential election ==
=== Candidates ===
==== Lito Atienza (PROMDI) ====
Buhay Party-List representative Lito Atienza was chosen by Pacquiao as his vice presidential running mate.

==== Walden Bello (PLM) ====
The Laban ng Masa (transl. Struggle of the Masses) coalition launched a campaign to collect 300,000 signatures to urge activist and former party-list lawmaker Walden Bello to run for president in the 2022 elections. In a statement, Laban ng Masa said it wanted to "push for an ambitious platform that focuses on the poor, prioritizes the neglected, and fights for the rights of ordinary Filipinos." Bello's group sought talks with Vice President Robredo's backers for three months but were ignored. This caused them to support Leody de Guzman's presidential candidacy, instead.

Later in October 20, Bello decided to run for the vice presidency, substituting Raquel Castillo who was supposed to be de Guzman's running mate.

==== Rizalito David (DPP) ====
David filed his candidacy on October 8. David was most notable for losing a quo warranto petition against Grace Poe in the 2016 election.

==== Sara Duterte (Lakas) ====
On July 9, 2021, Davao City mayor Sara Duterte said that she was open to running for president. However, there was no final decision yet. On September 9, 2021, she said that she was not running for president since her father, President Duterte was running for vice president, and they had agreed that only one of them would run for a national position. On November 11, she resigned from Hugpong ng Pagbabago and joined Lakas–CMD the same day. She filed her candidacy on November 13, 2021, substituting for Lyle Fernando Uy. Partido Federal ng Pilipinas adopted Duterte as their vice presidential candidate and Bongbong Marcos's running mate. Lakas and Duterte then announced that they were supporting Marcos's presidential bid; PDP–Laban first turned down her appeal for support. Later, on March 22, PDP-Laban endorsed Marcos Jr., but President Duterte chose to remain neutral.

==== Manny Lopez (WPP) ====
Manny SD Lopez said that if elected vice president, he'd prefer to head the Department of Foreign Affairs or the Department of Trade and Industry.

==== Willie Ong (Aksyon) ====
Ong was the running mate of Moreno; their ticket was officially announced on September 22, 2021.

==== Francis Pangilinan (Liberal) ====
In June 2021, Pangilinan announced that he was seeking reelection to the Senate. After Vice President Robredo announced her presidential candidacy, several sources from the Liberal Party indicated that the Senator would be her running mate for her presidential bid. Pangilinan filed his candidacy for vice president a day after Robredo. His campaign platform was focused on food security and agriculture.

==== Carlos Serapio (Katipunan) ====
Carlos Serapio, Magondato's running mate, said that he would push for federalism in the Philippines if he won.

==== Tito Sotto (NPC) ====
In July 2021, Tito Sotto announced that he would be Lacson's eventual running mate in the presidential race; this was followed by an official campaign announcement on September 8, 2021.

=== Debates and forums ===
P Participated A Absent NI Not invited

Date	Organizers	Media partners	Location	Moderators	Candidates									Source
Date	Organizers	Media partners	Location	Moderators	Atienza PROMDI	Bello PLM	David DPP	Duterte Lakas	Lopez WPP	Ong Aksyon	Pangilinan LP	Serapio Katipunan	Sotto NPC	Source
PiliPinas Debates 2022
Mar 20	COMELEC	Syndication	Sofitel Philippine Plaza Manila, Pasay	Ruth Cabal	A	P	P	A	P	P	P	P	P	
Apr 30	COMELEC	N/A	Sofitel Philippine Plaza Manila, Pasay	N/A	Cancelled									
PiliPinas Forum 2022
May 3 – 6	COMELEC and KBP	KBP member networks	Various	Various	A	P	P	A	P	A	A	P	P	
Other debates
Feb 22	SMNI	SMNI and The Manila Times	Okada Manila, Parañaque	Karen Jimeno	Cancelled									
Feb 26	CNN Philippines	CNN Philippines and BusinessMirror	University of Santo Tomas, Manila	Ruth Cabal and Rico Hizon	A	P	P	A	P	P	P	P	P	

=== Opinion polls ===
Opinion polling, commonly known as "surveys" in the Philippines, is conducted by Social Weather Stations (SWS), Pulse Asia, OCTA Research, and other third-party pollsters.

The tables below the latest six polls that were administered.

Fieldwork date(s)	Pollster	Sample size	MoE	Atienza PROMDI	Bello PLM	David DPP	Duterte Lakas	Lopez WPP	Ong Aksyon	Pangilinan LP	Serapio Katipunan	Sotto NPC	Others	Und./ None	Ref.
May 9	Election results	56,097,722	N/A	0.52	0.19	0.11	61.53	0.31	3.59	17.82	0.17	15.76	N/A		
Exit poll	Publicus Asia	29,024		—	—	—	67	—	4	16	—	11	2	—	—
May 2–5	Publicus Asia	1,500	±3.0%	1	1	—	59	—	9	16	—	9	0	4 / 1	—
Apr 22–30	Mobilis–TruthWatch	2,400	±2%	1	—	—	55	—	4	13	—	24	3	—	—
Apr 22–25	OCTA	2,400	±2.0%	1	0.03	—	56	0.1	4	16	0.001	22	—	0.5 / 0.7	0.1
Apr 19–21	Publicus Asia	1,500	±3.0%	1	1	—	59	—	8	15	—	9	—	6 / 1	—
Apr 16–21	Pulse Asia	2,400	±2.0%	0.5	0.4	0.1	55	1	3	16	0.3	18	—	— / 1	5

=== Results ===
Just like her running mate, Duterte won with the largest majority of the Fifth Republic, and the largest majority since 1969. Duterte's vote count exceeded that of Marcos, and she got the most votes by a Filipino for any office in history. Her 43.71% winning margin is the largest in history since Sergio Osmeña's landslide victories in 1935 and 1941.

Duterte won throughout the country except in Guimaras, Iloilo and Iloilo City, and in the Bicol provinces of Albay, Camarines Norte, Camarines Sur and Catanduanes, where Robredo's running mate Francis Pangilinan won, and in Sorsogon where Tito Sotto won. Duterte won in all areas in Mindanao canvassed by Congress. Among absentee voters, Duterte won amongst the local and overseas voters, while Pangilinan nosed her out among detainee voters.

Candidate	Party	Votes	%
Sara Duterte (Note: Running mate of Bongbong Marcos (Partido Federal ng Pilipinas))	Lakas–CMD	32,208,417	61.53
Kiko Pangilinan (Note: Running mate of Leni Robredo (Independent))	Liberal Party	9,329,207	17.82
Tito Sotto (Note: Running mate of Panfilo Lacson (Independent))	Nationalist People's Coalition	8,251,267	15.76
Willie Ong	Aksyon Demokratiko	1,878,531	3.59
Lito Atienza	PROMDI	270,381	0.52
Manny SD Lopez	Labor Party Philippines	159,670	0.31
Walden Bello	Partido Lakas ng Masa	100,827	0.19
Carlos Serapio	Katipunan ng Kamalayang Kayumanggi	90,989	0.17
Rizalito David	Democratic Party of the Philippines	56,711	0.11
Total		52,346,000	100.00
Valid votes		52,346,000	93.43
Invalid/blank votes		3,682,855	6.57
Total votes		56,028,855	100.00
Registered voters/turnout		67,523,697	82.98
Source: Congress (vote totals); COMELEC (election day turnout, absentee turnout)

Popular vote percentage
Sara Duterte	61.53%
Francis Pangilinan	17.82%
Tito Sotto	15.76%
Willie Ong	3.59%
Others	1.30%

==== Result by island group and region ====
Result per island group
Island group	Duterte		Pangilinan		Sotto		Others		Total	%
Island group	Votes	%	Votes	%	Votes	%	Votes	%	Total	%
Luzon	15,670,038	53.04	6,213,978	21.03	5,941,446	20.11	1,720,955	5.82	29,546,417	56.44
Visayas	5,906,250	57.33	2,291,398	22.24	1,623,693	15.76	480,006	4.66	10,301,347	19.68
Mindanao	10,071,619	85.59	710,214	6.04	664,492	5.65	321,539	2.73	11,767,864	22.48
Absentee	560,510	76.74	113,617	15.56	21,636	2.96	34,609	4.74	730,372	1.40
Total	32,208,417	61.53	9,329,207	17.82	8,251,267	15.76	2,557,109	4.89	52,346,000	100

Result per region
Region	Duterte		Pangilinan		Sotto		Others		Total	%
Region	Votes	%	Votes	%	Votes	%	Votes	%	Total	%
I	2,146,327	72.33	212,472	7.16	503,075	16.95	105,363	3.55	2,967,237	5.67
CAR	683,414	77.77	69,066	7.86	96,754	11.01	29,512	3.36	878,746	1.68
II	1,400,203	77.07	138,403	7.62	222,702	12.26	55,448	3.05	1,816,756	3.47
III	3,264,777	53.78	930,863	15.33	1,576,940	25.98	297,720	4.90	6,070,300	11.60
NCR	3,206,709	54.72	1,212,379	20.69	926,197	15.81	514,492	8.78	5,859,777	11.19
IV-A	3,614,018	49.06	1,582,160	21.48	1,694,615	23.00	476,036	6.46	7,366,829	14.07
IV-B	684,689	44.59	366,365	23.86	389,168	25.34	95,387	6.21	1,535,609	2.93
V	669,901	21.96	1,702,270	55.79	531,995	17.44	146,997	4.82	3,051,163	5.83
VI	1,508,367	38.89	1,398,752	36.06	760,188	19.60	211,299	5.45	3,878,606	7.41
VII	2,790,568	68.59	561,276	13.80	539,555	13.26	177,277	4.36	4,068,676	7.77
VIII	1,607,315	68.28	331,370	14.08	323,950	13.76	91,430	3.88	2,354,065	4.50
IX	1,242,316	76.40	161,270	9.92	164,079	10.09	58,424	3.59	1,626,089	3.11
X	2,010,943	84.77	160,872	6.78	132,854	5.60	67,548	2.85	2,372,217	4.53
XI	2,279,473	92.32	54,182	2.19	92,555	3.75	42,809	1.73	2,469,019	4.72
XII	1,611,516	82.00	132,985	6.77	154,445	7.86	66,393	3.38	1,965,339	3.75
XIII	1,258,406	86.93	88,478	6.11	65,994	4.56	34,707	2.40	1,447,585	2.77
BARMM	1,668,965	88.42	112,427	5.96	54,565	2.89	51,658	2.74	1,887,615	3.61
Absentee	560,510	76.74	113,617	15.56	21,636	2.96	34,609	4.74	730,372	1.40
Total	32,208,417	61.53	9,329,207	17.82	8,251,267	15.76	2,557,109	4.89	52,346,000	100

- Note: Basilan is divided by two regions: its capital city Isabela is a part of the Zamboanga Peninsula (Region IX), while the rest of its municipalities are in Bangsamoro (BARMM). Its entire totals are included in Bangsamoro.

==== Results per province, city, diplomatic post and absentee voting category ====
Each province and city that is independent of a province and is a congressional district by itself sent its certificates of canvass to Congress. Each diplomatic post, local absentee voters and detainee voters also sent their respective certificates of canvass. The Special Geographic Area of Bangsamoro, and jointly Taguig and Pateros sent their respective certificates of canvass. From there, the results were tallied in a joint session of Congress.

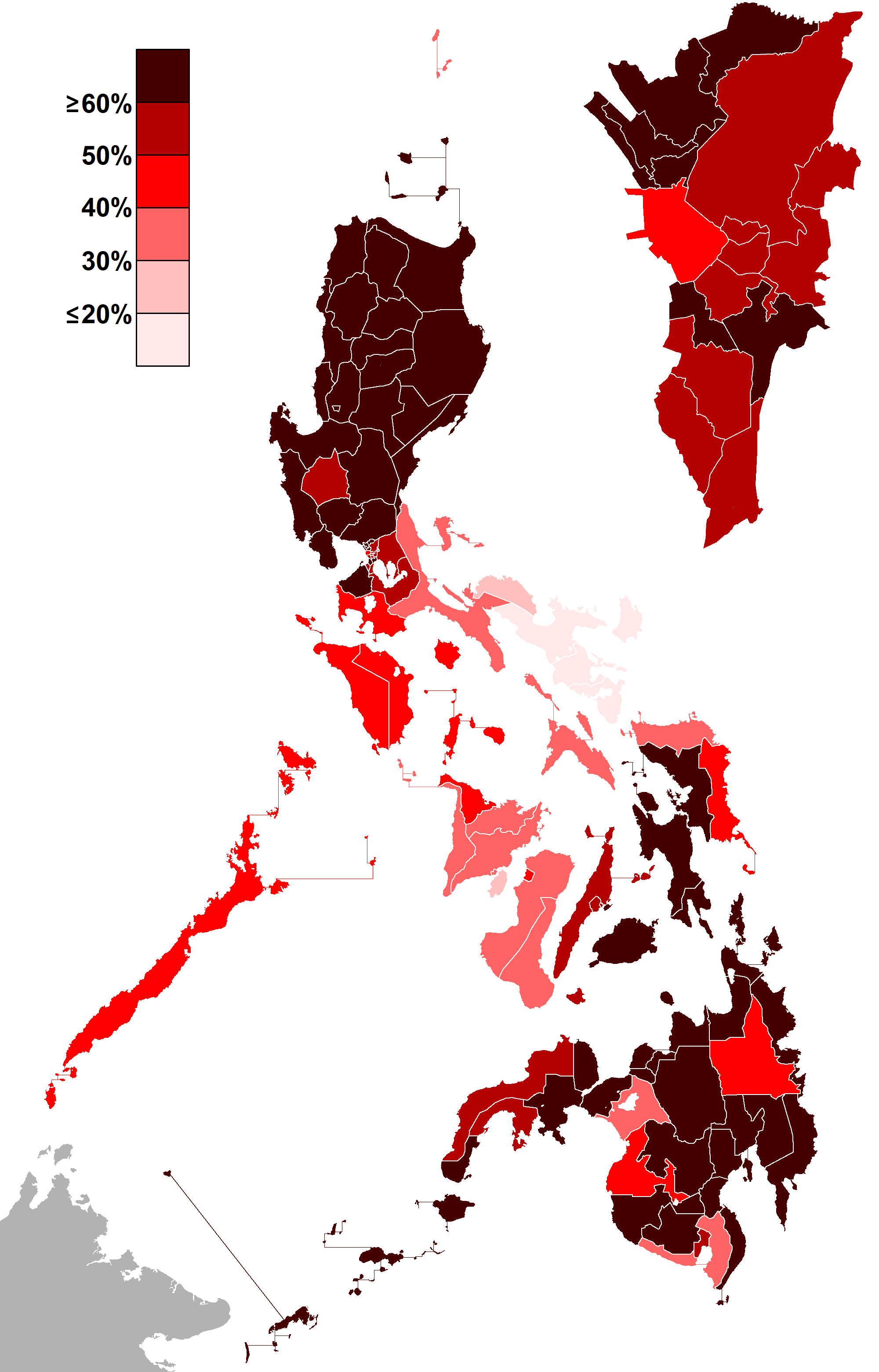
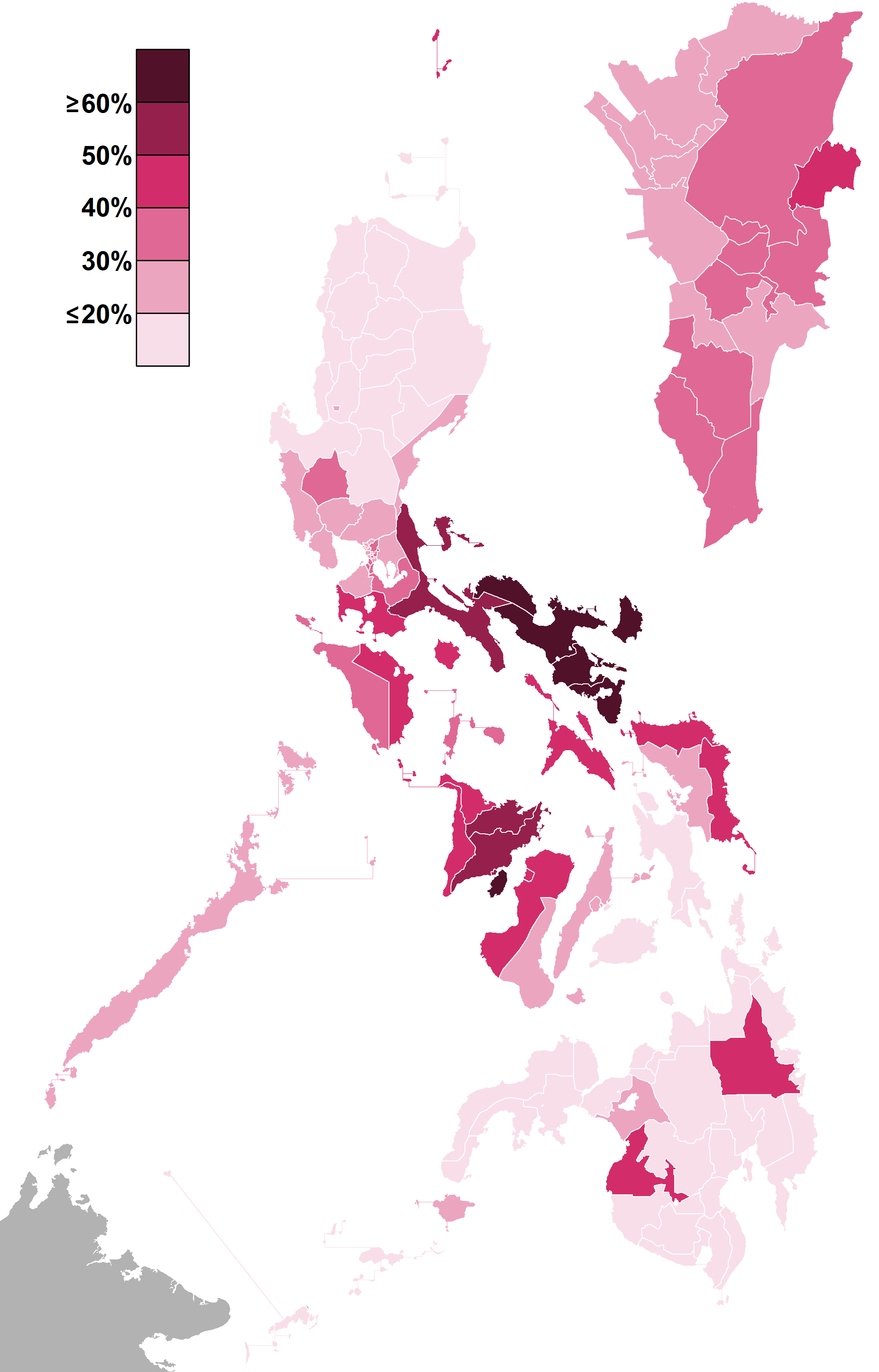
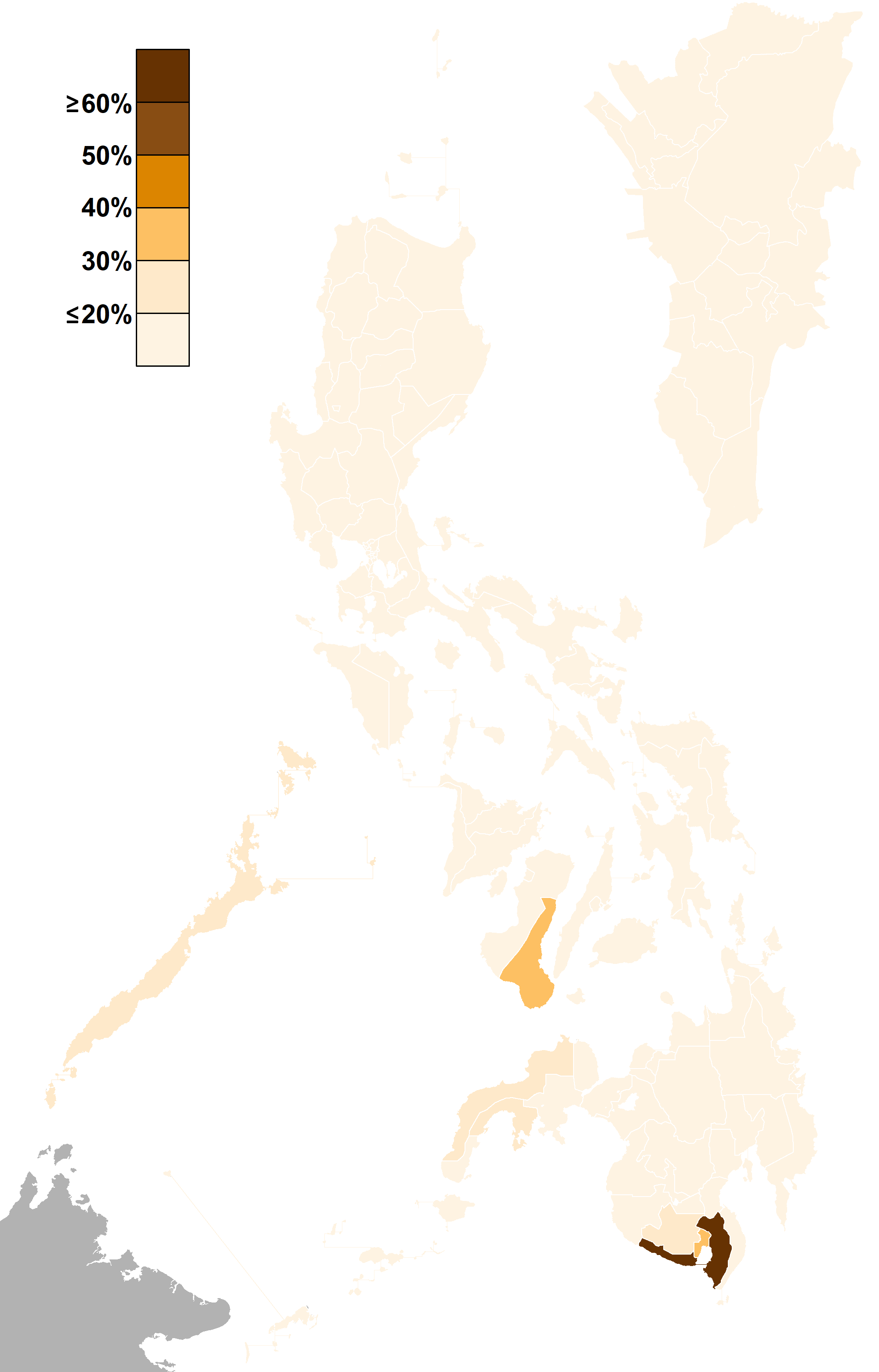
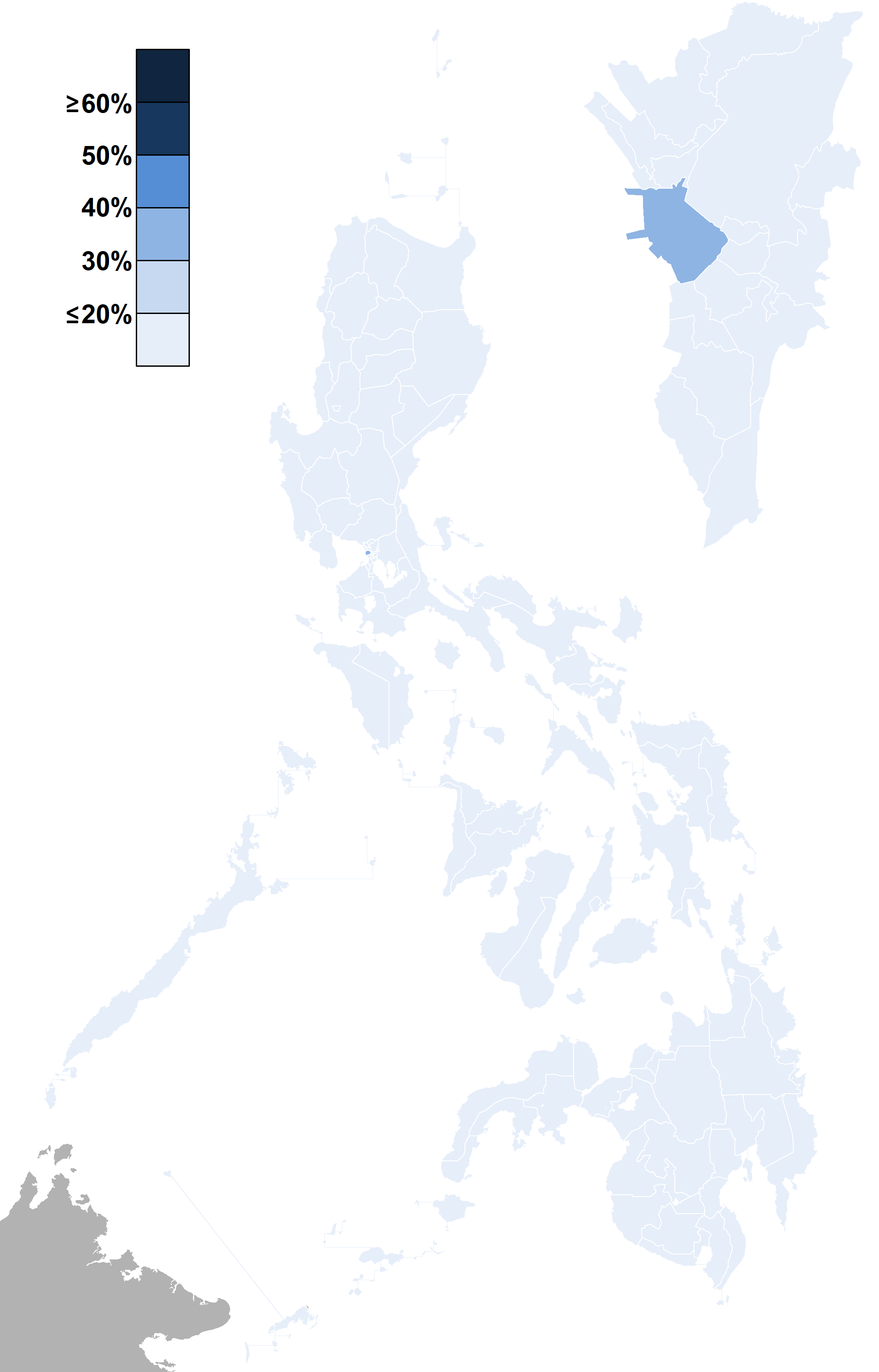
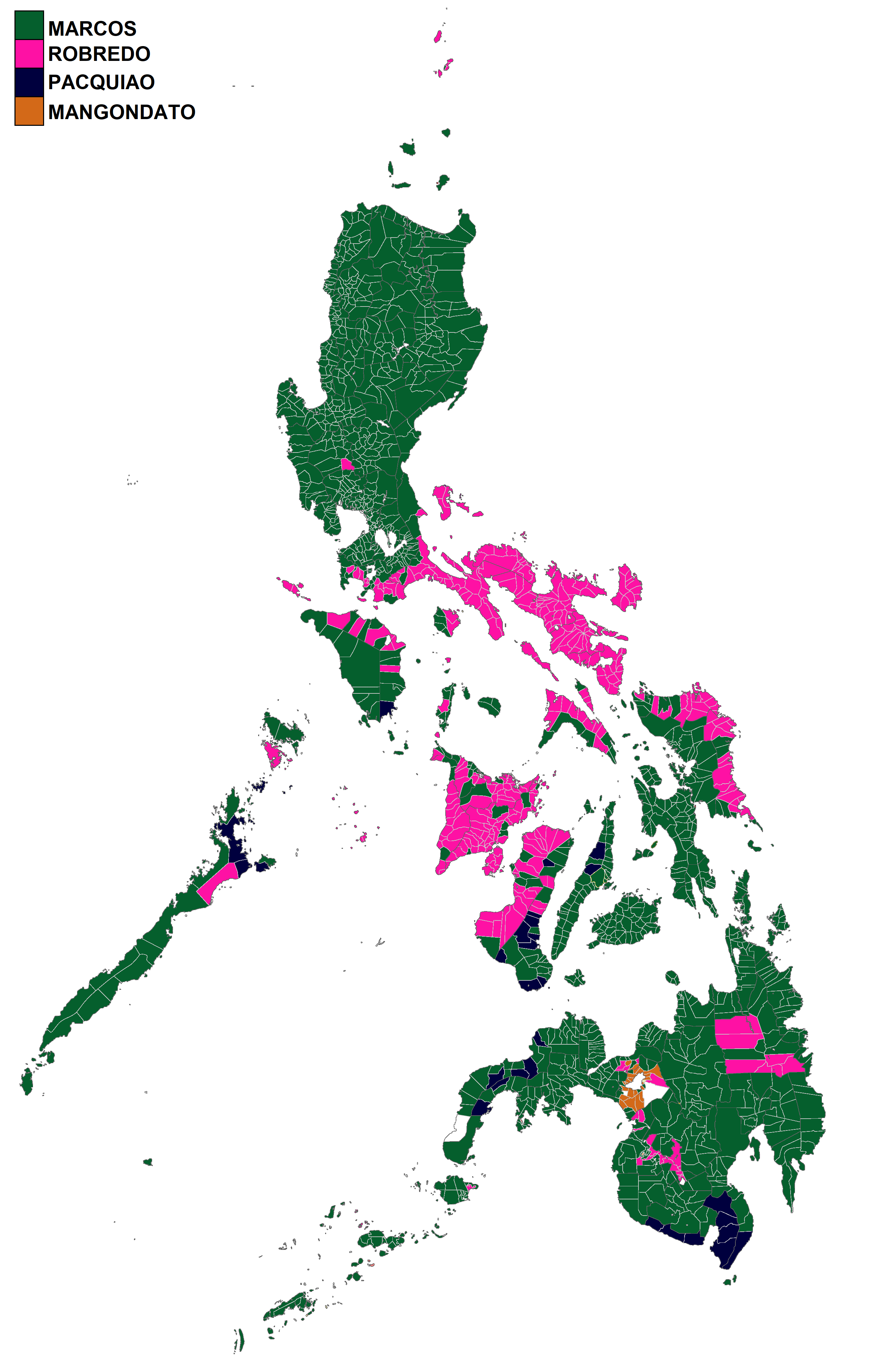
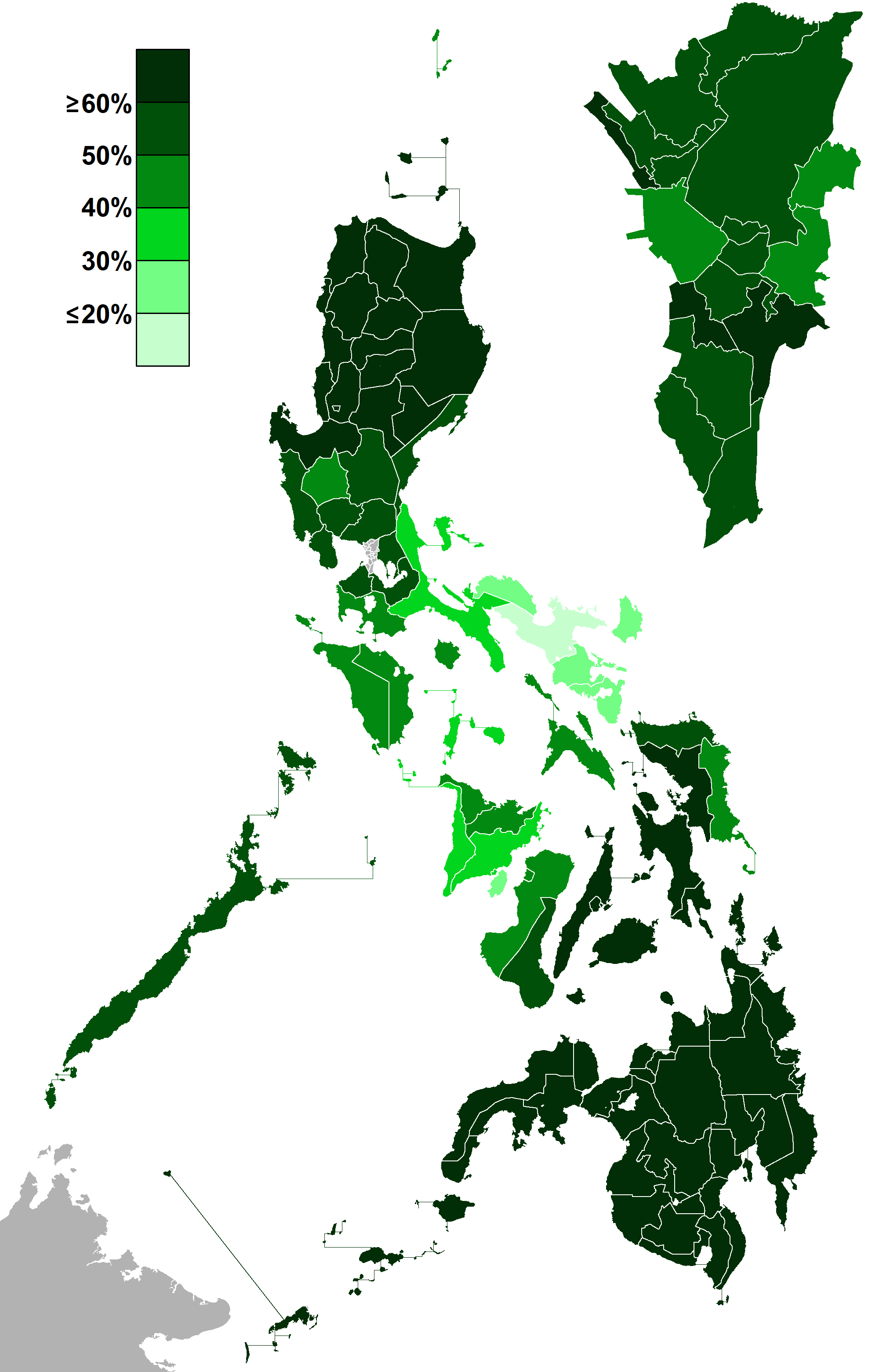
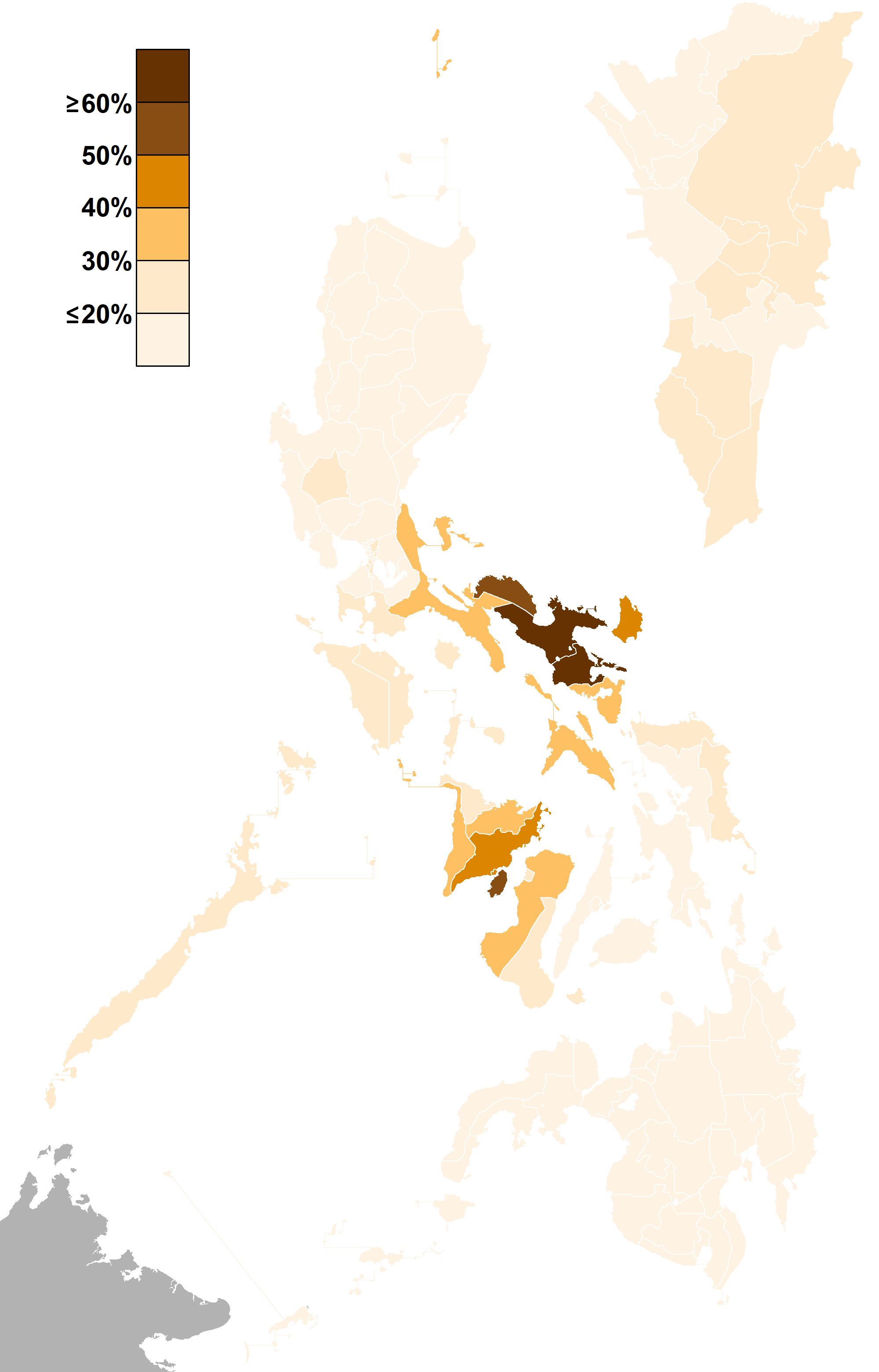
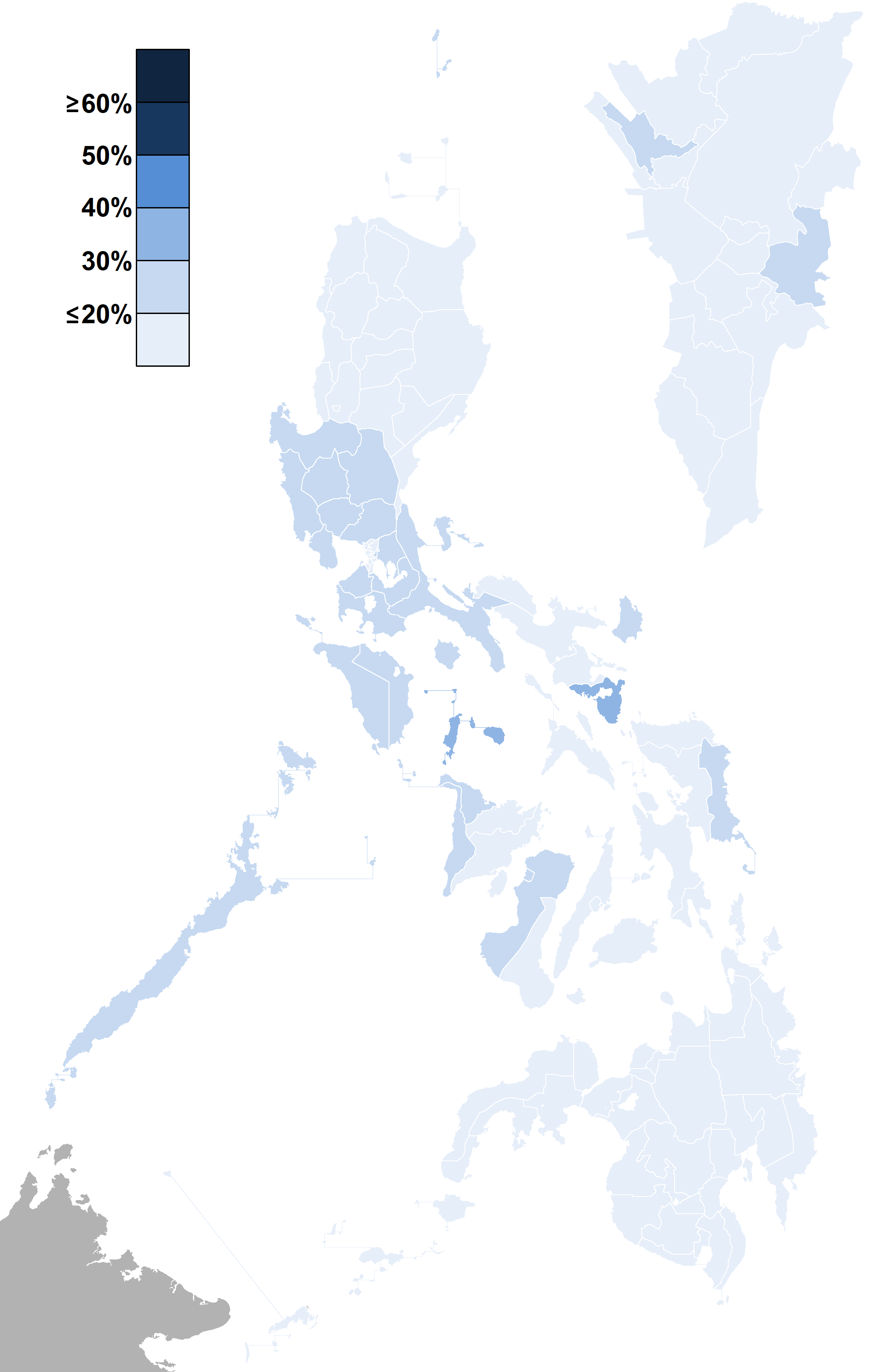
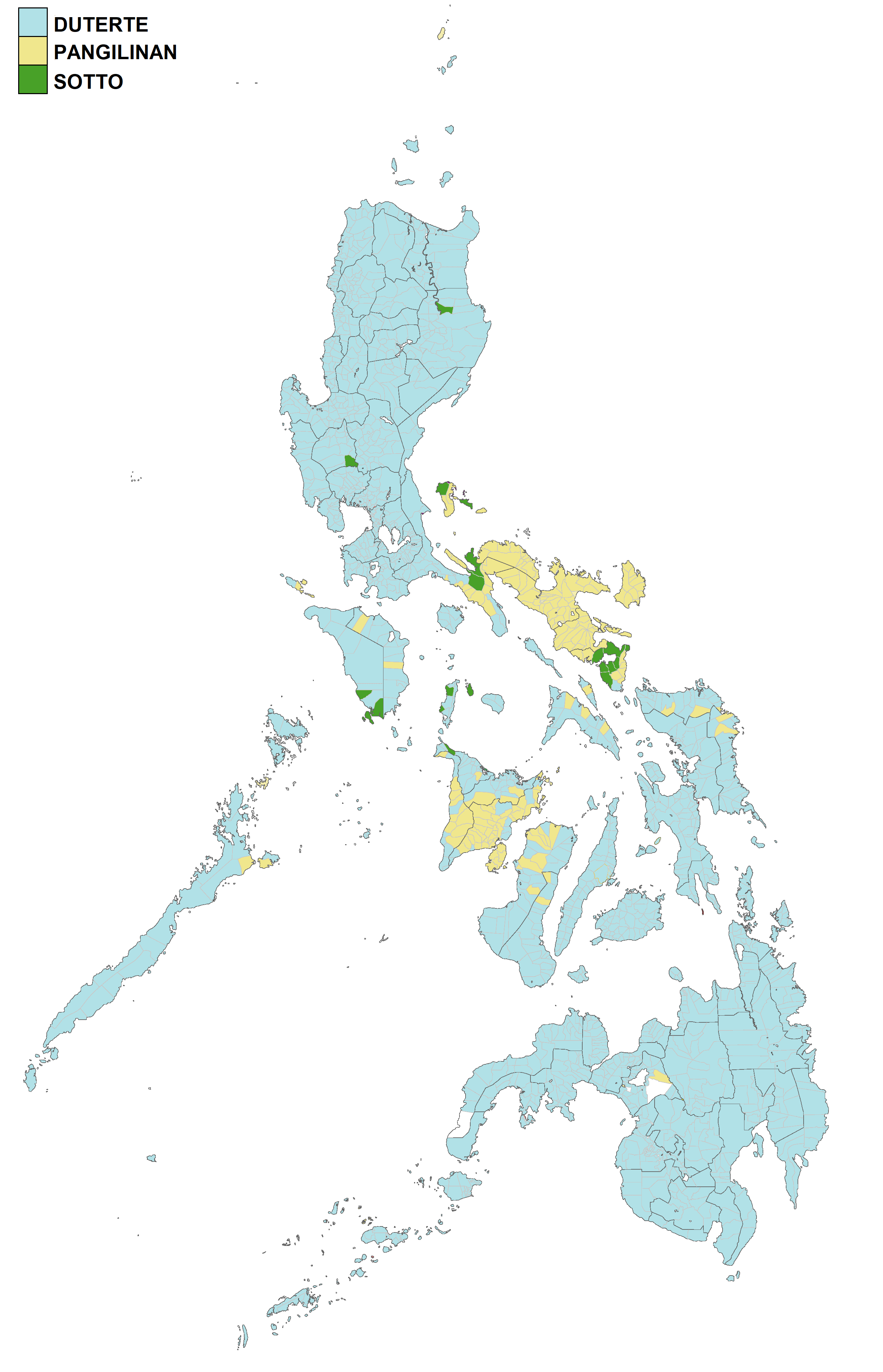
Percentage of the vote won by each candidate per province and city.				Municipal level breakdown
Presidential Candidates
Marcos	Robredo	Pacquiao	Moreno	Municipal breakdown
Vice Presidential Candidates
Duterte	Pangilinan	Sotto		Municipal breakdown

==== Close places ====
Margin of victory is less than 5% for the presidential election:

- Aklan: 0.01% (Marcos wins by 39 votes)
- Marinduque: 0.67% (Marcos win)
- Detainee voters: 0.98% (Marcos wins by one vote)
- Indonesia: 0.98% (Marcos win)
- Agusan del Sur: 2.37% (Marcos win)
- Oriental Mindoro: 3.09% (Marcos win)
- Bacolod: 3.26% (Marcos win)
- Australia: 3.43% (Robredo win)
- Romblon: 3.59% (Marcos win)
- Negros Occidental: 3.60% (Robredo win)
- United States: 3.86% (Marcos win)
- Batangas: 4.11% (Marcos win)
- Negros Oriental: 4.87% (Marcos win)

Margin of victory is less than 5% for the vice presidential election:

- Detainee voters: 1.04% (Pangilinan wins by one vote)
- Antique: 2.67% (Duterte win)
- Vatican City: 3.14% (Pangilinan win)
- Sorsogon: 3.32% (Sotto win)
- Quezon: 3.71% (Duterte win)

==== Landslides ====
Margin of victory is more than 50% for the presidential election:

- Ilocos Norte: 93.14% (Marcos wins in his home province)
- Sulu: 92.99% (Marcos win)
- Abra: 92.39% (Marcos win)
- Ilocos Sur: 91.00% (Marcos win)
- Apayao: 90.79% (Marcos win)
- La Union: 86.97% (Marcos win)
- Local absentee voters: 86.58% (Marcos win)
- Davao City: 86.09% (Marcos win)
- Kalinga: 83.81% (Marcos win)
- Taiwan: 83.39% (Marcos win)
- Cagayan 81.44% (Marcos win)
- Russia: 80.20% (Marcos win)
- Camarines Sur: 79.06% (Robredo wins in her home province)
- Lebanon: 77.88% (Marcos win)
- Davao del Norte: 77.43% (Marcos win)
- Camiguin: 77.24% (Marcos win)
- Isabela: 77.19% (Marcos win)
- Kuwait: 76.19% (Marcos win)
- Tawi-Tawi: 74.33% (Marcos win)
- Quirino: 74.29% (Marcos win)
- Jordan: 74.10% (Marcos win)
- Davao de Oro: 71.70% (Marcos win)
- Mountain Province: 71.66% (Marcos win)
- Nueva Vizcaya: 71.32% (Marcos win)
- Morocco: 71.03% (Marcos win)
- Davao del Sur: 70.98% (Marcos win)
- Benguet: 70.40% (Marcos win)
- Brunei: 70.15% (Marcos win)
- Hong Kong: 69.49% (Marcos win)
- Israel: 69.43% (Marcos win)
- Chile: 68.12% (Marcos win)
- Bahrain: 67.64% (Marcos win)
- Turkey: 67.60% (Marcos win)
- Special geographic area of Bangsamoro: 66.43% (Robredo win)
- Albay: 66.29% (Robredo win)
- Cagayan de Oro: 65.85% (Marcos win)
- Leyte: 65.13% (Marcos win)
- Oman: 65.51% (Marcos win)
- Pakistan: 64.73% (Marcos win)
- Saudi Arabia: 64.32% (Marcos win)
- United Arab Emirates: 63.51% (Marcos win)
- Agusan del Norte: 63.12% (Marcos win)
- Brazil: 63.10% (Marcos win)
- Pangasinan: 62.14% (Marcos win)
- Timor-Leste: 61.92% (Marcos win)
- Malaysia: 61.31% (Marcos win)
- Ifugao: 60.79% (Marcos win)
- Angola: 60.78% (Marcos win)
- Misamis Occidental: 60.68% (Marcos win)
- South Korea: 60.61% (Marcos win)
- Cotabato: 60.11% (Marcos win)
- Japan: 59.90% (Marcos win)
- Iligan: 59.20% (Marcos win)
- Qatar: 58.94% (Marcos win)
- Davao Occidental: 58.91% (Marcos win)
- Greece: 58.28% (Marcos win)
- Dinagat Islands: 58.17% (Marcos win)
- Spain: 57.94% (Marcos win)
- Surigao del Norte: 57.24% (Marcos win)
- Misamis Oriental: 56.91% (Marcos win)
- Nigeria: 56.83% (Marcos win)
- Nueva Ecija: 56.33% (Marcos win)
- Catanduanes: 55.76% (Robredo win)
- Laos: 54.10% (Marcos win)
- Sorsogon: 53.99% (Robredo win)
- Camarines Norte: 53.46% (Robredo win)
- Southern Leyte: 52.13% (Marcos win)
- Kenya: 52.07% (Marcos win)
- Davao Occidental: 51.94% (Marcos win)
- Surigao del Sur: 51.88% (Marcos win)
- Lapu-Lapu City: 51.70% (Marcos win)
- Zamboanga City: 51.25% (Marcos win)
- Baguio: 51.01% (Marcos win)
- Sultan Kudarat: 50.75% (Marcos win)
- Bukidnon: 50.54% (Marcos win)
- Thailand: 50.28% (Marcos win)

Margin of victory is more than 50% for the vice presidential election:

- Sulu: 96.97% (Duterte win)
- Davao City: 93.88% (Duterte wins in her home city)
- Special geographic area of Bangsamoro: 92.12% (Duterte win)
- Local absentee voters: 91.08% (Duterte win)
- Ilocos Norte: 90.98% (Duterte win)
- Camiguin: 90.79% (Duterte win)
- Maguindanao: 89.87% (Duterte win)
- Davao de Oro: 88.07% (Duterte win)
- Davao del Sur: 87.28% (Duterte win)
- Davao Occidental: 87.02% (Duterte win)
- Taiwan: 86.79% (Duterte win)
- Ilocos Sur: 86.45% (Duterte win)
- Abra: 86.30% (Duterte win)
- Davao Oriental: 86.22% (Duterte win)
- Cotabato: 85.27% (Duterte win)
- Davao del Norte: 84.51% (Duterte win)
- Agusan del Sur: 85.08% (Duterte win)
- Tawi-Tawi: 84.29% (Duterte win)
- Misamis Occidental: 83.79% (Duterte win)
- Russia: 83.36% (Duterte win)
- Kuwait: 81.88% (Duterte win)
- Jordan: 81.81% (Duterte win)
- Agusan del Norte: 81.23% (Duterte win)
- Lebanon: 80.86% (Duterte win)
- Surigao del Norte: 80.24% (Duterte win)
- Cagayan de Oro: 79.53% (Duterte win)
- Morocco: 79.48% (Duterte win)
- Apayao: 78.60% (Duterte win)
- Kalinga: 78.53% (Duterte win)
- Sultan Kudarat: 78.02% (Duterte win)
- Surigao del Sur: 77.83% (Duterte win)
- Misamis Oriental: 77.61% (Duterte win)
- Iligan: 77.06% (Duterte win)
- Bukidnon: 76.59% (Duterte win)
- Brunei: 75.69% (Duterte win)
- Basilan: 75.30% (Duterte win)
- Egypt: 74.90% (Duterte win)
- Bahrain: 74.20% (Duterte win)
- Chile: 74.20% (Duterte win)
- Dinagat Islands: 73.90% (Duterte win)
- Southern Leyte: 73.78% (Duterte win)
- La Union: 73.54% (Duterte win)
- Hong Kong: 73.31% (Duterte win)
- Oman: 73.26% (Duterte win)
- Israel: 72.97% (Duterte win)
- Turkey: 72.73% (Duterte win)
- Saudi Arabia: 72.64% (Duterte win)
- Lanao del Norte: 72.03% (Duterte win)
- Timor-Leste: 71.59% (Duterte win)
- Lapu-Lapu City: 71.29% (Duterte win)
- Brazil: 71.19% (Duterte win)
- United Arab Emirates: 70.50% (Duterte win)
- Zamboanga del Sur: 69.74% (Duterte win)
- Bohol: 68.88% (Duterte win)
- Pakistan: 68.75% (Duterte win)
- Cagayan: 68.72% (Duterte win)
- Malaysia: 67.63% (Duterte win)
- Qatar: 67.52% (Duterte win)
- Angola: 67.40% (Duterte win)
- Leyte: 67.00% (Duterte win)
- South Cotabato: 66.51% (Duterte win)
- Sarangani: 66.24% (Duterte win)
- Mountain Province: 66.13% (Duterte win)
- South Korea: 65.97% (Duterte win)
- Zamboanga City: 65.53% (Duterte win)
- Isabela 64.47% (Duterte win)
- Czech Republic: 64.31% (Duterte win)
- Japan: 63.90% (Duterte win)
- Nigeria: 63.22% (Duterte win)
- Spain: 62.90% (Duterte win)
- Lanao del Sur: 62.60% (Duterte win)
- Nueva Vizcaya: 62.25% (Duterte win)
- General Santos: 62.21% (Duterte win)
- Zamboanga del Norte: 61.95% (Duterte win)
- Zamboanga Sibugay: 61.39% (Duterte win)
- Greece: 61.09% (Duterte win)
- Kenya: 60.14% (Duterte win)
- Biliran: 58.77% (Duterte win)
- Iran: 57.43% (Duterte win)
- Thailand: 57.01% (Duterte win)
- Laos: 56.59% (Duterte win)
- Benguet: 56.39% (Duterte win)
- Camarines Sur: 56.16% (Pangilinan win)
- Cebu: 55.72% (Duterte win)
- Cambodia: 55.66% (Duterte win)
- Singapore: 55.38% (Duterte win)
- Ifugao: 55.32% (Duterte win)
- Quirino: 55.09% (Duterte win)
- New Zealand: 53.48% (Duterte win)
- Baguio: 51.00% (Duterte win)
- South Africa: 50.54% (Duterte win)

== Aftermath ==
=== Election night ===
Despite calls to extend voting hours due to technical difficulties with the vote-counting machines (VCMs), the COMELEC closed voting at 7:00 pm, although they allowed those within 30 meters of the polling precinct by that time to cast their votes.

Transmission of election returns began shortly after closing. Within four hours, about 80,000 returns were transmitted to the commission, an improvement from 2016 and 2019 where it took ten and eleven hours respectively. The COMELEC attributed the speed to improvements in the facilities, the training of workers and technicians, and the services by telecommunication companies.

At around 11 pm, three hours after initial results of the elections were released, Marcos made a short speech thanking his supporters for voting for him. Despite leading in the preliminary results, he acknowledged that the counting was not yet over. He also urged his supporters to be vigilant and watch their votes. Shortly after 3:00 am, Robredo issued a statement to thank her supporters, and called their campaign "historic" for being led by volunteers. She reiterated that she would not back down, noting that not all votes have been counted yet and that other issues had yet to be resolved, but called on her supporters to listen to the voice of the electorate.

=== Concessions ===
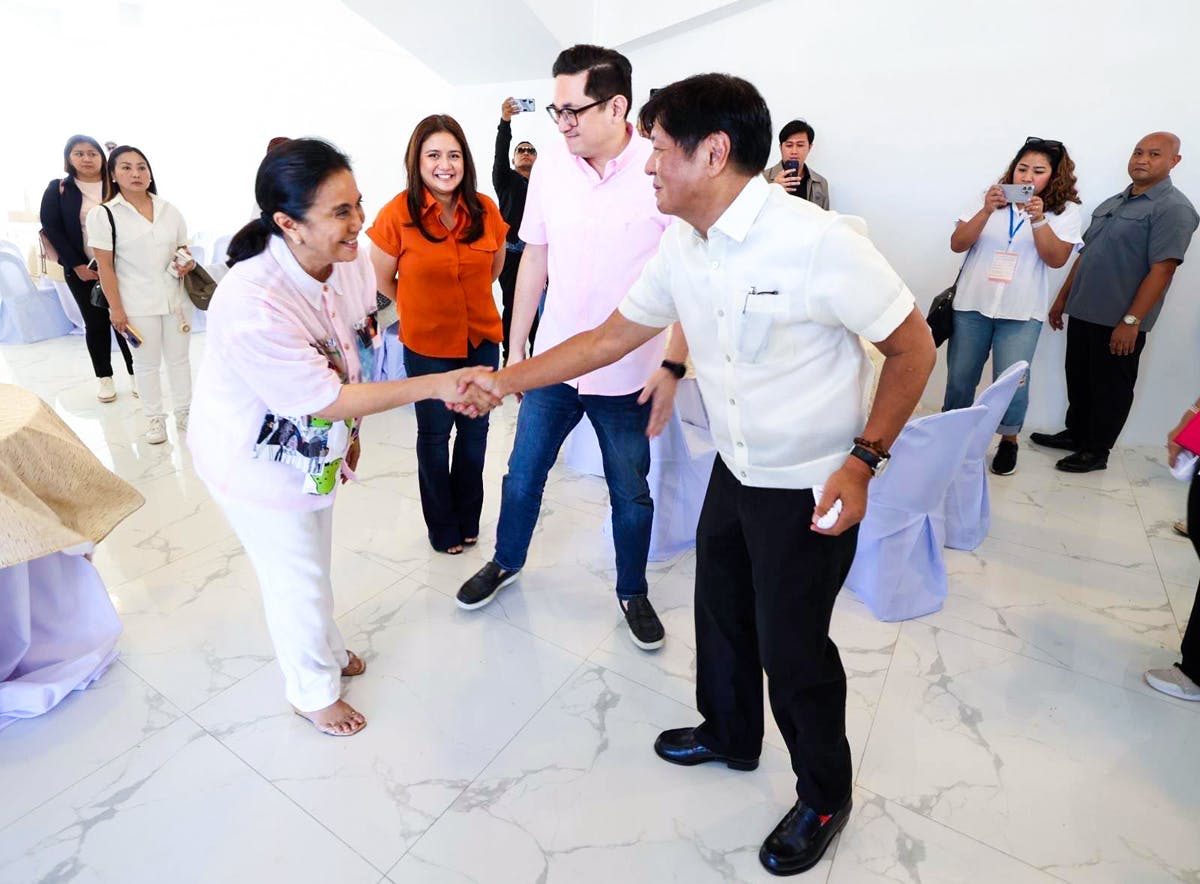
In October 2024, Leni Robredo and Bongbong Marcos met for the first time since the election and the latter's inauguration.

Isko Moreno conceded to Marcos the day after the elections. He urged his supporters to support Marcos. Pacquiao conceded to Marcos and bid him well wishes. Willie Ong also conceded to Duterte, wishing both her and Marcos success. Faisal Mangondato and Carlos Serapio also conceded, via a statement released by their political party, saying that Marcos and Duterte "obtained the People’s Mandate." Manny SD Lopez conceded to Duterte, saying "Whatever the Filipino electorates considered in their choice of candidates, we have to respect, for this is the essence of democracy." Independent candidate Ernesto Abella also conceded several days after the election, saying he respected the results and acknowledging Marcos as the next president.

Lacson, while he did not concede, said that he was retiring to his home in Cavite. His running mate, Tito Sotto, conceded the vice presidency in a separate statement, and wished the incoming administration, without naming names, "good luck." In a thanksgiving event at the Ateneo de Manila University, Robredo and Pangilinan urged their supporters to accept the results of the election, while not explicitly conceding.

Leody de Guzman, while citing irregularities on election day, conceded; his running mate, Walden Bello, slammed Marcos, saying the country may face "six years of instability" and that a large part of the country will "refuse to grant legitimacy and credibility to the rule of a family of thieves".

=== Protests ===
On May 10, several groups protested in front of the COMELEC main office at the Palacio del Gobernador in Intramuros. They alleged massive electoral fraud, citing reports of 1,800 defective or malfunctioning VCMs, the voters being asked to leave their ballots at the precinct for mass feeding after some VCMs broke down, and the fast transmission of results. Protesters were reportedly chanting "Marcos, Magnanakaw" (lit. 'Marcos, Thief'), a chant popularized during the 1980s. Meanwhile, the Office of the Student Regent of the University of the Philippines called on their students to walk out, announcing that there will be "no classes under a Marcos presidency."

The electoral commission has denied and debunked claims of electoral fraud. Election watchdog Legal Network for Truthful Elections (LENTE) disputed claims that the speedy transmission of returns was suspicious, while the COMELEC stated that leaving ballots behind if VCMs malfunction is part of the protocol to avoid voter disenfranchisement. The Parish Pastoral Council for Responsible Voting (PPCRV) found no irregularities in the partial and unofficial count. Meanwhile, the PPCRV and other statisticians dismissed claims of a programmed consistent percentage gap between Marcos and Robredo, after a viral post in social media claimed the consistency was evidence of fraud. According to the post, at every incremental update in the counting, Robredo's count never deviated from 47 percent of the number of votes that Marcos had, a phenomenon they considered suspicious.

On May 16 and 17, 2022, respectively, two of the petitions against Marcos' candidacy that were later dismissed by Comelec were filed post-election at the Supreme Court. The consolidated petitions were dismissed by the Court on June 28.

In 2023, Eliseo Rio Jr., a former acting secretary of the Department of Information and Communications Technology, investigated along with a team of forensics experts, the transmission of election returns to the COMELEC after he had doubts about the high transmission rate, and alleged that a large portion of election returns from Metro Manila, Cavite and Batangas were transmitted through the IP address 192.168.0.2, an address commonly used within local area networks. He along with others petitioned the Supreme Court and later the Comelec to pave the way for an investigation of the phenomenon. Asked about the allegations in July 2023, COMELEC Chairman George Garcia stated that the IP address was accurate, as it was being used within local networks for 20,300 of their modems, and stated that "there was nothing illegal about it. It does not matter if the IP have the same address. What is important is that the transmitted election results are accurate." Election watchdogs, including the National Movement for Free Elections, were present during the testing and aware that only one IP address was used.

=== International reactions ===
Marcos was congratulated by diplomats from several countries after initial results showing his victory were released. Chinese ambassador to Manila Huang Xilian paid the president-elect a courtesy visit on May 12, saying China was looking forward “to bring[ing] the two countries' Relationship of Comprehensive Strategic Cooperation to new heights.”. United States Secretary of State Antony Blinken welcomed Marcos's election, stating that the United States was looking forward to working with him to "strengthen the enduring alliance between the United States and the Philippines." Meanwhile, other countries such as Japan expressed their willingness to work with the incoming administration.

U.S. president Joe Biden later called Marcos to congratulate him. Biden said he was looking forward to working with Marcos to strengthen Philippines–United States relations and expand cooperation on key issues. However, White House coordinator for the Indo-Pacific Kurt Campbell said there were “historical considerations” that could pose challenges.

On May 19, Marcos said that he had held “very substantial” talks with Chinese President Xi Jinping, who had expressed support for his independent foreign policy. He said that ties with China would expand and “shift to a higher gear”, promising to upgrade relations in “not only diplomatic, not only trade, but also in culture, even in education, even in knowledge, even in health, to address whatever minor disagreements that we have right now”.
