= Congressional canvass for the 2022 Philippine presidential election =

The following is the official canvassing of votes by the Congress of the Philippines for the 2022 Philippine presidential and vice presidential election. The canvassing started on May 24, 2022 and ended a day later, making it the fastest congressional canvassing process in Philippine electoral history.

The Congress was mandated to declare a winner 30 days after the elections (June 8) maximum.

Results for the president.

Results for the vice president.

== Process ==
After voters had finished voting, the counting machines will then count the votes received by each candidate in each position. For positions elected on a national basis (president, vice president, senators and party-list representatives), the counting machine will then print an election return for that precinct, and will transmit the results to the municipal/city board of canvassers, Congress, Commission on Elections, the citizen's arm authorized by the commission, political parties, and others.

The city or municipality will then tally the votes for all positions and will issue two documents at its conclusion: a statement of votes where the votes obtained by candidates in each precinct in a city/municipality is stated; and a certificate of canvass (COC), a document in electronic and printed form containing the total votes in figures obtained by each candidate in the city or municipality. The city or municipal COC will either be sent electronically to Congress (if the city is an Independent city with its own legislative district) or to the provincial board of canvassers in which the process is repeated; this time the provincial COC will be sent to Congress.

Congress, sitting as the National Board of Canvassers, will canvass the votes to determine who among the candidates are elected president and vice president.

In theory, all of the votes from the election returns when added must be equal to the votes canvassed by Congress coming from the city/provincial COCs.

The provincial/city board of canvassers will send an electronically transmitted COC to the Congress' Consolidation and Canvassing System (CCS) server, which was activated minutes after voting closed on May 9. Meanwhile, the manually counted and physically delivered COCs from the provincial and/or city board of canvassers will be sent first to the Senate then it will be brought to the Batasang Pambansa Complex, the home of the House of Representatives upon the convening of both the Senate and the House of Representatives in a joint session.

The canvassing committee would tabulate the results of each COC in the order they were received electronically in the Consolidation and Canvassing System (CCS) and physically delivered to Congress for manually prepared COCs with no electronic transmission.

The committee would then compare the electronically received COC from the physically delivered COC for any discrepancy. In cases of discrepancies, Congress may summon the chairperson of the provincial/city board of canvassers from where city/province the COC came from. For overseas absentee voting COCs, the board of canvassers could contacted through any forms of communication deemed safe and reliable by the committee. Absentee votes among Philippine citizens who lived overseas would be included by the time the Philippine Congress declared a winner.

After all of the COCs were canvassed, the joint committee would furnish a report to be approved by majority vote by both House and Senate voting separately.

== Members of the canvassing committee ==
Instead of the whole Congress canvassing the votes, a committee comprised evenly between the Senate and the House of Representatives will canvass the votes at the Batasang Pambansa Complex in Quezon City, the home of the House of Representatives. Senate Majority Leader Migz Zubiri and House Majority Leader Martin Romualdez co-chaired the proceedings instead of Senate President Tito Sotto and House Speaker Lord Allan Velasco. Senate Majority Floor Leader Zubiri announced the composition of the Senate delegation on May 23, while Speaker Velasco announced theirs on May 24.

| Senate | Position | House of Representatives |
|---|---|---|
| Senate Majority Leader Migz Zubiri (Independent) | Co-chairpersons | House Majority Leader Martin Romualdez (Leyte, Lakas) |
| Senate President pro tempore Ralph Recto (Nacionalista); Senate Minority Leader Franklin Drilon (Liberal); Nancy Binay (UNA); Pia Cayetano (Nacionalista); Grace Poe (Independent); Imee Marcos (Nacionalista) | Members | Manuel Jose Dalipe (Zamboanga City, Lakas); Juliet Marie Ferrer (Negros Occidental, NUP); Sharon Garin (AAMBIS-OWA party-list); Jesus Crispin Remulla (Cavite, NUP); Kristine Singson-Meehan (Ilocos Sur, NPC); Abraham Tolentino (Cavite, NUP) |
| Ronald dela Rosa (PDP–Laban); Risa Hontiveros (Akbayan); Lito Lapid (NPC); Koko Pimentel (PDP–Laban) | Alternates | Juan Pablo Bondoc (Pampanga, PDP–Laban); Alfredo Garbin Jr. (Ako Bicol party-list); Johnny Pimentel (Surigao del Sur, PDP–Laban); Stella Quimbo (Marikina, Liberal) |

== Presidential election ==
| Candidate | Party | Votes | % |
|---|---|---|---|
| Bongbong Marcos | Partido Federal ng Pilipinas | 31,629,783 | 58.77 |
| Leni Robredo | Independent (Note: Liberal Party member running as an independent) | 15,035,773 | 27.94 |
| Manny Pacquiao | PROMDI | 3,663,113 | 6.81 |
| Isko Moreno | Aksyon Demokratiko | 1,933,909 | 3.59 |
| Panfilo Lacson | Independent (Note: Originally ran under Partido para sa Demokratikong Reporma; resigned from the party mid-way through the campaign. Still labeled as a Reporma candidate on the official ballots.) | 892,375 | 1.66 |
| Faisal Mangondato | Katipunan ng Kamalayang Kayumanggi | 301,629 | 0.56 |
| Ernesto Abella | Independent | 114,627 | 0.21 |
| Leody de Guzman | Partido Lakas ng Masa | 93,027 | 0.17 |
| Norberto Gonzales | Partido Demokratiko Sosyalista ng Pilipinas | 90,656 | 0.17 |
| Jose Montemayor Jr. | Democratic Party of the Philippines | 60,592 | 0.11 |
| Total | | 53,815,484 | 100.00 |
| Valid votes | | 53,815,484 | 96.05 |
| Invalid/blank votes | | 2,213,371 | 3.95 |
| Total votes | | 56,028,855 | 100.00 |
| Registered voters/turnout | | 67,523,697 | 82.98 |
Source: Congress (vote totals); COMELEC (election day turnout, absentee turnout)

| Province/City/ Absentee voters | Marcos | | Robredo | | Pacquiao | | Moreno | | Lacson | | Mangondato | | Abella | | De Guzman | | Gonzales | | Montemayor | |
| Province/City/ Absentee voters | Votes | % | Votes | % | Votes | % | Votes | % | Votes | % | Votes | % | Votes | % | Votes | % | Votes | % | Votes | % |
|---|---|---|---|---|---|---|---|---|---|---|---|---|---|---|---|---|---|---|---|---|
| Abra | 147,812 | 95.29 | 4,502 | 2.90 | 588 | 0.38 | 708 | 0.46 | 921 | 0.59 | 63 | 0.04 | 178 | 0.11 | 113 | 0.07 | 129 | 0.08 | 96 | 0.06 |
| Agusan del Norte | 301,264 | 74.55 | 46,203 | 11.43 | 41,070 | 10.16 | 8,477 | 2.10 | 3,060 | 0.76 | 544 | 0.13 | 1,206 | 0.30 | 643 | 0.16 | 1,113 | 0.28 | 534 | 0.13 |
| Agusan del Sur | 153,310 | 44.75 | 145,198 | 42.38 | 36,059 | 10.53 | 2,797 | 0.82 | 1,567 | 0.46 | 221 | 0.06 | 1,602 | 0.47 | 519 | 0.15 | 868 | 0.25 | 434 | 0.13 |
| Aklan | 146,323 | 43.44 | 146,284 | 43.43 | 20,087 | 5.96 | 16,764 | 4.98 | 4,238 | 1.26 | 506 | 0.15 | 949 | 0.28 | 587 | 0.17 | 548 | 0.16 | 574 | 0.17 |
| Albay | 112,651 | 15.05 | 608,779 | 81.34 | 8,557 | 1.14 | 6,331 | 0.85 | 4,992 | 0.67 | 614 | 0.08 | 2,207 | 0.29 | 1,743 | 0.23 | 1,736 | 0.23 | 845 | 0.11 |
| Antique | 115,027 | 36.07 | 142,663 | 44.73 | 30,190 | 9.47 | 22,126 | 6.94 | 5,312 | 1.67 | 303 | 0.10 | 1,147 | 0.36 | 846 | 0.27 | 685 | 0.21 | 641 | 0.20 |
| Apayao | 60,181 | 93.72 | 1,879 | 2.93 | 906 | 1.41 | 368 | 0.57 | 449 | 0.70 | 27 | 0.04 | 121 | 0.19 | 84 | 0.13 | 75 | 0.12 | 124 | 0.19 |
| Aurora | 83,719 | 66.26 | 29,660 | 23.48 | 6,071 | 4.81 | 3,026 | 2.40 | 2,960 | 2.34 | 116 | 0.09 | 243 | 0.19 | 203 | 0.16 | 187 | 0.15 | 161 | 0.13 |
| Bacolod | 121,179 | 43.38 | 112,051 | 40.12 | 25,611 | 9.17 | 12,060 | 4.32 | 5,474 | 1.96 | 202 | 0.07 | 1,345 | 0.48 | 602 | 0.22 | 503 | 0.18 | 292 | 0.10 |
| Baguio | 98,286 | 71.12 | 27,796 | 20.11 | 1,765 | 1.28 | 3,301 | 2.39 | 5,889 | 4.26 | 643 | 0.47 | 124 | 0.09 | 144 | 0.10 | 90 | 0.07 | 154 | 0.11 |
| Basilan | 147,121 | 69.27 | 51,511 | 24.25 | 4,074 | 1.92 | 3,823 | 1.80 | 750 | 0.35 | 3,923 | 1.85 | 586 | 0.28 | 162 | 0.08 | 315 | 0.15 | 126 | 0.06 |
| Bataan | 334,642 | 68.82 | 109,757 | 22.57 | 7,452 | 1.53 | 21,158 | 4.35 | 9,767 | 2.01 | 453 | 0.09 | 671 | 0.14 | 544 | 0.11 | 1,508 | 0.31 | 324 | 0.07 |
| Batanes | 4,358 | 39.19 | 5,195 | 46.71 | 182 | 1.64 | 725 | 6.52 | 567 | 5.10 | 7 | 0.06 | 17 | 0.15 | 34 | 0.31 | 25 | 0.22 | 11 | 0.10 |
| Batangas | 719,971 | 46.35 | 656,166 | 42.25 | 36,290 | 2.34 | 88,559 | 5.70 | 43,195 | 2.78 | 1,352 | 0.09 | 2,188 | 0.14 | 2,361 | 0.15 | 1,969 | 0.13 | 1,179 | 0.08 |
| Benguet | 166,541 | 80.94 | 21,682 | 10.54 | 5,299 | 2.58 | 3,697 | 1.80 | 7,594 | 3.69 | 124 | 0.06 | 168 | 0.08 | 187 | 0.09 | 195 | 0.09 | 265 | 0.13 |
| Biliran | 60,687 | 64.44 | 11,851 | 12.58 | 17,347 | 18.42 | 2,445 | 2.60 | 856 | 0.91 | 152 | 0.16 | 327 | 0.35 | 199 | 0.21 | 159 | 0.17 | 149 | 0.16 |
| Bohol | 501,637 | 64.37 | 141,018 | 18.09 | 88,938 | 11.41 | 27,334 | 3.51 | 13,058 | 1.68 | 803 | 0.10 | 2,255 | 0.29 | 1,354 | 0.17 | 1,768 | 0.23 | 1,182 | 0.15 |
| Bukidnon | 514,945 | 67.74 | 80,450 | 10.58 | 130,762 | 17.20 | 15,884 | 2.09 | 7,143 | 0.94 | 1,932 | 0.25 | 3,156 | 0.42 | 2,289 | 0.30 | 2,002 | 0.26 | 1,605 | 0.21 |
| Bulacan | 1,040,157 | 60.29 | 500,285 | 29.00 | 36,467 | 2.11 | 92,610 | 5.37 | 44,934 | 2.60 | 1,517 | 0.09 | 2,399 | 0.14 | 3,056 | 0.18 | 2,312 | 0.13 | 1,380 | 0.08 |
| Cagayan | 556,613 | 89.01 | 47,384 | 7.58 | 5,505 | 0.88 | 5,644 | 0.90 | 6,001 | 0.96 | 577 | 0.09 | 1,163 | 0.19 | 1,037 | 0.17 | 739 | 0.12 | 651 | 0.10 |
| Cagayan de Oro | 237,653 | 76.99 | 34,372 | 11.13 | 25,220 | 8.17 | 5,556 | 1.80 | 3,585 | 1.16 | 550 | 0.18 | 531 | 0.17 | 409 | 0.13 | 464 | 0.15 | 360 | 0.12 |
| Caloocan | 361,464 | 62.79 | 153,205 | 26.61 | 10,756 | 1.87 | 34,252 | 5.95 | 13,398 | 2.33 | 460 | 0.08 | 397 | 0.07 | 786 | 0.14 | 525 | 0.09 | 473 | 0.08 |
| Camarines Norte | 66,995 | 20.78 | 239,353 | 74.24 | 6,133 | 1.90 | 4,426 | 1.37 | 2,486 | 0.77 | 300 | 0.09 | 951 | 0.29 | 730 | 0.23 | 677 | 0.21 | 359 | 0.11 |
| Camarines Sur | 102,921 | 9.51 | 958,905 | 88.56 | 6,950 | 0.64 | 3,936 | 0.36 | 3,198 | 0.30 | 564 | 0.05 | 2,992 | 0.28 | 1,225 | 0.11 | 1,271 | 0.12 | 764 | 0.07 |
| Camiguin | 45,321 | 85.94 | 4,591 | 8.71 | 1,717 | 3.26 | 505 | 0.96 | 232 | 0.44 | 35 | 0.07 | 76 | 0.14 | 71 | 0.13 | 62 | 0.12 | 125 | 0.24 |
| Capiz | 165,903 | 38.63 | 216,236 | 50.35 | 21,667 | 5.04 | 16,543 | 3.85 | 4,336 | 1.01 | 351 | 0.08 | 1,585 | 0.37 | 1,099 | 0.26 | 1,150 | 0.27 | 611 | 0.14 |
| Catanduanes | 31,454 | 18.99 | 123,805 | 74.75 | 3,543 | 2.14 | 2,567 | 1.55 | 2,101 | 1.27 | 143 | 0.09 | 713 | 0.43 | 477 | 0.29 | 393 | 0.24 | 425 | 0.26 |
| Cavite | 1,121,668 | 60.90 | 497,898 | 27.03 | 40,054 | 2.17 | 80,484 | 4.37 | 91,677 | 4.98 | 2,378 | 0.13 | 1,899 | 0.10 | 2,485 | 0.13 | 1,746 | 0.09 | 1,476 | 0.08 |
| Cebu | 1,055,985 | 55.29 | 391,080 | 20.48 | 371,183 | 19.44 | 52,504 | 2.75 | 24,270 | 1.27 | 1,347 | 0.07 | 3,875 | 0.20 | 3,559 | 0.19 | 3,315 | 0.17 | 2,750 | 0.14 |
| Cebu City | 344,876 | 57.88 | 160,890 | 27.00 | 50,145 | 8.42 | 22,478 | 3.77 | 12,567 | 2.11 | 569 | 0.10 | 1,376 | 0.23 | 1,187 | 0.20 | 1,056 | 0.18 | 716 | 0.12 |
| Cotabato | 460,650 | 73.83 | 85,562 | 13.71 | 45,038 | 7.22 | 15,721 | 2.52 | 7,834 | 1.26 | 4,788 | 0.77 | 1,299 | 0.21 | 1,074 | 0.17 | 1,228 | 0.20 | 757 | 0.12 |
| Davao City | 649,725 | 90.54 | 31,961 | 4.45 | 14,319 | 2.00 | 6,839 | 0.95 | 7,448 | 1.04 | 2,242 | 0.31 | 2,262 | 0.32 | 894 | 0.12 | 1,227 | 0.17 | 682 | 0.10 |
| Davao de Oro | 343,929 | 81.64 | 22,677 | 5.38 | 41,861 | 9.94 | 4,258 | 1.01 | 3,925 | 0.93 | 822 | 0.20 | 1,043 | 0.25 | 929 | 0.22 | 1,254 | 0.30 | 587 | 0.14 |
| Davao del Norte | 470,567 | 84.50 | 39,373 | 7.07 | 30,733 | 5.52 | 4,844 | 0.87 | 6,826 | 1.23 | 1,155 | 0.21 | 1,041 | 0.19 | 873 | 0.16 | 853 | 0.15 | 621 | 0.11 |
| Davao del Sur | 290,669 | 81.27 | 19,690 | 5.51 | 36,802 | 10.29 | 4,125 | 1.15 | 2,837 | 0.79 | 897 | 0.25 | 794 | 0.22 | 621 | 0.17 | 737 | 0.21 | 482 | 0.13 |
| Davao Occidental | 102,265 | 73.87 | 2,981 | 2.15 | 30,363 | 21.93 | 723 | 0.52 | 438 | 0.32 | 704 | 0.51 | 332 | 0.24 | 202 | 0.15 | 265 | 0.19 | 161 | 0.12 |
| Davao Oriental | 233,632 | 74.59 | 19,424 | 6.20 | 49,109 | 15.68 | 3,983 | 1.27 | 2,411 | 0.77 | 1,140 | 0.36 | 1,180 | 0.38 | 803 | 0.26 | 799 | 0.26 | 725 | 0.23 |
| Dinagat Islands | 46,898 | 75.35 | 10,690 | 17.17 | 3,242 | 5.21 | 619 | 0.99 | 278 | 0.45 | 35 | 0.06 | 173 | 0.28 | 124 | 0.20 | 112 | 0.18 | 73 | 0.12 |
| Eastern Samar | 107,419 | 39.22 | 124,393 | 45.42 | 27,366 | 9.99 | 8,660 | 3.16 | 2,806 | 1.02 | 190 | 0.07 | 1,113 | 0.41 | 683 | 0.25 | 906 | 0.33 | 361 | 0.13 |
| General Santos | 152,703 | 56.47 | 27,344 | 10.11 | 81,351 | 30.09 | 3,482 | 1.29 | 3,053 | 1.13 | 1,107 | 0.41 | 348 | 0.13 | 315 | 0.12 | 292 | 0.11 | 398 | 0.15 |
| Guimaras | 25,792 | 24.96 | 66,071 | 63.93 | 6,796 | 6.58 | 3,045 | 2.95 | 857 | 0.83 | 35 | 0.03 | 269 | 0.26 | 182 | 0.18 | 126 | 0.12 | 168 | 0.16 |
| Ifugao | 82,479 | 74.96 | 15,585 | 14.16 | 6,573 | 5.97 | 2,233 | 2.03 | 2,417 | 2.20 | 73 | 0.07 | 173 | 0.16 | 154 | 0.14 | 127 | 0.12 | 222 | 0.20 |
| Iligan | 107,514 | 71.79 | 18,857 | 12.59 | 15,092 | 10.08 | 3,843 | 2.57 | 1,822 | 1.22 | 1,583 | 1.06 | 371 | 0.25 | 226 | 0.15 | 274 | 0.18 | 179 | 0.12 |
| Ilocos Norte | 356,221 | 95.84 | 10,043 | 2.70 | 1,046 | 0.28 | 1,426 | 0.38 | 1,928 | 0.52 | 164 | 0.04 | 280 | 0.08 | 200 | 0.05 | 192 | 0.05 | 193 | 0.05 |
| Ilocos Sur | 391,973 | 94.79 | 15,671 | 3.79 | 1,282 | 0.31 | 1,511 | 0.37 | 1,756 | 0.42 | 343 | 0.08 | 385 | 0.09 | 216 | 0.05 | 220 | 0.05 | 176 | 0.04 |
| Iloilo | 374,144 | 34.77 | 579,525 | 53.86 | 72,381 | 6.73 | 29,669 | 2.76 | 10,915 | 1.01 | 696 | 0.06 | 2,974 | 0.28 | 2,479 | 0.23 | 1,922 | 0.18 | 1,334 | 0.12 |
| Iloilo City | 85,117 | 33.58 | 149,256 | 58.88 | 7,978 | 3.15 | 6,821 | 2.69 | 3,038 | 1.20 | 150 | 0.06 | 249 | 0.10 | 286 | 0.11 | 302 | 0.12 | 299 | 0.12 |
| Isabela | 763,274 | 86.50 | 82,132 | 9.31 | 13,040 | 1.48 | 9,468 | 1.07 | 8,302 | 0.94 | 775 | 0.09 | 1,960 | 0.22 | 1,287 | 0.15 | 1,099 | 0.12 | 1,050 | 0.12 |
| Kalinga | 117,391 | 89.76 | 8,440 | 6.45 | 1,472 | 1.13 | 1,071 | 0.82 | 1,365 | 1.04 | 180 | 0.14 | 220 | 0.17 | 207 | 0.16 | 145 | 0.11 | 293 | 0.22 |
| La Union | 425,792 | 92.29 | 24,566 | 5.32 | 2,859 | 0.62 | 2,868 | 0.62 | 3,378 | 0.73 | 262 | 0.06 | 472 | 0.10 | 564 | 0.12 | 337 | 0.07 | 266 | 0.06 |
| Laguna | 939,775 | 57.74 | 510,931 | 31.39 | 36,336 | 2.23 | 86,879 | 5.34 | 43,439 | 2.67 | 1,690 | 0.10 | 2,298 | 0.14 | 2,655 | 0.16 | 2,101 | 0.13 | 1,368 | 0.08 |
| Lanao del Norte | 185,872 | 61.47 | 47,581 | 15.74 | 34,614 | 11.45 | 8,047 | 2.66 | 1,812 | 0.60 | 22,237 | 7.35 | 733 | 0.24 | 528 | 0.17 | 543 | 0.18 | 394 | 0.13 |
| Lanao del Sur | 145,155 | 29.45 | 126,326 | 25.63 | 7,057 | 1.43 | 29,880 | 6.06 | 1,759 | 0.36 | 180,131 | 36.55 | 810 | 0.16 | 525 | 0.11 | 836 | 0.17 | 374 | 0.08 |
| Lapu-Lapu City | 145,823 | 69.49 | 37,336 | 17.79 | 16,794 | 8.00 | 5,597 | 2.67 | 2,707 | 1.29 | 415 | 0.20 | 301 | 0.14 | 282 | 0.13 | 333 | 0.16 | 263 | 0.13 |
| Las Piñas | 137,114 | 57.32 | 78,928 | 32.99 | 4,128 | 1.73 | 11,488 | 4.80 | 6,419 | 2.68 | 183 | 0.08 | 181 | 0.08 | 388 | 0.16 | 223 | 0.09 | 172 | 0.07 |
| Leyte | 825,707 | 76.99 | 127,223 | 11.86 | 78,208 | 7.29 | 20,262 | 1.89 | 11,478 | 1.07 | 883 | 0.08 | 2,915 | 0.27 | 2,319 | 0.22 | 2,088 | 0.19 | 1,406 | 0.13 |
| Maguindanao | 310,545 | 48.97 | 267,894 | 42.24 | 13,863 | 2.19 | 24,904 | 3.93 | 2,656 | 0.42 | 10,486 | 1.65 | 1,652 | 0.26 | 603 | 0.10 | 1,190 | 0.19 | 416 | 0.07 |
| Makati | 207,527 | 55.86 | 130,743 | 35.19 | 5,346 | 1.44 | 15,842 | 4.26 | 10,564 | 2.84 | 162 | 0.04 | 226 | 0.06 | 552 | 0.15 | 288 | 0.08 | 278 | 0.07 |
| Malabon | 119,475 | 61.98 | 51,405 | 26.67 | 3,682 | 1.91 | 12,449 | 6.46 | 4,802 | 2.49 | 71 | 0.04 | 181 | 0.09 | 364 | 0.19 | 188 | 0.10 | 147 | 0.08 |
| Mandaluyong | 101,625 | 55.95 | 64,054 | 35.27 | 2,479 | 1.36 | 7,998 | 4.40 | 4,574 | 2.52 | 95 | 0.05 | 153 | 0.08 | 323 | 0.18 | 218 | 0.12 | 112 | 0.06 |
| Manila | 358,875 | 40.91 | 197,573 | 22.52 | 7,119 | 0.81 | 297,532 | 33.92 | 11,691 | 1.33 | 1,807 | 0.21 | 413 | 0.05 | 1,102 | 0.13 | 556 | 0.06 | 553 | 0.06 |
| Marikina | 114,956 | 50.68 | 92,264 | 40.67 | 3,670 | 1.62 | 8,412 | 3.71 | 6,362 | 2.80 | 191 | 0.08 | 119 | 0.05 | 498 | 0.22 | 189 | 0.08 | 178 | 0.08 |
| Marinduque | 55,278 | 41.09 | 54,379 | 40.42 | 9,865 | 7.33 | 9,807 | 7.29 | 3,814 | 2.84 | 94 | 0.07 | 416 | 0.31 | 427 | 0.32 | 276 | 0.21 | 171 | 0.13 |
| Masbate | 162,037 | 37.24 | 186,998 | 42.97 | 64,480 | 14.82 | 9,388 | 2.16 | 4,008 | 0.92 | 655 | 0.15 | 3,581 | 0.82 | 1,521 | 0.35 | 1,804 | 0.41 | 696 | 0.16 |
| Misamis Occidental | 258,153 | 74.33 | 33,290 | 9.59 | 47,403 | 13.65 | 4,573 | 1.32 | 1,811 | 0.52 | 206 | 0.06 | 439 | 0.13 | 548 | 0.16 | 537 | 0.15 | 332 | 0.10 |
| Misamis Oriental | 386,706 | 71.01 | 58,306 | 10.71 | 76,766 | 14.10 | 12,881 | 2.37 | 4,599 | 0.84 | 794 | 0.15 | 1,487 | 0.27 | 1,095 | 0.20 | 1,245 | 0.23 | 723 | 0.13 |
| Mountain Province | 75,705 | 81.04 | 8,765 | 9.38 | 3,603 | 3.86 | 1,985 | 2.12 | 2,708 | 2.90 | 49 | 0.05 | 156 | 0.17 | 176 | 0.19 | 106 | 0.11 | 165 | 0.18 |
| Muntinlupa | 136,465 | 54.75 | 88,889 | 35.67 | 5,056 | 2.03 | 11,254 | 4.52 | 6,105 | 2.45 | 415 | 0.17 | 233 | 0.09 | 393 | 0.16 | 218 | 0.09 | 203 | 0.08 |
| Navotas | 86,062 | 67.54 | 26,310 | 20.65 | 2,231 | 1.75 | 9,838 | 7.72 | 2,515 | 1.97 | 39 | 0.03 | 83 | 0.07 | 168 | 0.13 | 104 | 0.08 | 79 | 0.06 |
| Negros Occidental | 482,979 | 38.55 | 528,097 | 42.15 | 178,245 | 14.23 | 33,374 | 2.66 | 16,314 | 1.30 | 1,061 | 0.08 | 4,688 | 0.37 | 3,204 | 0.26 | 2,865 | 0.23 | 2,137 | 0.17 |
| Negros Oriental | 258,114 | 36.43 | 180,368 | 25.46 | 223,589 | 31.56 | 20,067 | 2.83 | 14,875 | 2.10 | 997 | 0.14 | 3,878 | 0.55 | 2,497 | 0.35 | 2,409 | 0.34 | 1,683 | 0.24 |
| Northern Samar | 127,538 | 37.65 | 159,372 | 47.04 | 34,445 | 10.17 | 9,980 | 2.95 | 3,075 | 0.91 | 324 | 0.10 | 1,750 | 0.52 | 931 | 0.27 | 891 | 0.26 | 472 | 0.14 |
| Nueva Ecija | 945,388 | 75.15 | 236,827 | 18.83 | 13,665 | 1.09 | 27,862 | 2.21 | 26,795 | 2.13 | 1,244 | 0.10 | 1,956 | 0.16 | 1,576 | 0.13 | 1,602 | 0.13 | 1,005 | 0.08 |
| Nueva Vizcaya | 200,111 | 81.66 | 25,339 | 10.34 | 7,932 | 3.24 | 5,499 | 2.24 | 4,546 | 1.86 | 302 | 0.12 | 367 | 0.15 | 377 | 0.15 | 232 | 0.09 | 335 | 0.14 |
| Occidental Mindoro | 123,387 | 48.83 | 84,321 | 33.37 | 22,276 | 8.81 | 11,847 | 4.69 | 8,570 | 3.39 | 210 | 0.08 | 799 | 0.32 | 408 | 0.16 | 467 | 0.18 | 422 | 0.17 |
| Oriental Mindoro | 192,890 | 42.93 | 179,007 | 39.84 | 45,611 | 10.15 | 18,631 | 4.15 | 9,899 | 2.20 | 351 | 0.08 | 678 | 0.15 | 1,198 | 0.27 | 651 | 0.14 | 361 | 0.08 |
| Palawan | 269,647 | 45.36 | 147,684 | 24.84 | 133,059 | 22.38 | 23,951 | 4.03 | 11,212 | 1.89 | 2,757 | 0.46 | 2,024 | 0.34 | 1,198 | 0.20 | 1,760 | 0.30 | 1,142 | 0.19 |
| Pampanga | 865,122 | 64.35 | 370,624 | 27.57 | 24,158 | 1.80 | 56,796 | 4.22 | 19,142 | 1.42 | 1,354 | 0.10 | 1,933 | 0.14 | 1,605 | 0.12 | 2,471 | 0.18 | 1,156 | 0.09 |
| Pangasinan | 1,378,128 | 77.99 | 280,156 | 15.86 | 29,341 | 1.66 | 42,397 | 2.40 | 24,013 | 1.36 | 1,701 | 0.10 | 3,531 | 0.20 | 3,150 | 0.18 | 2,786 | 0.16 | 1,776 | 0.10 |
| Parañaque | 151,638 | 53.83 | 104,716 | 37.17 | 5,339 | 1.90 | 11,366 | 4.03 | 6,898 | 2.45 | 551 | 0.20 | 261 | 0.09 | 420 | 0.15 | 286 | 0.10 | 229 | 0.08 |
| Pasay | 135,852 | 62.12 | 62,830 | 28.73 | 3,264 | 1.49 | 10,868 | 4.97 | 4,662 | 2.13 | 448 | 0.20 | 152 | 0.07 | 303 | 0.14 | 196 | 0.09 | 118 | 0.05 |
| Pasig | 207,399 | 53.87 | 141,041 | 36.63 | 7,261 | 1.89 | 14,183 | 3.68 | 12,824 | 3.33 | 653 | 0.17 | 268 | 0.07 | 756 | 0.20 | 358 | 0.09 | 281 | 0.07 |
| Quezon | 442,393 | 37.44 | 609,973 | 51.63 | 53,754 | 4.55 | 40,705 | 3.45 | 26,918 | 2.28 | 786 | 0.07 | 2,348 | 0.20 | 1,982 | 0.17 | 1,662 | 0.14 | 1,012 | 0.09 |
| Quezon City | 646,443 | 57.33 | 386,561 | 34.28 | 16,634 | 1.48 | 45,776 | 4.06 | 25,909 | 2.30 | 1,897 | 0.17 | 734 | 0.07 | 1,599 | 0.14 | 1,042 | 0.09 | 917 | 0.08 |
| Quirino | 84,515 | 82.20 | 8,134 | 7.91 | 4,726 | 4.60 | 2,545 | 2.48 | 2,093 | 2.04 | 77 | 0.07 | 169 | 0.16 | 165 | 0.16 | 114 | 0.11 | 276 | 0.27 |
| Rizal | 765,644 | 60.00 | 371,399 | 29.11 | 32,395 | 2.54 | 57,590 | 4.51 | 41,578 | 3.26 | 1,454 | 0.11 | 1,145 | 0.09 | 2,246 | 0.18 | 1,503 | 0.12 | 1,064 | 0.08 |
| Romblon | 71,127 | 42.72 | 65,142 | 39.13 | 12,445 | 7.48 | 10,895 | 6.54 | 5,511 | 3.31 | 109 | 0.07 | 374 | 0.22 | 274 | 0.16 | 256 | 0.15 | 347 | 0.21 |
| Samar | 286,876 | 59.60 | 127,020 | 26.39 | 49,446 | 10.27 | 9,980 | 2.07 | 3,884 | 0.81 | 388 | 0.08 | 1,726 | 0.36 | 604 | 0.13 | 949 | 0.20 | 471 | 0.10 |
| San Juan | 42,636 | 53.05 | 30,392 | 37.82 | 1,201 | 1.49 | 3,069 | 3.82 | 2,511 | 3.12 | 262 | 0.33 | 60 | 0.07 | 122 | 0.15 | 61 | 0.08 | 49 | 0.06 |
| Sarangani | 79,362 | 30.10 | 13,782 | 5.23 | 163,494 | 62.02 | 2,154 | 0.82 | 1,154 | 0.44 | 1,374 | 0.52 | 744 | 0.28 | 394 | 0.15 | 510 | 0.19 | 668 | 0.25 |
| Siquijor | 31,412 | 50.79 | 17,753 | 28.70 | 8,224 | 13.30 | 2,658 | 4.30 | 1,040 | 1.68 | 55 | 0.09 | 191 | 0.31 | 164 | 0.27 | 120 | 0.19 | 233 | 0.38 |
| Sorsogon | 90,523 | 20.10 | 333,614 | 74.09 | 9,986 | 2.22 | 6,849 | 1.52 | 4,153 | 0.92 | 486 | 0.11 | 1,619 | 0.36 | 1,381 | 0.31 | 1,073 | 0.24 | 603 | 0.13 |
| South Cotabato | 323,846 | 65.89 | 67,139 | 13.66 | 79,636 | 16.20 | 9,361 | 1.90 | 6,450 | 1.31 | 1,260 | 0.26 | 1,082 | 0.22 | 973 | 0.20 | 1,040 | 0.21 | 675 | 0.14 |
| Southern Leyte | 157,970 | 66.73 | 34,560 | 14.60 | 21,598 | 9.12 | 18,651 | 7.88 | 2,009 | 0.85 | 269 | 0.11 | 515 | 0.22 | 432 | 0.18 | 437 | 0.18 | 297 | 0.13 |
| Sultan Kudarat | 253,700 | 68.22 | 64,983 | 17.47 | 31,803 | 8.55 | 10,522 | 2.83 | 3,209 | 0.86 | 4,229 | 1.14 | 1,408 | 0.38 | 794 | 0.21 | 803 | 0.22 | 440 | 0.12 |
| Sulu | 350,588 | 95.78 | 10,190 | 2.78 | 1,922 | 0.53 | 1,525 | 0.42 | 345 | 0.09 | 824 | 0.23 | 175 | 0.05 | 65 | 0.02 | 346 | 0.09 | 67 | 0.02 |
| Surigao del Norte | 227,194 | 71.86 | 46,228 | 14.62 | 30,892 | 9.77 | 5,263 | 1.66 | 3,294 | 1.04 | 513 | 0.16 | 1,062 | 0.34 | 546 | 0.17 | 746 | 0.24 | 413 | 0.13 |
| Surigao del Sur | 249,177 | 67.85 | 45,812 | 12.47 | 58,632 | 15.97 | 6,079 | 1.66 | 2,861 | 0.78 | 582 | 0.16 | 1,024 | 0.28 | 1,298 | 0.35 | 1,006 | 0.27 | 779 | 0.21 |
| Taguig–Pateros | 255,233 | 63.96 | 107,025 | 26.82 | 7,604 | 1.91 | 16,763 | 4.20 | 8,985 | 2.25 | 1,737 | 0.44 | 326 | 0.08 | 647 | 0.16 | 367 | 0.09 | 392 | 0.10 |
| Tarlac | 426,626 | 55.61 | 291,410 | 37.99 | 12,513 | 1.63 | 21,660 | 2.82 | 9,830 | 1.28 | 649 | 0.08 | 1,422 | 0.19 | 1,040 | 0.14 | 1,399 | 0.18 | 573 | 0.07 |
| Tawi-Tawi | 143,630 | 82.08 | 13,563 | 7.75 | 11,531 | 6.59 | 2,884 | 1.65 | 537 | 0.31 | 1,562 | 0.89 | 421 | 0.24 | 184 | 0.11 | 479 | 0.27 | 193 | 0.11 |
| Valenzuela | 225,021 | 62.61 | 101,529 | 28.25 | 6,958 | 1.94 | 14,573 | 4.05 | 9,701 | 2.70 | 185 | 0.05 | 258 | 0.07 | 632 | 0.18 | 300 | 0.08 | 260 | 0.07 |
| Zambales | 291,252 | 65.23 | 114,105 | 25.55 | 10,487 | 2.35 | 17,214 | 3.86 | 9,969 | 2.23 | 878 | 0.20 | 703 | 0.16 | 752 | 0.17 | 633 | 0.14 | 532 | 0.12 |
| Zamboanga City | 226,081 | 67.88 | 55,398 | 16.63 | 25,955 | 7.79 | 15,335 | 4.60 | 5,117 | 1.54 | 2,214 | 0.66 | 693 | 0.21 | 646 | 0.19 | 1,005 | 0.30 | 612 | 0.18 |
| Zamboanga del Norte | 284,009 | 51.34 | 105,722 | 19.11 | 139,236 | 25.17 | 12,373 | 2.24 | 3,546 | 0.64 | 2,866 | 0.52 | 1,437 | 0.26 | 1,119 | 0.20 | 1,675 | 0.30 | 1,208 | 0.22 |
| Zamboanga del Sur | 354,364 | 66.61 | 58,595 | 11.01 | 99,554 | 18.71 | 10,210 | 1.92 | 3,024 | 0.57 | 2,037 | 0.38 | 1,297 | 0.24 | 711 | 0.13 | 1,444 | 0.27 | 763 | 0.14 |
| Zamboanga Sibugay | 168,271 | 53.39 | 46,147 | 14.64 | 85,414 | 27.10 | 8,013 | 2.54 | 2,219 | 0.70 | 2,005 | 0.64 | 1,147 | 0.36 | 695 | 0.22 | 746 | 0.24 | 495 | 0.16 |
| Special Geographic Area | 8,773 | 13.53 | 51,849 | 79.96 | 615 | 0.95 | 2,200 | 3.39 | 73 | 0.11 | 818 | 1.26 | 80 | 0.12 | 29 | 0.04 | 381 | 0.59 | 28 | 0.04 |
| Local absentee voters | 67,225 | 91.25 | 3,440 | 4.67 | 347 | 0.47 | 1,058 | 1.44 | 938 | 1.27 | 582 | 0.79 | 13 | 0.02 | 13 | 0.02 | 29 | 0.04 | 23 | 0.03 |
| Detainee voters | 44 | 43.14 | 43 | 42.16 | 7 | 6.86 | 3 | 2.94 | 2 | 1.96 | 2 | 1.96 | 0 | 0.00 | 1 | 0.98 | 0 | 0.00 | 0 | 0.00 |
| Argentina | — | — | — | — | — | — | — | — | — | — | — | — | — | — | — | — | — | — | — | — |
| Australia | 4,162 | 43.95 | 4,487 | 47.39 | 135 | 1.43 | 419 | 4.42 | 218 | 2.30 | 2 | 0.02 | 9 | 0.10 | 8 | 0.08 | 22 | 0.23 | 7 | 0.07 |
| Austria | 774 | 60.42 | 391 | 30.52 | 8 | 0.62 | 75 | 5.85 | 28 | 2.19 | 0 | 0.00 | 2 | 0.16 | 1 | 0.08 | 1 | 0.08 | 1 | 0.08 |
| Bahrain | 11,219 | 81.05 | 1,856 | 13.41 | 86 | 0.62 | 477 | 3.45 | 162 | 1.17 | 25 | 0.18 | 1 | 0.01 | 4 | 0.03 | 8 | 0.06 | 4 | 0.03 |
| Bangladesh | 152 | 59.84 | 72 | 28.35 | 0 | 0.00 | 13 | 5.12 | 10 | 3.94 | 1 | 0.39 | 2 | 0.79 | 1 | 0.39 | 2 | 0.79 | 1 | 0.39 |
| Belgium | 958 | 57.37 | 590 | 35.33 | 16 | 0.96 | 77 | 4.61 | 22 | 1.32 | 0 | 0.00 | 2 | 0.12 | 2 | 0.12 | 2 | 0.12 | 1 | 0.06 |
| Brazil | 275 | 77.46 | 51 | 14.37 | 1 | 0.28 | 20 | 5.63 | 7 | 1.97 | 1 | 0.28 | 0 | 0.00 | 0 | 0.00 | 0 | 0.00 | 0 | 0.00 |
| Brunei | 4,318 | 82.63 | 652 | 12.48 | 25 | 0.48 | 164 | 3.14 | 50 | 0.96 | 6 | 0.11 | 5 | 0.10 | 2 | 0.04 | 3 | 0.06 | 1 | 0.02 |
| Cambodia | 1,370 | 70.55 | 424 | 21.83 | 37 | 1.91 | 64 | 3.30 | 37 | 1.91 | 0 | 0.00 | 7 | 0.36 | 1 | 0.05 | 2 | 0.10 | 0 | 0.00 |
| Canada | 19,872 | 62.75 | 9,411 | 29.72 | 379 | 1.20 | 1,465 | 4.63 | 455 | 1.44 | 3 | 0.01 | 21 | 0.07 | 23 | 0.07 | 29 | 0.09 | 9 | 0.03 |
| Chile | 352 | 80.73 | 55 | 12.61 | 4 | 0.92 | 18 | 4.13 | 7 | 1.61 | 0 | 0.00 | 0 | 0.00 | 0 | 0.00 | 0 | 0.00 | 0 | 0.00 |
| China | 58,160 | 82.31 | 9,059 | 12.82 | 648 | 0.92 | 2,288 | 3.24 | 372 | 0.53 | 6 | 0.01 | 29 | 0.04 | 15 | 0.02 | 36 | 0.05 | 43 | 0.06 |
| Czech Republic | 509 | 75.07 | 129 | 19.03 | 7 | 1.03 | 21 | 3.10 | 11 | 1.62 | 0 | 0.00 | 0 | 0.00 | 1 | 0.15 | 0 | 0.00 | 0 | 0.00 |
| Denmark | 402 | 61.85 | 195 | 30.00 | 5 | 0.77 | 34 | 5.23 | 12 | 1.85 | 0 | 0.00 | 0 | 0.00 | 0 | 0.00 | 2 | 0.31 | 0 | 0.00 |
| Egypt | 801 | 70.70 | 235 | 20.74 | 6 | 0.53 | 72 | 6.35 | 8 | 0.71 | 10 | 0.88 | 0 | 0.00 | 1 | 0.09 | 0 | 0.00 | 0 | 0.00 |
| France | 2,242 | 65.75 | 897 | 26.30 | 19 | 0.56 | 173 | 5.07 | 63 | 1.85 | 4 | 0.12 | 3 | 0.09 | 3 | 0.09 | 3 | 0.09 | 3 | 0.09 |
| Germany | 2,596 | 59.16 | 1,375 | 31.34 | 52 | 1.19 | 243 | 5.54 | 81 | 1.85 | 1 | 0.02 | 13 | 0.30 | 5 | 0.11 | 16 | 0.36 | 6 | 0.14 |
| Greece | 1,710 | 77.13 | 418 | 18.85 | 13 | 0.59 | 65 | 2.93 | 9 | 0.41 | 0 | 0.00 | 1 | 0.05 | 1 | 0.05 | 0 | 0.00 | 0 | 0.00 |
| Guam | 3,176 | 60.35 | 1,653 | 31.41 | 56 | 1.06 | 294 | 5.59 | 76 | 1.44 | 0 | 0.00 | 2 | 0.04 | 3 | 0.06 | 2 | 0.04 | 1 | 0.02 |
| Hungary | 271 | 63.62 | 117 | 27.46 | 3 | 0.70 | 26 | 6.10 | 7 | 1.64 | 0 | 0.00 | 0 | 0.00 | 1 | 0.23 | 0 | 0.00 | 1 | 0.23 |
| India | 31 | 51.67 | 21 | 35.00 | 0 | 0.00 | 7 | 11.67 | 1 | 1.67 | 0 | 0.00 | 0 | 0.00 | 0 | 0.00 | 0 | 0.00 | 0 | 0.00 |
| Indonesia | 802 | 46.30 | 785 | 45.32 | 14 | 0.81 | 67 | 3.87 | 57 | 3.29 | 0 | 0.00 | 3 | 0.17 | 1 | 0.06 | 3 | 0.17 | 0 | 0.00 |
| Iran | 102 | 68.92 | 31 | 20.95 | 2 | 1.35 | 8 | 5.41 | 2 | 1.35 | 0 | 0.00 | 0 | 0.00 | 0 | 0.00 | 2 | 1.35 | 1 | 0.68 |
| Israel | 6,447 | 82.22 | 1,003 | 12.79 | 67 | 0.85 | 265 | 3.38 | 53 | 0.68 | 0 | 0.00 | 2 | 0.03 | 1 | 0.01 | 2 | 0.03 | 1 | 0.01 |
| Italy | 11,272 | 67.29 | 4,179 | 24.95 | 188 | 1.12 | 898 | 5.36 | 186 | 1.11 | 1 | 0.01 | 7 | 0.04 | 9 | 0.05 | 8 | 0.05 | 4 | 0.02 |
| Japan | 25,410 | 76.41 | 5,490 | 16.51 | 331 | 1.00 | 1,572 | 4.73 | 329 | 0.99 | 4 | 0.01 | 39 | 0.12 | 29 | 0.09 | 35 | 0.11 | 15 | 0.05 |
| Jordan | 1,952 | 84.54 | 241 | 10.44 | 11 | 0.48 | 85 | 3.68 | 11 | 0.48 | 8 | 0.35 | 1 | 0.04 | 0 | 0.00 | 0 | 0.00 | 0 | 0.00 |
| Kenya | 212 | 73.10 | 61 | 21.03 | 3 | 1.03 | 7 | 2.41 | 4 | 1.38 | 1 | 0.34 | 1 | 0.34 | 1 | 0.34 | 0 | 0.00 | 0 | 0.00 |
| Kuwait | 20,241 | 85.84 | 2,276 | 9.65 | 153 | 0.65 | 686 | 2.91 | 157 | 0.67 | 50 | 0.21 | 2 | 0.01 | 6 | 0.03 | 7 | 0.03 | 2 | 0.01 |
| Laos | 428 | 73.04 | 111 | 18.94 | 8 | 1.37 | 18 | 3.07 | 19 | 3.24 | 0 | 0.00 | 0 | 0.00 | 0 | 0.00 | 1 | 0.17 | 1 | 0.17 |
| Lebanon | 3,526 | 87.13 | 374 | 9.24 | 14 | 0.35 | 114 | 2.82 | 11 | 0.27 | 4 | 0.10 | 0 | 0.00 | 1 | 0.02 | 1 | 0.02 | 2 | 0.05 |
| Malaysia | 4,482 | 78.14 | 965 | 16.82 | 36 | 0.63 | 163 | 2.84 | 73 | 1.27 | 2 | 0.03 | 3 | 0.05 | 3 | 0.05 | 9 | 0.16 | 0 | 0.00 |
| Mexico | 120 | 60.91 | 52 | 26.40 | 2 | 1.02 | 14 | 7.11 | 9 | 4.57 | 0 | 0.00 | 0 | 0.00 | 0 | 0.00 | 0 | 0.00 | 0 | 0.00 |
| Morocco | 443 | 82.80 | 63 | 11.78 | 4 | 0.75 | 20 | 3.74 | 4 | 0.75 | 0 | 0.00 | 1 | 0.19 | 0 | 0.00 | 0 | 0.00 | 0 | 0.00 |
| Myanmar | 96 | 63.58 | 44 | 29.14 | 5 | 3.31 | 4 | 2.65 | 2 | 1.32 | 0 | 0.00 | 0 | 0.00 | 0 | 0.00 | 0 | 0.00 | 0 | 0.00 |
| Netherlands | 865 | 52.87 | 649 | 39.67 | 12 | 0.73 | 67 | 4.10 | 34 | 2.08 | 0 | 0.00 | 3 | 0.18 | 4 | 0.24 | 2 | 0.12 | 0 | 0.00 |
| New Zealand | 7,620 | 68.62 | 2,664 | 23.99 | 140 | 1.26 | 413 | 3.72 | 226 | 2.04 | 3 | 0.03 | 13 | 0.12 | 6 | 0.05 | 12 | 0.11 | 8 | 0.07 |
| Nigeria | 316 | 75.78 | 79 | 18.94 | 2 | 0.48 | 12 | 2.88 | 6 | 1.44 | 0 | 0.00 | 0 | 0.00 | 0 | 0.00 | 2 | 0.48 | 0 | 0.00 |
| Norway | 497 | 66.44 | 194 | 25.94 | 14 | 1.87 | 28 | 3.74 | 12 | 1.60 | 0 | 0.00 | 1 | 0.13 | 1 | 0.13 | 1 | 0.13 | 0 | 0.00 |
| Oman | 6,457 | 79.76 | 1,153 | 14.24 | 43 | 0.53 | 307 | 3.79 | 115 | 1.42 | 11 | 0.14 | 3 | 0.04 | 1 | 0.01 | 4 | 0.05 | 2 | 0.02 |
| Pakistan | 161 | 77.78 | 27 | 13.04 | 1 | 0.48 | 14 | 6.76 | 3 | 1.45 | 0 | 0.00 | 1 | 0.48 | 0 | 0.00 | 0 | 0.00 | 0 | 0.00 |
| Papua New Guinea | 844 | 63.03 | 389 | 29.05 | 16 | 1.19 | 53 | 3.96 | 33 | 2.46 | 0 | 0.00 | 1 | 0.07 | 1 | 0.07 | 0 | 0.00 | 2 | 0.15 |
| Poland | 253 | 64.38 | 105 | 26.72 | 7 | 1.78 | 21 | 5.34 | 6 | 1.53 | 0 | 0.00 | 0 | 0.00 | 0 | 0.00 | 0 | 0.00 | 1 | 0.25 |
| Portugal | 780 | 78.23 | 174 | 17.45 | 9 | 0.90 | 19 | 1.91 | 12 | 1.20 | 0 | 0.00 | 1 | 0.10 | 0 | 0.00 | 1 | 0.10 | 1 | 0.10 |
| Qatar | 15,563 | 76.10 | 3,509 | 17.16 | 109 | 0.53 | 825 | 4.03 | 323 | 1.58 | 60 | 0.29 | 18 | 0.09 | 16 | 0.08 | 18 | 0.09 | 10 | 0.05 |
| Russia | 1,228 | 87.46 | 102 | 7.26 | 17 | 1.21 | 43 | 3.06 | 10 | 0.71 | 0 | 0.00 | 2 | 0.14 | 0 | 0.00 | 2 | 0.14 | 0 | 0.00 |
| Saudi Arabia | 49,483 | 78.88 | 9,136 | 14.56 | 382 | 0.61 | 2,372 | 3.78 | 707 | 1.13 | 553 | 0.88 | 28 | 0.04 | 30 | 0.05 | 31 | 0.05 | 9 | 0.01 |
| Singapore | 36,806 | 69.88 | 12,283 | 23.32 | 324 | 0.62 | 1,971 | 3.74 | 1,136 | 2.16 | 2 | 0.00 | 26 | 0.05 | 27 | 0.05 | 82 | 0.16 | 12 | 0.02 |
| South Africa | 251 | 67.84 | 95 | 25.68 | 3 | 0.81 | 15 | 4.05 | 4 | 1.08 | 0 | 0.00 | 0 | 0.00 | 2 | 0.54 | 0 | 0.00 | 0 | 0.00 |
| South Korea | 2,283 | 77.73 | 503 | 17.13 | 20 | 0.68 | 88 | 3.00 | 31 | 1.06 | 1 | 0.03 | 7 | 0.24 | 1 | 0.03 | 3 | 0.10 | 0 | 0.00 |
| Spain | 9,529 | 76.41 | 2,303 | 18.47 | 85 | 0.68 | 433 | 3.47 | 98 | 0.79 | 1 | 0.01 | 3 | 0.02 | 11 | 0.09 | 5 | 0.04 | 3 | 0.02 |
| Sweden | 569 | 57.88 | 345 | 35.10 | 6 | 0.61 | 44 | 4.48 | 16 | 1.63 | 0 | 0.00 | 1 | 0.10 | 1 | 0.10 | 1 | 0.10 | 0 | 0.00 |
| Switzerland | 1,833 | 56.21 | 1,139 | 34.93 | 40 | 1.23 | 175 | 5.37 | 52 | 1.59 | 1 | 0.03 | 6 | 0.18 | 5 | 0.15 | 5 | 0.15 | 5 | 0.15 |
| Syria | — | — | — | — | — | — | — | — | — | — | — | — | — | — | — | — | — | — | — | — |
| Taiwan | 23,906 | 90.48 | 1,873 | 7.09 | 149 | 0.56 | 354 | 1.34 | 110 | 0.42 | 0 | 0.00 | 6 | 0.02 | 8 | 0.03 | 8 | 0.03 | 7 | 0.03 |
| Thailand | 4,554 | 72.32 | 1,388 | 22.04 | 65 | 1.03 | 153 | 2.43 | 99 | 1.57 | 2 | 0.03 | 12 | 0.19 | 9 | 0.14 | 10 | 0.16 | 5 | 0.08 |
| Timor-Leste | 270 | 78.49 | 57 | 16.57 | 3 | 0.87 | 9 | 2.62 | 5 | 1.45 | 0 | 0.00 | 0 | 0.00 | 0 | 0.00 | 0 | 0.00 | 0 | 0.00 |
| Turkey | 1,357 | 81.26 | 228 | 13.65 | 7 | 0.42 | 60 | 3.59 | 14 | 0.84 | 2 | 0.12 | 0 | 0.00 | 1 | 0.06 | 1 | 0.06 | 0 | 0.00 |
| United Arab Emirates | 76,819 | 79.25 | 15,260 | 15.74 | 471 | 0.49 | 2,736 | 2.82 | 1,409 | 1.45 | 68 | 0.07 | 40 | 0.04 | 44 | 0.05 | 63 | 0.06 | 25 | 0.03 |
| United Kingdom | 8,886 | 55.71 | 5,573 | 34.94 | 194 | 1.22 | 900 | 5.64 | 330 | 2.07 | 8 | 0.05 | 17 | 0.11 | 13 | 0.08 | 21 | 0.13 | 9 | 0.06 |
| United States | 35,228 | 46.80 | 32,319 | 42.93 | 1,455 | 1.93 | 4,763 | 6.33 | 1,290 | 1.71 | 15 | 0.02 | 60 | 0.08 | 69 | 0.09 | 41 | 0.05 | 40 | 0.05 |
| Vatican City | 98 | 30.72 | 191 | 59.87 | 4 | 1.25 | 23 | 7.21 | 3 | 0.94 | 0 | 0.00 | 0 | 0.00 | 0 | 0.00 | 0 | 0.00 | 0 | 0.00 |
| Vietnam | 643 | 63.41 | 297 | 29.29 | 12 | 1.18 | 33 | 3.25 | 19 | 1.87 | 1 | 0.10 | 3 | 0.30 | 3 | 0.30 | 3 | 0.30 | 0 | 0.00 |
| Total | 31,629,783 | 58.77 | 15,035,773 | 27.94 | 3,663,113 | 6.81 | 1,933,909 | 3.59 | 892,375 | 1.66 | 301,629 | 0.56 | 114,627 | 0.21 | 93,027 | 0.17 | 90,656 | 0.17 | 60,592 | 0.11 |
Source: Senate, House of Representatives

== Vice presidential election ==
| Candidate | Party | Votes | % |
|---|---|---|---|
| Sara Duterte (Note: Running mate of Bongbong Marcos (Partido Federal ng Pilipinas)) | Lakas–CMD | 32,208,417 | 61.53 |
| Kiko Pangilinan (Note: Running mate of Leni Robredo (Independent)) | Liberal Party | 9,329,207 | 17.82 |
| Tito Sotto (Note: Running mate of Panfilo Lacson (Independent)) | Nationalist People's Coalition | 8,251,267 | 15.76 |
| Willie Ong | Aksyon Demokratiko | 1,878,531 | 3.59 |
| Lito Atienza | PROMDI | 270,381 | 0.52 |
| Manny SD Lopez | Labor Party Philippines | 159,670 | 0.31 |
| Walden Bello | Partido Lakas ng Masa | 100,827 | 0.19 |
| Carlos Serapio | Katipunan ng Kamalayang Kayumanggi | 90,989 | 0.17 |
| Rizalito David | Democratic Party of the Philippines | 56,711 | 0.11 |
| Total | | 52,346,000 | 100.00 |
| Valid votes | | 52,346,000 | 93.43 |
| Invalid/blank votes | | 3,682,855 | 6.57 |
| Total votes | | 56,028,855 | 100.00 |
| Registered voters/turnout | | 67,523,697 | 82.98 |
Source: Congress (vote totals); COMELEC (election day turnout, absentee turnout)

| Province/City/ Absentee voters | Duterte | | Pangilinan | | Sotto | | Ong | | Atienza | | Lopez | | Bello | | Serapio | | David | |
| Province/City/ Absentee voters | Votes | % | Votes | % | Votes | % | Votes | % | Votes | % | Votes | % | Votes | % | Votes | % | Votes | % |
|---|---|---|---|---|---|---|---|---|---|---|---|---|---|---|---|---|---|---|
| Abra | 138,862 | 91.23 | 3,585 | 2.36 | 7,513 | 4.94 | 1,416 | 0.93 | 260 | 0.17 | 156 | 0.10 | 180 | 0.12 | 153 | 0.10 | 84 | 0.06 |
| Agusan del Norte | 342,492 | 87.27 | 23,709 | 6.04 | 16,242 | 4.14 | 4,001 | 1.02 | 3,219 | 0.82 | 963 | 0.25 | 530 | 0.14 | 564 | 0.14 | 711 | 0.18 |
| Agusan del Sur | 295,982 | 89.49 | 13,676 | 4.13 | 14,573 | 4.41 | 1,806 | 0.55 | 2,016 | 0.61 | 1,127 | 0.34 | 570 | 0.17 | 698 | 0.21 | 306 | 0.09 |
| Aklan | 140,172 | 42.97 | 91,665 | 28.10 | 76,230 | 23.37 | 13,745 | 4.21 | 2,088 | 0.64 | 745 | 0.23 | 674 | 0.21 | 564 | 0.17 | 336 | 0.10 |
| Albay | 144,717 | 20.10 | 444,396 | 61.71 | 90,406 | 12.55 | 28,558 | 3.97 | 3,356 | 0.47 | 2,596 | 0.36 | 2,847 | 0.40 | 1,913 | 0.27 | 1,300 | 0.18 |
| Antique | 111,309 | 36.54 | 103,175 | 33.87 | 69,417 | 22.79 | 14,365 | 4.72 | 2,510 | 0.82 | 1,484 | 0.49 | 1,088 | 0.36 | 801 | 0.26 | 463 | 0.15 |
| Apayao | 54,077 | 86.80 | 1,825 | 2.93 | 5,109 | 8.20 | 570 | 0.91 | 169 | 0.27 | 189 | 0.30 | 124 | 0.20 | 158 | 0.25 | 81 | 0.13 |
| Aurora | 74,194 | 59.91 | 20,402 | 16.48 | 23,722 | 19.16 | 4,271 | 3.45 | 526 | 0.42 | 282 | 0.23 | 180 | 0.15 | 170 | 0.14 | 86 | 0.07 |
| Bacolod | 120,394 | 44.09 | 76,095 | 27.86 | 60,139 | 22.02 | 12,238 | 4.48 | 2,006 | 0.73 | 932 | 0.34 | 645 | 0.24 | 375 | 0.14 | 266 | 0.10 |
| Baguio | 91,536 | 66.50 | 21,328 | 15.49 | 17,848 | 12.97 | 6,163 | 4.48 | 291 | 0.21 | 111 | 0.08 | 194 | 0.14 | 123 | 0.09 | 59 | 0.04 |
| Basilan | 175,991 | 85.24 | 20,520 | 9.94 | 7,671 | 3.72 | 918 | 0.44 | 389 | 0.19 | 398 | 0.19 | 211 | 0.10 | 238 | 0.12 | 122 | 0.06 |
| Bataan | 286,358 | 59.69 | 64,899 | 13.53 | 103,596 | 21.60 | 22,018 | 4.59 | 1,135 | 0.24 | 532 | 0.11 | 476 | 0.10 | 413 | 0.09 | 285 | 0.06 |
| Batanes | 4,523 | 41.86 | 3,511 | 32.49 | 2,351 | 21.76 | 330 | 3.05 | 28 | 0.26 | 23 | 0.21 | 22 | 0.20 | 10 | 0.09 | 7 | 0.06 |
| Batangas | 668,608 | 43.99 | 397,115 | 26.13 | 357,129 | 23.50 | 83,898 | 5.52 | 6,737 | 0.44 | 2,168 | 0.14 | 2,175 | 0.14 | 1,364 | 0.09 | 751 | 0.05 |
| Benguet | 147,563 | 72.87 | 14,786 | 7.30 | 33,380 | 16.48 | 5,329 | 2.63 | 483 | 0.24 | 331 | 0.16 | 254 | 0.13 | 220 | 0.11 | 156 | 0.08 |
| Biliran | 62,717 | 72.07 | 8,270 | 9.50 | 11,572 | 13.30 | 2,364 | 2.72 | 1,051 | 1.21 | 398 | 0.46 | 235 | 0.27 | 289 | 0.33 | 127 | 0.15 |
| Bohol | 594,024 | 78.85 | 75,125 | 9.97 | 59,894 | 7.95 | 13,644 | 1.81 | 4,820 | 0.64 | 2,431 | 0.32 | 1,343 | 0.18 | 1,321 | 0.18 | 725 | 0.10 |
| Bukidnon | 604,014 | 83.43 | 49,482 | 6.83 | 45,903 | 6.34 | 6,051 | 0.84 | 6,266 | 0.87 | 5,356 | 0.74 | 2,546 | 0.35 | 2,383 | 0.33 | 1,993 | 0.28 |
| Bulacan | 881,722 | 51.60 | 267,111 | 15.63 | 456,241 | 26.70 | 93,371 | 5.46 | 3,728 | 0.22 | 1,908 | 0.11 | 2,147 | 0.13 | 1,847 | 0.11 | 812 | 0.05 |
| Cagayan | 481,655 | 79.52 | 41,863 | 6.91 | 65,397 | 10.80 | 9,696 | 1.60 | 1,609 | 0.27 | 1,987 | 0.33 | 1,412 | 0.23 | 1,388 | 0.23 | 707 | 0.12 |
| Cagayan de Oro | 263,560 | 86.38 | 20,919 | 6.86 | 13,769 | 4.51 | 3,895 | 1.28 | 1,402 | 0.46 | 540 | 0.18 | 406 | 0.13 | 360 | 0.12 | 260 | 0.09 |
| Caloocan | 341,898 | 59.72 | 89,340 | 15.60 | 100,903 | 17.62 | 37,761 | 6.60 | 1,040 | 0.18 | 422 | 0.07 | 633 | 0.11 | 375 | 0.07 | 172 | 0.03 |
| Camarines Norte | 70,089 | 22.37 | 171,125 | 54.62 | 53,982 | 17.23 | 13,721 | 4.38 | 1,373 | 0.44 | 985 | 0.31 | 865 | 0.28 | 744 | 0.24 | 402 | 0.13 |
| Camarines Sur | 154,508 | 15.01 | 732,711 | 71.17 | 108,485 | 10.54 | 21,090 | 2.05 | 4,252 | 0.41 | 2,921 | 0.28 | 2,263 | 0.22 | 2,298 | 0.22 | 1,009 | 0.10 |
| Camiguin | 49,359 | 94.27 | 1,823 | 3.48 | 682 | 1.30 | 285 | 0.54 | 57 | 0.11 | 41 | 0.08 | 52 | 0.10 | 42 | 0.08 | 17 | 0.03 |
| Capiz | 176,636 | 43.24 | 142,084 | 34.78 | 68,876 | 16.86 | 13,623 | 3.33 | 2,368 | 0.58 | 1,822 | 0.45 | 1,437 | 0.35 | 1,096 | 0.27 | 574 | 0.14 |
| Catanduanes | 36,363 | 22.78 | 78,731 | 49.31 | 35,887 | 22.48 | 5,521 | 3.46 | 944 | 0.59 | 758 | 0.47 | 608 | 0.38 | 540 | 0.34 | 309 | 0.19 |
| Cavite | 1,031,607 | 56.51 | 297,184 | 16.28 | 376,987 | 20.65 | 108,841 | 5.96 | 4,960 | 0.27 | 1,703 | 0.09 | 2,236 | 0.12 | 1,349 | 0.07 | 768 | 0.04 |
| Cebu | 1,258,538 | 69.09 | 235,010 | 12.90 | 247,093 | 13.56 | 38,284 | 2.10 | 22,124 | 1.21 | 7,434 | 0.41 | 3,439 | 0.19 | 3,695 | 0.20 | 5,987 | 0.33 |
| Cebu City | 382,498 | 64.81 | 84,284 | 14.28 | 100,883 | 17.09 | 15,945 | 2.70 | 2,973 | 0.50 | 1,239 | 0.21 | 992 | 0.17 | 709 | 0.12 | 673 | 0.11 |
| Cotabato | 552,096 | 89.80 | 24,071 | 3.92 | 27,806 | 4.52 | 3,720 | 0.61 | 2,111 | 0.34 | 2,044 | 0.33 | 1,129 | 0.18 | 1,155 | 0.19 | 698 | 0.11 |
| Davao City | 688,065 | 95.61 | 11,072 | 1.54 | 12,398 | 1.72 | 4,023 | 0.56 | 820 | 0.11 | 2,009 | 0.28 | 600 | 0.08 | 413 | 0.06 | 294 | 0.04 |
| Davao de Oro | 378,850 | 91.81 | 11,027 | 2.67 | 15,437 | 3.74 | 2,131 | 0.52 | 2,193 | 0.53 | 1,155 | 0.28 | 830 | 0.20 | 652 | 0.16 | 355 | 0.09 |
| Davao del Norte | 500,116 | 90.60 | 10,494 | 1.90 | 33,598 | 6.09 | 3,138 | 0.57 | 1,712 | 0.31 | 942 | 0.17 | 867 | 0.16 | 685 | 0.12 | 443 | 0.08 |
| Davao del Sur | 320,131 | 91.31 | 8,542 | 2.44 | 14,136 | 4.03 | 2,282 | 0.65 | 1,635 | 0.47 | 1,315 | 0.38 | 1,417 | 0.40 | 646 | 0.18 | 502 | 0.14 |
| Davao Occidental | 119,019 | 90.71 | 3,199 | 2.44 | 4,850 | 3.70 | 671 | 0.51 | 1,345 | 1.03 | 1,138 | 0.87 | 351 | 0.27 | 434 | 0.33 | 199 | 0.15 |
| Davao Oriental | 273,292 | 90.23 | 9,848 | 3.25 | 12,136 | 4.01 | 1,838 | 0.61 | 1,927 | 0.64 | 1,650 | 0.54 | 898 | 0.30 | 889 | 0.29 | 410 | 0.14 |
| Dinagat Islands | 51,104 | 84.41 | 6,361 | 10.51 | 2,013 | 3.32 | 406 | 0.67 | 212 | 0.35 | 141 | 0.23 | 132 | 0.22 | 119 | 0.20 | 58 | 0.10 |
| Eastern Samar | 119,686 | 46.80 | 66,389 | 25.96 | 55,457 | 21.69 | 9,348 | 3.66 | 1,876 | 0.73 | 1,161 | 0.45 | 727 | 0.28 | 681 | 0.27 | 394 | 0.15 |
| General Santos | 196,976 | 74.32 | 21,186 | 7.99 | 32,117 | 12.12 | 6,141 | 2.32 | 6,398 | 2.41 | 1,023 | 0.39 | 468 | 0.18 | 388 | 0.15 | 323 | 0.12 |
| Guimaras | 25,537 | 25.87 | 52,982 | 53.67 | 15,575 | 15.78 | 3,166 | 3.21 | 696 | 0.71 | 292 | 0.30 | 200 | 0.20 | 140 | 0.14 | 122 | 0.12 |
| Ifugao | 73,753 | 69.06 | 13,335 | 12.49 | 14,680 | 13.75 | 3,252 | 3.05 | 434 | 0.41 | 605 | 0.57 | 253 | 0.24 | 324 | 0.30 | 157 | 0.15 |
| Iligan | 124,559 | 84.19 | 10,546 | 7.13 | 8,885 | 6.01 | 2,103 | 1.42 | 965 | 0.65 | 340 | 0.23 | 209 | 0.14 | 234 | 0.16 | 111 | 0.08 |
| Ilocos Norte | 342,554 | 93.80 | 7,973 | 2.18 | 10,303 | 2.82 | 2,708 | 0.74 | 379 | 0.10 | 325 | 0.09 | 392 | 0.11 | 415 | 0.11 | 144 | 0.04 |
| Ilocos Sur | 366,948 | 90.89 | 12,626 | 3.13 | 17,959 | 4.45 | 4,455 | 1.10 | 461 | 0.11 | 390 | 0.10 | 362 | 0.09 | 356 | 0.09 | 150 | 0.04 |
| Iloilo | 364,898 | 35.32 | 448,171 | 43.37 | 172,034 | 16.65 | 31,910 | 3.09 | 5,993 | 0.58 | 4,076 | 0.39 | 2,814 | 0.27 | 2,202 | 0.21 | 1,154 | 0.11 |
| Iloilo City | 92,946 | 37.21 | 107,465 | 43.02 | 38,432 | 15.38 | 9,021 | 3.61 | 779 | 0.31 | 361 | 0.14 | 291 | 0.12 | 236 | 0.09 | 282 | 0.11 |
| Isabela | 659,696 | 76.83 | 66,280 | 7.72 | 106,130 | 12.36 | 16,079 | 1.87 | 2,871 | 0.33 | 2,294 | 0.27 | 2,666 | 0.31 | 1,846 | 0.22 | 728 | 0.08 |
| Kalinga | 107,673 | 85.02 | 7,230 | 5.71 | 8,222 | 6.49 | 2,098 | 1.66 | 306 | 0.24 | 360 | 0.28 | 287 | 0.23 | 300 | 0.24 | 162 | 0.13 |
| La Union | 379,714 | 83.49 | 19,302 | 4.24 | 45,276 | 9.96 | 8,158 | 1.79 | 617 | 0.14 | 549 | 0.12 | 490 | 0.11 | 456 | 0.10 | 228 | 0.05 |
| Laguna | 823,247 | 51.09 | 306,960 | 19.05 | 373,676 | 23.19 | 96,278 | 5.97 | 4,860 | 0.30 | 1,931 | 0.12 | 2,001 | 0.12 | 1,446 | 0.09 | 967 | 0.06 |
| Lanao del Norte | 232,763 | 80.49 | 24,470 | 8.46 | 22,226 | 7.69 | 4,974 | 1.72 | 2,005 | 0.69 | 1,137 | 0.39 | 568 | 0.20 | 705 | 0.24 | 323 | 0.11 |
| Lanao del Sur | 341,258 | 74.35 | 53,958 | 11.76 | 28,104 | 6.12 | 27,928 | 6.08 | 2,845 | 0.62 | 1,505 | 0.33 | 946 | 0.21 | 1,976 | 0.43 | 448 | 0.10 |
| Lapu-Lapu City | 166,664 | 80.31 | 18,732 | 9.03 | 16,653 | 8.02 | 3,701 | 1.78 | 1,007 | 0.49 | 264 | 0.13 | 175 | 0.08 | 192 | 0.09 | 128 | 0.06 |
| Las Piñas | 133,732 | 56.14 | 54,231 | 22.77 | 32,552 | 13.67 | 16,409 | 6.89 | 508 | 0.21 | 157 | 0.07 | 379 | 0.16 | 137 | 0.06 | 95 | 0.04 |
| Leyte | 792,110 | 78.38 | 72,079 | 7.13 | 115,021 | 11.38 | 17,218 | 1.70 | 6,146 | 0.61 | 2,475 | 0.24 | 2,364 | 0.23 | 1,834 | 0.18 | 1,347 | 0.13 |
| Maguindanao | 583,585 | 93.41 | 22,107 | 3.54 | 10,590 | 1.70 | 3,173 | 0.51 | 1,445 | 0.23 | 1,519 | 0.24 | 831 | 0.13 | 953 | 0.15 | 530 | 0.08 |
| Makati | 202,151 | 54.64 | 95,612 | 25.84 | 43,876 | 11.86 | 26,613 | 7.19 | 710 | 0.19 | 223 | 0.06 | 548 | 0.15 | 167 | 0.05 | 101 | 0.03 |
| Malabon | 108,094 | 56.40 | 29,322 | 15.30 | 40,603 | 21.19 | 12,473 | 6.51 | 415 | 0.22 | 191 | 0.10 | 300 | 0.16 | 190 | 0.10 | 70 | 0.04 |
| Mandaluyong | 98,448 | 54.35 | 44,537 | 24.59 | 25,595 | 14.13 | 11,767 | 6.50 | 291 | 0.16 | 105 | 0.06 | 263 | 0.15 | 96 | 0.05 | 44 | 0.02 |
| Manila | 405,798 | 46.66 | 148,325 | 17.06 | 145,244 | 16.70 | 155,942 | 17.93 | 5,866 | 0.67 | 6,291 | 0.72 | 1,160 | 0.13 | 501 | 0.06 | 495 | 0.06 |
| Marikina | 109,585 | 48.54 | 62,414 | 27.64 | 38,023 | 16.84 | 14,748 | 6.53 | 343 | 0.15 | 102 | 0.05 | 367 | 0.16 | 122 | 0.05 | 77 | 0.03 |
| Marinduque | 55,524 | 42.57 | 34,514 | 26.46 | 31,183 | 23.91 | 7,264 | 5.57 | 748 | 0.57 | 407 | 0.31 | 325 | 0.25 | 260 | 0.20 | 206 | 0.16 |
| Masbate | 175,786 | 44.64 | 120,197 | 30.52 | 73,689 | 18.71 | 11,243 | 2.85 | 4,767 | 1.21 | 3,243 | 0.82 | 2,358 | 0.60 | 1,613 | 0.41 | 928 | 0.24 |
| Misamis Occidental | 295,858 | 88.89 | 16,970 | 5.10 | 14,059 | 4.22 | 2,476 | 0.74 | 1,839 | 0.55 | 668 | 0.20 | 348 | 0.10 | 325 | 0.10 | 291 | 0.09 |
| Misamis Oriental | 440,830 | 84.65 | 36,662 | 7.04 | 27,330 | 5.25 | 6,500 | 1.25 | 3,970 | 0.76 | 2,450 | 0.47 | 1,123 | 0.22 | 1,245 | 0.24 | 687 | 0.13 |
| Mountain Province | 69,950 | 77.17 | 6,977 | 7.70 | 10,002 | 11.03 | 2,625 | 2.90 | 292 | 0.32 | 257 | 0.28 | 267 | 0.29 | 181 | 0.20 | 98 | 0.11 |
| Muntinlupa | 128,145 | 51.73 | 58,583 | 23.65 | 42,082 | 16.99 | 17,584 | 7.10 | 554 | 0.22 | 193 | 0.08 | 315 | 0.13 | 164 | 0.07 | 90 | 0.04 |
| Navotas | 77,542 | 61.35 | 15,743 | 12.46 | 24,232 | 19.17 | 8,202 | 6.49 | 288 | 0.23 | 110 | 0.09 | 130 | 0.10 | 100 | 0.08 | 44 | 0.03 |
| Negros Occidental | 476,475 | 40.17 | 377,115 | 31.79 | 259,485 | 21.88 | 35,723 | 3.01 | 14,658 | 1.24 | 9,347 | 0.79 | 4,426 | 0.37 | 4,471 | 0.38 | 4,426 | 0.37 |
| Negros Oriental | 350,865 | 54.95 | 136,359 | 21.35 | 109,828 | 17.20 | 13,916 | 2.18 | 10,052 | 1.57 | 9,954 | 1.56 | 2,768 | 0.43 | 2,880 | 0.45 | 1,932 | 0.30 |
| Northern Samar | 164,909 | 52.58 | 74,823 | 23.86 | 56,670 | 18.07 | 10,474 | 3.34 | 2,279 | 0.73 | 1,486 | 0.47 | 1,248 | 0.40 | 1,062 | 0.34 | 676 | 0.22 |
| Nueva Ecija | 703,042 | 56.95 | 138,227 | 11.20 | 347,232 | 28.13 | 37,895 | 3.07 | 2,733 | 0.22 | 1,592 | 0.13 | 1,356 | 0.11 | 1,561 | 0.13 | 811 | 0.07 |
| Nueva Vizcaya | 182,477 | 75.54 | 19,162 | 7.93 | 32,106 | 13.29 | 4,988 | 2.06 | 759 | 0.31 | 796 | 0.33 | 438 | 0.18 | 635 | 0.26 | 207 | 0.09 |
| Occidental Mindoro | 106,834 | 43.52 | 55,926 | 22.78 | 70,571 | 28.75 | 7,806 | 3.18 | 1,933 | 0.79 | 1,082 | 0.44 | 447 | 0.18 | 585 | 0.24 | 299 | 0.12 |
| Oriental Mindoro | 177,815 | 40.86 | 123,584 | 28.40 | 107,377 | 24.67 | 17,883 | 4.11 | 5,281 | 1.21 | 1,477 | 0.34 | 636 | 0.15 | 709 | 0.16 | 414 | 0.10 |
| Palawan | 280,832 | 49.70 | 116,791 | 20.67 | 127,937 | 22.64 | 19,839 | 3.51 | 8,659 | 1.53 | 5,620 | 0.99 | 1,665 | 0.29 | 2,241 | 0.40 | 1,420 | 0.25 |
| Pampanga | 737,915 | 55.53 | 202,680 | 15.25 | 334,284 | 25.16 | 45,543 | 3.43 | 3,209 | 0.24 | 1,437 | 0.11 | 1,509 | 0.11 | 1,381 | 0.10 | 937 | 0.07 |
| Pangasinan | 1,057,111 | 60.63 | 172,571 | 9.90 | 429,537 | 24.64 | 65,809 | 3.77 | 5,755 | 0.33 | 4,565 | 0.26 | 3,154 | 0.18 | 3,612 | 0.21 | 1,433 | 0.08 |
| Parañaque | 147,253 | 52.55 | 73,157 | 26.11 | 40,348 | 14.40 | 17,838 | 6.37 | 661 | 0.24 | 237 | 0.08 | 394 | 0.14 | 190 | 0.07 | 129 | 0.05 |
| Pasay | 131,106 | 60.28 | 39,034 | 17.95 | 30,844 | 14.18 | 15,462 | 7.11 | 435 | 0.20 | 154 | 0.07 | 269 | 0.12 | 127 | 0.06 | 63 | 0.03 |
| Pasig | 186,708 | 48.74 | 91,615 | 23.92 | 78,617 | 20.52 | 24,427 | 6.38 | 623 | 0.16 | 215 | 0.06 | 528 | 0.14 | 198 | 0.05 | 106 | 0.03 |
| Quezon | 401,819 | 35.11 | 359,373 | 31.40 | 313,205 | 27.37 | 55,273 | 4.83 | 6,646 | 0.58 | 2,876 | 0.25 | 1,741 | 0.15 | 2,000 | 0.17 | 1,456 | 0.13 |
| Quezon City | 627,661 | 55.96 | 260,332 | 23.21 | 164,943 | 14.71 | 63,537 | 5.66 | 1,777 | 0.16 | 615 | 0.05 | 1,720 | 0.15 | 646 | 0.06 | 378 | 0.03 |
| Quirino | 71,852 | 71.80 | 7,587 | 7.58 | 16,718 | 16.70 | 2,401 | 2.40 | 401 | 0.40 | 443 | 0.44 | 274 | 0.27 | 286 | 0.29 | 117 | 0.12 |
| Rizal | 688,737 | 54.42 | 221,528 | 17.51 | 273,618 | 21.62 | 73,646 | 5.82 | 3,212 | 0.25 | 1,447 | 0.11 | 1,542 | 0.12 | 1,202 | 0.09 | 562 | 0.04 |
| Romblon | 63,684 | 39.92 | 35,550 | 22.29 | 52,100 | 32.66 | 6,345 | 3.98 | 823 | 0.52 | 381 | 0.24 | 278 | 0.17 | 229 | 0.14 | 125 | 0.08 |
| Samar | 280,667 | 61.07 | 90,445 | 19.68 | 73,027 | 15.89 | 8,943 | 1.95 | 2,763 | 0.60 | 1,359 | 0.30 | 798 | 0.17 | 1,166 | 0.25 | 409 | 0.09 |
| San Juan | 42,499 | 53.09 | 22,107 | 27.62 | 9,876 | 12.34 | 5,155 | 6.44 | 152 | 0.19 | 50 | 0.06 | 147 | 0.18 | 39 | 0.05 | 21 | 0.03 |
| Sarangani | 187,202 | 77.23 | 15,140 | 6.25 | 26,633 | 10.99 | 3,135 | 1.29 | 5,048 | 2.08 | 2,709 | 1.12 | 812 | 0.33 | 1,184 | 0.49 | 535 | 0.22 |
| Siquijor | 37,979 | 66.07 | 11,766 | 20.47 | 5,204 | 9.05 | 1,440 | 2.51 | 505 | 0.88 | 261 | 0.45 | 154 | 0.27 | 104 | 0.18 | 66 | 0.11 |
| Sorsogon | 88,438 | 20.34 | 155,110 | 35.68 | 169,546 | 39.00 | 14,646 | 3.37 | 2,062 | 0.47 | 1,633 | 0.38 | 1,256 | 0.29 | 1,335 | 0.31 | 740 | 0.17 |
| South Cotabato | 367,571 | 76.67 | 48,693 | 10.16 | 44,400 | 9.26 | 7,679 | 1.60 | 4,195 | 0.87 | 3,223 | 0.67 | 1,332 | 0.28 | 1,630 | 0.34 | 713 | 0.15 |
| Southern Leyte | 187,226 | 82.29 | 19,364 | 8.51 | 12,203 | 5.36 | 6,087 | 2.68 | 1,164 | 0.51 | 532 | 0.23 | 364 | 0.16 | 354 | 0.16 | 231 | 0.10 |
| Sultan Kudarat | 307,671 | 84.61 | 23,895 | 6.57 | 23,489 | 6.46 | 3,073 | 0.85 | 1,683 | 0.46 | 1,609 | 0.44 | 924 | 0.25 | 862 | 0.24 | 449 | 0.12 |
| Sulu | 355,824 | 97.72 | 5,280 | 1.45 | 2,036 | 0.56 | 407 | 0.11 | 149 | 0.04 | 235 | 0.06 | 75 | 0.02 | 81 | 0.02 | 38 | 0.01 |
| Surigao del Norte | 267,748 | 86.91 | 20,554 | 6.67 | 12,693 | 4.12 | 3,177 | 1.03 | 1,557 | 0.51 | 923 | 0.30 | 500 | 0.16 | 583 | 0.19 | 350 | 0.11 |
| Surigao del Sur | 301,080 | 84.63 | 24,178 | 6.80 | 20,473 | 5.75 | 3,324 | 0.93 | 2,623 | 0.74 | 1,598 | 0.45 | 1,329 | 0.37 | 734 | 0.21 | 430 | 0.12 |
| Taguig–Pateros | 252,075 | 63.55 | 68,641 | 17.30 | 49,137 | 12.39 | 24,853 | 6.27 | 790 | 0.20 | 278 | 0.07 | 516 | 0.13 | 257 | 0.06 | 120 | 0.03 |
| Tarlac | 334,965 | 44.35 | 163,007 | 21.58 | 222,309 | 29.43 | 28,072 | 3.72 | 2,012 | 0.27 | 1,721 | 0.23 | 984 | 0.13 | 1,209 | 0.16 | 1,002 | 0.13 |
| Tawi-Tawi | 151,264 | 89.68 | 9,086 | 5.39 | 5,029 | 2.98 | 950 | 0.56 | 594 | 0.35 | 884 | 0.52 | 284 | 0.17 | 386 | 0.23 | 191 | 0.11 |
| Valenzuela | 214,014 | 59.84 | 59,386 | 16.60 | 59,322 | 16.59 | 23,342 | 6.53 | 610 | 0.17 | 261 | 0.07 | 358 | 0.10 | 272 | 0.08 | 99 | 0.03 |
| Zambales | 246,581 | 56.14 | 74,537 | 16.97 | 89,556 | 20.39 | 24,344 | 5.54 | 1,533 | 0.35 | 936 | 0.21 | 742 | 0.17 | 646 | 0.15 | 368 | 0.08 |
| Zamboanga City | 250,528 | 75.99 | 34,471 | 10.46 | 33,567 | 10.18 | 5,306 | 1.61 | 1,361 | 0.41 | 2,174 | 0.66 | 831 | 0.25 | 1,070 | 0.32 | 392 | 0.12 |
| Zamboanga del Norte | 379,378 | 74.36 | 63,323 | 12.41 | 47,290 | 9.27 | 6,655 | 1.30 | 5,813 | 1.14 | 3,164 | 0.62 | 1,377 | 0.27 | 1,890 | 0.37 | 1,281 | 0.25 |
| Zamboanga del Sur | 397,033 | 80.60 | 28,357 | 5.76 | 53,518 | 10.86 | 4,922 | 1.00 | 3,924 | 0.80 | 2,070 | 0.42 | 897 | 0.18 | 993 | 0.20 | 863 | 0.18 |
| Zamboanga Sibugay | 215,377 | 73.35 | 35,119 | 11.96 | 29,704 | 10.12 | 4,197 | 1.43 | 3,827 | 1.30 | 2,679 | 0.91 | 1,113 | 0.38 | 1,062 | 0.36 | 563 | 0.19 |
| Special Geographic Area | 61,043 | 94.40 | 1,476 | 2.28 | 1,135 | 1.76 | 271 | 0.42 | 59 | 0.09 | 77 | 0.12 | 30 | 0.05 | 23 | 0.04 | 549 | 0.85 |
| Local absentee voters | 69,056 | 93.78 | 1,990 | 2.70 | 1,426 | 1.94 | 1,076 | 1.46 | 36 | 0.05 | 6 | 0.01 | 26 | 0.04 | 9 | 0.01 | 8 | 0.01 |
| Detainee voters | 27 | 28.13 | 32 | 33.33 | 31 | 32.29 | 2 | 2.08 | 3 | 3.13 | 1 | 1.04 | 0 | 0.00 | 0 | 0.00 | 0 | 0.00 |
| Argentina | — | — | — | — | — | — | — | — | — | — | — | — | — | — | — | — | — | — |
| Australia | 4,590 | 48.58 | 3,938 | 41.68 | 296 | 3.13 | 540 | 5.71 | 44 | 0.47 | 8 | 0.08 | 29 | 0.31 | 2 | 0.02 | 2 | 0.02 |
| Austria | 808 | 62.64 | 325 | 25.19 | 58 | 4.50 | 88 | 6.82 | 3 | 0.23 | 1 | 0.08 | 5 | 0.39 | 1 | 0.08 | 1 | 0.08 |
| Bahrain | 11,556 | 83.78 | 1,322 | 9.58 | 361 | 2.62 | 539 | 3.91 | 9 | 0.07 | 2 | 0.01 | 2 | 0.01 | 1 | 0.01 | 1 | 0.01 |
| Bangladesh | 163 | 65.46 | 56 | 22.49 | 9 | 3.61 | 19 | 7.63 | 1 | 0.40 | 0 | 0.00 | 1 | 0.40 | 0 | 0.00 | 0 | 0.00 |
| Belgium | 1,002 | 59.93 | 521 | 31.16 | 51 | 3.05 | 93 | 5.56 | 2 | 0.12 | 1 | 0.06 | 1 | 0.06 | 1 | 0.06 | 0 | 0.00 |
| Brazil | 290 | 81.92 | 38 | 10.73 | 9 | 2.54 | 15 | 4.24 | 1 | 0.28 | 1 | 0.28 | 0 | 0.00 | 0 | 0.00 | 0 | 0.00 |
| Brunei | 4,403 | 84.54 | 461 | 8.85 | 139 | 2.67 | 198 | 3.80 | 3 | 0.06 | 1 | 0.02 | 1 | 0.02 | 1 | 0.02 | 1 | 0.02 |
| Cambodia | 1,421 | 73.17 | 340 | 17.51 | 78 | 4.02 | 95 | 4.89 | 4 | 0.21 | 0 | 0.00 | 4 | 0.21 | 0 | 0.00 | 0 | 0.00 |
| Canada | 20,363 | 64.46 | 7,981 | 25.27 | 1,367 | 4.33 | 1,719 | 5.44 | 83 | 0.26 | 14 | 0.04 | 46 | 0.15 | 10 | 0.03 | 5 | 0.02 |
| Chile | 367 | 83.79 | 42 | 9.59 | 15 | 3.42 | 14 | 3.20 | 0 | 0.00 | 0 | 0.00 | 0 | 0.00 | 0 | 0.00 | 0 | 0.00 |
| China | 58,478 | 83.08 | 6,875 | 9.77 | 1,583 | 2.25 | 3,365 | 4.78 | 54 | 0.08 | 6 | 0.01 | 13 | 0.02 | 7 | 0.01 | 8 | 0.01 |
| Czech Republic | 532 | 78.47 | 96 | 14.16 | 15 | 2.21 | 32 | 4.72 | 1 | 0.15 | 0 | 0.00 | 1 | 0.15 | 1 | 0.15 | 0 | 0.00 |
| Denmark | 434 | 66.56 | 160 | 24.54 | 24 | 3.68 | 30 | 4.60 | 2 | 0.31 | 1 | 0.15 | 1 | 0.15 | 0 | 0.00 | 0 | 0.00 |
| Egypt | 956 | 84.38 | 107 | 9.44 | 13 | 1.15 | 55 | 4.85 | 2 | 0.18 | 0 | 0.00 | 0 | 0.00 | 0 | 0.00 | 0 | 0.00 |
| France | 2,303 | 67.50 | 772 | 22.63 | 119 | 3.49 | 199 | 5.83 | 6 | 0.18 | 0 | 0.00 | 7 | 0.21 | 3 | 0.09 | 3 | 0.09 |
| Germany | 2,798 | 63.61 | 1,113 | 25.30 | 145 | 3.30 | 309 | 7.02 | 14 | 0.32 | 6 | 0.14 | 7 | 0.16 | 2 | 0.05 | 5 | 0.11 |
| Greece | 1,676 | 75.73 | 324 | 14.64 | 73 | 3.30 | 136 | 6.15 | 2 | 0.09 | 1 | 0.05 | 0 | 0.00 | 0 | 0.00 | 1 | 0.05 |
| Guam | 3,208 | 61.29 | 1,263 | 24.13 | 255 | 4.87 | 490 | 9.36 | 14 | 0.27 | 1 | 0.02 | 2 | 0.04 | 0 | 0.00 | 1 | 0.02 |
| Hungary | 288 | 67.76 | 96 | 22.59 | 11 | 2.59 | 25 | 5.88 | 2 | 0.47 | 0 | 0.00 | 1 | 0.24 | 1 | 0.24 | 1 | 0.24 |
| India | 38 | 63.33 | 14 | 23.33 | 6 | 10.00 | 2 | 3.33 | 0 | 0.00 | 0 | 0.00 | 0 | 0.00 | 0 | 0.00 | 0 | 0.00 |
| Indonesia | 890 | 51.21 | 661 | 38.03 | 73 | 4.20 | 104 | 5.98 | 3 | 0.17 | 2 | 0.12 | 5 | 0.29 | 0 | 0.00 | 0 | 0.00 |
| Iran | 102 | 68.92 | 17 | 11.49 | 7 | 4.73 | 15 | 10.14 | 1 | 0.68 | 1 | 0.68 | 2 | 1.35 | 2 | 1.35 | 1 | 0.68 |
| Israel | 6,359 | 81.54 | 668 | 8.57 | 206 | 2.64 | 556 | 7.13 | 6 | 0.08 | 0 | 0.00 | 1 | 0.01 | 2 | 0.03 | 1 | 0.01 |
| Italy | 11,348 | 68.31 | 3,268 | 19.67 | 576 | 3.47 | 1,374 | 8.27 | 22 | 0.13 | 8 | 0.05 | 12 | 0.07 | 2 | 0.01 | 2 | 0.01 |
| Japan | 25,572 | 77.23 | 4,413 | 13.33 | 1,047 | 3.16 | 1,965 | 5.93 | 49 | 0.15 | 16 | 0.05 | 35 | 0.11 | 7 | 0.02 | 7 | 0.02 |
| Jordan | 2,015 | 87.88 | 139 | 6.06 | 54 | 2.35 | 80 | 3.49 | 3 | 0.13 | 1 | 0.04 | 0 | 0.00 | 1 | 0.04 | 0 | 0.00 |
| Kenya | 222 | 76.29 | 47 | 16.15 | 2 | 0.69 | 19 | 6.53 | 0 | 0.00 | 0 | 0.00 | 1 | 0.34 | 0 | 0.00 | 0 | 0.00 |
| Kuwait | 20,749 | 88.42 | 1,535 | 6.54 | 424 | 1.81 | 733 | 3.12 | 14 | 0.06 | 0 | 0.00 | 9 | 0.04 | 3 | 0.01 | 0 | 0.00 |
| Laos | 436 | 75.04 | 95 | 16.35 | 21 | 3.61 | 28 | 4.82 | 1 | 0.17 | 0 | 0.00 | 0 | 0.00 | 0 | 0.00 | 0 | 0.00 |
| Lebanon | 3,511 | 87.38 | 258 | 6.42 | 101 | 2.51 | 139 | 3.46 | 5 | 0.12 | 4 | 0.10 | 0 | 0.00 | 0 | 0.00 | 0 | 0.00 |
| Malaysia | 4,626 | 80.94 | 761 | 13.32 | 113 | 1.98 | 199 | 3.48 | 6 | 0.10 | 1 | 0.02 | 5 | 0.09 | 2 | 0.03 | 2 | 0.03 |
| Mexico | 132 | 65.35 | 44 | 21.78 | 9 | 4.46 | 15 | 7.43 | 2 | 0.99 | 0 | 0.00 | 0 | 0.00 | 0 | 0.00 | 0 | 0.00 |
| Morocco | 459 | 84.84 | 29 | 5.36 | 20 | 3.70 | 28 | 5.18 | 4 | 0.74 | 0 | 0.00 | 1 | 0.18 | 0 | 0.00 | 0 | 0.00 |
| Myanmar | 97 | 63.40 | 37 | 24.18 | 8 | 5.23 | 11 | 7.19 | 0 | 0.00 | 0 | 0.00 | 0 | 0.00 | 0 | 0.00 | 0 | 0.00 |
| Netherlands | 914 | 56.04 | 564 | 34.58 | 36 | 2.21 | 102 | 6.25 | 2 | 0.12 | 1 | 0.06 | 12 | 0.74 | 0 | 0.00 | 0 | 0.00 |
| New Zealand | 8,043 | 72.51 | 2,111 | 19.03 | 340 | 3.07 | 554 | 4.99 | 22 | 0.20 | 3 | 0.03 | 14 | 0.13 | 1 | 0.01 | 4 | 0.04 |
| Nigeria | 319 | 76.68 | 56 | 13.46 | 19 | 4.57 | 22 | 5.29 | 0 | 0.00 | 0 | 0.00 | 0 | 0.00 | 0 | 0.00 | 0 | 0.00 |
| Norway | 532 | 70.84 | 160 | 21.30 | 13 | 1.73 | 44 | 5.86 | 2 | 0.27 | 0 | 0.00 | 0 | 0.00 | 0 | 0.00 | 0 | 0.00 |
| Oman | 6,681 | 83.00 | 784 | 9.74 | 228 | 2.83 | 339 | 4.21 | 5 | 0.06 | 4 | 0.05 | 5 | 0.06 | 1 | 0.01 | 2 | 0.02 |
| Pakistan | 166 | 79.81 | 23 | 11.06 | 9 | 4.33 | 9 | 4.33 | 1 | 0.48 | 0 | 0.00 | 0 | 0.00 | 0 | 0.00 | 0 | 0.00 |
| Papua New Guinea | 895 | 66.69 | 276 | 20.57 | 64 | 4.77 | 105 | 7.82 | 1 | 0.07 | 1 | 0.07 | 0 | 0.00 | 0 | 0.00 | 0 | 0.00 |
| Poland | 267 | 68.11 | 90 | 22.96 | 17 | 4.34 | 16 | 4.08 | 1 | 0.26 | 0 | 0.00 | 1 | 0.26 | 0 | 0.00 | 0 | 0.00 |
| Portugal | 805 | 80.50 | 131 | 13.10 | 25 | 2.50 | 36 | 3.60 | 1 | 0.10 | 0 | 0.00 | 1 | 0.10 | 0 | 0.00 | 1 | 0.10 |
| Qatar | 16,455 | 80.51 | 2,655 | 12.99 | 539 | 2.64 | 746 | 3.65 | 20 | 0.10 | 5 | 0.02 | 16 | 0.08 | 2 | 0.01 | 0 | 0.00 |
| Russia | 1,233 | 88.07 | 66 | 4.71 | 41 | 2.93 | 56 | 4.00 | 3 | 0.21 | 0 | 0.00 | 1 | 0.07 | 0 | 0.00 | 0 | 0.00 |
| Saudi Arabia | 51,928 | 82.92 | 6,440 | 10.28 | 1,605 | 2.56 | 2,554 | 4.08 | 46 | 0.07 | 6 | 0.01 | 32 | 0.05 | 7 | 0.01 | 3 | 0.00 |
| Singapore | 39,100 | 74.35 | 9,975 | 18.97 | 1,320 | 2.51 | 2,031 | 3.86 | 84 | 0.16 | 13 | 0.02 | 57 | 0.11 | 4 | 0.01 | 6 | 0.01 |
| South Africa | 265 | 71.62 | 78 | 21.08 | 18 | 4.86 | 6 | 1.62 | 2 | 0.54 | 0 | 0.00 | 1 | 0.27 | 0 | 0.00 | 0 | 0.00 |
| South Korea | 2,349 | 80.25 | 418 | 14.28 | 58 | 1.98 | 98 | 3.35 | 1 | 0.03 | 0 | 0.00 | 3 | 0.10 | 0 | 0.00 | 0 | 0.00 |
| Spain | 9,588 | 77.31 | 1,787 | 14.41 | 340 | 2.74 | 643 | 5.18 | 22 | 0.18 | 1 | 0.01 | 18 | 0.15 | 2 | 0.02 | 1 | 0.01 |
| Sweden | 600 | 61.10 | 288 | 29.33 | 31 | 3.16 | 54 | 5.50 | 3 | 0.31 | 0 | 0.00 | 5 | 0.51 | 1 | 0.10 | 0 | 0.00 |
| Switzerland | 1,939 | 59.50 | 945 | 29.00 | 131 | 4.02 | 227 | 6.97 | 7 | 0.21 | 1 | 0.03 | 7 | 0.21 | 1 | 0.03 | 1 | 0.03 |
| Syria | — | — | — | — | — | — | — | — | — | — | — | — | — | — | — | — | — | — |
| Taiwan | 24,093 | 91.41 | 1,218 | 4.62 | 384 | 1.46 | 637 | 2.42 | 16 | 0.06 | 1 | 0.00 | 2 | 0.01 | 0 | 0.00 | 7 | 0.03 |
| Thailand | 4,752 | 75.66 | 1,171 | 18.64 | 116 | 1.85 | 219 | 3.49 | 7 | 0.11 | 1 | 0.02 | 15 | 0.24 | 0 | 0.00 | 0 | 0.00 |
| Timor-Leste | 289 | 83.77 | 42 | 12.17 | 6 | 1.74 | 8 | 2.32 | 0 | 0.00 | 0 | 0.00 | 0 | 0.00 | 0 | 0.00 | 0 | 0.00 |
| Turkey | 1,382 | 82.66 | 166 | 9.93 | 43 | 2.57 | 76 | 4.55 | 4 | 0.24 | 0 | 0.00 | 1 | 0.06 | 0 | 0.00 | 0 | 0.00 |
| United Arab Emirates | 79,925 | 82.56 | 11,680 | 12.07 | 2,286 | 2.36 | 2,765 | 2.86 | 65 | 0.07 | 11 | 0.01 | 55 | 0.06 | 10 | 0.01 | 7 | 0.01 |
| United Kingdom | 9,489 | 59.78 | 4,642 | 29.25 | 669 | 4.21 | 978 | 6.16 | 46 | 0.29 | 3 | 0.02 | 39 | 0.25 | 2 | 0.01 | 4 | 0.03 |
| United States | 36,421 | 48.65 | 27,630 | 36.91 | 4,511 | 6.03 | 5,549 | 7.41 | 480 | 0.64 | 55 | 0.07 | 166 | 0.22 | 28 | 0.04 | 24 | 0.03 |
| Vatican City | 126 | 39.62 | 136 | 42.77 | 15 | 4.72 | 33 | 10.38 | 7 | 2.20 | 1 | 0.31 | 0 | 0.00 | 0 | 0.00 | 0 | 0.00 |
| Vietnam | 679 | 67.09 | 247 | 24.41 | 27 | 2.67 | 50 | 4.94 | 2 | 0.20 | 0 | 0.00 | 7 | 0.69 | 0 | 0.00 | 0 | 0.00 |
| Total | 32,208,417 | 61.53 | 9,329,207 | 17.82 | 8,251,267 | 15.76 | 1,878,531 | 3.59 | 270,381 | 0.52 | 159,670 | 0.31 | 100,827 | 0.19 | 90,989 | 0.17 | 56,711 | 0.11 |
Source: Senate, House of Representatives
