= 2022 Philippine presidential election in Zamboanga Sibugay =

- May 9, 2022
- Registered: 422,062
- Turnout: 80.40% (▲1.66pp)
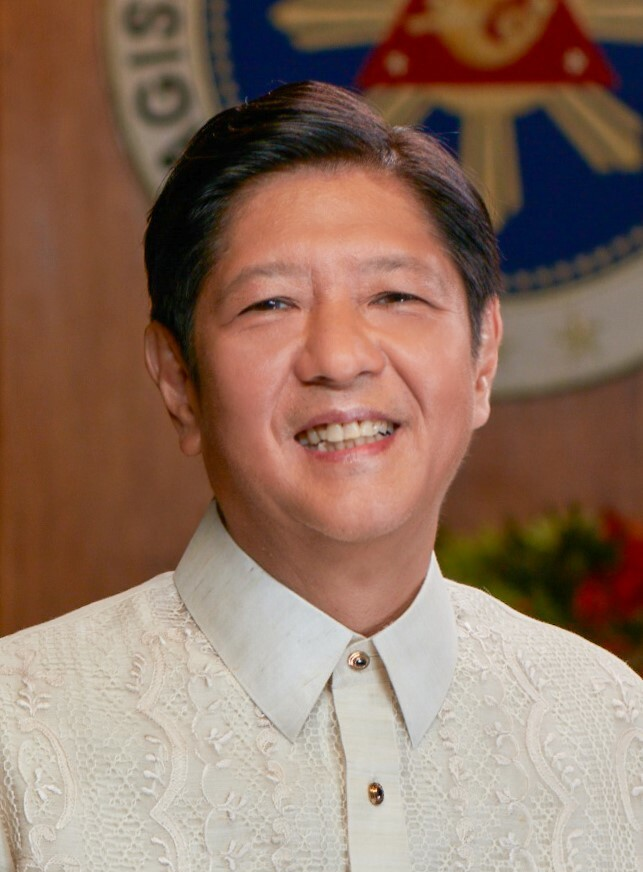

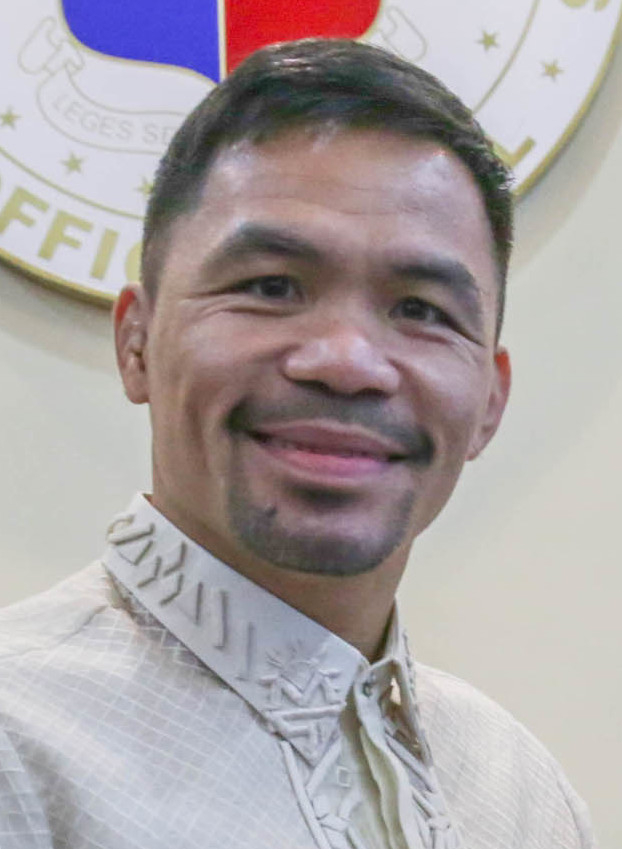
Candidate	Bongbong Marcos	Manny Pacquiao
Party	PFP	PROMDI
Alliance	Uniteam	MP3
Running mate	Sara Duterte	Lito Atienza
popular vote	168,271	85,414
Percentage	53.39%	27.10%
President before election
Rodrigo Duterte
PDP–Laban
Elected President
Bongbong Marcos
PFP
- 2022 Philippine vice presidential election in Zamboanga Sibugay
- May 9, 2022

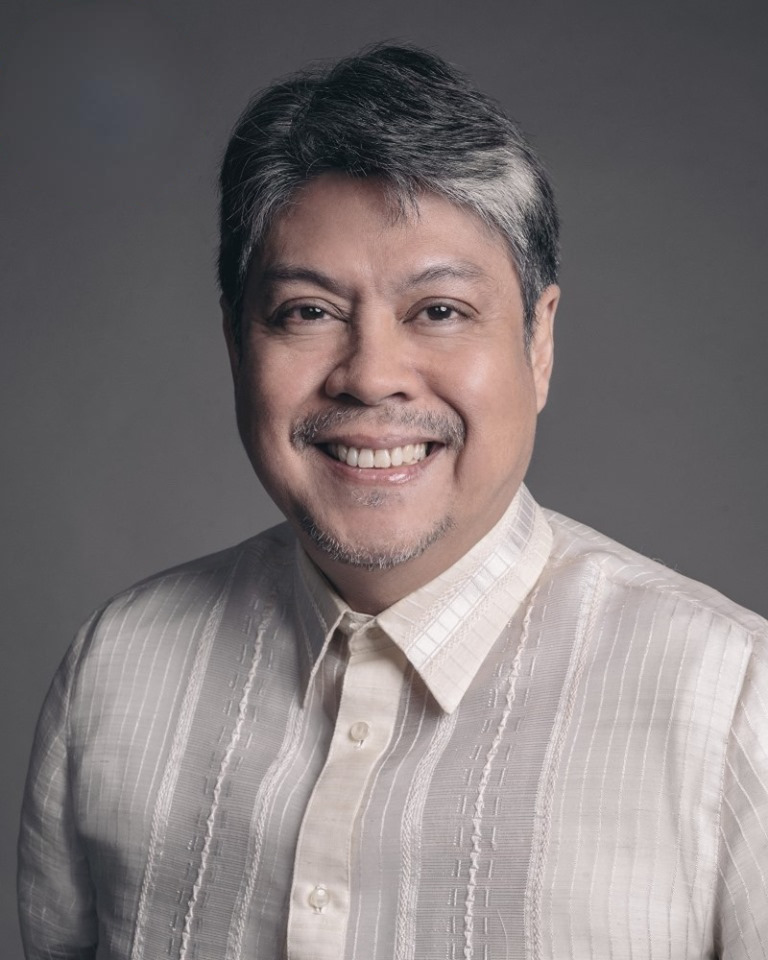
Candidate	Sara Duterte	Kiko Pangilinan
Party	Lakas	Liberal
Alliance	Uniteam	TRoPa
popular vote	215,377	35,119
Percentage	73.34%	11.95%
Vice President before election
Leni Robredo
Liberal
Elected Vice President
Sara Duterte
Lakas

The 2022 Philippine presidential and vice presidential election in Zamboanga Sibugay were held on Monday, May 9, 2022, as part of the 2022 Philippine general election in which all 81 provinces and 149 cities participated. Voters voted the president and the vice president separately.

Former senator Ferdinand "Bongbong" Marcos Jr. of the Partido Federal ng Pilipinas (UniTeam) won in the province of Zamboanga Sibugay in a landslide against former boxer and senator Emmanuel "Manny" Pacquiao of the Progressive Movement for the Devolution of Initiatives (MP3). Marcos managed to achieve 168,271 votes or 53.39% against Pacquiao's 85,414 votes or 27.10%. Eight other candidates ran for president.

Davao City mayor Sara Duterte of Lakas–CMD (UniTeam) also won the province in a landslide against senator Franics "Kiko" Pangilinan of the Liberal Party (TRoPa) and Senate president Vicente "Tito" Sotto III of the Nationalist People's Coalition (Lacson-Sotto). Duterte achieved 215,377 votes or 73.34% against Pangilinan's 35,119 votes or 11.95% and Sotto's 29,704 votes or 10.11% of the votes. Six other candidates ran for vice president. Duterte achieved more votes than her running mate, Marcos.

Zamboanga Sibugay voted solid for the UniTeam alliance.

== Candidates ==
List of Presidential and Vice Presidential candidates
#	Candidate (For President)	Party	#	Candidate (For Vice President/Running Mate)	Party
1.	Ernesto Abella	Independent		None	None
2.	Leody de Guzman	PLM	2.	Walden Bello	PLM
3.	Isko Moreno	Aksyon	6.	Willie Ong	Aksyon
4.	Norberto Gonzales	PDSP		None	None
5.	Panfilo Lacson	Independent (Note: initially ran under Partido Reporma but switched to being an independent on March 24, 2022 after the party withdrew their support for Lacson and switched to Leni Robredo. Ballots still shown Lacson under Partido Reporma)	9.	Tito Sotto	NPC
6.	Faisal Mangondato	Katipunan	8.	Carlos Serapio	Katipunan
7.	Bongbong Marcos	PFP	4.	Sara Duterte	Lakas
8.	Jose Montemayor Jr.	DPP	3.	Rizalito David	DPP
9.	Manny Pacquiao	PROMDI	1.	Lito Atienza	PROMDI
10.	Leni Robredo	Independent (Note: Member of the Liberal Party but ran as an independent)	7.	Kiko Pangilinan	Liberal
	None	None	5.	Manny SD Lopez	WPP

== Results ==
=== Presidential results ===
2022 Philippine official presidential results in Zamboanga Sibugay (provided by COMELEC)
Candidate	Party	Votes	%
Bongbong Marcos	PFP	168,271	53.39
Manny Pacquiao	PROMDI	85,414	27.10
Leni Robredo	Independent	46,147	14.64
Isko Moreno	Aksyon Demokratiko	8,013	2.54
Panfilo Lacson	Independent	2,219	0.70
Faisal Mangondato	Katipunan	2,005	0.64
Ernesto Abella	Independent	1,147	0.36
Norberto Gonzales	PDSP	746	0.24
Leody de Guzman	PLM	695	0.22
Jose Montemayor Jr.	DPP	495	0.16
Total		315,152	100.00
Valid votes		315,152	92.87
Invalid/blank votes		24,199	7.13
Total votes		339,351	100.00
Registered voters/turnout		422,062	80.40
Source: COMELEC

Popular vote
Marcos	53.39%
Pacquiao	27.10%
Robredo	14.64%
Others	4.87%

=== Vice presidential results ===
2022 Philippine official vice presidential results in Zamboanga Sibugay (provided by COMELEC)
Candidate	Party	Votes	%
Sara Duterte	Lakas-CMD	215,377	73.35
Kiko Pangilinan	Liberal Party	35,119	11.96
Tito Sotto	NPC	29,704	10.12
Willie Ong	Aksyon Demokratiko	4,197	1.43
Lito Atienza	PROMDI	3,827	1.30
Manny SD Lopez	WPP	2,679	0.91
Walden Bello	PLM	1,113	0.38
Carlos Serapio	Katipunan	1,062	0.36
Rizalito David	DPP	563	0.19
Total		293,641	100.00
Valid votes		293,641	86.53
Invalid/blank votes		45,710	13.47
Total votes		339,351	100.00
Registered voters/turnout		422,062	80.40
Source: COMELEC

Popular vote
Duterte	73.35%
Pangilinan	11.96%
Sotto	10.12%
Others	4.57%
