= 2022 Philippine vice presidential election results in Ilocos Norte =

2022 Philippine vice presidential election in Ilocos Norte
May 9, 2022
- Turnout: 87.70% ▲2.39 pp
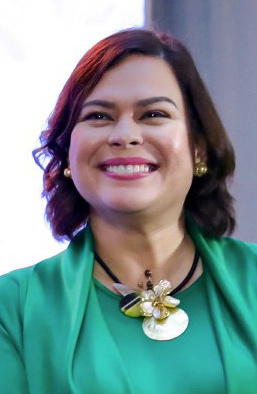

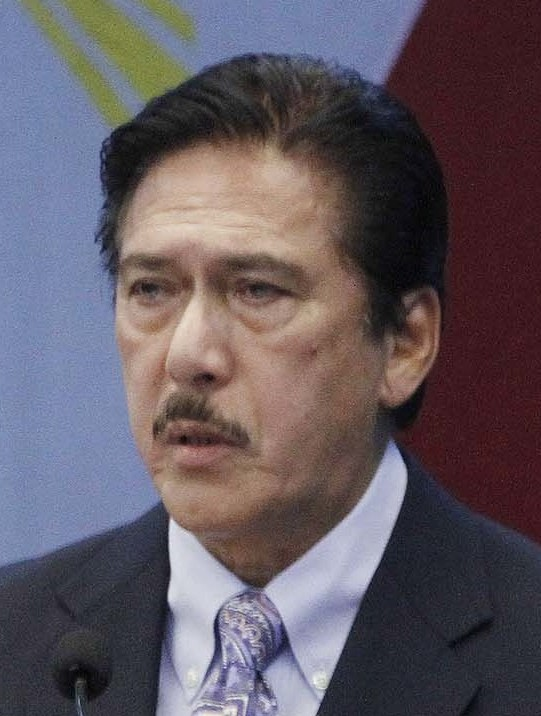
Candidate	Sara Duterte	Tito Sotto
Party	Lakas	NPC
Running mate	Bongbong Marcos	Ping Lacson
Popular vote	342,554	10,303
Percentage	93.80%	2.82%
Duterte
90–100%

In the 2022 Philippine vice-presidential election, Davao City Mayor Sara Duterte won decisively in Ilocos Norte, receiving 342,554 votes, or 93.80% of the total. Senate President Vicente "Tito" Sotto III came in second with 10,303 votes (2.82%), while Senator Francis "Kiko" Pangilinan followed with 7,973 votes, amounting to 2.18%.This result reflects the strong backing for Duterte in the province, which is also the political stronghold of her running mate, Ferdinand "Bongbong" Marcos Jr.

The outcome is reminiscent of the 2016 presidential election, where Sara’s father, President Rodrigo Duterte, won the province with 34% of the vote. The Duterte family's popularity, combined with the enduring influence of the Marcoses in Ilocos Norte, played a significant role in Sara Duterte's overwhelming victory in the 2022 vice-presidential race.

== Results ==
2022 Vice Presidential election in Ilocos Norte
Party	Candidate	Votes	%
Lakas	Sara Duterte	342,554	93.80%
NPC	Tito Sotto	10,303	2.82%
LP	Kiko Pangilinan	7,973	2.18%
Aksyon	Willie Ong	2,708	0.74%
KTPNAN	Carlos Serapio	415	0.11%
PLM	Walden Bello	392	0.11%
PROMDI	Lito Atienza	379	0.10%
WPP	Manny SD Lopez	325	0.09%
DPP	Rizalito David	144	0.04%
Total votes		365,193	100.00%

=== Results by municipality/city ===
Municipality	Duterte		Sotto		Pangilinan		Ong		Various Candidates		Total Votes Cast
Municipality	Votes	%	Votes	%	Votes	%	Votes	%	Votes	%	Total Votes Cast
Adams	1,451	93%	44	3%	34	2%	15	1%	10	1%	1,554
Bacarra	18,461	95%	420	2%	368	2%	133	1%	66	0%	19,448
Badoc	18,088	95%	398	2%	340	2%	108	1%	82	0%	19,016
Bangui	9,024	95%	191	2%	171	2%	78	1%	40	0%	9,504
Banna	10,772	97%	118	1%	112	1%	33	0%	55	0%	11,090
Burgos	6,014	95%	158	3%	87	1%	18	0%	32	1%	6,309
Carasi	1,042	94%	30	3%	22	2%	4	0%	12	1%	1,110
City Of Batac	32,647	94%	804	2%	820	2%	273	1%	124	0%	34,668
City Of Laoag	60,504	90%	3,005	4%	2,761	4%	760	1%	280	0%	67,310
Currimao	8,779	95%	149	2%	168	2%	79	1%	39	0%	9,214
Dingras	21,438	95%	529	2%	283	1%	124	1%	117	1%	22,491
Dumalneg	1,661	96%	16	1%	44	3%	13	1%	2	0%	1,736
Marcos	10,480	94%	357	3%	164	1%	62	1%	79	1%	11,142
Nueva Era	5,026	98%	41	1%	44	1%	15	0%	14	0%	5,140
Pagudpud	15,110	95%	328	2%	257	2%	73	0%	87	1%	15,855
Paoay	14,269	95%	327	2%	284	2%	109	1%	63	0%	15,052
Pasuquin	17,672	94%	524	3%	326	2%	129	1%	88	0%	18,739
Piddig	11,726	92%	583	5%	269	2%	78	1%	121	1%	12,777
Pinili	10,507	97%	173	2%	124	1%	58	1%	23	0%	10,885
San Nicolas	21,106	94%	682	3%	498	2%	208	1%	69	0%	22,563
Sarrat	14,265	93%	596	4%	248	2%	125	1%	78	1%	15,312
Solsona	14,783	96%	299	2%	175	1%	64	0%	73	0%	15,394
Vintar	17,729	94%	531	3%	374	2%	149	1%	101	1%	18,884
Totals	342,554	94%	10,303	3%	7,973	2%	2,708	1%	1,655	0%	365,193
