= 2022 Philippine presidential election in Ilocos Norte =

- May 9, 2022
- Turnout: 87.70% ▲2.39 pp
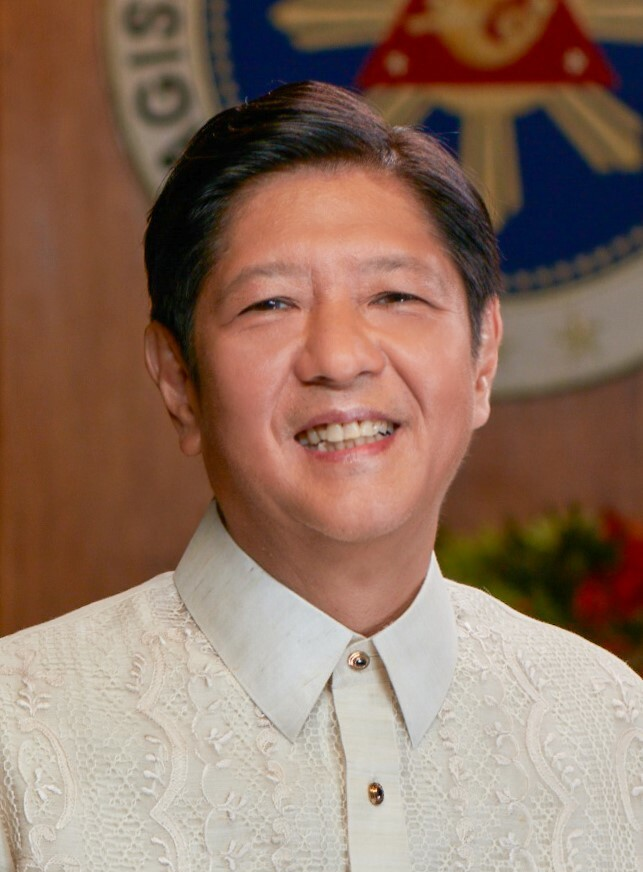

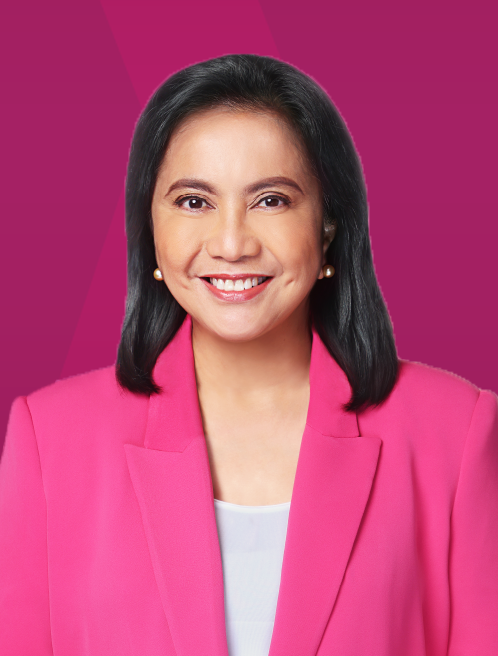
| Candidate | Bongbong Marcos | Leni Robredo |
| Party | PFP | Independent |
| Running mate | Sara Duterte | Kiko Pangilinan |
| Popular vote | 356,221 | 10,043 |
| Percentage | 95.84% | 2.70% |
Marcos
90–100%

Ilocos Norte, known as the bailiwick of former Senator Ferdinand "Bongbong" Marcos Jr., overwhelmingly supported his presidential bid in the 2022 Philippine election. Marcos, who previously served as the province's governor from 1998 to 2007, secured 356,221 votes, translating to 95.84%—the highest vote percentage of any presidential candidate in all provinces. His closest rival, Vice President Maria Leonor "Leni" Robredo, garnered only 10,043 votes, representing a mere 2.70%.

The 2022 election results in Ilocos Norte closely mirrored the outcome of the 2016 vice-presidential race, where Marcos received an even more commanding 97% of the vote, with Robredo securing just 1%. As a stronghold of the Marcos family, Ilocos Norte played a pivotal role in the sweeping victory Marcos achieved nationwide in 2022, reinforcing the loyalty and support he commands in his home province.

== Results ==
2022 Presidential election in Ilocos Norte
| Party | Candidate | Votes | % |
|---|---|---|---|
| PFP | Bongbong Marcos | 356,221 | 95.84% |
| Independent | Leni Robredo | 10,043 | 2.70% |
| PDR | Ping Lacson | 1,928 | 0.52% |
| Aksyon | Isko Moreno | 1,426 | 0.38% |
| PROMDI | Manny Pacquiao | 1,046 | 0.28% |
| Independent | Ernie Abella | 280 | 0.08% |
| PLM | Leody de Guzman | 200 | 0.05% |
| DPP | Jose Montemayor Jr. | 193 | 0.05% |
| PDSP | Norberto Gonzales | 192 | 0.05% |
| KTPNAN | Faisal Mangondato | 164 | 0.04% |
| Total votes | | 371,693 | 100.00% |

=== Result by municipality/city ===
| Municipality | Marcos | | Robredo | | Lacson | | Moreno | | Pacquiao | | Various Candidates | | Total Votes Cast |
| Municipality | Votes | % | Votes | % | Votes | % | Votes | % | Votes | % | Votes | % | Total Votes Cast |
|---|---|---|---|---|---|---|---|---|---|---|---|---|---|
| Adams | 1,545 | 94% | 53 | 3% | 8 | 0% | 6 | 0% | 18 | 1% | 5 | 0% | 1,635 |
| Bacarra | 19,068 | 97% | 438 | 2% | 65 | 0% | 72 | 0% | 9 | 0% | 42 | 0% | 19,694 |
| Badoc | 18,777 | 97% | 376 | 2% | 67 | 0% | 49 | 0% | 23 | 0% | 44 | 0% | 19,336 |
| Bangui | 9,420 | 96% | 208 | 2% | 39 | 0% | 30 | 0% | 54 | 1% | 20 | 0% | 9,771 |
| Banna | 11,048 | 98% | 121 | 1% | 16 | 0% | 10 | 0% | 9 | 0% | 25 | 0% | 11,229 |
| Burgos | 6,297 | 97% | 107 | 2% | 22 | 0% | 11 | 0% | 13 | 0% | 13 | 0% | 6,463 |
| Carasi | 1,107 | 97% | 23 | 2% | 3 | 0% | 2 | 0% | 3 | 0% | 6 | 1% | 1,144 |
| City Of Batac | 33,990 | 96% | 925 | 3% | 125 | 0% | 87 | 0% | 43 | 0% | 77 | 0% | 35,247 |
| City Of Laoag | 62,696 | 92% | 3,820 | 6% | 789 | 1% | 493 | 1% | 231 | 0% | 216 | 0% | 68,245 |
| Currimao | 9,123 | 97% | 194 | 2% | 33 | 0% | 20 | 0% | 10 | 0% | 21 | 0% | 9,401 |
| Dingras | 22,334 | 98% | 298 | 1% | 44 | 0% | 72 | 0% | 32 | 0% | 62 | 0% | 22,842 |
| Dumalneg | 1,673 | 94% | 72 | 4% | 9 | 1% | 10 | 1% | 7 | 0% | 10 | 1% | 1,781 |
| Marcos | 11,126 | 97% | 180 | 2% | 29 | 0% | 34 | 0% | 21 | 0% | 33 | 0% | 11,423 |
| Nueva Era | 5,088 | 99% | 57 | 1% | 3 | 0% | 1 | 0% | 2 | 0% | 4 | 0% | 5,155 |
| Pagudpud | 15,723 | 97% | 285 | 2% | 52 | 0% | 48 | 0% | 70 | 0% | 54 | 0% | 16,232 |
| Paoay | 14,874 | 96% | 359 | 2% | 66 | 0% | 67 | 0% | 16 | 0% | 33 | 0% | 15,415 |
| Pasuquin | 18,302 | 96% | 411 | 2% | 121 | 1% | 95 | 0% | 35 | 0% | 69 | 0% | 19,033 |
| Piddig | 12,317 | 94% | 314 | 2% | 59 | 0% | 47 | 0% | 292 | 2% | 95 | 1% | 13,124 |
| Pinili | 10,876 | 98% | 148 | 1% | 38 | 0% | 29 | 0% | 7 | 0% | 16 | 0% | 11,114 |
| San Nicolas | 21,933 | 96% | 665 | 3% | 129 | 1% | 89 | 0% | 39 | 0% | 39 | 0% | 22,894 |
| Sarrat | 15,099 | 97% | 303 | 2% | 78 | 0% | 52 | 0% | 33 | 0% | 39 | 0% | 15,604 |
| Solsona | 15,315 | 98% | 223 | 1% | 44 | 0% | 36 | 0% | 26 | 0% | 58 | 0% | 15,702 |
| Vintar | 18,490 | 96% | 463 | 2% | 89 | 0% | 66 | 0% | 53 | 0% | 48 | 0% | 19,209 |
| Totals | 356,221 | 96% | 10,043 | 3% | 1,928 | 1% | 1,426 | 0% | 1,046 | 0% | 1,029 | 0% | 371,693 |
