= 2016 Autonomous Region in Muslim Mindanao general election =

Autonomous region election in the Philippines

2016 ARMM general election
- May 9, 2016
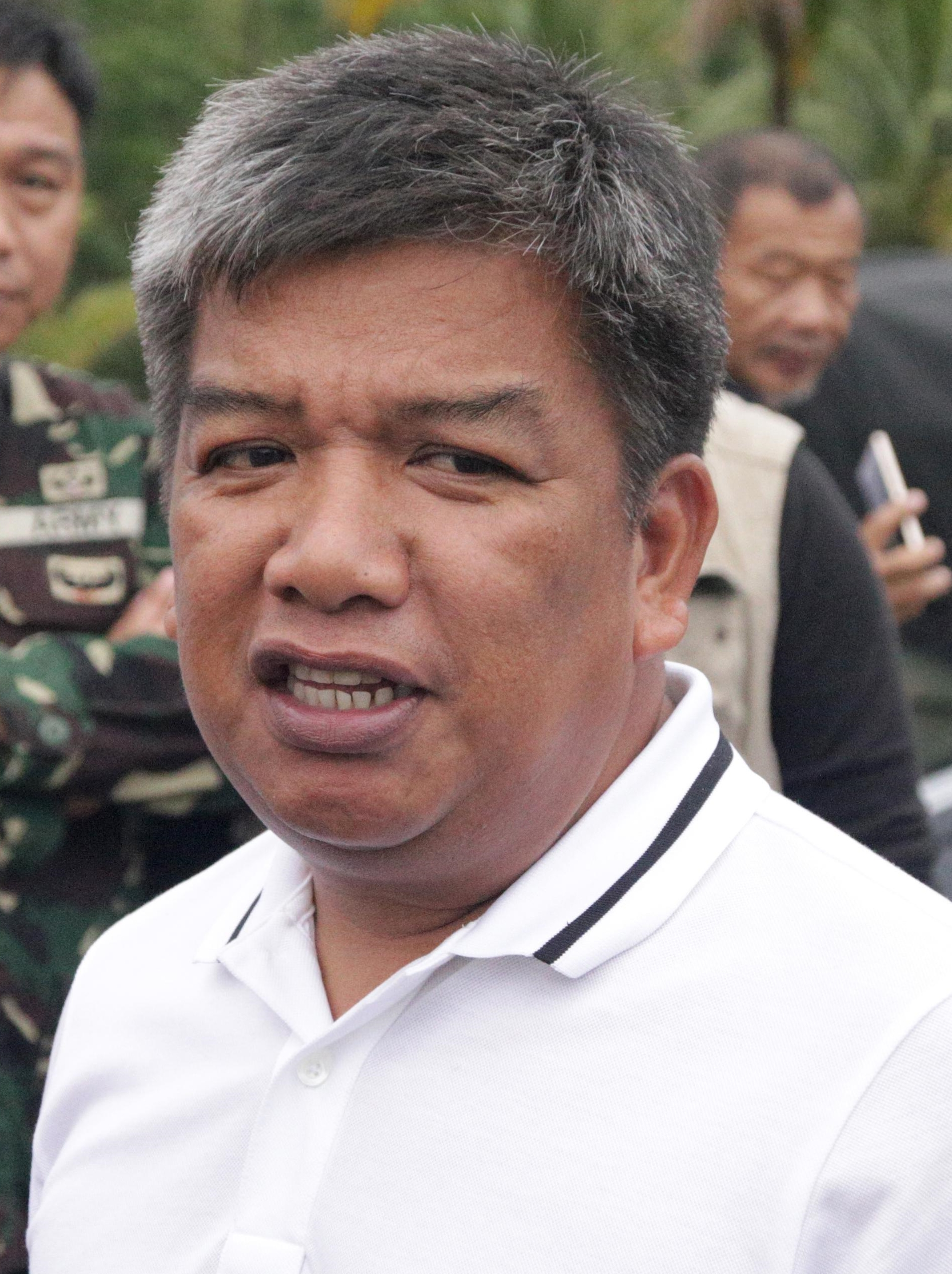

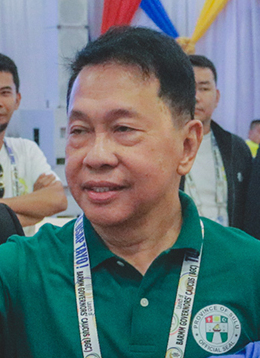
Nominee	Mujiv Hataman	Sakur Tan
Party	Liberal	Independent
Running mate	Haroun Al-Rashid Lucman	Haron Bandila
Popular vote	875,200	341,280
Percentage	70.16%	27.36%
- Election results. Party with the highest number of votes of the gubernatorial election in each province is shaded its party's color. For assembly results, each circle represents a seat, shaded by the party that won that seat.
Regional Governor before election
Mujiv Hataman
Liberal
Elected Regional Governor
Mujiv Hataman
Liberal

The 2016 general election in the Autonomous Region in Muslim Mindanao (ARMM) was held on May 9, 2016.

This was the second ARMM election that was synchronized with the general election in the Philippines and the last general election in the ARMM.

The governor and vice governor are elected via first past the post system; they are elected separately and may come from different parties. Elections for the regional assembly are via plurality-at-large voting, with each assembly district (coextensive with legislative districts as used in House of Representatives elections) having three seats. A voter can vote for up to the three candidates, with the candidates with the three highest total number of votes being elected.

This was the last general election in the ARMM. The elections in May 2019 were superseded by the approval of the new autonomous region, the Bangsamoro, via a plebiscite in January and February 2019. ARMM itself dissolved on February 26, 2019 when the Bangsamoro Transition Authority took over from the ARMM. The winners of the 2016 election were given the option to opt in to join the Bangsamoro Transition Authority Parliament until their terms expired on June 30. All but one, Regional Governor Mujiv Hataman, opted in.

The first general election in the Bangsamoro shall be on September 2026, or over a decade after the last ARMM elections. Originally set for 2022 along with the 2022 Philippine general election, it was postponed due to the COVID-19 pandemic in Bangsamoro, and due to delays in passing a regional electoral code in 2019 to May 2025, along with the 2025 Philippine general election. In 2024, the Supreme Court declared Sulu's inclusion in the region as unconstitutional; the Bangsamoro Parliament passed a resolution urging Congress to postpone the election further. Congress passed another law postponing to October 2025. Less than two weeks before the election, the Supreme Court ruled that the regional electoral code as unconstitutional. The Commission on Elections then postponed the election to March 2026, then again to September 2026, due to issues with passing a new electoral code.

== Results ==
=== Regional governor ===
2016 ARMM gubernatorial election
Party	Candidate	Votes	%
Liberal	Mujiv Hataman	875,200	70.16%
Independent	Sakur Tan	341,280	27.36%
Independent	Faisal Mangondato	26,468	2.12%
Independent	Kharis Pamaloy	4,472	0.36%
Valid ballots		1,247,420	90.03%
Margin of victory		533,920	42.80%
Invalid or blank votes		138,090	9.97%
Total votes		1,385,510	100.00%
Liberal hold			

=== Regional vice governor ===
2016 ARMM vice-gubernatorial election
Party	Candidate	Votes	%
Liberal	Haroun Al-Rashid Lucman	716,555	67.98%
Independent	Binladen Sharief	191,177	18.14%
Independent	Haron Bandila	127,542	12.10%
Independent	Mosib Salipada	18,851	1.79%
Valid ballots		1,054,125	76.08%
Margin of victory		525,378	49.84%
Invalid or blank votes		331,385	23.92%
Total votes		1,385,510	100.00%
Liberal hold			

=== Regional assembly ===
==== Summary ====
Party	Votes	%	Seats
Liberal Party	1,110,166	35.54	10
United Nationalist Alliance	215,598	6.90	1
National Unity Party	173,216	5.55	2
Aksyon Demokratiko	58,257	1.87	1
Nationalist People's Coalition	32,766	1.05	0
Laban ng Demokratikong Pilipino	19,523	0.63	0
PDP–Laban	3,625	0.12	0
Independents	1,510,463	48.36	10
Total	3,123,614	100.00	24

==== Basilan (Lone District) ====
2016 Basilan Lone District Regional Assemblymen election
Party	Candidate	Votes	%
Independent	Haber Asarul	97,255	28.37%
Independent	Abdelmajid Habib Hussin	88,522	25.82%
Independent	Ronie Hantian	74,661	21.78%
Independent	Juni Rasheid Ilimin	41,802	12.19%
Independent	Ahmad Ali Ismael	37,758	11.01%
NPC	Mon Pacio	2,807	0.82%
Total votes		342,805	100.00%

==== Lanao del Sur ====
===== 1st District =====
2016 Lanao del Sur 1st District Regional Assemblymen election
Party	Candidate	Votes	%
Independent	Odin Sumagayan	142,265	24.11%
Independent	Ziaur-Rahman Adiong	132,472	22.45%
Independent	Fiat Macarambon	129,730	21.98%
Independent	Janimah Pandi	118,848	20.14%
UNA	Manggay Guro, Jr.	49,720	8.43%
Independent	Pangalian Casan	6,463	1.10%
Independent	Metalicop Unda	5,268	0.89%
Independent	Yusairah Monaoray Ampatua	2,720	0.46%
Independent	Vikki Bangcola	1,365	0.23%
Independent	Jalila Pacatowa	1,270	0.22%
Total votes		590,121	100.00%

===== 2nd District =====
2016 Lanao del Sur 2nd District Regional Assemblymen election
Party	Candidate	Votes	%
Aksyon	Froxy Macarambon	58,257	14.49%
Liberal	Alex Menor	52,332	13.02%
Independent	Abol Alam Padate	52,285	13.01%
Liberal	Hosni Macapodi	44,590	11.09%
Independent	Macapandi Mindalano	39,346	9.79%
Independent	Arrie Balindong	37,502	9.33%
Independent	Cardawi Macasilang	37,315	9.28%
NPC	Sainoden Balindong	29,959	7.45%
Liberal	Amor Lanto	26,831	6.68%
Independent	Datolah Maclis Balt	8,847	2.20%
UNA	Monaim Guro	7,959	1.98%
Independent	Casan Lucman	2,049	0.51%
Independent	Mohammad Amerol	2,016	0.50%
Independent	Al-Rashid Balt	1,620	0.40%
Independent	Alauya Olama	1,044	0.26%
Total votes		401,952	100.00%

==== Maguindanao ====
===== 1st District =====
2016 Maguindanao 1st District Regional Assemblymen election
Party	Candidate	Votes	%
Liberal	Cahar Ibay	149,932	32.48%
Liberal	Roonie Sinsuat	117,866	25.54%
Liberal	Harold Tomawis	116,118	25.16%
Independent	Jackson Bandila	39,098	8.47%
UNA	Solomon Sr. Baraguir	38,562	8.35%
Total votes		461,576	100.00%

===== 2nd District =====
2016 Maguindanao 2nd District Regional Assemblymen election
Party	Candidate	Votes	%
Liberal	Khadafeh Mangudadatu	101,017	23.56%
UNA	Sidik Amiril	60,821	14.18%
Liberal	Pearl Joy Piang	59,905	13.97%
UNA	Datu Midpantao Midtimbang	58,536	13.65%
Liberal	Sammy Nandang	52,263	12.19%
Independent	Ali Sangki	52,038	12.13%
Independent	Udtog Kawit	26,260	6.12%
Independent	Arghanaim Amboludto	8,730	2.04%
Independent	Jashriya Dilangalen	6,518	1.52%
PDP–Laban	Pike Mentang	2,740	0.64%
Total votes		428,828	100.00%

==== Sulu ====
===== 1st District =====
2016 Sulu 1st District Regional Assemblymen election
Party	Candidate	Votes	%
Liberal	Nedra Burahan	96,168	28.37%
Liberal	Rizal Tingkahan, Jr.	95,306	28.12%
Liberal	Hanibal Tulawie	84,223	24.85%
Independent	Al-Michele Hayudini	63,260	18.66%
Total votes		338,957	100.00%

===== 2nd District =====
2016 Sulu 2nd District Regional Assemblymen election
Party	Candidate	Votes	%
Independent	Rudjia Anni	44,764	19.84%
Independent	Irene Tillah	40,715	18.05%
Independent	Nashruper Daud	40,410	17.91%
Independent	Al-Sadr Tammang	30,117	13.35%
Independent	Khalil Hajibin	29,784	13.20%
LDP	Mohammad Bhydir Sarapuddin	19,523	8.65%
Independent	Abdulajid Estino	14,347	6.36%
Independent	Jul-Amin Kasim	5,960	2.64%
Total votes		225,620	100.00%

==== Tawi-Tawi (Lone District) ====
2016 Tawi-Tawi Lone District Regional Assemblymen election
Party	Candidate	Votes	%
NUP	Romel Matba	67,488	20.22%
Liberal	Rodolfo Bawasanta	55,858	16.74%
NUP	Nur-Mahadil Ahaja	53,353	15.99%
NUP	Anuar Abubakar	52,375	15.69%
Liberal	Sulay Halipa	50,925	15.26%
Independent	Aquino Sajili	39,413	11.81%
Liberal	Almudzhal Salih	6,832	2.05%
Independent	Dhes Mangona	4,796	1.44%
Independent	Ustadz Hasanul	1,830	0.55%
PDP–Laban	Alexander Sumulong	885	0.27%
Total votes		333,756	100.00%
