= Manny SD Lopez =

Filipino political activist (born 1958)

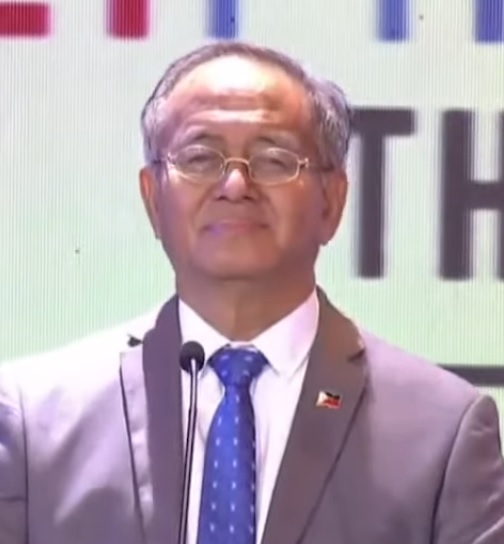
- Lopez in March 2022
- Born: Emmanuel Santo Domingo Lopez; June 30, 1958 (age 67); Moncada, Tarlac, Philippines
- Other name: Manny
- Occupations: Politician, management consultant
- Political party: WPP (2021–present)

Emmanuel "Manny" Santo Domingo Lopez (born June 30, 1958) is a Filipino political activist who advocates direct democracy. He is the convenor of such groups as the anti-Bangsamoro Basic Law group that called itself Christian Peace Alliance and the anti-Benigno Aquino III group called EdlSA 2.22.15 Coalition. Previously he formed the EPIRMA, a group of direct democracy advocates. He ran for vice president under the Labor Party Philippines in the 2022 Philippine elections.

== Personal life ==
Emmanuel Sto. Domingo Lopez who is better known as Manny SD Lopez was born in Moncada, Tarlac to Rizalino Espejo Lopez, an engineer-farmer, and Olivia Pamintuan Sto. Domingo-Lopez, a public school teacher turned entrepreneur. Manny is the youngest among his siblings of five accomplished professionals. He attended primary school in Moncada North Elementary School and later transferred and graduated in Notre Dame of Manila in 1970. He then went to San Beda High School in Mendiola, Manila where he finished his High School in 1975. Ranking in the very top of the NCEE examinations, he enrolled in the University of the Philippines pursuing a degree in Social Science majors in Economics and Political Science. In UP, Manny SD Lopez started as a regular student scaling up to scholarly standard as he joined and became active officer of the prestigious Upsilon Sigma Phi. While in college, he managed his hobby and business of buying, fixing and selling cars. His political awareness and participation grew as he exited UP to pursue graduate studies in the United States.

== Activism ==
=== Christian Peace Alliance ===
Lopez founded the Christian Peace Alliance to oppose the passage of the Philippine Bangsamoro Basic Law (BBL). In a July 2015 forum in Cebu City, Lopez said the BBL is a clear and present danger to the Philippines' national security, interest and welfare, stating that it was patterned after the Federation of Malaysia. The proposed legislation, he said, will lead to the creation of a Bangsamoro Islamic sub-state controlled by the Moro Islamic Liberation Front, allegedly a Malaysian-backed insurgent group that may eventually lead the sub-state to secede and declare independence. "The Malaysian interest in the passage of the BBL is not to help Filipino Muslims; (the law) is designed for the purpose of creating a buffer state that prevents the Philippines from enforcing its legitimate claim on Sabah," Lopez said. At a press conference prior to the forum, however, Lopez stated that the PCA has written its own version of an ideal BBL.

=== EdlSA 2.22.15 Coalition ===
The EdlSA 2.22.15 movement called for Philippine president Benigno Aquino III's and his cabinet's resignation in February 2015 and held a "people's summit" on mismanagement issues that the group claimed Aquino's government was answerable to the people for, the Mamasapano massacre chief among them.

=== EPIRMA ===
Earlier, in late 2013, Lopez, along with other direct democracy advocates, formed the EPIRMA (Empowered People's Initiative and Reform Movement Alliance), a group that initiated moves for a proper people's initiative or bill against an existing pork barrel system in Philippine government.

In 2014, however, Lopez called the Archbishop of Cebu to seek the agglomeration of all groups on the same people's-initiative route that EPIRMA was taking in order to form a united front or coalition. With the agreement of the other organizations, mainly the Cebu Coalition headed by the Catholic Archdiocese of Cebu, a consequent merger was hatched that culminated in the "People's Congress" in Cebu City that launched the People's Initiative Against the Pork Barrel in August of that year.

Meanwhile, at the same time that EPIRMA prepared for its participation in the initiative launch, Lopez had also been criticizing purportedly questionable military purchases under the Aquino administration.

== 2022 vice presidential campaign ==
Lopez was a nominee of the Labor Party Philippines for the 2022 vice presidential election. Lopez is in favor of amending the Omnibus Investment Code of 1987. He preferred on being appointed as secretary of Foreign Affairs or of Trade and Industry if elected as vice president.

== Other advocacies ==
Lopez has also long been an advocate of environmental disaster preparedness.
