= Faisal Mangondato =

Filipino businessman and aspiring politician

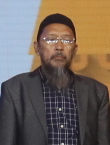
- Mangondato in 2022
- Born: Faisal Montay Mangondato; December 30, 1962 (age 63); Ditsaan-Ramain, Lanao del Sur, Philippines
- Education: Philippine Women's University
- Occupation: Businessman
- Political party: Katipunan ng Kamalayang Kayumanggi

Faisal Montay Mangondato (born December 30, 1962) is a Filipino businessman and aspiring politician who was a candidate for the 2022 Philippine presidential election.

== Early life and education ==
Faisal Montay Mangondato was born on December 30, 1962, in Ditsaan-Ramain, Lanao del Sur. He grew up in Marawi. Mangondato graduated from the Philippine Women's University with a bachelor's degree in medical technology in 1984.

== Business career ==
As a businessman, Mangondato is involving in the importation and exportation of textiles, pearls and diamonds. He is involved in running Kalaw Printext Marketing which is based in Marantao, Lanao del Sur and served as president and chief executive officer of FyMcMan Ltd.

== Political career ==
Mangondato has made several failed bids to get elected to various positions. In the 2016 elections, he ran for governor of the Autonomous Region in Muslim Mindanao. He participated at the 2019 Senate elections as a candidate under the Katipunan ng Kamalayang Kayumanggi (KPP). He failed to win a seat.

Mangondato would run for president in the 2022 elections under KPP once again. His running-mate was Carlos Serapio who was aiming to be his vice president. His platform include the shift to a federal form of government for the Philippines to address what he sees as inefficiency of the delivery of government services in Mindanao despite the formation of the Bangsamoro autonomous region in 2019, the appointment of experienced undersecretaries to the Cabinet, and prioritize the rebuilding of Marawi which was left heavily destroyed after the 2017 siege. His campaign also sought endorsement from incumbent President Rodrigo Duterte banking on his platforms and having no prior "fault" or "bad record" towards his government. Mangondato lost in the elections but managed to secure the plurality of votes in Lanao del Sur, beating frontrunners Bongbong Marcos and Leni Robredo in his home province.

== Personal life ==
Mangondato is Muslim and an ethnic Maranao. His parents died after seeking refuge in Balo-i as a result of the 2017 Siege of Marawi.

== Electoral history ==
Electoral history of Faisal Mangondato
Year	Office	Party	Votes received				Result
Year	Office	Party	Total	%	P.	Swing	Result
2016	Governor of ARMM	IND	26,468	2.12%	3rd	—N/a	Lost
2019	Senator of the Philippines	KPP	1,988,719	4.20%	33rd	—N/a	Lost
2022	President of the Philippines	KPP	301,629	0.56%	6th	—N/a	Lost
