= Carlos Serapio =

Candidate for the 2022 Philippine Vice Presidential Elections

Consultant, Office of the Executive Secretary
- In office 2010–2016
- President: Benigno Aquino III

Consultant, Office of the Presidential Adviser on Political Affairs
- In office 2010–2016
- President: Benigno Aquino III
- Born: Carlos Gelacio Serapio; April 11, 1950 (age 76); Sta. Cruz, Manila, The Philippines
- Other name: Kuya Charlie
- Occupations: Lawyer, politician

Carlos Gelacio Serapio, also known as Kuya Charlie (born April 11, 1950), is a Filipino lawyer who served as a consultant of the Office of the Presidential Adviser on Political Affairs and also as consultant of the Office of the Executive Secretary under President Benigno Aquino III. He was also a candidate in the 2022 Philippine vice presidential election running under Faisal Mangondato with the party Katipunan ng Kamalayang Kayumanggi.

== Early life ==
Serapio was born on April 11, 1950, in the district of Santa Cruz, Manila.

Serapio was detained under martial law in 1978 and 1980 because he was linked to the Legal Department of the Federation of Free Workers.

Serapio also founded a law firm called Serapio and de Castro Law Offices.

== Career ==
Serapio was once the Consultant of the Office of the Executive Secretary and the Consultant of the Office of the Presidential Adviser on Political Affairs under President Benigno Aquino III.

In 2022, Serapio was a candidate in the 2022 vice presidential election under Faisal Mangondato with the Party Katipunan ng Kamalayang Kayumanggi.

== Political positions ==
=== Political dynasties ===
Serapio says that political dynasties will be not tolerated and that a new constitution will "take care" of the political dynasties.

=== Criminal activities ===
Serapio says that he will have the Philippines re-join the International Criminal Court, which president Rodrigo Duterte exited in 2019 due to attempts to investigate his national drug war.
