= Katipunan ng Kamalayang Kayumanggi =

Political party in the Philippines

Katipunan Party Katipunan ng Kamalayang Kayumanggi
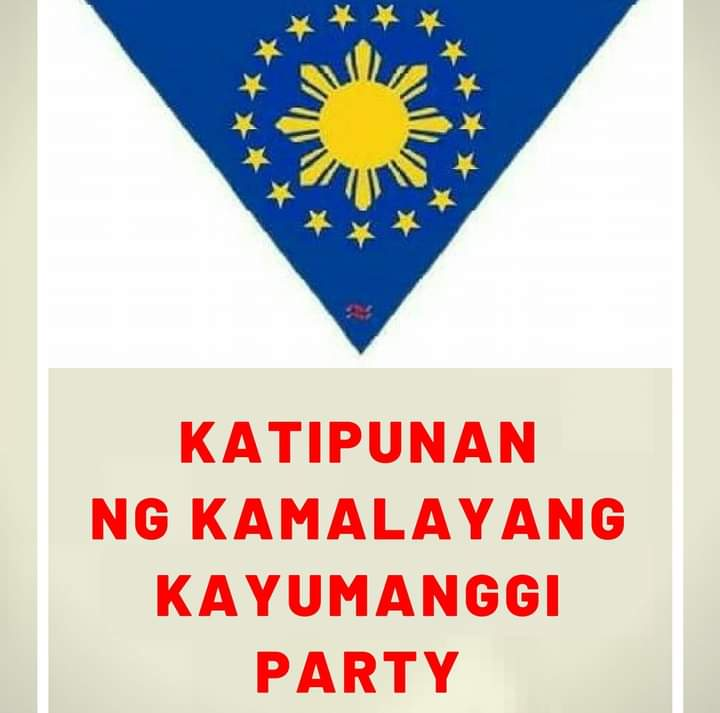
- Abbreviation: KTPNAN
- President: Faisal Mangondato
- Chairperson: Carlos Serapio
- Secretary-General: Villamor Mostrales
- Founded: June 27, 2014; 11 years ago
- Headquarters: 2nd Floor, YDG Building, No. 219 Katipunan Avenue, Brgy. Milagrosa, Project 4, Quezon City
- Ideology: Federalism
- Colors: Blue; Brown
- Senate: 0 / 24
- House of Representatives: 0 / 318
- Provincial Governors: 0 / 82
- Provincial Vice Governors: 0 / 82
- Provincial Board Members: 0 / 840

Website
- katipunanph.org

The Katipunan ng Kamalayang Kayumanggi (KTPNAN), (lit. 'Society of Brown Consciousness') also known as Katipunan Party, is a federalist political party founded in the Philippines by Faisal Mangondato and Carlos Serapio in 2014.

== History ==
For the 2022 elections, the party has nominated Faisal Mangondato for president and Carlos Serapio for vice president.

== Organization and structure ==
=== Party leadership ===
| Position | Name |
|---|---|
| President | Faisal M. Mangondato |
| National Chairman | Carlos G. Serapio |
| Vice president for Visayas | Melvin Legaspi |
| Vice president for Mindanao | Reynaldo P. Pagalan |
| Secretary General | Villamor A. Mostrales |
| Deputy Secretary General | Rodolfo L. 'Banjo' Francisco |
| National Treasurer | Rowena F. Prado |
| National Spokesperson | Hussayin A. Arpa |
| National Finance Officer | David M. Dumangeng |
| National Political Officer | Ernesto R. Arellano |
| National Legal and Discipline Officer | Hazel Faith Hormillosa |
| National Institute for Political Education and Training Officer | Jamal M. Mangondato |
| Information and Communication Officer | Johndel C. Aseo |

== Electoral performance ==
=== Presidential and vice presidential elections ===
| Year | Presidential election | | | Vice presidential election | | |
| Year | Candidate | Vote share | Result | Candidate | Vote share | Result |
|---|---|---|---|---|---|---|
| 2022 | Faisal Mangondato | 0.56% | Bongbong Marcos (PFP) | Carlos Serapio | 0.17% | Sara Duterte (Lakas-CMD) |

=== Legislative elections ===
Congress of the Philippines
| House of Representatives | | | Senate | | | |
| Year | Seats won | Result | Year | Seats won | Ticket | Result |
|---|---|---|---|---|---|---|
| 2019 | Did not participate | PDP-Laban plurality | 2019 | 0 / 12 | Katipunan ng Kamalayang Kayumanggi | Hugpong ng Pagbabago win 9/12 seats |
| 2022 | 0 / 316 | PDP-Laban plurality | 2022 | 0 / 12 | Single party ticket | UniTeam win 6/12 seats |
| 2025 | Did not participate | Lakas plurality | 2025 | 0 / 12 | Single party ticket | Bagong Pilipinas win 6/12 seats |
