= The Life of David Gale =

2003 film by Alan Parker

- Theatrical release poster
- Directed by: Alan Parker
- Written by: Charles Randolph
- Produced by: Alan Parker; Nicolas Cage
- Starring: Kevin Spacey; Kate Winslet; Laura Linney; Gabriel Mann
- Cinematography: Michael Seresin
- Edited by: Gerry Hambling
- Music by: Alex Parker; Jake Parker
- Production companies: Universal Pictures; Intermedia Films; Saturn Films; Dirty Hands
- Distributed by: Universal Pictures
- Release dates: February 21, 2003 (United States); March 13, 2003 (Germany); March 14, 2003 (United Kingdom)
- Running time: 130 minutes
- Countries: United States; Germany; United Kingdom
- Language: English
- Budget: $38 million
- Box office: $38.9 million

The Life of David Gale is a 2003 crime thriller film directed and co-produced by Alan Parker, written by Charles Randolph, co-produced by Nicolas Cage, and starring Kevin Spacey as the title character, a college professor and longtime activist against capital punishment who is sentenced to death for killing a fellow capital punishment opponent; Kate Winslet, Laura Linney, and Gabriel Mann co-star. The film, an international co-production between the United States, Germany and the United Kingdom, was Parker's final film before his retirement, and subsequent death in 2020.

Released in the United States on February 21, 2003, Germany on March 13, 2003, and the United Kingdom on March 14, 2003 by Universal Pictures, it received mostly negative reviews from critics and grossed just $38.9 million against its $38 million budget.

== Plot ==
David Gale is a former professor on death row in Texas. With only a few days until his execution, his lawyer negotiates a half-million-dollar fee to tell his story to Bitsey Bloom, a journalist from a major news network. She has a reputation for keeping secrets and protecting her sources. He tells her his story, revealed through a series of flashbacks.

In 1994, Gale is a successful intellectual and the head of the philosophy department at the fictional University of Austin (not to be confused with the present day and then non-existent University of Austin). He is an active member of DeathWatch, an advocacy group campaigning against capital punishment. At a graduation party, he encounters Berlin, a graduate student who has been expelled from the school. When Gale gets drunk, she seduces him, and they have rough sex. She then falsely accuses Gale of rape. The next day, he loses a televised debate with the Governor of Texas when he is unable to name any innocent people executed during the governor's term. Gale is arrested, but the charge is dropped when Berlin disappears. However, his marriage, career, and reputation are all destroyed. Gale struggles with alcoholism after his wife Sharon takes their son with her to Spain and disallows contact.

Constance Harraway, a fellow DeathWatch activist, is a close friend of Gale who consoles him after his life falls apart. However, Harraway is discovered raped and murdered, suffocated by a plastic bag taped over her head. An autopsy reveals Gale's semen in her body and that she had been forced to swallow the key to the handcuffs, a Securitate torture technique which Gale previously wrote about. The physical evidence at the crime scene points to Gale, who is convicted of rape and murder and is sentenced to death.

In the present, Bloom investigates the case between her visits with Gale. Gale maintains his innocence, claiming he and Harraway had consensual sex the night before her murder. Bloom comes to believe that the apparent evidence against Gale does not add up. She is tailed several times in her car by Dusty Wright, an alleged one-time lover and colleague of Harraway, whom she suspects was the real killer. Wright slips evidence to Bloom that suggests Gale has been framed, implying that the actual murderer videotaped the crime. Bloom pursues this lead until she finds a tape revealing that Harraway, who was suffering from terminal leukemia, had committed an elaborate suicide made to look like murder. Wright is seen on the videotape, acting as her accomplice, implying that they framed Gale as part of a plan to discredit the death penalty by conspiring to execute an innocent person, and subsequently releasing evidence of the actual circumstances.

Once Bloom and her aide find this evidence, only hours remain until Gale's scheduled execution. She tries to give the tape to the authorities in time to stop the execution. She arrives at the Huntsville Unit just as the warden announces that the execution has been carried out. The tape is subsequently released, causing an uproar over the execution of an innocent man. Later, Wright receives the money that Bloom's magazine agreed to pay for the interview and delivers it to Sharon, along with a postcard from Berlin confessing that the rape accusation that derailed Gale's life and career was false. Sharon looks distraught, knowing Gale told the truth and that she effectively stole their child away from him.

Later, a videotape labeled "Off the Record" is delivered to Bloom. This tape shows Harraway's suicide and Gale deliberately leaving his fingerprints on the plastic bag in the process. He then looks at the camera and ends the recording, leaving Bloom stunned with the truth that the couple deliberately sacrificed themselves to discredit capital punishment.

== Cast ==
- Kevin Spacey as David Gale
- Kate Winslet as Bitsey Bloom
- Laura Linney as Constance Harraway
- Gabriel Mann as Zack Stemmons
- Rhona Mitra as Berlin
- Leon Rippy as Braxton Belyeu
- Matt Craven as Dusty Wright
- Jim Beaver as Duke Grover
- Melissa McCarthy as Nico
- Elizabeth Gast as Sharon Gale

== Production ==
The Life of David Gale was shot in multiple places, including several notable locations in Austin, Barcelona, and Huntsville, Texas, such as Sam Houston State University, Ellis Unit, The University of Texas at Austin, and Plaça Reial.

Laura Linney said the scene in the kitchen in which her character is handcuffed naked was one of the roughest scenes she has ever filmed.

== Reception ==
On Rotten Tomatoes The Life of David Gale holds an approval rating of 19% based on 157 reviews, with an average rating of 4.4/10. The critics consensus reads, "Instead of offering a convincing argument against the death penalty, this implausible, convoluted thriller pounds the viewer over the head with its message." At Metacritic the film has a weighted average score of 31 out of 100, based on 36 critics, indicating "generally unfavorable reviews". Audiences polled by CinemaScore gave the film an average grade of "A−" on an A+ (maximum) to F (minimum) scale.

Chicago Sun-Times critic Roger Ebert gave the film a rare zero stars and stated in his review "I am sure the filmmakers believe their film is against the death penalty. I believe it supports it and hopes to discredit the opponents of the penalty as unprincipled fraudsters.… Spacey and Parker are honorable men. Why did they go to Texas and make this silly movie? The last shot made me want to throw something at the screen – maybe Spacey and Parker." Ebert's At the Movies co-host Richard Roeper positively reviewed the film calling it "A dazzling mess."

== Soundtrack ==
The soundtrack (composed by Alex and Jake Parker) has been used in various film trailers, specifically the tracks "The Life of David Gale" and "Almost Martyrs". The score has been used in the trailers for World Trade Center, Munich, In the Valley of Elah, Milk, The Artist and The Iron Lady.

== Perceptions on capital punishment ==
In the Philippines, long-time senator and 2022 presidential aspirant Ping Lacson credited this film in changing his mind on capital punishment. Lacson, who previously served as the nation's chief of police, was a staunch advocate of capital offense for heinous crimes. However, after seeing the film on Netflix, he said that "my eyes were opened…that it is more important to save the life of someone innocent and convicted than to execute someone who is really convicted and proven to have committed a crime." Afterwards, he withdrew his authorship of a bill proposing the death penalty for heinous crimes.

== See also ==
- Beyond a Reasonable Doubt (1956 film)
- Wrongful execution
