= Candidates in the 2016 Philippine presidential election =

This is a list of candidates in the 2016 Philippine presidential and vice presidential elections.

| For President | For Vice President / Running Mate | Winning President | Winning Vice President | Previous | Next |
|---|---|---|---|---|---|
| Jejomar Binay | Gregorio Honasan | Rodrigo Duterte | Leni Robredo | Candidates in the 2010 Philippine presidential election | Candidates in the 2022 Philippine presidential election |
| Miriam Defensor Santiago | Bongbong Marcos | Rodrigo Duterte | Leni Robredo | Candidates in the 2010 Philippine presidential election | Candidates in the 2022 Philippine presidential election |
| Rodrigo Duterte | Alan Peter Cayetano | Rodrigo Duterte | Leni Robredo | Candidates in the 2010 Philippine presidential election | Candidates in the 2022 Philippine presidential election |
| Grace Poe | Francis Escudero | Rodrigo Duterte | Leni Robredo | Candidates in the 2010 Philippine presidential election | Candidates in the 2022 Philippine presidential election |
| Mar Roxas | Leni Robredo | Rodrigo Duterte | Leni Robredo | Candidates in the 2010 Philippine presidential election | Candidates in the 2022 Philippine presidential election |
| N/A | Antonio Trillanes | Rodrigo Duterte | Leni Robredo | Candidates in the 2010 Philippine presidential election | Candidates in the 2022 Philippine presidential election |

== Candidates for President ==
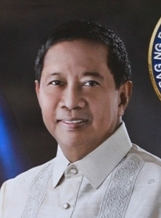
Vice President Jejomar Binay

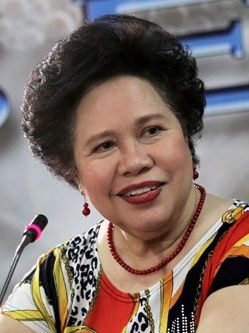
Senator Miriam Defensor Santiago

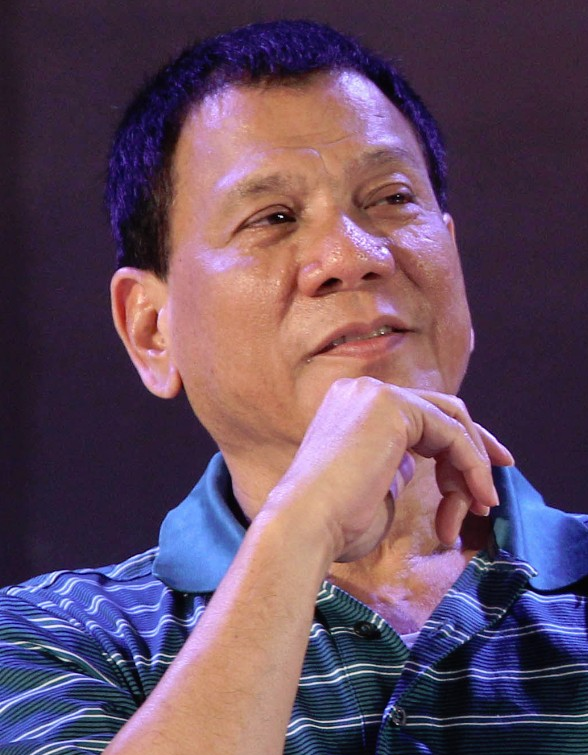
Mayor of Davao City Rodrigo Duterte

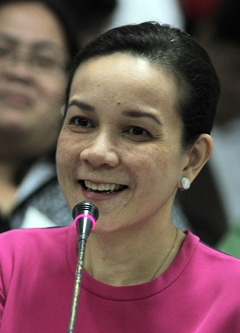
Senator Grace Poe

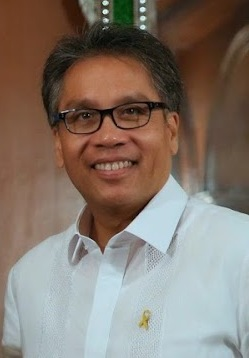
Secretary of the Interior and Local Government Mar Roxas

These are people who submitted candidacies, and were allowed to run by the Commission on Elections and to be included in ballots.

=== Jejomar Binay ===
When he was questioned by the media at the Coconut Palace in September 2011, Vice President Jejomar Binay (UNA) confirmed his plans to run for president.

By May 2014, Binay began his search for a running mate. As his potential running mate Senator Jinggoy Estrada in jail due to his implication in the PDAF scam, Binay's offers were declined by JV Ejercito, Manny Villar (via wife Cynthia Villar), Vilma Santos (via husband Ralph Recto), Mar Roxas, Grace Poe, Rodrigo Duterte and Joseph Estrada. Binay's daughter Abigail, also the Representative from Makati, said that Binay would accept anyone as his running mate except for Antonio Trillanes, and that she prefers Grace Poe, however Sen. Bongbong Marcos was the most preferred by UNA officials to be his running mate. In a 2015 Independence Day (June 12) speech in Iloilo, President Aquino said that he could only offer Binay the conduct of a clean and honest election, but not an outright endorsement.

A few days later, on June 22, Binay resigned from the Aquino cabinet, both as presidential adviser on Overseas Filipino Workers' concerns and as chairman of the Housing and Urban Development Coordinating Council, but did not say why. Two days later, Binay addressed the public from his Coconut Palace offices, branding the current administration as "manhid at palpak" (insensitive and bumbling), but did not mention Aquino by name. He also accused the administration of committing sins against him and the people. A photo of Vice President Jejomar Binay has been circulating in social networking sites, wherein he is seen avoiding the muddy ground of an open field by passing through a makeshift bridge while donning his boy scout uniform.

=== Miriam Defensor Santiago ===
In a press conference on July 2, 2014, Senator Miriam Defensor Santiago (People's Reform Party) revealed she was suffering from Stage 4 lung cancer and she might run as president for the third time if it goes into remission. A Magsaysay Awardee, the Nobel Prize of Asia, and the Iron Lady of Asia, she was widely believed to have won the 1992 Philippine Presidential Elections, but lost after hours of blackout during the counting of votes. She once again run for president in 1998, but lost after black propaganda was used against her campaign. She then run for the Senate in the following elections and won with a landslide victory, becoming the most popular female senator and one of the most respected senators in Philippine history with the highest number of laws and bills authored and passed up to this day.

By November 2014, Santiago, in a tweet, announced that "In the 2016 presidential elections, when I am rid of my lung cancer, I intend to claim the presidency I won in 1992." In a letter to the Senate, Santiago said that more than 90% of the cancer cells have regressed.

Santiago announced her candidacy for president in the launch of her book Stupid is Forever on October 13, 2015. She will run under the People's Reform Party, the same party in which she ran under during her 1992 and 1998 presidential campaigns. Days later, Santiago announced that Senator Bongbong Marcos would be her vice presidential running mate. Her platform stands on the effective and efficient upholding and implementation of national and state-recognized international laws, enhancement of the agriculture industry with a focus on irrigation and farm-to-market roads, enhancing all seaports and airports in the country, creating at least one major government project in all provinces and all regions in the Philippines, building and highlighting the country's diplomatic affairs in the international level while skyrocketing the country's defense capabilities, and eradicating graft and corruption, which she believes to be the cause of poverty and inefficiency in the country.

=== Rodrigo Duterte ===
The 2016 presidential campaign of Rodrigo Duterte, the incumbent mayor of Davao City, was announced on November 21, 2015. Duterte had repeatedly refused to run for several months and turned down other presidential and vice-presidential aspirants' offers to be his running mate, including Jejomar Binay, Miriam Defensor-Santiago and Bongbong Marcos.

In September 2015, Duterte declined Miriam Defensor-Santiago's offer to be her running mate and said that instead of being the running mate to Senator Santiago, he wanted Gilberto Teodoro, Jr. to be Santiago's running mate. In March 2015, Lakas–CMD national president Ferdinand Martin Romualdez said that his party is preparing for the 2016 elections; Danilo Suarez also remarked that they are convincing Teodoro to go out of retirement to run anew. However, Santiago chose Bongbong Marcos as her running mate in October 2015.

Duterte said on a Baguio federalism forum that he'd run for president "if only to save the republic." Duterte cited the need of about 10 to 15 billion pesos as a campaign war chest that's keeping him from running. Days later, Duterte "re-entered" PDP–Laban; he maintained he never left the party, but had to stand in a local party banner in the 2013 local election to ensure victory. PDP–Laban president Aquilino Pimentel III later said that Duterte is among his party's options in nominating for the presidency, noting that the party's position on federalism coincides with Duterte's advocacy.

In August 2015, while at a meeting with military officers, Duterte spoke with Communist Party of the Philippines (CPP) founder Jose Maria Sison. Duterte said that he told Sison that he would run for president if the CPP's armed wing, the New People's Army, abandons its over-40-year insurgency, saying "Armed struggle as a means to achieve change is passée in the modern world we are living in today,". Duterte disclosed that Sison was asking him his plans for 2016, and told him that he didn't have plans yet.

When making hints to the media of his possible intent to run for the presidency he promised to abolish Congress altogether in favor of a parliament, if he ever wins.

=== Grace Poe ===
Grace Poe's surprising first-place finish in the 2013 Senate election as an independent made her a likely contender for the presidency but she dismissed any plans of running in April 2014, saying she was not considering "anything higher at this point."

On President Aquino's state visit to Canada in May 2015, the president disclosed that he had met with Poe prior to the trip, although he didn't say on what the meeting was for. A couple of days later, Poe confirmed that she did meet with Aquino. Poe said that "We discussed his intention to choose a candidate who, first and foremost, has the trust of the nation, and, secondly, has the potential to win in the election, in order to sustain the reforms especially against corruption and the pro-poor programs of the government." Poe expects more meetings with Aquino in June.

On June 2, UNA interim president Toby Tiangco, responding to calls for Jejomar Binay to "come clean" on his corruption allegations, said in a press conference that Poe is not qualified to run either for president or vice president after citing her certificate of candidacy in the 2013 Senate election which stated that she is a resident for six years and six months; adding three years for the 2016 election, nine years and six months or six months short mandated by the constitution. Two days later, before a Senate session, Poe said that she wrote "six years and six months" because it was in April 2006 that her home in the United States was sold. Poe, who had been a resident of the United States for 13 years, returned to the Philippines after her father Fernando Poe, Jr. died in December 2004. She said that she had proof that she had been living in the Philippines since February 2005. She said, that despite being a congressman for Navotas, Tiangco lives elsewhere, and that her decision on whether to run in 2016 is "50%" sure. Poe also observed that the attacks from UNA only began after she signed the Senate Blue Ribbon subcommittee report recommending plunder and graft cases against Binay.

On September 16, at a gathering at the University of the Philippines Diliman in Quezon City, Poe announced her intention to seek the presidency, saying that "No one person or group has a monopoly on a straight path advocacy" of President Aquino, a shot against Aquino's party's nominee Roxas, who is advocating for continuation of the "Daang Matuwid" (straight path) advocacy of Aquino; while also hitting the Administration programs. This resulted in the Palace to question their Daang Matuwid advocacy are contrary to their speeches.

On December 1, the COMELEC's second division had formally disqualified Poe from running as president in the 2016 elections and cancelled her filed Certificate of Candidacy for not failing to meet with citizenship and residency requirements. The division, was voted 3–0, in favor of the petition filed by Atty. Estrella Elamparo to disqualify Poe. The decision stated that Poe had failed to comply with the 10-year residency requiremement, mandatory for a presidential candidate.

On 8 March 2016, the Supreme Court determined that Poe is a natural-born Filipino and she returned to the Philippines from the U.S. in 2004, therefore she meets the 10-year residency requirement to run in the presidential election. On April 9, 2016, the Supreme Court declared their ruling as final and executory and she is qualified to become president.

=== Mar Roxas ===
Senate President Franklin Drilon, when describing the Liberal Party's plans for Interior Secretary Mar Roxas' in 2016, told the media in January 2013 that "so far as the LP is concerned, [and] in so far as I am concerned, we believe that he is best qualified for 2016." Two years later, Drilon told DZIQ AM radio that Roxas had expressed his interest internally within the party. Several Liberal Party stalwarts had by then expressed that Roxas should declare his intentions at that time, with some such as Budget Secretary Florencio Abad suggesting that Roxas may slide down to run for the vice presidency again.

Aquino had a series of meetings between Roxas, Grace Poe and Francis Escudero from prior to Aquino's state visit to Canada in May, until days before his final State of the Nation Address in July, including a July dinner with all three of them at the Bahay Pangarap, Aquino's official residence at the Malacañang Palace complex. While Roxas was seen as Aquino's choice to succeed him, another question was who would be Roxas' running mate, as Poe had earlier said that she'd rather run with Escudero as her running mate.

On July 31, 2015, at an event dubbed as "A Gathering of Friends", Roxas formally accepted the Liberal Party's nomination after he was officially endorsed by President Benigno Aquino III in the presence of their political allies at the Club Filipino, San Juan, where Roxas had announced his decision to withdraw from the 2010 presidential election and give way to Aquino's presidential bid. Aquino also announced his candidacy there on September 9, 2009.

== Candidates for Vice President ==
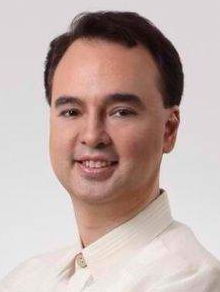
Senator Alan Peter Cayetano

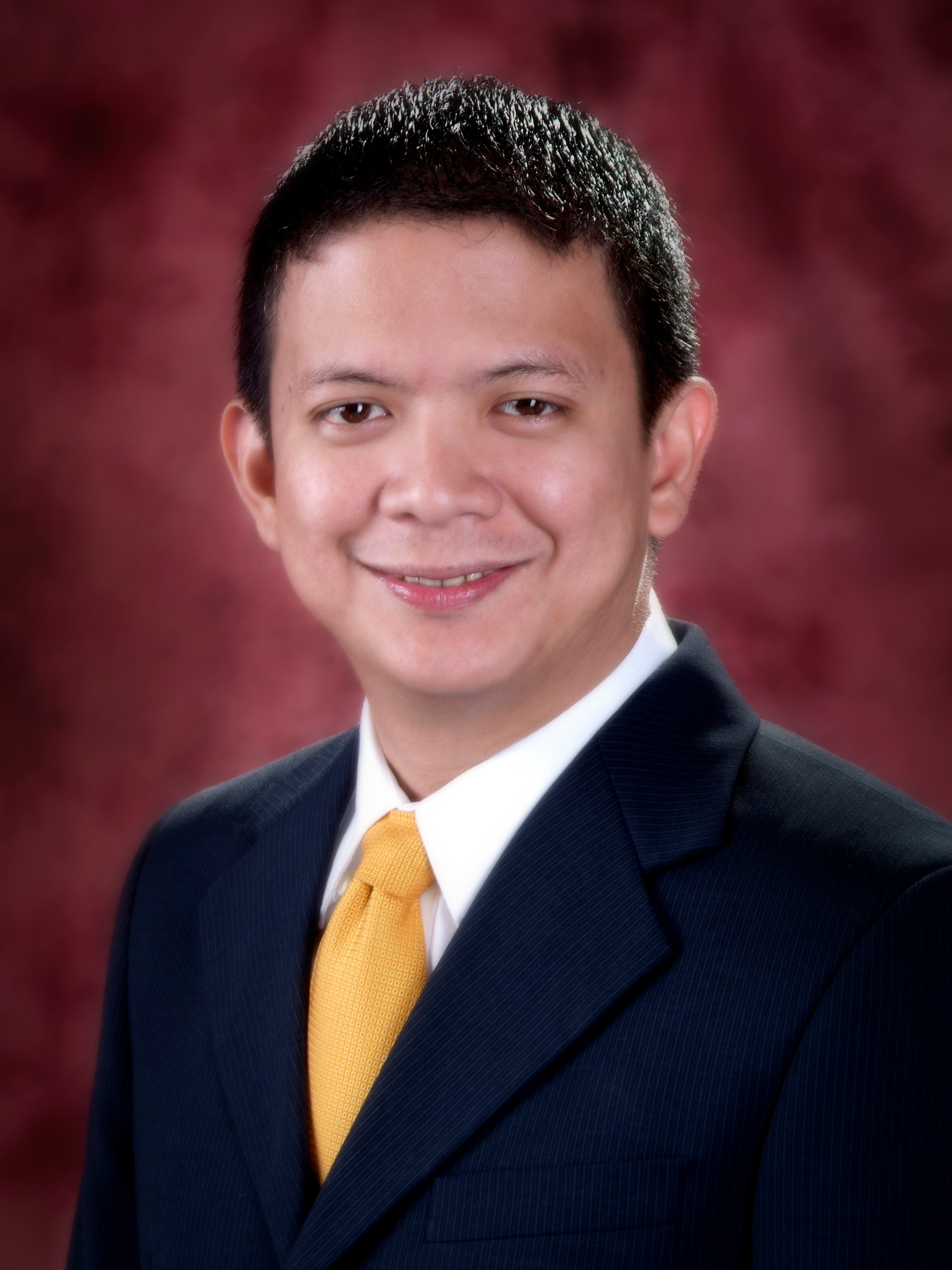
Senator Francis Escudero

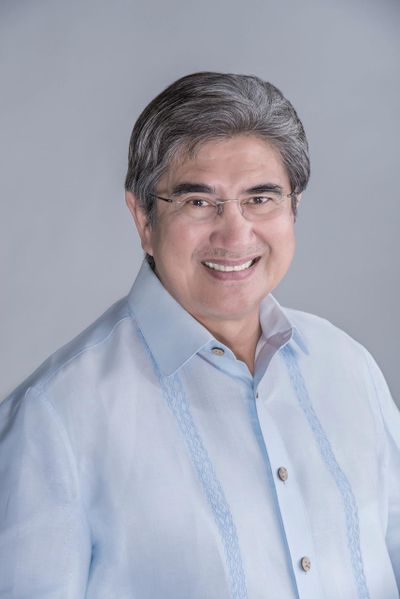
Senator Gregorio Honasan

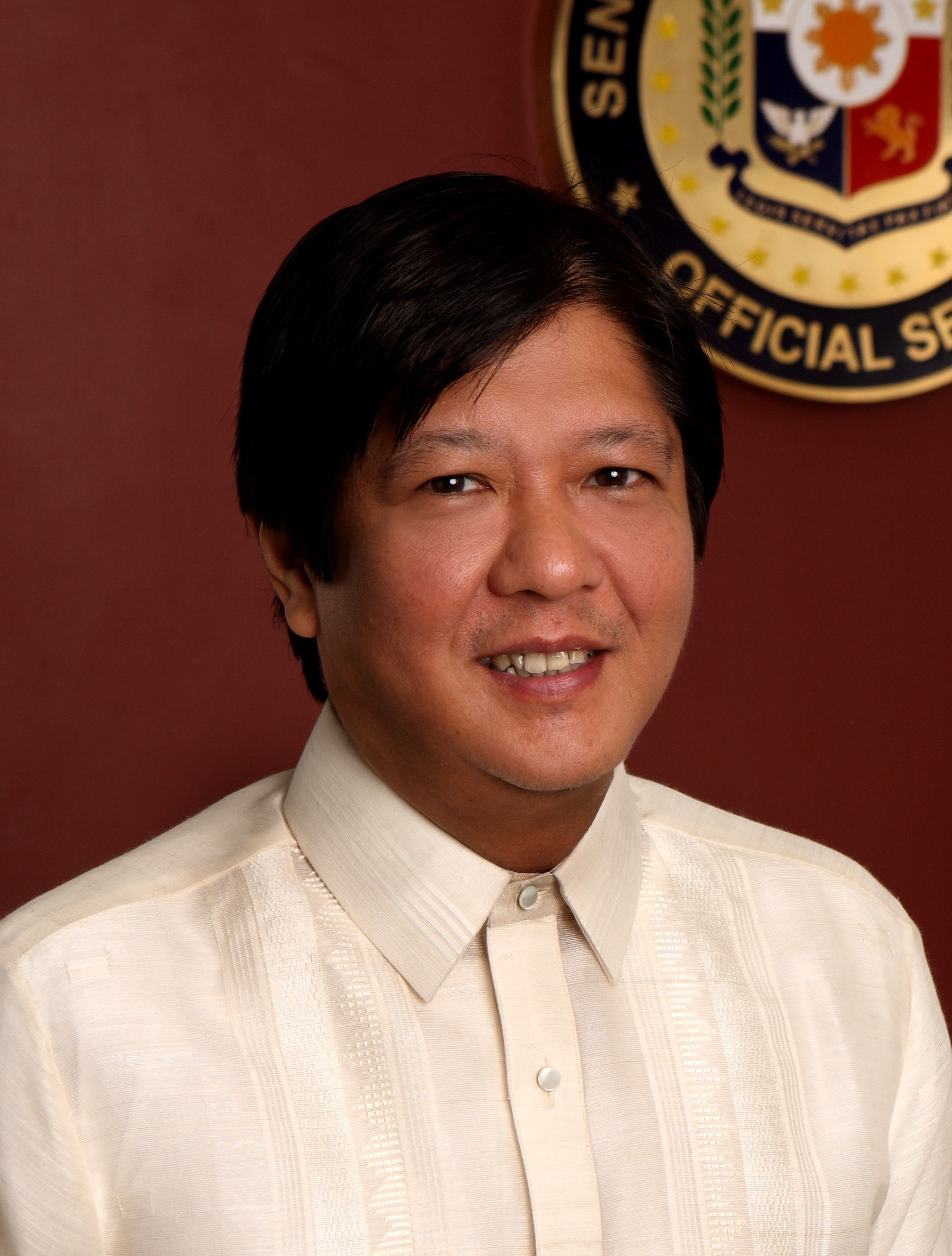
Senator Bongbong Marcos

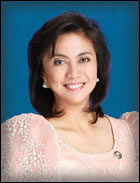
House representative from Camarines Sur's 3rd district Leni Robredo

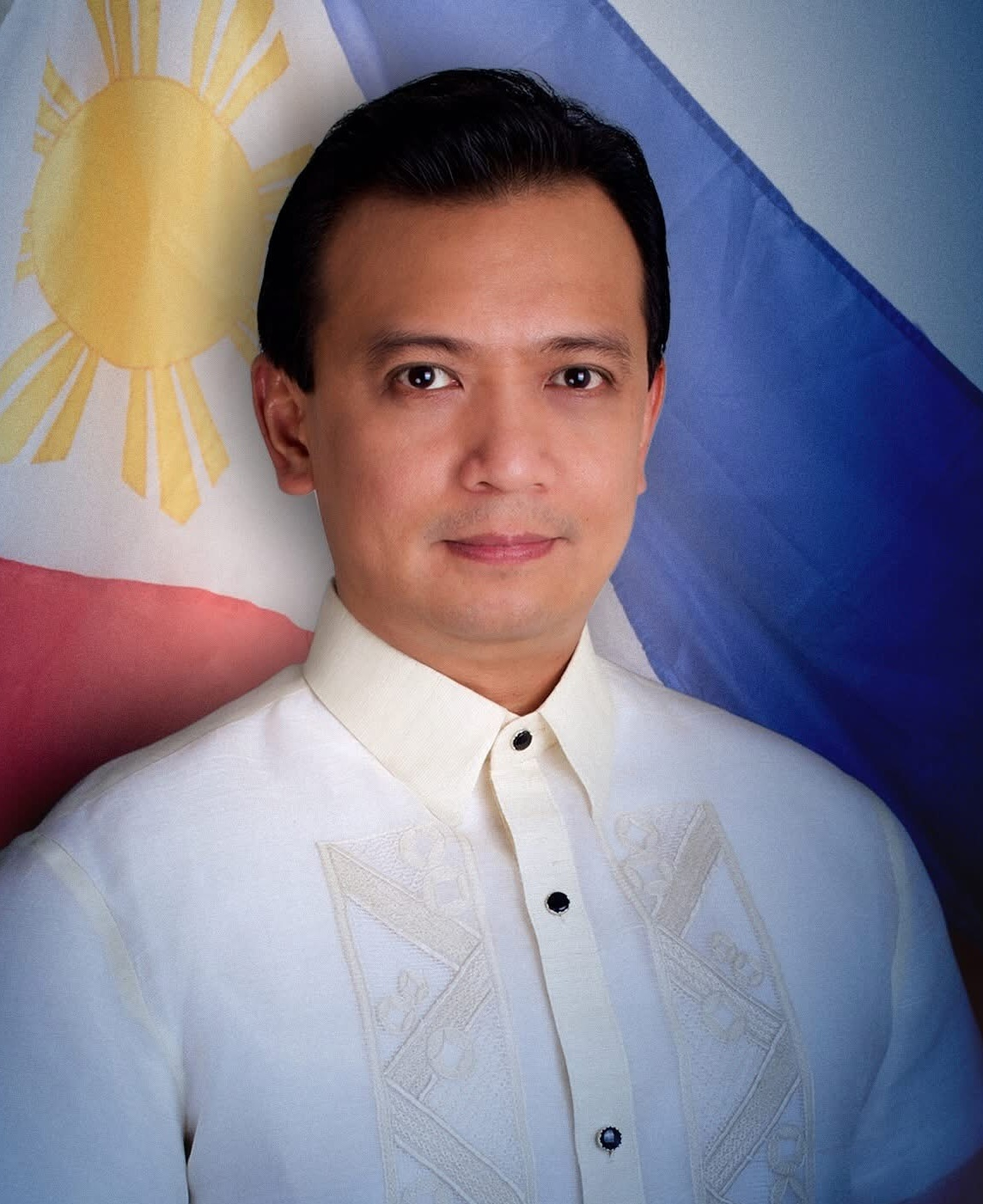
Senator Antonio Trillanes

=== Alan Peter Cayetano ===
In a March 2013 interview on Mornings @ ANC, Alan Peter Cayetano said "I want to be president of this country. I think I can do something great for God and his people." By March 2014, he formed a team to prepare for the campaign. By October 2014, Cayetano said "With the present ratings, who would run?" after a Pulse Asia poll suggests that he is doing poorly. Cayetano clarified though that is not withdrawing from the race.

A month later, Cayetano said that he is not in a rush to make a decision for the 2016 election, after fellow Nacionalista Senator Trillanes revealed that Cayetano was being considered by their party to run; Cayetano pointed out that it seems that it is Binay who is in a hurry to become president. In March 2015, Cayetano said that "If I do run, I'll run for President and not for Vice President," removing him from the vice presidential candidate discussion.

On September 16, Cayetano told reporters that he is giving up his plans to run for the presidency in 2016, but hasn't closed his doors for a vice presidential campaign, preferring either to be the running mate of Mar Roxas or Rodrigo Duterte.

Senator Alan Peter Cayetano, announced that he will seek candidacy for running as vice president. Cayetano, who he is the member of Nacionalista Party, did not mention his presidential running-mate as NP will meet in a few days, for their decision.

=== Francis (Chiz) Escudero ===
In a Rappler interview published in April 2012, Senator Francis Escudero said that "Let me be honest, candid, yet factual about it. I would be very interested in seeking a higher office in 2016 for the simple reason that I'm halfway through my last term." In November 2014, Escudero said that he was still unsure of his plans for 2016, and that he would decide on the issue about a year before the election. By May 2015, Escudero admitted that he had discussed with Poe on their possible tandem for the election. Escudero has not yet decided on whether to run for a higher post or not, although Poe said that they would not run against each other.

On September 17, a day after Poe announced her candidacy for the presidency, at the Club Filipino in San Juan, Escudero announced his vice presidential bid, becoming Poe's running mate.

=== Gregorio Honasan ===
Senator Gregorio Honasan denied there were plans for him to be Jejomar Binay's running mate in September 2015, saying that "I have not considered it." By October 5, Honasan said that a tandem with Binay was possible, saying that ""I will subordinate myself to the decision of the party."

On October 11, Senator Honasan announced that he will be the running mate of Binay. He filed his candidacy in the COMELEC Office a day later.

=== Bongbong Marcos ===
Asked in a November 2012 interview on radio DZBB if he is going to run for president, Bongbong Marcos said he is not closing his doors and "There's a saying, ‘Never say never,’ so maybe." By June 2013, Nacionalista Party president Manny Villar advised his party-mates who were openly talking about their plans for the 2016 election not to talk about it as it was too early.

His mother, Ilocos Norte Representative and former First Lady Imelda Marcos revealed she wanted him to run so he can follow the footsteps and continue the legacy of his father, former President Ferdinand Marcos. She also added that he is fit for the position because "He has an impressive track record and a good vision for the country."

In another radio interview, this time at DZMM AM in March 2015, Marcos said that "we will thoroughly study everything," when asked about people clamoring for him to run. He added that the "default setting" for him in 2016 is to defend his Senate seat. This means that he will surely participate in the 2016 elections, but unclear on what position.

On late August, Marcos said that he is open on becoming Jejomar Binay's running mate, but clarified that he remained undecided on his plans for 2016. Marcos, on an interview at Headstart at the ABS-CBN News Channel, said that "The discussions I have been having with different groups, with other individuals have really centered on higher office", pointing out that he would not run for a second term as senator, but would instead be running either for president or vice president.

In a press statement released to the media on October 5, 2015, Marcos said that he declared his vice presidential bid in 2016, under the Nacionalista Party, although he will support for Davao City Mayor Rodrigo Duterte, if he will run for president. He was also eyeing to be the running mate of Vice President Binay. Few days after, he formally declared his vice presidential bid at the Puerta Real Garden in Intramuros, Manila. The declaration was also attended by Manila Mayor Joseph Estrada and Senator Juan Ponce Enrile. On October 15, two days after he filed his COC, Presidentiable Miriam Defensor-Santiago accepted Marcos to be her running mate.

On February 4, 2016, the Campaign Against the Return of the Marcoses to Malacañang (CARMMA), was launched to oppose the vice presidential candidacy of Marcos. CARMMA was formed by human rights victims and political prisoners during the Martial Law period in the 1970s under the dictatorship of former president and Bongbong's father Ferdinand Marcos

=== Leni Robredo ===
In August 2015, Leni Robredo, representative from Camarines Sur and widow of former Interior and Local Government Secretary Jesse Robredo, remarked that plans of her running for public office in 2016 was "too soon", and that the only thing that would convince her to run was if "I'm indispensable". A week later, Mar Roxas said that he would still have to talk to her, but he recognizes her abilities, and that should be considered.

By September, while attending the 101st anniversary of Cotabato, said that "Running for the country's second highest post was never an option", and that she "never dreamed of becoming a vice president". She instead wanted either Alan Peter Cayetano or Vilma Santos to run for vice president, instead, and that she would rather defend her seat in the House of Representatives, or run for the Senate.

Before the regional cluster meeting of Liberal Party, Sen. Franklin Drilon announced that Robredo will be the party's vice presidential candidate. On an event held in the Club Filipino in San Juan, last October 5, 2015, Robredo accepted the offer to be Mar Roxas' running mate.

=== Antonio Trillanes ===
In the news program Bandila's May 30, 2014 segment where a guest is asked to answer only "yes" or "no," Senator Antonio Trillanes IV was asked if he would run for vice president in 2016 and responded by saying "Let's just say yes, I will run. As for what position, I will abide by the Nacionalista Party."

Almost a year later, Trillanes announced his preference to run as vice president in a weekly forum at the Senate. As with his May 2014 statement, he says that he would submit to the decision of the Nacionalistas, which would meet sometime before the end of April 2015. Amongst the Nacionalista Party's options are fielding its own standard bearer, form a coalition with the Liberals, or adopt an independent candidate.

By August 2015, Trillanes bared his plans of running as an independent vice presidential candidate, saying that the Nacionalistas would not endorse a candidate if more than one of them ran for the vice presidency. Trillanes' own group, Magdalo, his backing his vice presidential bid.

== Withdrawn candidates ==
=== For president ===
==== Mel Mendoza ====
Romel "Mel" Carriedo Mendoza (Pwersa ng Masang Pilipino) works as an assistant project officer and secretary general of Kalipunan ng Masang Pilipino (PMP's affiliate).

Mendoza later officially withdrew his candidacy on February 1, 2016.

==== Roy Señeres ====
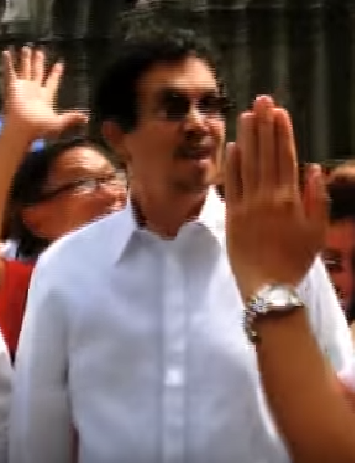
Roy Señeres

OFW Family Club party-list representative Roy Señeres (1947–2016) first revealed his plan to run for the Presidency on October 20, 2014, during the launch of his Respect our Security of Employment (ROSE) movement in Butuan. He reiterated his plan to run for president in the 2016 presidential election a year later during a briefing at the House of Representatives. He planned to run under the Partido ng Manggagawa at Magsasaka party ticket and field a vice-presidential candidate and a 12-man senatorial slate. He formally launched his presidential bid on October 11, 2015, at the Liwasang Bonifacio in Manila.

Señeres' bid was a subject of jokes in both social media and with his fellow congressmen who said that Señeres was not ready and that he had no chance of winning the election.

On November 22, 2015, he launched the National Headquarters of the Partido ng Manggagawa at Magsasaka for his presidential campaign in Las Piñas.

Since declared candidate Rodrigo Duterte of PDP–Laban faced possible legal problems with his own candidacy, Señeres originally opened the possibility that he would allow Rodrigo Duterte as his substitute candidate if Duterte would abide by three conditions, especially being a pro-life advocate. However, Señeres later refused to substitute and slammed Duterte's decision to pursue the presidency, remarking that Duterte should support and endorse him instead.

Citing his health conditions due to his long-standing diabetes, Señeres officially decided to withdraw in the presidential race on February 5, 2016, three days before his death.

== Disallowed candidacy ==
=== For president ===
==== Augusto Syjuco ====
Former Technical Education and Skills Development Authority (TESDA) director-general and Iloilo representative Augusto "Boboy" Syjuco, Jr. announced his presidential bid on October 11, 2015, a day before the filing of the Certificate of Candidacy at the COMELEC offices. He is one of the active oppositionist.

His certificate of candidacy was later cancelled by the COMELEC on December 3 declaring him as a nuisance candidate.

==== Rizalito David ====
Socio-political analyst Rizalito David (Ang Kapatiran Party) formally filed his certificate of candidacy for president on October 12, 2015. He is running under the Ang Kapatiran Party, which has participated in national elections since 2007.

COMELEC declared David a nuisance candidate on December 9 and cancelled his certificate of candidacy.

A defeated senatorial candidate in the 2013 midterm elections, David gained prominence recently when he filed a disqualification case against Senator Grace Poe (also a presidential aspirant) on the grounds of her citizenship.

== Candidate selection ==
=== Lakas–CMD ===
Lakas–CMD has indicated that it would likely nominate Senator Bong Revilla for president, but is also considering 2010 presidential candidate Gilberto Teodoro, Jr., who had retired from politics.

Representative Danilo Suarez's May 2015 meeting with Vice President Binay in Negros Oriental suggested an alliance between Lakas and the United Nationalist Alliance. Suarez said that "We're polarizing towards the UNA. Number one, our chairman emeritus, the former president Gloria Macapagal Arroyo... We're very grateful to the vice president to be the only, the highest elected official who is sympathetic to her."

=== Nacionalista Party ===
On an April 2015 cruise from Manila to Japan, the Nacionalista Party were supposed to decide on their plans for 2016. However, they were not able to form a consensus on what to do. In May, Cynthia Villar said that they are considering adopting Grace Poe as their candidate.

With multiple members angling for the vice presidency, Cynthia Villar said that the party wouldn't impose stand to whom to support for the presidency if two or more members would run for the vice presidency. By September, she said that if Rodrigo Duterte decides to run for the presidency, the Nacionalistas might support him.

Rodrigo Duterte's campaign strategist Lito Banayo revealed in 2022 that Duterte originally planned to ran under the Nacionalista banner, but due to ambition of Antonio Trillanes, Bongbong Marcos, and Alan Peter Cayetano to get Nacionalista's presidential nomination, Duterte joined PDP and the three later seek as Duterte's running mate.

=== Nationalist People's Coalition ===
In June 2015, Senator Tito Sotto of the Nationalist People's Coalition (NPC), of which no party member had indicated a presidential or vice presidential run, said that while his party had not yet determined its candidates, it favors the tandem of Grace Poe, and former party member Francis Escudero, citing their closeness to the party, and the fact that they had "no baggage." Sotto echoed the earlier statement of NPC president Giorgidi Aggabao. Discussions with the NPC had earlier suggested supporting the candidacies of Jejomar Binay or Panfilo Lacson, but Sotto said the Poe–Escudero tandem was more attractive.

Later that month, Aggabao said that "Should it happen that the two parties support different candidates, no coalition has been fractured" as the NPC and the Liberals have no "formal coalition" agreement. By July, Sotto had said that he had no doubt that Poe would run for president, with Escudero as her running mate. He added that the NPC would meet after Aquino's final State of the Nation Address later that month, and many of its members, including him, are just waiting for Poe to publicize her decision.

By August, Aggabao said if Poe decided that she won't run, the party is inclined to support Mar Roxas, "no question about it." At the end of the month, the NPC met Poe and Escudero together, their third meeting, after meeting up with Roxas a few weeks earlier.

=== United Nationalist Alliance ===
In September 2014, Vice President Jejomar Binay announced after a meeting at the Century Park Hotel that the United Nationalist Alliance (UNA), an electoral alliance of the PMP and PDP–Laban, will transform into a full-fledged political party which shall serve as his official vehicle for the 2016 election. The new party shall carry the UNA name and acronym, and sought the approval of the Commission on Elections. In March 2015, the commission approved UNA's accreditation, allowing it serve as Binay's party for 2016. A May 2015 meeting at Quezon between Binay and Representative Danilo Suarez had indicated a possible alliance between UNA and Lakas–CMD.

On July 1, 2015, UNA was launched at the Makati Coliseum, with Binay describing the Aquino administration as "lazy", noting the failures of the government in the Manila Metro Rail Transit System and in the Mamasapano clash, and presented his platform of government. Joseph Estrada was notably absent during the launch.

== Declined candidacy ==
=== For president ===
These are the people who have personally ruled out the idea of running for either president or vice president.

==== Benigno Aquino III ====
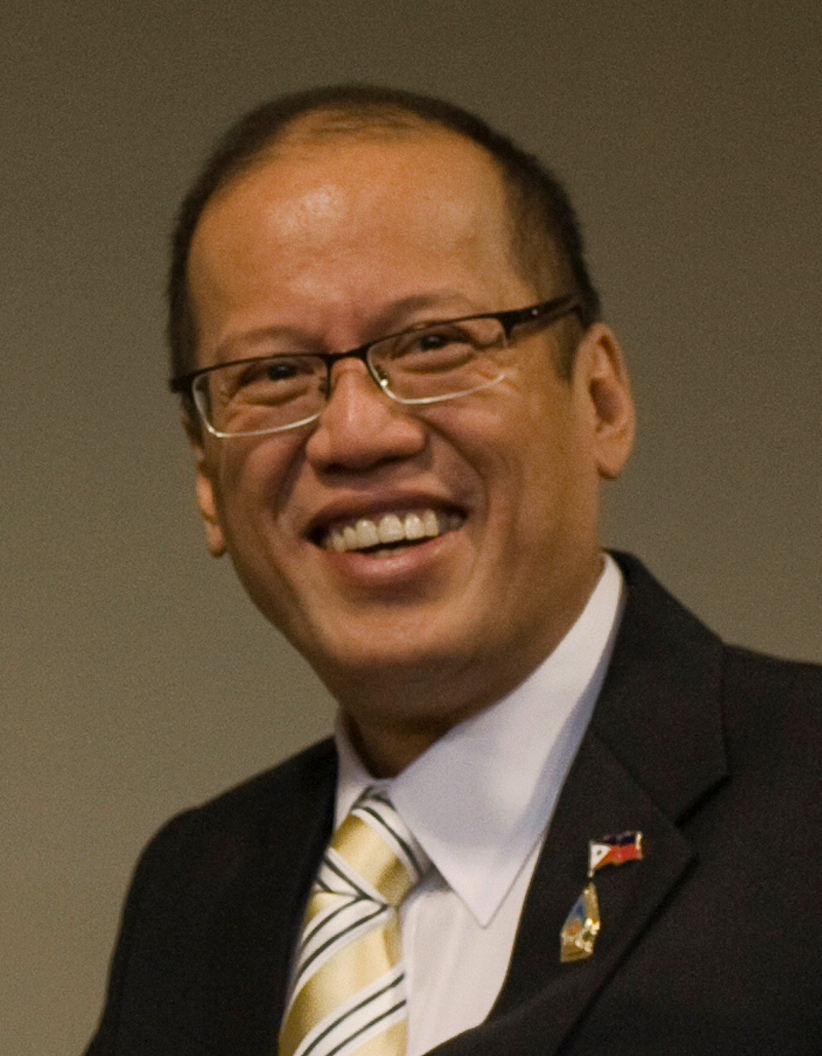
Benigno Aquino III

In October 2013, Aquino ruled out a 2016 reelection campaign, even if the presidential term limit is lifted.

By May 2014, a Facebook page calling support for one more term for Aquino was launched, despite the constitutional prohibition for presidential re-election; Presidential Spokesman Edwin Lacierda said that Aquino "listens to the voice of his bosses" (by bosses, meaning the people). On an August 13, 2014 TV5 interview by Far Eastern University Institute of Law Dean Mel Sta. Maria, Aquino confirmed that he is open to the possibility of running again as president in 2016 if a constitutional amendment lifting the presidential term limit, amongst other things, is successful. The Liberals openly admitted that Aquino is still their preferred candidate in the election, with Roxas only their second choice. Binay, for his part, said that he is "ready" to face anyone in the election.

Several months later, Aquino explicitly ruled out a presidential campaign for him in 2016, instead urging voters to "discern properly" in voting.

==== Kris Aquino ====
On April 2, 2013, Lingayen-Dagupan archbishop emeritus Oscar Cruz has asked presidential sister and actress Kris Aquino's camp to clarify reports of her plans on running for the vice presidency because he heard of her political plans from "credible sources within the administration." Presidential spokesperson Edwin Lacierda denied rumors of her vice presidential candidacy and alluded to Cruz as a "rumormonger".

In a March 2014 edition of her talk show Aquino & Abunda Tonight, she said the possibility of her candidacy has "never been discussed" and added that "it's (the election) not yet my time."

==== JV Ejercito ====
In May 2014, Senator JV Ejercito ruled out becoming the running mate of Vice President Binay and said that running for a higher post in the next elections is "farthest" from his mind. A year later, with the emergence of Grace Poe as a possible presidential candidate, Ejercito said that "I'm in a difficult situation also because both [Poe and Binay] are very close to me."

==== Jinggoy Estrada ====
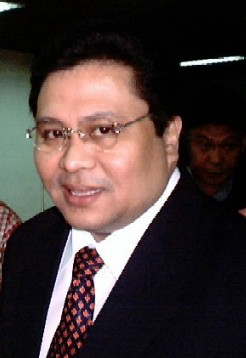
Jinggoy Estrada

In an oath-taking ceremony of Pwersa ng Masang Pilipino members in November 2012, Jinggoy Estrada compared himself to his father, former president and Manila mayor Joseph Estrada. He said his father describes him as a copycat, saying he also became San Juan mayor, senator and even best actor. But after noting that his father's election to the vice presidency, he said "It's up to you what will happen next."

Despite being implicated in the PDAF scam, he believes critics cannot rule him out as a possible vice presidential candidate and still has the machinery and support to run a campaign.

==== Joseph Estrada ====
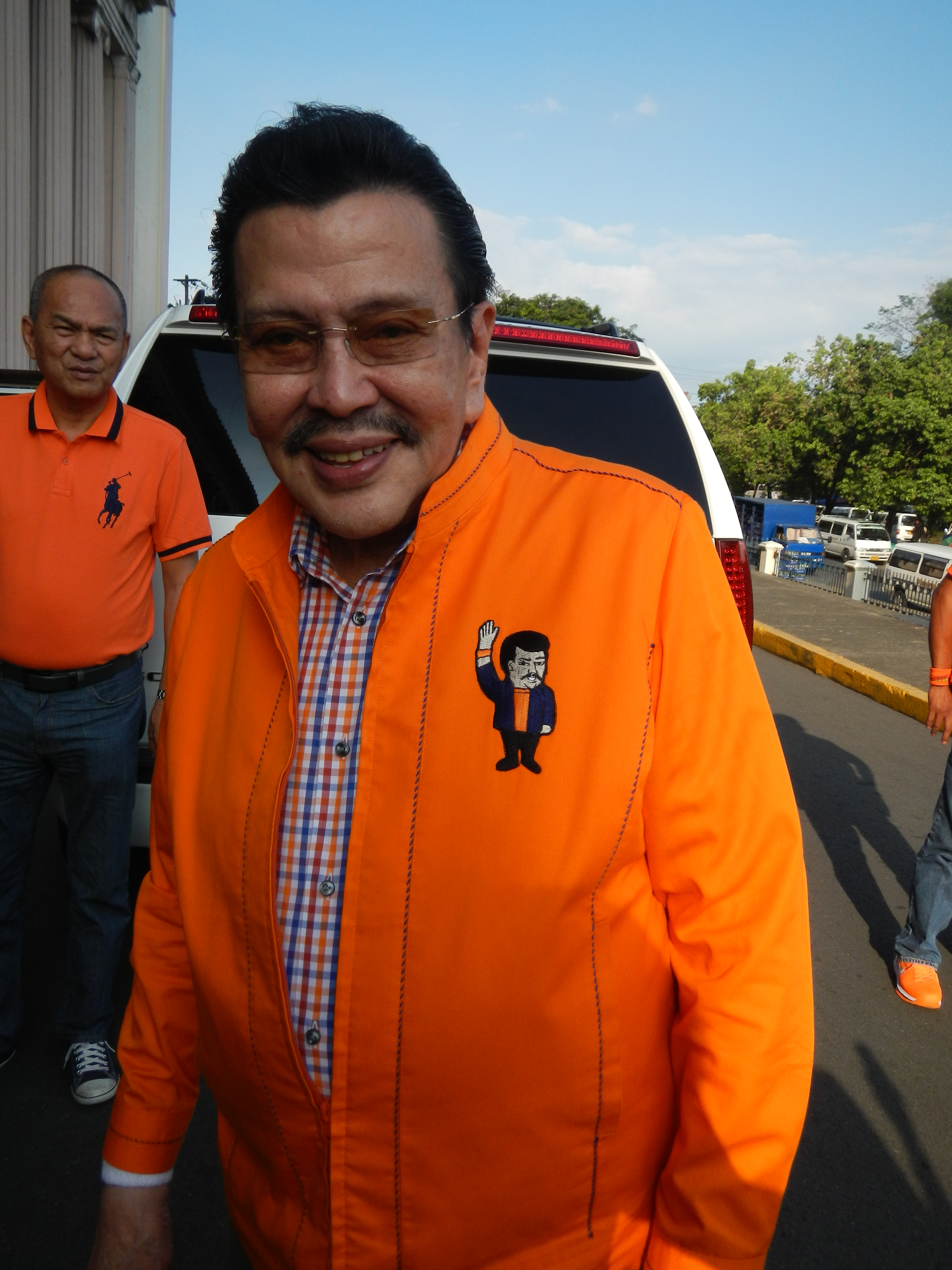
Joseph Estrada

In February 2014, Joseph Estrada said that he has already served as president and that his post as Mayor of Manila will be his "last hurrah." Almost a year later, Estrada said that he would run if both Jejomar Binay and Grace Poe won't run against the administration candidate. If either or both persons run, he said "I will just be a spectator should VP Binay and Grace run against each other in the 2016 presidential elections."

In May 2014, speculations arose that he might replace his son, Senator Jinggoy Estrada, as Binay's running mate due to the former's involvement in the PDAF scam but he quickly dismissed the rumor, saying he will retire from politics in 2016. A year later, in a 24 Oras interview, he said that he is keeping his options open. Estrada, after Binay proposed a Binay–Estrada tandem in June 2015, Estrada said that he has no interest in running for vice president, and intends to defend the Manila mayoralty.

After being conspicuously absent at the launching of UNA, Estrada clarified that he is not a member of UNA, and is instead the head of his own PMP party, which is not in coalition with UNA. However, he said that he will run for president if Binay won't be able to run. By October 2015, Estrada said that he'd run for president if both Binay and Grace Poe were disqualified, to "preserve democracy in the country".

==== Richard J. Gordon ====
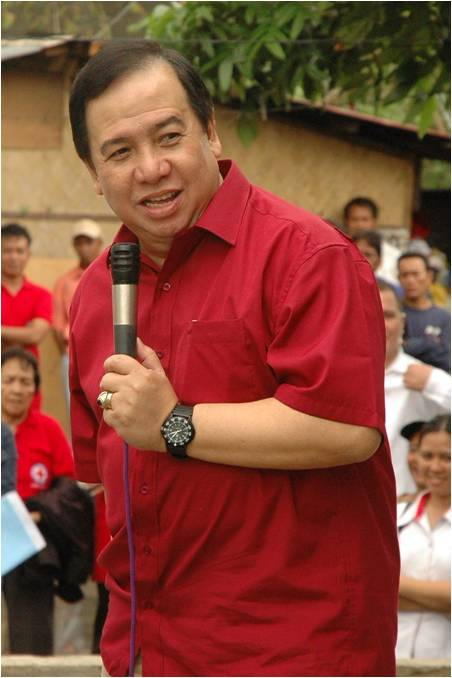
Dick Gordon

Richard J. Gordon launched a presidential bid in 2010 for his own party of Bagumbayan-VNP. Gordon also launched a senatorial bid in 2013 but lost by a close margin to Gringo Honasan for the final Senate seat. Having a clean and strong track record, Gordon was a potential candidate for 2016. Gordon is a former mayor of Olongapo City, former chairman of the Subic Bay Metropolitan Authority, former secretary of the Department of Tourism and currently serves as chairman of the Philippine Red Cross after 45 years of volunteering.

==== Manny Pacquiao ====
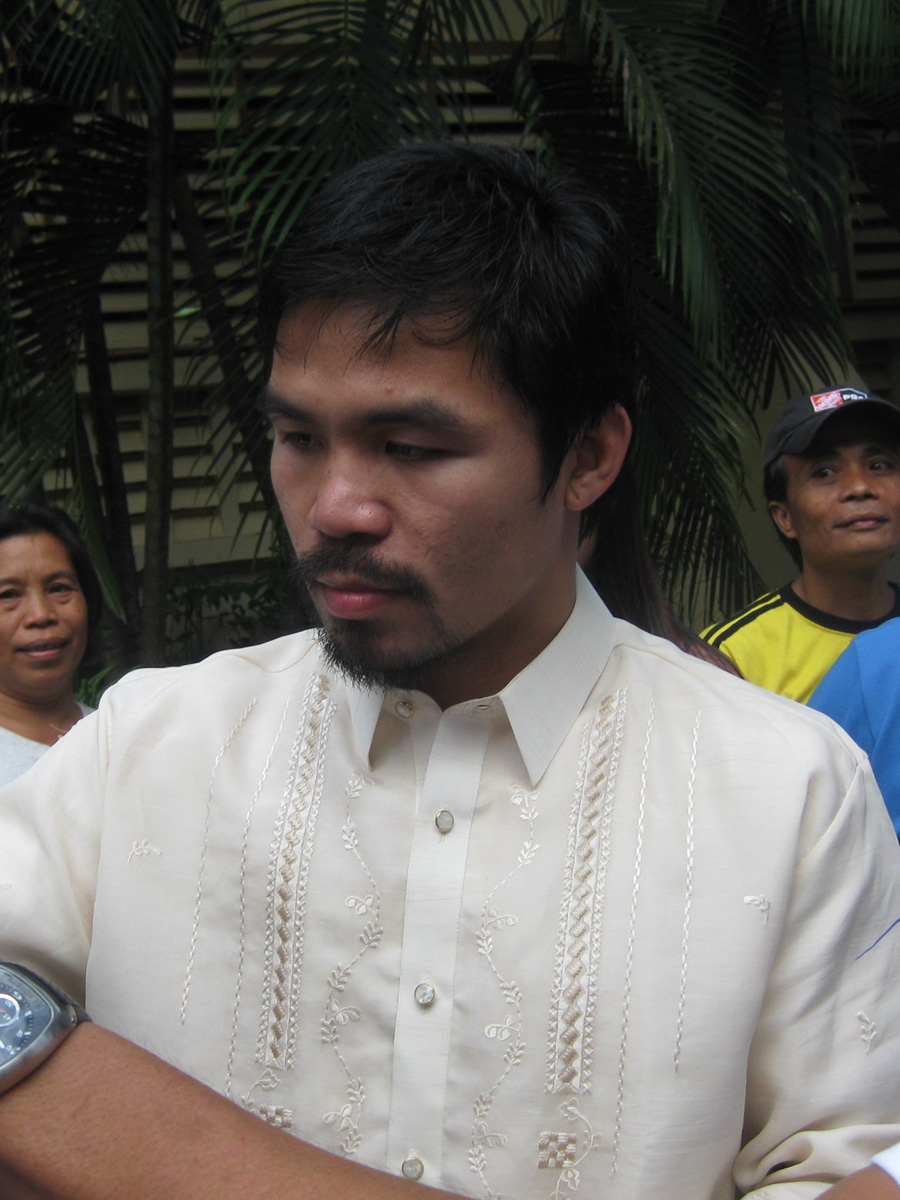
Manny Pacquiao

Congressman from Sarangani Manny Pacquiao said on DZBB radio during the press conference of his 2011 fight against Juan Manuel Marquez in Mexico that "Come 2016 I am going to run (for) vice president... No more boxing at that time." but later backtracked when he said "No, it's not possible yet. I'm not old enough" because he will only be 37 years old during the elections – 3 years short of the constitutional age requirement of 40.

Jejomar Binay has later said that Pacquiao is one of the people UNA is eyeing for their senatorial slate.

==== Panfilo Lacson ====
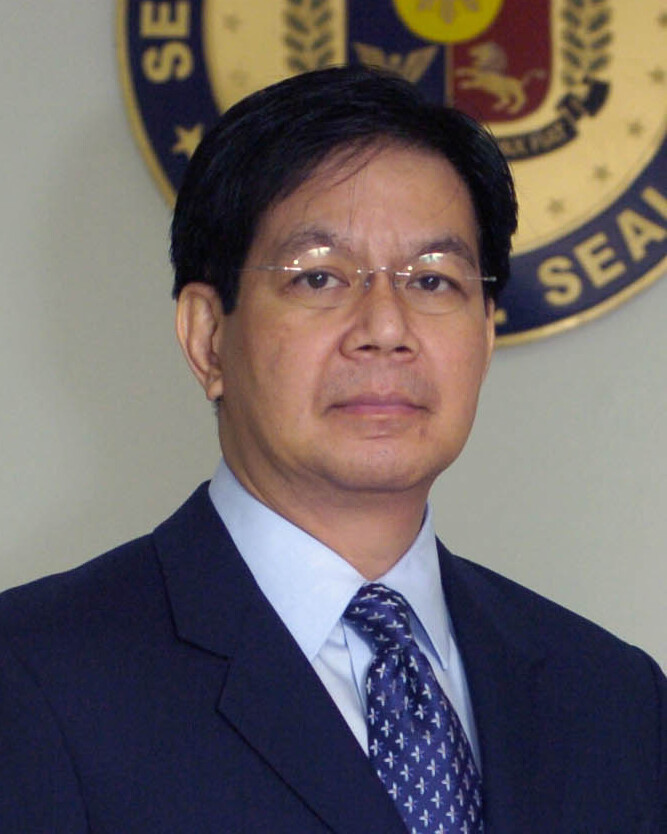
Panfilo Lacson

Interior and Local Government Secretary Mar Roxas acknowledged that Panfilo Lacson is qualified to run in for president, but there have been no talks on the latter joining the Liberal Party. Despite this, he said in February 2014 that he is "color blind" to politics and would rather focus on rehabilitating areas hit by Typhoon Yolanda.

After resigning as presidential assistant for recovery in February 2015, Lacson, in a press conference at the Diamond Hotel in Manila, told reporters that he is "not planning, but contemplating" about running for the presidency. Aside from another presidential campaign, Lacson is considering a return to the Senate, while ruling out local politics. In April 2015, Lacson confirmed that he has the intention in running for president, although his final decision would depend on many factors, which he didn't elaborate. On a press conference at Baguio a couple of weeks later, Lacson announced his intention to be an independent candidate for president. A month later, Lacson said that he will announce his decision to run for president after the next survey is released. However, he will no longer seek to run for president, but instead he now focused on his possible return to the senate in the coming elections.

==== Francis Pangilinan ====
In May 2014, then newly appointed Presidential Adviser on Food Security and Agricultural Modernization Francis Pangilinan said that "I'm not interested in the presidency, and I'm not interested in the elections at this time." By December 2014, a "Poe-Kiko", a pun on the Tagalog phrase for "my vagina", tandem of Grace Poe and Pangilinan was making rounds; Pangilinan describe it as "a joke" on the Christmas party of the National Irrigation Administration. and wished Poe "lives up to everybody's expectations."

By late August 2015, Pangilinan said in a budget briefing at the House of Representatives that he would announce his announce for 2016 "after the ghost month" of the Chinese calendar ends in September 12, with the Liberal Party looking to see him to lead the "powerhouse" senatorial ticket.

==== Manny Pangilinan ====
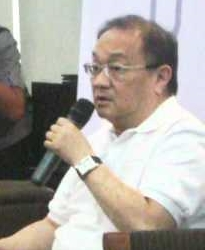
Manny Pangilinan

By late 2010, Manny Pangilinan, chairman of utility companies PLDT and Meralco. and of TV5, is claimed as a "dark horse" by political analysts. The businessman later commented on the rumors that he would seek an elective position, saying "there is no political blood that runs through my veins. I believe I can serve our people better some other way." He also said his decision was "final" amid encouragement from various sectors that he would make a great president, given his "technocratic skills."

==== Bong Revilla ====
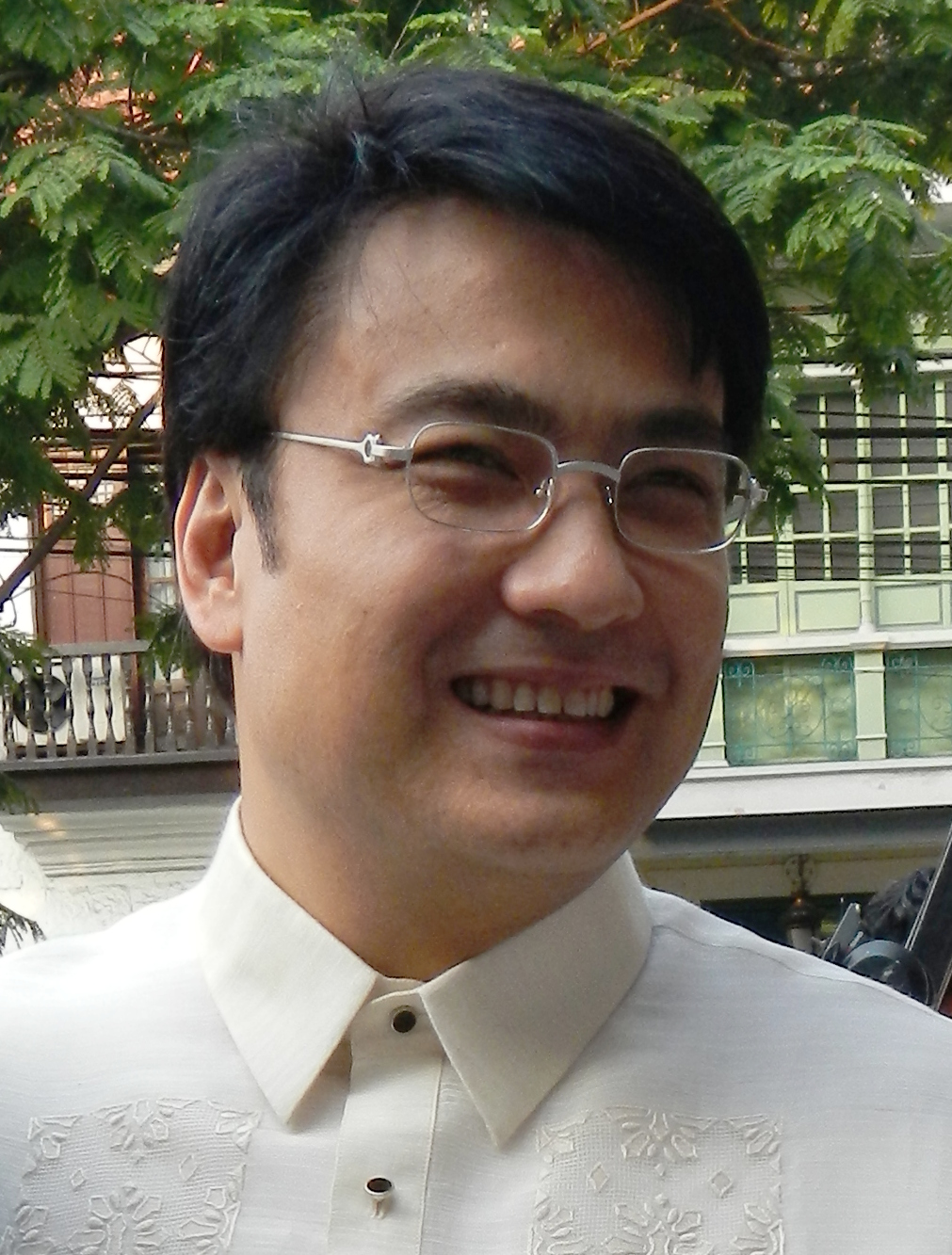
Bong Revilla

In January 2013, then House Minority Leader Danilo Suarez, Lakas–CMD vice-chairman, said that their party is likely considering Bong Revilla to be their candidate. Revilla later revealed that he is open to running for president and his involvement in the Priority Development Assistance Fund scam (PDAF scam) would not affect his political ambition.

Afters being jailed at the Philippine National Police custodial center in Quezon City due to the PDAF scam, Revilla in May 2015 said that he is still open to running in 2016, as no law prohibits incarcerated people from running. When pushed further, Revilla said ""No comment," as he may not be able to "get free: because of it.

While still in detention for his involvement in the PDAF scam, Revilla told reporters that his presidential ambition caused his detention, and that he was "at a loss" on what to do once the filing of candidacies started, On his plans for the presidency, he said that " I'm not in a hurry. I'm still young", and that he wanted to clear his name first before running.

==== Vilma Santos ====
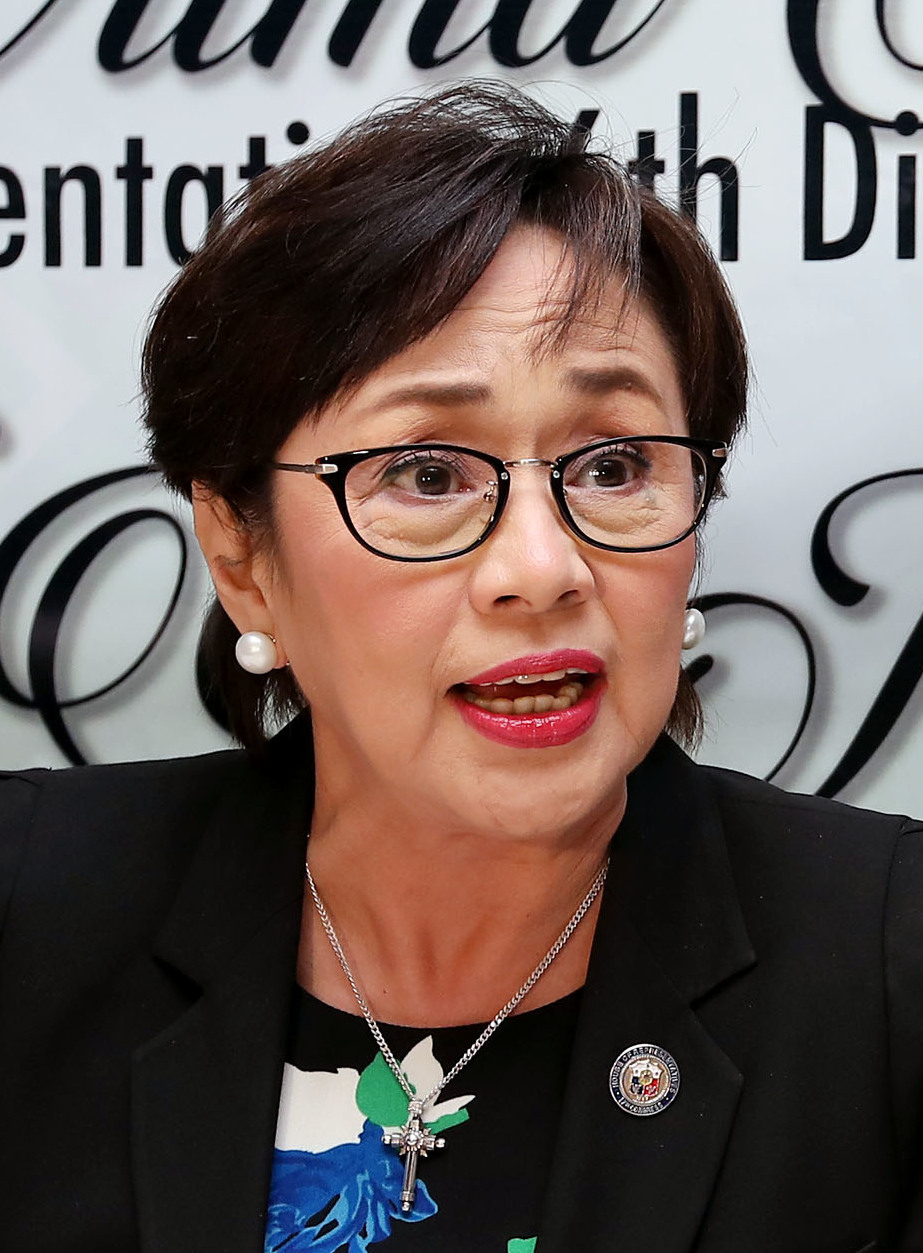
Vilma Santos

Vice President Binay's visit to Batangas in February 2014 fueled speculation that provincial governor Vilma Santos might be his running mate. In a later interview, he finally admitted to considering her as his vice-presidential candidate. However, her husband, Senator Ralph Recto, said in March 2014 that she is not planning to run for a higher position and might retire from politics instead.

In June 2015, after Duterte suggested that she could be his running mate, Santos herself dismissed reports that she is running for a higher position, and echoing her husbands earlier statements, may opt to return to showbiz instead after her term ends. Two months later, Santos said that if she'd run for public office in 2016, is that it would be for congresswoman from Batangas, and that she isn't running for vice president.

==== Gilberto Teodoro, Jr. ====
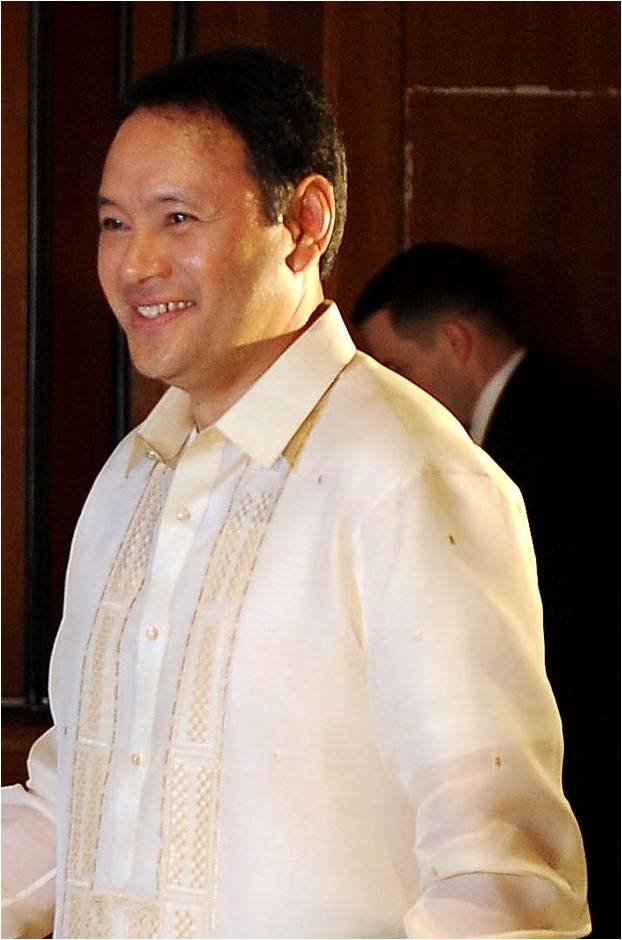
Gilberto Teodoro, Jr.

In September 2014, Davao City mayor Rodrigo Duterte said that, instead of being the running mate to Senator Santiago, he wanted Gilberto Teodoro, Jr. to be his running mate. In March 2015, Lakas–CMD national president Ferdinand Martin Romualdez said that his party is preparing for the 2016 elections; Danilo Suarez also remarked that they are convincing Teodoro to go out of retirement to run anew. However, Santiago chose Bongbong Marcos as her running mate in October 2015, the month after Alan Cayetano announced his bid for the vice presidency as Duterte's running mate.

==== Manny Villar ====
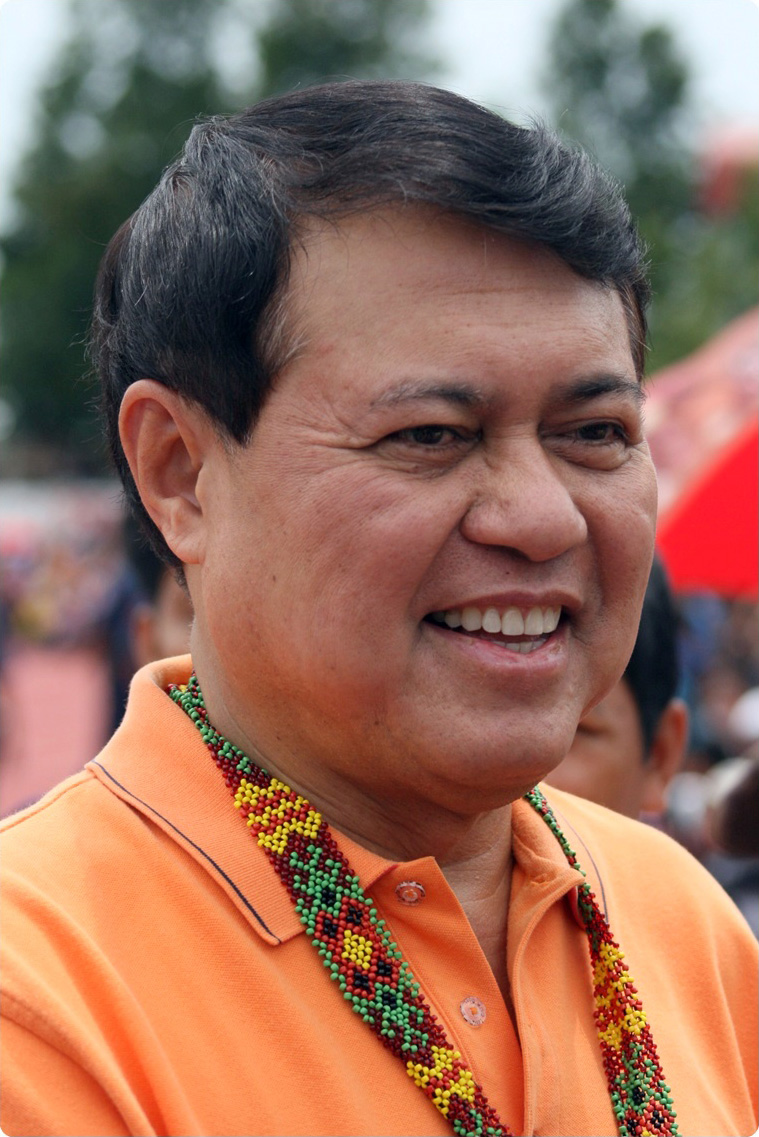
Manny Villar

His wife, Senator Cynthia Villar, did not rule the possibility of him running for president again, saying in March 2014 "You know, for Manny, presidency is destiny for him after 2010. He said if it's meant for you, then it will come. If not, then it won't come." Later, that year, when Jejomar Binay identified the former senator as a potential running mate, Cynthia said that "Villar is not running for vice president. Never."

In May 2015, Trillanes pushed for Villar to run anew, while his Villar's wife Cynthia said that the Nacionalistas failed to agree on their plans for 2016 during their Manila-Japan cruise, citing that it's too early to decide on plans for 2016 as the cause. By October, Villar's son Mark, also the representative from Las Piñas, said that "My father's definitely not running next election", adding that the elder Villar was enjoying his time as a businessman.
