= Candidates in the 2022 Philippine presidential election =

This is a list of candidates in the 2022 Philippine presidential and vice presidential elections.

For President	For Vice President / Running Mate	Winning President	Winning Vice President	Previous	Next
Ernesto Abella	N/A	Bongbong Marcos	Sara Duterte	Candidates in the 2016 Philippine presidential election	Candidates in the 2028 Philippine presidential election
Leody de Guzman	Walden Bello	Bongbong Marcos	Sara Duterte	Candidates in the 2016 Philippine presidential election	Candidates in the 2028 Philippine presidential election
Isko Moreno	Willie Ong	Bongbong Marcos	Sara Duterte	Candidates in the 2016 Philippine presidential election	Candidates in the 2028 Philippine presidential election
Norberto Gonzales	N/A	Bongbong Marcos	Sara Duterte	Candidates in the 2016 Philippine presidential election	Candidates in the 2028 Philippine presidential election
Panfilo Lacson	Tito Sotto	Bongbong Marcos	Sara Duterte	Candidates in the 2016 Philippine presidential election	Candidates in the 2028 Philippine presidential election
Faisal Mangondato	Carlos Serapio	Bongbong Marcos	Sara Duterte	Candidates in the 2016 Philippine presidential election	Candidates in the 2028 Philippine presidential election
Bongbong Marcos	Sara Duterte	Bongbong Marcos	Sara Duterte	Candidates in the 2016 Philippine presidential election	Candidates in the 2028 Philippine presidential election
Jose Montemayor Jr.	Rizalito David	Bongbong Marcos	Sara Duterte	Candidates in the 2016 Philippine presidential election	Candidates in the 2028 Philippine presidential election
Manny Pacquiao	Lito Atienza	Bongbong Marcos	Sara Duterte	Candidates in the 2016 Philippine presidential election	Candidates in the 2028 Philippine presidential election
Leni Robredo	Kiko Pangilinan	Bongbong Marcos	Sara Duterte	Candidates in the 2016 Philippine presidential election	Candidates in the 2028 Philippine presidential election
N/A	Manny SD Lopez	Bongbong Marcos	Sara Duterte	Candidates in the 2016 Philippine presidential election	Candidates in the 2028 Philippine presidential election

== Candidates for president ==
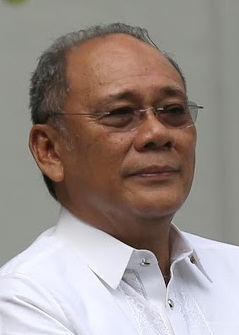
Former Presidential Spokesperson Ernesto Abella

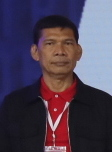
Leody de Guzman, chairman of the Bukluran ng Manggagawang Pilipino

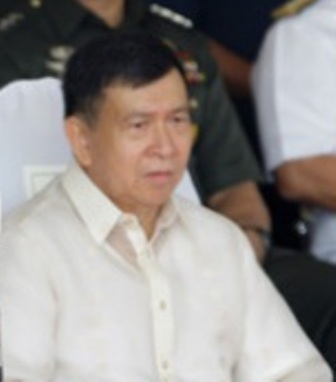
Former secretary of National Defense Norberto Gonzales

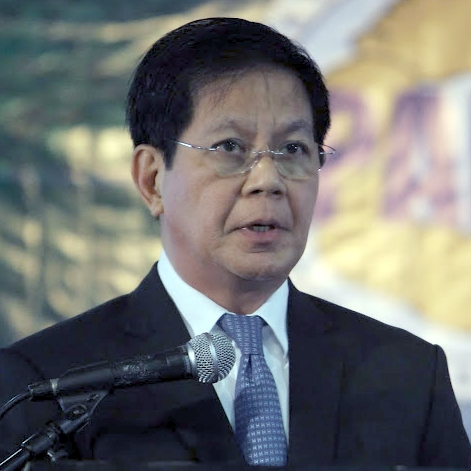
Senator Panfilo Lacson

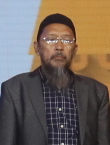
Businessman Faisal Mangondato

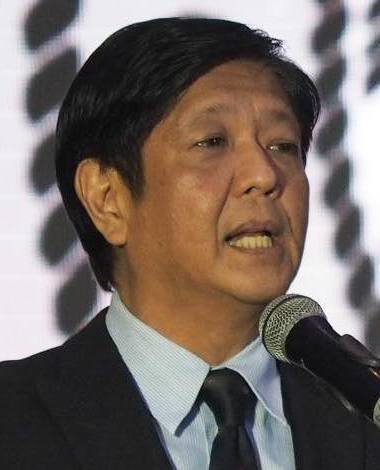
Former senator Bongbong Marcos

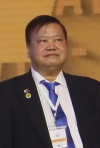
Doctor and Attorney Jose Montemayor Jr.

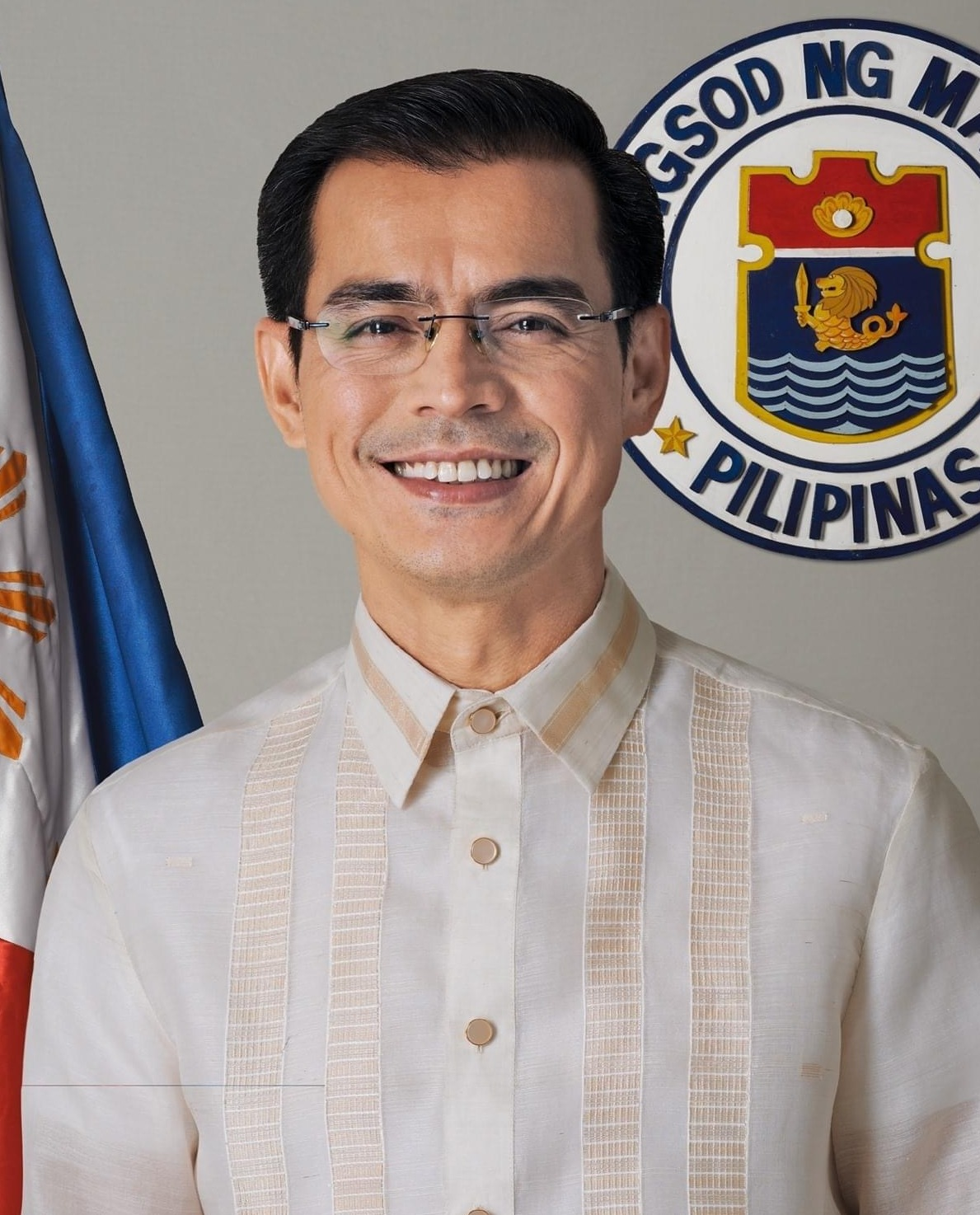
Mayor of Manila Isko Moreno

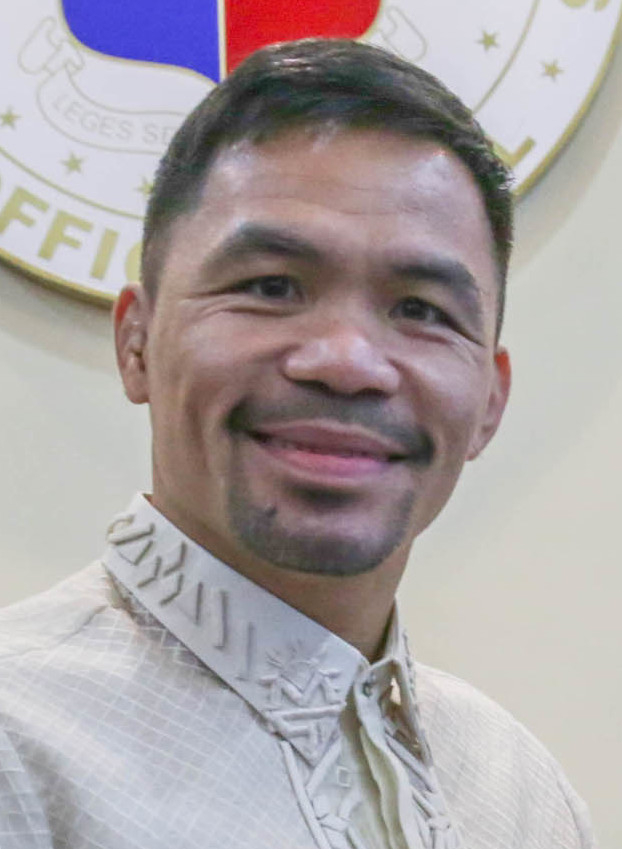
Senator Manny Pacquiao

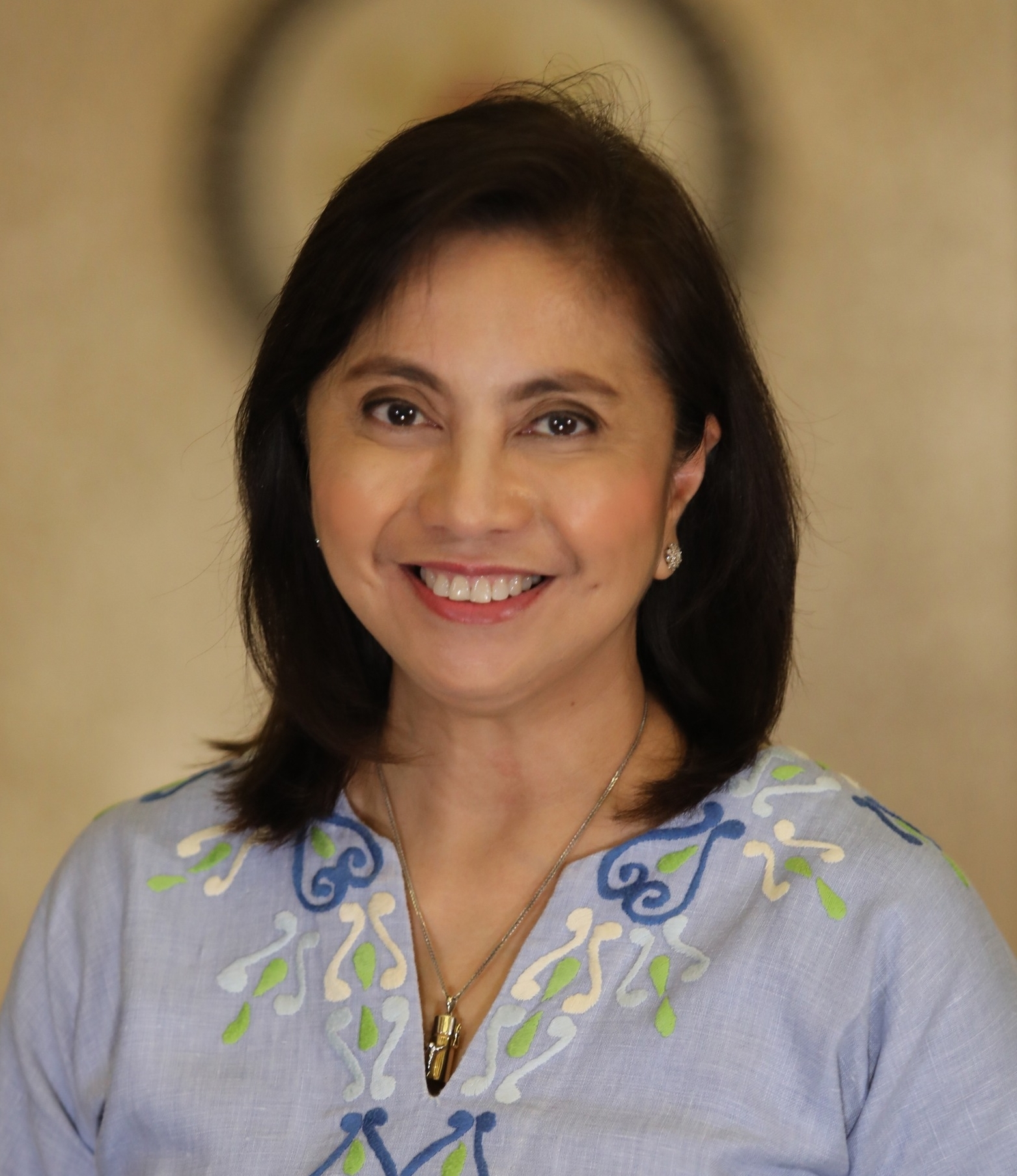
Vice President Leni Robredo
- Ernesto Abella (Independent), former undersecretary of Foreign Affairs and presidential spokesperson
- Leody de Guzman (PLM), current chairman of Bukluran ng Manggagawang Pilipino and founding member of Partido ng Manggagawa
- Norberto Gonzales (PDSP), former Secretary of National Defense
  - On September 30, 2021, the Philippine Democratic Socialist Party announced the candidacy of their party chairman, Gonzales in the 2022 elections.
- Panfilo Lacson (Independent), incumbent senator
  - In July 2021, Senate President Tito Sotto confirmed that Lacson will run for president in a tandem with him. On September 8, the duo announced their candidacies for the upcoming election.
- Faisal Mangondato (Katipunan ng Kamalayang Kayumanggi)
- Bongbong Marcos (PFP), former senator
  - By January 2020, Marcos confirmed that he is running "for a national position" in 2022, although he did not specify which position. By September 2020, Marcos's sister Imee said that her brother was still noncommittal to which position he'd run for. A year later, Marcos himself confirmed that "The presidency is not taken off the table." On September 21, the Partido Federal ng Pilipinas (PFP; transl. Federal Party of the Philippines) nominated Marcos to run for president. If Marcos accepts, he will be inducted as a member of the party and be made its chairman. During the national convention of the Kilusang Bagong Lipunan (KBL; transl. New Society Movement) in Binangonan, the party founded by his father, he was nominated as the party's candidate for president. Marcos, who remained a member of the Nacionalista Party, thanked KBL for the nomination, but said that he will announce his plans "when the time comes." On October 5, Marcos announced his presidential candidacy. Marcos then resigned from the Nacionalistas and was sworn in at the PFP chairman. Marcos ultimately filed his presidential candidacy under the PFP.
- Jose Montemayor Jr. (DPP)
- Isko Moreno (Aksyon), incumbent mayor of Manila
  - At the start of 2021, pollster Pulse Asia published an opinion poll showing Moreno in second place for president, and statistically tied for first with President Duterte in the vice presidential race. The 1Sambayan convenors group then included Moreno as one of the people they are choosing to run for president. Moreno begged off, as he was concentrating on his mayoral duties. By June, Moreno informed them that they are declining their offer. On September, Moreno was named president of Aksyon Demokratiko, the party founded by the late Raul Roco. Moreno announced his candidacy on September 22; his running mate will be Dr. Willie Ong.
- Manny Pacquiao (PROMDI), incumbent senator
  - Boxing promoter Bob Arum said in June 2020 that Pacquiao told him that he'd run for president instead of defending his Senate seat in 2022. A few days later, Pacquiao denied talking to Arum about politics. A year after that, sports official and former Bacolod mayor and representative Monico Puentebella said that Pacquiao is running for president, and that he was authorized by the latter to talk about politics. In September 2021, Pacquiao said that he only have three options in politics: run for president, run for reelection in the Senate, or retire from politics altogether. On September 19, he accepted the nomination of the PDP-Laban faction led by senator Koko Pimentel. On October 1, 2021, Pacquiao filed his certificate of candidacy for the presidency under PROMDI, the party founded by the late Cebu governor Lito Osmeña.
- Leni Robredo (Independent), the current Vice President of the Philippines
  - On September 30, 2021, 1Sambayan coalition (the coalition of the opposition), nominated Robredo for as their standard bearer. According to Armin Luistro, one of the conveyor of 1Sambayan, Robredo accepted the nomination and will file her candidacy on October 5. Robredo's spokesman clarified that she hasn't accepted a decision yet, but will make a decision on this before October 8. On October 7, Robredo accepted the nomination and announced she will run for president. She later filed her certificate of candidacy on the same day as an independent. Robredo explained that she is running as an independent to show that she is open to making alliances.

== Candidates for vice president ==
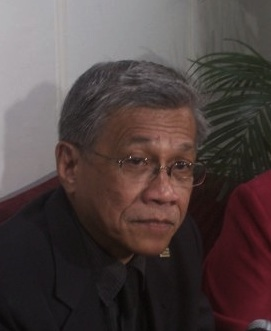
Former representative for Akbayan Walden Bello (PLM)

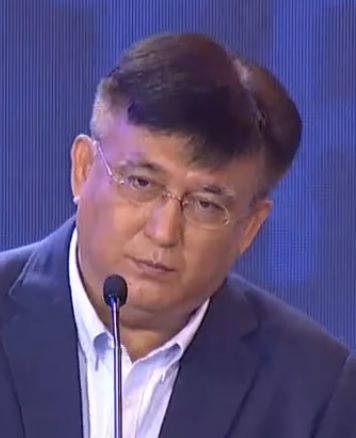
Rizalito David (DPP), former DENR Chief of Strategic Planning Section

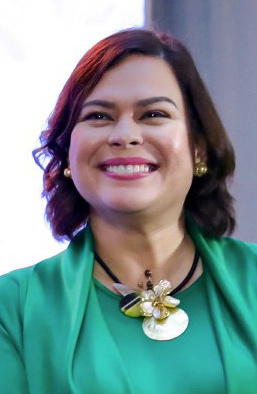
Mayor of Davao City Sara Duterte (Lakas)

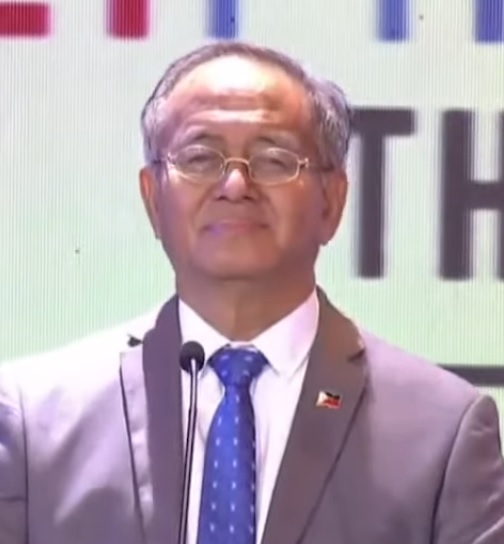
Manny SD Lopez (WPP), political activist

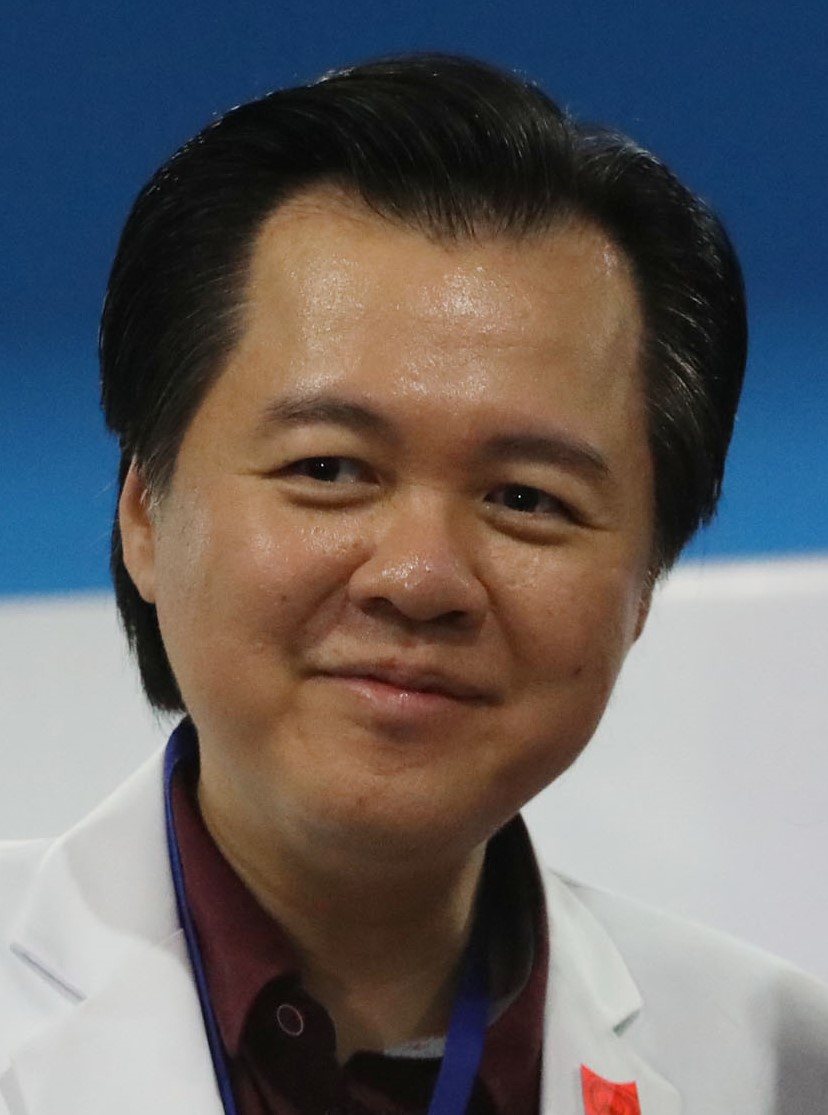
Willie Ong (Aksyon), cardiologist and media personality

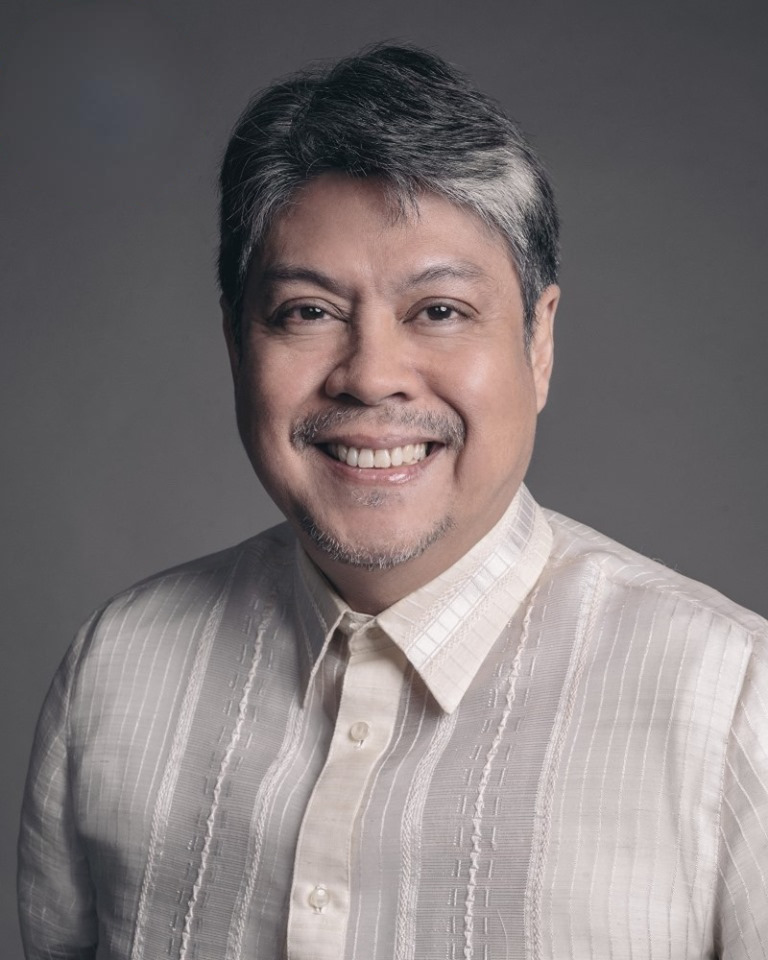
Senator Francis Pangilinan (Liberal)

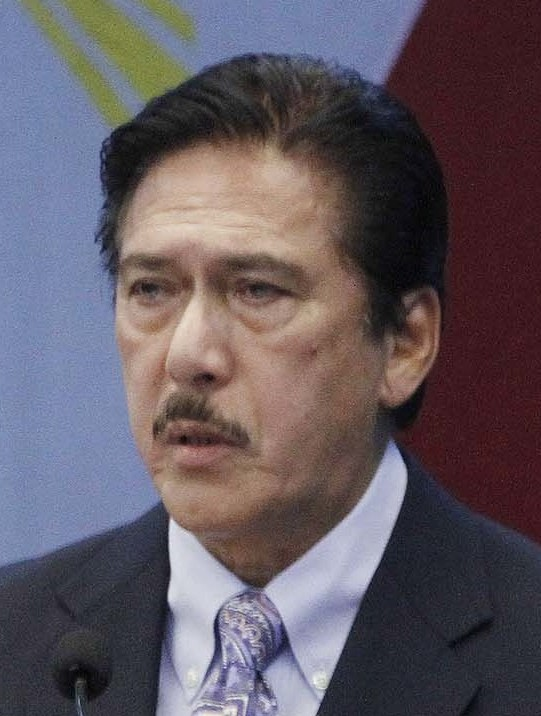
Senate President Tito Sotto (NPC)
- Lito Atienza (PROMDI), incumbent House representative for Buhay and House deputy speaker
- Walden Bello (PLM)
  - The Laban ng Masa (transl. Struggle of the Masses) coalition launched a campaign to collect 300,000 signatures to urge activist and former party-list lawmaker Walden Bello to run for president in the 2022 elections. In a statement, Laban ng Masa said it wants to "push for an ambitious platform that focuses on the poor, prioritizes the neglected, and fights for the rights of ordinary Filipinos." Bello's group sought talks with Vice President Robredo's backers for three months but were ignored. This caused them to support Leody de Guzman's presidential candidacy, instead. On October 20, Bello decided to run for the vice-presidency, replacing Raquel Castillo, who had been Guzman's running mate.
- Rizalito David (DPP)
- Sara Duterte (Lakas), incumbent mayor of Davao City
  - On July 9, 2021, Duterte said that she is open to run for president. However, there was no final decision yet. On September 9, 2021, she said that she is not running for president since her father, President Duterte was running for vice president, and they agreed that only one of them will run on a national position. On November 11, she resigned from Hugpong ng Pagbabago and later joined Lakas–CMD on the same day. She filed her candidacy on November 13, 2021, substituting Lyle Fernando Uy.
- Manny SD Lopez (WPP)
- Willie Ong (Aksyon), public health advocate and former Department of Health consultant
  - Ong will be the running-mate of Moreno; their ticket was officially announced on September 22, 2021.
- Francis Pangilinan (Liberal), incumbent senator
  - In June 2021, Pangilinan announced that he was seeking reelection to the Senate. After Vice President Robredo announced her presidential candidacy, several sources from the Liberal Party indicated that the senator would be her running mate for her presidential bid. Pangilinan did file his candidacy for vice president a day after Robredo.
- Carlos Serapio (Katipunan ng Kamalayang Kayumanggi)
- Tito Sotto (NPC), incumbent president of the Senate of the Philippines
  - In July 2021, Sotto announced that he will be Lacson's eventual running mate in the presidential race; this was followed by an official campaign announcement on September 8, 2021.

== Disallowed candidacies ==
A total of 97 individuals manifested their intention to run for president, while 29 did so for vice president.

The following have filed certificates of candidacies, formally notifying the commission that they are running, did not withdraw, and were not included in the tentative list of candidates released on December 24. These were either declared as nuisance candidates, were disqualified, or their candidacies cancelled.

=== For president ===
October 1

These people filed on October 1.

- Dave Aguila (Independent)
- Ley Ordenes (Independent)
- Edmundo Rubi (Independent)
- Laurencio Yulaga (PGRP)

October 2

These people filed on October 2.

- Victoriano Inte (Independent)

October 3

These people filed on October 3.

- Tiburcio Marcos (Independent)

October 4

These people filed on October 4.

- Sonny Boy Andrade (Independent)
- Delia Aniñon (Independent)
- Leo Cadion (PGRP)
- Winston Kayanan (Independent)
- Gabriela Larot (Independent)
- Maria Mercedes Pesigan (Independent)
- Melchor Puno (Independent)
- Alfredo Respuesto (Independent)
- Juanita Trocenio (Independent)
- Renato Jose Valera (Independent)

October 5

These people filed on October 5

- Arnel David (Independent)
- Leonardo Fernandez (Independent)
- Marsden Luyahan (Independent)
- Maria Aurora "Maria" Marcos (Independent)
- Edgar Niez (Independent)
- Valeriano Nocon III (Independent)
- Janelle Prado (Independent)

October 6

These people filed on October 6.

- Ramon Asuelo (Independent)
- Rudy Flores (Independent)
- Edencio Fronda (Independent)
- Happy Lubarbio (Independent)
- Dante Martirez (Federal Eastern Maharlika)
- Dolores Quirao (Independent)
- Luzviminda Raval (Independent)
- Benjamin Rivera (Independent)
- Sahiron Salim (Independent)
- Jimmy Torres (KBL)
- Danilo Villanueva (Independent)

October 7

These filed on October 7.

- Salic Arap (Independent)
- Ma. Antonia Aquino (Independent)
- Datu Rodulfo Basadre Jr. (Independent)
- Rolly Casino (Independent)
- Rodel de Vera (Independent)
- Ephraim Defiño (Independent)
- Alexander Encarnacion (Independent)
- Corina Joyce Felix (Independent)
- Nancy Megio (Independent)
- Domingo "Bro. Dingo" Mejia (Independent)
- Jose Romel Murio (Independent)
- Juan Juan Ollesca (Independent)
- Jeffrey Roden (Independent)
- Roosevelt Sta. Maria (Independent)

October 8

These people filed on October 8.

- Evelia Abarrondo (Independent)
- Loreto "MrLoy" Agcaoili (Independent)
- Juan Aguilar Jr. (Independent)
- Hilario Andes (Independent)
- Arsenio Antiporda Jr. (Independent)
- Gerald Arcega (Independent)
- Reysal Bahian (Independent)
- Bonifacio Bravo (Independent)
- Diosdada Dacillo (Independent)
- Orlando de Guzman (Partido Pederal ng Maharlika)
- Percival Kevin de Guzman (Independent)
- Diane de Leon (Independent)
- Ramon Raco Diaz (Independent)
- Arsenio Dimaya (Independent)
- Ricardo Domingo (Independent)
- Antero Fabito (Independent)
- Anthony Fajardo (HOPE)
- Edmundo Fuerte (Independent)
- Kamadhenu Gaa (Independent)
- Alejo Katigbak (Independent)
- Danilo Lihaylihay (Independent)
- Edgardo Los Baños (Independent)
- Erazo Lucio (Independent)
- Josephine Murillo (Independent)
- Felix Natnat (Independent)
- Robert Navarro (Independent)
- Eric Negapatan (Independent)
- Vladimir Ocampo (Independent)
- Ferdinand Jose Pijao (Independent)
- Deogracias Porio (Independent)
- Danilo Roble (Independent)
- Cesar Roca (Independent)
- Cornelio Seño (Independent)
- Apolonia Soguilon (Maharlika People's Party)
- Pedrito Tagle (Independent)
- Nestor Talion (Independent)

Substitutes

- Antonio Parlade Jr., former spokesperson of the National Task Force to End Local Communist Armed Conflict

The following were in the list of tentative candidates on December 24, but did not make it to the official ballot:

- Hilario Andes (Independent)
- Gerald Arcega (Independent)
- Danilo Lihaylihay (Independent)
- Maria Aurora Marcos (Independent)
- Edgar Niez (Independent)

=== For vice president ===
October 1

These people filed on October 1.

- Rochelle David (Independent)
- Alexander Lague (PGRP)
- Kurtney Love Bendana (Independent)

October 2

One person filed on October 2.

October 4

No one filed for vice president on October 3. These people filed on October 4.

- Princess Sunshine Amirah Magdangal (PGRP)

October 5

There was one person who filed on October 5.

- Melodino Villanueva (Independent)

October 6

There was one person who filed on October 6.

October 7

These people filed on October 7.

- Wilson Amad (Independent)
- Aeric Bernardino (Independent)
- Nathaniel Jayoma (Independent)
- Ferdinand Lagondino (Independent)
- Bienvenido Lorque (KDP)
- Lourdes Tolentino (Independent)
- Leandro Verceles Jr. (Independent)

October 8

These people filed on October 8.

- Arlene Josephine Butay (Independent)
- Abdullatief Pumbaya (Independent)
- Elpidio Rosales Jr. (Maharlika People's Party)
- Rey Anthony Bereber (Independent)
- Nerrisa Navarro (KBL)
- Benedicto Jose (PDDS)
- Diego Palomares Jr. (Independent)
- Joel Sison (KBL)

== Candidates who withdrew ==
These are the candidates who have filed candidacies, but later withdrew:

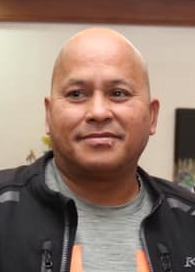
Senator Ronald dela Rosa

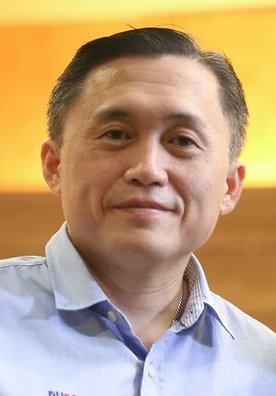
Senator Bong Go

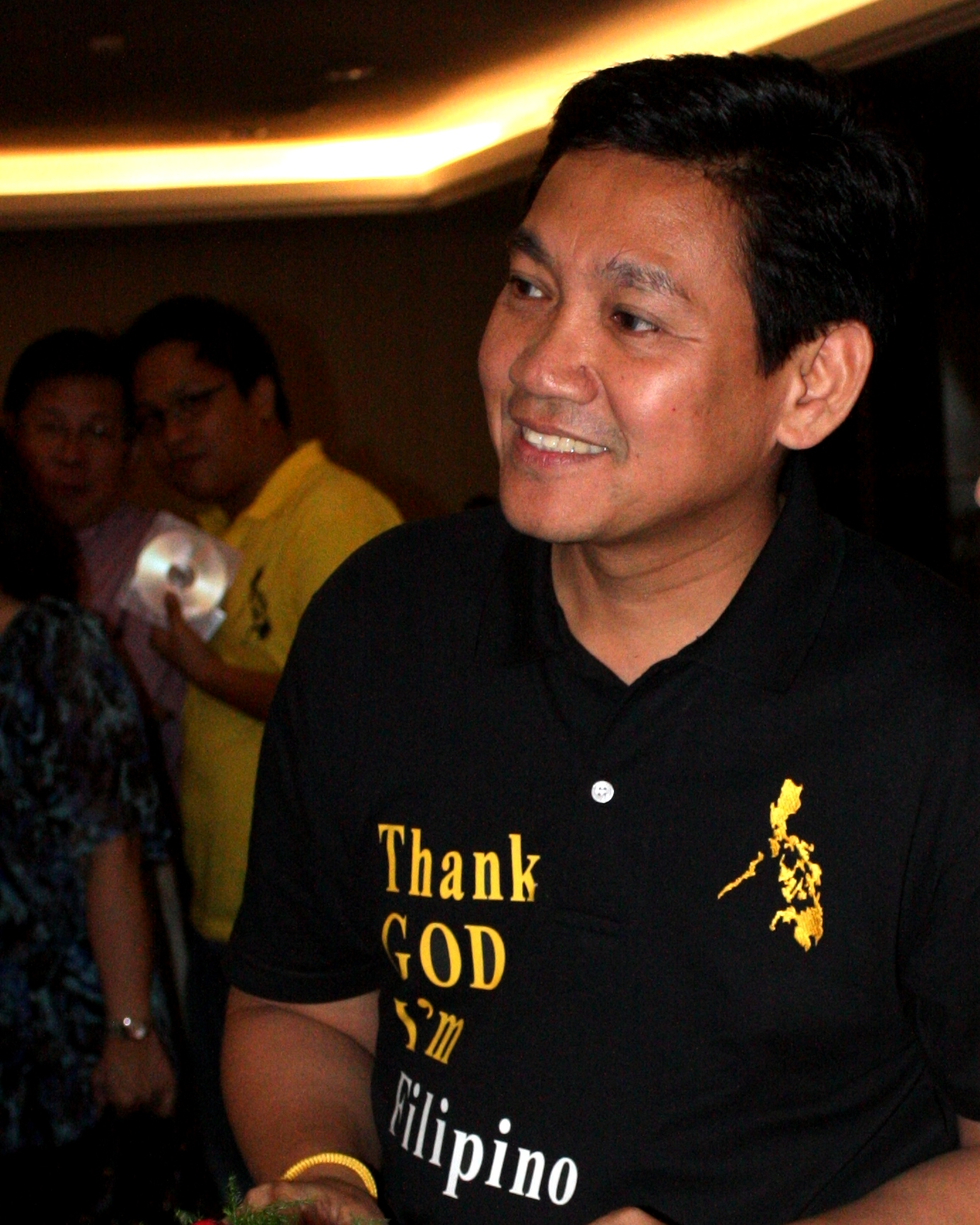
Alex Lacson, lawyer and author

=== For president ===
- Grepor Belgica (PDDS), incumbent presidential adviser on religious affairs
  - Withdrew in November 13; substituted by Bong Go.
- Anna Capella Velasco (Lakas)
  - Withdrew on November 13.
- Ronald dela Rosa (PDP–Laban), incumbent senator
  - On October 8, 2021, the last day of filing of candidacies, dela Rosa filed his candidacy, saying that PDP–Laban fielded him as no one else can continue the policies of the Duterte administration. When asked if he is mocking the election for serving as a placeholder for Davao City mayor Sara Duterte, dela Rosa said "I won as a senator, number 5," who did win in 2019 for senator. Dela Rosa later said that this has long been planned, but they were hiding it because it would've been criticized if it was revealed earlier. Days later, Dela Rosa revealed that he received a call from Energy Secretary Alfonso Cusi that they have chosen him as the standard bearer two hours before the deadline as he is the only one who can continue the president's legacy. Dela Rosa also said that he can give way if Mayor Duterte decides to run. Two days before the deadline for substitution, dela Rosa withdrew from the presidential race, in favor of his erstwhile vice presidential running mate Bong Go. Dela Rosa explained that it was a party decision for him to withdraw.
- Bong Go (PDDS), incumbent senator
  - On August 30, 2021, Go officially declined the endorsement of PDP–Laban to run for president. Over a week later, The PDP–Laban faction led by Energy Secretary Alfonso Cusi formally nominated Go to run for president on their convention anyway. Cusi said that Go did not close the door on himself running for president, but told him that "make him the last option." On October 2, Go filed his candidacy for vice president. Go subsequently substituted Grepor Belgica to run for president under the Pederalismo ng Dugong Dakilang Samahan. Go then announced his withdrawal from the presidential race on November 30. He then formally withdrew on December 14.
- Antonio Valdes (KDP)
  - Withdrew on November 13; substituted by Antonio Parlade Jr.

=== For vice president ===
- Alex Lacson (Ang Kapatiran), lawyer and author
  - Ang Kapatiran announced at its party convention on September 25, 2021, that it would field Lacson as its vice presidential candidate. On October 7, Alex Lacson filed to run for vice president. On October 8, Lacson withdrew in favor of Francis Pangilinan and filed to run for senator, instead.
- Raquel Castillo (PLM)
  - She was substituted by Walden Bello in October 20.
- Bong Go (PDP–Laban), incumbent senator
  - On October 2, Go filed his candidacy for vice president. On November 13, 2021, Go withdrew his candidacy for vice president under PDP–Laban and filed his candidacy for president under PDDS after its presidential candidate Grepor Belgica withdrew on the same day.
- Lyle Fernando Uy (Lakas–CMD)
  - Withdrew in November 13; substituted by Sara Duterte.

== Declined to be candidates ==
Listed below are the personalities who, while have been suggested or speculated to run for either president or vice president but have since personally ruled out or denied the idea of running for either positions. Among these personalities include:

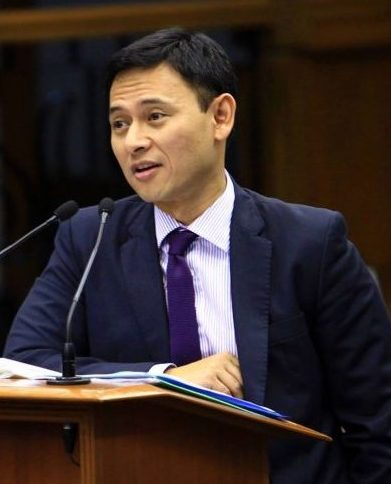
Senator Sonny Angara

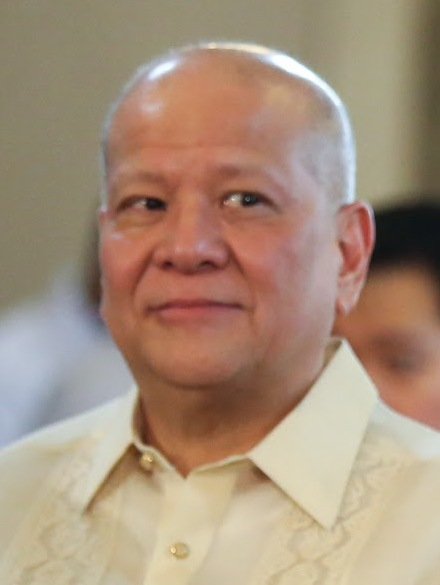
Ramon S. Ang, President, CEO and COO of San Miguel Corporation

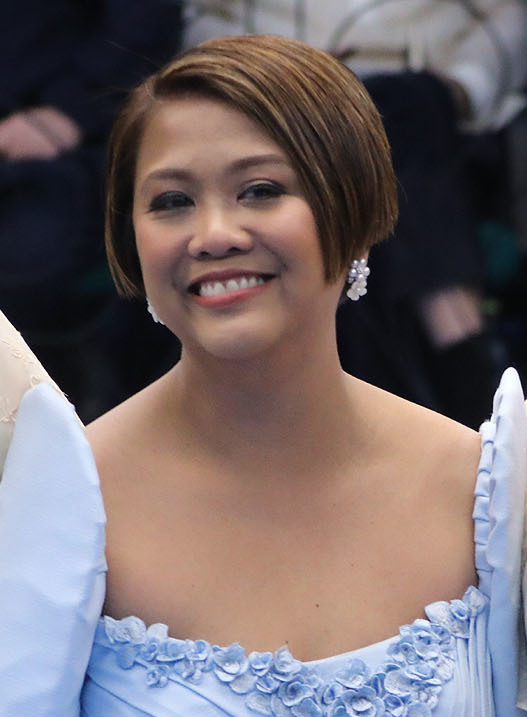
Senator Nancy Binay

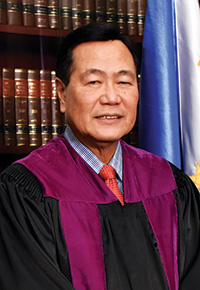
Former Supreme Court associate justice Antonio Carpio

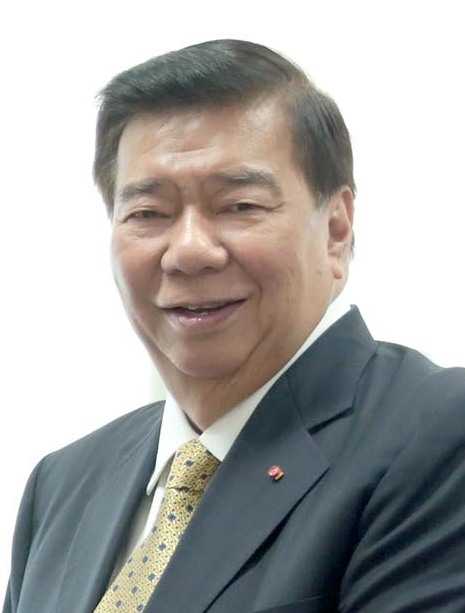
Senator Franklin Drilon

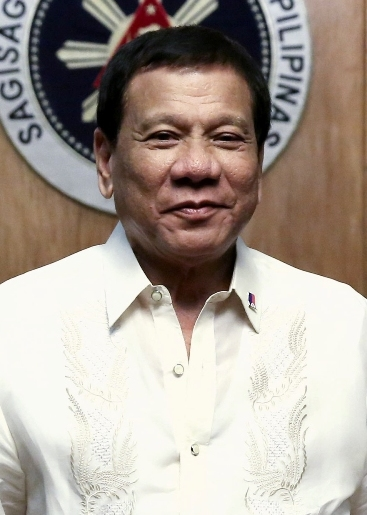
President Rodrigo Duterte

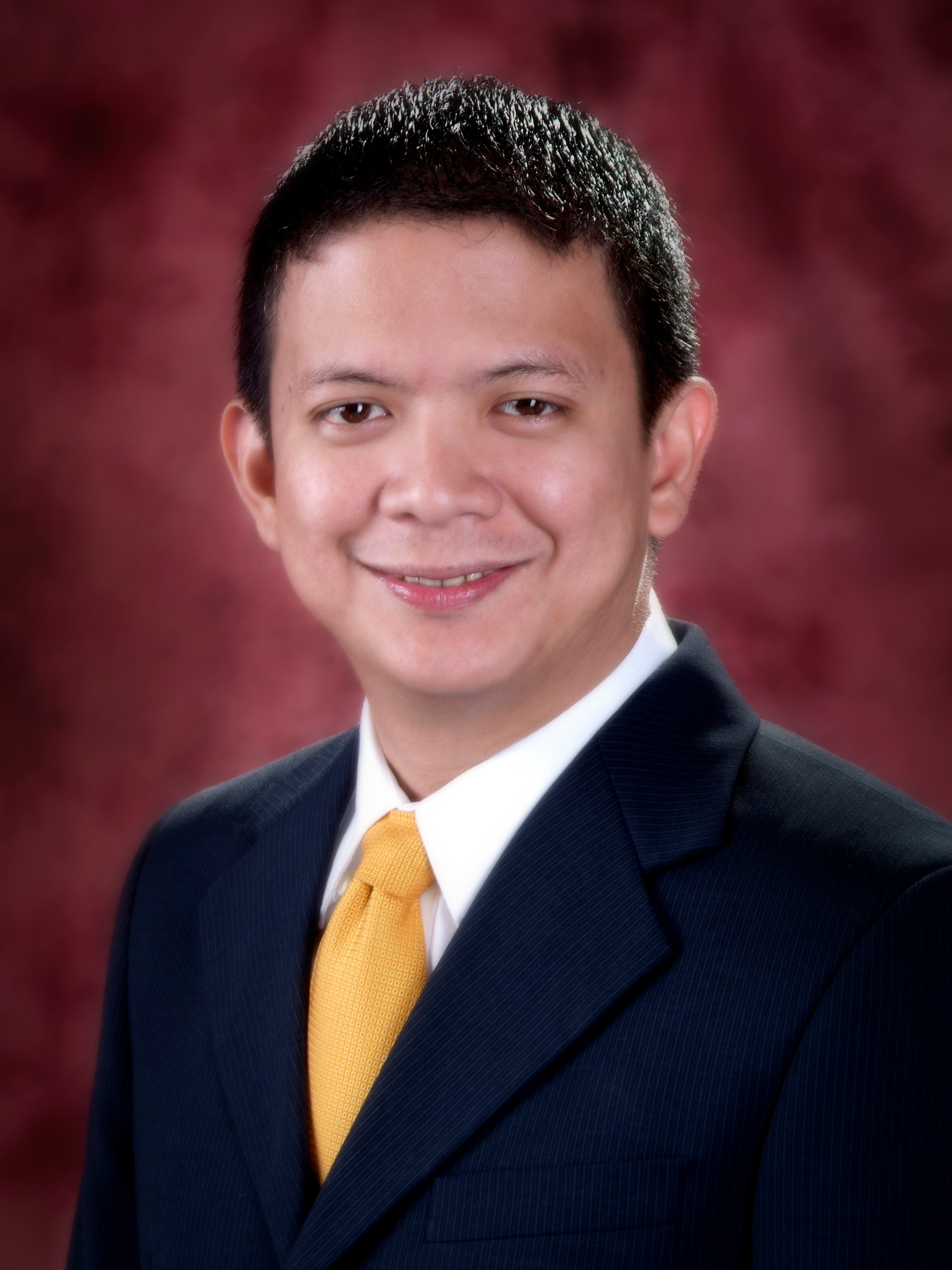
Governor of Sorsogon Francis Escudero

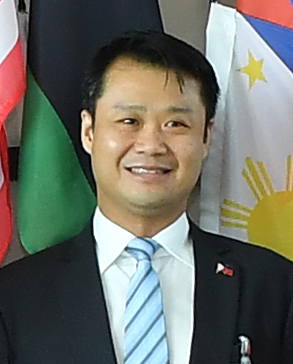
Senator Win Gatchalian

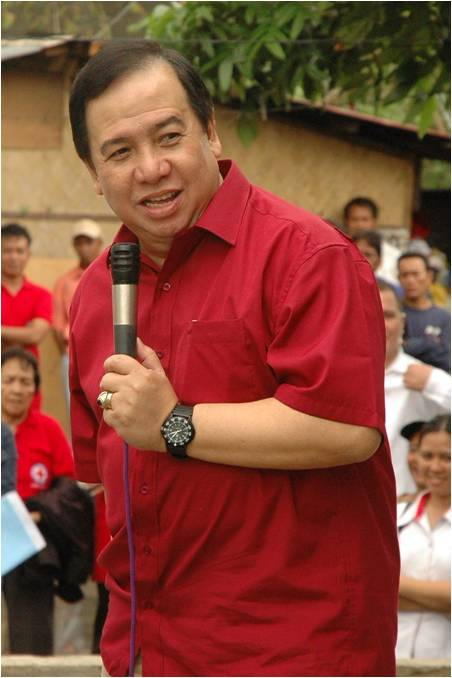
Senator Richard J. Gordon

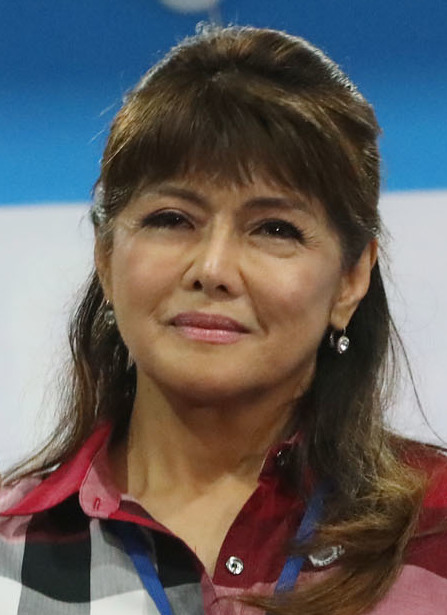
Senator Imee Marcos

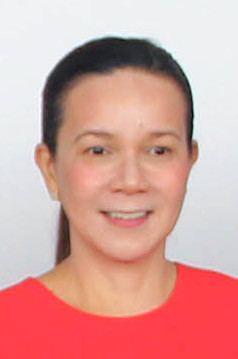
Senator Grace Poe

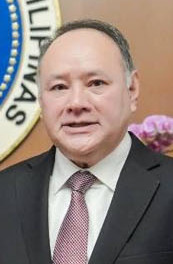
Former secretary of Defense Gilbert Teodoro

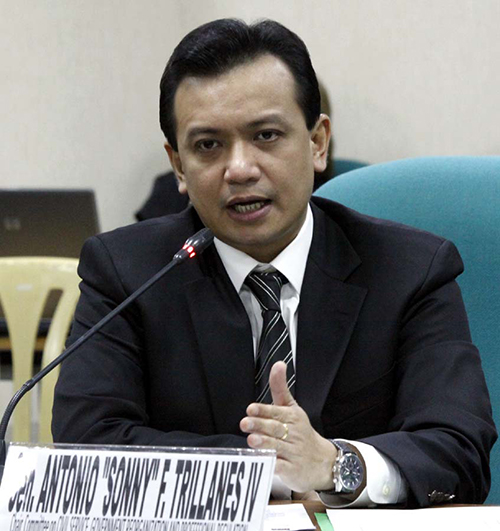
Former senator Antonio Trillanes

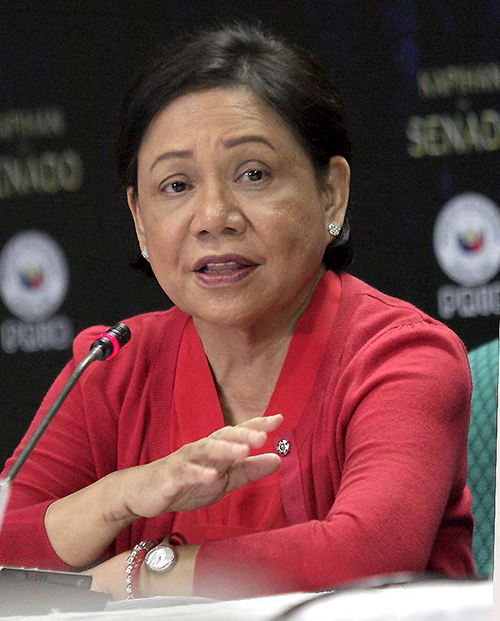
Senator Cynthia Villar

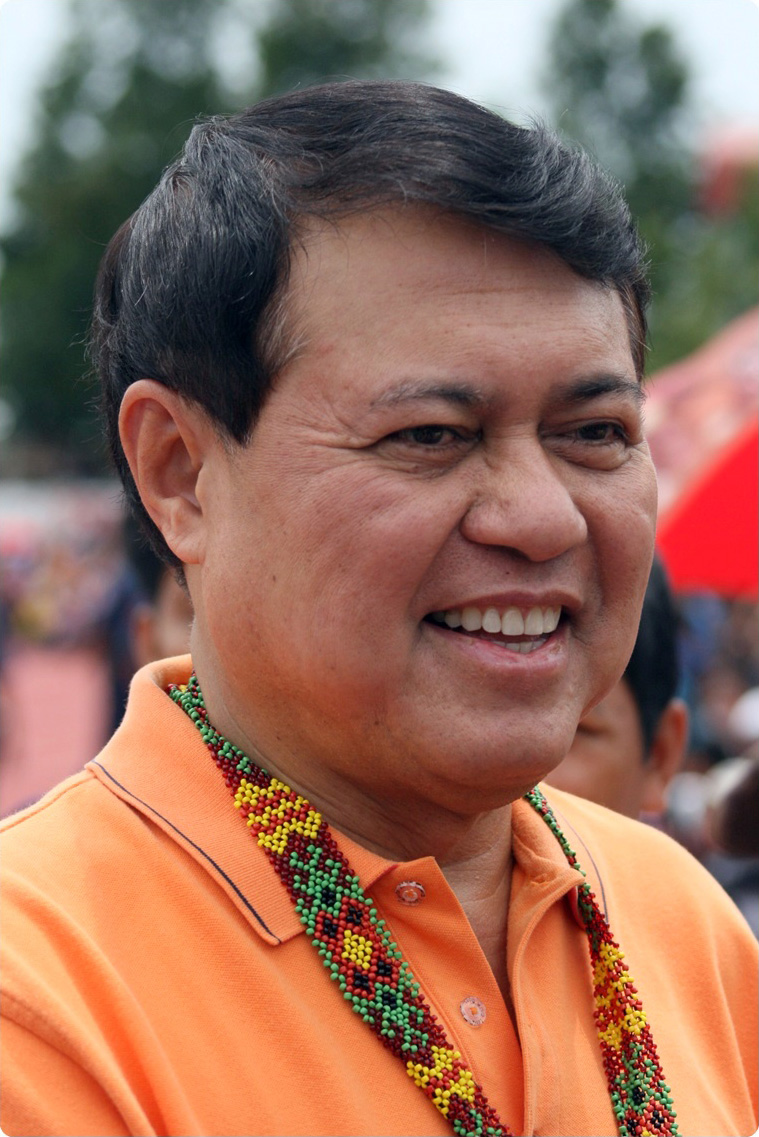
Former Senate President Manuel Villar

=== For president ===
- Franklin Drilon (Liberal), incumbent Senate minority floor leader
  - In an interview with ABS-CBN News Channel on July 22, 2020, Drilon declined running for president.
- Imee Marcos (Nacionalista), incumbent senator
  - In May 2019, Marcos said she was not thinking of running for president.
- Eddie Villanueva (CIBAC), incumbent House Deputy Speaker and House representative for CIBAC
  - On June 12, 2021, Villanueva was among the list that was released by the opposition coalition. He appreciates the trust and confidence by the coalition; however, he is "not interested" to run for president, according to his son Joel.
- Cynthia Villar (Nacionalista), incumbent senator
  - After topping the 2019 Senate election, Villar said that she "won't exert any effort" to run in 2022.
- Manuel Villar (Nacionalista), former senator and president of the Senate of the Philippines
  - While campaigning for senator in 2019, Villar's wife Cynthia said that he has no plans of running for president in 2022.

=== For vice president ===
- Win Gatchalian (NPC), incumbent senator
  - Gatchialian confirmed in August 2021 that he was considering a run for the vice presidency, if he will be the running mate of Sara Duterte. Gatchalian ultimately filed to defend his Senate seat.
- Grace Poe (Independent), incumbent senator
  - Poe was initially sought as a potential vice presidential running mate of Isko Moreno and Manny Pacquiao. Poe ultimately did not file to run in 2022.
- Martin Romualdez (Lakas), incumbent majority floor leader of the House of Representatives and House representative from Leyte's 1st district
  - President Duterte originally eyed Romualdez as the ruling coalition's vice presidential candidate. Romualdez ultimately sought to defend his House seat, instead.
- Gilbert Teodoro (Lakas), former Secretary of National Defense
  - Teodoro eventually ran for senator.

=== For both positions ===
- Ramon S. Ang, president and chief operating officer of San Miguel Corporation
  - Ang has repeatedly declined to seek public office, saying in August 2020 that "It is not in my best interest to run for office".
- Sonny Angara (LDP), incumbent senator
  - Angara was seen as potential presidential candidate. Angara ultimately did not file to run in 2022.
- Nancy Binay (UNA), incumbent senator
- Antonio Carpio (Independent), former associate justice of the Supreme Court of the Philippines
- Alan Peter Cayetano (Nacionalista), former speaker of the Philippine House of Representatives, incumbent House representative from Taguig-Pateros 1st district
  - While handling the Philippines's hosting of the 2019 Southeast Asian Games, Cayetano said that he had no plans of running in 2022. A few months later, Cayetano reneged on a gentleman's agreement between him and Lord Allan Jay Velasco for the speakership, a move that Edcel Lagman says that he has plans in running in 2022. By September 2021, he said that he is seriously considering either to run for president, or to defend his congressional seat. On October 1, Cayetano confirmed that he won't be running for president in 2022. Later that week, he filed to run for senator.
- Rodrigo Duterte (PDP–Laban), incumbent president of the Philippines
  - Duterte initially announced that he will support Martin Romualdez's vice presidential bid. Addressing the nation Monday, June 28, Duterte later admitted that running for vice president was "not a bad idea" but this would depend if there would be "space" for him in the polls. On July 17, 2021, Duterte announced his plans to run as vice president to be immune from possible cases against him." On August 24, 2021, Duterte accepted the endorsement by PDP-Laban to run for vice president citing his agreement to "make the sacrifice and heed the clamor of the people." A couple of weeks later, the PDP-Laban faction led by Energy Secretary Alfonso Cusi formally nominated Duterte for vice president. On October 2, Duterte backed down from his vice presidential nomination, announcing that he is retiring from politics. Duterte then filed his candidacy for senator. However, he withdrew on December 14.
- Francis Escudero (NPC), incumbent governor of Sorsogon
- Richard Gordon (Bagumbayan-VNP), incumbent senator
  - In 2017, President Duterte referred to Gordon as the country's next president. Gordon ultimately sought to defend his Senate seat.
- Vilma Santos (Nacionalista), incumbent House deputy speaker and House representative from Batangas' 6th district
  - She stated that she sincerely thank 1Sambayan for consideration to nominating her. However, she stressed that she has no plans for 2022. She wants to concentrate in serving her congressional district. Also she wishes to continue to do her legislative works in Congress.
- Antonio Trillanes (Magdalo), former senator
  - On May 12, 2021, Trillanes formally declared his intention to run for president, changing his status from being an alternate candidate to Vice President Leni Robredo "to being a principal candidate for President to vie for 1Sambayan coalition's nomination." However, he is open to give way to Robredo if she decides to run for president. He previously said in February 2020 that the highest position he'd run for was senator and that he'd support Robredo for president instead. With Robredo confirming her plans to run for president, Trillanes said that he will run for senator under her slate.
