= Leni Robredo 2022 presidential campaign =

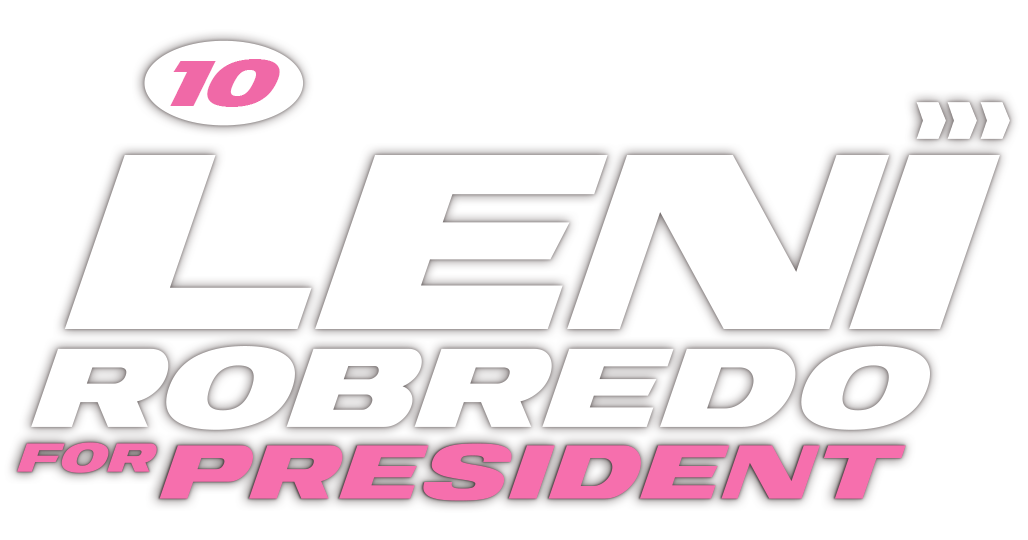
- Campaign: 2022 Philippine presidential election
- Candidate: Leni Robredo; Vice President of the Philippines (2016–2022); Camarines Sur's 3rd district representative (2013–2016); Mayor of Naga (2025–present); Francis Pangilinan; Senator of the Philippines (2001–2013; 2016–2022; 2025–present); Presidential Assistant for Food Security and Agricultural Modernization (2014–2015)
- Affiliation: 1Sambayan; Team Robredo-Pangilinan; Liberal Party; Akbayan; Katipunan ng Nagkakaisang Pilipino; Magdalo; Other political parties; Makabayan; National Unity Party; Partido Reporma (de facto) (Note: Partido Reporma originally nominated Panfilo Lacson as its standard-bearer until March 24, 2022, when it dropped him in favor of Robredo. While Lacson will now run as independent candidate, Reporma continues to endorse his running mate Tito Sotto as its vice presidential candidate and will continue to appear on the ballots as Lacson's party.)
- Status: Announcement: October 7, 2021; Official launch: February 8, 2022; Lost election: May 9, 2022
- Headquarters: Katipunan Avenue, Quezon City, Metro Manila
- Key people: Bam Aquino (campaign manager); Erin Tañada (senate slate campaign manager); Barry Gutierrez (spokesperson)
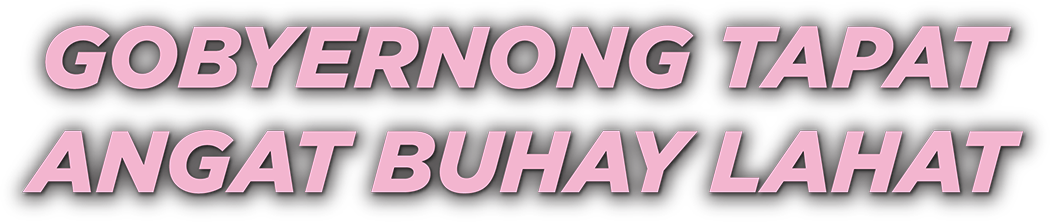
- Slogan(s): Gobyernong Tapat, Angat Buhay Lahat (transl. [With an] honest government, a better life for all); Husay at Tibay, Dapat si Leni! (transl. [With] skill and strength, it should be Leni!); Kulay Rosas ang Bukas (transl. The future is pink)

Website
- https://www.lenirobredo.com (Archived)

The 2022 presidential campaign of Leni Robredo began on October 7, 2021, when she filed her candidacy for the 2022 Philippine presidential election. At the time of her filing, Leni Robredo was the incumbent vice president of the Philippines, to remain so until June 30, 2022. Robredo was also formerly a representative of Camarines Sur's 3rd congressional district, from 2013 to 2016.

Robredo had been considered as a potential presidential candidate for the 2022 elections since her win in the 2016 Philippine vice presidential election; in 2021, she publicly expressed her interest to run for the presidency. After being nominated by an opposition coalition, 1Sambayan, she officially announced her candidacy in a press conference on October 7, 2021. She ran as an independent candidate despite being the chairperson of the Liberal Party, a move she explained as signifying her openness to alliances. On October 8, Robredo announced that her running mate would be incumbent senator Francis Pangilinan. Their campaign was officially launched on February 8, 2022, in Robredo's hometown, Naga.

Robredo ran on a platform of good governance and transparency. To address the then-ongoing COVID-19 pandemic in the Philippines and its effects on the economy, she vowed to prioritize improving the country's healthcare system, developing the country's industries, supporting small and medium-sized enterprises, and providing stable employment.

Robredo lost the election to Bongbong Marcos, garnering 27.94% of the vote and placing second. Robredo later urged her supporters to accept the results of the election, but did not explicitly concede to Marcos. Had Robredo been elected, she would have been the third female Philippine president after Corazon Aquino and Gloria Macapagal Arroyo, the first president to come from the Bicol Region, and the third vice president to run for the presidency and win.

== Background ==
=== 2016 vice presidential campaign and vice presidency ===
Leni Robredo ran in the 2016 Philippine vice presidential election as the running mate of Mar Roxas under the Liberal Party ticket. She won with 14,418,817 votes, or 35.11 percent of cast ballots, narrowly defeating her closest rival, then Senator Bongbong Marcos, by 263,473 votes or by 0.64 percent, the narrowest margin since the 1965 vice presidential election. Marcos filed an electoral protest on June 29, 2016; this would be dismissed by the Presidential Electoral Tribunal on February 16, 2021. On June 30, 2016, Robredo was sworn in as vice president of the Philippines at the Quezon City Reception House.

Robredo previously expressed disinterest in running for higher office. During her 2016 campaign, she stated that incumbent vice presidents should be barred from seeking the presidency. She reiterated her disinterest in November 2020 and March 2021, but in June 2021, she changed her position and expressed her openness to running for the presidency.

=== 1Sambayan ===
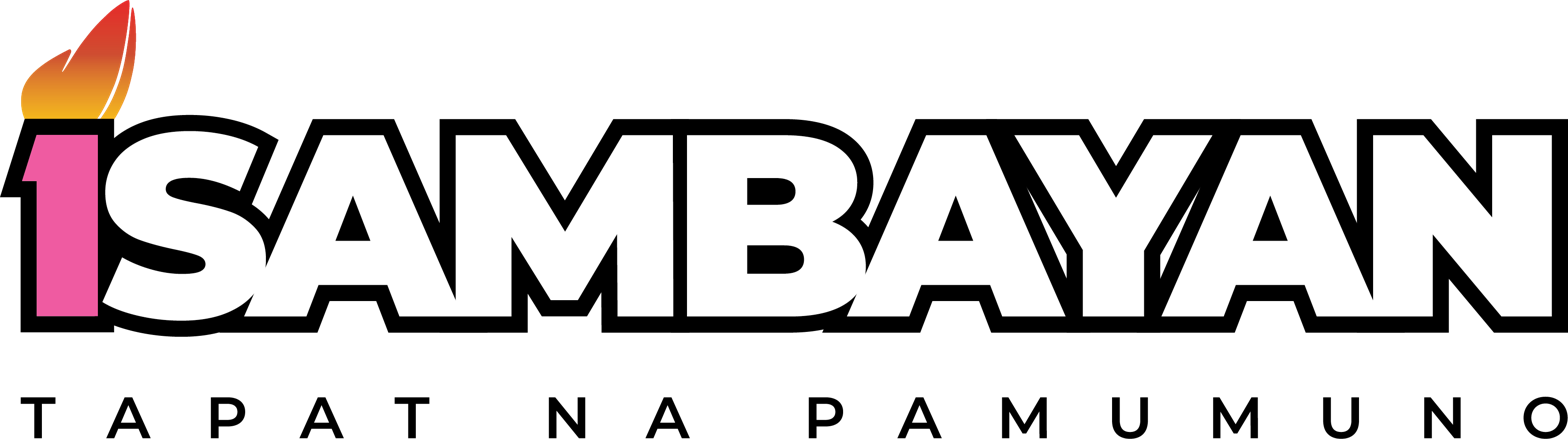
1Sambayan logo

In March 2021, former Supreme Court associate justice Antonio Carpio launched 1Sambayan (read as "isambayan", meaning "one nation"), a coalition that aimed to place one opposition candidate. Carpio was aiming not to split the vote, pointing out that Duterte won over Mar Roxas and Grace Poe in 2016 because those who were against him were not united. 1Sambayan formally began its selection process for a presidential and vice-presidential tandem on June 12, 2021, when they announced their six initial nominees. These included senator Grace Poe, vice president Leni Robredo, former senator Antonio Trillanes, human rights lawyer and former senatorial candidate Chel Diokno, incumbent house deputy speaker Vilma Santos-Recto, and CIBAC representative and house deputy speaker Eddie Villanueva. In the middle of 2022, Robredo, Trillanes, and Villanueva expressed their support for unity under 1Sambayan.

On September 30, 2021, the 1Sambayan coalition of the opposition nominated Robredo as their standard bearer. Former education secretary Armin Luistro, one of the convenors of the group, announced Robredo's acceptance of the nomination and the filing of her candidacy on October 5. Robredo's spokesman later announced, however, that Robredo had yet to accept the nomination and would be announcing her decision before October 8.

== Campaign ==
=== Announcement ===
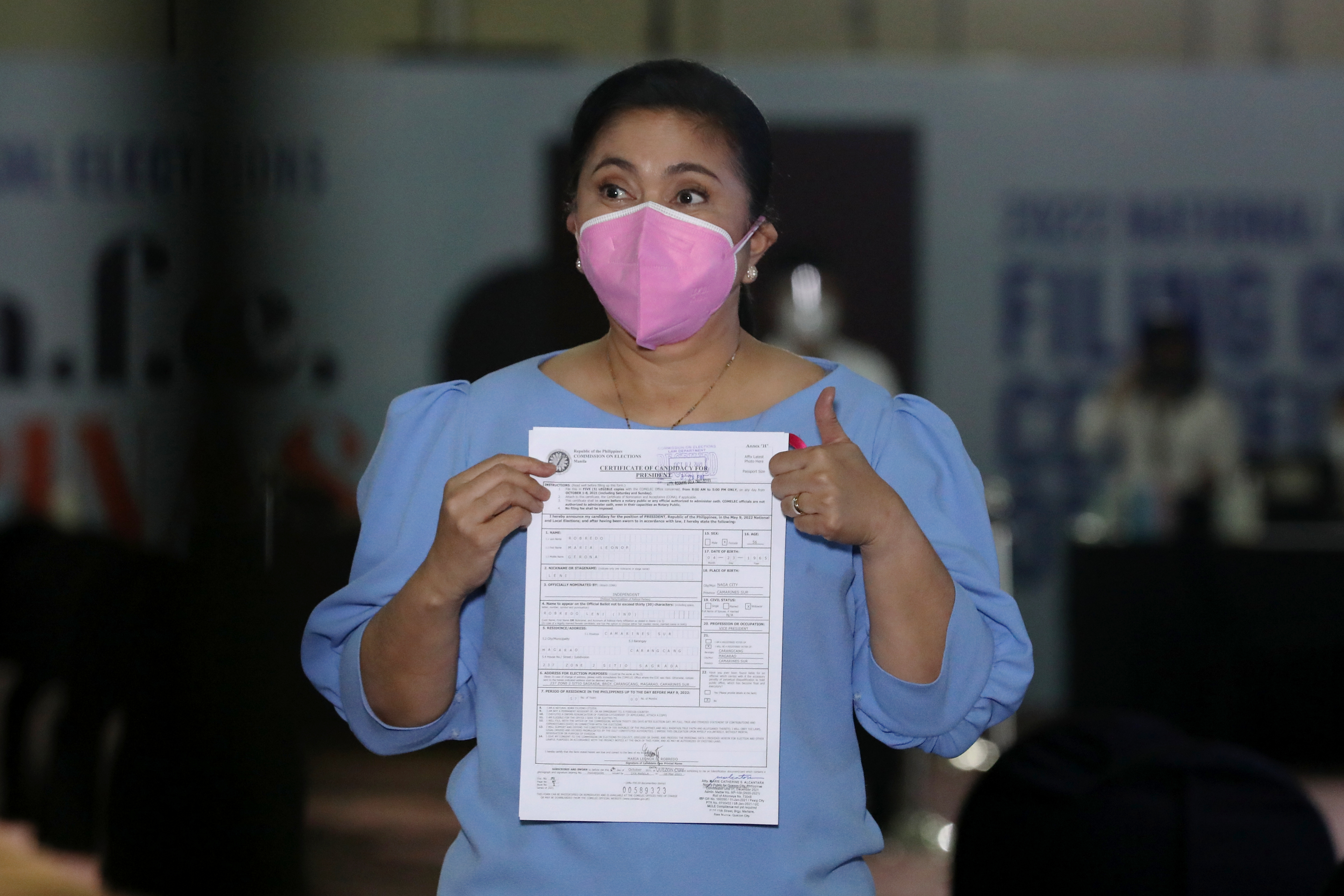
Robredo filed her certificate of candidacy on October 7.

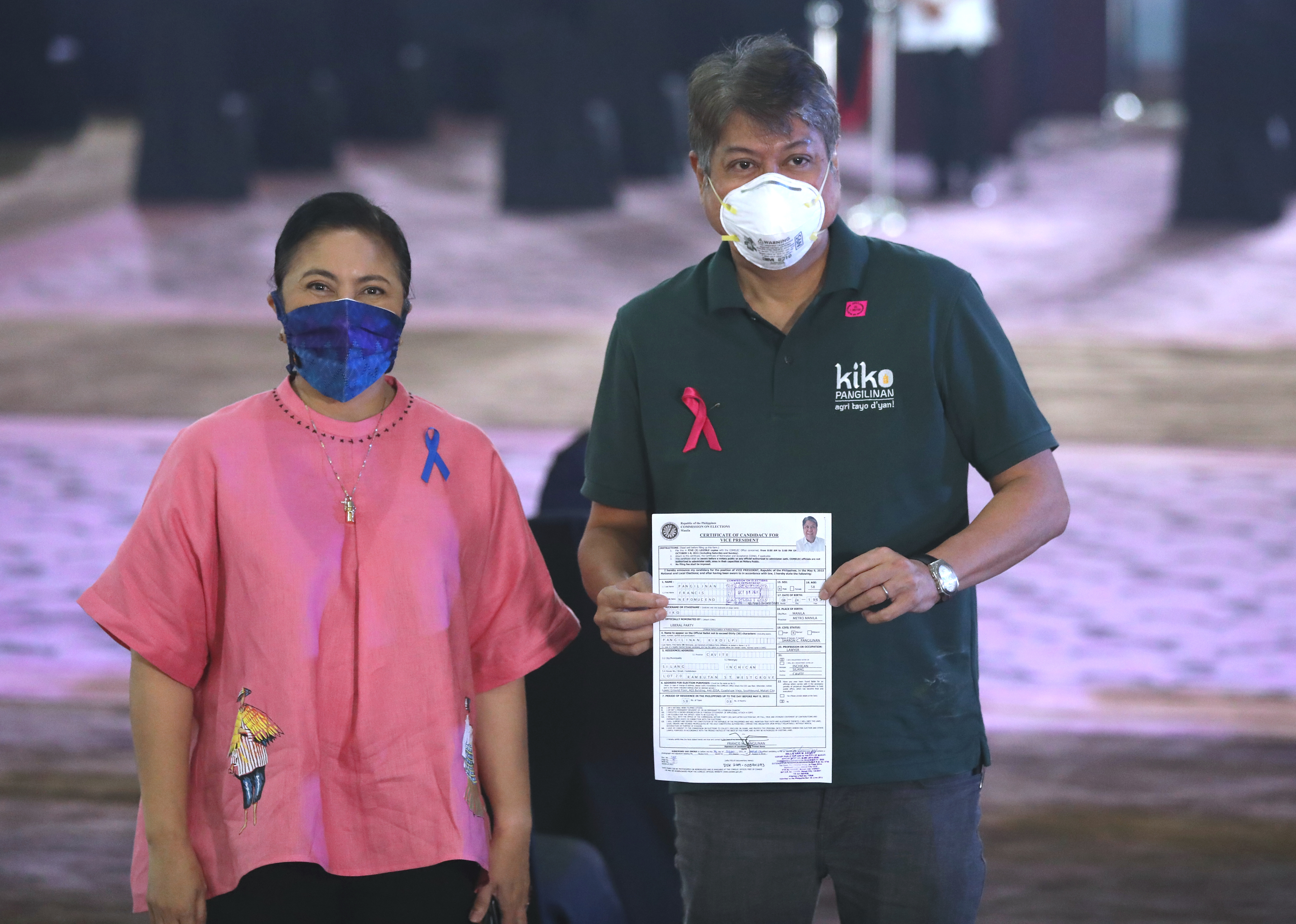
Pangilinan filed his certificate of candidacy on October 8.

On October 7, 2021, Robredo officially announced her candidacy and later filed her certificate of candidacy for the election. She ran as an independent politician rather than under the Liberal Party despite being its chairperson. Robredo's camp explained that this move represented her openness to forming alliances with other political groups. During the CNN Philippines presidential debate, she explained that she broke her previous vow to not run for the presidency because of fake news and disinformation, an enabling of corruption, and the "politics of the past." In a separate interview, she cited Bongbong Marcos' candidacy as one of the reasons that pushed her to run.

After Robredo announced her presidential candidacy, several sources from the Liberal Party indicated that the party's president, senator Francis Pangilinan, would be her running mate in her presidential bid. Pangilinan filed his candidacy for vice president a day after Robredo. While Robredo chose to file her candidacy as an independent candidate, despite remaining as the Liberal Party's chairperson, Pangilinan ran as the party's standard-bearer.

==== Key officials ====
Despite running as an independent, figures from the Liberal Party and its allied parties remained as key participants in her campaign. This included:

- Bam Aquino, former senator, cousin of former president Benigno Aquino III, campaign manager (Liberal)
- Erin Tañada, former deputy speaker, senate slate campaign manager
- Barry Gutierrez, spokesperson (Akbayan)

=== Branding ===
Campaign banner

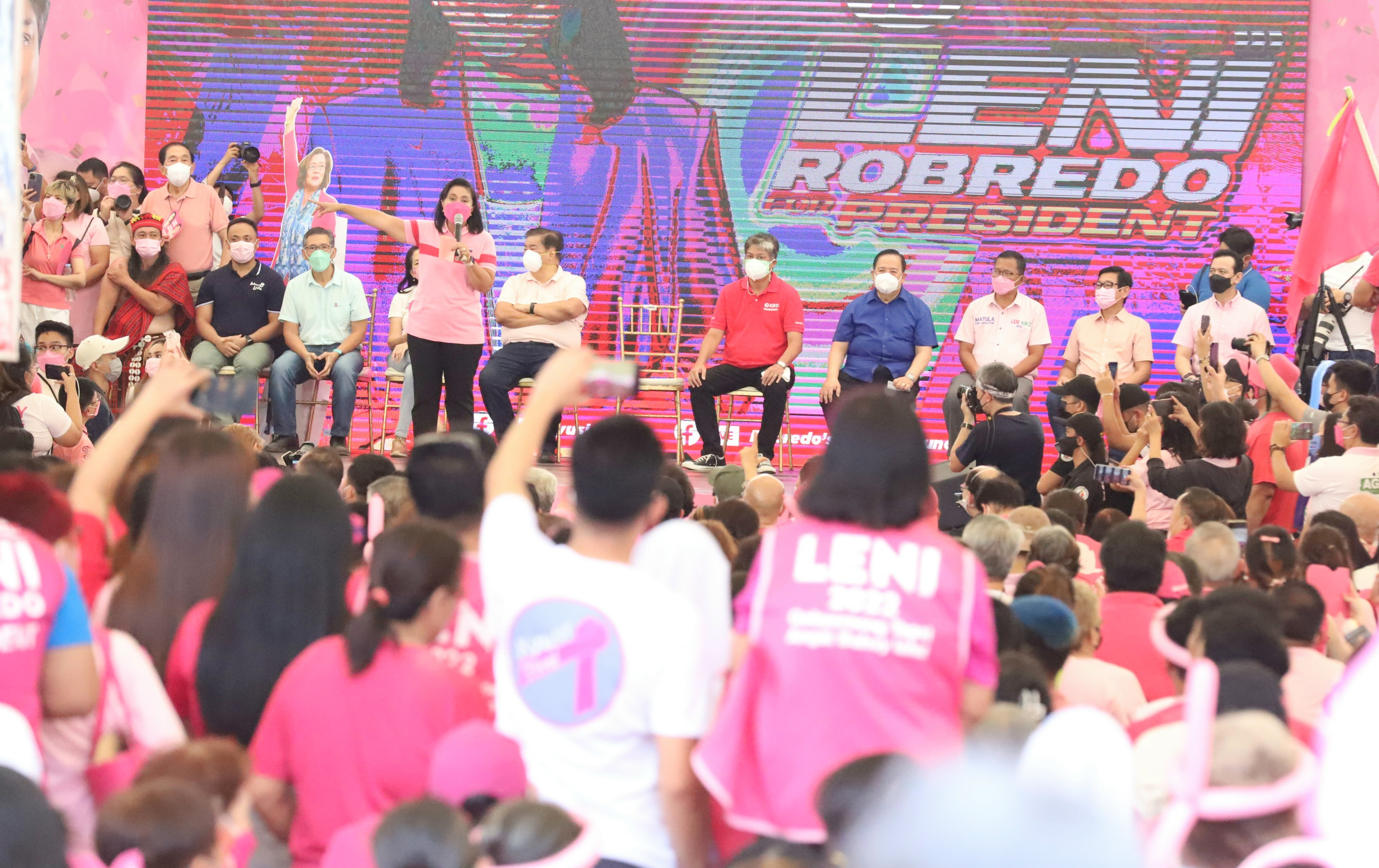
Robredo speaking at her "Pink Sunday" rally at the Quezon Memorial Circle in Quezon City, February 13, 2022

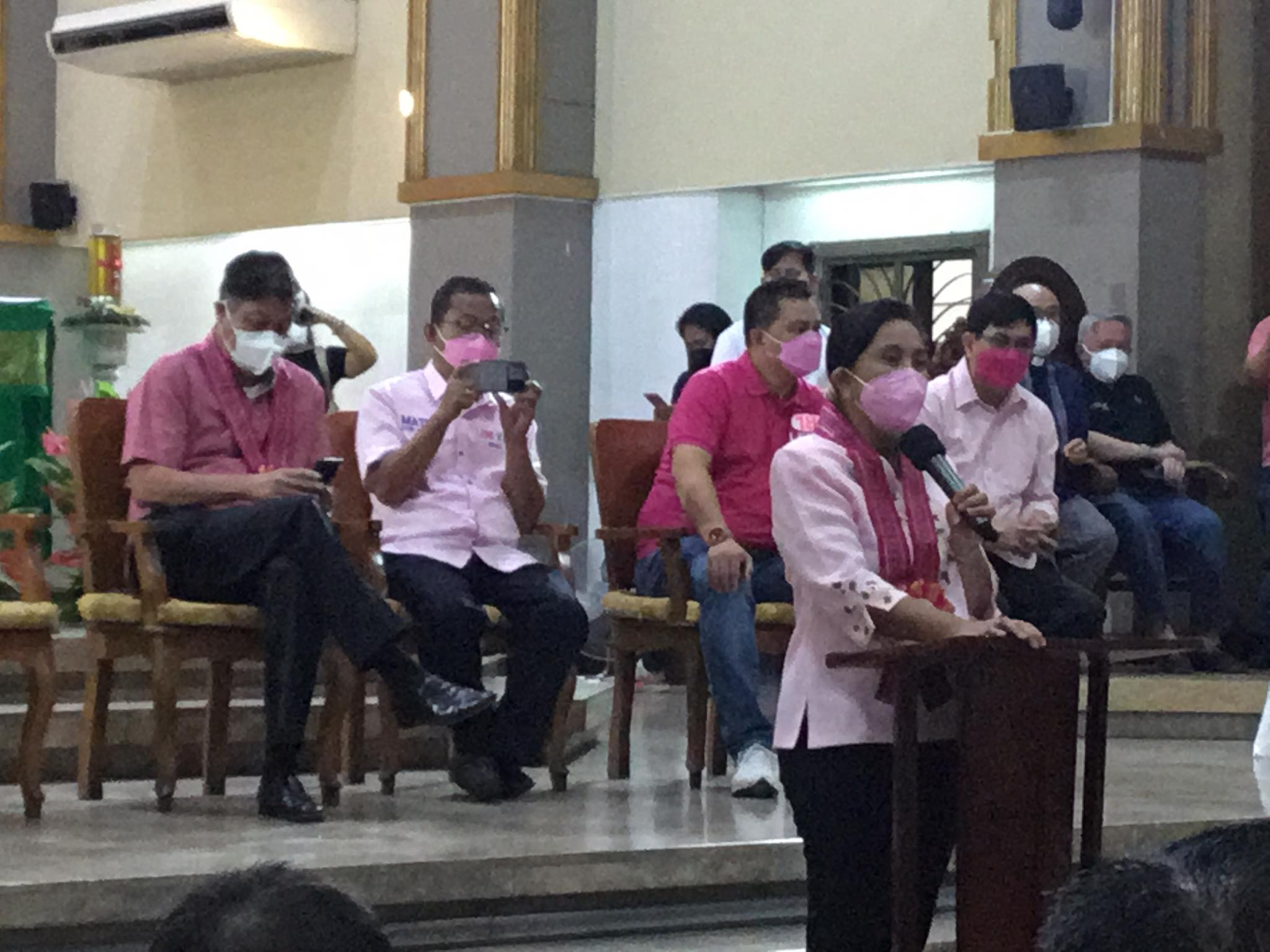
Robredo speaking at Novaliches Cathedral in Quezon City, March 1, 2022

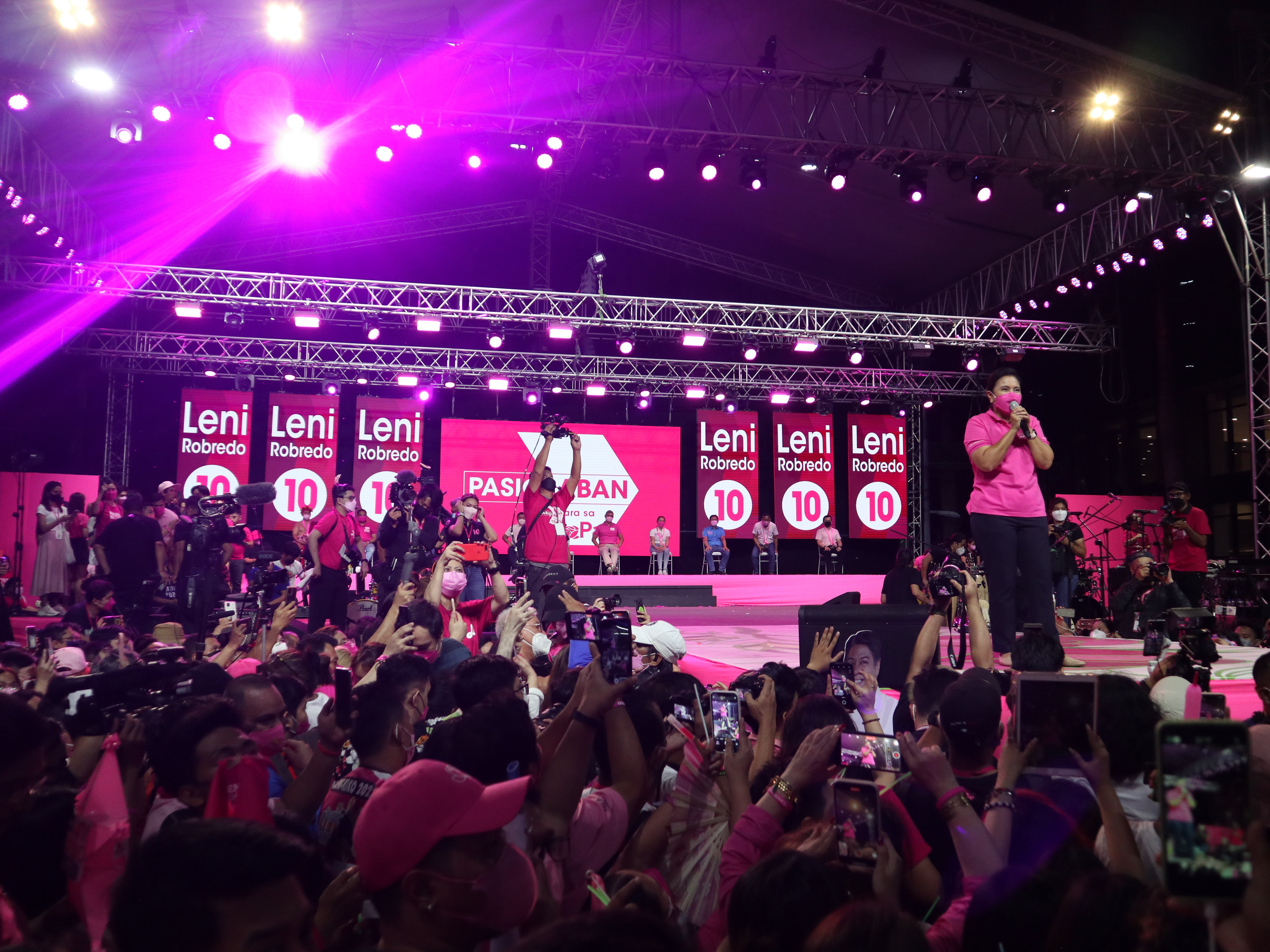
Robredo speaking at the PasigLaban rally in Ortigas Center, Pasig

Robredo described her campaign as a "people's campaign," citing her supporters' efforts in organizing her campaign, with rallies organized by local chapters of a volunteer-driven Robredo People's Council (RPC).

On its launch, the color her campaign used was hot pink, to signify "protest and change," and was popularized by 'Dapat si Leni', a group of Robredo supporters. This was a deviation from the bright yellow motif commonly associated with the Liberals. Her campaign initially planned to use blue as their main campaign color, but was yet to adopt a final theme color when pink was already being used by supporters and associated with Robredo and her campaign. According to Robredo, pink is "the color of a personality that is open, listening, loving and loving." The campaign's supporters adopted the moniker kakampink, a portmanteau of kakampi, which is Filipino for "ally", and "pink".

On January 11, 2022, Robredo and her campaign team unveiled their campaign tagline, "Gobyernong Tapat, Angat Buhay Lahat" (Honest Government, a Better Life for All). Based on Robredo's Angat Buhay program under the Office of the Vice President, the slogan was made to reflect the campaign's platform of good governance and transparency. On February 7, a day before the official start of the election campaign season, Robredo's campaign adopted the pink rose flower as its official symbol.

Several songs were made for and used by the campaign. The song "Kay Leni Tayo" (We're for Leni) was created for free by Nica del Rosario, Mat Olavides, Jeli Mateo, and Justine Peña. Del Rosario wrote and recorded another song for the campaign, "Rosas" (Rose), featuring Gab Pangilinan (Francis Pangilinan's niece), while Ogie Alcasid released "Handa Ka Na Ba kay Leni" (Are You Ready for Leni). Other songs used in Robredo's campaign rallies included "Liwanag sa Dilim" (Light in the Dark) by Rivermaya and "Alapaap" by the Eraserheads. Although she had no official hand signs like her opponents, some of her supporters would use the Laban sign, that was used during the 1978 Interim Batasang Pambansa elections by Lakas ng Bayan or LABAN, a political party formed by former senator Ninoy Aquino. The hand signal was also used in the presidential campaign of former presidents Corazon Aquino in 1986 and her son Benigno Aquino III in 2010. Some say that her hand signal is being associated with the Liberal Party, however this was also used to refer to Robredo's first letter of her nickname. Others would prefer the Finger heart, a hand signal that was popularized in South Korea.

=== Rallies ===
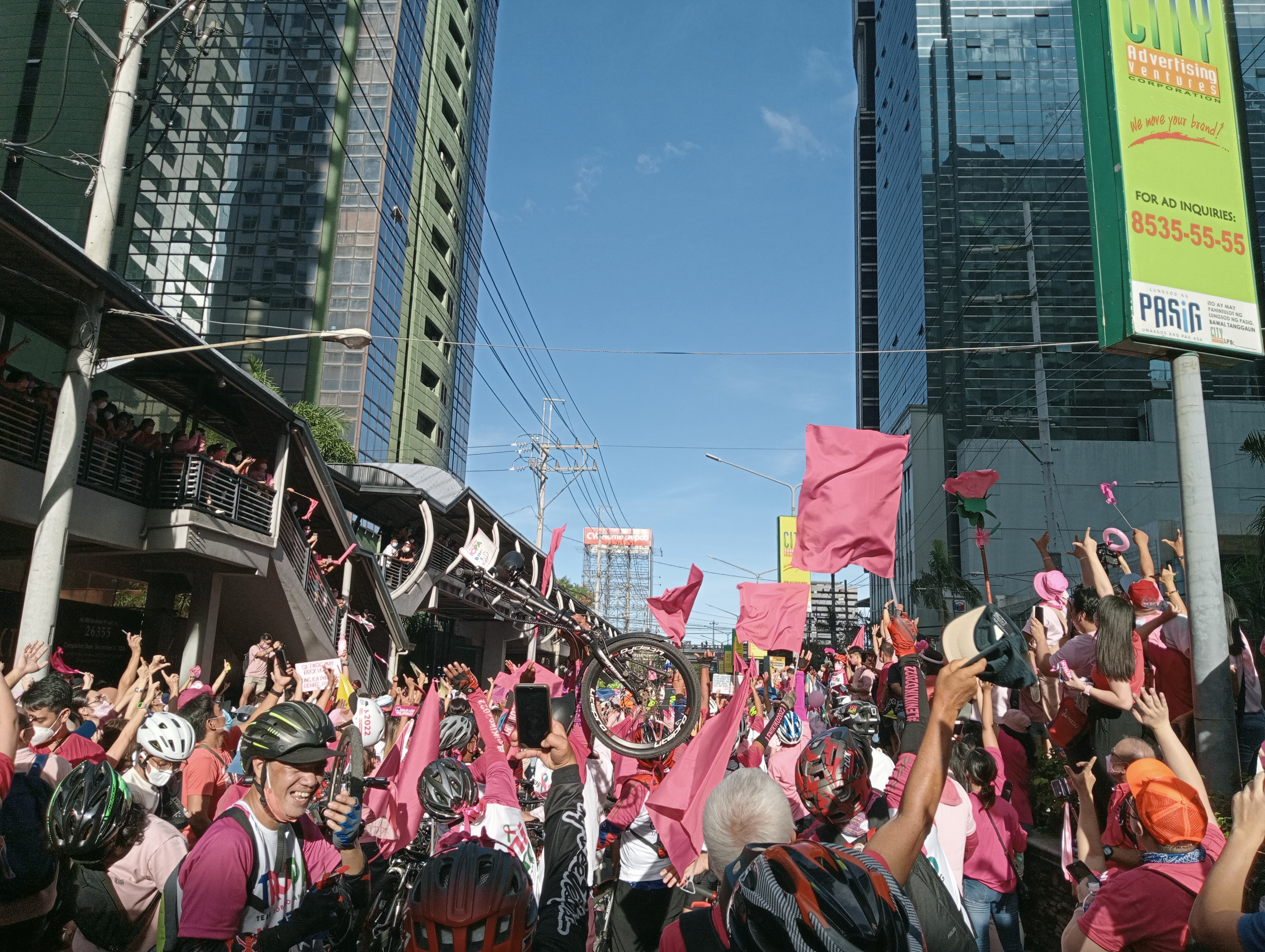
Doña Julia Vargas Avenue during the PasigLaban rally

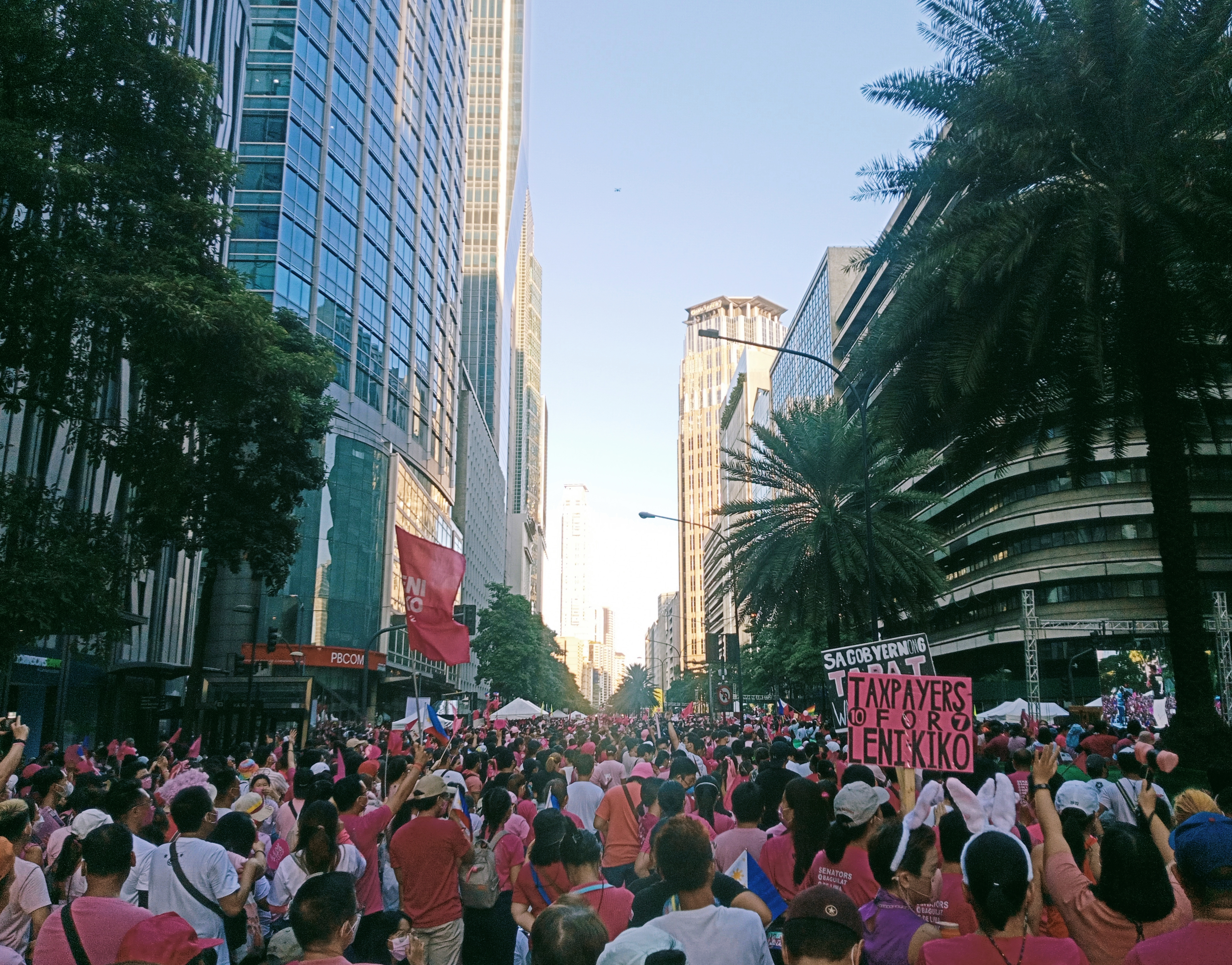
Miting de avance at Ayala Avenue, Makati

On October 24, 2021, Robredo campaign volunteers held a nationwide "caravan of hope." An estimated 10,000 supporters joined the caravan.

On February 8, 2022, Robredo held her proclamation rally in Plaza Quezon in her hometown, Naga City, Camarines Sur. The proclamation rally was attended by Robredo, Pangilinan, and their senatorial slate. Prior to the proclamation rally, her campaign held a mini-rally in Libmanan, Camarines Sur.

On February 13, 2022, Robredo and her supporters held a campaign rally at the Quezon Memorial Circle in Quezon City. The rally, dubbed "Pink Sunday," was attended by at least 20,000 supporters. Due to the sheer number of supporters, the event resulted in a spillover crowd that violated several safety protocols set by the local government. Robredo's camp later apologized for the incident.

After the Pink Sunday rally, Robredo campaigned in the provinces of Capiz and Aklan. The following week, Robredo began her campaign in Mindanao with a rally and caravan in Iligan. Meanwhile, Pangilinan campaigned in Tarlac with his wife, Sharon Cuneta. On February 25, Robredo campaigned in Iloilo, with an estimated crowd of 40,000 joining her at the Iloilo Sports Complex. On March 2, Robredo campaigned in Manila, which was followed by a sortie in Cavite on March 4.

On March 20, Robredo's campaign held a rally at Ortigas Center in Pasig, dubbed the "PasigLaban grand rally", which became her largest rally at that point. Organizers estimated that 180,000 attended, although the local police countered this with its own estimate placed at 137,000. This hitherto record turnout was later surpassed by the April 9 rally dubbed as "Manalakáran: Pampanga People's Rally" in San Fernando, which drew about 220,000. Regional police officials at first denied the organizers' estimate, saying that the venue could only accommodate 70,000 people; later, however, regional police director Matthew Baccay clarified that their 70,000 figure was for security planning purposes only and not meant to indicate audience size.

On April 23, Robredo celebrated her 57th birthday at a rally, labeled as a street party by media outlets, along Macapagal Boulevard in Pasay. According to the organizers, they estimated the crowd to have been of 412,000 people, making it the campaign's largest rally at this point. The National Capital Region Police Office contested the estimate, however, stating that only around 70,000 to 80,000 people attended.

Finally, Robredo held her miting de avance in Makati, which drew 780,000 people, making it the campaign's biggest rally, surging ahead of the Pasay rally's crowd of 412,000.

Locations where Robredo held campaign rallies outside of Metro Manila during her 2022 presidential campaign.
Locations where Robredo held campaign rallies during her 2022 presidential campaign throughout Metro Manila.

List of Robredo's campaign rallies
Date	Venue	City/Municipality	Province	Estimated attendance (Note: If available, the estimated attendance figures are that of third-party authorities, such as the Philippine National Police.)	Ref.
Feb 8	Plaza Quezon	Naga	Camarines Sur	20,000	
Feb 9	Central Mall Plaza Grounds	Daet	Camarines Norte		
Feb 9	Sorsogon Provincial Capitol	Sorsogon City	Sorsogon		
Feb 9	Guinobatan Municipal Hall	Guinobatan	Albay		
Feb 13	Quezon Memorial Circle	Quezon City	–	20,000	
Feb 15	Dinggoy Roxas Civic Center	Roxas	Capiz	4,000	
Feb 15	Aklan Catholic College	Kalibo	Aklan	5,000	
Feb 16	Evelio B. Javier Freedom Park	San Jose de Buenavista	Antique	6,000	
Feb 22	Iligan City Public Plaza	Iligan	Lanao del Norte	3,000	
Feb 22	Plaza Divisoria	Cagayan de Oro	Misamis Oriental	10,000	
Feb 23	Diocesan Formation Center	Malaybalay	Bukidnon		
Feb 24	Southwestern University	Cebu City	Cebu	12,000	
Feb 25	Iloilo Sports Complex	Iloilo City	Iloilo	40,000	
Feb 26	Guimaras Provincial Capitol Gym	Jordan	Guimaras	2,000	
Mar 2	Plaza Noli	Manila	–	5,000	
Mar 3	Divine Word College	Calapan	Oriental Mindoro	7,000	
Mar 4	General Trias Sports Park	General Trias	Cavite	47,000	
Mar 5	New Malolos City Hall Grounds	Malolos	Bulacan	45,000	
Mar 8	Bislig City Cultural & Sports Center	Bislig	Surigao del Sur		
Mar 8	Hotel Tavern Compound	Surigao City	Surigao del Norte		
Mar 9	Agusan del Sur College	Bayugan	Agusan del Sur	2,000	
Mar 9	Guingona Park	Butuan	Agusan del Norte	10,000	
Mar 10	Odiongan Public Plaza	Odiongan	Romblon	3,000	
Mar 11	Paglaum Sports Complex	Bacolod	Negros Occidental	86,000	
Mar 12	Alcala Municipal Grounds	Alcala	Cagayan		
Mar 12	Echague Banchetto	Echague	Isabela	10,000	
Mar 15	Kidapawan City Hall	Kidapawan	Cotabato	1,000	
Mar 15	Rizal Park	Koronadal	South Cotabato	2,000	
Mar 15	Carlos P. Garcia Freedom Park	General Santos	South Cotabato	14,000	
Mar 16	Cotabato State University	Cotabato City	Maguindanao del Norte	3,000	
Mar 16	Isabela City Plaza	Isabela City	Basilan	45,000	
Mar 17	Sindangan Cultural and Sports Center	Sindangan	Zamboanga del Norte	15,000	
Mar 17	Cesar C. Climaco Freedom Park	Zamboanga City	Zamboanga del Sur	35,000	
Mar 18	Plaza Luz	Pagadian	Zamboanga del Sur	4,000	
Mar 20	Emerald Avenue	Pasig	–	137,000	
Mar 22	Old Provincial Capitol Grandstand	Cabanatuan	Nueva Ecija	50,000	
Mar 23	Ninoy Aquino Boulevard	Tarlac City	Tarlac	50,000	
Mar 24	Davao del Sur Coliseum	Digos	Davao del Sur	6,000	
Mar 26	Notre Dame Open Field	Caloocan	–	50,000	
Mar 28	Samar Capitol Grounds	Catbalogan	Samar	5,000	
Mar 28	University of Eastern Philippines	Catarman	Northern Samar	73,000	
Mar 29	Boy Scout Monument	Palo	Leyte	5,000	
Mar 29	Naval Gymnasium	Naval	Biliran		
Mar 29	Baybay Boulevard	Borongan	Eastern Samar	54,000	
Mar 30	Capitol Sunken Garden	Maasin	Southern Leyte		
Mar 31	Longest Boardwalk	Kauswagan	Lanao del Norte		
Apr 1	Sagonsongan Area 6 Open Court	Marawi	Lanao del Sur	5,000	
Apr 1	Tagbilaran Airport	Tagbilaran	Bohol	80,000	
Apr 5	Rizal Capitol Grounds	Antipolo	Rizal	43,000	
Apr 6	San Jose Municipal Plaza	San Jose	Occidental Mindoro		
Apr 6	Puerto Princesa Baywalk	Puerto Princesa	Palawan	11,000	
Apr 7	New Tagum City Hall Grounds	Tagum	Davao del Norte	35,000	
Apr 8	CSI Stadia Grounds	Dagupan	Pangasinan	76,000	
Apr 9	Baler Municipal Plaza	Baler	Aurora		
Apr 9	Robinsons Starmills	San Fernando	Pampanga	220,000	
Apr 12	Saint Louis College	San Fernando	La Union	11,000	
Apr 12	Virac Town Center Metrowalk	Virac	Catanduanes	15,000	
Apr 13	J. M. Robredo Boulevard	Masbate City	Masbate	40,000	
Apr 18	Infanta Government Service Complex	Infanta	Quezon		
Apr 18	Boac Sports Arena	Boac	Marinduque		
Apr 19	SM City Olongapo Downtown	Olongapo	Zambales		
Apr 19	Sitio Maluang Open Field	Balanga	Bataan	65,000	
Apr 20	Pasayaw Grounds	Canlaon	Negros Oriental		
Apr 20	Queengate Center	Larena	Siquijor		
Apr 20	Rusi Ballfield	Dumaguete	Negros Oriental	40,000	
Apr 21	Parkmall	Mandaue	Cebu	150,000	
Apr 23	Macapagal Boulevard	Pasay	–	80,000-412,000	
Apr 25	Gapan City Plaza	Gapan	Nueva Ecija		
Apr 26	Plaza de Francisco M. Sanchez	Lubang	Occidental Mindoro		
Apr 27	Bulacan Sports Complex	Malolos	Bulacan	144,000	
Apr 28	Lucena City Government Complex	Lucena	Quezon	80,000	
Apr 29	Nuvali Open Field	Santa Rosa	Laguna	225,000	
Apr 30	Catalina Lake Residences Open Lot	Bauan	Batangas	280,000	
May 1	City of Dasmariñas Football Field	Dasmariñas	Cavite	100,000	
May 2	Melvin Jones Grandstand	Baguio	Benguet	30,000	
May 3	La Paz Plaza	Iloilo City	Iloilo	6,000	
May 3	Bantayan Park	Bago	Negros Occidental	15,000	
May 4	Pantao Ragat Central School	Pantao Ragat	Lanao del Norte		
May 4	Dipolog Boulevard	Dipolog	Zamboanga del Norte	45,000	
May 5	Provincial Farmers' Cultural and Training Center	Oroquieta	Misamis Occidental		
May 5	Misamis University	Ozamiz	Misamis Occidental		
May 5	Datu Lipus Makapandong Cultural Center	Prosperidad	Agusan del Sur	70,000	
May 6	Magsaysay and Rizal Streets	Sorsogon City	Sorsogon	40,000	
May 6	Sawangan Park	Legazpi	Albay	100,000	
May 6	Magsaysay Avenue	Naga	Camarines Sur	306,000	
May 7	Ayala and Makati Avenues	Makati	–	780,000	

== Polling ==
Graphical summary

Opinion polls conducted before the filing of candidacies showed Robredo garnering about 5 to 10 percentage points of voting intentions. Her numbers significantly improved by late 2021, after the filing of candidacies. A survey conducted by Pulse Asia on December 1–6 showed Robredo polling ahead of other presidential candidates but behind Bongbong Marcos, garnering 20 percent, 12 percentage points more than the pollster's previous survey conducted during the pre-filing period, specifically from September 6–11. Surveys conducted by OCTA Research and Publicus Asia during the same period showed Robredo polling 14 and 20.2 percent respectively.

In early 2022, Robredo consistently ranked second behind frontrunner Marcos, garnering about 15 to 20 percent of voting intentions. After the CNN presidential debate and the first PiliPinas Debates 2022, Robredo's numbers rose. A poll conducted by Pulse Asia on March 17–21 showed Robredo polling at 24 percentage points, nine points more than in the pollster's previous survey conducted at the start of the campaign period (February 18–23). This was corroborated by the Publicus Asia poll conducted on March 30 – April 6, with Robredo garnering 23 percentage points. Another poll by Laylo conducted on the same period showed Robredo at 19 percentage points.

== Candidates ==
Team Robredo-Pangilinan
Leni Robredo	Francis Pangilinan
for President	for Vice President
Vice President of the Philippines (2016–2022)	Senator of the Philippines (2016–2022)
Candidates: Leni Robredo for President; Francis Pangilinan for Vice President; Teddy Baguilat for Senator; Leila de Lima for Senator; Chel Diokno for Senator; Risa Hontiveros for Senator; Alex Lacson for Senator; Sonny Matula for Senator; Antonio Trillanes for Senator; Jejomar Binay for Senator; Francis Escudero for Senator; Dick Gordon for Senator; Joel Villanueva for Senator

== Senatorial slate ==
Robredo and Pangilinan endorsed the following candidates for the 2022 Philippine Senate election, thus forming the tandem's "senatorial slate" referred to as "Team Robredo–Pangilinan":

- Former representative Teddy Baguilat (Liberal)
- Senator Leila de Lima (Liberal)
- Lawyer Chel Diokno (Katipunan ng Nagkakaisang Pilipino)
- Senator Risa Hontiveros (Akbayan)
- Lawyer Alex Lacson (Ang Kapatiran)
- Lawyer Sonny Matula (Independent)
- Former senator Antonio Trillanes (Liberal)
- Guest candidates:
  - Former vice president Jejomar Binay (UNA)
  - Sorsogon governor Francis Escudero (NPC)
  - Senator Dick Gordon (Bagumbayan–VNP)
  - Senator Joel Villanueva (Independent)

Senate Majority Leader Migz Zubiri was initially included in the senatorial slate as a guest candidate. However, Zubiri later endorsed the presidential campaign of Bongbong Marcos, contrary to an agreement made with all guest candidates not to openly endorse a presidential candidate. Prompted by calls from their supporters to remove him from the slate, campaign spokesperson Barry Gutierrez confirmed on April 27, 2022, that Zubiri was no longer part of their slate, continuing their campaign with only 11 senatorial candidates fielded.

== Endorsements ==
After her bid was announced, Robredo received support from Filipino netizens in various social media platforms; the hashtags #LetLeniLead and #LabanLeni2022 trended on social media. Various personalities publicly expressed their support for Robredo. She also received endorsements from several politicians, particularly those aligned with the opposition.

Fellow presidential aspirant and incumbent senator Panfilo Lacson questioned Robredo's character after some of her campaign staff allegedly became amenable to dropping her running mate, Kiko Pangilinan, and fielding instead his running mate, Senator Tito Sotto, as Robredo's running mate, allegedly in exchange for more votes in some provinces. Robredo's spokesperson Barry Gutierrez debunked Lacson's allegations and reiterated that "Robredo has always been clear from the start that she will only campaign for her running mate, Pangilinan". However, during her 57th birthday, Robredo flew without Pangilinan all the way to the Moro Islamic Liberation Front's (MILF) headquarters in Camp Darapanan in Sultan Kudarat, Maguindanao del Norte, during the official announcement of an endorsement by MILF chairman and Bangsamoro Interim Chief Minister Murad Ebrahim who also chairs the United Bangsamoro Justice Party (UBJP); the MILF and UBJP had yet to endorse a vice presidential candidate at that point. Later, while MILF and UBJP endorsed Robredo for president, the two groups eventually endorsed Davao City mayor Sara Duterte for vice president instead of Pangilinan. Earlier, Robredo also proceeded with her 2-day campaign in the island of Samar, despite Pangilinan skipping the campaign rally in Eastern Samar after he was informed by their campaign team that local officials in Eastern Samar wanted only to endorse Robredo and not his candidacy. However, during these trips to endorsing parties without Pangilinan alongside her, Robredo did not campaign for the endorsing parties' chosen vice presidential candidates.

== Political positions ==
=== Abortion ===
Robredo is not in favor of abortion, citing her faith as a Catholic. However, she is open to talks of decriminalization, at least in certain cases.

=== Divorce ===
Robredo does not support divorce, asserting that annulment in the country should be made more accessible first. She said women are often unable to leave their marriages because they are financially dependent on their husbands, and economic empowerment can help them become capable of walking away from abuses. She has, however, stated her openness to hear "divergent opinions" regarding abortion, divorce, and death penalty.

=== Education ===
Robredo has criticized the quality of education in the country, citing it as the cause for unemployment. On November 4, 2021, she released her "Kalayaan sa COVID" (Freedom from COVID) plan, a portion of which was dedicated to education, "Kalayaan sa kakulangan sa education" (Freedom from lack of education). This included the reopening of face-to-face classes in low-risk areas, giving gadgets to students in high-risk areas, ensuring free access to quality education materials on the Internet, and establishing "community learning hubs" where students without Internet access and electronic devices can borrow such. In the plan, she would allocate ₱68 billion (about US$1.3 billion) in education aid for 22 million students, with each being given ₱300 (about $6). She also planned to raise the education budget to 6 percent of the country's GDP once elected. She also said she would declare an "education crisis" if she assumes office, so that the government can adopt an "all-hands-on-deck approach" to education.

=== Economy ===
On December 11, 2021, Robredo's campaign team released her "Hanapbuhay para sa lahat" (Livelihood for all) plan, detailing her agenda to revive industries, provide stable employment, and ensure the protection of workers' rights and improvement of labor conditions. She planned to develop the country's marine, manufacturing, climate, and technological industries. She also planned to modernize the agriculture sector and support the micro, small, and medium-sized enterprises (MSME) sector. During the first PiliPinas Debates 2022, she re-emphasized her support for MSMEs and vowed to make a ₱100 billion (about $1.9 billion) stimulus package for small businesses.

=== Foreign policy ===
Robredo had called for the government to reassert its sovereign rights in the South China Sea (West Philippine Sea) amid the territorial dispute between China and various nations in Southeast Asia. She vowed to continue the full modernization of the armed forces and build a credible defense around the country's waters. She also pushed for multilateral talks in settling the maritime dispute with China. During a meeting with the Rotary Club of Manila on October 14, 2021, Robredo declared that she would only enter any deal with the government of China regarding the territorial disputes such as joint explorations if China recognizes the Permanent Court of Arbitration's 2016 ruling favoring the Philippines. She later clarified that her administration is nevertheless willing to cooperate with China on other policy areas, particularly trade and investment.

=== Health ===
Robredo's "Kalayaan sa COVID" (Freedom from COVID) platform planned to address the ongoing COVID-19 pandemic. Major components of the plan included the implementation of the universal health care law, reform of the Philippine Health Insurance Corporation (PhilHealth), reducing the members of the Inter-Agency Task Force for the Management of Emerging Infectious Diseases, expanding health workers' benefits, and strengthening local health units. Robredo also supports efforts to boost testing and vaccination to withstand another COVID-19 surge.

=== Infrastructure ===
Robredo expressed support for the Build! Build! Build! infrastructure program of the Duterte administration. She vowed to continue the program, but said she will prioritize public–private partnerships (PPPs) instead of official development assistance (ODA) aids. She also said that her proposed infrastructure projects would be under one program.

=== LGBT issues ===
In a campaign rally, Robredo committed to protect LGBT rights. She supports same-sex civil unions, but iterated that she is against same-sex marriage.
