= Opinion polling for the 2022 Philippine presidential election =

Surveys held prior to the 2022 Philippine presidential elections

This article covers opinion polling for the 2022 Philippine presidential and vice presidential elections. Opinion polling in Philippines is conducted by Social Weather Stations (SWS), Pulse Asia, RP-Mission and Development Foundation Inc. (RPMD), OCTA Research, and other pollsters. Poll results are listed in the table below in reverse chronological order. The front-runner is in bold. Those that are within the margin of error are in italics.

== Calendar ==
- Filing of candidacies: October 1 to 8, 2021
- Deadline in substituting a candidate for it to appear on the ballot: November 15, 2021
- Campaign period for nationally elected positions: February 8 to May 7, 2022
- Campaign period for locally elected positions: March 25 to May 7, 2022
- Election day: May 9, 2022

== Polling for president ==
=== From the start of the campaign period to Election Day ===
Fieldwork date(s)	Pollster	Sample size	MoE	Abella Ind.	De Guzman PLM	Gonzales PDSP	Lacson Ind. (Note: Originally ran under Partido para sa Demokratikong Reporma; resigned from the party mid-way through the campaign. Still labeled as a Reporma candidate on the official ballots.)	Mangondato Katipunan	Marcos PFP	Montemayor DPP	Moreno Aksyon	Pacquiao PROMDI	Robredo Ind.	Others	Und./ None	Ref.
May 9	Election results	56,097,722	N/A	0.21	0.17	0.17	1.66	0.56	58.77	0.11	3.59	6.81	27.94	N/A		
Exit poll	Publicus Asia	29,024		—	—	—	3	—	58	—	6	7	25	1	—	—
May 2–5	Publicus Asia	1,500	±3.0%	1	2	1	4	—	54	—	8	2	22	0	6 / 0	—
Apr 22–30	Mobilis–TruthWatch	2,400	±2%	—	—	—	2	—	55	—	3	5	32	1	—	—
Apr 22–25	OCTA	2,400	±2%	—	0.2	0.2	2	1	58	—	8	5	25	—	0.1 / 0.04	0.3
Apr 19–21	Publicus Asia	1,500	±3.0%	1	2	0	4	—	57	—	6	2	21	0	6 / 0	—
Apr 16–21	Pulse Asia	2,400	±2.0%	1	0.3	0.1	2	1	56	0.1	4	7	23	—	— / 1	5
Apr 14–20	Laylo	3,000	±2.0%	—	—	—	2	—	64	—	5	5	21	0.4	3 / —	—
Apr 18–19	MBC–DZRH	7,560	±1.13%	0.1	0.2	0.1	3.6	0.6	52.9	0.3	8.2	5.8	24.3	—	3.9 / —	—
Apr 4–15	I&AC	2,440	±3.0%	0.375	1	0.125	5	0.375	55	0.125	11.75	6.5	18.5	—	1.25 / —	—
Apr 2–6	OCTA	1,200	±3%	1	0.1	0.001	4	0.1	57	—	9	7	22	—	0.5 / 0.008	—
Mar 30–Apr 6	Publicus Asia	1,500	±3.0%	1	0	0	4	—	56	—	9	2	23	0	5 / 1	—
Apr 1–4	RMN–APCORE	2,400	±2.0%	—	—	—	1.8	—	59	—	8.3	4.2	20.7	<1	5.5 / —	—
April 3				Second COMELEC presidential debate												
March 24				Lacson resigns from Partido Reporma; Reporma switches endorsement from Lacson to Robredo												
Mar 22–Apr 1	Mobilis–TruthWatch	2,505	±3%	—	—	—	2	—	52	—	10	4	30	—	2 / —	—
Mar 15–22	Laylo	3,000	±2.0%	—	—	—	2	—	61	—	9	6	19	—	2 / —	—
Mar 15–22	RP-MDF	10,000	±1.0%	—	—	—	7	—	53	—	9	2	28	—	1 / —	—
March 21				PDP–Laban endorses Marcos												
Mar 17–21	Pulse Asia	2,400	±2.0%	0.1	0.02	0	2	1	56	0.05	8	6	24	—	1 / 1	0.5
March 19				First COMELEC presidential debate												
Mar 9–14	Publicus Asia	1,500	±3.0%	0.5	0.7	0.3	4.2	—	55.1	—	8.2	1.8	21	0.1	7.9 / 0.3	—
Mar 7–13	I&AC	1,800	±3.0%	0.5	1	0.25	7.75	0.25	51.25	0.25	10.25	4.5	20.75	—	3.25 / —	—
Mar 12	MBC–DZRH	7,566	±1.13%	0.2	0.5	0.2	4.7	1.2	49.8	0.3	9.8	8	21.4	—	3.9 / —	—
Mar 2–5	RMN–APCORE	2,400	±2.0%	—	—	—	3	—	55	—	12	5	18	2	6 / —	—
February 27				CNN Philippines presidential debate												
Feb 22–28	RP-MDF	10,000	±1.0%	—	—	—	4	—	53	—	11	5	25	—	2 / —	—
Feb 18–23	Pulse Asia	2,400	±2.0%	0	0.1	0	2	0.4	60	0.01	10	8	15	—	3 / 1	0.4
Feb 14–21	Laylo	3,000	±2.0%	—	—	—	3	—	63	—	7	7	17	—	3 / —	—
Feb 12–17	OCTA	1,200	±3.0%	—	—	—	3	—	55	—	11	10	15	—	5 / 0.3	1
Feb 11–16	Publicus Asia	1,500	±2.6%	0.5	0.7	—	3.3	—	52.3	—	8.9	2.7	22.3	0.1	8.9 / 0.5	—
February 15				SMNI presidential debate												
Feb 9–15	I&AC	1,200	±3.0%	0.25	1.13	—	8.75	0.13	53	0.25	11.25	6	16.75	—	2.5 / —	—

=== From the end of candidacy filing to the start of the campaign period ===
Fieldwork date(s)	Pollster	Sample size	MoE	Abella Ind.	De Guzman PLM	Gonzales PDSP	Lacson Reporma	Mangondato Katipunan	Marcos PFP	Montemayor DPP	Moreno Aksyon	Pacquiao PROMDI	Robredo Ind.	Others	Und./ None	Ref.
2022
Jan 28–31	SWS	1,200	±3.0%	0.04	0.3	0	6	0.04	**50**	0.1	11	11	19	—	3 / —	—
Jan 26–30	RMN–APCORE	2,400	±2.0%	0.3	0.2	0.2	3	—	**57**	—	12	4	17	—	6 / —	—
Jan 22–30	RP-MDF	10,000	±1.0%	0.34	—	—	8	—	**45.02**	—	16.25	9.71	20.06	—	—	—
Jan 10–26	Laylo	15,450	±0.8%	—	—	—	3	—	**64**	—	6	6	16	—	—	—
Jan 19–24	Pulse Asia	2,400	±2.0%	0.05	0.02	0	4	0.3	**60**	0	8	8	16	—	2 / 1	1
Jan 17–23	Laylo	3,000	±2%	—	—	—	4	—	**64**	—	7	7	16	—	3 / —	—
Jan 10–16	I&AC	2,400	±3%	0.25	1	0.25	8	—	**51**	—	14	10	11	—	3.5	—
2021
Dec 11–12	MBC–DZRH	7,614	±1.13%	—	0.3	—	4.9	—	**49.2**	—	10.4	8.2	16.2	6.3	4.5 / —	—
Dec 7–12	OCTA	1,200	±3.0%	0.02	0.001	—	5	—	**54**	—	12	10	14	—	1 / 4	0.1
Dec 6–12	I&AC	1,200	±3.0%	0.25	2	0.25	13	—	**43**	—	11	16	12	1	1.5 / —	—
Dec 6–10	Publicus Asia	1,500	±2.6%	0.5	—	—	3.4	—	**51.9**	—	7.9	2.3	20.2	3.9	8.3 / 0.9	—
Dec 1–6	Pulse Asia	2,400	±2.0%	—	0.004	0	6	—	**53**	—	8	8	20	0.01	3 / 1	1
November 30				Bong Go announces his withdrawal from the presidential election.												
Nov 23–29	RMN–APCORE	2,400	±3.0%	0.17	0.17	0.08	3	—	**55**	—	13	4	13	8	4 / —	—
Nov 16–24	RP-MDF	10,000	±2.0%	0.1	—	—	6.35	—	**23.94**	—	21.75	15.94	15.1	14.25	2.56	
Nov 16–20	I&AC	1,200	±3.0%	0.25	0.875	0.125	12	—	**36.5**	—	10.75	16.75	13	8.25	1.5 / —	—
November 9–15				Ronald dela Rosa withdraws; Bong Go substitutes for Grepor Belgica for president.												
Nov 16–18	Publicus Asia	1,500	±2.6%	0.4	0.3	—	2.9	—	**56.7**	—	6.9	3.0	15.4	4.3	8.8 / 1.5	—
Oct 17–26	RP-MDF	10,000	±2.0%	0.81	—	—	7.08	—	23.10	—	**25.39**	17.88	18.31	3.41	4.02	
Oct 20–23	SWS	1,200	±3.0%	—	—	—	5	—	**47**	—	13	9	18	5	3 / —	—
Oct 11–18	Publicus Asia	1,500	±2.6%	0.6	—	—	2.9	—	**49.3**	—	8.8	2.8	21.3	4	8.6 / 1.7	—
Sep 27–Oct 8	I&AC	2,400	±2.5%	—	3.25	1.25	12.5	—	**23.5**	—	18	19.75	14	7.75	—	—

=== Until candidacy filing ended in October 2021 ===
Fieldwork date(s)	Pollster	Sample size	MoE	Alvarez (Reporma)	Bello (Ind.)	Binay (UNA)	Carpio (Ind.)	Cayetano (NP)	Duterte (HNP)	Go (PDP–Laban)	Gordon (Ind.)	Lacson (Reporma)	Marcos (PFP)	Moreno (Aksyon)	Pacquiao (PROMDI)	Poe (Ind.)	Robredo (LP)	Teodoro (Lakas)	Trillanes (Magdalo)	Others	Und./ Ref.
2021
October 1–8				Filing of certificates of candidacies: Manny Pacquiao submits his presidential candidacy under the PROMDI banner.; Bongbong Marcos resigns from the Nacionalista Party and swears in as chairperson of PFP.; Leni Robredo submits her presidential candidacy as an independent.; Sara Duterte files her candidacy for mayor of Davao City.																	
Sep 6–11	Pulse Asia	2,400	±2.0%	—	0.1	—	—	4	20	3	—	6	15	13	12	9	8	0.1	1	0.3	7
Jul 24–31	MBC–DZRH	7,500	±1.13%	—	—	2.8	—	2.1	25.4	3.5	1	3.3	17.7	11.2	10	10	8.3	—	1.6	—	2.8
Jul 13–19	Publicus Asia	1,500	±2.6%	—	—	0.3	0.2	0.8	20.8	3.3	0.8	2.9	17.8	11.3	3.6	5.1	13.2	1	—	4.3	11.8
Jul 12–18	OCTA	1,200	±3.0%	—	—	2	0	5	28	4	1	2	13	11	10	10	5	—	1	3	6
Jun 7–16	Pulse Asia	2,400	±2.0%	0.1	—	2	0.3	2	28	3	0.3	4	13	14	8	10	6	0.1	2	0.1	8
Feb 22 – Mar 3	Pulse Asia	2,400	±2.0%	—	—	3	0.2	2	27	5	1	2	13	12	11	12	7	0.3	—	0.1	4
Jan 26 – Feb 1	OCTA	1,200	±3.0%	—	—	—	—	—	22	—	—	—	12	11	12	13	5	—	—	—	—
2020
Nov 23 – Dec 2	Pulse Asia	2,400	±2.0%	—	—	—	0.1	3	26	4	0.2	4	14	12	10	14	8	—	—	1	4

== Polling for vice president ==
=== From the start of the campaign period to Election Day ===
Fieldwork date(s)	Pollster	Sample size	MoE	Atienza PROMDI	Bello PLM	David DPP	Duterte Lakas	Lopez WPP	Ong Aksyon	Pangilinan LP	Serapio Katipunan	Sotto NPC	Others	Und./ None	Ref.
May 9	Election results	56,097,722	N/A	0.52	0.19	0.11	61.53	0.31	3.59	17.82	0.17	15.76	N/A		
Exit poll	Publicus Asia	29,024		—	—	—	67	—	4	16	—	11	2	—	—
May 2–5	Publicus Asia	1,500	±3.0%	1	1	—	59	—	9	16	—	9	0	4 / 1	—
Apr 22–30	Mobilis–TruthWatch	2,400	±2%	1	—	—	55	—	4	13	—	24	3	—	—
Apr 22–25	OCTA	2,400	±2.0%	1	0.03	—	56	0.1	4	16	0.001	22	—	0.5 / 0.7	0.1
Apr 19–21	Publicus Asia	1,500	±3.0%	1	1	—	59	—	8	15	—	9	—	6 / 1	—
Apr 16–21	Pulse Asia	2,400	±2.0%	0.5	0.4	0.1	55	1	3	16	0.3	18	—	— / 1	5
Apr 14–20	Laylo	3,000	±2.0%	1	—	—	62	—	4	12	—	18	0.4	3 / —	—
Apr 18–19	MBC–DZRH	7,560	±1.13%	1.1	0.2	0.2	54.2	0.4	6.6	15.1	0.5	16.9	—	4.8 / —	—
Apr 4–15	I&AC	2,440	±3.0%	2	0.375	0.5	50.5	0	9	8	0.125	27.5	—	2 / —	—
Apr 2–6	OCTA	1,200	±3.0%	0.7	0.1	0.02	57	0.1	7	12	0	23	—	0.4 / 0.001	0
Mar 30–Apr 6	Publicus Asia	1,500	±3.0%	1	1	—	58	—	9	15	—	11	—	6 / 1	—
Apr 1–4	RMN–APCORE	2,400	±2.0%	1	—	—	57.3	—	4.8	12.8	—	17.4	—	6 / —	—
Mar 22–Apr 1	Mobilis–TruthWatch	2,505	±3%	1	—	—	50	—	6	18	—	21	—	4 / —	—
Mar 15–22	Laylo	3,000	±2.0%	2	—	—	60	—	7	12	—	17	—	2 / —	—
Mar 15–22	RP-MDF	10,000	±1.0%	1	—	—	54	—	2	7	—	35	—	—	—
Mar 17–21	Pulse Asia	2,400	±2.0%	1	0.1	0.01	56	0.3	5	15	0.01	20	—	2 / 1	0.4
March 20				COMELEC vice presidential debate											
Mar 9–14	Publicus Asia	1,500	±3.0%	0.7	0.9	—	56.5	—	10.6	12.8	—	9.9	0.3	7.7 / 0.5	—
Mar 7–13	I&AC	1,800	±3.0%	2.5	0.5	1	48.75	0.25	10.75	8	0.25	25.25	—	2.75 / —	—
Mar 12	MBC–DZRH	7,566	±1.13%	1.2	0.3	0.5	51.8	0.5	7.7	14.2	0.7	17.9	—	5.1 / —	—
Mar 2–5	RMN–APCORE	2,400	±2.0%	1	—	—	53	—	6	12	—	19	2	7 / —	—
February 26				CNN Philippines vice presidential debate											
Feb 22–28	RP-MDF	10,000	±1.0%	1	—	—	58	—	4	7	—	29	—	1 / —	—
Feb 18–23	Pulse Asia	2,400	±2.0%	1	0.1	0	53	0.1	6	11	0.01	24	—	3 / 1	0.1
Feb 14–21	Laylo	3,000	±2.0%	3	—	—	60	—	4	11	—	19	—	3 / —	—
Feb 12–17	OCTA	1,200	±3.0%	1	0	0	43	0	7	10	0.1	33	—	4 / 1	2
Feb 11–16	Publicus Asia	1,500	±3.0%	1.3	0.2	—	53.5	—	12.6	13.7	—	9.2	0.1	8.6 / 0.8	—
Feb 9–15	I&AC	1,200	±3.0%	2	0.5	—	54	—	11	4	—	25	—	3.5 / —	—

=== From the end of candidacy filing to the start of the campaign period ===
Fieldwork date(s)	Pollster	Sample size	MoE	Atienza PROMDI	Bello PLM	David DPP	Duterte Lakas	Lopez WPP	Ong Aksyon	Pangilinan LP	Serapio Katipunan	Sotto NPC	Others	Und./ None	Ref.
2022
Jan 28–31	SWS	1,200	±3.0%	2	0.3	0.4	**44**	1	7	10	0.2	33	—	3 / —	—
Jan 26–30	RMN–APCORE	2,400	±2.0%	1.9	0.1	—	**45.3**	—	7.6	9.9	—	26	—	5 / —	—
Jan 22–30	RP-MDF	10,000	±1.0%	1.62	—	—	**52.05**	—	3.60	6.22	—	35.95	—	—	—
Jan 10–26	Laylo	15,450	±0.8%	1	—	—	**60**	—	5	9	—	19	1	4 / —	—
Jan 19–24	Pulse Asia	2,400	±2.0%	1	0.02	0.02	**50**	0.1	5	11	0.1	29	—	1 / 1	1
January 21				The Cusi faction of PDP–Laban endorses Duterte											
Jan 10–16	I&AC	2,400	±3.0%	3	1.5	—	**54**	—	6	9	—	25	—	2.5 / —	—
2021
Dec 11–12	MBC–DZRH	7,614	±1.13%	2.2	0.9	—	**50.5**	—	8.4	10.2	—	20.7	—	7.2 / —	—
Dec 7–12	OCTA	1,200	±3.0%	1	0.07	—	**50**	—	4	9	—	33	—	2 / 1	0
Dec 6–12	I&AC	1,200	±3.0%	5	1	—	36	—	4	8	—	**44**	—	2 / —	—
Dec 6–10	Publicus Asia	1,500	±2.6%	1.5	0.7	—	**54.8**	—	11.2	9.7	—	11	0.1	9.5 / 1.5	—
Dec 1–6	Pulse Asia	2,400	±2.0%	1	0.01	—	**45**	—	6	12	—	31	—	3 / 2	1
Nov 23–29	RMN–APCORE	2,400	±3.0%	2	0.08	—	**48**	—	9	11	—	25	—	5 / —	—
Nov 16–24	RPMD	10,000	±2.0%	2.11	—	—	**44.88**	—	6.96	11.34	—	33.2	—	1.5	
Nov 16–20	I&AC	1,200	±3.0%	3	1	—	30	—	10	11	—	**43**	—	2 / —	—
Nov 16–18	Publicus Asia	1,500	±2.6%	1.3	0.4	—	**54.4**	—	8.9	9	—	10.1	0.3	13.7 / 1.9	—
November 9–13				Sara Duterte resigns from HNP; swears in as chairperson of Lakas, substitutes Lyle Fernando Uy to run for vice president.											
Oct 17–26	RPMD	10,000	±2.0%	2.15	—	—	**33.11**	—	8.94	11.13	—	26.87	14.92	2.88	
Oct 20–23	SWS	1,200	±3.0%	3	—	—	25	—	13	13	—	**44**	—	2 / —	—
Oct 11–18	Publicus Asia	1,500	±2.6%	2.6	—	—	—	—	**19**	12.3	—	17.3	**25.6**	16.9 / 6.3	—
Sep 27–Oct 8	I&AC	2,400	±2.5%	8.5	—	—	—	—	8	18	—	**44**	21.5	—	—

=== Until candidacy filing ended in October 2021 ===
Fieldwork date(s)	Pollster	Sample size	Margin of error	Alvarez (Reporma)	Angara (LDP)	Cayetano (NP)	Diokno (LP)	R. Duterte (PDP–Laban)	S. Duterte (HNP)	Escudero (NPC)	Go (PDP–Laban)	Marcos (PFP)	Moreno (Aksyon)	Pacquiao (PROMDI)	Poe (Ind.)	Revillame (Ind.)	Sotto (NPC)	Teodoro (Lakas)	Trillanes (Magdalo)	Villar (NP)	Others	Und./ Ref.
2021
Sep 6–11	Pulse Asia	2,400	±2.0%	—	2	6	1	14	—	—	7	12	12	7	—	4	**25**	0.5	2	2	0.1	5
Jul 24–31	MBC–DZRH	7,500	±1.13%	—	1.5	5	—	**15.6**	10.5	5.3	4.9	10.8	10.5	6.5	10.8	—	9.3	0.6	—	2.5	4.1	—
Jul 12–18	OCTA	1,200	±3.0%	—	—	10	1	**18**	—	5	4	9	11	6	10	—	7	0	2	1	9	7
Jun 7–16	Pulse Asia	2,400	±2.0%	0.3	3	8	0.2	**18**	0.03	7	5	10	14	9	—	4	10	1	2	2	0.1	6
Feb 22 – Mar 3	Pulse Asia	2,400	±2.0%	—	3	7	1	—	15	7	9	11	**16**	15	—	—	11	0.5	—	3	0.1	4
Jan 26 – Feb 1	OCTA	1,200	—	—	—	—	—	—	**14**	—	—	—	11	11	10	—	—	—	—	—	—	—
2020
Nov 23 – Dec 2	Pulse Asia	2,400	±2.0%	—	2	5	2	—	16	6	9	11	**17**	11	—	—	14	—	—	2	1	4
