= PiliPinas Forum 2022 =

- Created by: COMELEC; KBP
- Country of origin: Philippines
- No. of episodes: 8

Production
- Running time: 60 minutes

Original release
- Network: Various
- Release: May 3 – May 6, 2022

Related
- PiliPinas Debates 2022

PiliPinas Forum 2022 is a televised interview series produced under the partnership of the Commission on Elections (COMELEC) and the Kapisanan ng mga Brodkaster ng Pilipinas (KBP). It is intended to feature candidates of 2022 Philippine presidential and vice presidential elections.

== Cast ==
=== Candidates ===
For president

- Ernesto Abella
- Leody de Guzman
- Norberto Gonzales
- Faisal Mangondato
- Jose Montemayor
- Manny Pacquiao

For vice president

- Walden Bello
- Rizalito David
- Manny Lopez
- Carlos Serapio
- Tito Sotto

=== Interviewers ===
- Karmina Constantino (ABS-CBN)
- Dan Andrew Cura (FEBC)
- Tony Velasquez (ABS-CBN)
- Bombo Elmar Acol (Bombo Radyo)
- Bombo Jane Buna (Bombo Radyo)
- Rico Hizon (CNN PH)
- Pia Hontiveros (CNN PH)
- Ricky Rosales (RMN)
- Pinky Webb (CNN PH)
- Dennis Antenor Jr. (MBC)
- Cesar Chavez (MBC)
- Deo Macalma (MBC)
- Angelo Palmones (MBC)
- Maricel Halili (TV5)
- Shawn Yao (TV5)
- Ed Lingao (TV5)
- Jay Taruc (TV5)

== Production ==
PiliPinas Forum 2022 was organized after the last two of the five planned debates of Commission on Elections (COMELEC) and Impact Hub's PiliPinas Debates 2022 was cancelled. PiliPinas Forum 2022 in contrast to PiliPinas Debates 2022 which was a series of debates broadcast live, will be a collection of pre-taped interviews involving candidates of the 2022 Philippine presidential and vice presidential elections with a three-member panel whose composition is sourced from a pool of interviewers provided by television and radio networks. The candidates were given until noon of April 29, 2022 to confirm their participation in the interviews.

== Broadcast ==
PiliPinas Forum 2022 will air from May 3 to May 6, 2022. The participating television and/or radio networks for the PiliPinas Forum 2022 are the Manila Broadcasting Company, Bombo Radyo Philippines, Radio Mindanao Network, ABS-CBN Corporation, TV5 Network Inc., CNN Philippines, Radyo Pilipino, Primax Broadcasting Network, and Vanguard Broadcasting. The order of airing by candidate will be determined through a drawing of lots. The order was announced on May 2, 2022.

No.	Candidate(s)	Main broadcaster (Note: As listed by COMELEC; Not a list specific television networks (channels) or radio stations. Excludes simulcast.)	Panelists (Note: Panelists came from the main broadcaster unless otherwise stated.)	Original release date
1	Norberto Gonzales	Bombo Radyo	Elmar Acol, Jane Buna, Rico Hizon (CNN)	May 3, 2022
2	Leody de Guzman / Walden Bello	ABS-CBN	Tony Velasquez, Karmina Constantino (TeleRadyo/ANC), Dan Andrew Cura (FEBC)	May 3, 2022
3	Faisal Mangondato / Carlos Serapio	TV5	Maricel Halili, Ed Lingao (TV5), Dennis Antenor Jr. (MBC)	May 4, 2022
4	Tito Sotto	Bombo Radyo	Elmar Acol, Jane Buna, Rico Hizon (CNN Philippines)	May 4, 2022
5	Manny Lopez	CNN Philippines	Pia Hontiveros, Pinky Webb (CNN Philippines), Ricky Rosales (RMN)	May 5, 2022
6	Ernesto Abella	TV5	Shawn Yao, Ed Lingao (TV5), Cesar Chavez (MBC)	May 5, 2022
7	Jose Montemayor Jr. / Rizalito David	MBC	Jay Taruc (TV5), Deo Macalma, Angelo Palmones	May 6, 2022
8	Manny Pacquiao	CNN Philippines	Pia Hontiveros, Pinky Webb (CNN Philippines), Ricky Rosales (RMN)	May 6, 2022
