= 2022 Philippine presidential debates =

Numerous organizations have held debates for the 2022 Philippine presidential and vice presidential elections. The Commission on Elections (COMELEC) will organize five debates, three of which are for the presidential candidates, and the other two for the vice presidential candidates. Candidates, though not required to participate in debates, are expected to attend as it presents them with massive exposure that does not count on the limits of the airtime that they are allowed to advertise on broadcast networks. The first COMELEC-organized presidential debate was held on March 19, 2022, while the vice presidential debate was held the following day.

Alongside the debates organized by COMELEC, other media organizations held debates for the two positions. A presidential debate, organized by Sonshine Media Network International (SMNI), took place on February 15 and was attended by four candidates. CNN Philippines held their own debate on February 27 and was attended by nine candidates. Another presidential debate, organized again by SMNI, was held on March 26. A vice presidential debate, organized by CNN Philippines, took place on February 26 with eight candidates participating.

== Debate list ==
Legend
P Participated A Absent NI Not invited

=== Presidential debates and forums ===
Date	Organizers	Media partners	Location	Moderators	Candidates										Ref.
Date	Organizers	Media partners	Location	Moderators	Abella Ind.	De Guzman PLM	Gonzales PDSP	Lacson Ind.	Mangondato Katipunan	Marcos PFP	Montemayor DPP	Moreno Aksyon	Pacquiao PROMDI	Robredo Ind.	Ref.
PiliPinas Debates 2022
Mar 19	COMELEC	Syndication	Sofitel Philippine Plaza Manila, Pasay	Luchi Cruz-Valdez	P	P	P	P	P	A	P	P	P	P	
Apr 3	COMELEC	Syndication	Sofitel Philippine Plaza Manila, Pasay	Ces Drilon	P	P	P	P	P	A	P	P	P	P	
May 1	COMELEC	N/A	Sofitel Philippine Plaza Manila, Pasay	N/A	Cancelled										
PiliPinas Forum 2022
May 3 – 6	COMELEC and KBP	KBP member networks	Various	Various	P	P	P	A	P	A	P	A	P	A	
Other debates and forums
Feb 4	KBP	KBP member networks	TV5 Media Center, Mandaluyong	Karen Davila and Rico Hizon	NI	P	NI	P	NI	A	NI	P	P	P	
Feb 15	SMNI	SMNI and The Manila Times	Okada Manila, Parañaque	Karen Jimeno	P	P	P	A	A	P	A	A	A	A	
Feb 27	CNN Philippines	CNN Philippines and BusinessMirror	University of Santo Tomas, Manila	Pia Hontiveros and Pinky Webb	P	P	P	P	P	A	P	P	P	P	
Mar 26	SMNI	SMNI and The Manila Times	Okada Manila, Parañaque	Karen Jimeno	P	P	P	A	A	P	P	A	A	A	

=== Vice presidential debates ===
Date	Organizers	Media partners	Location	Moderators	Candidates									Source
Date	Organizers	Media partners	Location	Moderators	Atienza PROMDI	Bello PLM	David DPP	Duterte Lakas	Lopez WPP	Ong Aksyon	Pangilinan LP	Serapio Katipunan	Sotto NPC	Source
PiliPinas Debates 2022
Mar 20	COMELEC	Syndication	Sofitel Philippine Plaza Manila, Pasay	Ruth Cabal	A	P	P	A	P	P	P	P	P	
Apr 30	COMELEC	N/A	Sofitel Philippine Plaza Manila, Pasay	N/A	Cancelled									
PiliPinas Forum 2022
May 3 – 6	COMELEC and KBP	KBP member networks	Various	Various	A	P	P	A	P	A	A	P	P	
Other debates
Feb 22	SMNI	SMNI and The Manila Times	Okada Manila, Parañaque	Karen Jimeno	Cancelled									
Feb 26	CNN Philippines	CNN Philippines and BusinessMirror	University of Santo Tomas, Manila	Ruth Cabal and Rico Hizon	A	P	P	A	P	P	P	P	P	

== PiliPinas Debates 2022 ==
PiliPinas Debates 2022 is the debate series organized by COMELEC. The first presidential debate was held on March 19, 2022, while the first vice presidential debate was held on March 20, 2022.

Candidates will be following safety protocols stated by Inter-Agency Task Force for the Management of Emerging Infectious Diseases (IATF-EID) with no audience participation due to the risks of the ongoing COVID-19 pandemic. The electoral commission will organize the debates themselves, a deviation from 2016, where they let media organizations organize them.

== Third-party debates ==
Other organizations can hold third-party debates and the COMELEC can accredit these debates. The commission released guidelines and rules for debate accreditation on February 23.

=== February 15: First SMNI debate ===
Sonshine Media Network International (SMNI) organized a debate at the Okada Manila in Parañaque. The participants were Abella, de Guzman, Gonzales, and Marcos. The debate was not attended by several candidates, citing several reasons for their absence. Lacson declined due to Quiboloy's endorsement of Marcos. Pacquiao declined to participate due to the indictment of Apollo Quiboloy, leader of the Kingdom of Jesus Christ which is affiliated with SMNI, allegedly for sex trafficking by the United States government. Moreno and Robredo cited scheduling conflicts and prior commitments for their non-attendance. The debate featured a 4-person panel headlined by Clarita Carlos, a professor of political science at the University of the Philippines. The topics addressed were foreign policy, the disclosure of Statement of Assets, Liabilities, and Net Worth (SALN) to the public, the country's education system, the candidates' stance on the Communist Party of the Philippines and its ongoing rebellion, and other key issues. The debate was livestreamed and garnered 2.5 million views in YouTube and 2.1 million views in Facebook.

=== February 26: CNN Philippines vice presidential debate ===
On February 26, CNN Philippines held a debate in Manila, preceding their presidential debate on the same location. Seven candidates participated in the debate; Atienza was not able to participate as he was undergoing surgery, while Duterte declined to participate. The debate was moderated by journalists Ruth Cabal and Rico Hizon. The debate discussed the candidates' plans for pandemics, corruption, and other key domestic and foreign issues. Vice presidential candidate Bello notably attacked the Marcos/Duterte tandem for their non-attendance in debates and criticized fellow aspirant Sotto for being allied with the current administration. After interrupting other candidates, an action that was against debate rules, his microphone was temporarily turned off.

=== February 27: CNN Philippines presidential debate ===
CNN Philippines organized a debate at the Quadricentennial Pavilion of the University of Santo Tomas in Manila, moderated by journalists Pia Hontiveros and Pinky Webb. The debate was attended by all candidates except for Marcos, who cited prior commitments. There was no live audience, and each candidate spoke in front of a podium. Segments were dedicated to the candidates' plans and proposals regarding solving corruption in the country, development of infrastructure, foreign policy, and other issues, alongside addressing some of the controversies associated with the candidates. Mid-way throughout the debate, the network's website was targeted by a DDoS attack. After the debate, the performances of Lacson and Robredo were praised online, while Pacquiao was criticized for his stance on the LGBT.

=== March 26: Second SMNI debate ===
SMNI will hold a second presidential debate on March 26. The network originally planned to hold a vice presidential debate on February 22 but cancelled it and replaced it with a second presidential debate.
