= PiliPinas Debates 2022 =

Series of presidential debates in the Philippines

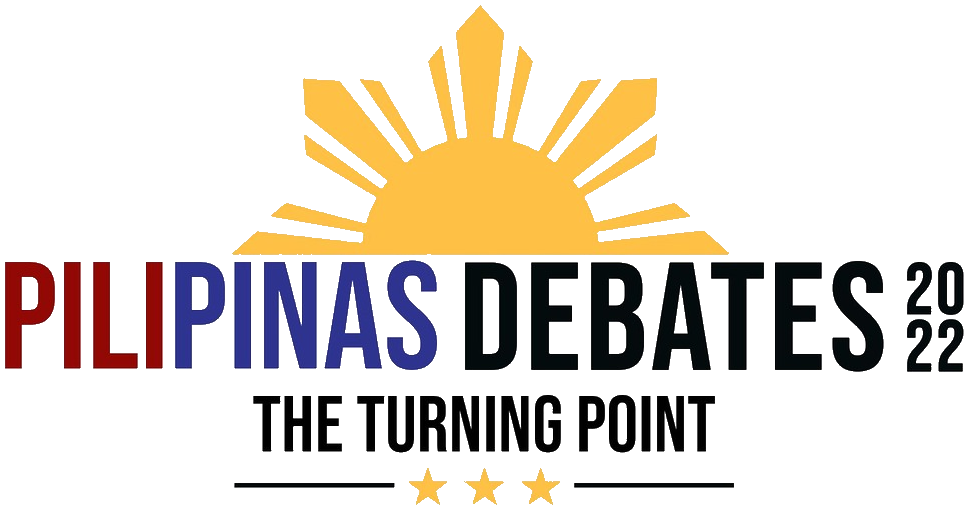
- Created by: COMELEC
- Presented by: Various
- Country of origin: Philippines
- No. of episodes: 3

Production
- Producer: Vote Pilipinas
- Production locations: Sofitel Hotel Tent, Pasay
- Production company: Impact Hub Manila

Original release
- Network: Syndication (see broadcast)
- Release: March 19 – April 3, 2022

Related
- PiliPinas Debates 2016; PiliPinas Forum 2022

PiliPinas Debates 2022: The Turning Point, or simply PiliPinas Debates 2022, was a televised debate series organized by the Commission on Elections (COMELEC), with the assistance of non-partisan voter education organization Vote Pilipinas as part of the debates for the 2022 Philippine presidential and vice presidential elections.

The commission, under the law, cannot mandate candidates to join debates though the commission does expect candidates to attend debates that the commission themselves organize, as it presents them with massive exposure, and that it is not counted on the limits of the airtime that they are allowed to advertise on broadcast networks.

Unlike the debates in the 2016 elections, three presidential debates and two vice presidential debates were planned to be held. However, the April 23 & 24 debates were postponed to April 30 and May 1 respectively until it was eventually cancelled, thus prematurely ending the debates. The debates were replaced by the PiliPinas Forum 2022, a televised interview series.

== Background ==
On November 11, 2021, amid preparations for the 2022 elections, the Commission on Elections (COMELEC) confirmed that they will organize debates for both candidates running for president and vice-president by January 2022. Unlike the debates from 2016, where they let media organizations organize the official debates, the commission will organize the debates themselves. They earlier planned to hold seven debates: three debates each per position and a primary debate, as a teaser for the upcoming debates series. By January 2022, the COMELEC said they might forego with the teaser debates, as the number of candidates have been reduced to a more manageable number.

COMELEC partnered with Impact Hub Manila for the production of PiliPinas Debates 2022. Impact Hub Manila also organized the Vote Pilipinas campaign with COMELEC, which aimed to provide non-partisan comprehensive information on candidates. The COMELEC signed a formal agreement with Vote Pilipinas on March 7, 2022. The debates were held at the Sofitel Hotel Tent in Pasay.

A total of five debates were planned, however only three were held. This is due to Impact Hub's inability to pay ₱14 million, or 68.4 percent of its ₱20.6-million contract with hotel operator Sofitel. The cancelled debates were supposed to be held on April 23 and 24 before they were postponed to April 30 and May 1. COMELEC, along with its new partner, the Kapisanan ng mga Brodkaster ng Pilipinas organized the PiliPinas Forum 2022, an interview series with the candidates, in its place.

== Format ==
The commission stated that the debates were to focus on the candidates' platforms and plans. Each debate had a set of predetermined topics, while the questions were obtained from sector groups. While candidates were informed of the topics to be addressed by the debates, they were not given questions in advance nor allowed to bring prepared notes, although they were allowed to take notes on the other candidates during the debate. The venue had ten podiums for the presidential debates regardless of actual attendance.

The first three debates were moderated by one person and lasted for three hours. Candidates drew lots to determine who would answer the first question, while the following questions were answered by candidates in alphabetical order. Each candidate was given one minute and a half to speak, although the second debate extended this by 30 seconds. The last two back-to-back debates were supposed to be held in a town hall format, with two moderators and a post-debate roundtable.

Candidates followed safety protocols stated by Inter-Agency Task Force for the Management of Emerging Infectious Diseases (IATF). The debates had no audience participation due to the risks of the ongoing COVID-19 pandemic; the last two debates were supposed to feature both remote and in-person audiences.

== Summary ==
Date	Moderator(s)	Topics
Presidential debates
March 19	Luchi Cruz-Valdes	Economy and COVID-19 pandemic
April 3	Ces Drilon	Government accountability, domestic policy and foreign relations
April 30	Cancelled	
Vice presidential debates
March 20	Ruth Cabal	Government accountability and domestic policy
May 1	Cancelled	

== Debates ==
=== March 19 presidential debate ===
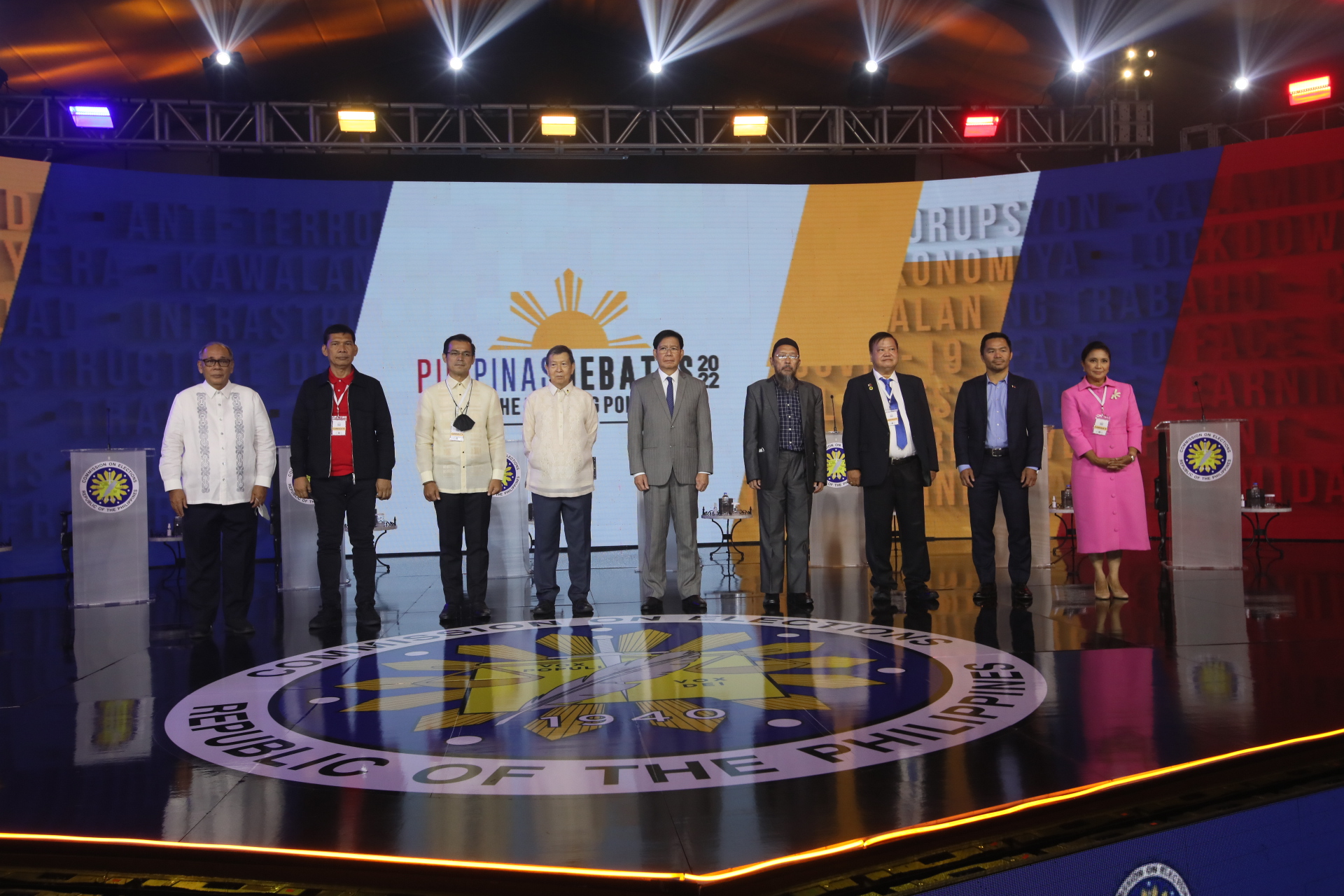
Nine presidential candidates posed for posterity before the start of the first debate on March 19, 2022

The first debate of the series took place on Saturday, March 19, 2022. While no live audience was allowed to watch, seating was made available for the candidates' preparation teams. Luchi Cruz-Valdes moderated the debate. All but one candidate, Bongbong Marcos, attended the debate.

==== Topics addressed ====
The debate focused on two key issues, the COVID-19 pandemic and economic recovery. Each candidate was given 90 seconds to answer each question, while 30 seconds were allotted for other candidates to state their rebuttals.

===== Economic policies and employment =====
Candidates were asked what sector they will prioritize to revive the economy. Ernesto Abella selected the agricultural sector, vowing to make the Philippines an "agricultural powerhouse." Leody de Guzman and Isko Moreno also selected agriculture; De Guzman pushed for the repeal of the Rice Tariffication Law, while Moreno vowed to pursue food security. Norberto Gonzales selected job creation as his focus, stating that he will push for cheaper access to capital for businesses. Jose Montemayor Jr. for his part vowed to employ "fiscal and monetary policy." Faisal Magondato did not pick a specific sector. Manny Pacquiao stated that he will focus on attracting investments, promoting exports, and smarter government spending. Panfilo Lacson and Leni Robredo picked the small and medium-sized enterprises sector, with Robredo promising to make a 100 billion-peso (US$1.9 billion) stimulus package for small businesses.

Regarding the unemployment of fresh graduates, the candidates proposed various solutions. Abella stressed the need for a program for students affected by the pandemic. De Guzman promised to strengthen Technical Education and Skills Development Authority (TESDA) centers. Moreno vowed to invest in science, technology, engineering, and mathematics (STEM) and agriculture for state universities. Gonzales commented that it would take some time to upskill workers, emphasizing the need to focus on self-generated jobs instead. Lacson suggested easing restrictions and pushed for the continuation of work-from-home setups. Magondato promised to provide capital to unemployed Filipinos for starting businesses. Montemayor denounced what he called "discrimination" against unvaccinated workers. Pacquiao vowed to focus on creating jobs. Robredo cited the low quality of education as the problem, vowing to raise the education budget to 6% of the country's GDP.

Amidst the rise of oil prices, almost all candidates agreed that the excise tax should be suspended, although they recognized that it would not be enough. Almost all candidates also agreed on the proposed 4-day work week, but with reservations.

===== Healthcare and the COVID-19 pandemic =====
The presidential bets gave different proposals regarding the pandemic. Mangondato stated that the government should lessen its dependence on importing treatments for the disease. Montemayor emphasized the need to test, trace, and treat. He later called out the Inter-Agency Task Force for the Management of Emerging Infectious Diseases (IATF), incorrectly stating that it was composed of lawyers. He was quickly corrected by Moreno. Pacquiao said the people must learn to live with COVID. He also mentioned that international borders should be closed to prevent a surge. Robredo asserted the need to boost testing and vaccination to withstand another surge. Abella promised to form a "health security council" to consult all stakeholders while highlighting the need for free mass testing and eliminating vaccine hesitancy. De Guzman stated that the government should not make the pandemic a "business." He also stated that more healthcare workers should be hired. Moreno vowed to reform PhilHealth. Gonzales agreed with Robredo's statement, and added that he would also appeal to the United Nations to stop Western countries from turning the pandemic into a "business." Lacson promised to establish a virology center.

===== Infrastructure development =====
The candidates gave mixed reactions regarding the success of the Duterte administration's Build! Build! Build! (BBB) infrastructure program. Abella praised the program and vowed to continue it. De Guzman criticized BBB, stating that the funds for the projects should have been used for the government's pandemic response instead. Moreno stated that the program was a success and also promised to continue the program, although he would focus on housing and hospitals. Gonzales said that he would examine if BBB was successful in connecting the country. Meanwhile, Lacson emphasized that there were numerous projects yet to be completed. He will continue the program but will prioritize public–private partnerships (PPPs) instead of official development assistance (ODA). Magondato answered vaguely, promising to focus on improving Filipinos' lives. Montemayor promised to honor infrastructure contracts. Pacquiao assured that he will continue BBB but will focus on housing and Mindanao projects. Robredo also vowed to continue the program, though PPPs will be prioritized.

===== Other topics =====
The candidates were asked about what they learned during their campaigns. Moreno commented that he saw that development was focused in Metro Manila, vowing that if elected, he will focus on countryside development. Gonzales stated that he observed that the country's political system is problematic, hindering development. Lacson spoke of the disconnect that he observed in the allocation of resources between the national and local governments. Magondato stated that he learned that to empower LGUs, there is a need to shift to federalism. Montemayor agreed with him and praised the Supreme Court for the Mandanas ruling. Pacquiao said his desire to fight corruption was strengthened by his exposure to poverty. Robredo said that even before the campaign period, she immersed herself in many communities and listened to their concerns. According to her, these experiences shaped her policies and projects as a congresswoman and vice president.

After De Guzman brought up the issue of funding for aid, Moreno brought up the 203 billion-peso (US$3.8 billion) tax liabilities of the Marcos family. Moreno, Robredo, Lacson, and de Guzman called on the heirs of the elder Marcos to pay the estate and income taxes owed to the state.

All candidates denounced fake news and disinformation and asserted that social media to be controlled and held accountable. Robredo also mentioned that she was the number one victim of fake news, while Marcos was the number one beneficiary of disinformation.

===== Closing statements =====
Abella stressed the need for the government to listen to its citizens. De Guzman called for changing the government's system and warned that nothing will change if the next president was rich, supported by the rich, or part of a political dynasty. Gonzales appealed to voters to make the right decision. Lacson cited his stint as the Chief of the Philippine National Police and pointed out that he is the only candidate who risked his life for the country. Magondato stated that he offers a change for the country's "rotten system." Montemayor vowed "Godly leadership" and peace and also promised to abolish the IATF and mandatory vaccination. Moreno highlighted his life experiences and called himself a "crisis manager" that the country needs. Pacquiao recalled his origins as a person from poverty and declared that he was trustworthy and honest. Robredo emphasized the need for leaders to be present in difficult situations and asserted that she is the only one who has been present for Filipinos during the pandemic and the typhoon season.

==== Reception ====
Commissioner George Garcia lauded the debate, stating that it was "not perfect, but highly successful." He also praised the nine candidates who attended, calling them the "magnificent nine." Marcos was criticized for skipping the debate.

=== March 20 vice presidential debate ===
The second debate of the series was held on March 20, 2022. Broadcaster Ruth Cabal moderated the debate. Two candidates, Lito Atienza and Sara Duterte, did not attend the debate, with the former being absent for health reasons. Each candidate were allotted two minutes to answer a question and another 30 seconds their rebuttal.

==== Topics addressed ====
The debate centered on government accountability and domestic policy.

===== Government accountability and corruption =====
When asked about whether they favor having a single anti-corruption agency, the candidates gave several answers. Walden Bello sang "Where Are You?" and addressed it to the Marcos–Duterte tandem; in the song, he urged Marcos to pay the estate tax owed by the Marcos family. Rizalito David favored keeping the current setup but added that it needed to be made more effective. Manny SD Lopez rejected the proposal to make an anti-corruption agency, asserting that present institutions such as the courts and media are sufficient for countering corruption. He also suggested to make corruption a crime punishable by death. Willie Ong proposed making Commission on Audit (COA) reports and statements of assets, liabilities, and net worth (SALNs) public, but that there must be due process. Francis Pangilinan suggested strengthening and modernizing the judiciary. Carlos Serapio commented that there needs to be "internal change." Tito Sotto proposed an internal cleansing of the government. His suggestion was expounded on by David and Serapio. David commented that the country would be more progressive if leaders listened to "what God is telling," while Serapio noted that the government's current system "betrays public trust" and likened it to the fable of the turtle and scorpion. Bello later made allegations of corruption in several Davao City projects, such as the Davao City coastal road project and the PUV modernization program.

Other candidates also raised questions at the candidates who are incumbent senators. Lopez also asserted that the presence of pork barrel is correlated with corruption. Pangilinan emphasized his track record, stating that in his three terms, he had never been implicated in a corruption case. Sotto highlighted his proposed budget reform program that will enable local governments to propose their own budgets in the national budget. For his part, Serapio asked the senators if there was a monopoly of economic and political power among political families and oligarchies, which made it difficult to address corruption. Sotto reemphasized his proposal to reform the national expenditure program, saying that the national government had a monopoly. Pangilinan noted that he was a principal author of an anti-dynasty bill in the Senate, but it had not been passed due to time restraints.

===== Health and the COVID-19 pandemic =====
The candidates gave several reactions regarding the government's response to the COVID-19 pandemic. Bello criticized the government for its supposedly dismal and "militaristic" approach to the pandemic. David agreed with Bello and added that the government ignored proposals from experts. Lopez stated that the response was initially slow but improved. Ong warned of a future surge in cases and emphasized the need for infectious disease hospitals and a center for disease control. Pangilinan suggested free testing and proper compensation for healthcare workers. Sotto stated that the country should produce its own vaccines and medical supplies and also highlighted the need to properly compensate health workers. Serapio stated that the government had "done its best" and asked his fellow candidates about how they will implement their suggested programs. Sotto commented that Ong's proposal to establish infectious disease hospitals could take two to three years, suggesting instead to convert districts hospitals into infectious disease hospitals, using the San Lazaro Hospital in Manila as an example. Ong pointed out that the San Lazaro Hospital is old and emphasized that medicines should be made cheaper and alternative medicine should be considered. Bello agreed with Sotto's suggestion to manufacture vaccines locally, and added that the government should break companies' monopoly on trade-related intellectual property rights, particularly vaccines. Lopez stated that people should be educated about the viral life cycle. David suggested that local governments should be given more power to decide on what to do with their constituents. Two candidates, Pangilinan and Sotto, also questioned the decreased budget for research and development.

===== Domestic policy =====
All candidates agreed that the 200-peso fuel subsidy given by the government was insufficient to address the rise of oil prices. Bello, Pangilinan, and Sotto all suggested to suspend excise taxes on fuel, with Sotto also suggesting tax breaks and wage hikes. David stated that the government should help small businesses. Lopez commented that oil companies should not increase prices as they have reserves. Ong reiterated his running mate's proposal of cutting fuel and energy taxes. Serapio proposed an "energy relief" program.

The candidates were also asked about what expertise they can offer to the president. Bello refused to answer the question and repeated his criticism of the Marcos–Duterte tandem for not attending debates. David stated that he will push for making a commission to address the country's "moral, ethical and spiritual problems." Lopez said that he will propose a recovery package to the president, and help with issues around geopolitics and international relations. Ong promised to suggest measures to improve food safety and address mental health issues. He added that the drug war should be undergo changes and should be treated as a health problem. Pangilinan vowed to focus on improving agriculture. Serapio stated that he will do whatever the president will assign to him.

===== Other topics =====
As the 1987 Constitution does not mandate any specific powers and roles for the vice president, the candidates were asked about what should be added if the constitution would be amended. Lopez says that the vice president must assume the presidency in emergencies. Ong pushed for tandem voting; Serapio agreed with him. Pangilinan also supported Ong's suggestion, but added that the roles given by the current constitution was already enough. Bello disagreed with tandem voting, stating the need for checks and balances in the government. Sotto suggested that the vice president can be the Senate President or a presiding officer of the Senate. David instead pushed for changing the country's system from the current presidential system to a parliamentary system.

Bello hit Duterte for refusing to participate in debates, and made several allegations about Davao City being the "drug center of the south" controlled by a Duterte family member. Bello also criticized Pangilinan for abstaining from voting on the Rice Tariffication Law. The other candidates also commented on Duterte's absence.

==== Closing statements ====
Bello said that he and his running mate, De Guzman, were different from the other candidates, and listed their platform. He also stated that their vision was democratic socialism. David called for a grand coalition to defeat the Marcos–Duterte ticket. Lopez spoke of his experiences in the private and public sector, and vowed to pursue what is best for the country. Ong emphasized his role as a doctor, stating that his goal is to help Filipinos live longer, citing the risk of another pandemic surge or nuclear war. Pangilinan expressed his concern over rising food prices, and vowed to address the issue of food security if elected. Serapio reminded the public to get to know the candidates that they are voting for. Sotto reiterated his long tenure in the Senate, and stated that he knows the problems of the country well. He added that he ran for the vice presidency because he was tired of making laws that were not being implemented.

==== Reception ====
Bello's allegations of corruption and proliferation of drugs in the city were countered by the Davao City government. Duterte's regional party, Hugpong ng Pagbabago, also requested an investigation over Bello's claims, and added that Bello was a "narcopolitician" as he purportedly withheld information from law enforcement authorities. He was later named persona non grata by the Davao City council.

== Broadcast ==
All domestic television and radio broadcasters committed to air PiliPinas Debates 2022. GMA Network, on their part, broadcast the debate on DepEd TV. COMELEC streamed the debate on its social media accounts, including Facebook, Twitter, and YouTube.
