= OCTA Research =

Polling company in the Philippines

- Formation: 2019; 7 years ago
- Location: Quezon City, Philippines
- Region served: Philippines
- President: Ranjit Rye
- Website: www.octaresearch.com

OCTA Research (stylized as OCTAResearch) is a private polling, research, and consultation firm based in Quezon City which became known for their advisories related to the COVID-19 pandemic in the Philippines.

== Background ==
The OCTA Research Group is alternatively known as UP–OCTA since they are initially composed of eight members affiliated with the University of the Philippines (UP). Other faculty and alumni of UP as well as people affiliated with other universities joined the group. The group was established in 2019, initially with the main intention to become a polling group. However with the onset of the COVID-19 pandemic in the Philippines, OCTA Research decided to focus on making projections related to the health crisis.

The OCTA Research Group began conducting study on the pandemic in April 2020 relying on data from the Department of Health. They have issued projections on COVID-19 cases, made recommendations to the government's COVID-19 community quarantine measures, and conducted opinion poll surveys.

The organization has been subject to criticism by some members of the Congress due to finding OCTA's public releases as alarmist due to the usage of "surge" to refer to a rise of COVID-19 cases and "epicenters" to certain areas with an upward trend of cases. The group has also been perceived to preempt the expectations of lockdown due to their public announcements. The methodology of the group has also been questioned.

In August 2021, the group expressed intentions to establish itself in public opinion polling, naming SWS and Pulse Asia as benchmarks.
