= List of bills in the 18th Congress of the Philippines =

The bills of the 18th Congress of the Philippines list includes proposed laws that were introduced in the 18th Congress of the Philippines. This Congress will last from July 22, 2019 until the next elections on 2022.

The Congress of the Philippines is the bicameral legislature of the Republic of the Philippines consisting of two chambers: the lower chamber known as the House of Representatives and the upper chamber known as the Senate. The House of Representatives and the Senate are equal partners in the legislative process, which means that bills introduced in either chamber cannot become law unless passed by both. The bills listed below are arranged on the basis of which chamber they were first introduced in, and then chronologically by date.

== Introduced in the House of Representatives ==
=== Bills ===
H.B. number	Date of introduction	Short title	Description
HB00001	July 1, 2019	National Values, Etiquette, and Moral Uprightness Act	Seeks to establish the Commission on Filipino Values which shall conduct a nationwide consultation, craft a Program on National Values, Etiquette and Moral Uprightness; and draft a road map for its implementation. Intends the institutionalization of the Program in educational institutions which shall include but not limited to patriotism, national pride and identity, and proposes that teaching of the Program shall be included as part of the curriculum in all levels in Kindergarten, Elementary, Secondary, Technical-Vocational, and College institutions in the country. Declares that all private entities, government offices, GOCCs, national agencies, and LGUs shall include modules of the same subject in its employee orientation or training programs and seminars.
HB00002	July 1, 2019	Department of OFW Act of 2019	Aims to address the absence of a single agency tasks to address foreign employment concerns in order for the government to focus on the needs and demands of migration in general and of OFWs in particular. Proposes to have a one-stop shop to serve as the umbrella agency that would manage, harmonize, and strengthen existing policies and programs on migration to address OFW needs and avoid overlapping jurisdiction or conflict of policy pronouncements. Intends to expedite the fulfillment of the objectives of the Global Compact for Safe, Orderly and Regular Migration (GCM) adopted by the Philippines, which is an inter-governmentally negotiated agreement that has 23 objectives for the protection and promotion of the rights of migrant workers.
HB00003	July 1, 2019	Trust Fund for the Abandoned, Neglected, or Voluntarily Committed Child of 2019	Seeks to provide a trust fund account in a trust entity for every covered abandoned, neglected, or voluntary committed children which shall be entitled to a quarterly deposit in his/her trust fund for the entire duration that the child was in an orphanage or child-caring institution and shall receive the lump sum amount when he/she reaches the age of eighteen (18).
HB00004	July 1, 2019	Emergency Response Department Act of 2019	Seeks to establish the Emergency Response Department which shall prepare, integrate, coordinate, implement, supervise, control, monitor, and evaluate all plans, programs, projects, and activities of the Government on humanitarian emergency assistance and disaster risk reduction and management. Mandates the Department to assume the policy-making, coordination, integration, supervision, monitoring and evaluation functions currently logged with the existing NDRRMC, and shall take over all of the latter's responsibilities enumerated in Section 6 of RA 10121 and the functions of the OCD as enumerated in Section 9 of the same law. Designates the Department as the manager of the Human Emergency Assistance and Disaster (HEAD) Fund to ensure accountability and the responsible use of public funds and all monetary donations or otherwise. Gives visitorial powers to ensure that funding and donations to all entities are used actually, directly, and exclusively for disaster risk reduction efforts.
HB00005	July 1, 2019	Puhunan, Tulungan, Kaunlaran Act of 2019	Provides that the State should institutionalize a loan program with a simplified process and with low interest that can provide members of the working class in need of capital with sufficient funds to start their own business. Creates a comprehensive development and assistance program for MSMEs to protect the capital of small proprietors, ensure the success of their MSMEs, and transform them into five-star businesses by providing them with assistance and the necessary resources in order to help their business flourish. Intends to provide a program where: a) Requirements for loan applications and approval are very basic, and there is no collateral requirement; b) Loan proceeds are exclusively used for capital; c) Interests are very close to prevailing bank rates; d) The lenders have a pragmatic collection mechanism; and e) The mode of payment is on a daily or weekly basis.
HB00006	July 1, 2019	Teachers Salary Increase Act of 2019	Provides additional support in the form of allowances, inflationary adjustment assistance, medical care and well-being allowance, teaching supplies allowance, and Magna Carta Bonus to public school teachers, locally funded teachers, Philippine Science High School system teaching and non-teaching personnel, and Non-teaching personnel of the DepEd, excluding those occupying positions from salary grade level 30, under the DepEd schedule of salaries, and/or Assistant Secretary upwards.
HB00007	July 1, 2019	Department of Fisheries and Aquatic Resources Act of 2019	Provides for the creation of a Department that shall have primary jurisdiction over the management, development, utilization and disposition of all fishery and aquatic resources of the country, including the habitats of fish and all other marine life and over activities which impact on these habitats; and the sole authority to supervise and regulate the production and capture of fish and fishery products within its jurisdiction, as well as the processing and marketing of all fisheries and aquatic products in the country, and to rationalize all ocean sector initiatives which impact on fish and maritime resources or their habitats. Proposes to abolish the Bureau of Fisheries and Aquatic Resources and transfer its relevant functions, appropriations, records, properties, equipment and personnel to the Department of Fisheries and Aquatic Resources; and abolishes, transfers and merges other government units and agencies to the Department pursuant to the implementation of this Act.
HB00008	July 1, 2019	Health Passport System Act	Provides for a Health Passport that shall serve as the patient's official recognition that he could avail of the free medical and dental diagnostic tests in government hospitals subject to the requirements of the DOH and the local government units where passport holder resides which shall contain the following information: a. Patient's medical and dental history as recorded by the physician, dentist or authorized health professionals; b. Medical and dental test results; c. Diagnosis; d. Medicines and medical treatment availed of; e. Basic medical data; f. Information on all medical and health related benefits provided by laws; and g. Information regarding the patient's medical rights and privileges under passport system. Mandates the parents or legal guardians of children born after the effectivity of this Act to enroll their children in the health passport program to record the child's initial medical check-up and immunization. Failure to provide the child with medical check-ups and immunization shall constitute an evidence of violation of the provisions of Article VI, Section 10 of RA 7610, otherwise known as the Anti-Child Abuse Act.
HB00009	July 1, 2019	The Progresibong Pilipinas Para sa Lahat ng Pilipino Act of 2019	Intends to create a more progressive Philippines for every Filipino through: a) Conduct of periodic comprehensive studies on focusing on challenges and opportunities for regional economic development; b) Ensure quality health and education facilities in all regions; c) Establishment of Regional Centers of Excellence; d) Determine the appropriate region and specific location to transfer selected National Government Agencies (NGAs); and e) Establish mechanisms of decentralization including procurement procedures, among others.
HB00010	July 1, 2019	Coconut Farmers and Industry Trust Fund Act	Aims to make sure that the coconut farmers benefit from the coco levy fund; that more funds will be provided for infrastructure and research to strengthen the coconut industry, and efforts shall be supported to recover the remaining funds. Reconstitutes the Philippine Coconut Authority to ensure the participation of coconut farmers in the crafting and implementation of the Coconut Farmers and Industry Development Plan; Creates a Coconut Farmers and Industry Trust Fund which shall be capitalized, managed, invested, utilized and accounted for in the manner provided in this Act and shall be used for the benefit of the coconut farmers and the development of the coconut industry; Mandates the Designated Disposition Entities assigned by the Trust Fund Management Committee to privatized or disposed Coco Levy Assets subject to the regulatory approvals as required by law and to take title to and possession of, conserve, provisionally manage, and dispose the Coco Levy Assets which have been identified for privatization and disposition.
HB00011	July 1, 2019	Mega Cebu Development Authority Act	Aims to establish the Mega Cebu Development Authority.
HB00012	July 1, 2019	Freedom of Information Act	Seeks to promote a clear transparency and accountability in government; a convenient procedure to facilitate access to information; remedies available for denial of access; administrative, civil and criminal penalties for violation thereof, among others. Access to information shall cover all official records, documents and papers pertaining to official acts, transactions or decisions, and government research data used as basis for policy development, subject to limitations provided under this Act.
HB00013	July 1, 2019	Motorcycles-for-Hire Act	Allows any two-wheeled motor vehicle that may be registered with the Land Transportation Office as for hire and may be used as a commercial vehicle to transport passengers and goods provided that the motorcycle shall have a minimum engine displacement of 125 cubic centimeters and a backbone type built. Ensures the safety and roadworthiness of motorcycles-for-hire by prohibiting any modifications on said vehicle except the installation of motorcycle luggage carrier, saddlebag, step board or foot peg and appropriate speed limiter and monitoring device based on safe engineering specifications.
HB00014	July 1, 2019	LRT-MRT Cebu Act	Seeks to provide a light rail transport (LRT) system or metro rail transport (MRT) system or monorail transport system or such other appropriate modern mass transport system in the city of Cebu and Metro Cebu.
HB00015	July 1, 2019	Human Rights Defenders Protection Act	Provides and enumerates the rights and freedoms of human rights defenders; grants the right to effective remedy and full reparation, both monetary and non-monetary in the event of a violation of the rights provided for or a breach of obligations under the Act; provides and enumerates the obligations of the State and public authorities and shall take all the necessary measures to ensure that the rights and fundamental freedoms are effectively guaranteed and protected; imposes sanctions for violations of the rights and freedoms of human rights defenders; and requires extraordinary diligence by concerned government personnel in processing and handling any complaint or report for violation of human rights and fundamental freedom.
HB00016	July 1, 2019	N/A	Aims to start construction of a light rail transport (LRT) system or metro rail transport (MRT) system or monorail transport over, as well as a subway transport system under the three (3) most congested road sections in the first district of the city of Cebu and appropriating funds therefor.
HB00017	July 1, 2019	N/A	Seeks for the construction of skyway overpasses over and tunnel underpasses under three (3) most congested road sections in the First District of the City of Cebu.
HB00018	July 1, 2019	N/A	Seeks to rename the Mactan-Cebu International Airport Authority to Lapu-Lapu - Cebu International Airport Authority and Mactan-Cebu International Airport to Lapu-Lapu - Cebu International Airport.
HB00019	July 1, 2019	N/A	Seeks to establish and construct a second runway at the Mactan-Cebu International Airport.
HB00020	July 1, 2019	N/A	Seeks the construction of a bridge from Cebu City to the Municipality of Cordova, Province of Cebu and a coastal road / expressway to the Mactan-Cebu International Airport, Lapu-Lapu City, as well as a bridge from the Municipality of Consolacion, Province of Cebu to the Mactan-Cebu International Airport, Lapu-Lapu City.
HB00021	July 1, 2019	Department of Culture Act of 2019	Creates a Department which shall be responsible for the protection, preservation, regulations, development, management, dissemination and promotion of the cultural, historical and artistic heritage and resources of the Philippines and the Filipino people. Seeks to abolish the National Commission for Culture and the Arts (NCCA) and transfer its powers and functions, funds and appropriations, records, equipment, property and personnel to the Department with the following agencies being attached thereto: 1. Cultural Center of the Philippines; 2. National Museum of the Philippines; 3. National Historical Commission of the Philippines; 4. National Library of the Philippines; 5. National Archives of the Philippines; 6. Komisyon sa Wikang Filipino; 7. Intramuros Administration; 8. National Parks Development Committee; 9. Nayong Pilipino Foundation; and 10. Film Development Council of the Philippines.
HB00022	July 1, 2019	N/A	Seeks to provide security of tenure for barangay health workers.
HB00023	July 1, 2019	N/A	Seeks to amend Paragraph (A), Section 393, Chapter IV, Title I, Book III of Republic Act No. 7160, the local government code in order to increase the benefits of barangay officials.
HB00024	July 1, 2019	Pili Industry Development Act	Seeks to subsidize the Pili Industry and fund the Pili Research and Development Center. It also aims to declare the province of Sorsogon, the Pili Capital of the Philippines.
HB00025	July 1, 2019	Air Passenger Bill of Rights Act	States that contract of air carriage is perfected from the moment the air carrier and the passenger gives their respective consent to the said agreement wherein the air carrier obliges to transport the passenger or one’s baggage from one place to another, without any damage or injury upon the latter’s person, or loss, damage or unreasonable deterioration of his baggage, if any, and when the passenger obliges oneself to pay a just and reasonable air fare. Provides the rights and obligations of the passengers; the rights, duties and obligation of the air carriers; and the obligation of the CAAP, CAB and airport operators.
HB00026	July 1, 2019	N/A	Aims to amend Section 9, paragraph (m) of Republic Act No. 7356 by including a National Artist as head of the Sub-Commission of the Arts who shall be appointed by the President upon the recommendation of the other members of the Order of National Artists.
HB00027	July 1, 2019	Public School Teachers Incentive Act	Provides that any public school teacher who is assigned to a town other than his own shall be entitled to Two Thousand Pesos (P2,000.00) monthly incentive allowance; and those who are assigned to a town of another province, other than their own, shall receive Four Thousand Pesos (P4,000.00) monthly incentive allowance.
HB00028	July 1, 2019	Land Transport Support Facilities for Hygiene and Convenience Act	Seeks to provide public restrooms which shall be constructed every thirty (30) to fifty (50) kilometres apart along national and provincial highways throughout the country and shall be maintained and supervised by the council or any nongovernmental organization (NGO) of the barangay where it is situated. Allows collection of reasonable payment per head which shall be held in a trust fund for the development projects of a particular barangay where the public restroom is situated.
HB00029	July 1, 2019	Magna Carta of Workers in the Informal Sector	Defines informal sector known as IS as “units”, whether individual or group, own-account/self-employed or micro-entrepreneur or livelihood enterprises regularly employing family members, engaged in the production of goods and services with the primary objective of generating employment and incomes to the units concerned in order to earn a living. Seeks for the social protection and empowerment of the members of the informal sector by providing access to social protection benefits and to provide appropriate regulation, due representation in local government agencies and meaningful planning that will harness their full potentials to become effective economic actors.
HB00030	July 1, 2019	Department of Disaster Resilience Act	Aims to designate and empower the DDR as the lead agency for the implementation of 1) vulnerability and risk reduction policies, programs and projects; 2) rehabilitation and reconstruction; and 3) assess collective progress towards achieving purpose of Agreement and reconstruction and its long-term goals, in a comprehensive sustainable manner, considering prevention, mitigation, anticipatory adaptation measures and support, in the light of equity, capacity building, best available science, technology transfer and other development. Aims to build and improve upon the previous law, RA10121 that created the NDRRMC's where the DDR will be the body with sufficient power, mandate, and resources to implement, integrate and mainstream disaster risk and vulnerability reduction and climate change adaptation and mitigation into local and national processes. Proposes several transfer of powers, functions, funds and others, and attachment of several offices/ agencies to the Department, particularly the Climate Change Office of the Climate Change Commission; the Philippine Atmospheric, Geophysical and Astronomical Services Administration (PAGASA; Philippine Institute of Volcanology and Seismology (PHILVOLCS).
HB00031	July 1, 2019	Eastern Seaboard Strategic Defense Plan Act	Seeks to protect and defend the part of our national territory which includes Benham Rise which has been acknowledged and confirmed by the United Nations Commission on the Limits of the Continental Shelf pursuant to the UNCLOS to be part of the Philippine Continental Shelf. Intends to adopt a strategic plan on developing our capability to protect our rights over Benham Rise and our entire eastern seaboard in order to monitor, track and challenge, vessels in our waters. Provides that our Navy, Coast Guard and Air Force be equipped with sufficient assets to carry out this mission and for the establishment of coastal facilities that will cater to air, sea and surveillance assets on the eastern seaboard.
HB00032	July 1, 2019	Body Camera Act	Seeks to require law enforcement personnel to wear a body camera whenever they conduct law enforcement and special police operations intends to achieve the delicate balancing act of respecting and protecting human rights while at the same time protect our law enforcement officers from harm, death or adverse legal action as they undertake their official functions.
HB00033	July 1, 2019	Plastics Labelling Act of 2019	Seeks to mandate the labelling of plastic products according to the type of plastic resin used in such products. Despite the waste segregation schemes in the collection of garbage being employed by different local government units, puts into place a system that would hasten the management and disposal of plastic products in order to minimize their harmful impact on the environment.
HB00034	July 1, 2019	Imported Wastes Prohibition Act	Intends to prohibit the importation of wastes that have not been processed to eradicate or minimize their environmental impact and have no beneficial value to our people or our country Provides for a fine of not less than One Million Pesos (Php1,000,000.00) and imprisonment of not less than six (6) months.
HB00035	July 1, 2019	Benham Rise Research and Development Institute Act	Seeks to establish the Benham Rise Research and Development Institute.
HB00036	July 1, 2019	Philippine Rise and National Park (PRNP) Act of 2019	Seeks to establish the Philippine Rise Natural Park in the Province of Isabela as a protected area under the N.I.P.A.S. Act (R.A. 7586).
HB00037	July 1, 2019	Public Utility Motorcycles Act	Seeks to provide the legal environment for motorcycle riding services to operate and to take cognizance of the necessity and practicality of the use of motorcycles to ferry passengers while at the same time taking into consideration the safety of the drivers and passengers alike as well as the ensuing obligations and liabilities of a party in case of accidents or mishaps.
HB00038	July 1, 2019	Faster Internet Services Act	Seeks to mandate the National Telecommunications Commission (NTC) to require Internet Service Providers (ISPs) to deliver minimum internet connection speeds of 10 megabytes per second (mbps) for all mobile, fixed and fixed wireless broadband/internet access to their subscribers and shall modify, improve, or change telecommunication lines and systems or expand their infrastructure to run on higher capacity bandwidths based on the number of subscribers demanding for their services.
HB00039	July 1, 2019	Proper Road Use Education Act	Seeks to mandate the inclusion of road use and safety in the elementary education curriculum as it intends to instill discipline in the road among people at an early age; to inculcate in them, the concern for the well-being and safety of others that should be primordial to anyone using our roads. It is envisioned to contribute in improving traffic situation in order to make the roads safer to travel and minimize losses incurred due to traffic and accidents.
HB00040	July 1, 2019	ENDS Regulation Act	Aims to address the unregulated and unchecked sale or distribution of ENDS such as electronic cigarettes/e-cigs, vaping devices, and the like. Proposes to regulate the proliferation of ENDS in the market and to strictly prohibit the use, sale and distribution of these products to minors. Defines ENDS as products that contain tobacco-derived substances, but in which tobacco is not necessary for operation; they are battery-powered devices that provide inhaled doses of nicotine or other substances by delivering vaporized propylene glycol/nicotine mixture.

== Introduced in the Senate ==
S.B. number	Date of introduction	Short title	Description
SB00001	July 1, 2019	Medical Scholarship Act	Seeks to provide medical scholarships in state universities and colleges to qualified students.
SB00002	July 1, 2019	Anti-Drug Penal Institution Act	Seeks to establish a detention program and facility for high-level drug offenders within the national penitentiary system under the Bureau of Corrections.
SB00003	July 1, 2019	Presidential Drug Enforcement Authority Act	Seeks to amend Article XI of Republic Act No. 9165 otherwise known as The Comprehensive Drugs Act of 2002, and creating the Presidential Drug Enforcement Authority.
SB00004	July 1, 2019	Creating the Dangerous Drugs Court	Seeks to create a special court to be known as The Dangerous Drugs Court.
SB00005	July 1, 2019	Lowering the Minimum Age of Criminal Responsibility	Seeks to lower the minimum age of criminal responsibility.
