= Samahan ng Progresibong Kabataan =

Left-wing Youth and student organization in the Philippines

Union of Progressive Youth Samahan ng Progresibong Kabataan or SPARK Kabataan
- Spokesperson: Milo Basuel
- Founded: 2015; 11 years ago
- Preceded by: Sanlakas Youth
- Headquarters: Manila, Philippines
- Membership: 300+
- Ideology: Socialism; Anti-Imperialism; Anti-Capitalism
- Position: Left-wing
- Colours: Red Yellow
- National affiliation: Laban ng Masa (2017, 2022); Sanlakas
- Website: www.facebook.com/SparkKabataan

Samahan ng Progresibong Kabataan or SPARK Kabataan (SPARK; lit. 'Union of Progressive Youth') is a progressive youth and student organization in the Philippines founded in 2015. The organization describes itself as progressive and anti-capitalist. SPARK describes its aims as “unite the youth to realize its integral role in shaping history by linking it to the struggle of the marginalized sectors of society.”.

SPARK Kabataan has campaigned on issues concerning education, civil liberties, labor rights, and government accountability. It has participated in electoral coalitions with Laban ng Masa, which supported had Leody de Guzman and Walden Bello for the 2022 Philippine presidential election. SPARK participated in demonstrations concerning public policy and the rights of protesters.

== History ==
=== Early History (2015-2016) ===
It was founded in 2015. SPARK Kabataan takes part in rallies with Bukluran ng Manggagawang Pilipino, Zone One Tondo Organization, Kongreso ng Pagkakaisa ng Maralita ng Lungsod and Partido Lakas ng Masa.

=== Duterte Administration (2016-2022) ===
By November 2020, SPARK had at least 300 members and described its aim as uniting the youth around the struggles of marginalized sectors.

==== Curfew Case ====
In July 2016, amid President Rodrigo Duterte's push for curfews on minors, SPARK led a petition to the Supreme Court of the Philippines challenging juvenile curfew ordinances in Quezon City, Manila and Navotas. The court's decision, summarizing the petition, describes SPARK as an association of young adults and minors that aims to forward a free and just society and to protect the rights and welfare of the youth. In August 2017, the court partly granted the petition. It struck down the Manila and Navotas ordinances and upheld Quezon City's, and it ruled that the penalties the Manila ordinance imposed on minors conflicted with the Juvenile Justice and Welfare Act. The court noted that SPARK, as an unincorporated association, had no legal personality to bring the case, but it relaxed the standing requirement because of the importance of the issues.

==== Marcos Sr. Remembrance ====
In August 2018, after Ilocos Norte governor Imee Marcos said that people who continued to criticize the Marcos family should move on, SPARK, Anakbayan and Akbayan Youth rejected the call. SPARK said that Marcos-era policies such as the Education Act of 1982, which activist groups say commercialized education, still affected Filipino youth. It also compared Duterte's leadership to that of Ferdinand Marcos, citing human rights abuses, the labeling of opposition figures as enemies of the state, and foreign borrowing under the Build, Build, Build program.

==== Jose Maria Sison ====
In February 2020, SPARK rejected the view of Jose Maria Sison that Duterte could become the country's greatest president, arguing that Duterte's labor and security policies and the killings during the drug war could not be offset by meeting some leftist demands.

==== Education ====
SPARK welcomed the move by the Senate Blue Ribbon Committee when they had recommended graft and perjury charges against DepEd officials over the overpriced 2021 laptop purchase.

During the COVID-19 pandemic, SPARK's spokesperson attributed the problems in Philippine education to decades of underfunding. In 2022, when government officials called for revising the K to 12 curriculum, SPARK called for sex education, climate science, modern Philippine history and labor rights to be included, and for students to have a role in the discussion.

=== Marcos Jr. Administration (2022-Present) ===
In January 2024, SPARK Kabataan joined other youth groups in opposing the Public Utility Vehicle Modernization Program and in supporting planned jeepney strikes over its franchise consolidation deadline. SPARK's national coordinator, said that the phaseout of unconsolidated jeepneys would also affect students who rely on public transport.

SPARK supported Leody de Guzman and Luke Espiritu for senate in the 2025 Philippine Senate election.

==== Anti-corruption protests (2025–2026) ====
A SPARK sticker saying "Their Luxury, Our Misery", ahead of the flood control protests.

SPARK participated in the anti-corruption protests between 2025-2026 alongside its affiliated organizations.

On March 26, 2026, a newspaper reported that SPARK claimed the Independent Commission for Infrastructure of selectively investigating flood control anomalies, arguing it has functioned "more as a shield for those closest" to President Marcos after former House Speaker Martin Romualdez was reportedly cleared of liability.

===== Camp Crame protest =====
On September 22, 2025, the day after nationwide anti-corruption demonstrations in which police clashed with protesters near Mendiola in Manila and made arrests, SPARK led a protest at the Philippine National Police headquarters at Camp Crame. SPARK's spokesperson called for the release of all detained protesters and for an investigation into the police's handling of the rallies. The group accused the police of targeting ordinary protesters while people implicated in corruption scandals went free.

===== Arrests at the EDSA anniversary march =====
On February 25, 2026, during a march along EDSA marking the 40th anniversary of the People Power Revolution, police arrested two activists, one of them a SPARK Kabataan member. Sanlakas said that police had tried to clear EDSA lanes by pushing protesters into a single line and onto the sidewalk, and that the protesters pushed back. Police charged the two with direct assault, resistance and disobedience to a person in authority, alarm and scandal, and violating the Public Assembly Act of 1985. They were released after posting bail by February 28.

SPARK, Sanlakas, Bayan and the Philippine Alliance of Human Rights Advocates (PAHRA) called for their release and for the charges to be dropped. SPARK held a rally at the Mandaluyong police headquarters, where SPARK's spokesperson said officers had tried to take the arrested member's camera before the arrest. The Philippine section of Amnesty International called the arrests arbitrary and demanded the pair's immediate and unconditional release. The PNP said its officers had followed proper procedures and that it acts when personnel are physically assaulted.

SPARK Stickers in Los Baños, Laguna

==== Pax Silica Protests ====
On October 31, 2026, SPARK staged a Halloween-themed protest at SM Megamall against the proposed Pax Silica agreement among the Philippines, the United States and allied countries, ahead of U.S. President Donald Trump's visit for the 49th ASEAN Summit. SPARK said the agreement would extract the country's labor and resources for the benefit of multinational companies and deepen its dependence on foreign capital, and it urged the youth to join broader movements opposing it.

On November 18, 2026, SPARK protested for the release of more than 200 individuals arrested in recent protests.

== Ideology ==
As a socialist organization, it has been listed among the "rejectionist" groups of the Philippine Left. SPARK describes itself as a progressive youth organization opposed to capitalism. Its stated principles include:

- Internationalism
- Opposition to systemic capitalism, being the central obstacle
- Defense of democratic and economic rights
- Critical thinking and collective leadership.
- Promotion of political awareness, participation and mobilization.

== Related ==
- Iskra, the inspiration for the name of the organization.
- Kamalayan, the breakaway of the League of Filipino Students in the National Capital Region.
