= Leody de Guzman 2022 presidential campaign =

Presidential campaign for the 2022 Philippine presidential elections

- Campaigned for: 2022 Philippine presidential election
- Candidate: Leody de Guzman; Walden Bello
- Affiliation: Partido Lakas ng Masa; Bukluran ng Manggagawang Pilipino; Laban ng Masa; Sanlakas; Samahan ng Progresibong Kabataan
- Status: Official launch: September 28, 2021; Lost election: May 9, 2022; Conceded: May 10, 2022
- Slogan: Manggagawa Naman! (English: Workers' turn!); Tayo naman. (English: It's our turn.)
- Website: kaleody.org

The 2022 presidential campaign of Leody de Guzman for president of the Philippines in the 2022 presidential election was announced on September 28, 2021. De Guzman is a unionist and labor rights activist who has served as the chairperson of the trade union federation Bukluran ng Manggagawang Pilipino.

== Background ==
Leody de Guzman is a labor leader who launched his presidential campaign under the socialist Partido Lakas ng Masa.

He ran under a platform focused on labor issues such as endo contractualization, workers' wages, health care worker benefits, and farmers and fishers' livelihood. He also vowed to reverse President Rodrigo Duterte's policies. De Guzman said he would downscale the administration Build! Build! Build! program and minimize the national government's loans. He would also repeal the TRAIN, CREATE taxation laws as well as the Anti-Terrorism Act of 2020. He also said that he would lobby for the reinstatement of ABS-CBN's franchise and release Senator Leila de Lima from detention.

Former House of Representatives member Walden Bello for the Akbayan partylist was de Guzman's candidate for vice president. Originally it was Raquel Castillo, until Bello substituted his candidacy on October 20, 2021.

== Senatorial slate ==
The following people were part of their slate:

- Roy Cabonegro, environmentalist (PLM)
- David D’Angelo, environmentalist (PLM)
- Luke Espiritu, labor leader (PLM)
- Guest candidates:
  - Teddy Baguilat, former House Representative from Ifugao (2007–2019) (Liberal)
  - Neri Colmenares, former House Representative of Bayan Muna (2009-2016) (Makabayan)
  - Senator Leila de Lima, incumbent since 2016 (Liberal)
  - Attorney Chel Diokno, founding Dean of De La Salle University College of Law (KANP)
  - Samira Gutoc, member of Bangsamoro Transition Commission (2017) (Aksyon)
  - Senator Risa Hontiveros, incumbent since 2016 (Akbayan)
  - Élmer Labog, Chairman of Kilusang Mayo Uno (Makabayan)
  - Sonny Matula, National President of Federation of Free Workers (Independent)

== Political positions ==
De Guzman plans to increase the minimum wage and end contractualization.

He opposes the return of the death penalty and the lowering of the criminal age of liability.

He proposes to grant stipends to poor students and implement a Universal Basic Income.

He favors the use of renewable energy over fossil fuels.

He supports the legalization of divorce and same-sex marriage.

De Guzman is against the red-tagging of activists, journalists, and unionists. He is in favor of abolishing the National Task Force to End Local Communist Armed Conflict and repealing the Anti-Terrorism Law.

He is in favor of repealing the Rice Tariffication Law.

He supports proposals to legalize medical marijuana.

== Endorsements ==
Leody de Guzman and Walden Bello

Public figures

- Noam Chomsky, American linguist and political activist
