= Revolutionary Workers' Party (Philippines) =

Political party in the Philippines

Revolutionary Workers' Party of the Philippines Rebolusyonaryong Partido ng Manggagawa – Pilipinas
- Abbreviation: RPM–P
- Founders: Arturo Tabara; Nilo de la Cruz
- Founded: 1995; 31 years ago
- Split from: Communist Party of the Philippines
- Armed wing: Revolutionary Proletarian Army–Alex Boncayao Brigade
- Trade union: Alliance of General Unions, Institutions and Labor Associations
- Ideology: Communism; Marxism–Leninism
- Political position: Far-left
- Secessions: Revolutionary Workers Party – Mindanao (2001); Philippine Marxist–Leninist Party (2001)

The Revolutionary Workers' Party of the Philippines (Tagalog: Rebolusyonaryong Partido ng Manggagawa – Pilipinas; RPM–P) is a communist party that split from the Communist Party of the Philippines during the Second Great Rectification Movement.

== History ==
The party was formed in 1995 following a split from the Communist Party of the Philippines after a due to ideological differences such as the rejection of Maoism, the strategy of protracted people's war and the "semifeudal" description of Philippine society, substituting it with "backwards capitalist."

The cadres of the party and its armed group Revolutionary Proletarian Army–Alex Boncayao Brigade are branded as "rejectionists" due to their rejection of Armando Liwanag's Reaffirm Our Basic Principles and Carry the Revolution Forward, the founding document of the Second Great Rectification Movement. Due to their defiance, 10,000 members were expelled from the party from 1992 to 1993, including the former secretary-general of the Visayas Commission Arturo Tabara and Filemon Lagman, the leader of the Metro Manila–Rizal Regional Party Committee. The dissident sections of the party refused to recognized this decision, which considered the leadership of Liwanag as "illegitimate" and themselves "autonomous", until a Second Congress was held. With their hopes for a new congress fleeting, they were forced to organize and form a separate party in 1995, of which the steps were commenced with an Oppositional Summit held in September or October of that year with the participation of the regional party committees of Manila–Rizal, Central Mindanao, Negros, Panay and Samar.

The said summit was held in the theoretical guidance of the "Counter-Theses" documents drafted by Lagman in 1994 and in 1995, which represents a major coherent attempt at a critique of the general line of the CPP. It built a provisional leadership body which would lead the party, which was in reality, a pre-party formation, in part due to a lack of unity within the party which stalled the process. It was only on 1 May 1998 that a founding congress was convened in Mindanao.

Today, the party continues to engage in the legal and parliamentary struggle through aboveground mass organizations, such as Alab Katipunan and Kamanggagawa Partylist which currently has a seat at the House of Representatives.

=== Splinter groups ===
The members from Central Mindanao bolted early due to the lack of unity among them on joining the RPM–P, and instead formed themselves into the Peoples' Communist Party of Mindanao. On the question of leadership, Lagman was asked by the party to serve as its provisional chairman, which he rejected, preferring to concentrate on working aboveground through the BMP and Sanlakas. Tabara then took up the role, but failed to do so when he was arrested, along with Nilo de la Cruz (Sergio Romero) in October 1996. This debacle ignited a split between Lagman and the rest of the MMRPC and the ABB led by de la Cruz, leaving the former with the aboveground formations at his disposal, which later formed the bulk of the Partido ng Manggagawang Pilipino and its derivative parties. The latter, collectively known as the "Bloke", remained with the RPM–P until they decided to disengage from the founding congress after ousting de la Cruz. This formation became the Philippine Marxist–Leninist Party.

The party's Central Mindanao branch which rejoined earlier, broke off in 2001 after a disagreement with the national leadership during the peace talks with the national government. The Revolutionary Workers' Party – Mindanao (RPM–M) has been the Philippine section of the Fourth International since 2003. At the same time, party members in Luzon not aligned with Tabara and de la Cruz split and formed an organization called Balaraw.

In April 2007, the RPM–P experienced another serious split in its ranks when de la Cruz, who succeeded Tabara as party chairman after the latter's assassination in 2004, expelled Central Committee members Ma. Veronica Tabara (Inca), Joseph Stephen Paduano (Carapali Lualhati), and Ariel Sumandar (Suk). Paduano, as vice-chairman, retorted that the process was "illegitimate" since expulsions can only be done through a party congress. In response, the Tabara–Paduano group convened a separate congress wherein they expelled de la Cruz as chairman and nine other Central Committee members, and had the former replaced by Fidel Nava (Tabara). The faction liquidated themselves as a party and was transformed into the Kapatiran Para sa Progresong Panlipunan, Inc. (Kapatiran).

== See also ==
- Communist armed conflicts in the Philippines
