= Rene Magtubo =

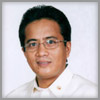
- Official portrait, 2004

Member of the Marikina City Council from the 2nd district
- Incumbent
- Assumed office June 30, 2019

Member of the Philippine House of Representatives for Partido ng Manggagawa
- In office July 10, 2003 – June 30, 2007

Member of the Philippine House of Representatives for Sanlakas
- In office June 30, 1998 – June 30, 2001

Personal details
- Born: Renato Berja Magtubo; December 12, 1959 (age 66) Davao City, Philippines
- Party: Lakas (2024–present); Partido Manggagawa (electoral party; 2001–present)
- Other political affiliations: Liberal (2018–2024); Sanlakas (party-list; 1998–2001)
- Spouse: Susana "Judy" Magtubo
- Profession: Politician

Renato "Rene" Berja Magtubo (born December 12, 1959) is a Filipino politician and labor leader who has served as a member of the Marikina City Council since 2019. He previously served as representative for the party-list Sanlakas from 1998 to 2001, and as representative for the party-list Partido ng Manggagawa from 2003 to 2007.

Magtubo served as secretary general of the Bukluran ng Manggagawang Pilipino in the 1990s, and has been the chairman of Partido ng Manggagawa since 2001. Since 2021, he has also served as co-convenor of 1Sambayan, a political organization that seeks to unite the nationwide opposition beginning with the 2022 elections.

== Early life ==
Renato Magtubo was born on December 12, 1959, in Davao City. In mid-1979, Magtubo moved by himself from Bacolod to Marikina, where he became a factory worker at Fortune Tobacco, then the largest cigarette manufacturer in the country.

== Political activity ==
Magtubo served as president of the Fortune Tobacco Labor Union in Marikina from 1986 to 2009.

In August 1993, Magtubo was among the 32 members of Kilusang Mayo Uno's Metro Manila–Rizal council who were suspended by chairman Crispin Beltran for their alleged "massive factionalism" in the organization; Magtubo noted that their suspension was due to their accusations of corruption among the KMU leadership. He was soon made secretary-general of the socialist labor center Bukluran ng Manggagawang Pilipino (BMP), founded in September 1993 by labor leader Filemon "Popoy" Lagman and based in Quezon City; he would later be succeeded by Leody de Guzman. Magtubo also served as secretary-general of the Kapatiran ng mga Pangulo ng Unyon sa Pilipinas (KPUP; lit. 'Brotherhood of Philippine Union Presidents') in the 1990s.

As a resident and labor leader in Marikina, Magtubo characterized his labor organizations' relationship to the city government under Mayor Bayani Fernando as more pragmatic and open to negotiation than the radical positioning they regularly took at the national level, resulting in a respectful tripartite relationship between the labor unions, the local government and local businesses that has been credited with achieving industrial peace in the city by the early 2000s. A statue of Magtubo's colleague Lagman would later be erected in Concepcion Uno, Marikina, within a year after his assassination in February 2001.

== Political career ==
=== House of Representatives of the Philippines (1998–2007) ===
Magtubo was elected representative of the party-list Sanlakas in 1998, serving until 2001. In 1999, he filed a bill seeking to prevent the use of torture by law enforcement.

In April 2000, Magtubo and Akbayan Representative Etta Rosales claimed that they and several other legislators received P500,000 of bribe money from Minority Leader Feliciano Belmonte Jr. and Speaker Manny Villar to pass the Omnibus Power Bill. Their exposure of the alleged "payola" led to an effort by Reps. Ernesto Herrera and Heherson Alvarez to start an investigation into the scheme, while other legislators called for Magtubo to instead resign for "damaging the House"; Albay 1st District Representative Krisel Lagman-Luistro, vice president of the Luzon chapter of Sanlakas, denied that there had been a payout for the bill. Herrera and Alvarez's proposed investigation was later rejected by the House Ethics Committee on May 16, and efforts to investigate the issue soon stalled after Magtubo refused to attend a May 30 meeting called by the committee, insisting that he would only speak before an independent investigative body. The bill would later be signed into law in June 2001 as Republic Act No. 9136, or the Electric Power Industry Reform Act (EPIRA).

In October 2000, amid the jueteng scandal of President Joseph Estrada that would later lead to his impeachment trial, Magtubo called on Estrada to resign and for Chief Justice Hilario Davide to institute a temporary government takeover in order to hold snap elections for a new administration. He would also call on Vice President Gloria Macapagal Arroyo to resign and participate in demonstrations to show her solidarity with anti-Estrada protesters. An impeachment complaint filed by lawyer Oliver Lozano against Vice President Arroyo was dismissed by Magtubo as a "comic sideshow" to the anti-Estrada movement. On December 17, 2000, Magtubo and other members of the All Resign Movement of the Workers (ARM the Workers) held a protest rally at the People Power Monument which they named "Pasada ng Masa, Biyaheng Edsa 2", with Magtubo stating that "Since Erap will not do a Fujimori, then let us force him to do a Marcos." By January 2001, Sanlakas participated in the demonstrations of EDSA II that ousted President Estrada from power, with Vice President Arroyo succeeding him.

Upon the assassination of Sanlakas founder Popoy Lagman on February 6, 2001, Magtubo took over as chairman of Partido ng Manggagawang Pilipino. The party-list Partido ng Manggagawa was established on the day of Lagman's funeral on February 12, in the same location of the assassination. In the aftermath of the EDSA III riots that occurred on May 1, 2001, Magtubo and BMP secretary-general Leody de Guzman, both of whom were PM nominees in the party-list election, led the Partido ng Manggagawa in protesting Arroyo's declaration of a state of rebellion in Metro Manila. In July 2003, Magtubo and six other party-list candidates in the 2001 election were proclaimed as congressmen upon a ruling by the Supreme Court, gaining a congressional seat as the party-list representative of Partido ng Manggagawa.

In October 2003, Magtubo and six other congressmen walked out of a speech by US President George W. Bush before the Batasan in opposition to his country's invasion of Iraq. In the same month, an impeachment complaint against Chief Justice Davide was initially signed by Magtubo and Sanlakas party-list representative Jose Virgilio Bautista, but they later withdrew their signatures along with four other legislators due to the apparent partisanship of the complaint.

After the Hello Garci scandal was reported in June 2005, Magtubo led rallies calling for Arroyo to step down as president and for a transitional government to take her place to hold new national elections, stating that it is "not just because of the 'Garci' tapes or the 'jueteng' scandal. She's been in power for four years, and she has implemented anti-worker policies." After some reluctance, he later signed the amended impeachment complaint initially filed by lawyer Oliver Lozano against President Arroyo in June, stating that while his partylist considered the impeachment to lack any solution for oppression and poverty, they still respected the constitutional process.

=== Interim years; further political activism (2007–2019) ===
Magtubo's Partido ng Manggagawa party-list did not succeed reelection in 2007, and was later also defeated in the 2010 election. Prior to the 2007 election, Magtubo noted that the labor vote in the Philippines has been difficult to organize due to varying and conflicting ideologies among labor leaders, with him supporting COMELEC chairman Christian Monsod's reform proposal for the party-list system. As a result of its two consecutive losses, Partido ng Manggagawa was delisted from COMELEC's registry of party-lists that can participate in elections, with Magtubo's newly proposed Partido ng Manggagawa Coalition later denied registration in July 2012.

A successor party-list, Partido Manggagawa (PM), participated in the 2016 and 2019 elections, but lost both times as well, resulting in the party-list being delisted in 2021. As chairman of Partido Manggagawa, Magtubo endorsed Estrada's reelection bid as mayor of Manila in 2016, calling him the only Manila mayor so far to "sincerely address" the concerns of the working class. In June 2019, Magtubo denounced the assassination of fourth PM party-list nominee Dennis Sequeña, stating that he is "a community leader and has no personal enemies. We believe this is an extrajudicial killing for Dennis' work as a labor organizer."

=== Marikina City Council (2019–present) ===
Magtubo ran for councilor of Marikina's second district in May 2019 under the Liberal Party, intending to switch with his wife Judy Magtubo, who at that point had served three terms as Liberal councilor in the district. Magtubo won a seat in the city council after placing fourth in the election. In March 2021, he joined 1Sambayan, a political organization that seeks to unite the opposition beginning with the 2022 elections, as a co-convenor.

In March 2025, Magtubo was among the three councilors who were not suspended by the Ombudsman amidst its ongoing investigation into alleged malversation of excess PhilHealth fund by the Marikina government, alongside twin councilors Rommel Acuña of the first district and Ronnie Acuña of the second district. Magtubo claimed that he had argued for PhilHealth funds to only be used for the city's health programs, but other councilors "did not favor" his view. He would later win reelection under the Lakas–CMD party for his third and final term as councilor, placing seventh in his electoral district.

== Personal life ==
Magtubo is married to Susana "Judy" Pinongcos Magtubo, a political activist and former information officer who served three terms as Liberal city councilor in Marikina's second district from 2010 to 2019. Magtubo resided in Parang, Marikina, in the early 2000s, and by the 2020s was residing in Nangka.
