= Partido ng Manggagawang Pilipino =

Filipino Workers' Party Partido ng Manggagawang Pilipino
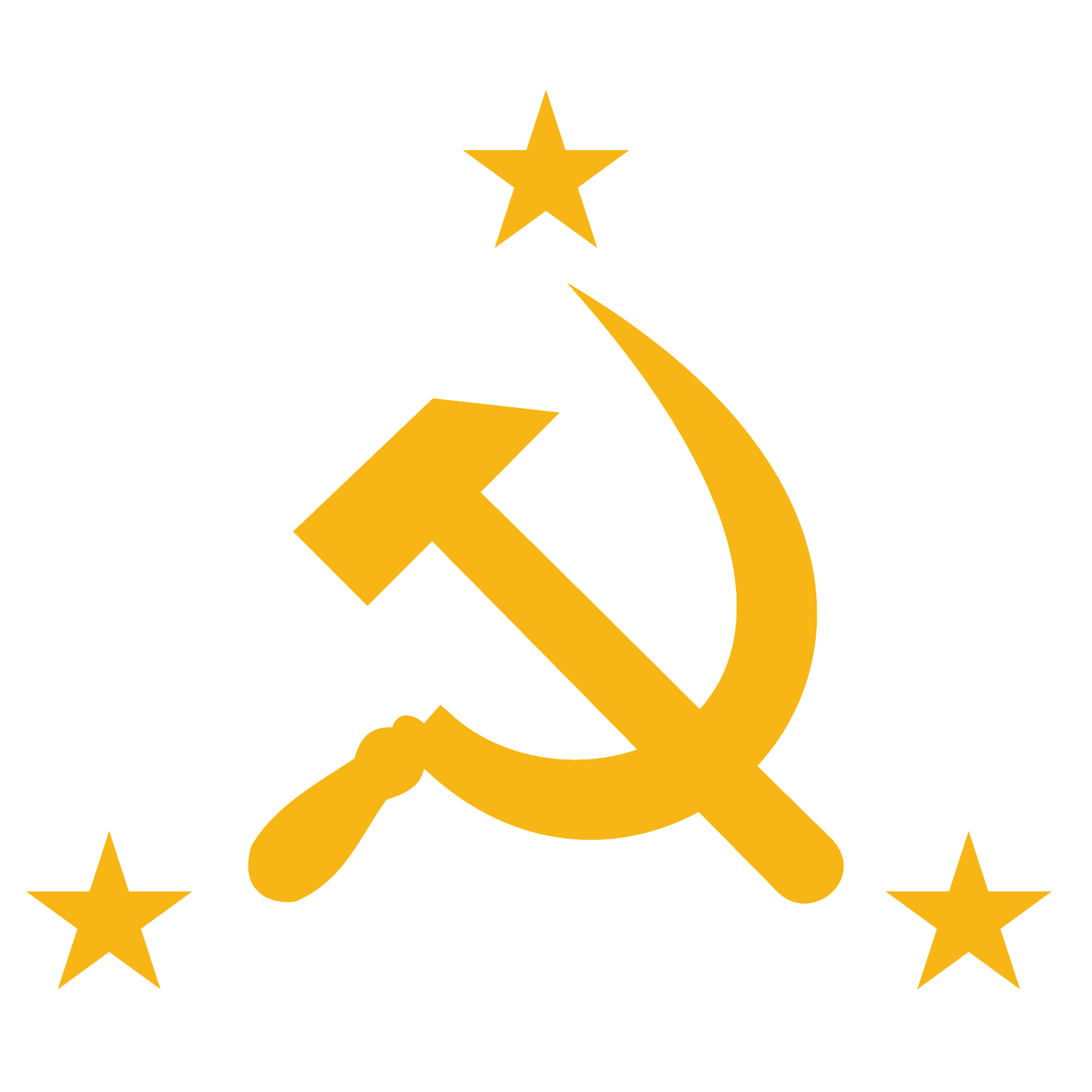
- Spokesperson: Clara Obrero (Melencio faction); Asa Proletaryo (Magtubo faction)
- Founded: August 5, 2002; 23 years ago
- Merger of: Partido ng Manggagawang Pilipino; Sosyalistang Partido ng Paggawa; Partido Proletaryo Demokratiko
- Newspaper: Manggagawa
- Ideology: Communism; Marxism-Leninism
- Political position: Left-wing to far-left
- Colors: Red

Party flag
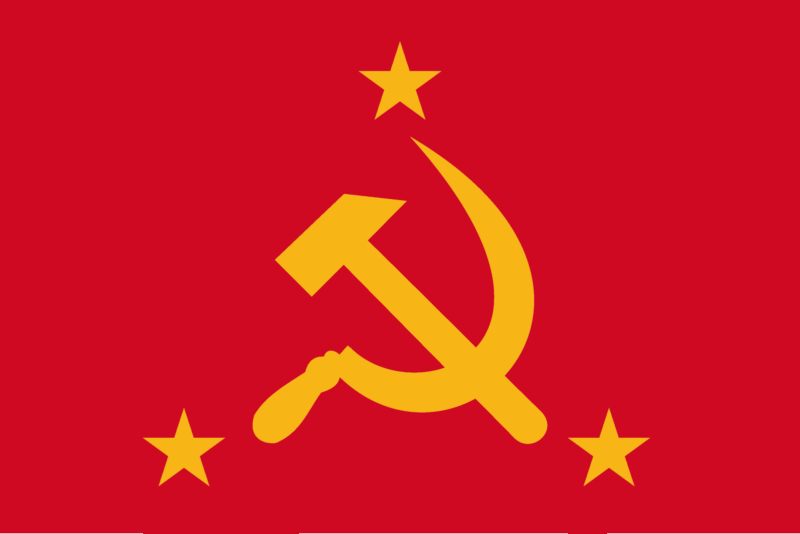

Website
- manggagawangpilipino.tripod.com

The Filipino Workers' Party (Filipino: Partido ng Manggagawang Pilipino, PMP) is a Marxist-Leninist communist party in the Philippines.

In a founding congress launched from 30 January to 5 February 1999, Popoy Lagman led the formation of the Partido ng Manggagawang Pilipino from the Manila-Rizal Revolutionary Committee (KRMR) which split from the Communist Party of the Philippines. Following his assassination in 2001, it later merged with Sonny Melencio's Sosyalistang Partido ng Paggawa (SPP), whose core group earlier broke with the KRMR in 1998 and the Partido Proletaryo Demokratiko (PPD) in 2002.

The PMP (Merger), as it was known in its early years, was beget with disunity which came into a breaking point in 2007, when the group around Melencio split the party, taking the aboveground mass organisations of Sanlakas, Bukluran ng Manggagawang Pilipino (BMP), and the Kongreso ng Pagkakaisa ng Maralitang Lungsod (KPML) with them, over the issue of nominees of the electoral party Partido ng Manggagawa led by chairman Rene Magtubo for the 2007 midterm elections. Both factions now claim the name Partido ng Manggagawang Pilipino for their own respective underground parties.
