= Laban ng Masa =

Leftist socialist coalition in the Philippines

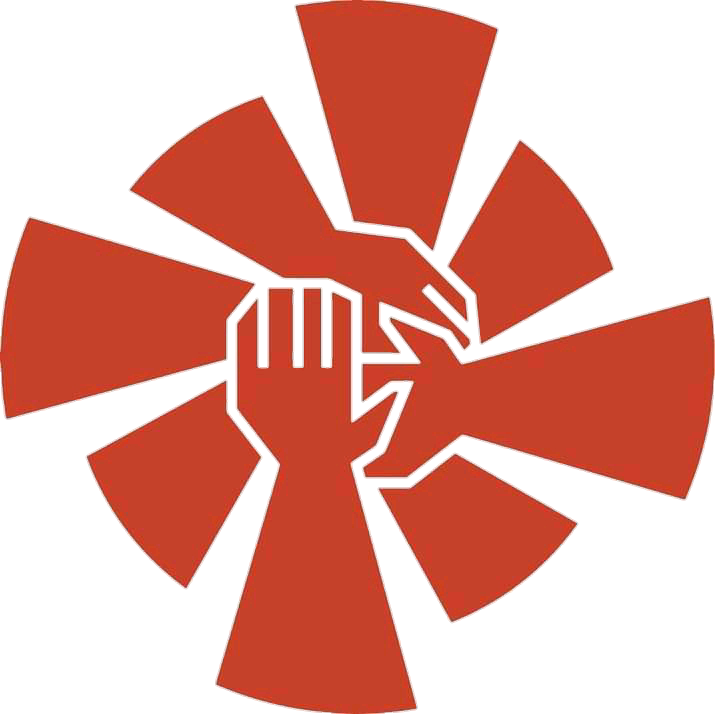
- Chairman: Walden Bello
- Founded: 29 June 2005 (Laban ng Masa I); 26 October 2017
- Headquarters: Quezon City, Philippines
- Ideology: Democratic socialism Progressivism; Anti-authoritarianism; Anti-capitalism; Anti-imperialism
- Political position: Left-wing
- Colors: Red

Laban ng Masa (LnM, lit. 'Fight of the Masses') was a major left-wing electoral coalition of democratic socialist and progressive groups in the Philippines. It was the revival of a broad-left coalition of the same name against then-president Gloria Macapagal Arroyo.

Being democratic socialist, LnM participated in the political processes of the state, and had opted on elections as a legitimate and viable means of achieving socialism. It opposed taking the extralegal route preferred and deemed necessary by Marxist–Leninist–Maoists. The coalition positions itself firmly against authoritarianism and elitism.

The coalition endorsed Leody de Guzman and Walden Bello in the 2022 presidential and vice-presidential elections. After the elections, some of its members formed an aboveground socialist party, the Partido Sosyalista (PS) in 2024.

== Coalition members ==
- Alab Katipunan
- Anihan ng Manggagawa sa Agrikultura
- Bangsa
- Bukluran ng Manggagawang Pilipino (BMP)
- Freedom from Debt Coalition (FDC)
- KAISA-UP
- Katarungan
- Kongreso ng Pagkakaisang Maralitang Lungsod (KPML)
- Metro East Labour Federation (MELF)
- Metro Manila Vendors' Alliance (MMVA)
- Oriang
- Pagkakaisa ng Manggagawa sa Transportasyon
- Partido Lakas ng Masa
- Pwersa LGBTQ
- Pwersa Riders Club 4
- Pwersa Women
- Pwersa Youth
- Rights
- Samahan ng Progresibong Kabataan (SPARK)
- Sanlakas
- Solidarity of Unions in the Philippines for Empowerment and Reform (SUPER)
- Teachers' Dignity Coalition
- Zone One Tondo Organisation

=== Coalition members during Laban ng Masa I ===
- Akbayan
- Alab Katipunan
- Alliance of Progressive Labor (APL)
- Anak Mindanao (AMIN)
- Bangsa
- Bukluran sa Ikauunlad ng Sosyalistang Isip at Gawa (BISIG)
- Bukluran ng Manggagawang Pilipino (BMP)
- Freedom from Debt Coalition (FDC)
- Kalayaan!
- Kilusan para sa Pambansang Demokrasya (KPD)
- Kilusang Mangingisda
- Partido ng Manggagawa (PM)
- Sanlakas
