= New People's Army =

Armed wing of the Communist Party of the Philippines

- Bagong Hukbong Bayan
- Seal of the New People's Army
- Founders: Jose Maria Sison; Bernabe Buscayno
- Leader: Unknown
- Dates active: 1969–present
- Split to: Alex Boncayao Brigade; Revolutionary Proletarian Army; Rebolusyonaryong Hukbong Bayan; Cordillera People's Liberation Army
- Headquarters: Mobile (previously Utrecht, Netherlands)
- Active regions: Government claim (2025): No active guerrilla fronts remaining CPP claim (2018): 110 guerrilla fronts across 73 provinces
- Ideology: Communism; Marxism–Leninism–Maoism; National Democracy
- Political position: Far-left
- Status: Active
- Size: Around 785 (NTF-ELCAC claim, 2025)
- Part of: Communist Party of the Philippines; National Democratic Front of the Philippines
- Wars: Communist armed conflicts in the Philippines; New People's Army rebellion; Philippine drug war
- Website: philippinerevolution.nu

The New People's Army (NPA; Filipino: Bagong Hukbong Bayan, BHB) is the armed wing of the Communist Party of the Philippines (CPP). It acts as the CPP's principal organization, aiming to consolidate political power from what it sees as the present "bourgeois reactionary puppet government" and to aid in the "people's democratic revolution". Founded on March 29, 1969, by the collaboration of Jose Maria Sison and former members of the Hukbalahap led by Bernabe Buscayno, the NPA has since waged a guerrilla war based on the Maoist strategy of protracted people's war. One of its famous members was Nelida Cabigayan. The NPA is the primary belligerent in the ongoing communist rebellion in the Philippines, the longest ongoing conflict in the country.

Historically based primarily in the Philippine countryside, the CPP–NPA's area of influence has fluctuated significantly. In 2018, the CPP claimed to operate in 73 out of the country's 81 provinces across over 110 guerrilla fronts. However, by August 2025, the Armed Forces of the Philippines (AFP) and the National Task Force to End Local Communist Armed Conflict (NTF-ELCAC) declared that there were no active guerrilla fronts remaining in the country, citing a reduction in NPA strength to fewer than 785 combatants.

In guerrilla zones where the NPA established control, the CPP–NPA created a People's Democratic Government (Gobyernong Bayan), which operated independently of the Philippine government. Within these zones, the NPA collected "revolutionary taxes" from businesses and residents to fund operations and community services.

The NPA, represented by the National Democratic Front of the Philippines (NDFP), was a party to peace talks with the Government of the Republic of the Philippines (GRP). Negotiations reached an impasse during the Rodrigo Duterte administration, which unilaterally terminated peace talks in 2019.

The Office of the President of the Philippines designated the NPA as a terrorist group, along with the CPP, in 2017. The United States and the European Union designated the CPP–NPA as "foreign terrorist organizations" in 2002 and 2005, respectively. Japan's Public Security Intelligence Agency also lists the NPA as a major international terrorist organization.

== History ==
=== Establishment ===
The New People's Army was established on March 29, 1969, following the split of the old Communist Party (Partido Komunista ng Pilipinas-1930) into Lava and Guerrero factions. The 1960s saw a resurgence in radical ideology following the establishment of Kabataang Makabayan and the emerging popularity of Mao Zedong Thought as an advancement of ideological Marxism-Leninism. In 1966, Jose Maria Sison, under the nom de guerre Amado Guerrero, wrote Rectify Errors and Rebuild the Party!, a treatise which criticized the old Lavaite leadership and emphasized the need to follow Mao Zedong Thought to foster re-establishment. The conflict continued until December 26, 1968, when the Communist Party of the Philippines was formally re-established along Maoist lines, and the entire issue was termed the First Great Rectification Movement.

After re-establishing the CPP, Guerrero set about establishing the People's Army. KM cadres in Tarlac had contacted Guerrero and linked him with Bernabe Buscayno, a former member of the older Hukbong Mapagpalaya ng Bayan. Relations were established and the New People's Army was formally founded on March 29, in continuity with the previous Hukbalahap. At the time, the NPA had only 60 armed fighters.

=== Initial activities ===
The NPA was immediately tasked with the role of implementing the CPP's program for a People's Democratic Revolution. In the Declaration of the New People's Army, Amado Guerrero outlined the following as its main tasks:

1. The New People's Army Must Engage in Party Rebuilding.
2. The New People's Army Must Carry Out Agrarian Revolution, Build Rural Bases, and Advance the Armed Struggle.
3. The New People's Army Must Build the National United Front.

The NPA quickly spread alongside organizational work of the CPP. By 1972, it had established 735 barrio organizing committees and 60 barrio revolutionary committees, governing an estimated 400,000 people all over the country. The CPP used the NPA to establish barrio organizing and revolutionary committees, which served as instruments in administering the people's revolutionary government. Barrio organizing committees were established to lower land rent, eliminate usury, and ensure the "annihilation of enemy troops and the elimination of landlord despots, enemy spies, and such bad elements as cattle rustlers, extortionists, robbers, murderers, arsonists, and the like." Once established, barrio revolutionary committees replaced the BOC to formally establish the area as a stronghold of the revolutionary government. The NPA at the time had 72 squads of 800 regulars armed with weapons.

=== Rapid expansion during the Martial Law era ===
Over the next decade, the NPA expanded in response to Ferdinand Marcos and the declaration of martial law in the Philippines. The CPP and the NPA were successfully able to establish themselves in the countryside, reaching a mass base of over one million people, with 1,000 fighters armed with high-powered rifles by 1977. By 1981, the NPA began engaging in tactical offensives involving company-sized units, particularly in the Southern Mindanao region. By 1983, the NPA fielded 5,000 high-powered rifles. By 1988, it had 10,000 high-powered rifles, with 7,000 inferior firearms. It operated in 60 guerrilla fronts across 63 provinces of the Philippines.

=== Changes in tactics and Kampanyang Ahos ===
The momentum gained in the 1980s was also given to multiple setbacks. Changes in strategy and internal conflicts within the CPP resulted in ideological, political, and organizational losses for the CPP–NPA–NDF. The CPP devised a plan called a "strategic counteroffensive" (SCO) with the aim of "leaping over" to a higher stage of armed revolution to quickly win the revolution. The SCO program led to "regularization" of units, urban partisan actions, peasant uprisings, and an insurrectionist concept of "seizing opportunities".

From 1981, the NPA enjoyed strategic gains in Mindanao and was able to consolidate its forces there. However, the Mindanao Commission adopted a strategy of designating areas as Red (where military struggle was applicable) or White (where political struggle and insurrection was applicable) along with the SCO program.

Problems in discipline also emerged during this time, as well as deterioration of the NPA's ability to conduct mass work. These ideological and organizational shortcomings, coupled with the Corazon Aquino administration's counter-insurgency program, Oplan Lambat Bitag, managed to severely harm the NPA and the CPP as a whole.

In 1989, the NPA assassinated U.S. Army Colonel James "Nick" Rowe, founder of the U.S. Army Survival, Evasion, Resistance and Escape (SERE) course. Colonel Rowe was part of a military assistance program to the Philippine Army. The NPA asserts that this made him a legitimate military target.

=== Second Great Rectification Movement ===
By 1991, the CPP central committee had assessed the mistakes of the previous decade and carried out the Second Great Rectification Movement from 1992 until declaring a success in 1998. The Second Great Rectification Movement, however, saw splits in the CPP ranks, with rejectionists such as Filemon Lagman, Romulo Kintanar, Etta Rosales, and others leaving the CPP and forming their own groups based on ideological differences. The Alex Boncayao Brigade, notorious for its partisan activities, left the CPP with Lagman and formed the Revolutionary Proletarian Army.

In 1998, the GRP and NDFP signed the Comprehensive Agreement on Human Rights and International Humanitarian Law (CAHRIHL), which establishes rules of engagement for both parties in accordance with international rules of war. The NPA, as a signatory to CAHRIHL, is bound to international agreements stated in the Geneva Convention and thus follows rules set for prisoners of war, command-detonated explosives, and similar rules of engagement.

Since then, rejectionists have been met with reprisals. Lagman was ambushed in the University of the Philippines in 2001 by gunmen and slain. The NPA has admitted to killing Kintanar in 2003.

=== Post-Rectification and decline (1998–present) ===
The CPP declared the Second Great Rectification Movement as having been "conclusively won" in 1998. Since then, it has re-affirmed that the CPP is in absolute command of the NPA, outlining that its most pressing task is to "defeat and destroy the US-created and US-supported reactionary Armed Forces of the Philippines."

Since then, it continued to wage a protracted people's war through the use of guerrilla tactics. In 2002, President Gloria Macapagal Arroyo requested the United States Department of State to declare the CPP-NPA as a foreign terrorist group, which was granted on August 2. This was in line with her counter-insurgency program, Oplan Bantay Laya, which aimed to end the conflict between the AFP and the NPA. In 2005, the European Union Common Foreign and Security Policy included the NPA as a terrorist group. Despite these efforts, the NPA declared Oplan Bantay Laya I a "failure", citing that it did not lose a single guerrilla front despite the AFP's efforts.

By 2017, the NPA strength had surpassed the previous 2005 peak by 3%, and in 2018, the Central Committee claimed to operate 110 guerrilla fronts. However, following the Bongbong Marcos administration's intensification of the NTF-ELCAC's localized peace engagements and military operations, the group's influence waned significantly in the 2020s.

In March 2022, Davao City was officially declared "insurgency-free" by Major General Nolasco Mempin of the Philippine Army's 10th Infantry Division due to the mass surrendering of New People's Army rebels after 12 of the top ranking leaders of the N.P.A's Southern Mindanao Regional Committee were captured in Kitaotao in January 2022. By August 5, 2025, the NTF-ELCAC and the Philippine Army affirmed President Marcos's declaration that there were no active NPA guerrilla fronts remaining in the Philippines. The government reported that the remaining NPA strength was approximately 785 members, down from thousands in previous decades, and that remaining members were scattered and no longer capable of holding territory.

=== Ceasefires ===
- On November 27, 1986, the Philippine government and rebels signed a 60-day ceasefire. This deal was rescinded in January 1987 following the events of the Mendiola massacre.
- The peace talks between the two sides were intermittent and inconclusive since 1986, bogging down in 2012. They resumed in August 2016, when Duterte released 19 rebel leaders from jail. However, President Duterte scrapped talks in February 2017, when rebels ambushed an army convoy, breaking a unilateral ceasefire that had held for five months.
- As of 2019, the Duterte administration unilaterally declared the end of peace talks between the GRP and the NDFP, focusing instead on their counter-insurgency program Oplan Kapanatagan and a "whole-of-nation" approach.

== Tactics ==
The NPA follows the Maoist tactic of the protracted people's war.

=== Historical tactics ===
In the early seventies, reacting to the heightened conflict under martial law, the NPA tried to establish "Yenan-style stable base areas", following the example of the CPP in the 1940s. The bases were completely destroyed by the AFP leading to necessary revisions in military tactics. By the end of 1974 a number of revisions were published by the CPP-NPA leadership, collectively known as the "Specific Characteristics of Our People’s War", which as historian Kathleen Wheely argues indigenized the original people's war strategy, adapting it to the Philippines' unique economic and geographical conditions.

== Ideology and policies ==
The NPA, being the primary organization of the CPP, follows a theoretical ideology of Marxism-Leninism-Maoism. It regards the Philippines as a semi-colonial, semi-feudal state where political and economic power is concentrated on a local class of landlords and comprador bourgeoisie, aided by foreign imperialists, chief of which is United States imperialism. The CPP regards a two-stage revolution of People's Democratic Revolution followed by socialist reconstruction as the path to achieve socialism.

=== Ideologies regarding armed struggle ===
The CPP regards armed struggle as a necessary component of revolution coinciding with the Party's organizational work. The NPA serves to achieve its central task of "destroying and dismantling the rule of the enemy and taking their political power". In waging armed revolution, the NPA follows the strategic line of protracted people's war by "encircling the cities from the countryside until conditions are ripe for seizing the cities through a strategic offensive".

The NPA identifies three stages in waging armed struggle: strategic defensive, strategic stalemate, and strategic offensive. For most of its history, the NPA regarded itself as being in the stage of strategic defensive.

=== Policies on LGBTQ+ members ===
The NPA has explicitly allowed the recruitment of sexual and gender minorities. Many queer Filipinos join the NPA due to the lack of LGBT rights in the Philippines, believing that queer liberation can only be achieved through a communist revolution. The CPP has recognized "the right to form same-sex relationships and changing one's gender" since 1992.

Same-gender marriage is permitted by the NPA. In 1998, the CPP released the document On Proletarian Relationship of the Sexes, which outlined how romantic relationships and marriages should work under the army. In 2005, the NPA conducted the first recorded gay marriage in the history of the Philippines.

== International relations ==
From 1979, the Soviet Union (USSR) provided political and financial assistance to the NPA before the USSR provided military assistance from 1984. It was reported that Vietnam was seeking to assist the NPA from 1984 to 1985.

It is reported that the NPA had supported the Naxalites (of India) during the Naxalite–Maoist insurgency by providing training and technical support.

The CPP-NPA received large-scale support, in the form of arms, $7 million and logistical support, from the Gaddafi government in Libya according to a US Secretary of State.

== Legal status ==
=== Under the Anti-Subversion Act of 1957 ===
At the time of its inception, the Government of the Philippines automatically outlawed the NPA (along with the CPP) through the Anti-Subversion Act of 1957, which had branded the Partido Komunista ng Pilipinas-1930 (PKP) and the Hukbalahap as an "organized conspiracy". As splinter groups which had roots to the PKP, the ban extended to the CPP-NPA.

=== Repeal of the Anti-Subversion Act ===
The Anti-Subversion Act of 1957 was repealed by President Fidel Ramos in October 1992, decriminalizing membership in the NPA and CPP.

=== Terrorist designation ===
In December 2017, President Rodrigo Duterte declared the NPA along with the CPP as terrorist organizations. The Anti-Terror Council of the Philippines formally designated CPP-NPA as a terrorist organization on December 9, 2020. However, on September 22, 2022, the Manila Regional Trial Court dismissed a proscription case by the Department of Justice seeking to designate the CPP-NPA as a terrorist organization, ruling that their acts constituted "rebellion" rather than terrorism.

== See also ==
- Communist rebellion in the Philippines
- Moro National Liberation Front
- Jose Maria Sison
- Government of the Republic of the Philippines - National Democratic Front peace negotiations
