= 2022 Philippine presidential election in Cavite =

- May 9, 2022
- Turnout: 81.30% ▲5.87 pp
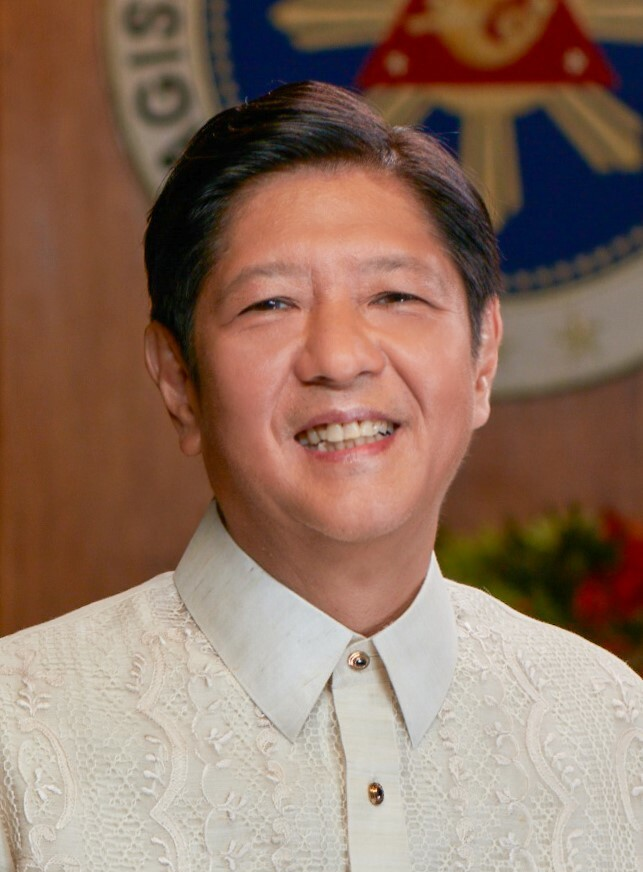

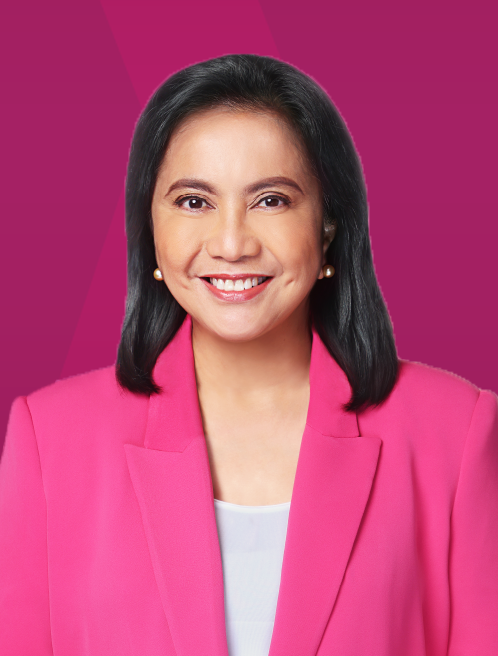
Candidate	Bongbong Marcos	Leni Robredo
Party	PFP	Independent
Running mate	Sara Duterte	Kiko Pangilinan
Popular vote	1,121,668	497,898
Percentage	60.90%	27.03%
Marcos
50–60%
60–70%
70–80%
- 2022 Philippine vice presidential election in Cavite
- May 9, 2022

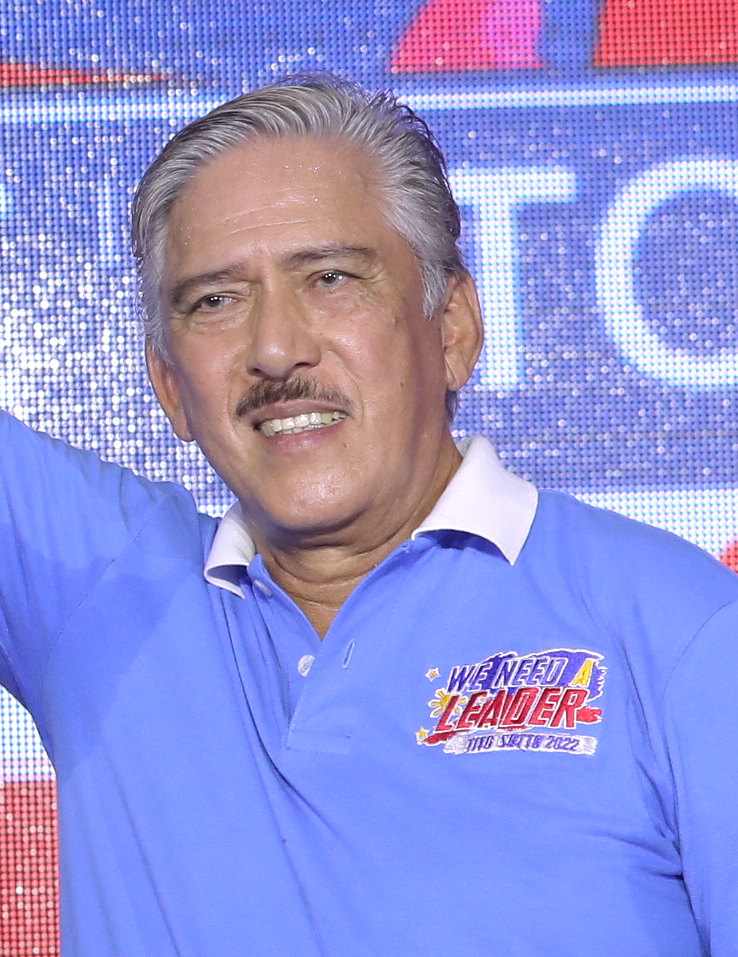
Candidate	Sara Duterte	Tito Sotto
Party	Lakas-CMD	NPC
Alliance	Uniteam	Lacson-Sotto
Popular vote	1,031,607	376,987
Percentage	56.50%	20.64%
Vice President before election
Leni Robredo
Liberal
Elected Vice President
Sara Duterte
Lakas

The 2022 Philippine presidential election results in Cavite reaffirm the province’s status as a bellwether in Philippine politics, showcasing the substantial backing for Ferdinand "Bongbong" Marcos Jr. and the significant challenges faced by his opponents. Despite being a native of Cavite, then Senator Panfilo Lacson was defeated by Marcos, who secured 1,121,668 votes—more than a million than Lacson’s 91,677 votes. Lacson placed third in the province, with incumbent Vice President Leni Robredo in second place, receiving 497,898 votes.

This outcome was anticipated in part due to Cavite Governor Jonvic Remulla's earlier pledge to deliver more than 800,000 votes for Marcos. However, Marcos's actual support in Cavite far surpassed this number, revealing a robust voter base that was well-established before the campaign even started.

For Robredo’s supporters, the significant margin between her and Marcos highlights the challenge of changing voter sentiment in a province known for its predictive electoral patterns. Despite efforts like large rallies and social media campaigns, these were not enough to counter the deep-rooted support for Marcos.

== Results ==
2022 Presidential election in Cavite
Party	Candidate	Votes	%
PFP	Bongbong Marcos	1,121,668	60.90%
IND	Leni Robredo	497,898	27.03%
PDR	Ping Lacson	91,677	4.98%
Aksyon	Isko Moreno	80,484	4.37%
PROMDI	Manny Pacquiao	40,054	2.17%
PLM	Leody de Guzman	2,485	0.13%
KTPNAN	Faisal Mangondato	2,378	0.13%
IND	Ernie Abella	1,899	0.10%
PDSP	Norberto Gonzales	1,746	0.09%
DPP	Jose Montemayor Jr.	1,476	0.08%
Total votes		1,841,765	100.00%

=== Result by municipality/city ===
Result per municipality / city
Municipality	Marcos		Robredo		Lacson		Moreno		Pacquiao		Various Candidates		Total Votes Cast
Municipality	Votes	%	Votes	%	Votes	%	Votes	%	Votes	%	Votes	%	Total Votes Cast
Alfonso	16,472	52.90%	9,873	31.71%	2,954	9.49%	1,105	3.55%	568	1.82%	167	0.54%	31,139
Amadeo	13,123	54.04%	7,730	31.83%	2,134	8.79%	898	3.70%	293	1.21%	104	0.43%	24,282
Carmona	27,042	57.11%	11,959	25.26%	6,050	12.78%	1,465	3.09%	655	1.38%	178	0.38%	47,349
City Of Bacoor	132,673	57.71%	72,106	31.36%	7,374	3.21%	11,172	4.86%	5,394	2.35%	1,185	0.52%	229,904
City Of Cavite	38,153	66.90%	11,675	20.47%	2,789	4.89%	3,427	6.01%	688	1.21%	301	0.53%	57,033
City Of Dasmariñas	205,592	61.89%	93,586	28.17%	9,799	2.95%	13,887	4.18%	7,182	2.16%	2,136	0.64%	332,182
City Of General Trias	86,956	62.45%	35,706	25.64%	7,274	5.22%	5,933	4.26%	2,789	2.00%	579	0.42%	139,237
City Of Imus	97,938	53.59%	62,342	34.11%	9,153	5.01%	9,318	5.10%	3,069	1.68%	949	0.52%	182,769
City Of Tagaytay	27,627	64.97%	11,136	26.19%	1,569	3.69%	1,265	2.98%	658	1.55%	266	0.63%	42,521
City Of Trece Martires	58,562	64.53%	20,910	23.04%	3,200	3.53%	4,257	4.69%	3,224	3.55%	598	0.66%	90,751
General Emilio Aguinaldo	9,354	67.27%	2,932	21.08%	941	6.77%	421	3.03%	186	1.34%	72	0.52%	13,906
General Mariano Alvarez	50,833	66.73%	15,956	20.95%	4,161	5.46%	3,446	4.52%	1,372	1.80%	408	0.54%	76,176
Indang	20,882	54.79%	10,774	28.27%	4,134	10.85%	1,543	4.05%	620	1.63%	163	0.43%	38,116
Kawit	31,550	63.36%	12,458	25.02%	2,241	4.50%	2,337	4.69%	974	1.96%	234	0.47%	49,794
Magallanes	8,599	63.71%	3,126	23.16%	1,036	7.68%	345	2.56%	321	2.38%	71	0.53%	13,498
Maragondon	17,025	62.91%	6,396	23.63%	2,272	8.40%	776	2.87%	462	1.71%	132	0.49%	27,063
Mendez	10,971	54.97%	6,467	32.40%	1,352	6.77%	787	3.94%	295	1.48%	86	0.43%	19,958
Naic	48,476	66.30%	14,217	19.44%	4,127	5.64%	3,235	4.42%	2,612	3.57%	452	0.62%	73,119
Noveleta	16,513	62.34%	6,401	24.17%	1,290	4.87%	1,732	6.54%	419	1.58%	133	0.50%	26,488
Rosario	41,335	62.76%	16,645	25.27%	3,053	4.64%	2,815	4.27%	1,442	2.19%	572	0.87%	65,862
Silang	74,628	61.29%	31,741	26.07%	8,242	6.77%	4,414	3.62%	2,207	1.81%	537	0.44%	121,769
Tanza	77,217	62.00%	31,175	25.03%	5,960	4.79%	5,508	4.42%	4,086	3.28%	593	0.48%	124,539
Ternate	10,147	70.91%	2,587	18.08%	572	4.00%	398	2.78%	538	3.76%	68	0.48%	14,310
Totals	1,121,668	60.90%	497,898	27.03%	91,677	4.98%	80,484	4.37%	40,054	2.17%	9,984	0.54%	1,841,765
