= Partido Lakas ng Masa =

Socialist and a Marxist-Leninist political party in the Philippines

- President: Leody de Guzman
- Chairman: Sonny Melencio
- Secretary-General: Elna Tamondong
- Founded: 2009
- Preceded by: Partido ng Manggagawa
- Headquarters: Quezon City
- Youth wing: PLM Youth and Students
- Ideology: Socialism; Marxism-Leninism; Socialism of the 21st century
- Political position: Left-wing to far-left
- National affiliation: Laban ng Masa
- Colors: Blue, red and black
- Senate: 0 / 24
- House of Representatives: 0 / 317

Party flag
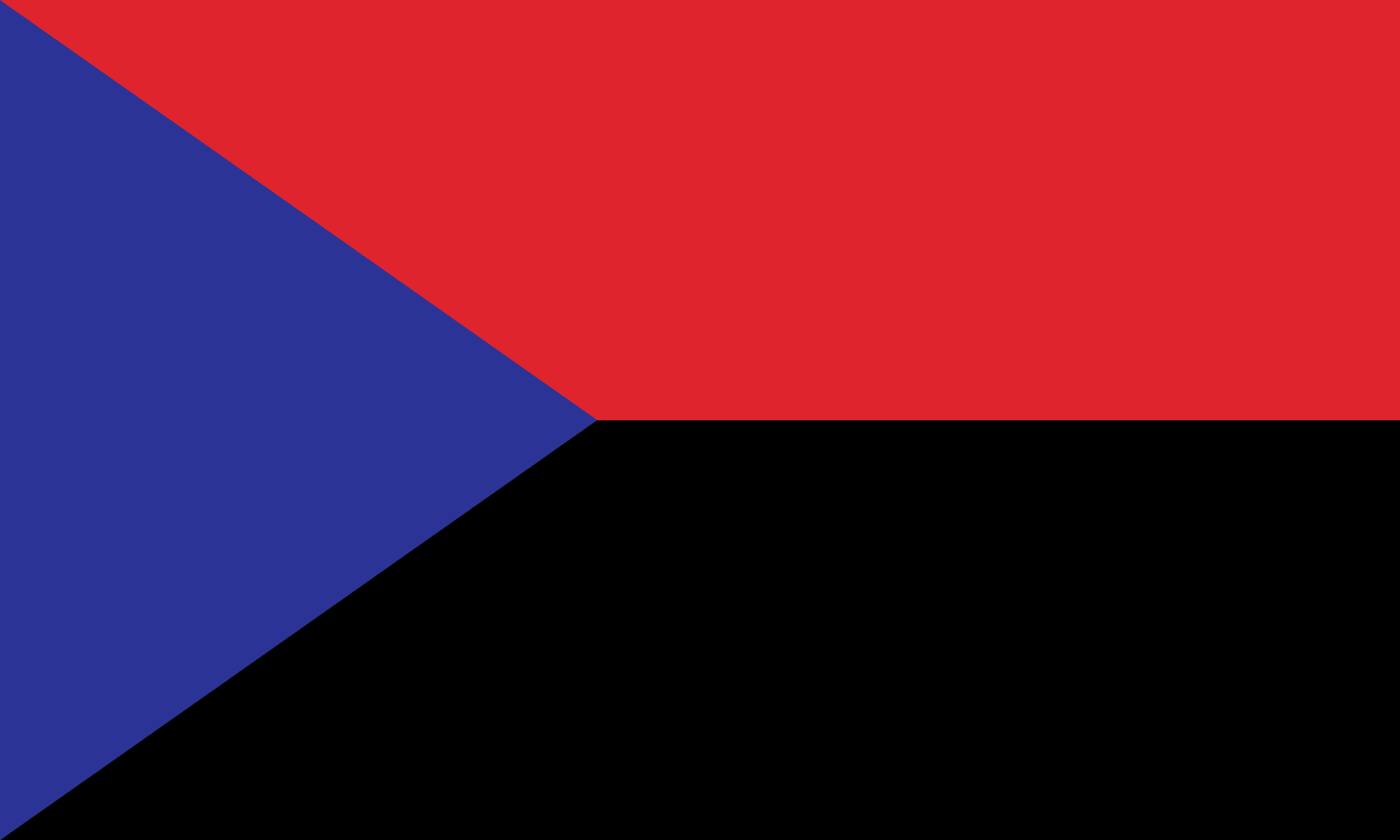

Website
- angmasa.org

The Partido Lakas ng Masa (PLM; transl. "Party of the Laboring Masses") is a socialist, Marxist-Leninist party in the Philippines. Created in 2009, it includes as its affiliate the labor group Bukluran ng Manggagawang Pilipino and multisectoral organization Sanlakas. It is the umbrella group of various organizations such as Zone One Tondo Organization (ZOTO) and Kongreso ng Pagkakaisa ng Maralita ng Lungsod (KPML).

The party fielded Leodegario "Ka Leody" de Guzman as its candidate for the 2022 presidential elections.

== Ideology and political positions ==
PLM functions as a multi-tendency organization, encompassing various socialist and left-wing tendencies.The PLM emerged from the Rejectionist Marxist-Leninist faction of the Partido ng Manggagawang Pilipino after the Second Great Rectification Movement. The PLM also advocates for the creation of a socialist government based on the structure of the cuban government.

PLM protested Israeli airstrikes on the Gaza Strip during the Gaza War; a party member remarked that the airstrikes were "Israel's 'Final Solution' to the Palestine people." PLM remained neutral on the issue of postponing the 2011 elections in the Autonomous Region in Muslim Mindanao (ARMM), as a postponement only served to benefit the Liberal Party, while holding the elections would've only promoted the status quo. Instead, the party "supports the continuation of the peace negotiations between the Philippine government and the MILF and any group fighting for self-determination in Mindanao." The party also disapproved of giving former president Gloria Macapagal Arroyo any special treatment against her criminal cases.

On the impeachment of Renato Corona, aside from agreeing that the Chief Justice should be impeached, the party said that members of the Supreme Court of the Philippines are to be selected democratically.

The PLM participates in the political processes of the state, recognizing that elections are a legitimate and viable means of achieving socialism. In the 2013 general election, the party supported Ricardo Penson's independent candidacy to the 2013 Senate election, as well as several candidates in local elections, including one candidate in the 2013 House of Representatives elections. For the 2022 general elections, the party fielded Ka Leody de Guzman for the Presidency, Walden Bello for the vice presidency, and Luke Espiritu, Roy Cabonegro, and David D'Angelo for the Senate.

=== Radio program ===
PLM produces the weekly radio program RADYO LAKAS NG MASA (Radio Program of the Labouring Masses) on Radyo Inquirer DZIQ 990 every Saturday from 9–10 AM.

== Electoral performance ==
=== For president ===
Election	Candidate	Number of votes	Share of votes	Outcome of election
2010	Did not participate			Did not participate
2016	Did not participate			Did not participate
2022	Leody de Guzman	93,027	0.17%	Lost

=== For vice president ===
Election	Candidate	Number of votes	Share of votes	Outcome of election
2010	Did not participate			Did not participate
2016	Did not participate			Did not participate
2022	Walden Bello	100,827	0.19%	Lost

=== Senate ===
Election	Candidates	Number of votes	Share of votes	Seats won	Seats after	Outcome of election
2010	Did not participate			0 / 12	0 / 24	Did not participate
2013	Did not participate			0 / 12	0 / 24	Did not participate
2016	Did not participate			0 / 12	0 / 24	Did not participate
2019	Leody de Guzman	893,506	0.25%	0 / 12	0 / 24	Lost
2022	Roy Cabonegro; David D'Angelo; Luke Espiritu	5,063,147	1.16%	0 / 12	0 / 24	Lost
2025	Leody de Guzman; Luke Espiritu	10,618,312	2.48%	0 / 12	0 / 24	Lost

=== House of Representatives ===
==== Congressional districts ====
Election	Popular vote	Share of votes	Seats	Outcome of election
2010	Did not participate		0 / 286	Did not participate
2013	10,196	0.04%	0 / 293	Lost
2016	Did not participate		0 / 297	Did not participate
2019	28,824	0.01%	0 / 304	Lost
2022	5,223	0.01%	0 / 316	Lost
2025	28,746	0.06%	0 / 317	Lost

==== Party-list ====
For party-list election results prior to 2019, refer to Sanlakas.

Election	Popular vote	Share of votes	Seats	Outcome of election
2019	28,824	0.10	0 / 61	Lost
2022	17,783	0.05	0 / 63	Lost
2025	Delisted			
