= Food Fight =

Food Fight may refer to:

- Food fight, a form of chaotic collective behavior in which food is thrown at others

== Film and television ==
- Foodfight! a 2012 animated film
- Food Fight (TV series), a 2000 Japanese television drama
- "Food Fight" (The Apprentice), a 2005 reality TV episode
- Food Fights, an episode of Celebrity Deathmatch
- Food Fight, an episode of The King of Queens
- Food Fight, an episode Mighty Morphin Power Rangers season 1

== Video games ==
- Food Fight (video game), a 1980s arcade game
- Food Fight, a character from Skylanders: Trap Team

== Other uses ==
- Food Fight: The Inside Story of the Food Industry, a 2004 book

== See also ==
- Food Fighters (disambiguation)
- Food Fighters (action figures), an action figure collection by Mattel
- Food Fighters (TV series), a 2014 NBC reality television competition series presented by Adam Richman
- Food for Fighters, a 1943 propaganda short
- Food riot
- Foo Fighters, an American rock band
- Food Battle (disambiguation)
- Food Wars (disambiguation)
