= 2022 Philippine presidential election in Batangas =

Batangas is the most voter-rich province

- May 9, 2022
- Turnout: 87.26% ▲4.67 pp
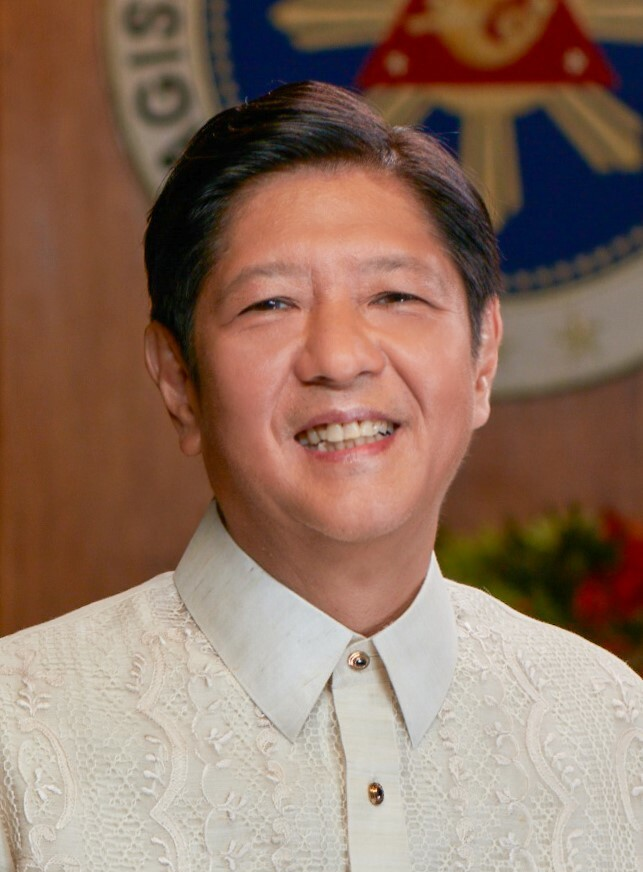

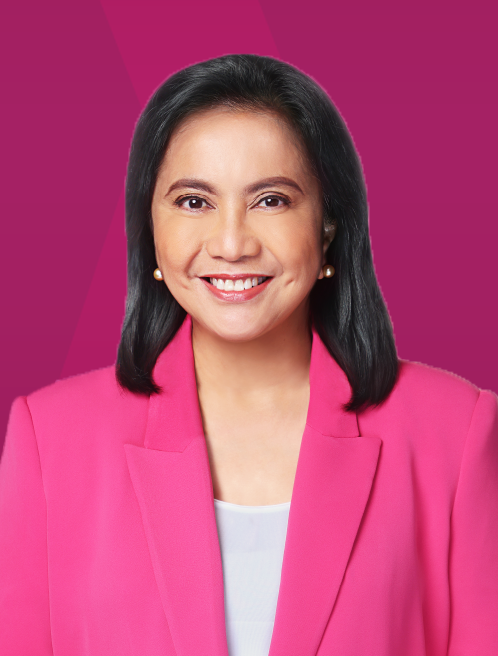
Candidate	Bongbong Marcos	Leni Robredo
Party	PFP	Independent
Alliance	Uniteam	TRoPa
Running mate	Sara Duterte	Kiko Pangilinan
Popular vote	719,971	656,166
Percentage	46.35%	42.25%

Marcos
30%–40%
40%–50%
50%–60%
60%–70%
70%–80%
Robredo
30%–40%
40%–50%
50%–60%
60%–70%
70%–80%
80%–90%
Lacson
30%–40%
Tie
- 2022 Philippine vice presidential election in Batangas
- May 9, 2022

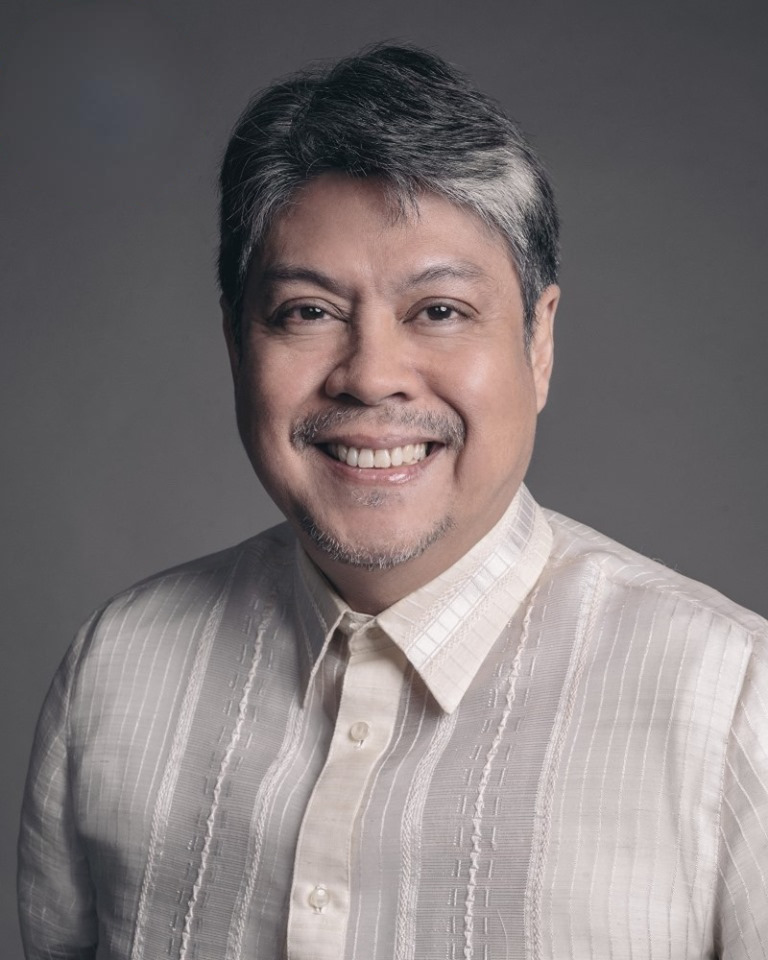
Candidate	Sara Duterte	Kiko Pangilinan
Party	Lakas-CMD	Liberal
Alliance	Uniteam	TRoPa
Popular vote	668,608	397,115
Percentage	43.98%	26.12%
Vice President before election
Leni Robredo
Liberal
Elected Vice President
Sara Duterte
Lakas

In the 2022 Philippine presidential election, former Senator Ferdinand "Bongbong" Marcos Jr. narrowly won the province of Batangas, defeating Vice President Maria Leonor "Leni" Robredo by a close margin of 4.11%. With Marcos securing 719,971 votes, this made Batangas the 6th closest province in terms of margin of victory. This result marked a significant shift from the 2016 vice-presidential race, where Robredo had won the province decisively by a 21% margin.

Robredo, despite her active efforts to replicate her 2016 success, faced stiff competition. While she campaigned extensively across the province, visiting Padre Garcia, Lipa City, Balayan, and Tanauan, Marcos was able to secure key victories. Out of Batangas' 34 municipalities and cities, Marcos won in 20, contributing significantly to his narrow margin of victory.

Robredo's campaign drew large crowds, with a rally in Bauan attracted approximately 280,000 attendees, underscoring her local popularity. She also received endorsements from religious leaders like the Council of Bishops of the United Church of Christ in the Philippines and 118 priests from the Archdiocese of Lipa,

However, local political dynamics were not entirely in her favor. Batangas political figures such as Batangas Representative Vilma Santos-Recto and Senator Ralph Recto, both former allies who supported her in 2016, endorsed Manila Mayor Francisco "Isko" Moreno in 2022. Their party, One Batangas, promised 1 million votes for Moreno, which likely fragmented the voting base and contributed to Marcos' ultimate success in the province.

Marcos' victory in Batangas illustrated a broader trend in the province, as voters swung in favor of his candidacy, contributing to his overall national victory.

== Results ==
2022 Presidential election in Batangas
Party	Candidate	Votes	%
PFP	Bongbong Marcos	719,971	46.35%
Independent	Leni Robredo	656,166	42.25%
Aksyon	Isko Moreno	88,559	5.70%
PDR	Ping Lacson	43,195	2.78%
PROMDI	Manny Pacquiao	36,290	2.34%
PLM	Leody de Guzman	2,361	0.15%
Independent	Ernie Abella	2,188	0.14%
PDSP	Norberto Gonzales	1,969	0.13%
KTPNAN	Faisal Mangondato	1,352	0.09%
DPP	Jose Montemayor Jr.	1,179	0.08%
Total votes		1,553,230	100.00%

=== Result by municipality/city ===
Municipality	Marcos		Robredo		Moreno		Lacson		Pacquiao		Various Candidates		Total Votes Cast
Municipality	Votes	%	Votes	%	Votes	%	Votes	%	Votes	%	Votes	%	Total Votes Cast
Agoncillo	11,382	48%	9,435	40%	869	4%	952	4%	987	4%	113	0%	10,070
Alitagtag	7,290	44%	7,219	44%	1,117	7%	443	3%	228	1%	90	1%	12,001
Balayan	21,498	44%	19,343	39%	2,014	4%	1,410	3%	4,394	9%	346	1%	14,380
Balete	6,245	47%	5,027	38%	1,182	9%	176	1%	516	4%	48	0%	16,289
Batangas City	80,201	44%	86,247	47%	8,659	5%	5,102	3%	2,953	2%	962	1%	45,002
Bauan	23,147	46%	21,204	42%	4,018	8%	1,018	2%	613	1%	202	0%	29,802
Calaca	21,720	42%	25,409	49%	2,181	4%	1,266	2%	1,314	3%	285	1%	22,604
Calatagan	12,447	43%	12,130	42%	2,128	7%	872	3%	1,233	4%	259	1%	44,500
City Of Lipa	91,643	48%	77,626	41%	13,484	7%	4,989	3%	2,703	1%	1,015	1%	38,678
City Of Santo Tomas	51,972	55%	32,653	34%	5,032	5%	2,468	3%	2,265	2%	576	1%	44,939
City Of Tanauan	65,462	55%	40,046	34%	5,426	5%	3,527	3%	2,757	2%	827	1%	9,498
Cuenca	10,755	48%	8,683	39%	1,827	8%	689	3%	406	2%	125	1%	22,139
Ibaan	14,479	41%	17,059	49%	1,756	5%	885	3%	583	2%	153	0%	32,736
Laurel	11,667	50%	8,596	37%	938	4%	705	3%	1,141	5%	108	0%	18,064
Lemery	19,934	43%	22,277	48%	2,403	5%	1,020	2%	990	2%	249	1%	47,015
Lian	14,534	48%	11,426	38%	1,859	6%	1,228	4%	938	3%	224	1%	70,686
Lobo	11,066	47%	9,659	41%	1,268	5%	564	2%	774	3%	135	1%	595,860
Mabini	13,141	48%	11,648	43%	1,074	4%	583	2%	484	2%	258	1%	209,851
Malvar	17,187	55%	10,898	35%	1,561	5%	886	3%	626	2%	161	1%	192,393
Mataas Na Kahoy	9,858	55%	6,611	37%	784	4%	470	3%	250	1%	70	0%	68,498
Nasugbu	32,797	48%	25,976	38%	3,807	6%	2,856	4%	1,847	3%	618	1%	126,243
Padre Garcia	10,384	37%	15,700	56%	861	3%	691	2%	350	1%	117	0%	100,321
Rosario	30,116	42%	33,394	47%	3,463	5%	2,111	3%	1,601	2%	490	1%	31,350
San Jose	19,410	42%	20,977	45%	3,456	7%	1,415	3%	706	2%	270	1%	74,954
San Juan	23,765	39%	28,222	46%	4,911	8%	1,997	3%	1,867	3%	345	1%	39,482
San Luis	9,575	44%	10,120	47%	1,075	5%	618	3%	259	1%	85	0%	45,984
San Nicolas	6,749	48%	5,550	40%	1,095	8%	253	2%	262	2%	70	1%	38,097
San Pascual	16,268	46%	15,463	44%	2,174	6%	863	2%	492	1%	147	0%	78,984
Santa Teresita	4,196	36%	5,960	52%	942	8%	221	2%	147	1%	35	0%	31,332
Taal	14,569	45%	15,059	46%	1,647	5%	619	2%	584	2%	167	1%	10,466
Talisay	11,943	47%	9,683	38%	2,199	9%	505	2%	752	3%	134	1%	69,874
Taysan	10,588	44%	10,616	44%	1,571	6%	867	4%	523	2%	173	1%	22,158
Tingloy	4,077	43%	4,621	49%	493	5%	113	1%	159	2%	41	0%	12,084
Tuy	9,906	41%	11,629	48%	1,285	5%	813	3%	586	2%	151	1%	33,252
Totals	719,971	46%	656,166	42%	88,559	6%	43,195	3%	36,290	2%	9,049	1%	1,553,230
