= Food Fighters =

Food Fighters may refer to:

- Food Fighters (action figures), released by Mattel in 1988
- Food Fighters (TV series), an American reality cooking show

== See also ==
- Food Fight (disambiguation)
- Food Fighter, a 2018 film by Ronni Kahn
- Foo Fighters, an American musical group
