= Philippine Marxist–Leninist Party =

Political party in the Philippines

Philippine Marxist–Leninist Party Partido Marxista–Leninista ng Pilipinas
- Founded: 7 November 2001; 24 years ago
- Split from: Revolutionary Workers' Party
- Armed wing: Partisans (Armed Operative of the Philippine Marxist–Leninist Party)
- Ideology: Communism; Marxism–Leninism
- Political position: Far-left

The Philippine Marxist–Leninist Party (Tagalog: Partido Marxista–Leninista ng Pilipinas, PMLP) is a communist party in the Philippines. Established in 2001 from the remnant of the Alex Boncayao Brigade known as the Bloke, which earlier broke from Popoy Lagman's Manila–Rizal Regional Party Committee and Arturo Tabara's Revolutionary Workers' Party.

Its armed wing, more known by its Tagalog name Partisano, conducts assassinations of government officials which are regarded as 'enemies of the people′ as a strategy for igniting a proletarian revolution in the country.

== History ==
=== Origin ===
The PMLP draws its membership from the rump Alex Boncayao Brigade, the former urban assassination unit of the Communist Party of the Philippines in Metro Manila and Rizal during the 1980s and the early 1990s. This rump group, which is mostly based in Malabon, Valenzuela, and Manila, took the name of Metro Manila–Rizal Regional Party Committee and eventually established the PMLP in a founding congress which lasted from 7 to 10 November 2001. They later renamed themselves in a majority vote to Partisans (Partisano) and became the armed component of the new party, now collectively known as PMLP–Partisano. A report by the RPM-P in 2004 claimed that a large portion of the PMLP's membership has since rejoined the former.

== Ideology ==
The PMLP espouses the Manila–Rizal Regional Party Committee's distinct variation of the politico–military strategy originally used by the National Liberation Front of Vietnam during the Vietnam War. First implemented during the last quarter of 1988, it envisions a combination of political struggle and military struggle in order to build a broad network of supporters and sympathisers for urban partisan warfare. This type of warfare takes the form of assassinations, expropriations, and other punitive acts in order to encourage a mass action in the urban areas, which is often crticised as 'insurrectionary' and 'ultra-leftist' by other Philippine communists.
