= Trining Herrera-Repuno =

- Born: June 8, 1941
- Died: April 19, 2025 (aged 83)

Trinidad "Trining" Herrera-Repuno (June 8, 1941 – April 19, 2025) was a Filipino human rights advocate and urban poor leader. She was a prominent survivor of the dictatorship of Ferdinand Marcos, during which she was head of the Zone One Tondo Organization, which pursued land rights and decent housing for the urban poor in the Philippines. Later in life, she played a key part in the formation of Samahan ng Ex-Detainees Laban sa Detensyon at Aresto (SELDA), an organization of former political detainees which she became chair of in 2017.

== Life ==
Herrera worked as a stenographer and as a travel agent.

She became involved with ZOTO from its founding in 1970. In 1973, she and her husband, a truck driver, participated in a squat in Manila. Herrera entered hiding beginning in January 1966, due to fears of being targeted by martial law authorities.

In April 1977, Herrera was arrested in Quezon City on charges of illegal assembly; it was her third arrest. She was interrogated at Camp Crane and subsequently tortured; after two hours of torture, she falsely confessed to owning subversive magazines. She was transferred to the Bicutan Rehabilitation Center on 5 May 1977. She was released on 14 May on the orders of Ferdinand Marcos, in response to U.S. congressional hearings on human rights abuses in the Philippines.

By 1979, Herrera was "underground" following threats of subversion charges.

Herrera testified about her experiences of torture in 1992.

== See also ==
- Martial law under Ferdinand Marcos
- Human rights abuses of the Marcos dictatorship
- Political detainees under the Marcos dictatorship
