= Second Great Rectification Movement =

1992 ideological campaign by the Communist Party of the Philippines

The Second Great Rectification Movement refers to a 1992 ideological campaign initiated by the leadership of the Communist Party of the Philippines (CPP) wherein an effort was made to "identify, repudiate and rectify the errors of urban insurrectionism, premature big formations of the New People's Army and anti-infiltration hysteria". The rectification movement resulted in the once monolithic Filipino communist party fragmenting into at least eight warring factions during the 1990s.

Luis Jalandoni, formerly a negotiator for the National Democratic Front of the Philippines, has stated that from 1985 until 1991, a renegade group within the party leadership of the CPP was responsible for major errors that caused serious losses in the revolution's mass base. These errors included the implementation of a program to root out infiltrators called Kampanyang Ahos ("Kahos") and the adoption of an erroneous political line brought about by modern revisionism. The loss in mass base was estimated to be 50%–60% in Mindanao alone. The "Second Great Rectification Movement" was meant to correct these errors.

== Background ==
The Revolutions of 1989, punctuated by the fall of the Berlin Wall, the collapse of the communist states in Eastern Europe the following year and the subsequent dissolution of the Soviet Union on December 26, 1991 was the state of world affairs at the time when Armando Liwanag (cadre name adopted by Jose Maria Sison, though never admitted by Sison himself) of the Communist Party of the Philippines Central Committee published a document entitled "Reaffirm our Basic Principles and Rectify Errors". The historical reference to a similar document that gave rise to the First Great Rectification Movement was recognizable, implying that the party needed evaluate its strengths and weaknesses, and make decisions regarding its future. The tone set suggested that the party's situation was critical, so much so that "extraordinary measures were required to rectify it".

=== Reaffirmation of basic principles ===
Liwanag states that the party needed to reaffirm the basic principles laid down in its 1968 congress; these included, among others:

- repudiation of modern revisionism,
- adherence to theory of Marxism-Leninism,
- the view that Philippine society is semi-feudal and semi-colonial,
- pursuing the general line of New Democratic revolution,
- the leading role of the working class through the Party,
- the theory of People's war and encircling cities from the countryside,
- democratic centralism, socialism and proletarian internationalism

=== Rectification of errors ===
Liwanag then states that the wrong directions taken by various elements in the revolutionary movement were due to modern revisionism at that time; "adulating Mikhail Gorbachev on a simplistic notion of anti-Stalinism" was mentioned. On the whole, the document identified trends in thinking that led to certain "errors", so that those who were responsible for those errors would be pressured into admitting their mistakes; anyone who had been in error but refused to admit it were either to leave or be thrown out.

== Consequences ==
"Reaffirm our Basic Principles and Rectify Errors" was dated December 26, 1991, to coincide with the CPP's 23rd founding anniversary, but was not approved as official party policy by the Central Committee until approximately six months later, when the committee met in its 10th Plenum in mid-1992. The publication of the document sparked the "Second Great Rectification Movement". It caused a divide among the communist party; those who agreed with the views expressed in "Reaffirm our Basic Principles and Rectify Errors", thereafter referred to as "reaffirmists", and those who disagreed with these views, who were labelled "rejectionists". The "rejectionists" were then considered "counter-revolutionaries".

=== Split ===
Among those labelled "counter-revolutionaries" by Sison were Romulo Kintanar, former chief of the New People's Army, Arturo Tabara, a former head of the Visayas Commission, Filemon Lagman, who would later form the Bukluran ng Manggagawang Pilipino (Solidarity of Filipino Workers), Ricardo Reyes, former editor of Ang Bayan, the news organ of the CPP and highly-placed in the Mindanao Commission, and Benjamin de Vera, a former member of the Central Committee. "Rejectionist" regional party committees included those of Metro Manila-Rizal, Central Mindanao, Western Mindanao, the Visayas Commission (VisCom), National United Front Commission (NUFC), Home Bureau of the International Liaison Department and the National Peasant Secretariat (NPS).

Notable among the "rejectionist" bloc was the Revolutionary Workers' Party formally established in 1998. Its armed wing is known as the Revolutionary Proletarian Army – Alex Boncayao Brigade.

=== Assassinations ===
Romulo Kintanar was charged before a "People's Court" in 1993 for various crimes including illegal abuse of authority, criminal activities such as kidnapping for ransom, stashing away Party funds and instigating Tabara and Lagman to go against the policies of the revolutionary movement. Ricardo Reyes was accused of culpability for "Kampanyang Ahos" by Jose Maria Sison. Kintanar, Reyes, Filemon Lagman and Arturo Tabara were reportedly handed death sentences by their former comrades.

Lagman was ambushed by four gunmen in 2001; he died from bullet wounds to the head. Kintanar was assassinated by two gunmen in Quezon City in 2003. The New People's Army admitted to killing him. Tabara was shot and killed by suspected communist rebels in Manila in 2004. In 2005, the New Internationalist reported that the December 2004 issue of the CPP organ Ang Bayan published a list of 15 individuals who had been labelled "counter-revolutionaries"; the list included Lagman, Tabara, Reyes, Walden Bello and Etta Rosales. A 2005 International Viewpoint report states that approximately 27 Left activists had been killed by the New People's Army, while nine have escaped assassination attempts. The National Democratic Front of the Philippines has issued a statement denying this report, which it characterized as slanderous and Trotskyist. Jose Maria Sison claimed that CPP did not assassinate anyone but simply tried to arrest them.

Benjamin De Vera died of a heart attack in 2007. Ricardo Reyes continues as a leftist politician, mounting a campaign for the Mayoralty of his hometown, Pasig during the 2010 Philippine general election.

== See also ==
- First Great Rectification Movement
- Yan'an Rectification Movement
