= Food Wars =

Food Wars may refer to:

- Food Wars (American TV series), television program on the Travel Channel
- Food Wars!: Shokugeki no Soma, a Japanese manga written by Yūto Tsukuda and illustrated by Shun Saeki, also made into an anime series.
- The Food Wars, a 2009 book by Walden Bello

== See also ==
- Food Battle (disambiguation)
- Food fight (disambiguation)
- Food riot
