= Barnyard Commandos =

Action figure line

- Type: Action figures
- Invented by: James Groman (American Greetings Corporation)
- Company: Playmates Toys
- Country: United States
- Availability: 1989–90
- Materials: Plastic
- Features: Barnyard Commandos

Barnyard Commandos is an action figure line created by toy designer James Groman for American Greetings Corporation and produced by Playmates Toys in 1989.

A four-episode French-American animated series was based on the figures the following year. Produced by Murakami-Wolf-Swenson and the French company IDDH, it features the vocal talents of S. Scott Bullock, Thom Bray, Pat Fraley, Paul Kreppel, John Mariano, Bob Ridgely, Lennie Weinrib, and Danny Wells. The series, however, was not successful enough to merit further production of episodes.

== Plot ==
The property is based around the concept of farm animals who consumed radioactive materials left over from an abandoned military experiment, mutating them into hyper-intelligent, anthropomorphic paramilitary troops. This consists of two "hilariously harmless" opposing teams: the R.A.M.S. (Rebel Army of Military Sheep) and the P.O.R.K.S. (Platoon of Rebel Killer Swine).

== Revival ==
In 2020, CloudCo planned to produce a new Barnyard Commandos figures in partnership with Megalopolis Toys. Five years later, Nacelle acquired the property with plans for a new toyline, comic book, and animated series.

== Action figures ==
Two series of Barnyard Commandos were produced, each including several figures from both teams. Similar to Mattel's Food Fighters, the figures are non-poseable and made of soft, hollow plastic much like squeaky toys. They each include a weapon accessory that fastens onto the figure and a brief, humorous character description on the cardback.

Burger King also produced a series of tie-in toys as Kids' Meal premiums.

=== Series 1 ===
==== R.A.M.S. ====
- Sergeant Woolly Pullover
- Commodore Fleece Cardigan
- Major Legger Mutton
- Pilot Fluff Pendleton

==== P.O.R.K.S. ====
- General Hamfat Lardo
- Private Side O'Bacon
- Sergeant Shoat N. Sweet
- Captain Tusker Chitlins

=== Series 2 ===
==== R.A.M.S. ====
- Master Sergeant Cornelius Cannonfodder
- Private Bull Bellwether
- Commander Missiles Muttonchop
- Lieutenant Sureshot Shearling

==== P.O.R.K.S. ====
- Corporal Hy Ondahog
- Staff Sergeant Blaster McBacon
- Major Piggyback Gunner
- Captain Hogg Wilde

=== Vehicles ===
- Bacon Bomber
- Pork Chopper
- Pork-A-Pult
- Ram Tank

== Home media ==
Only four episodes of the series were released to four NTSC VHS tapes with one episode each:

- "Apple-Calypse Now"
- "Back to the Farm"
- "Treasure of Ram Pork Mountain"
- "Ultimate Quest"
