= Revolutionary Workers Party – Mindanao =

Revolutionary Workers Party – Mindanao Rebolusyonaryong Partido ng Manggagawa – Mindanao
- Abbreviation: RPM-M
- Founded: 2001
- Split from: Revolutionary Workers' Party
- Ideology: Communism; Marxism; Leninism; Trotskyism
- Political position: Left-wing
- International affiliation: Fourth International

Website
- www.grenzeloos.org/jl/

The Revolutionary Workers Party – Mindanao (Rebolusyonaryong Partido ng Manggagawa – Mindanao (RPM-M)) is a Trotskyist political party in the Philippines. The party was originally the Mindanao branch of the Revolutionary Workers' Party (RWP), an anti-administration armed party.

In 2001, the RWP held ceasefire talks with the Filipino government. The Mindanao branch held different opinions than then the RWP leadership and left the party, founding the RPM-M. The party joined the Fourth International in 2003, becoming the Filipino branch of the organization. The party reached total ceasefire with the Filipino government in 2005.
