= Food Battle =

Food Battle may refer to:

- Food Battle Club, a Japanese competitive eating competition
- Food Battle, a YouTube series by Smosh

== See also ==
- Food fight
- Food riot
- Food Wars (disambiguation)
