= Nelida Cabigayan =

Filipino military personnel

Nelida Cabigayan (a.k.a. Commander Lina) was a member of the New People's Army who fought the dictatorship of Ferdinand Marcos in the Philippines. She was active in NPA for two years in the early 1970s, and became regarded as folk hero. She surrendered in 1974, and act that was considered as a major coup of the Marcos' government.
