= Food Battle Club =

Japanese television series

Food Battle Club (フードバトルクラブ) is a Japanese competitive eating television program by Tokyo Broadcasting System (TBS). Due to a death caused by a bread-eating contest the show was canceled.
