= The Food Wars =

- Author: Walden Bello
- Language: English
- Publication date: 2009

The Food Wars is a 2009 book by Walden Bello which examines the food crisis and issues relating to food security.

It was originally published on 25 September 2009, ISBN 978-1-84467-331-5.
