= Partido Manggagawa =

Progressive party-list in the Philippines

- Chairman: Rene Magtubo
- Secretary-General: Judy Ann Miranda
- Founded: February 12, 2001; 25 years ago (as Partido ng Manggagawa)
- Headquarters: 15 Clarion Lily St., St. Dominic Subdivision, Project 6, 1106 Quezon City, Philippines
- Newspaper: Manggagawa Naman!
- Youth wing: Partido Manggagawa–Kabataan (PM–K)
- Ideology: Socialism; Progressivism
- Political position: Left-wing
- National affiliation: 1Sambayan (2021-present); NAGKAISA! (2012-present); Laban ng Masa I (2005)
- Colors: Red Blue
- Slogan: Manggagawa, ito ang ating partido. Partido Manggagawa! (transl. Worker, this is our party. The Workers' Party!)
- Senate: 0 / 24
- House of Representatives: 0 / 317

Website
- partidongmanggagawa2001.blogspot.com

Partido Manggagawa (PM, lit. 'Workers' Party') is a progressive labor party-list in the Philippines founded in 2001.

== History ==
Partido ng Manggagawa was officially launched on February 12, 2001, the same day that one of its convenors, socialist labor leader Filemon "Ka Popoy" Lagman, was laid to rest days following his assassination. By that time, it was affiliated with another party-list, Sanlakas.

In the 2001 party-list elections, Partido ng Manggagawa gathered enough votes to gain a seat in the House of the Representatives for its first representative, labor organizer Rene Magtubo. Magtubo was able to retain his seat at the subsequent 2004 party-list elections.

In 2007, after electoral defeat by both Partido ng Manggagawa and Sanlakas in the party-list elections, the former split from the latter, over the issue of party-list nominees by PM. Partido ng Manggagawa then became a separate organization from Sanlakas, Bukluran ng Manggagawang Pilipino, and other affiliates. PM was also delisted as a party-list after losing in the following 2010 elections.

In 2012, Magtubo attempted to register a new party-list, the Partido ng Manggagawa Coalition, but was denied registration by COMELEC. The party-list then became known as Partido Manggagawa for the 2016 and 2019 party-list elections.

Currently, Partido Manggagawa is affiliated with several organizations, including NAGKAISA! Labor Coalition, 1Sambayan, and the labor union Sentro ng Mga Nagkakaisa at Progresibong Manggagawa (SENTRO).

== Electoral performance ==
Election	Votes	%	Seats
2001	216,823	3.32%	1
2004	448,072	3.52%	2
2007	119,082	0.74%	0
2010	140,257	0.47%	0
2013	Delisted		
2016	42,742	0.13%	0
2019	28,351	0.10%	0

== Representatives to Congress ==
=== As Partido ng Manggagawa ===
Period	1st Representative
12th Congress; 2001–2004	Rene Magtubo
13th Congress; 2004–2007	Rene Magtubo
14th Congress; 2007–2010	Out of Congress
15th Congress; 2010–2013	Out of Congress

=== As Partido Manggagawa ===
Period	1st Representative
17th Congress; 2016–2019	Out of Congress
18th Congress; 2019–2022	Out of Congress

== See also ==
- Sanlakas
- Partido Lakas ng Masa
- Bukluran ng Manggagawang Pilipino
