= Walden Bello =

Filipino academic and politician

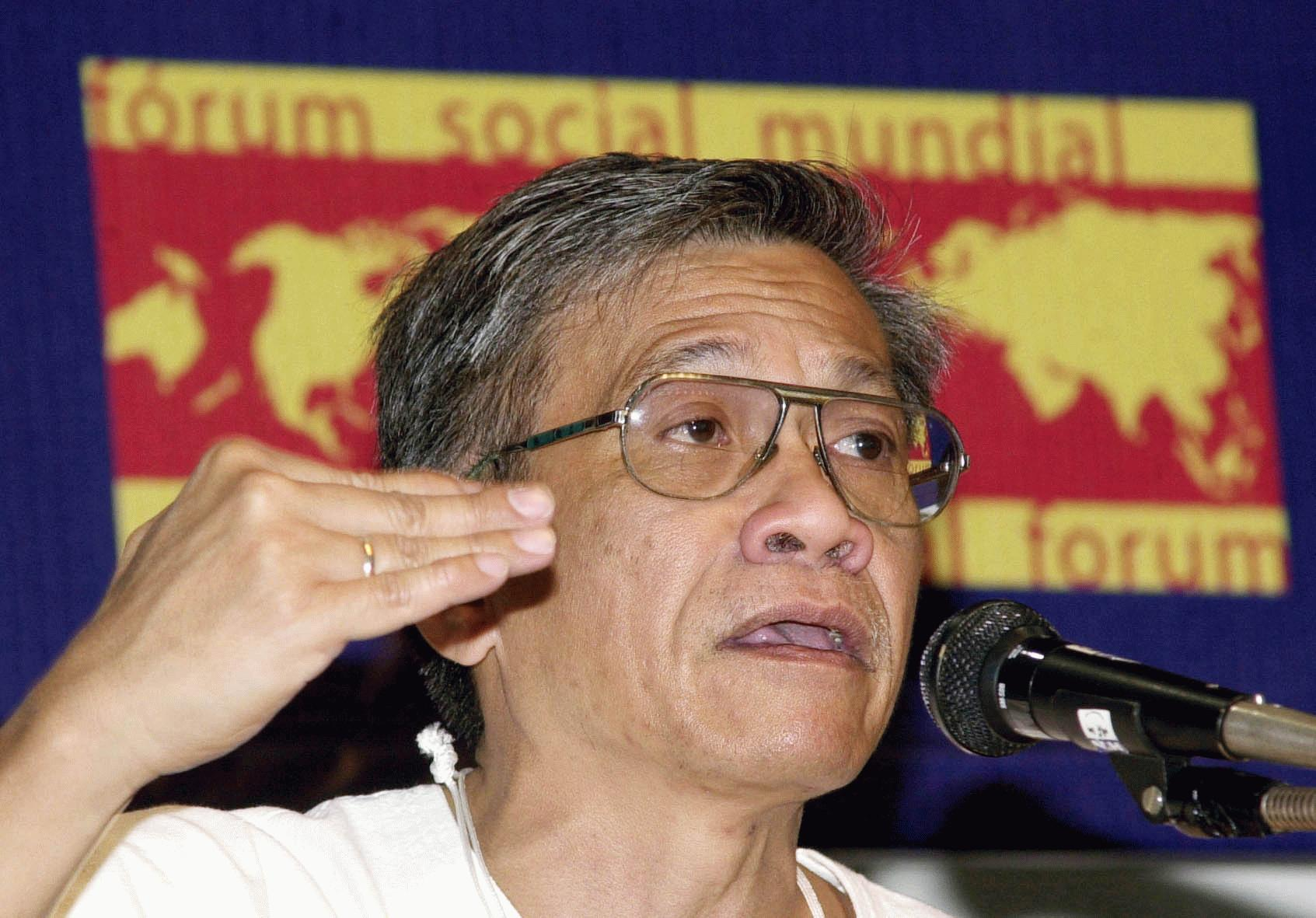
- Bello in 2003

Member of the Philippine House of Representatives for Akbayan Partylist
- In office June 30, 2007 – March 16, 2015 Serving with Risa Hontiveros (2007–2010), Kaka Bag-ao (2010–2013), and Barry Gutierrez (2013–2015)
- Preceded by: Dr. Mario Aguja; Etta Rosales
- Succeeded by: Angelina Ludovice-Katoh

Personal details
- Born: Walden Flores Bello; November 11, 1945 (age 81) Cardona, Rizal, Philippine Commonwealth
- Party: PLM (2021–present)
- Other political affiliations: Independent (2015–2021); Akbayan (1998–2015); CPP (1970s–late 1990s)
- Spouse: Suranuch Thongsila (m. 2015; died 2018)
- Parent(s): Luz Flores; Jesse Bello
- Education: Ateneo de Manila University (BA); Princeton University (PhD)
- Occupation: Activist, writer
- Profession: Environmentalist
- Awards: Right Livelihood Award
- Website: www.waldenbello.org

Walden Flores Bello (born November 11, 1945) is a Filipino academic who served as a member of the House of Representatives of the Philippines. He is an international adjunct professor at Binghamton University, professor of sociology and public administration at the University of the Philippines Diliman, and executive director of regional policy think-tank Focus on the Global South. Bello is also the founder and chairperson of the left-wing alliance Laban ng Masa. (lit. Fight of the Masses)

On October 20, 2021, Bello filed his candidacy for vice president in the 2022 Philippine elections as the running mate of presidential candidate and labor leader Leody de Guzman. Their platforms focus on progressive, democratic socialist, and pro-poor systemic change.

== Early life and career ==
Bello was born in Cardona, Rizal, to Luz Flores and Jesse Bello from Ilocos Norte and Ilocos Sur provinces, respectively. His family paid for his Jesuit schooling at the Ateneo de Manila University. During his stay in the Ateneo, he served as the editor-in-chief of The GUIDON in 1965. Subsequently, he attended graduate school at Princeton University. While attending Princeton in the United States, he was introduced to the anti-war movement and led an occupation of the Woodrow Wilson Center. The confrontation with police during these protests radicalized Bello and inspired him to pursue a life of activism. For his graduate studies, he traveled to Chile and stayed in shanty towns following Salvador Allende's socialist rise to the presidency.

When he returned to the United States to defend his dissertation, he lost his ability to return to the Philippines after his passport had been revoked as a result of the declaration of martial law by President Ferdinand Marcos on September 21, 1972.

== Politics and activism ==
Bello received his Ph.D. in sociology from Princeton in 1975 after completing his doctoral dissertation titled "The roots and dynamics of revolution and counterrevolution in Chile." Afterwards, he became part of the anti-Marcos movement, began teaching at the University of California, Berkeley, and became a member of the Communist Party of the Philippines. In 1978 after being arrested multiple times during protests, he was arrested after leading the takeover of the Philippine consulate in San Francisco. Bello was later released following a hunger strike to bring attention to the situation the Philippines was facing. In the early-1980s, Bello also broke into the World Bank headquarters and stole 3,000 pages of confidential documents that he said would show the connection of the IMF and World Bank to Marcos. He later wrote Development Debacle: the World Bank in the Philippines in 1982 surrounding the documents stating that this publication contributed toward the 1986 People Power Revolution in the Philippines, with Bello returning to his native state two years later.

In 1995, Bello co-founded Focus on the Global South, a policy research institute based in Bangkok, Thailand. Bello had also led teach-ins during the 1999 Seattle WTO protests and protested internationally against globalization at the 2001 G8 summit, the WTO Ministerial Conference of 2003, the WTO Ministerial Conference of 2005 and was banned from the 2006 World Bank-IMF Conference in Singapore.

Politically, Bello began to turn away from the Communist Party of the Philippines after he heard that they allegedly killed individuals in the 1980s and 1990s that were accused of being double agents. Bello later joined the Akbayan Citizens' Action Party and became a member of congress in 2007. In March 2015, Bello resigned his position in congress due to conflicts with President Benigno Aquino III that surrounded the Disbursement Acceleration Program and the Mamasapano incident. He ran for senator in 2016 but lost. Bello then convened the second formation of Laban ng Masa in 2017

He currently sits on the board of directors of the International Forum on Globalization and on the board of directors of the leftist think-tank Center for Economic and Policy Research. He is also a member of the regional Greenpeace.

== 2022 national elections ==
The Laban ng Masa coalition launched a campaign to collect 300,000 signatures to urge Bello to run for president in the 2022 elections. In a statement, Laban ng Masa said it wants to "push for an ambitious platform that focuses on the poor, prioritizes the neglected, and fights for the rights of ordinary Filipinos". Bello's group sought talks with Vice President Robredo's backers for three months but were ignored. This caused them to support Leody de Guzman's presidential candidacy, instead.

=== 2022 vice presidential campaign ===
In October 2021, Bello decided to run for the vice-presidency under the Partido Lakas ng Masa, replacing Raquel Castillo who had filed her candidacy as Guzman's running mate in the same party.

== Political positions ==
The US Socialist Worker described Bello as "one of the most articulate and prolific voices on the international left" and that "he has devoted most of his life to fighting imperialism and corporate globalization". Bello was also a supporter of Hugo Chávez and was impressed by his opposition to the United States, stating after Chávez's death that he was "a class act, one impossible to follow. Wherever you are right now, give 'em hell".

== Controversies ==
On August 8, 2022, Bello was arrested by the police in his home in Quezon City through an arrest warrant issued by the Davao City Regional Trial Court Branch 10. He had been indicted in June for cyberlibel based on the Revised Penal Code and the Cybercrime Prevention Act of 2012 (Republic Act 10175); stemming from a complaint filed against him by former Davao City information officer Jefry Tupas. He was detained at the Quezon City Police District headquarters at Camp Karingal until he was released the following day after posting bail.

His arrest was condemned by the European Parliament and the Asean Parliamentarians for Human Rights. The case raised concerns about freedom of speech and reportedly drew protests.

In January 2023, the RTC Branch 10 entered a not guilty plea for Bello as he refused to enter a plea to a charge against him.

== Books ==
Bello has authored and edited a number of nonfiction books. Among them are the following:

- A Siamese Tragedy: Development and Disintegration in Modern Thailand (1999), with co-author Shea Cunningham
- Global Finance: New Thinking on Regulating Speculative Capital Markets (2000), editor, with co-editor Nicola Bullard
- Deglobalization: Ideas for a New World Economy: Global Issues (2005)
- Dilemmas of Domination: The Unmaking of the American Empire (2005)
- The Anti-Development State: The Political Economy of Permanent Crisis in the Philippines (2006), with co-authors Herbert Docena, Marissa de Guzman, and Mary Lou Malig
- The Food Wars (2009)
- Capitalism's Last Stand?: Deglobalization in the Age of Austerity (2013)
- Counterrevolution: The Global Rise of the Far Right (2019)
- Paper Dragons: China and the Next Crash (2019)
- Global Battlefields: My Close Encounters with Dictatorship, Capital, Empire, and Love (2025)

== Electoral history ==
Electoral history of Walden Bello
Year	Office	Party	Votes received				Result
Year	Office	Party	Total	%	P.	Swing	Result
2007	Representative (Party-list)	Akbayan	466,448	2.91%	8th	—N/a	Won
2010	Representative (Party-list)	Akbayan	1,061,947	3.53%	4th	+0.62	Won
2013	Representative (Party-list)	Akbayan	829,149	2.99%	5th	-0.54	Won
2016	Senator of the Philippines	IND	1,091,194	2.43%	36th	—N/a	Lost
2022	Vice President of the Philippines	PLM	100,827	0.19%	7th	—N/a	Lost

== Recognition ==
In 2003, Bello was awarded the Right Livelihood Award, whose website describes him as "one of the leading critics of the current model of economic globalization, combining the roles of intellectual and activist." Bello is also a fellow of the Transnational Institute (based in Amsterdam), and is a columnist for Foreign Policy in Focus. In March 2008 he was named Outstanding Public Scholar for 2008 by the International Studies Association.

Bello was given the Amnesty International Philippines' "Most Distinguished Defender of Human Rights" award in 2023.
