= Food Fighters (action figures) =

Mattel series of action figures

- Complete set of figures
- Product type: Anthropomorphic food figures
- Current owner: Mattel
- Country: United States
- Introduced: 1988
- Discontinued: 1988; 38 years ago

Food Fighters was an action figure line released by Mattel in 1988. Proverbial for the concept of a food fight, the figures were all different types of anthropomorphic food dressed in military gear. Food Fighters consisted of ten figures, three vehicles, and an unproduced playset. The characters were divided into two armies: the protagonist Kitchen Commandos and the antagonist Refrigerator Rejects.

Each figure was made of soft, rotocasted vinyl similar to a squeaky toy with hard plastic limbs. Figures included a small hand weapon and removable backpack, resembling accessories from Hasbro's G.I. Joe line. The tagline on the figure's packaging read, "Combat At Its Kookiest!"

Due to the line's overall poor sales, Food Fighters were commonly sold at small discount store chains like Hills or Ben Franklin.

A lunchbox and thermos set, a jigsaw puzzle, and a single coloring book were some of the few pieces of merchandise to be released from 1988-1989 to support the line.

Collegeville Costumes also released three Food Fighters Halloween costumes in 1989, of the characters Burgerdier General, Private Pizza, and Fat Frenchy. These costumes have been proven to be extremely rare, and were generally unknown to collectors for many years.

== Products ==
=== The Kitchen Commandos ===
The characters wore black boots, green clothing, and carried red weapons.

- Burgerdier General, a cheeseburger
- Major Munch, a doughnut (available with chocolate glaze or cherry glaze)
- Lieutenant Legg, a chicken drumstick
- Sergeant Scoop, an ice cream cone (available as chocolate ice cream or sherbet)
- Private Pizza, a slice of pepperoni and mushroom pizza
- The Combat Carton, an egg carton with a ketchup bottle cannon with tomato-slice and pepperoni projectiles
- The Fry Chopper, a frying pan helicopter with spatula blades
- Fort Fridge, the Kitchen Commandos' refrigerator base (unreleased playset)

=== The Refrigerator Rejects ===
The characters wore brown boots, black clothing, and carried blue weapons.

- Mean Weener, a hot dog
- Chip the Ripper, a chocolate chip cookie (also available as a macadamia cookie)
- Short Stack, a stack of pancakes (available with maple syrup or blueberry syrup)
- Taco Terror, a taco
- Fat Frenchy, a box of french fries
- The BBQ Bomber, a barbecue grill armed with a spatula catapult

== See also ==
- Barnyard Commandos
