= Leody de Guzman =

Filipino unionist and labor rights activist

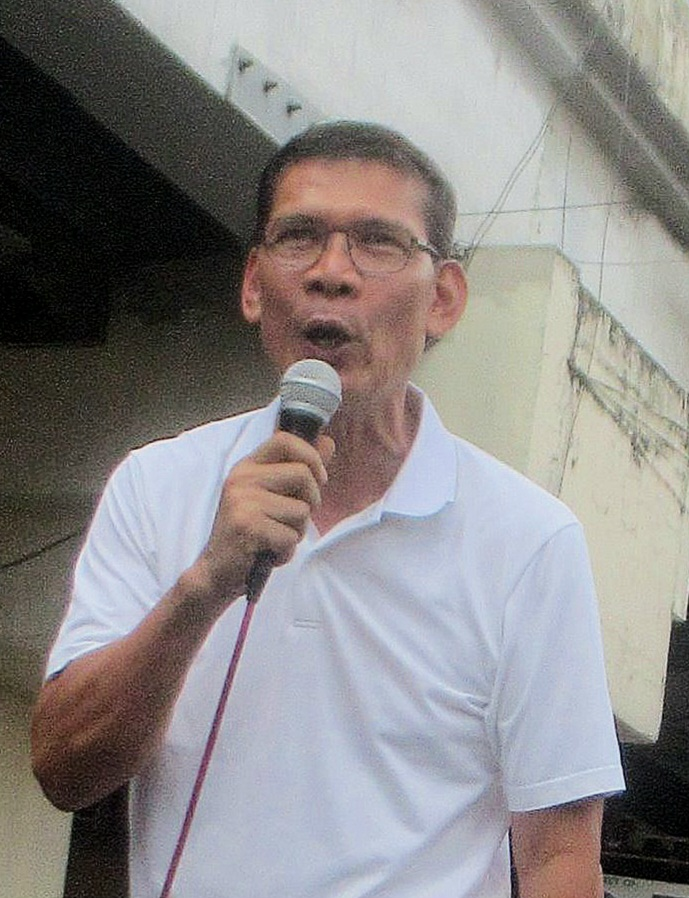
- Leody de Guzman in 2026

Personal details
- Born: Leodegario Quitain de Guzman; July 27, 1959 (age 67) Naujan, Oriental Mindoro, Philippines
- Party: PLM (2018–present)
- Other political affiliations: Sanlakas (until 2018); Partido ng Manggagawa (2001)
- Spouse: Marieza Tolentino
- Children: 3
- Education: PMI Colleges (BS)
- Occupation: Labor leader, activist
- Profession: Customs Broker

Leodegario "Ka Leody" Quitain de Guzman (Tagalog pronunciation: [ˈljodɪ de ɡusˈman]; born July 25, 1959) is a Filipino socialist labor rights activist who ran for president in the 2022 Philippine presidential elections, under the Partido Lakas ng Masa. He is currently the chairperson of the Bukluran ng Manggagawang Pilipino, a socialist federation of militant trade unions. He unsuccessfully sought a seat in the 2019 senatorial elections.

== Early life and career ==
De Guzman was born on July 25, 1959, in Naujan, Oriental Mindoro, to Lorenzo Sason de Guzman and Dolores Atilano Quitain. He finished his Bachelor of Science in Customs Administration degree at the Philippine Maritime Institute, and worked at a leather gloves factory at Aris Philippines Inc. to support his family.

== Activism ==
De Guzman became involved in activism in the aftermath of the assassination of popular anti-Marcos figure Benigno Aquino Jr. Galvanized by the wave of pro-democratic, anti-Marcos opposition protests that ensued, he joined the "Tarlac to Tarmac" march as well as other protests. He led the Aris Philippines branch of the budding Justice for Aquino, Justice for All (JAJA) movement.

De Guzman also became involved in organizing the workers of the factory against the dominant union and would become an organizer for Alyansa ng mga Manggagawa sa Pasig (ALMAPAS), a major labor coalition, from 1984 to 1990.

De Guzman was elected to the regional executive council of the militant labor federation Kilusang Mayo Uno (KMU) in 1991. However, because of increasing differences between KMU NCR and KMU national leadership, De Guzman joined other workers in forming an alternative labor federation, the Bukluran ng Manggagawang Pilipino (BMP) alongside labor leaders such as Romy Castillo, Filemon 'Ka Popoy' Lagman, and Victor Briz. He was elected deputy secretary general of BMP at its formation in 1993, serving until 1996.

In 1996, he was elected as general secretary, serving until 2005 when he became president of BMP until 2018. Since 2018, De Guzman has been chair of BMP. During this time, the BMP was active in organizing during discontent against the presidency of Joseph Estrada. During the impeachment trial of Estrada and subsequent EDSA 2, BMP and Sanlakas called for all elected officials to resign to pave the way for the overhaul of the country's political system. The federation was also active against measures of later governments such as the 2006 state of emergency under the Arroyo administration and the war on drugs of the Duterte administration.

De Guzman is also currently a member of the Board of Trustees of the human rights non-governmental organization PhilRights and Bulig Visayas, another NGO for aiding calamity victims. He is also the current country representative of the International Council of the International Center for Labor Solidarity (ICLS) and vice president of the Asia Regional Organization of Bank, Insurance and Finance Union (AROBIFU).

== Political career ==
=== 2016 House of Representatives bid ===
In the 2016 Philippine House of Representatives party-list election, De Guzman participated in the legislative race as the first nominee of Sanlakas partylist. Sanlakas did not win any seats.

=== 2019 Senate bid ===
In the 2019 Senate election, De Guzman ran as senator under Partido Lakas ng Masa on a platform of ending contractualization as well as the Mining Act of 1995. De Guzman formed the pro-worker Labor Win coalition for the elections with Neri Colmenares of Bayan Muna, Sonny Matula of the Workers’ Party, independent Allan Montaño, and Ernesto Arellano of Katipunan of Kamalayang Kayumanggi. He was also endorsed by the Makabayan bloc for the senatorial elections.

De Guzman placed 38th of 62 candidates with 893,506 (2.17%) of the vote, and did not win a seat.

=== 2022 presidential campaign ===
On September 28, 2021, De Guzman accepted the nomination of the Partido Lakas ng Masa and various progressive organizations to run for president. Later on October 6, De Guzman filed his certificate of candidacy for president, running on a platform of systemic change including labor issues such as raising minimum wage and abolishing contractualization.

Luke Espiritu, Roy Cabonegro, and David D'Angelo filed their candidacies under the party, while De Guzman also identified Teddy Baguilat, Chel Diokno, Bong Labog, Sonny Matula, Leila de Lima, Neri Colmenares, Samira Gutoc and Risa Hontiveros as his Senate bets in an endorsement that rejected "transactional politics".

=== 2025 Senate bid ===
In the 2025 Senate Election, De Guzman, along with Luke Espiritu, would file their candidates under Partido Lakas ng Masa on October 4, 2024, De Guzman would later lose the election, placing 34th and managing to gain 4,136,899 votes.

== Political positions ==
In the 2019 elections, De Guzman positioned himself as a member of the labor opposition within the Labor Win coalition. He proposed to end endo contractualization, abolish the Mining Act of 1995, and suspend the tax system under the TRAIN law. He also supported renewable energy and a review of existing deregulation laws. On social issues, De Guzman opposed the return of the death penalty, pushed for stipends for poor students and the implementation of a Universal Basic Income, and supported the legalization of divorce.

De Guzman also supported the legalization of medical marijuana, the passage of the Bangsamoro Basic Law, divorce bill, abortion, and same-sex marriage in the Philippines. He was against passing constitutional change under the Duterte administration towards federalism, the lowering of criminal age of liability, the extension of Martial law in Mindanao, and the phenomenon of red-tagging against activists and unionists. He also called for an end to political dynasties in the country.

In 2021, De Guzman reiterated his previous political positions, and included other proposals such as the abolition of the NTF-ELCAC and the repeal of the Anti-Terrorism Law of 2020, among other measures that signaled a "violent regime" as part of a 25-point progressive agenda.

He believes that solid positions on the following issues are important if "unification talks" with fellow presidential candidate Vice President Leni Robredo were to be possible:

- amending the rice tariffication law,
- reviewing the military agreements with the U.S. government,
- increasing prices of basic goods,
- automatic debt appropriation, and
- prioritization of labor affairs, including ending contractualization and increasing wages of workers.

More recently, De Guzman serves as Artikulo Onse President, and has supported anti-corruption rallies that "demand transparency and accountability amid the investigations into the alleged anomalous flood control projects."

== Personal life ==
Leody is married to Marieza Tolentino with three children: Prolan, Lea, and Dexter. He currently resides in Cainta, Rizal.

== Electoral history ==
Electoral history of Leody de Guzman
Year	Office	Party	Votes received				Result
Year	Office	Party	Total	%	P.	Swing	Result
2019	Senator of the Philippines	PLM	893,506	1.89%	38th	—N/a	Lost
2025	Senator of the Philippines	PLM	4,136,899	7.21%	34th	+5.32	Lost
2022	President of the Philippines	PLM	93,027	0.17%	8th	—N/a	Lost
