= Zone One Tondo Organization =

- Abbreviation: ZOTO
- Formation: 1970
- Region served: Malabon, Caloocan, Cavite, Bulacan, and Pampanga.
- Affiliations: Bukluran ng Manggagawang Pilipino; Sanlakas; Laban ng Masa

Zone One Tondo Organization (ZOTO), also known as Samahan ng Mamamayan-ZOTO, is a federation of urban poor community groups based in relocation sites and areas for demolition in the Philippines. Established on October 20, 1970, ZOTO is the oldest urban poor organization in the Philippines.

As the name implies, ZOTO started in Tondo, Manila, and eventually spread throughout the country when their Tondo-based members were relocated to different cities and provinces. As of today, ZOTO has established chapters in Malabon, Caloocan, Cavite, Bulacan, and Pampanga.
