= Luke Espiritu =

Filipino lawyer and labor leader

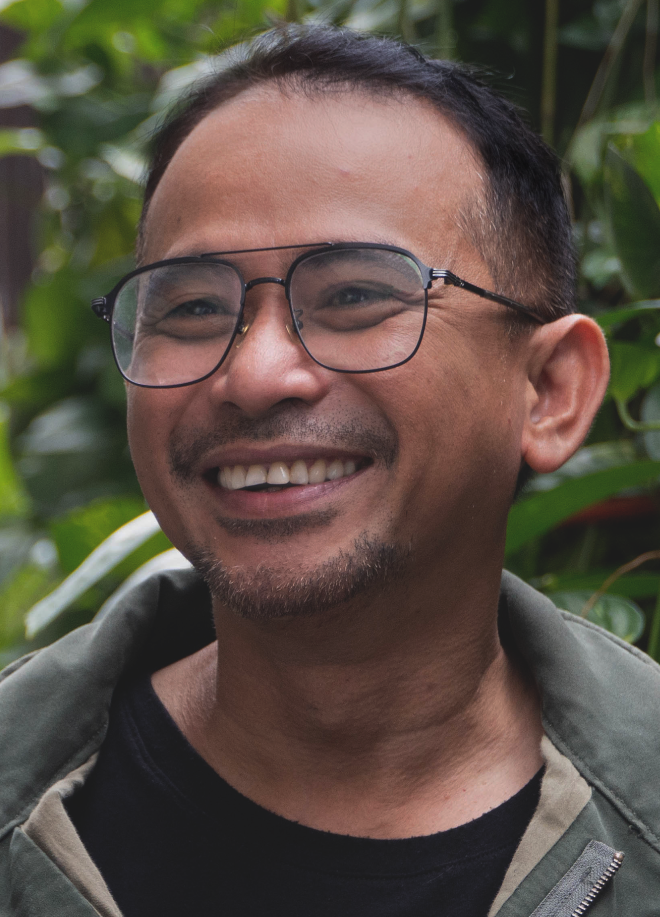
- Espiritu in 2025
- Born: Renecio Santos Espiritu Jr. October 18, 1974 (age 52); Bacolod, Negros Occidental, Philippines
- Education: Ateneo de Manila High School; La Salle Greenhills; La Salle Bacolod
- Alma mater: Ateneo de Manila University (AB, JD)
- Occupations: Labor leader, Lawyer
- Organization(s): Bukluran ng Manggagawang Pilipino (President); Freedom from Debt Coalition (Board of Trustees Member)
- Political party: PLM (from 2021)
- Spouse: Aimee Ruth U. Espiritu
- Children: 4

Renecio "Luke" Santos Espiritu Jr. (born October 18, 1974) is a Filipino labor leader, lawyer, and political figure. He serves as the president of Bukluran ng Manggagawang Pilipino and is a board of trustees member of the Freedom from Debt Coalition. In 2024, he formalized his bid for the Philippine Senate in the 2025 elections.

== Early life and education ==
Espiritu was born in Bacolod, Negros Occidental. He attended La Salle Bacolod from 1981 to 1986, followed by La Salle Greenhills where he completed his grade school education in 1988. He then attended Ateneo de Manila High School, graduating in 1992. He continued his education at Ateneo de Manila University, where he earned his Bachelor of Arts degree in Communication Arts degree and later his Doctor of Jurisprudence.

== Career and advocacy ==
As a labor leader, Espiritu has been vocal about workers' rights and various social issues. He serves as the president of Bukluran ng Manggagawang Pilipino, a labor organization, and holds a position on the board of trustees of the Freedom from Debt Coalition. He is also co-convener of the anti-corruption group Artikulo Onse.

=== Political stance and advocacy ===
Espiritu has taken clear positions on various social and economic issues:

- Economic Policy: He advocates for government subsidies to support MSMEs (Micro, Small and Medium Enterprises) in implementing wage increases, arguing that wage hikes are necessary for workers while acknowledging the need to support smaller businesses.
- Social Issues: He has publicly supported:
  - Legalization of divorce
  - Same-sex marriage
  - Reproductive rights including access to abortion

=== Notable public engagements ===
In March 2022, Espiritu gained public attention during a senatorial debate where he engaged in notable exchanges with Harry Roque and Larry Gadon regarding issues such as the Marcos family's ill-gotten wealth and Martial Law.

In January 2023, he made headlines for his response to social media influencer Donnalyn Bartolome, emphasizing the challenging conditions faced by Filipino workers.

== Political career ==
On October 6, 2021, Espiritu filed his certificate of candidacy for the 2022 Philippine Senate elections under Partido Lakas ng Masa. He later lost the election and placed 34th, managing to gain 3,470,550 votes.

On October 4, 2024, Espiritu, along with fellow labor leader Leody de Guzman, formally filed his certificate of on candidacy once again for the 2025 Philippine Senate elections. His campaign focused on advocacy for labor rights and social reforms. Espiritu would go on to lose the election again and placed 29th and managed to gain 6,481,413 votes.

== Personal life ==
Espiritu is married to Aimee Ruth U. Espiritu, and together they have four children.

== Electoral history ==
Electoral history of Luke Espiritu
Year	Office	Party	Votes received				Result
Year	Office	Party	Total	%	P.	Swing	Result
2022	Senator of the Philippines	PLM	3,470,550	6.25%	34th	—N/a	Lost
2025	Senator of the Philippines	PLM	6,481,413	11.30%	29th	+5.05	Lost
