= Sanlakas =

Political party in the Philippines

- Chairman: Fr. Max Abalos
- Founded: October 29, 1993 (as Sandigan ng Demokrasya at Kalayaan ng Sambayanan)
- Split from: Bayan
- Headquarters: Quezon City
- Ideology: Progressivism; Socialism
- Political position: Left-wing
- National affiliation: Laban ng Masa
- Colors: Blue

Sanlakas (transl. One Strength) is a multisectoral organization and former party-list in the Philippines. It is a progressive coalition of different marginalized sectors in the Philippines founded on October 29, 1993.

Founded as a splinter from the multisectoral group Bayan, Sanlakas was one of the progressive partylists that won a seat in the House of Representatives in 1998, the first party-list elections in the Philippines. Sanlakas won a seat in the lower house for the second time in 2001. It was notable for pushing the slogan Resign All! at the height of EDSA II, which was different from the calls of other progressive organizations at that time.

Some of the affiliates of Sanlakas are Bukluran ng Manggagawang Pilipino (BMP), Kongreso ng Pagkakaisa ng Maralita ng Lungsod (KPML), Aniban ng Manggagawa sa Agrikultura (AMA), Zone One Tondo Organization (ZOTO), Partido Lakas ng Masa, Samahan ng Progresibong Kabataan (SPARK), Oriang, and Philippine Movement for Climate Justice (PMCJ).

== Track record ==
Known as an activist political party, Sanlakas constantly figures in protest actions against certain policies of the government like the Electric Power Industry Reform Act, the Cybercrime Prevention Act, the Mining Act of 1995, among others.

Sanlakas was also a petitioner in several cases in the Supreme Court of the Philippines against Philippine laws and policies they deem detrimental to the welfare of the Filipino people like the Oil Deregulation Law, and the declaration of a State of Rebellion during the time of President Gloria Macapagal Arroyo.

Among the victims of the serial killings of political activists in the Philippines, during the Arroyo administration, are Sanlakas members like trade unionist Andrew Inoza, peasant leader Frank Labial, and revolutionary socialist Filemon Lagman. Lagman, one of the founders of Sanlakas, is considered as the first prominent victim of political assassination under the presidency of Gloria Arroyo.

== Representatives to Congress ==
- 11th Congress (1998–2001) - Rene Magtubo
- 12th Congress (2001–2004) - Jose Virgilio "JV" Bautista

== Electoral performance ==
Election	Votes	%	Seats
1998	194,617*	2.13%	1
2001	151,017	2.31%	1
2004	189,517	1.49%	0
2007	97,375	0.61%	0
2010	Delisted		
2013	85,939	0.31%	0
2016	87,351	0.27%	0

*Veterans Federation Party vs. COMELEC

== See also ==
- Partido Lakas ng Masa
- Partido ng Manggagawa
