= Etta Rosales =

Filipina activist, teacher and politician

Loretta Ann P. Rosales
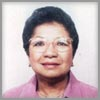
- Official portrait, 2004

Chairperson of the Commission on Human Rights of the Philippines
- In office September 1, 2010 – May 5, 2015
- Preceded by: Leila de Lima
- Succeeded by: Chito Gascon

Member of the Philippine House of Representatives for Akbayan Partylist
- In office June 30, 1998 – June 30, 2007 Serving with Risa Hontiveros (2004–2007) and Dr. Mario J. Aguja (2001–2007)
- Preceded by: newly created
- Succeeded by: Risa Hontiveros; Walden Bello

Personal details
- Born: August 17, 1939 (age 87) Manila, Philippine Commonwealth
- Party: Akbayan (1998–present)
- Other political affiliations: ACT Teachers (1982–1998); Partido ng Bayan (1987-1992)
- Occupation: Activist
- Profession: Teacher
- Website: Website

Loretta Ann Pargas Rosales (born August 17, 1939) is a Filipina activist, teacher and politician who has served three terms as the party-list representative of the Akbayan Citizens' Action Party to the Philippines' House of Representatives from the 11th-13th Congress (1998-2007). She was the Chairperson of the Commission on Human Rights of the Republic of the Philippines from 2010 to 2015.

== Career ==
She is a well-known defender of human rights and was instrumental in instituting a class action suit in the Hawaii District Court which resulted in the only judgment holding the former dictator Ferdinand E. Marcos liable for gross human rights violations committed during his incumbency, which judgment was partially executed in 2011. She herself is a victim of human rights violations by the Marcos regime.

As an activist, she co-founded the left-leaning organization for the education sector called the Alliance of Concerned Teachers (ACT) in 1982. She was also the chairperson of Partido ng Bayan. In 1985, she became a member of the newly-established Bagong Alyansang Makabayan (Bayan), where she headed the Popular Struggles and People's Welfare Commission. She joined Akbayan in 1998, formed the Akbayan Citizens' Action Party, better known as Akbayan. She was elected as a congresswoman for that party list from 1998 to 2007.

After serving in Congress for three terms, she served as Co-Chairperson of the Philippine Coalition for the International Criminal Court and founded Building Bridges for Peace, a multi-sectoral initiative to secure land rights and security for agrarian reform and indigenous communities through dialogue.

In 2010, she was the possible choice of President Benigno S. Aquino III to head the country's Commission on Human Rights as a replacement to Leila de Lima, who became the Justice Secretary of the country. Many left-wing organizations, such as Karapatan and the Bagong Alyansang Makabayan (Bayan) (a group she was formerly aligned with), protested her appointment, stating that she was unfit for the position.

Rosales is a known critic of the regime of Gloria Macapagal Arroyo and has often led her party list in protests in opposition to it. Risa Hontiveros, a colleague in Akbayan, welcomed her appointment. She was appointed Commission on Human Rights Chairperson on September 1, 2010. As CHR Chairperson, she also served as Chairperson of the Southeast Asia National Human Rights Institutions Forum, the regional network of national human rights institutions in ASEAN.

In November 2017, the Progressive Alliance cited Rosales for her contribution to human rights in the Philippines and for political courage. She was the first recipient of the award.

In 2018, Rosales was recognized by the Human Rights Violations Victims' Memorial Commission as a human rights violations victim of the Martial Law Era.

== Electoral history ==
Electoral history of Etta Rosales
Year	Office	Party	Votes received				Result
Year	Office	Party	Total	%	P.	Swing	Result
1998	Representative (Party-list)	Akbayan	232,376	2.54%	9th	—N/a	Won
2001	Representative (Party-list)	Akbayan	377,852	5.79%	3rd	+3.25	Won
2004	Representative (Party-list)	Akbayan	852,473	6.70%	3rd	+0.91	Won
