= Kongreso ng Pagkakaisa ng Maralita ng Lungsod =

Coalition of urban poor community groups in the Philippines

Kongreso ng Pagkakaisa ng Maralita ng Lungsod is a coalition of urban poor community groups in the Philippines. It was established on December 18, 1986, as the largest umbrella organization of community-based organizations in Metro Manila. Presently, KPML has already established presence in some provinces of Central Luzon and Southern Tagalog as well as the islands of Panay, Guimaras, Negros, and Cebu in the Visayas.

In April 1986, KPML had an audience with President Corazon Aquino and asked for a moratorium on demolition activities, and for the establishment of a government unit that would allow avenues for the poor for consultation and participation on things that concern them. This led to the formation of the Presidential Arm on Urban Poor Affairs (PAUPA), which was later renamed as the Presidential Commission for the Urban Poor (PCUP).
