= Filemon Lagman =

Filipino trade unionist and revolutionary (1953–2001)

"Ka Popoy" Lagman

Personal details
- Born: Filemon Castelar Lagman; March 17, 1953 Bicol, Philippines
- Died: February 6, 2001 (aged 47) Quezon City, Philippines
- Cause of death: Assassination by gunshot
- Resting place: Loyola Memorial Park Marikina, Philippines
- Party: Partido ng Manggagawang Pilipino (1999–2001); Sanlakas (1993–2001); Communist Party of the Philippines (until 1991)
- Relations: Edcel Lagman (brother)
- Occupation: Marxist theoretician, labor leader
- Known for: Founder of Bukluran ng Manggagawang Pilipino (BMP), Kapatiran ng mga Pangulo ng Unyon sa Pilipinas (KPUP)

Filemon Castelar Lagman (March 17, 1953 – February 6, 2001), also known by the aliases Ka Popoy and Carlos Forte, was a Filipino revolutionary socialist and labor leader who supported Marxism-Leninism. He split with the Communist Party of the Philippines in 1991 due to ideological disagreements to form the Bukluran ng Manggagawang Pilipino (BMP) and Sanlakas. He was assassinated in 2001 at the University of the Philippines Diliman in Quezon City while working for the launch of the electoral party Partido ng Manggagawa.

== Personal life ==
Filemon Castelar Lagman was born to Pedro Eduardo Diaz Lagman Jr., a teacher and prosecutor, and Cecilia Castelar, who was also a teacher. Filemon had five other siblings. He was a track and field athlete of Caloocan High School.

Filemon's first wife was Dodi Garduce, while his second wife was Bobbie Jopson (sister of martial law dissident Edgar Jopson). His brother was Albay congressman Edcel Lagman.

== Activism ==
Lagman's political views started to manifest during his early high school days when he frequently argued with teachers who did not share his ideas. During the First Quarter Storm, he was a member of Samahang Demokratiko ng Kabataan (Democratic Association of the Youth) in the 1970s. After only a year at the University of the Philippines, he decided to go underground and do full-time organizing work in the factories and urban poor communities in the northern sector of Metro Manila. When martial law was declared on September 23, 1972, Lagman established the first network of the underground revolutionary movement in Navotas. He organized, along with his comrades, the labor unions in factories and other work sites, launched mass mobilizations, developed a political mass base among workers and recruited more party members for the Communist Party of the Philippines (CPP).

=== CPP Manila-Rizal party secretary; 1978 Batasang Pambansa election ===
Ka Popoy was elected secretary of the Manila-Rizal Regional Party Committee of the CPP in the mid-1970s and spearheaded the broad formation which challenged the Marcos dictatorship in the 1978 Batasang Pambansa election. The Central Committee of the CPP admonished Ka Popoy and the whole regional committee for advocating participation in the elections because it ran counter to the party's election boycott and preference for rural armed struggle against the dictatorship. Ka Popoy was thus confined to a safe house while the Central Committee prepared for an inquiry into the issue, with Edgar Jopson succeeding him as Manila-Rizal's acting party secretary in July 1978. Ka Popoy was only able to return at the helm of the Manila-Rizal Regional Party Committee after the People Power Revolution in 1986. Despite his differences with the central leadership, Ka Popoy continued to strengthen revolutionary work in the capital.

At the height of the CPP split, Lagman wrote the biggest critique on CPP founding chair Jose Maria Sison's book Philippine Society and Revolution—the Counter-theses composed of Counter-Thesis 1 (PSR: A Semi-feudal Alibi for Protracted War, PPDR: Class Line vs. Mass Line and PPW: A New-Type Revolution of the Wrong Type) and Counter-Thesis 2 (On the Reorientation of the Party Work, the Reorganization of the Party Machinery, and Regarding the Tactical Slogan of the Current Situation). Lagman argued in his critique that Philippine society was capitalist in a backward and underdeveloped way, rather than being semi-feudal and semi-colonial. Lagman thus posited that a workers-led revolution must be waged to dismantle capitalism, instead of a protracted people's war from the countryside.

=== Bukluran ng Manggagawang Pilipino; Sanlakas ===
In 1991, he split with the CPP to form the aboveground union Bukluran ng Manggagawang Pilipino (BMP) and the multi-sectoral group Sanlakas. He also led the formation of the Partido ng Manggagawang Pilipino (Filipino Workers' Party), an underground revolutionary socialist party, which, after his death, merged with the Sosyalistang Partido ng Paggawa (Socialist Party of Labor) and the Partido para sa Proletaryong Demokrasya (Party for Proletarian Democracy).

== Death ==
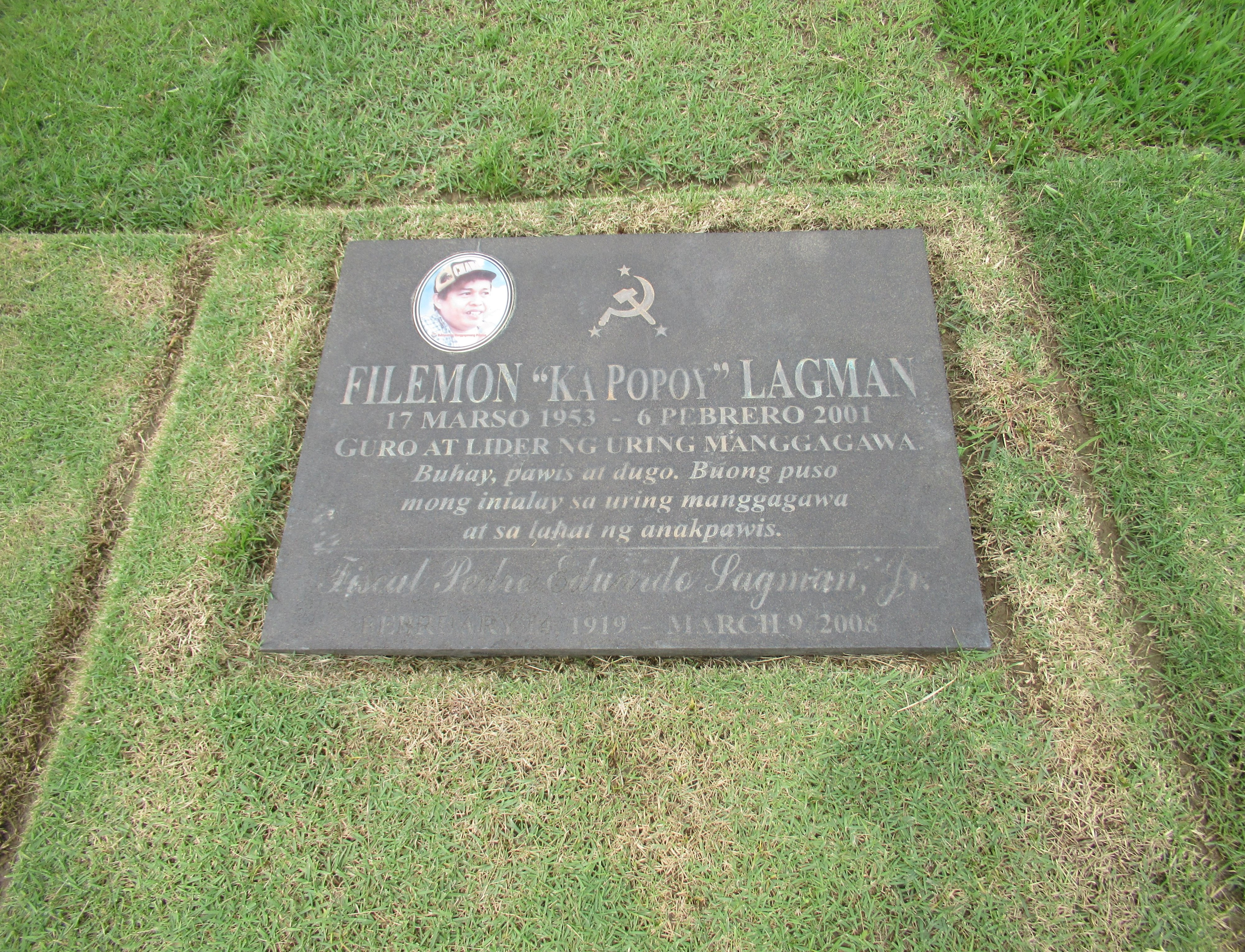
Lagman (Loyola Memorial Park)

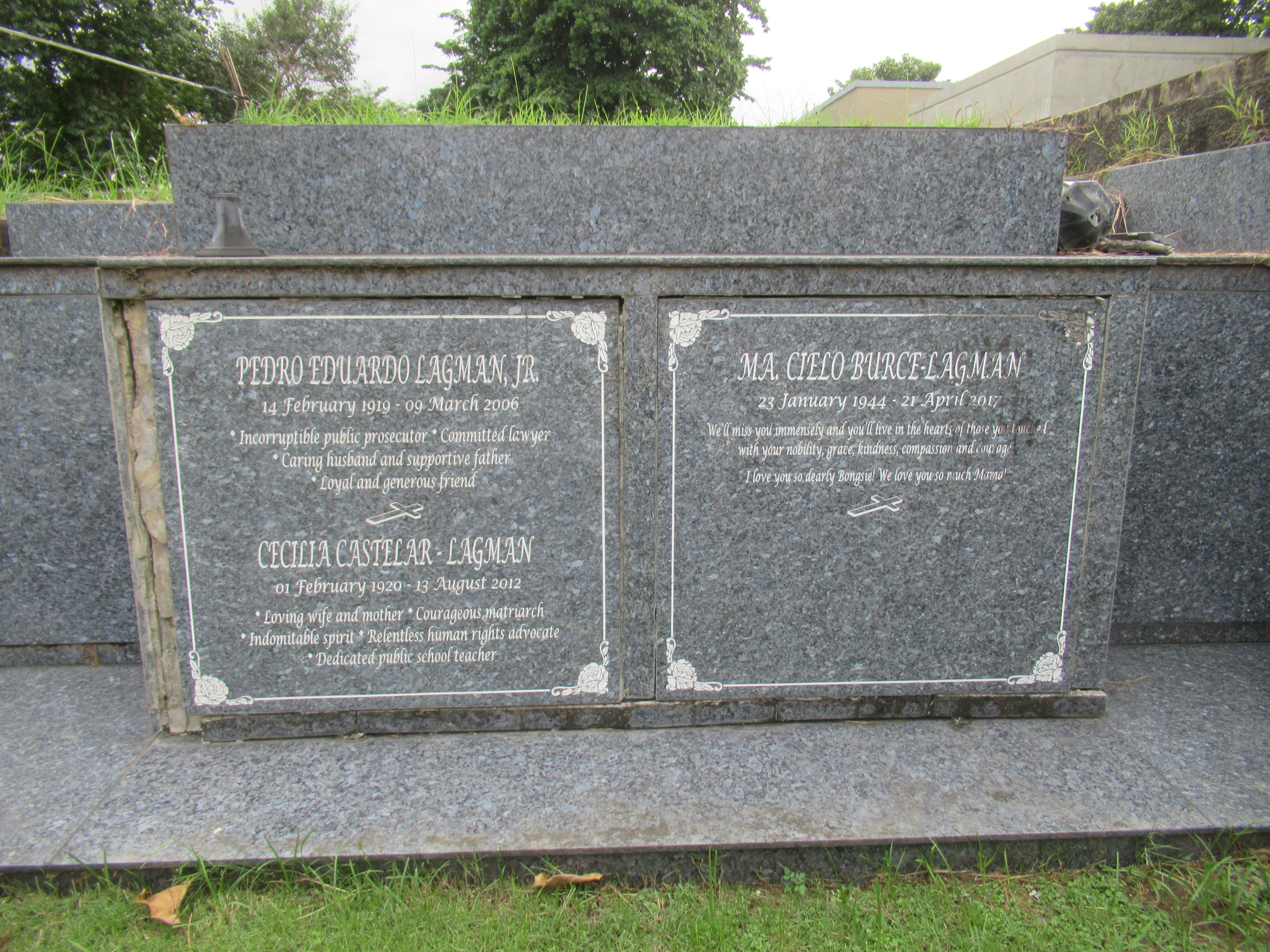
Lagman's family (Pedro Eduardo Lagman, Jr., Cecilia Castellar-Lagman-Maria Cielo Burce-Lagman)

Lagman was ambushed and fatally shot by two unidentified gunmen on the afternoon of February 6, 2001, at the east-side steps of the University of the Philippines-Diliman's Bahay ng Alumni in Diliman, Quezon City. At the time of his death, Ka Popoy was working on the launch of the Partido ng Manggagawa, the workers' political party that would participate in the 2001 mid-term elections.

=== Aftermath ===
His assassination is speculated to have been carried out by a military faction loyal to deposed president Joseph Estrada which aimed to destabilize the newly formed government of Gloria Macapagal-Arroyo. Further investigation by the police revealed that the assassins and the culprits may have come from the Revolutionary Proletarian Army-Alex Boncayao Brigade, another "rejectionist" faction of the CPP. The perpetrators were never caught. In July 2007, the Quezon City Prosecutor's Office decided to drop the case on eight suspected communist assassins since the witnesses were unable to attend the preliminary investigations.
