= Bukluran ng Manggagawang Pilipino =

Philippine socialist and trade union organisation

- Solidarity of Filipino Workers
- Bukluran ng Manggagawang Pilipino
- Abbreviation: BMP
- Founded: September 2, 1993; 33 years ago
- Founder: Filemon Lagman
- Headquarters: Quezon City, Philippines
- Location: Philippines
- Chairman: Domingo Mole
- President: Luke Espiritu
- Vice Presidents: See list: Lito Rastica; Edna Paz Porte; Dominic Dilao
- Secretary-General: Rodel Andes
- Website: https://bukluranngmanggagawangpilipino.blogspot.com/

The Bukluran ng Manggagawang Pilipino or Solidarity of Filipino Workers (BMP) is a socialist labor center of militant workers and trade unions in the Philippines.

Established on 2 September 1993 as the Bukluran ng Manggagawa para sa Pagbabago (Solidarity of Workers for Change), it was formed as a result of the great left divide in the Philippines, which also affected the Kilusang Mayo Uno (KMU), about 70 percent of KMU-NCR's membership left the organization to form BMP as a counterpose to its sectarian politics that failed to unite Filipino workers and advance the Philippine labor movement. It is currently an affiliate of PAGGAWA, a national labor coalition.

== Campaigns ==
In 1993, BMP initiated the formation of Labor Alliance for Wage Increase (LAWIN), a broad alliance of labor organizations campaigning for a P35 across-the-board increase in the minimum wage. The government yielded and gave workers a P25 wage increase.

Together with Sanlakas, BMP was instrumental in creating the Kilusang Roll Back (Roll Back Movement or KRB), which campaigned for the rollback of fuel prices in the Philippines. Then Philippine President Fidel Ramos was forced to lower the prices of oil by an average of one peso per liter.

In 1995, together with at least 80,000 people, BMP campaigned against the creation of the Expanded Value Added Tax (E-VAT) during President Ramos' State of the Nation Address (SONA).

With the help of Sanlakas and other labor organizations, BMP sponsored the biggest anti-Asia Pacific Economic Cooperation (APEC) Conference and biggest anti-APEC protest caravan from Manila to Subic during the 1996 APEC Summit at Subic Bay in Central Luzon, Philippines.

In 1997, BMP, with the help of the Federation of Free Workers, organized a unified labor support to the struggle of the dismissed workers of the German-owned Telefunken Microelectronics (TEMIC). For 11 days, they invaded the offices of the Secretary of Labor and demanded implementation of their reinstatement orders.

In 1998, BMP participated in the party-list elections through the Sanlakas party-list. BMP leader Rene Magtubo, then president of the Fortune Tobacco Labor Union, occupied the seat for Sanlakas.

The period 1999 to 2001, BMP participated in the growing protest of discontent under the administration of President Joseph Estrada. But instead of calling for the ouster of Estrada, BMP joined Sanlakas in their demand for all elected officials to resign and pave the way for the overhaul of the country's political system.

During the presidency of Gloria Macapagal Arroyo, BMP consistently opposed government plans, laws, and policies that they deem detrimental to Filipino workers such as Arroyo's support to United States's all-out-war against Iraq, the proposed National ID System, among others.
