= Diokno =

Diokno Diocno
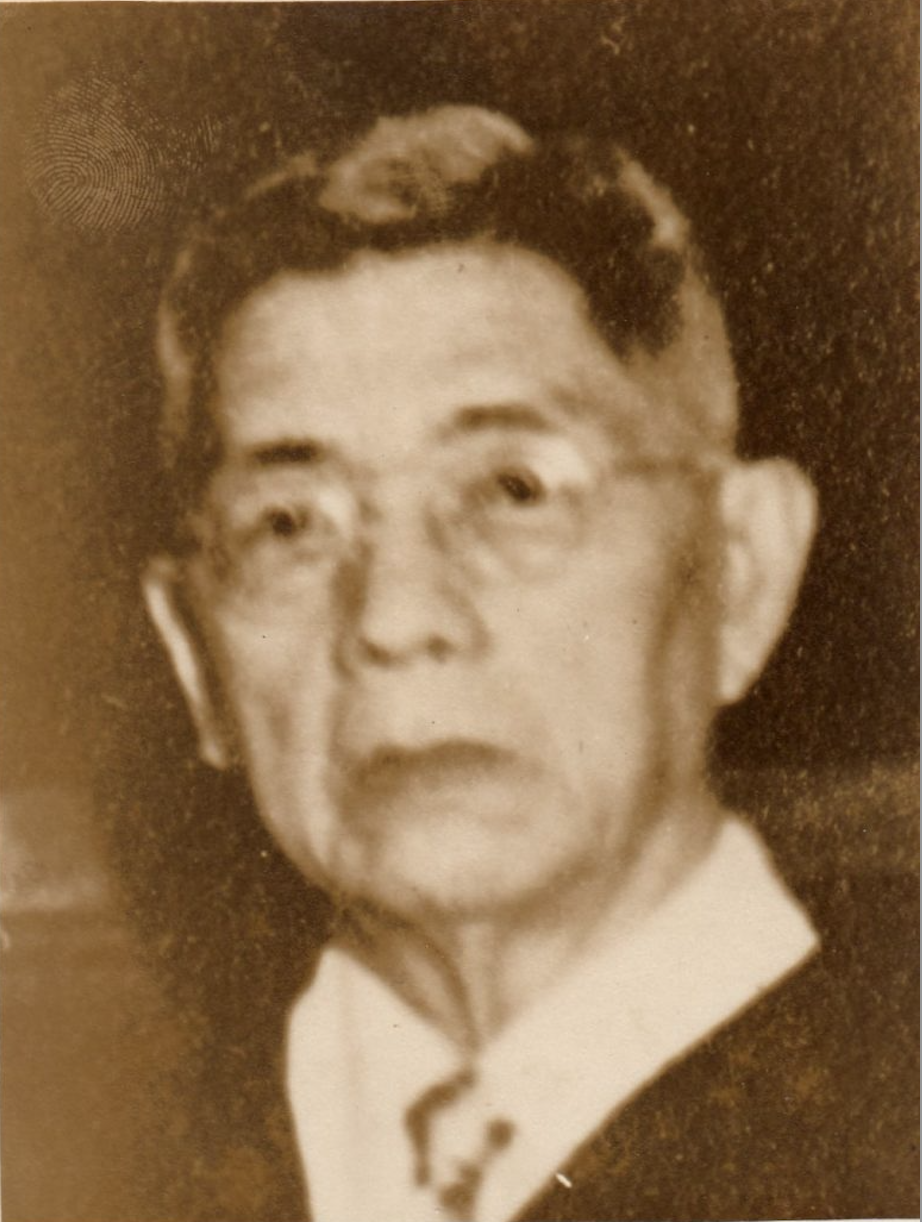
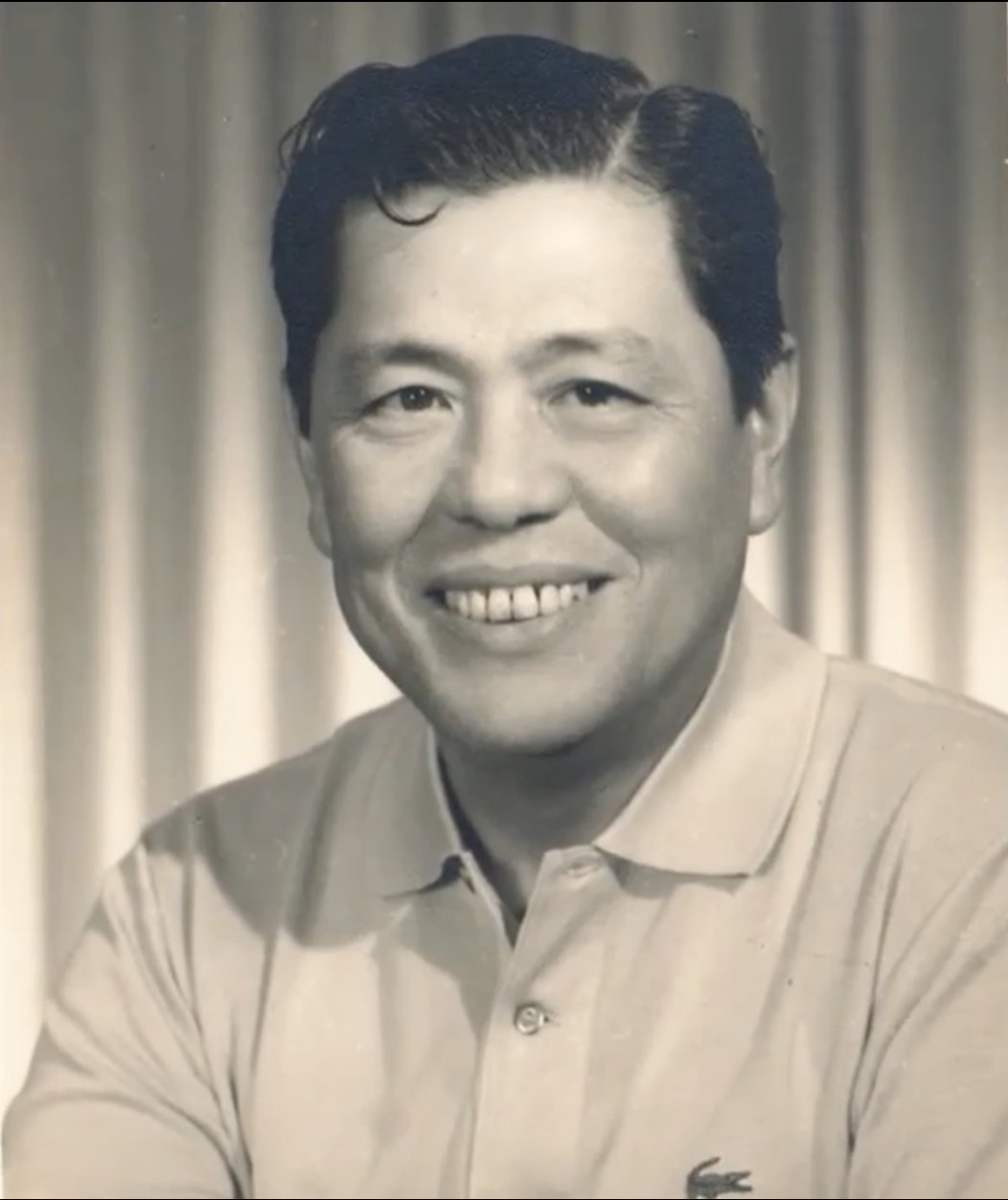
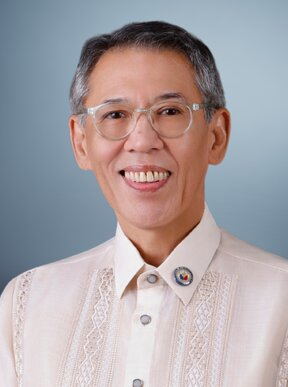
- Ramón Diokno Jose W. Diokno Chel Diokno
- Current region: Batangas and Metro Manila, Philippines
- Origin: Taal, Batangas, Captaincy General of the Philippines
- Members: see names below

Diokno (Tagalog: [ˈdʒɔknɔ]) is a Filipino surname that originated from Taal, Batangas. It was changed to a more Filipino surname from the original Hispanized surname, Diocno. Ángel Diokno (born c. 1830) is the oldest known patriarch of the immediate family of Gen. Ananías Diokno (son of Ángel). Although the Diokno family members are primarily prevalent in the Philippines, there are significant numbers of people with this surname in the United States, Saudi Arabia, and other countries. Through marriages the Diokno clan is also interrelated with multiple historical figures, such as public servants Justice Francis Garchitorena, Corazon Aquino (sixth cousin twice removed of Jose W. Diokno through the Sumulong clan), and Governor-General Félix Berenguer de Marquina y Fitzgerald, who is the namesake of Marikina.

== Family of Ananías Diokno ==
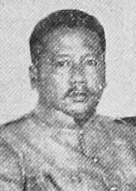
Ananías Diokno

Because of the Irish ancestry of Berenguer de Marquina coming from the noble Fitzgerald clan, he descends from some Norman French or English, and European nobles such as Saint Begga of Belgium by forty degrees. St. Begga is the great-great grandmother of King Charlemagne and daughter-in-law to St. Arnulf of Metz, France. The great-great grandson of Berenguer de Marquina is Ananías Diokno, who also descends from William Boleyn, who is the grandfather of Elizabeth I of England. Berenguer de Marquina had an illegitimate Chinese mestiza daughter from Cagsawa, Albay who married a Spanish-Mexican public servant surnamed Sauza, whose daughter settled in Taal, Batangas, marrying a member of the Tagalog Noblejas clan. Their daughter María Andrea Noblejas y Sauza (born c. 1834), who descended from Berenguer de Marquina, became part of the Diokno family by marrying Ángel Diokno (born c. 1830). Because of the Fitzgerald clan, the line at least starting Ananías Diokno y Noblejas can trace its roots to nobles, public servants, soldiers, and saints from the first century A.D.

Notable immediate family members of the main branch of the Ananías Diokno clan include:

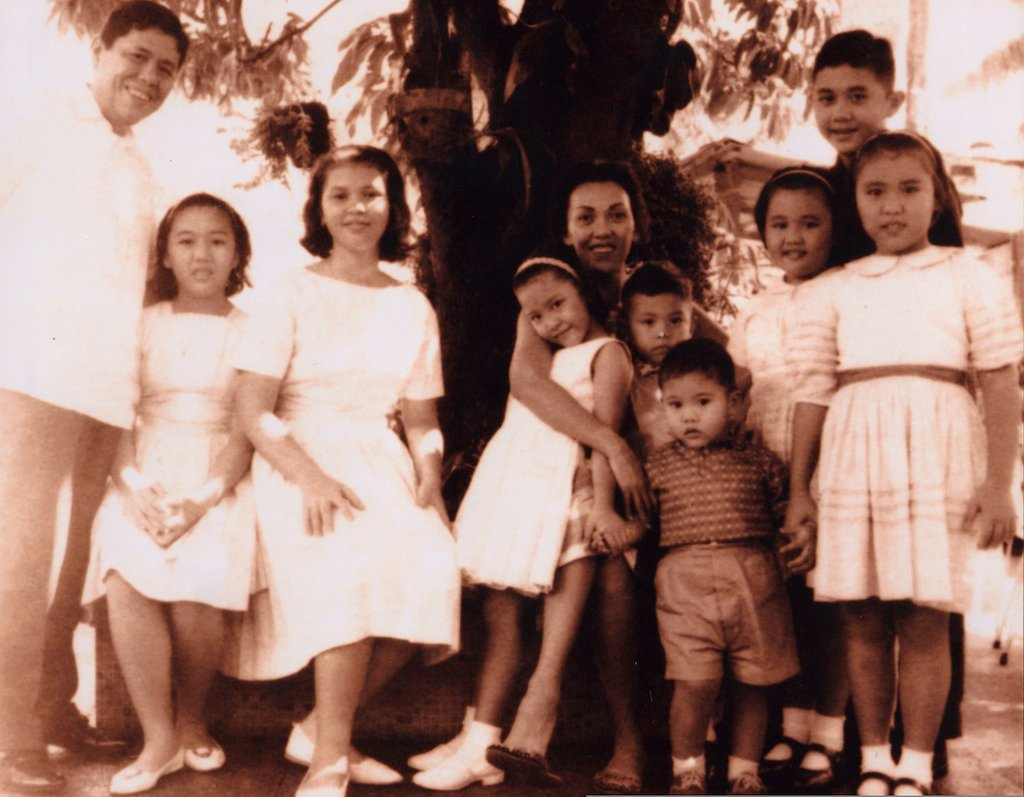
Family of Sen. Jose W. Diokno and Carmen Diokno

- Ananías Diokno, (1860-1922), son of Ángel Diokno and María Andrea Noblejas, Filipino general, and early patriarch of the family whose home may be found in Taal Heritage Town
- Felisa Punzalan Diokno, sister of Ananías and daughter of Ángel Diokno, secretary of the cabinet of President Emilio Aguinaldo during the years of the Philippine Revolution, lived at a now-preserved ancestral home in Taal Heritage Town
- Ramón Diokno, (1886-1954), son of Ananías, Filipino Supreme Court justice and senator
- Jose W. Diokno, (1922-1987), third son and sixth child of Ramón Diokno and Leonor Garcia Wright, Filipino nationalist and senator
- Carmen Diokno, (1923-2011) wife of Jose W. Diokno and daughter-in-law of Ramón Diokno, Filipino activist and matriarch of the Diokno family
- Carmen Leonor "Mench" Diokno-Escay, (born February 12, 1950), eldest child of Jose, Filipino NGO worker and UP Diliman valedictorian
- Maris Diokno, (born August 1954), fourth child and third daughter of Jose, Filipino national historian
- Maria Teresa Tadea "Maitet" Diokno-Pascual, fifth child and fourth daughter of Jose, national economist from the London School of Economics and Finance Officer of Sa Uma
- Ma. Soccoro Tadea Cookie Diokno, sixth child and fifth daughter of Jose, Secretary-General of the Free Legal Assistance Group
- Jose Manuel Tadeo I. Chel Diokno, (born 1961), eighth child and third son of Jose, Filipino law school dean and congressman
- Jose Lorenzo "Pepe" Diokno III (born 1987), eldest child of Chel, Filipino award-winning director and producer

== Non-Immediate relatives outside the main branch of Ananías Diokno ==
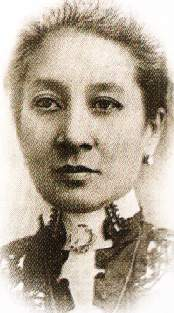
Marcela Agoncillo

- Marcela Mariño de Agoncillo, wife of Felipe Agoncillo and daughter of Francisco Diokno Mariño, she is called "The Mother of the Philippine Flag," who sewed the original flag of the Philippines, first unfurled at the declaration of Philippine Independence on June 12, 1898, while her Taal ancestral home owned by Francisco Mariño has been converted into a museum in Agoncillo's name; they share another common ancestor (a Galician) named Ricardo Alfonso Sauza y Holguín, making Agoncillo the third cousin once removed of Ananías Diokno, or third cousin four times removed of Chel Diokno; Chel Diokno and Agoncillo share this relation while simultaneously being linked as cousins in a different degree through another common ancestor surnamed Diokno, and are also related through a common ancestor from Batangas surnamed Marasigan
- Ananias Cornejo Diokno, (born August 1942), grandnephew of Ananías Diokno and second cousin of Jose W. Diokno, Filipino urologist and professor at US educational institutions, including the University of Central Florida College of Medicine and Oakland University William Beaumont School of Medicine, which named a road and library in his honor
- Fr. Jose Diokno, (1819), A Filipino secular priest, appointed from 1819 to 1859 as a parish priest; he donated the painting of the Fifteen Mysteries of the Holy Rosary (Our Lady of Loreto), recorded in the book of inventory of the church properties on February 10, 1855
- Benjamin Diokno, (born 1948), second cousin (descended from Ángel Diokno) of Jose W. Diokno, Filipino economist and politician of Corazon Aquino, Joseph Estrada, Rodrigo Duterte, and Bongbong Marcos
- Leopoldo Diokno, Filipino sergeant, honored for his valiance during the 2000s armed conflicts in Mindanao, and recipient of the Medal of Valor and Distinguished Conduct Star, among other medals
- Roberto C Diokno, (born 1931), Filipino, Batangas's 1st district Congressman for the House of Representatives of the Philippines; Nacionalista (1970-1973), Makati Regional Trial Court Judge Branch 62 (1989-2001) in the landmark case Allado v. Diokno, convicted Cong. Romeo Jalosjos
- Antonio Heredia Noblejas, Taaleño lawyer, Commissioner of the Land Registration Authority, Author of "Land Titles and Deeds", and third cousin of Sen. Jose W. Diokno
