= Pepe Diokno =

Pepe Diokno may refer to:

- José W. Diokno (1922–1987), Filipino nationalist human rights lawyer and legislator
- Pepe Diokno (director) (born 1987), Filipino motion picture director, producer and screenwriter
