= Maris Diokno =

Filipino historian and academic (born 1954)

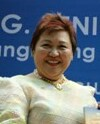

10th Chairperson of the National Historical Commission of the Philippines
- In office April 15, 2011 – November 29, 2016
- President: Benigno Aquino III; Rodrigo Duterte
- Preceded by: Ambeth Ocampo
- Succeeded by: Rene Escalante

Personal details
- Born: Maria Serena Encarnacion Icasiano Diokno; August 16, 1954 (age 72) Manila, Philippines
- Education: SOAS University of London; University of the Philippines Diliman

Maria Serena Encarnacion "Maris" Icasiano Diokno (born August 16, 1954) is a Filipino historian, academic, and former government official best known for having served as chair of the National Historical Commission of the Philippines (NHCP) and as a Vice-President for Academic Affairs at the University of the Philippines (UP) system.

== Early life and education ==
Diokno was born in Manila on August 16, 1954. She was the fourth of ten children of Filipino nationalist figure and legislator Jose W. Diokno and Carmen Icasiano. Her father is considered to be the father of human rights. She is also the older sister of human rights advocate Chel Diokno and the aunt of Chel's son, the independent filmmaker Pepe Diokno. Like the rest of the daughters of the Diokno clan, she was educated at St. Scholastica's College, Manila. Diokno graduated from UP Diliman and earned a PhD in African and Oriental studies at the University of London in 1983.

== Career ==
She aided her father at the Commission on Human Rights (CHR), where her father was the founder and first chairman, until the Mendiola Massacre caused Maris to resign for the first time in 1987. She later returned for her second government stint to join the NHCP.

Diokno succeeded fellow historian Ambeth Ocampo as chairperson of the NHCP on April 7, 2011. She resigned from her position on November 29, 2016, in response to the burial of former dictator Ferdinand Marcos at the Libingan ng mga Bayani.

== Ancestry ==
She is the grandchild of Gen. Ananías Diokno, who was leader of the Visayan Forces in the Philippine–American War. Ananías is the father of Supreme Court Justice and senator Ramón Diokno. Ananías is also the great-great-grandson of the namesake of Marikina, Gen. Felix Berenguer de Marquina y Fitzgerald. Because of the noble Irish roots of Berenguer de Marquina, Maris is descended from Norman French or English as well as European nobles such as the Belgian Saint Begga, who is her ancestor by forty seven degrees. Diokno is also a descendant of St. Begga's father-in-law St. Arnulf of Metz, France. St. Begga is the great-great-grandmother of King Charlemagne. Diokno is also a descendant of William Boleyn, who is grandfather to Elizabeth I of England, and Diokno could trace her roots through the Fitzgerald clan all the way back to the first century A.D.

== Professional career ==
Maris has taught history, focusing on Asian and Southeast Asian history. She is currently a professor emeritus at UP Diliman. Her expertise in national history is primarily centered on the Philippine Revolution and on the Philippine-American War, of which her great-grandfather Ananías took part in as Governor of Capiz and the first general of the navy. Diokno has written close to a hundred publications that may be found in multiple libraries worldwide.

== Gallery ==
Maris Diokno
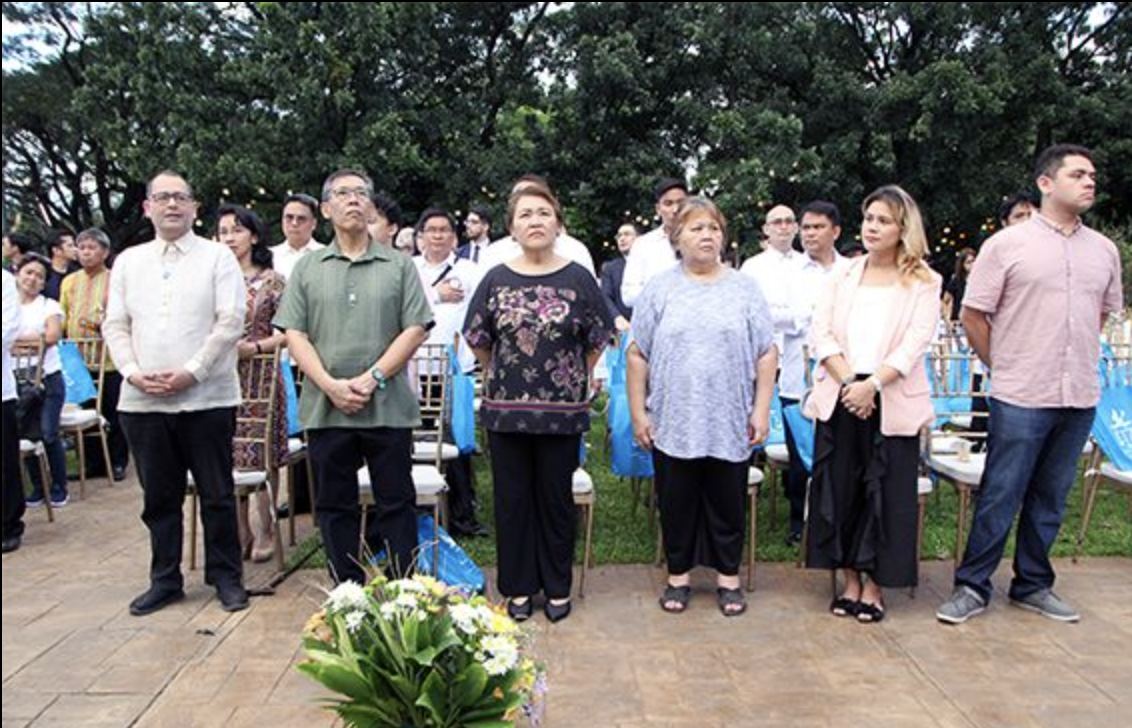
Maris with brother Chel, Chito Gascon, and sister

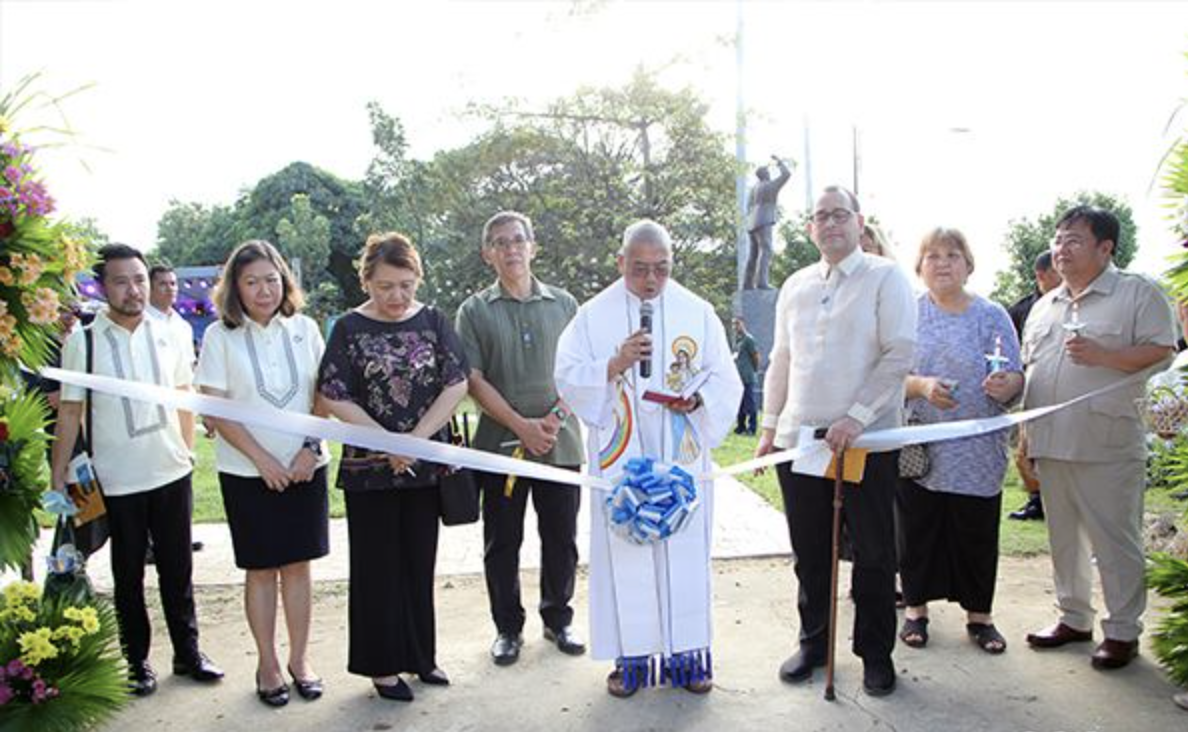
Blessing of the Liwasang Diokno, CHR Central Office

== Ancestral tree ==
Ancestors of Maris Diokno

8. Gov. Ananías Diokno
4. J. Ramón Diokno
9. Paulina Marasigan
2. Sen. Jose W. Diokno
10. Roberto Wright
5. Leonor Wright
11. Irene Garcia
1. Maria Serena Diokno
12. Alipio Bello Ycasiano
6. Abelardo Icasiano
13. Ysmaela Reyes
3. Carmen Icasiano
14. Francisco Reyes
7. Carmen Reyes
15. Macaria Baptista

== See also ==
- Diokno family
- Chel Diokno
- José W. Diokno
- Ramón Diokno
- Ananias Diokno
- Francis Garchitorena
- Pepe Diokno
- NHCP
- UP
- University of London
- CHR
