= Carmen Diokno =

Filipino Activist in the Philippines

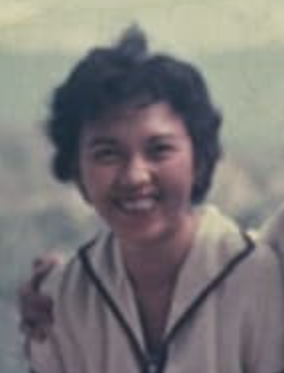
- Diokno with her husband Ka Pepe
- Born: Carmen Reyes Icasiano; November 11, 1923; Mindanao, Philippine Islands
- Died: August 26, 2011 (aged 87); Quezon City, Philippines
- Resting place: Archdiocesan Shrine of Saint John the Baptist Columbary, San Juan, Metro Manila
- Other name: Ka Nena
- Organization: KAAKBAY
- Known for: Democratic activism
- Spouse: Jose W. Diokno (m. 1949; died 1987)
- Children: 10 (including Maris, and Chel)
- Relatives: Pepe Diokno (grandson)

Carmen Reyes Icasiano Diokno (November 28, 1923 – August 26, 2011), also known as Ka Nena, was a Filipino activist. Her campaigns contributed to the United States withdrawal of its military bases from the Philippines and the push for democracy during martial law.

== Early life and education ==
Carmen Icasiano was born in Mindanao on November 11, 1923. She studied at Far Eastern University, taking up accounting, and was on her last term when World War II broke out. After the war, she worked as a waitress and was seeing American soldiers, as her parents wanted her to marry a Filipino politician named Belek Madrigal, whom she rejected. In a party hosted by Arsenio Lacson, the future mayor of Manila, she was on a date with an American colonel when she met Jose W. Diokno. The coupled talked for hours then started dating at The Aristocrat. Carmen acquired tuberculosis and frequently called Diokno while he was vacationing in the United States. Diokno found out and flew back to marry her. They married on May 28, 1949, at Ermita Church.

== Activist career ==
When her husband was imprisoned at Fort Bonifacio, she was forced to sell the house at Margarita Street, Makati City to William Tieng, then purchased the family property at 55 Third Street, New Manila, Quezon City. She found out her husband was arrested after the police arrived at their home in Makati to take her husband, then returned throwing his toothbrush, glasses, and clothes on their front yard without any explanation, which infuriated Diokno. While visiting her husband, her family and the Aquino family were frequently harassed and groped by the soldiers and para-military soldiers of the dictatorship for frisking in and out of the compound.

She joined the Kilusan sa Kapangyarihan at Karapatan ng Bayan (Movement for People's Sovereignty and Democracy) Organization or KAAKBAY, which was ideologically independent of beliefs like Marxism but was joined by fellow Marxists and Capitalists. KAAKBAY influenced the public and fought hard against the Marcos administration using non-violent activism or "pressure politics." KAAKBAY was the leading coalition of the larger coalition, the Justice for Aquino, Justice for All or JAJA, the main coalition formed to represent the anti-Marcos opposition after the Assassination of Ninoy Aquino, the senator who opposed martial law.

== Later life ==
Carmen Diokno died due to lung cancer similar to her husband, at UP Diliman while living with her daughter Maris Diokno, who was the UP Vice-president for Academic Affairs. Her funeral was held at La Salle Greenhills, the alma mater of her sons, grandsons, and great-grandchildren, as the school became co-educational.

== Personal life ==
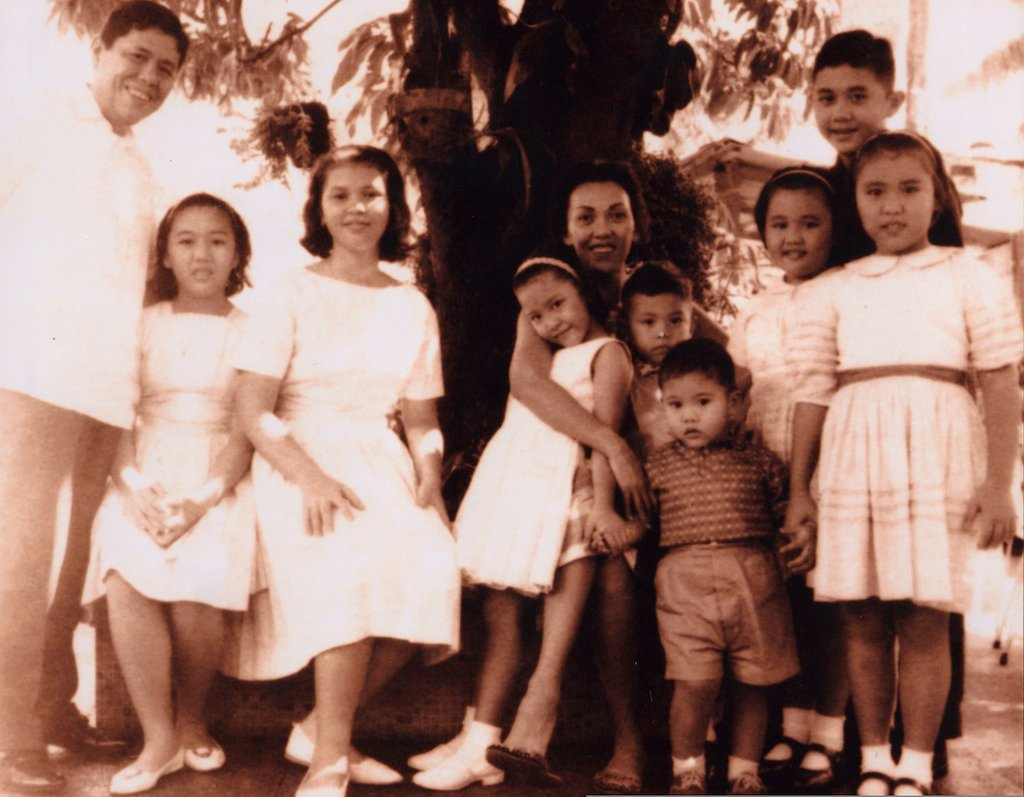
The Diokno family with eight of ten children.

The Diokno couple had 10 children. Their children were mostly named after St. Jude Thaddeus, the saint of lost causes: Carmen Leonor or Mench, who was born a year after the marriage and became college valedictorian, then first joined the garment industry with husband Emil Escay before working for NGOs; Jose Ramon or Popoy, who joined the Lopez Group of Companies that established the ABS-CBN Corporation; Maria Paz Tadea or Pat, who joined banking companies in Europe and domestically such as ComBank; Maria Serena Encarnacion or Maris, who is a nationally recognized historian; Maria Teresa Tadea or Maitet, who is a UP cum laude graduate of Economics and was executive director of a non-profit institution called IBON Foundation; Ma. Socorro Tadea or Cookie, who was secretary general of the Regional Council on Human Rights in Asia and secretary general at FLAG since 1976; Jose Miguel Tadeo or Mike, who is a US-based lawyer; Jose Manuel Tadeo or Chel, who is a dean and lawyer; Maria Victoria Tadea or Maia, also a lawyer and her father's CHR secretary; and Martin Jose Tadeo, who is a Singapore-based architect from UST and was adopted when he was two weeks old. Diokno also has at least 18 grandchildren and 11 great-grandchildren. Her children all excelled in their studies.

The couple frequently flew to other countries such as the United States and returned with books for the children, and a toy for Jose's autistic brother. They were quite devout, as they frequently had nightly rosary prayers and were devotees of St. Joseph and St. Thaddeus.

Maris Diokno, a renowned historian, is the former chair of the National Historical Commission of the Philippines, and former vice president for Academic Affairs at UP. She studied at the University of London and graduated magna cum laude.

Chel Diokno is a human rights lawyer, Chairman of FLAG, head of the Diokno Law Center and member of the Jose W. Diokno Foundation, founding Dean of the DLSU Tañada-Diokno School of Law, and former Special Counsel of the Senate Blue Ribbon Committee. Chel Diokno ran for Senator twice and nearly secured enough votes to obtain a seat. He joined the Otso Diretso coalition and Leni Robredo's coalition, which opposed the Rodrigo Duterte administration. Chel ran for the House seat under the Akbayan partylist. Duterte has been compared to the Marcos family without the privileged background or American ties of Marcos, but instead he has been seen currying favor with the Chinese Communist Party. Duterte has also committed human rights violations and like Marcos shut down the media corporation of ABS-CBN. FLAG has represented Rappler founder Maria Ressa, during court hearings filed against her by the Duterte administration for Rappler's reports on Duterte's War on Drugs and Murder of Drug Addicts.

Sen. Diokno's grandson and Chel's firstborn child, Jose Lorenzo "Pepe" Diokno is the executive director of alternative education group Rock Ed Philippines. He is best known as a motion picture director, producer, and screenwriter whose debut film, "Engkwentro" won the Venice Film Festival’s Lion of the Future Award in 2009, as well as Venice's Orizzonti Prize, the NETPAC Award for Best Asian Film, and the Gawad Urian for Best Editing. Pepe used commercials and short films to market his father Chel during his election campaigns. Pepe Diokno is also the director of Kwentong Jollibee and other commercials that have gained popularity among netizens.
