= Jose W. Diokno =

Filipino politician (1922–1987)

The Honorable Jose W. Diokno GCrL
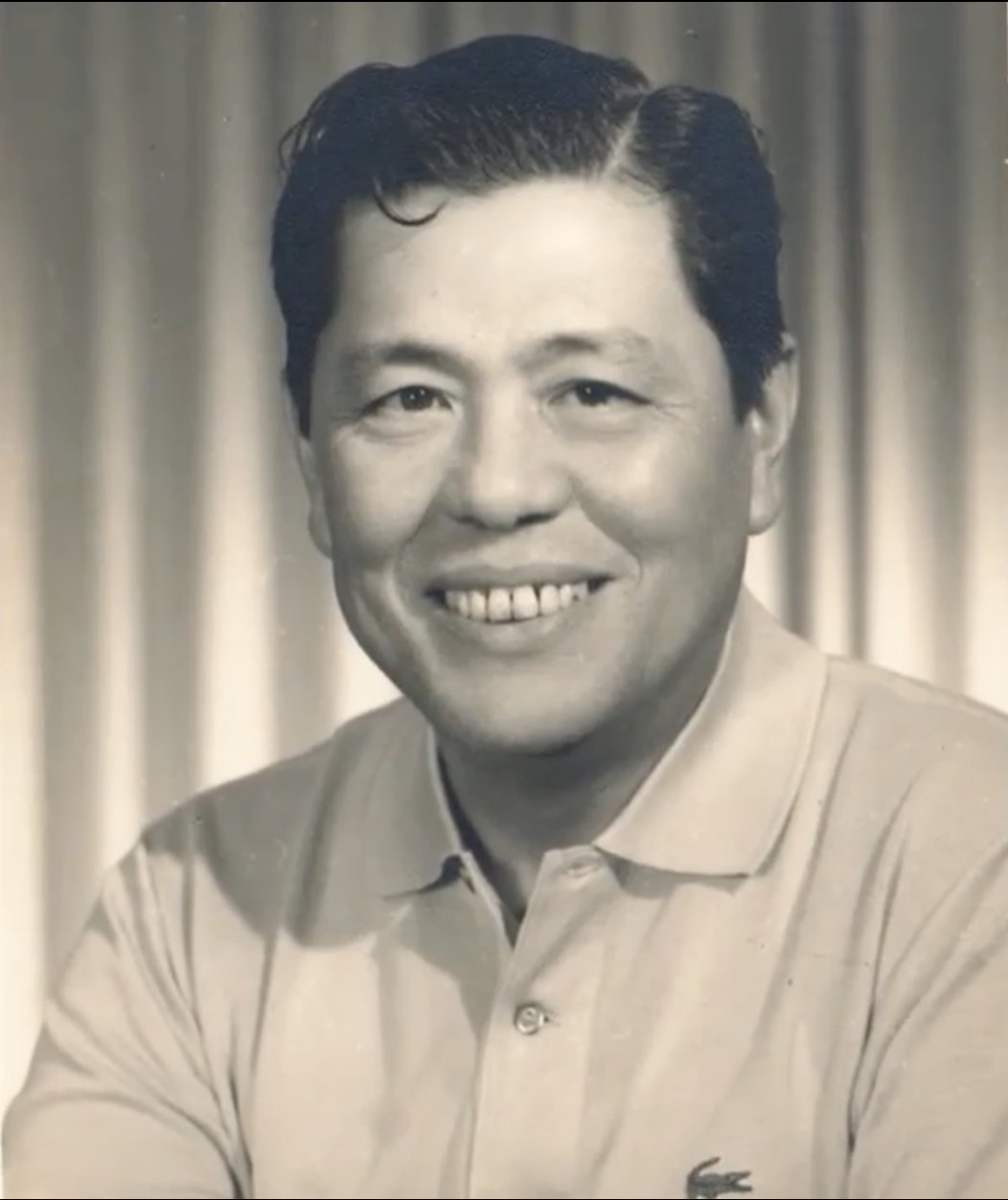
- Diokno in 1966

Senator of the Philippines
- In office December 30, 1963 – September 23, 1972 (Note: Diokno was reelected to a second and last Senate term that was abruptly terminated shortly after he was jailed—without legal basis or formal charges—by Ferdinand Marcos, immediately after the declaration of martial law.)

31st Secretary of Justice
- In office January 2, 1962 – May 19, 1962
- President: Diosdado Macapagal
- Preceded by: Alejo Mabanag
- Succeeded by: Juan Liwag

Chairman of the Presidential Committee on Human Rights
- In office March 18, 1986 – January 23, 1987
- President: Corazon Aquino

Personal details
- Born: February 26, 1922 Ermita, Manila, Philippine Islands
- Died: February 27, 1987 (aged 65) New Manila, Quezon City, Philippines
- Resting place: Archdiocesan Shrine of Saint John the Baptist Columbary, San Juan, Metro Manila
- Party: Independent (1972–1987)
- Other political affiliations: Nacionalista (1963–1972)
- Spouse: Carmen Icasiano (m. 1949)
- Relations: Ramón Diokno (father); Jose Lorenzo "Pepe" Diokno (grandson)
- Children: 10 (including Chel and Maris)
- Education: De La Salle University (BCom); University of Santo Tomas (no degree)
- Occupation: Politician, activist, journalist
- Profession: Lawyer, accountant
- Website: Diokno Site

Jose Wright Diokno GCrL (Tagalog: [ˈdʒɔknɔ]; February 26, 1922 – February 27, 1987), also known as "Ka Pepe," was a Filipino statesman, nationalist, and lawyer. Regarded as the "Father of Human Rights" in the country, he served as a Senator of the Philippines, Secretary of Justice, chairman of the Presidential Committee on Human Rights (forerunner of the Commission on Human Rights), and founder of the Free Legal Assistance Group (FLAG), which is the oldest national organization composed of human rights lawyers. Diokno is the only person to top both the Philippine Bar Examination and the board exam for Certified Public Accountants (CPA). His career was dedicated to the promotion of human rights, the defense of Philippine sovereignty, and the enactment of pro-Filipino economic legislation.

In 2004, Diokno was posthumously conferred the Order of Lakandula with the rank of Supremo—the second highest honor in the Philippines. February 27, his death anniversary and a day after his birthday, is celebrated in the Philippines as Jose W. Diokno Day.

== Early life and education ==
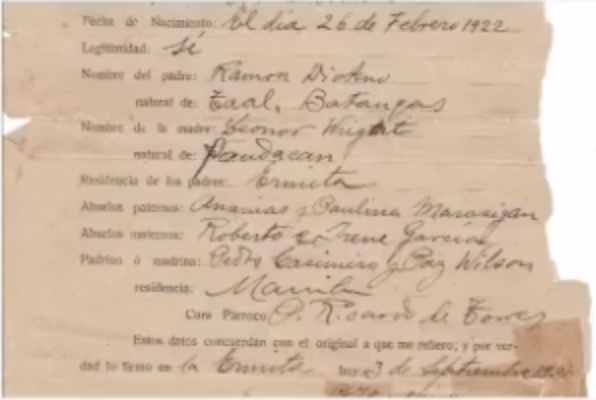
1922 Baptismal Certificate of Diokno issued in Ermita, Manila

Jose W. Diokno was born in Ermita, Manila on February 26, 1922, to Ramón Diokno y Marasigan, a former senator and Justice of the Supreme Court from Taal, Batangas, and Leonor May Wright y Garcia, an American mestiza.

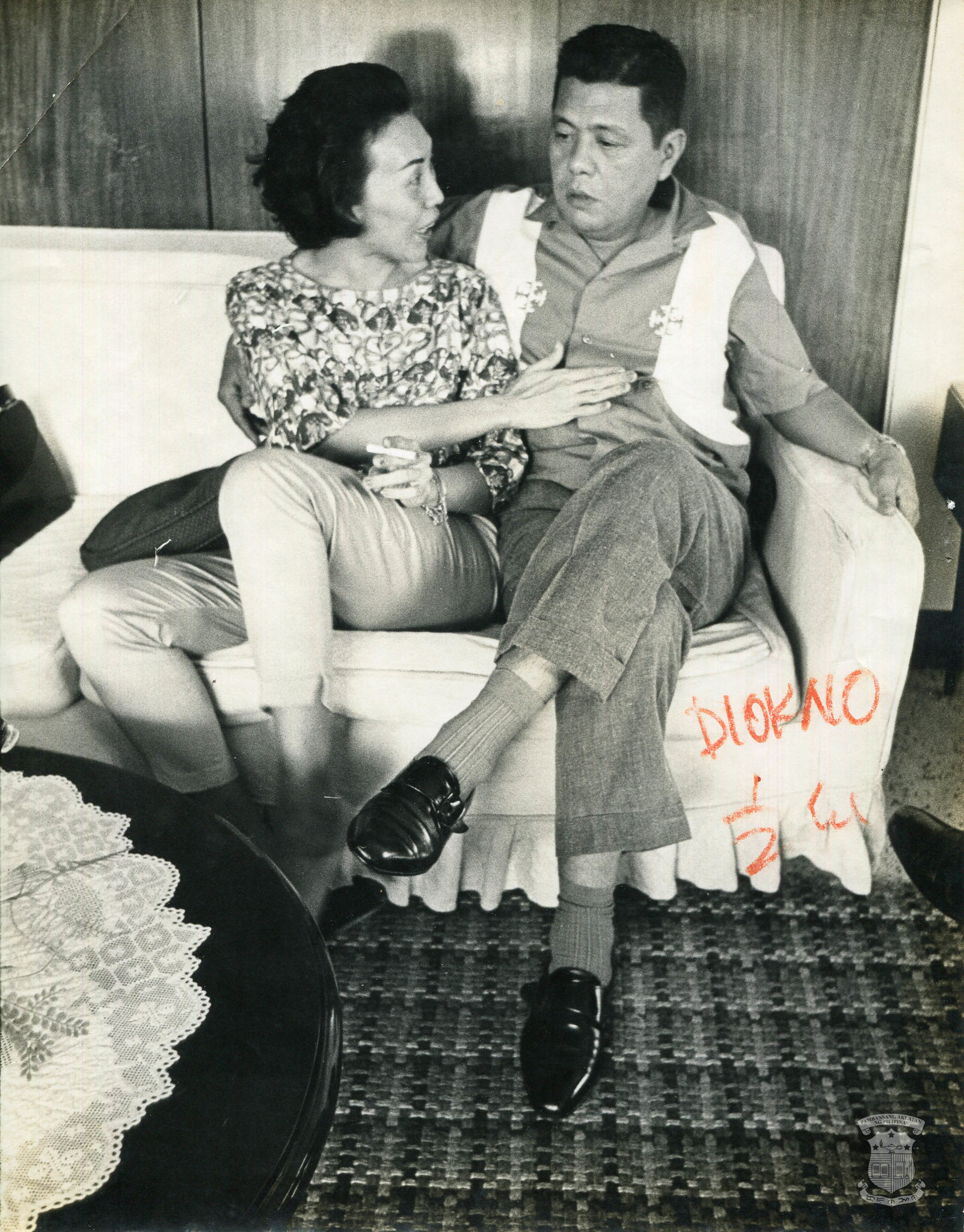
Diokno with wife Carmen

Diokno was the youngest son and the sixth of eight children, and had some half-siblings from Ramón's first spouse, Martha Fello Diokno, who died years before the birth of Diokno. Diokno grew up at 48 Alhambra Street, Ermita, Manila (Note: The family also owned property at No. 8 Calle Real (now M.H. Del Pilar St.), Ermita, Manila based on a complaint filed by Leonor W. Diokno against the city (G.R. No. L-24433).) and was baptized at Ermita Church on September 3, 1922.

Ramón Diokno was considered an anti-imperialist nationalist as senator and was one of four senators to oppose the American Parity Rights Amendment. Jose's grandfather was Ananías Diokno, a navy general and governor in the Philippine Revolution and the Philippine–American War in the Visayas. Ananías's maternal great-great grandfather was Félix Berenguer de Marquina y Fitzgerald, who was viceroy of New Spain and governor-general of the Philippines from 1788 to 1793. Berenguer de Marquina had an extramarital affair with a Chinese mestiza from Cagsawa, Albay named Demetria Sumulong y Lindo and sired one daughter. He abandoned this family to repatriate to Spain and later became the lieutenant-general of the navy in 1799. He was said to be an incompetent but persevering governor. Despite this mixed ancestry, Diokno would later often say that he was "100% Filipino."

As a young 12-year-old boy, Diokno would go with his father to trials in the provinces. He would carry his father's bag, and sit on a small chair reserved for him behind the counsel's table. He learned English through a private tutor during the American Commonwealth period, as the family usually spoke in Spanish. Growing up, Diokno relished having Spanish dishes at home, namely tapas or side dishes such as angulas, white embutido, galantina, and chorizos. He liked Filipino food as well and enjoyed rice mixed with gatas ng kalabaw (carabao's milk), raw eggs, and tapang usa (cured venison). Diokno also joined Nilad Lodge No. 12, a masonic lodge, as his father and many revolutionaries did before him.

In 1937, after repeated acceleration Diokno graduated high school as the valedictorian at De La Salle College (DLSC), and went on to take a Bachelor of Science degree in commerce, also at DLSC. He was an ROTC lieutenant, dramatist, writer, and student leader. He later developed a skill in photography and owned a studio. Diokno initially wanted to study mechanical engineering, but eventually compromised with his parents to take up commerce since his parents wanted a major that featured legal studies. He realized he enjoyed the legal courses the most and decided to take up law once he finished his undergraduate studies. He graduated from college summa cum laude. Diokno took the CPA board examinations in 1940—for which he had to secure special dispensation, since he was too young. He topped the CPA with a grade of 91.18. However, since Diokno was too young when he passed the CPA exam, he could not receive a proper license until he was twenty-one, which led him to pursue his law studies like his half-brother.

After Diokno enrolled at the University of Santo Tomas in 1940, his studies were interrupted by the outbreak of WWII in 1941 in his second year. When the war was over, he was granted a special dispensation by the Supreme Court of the Philippines and was allowed to take the Philippine Bar Examination despite having never completed his degree. He topped the 1944 bar exam (Note: Listed as Roll No. 5, Diokno was the first Filipino lawyer to take the oath and appear on the Roll of Attorneys, released on July 26, 1945 and published every year by the Supreme Court after the Bar Exam results.) together with a 24 year old future ally named Jovito Salonga with a score of 95.3, the highest since the language of instruction switched to English. As a reward, he took a solo vacation in the United States, where he would frequently call Carmen "Nena" Icasiano, a commerce student from Bulacan studying at Far Eastern University. They met in 1946 at a dinner party hosted by future Manila mayor Arsenio Lacson. Diokno was with Baby Quezon, who was the daughter of Manuel Quezon, while Carmen was with an American colonel, but both immediately spent the evening conversing with each other after being assigned to the same table. Diokno started courting her, refusing to listen to his father's wishes to marry Chief Justice José Abad Santos's daughter. Diokno quickly returned from his trip to propose to her after he found out on the telephone that she had tuberculosis and had missed seeing him. He married Icasiano at Ermita Church in 1949. (Note: The Diokno family at this point lived at 125 Aguado St., San Miguel, Manila based on Diokno's marriage certificate.)

== Rising lawyer ==
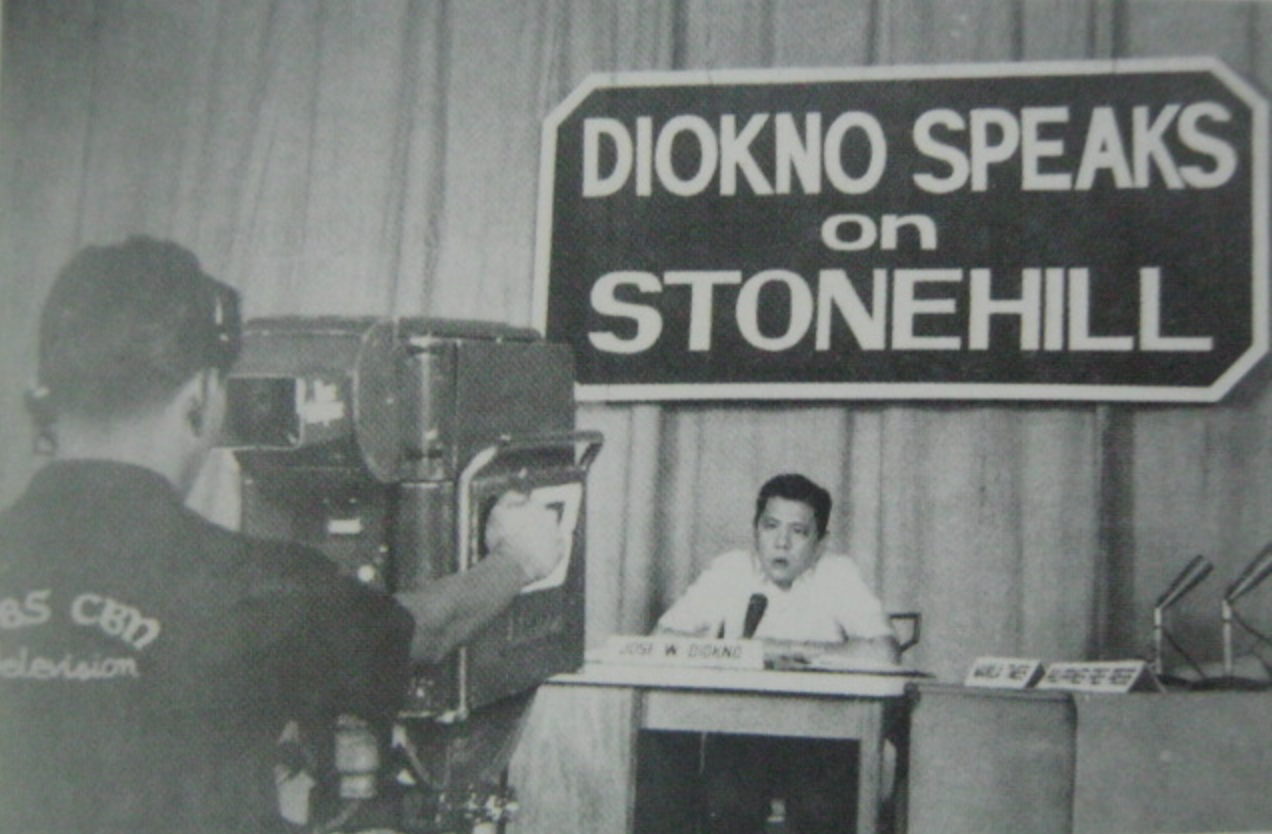
Sec. Diokno speaking out at a televised conference

Immediately after topping the Bar exam, Diokno embarked on his law practice at his father's bupete or law office, handling and winning high-profile cases including Vera v. Avelino, G.R. L-543, on behalf of his father, Sen. Ramón Diokno, who let the young Diokno quickly take over the bupete. Diokno also successfully fought libel charges against radio personality and Manila Mayor Arsenio Lacson, who was a close friend and would often visit Diokno and his wife in the wee hours at their home in Parañaque to prepare them breakfast. Diokno would in turn edit Mayor Lacson's newspaper columns for Free Philippines. Historians learned a few years after Mayor Lacson's sudden passing that Lacson even intended for Diokno to be his running mate, as the Manila Mayor's fame made him the top presidential candidate for the 1965 election. Diokno served in different committees under President Ramon Magsaysay, and by 1958, Diokno gained enough stature to be selected to join a special committee to investigate the Department of Finance. He was later invited to return to investigate anomalies happening in the Bureau of Supply Corrections.

== Secretary of Justice ==
With his reputation as a legal practitioner established and secured, in December 1961, Diokno found out through the news that he was to be appointed as Secretary of Justice by President Diosdado Macapagal through Mayor Lacson's influence.

In March 1962, Diokno ordered a raid on a firm owned by Harry S. Stonehill, an American businessman who was suspected of tax evasion and bribing public officials, among other crimes. Diokno's investigation of Stonehill further revealed corruption within government ranks, and as Secretary of Justice, he prepared to prosecute those involved. However, President Macapagal intervened, negotiating a deal that absolved Stonehill in exchange for his deportation, then ordered Diokno to resign. Diokno only learned of his resignation from the news and received death threats from supporters of the president, which prompted him to rely on Mayor Lacson's special security. Diokno questioned Macapagal's actions, saying, "How can the government now prosecute the corrupted when it has allowed the corrupter to go?" Macapagal would become unpopular and eventually lose the next election in 1965 to another controversial politician also connected with Stonehill named Ferdinand Marcos.

== Senator ==
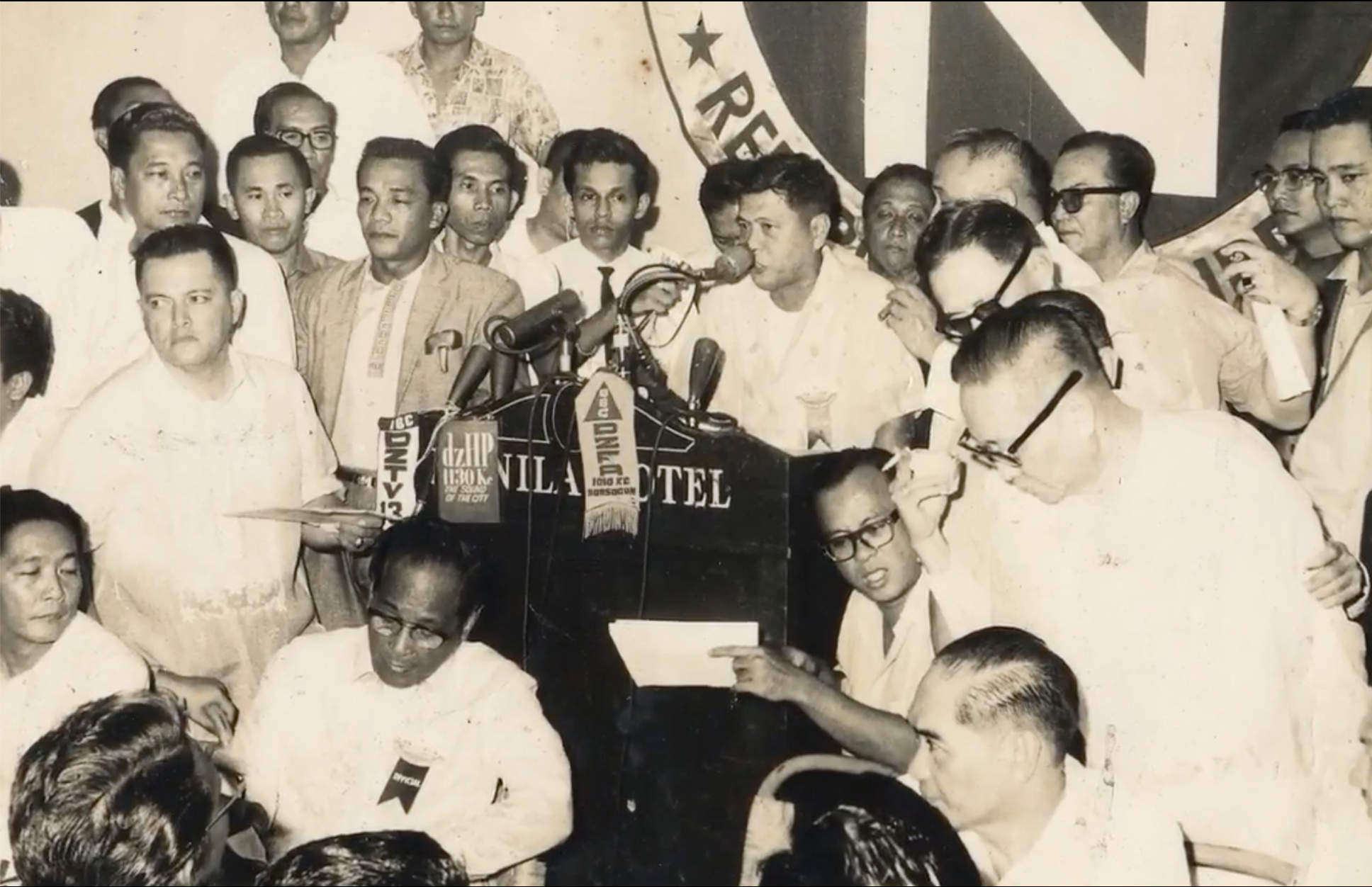
Diokno speaking at the Manila Hotel

In 1963, Diokno ran for senator under the Nacionalista Party and won with almost half of the popular vote.

His laws and bills were often considered nationalistic in essence, as he called for the creation of the Equal Pay for Equal Work Act, which would ban discrimination of Filipinos in American companies. The infamous ex-president of San Miguel Corp. named Andy Soriano of the Philippine Association and US Ambassador Bill Blair Jr. controversially fought to have the bill vetoed before they stepped down. Diokno often fought American policies that involved transfer pricing.

For his performance as legislator and fight for nationalism, Diokno was named Outstanding Senator by the Philippines Free Press from 1967 to 1970, making him the only legislator to receive the recognition for four successive years. In 1968, Diokno was awarded as the Outstanding CPA in Government Service by the Philippine Institute of Certified Public Accountants. Diokno also served as the delegate for many commissions including the United Nations General Assembly in the middle of the 1960s. Diokno was also honored as the most outstanding senator by the Philippine Government Employees Association (PGEA) with a PGEA Plaque of Honor in December 1971, among other awards.

=== Chairmanship of the Economic Affairs Committee ===
The Board of Investments was created by Sen. Diokno's Investment Incentives Act in 1967.

Senator Diokno became chairman of the Senate Economic Affairs Committee, and worked for the passage of pro-Filipino legislation, including what is considered to be the most important incentive law in the country, RA 5186, also known as the Investment Incentives Act of 1967, which provides incentives to mostly Filipino investors and entrepreneurs that would place control of the Philippine economy predominantly in the hands of Filipinos. The law would also be the first groundbreaking initiative of the Philippine economy to gradually step out of its import substitution mindset. It also led to the foundation of the Board of Investments, the premier government agency responsible for propagating investments in the Philippines.

Diokno then authored RA 6173 or the Oil Industry Commission Act of 1971, which created the Oil Industry Commission (OIC) to regulate oil pricing in different companies. This eventually led to the dominance of three oil companies in Caltex, the alternative name of the American corporation Chevron, Petron, a local partner of Middle-Eastern Saudi Aramco and is owned by the brewery San Miguel Corporation, and Shell based in the Netherlands.

==== Laws and bills authored ====
- Investment Incentives Act, RA 5186;
- Export Incentives Act, RA 6135;
- Oil Industry Commission Act, RA 6173;
- Joint Resolution No. 2;
- Revised Election Law;
- An Act Further Amending the Armed Forces Retirement Act, RA 4902;
- Equal Pay for Equal Work Act;
- Movie Industry Bill;
- Bill to Streamline the Appeals Process at the Court of Agrarian Relations;
- Bill to Provide Benefits to Municipal and City Judges;
- Bill to Create Circuit Criminal Courts;
- Bill to Nationalize Domestic Credit Usage;

=== Civil rights activism ===
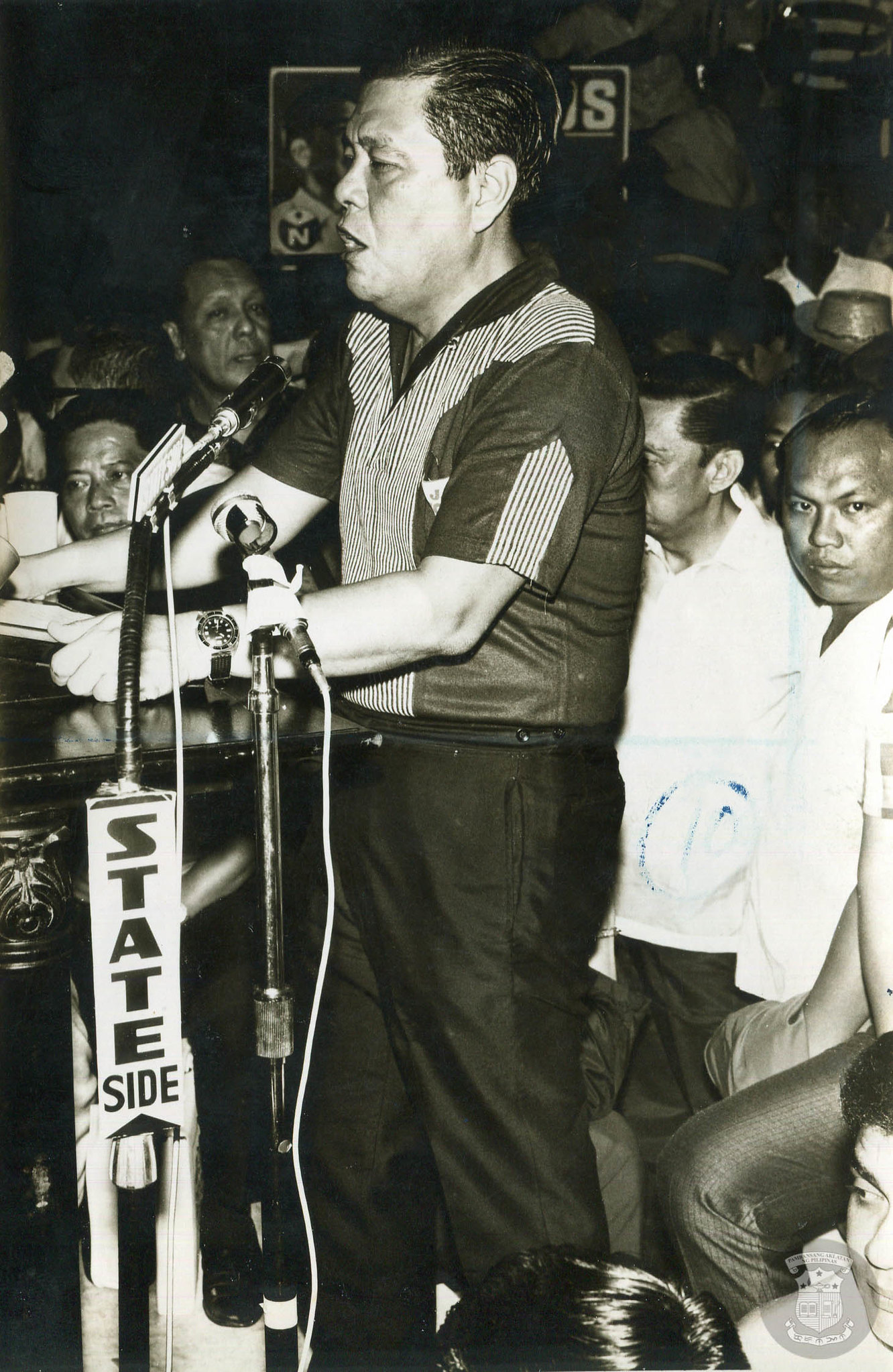
Diokno making a speech

When Marcos suspended the fundamental legal right of the writ of habeas corpus following the bombing of the Plaza Miranda gathering of Liberal Party members, Diokno resigned from the Nacionalista Party on August 31 in protest and took to the streets. Sen. Diokno called on students to start protesting against the administration, anticipating that Marcos, who was nearing the end of his last term, would declare martial law and change the constitution to give himself absolute power.

Previously, Marcos began building notoriety following the Jabidah massacre, where an estimated 14 to as much as 68 alleged Muslim youths were gunned down in Corregidor by unknown armed men in 1968. Following this event, a Moro insurgency would quickly develop, starting in Mindanao; it would evolve into a widespread armed-conflict that would engulf the nation decades after Marcos's lifetime. Marcos tried to suppress the media and block coverage of the event, but it was too late. Diokno and many other senators sensed Marcos might have developed a hidden agenda. From then on, Diokno began to put greater emphasis on human rights in public speeches and events. In an oft-quoted 1981 speech, he would declare, "No cause is more worthy than the cause of human rights. Human rights are more than legal concepts: they are the essence of man. They are what makes a man human. That is why they are called human rights: deny them and you deny man's humanity."

He was the leader of the Movement of Concerned Citizens for Civil Liberties (MCCCL), which organized a series of rallies from 1971 to 1972. The most massive of these rallies involved 50,000 protestors and was held on September 21, 1972, shortly before the imposition of martial law by the Marcos dictatorship. During this rally, protestors denounced the infamous Oplan Sagittarius, the devious operation plan by Marcos to declare martial law. Sen. Benigno "Ninoy" Aquino Jr. exposed the Oplan Sagittarius scandal earlier in a September 13 speech, and spoke to the Senate on September 21, the same day that the MCCCL held their exceptionally large rally at Plaza Miranda. Marcos reacted with fear of deposition and immediately finalized Proclamation No. 1081, which declared nationwide martial law at 8:00 p.m. later that evening. Exactly the next day on September 22, 1972, at 8:00 p.m., Defense Minister Juan Ponce Enrile was told to exit his car near Wack-Wack village. Another vehicle carrying gunmen arrived and stopped near an electrical post, right beside Enrile's vehicle. They then alighted from their vehicle and began to fire at the large sedan of Enrile to give an impression of a terrorist ambush, setting the stage for Marcos's theatrical television announcement.

== Martial law years ==
=== Imprisonment and organized coalitions ===
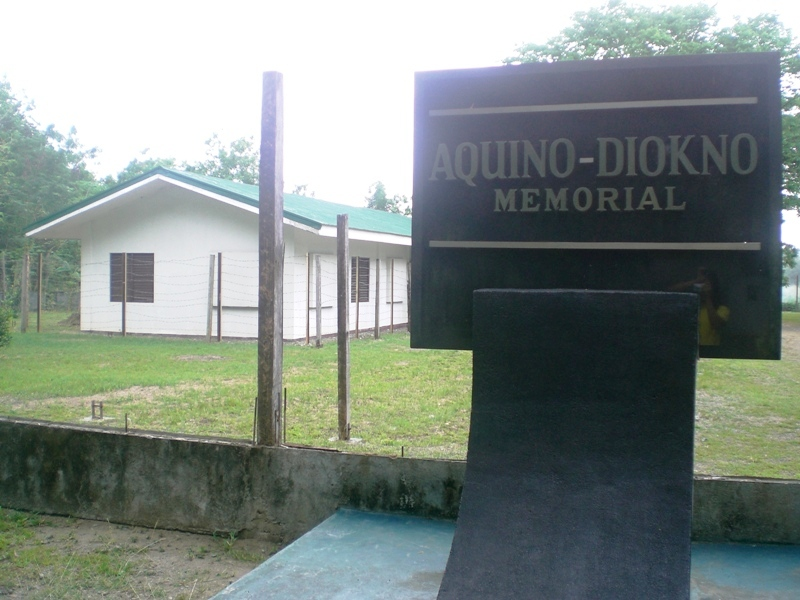
The Aquino-Diokno Memorial and AFP Center for Human Rights at Fort Magsaysay

On September 23, 1972, Diokno's second term as senator was officially cut short when Marcos announced martial law on television at 7:17 p.m.

At 1:00 a.m. before the announcement, Diokno was arrested by the Marcos dictatorial regime. After cutting communication lines in multiple neighborhoods, including Diokno's home, six carloads carrying forty armed soldiers visited Diokno at his home at 12 Margarita Street, Magallanes Village, Makati to "invite" him for questioning. He changed from his pajamas and was sent to Camp Crame. They had no warrant. After Diokno was brought to Camp Crame, he was transferred to Fort Bonifacio, where he was detained along with other opposition members such as Aquino and Chino Roces, the founder and head of The Manila Times, the leading newspaper at the time. The military's Defense Minister Enrile offered a security detail to Diokno "to protect (him) from Communist assassins," to which Diokno laughed and responded that he really needed protection from the military.

Diokno and Aquino, whom the dictatorship considered their foremost opponents, were later handcuffed to chopper seats, blindfolded, and flown out to be solitarily confined at Fort Magsaysay, located in the municipality of Laur, Nueva Ecija. They remained confined to Fort Magsaysay for exactly thirty days. They both learned of each other's presence through singing. One of them would frequently sing the national anthem Lupang Hinirang or "Chosen Land," to which the other would reply by singing Bayan Ko or "My Country" to prove he was still alive. From the fish being served by the cook Aling Cely, who later became the museum curator of the converted national memorial called the "Aquino-Diokno Memorial," Diokno was able to correctly deduce that he was detained in Nueva Ecija, particularly in Fort Magsaysay. To tally the number of days, Diokno used rope knots from his mosquito net as well as the back of a soap packaging box and crossed out each day in the manner of a calendar.

Once both were brought back to Fort Bonifacio, his visiting family members were often strip-searched by soldiers with intent to commit blatant harassment. They would sneak in books in French and Spanish for him to read, while the children would serenade with a guitar as he would converse to his wife in Spanish for only them to hear and comprehend. Diokno would tell his family not to weep in front of the sadistic soldiers. Only his godmother Paz Wilson, a nonagenarian, and a mother figure throughout his childhood and since his mother's death, would frequently cry during every visit. She continued to visit despite also undergoing full-body strip searches. The family would be in tears once they left the prison, where the Aquino family would see them. This helped the Aquinos prepare themselves emotionally since they never saw the Diokno family manifest much pain before. Nena Diokno, suspicious of Marcos, took most of her husband's books at the library of his bupete on M.H. del Pilar and brought them home before the military burned down the building. Jose would thank her as he was very familiar with the library and memorized the location of each shelf and book he read. Outside the prison, Marcos announced at his executive mansion, Malacañang Palace that September 21 would be known as "National Thanksgiving Day," the same day Diokno led his biggest Plaza Miranda rally. This declaration has led to a general confusion about the true date of the public announcement of martial law, which was actually on September 23, two days after Proclamation No. 1081 was signed.

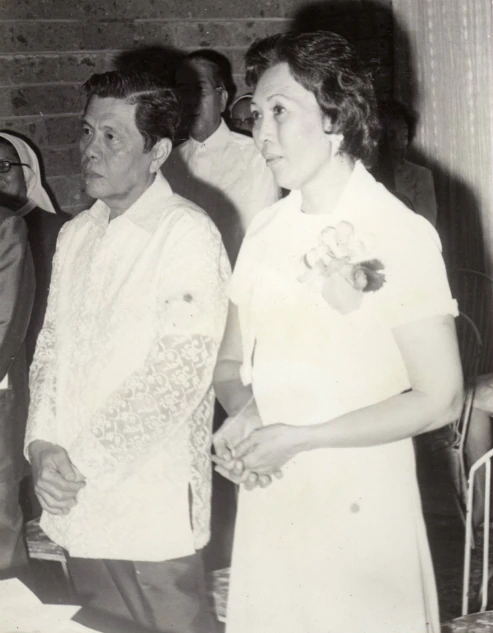
Sen. Diokno celebrating with Carmen their silver wedding anniversary while he was still under custody on March 28, 1974

Diokno spent 718 days, or nearly two years in detention, mainly at the maximum security compound of Fort Bonifacio. While Aquino was charged with subversion, no charge was ever filed against Diokno. Diokno was released arbitrarily on September 11, 1974—Marcos's 57th birthday. After his release, Sen. Diokno mentioned in an interview that he served as an instructor teaching law courses, especially Remedial Law and Human Rights, at the University of the Philippines (UP) College of Law at its request after he was released from Fort Bonifacio. This continued until Marcos found out and had him banned from the national public university, though Diokno continued returning for speeches and conferences, and was later honored with a mural of him and other martial law heroes at the school's main college building of Palma Hall.

A year later, in 1975, Diokno was chosen as chairman of the Civil Liberties Union, a position he held until 1982. Under his chairmanship, CLU issued a formal statement in 1978 declaring that the President Marcos and martial law were not the main threats to Philippine democracy, but "US imperialism, without which martial law would never have been installed."

Later in March 1983, Diokno founded the Kilusan sa Kapangyarihan at Karapatan ng Bayan (Movement for People's Sovereignty and Democracy) Organization or KAAKBAY, which was ideologically moderate and distinct from other beliefs such as Marxism but was joined by fellow Marxists and Capitalists. KAAKBAY influenced the public and fought hard against the Marcos administration using non-violent activism or "pressure politics." KAAKBAY later elevated pressure politics as an important principle for post-democracy through its publication called "The Plaridel Papers." The August 1984 edition of The Plaridel Papers popularized the concept of pressure politics and introduced a political system that would involve the "parliament-of-the-streets" in building a "popular democracy." KAAKBAY was also one of the main member organizations of the Justice for Aquino, Justice for All (JAJA) coalition, which was founded by Diokno on August 25, 1983, following Ninoy Aquino's assassination for returning to the country to face Marcos. JAJA was the first united front against Marcos, but it did not last long. KAAKBAY served as the main coalition that kept the other extreme groups from leaving JAJA. JAJA was later replaced by the relatively leftist Coalition of Organizations for the Restoration of Democracy (CORD) in mid-1984, which had almost the same members. Before the creation of CORD, many former JAJA members who disagreed with the communists also organized a much wider alliance called the Kongreso ng Mamamayang Pilipino (KOMPIL) or the Congress of the Filipino People, and was mainly headed by Diokno.

From January 7 to 8, 1984, 2,300 delegates representing all sectors gathered at the KOMPIL congress to vote on multiple issues. One of the decisions voted by 60% of the attendees was to establish a new Commission on Elections (COMELEC). Elected leaders included statesmen such as Diokno, Lorenzo Tañada, Aquilino Pimentel, Cecilia Muñoz-Palma, Ambrosio Padilla, Salvador Laurel, and Jovito Salonga. Others came from non-political sectors, including Makati's Enrique Zobel, who was related to Andy Soriano and due to consanguinity was part of the Ayala Corporation. Another leader was Cardinal Jaime Sin, who would play an important role two years later for the opposition. Of all the issues, the largest was concerning a letter they made called the Call for Meaningful Elections (CAMEL). Some including Diokno and Aquino's brother Butz preferred to boycott any election to avoid legitimizing the Marcos rule. On the other hand, some of the other signatories preferred to participate in the elections, including Ninoy Aquino's widow, Corazon Cojuangco-Aquino.

In May 1985, Diokno was elected as the first president of the Bagong Alyansang Makabayan (Bayan) alliance during its first congress. His position as president would be short-lived, however, with him resigning some months later due to reportedly becoming uneasy about the growing influence of the Communist Party of the Philippines (CPP) and its National Democratic Front (NDF) in the alliance.

Diokno was a part of multiple organizations and alliances that fought the administration and foreign intervention. He continued to attack the different policies of the Marcos administration, such as their controversial nuclear programs that led to the sabotaged construction of the costly Bataan Nuclear Power Plant, thereby infuriating Marcos. Diokno continued to serve as the leader behind ceasing Marcos's numerous incomplete projects.

=== Human rights work ===
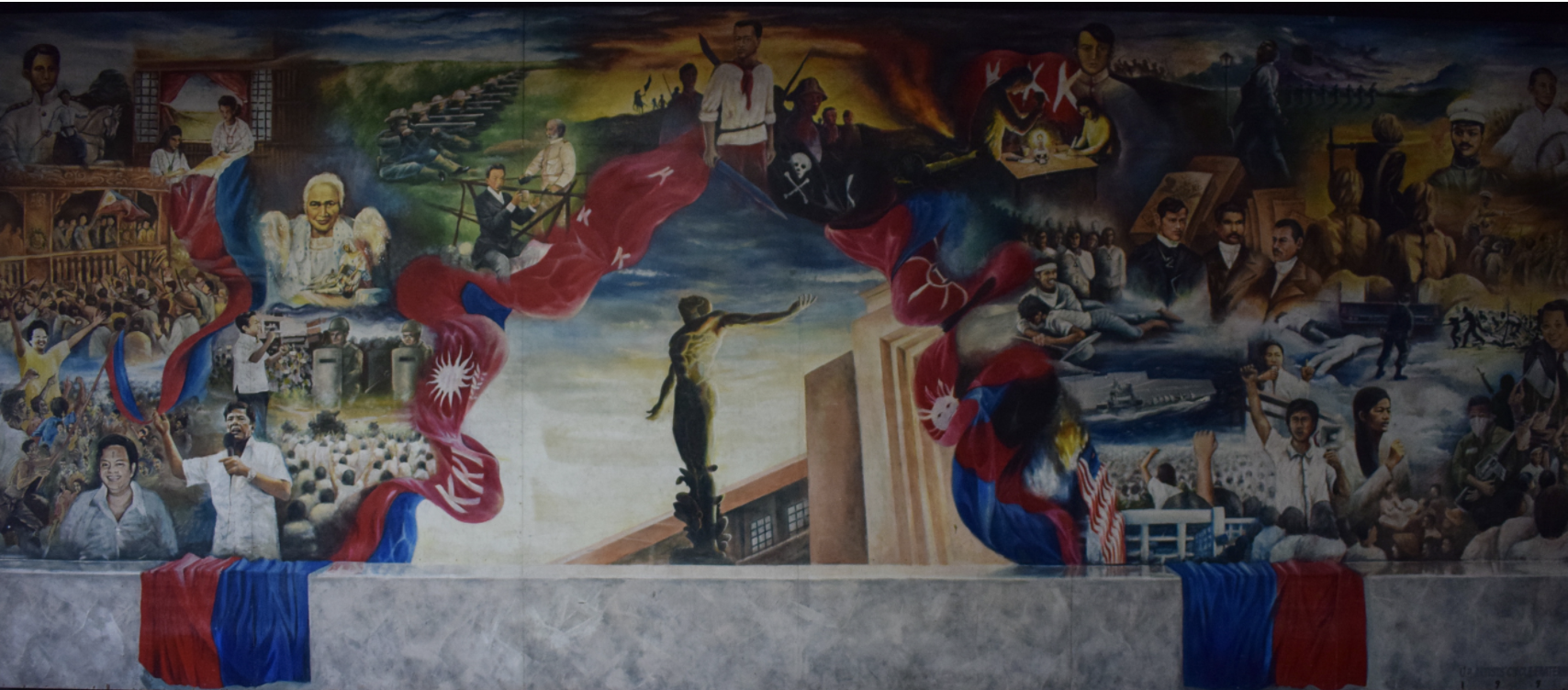
Diokno at the lower left of a painting at UP holding a microphone

Immediately after his release, Diokno set up the Free Legal Assistance Group (FLAG) in 1974, which gave free legal services to the victims of martial law. It was the first and largest association of human rights attorneys ever assembled in the nation. In court, Diokno personally defended tribal groups, peasants, social workers threatened by exploitation, and military atrocities, which he represented pro-bono. FLAG popularized developmental legal aid and even doled out allowances to its clients. This has led to new laws requiring newly sworn in lawyers to provide free legal assistance for a certain amount of time. FLAG handled 90 percent of human rights cases in the country as well as built programs to educate citizens about human rights. Diokno was also involved in documenting cases of torture, summary execution, and disappearances under the Marcos regime.

Diokno had no fear of being arrested again, and went around and outside the Philippines, spreading a message of hope and democracy. In another oft-quoted speech, he once quipped:

And so law in the land died. I grieve for it but I do not despair over it. I know, with a certainty no argument can turn, no wind can shake, that from its dust will rise a new and better law: more just, more human, and more humane. When that will happen, I know not. That it will happen, I know.

Diokno also held an important role in Southeast Asia leading a group of senior human rights lawyers from Thailand, Indonesia, Malaysia, and the Philippines in forming the Regional Council on Human Rights in Asia. The group was one of the first non-governmental organizations (NGOs) built to promote human rights in Southeast Asia. On December 9, 1983, in Manila, the Regional Council formalized the first human rights declaration of Southeast Asia called the Declaration of the Basic Duties of ASEAN Peoples and Governments. Although the council paved the way for future human rights declarations by other organizations like the United Nations, their momentum gradually declined decades after the Marcos regime ended. Diokno was also, inter alia, the chairman of the first Human Rights Information and Documentation Systems, International (HURIDOCS) assembly in Strasbourg, France, which was a historic event that involved over two hundred representatives. HURIDOCS founder Hans Thoolen said years later in a tribute to Diokno that he witnessed Diokno present novel ideas on practical ways to defend human rights victims at the 1983 SOS-Torture constituent assembly held in Geneva, Switzerland, and that Diokno frequently disseminated human rights primers published in the common vernacular for mass audiences.

== Final years ==
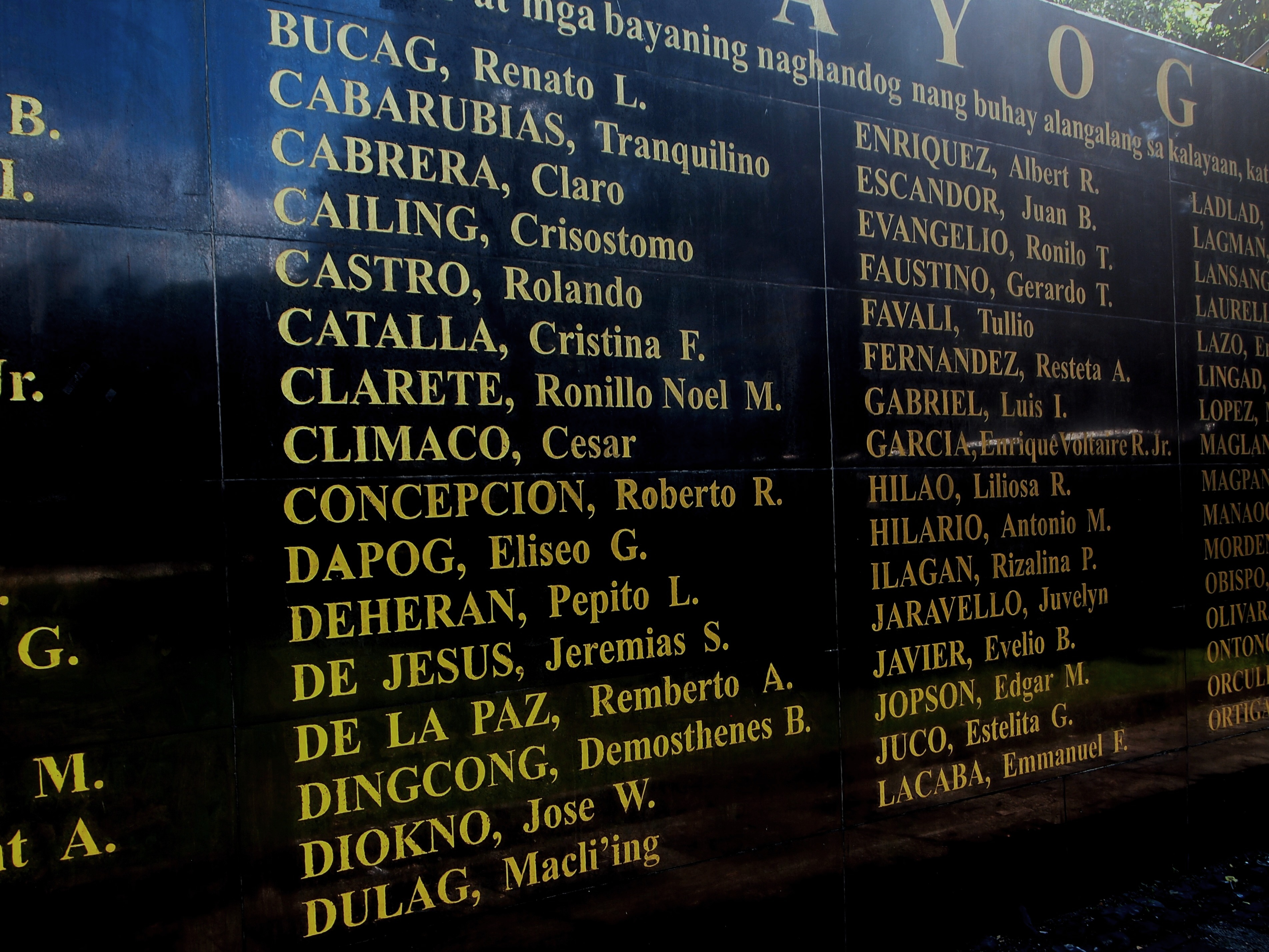
Detail of Jose W. Diokno's name in the Wall of Remembrance at the Bantayog ng mga Bayani

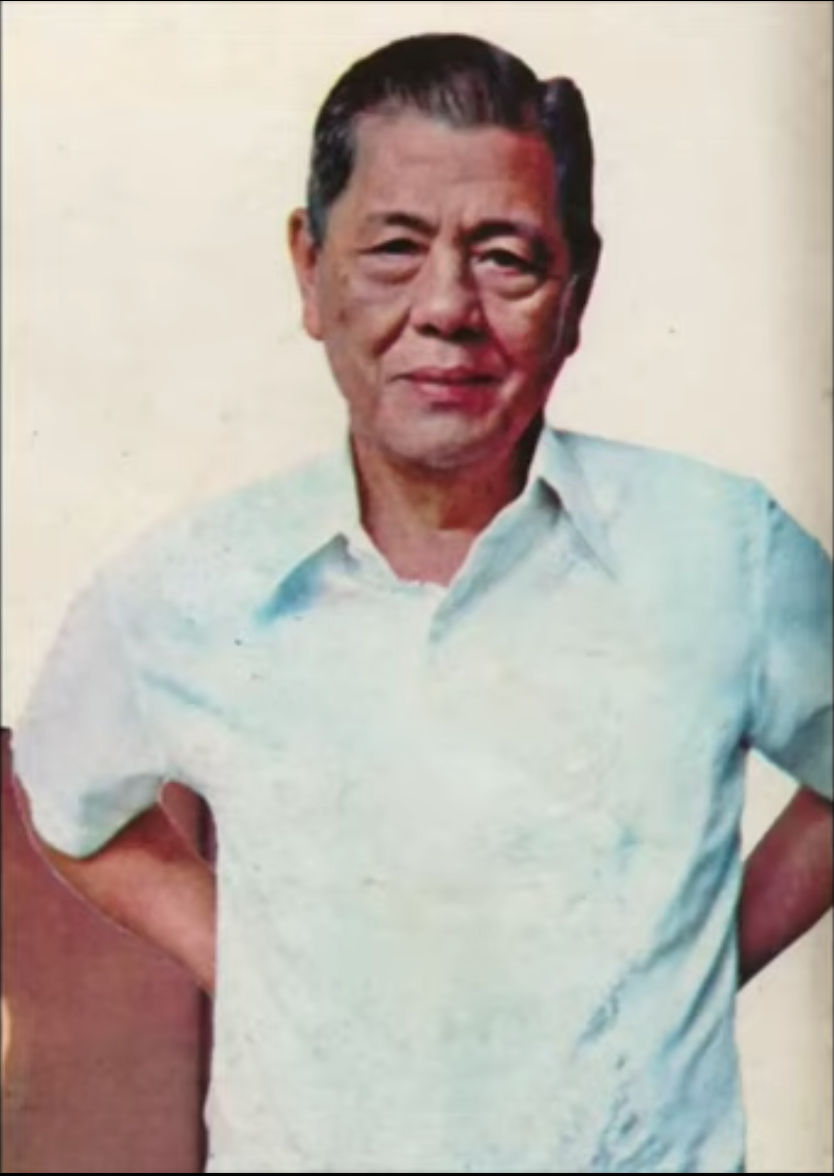
Diokno in the 1980s

=== People Power and final years ===
After founding JAJA together with friend and former Sen. Lorenzo M. Tañada, Diokno was chosen to serve as chairman of its executive committee. The two leaders were the only members to call for a boycott in the upcoming, nationwide Batasan Elections, predicting that it would be fixed.

Eventually public outcries after the election results came out with Marcos winning led to the 1986 People Power Revolution that peacefully ousted the Marcos family out of the country. Diokno was appointed by the new President Corazon Cojuangco-Aquino or Cory, wife of the slain Ninoy Aquino and mother of the future 15th president, Benigno "Noynoy" Aquino, to serve as founding chairman of the Presidential Committee on Human Rights, now the Commission on Human Rights (CHR), and tasked to lead a government panel to negotiate for the return of rebel forces to the government folds. Diokno helped write the 1987 Constitution, particularly Article XIII defining social justice and human rights. Diokno was also the principal negotiator in peace talks with the National Democratic Front of the Philippines, the main leftist coalition founded during martial law. One of the Constitutional Commissioners and KAAKBAY member Ed Garcia frequented Diokno's New Manila home before the ratification of the Constitution. Commissioner Jose Nolledo cited Diokno as an inspiration behind the human rights and public health provisions that were pro-poor and nationalistic.

In May 1984, even before People Power and its preceding, rigged Batasan Elections, Diokno had been diagnosed with terminal lung cancer. He obtained a high fever and was brought to the Stanford University Medical Center where he learned of his disease. He had smoked all his adult life. Diokno visited the San Francisco University Hospital to have a brain scan and found a brain tumor. He would return home. On July 4, 1986, which was the U.S. independence day, Diokno had a series of debates with Minister Enrile, convincing him that U.S. bases should be removed from the country. Enrile, who betrayed Marcos and joined the new administration, was inspired by this debate and would later become senator and help vote to oust the American military from the country. Diokno returned to the United States on September 3, 1986 for treatment. Eventually after having a transfusion a month later at Manila Doctors Hospital, Diokno decided to stop all treatments and returned to his final residence at 55 3rd St., New Manila, Quezon City, to spend his days reading and writing cases. This was after he had to shave his hair off and already experienced a declining vision. He continued to work all out for four more months, despite his illness, until his passing on February 27, 1987, at 2:40 a.m.—one day after his 65th birthday at home in New Manila. Diokno had spent the last decade of his life making documentaries and speeches, and leading different coalitions and rallies on the streets. His funeral was held at the National Shrine of Our Lady of Mt. Carmel in New Manila, and he was buried at Manila Memorial Park - Sucat but later reinterred at Pinaglabanan Church on October 6, 1996.

== Legacy ==
=== Honors, awards, and historical reputation ===
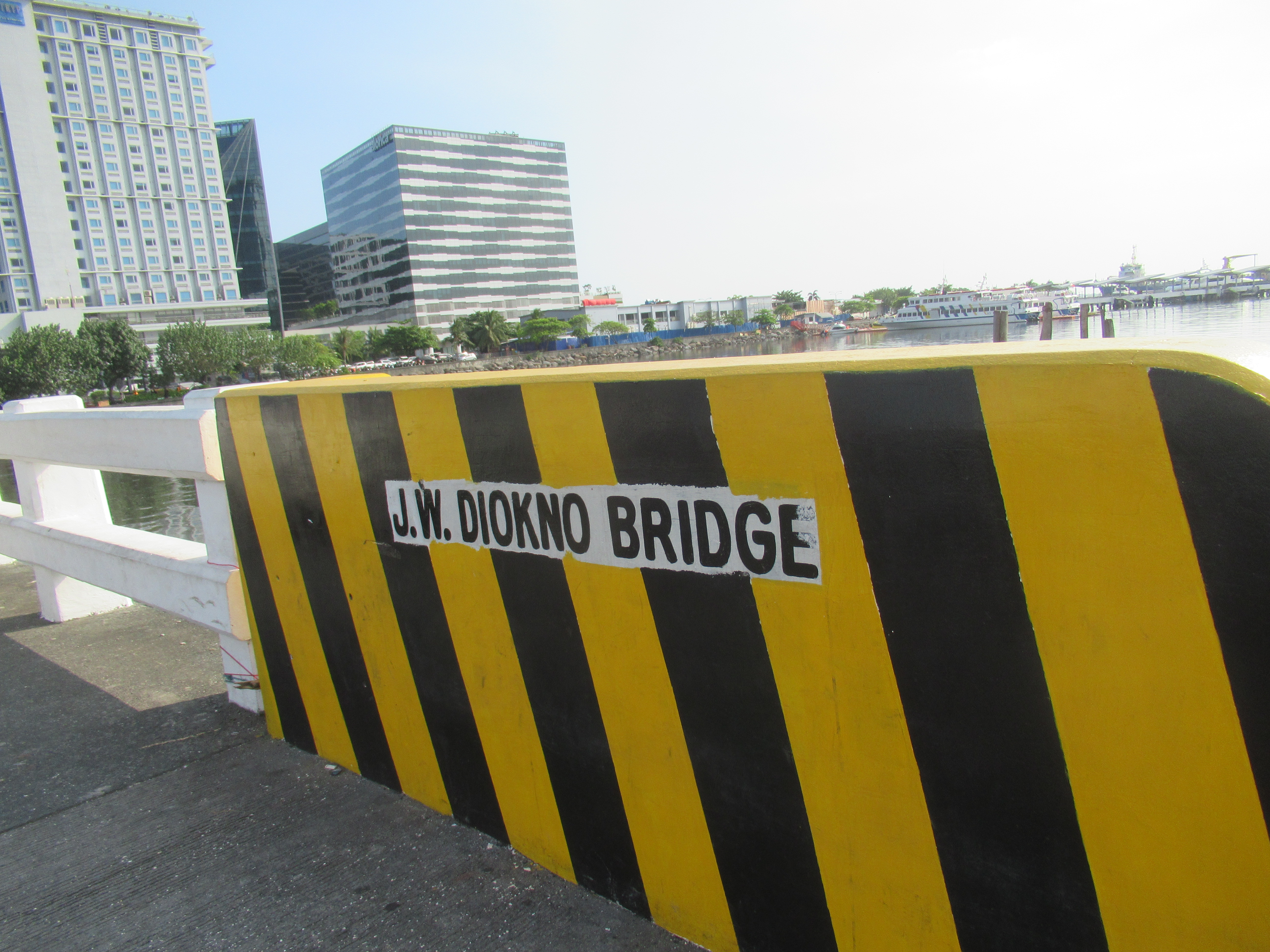
Jose W. Diokno Bridge in Pasay City

Following Diokno's passing, President Cory Aquino declared March 2–12, 1987 as a period of national mourning, with flags flown at half-staff. Expressing her grief, Aquino said, "Pepe braved the Marcos dictatorship with a dignified and eloquent courage our country will long remember." She quoted what her husband Ninoy would often tell his friends that Diokno was "the one man he would unquestioningly follow to the ends of the earth," and that he was "the most brilliant Filipino." As part of KAAKBAY's group of intellectuals, UP Professor Randy David admired Diokno and called him the "best president we did not have," while London's Amnesty International called him the "champion of justice and human rights in Asia." Diokno became famous in the United Kingdom after creating a martial law documentary called "To Sing Our Own Song" with the British Broadcasting Corporation in 1982. Out of frustration, Marcos subpoenaed Diokno and interviewee Cardinal Sin to testify before the Supreme Court regarding their roles in the documentary and connection with another involved human rights hero named Horacio Morales, who used the documentary as trial evidence against the military. Marcos even threatened the British embassy and gave them an order to cancel the documentary, which the British decidedly ignored.

Diokno's nationalist legacy made further headlines when on February 12, 1983, former Supreme Court Justice J.B.L. Reyes, UP President Salvador P. Lopez, and former senators Tañada and Diokno formed the Anti-Bases Coalition (ABC), with Diokno voted as the secretary general or the chairman of the coalition. The influence of the ABC eventually led to the end of American military presence in the Philippines, notably in Subic Bay and Clark, Pampanga. The historic turnover ceremony transpired on November 24, 1992, under then-Philippine President Fidel Ramos. Diokno also had a reputation for philanthropy as one of the Board of Directors at the Philippine Tuberculosis Society, Inc. (PTSI).

In 2004, Diokno was posthumously conferred the Order of Lakandula with the rank of Supremo—the Philippines' highest honor, which was signed by former Pres. Diosdado Macapagal's daughter, the 14th president Gloria Macapagal Arroyo. Diokno was the first recipient of this honor. The award tends to be reserved for non-Filipinos, making Diokno unique in that distinction. By virtue of a presidential proclamation signed by Gloria Arroyo, February 27 is perennially celebrated in the country as Jose W. Diokno Day.

In 2005, the De La Salle Professional Schools, Inc. Graduate School of Business (DLS-PSI-GSB) handed out the inaugural "Ka Pepe Diokno Human Rights Award" as a champion of human rights. This was established along with another milestone, the establishment of the Jose W. Diokno Distinguished Professorial Chair in Business Law and Human Rights. The first ever Ka Pepe Diokno award as a Champion of Human Rights was given to Voltaire Y. Rosales, Executive Judge of Tanauan, Batangas for his effort in protecting the downtrodden, even giving up his life for the cause. Subsequent annual awards have been given to worthy candidates such as Maria Ressa and Bishop Pablo Virgilio "Ambo" David, who in life or death, fulfilled the values of protecting human rights just as Senator Diokno did. He has received praise in other sectors, as Rappler has called him the "country's greatest lawyer." DLSU has also created other memorials such as the annual Jose W. Diokno Memorial Lecture series held at the University of St. La Salle in Bacolod City since 1992, and the Senator Jose W. Diokno Leadership Award at DLSU in Malate, Manila. Diokno also received a Doctor of Laws Honoris Causa from the UP College of Law.

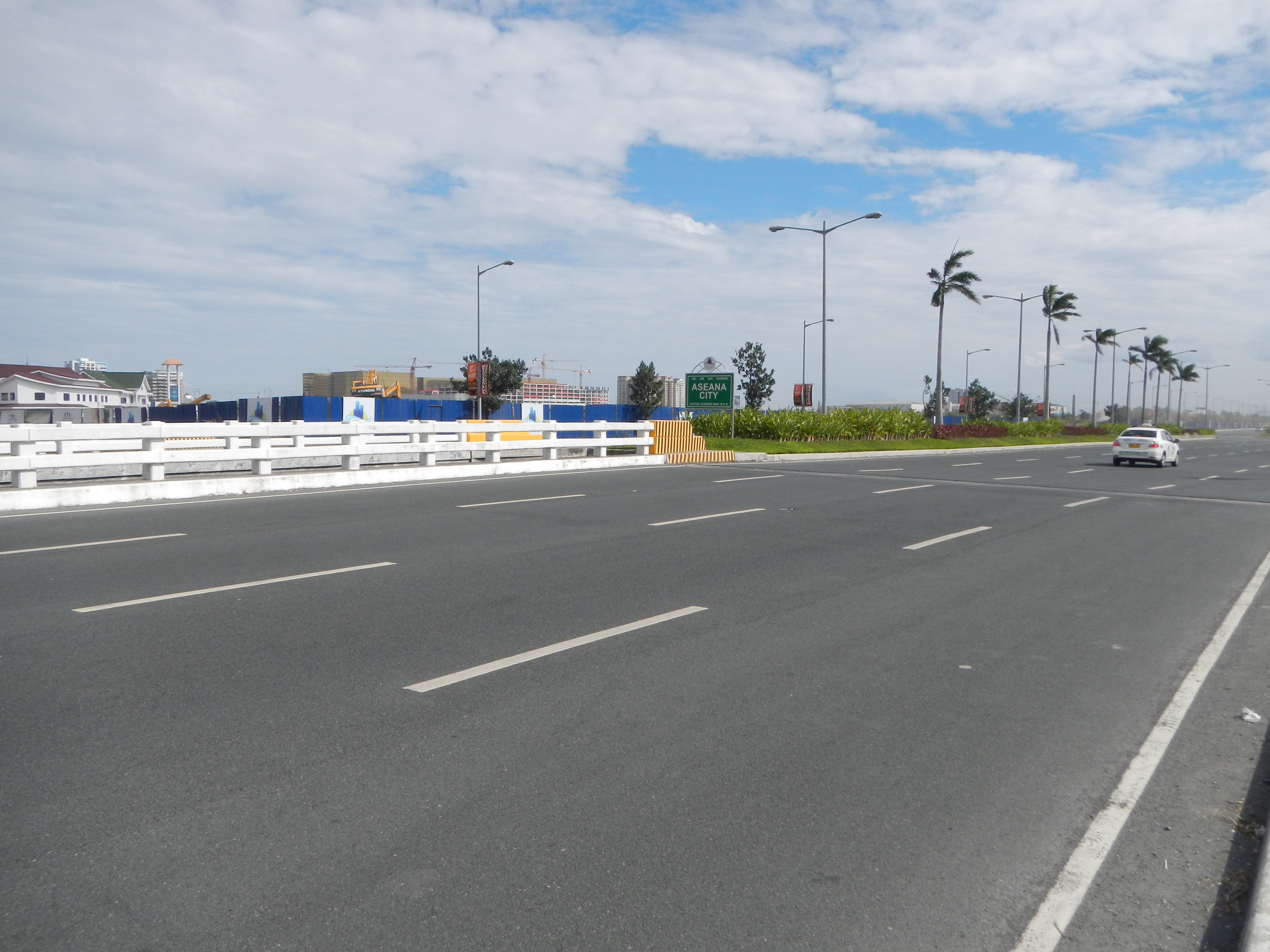
J.W. Diokno Boulevard along the Bay City coastline

In 2007, by virtue of RA 9468, Bay Boulevard, a 4.38 km road along the Bay City coastline, or Pasay and Parañaque City was renamed Jose W. Diokno Boulevard in his honor. Calle Jose W. Diokno in Taal Heritage Town was also renamed after the nationalist, and stretches more than 420 m intersecting Calle Ananías Diokno, which was named after his grandfather. The municipality houses the ancestral home of the family of Ananías Diokno and was heavily used as Diokno's political residence when running for the Senate and voting in the elections in the 1960s. Taal later named its inaugurated legislative hall the Jose W. Diokno Legislative Hall for the Sangguniang Bayan to conduct its regular sessions. The project was planned by Taal mayor Pong Mercado and all the barangay captains in the municipality. The town, among other areas, was celebrating the centennial of Diokno's birth.

In 2017, the CHR erected a nine-foot statue of Diokno at the center of the CHR compound entrance in Diliman, Quezon City. The statue was made by sculptor Julie Lluch. The surrounding park was named Liwasang Diokno or the Diokno Freedom Park. The hall inside the compound is called Bulwagang Ka Pepe or Bulwagang Diokno (the Ka Pepe or Diokno Hall) and features a bust and an accompanying mural of the late chairman.

=== National Honors ===
- Order of Lakandula (Supremo) - posthumous (2004)

== Personal life and descendants ==
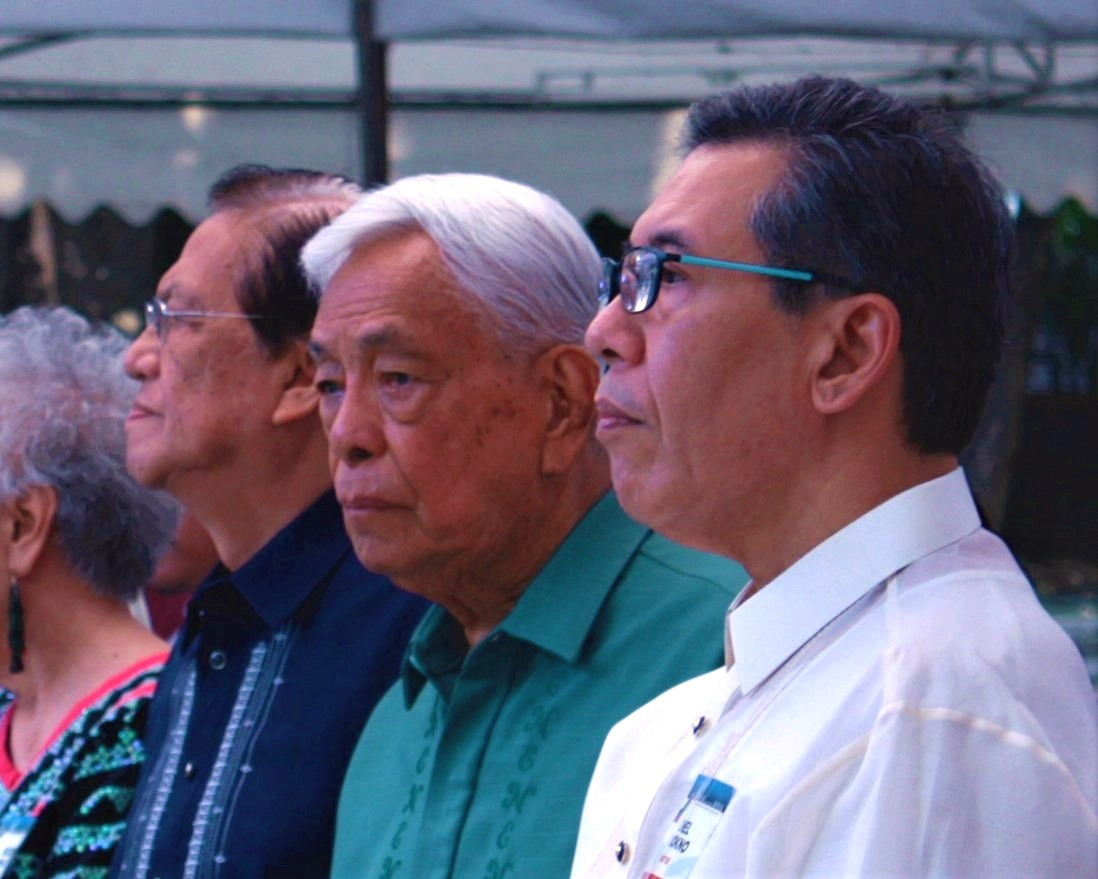
Chel Diokno seen honoring heroes at the Bantayog ng mga Bayani

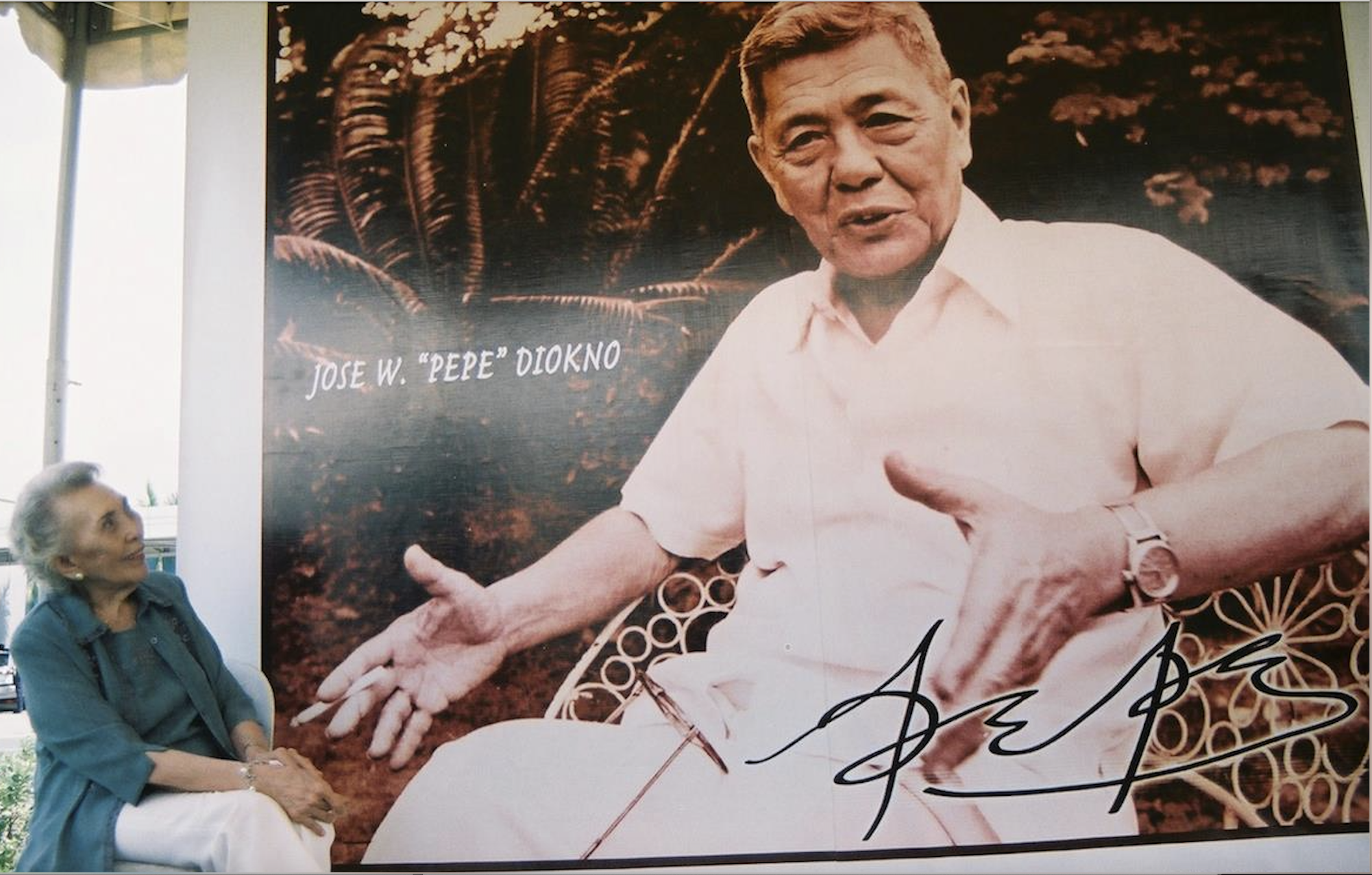
Carmen Diokno

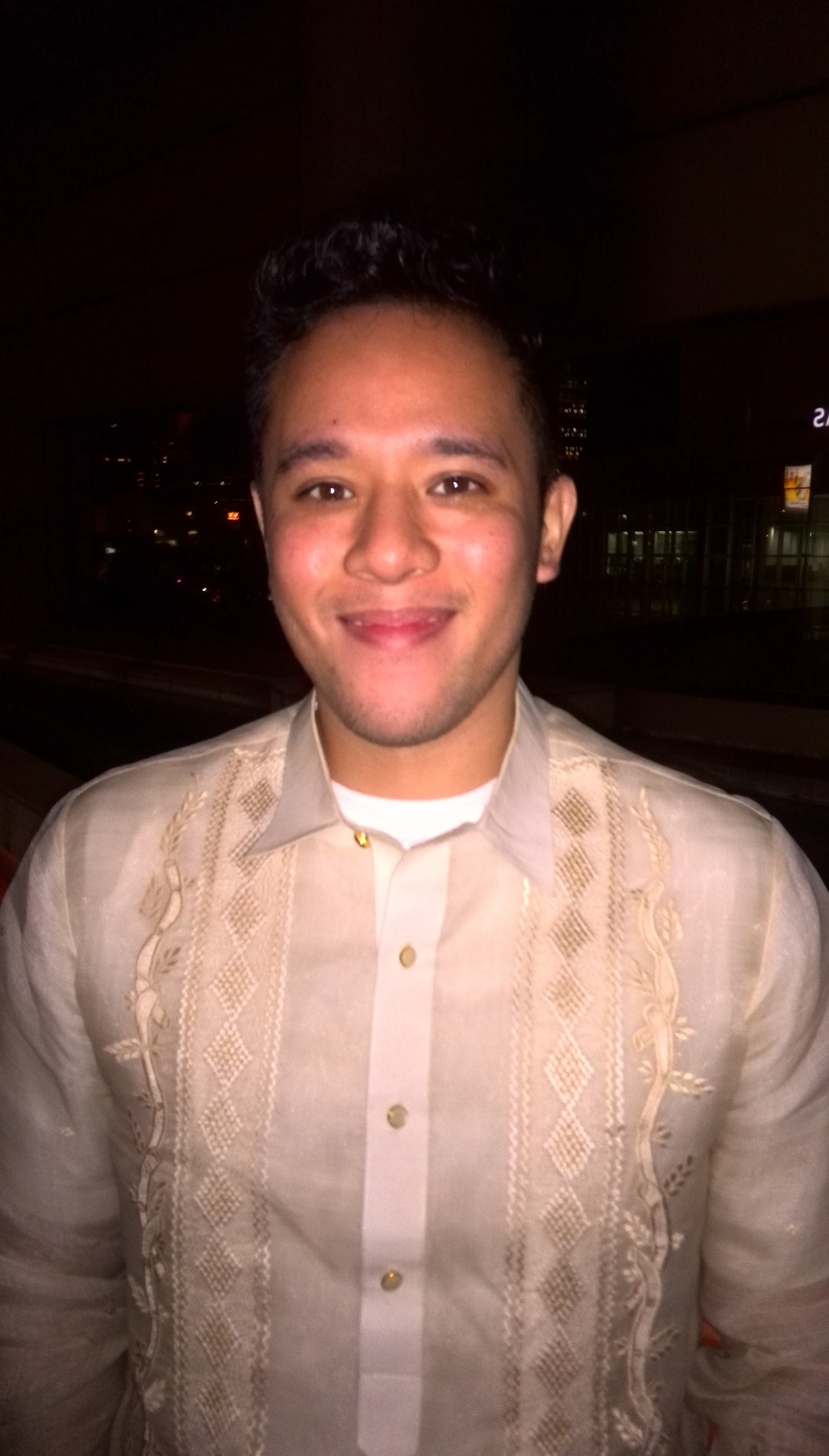
Grandson Pepe Diokno

Sen. Diokno was married to Carmen "Nena" Reyes Icasiano on March 28, 1949, at Ermita Church, with whom he had ten (10) children mostly named after St. Jude Thaddeus, the saint of lost causes: Carmen Leonor or Mench, who was born a year after the marriage and became college valedictorian, then first joined the garment industry with husband Emil Escay before working for NGOs; Jose Ramon or Popoy, who joined the Lopez Group of Companies that established the ABS-CBN Corporation; Maria Paz Tadea or Pat, who joined banking companies in Europe and domestically such as ComBank; Maria Serena Encarnacion or Maris, who is a nationally recognized historian; Maria Teresa Tadea or Maitet, who is a UP cum laude graduate of Economics and was executive director of a non-profit institution called IBON Foundation; Ma. Socorro Tadea or Cookie, who was secretary general of the Regional Council on Human Rights in Asia and secretary general at FLAG since 1976; Jose Miguel Tadeo or Mike, who is a US-based lawyer; Jose Manuel Tadeo or Chel, who is a dean and lawyer; Maria Victoria Tadea or Maia, also a lawyer and her father's CHR secretary; and Martin Jose Tadeo, who is a Singapore-based architect from UST and was adopted when he was two weeks old. Diokno also has at least 18 grandchildren and 11 great-grandchildren. His children all excelled in their studies, but Diokno would often chide his children about their lack of perfect scores, to which Maris would reply that studying in schools like the American-founded UP (which is the official public national university and where Sen. Diokno wished to enroll in but was banned by his politically-moderate parents) made very good scores the equivalent to perfect scores at DLSU, a private, sectarian Catholic university. They were quite devout, as they frequently had nightly rosary prayers and were devotees of St. Joseph and St. Thaddeus, with Diokno often carrying a rosary in his pocket, which he practiced since his elementary days at De La Salle College.

Maris Diokno, a renowned historian, is the former chair of the National Historical Commission of the Philippines, and former Vice President for Academic Affairs at UP. She studied at the University of London and graduated UP magna cum laude.

Chel Diokno is a human rights lawyer, Chairman of FLAG, head of the Diokno Law Center and member of the Jose W. Diokno Foundation, founding Dean of the DLSU Tañada-Diokno School of Law, and former Special Counsel of the Senate Blue Ribbon Committee. Chel Diokno ran for Senator twice and nearly secured enough votes to obtain a seat. He joined the Otso Diretso coalition and Leni Robredo's coalition, which opposed the Rodrigo Duterte administration. Chel ran for the House seat under the Akbayan partylist. Duterte has been compared to the Marcos family without the privileged background or American ties of Marcos, but instead he has been seen currying favor with the Chinese Communist Party. Duterte has also committed human rights violations and like Marcos shut down the media corporation of ABS-CBN. FLAG has represented Rappler founder Maria Ressa, during court hearings filed against her by the Duterte administration for Rappler's reports on Duterte's War on Drugs and Murder of Drug Addicts.

Sen. Diokno's grandson and Chel's firstborn child, Jose Lorenzo "Pepe" Diokno is the executive director of alternative education group Rock Ed Philippines. He is best known as a motion picture director, producer, and screenwriter whose debut film, "Engkwentro" won the Venice Film Festival's Lion of the Future Award in 2009, as well as Venice's Orizzonti Prize, the NETPAC Award for Best Asian Film, and the Gawad Urian for Best Editing. Pepe used commercials and short films to market his father Chel during his election campaigns. Pepe Diokno is also the director of Kwentong Jollibee and other commercials that have gained popularity among netizens.

== Public image ==
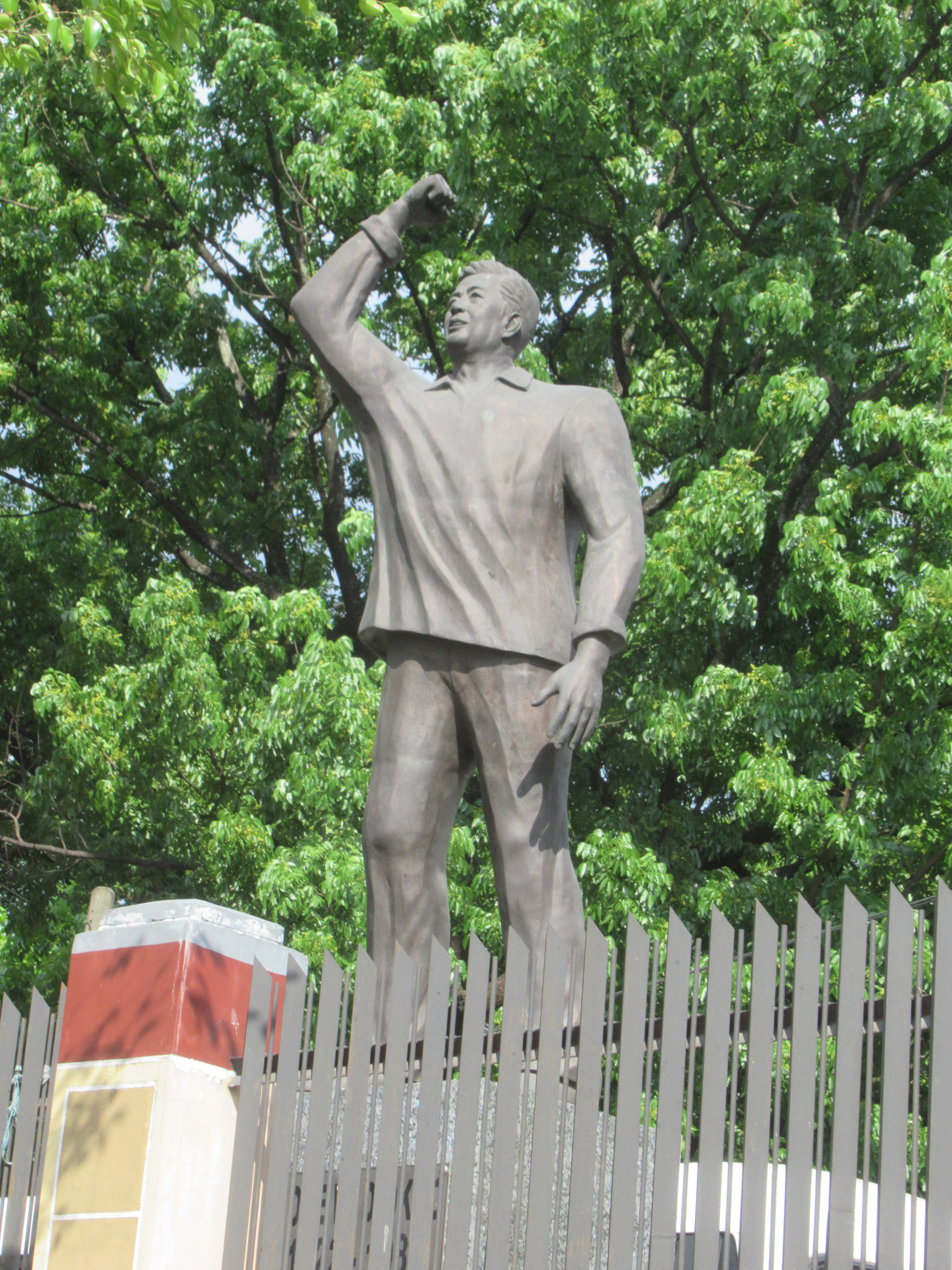
Liwasang Diokno (freedom park)

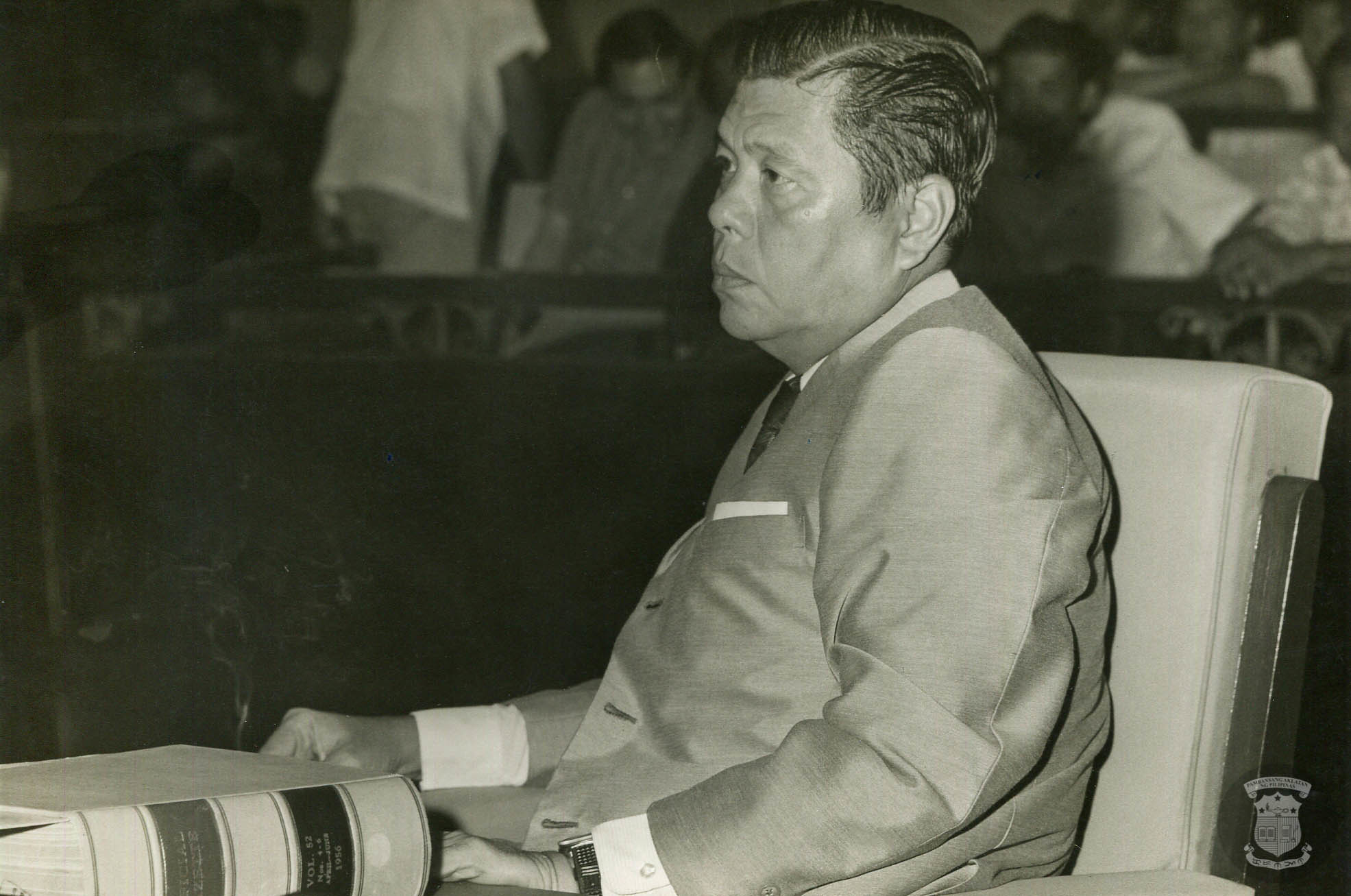
Diokno at a hearing

Diokno is generally seen as the intellectual leader contrasted to the fierceness of Ninoy Aquino in opposing the perversion of the Marcos Administration. He managed to have the ability to lead rival political factions together. As senator, Diokno had a strong relationship with technocrats such as Cesar E.A. Virata, Placido Mapa Jr., and Vicente Paterno, all of whom joined Marcos's administration during martial law. According to these economists and technocrats, Diokno did not carry preconceived notions of others provided that nationalist goals could be met. His willingness to work with people of contrasting ideologies allowed him to adopt the Investment Incentives Act of 1967. Diokno was also popular among all social classes and became a liaison between Pres. Aquino's new government and the communists, whom he led in different coalitions in the past. Despite Diokno's seemingly stoic demeanor and very simple lifestyle, Diokno was also known to be quite eloquent and was completely blunt with his opinions, as he usually avoided any sugarcoating. One instance was when he addressed an affluent American audience at the Westchester Country Club in New York:

"Let us do it as we believe it must be done, not as you would do it in our place. Let us make our mistakes, not suffer yours… With your help or despite your hindrance, Philippine nationalism will do the job. No one else can."

The audience fell completely silent after his address.

Diokno is described to have been well-respected by his peers, and he carried the same stature as other talented and brilliant scholar-activists in history, including Jose Rizal and Apolinario Mabini.

=== Publications and Speeches ===
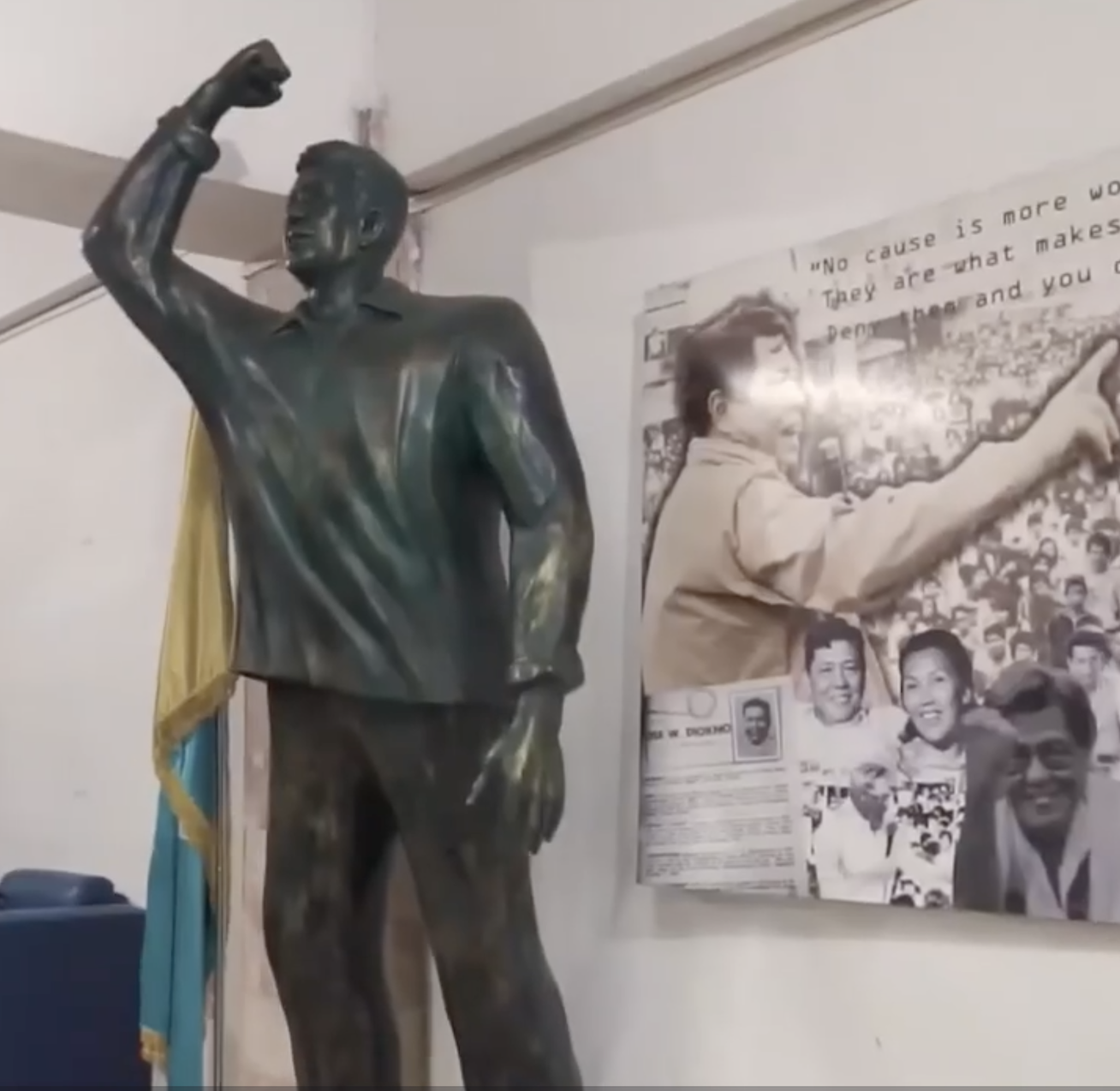
Diokno statue at the Bulwagang Ka Pepe, CHR Central Office

Among his works are Diokno on Trial: Techniques and Ideals of the Filipino Lawyer - the Complete Guide to Handling a Case in Court, which was compiled and posthumously published by the Diokno Law Center in 2007. During martial law he also produced multiple pamphlets with FLAG and as an activist. Some of these include The State of the Nation After Three Years of Martial Law.

A Nation for Our Children, a collection of Jose W. Diokno's essays and speeches on human rights, nationalism, and Philippine sovereignty, was published in 1987 by the Diokno Foundation. The collection is named after Diokno's popular speech, in which he says,

There is one dream that all Filipinos share: that our children may have a better life than we have had. So there is one vision that is distinctly Filipino: the vision to make this country, our country, a nation for our children.

In his BBC Documentary To Sing Our Own Song, Diokno lamented the foreign US aid given to the paramilitary of the Marcos dictatorship. He still concluded the film with a sense of renewed hope:

How can such a government stay in power? Because powerful nations, principally the United States, support it. And they support it because of my country's strategic location and the profits that their multinationals make here. It looks impossible for my people and people of the Third World to get out of this trap. But we will. It would be a lot easier if you of the First World were to give us your sympathy and your understanding, and prevail upon your governments to stop supporting repressive governments like the one in my country. But whether your governments do or not, I know my people, I know other Third World people. I've worked with them. I've lived among them. And whatever your governments do, whatever our own elites and our own rulers do, and even if we have to wade through blood and fire, we will be free, we will develop. We will build our own societies. We will sing our own songs.

== Electoral history ==
Electoral history of Jose W. Diokno
Year	Office	Party	Votes received				Result
Year	Office	Party	Total	%	P.	Swing	Result
1963	Senator of the Philippines	Nacionalista	3,422,828	44.38	3rd	—N/a	Won
1969	Senator of the Philippines	Nacionalista	4,566,353	55.67	3rd	—N/a	Won

== Ancestry ==
Ancestors of Jose W. Diokno

8. Ángel Diokno
4. Ananías Diokno
18. Juan Noblejas
9. María Andrea Noblejas y Sauza
19. Restituta María del Carmen Sauza y Berenguer de Marquina
2. Ramón Diokno
5. Paulina Marasigan
1. Jose W. Diokno
6. Roberto Wright
3. Leonor Wright
7. Irene Garcia

== Bibliography ==
- Alfreðsson, Guðmundur S. (1995). On the Eve of Dictatorship and Revolution. Martinus Nijhoff Publishers. ISBN 978-9-041-10094-8.
- Celoza, Albert F. (1997). Ferdinand Marcos and the Philippines: The Political Economy of Authoritarianism. Greenwood Publishing Group. ISBN 9780275941376.
- Daroy, Petronilo Bn. (1988). On the Eve of Dictatorship and Revolution. Conspectus Foundation.
- Diokno, Jose Manuel I. (2020). The Model Pleadings of Jose W. Diokno. Quezon City: Diokno Law Center.
- Diokno, Jose Manuel I. (2007). Diokno on Trial: Techniques and Ideals of the Filipino Lawyer : the Complete Guide to Handling a Case in Court. University of Michigan: Diokno Law Center. ISBN 978-9719378709.
- Garcia, Ed (1993). Six Modern Filipino Heroes. Pasig, Metro Manila: Anvil Publishing. ISBN 978-9-712-70325-6.
- George, T.J.S. (1980). Terrorism and Violence in Southeast Asia: Transnational Challenges to States and Regional Stability. Oxford University Press. ISBN 978-0-195-80429-4.
- Kahl, Colin H. (2008). States, Scarcity, and Civil Strife in the Developing World. Princeton University: Princeton University Press. ISBN 9780691138350.
- Manalang, Priscila S. (1987). A Nation for Our Children: Selected Writings of Jose W. Diokno. Quezon City: Jose W. Diokno Foundation. ISBN 978-9-719-10880-1.
- Mijares, Primitivo (2017). The Conjugal Dictatorship of Ferdinand and Imelda Marcos. Quezon City: Ateneo de Manila University Press. ISBN 978-9715507813.
- Republic of the Philippines Congressional Record: Senate, Volume 4. California: Bureau of Print. 1965.
- Smith, Paul J. (2004). Revolt in Mindanao: The Rise of Islam in Philippine Politics. M.E. Sharpe. ISBN 978-1-317-45886-9.

Legal offices
Preceded by Alejo Mabanag	Secretary of Justice; January 2, 1962–May 19, 1962	Succeeded by Juan Liwag
Political offices
New office	Chairman of the Presidential Committee on Human Rights; March 18, 1986–January 23, 1987	Succeeded by Mary Concepcion Bautista as Chairperson of the Commission on Human Rights
