= Pepe Diokno (director) =

Filipino film director

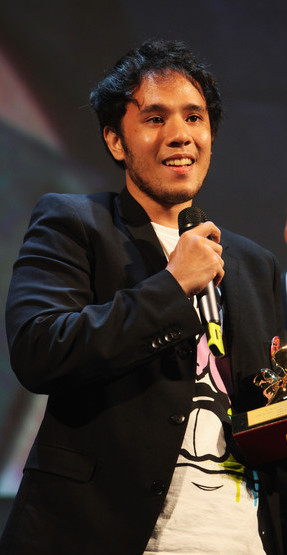
- Diokno at the Venice Film Festival, September 2009
- Born: Jose Lorenzo Aromin Diokno III; August 13, 1987 (age 38); Manila, Philippines
- Education: University of the Philippines Diliman
- Occupations: Film director; producer; screenwriter
- Years active: 2009–present
- Partner: Royd Santiago
- Parent(s): Chel Diokno; Divina Aromin
- Relatives: List: Maris Diokno (aunt); Ramón Diokno (great-grandfather); Ananías Diokno (great-great-grandfather); Félix Berenguer de Marquina (ancestor); Francis Garchitorena (distant relative)
- Website: pepediokno.com

Jose Lorenzo "Pepe" Aromin Diokno III (born August 13, 1987) is a Filipino film director, producer, and screenwriter. He received the Lion of the Future Award for Best Debut Film and the Orizzonti Prize at the 2009 Venice Film Festival, and was awarded Best Director at the 2023 Metro Manila Film Festival.

== Early life and career ==
Diokno was born in Manila, the eldest of six children to lawyer Chel Diokno and writer Divina Aromin.

Diokno attended La Salle Green Hills for grade school and high school. He then pursued a bachelor's degree in Film and Audio-Visual Communication at the University of the Philippines - College of Mass Communication.

In 2006, Diokno made the short film "No Passport Needed", which was selected for the Cinemalaya Independent Film Festival. In 2008, he made the short documentary "Dancing For Discipline," which allowed him to visit jails and detention facilities across the Philippines. It was at one such facility in Davao City that he met two brothers who inspired his first feature film.

== Career ==
=== Film ===
In 2009, Diokno made his debut feature, Engkwentro. The film premiered at the 2009 Cinemalaya Independent Film Festival. It then had its international premiere at the Venice Film Festival, where it received two awards — the Lion of the Future - "Luigi de Laurentiis" Award, and the Orizzonti Prize. In 2020, the film was selected for the Locarno Film Festival Open Doors Screenings, where it received a Special Mention.

Diokno's second feature, Above the Clouds, was produced with the support of France's Aide aux cinemas du monde, South Korea's Asian Cinema Fund, Switzerland's Visions Sud Est, and the Arte Prize from the 2012 Berlinale Talent Project Market. The film premiered at the Tokyo International Film Festival and was selected for the Singapore International Film Festival.

In 2015, Diokno directed his third feature, the experimental film Kapatiran, with a grant from the QCinema International Film Festival. The film had its international premiere, out of competition, at the Karlovy Vary International Film Festival.

In 2023, Diokno directed and co-wrote the historical drama GomBurZa, which premiered at the 2023 Metro Manila Film Festival, where it received seven awards, including Best Director. The film, which was produced by Jescom Films and MQuest Ventures, was a critical and commercial success, spending over five weeks in cinemas, and debuting at number one on Netflix.

=== Other projects ===
Outside of film, Diokno works in advertising, and has made short films and commercials with companies such as Jollibee, P&G, Unilever, Mondelez, Nestlé, and others. His works, such as the Kwentong Jollibee series, the Maggi Kusinaserye series, and the Safeguard film Pabaon sa Buhay, have set viral video records and won international advertising awards.

During the COVID-19 crisis in 2020, Diokno produced a series of pro-bono commercials for the Department of Health to raise awareness about the virus among Filipinos with no access to the Internet.

=== Production companies ===
In 2011, Diokno co-founded the independent production company Epicmedia, along with producer Bianca Balbuena. The company has since produced Lav Diaz’s Berlin Silver Bear winner, Hele sa Hiwagang Hapis, and the box office hit That Thing Called Tadhana by Antoinette Jadaone.

In 2016, Diokno joined film and advertising production company UxS.

In 2024, Diokno set-up his own film and series development company, Kapitol Films.

== Filmography ==
| Year | Title | Festivals | Awards |
|---|---|---|---|
| 2009 | Engkwentro | 66th Venice Film Festival 2009; 50th Thessaloniki International Film Festival 2009; 39th International Film Festival Rotterdam 2010; 11th Jeonju International Film Festival 2010; 50th Vienna International Film Festival 2010; 5th Cinemalaya Independent Film Festival 2009 | Lion of the Future - "Luigi de Laurentiis" Award for Debut Film, Venice Film Festival; Orizzonti Prize - Best Picture, Venice Film Festival; Best Asian Film, Network for the Promotion of Asian Cinema Prize, Jeonju International Film Festival; Best Editing, Gawad Urian Awards |
| 2014 | Above the Clouds | 27th Tokyo International Film Festival 2014; 25th Singapore International Film Festival 2014 | |
| 2015 | Kapatiran | 3rd QCinema International Film Festival 2015; 52nd Karlovy Vary International Film Festival 2016 | |
| 2023 | GomBurZa | 49th Metro Manila Film Festival 2023 | 2nd Best Picture; Best Director; Best Actor - Cedrick Juan; Best Cinematography - Carlo Mendoza; Best Production Design - Ericson Navarro; Best Sound - Melvin Rivera and Louie Boy Bauson |
| 2024 | Isang Himala | 50th Metro Manila Film Festival 2024 | 4th Best Picture; Special Jury Prize; Best Supporting Actress - Kakki Teodoro; Best Original Theme Song - "Ang Himala Ay Nasa Puso" by Juan Karlos; Best Musical Score - Vincent de Jesus |

== Ancestry ==
Diokno was named after his grandfather, the late Philippine senator Jose W. "Ka Pepe" Diokno.

His great-great-grandfather, Gen. Ananías Diokno, led the Visayan forces during the 1896 Philippine Revolution and the Philippine-American War.

Ancestors of Pepe Diokno

16. Ananías Diokno
8. Ramón Diokno
17. Paulina Maracigan
4. Jose W. Diokno
18. Roberto Wright
9. Leonor Wright
19. Irene Garcia
2. Chel Diokno
20. Alipio Bello Ycasiano
10. Abelardo Icasiano
21. Ysmaela Reyes
5. Carmen Icasiano
22. Francisco Reyes
11. Carmen Reyes
23. Macaria Baptista
1. Pepe Diokno
3. Divina Aromin
