= Ananías Diokno =

Filipino Military Officer

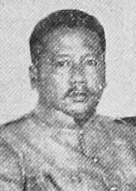
- Born: Ananías Diokno y Noblejas; January 22, 1860; Taal, Batangas, Captaincy General of the Philippines
- Died: November 2, 1922 (aged 62); Arayat, Pampanga, Philippine Islands
- Military career
- Allegiance: First Philippine Republic
- Branch: Philippine Revolutionary Army
- Service years: 1895–1901
- Rank: General of Visayas
- Conflicts: Philippine Revolution; Philippine–American War

Ananías Diokno y Noblejas (January 22, 1860 – November 2, 1922) was reputedly the only Philippine Revolutionary Army general to lead a full-scale military expedition to the Visayas against the Spanish forces. Also known as General of the Seas, his successful landing in Bicol and the Visayas were considered one of the first missions of the Philippine Navy. He is the father of nationalist Supreme Court Justice and Sen. Ramón Diokno, and the grandfather of Sen. Jose W. Diokno, the intellectual leader of the opposition against the Marcos administration and the father of human rights. Diokno is also the great-grandfather of human rights lawyer and professor Jose Manuel "Chel" Diokno.

== Early life ==
He was born in Taal, Batangas, Philippines on January 22, 1860, to Ángel Diokno and María Andrea Noblejas y Sauza. There are no records regarding his boyhood and early career.

== Philippine Revolution ==
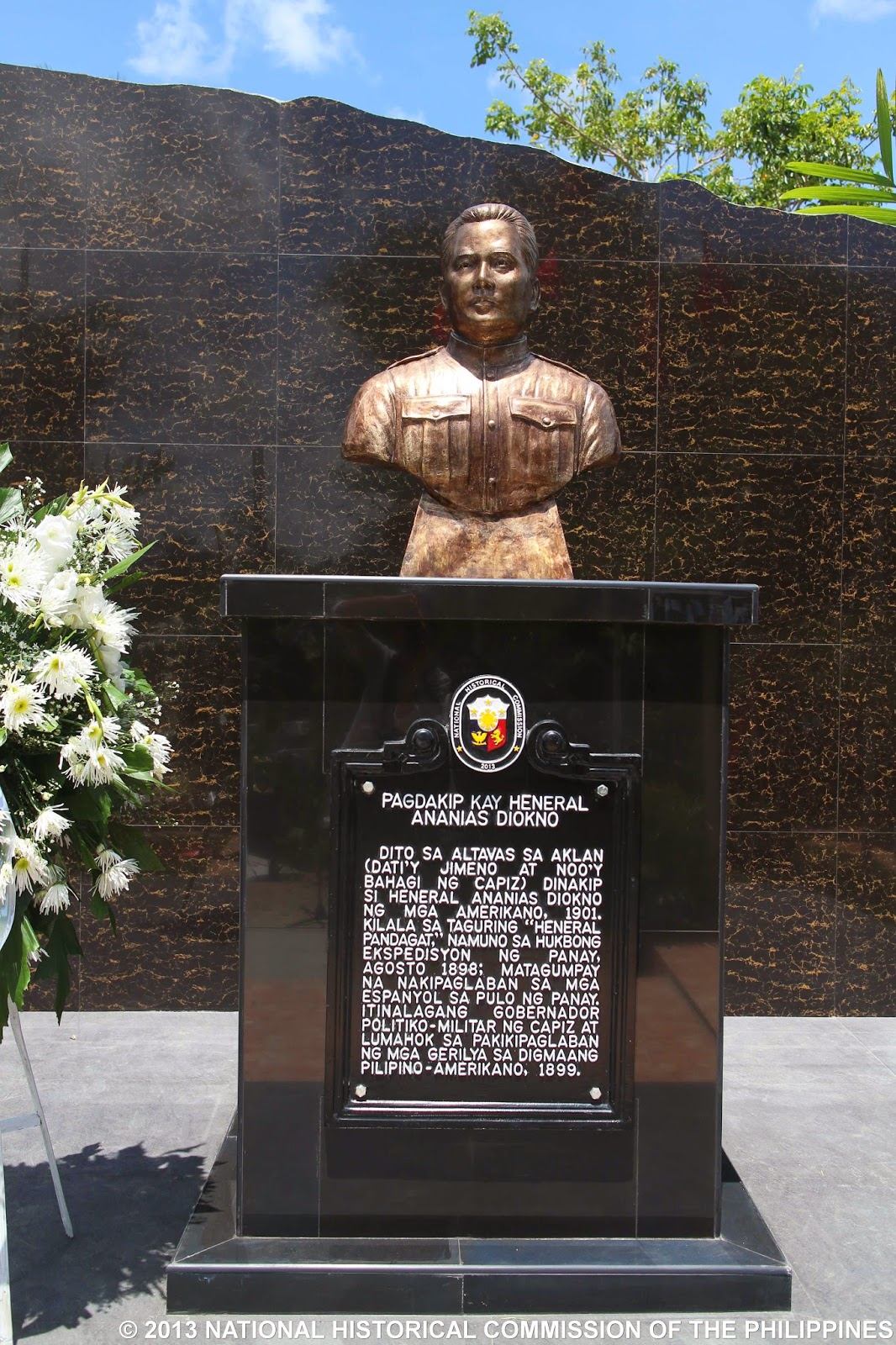
Bust of Gen. Diokno from the National Historical Commission

In 1895, Diokno, along with his Taaleño friend Felipe Agoncillo, were prosecuted by civil and ecclesiastical authorities for obstruction of functions of the government as revolutionaries. On August 29, 1896, Don Fernando Parga y Torriero, military governor of Cavite, had Diokno and other revolutionaries arrested and brought to immediate trial. Prominent citizens who fled to Indang, Cavite established the Regional Government of Batangas with Miguel Malvar as commanding general and Diokno as secretary of war.

At the resumption of the revolution after the Pact of Biak-na-Bato, he was commissioned by the Central Revolutionary Government of Emilio Aguinaldo to lead an expedition to Visayas to attack the Spanish stronghold there and to forge a cooperative stance between the Visayan rebel forces. The Battalion Malaya was organized, a force made up of 750 men divided into six companies, and a battery consisting of two cannons. He was made commanding general of the battalion. He and his forces first went to Mindoro, then to Marinduque, and to the Bicol region to organize local revolutionary governments in the area and facilitated elections. Juan Miranda was elected president and Second Lieutenant Jose Karingal was left to organize collection of taxes. He and his forces were aboard three of the five initial vessels under the control of Aguinaldo's government, Taaleño, Bulusan and Purisima Concepcion, which were actually captured or donated Spanish ships converted into gunboats with 8 or 9 cm guns.

In August 1898, the Spanish rule in Capiz under Governor Juan Herrero quickly surrendered to Diokno. Aguinaldo, upon recommendation of Apolinario Mabini, appointed Diokno civil and military governor of Cápiz. Later, he received the immediate surrender of Spanish forces in Panay. Strong Spanish remnant presence in Samar, however, caused Diokno to retreat.

== Philippine–American War ==
Many rebels saw Diokno, governor of Capiz under the Aguinaldo government, as an incoming contending leader in Visayan government and opined that orders should come from Roque Lopez as president of the Republic of Visayas. This, with incoming American forces occupying every Visayan island it passed through, caused Diokno to retreat to the mountains of Capiz and conduct guerrilla warfare against the new colonizer. On March 18, 1901, Captain Peter Murray of the 18th US Infantry and First Lieutenant Frank Bolles of the 6th US Infantry, with corresponding detachments, located and ambushed Diokno's forces at Barrio Dalipdan, Capiz. Diokno was wounded and imprisoned, with two of his men killed in action.

== Later life ==
In 1916, he was offered to be Director of Agriculture under the administration of Francis Burton Harrison but he refused. He died at his farm in Pampanga on November 2, 1922, eight months and a week after the birth of his grandson Jose W. Diokno.

== Ancestry ==
The great-great grandfather of Ananías Diokno is Felix Berenguer de Marquina y Fitzgerald, the governor-general and namesake of Marikina City. Because of the Irish ancestry of Berenguer de Marquina in the noble Fitzgerald clan, he descends from Norman French or English, and European nobles such as Saint Begga of Belgium, who is Diokno's ancestor by forty-four degrees. St. Begga is the great-great grandmother of King Charlemagne and daughter-in-law to St. Arnulf of Metz, France. Diokno through the Fitzgerald clan also descends from William Boleyn, who is the grandfather of Elizabeth I of England, making the English queen a cousin of Diokno's English ancestor. Berenguer de Marquina had an illegitimate Chinese mestiza daughter from Cagsawa, Albay who married a Spanish-Mexican public servant surnamed Sauza, whose daughter eventually moved north and settled in Taal, Batangas marrying a member of the Tagalog Noblejas clan. Their daughter María Andrea Noblejas y Sauza, who descended from Berenguer de Marquina, became part of the Diokno family by marrying Ángel Diokno. Because of the Fitzgerald clan, the line at least starting Ananías Diokno y Noblejas can trace its roots to nobles, public servants, soldiers, and saints from the first century A.D.

Ancestors of Ananías Diokno

2. Ángel Diokno
1. Ananías Diokno
6. Juan Noblejas
3. María Andrea Noblejas y Sauza
28. El Rico Sauza y Sanchez
14. Santiago Sauza y de los Ríos
29. María Purísima Presentación de los Ríos y Cortés
7. Restituta María del Carmen Sauza y Berenguer de Marquina
30. Félix Berenguer de Marquina
15. Isabel Berenguer de Marquina y Sumulong
31. Demetria Sumulong y Lindo
