= SOGIE Equality Bill =

Sexual Orientation and Gender Identity Expression bill, in the Philippines Congress

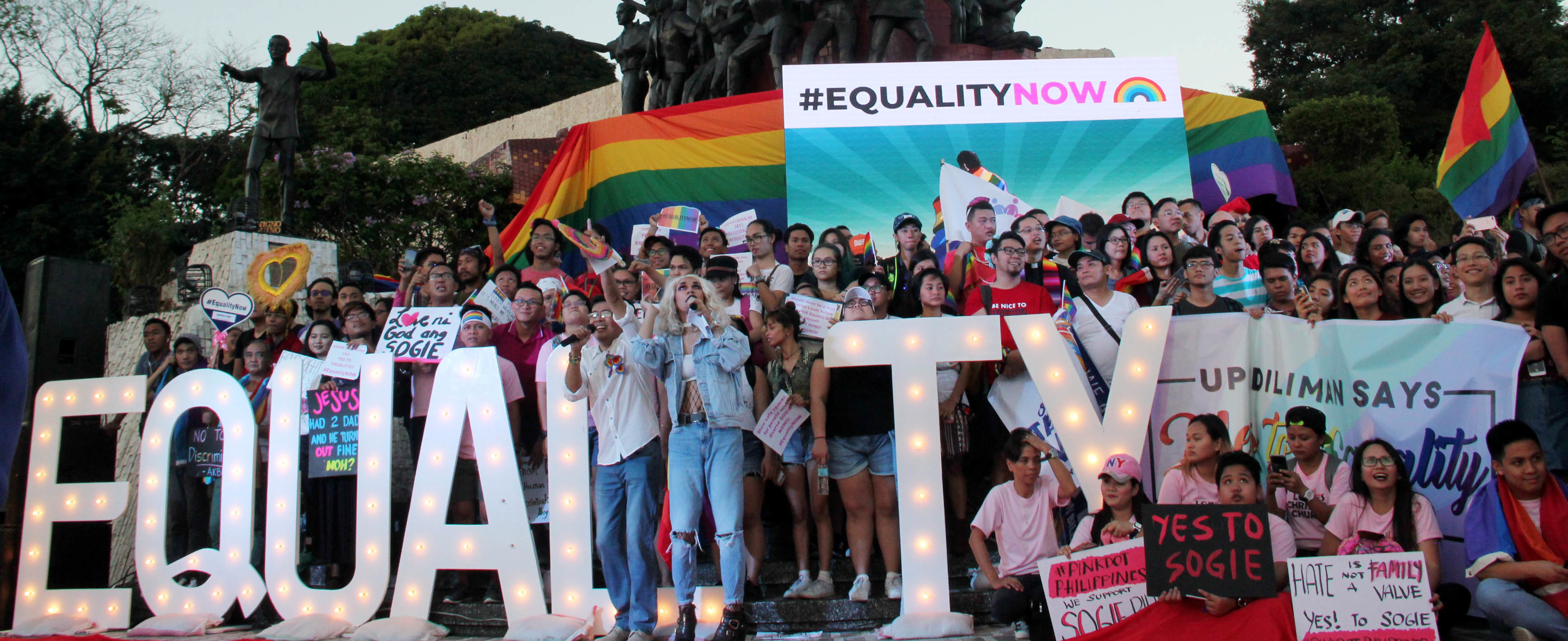
2018 rally at the EDSA People Power Monument to support the passage of the SOGIE Equality Bill

The Sexual Orientation and Gender Identity Expression (SOGIE, /ˈsoʊdʒiː/ Tagalog: [ˈsɔdʒi]) Equality Bill, also known as the Anti-Discrimination Bill (ADB), the SOGIESC-Based Anti-Discrimination Bill, or simply the SOGIESC Bill, is a series of House and Senate bills that were introduced in the 17th, 18th, 19th, and 20th Congress of the Philippines, which aims to set into law measures to prevent various economic and public accommodation-related acts of discrimination against people based on their sexual orientation, gender identity, or expression. The first anti-discrimination bill based on SOGIE was first introduced in the 14th Congress of the Philippines, and has since been refiled continuously up to the present Congress.

== Past legislation history ==
=== Prior to the 17th Congress ===
A senate bill against discrimination on the basis of sexual orientation and gender identity was believed to have been first filed under the 11th Congress of the Philippines in 2000 by then-Senator Miriam Defensor-Santiago. On July 26, 2004, under the 13th Congress of the Philippines, Senator Defensor-Santiago filed the Employment Non-Discrimination bill which aims to prohibit employment discrimination on the basis of sexual orientation. Similar bills were refiled by her on the 14th (Anti-Discrimination bill of 2007) and 15th congress (Anti-Sexual Orientation Discrimination bill).

In the House of Representatives, counterpart house bills were filed continuously by the representatives of Akbayan party-list starting with House Bill 634 filed during the 13th Congress of the Philippines on July 1, 2004, by then party-list Representative Etta Rosales, together with fellow Akbayan Representatives Mario Aguja and Risa Hontiveros. In the 13th Congress of the Philippines, it was refiled by Akbayan representatives Risa Hontiveros and Walden Bello. In the 14th Congress of the Philippines, it was refiled by Akbayan representatives Walden Bello and Kaka Bag-ao, and with Bello and Barry Gutierrez by the 15th Congress of the Philippines. In the 16th Congress of the Philippines, it was refiled by Akbayan representative Tom Villarin.

Similar measures continued to be filed by other senators during the 13th to 16th Congress but none have been successful. Example provided below are the first anti-discrimination senate bills from their respective congress:

- 13th Congress - Senate Bill 165 (Employment Non-Discrimination bill of 2004)
- 14th Congress - Senate Bill 11 (Anti-Gender Discrimination bill)
- 15th Congress - Senate Bill 1559 (Anti-Sexual Orientation Discrimination bill)
- 16th Congress - Senate Bill 1022 (Anti-Discrimination bill)

=== 17th Congress ===
In 2017, the first SOGIE house bill of the 17th Congress was filed by Dinagat Islands Representative Arlene Bag-ao under House Bill 51. Similar bills were filed by Bataan Representative Geraldine Roman (HB 267), Akbayan Representative Tomas Villarin (HB 3555), and other representatives. These bills were consolidated and substituted by House Bill 4982. HB 4982 made history when it was approved on the third and final reading with no members of the House of Representatives in opposition, becoming the first Anti-Discrimination Bill that was approved in the House of Representatives.

The counterpart bill in the Senate, filed by Senator Risa Hontiveros (the first Akbayan senator), was in the period of interpolations by May 2018. It was backed by Senators Loren Legarda, Grace Poe, Nancy Binay, Franklin Drilon, Bam Aquino, Chiz Escudero, Ralph Recto, Sonny Angara, JV Ejercito, Kiko Pangilinan, Migz Zubiri, and Leila de Lima, although de Lima was barred from voting on the bill as she was then in police custody. It was opposed by Senators Tito Sotto, Manny Pacquiao, Cynthia Villar, and Joel Villanueva (who signed up as a co-author of the bill). Other senators such as Win Gatchalian, Koko Pimentel, Antonio Trillanes, Panfilo Lacson, and Richard J. Gordon did not express their support or rejection of the bill. Additionally, Alan Peter Cayetano and Gregorio Honasan lost their voting rights on Senate measures as they joined the presidential cabinet. Out of the existing 24 Senate seats: 12 seats could vote and were in support of the bill, 1 seat was in support but could not vote on the bill, 4 seats could vote and were in opposition to the bill, 5 seats could vote on the bill but have not yet given their positions on it, and 2 seats were de facto vacated. For a bill to have passed the Senate, it needed more than half the votes in favor of it from all 24 Senate seats. The SOGIE Equality Bill was supported by 12 seats that were allowed to vote on the measure.

The bill is also supported by the Catholic student governments of University of the Philippines-Diliman (UPD), Ateneo de Manila University (ADMU), De La Salle University (DLSU)-Manila, De La Salle - College of St. Benilde (CSB), Far Eastern University (FEU), Miriam College (MC), St. Scholastica's College (SSC)-Manila and San Beda University (SBU). The longest running LGBT student organization, UP Babaylan, has also been supporting the bill ever since it was first filed, as well as known celebrities and icons such as Heart Evangelista, Nadine Lustre, Bianca Gonzalez, Iza Calzado, Charo Santos-Concio, Dingdong Dantes, Joey Mead King, Divine Lee, Karen Davila, Chot Reyes, Tootsy Angara, BJ Pascual, Samantha Lee, Christine Bersola-Babao, Rajo Laurel, Tim Yap, Anne Curtis, Mari Jasmine, Laureen Uy, Pia Wurtzbach, Lorenzo Tañada III, Vice Ganda, Arnold Van Opstal, and Chel Diokno.

In March 2018, a small group of Christians protested at the Senate against the SOGIE bill by calling the proposed legislation an "abomination", adding that homosexuality is a "sin" according to the Bible and that identifying as part of the LGBT community is a lifestyle. The group also claimed that the bill relates to same-sex marriage, which is not found anywhere within the bill. Senators Villanueva, Gatchalian, and Villar spoke against same-sex marriage after the protest. In May 2018, Senator Tito Sotto, who opposes the SOGIE bill, became the new Senate President. In an interview, Sotto was asked on the bill's passage, to which he responded, "Not in this congress."

In July 2018, various high-profile celebrities rallied for the passage of the SOGIE bill. They also called out senators Sotto, Pacquiao, and Villanueva to end the debates and pass the proposed legislation. In August 2018, at the height of the bill's postponed debates, various discrimination incidents against the Filipino LGBT community surfaced, causing public calling for the passage of the SOGIE Equality Bill in the Senate. Numerous influential personalities, including political allies of the three senators who oppose the bill, sided with the calls to pass the landmark proposal.

In May 2019, the SOGIE Equality Bill officially became the longest-running bill under the Senate interpellation period in Philippine history. Supporters of the bill have remarked that the prolonged interpellation was intended by the dissenters to block the passage of the historic anti-discrimination bill. The bill's principal author and sponsor in the Senate, Senator Risa Hontiveros, called on her Senate colleagues to formally close the question period so that the bill can be open for amendments and voting. In June 2019, with the end of the session of the 17th Congress, the SOGIE Equality Bill died after the lawmakers failed to tackle the bill in this session of the Senate of the Philippines. The Senate version of the bill was first filed on August 11, 2016. It was sponsored by Risa Hontiveros on December 14 of the same year. The bill has become one of the slowest-moving bills in the country's history. The passed House version of the bill would have penalised discrimination with a fine of not less than ₱100,000 but not more than ₱500,000, or imprisonment of not less than one year but not more than six years or both, depending on the court's decision. However, she said the bill had gained new allies and wider acceptance among policy makers and the public and that she is confident the bill will pass in the next Congress. The bill was archived, and the bill must be refiled in the 18th Congress, restarting the one to three-year process of enactment.

=== 18th Congress ===
Versions of the SOGIE Equality Bill were refiled in the 18th Congress by Senators Risa Hontiveros, Leila de Lima, Kiko Pangilinan, and Imee Marcos although she is against divorce and same sex marriage stating that it is "too complicated". Another similar bill was filed by Senator Sonny Angara. Senators Bong Go, Migz Zubiri, Ralph Recto, and Franklin Drilon announced their support for the SOGIE Bill. In the House of Representatives, various representatives also filed their versions of the bill, notably, Sol Aragones of Laguna, Geraldine Roman of Bataan, Loren Legarda of Antique, Maria Lourdes Alba of Bukidnon, Joy Belmonte of Quezon City, Bayan Muna representatives Eufemia Cullamat, Carlos Zarate, and Ferdinand Gaite, Kristine Singson of Ilocos Sur, Bagong Henerasyon representative Bernadette Dy, Eric Olivarez of Parañaque, and Francis Abaya of Cavite. Representatives Sy-Alvarado, De Venecia, Reyes, Taduran, Bordado, Olivarez, and Violago also signed as co-author of the bill filed by representative Roman, while Gabriela Women's Party representative Arlene Brosas signed as co-author of the bill filed by Bayan Muna.

Religious leaders also gave their support for the SOGIE Bill, such as Koko Alviar of the Iglesia Filipina Independiente (Aglipayan Church), Sister Mary John Mananzan, OSB, executive director of the Institute of Women's Studies of the Catholic St. Scholastica's College, Bishop Solito Toquiero of the National Council of Churches in the Philippines, and Pastor Kakay Pamaran of the Union Theological Seminary. In contrast, representative Eddie Villanueva claimed that the SOGIE Bill is 'imported' and not part of Filipino culture.

Senate president Tito Sotto expressed dissent against the bill again, adding that the bill "will not pass" in the Senate as long as he is the Senate president. Senator Joel Villanueva also expressed dissent. President Rodrigo Duterte withdrew his support of the bill, and began attacking the bill's proponents, such as Congresswoman Geraldine Roman.

Various personalities announced their support for the SOGIE Bill, namely: Anne Curtis, Heart Evangelista, Catriona Gray, Pia Wurtzbach, Judy Taguiwalo, Iza Calzado, Nadine Lustre, Janine Gutierrez, BJ Pascual, Mari Jasmine, and Samantha Lee. Vice President Leni Robredo also supported the SOGIE Bill, while President Rodrigo Duterte supported "an anti-discrimination law patterned like the one approved in Davao". The government has stated that they will not certify an anti-discrimination bill as "urgent". In September 2020, groups again called to pass the SOGIE bill after President Duterte gave an absolute pardon to a former US Marine who has been convicted of homicide in relation to the killing of trans Filipina Jennifer Laude.

=== 19th Congress ===
The SOGIE Equality bill was refiled in the 19th Congress by Senators Risa Hontiveros, Loren Legarda, and Mark Villar in September 2022 with Senator Robin Padilla showing support for the bill. The bill passed the Senate committee on women, children, family relations, and gender equality in December 2022 with the support of 19 senators. Included in the signatories of the Senate committee report were Hontiveros, Senate president pro tempore Legarda, and Senate minority leader Koko Pimentel.

In November 2022, under the orders of the administration of then-allies President Bongbong Marcos and Vice President Sara Duterte, the Philippine delegation to the country's 4th cycle of the Universal Periodic Review at the United Nations outright rejected several recommendations, including the passage of the Sexual Orientation, Gender Identity and Expression (SOGIE) Equality Bill.

Senator Joel Villanueva and his father, Rep. Eddie Villanueva in the lower house of Congress, were accused of using underhanded tactics to delay or block discussions on the bill, after leaks about their attempts were made known to the public.

In the House of Representatives, the consolidated Sexual Orientation, Gender Identity, Gender Expression, or Sex Characteristics bill passed the committee on women and gender equality in May 2023.

The Commission on Human Rights expressed support for the bill and stated that its passage complies with the Philippines' obligations to international human rights. Musician and former National Youth Commission chair Ice Seguerra has also expressed support for the bill.

In February 2023, senator Joel Villanueva, in a bid to block the SOGIE Bill, moved to revert the proposed legislation to the committee level he personally controlled, using some alleged letters from far-right religious groups who were against the SOGIE Bill as his primary reason. The move was highly criticized by the bill's sponsor, senator Risa Hontiveros, who stated that the Senate leadership previously assured her of their support for the bill's progress. On the same month, Rappler published an investigative report about an anti-SOGIE disinformation network wherein the online network had been spreading disinformation about the bill since 2019.

In early June 2023, senator Joel Villanueva, in continuation of his attempts to block the debates on the SOGIE Bill, publicly announced that the bill, which has been snatched to his committee under his order back in February, was "not urgent", stating that he will not prioritize its passage. Senator Risa Hontiveros criticized Villanueva, calling his words as "sheer numbness". In protest to the bill's stagnation, two pride month events were held in June 2023 with the one held in Quezon City garnering an attendance of over 110,000 people and dubbed by the organizers as the "Largest Pride March in Southeast Asia". Various pride marches also occurred in key cities throughout the country's regions from Baguio City, Davao City, Iloilo City, Naga City, Angeles City, Cebu City, Cagayan de Oro City, and many more.

In June 2024, over 200 organizations under The Equality Alliance signed an open letter urging President Marcos to certify the SOGIE equality bill as urgent. The proposed measure has been languishing in Congress for over two decades. However, President Marcos chose not to certify the bill and did not mention the plight of the LGBT community in his State of the Nation Address in July 2024.

In June 2025, during the pride month celebrations, former Vice President Leni Robredo again called for the passage of the SOGIESC Bill.

== Current efforts ==
The SOGIE Equality bill is refiled in the 20th Congress by Senators Risa Hontiveros and Loren Legarda in July 2025. In the House, their version was filed by Akbayan representatives Chel Diokno, Perci Cendaña, and Dadah Kiram Ismula, as well as Mamamayang Liberal (ML) representative Leila de Lima.

In the House of Representatives, the consolidated Sexual Orientation, Gender Identity, Gender Expression, or Sex Characteristics bill passed the Committee on Women and Gender Equality on November 11, 2026.

== See also ==
- Bakla
- LGBTQ rights in the Philippines
