= Chel Diokno =

Filipino lawyer and politician

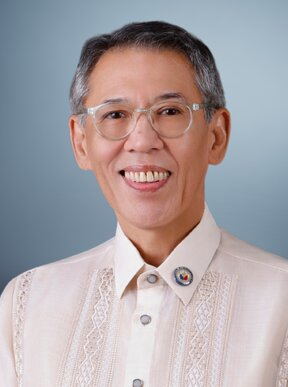
- Official portrait, 2026

Member of the Philippine House of Representatives for Akbayan
- Incumbent
- Assumed office June 30, 2025 Serving with Perci Cendaña and Dadah Kiram Ismula

Assistant Minority Floor Leader
- Incumbent
- Assumed office July 30, 2025
- Leader: Marcelino Libanan
Legal and academic roles held
Dean of the De La Salle University College of Law
In office 2009–2019
Preceded by	Position established
Succeeded by	Gil de los Reyes
Chairman of the Bantayog ng mga Bayani Foundation
Incumbent
Assumed office August 30, 2022
Preceded by	Wigberto Tañada
Chairman of the Free Legal Assistance Group
In office 2003–2025
Succeeded by	Theodore Te

Personal details
- Born: Jose Manuel Tadeo Icasiano Diokno; February 23, 1961 (age 65) Pasay, Rizal, Philippines
- Party: Akbayan (2024–present)
- Other political affiliations: KANP (2021–2024); Independent (2021); Liberal (2018–2021)
- Spouse: Divina Aromin
- Relations: Diokno family
- Children: 6, including Pepe
- Parent(s): Carmen Diokno (mother); Jose W. Diokno (father)
- Education: University of the Philippines Diliman (BA); Northern Illinois University (JD)
- Occupation: Lawyer, educator, academic administrator, politician, radio host
- Profession: Lawyer
- Website: Official website

Jose Manuel Tadeo "Chel" Icasiano Diokno (Tagalog: [ˈdʒɔknɔ], born February 23, 1961) is a Filipino politician and lawyer who has served as a representative for Akbayan Party-list since 2025.

Diokno is the son of former Senator Jose W. Diokno. He studied law at the University of the Philippines College of Law and Northern Illinois University in the United States, graduating in 1986 and passing the Philippine Bar Examinations in 1988. For much of his legal career, Diokno has been affiliated with the Free Legal Assistance Group, a nationwide organization of human rights lawyers. He became its chairman in 2003 and held the role until 2025. In 2009, he founded the Tañada-Diokno School of Law as the De La Salle University College of Law and served as its inaugural dean until 2019. In 2022, he became the chairman of the Bantayog ng mga Bayani Foundation.

Diokno unsuccessfully sought election to the Senate of the Philippines twice, running in 2019 under Otso Diretso and 2022 under Team Robredo–Pangilinan. He was elected to the House of Representatives in 2025 as the first nominee of Akbayan, which won three seats in an upset victory.

== Early life and education ==
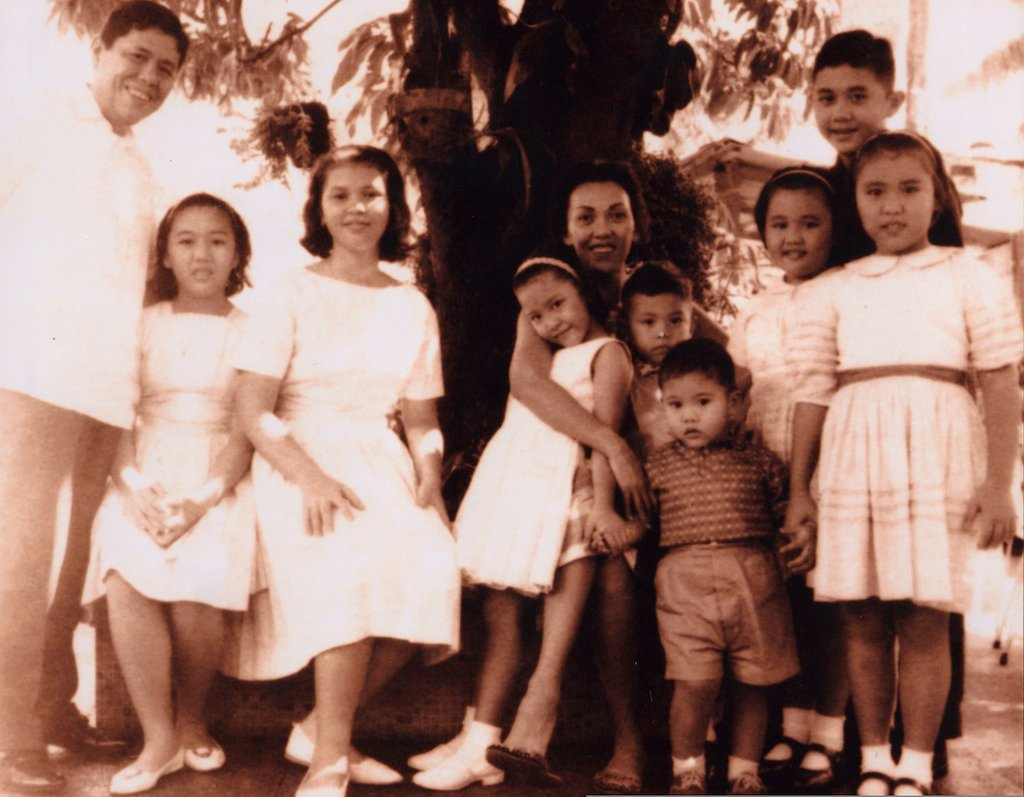
Chel Diokno, front row, the eighth child

Jose Manuel Tadeo Icasiano Diokno was born on February 23, 1961, in Pasay, Rizal. He was the eighth of ten children to human rights lawyer Jose W. Diokno, who later served as a senator, and activist Carmen Icasiano. He is the great-grandson of Ananías Diokno, a leader of the Visayans during the Philippine–American War, and the grandson of Ramón Diokno, a nationalist who served as Senator and Supreme Court Associate Justice. His sister, Maris Diokno, went on to serve as a senior administrator in the University of the Philippines system and chairperson of the National Historical Commission of the Philippines (NHCP).

Diokno completed his elementary and secondary education at La Salle Green Hills in Mandaluyong. As a student, he was the student council leader and a member of the varsity basketball team. He developed an interest in cycling and aikido, where he earned a black belt.

In 1982, Diokno earned a Bachelor of Arts degree in philosophy from the University of the Philippines Diliman. He studied law at the University of the Philippines College of Law for one year before transferring to Northern Illinois University (NIU) in the United States, where he graduated magna cum laude with a Juris Doctor in 1986. He passed the bar examination in Illinois in 1987. After his father's death, he returned to the Philippines and passed the Philippine Bar Examination in 1988, beginning his law practice the following year.

== Legal career ==
Diokno returned to the Philippines in 1987 and has regularly served as an amicus curiae in the Supreme Court. In the 1990s, Diokno served in the Commission on Human Rights under Presidents Corazon Aquino and Fidel V. Ramos. He was also a member of the Committee on Human Rights and Due Process at the Integrated Bar of the Philippines (IBP). He has also served as a special counsel for the Senate Blue Ribbon Committee.

Diokno was part of the team of lawyers affiliated with the Free Legal Assistance Group (FLAG) who prosecuted the 27 police officers implicated in the 1995 Kuratong Baleleng rubout case.

In 2001, Diokno was the private prosecutor in the impeachment proceedings against then-President Joseph Estrada. That same year, he became General Counsel of the Senate Blue Ribbon Committee (the Committee on Accountability of Public Officers and Investigation) under Senator Joker Arroyo. In 2004, he was appointed Special Counsel at the Development Bank of the Philippines.

=== Chairmanship of the Free Legal Assistance Group ===
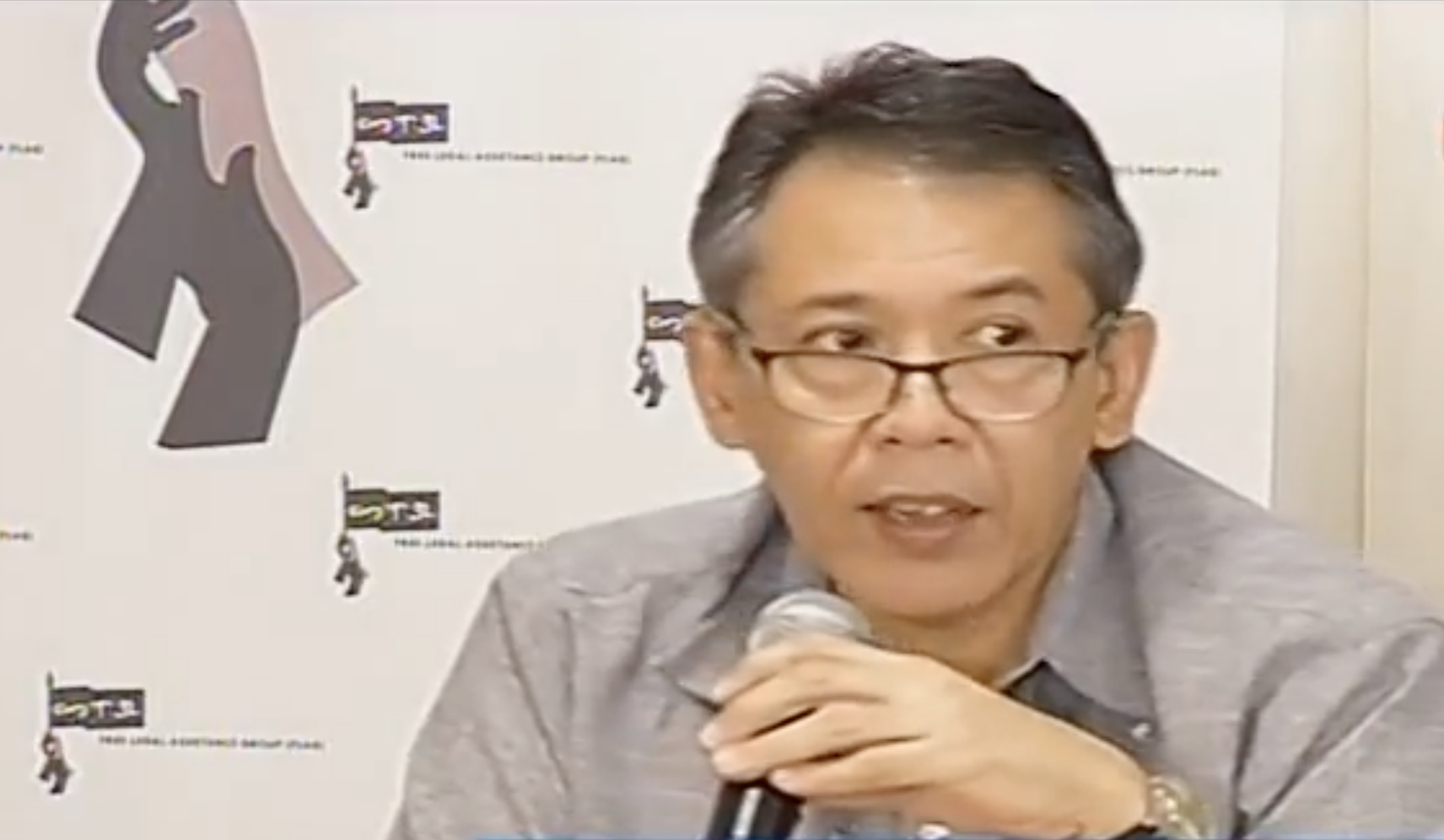
Diokno during a Free Legal Assistance Group (FLAG) conference in 2017

Diokno became the chairman of the Free Legal Assistance Group (FLAG) in 2003.

In the NBN–ZTE deal corruption scandal, he served as the counsel for Jun Lozada, the whistleblower and lead witness in the Ombudsman's cases against former National Economic and Development Authority (NEDA) head Romulo Neri and former Commission on Elections (Comelec) chair Benjamin Abalos.

In 2007, he, along with fellow FLAG lawyers Theodore Te and Ricardo Sunga III, petitioned and were granted by the Supreme Court to issue Writs of Amparo for Raymond and Reynaldo Manalo, two brothers who were allegedly tortured by military agents. In 2008, he secured the release of the "Tagaytay 5," who were allegedly illegally detained by the Philippine National Police.

Together with Te, Diokno represented several media organizations in a petition against the Arroyo administration in 2018. The case involved members of ABS-CBN, the Philippine Daily Inquirer, Probe Productions, Newsbreak, and the Philippine Center for Investigative Journalism, among others, who were allegedly rounded up for their "illegal" coverage of the Manila Peninsula siege. In 2019, Diokno served as the lead lawyer, alongside Te, for Rappler CEO and founder Maria Ressa against the Duterte administration. One case he handled was People of the Philippines v. Santos, Ressa and Rappler.

Following the resignation of Ombudsman Merceditas Gutierrez, Diokno was named as a candidate for the position, which ultimately went to then-Associate Justice Conchita Carpio-Morales.

Until 2019, Diokno served as the Presidential Adviser on Human Rights at the IBP and was a member of the Panel of Arbitrators at the International Centre for Settlement of Investment Disputes.

== Academic career ==
Diokno taught at Far Eastern University during its collaboration with De La Salle University and at the Ateneo de Manila University from 2003 to 2010. In 2006, Diokno established the Diokno Law Center, which provides legal training to various government agencies. In 2007, Diokno published the book Diokno on Trial, which would be considered a staple in trial courses.

In 2009, Diokno founded the De La Salle University College of Law and served as its founding dean until 2019. On August 21, 2022, he was named the chairman of the Bantayog ng mga Bayani Foundation.

== Philippine Senate campaigns ==
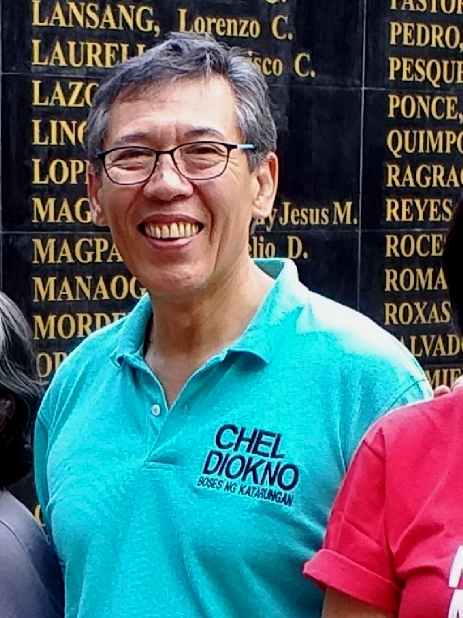
Chel Diokno at the Bantayog ng mga Bayani in 2019

=== 2019 ===
In the 2019 Philippine general election, Diokno ran for a seat in the Senate as a member of the Liberal Party under the Otso Diretso coalition, which opposed President Rodrigo Duterte's human rights record. His senatorial bid received endorsements from former associate justices Antonio Nachura and Roberto A. Abad as well as former Ombudsmen Conchita Carpio-Morales and Simeon V. Marcelo.

He was defeated, placing 21st in the official results (only the top 12 win a seat). On July 19, 2019, the PNP–Criminal Investigation and Detection Group (CIDG) filed charges against Diokno and other opposition members for "sedition, cyber libel, libel, estafa, harboring a criminal, and obstruction of justice." These charges were related to the "Bikoy" videos. On February 10, 2020, he was cleared of all charges.

=== 2022 ===
On June 12, 2021, ahead of the 2022 Philippine presidential election, 1Sambayan—a coalition that aimed to field a single candidate against President Duterte's preferred successor—endorsed Diokno and five others for president and vice president. He declined to run for either position, stating that while he was honored by the nomination, he preferred continuing his Free Legal Helpdesk and other forms of service.

On September 15, 2021, Diokno announced his candidacy for the Senate in the 2022 Philippine Senate election. While he initially planned to run as an independent, he filed his certificate of candidacy for the position as a member of the Katipunan ng Nagkakaisang Pilipino (KANP) on October 7. During the campaign, he ran under Team Robredo–Pangilinan in support of the presidential bid of Vice President Leni Robredo. He was also listed as a guest candidate in the senatorial slate of her opponent Leody de Guzman. Diokno went on to be defeated again, placing 19th in the official results.

== House of Representatives (since 2025) ==
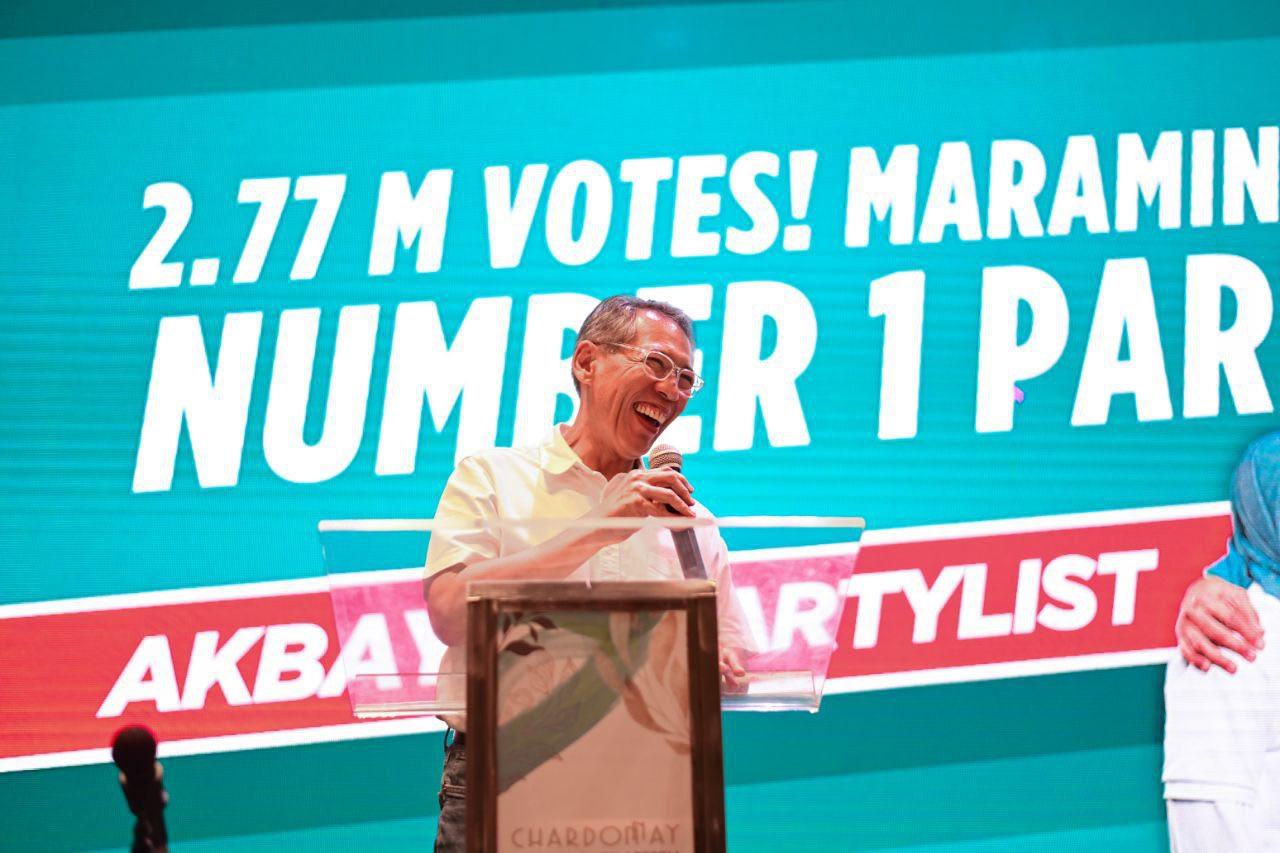
Diokno at a thanksgiving celebration following Akbayan's victory in the 2025 election.

=== Election ===
On May 14, 2024, Diokno announced his intention to run for the Senate for a third time in the 2025 elections. He would backtrack from his initial plans upon becoming a member of Akbayan later in the year. The party later announced that they nominated Diokno as their first nominee for the 2025 Philippine House of Representatives elections.

Leading up to the election, pollsters including Pulse Asia projected Akbayan to be at risk of losing its sole seat in the lower house. The party went on to top the party-list election with 2,779,621 votes, securing three seats in the 20th Congress for Diokno, incumbent Representative Perci Cendaña, and Dadah Kiram Ismula. Media outlets regarded the results as an upset victory for the party, with Diokno himself expressing shock at the results.

=== Tenure ===
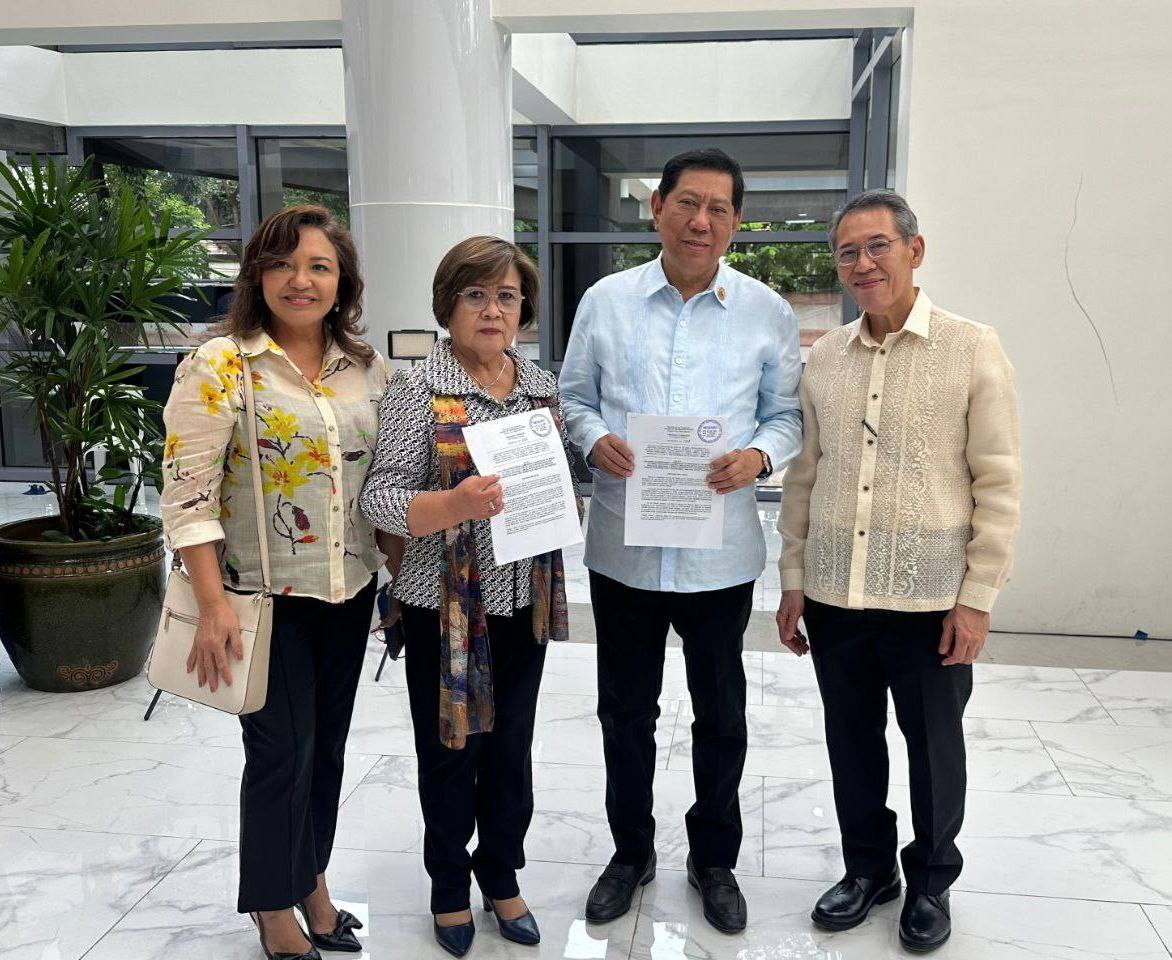
Diokno (right-most) files a bill with fellow representatives Krisel Lagman, Leila de Lima, and Edgar Erice to establish the Independent Commission for Infrastructure, September 9, 2025.

On May 14, 2025, Speaker Martin Romualdez invited Diokno as well as fellow representative-elect Leila de Lima to serve on the prosecution panel in the impeachment trial of Vice President Sara Duterte. The invitation was seconded by Representatives Joel Chua and Jay Khonghun, who noted the "background and legal expertise" of the representatives-elect as being beneficial to the panel. Diokno accepted the invitation. Akbayan, having endorsed the first impeachment complaint against Duterte, supported his participation in the panel. In response to his acceptance of the invitation, Duterte criticized Diokno for being "anti-Duterte since birth", which he refuted.

On July 30, 2025, Diokno was named as an Assistant House Deputy Minority Leader for the 20th Congress.

=== Impeachment trial of Sara Duterte ===
On Article II: alleged unexplained wealth and undeclared assets, Bicol Saro party-list Representative Terry Ridon serves as the lead prosecutor, while Diokno acts as the second lead prosecutor.

On July 15, 2026, the sixth day of the impeachment trial, Diokno urged the Senate impeachment court to issue subpoenas for the bank, tax, and Anti-Money Laundering Council (AMLC) records of Vice President Sara Duterte. He argued that a prior AMLC report showing over P3 billion in financial activity during Duterte's tenure as mayor of Davao City was highly relevant to the allegation of unexplained wealth. Addressing the court, Diokno asserted that "nothing can handcuff" the Senate's authority to try and decide the impeachment case, emphasizing that the truth is not confidential.

During Day 7 of the impeachment trial on July 20, 2026, Diokno spearheaded the legal arguments for the prosecution, maintaining that a subpoena for financial records is a standard procedural step rather than an unlawful "fishing expedition". Citing precedents from the 2012 Corona impeachment trial, Diokno successfully convinced the Senate impeachment court that examining comprehensive bank, tax, and Anti-Money Laundering Council (AMLC) documents was vital to establishing a factual baseline for Article II (unexplained wealth). His arguments directly countered the defense's claims of privacy violations, ultimately leading Presiding Officer Francis Escudero to grant the subpoenas for Vice President Sara Duterte and her husband's financial records.

On July 24 2026, Diokno became the target of a social media post by senator-judge Pia Cayetano that featured a spliced and misleading video clip falsely portraying him as admitting that the prosecution was proceeding without evidence; the altered footage subsequently prompted a coalition of women's rights advocates, academics, and civil society groups to file an ethics complaint against Cayetano with the Senate Committee on Ethics and Privileges for breaching her oath of impartiality and undermining the integrity of the court.

On September 23, 2026, during the impeachment trial proceedings, Diokno contributed to the debate on the two-thirds conviction threshold by arguing that the mathematical denominator should exclude senator-judges who are legally or physically incapable of participating, stating that a rigid baseline of 24 would be absurd, while emphasizing that altering the denominator affects both sides of the arithmetic equally rather than guaranteeing a conviction; subsequently, the senator-judges voted to adopt this adjusted approach, effectively lowering the required votes to convict.

== Political positions ==
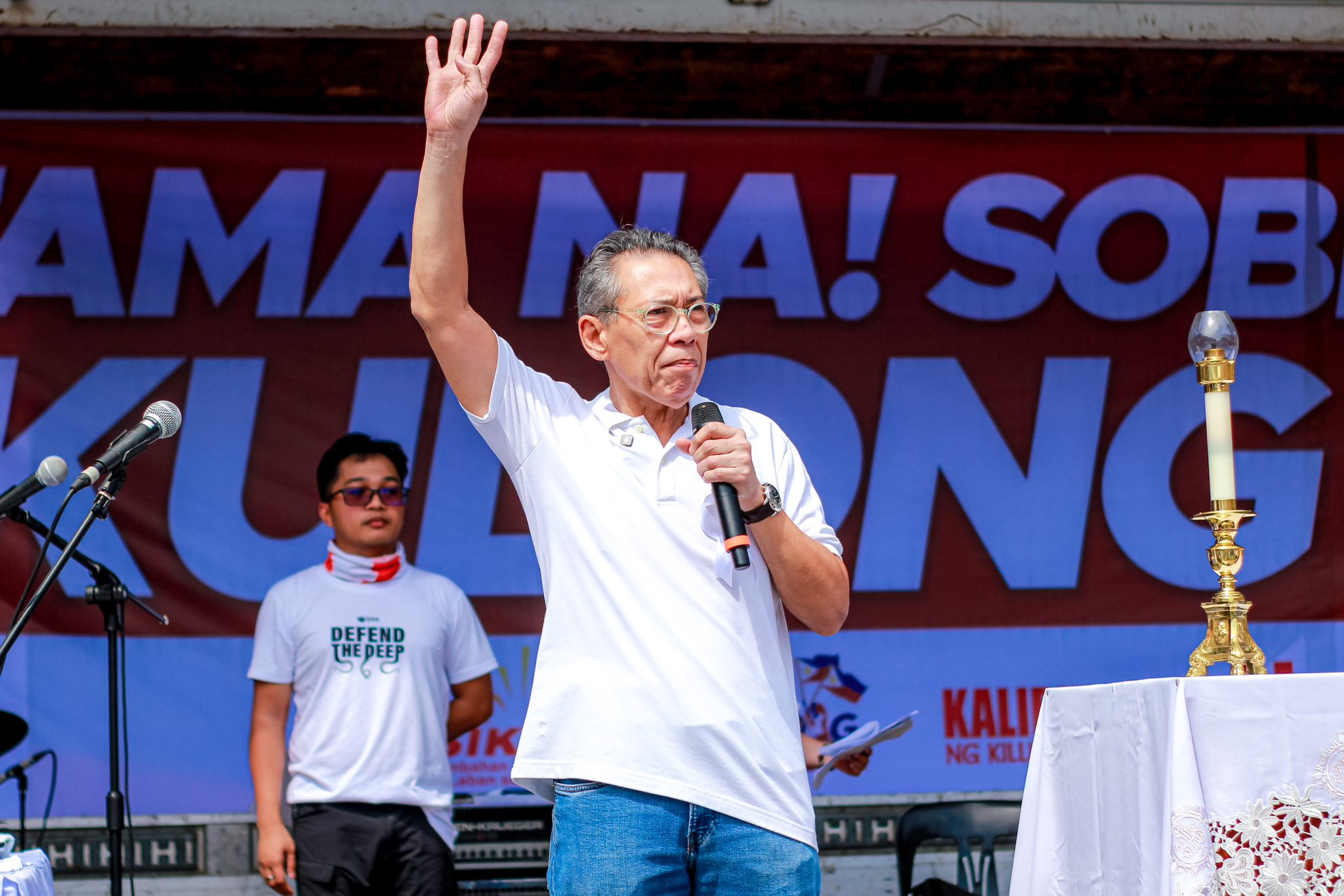
Diokno addresses the Trillion Peso March protest

GMA Integrated News and the Philippine Daily Inquirer note that Diokno's affiliations and statements align with liberalism and progressivism. Akbayan, Diokno's party since 2024, is a self-described social-democratic, progressive party. Diokno himself frames his work in progressive terms. He described Akbayan's agenda as "progressive and reform-oriented" and said he joined to continue his family's human-rights legacy. Party leaders echo this language: Akbayan Senator Risa Hontiveros praised Diokno's entry for bringing energy to a "stronger opposition and genuine democratic alternative" to entrenched dynasties.

=== Economy ===
Diokno has called attention to poverty, hunger, and unemployment as urgent challenges. In a 2019 forum, he argued against federalism by saying the core problem is economic: "Our problem is basically food and jobs… Food and jobs is connected to how we run our economy rather than our form of government." He emphasized that changing the political structure will not by itself "get more food on the table or bring more jobs." Instead, he supports targeted social spending: as a legislator-elect for Akbayan, he promised to sponsor a bill to give direct financial aid to college students to cover living expenses (on top of free tuition).

=== Education ===
Diokno supports public education investment. In 2025, he argued that the government must raise education spending to at least 6% of the gross domestic product, the level recommended by UNESCO, to address the country's "education crisis." He pointed out that underinvestment over decades has led to declining learning outcomes and urged that existing funds be better allocated to classroom needs. He also proposed expanding the coverage of free education: beyond free tuition at state colleges, he said students need extra support for allowances, textbooks, and nutrition. In March 2025, he pledged an "Allowance is Essential" bill to give poor college students stipends for daily expenses like transportation and food, noting that up to 39% of students drop out even with free tuition due to financial hardship. He likewise called for expanded feeding programs for young children and more instructional materials for schools, as well as higher salaries and benefits for teachers. Diokno frames education spending as an investment in the economy and society: "We need to provide all the necessary support to our teachers – adequate salary and supplies – so they can effectively fulfill their duties," he said, and to ensure students receive proper nutrition to learn effectively.

=== Foreign policy ===
Diokno emphasizes national sovereignty and international law in foreign affairs. He has defended the Philippines' territorial claims, especially in the West Philippine Sea. In 2019, he noted that the 1987 Constitution explicitly prohibits giving foreign "friends" any share in Philippine territorial waters, insisting that only Filipinos may exploit marine resources in the country's exclusive economic zone. He cited the constitution and laws (such as a Ferdinand Marcos Sr. decree) to argue that all offshore resources must remain under Philippine control and that no treaty or agreement can contravene this principle.

=== Human rights ===
As a human rights lawyer, Diokno has criticized the extrajudicial killings associated with the Rodrigo Duterte administration's drug war. During a 2024 Congressional hearing, he noted the government's own figures of over 20,000 drug-related deaths, emphasizing that none of the victims had been sentenced in court. Diokno told lawmakers that between July 2016 and November 2017, "all of these people…were not sentenced by a court. They were sentenced by armed men." He has also pointed out that Duterte's administration listed the drug-war deaths as "accomplishments," warning that including them among state achievements "may lead to the inference that these are state-sponsored killings."

Diokno has further advocated accountability through international justice mechanisms. In January 2024, he urged the Bongbong Marcos administration to cooperate with the International Criminal Court's (ICC) investigation of the drug war, arguing that under the Rome Statute the ICC retains jurisdiction over crimes committed before the Philippines withdrew its membership. He said victims of drug-related killings would only obtain justice "if we let the ICC investigators conduct an investigation here." In general, he has emphasized that survivors of state violence rarely receive justice domestically – for instance, noting that very few extrajudicial killing cases end in convictions.

Diokno also defends civil liberties and free expression. He was among the petitioners who challenged the Anti-Terrorism Act of 2020, arguing before the Supreme Court that its broad language could criminalize ordinary protests or online speech. He warned that even social media posts calling for peaceful rallies or boycotts might be treated as "acts intended to endanger a person's life" under the law.

=== Justice reform ===
Diokno has proposed several reforms to the justice system and law enforcement. He argues that the Philippine National Police (PNP) must be more accountable: for instance, he said he will push a "PNP Discipline Act" to strip the police of authority to discipline its own ranks, transferring that power to an independent civilian agency such as the Civil Service Commission. In doing so, he aims to prevent abuses by police officers and ensure impartial punishment for misconduct.

He opposes the reimposition of capital punishment. In 2019, Diokno explicitly stated he is "totally against the death penalty," noting that when the death penalty was previously applied, "70 percent of those…handed the death sentence were wrongfully convicted." He argues that life imprisonment is a harsher and more effective punishment than execution, stating, "For me, a life [prison] sentence is more punishment… It's really not how severe the punishment is, it's about how certain we are that you would go to jail." Diokno argues for stronger enforcement of laws rather than harsher penalties.

Diokno opposes lowering the minimum age of criminal responsibility. He pointed out that the proposed reduction (from age 15 down to 9 or 12) would mostly affect poor youth used by syndicates. He said that children involved in crime "should be treated as victims, not as criminals." He favors shifting from a purely punitive model to a rehabilitative, health-based approach for issues like juvenile crime and drug addiction. Diokno criticized mandatory drug testing of college students, suggesting instead that society should treat addiction as an illness requiring treatment. He said other countries have had more success in fighting drug problems by focusing on medical rehabilitation rather than criminalization.

On institutional reform, Diokno has decried political dynasties. He stated that term limits should extend beyond office-holders to include their families, so that an incumbent could not simply have an immediate relative succeed them in office.

=== Labor ===
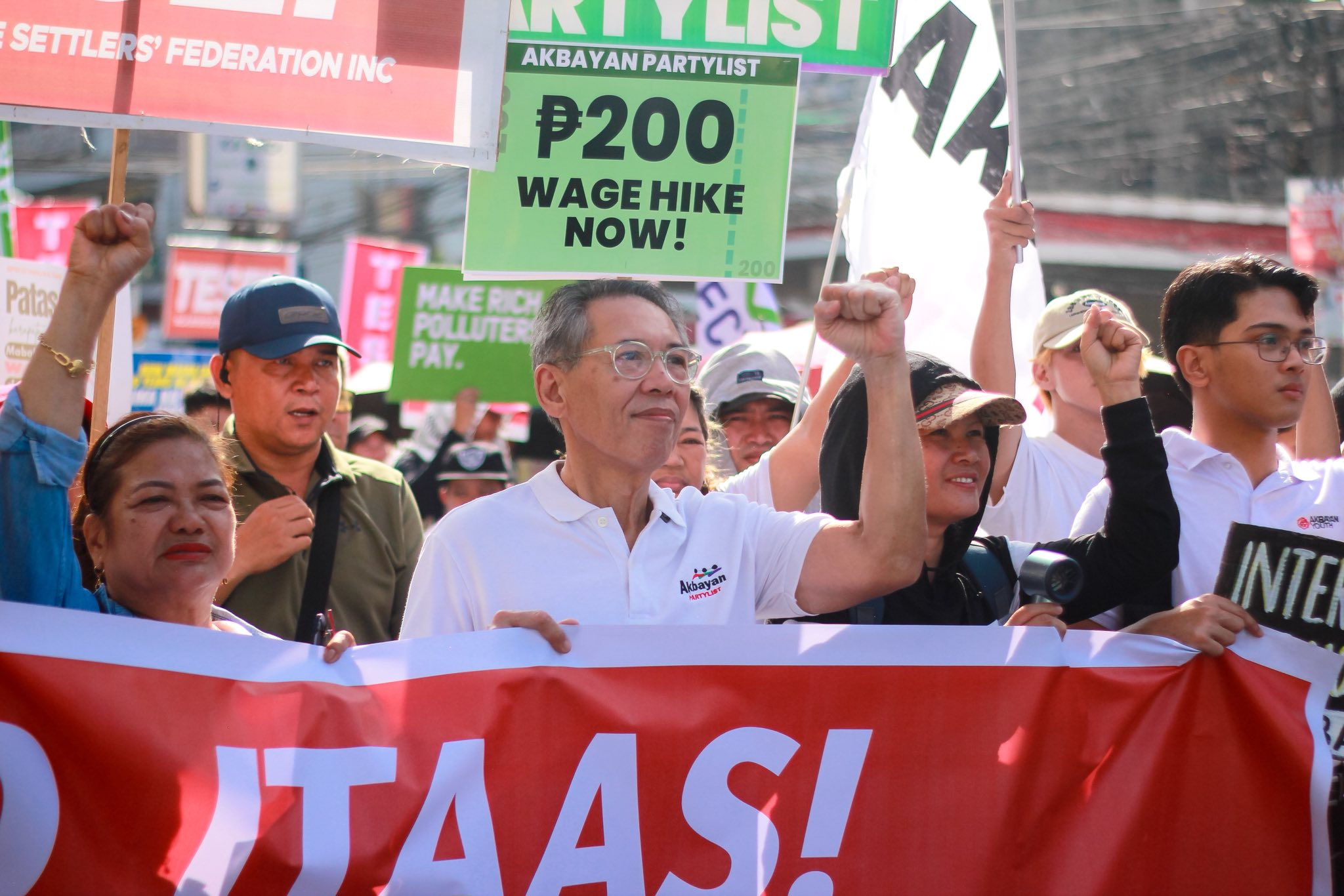
Diokno at the Labor Day rally in 2026

Diokno has sided with workers' rights and criticized government inaction. In a 2019 Labor Day message, he warned Filipino workers not to rely on President Rodrigo Duterte's administration to resolve their problems, noting that many pro-worker bills "remain unattended" in Congress. He specifically pointed out that legislation to end contractualization has stalled in the Senate and that even foreign workers have been given local jobs, saying Filipinos must assert "what is ours" rather than depend on politicians. In line with labor advocates, he favors measures such as raising wages and banning labor-only contracting.

=== Martial law under Ferdinand Marcos ===
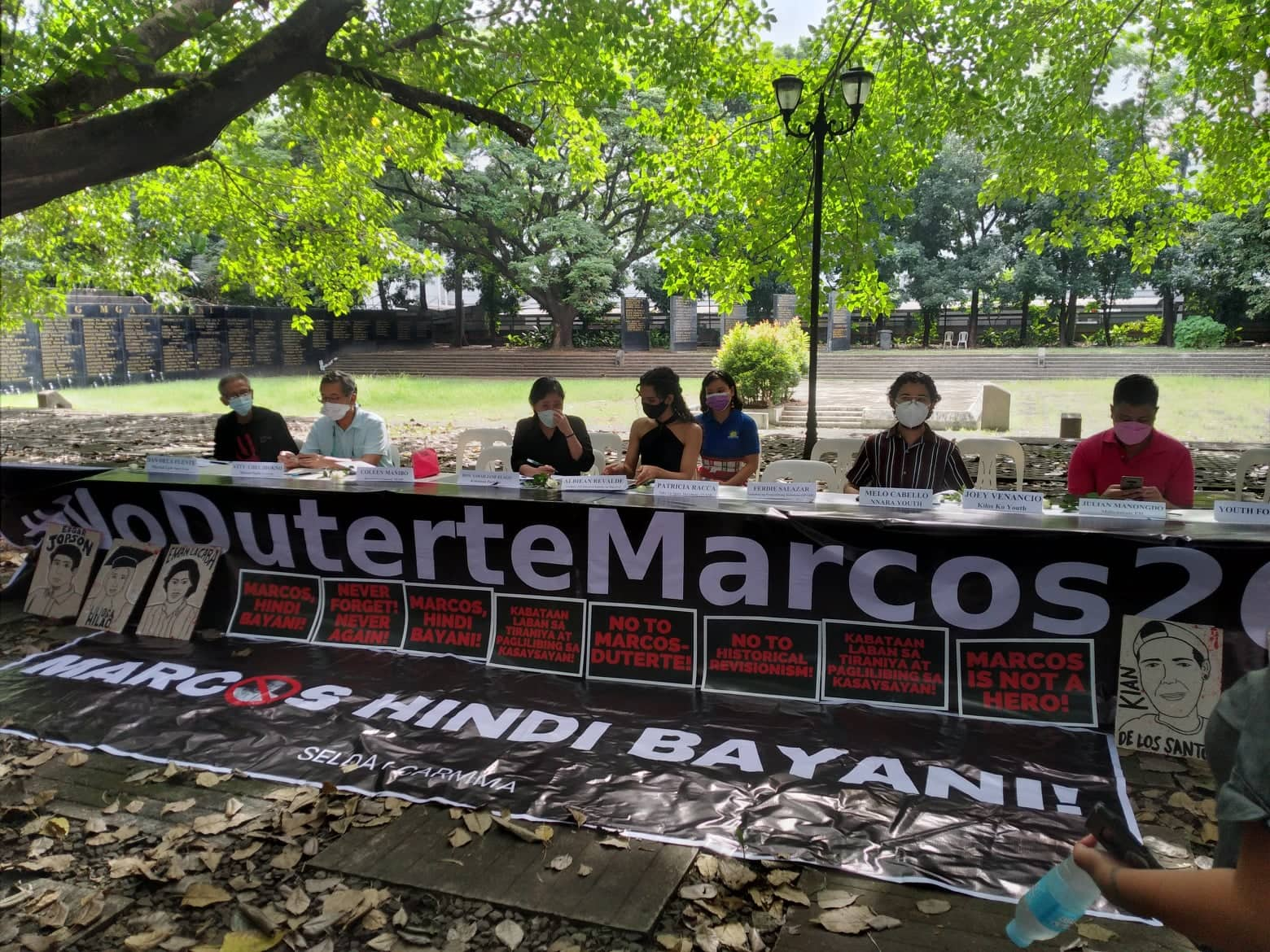
Diokno at a press conference opposing the Duterte–Marcos alliance.

As the son of former Senator and martial law critic Jose W. Diokno, Chel has criticized the historical negationism and denialism regarding the Philippines' martial law era under Ferdinand Marcos.

=== Social policy ===
Diokno supports legalizing divorce, saying that he has "no qualms" about it. He favorably cited a bill that would allow divorce after a long separation (e.g. five years), noting that it would reduce conflict compared to forcing couples to remain in abusive marriages. Diokno also indicated support for the legislative thread that provides grounds for annulment and divorce, saying current rules often force couples to falsely cite "psychological incapacity," which he said only breeds more resentment.

He also supports recognizing same-sex unions. In a 2019 forum, Diokno said that he backs the passage of the SOGIE Equality Bill and believes that LGBTQ rights should be fully protected by the state.

== Personal life ==
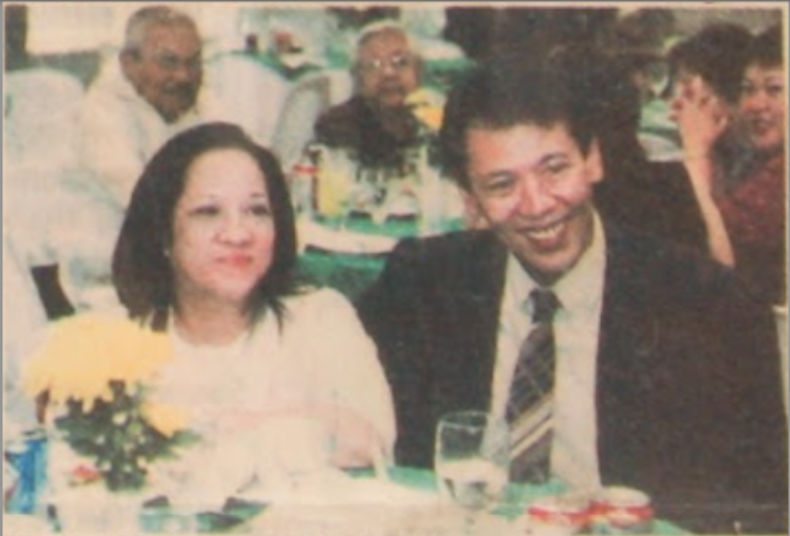
Chel Diokno as a human rights advocate with his wife Divina

Diokno is married to writer Divina Aromin. They have six children; their eldest son is filmmaker Pepe, named after his grandfather who died a few months before he was born in 1987. Their eldest daughter, Laya Elena, became a lawyer in 2022. Diokno also co-hosts radio programs such as Oras at Bayan on Veritas 846 and Rekta: Agenda ng Masa on DZRH and DZRH News Television. Diokno has also written news articles on forensic DNA, electronic evidence, anti-terrorism legislation, media law, and judicial reform.

Diokno frequently interacts with his supporters, known as Cheldren (portmanteau of Chel and children), through his social media platforms.

== Electoral history ==
Electoral history of Chel Diokno
Year	Office	Party	Votes received				Result
Year	Office	Party	Total	%	P.	Swing	Result
2019	Senator of the Philippines	Liberal	6,342,939	13.41%	21st	—N/a	Lost
2022	Senator of the Philippines	KANP	9,978,444	17.96%	19th	+4.55	Lost
2025	Representative (Party-list)	Akbayan	2,779,621	6.63%	1st	—N/a	Won

== Bibliography ==
- Diokno On Trial: The Techniques And Ideals Of The Filipino Lawyer (The Complete Guide To Handling A Case In Court), published by the Diokno Law Center in 2007
- Civil And Administrative Suits As Instruments Of Accountability For Human Rights Violations, published by the Asia Foundation in 2010
- Model Pleadings of Jose W. Diokno Volume 1: Supreme Court published by the Diokno Law Center in 2020.

== Ancestry ==
Ancestors of Chel Diokno

8. Gen. Ananías Diokno
4. J. Ramón Diokno
9. Paulina Marasigan
2. Sen. José W. Diokno
10. Roberto Wright
5. Leonor Wright
11. Irene Garcia
1. Jose Manuel I. "Chel" Diokno
12. Alipio Bello Ycasiano
6. Abelardo Icasiano
13. Ysmaela Reyes
3. Carmen Icasiano
14. Francisco Reyes
7. Carmen Reyes
15. Macaria Baptista

== See also ==
- Free Legal Assistance Group
- Jose W. Diokno
- Pepe Diokno (director)
- Maris Diokno
- Ananías Diokno
- Ramón Diokno
- Diokno family

Political offices
House of Representatives of the Philippines
Vacant Title last held by Barry Gutierrez; 2016	Member of the House of Representatives from Akbayan; 2025–present Served alongside: Perci Cendaña and Dadah Kiram Ismula (2025–)	Incumbent
