= Ramón Diokno =

Filipino lawyer and politician (1886–1954)

The Honorable Ramón M. Diokno
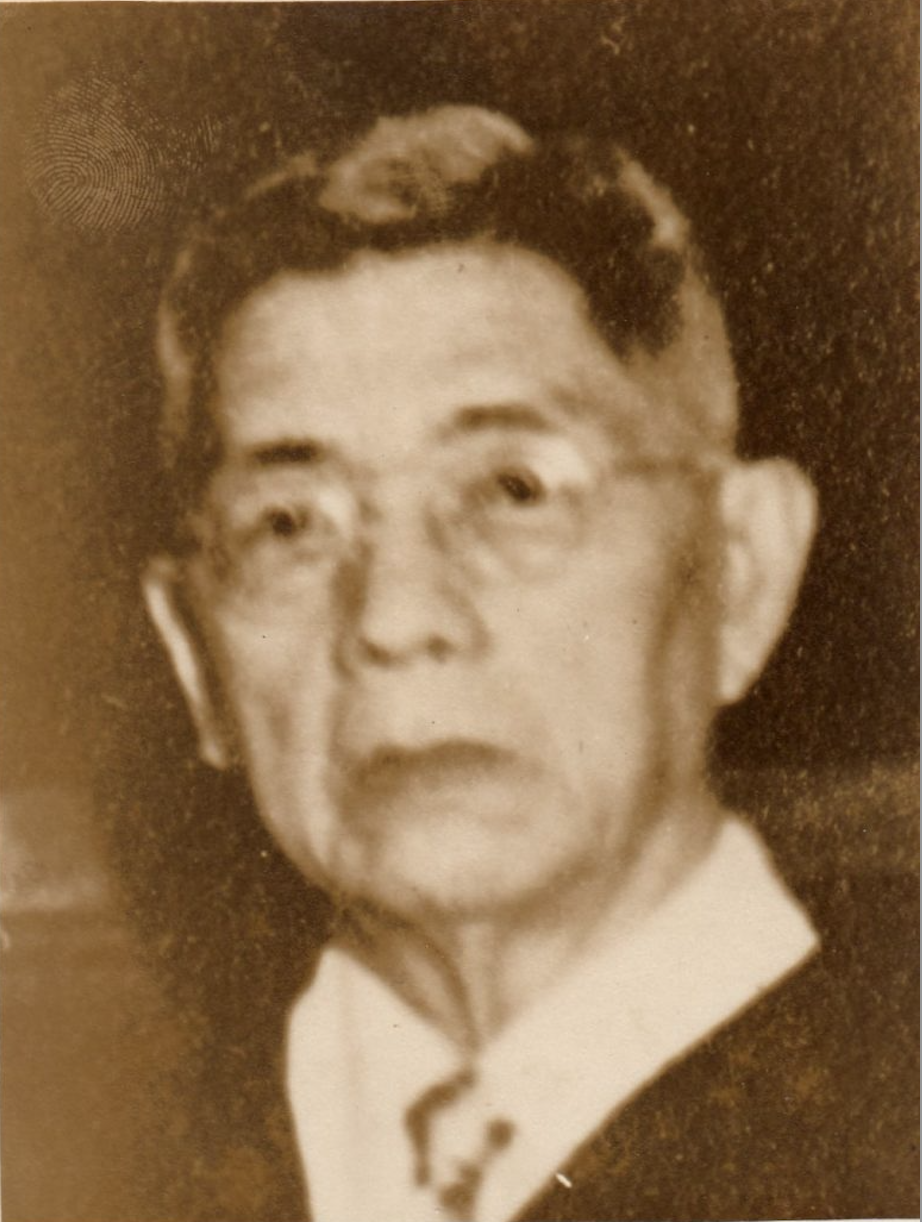
- Diokno in 1954

63rd Associate Justice of the Supreme Court of the Philippines
- In office February 10, 1954 – April 21, 1954
- Appointed by: Ramon Magsaysay
- Succeeded by: JBL Reyes

Senator of the Philippines
- In office May 25, 1946 – December 30, 1949

Member of the House of Representatives of the Philippine Islands from Batangas's 1st district
- In office February 18, 1933 – September 16, 1935
- Preceded by: Antonio de las Alas
- Succeeded by: Natialio López (as Assemblyman)
- In office October 16, 1916 – June 3, 1919
- Preceded by: Galicano Apacible
- Succeeded by: Vicente Lontoc

Personal details
- Born: Ramón Diokno y Marasigan; March 28, 1886 Taal, Batangas, Captaincy General of the Philippines
- Died: April 21, 1954 (aged 68) Baguio, Philippines
- Party: Nacionalista (1916–1954)
- Spouse(s): Martha Fello; Leonor Wright
- Children: 13, including José
- Education: Colegio de San Antonio de Padua

Ramón Diokno y Marasigan (March 28, 1886 – April 21, 1954) was a Filipino statesman, jurist, Associate Justice, and one of the foremost nationalists of his generation. He fought the American Parity Rights Amendment and was one of four senators to be ousted so that the amendment may be ratified. He later became Associate Justice under Ramon Magsaysay but had the shortest term when he died two months and eleven days later. Diokno is known as the very first Government Corporate Counsel (Office of the GCC) in history from 1935 to December 1941 when the war began. Justice Diokno is famous for writing the ponencia in the Resolution for the In Re: Albino Cunanan, et al.

== Early life and education ==
Diokno was born in Taal, Batangas on March 28, 1886, as the only son to Ananías Diokno, head of the Visayan forces during the Philippine Revolution and Philippine–American War, and Paulina Marasigan. Diokno had four half-siblings from his father's second wife Emilia Rivera. Diokno's ancestor was the governor-general Felix Berenguer de Marquina, the namesake of Marikina City. Diokno received his primary instruction in Taal and continued his studies in a private school in Manila under Felipe Buencamino Sr. and in Colegio de San Antonio de Padua under Supreme Court Justice Ignacio Villamor.

== Legal career ==
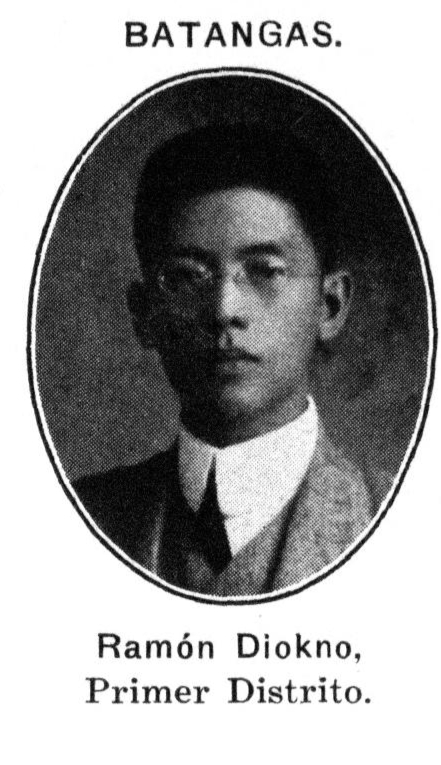
Diokno as member of the Philippine House of Representatives, c. 1917

Diokno was admitted to the practice of law in April 1905. While he was a student, he was the founding president of the Asociacion Escolar de Filipinas. He also founded the Colegio la Ilustracion and Rizal University, where he taught as a professor. He was editor of La Fraternidad and El Nacionalista, and was president of the labor union, Union del Trabajo de Filipinas and the Union de Marinus de Filipinas. He was a Mason at the Sinkuan Lodge and in charge of the Nilad Lodge, which he led for two years. He then influenced his son José Wright "Ka Pepe" Diokno to join the Nilad Lodge No. 12. He was also one of the founders of the Gram Logia Regional de Filipinas.

He was also corporate counsel for the Philippine National Bank, Manila Railroad Company, Manila Hotel Company, National Loan and Investment Board, Metropolitan Water District, National Development Company, Cebu Portland Cement Company, and National Produce Exchange. Diokno was encouraged to run in 1946 for the senate seat and won a three-year term to serve until 1949. However, much of his votes were then disenfranchised due to provinces undergoing violence from the HUKBALAHAP throughout the year. Diokno thus filed a lawsuit together with other candidates such as Jose O. Vera against the government and was represented by his son, the young topnotcher José in his first landmark Supreme Court case entitled Vera v. Avelino, G.R. No. L-543. The solicitor-general Lorenzo Tañada remarked how astonished he was at the photographic memory of the father and son duo during trial.

== Public servant ==
Diokno won the special election for city councilor in the Northern District of Batangas in 1918 and in 1933. In the September 17, 1935 Commonwealth Election, he was the chief campaign manager of Manuel L. Quezon and was appointed as the inaugural Corporate Counsel in 1935. He became a senator in 1946 which involved a battle in court against the Commission on Elections not counting certain ballots, represented by his son José.

Diokno opposed the Hare-Hawes Cutting Act due to the lack of provisions prohibiting American military bases. He was an ally of Manuel Quezon who pushed for the Tydings-McDuffie Act which included the provision.

== Later life and legacy ==
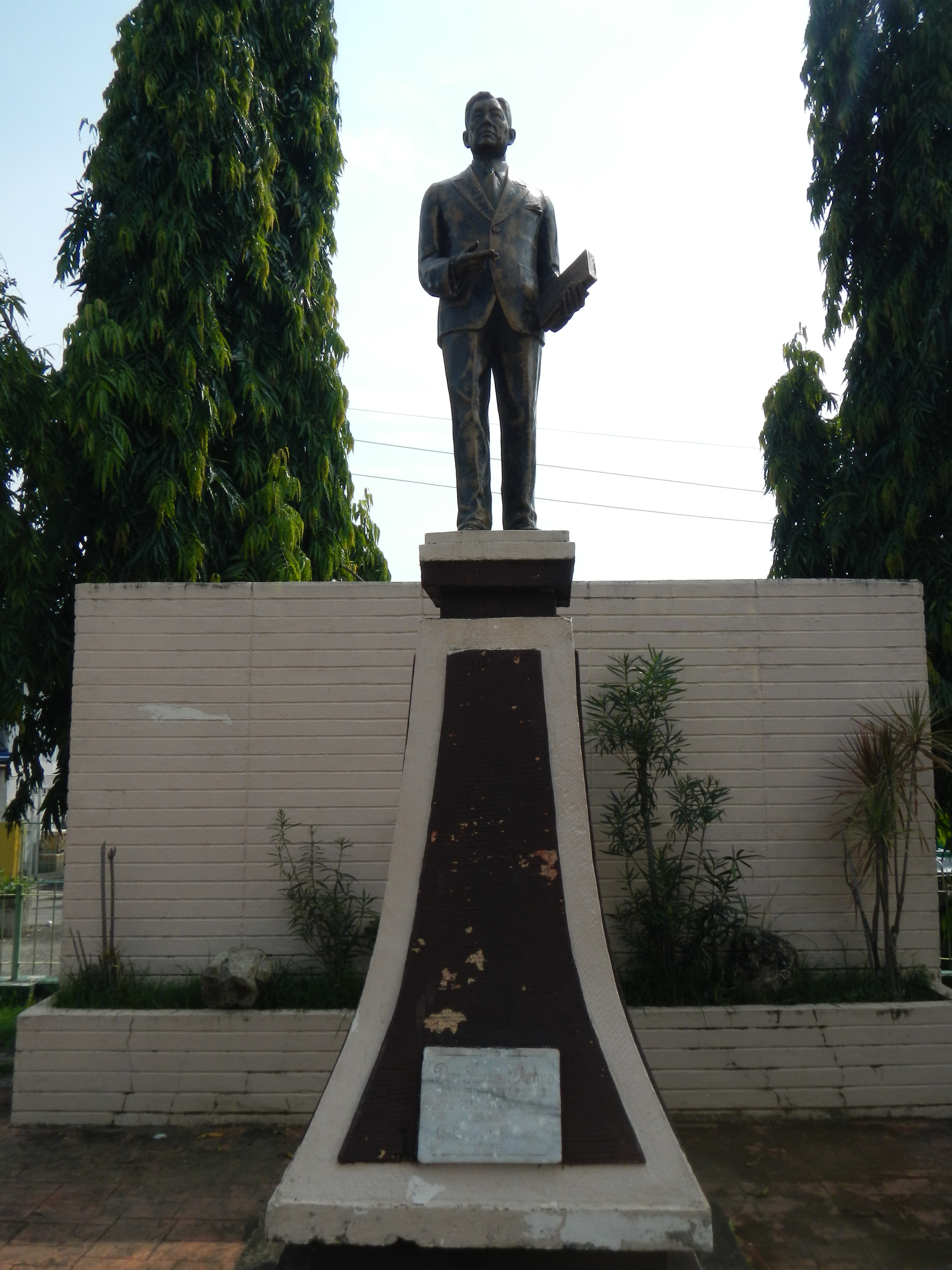
Monument of Sen. Diokno at the center of the San Luis Town Plaza

Diokno married Martha Fello and had six children. After her death, he married a Filipino-American of English descent named Leonor Wright, and they had eight children. Diokno frequently only spoke Spanish and banned English at home, forcing his son José to learn from a tutor. Diokno insisted many of his sons take up the study of law. His son eventually topped the bar exam in 1944 and defended him in many cases against the abuses of the government. Diokno was appointed to the Supreme Court but succumbed to a heart attack a month later in 1954 during a Supreme Court trip to Baguio. His wake was on April 25, 1954, and was buried in his requested hometown of Taal, Batangas. Ramón Diokno Highway in Lemery, Batangas is named after him.

== Personal life and descendants ==
Diokno met his first wife Martha Fello and had over ten children. After her death, he married Leonor Garcia Wright from Pandacan. His son is former Senator José Wright Diokno, the father of human rights and founder of the largest human rights firm called the Free Legal Assistance Group (FLAG). Diokno is the grandfather of Atty. Jose Manuel Tadeo I. "Chel" Diokno, the founding dean of the De La Salle University (DLSU) Tañada-Diokno School of Law. Diokno raised his children to speak Spanish at home, out of nationalism and wariness of the Americans, yet educated them with private English tutors and sent them to prestigious American-run schools such as DLSU near Ermita, where they resided. José described his father as calm, one with silent humor, religious and devout, and wise. Diokno moved his residence to 125 Aguado St., San Miguel, Manila, which was closer to Malacañang Palace, upon becoming senator.

=== Ancestry ===
Ancestors of Ramón Diokno

4. Ángel Diokno
2. Ananías Diokno
6. Juan Noblejas
5. María Andrea Noblejas y Sauza
8. Santiago Sauza y delos Ríos
7. Restituta María del Carmen Sauza y Berenguer de Marquina
9. Ysabel Berenguer de Marquina y Sumulong
1. Ramón Diokno
3. Paulina Marasigan
