= Voltaire Y. Rosales =

Filipino Executive Judge

Voltaire Antonio Ylagan Rosales
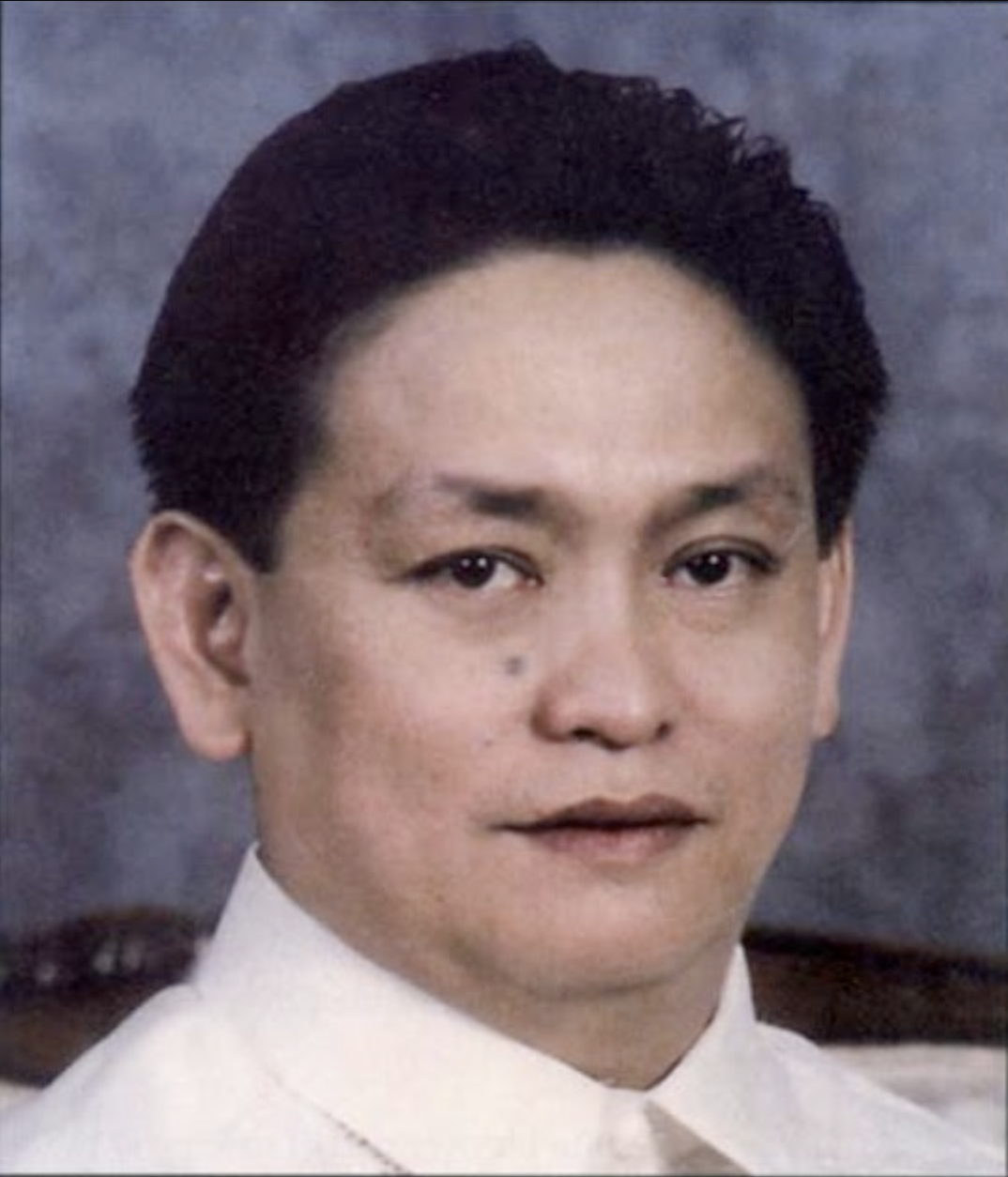

Executive Judge Regional Trial Court Branch 83 Tanauan, Batangas, Philippines
- In office 1995–2004

Executive Regional Trial Court Judge
- In office 1995 – June 10, 2004

Personal details
- Born: May 30, 1956 Manila, Philippines
- Died: June 10, 2004 (aged 48) Tanauan, Batangas, Philippines
- Spouse: Atty. Ma. Filomena L. Rosales
- Profession: Executive RTC Judge, Lawyer, Government Solicitor

Voltaire Ylagan "Butch" Rosales was a Filipino Executive Judge of the Regional Trial Court, Branch 83, Tanauan, Batangas, Philippines.

== Early life and education ==
Judge Voltaire Rosales obtained his Bachelor of Arts from the De La Salle University where he majored in Political Science. From there he went on to receive his LLB from the Ateneo Law School where he was a scholar and a member of the Fraternal Order of Utopia.

Voltaire Y. Rosales took the bar examinations in 1981 and landed in the twenty-fifth place with a grade of 84.5 percent. He then started his legal career as an attorney at the Santos, Balgos and Perez Law Office. After, Voltaire Rosales worked as Chief of Staff for Congressman Rafael B. Legaspi of the lone district of Aklan.

In 1986, he joined the Office of the Solicitor General and rose to the rank of Senior Solicitor. Ten years after, in 1995, he was sworn in as a Regional Trial Court Judge of Tanauan, Batangas by Chief Justice Reynato Puno. Soon after he was promoted to Executive Judge assigned to handle multiple salas handling severe crimes.

== As an Executive RTC Judge ==
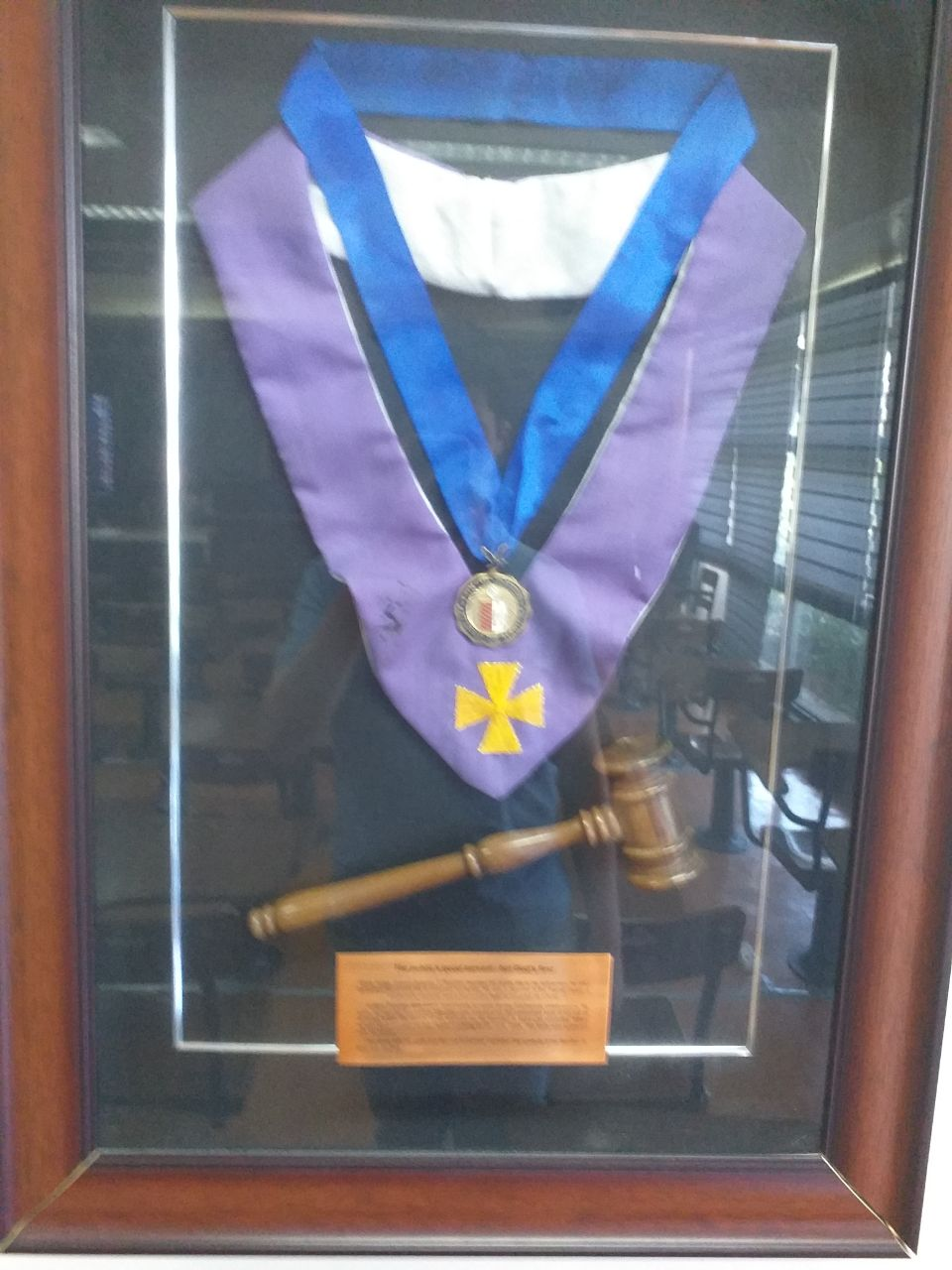
Judge Rosales's Memorabilia at the Judge Voltaire Rosales Room at the Ateneo Law School

While serving as a judge, Rosales soon started receiving offers of bribery and threats to his life, though he generally ignored these bribes and death threats. Rosales would later convict a criminal named German Agojo, which is suspected to play a role in Rosales' assassination. Agojo would be sentenced to death at Bilibid Prison, Muntinlupa. Despite the threats to Rosales' life becoming more serious, he refused to follow up his transfer to a safer jurisdiction. He believed that if he was to be killed in the line of duty, it was through a divine will.

== Death and legacy ==
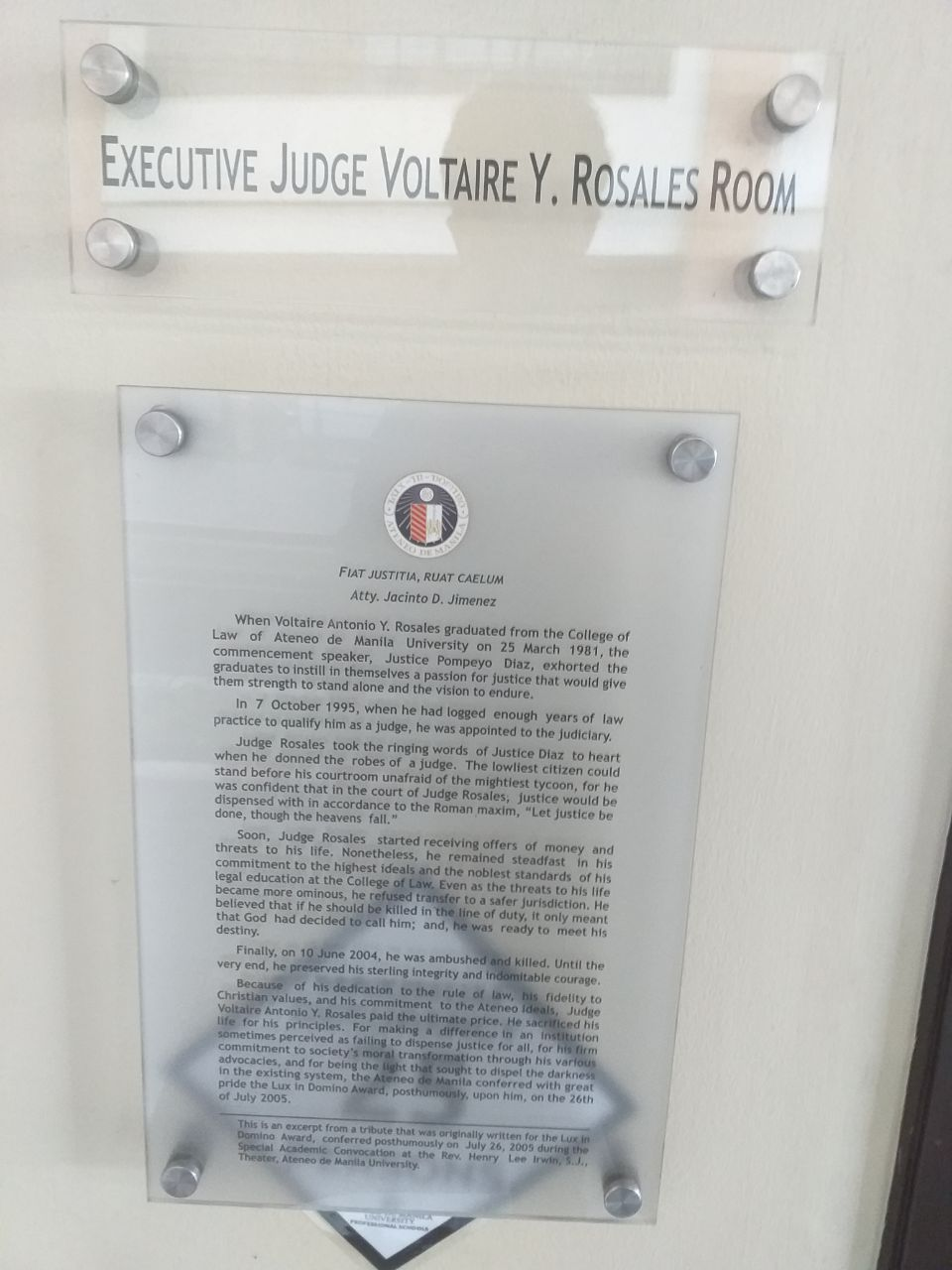
Ateneo Law School's only classroom named in honor of a Judge

On June 10, 2004 he was assassinated a few meters away from his court by shooters riding-in-tandem while walking home. It was suspected that his assassination was related to the Agojo drug case he was handling as a Heinous Crimes Judge.

== Awards and recognition ==
Since his murder he has been honored with several awards, such as the inaugural Ka Pepe Diokno Human Rights Award in 2005, the Lux in Domino by the Ateneo de Manila University, a Special Citation from the Provincial Peace and Order Council of Batangas (2004), a Kampon ni Pakakak Award (2004), the Fraternal Order of Utopia's President's Awards for Excellence (2005), and the Barangay Dasmariñas Government Service/ Law Award (2006). On June 10, 2014, Ateneo Law School honored Judge Rosales by dedicating a law school classroom in his name. The room, now called the "Executive Judge Voltaire Y. Rosales Room" was blessed after a Red Mass in his honor. This is one of three classrooms named after alumni of the school, with the other being Antique Gov. Evelio Javier and human rights lawyer Bobby Arevalo Gana; Rosales is the only judge with this honor of having a classroom in his name, and all three share the similarity of being martyred or dying at a young age.

== Effects of his death on the judiciary ==
After his assassination in 2004, the Supreme Court of the Philippines abolished the heinous crimes court (courts tasked to decide cases on kidnapping, robbery, murder and other felonies punishable by death) in order to diffuse concentration of heinous crimes on a single Judge.

In 2009, Agojo, the drug lord whom Judge Rosales convicted of violating the Philippine Dangerous Drugs Act was suspected of sending death threats to Supreme Court Justice Arturo Brion. Justice Brion reportedly blocked the acquittal of Agojo and affirmed the conviction of the death sentence.
