= Perci Cendaña =

Filipino politician (born 1976)

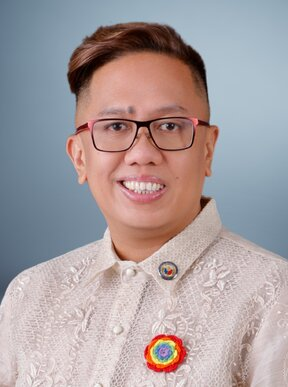
- Official portrait, 2026

Member of the Philippine House of Representatives for Akbayan
- Incumbent
- Assumed office September 25, 2024 Serving with Chel Diokno and Dadah Kiram Ismula (since 2025)
- Preceded by: Tom Villarin (2019)

House Deputy Minority Leader
- Incumbent
- Assumed office July 30, 2025
- Leader: Marcelino Libanan

Commissioner for Luzon of the National Youth Commission
- In office 2011–2016
- President: Benigno Aquino III
- Chair: Leon Flores III (2011–2013); Gio Tingson (2013–2016)

Chair of the UP Diliman University Student Council
- In office 1997–1998
- Preceded by: Barry Gutierrez
- Succeeded by: Giancarlo Sambalido

Personal details
- Born: Percival Vilar Cendaña; September 6, 1976 (age 50) Cabanatuan, Nueva Ecija, Philippines
- Party: Akbayan
- Education: University of the Philippines Diliman (BA)
- Occupation: Politician, writer

Percival "Perci" Vilar Cendaña (born September 6, 1976) is a Filipino politician and writer who has served as the representative for the Akbayan Party-list since September 25, 2024.

== Early life and education ==
Cendaña was born on September 6, 1976, in Cabanatuan, Nueva Ecija, Philippines. He pursued higher education at the University of the Philippines Diliman (UP Diliman), where he earned a Bachelor of Arts degree in Philippine Studies major in Philippine Literature and Political Science. During his time at UP Diliman, Cendaña, a writer, became actively involved in student activism, serving as Chair of the UP Diliman University Student Council from 1997 to 1998.

== National Youth Commission (2011–2016) ==
After graduating, Cendaña continued his advocacy work, focusing on youth empowerment and human rights. In 2011, he was appointed as Commissioner for Luzon of the National Youth Commission (NYC) under the administration of President Benigno Aquino III. During his tenure, he promoted programs for youth development, education, and participation in governance.

== House of Representatives (since 2024) ==
Cendaña ran as the first nominee of the Akbayan Party-list in the 2022 elections. Although Akbayan initially fell short of securing a seat in the House of Representatives, the party was later proclaimed a winner after the disqualification of the An Waray party-list by the Commission on Elections (COMELEC) on August 14, 2023. Cendaña was sworn in as a member of the House of Representatives on September 25, 2024.

In 2025, Cendaña ran for re-election as the second nominee of Akbayan. The party-list would go on to win the most votes in the election, securing 3 seats in the House of Representatives. He along with fellow Akbayan nominees Chel Diokno and Dadah Kiram Ismula were sworn in as members of the House of Representatives on July 28, 2025.

== Political positions ==
=== Drug policy ===
In November 2024, Cendaña introduced House Bill No. 11044, known as the "Kian Bill." This proposed legislation seeks to ban practices such as "tokhang," drug lists, and torture associated with the Philippine drug war. The bill is named after Kian delos Santos, a teenager whose death during an anti-drug operation sparked national outrage. Cendaña's bill aims to promote accountability and human rights in the government's approach to drug enforcement.

=== LGBTQ+ rights ===
Cendaña has long been an advocate for LGBTQ+ rights in the Philippines. He has emphasized the need for legal recognition, comprehensive anti-discrimination legislation, and the creation of inclusive public spaces. His advocacy has been marked by strong support for legal frameworks that affirm the rights and identities of LGBTQ+ individuals. Cendaña has consistently pushed for laws that protect against discrimination based on sexual orientation and gender identity, as well as policies that promote safer and more inclusive environments for the LGBTQ+ community across various sectors.

=== Youth empowerment ===
Drawing on his experience as a former commissioner of the National Youth Commission, Cendaña has been a strong advocate for youth empowerment. He has actively promoted youth participation in governance and policy-making, emphasizing the importance of accessible, quality education and the creation of safe, supportive spaces for young people to engage and thrive in their communities.

== Personal life ==
Cendaña is an openly gay man. He suffered from stroke after the first day of 2016 election campaign in Iloilo City which affected his facial expressions, but recovered after three months, and his full mobility after a year.

== Electoral history ==
Electoral history of Perci Cendaña
Year	Office	Party	Votes received				Result
Year	Office	Party	Total	%	P.	Swing	Result
2022	Representative (Party-list)	Akbayan	236,226	0.65%	56th	—N/a	Won
2025	Representative (Party-list)	Akbayan	2,779,621	6.63%	1st	+5.98	Won

Political offices
House of Representatives of the Philippines
Vacant Title last held by Tom Villarin; 2019	Member of the House of Representatives from Akbayan; 2024–present Served alongside: Chel Diokno and Dadah Kiram Ismula (2025–)	Incumbent
