= Dadah Kiram Ismula =

Filipina politician and Moro women leader (born 1985)

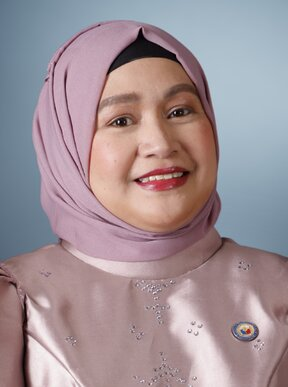
- Official portrait, 2026

Member of the Philippine House of Representatives for Akbayan
- Incumbent
- Assumed office June 30, 2025 Serving with Chel Diokno and Perci Cendaña

Personal details
- Born: Haima Kiram Ismula; February 26, 1985 (age 41)
- Party: Akbayan
- Occupation: Politician

Haima "Dadah" Kiram Ismula (born February 26, 1985) is a Filipino Moro politician and indigenous leader who is a representative for Akbayan Partylist since 2025. She was elected to the House of Representatives of the Philippines in 2025, as the third nominee of the Akbayan Partylist, which won three seats in an upset victory.

== House of Representatives ==
=== Election ===
Ismula was named as the third nominee of the Akbayan Citizens' Action Party for the 2025 Philippine House of Representatives elections, after human rights lawyer Chel Diokno and incumbent representative Perci Cendaña.

On February 11, 2025, the first day of the campaign period, Kiram-Ismula led a fluvial parade featuring the region's vintas off the coast of her native Zamboanga City to showcase her heritage as a member of the indigenous people belonging to the Sama Bangingi tribe and Moro communities. Her campaign pushed for progressive change and advocated for the rights of marginalized indigenous and Moro communities.

=== Tenure ===
On June 30, 2025, Kiram-Ismula, along with fellow Akbayan nominees Chel Diokno and Perci Cendaña, were sworn in as members of the House of Representatives.

Political offices
House of Representatives of the Philippines
Vacant Title last held by Risa Hontiveros; 2004	Member of the House of Representatives from Akbayan; 2025–present Served alongside: Chel Diokno and Perci Cendaña (2025–)	Incumbent
