= Tañada-Diokno School of Law =

Law school of De La Salle University in Malate, Manila

- Former names: De La Salle University College of Law (until 2022); Tañada-Diokno College of Law (2022-2023)
- Type: Private
- Established: 2009
- Dean: Atty. Virgilio R. De Los Reyes
- Associate Dean for Clinical Legal Education: Atty. Nestor M. Leynes
- Location: Bonifacio Global City, Taguig, Philippines
- Assistant Dean for Administration: Mr. Andylyn M. Simeon
- Assistant Dean for Academic Advising: Atty. Mcgyver L. Doria
- Website: https://www.dlsu.edu.ph/tdsol/

The Tañada-Diokno School of Law is the law school and one of the eight schools of De La Salle University.

== History ==
The school was founded in 2009 on the principles of human rights and civil liberties by human rights Atty. Jose Manuel I. "Chel" Diokno, who is the chairman of the largest human rights group in the Free Legal Assistance Group or FLAG, and classes started in 2010. The mission of the school was to create morally grounded and well-rounded individuals ready to serve the oppressed and take a stand on these issues. This became the blueprint for all subjects in the school regardless of the selected area of study for each student, which was a first in Philippine legal education. The school introduced the practice of using "The Green Notes" to aid students in reviewing for all legal topics in lieu of fraternity and sorority assistance, as such groups were prohibited by the school. Student organizations, however, continue to thrive among the students.

In 2013, the school created the Development Legal Advocacy Center (DLAC), which is the main pillar of its clinical legal education program.

The first COL batch composed of 46 graduate students, took the bar exam in 2014 and gave the University a 56.5 percent passing rate on its first attempt, which was the highest among private institutions.

In the Academic Year 2016-2017, the school moved to the Rufino Campus in Bonifacio Global City, which houses 17 classrooms run on solar power, an auditorium, an arbitration room, and a moot court.

In 2019, the school shifted from a thesis Juris Doctor program to a non-thesis Juris Doctor program. In 2021, the school became one of the first five law schools that adopted the Revised Model Curriculum mandated by the Legal Education Board. It was renamed on February 26, 2022, which was Jose W. Diokno's birth centennial, as the Tañada-Diokno College of Law, now the Tañada-Diokno School of Law, in honor of Diokno and Lorenzo Tañada, both senators, nationalists, and De La Salle College high school alumni, while Diokno also took up Commerce and topped the Certified Public Accountants Board Exam in 1940.

In 2024, the law school celebrated a milestone, its 10th graduation on October 15. Justice Jhosep Lopez delivered the keynote recognition speech at The Verdure, Henry Sy, Sr. Hall, De La Salle University-Manila.

== Board ==
Its Board of Advisers is composed of former Chief Justice Artemio V. Panganiban, and former Justices Florentino Feliciano, Josue Bellosillo, Anselmo T. Reyes, and environmental lawyer and fellow alumnus Atty. Antonio Oposa Jr.

== Ka Pepe Diokno Human Rights Award ==
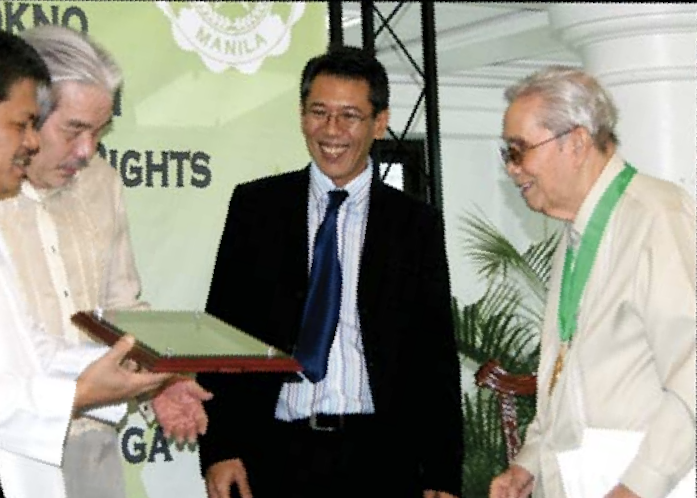
2010 recipient Sen. Jovito R. Salonga with Law school host and Dean Chel Diokno, together with Bro. Armin Luistro

In 2005, the De La Salle Professional Schools, Inc. Graduate School of Business (DLS-PSI-GSB) handed out the inaugural "Ka Pepe Diokno Human Rights Award", one of the most prestigious human rights awards in the country. This award is partly organized by the university, together with the entire university board and the Jose W. Diokno Foundation. The pioneer Ka Pepe Diokno Human Rights Award was conferred on Voltaire Y. Rosales, Executive Judge of Tanauan, Batangas for his conviction of suspects despite the death threats against him, even giving up his life due to his principles. Subsequent annual awards have been given to recognize persons or groups such as Jovito Salonga, Maria Ressa and Bishop Pablo Virgilio "Ambo " David, who exemplified their commitment to the furtherance of human rights, social justice, and Philippine sovereignty.

=== Winners ===
Year	Recipient	Notes
2005	Voltaire Rosales	RTC Judge
2006	Mariani Dimaranan	Nun and Founder of the Task Force Detainees of the Philippines
2007	Augusto "Bobbit" Sanchez	Secretary of Labor
2010	Jovito Salonga	Senate President
2012	Zenaida "Nini" Quezon-Avanceña	Founder of the Concerned Women of the Philippines
2012	Francisco B. Cruz	Attorney of the "Negros Nine", Ka Pepe Diokno Lifetime Achievement Awardee
2013	Sen. Wigberto "Bobby" Tañada	Senator, TOFIL (The Outstanding Filipino) Awardee, Chairman of Bantayog ng mga Bayani
2019	Ambo David	Bishop of Kalookan
2019	Maria Ressa	Rappler CEO
2020	The (Manila) Nightcrawlers	Journalists on the war on drugs
2021	Benigno Aquino III	President
2021	Antonio Carpio	Supreme Court Justice
2021	Conchita Carpio-Morales	Supreme Court Justice
2021	Albert del Rosario	Foreign Affairs Secretary

In 2008, a special citation was bestowed on non-Filipinos who advocated for the same principles of human rights as Senator Diokno famously masterfully accomplished in international law and in international conventions he personally directed or founded including the SOS-Torture convention, Human Rights Information and Documentation Systems (HURIDOCS), and certain UN Conventions involving democratic issues. A special citation based on the award was then conferred on Dr. Sriprapha Petcharamesree, a political scientist who was Director of the Ph.D. Program in Human Rights and Peace Studies (International) of the Institute of Human Rights and Peace Studies at a Thai research institute and the Thai Representative to the ASEAN Intergovernmental Commission on Human Rights, a role she served in until December 2012. In addition, she became Co-Chair of the Working Group for an ASEAN Human Rights Mechanism advocating for effective regional human rights systems in the ASEAN region, which Diokno once similarly accomplished by forming the Regional Council on Human Rights in Asia and its subsequent human rights declaration, the first human rights declaration of its kind in the region's democratic history.
