= Akbayan =

Progressive political party in the Philippines

Akbayan Citizens' Action Party
- President: Rafaela David
- Chairperson: Mylene Hega
- Secretary-General: Jordan Gutierrez
- Founder: Ronald Llamas
- Founded: January 1998
- Preceded by: Kaakbay ng Sambayanan
- Headquarters: 52 Masikap Street, Barangay Pinyahan, Quezon City
- Youth wing: Akbayan Youth
- Women's wing: Akbayan Women
- Membership: 200,000
- Ideology: Progressivism; Democratic socialism; Social democracy; Participatory politics
- Political position: Centre-left to left-wing
- National affiliation: KiBam (2025); TRoPa (2022); Otso Diretso (2019); Daang Matuwid (2016); Team PNoy (2013); Liberal (2010); Laban ng Masa I (2005)
- Regional affiliation: Network of Social Democracy in Asia
- International affiliation: Progressive Alliance; International League of Religious Socialists
- Colors: Red Green Purple
- Slogan: 'Pag mahal mo, Akbayan mo! (transl. If you love [someone], give [that someone] the support/pat on the shoulder)
- Senate: 1 / 24
- House of Representatives: 3 / 64 (Party-list seats)
- Provincial Governors: 0 / 82
- Provincial Vice Governors: 0 / 82
- Provincial board members: 3 / 840

Website
- akbayan.org.ph

The Akbayan Citizens' Action Party, better known as Akbayan (lit. 'the escorting of each other' or 'the support for one another' or 'the collective putting of an arm over the shoulders of another'), is a progressive political party in the Philippines. The party is noted as a leading member of the progressive movement in the Philippines.

The party was founded in 1998 by a variety of progressive and left-leaning political organizations. Currently, the party holds one seat in the Senate, and three seats in the House of Representatives as a multi-sectoral party-list. Internationally, the party is a member of the Progressive Alliance and the regional Network of Social Democracy in Asia.

== History ==
=== Origins and early years (1992–2009) ===
Akbayan traces its roots to the Kaakbay ng Sambayanan, an alliance founded on February 25, 1992, by various civil society organizations and left-leaning organizations from the country's social democratic, democratic socialist, and Marxist traditions, such as the “independent socialists and Marxists” from the Bukluran sa Ikauunlad ng Sosyalistang Isip at Gawa (BISIG), Pandayan para sa Sosyalistang Pilipinas (PANDAYAN), and Movement for Popular Democracy (MPD). Unlike other left-leaning groups, the organizations were committed to electoral participation. The alliance was formed in support of the presidential candidacy of Liberal Jovito Salonga and his running-mate Nene Pimentel from PDP–Laban under the Koalisyong Pambansa in the 1992 presidential and vice presidential elections, who eventually lost to Fidel V. Ramos of Lakas–NUCD and Joseph Estrada of NPC respectively.

Following the defeat of the Koalisyong Pambansa ticket, Akbayan was reestablished as a political party. Initially revived as Aksyon, the party eventually adopted the name Akbayan Citizens' Action Party. The party was officially founded in January 1998 and participated in the 1998 House of Representatives elections through the new party-list system, securing one seat in the House of Representatives. Aside from the party-list elections, the party also focused on electing candidates in local elections.

Akbayan members protesting the granting of bail to former President Gloria Macapagal-Arroyo who was then facing plunder charges

During the administration of former President Gloria Macapagal Arroyo, Akbayan, then a coalition member of the first Laban ng Masa, was among the opposition groups repressed by the government as the party joined the call for a Transitional Revolutionary Government (TRG). It was also during this time that Akbayan suffered its lowest number of votes, with just over 400,000 votes in 2007.

=== Coalition with the Liberal Party (2009–2016) ===
In 2009, Akbayan supported the candidacy of then Senator Benigno Aquino III of the Liberal Party for the 2010 presidential election. Fueled by the popular discontent with the outgoing administration of Arroyo, Aquino won the presidency by a large margin. This was also the first time that Akbayan was able to breach the one million vote mark, its best performance to that date. Despite the vote increase, however, it failed to secure three seats in the House owing to a Supreme Court decision which ensured only the leading party list (Ako Bicol at that time) in the election would secure three seats. Aquino later appointed several Akbayan members to his cabinet.

However, the party's alliance with the Liberal-led Aquino administration led to tensions with the Makabayan bloc, a national democratic left-wing coalition in Congress. In 2012, members of Anakbayan, the bloc's youth organization, barged inside a press conference of Akbayan, branding it a "fake partylist" because some of its leaders, including Ronald Llamas, were appointed into top government positions. Several groups affiliated with Makabayan also filed a disqualification notice against the party for their alliance with the administration. Akbayan, in return, sought the disqualification notice against party-lists affiliated with the Makabayan bloc for allegedly being a front of the Communist Party of the Philippines (CPP). During the 2013 senatorial election, Bayan Muna representative Teodoro Casiño, the sole senatorial candidate of the Makabayan bloc, criticized the senatorial bid of Risa Hontiveros, one of its founders and former representatives, who ran as part of the administration Team PNoy slate, saying that she is "too cozy with the administration". Hontiveros criticized Casiño for his silence on abuses committed by the CPP-affiliated New People's Army. In 2014, as the Makabayan bloc filed an impeachment complaint against Aquino, Renato Reyes Jr., the secretary-general of BAYAN, criticized the party, branding them as a "yellow cheerleader", referencing the color of the ruling Liberals. In 2015, Walden Bello, one of the party's representatives in the House, resigned over the party's continued support of the administration despite several policy disagreements and the Mamasapano clash. He was subsequently replaced by Angelina Katoh.

In 2016, the party again allied itself with the Liberal Party to form the Koalisyon ng Daang Matuwid, supporting Mar Roxas and Leni Robredo's campaigns for the presidential and vice presidential elections. Although Roxas lost to then-Davao City Mayor Rodrigo Duterte while Robredo narrowly won the vice presidential race, the party entered the Senate with Hontiveros's victory following her third attempt to run, ranking ninth in the official results. However, they lost one seat in the party-list race after their percentage dropped to below the two percent threshold for an additional seat.

=== Opposition (2016–present) ===
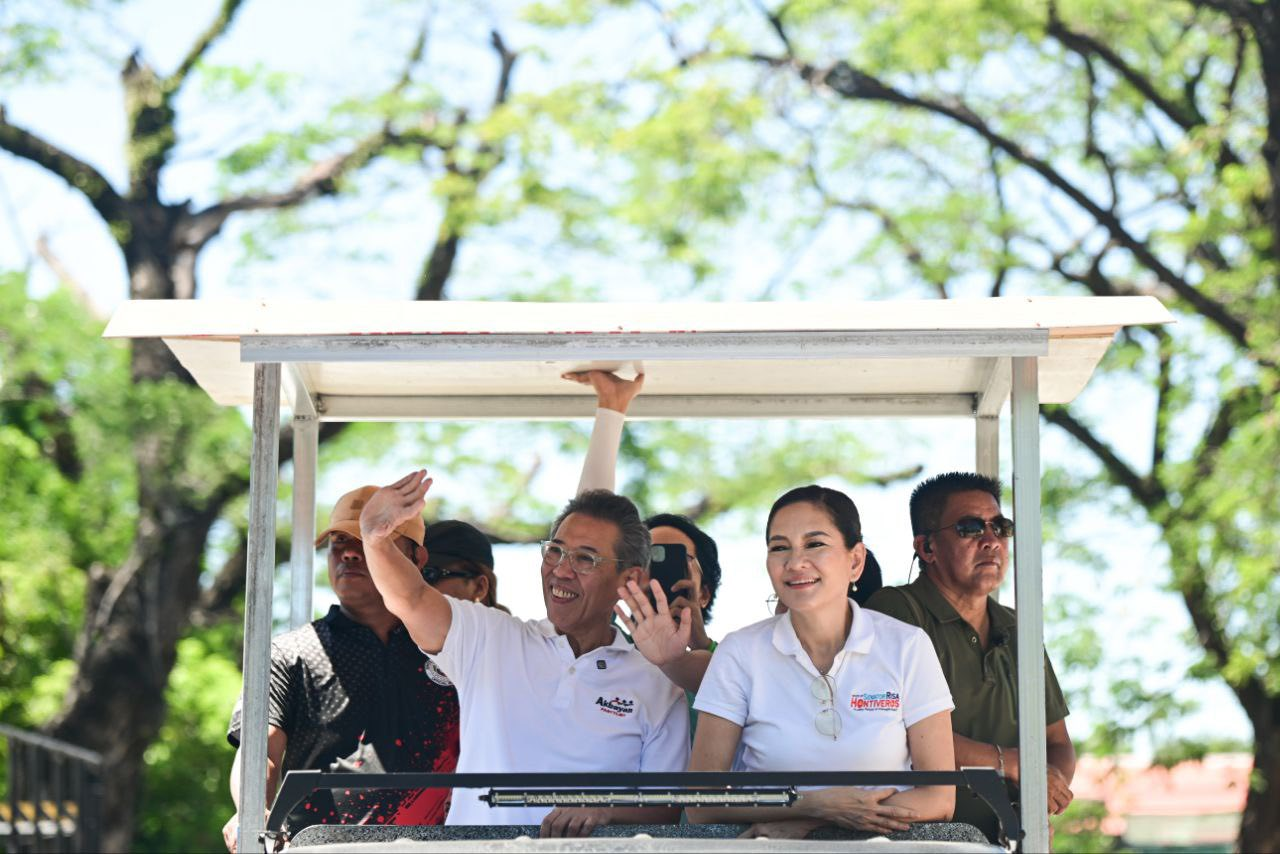
Chel Diokno (left) and Risa Hontiveros (right) during a campaign motorcade in Dagupan, 2025.

After the 2016 election, it joined the Magnificent 7, a group of Liberal Party and Magdalo Party-List members, in the House. In the Senate, Hontiveros initially joined the majority bloc, before she and other senators in opposition to Duterte's policies were relegated to the minority and lost their committee chairmanships. The party publicly criticized several policies of the Duterte administration, including Duterte's handling of the Philippine drug war and the TRAIN Law. In 2019, amid the defeat of several opposition groups, including the Otso Diretso coalition for the Senate election which included Akbayan, the party lost representation in the House.

In the 2022 election, Akbayan backed the candidacies of Leni Robredo and Kiko Pangilinan for president and vice president, respectively, as part of the Team Robredo–Pangilinan (TRoPa) alliance. Although Robredo and Pangilinan were defeated, Hontiveros was re-elected. Akbayan also initially fell one spot short of regaining a seat in the House but later took office after the disqualification of the An Waray party-list. In the 2025 elections, Akbayan nominated lawyer Chel Diokno, who ran for senator in 2022 under the TRoPa ticket, as its first nominee for the party-list election. The party also formed the KiBam coalition alongside the Liberal Party and the Katipunan ng Nagkakaisang Pilipino. The coalition was successful, and the party achieved its highest number of votes and the top vote share in the country, garnering about 2.7 million votes and securing three seats in the House.

== Ideology and platform ==
Akbayan mobilization in front of the Chinese Consular Office to protest China's incursions into the Philippines' Exclusive Economic Zone

A centre-left to left-wing party, Akbayan advocates for participatory democracy and a form of governance it characterizes as participatory socialism. The party includes both democratic socialists and social democrats as members.

The party has affiliate groups that represent government employees, women workers, migrants, as well as members of the LGBT community. The party's official website states that Akbayan is an activist organisation "and proud of it", and that it "vehemently condemn(s) torture, assassination, and other violent acts that undermine human rights and freedoms regardless of whoever commits them".

Akbayan has been critical of abuses committed by some members of the Armed Forces of the Philippines (AFP) against fellow activists. It has also been critical of the Communist Party of the Philippines, particularly its actions in the countryside against peasant groups and communities and what these groups and communities see as the Maoist group's extortion activities. Due to its stance against right-wing extremism (from some elements of the AFP) and the Maoist far-left (CPP–NPA–NDF), Akbayan has been a target of both political groups. Following the killings of Keith and Nolven Absalon, Akbayan criticized the Makabayan bloc's response as being selective in its condemnation of the New People's Army's abuses, with the party called on the Makabayan bloc to denounce all the atrocities and abuses committed by the New People's Army.

=== Foreign policy ===
Akbayan supports an independent foreign policy that prioritizes the Philippines' sovereignty. The party has been noted to oppose the increased incursions of the People's Republic of China (PRC) naval and coast guard vessels into Philippine territorial waters and within the country's 200-nautical mile Exclusive Economic Zone (EEZ). It also opposed the Enhanced Defense Cooperation Agreement, despite being in coalition with the Liberal Party during the Aquino administration which signed the agreement.

== Party leadership ==
=== Current party officials ===
- Party President: Rafaela David
- Party Chairperson: Mylene Hega
- Secretary-General: Jordan Gutierrez
- Party Member: Risa Hontiveros
- Party Member: Chel Diokno
- Party Member: Percival "Perci" Vilar Cendaña
- Party Member: Dadah Kiram Ismula
- Party Member: Ronald Llamas
- Party Member: Barry Gutierrez

=== Party Presidents ===
Ronald Llamas became the founding party president of Akbayan. Rafaela David serves as the current party president.

Name	Tenure
Ronald Llamas	1998-2010
Loretta Ann Rosales	2010-2011
Joel Rocamora	2011-2012
Risa Hontiveros	2012-2015
Machris Cabreros	2015-2021
Rafaela David	2021 - present

== Electoral performance ==
=== Presidential elections ===
Philippine President Benigno Aquino III at Akbayan's Regular Congress on 25 May 2012

Year	Candidate	Votes	%	Result	Outcome
2010	None; endorsed Benigno Aquino III (Liberal)			—N/a	Benigno Aquino III won
2016	None; endorsed Mar Roxas (Liberal)			—N/a	Rodrigo Duterte (PDP–Laban) won
2022	None; endorsed Leni Robredo (Independent)			—N/a	Bongbong Marcos (PFP) won

=== Vice presidential elections ===
Year	Candidate	Votes	%	Result	Outcome
2010	None; endorsed Mar Roxas (Liberal)			—N/a	Jejomar Binay (PDP–Laban) won
2016	None; endorsed Leni Robredo (Liberal)			—N/a	Leni Robredo (Liberal) won
2022	None; endorsed Francis Pangilinan (Liberal)			—N/a	Sara Duterte (Lakas–CMD) won

=== Legislative elections ===
==== Senate ====
In 2010, one of Akbayan's representatives Risa Hontiveros ran for Senate as a member of Liberal Party. Akbayan fully supported her candidacy. Hontiveros lost and placed 13th, one rank near the 12 winning candidates. In 2013, Hontiveros again ran for a Senate seat, formally under Akbayan. She lost again, placing 17th. In the 2016 Senate elections, Hontiveros ran for the third time, and finally won, placing 9th. Hontiveros became the first person in Philippine history from the social democratic and progressive center-left to win a Senate seat. In the 2022 Senate elections, Senator Hontiveros ran for reelection, winning amid the anti-progressive rhetoric of the administration, and placing 11th.

==== House of Representatives elections in districts ====
In 2013, Kaka Bag-ao, a member of the party, ran for the Dinagat Islands seat under the Liberal Party and won. In 2016, she ran for reelection in the Dinagat Islands seat as a Liberal, and won. She was backed by Akbayan as well. In 2025, Bag-ao again ran for the Dinagat Islands seat as a Liberal and won. She was backed by Akbayan and continued to be part of the party.

==== Legislative Results (excluding House party-list representation) ====
Congress of the Philippines
House of Representatives (Districts)					Senate					
Year	Votes	Vote share	Seats won	Result	Year	Votes	Vote share	Seats won	Ticket	Result
1998	Did not participate			Lakas plurality	1998	Did not participate				LAMMP win 7/12 seats
2001	Did not participate			Lakas plurality	2001	Did not participate				People Power win 8/13 seats
2004	Did not participate			Lakas plurality	2004	Did not participate				K4 win 7/12 seats
2007	Did not participate			Lakas plurality	2007	Did not participate				GO win 8/12 seats
2010	Did not participate			Lakas–Kampi plurality	2010	Only supported a candidate (Note: Risa Hontiveros, despite being an Akbayan member, was registered as Liberal in the ballot)				Liberal win 4/12 seats
2013	Did not participate			Liberal plurality	2013	10,944,843	3.68%	0 / 12	Team PNoy	Team PNoy win 9/12 seats
2016	Did not participate			Liberal plurality	2016	15,915,213	4.97%	1 / 12	Daang Matuwid	Daang Matuwid win 7/12 seats
2019	Did not participate			PDP–Laban plurality	2019	Did not participate			Otso Diretso	Hugpong win 9/12 seats
2022	Did not participate			PDP–Laban plurality	2022	15,470,005	3.56%	1 / 12	TroPa	UniTeam win 6/12 seats
2025	Did not participate			Lakas plurality	2025	Did not participate			KiBam	Alyansa win 6/12 seats

==== Party-list elections ====
Akbayan is only one of two parties (the other is Butil) to win seats in all party-list elections in the Philippines until 2019. Furthermore, Akbayan is the only party to surpass the 2% election threshold in all elections until the 2016 election where they fell short by 0.12%.

In September 2024, the COMELEC proclaimed the party as a winner after the Supreme Court of the Philippines upheld the COMELEC resolution which revoked the party-list registration of An Waray.

Election	Votes	%	Secured Seats	Party-List Seats	Congress	1st Representative	2nd Representative	3rd Representative
1998	232,376	2.54%	1 / 3	51	11th Congress; 1998–2001	Etta Rosales	—N/a	—N/a
2001	377,852	2.50%	2 / 3	51	12th Congress; 2001–2004	Etta Rosales	Mario Aguja	—N/a
2004	852,473	6.70%	3 / 3	52	13th Congress; 2004–2007	Etta Rosales	Mario Aguja	Risa Hontiveros
2007	466,112	2.92%	2 / 3	53	14th Congress; 2007–2010	Risa Hontiveros	Walden Bello	—N/a
2010	1,058,691	3.50%	2 / 3	57	15th Congress; 2010–2013	Walden Bello	Kaka Bag-ao	—N/a
2013	827,405	3.02%	2 / 3	58	16th Congress; 2013–2016	Walden Bello (2013–2015 (Note: Resigned on 16 March 2015.))	Barry Gutierrez	—N/a
2013	827,405	3.02%	2 / 3	58	16th Congress; 2013–2016	Angelina Ludovice-Katoh (2015–2016 (Note: Replaced resigned representative Walden Bello and sworn in on 13 May 2015.))	Barry Gutierrez	—N/a
2016	608,449	1.88%	1 / 3	59	17th Congress; 2016–2019	Tom Villarin	—N/a	—N/a
2019	171,713	0.62%	0 / 3	61	18th Congress; 2019–2022	Out of Congress		
2022	236,226	0.64%	1 / 3	63	19th Congress; 2022–2025	Perci Cendaña (2024– (Note: Proclaimed and assumed office on 25 September 2024.))	—N/a	—N/a
2025	2,779,621	6.63%	3 / 3	63	20th Congress; 2025–2028	Chel Diokno	Perci Cendaña	Dadah Kiram Ismula
Note: A party-list group, can win a maximum of three seats in the House of Representatives.

== Candidates ==
=== Candidates for 2013 elections ===
- Risa Hontiveros – Senator
- Arlene "Kaka" Bag-ao – District Representative, Dinagat Islands (under Liberal Party)
- Walden F. Bello – 1st nominee, party-list
- Ibarra "Barry" M. Gutierrez III – 2nd nominee, party-list
- Angelina Ludovice Katoh – 3rd nominee, party-list
- Sylvia Estrada Claudio – 4th nominee, party-list
- Francis Q. Isaac – 5th nominee, party-list
- Edwin A. Bustillos – 6th nominee, party-list

=== Candidates for 2016 elections ===
- Risa Hontiveros – Senator
- Tom Villarin – 1st nominee, party-list
- Barry Gutierrez III – 2nd nominee, party-list (Note: Also the spokesperson of Koalisyon ng Daang Matuwid)
- Angelina Katoh – 3rd nominee, party-list
- Rafaela Mae David – 4th nominee, party-list
- Doris Obena – 5th nominee, party-list
- Mylene Hega – 6th nominee, party-list
- Cenon Nolasco – 7th nominee, party-list

==== Local candidates ====
- Pat Ibay – Councilor (District 1, Pasay)
- Ileana Ibay – Councilor (District 2, Pasay)
- Alvin Dizon – Councilor (District 1, Cebu City) (Note: Ran as a Liberal)
- Sergio Bañes Jr. – Councilor (Estancia, Iloilo)
- Egar Chu – Councilor (Estancia, Iloilo)
- Elaine Teope - Councilor (Luisiana, Laguna)

=== Candidates for 2019 elections ===
- Tom Villarin – 1st nominee, party-list
- Gio Tingson – 2nd nominee, party-list
- Doris Dinorog-Obena – 3rd nominee, party-list
- Angelina Katoh – 4th nominee, party-list
- Napoleon Mérida – 5th nominee, party-list
- Cristina Oganiza – 6th nominee, party-list

=== Candidates for 2022 elections ===
- Risa Hontiveros – Senator
- Percival Cendaña – 1st nominee, party-list
- Raymond John Naguit – 2nd nominee, party-list
- Cristina Oganiza – 3rd nominee, party-list
- Angelina Katoh – 4th nominee, party-list
- JC Tejano – 5th nominee, party-list
- Victoria de Jesus – 6th nominee, party-list

==== Local candidates ====
- Lyn Dialde - Board Member, Dinagat Islands
- Fely Pedrablanca - Mayor, Tubajon, Dinagat Islands
- Rexon Arevalo - Vice Mayor, Nagcarlan, Laguna
- Ernesto Balida - Vice Mayor, Batad, Iloilo
- Petnel Sombrado - Vice Mayor, Dinagat, Dinagat Islands
- Zoltan Edera - Vice Mayor, Libjo, Dinagat Islands
- Liezl Aguirre - Councilor, San Jose del Monte, Bulacan
- Tobit Cruz - Councilor, Taytay, Rizal
- Erwin Dimaculangan - Councilor, Alitagtag, Batangas
- Elaine Teope - Councilor, Luisiana, Laguna
- Laurence Sombilla - Councilor, Nagcarlan, Laguna
- Richard Pavico - Councilor, San Pablo, Laguna
- Gilbert Arrabis Jr. - Councilor, Daanbantayan, Cebu
- Wilfredo Punay - Councilor, Tubajon, Dinagat Islands
- Samson Tidalgo - Councilor, Tubajon, Dinagat Islands

=== Candidates for 2025 elections ===
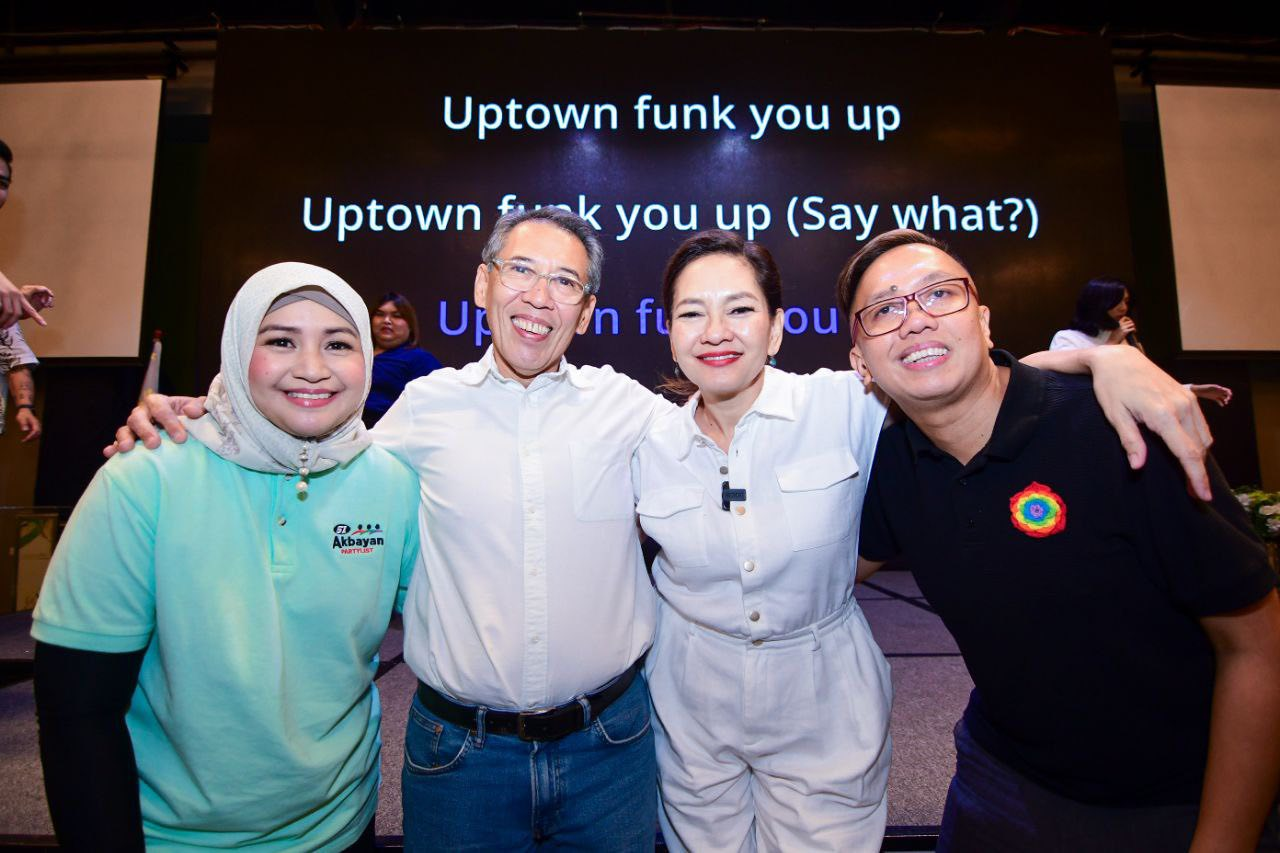
Akbayan nominees Dadah Kiram Ismula (left), Chel Diokno (2nd from left), and Perci Cendaña (right) with Senator Risa Hontiveros (2nd from right) during the victory celebration of Akbayan in Pasig after the 2025 elections.

- Chel Diokno – 1st nominee, party-list
- Percival Cendaña – 2nd nominee, party-list
- Dadah Kiram Ismula – 3rd nominee, party-list
- Justine Balane – 4th nominee, party-list
- Mercy Abucayon – 5th nominee, party-list
- Magdalena Robinson – 6th nominee, party-list
- JC Tejano – 7th nominee, party-list
- Ernesto Neri – 8th nominee, party-list
- Yoyong Mérida – 9th nominee, party-list
- Angelina Katoh – 10th nominee, party-list

==== Local candidates ====
- Lyn Dialde – Board Member, Dinagat Islands
- Sean Eludo – Board Member, Dinagat Islands
- Frans Gelaine Garcia – Board Member, Bohol
- Fely Pedrablanca – Mayor, Tubajon
- Petnel Sombrado – Mayor, Dinagat, Dinagat Islands
- Ogie Suayan – Mayor, Candelaria, Quezon
- Zoltan Edera – Vice Mayor, Libjo
- Bong Maliwanag – Vice Mayor, Candelaria, Quezon
- Zacarias Suplaag – Vice Mayor, Tubajon
- Hazel Omri Abdon – Councilor, Candelaria, Quezon
- Charlott Angeles – Councilor, Jalajala
- Roderick Bacol – Councilor, Tubajon
- Mark Greg Bonaobra – Councilor, Gumaca
- Tobit Cruz – Councilor, Taytay, Rizal
- Divina Custodio – Councilor, Dinagat, Dinagat Islands
- Alvin Dizon – Councilor, Cebu City
- Opan Dizon – Councilor, Candelaria, Quezon
- Abe Diokno – Councilor, Taal, Batangas
- Bong Ebol – Councilor, Dinagat, Dinagat Islands
- Belo Emralino – Councilor, Candelaria, Quezon
- Maila Escamillas – Councilor, Candelaria, Quezon
- Joel Ganado – Councilor, General Mariano Alvarez
- Ken Paolo Giloo – Councilor, Bacolod
- Bebie Ladaga – Councilor, Tubajon
- Nonong Lamoca – Councilor, Candelaria, Quezon
- Edwin Larida – Councilor, Tubajon
- Jun Padullon – Councilor, Tubajon
- Jun Panguito – Councilor, Jalajala
- Nemerlito Perez – Councilor, Dasmariñas
- Almie Recla – Councilor, Tubajon
- Janice Rosales – Councilor, Dinagat, Dinagat Islands
- Paul Senogat – Councilor, Pasig
- Emerson Sio – Councilor, Candelaria, Quezon
- Freddie Subere – Councilor, Tubajon
- Koping Tabogon – Councilor, Dinagat, Dinagat Islands
- Elaine Teope – Councilor, Luisiana
- Samson Tidalgo – Councilor, Tubajon
- Jessica Trajano – Councilor, Tubajon
- Narcing Villaran – Councilor, Jalajala

== Slogans ==
Slogan	English	Date used
'Pag mahal mo, Akbayan mo!	(transl. If you love [someone], give [that someone] the support/pat on the shoulder)	from 2025
Sa Akbayan, Panalo ang Mamamayan!	("With Akbayan, the People Win!")	until 2025
