= Barry Gutierrez =

Filipino politician (born 1974)

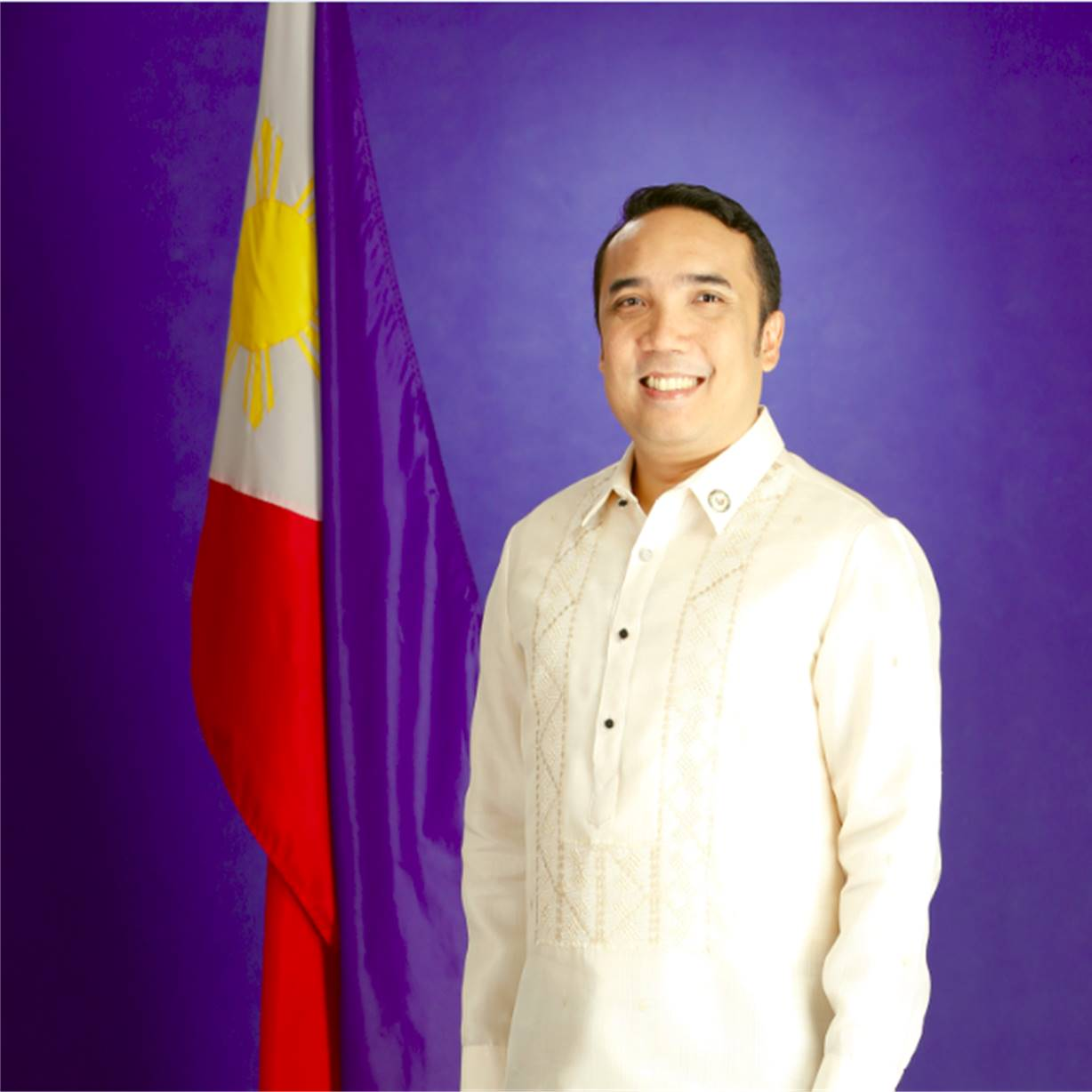

Vice Presidential Spokesperson
- In office June 30, 2016 – June 30, 2022

Member of the Philippine House of Representatives for Akbayan
- In office June 30, 2013 – June 30, 2016 Serving with Walden Bello (2013–2015) and Angelina Ludovice-Katoh (2015–2016)
- Preceded by: Arlene Bag-ao
- Succeeded by: Tomasito Villarin

Undersecretary of the Office of the Presidential Adviser on Political Affairs
- In office 2011–2012

Personal details
- Born: Ibarra M. Gutierrez III; February 2, 1974 (age 52) Quezon City, Philippines
- Party: Akbayan
- Spouse: Ma. Himaya Tamayo
- Education: University of the Philippines Diliman (BS, LL.B); New York University (LL.M)
- Occupation: Lecturer, Activist
- Profession: Lawyer

Ibarra "Barry" M. Gutierrez III (born February 2, 1974) is a Filipino lawyer, activist and educator who formerly served as the spokesperson of then-Vice President Leni Robredo. He is also a law professor at the University of the Philippines College of Law, a public interest and human rights lawyer, and a former congressman.

During his term as Akbayan party-list representative at the Philippine House of Representatives, he introduced 63 bills and resolutions as principal author and co-authored another 128 bills and resolutions. Seven of the bills he principally authored, and nine bills he co-authored, were passed into law.

In recognition of his legislative successes and exemplary public service, Gutierrez was conferred the 2015 "Gawad Lagablab Award," the highest honor given by the Philippine Science High School National Alumni Association to alumni of the school in recognition of outstanding achievements worthy of emulation in their respective fields of endeavor.

== Early life and education ==
Gutierrez was born on February 2, 1974, in Quezon City, Philippines.

=== Education ===
Gutierrez attended the UP Integrated School for basic education and the Philippine Science High School for higher learning. In 1994, he graduated cum laude from the UP School of Economics with a degree in Bachelor of Science in Economics.

=== Entry to law ===
Gutierrez entered the UP College of Law in 1994 and graduated cum laude in 1998. AS a student leader-activist, he served as the Philippine Collegian's editor-in-chief (1996–1997) and introduced a front-page column entitled "Disturbing The Peace." That column, combined with shifts in editorial direction, helped make the paper more attractive and readable to its primary audience—students of UP Diliman.

He was later fielded—and was elected—chairman of the University Student Council, a year after he headed the Collegian. As a result, this distinction made him part of a small group of UP students who were both Collegian editors in chief and university student council chairpersons including lawyer Tristan Katindig and journalist Malou Mangahas.

Upon completion of his law degree, he took the Philippine Bar Examinations and passed, ranking among the Top Five Percent (5%) of the successful examinees.

In 2004, Gutierrez obtained his Master of Laws (LL.M.) in public service law, specializing in international law and economic and social rights, from New York University (NYU), where he studied under a joint scholarship grant from the Fulbright Foundation and the NYU Global Public Service Law Project. While studying, he interned with the Robert F. Kennedy Memorial Center for Human Rights in Washington, D.C., focusing on issues involving economic and social rights.

== Career ==
=== Public interest lawyer and human rights advocate ===
After passing the Bar, Gutierrez was hired as an associate at Sycip, Salazar, Hernandez, and Gatmaitan Law Office, the largest law firm in the Philippines. He quit a few months later after winning an intellectual property infringement case against a couple who ran a small-time retail operation that sold fake T-shirts.

His resignation was triggered when he later saw the couple after the court rendered its verdict. The wife was reportedly leaning on the shoulder of her husband and business partner, asking him, "What will happen to us now that we have no more money to file an appeal?" Gutierrez later confided to friends that the incident prompted him to ask himself whether that was the reason he took up law in the first place.

Gutierrez then joined the Sentro ng Alternatibong Lingap Panlegal-Alternative Legal Assistance Center (SALIGAN-ALAC) from 1999 to 2000, a non-government organization fighting for the rights of the marginalized sectors and local communities towards the empowerment of women, indigenous peoples, farmers and the other basic sectors, and local communities.

In 2001, he joined the Housing and Urban Development Coordinating Council (HUDCC) as Director IV (Chief Legal Counsel and Spokesperson) to help address the dire need of an adequate and sustainable housing for the urban poor and low-income Filipino families.

Since his return in the Philippines upon graduation from NYU, Gutierrez was granted a fellowship by the Global Public Service Law Project to pursue housing rights advocacy and litigation in the country. He has acted as a technical consultant and adviser on numerous initiatives undertaken by government agencies and legislative offices, principally in relation to human rights concerns. He also served as the chief legal counsel for Akbayan since 2004.

Gutierrez has also handled cases before trial courts, administrative tribunals and even the Supreme Court, involving issues such as the freedom of speech and public assembly, suffrage, housing rights, and adequate regulation for public utilities.

Petition vs. the Marcos Interment at the Libingan ng mga Bayani

On August 19, 2016, Gutierrez as Lead Counsel of the human rights victims during the Martial Law field a Petition before the Supreme Court to deny the interment of former dictator Ferdinand E. Marcos at the Libingan ng mga Bayani (LNMB) - a dishonorable act considering that the former dictator was a criminal, plunderer and a human rights violator. On November 8, 2016, the Supreme Court voting 9-5 allowed the burial of Marcos at LNMB on the basis of their claim that they do not have jurisdiction over the case. Speaking on the ruling, Gutierrez expressed his dismay that the Supreme Court chose to seek refuge behind the political question doctrine instead of exercising its power as the arbiter of last resort to ensure that the grave human rights during the dark years of the Marcos regime will not be repeated.

Under secrecy, the Marcoses were able to have the late dictator buried at the LNMB on November 18, 2016, despite the fact that the Supreme Court decision was not supposed to be final and executory until 15 days after its announcement on November 8, 2016. The burial has since sparked a series of protests.

Withdrawal of the Philippines from the Rome Status of the International Criminal Court

On August 29, 2018, Gutierrez acted as counsel for the Petitioner-Senators in the case they filed before the Supreme Court challenging the validity of the Philippines’ withdrawal from the Rome Statute of the International Criminal Court (ICC) in March 2018. The ICC withdrawal came a month after the Prosecutor of the ICC, Fatou Bensouda, opened the Preliminary Examinations into the situations in the Philippines to analyze crimes allegedly committed in the context of the "war on drugs" campaign launched by the Government of the Philippine with many of the reported incidents involving extrajudicial killings in the course of police anti-drug operations.

=== Educator ===
In 2001, Gutierrez joined the UP College of Law faculty as an assistant professor, where he taught courses on Human Rights, Criminal Law, Local Governments, Public Officers and Election Law, and Property Law.

Concurrent with his appointment as a member of the full-time faculty, he also held the position of director of the Institute of Human Rights at the UP Law Center. He is the youngest ever to be appointed to the position.

In 2004, he was granted an appointment as a Visiting Fellow of the Asian Law Institute at the National University of Singapore. His research and teaching interests were International Human Rights Law, International Criminal Law, Property and Housing Law, Criminal Law and Criminal Justice, Economics of Law.

=== Public servant ===
Throughout his professional career, Gutierrez has held key positions in the government such as being the Chief Legal Counsel of HUDCC and as an associate professor at the UP College of Law and director of the Institute of Human Rights at the UP Law Center.

In 2011, he served as Undersecretary in the Office of the Presidential Adviser on Political Affairs (OPA). He resigned a year later after his successful bid within Akbayan, as a nominee for the May 2013 partylist election.

== House of Representatives ==
On July 1, 2013, Gutierrez was sworn into office as a representative of Akbayan Partylist to the House of Representatives of the Philippines for the 16th Congress, and was assigned as Vice Chairperson of two House of Representatives committees: notably, the committees on Human Rights and the Revision of Laws. He is also a member of eight other committees, namely: Housing and Urban Development, Justice, Health, Local Government, Suffrage and Electoral Reforms, Women and Gender Equality, and Ethics and Privileges.

He was a noted champion of several key legislative reform agenda forward, with special focus on transparency, accountability and participative governance. He became a notable advocate of the Freedom of Information (FOI) bill, Zero Hunger Campaign, Socialized and Adequate Housing, the Equal Opportunity Campaign, and Fair Competition.

=== Freedom of information ===
A staunch advocate of the people's right to information, Gutierrez filed the Freedom of Information Bill which seeks to institutionalize greater transparency and accountability in the government to recapture the public trust that has weakened at the onset of the 16th Congress following the uncovering of a multi-billion pork barrel scam, implicating Janet Lim-Napoles in collusion with Senate Minority Leader Juan Ponce Enrile, Senators Jinggoy Estrada and Bong Revilla, also referred to as "Tanda," Sexy" and "Pogi," respectively, and several other congressional representatives in the alleged misuse of the Priority Development Assistance Fund scam amounting to ₱10 billion.

=== Budget reform ===
Gutierrez was among those who for the abolition of the pork barrel system, saying, "[Congress] can no longer shut its eyes to how badly the PDAF has been exploited by the unscrupulous".

He pushed for the adoption of "far-reaching reforms into the budget system" to stem corruption. He also urged the executive to implement a "more sophisticated systems that will make the services more responsive to the needs of the millions of impoverished families all over the country." "Top priority should be transparency and accountability - not only must the government explain to the people how the budget was spent, the people must see for themselves where the money is going and that is only possible through a Freedom of Information law," he said.

The reforms Gutierrez want to introduce to the budget system are 1) institutionalization of people's participation in the budget process, 2) control over the impoundment power of the Executive and 3) reforms in the budget savings and augmentation.

- Budget Reform Bill or House Bill 3128 - The proposed measure seeks to amend or repeal certain provisions of the budget system that heavily favors the executive's discretion in the preparation, authorization, and implementation of the national budget.
- Savings and Augmentation Bill or House Bill No. 2256 - The proposed measure seeks to prevent the unscrupulous practice of realigning so-called savings to dubious allocations.
- Impoundment Control Bill or House Bill 2257 - The proposed measure seeks to regulate the Executive's authority to defer, rescind, and reserve expenditures already approved by Congress.
