= 2021 Nobel Peace Prize =

Award

- Maria Ressa and Dmitry Muratov
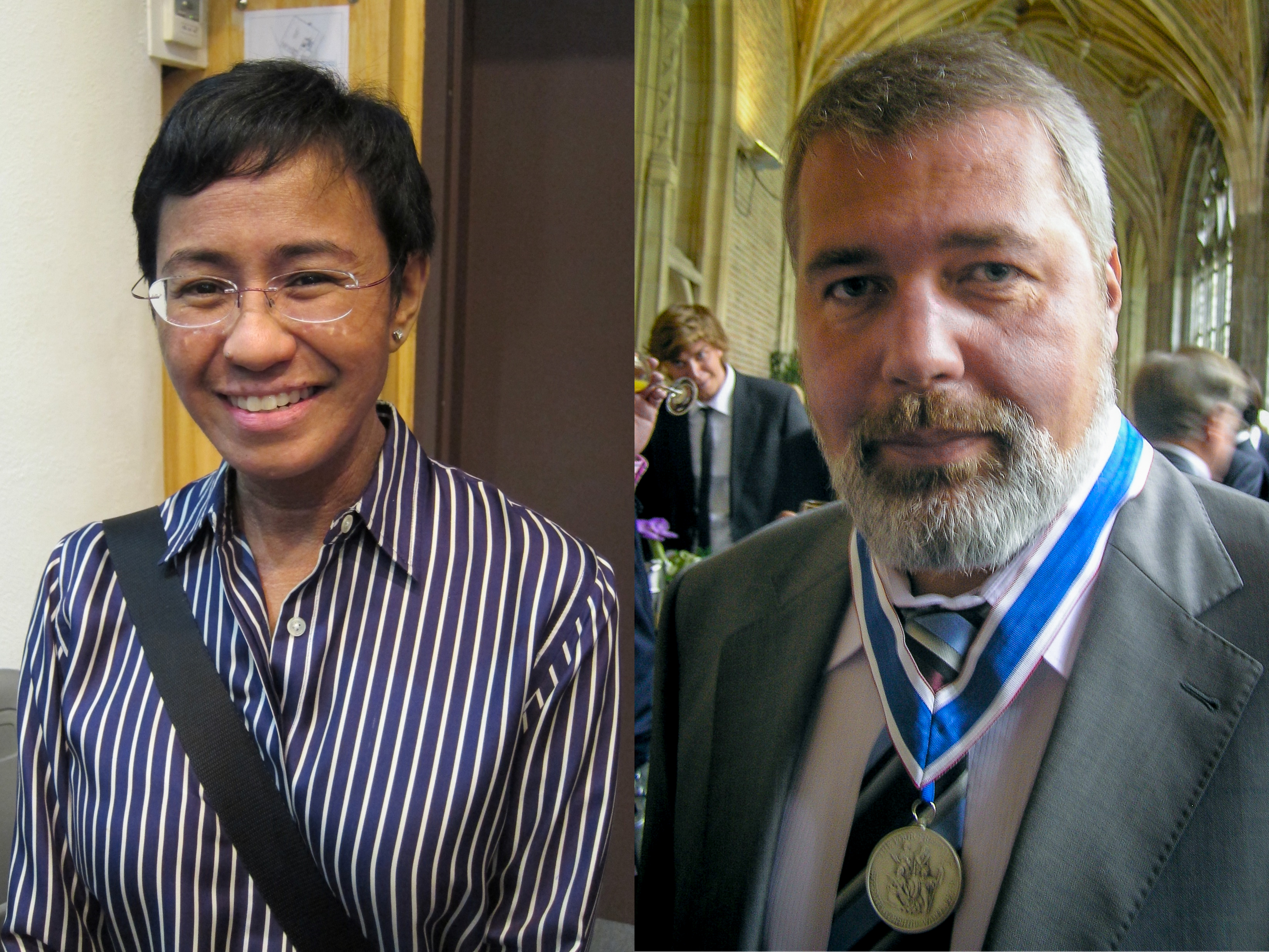
- Ressa (left) and Muratov (right) "for their efforts to safeguard freedom of expression, which is a precondition for democracy and lasting peace."
- Date: 8 October 2021 (announcement by Berit Reiss-Andersen); 10 December 2021 (ceremony)
- Location: Oslo, Norway
- Presented by: Norwegian Nobel Committee
- Reward: 10.0 million SEK
- First award: 1901
- Website: Official website

The 2021 Nobel Peace Prize was announced by the Norwegian Nobel Committee in Oslo on 8 October 2021. Maria Ressa (b. 1963) and Dmitry Muratov (b. 1961) received the prize "for their efforts to safeguard freedom of expression, which is a precondition for democracy and lasting peace."

The formal award ceremony was held in Oslo on 10 December 2021, the anniversary of Alfred Nobel's death. In 2020, the ceremony returned to its former venue, the Atrium of the University of Oslo Faculty of Law, after being held in Oslo City Hall during the period 1990–2019. In 2021, the ceremony returned to Oslo City Hall.

There were 329 candidates for the prize when nominations closed on 31 January 2021. The Norwegian News Agency reported earlier in 2021 that Maria Ressa had been nominated by Jonas Gahr Støre, the designated Prime Minister following the 2021 election, and many sources in Russia claim that Dmitry Muratov was nominated by Mikhail Gorbachev.

== Nobel medal aftermath ==
In June 2022, Muratov sold his medal for 103.5 million dollars. The sum was donated to the UNICEF’s fund for Ukrainian refugee children. This is the highest prize ever paid for a Nobel medal.

== Nomination process ==
Different groups of qualified nominators may nominate candidates, including members of national assemblies and national governments, heads of state, judges of certain international courts, (full) professor-level academics in relevant fields, and former laureates; a significant proportion of the nominations are submitted by Norwegian MPs and academics. Nominations are submitted to the Oslo-based Norwegian Nobel Committee, usually in a Scandinavian language (Norwegian, Swedish, Danish) or English. Nominations for the 2021 prize opened on 1 September 2020 and closed on 31 January 2021 (Norwegian time).

=== Candidates ===
There are 329 candidates in 2021, 234 individuals and 95 organizations. The Nobel Foundation is not allowed to publish nominations for at least 50 years. Individual nominators can, and sometimes do, choose to publish their nomination, and Norwegian media often report nominations by qualified nominators such as members of parliament and qualified academics.

The Norwegian News Agency reported on 31 January 2021 that the 2021 nominees confirmed by qualified Norwegian nominators (MPs or academics) before the deadline included the following candidates:

Nominations confirmed by the various News Agencies
Nominee	Country	Motivations	Nominator(s)	Source
Individuals
Stacey Abrams (b. 1973)	United States	"for her work to promote nonviolent change on voting rights"	Lars Haltbrekken (b. 1971)	
Julian Assange (b. 1971)	Australia	"for their countless examples of courage exposing governments' illegal actions that caused millions of deaths – putting their own freedom and lives on the line"	Mairead Maguire (b. 1944)	
Chelsea Manning (b. 1987)	United States	"for their countless examples of courage exposing governments' illegal actions that caused millions of deaths – putting their own freedom and lives on the line"	Mairead Maguire (b. 1944)	
Edward Snowden (b. 1983)	United States	"for their countless examples of courage exposing governments' illegal actions that caused millions of deaths – putting their own freedom and lives on the line"	Mairead Maguire (b. 1944)	
Avi Berkowitz (b. 1988)	United States	for their role in negotiating four normalisation deals between Israel and Arab nations known as the 'Abraham Accords'."	Lee Zeldin (b. 1980); Alan Dershowitz (b. 1938)	
Jared Kushner (b. 1981)	United States	for their role in negotiating four normalisation deals between Israel and Arab nations known as the 'Abraham Accords'."	Lee Zeldin (b. 1980); Alan Dershowitz (b. 1938)	
Zineb El Rhazoui (b. 1982)	France	"for her fight for freedom of expression and human rights in the face of Islamism"		
Jane Goodall (1934–2025)	United Kingdom	"[with IPBES] for their efforts in the preservation and protection of the environment and wildlife, a contributing factor for world and ecological peace"	Dag Øistein Endsjø (b. 1968)	
Aminatou Haidar (b. 1966)	Western Sahara	"for her peaceful campaign for an independent Western Sahara"		
Martin Lee (b. 1938)	Hong Kong	"for championing greater freedoms and peaceful democracy in Hong Kong"	Mathilde Tybring-Gjedde (b. 1992); Peter Christian Frølich (b. 1987)	
Alexei Navalny (1976–2024)	Russia	"for his efforts for a peaceful democratization of Russia"	Ola Elvestuen (b. 1967)	
Pedro Opeka, C.M. (b. 1948)	Argentina; Madagascar	"for his work among the poor in Madagascar for more than three decades"	Janez Janša (b. 1958)	
Malcolm Ranjith (b. 1947)	Sri Lanka	"for the role he played in ensuring peace in the wake of the horrendous date that befell on the Catholic community in Sri Lanka by the Easter Sunday terror attacks"	Amara Ranaweeara (?)	
Maria Ressa (b. 1963)	Philippines; United States	"for her brave commitments to free expression, human dignity and democratic government in reporting on the authoritarian Duterte administration"	Jonas Gahr Støre (b. 1960)	
Greta Thunberg (b. 2003)	Sweden	"for her pioneering campaign in the fight against climate crises"		
Donald Trump (b. 1946)	United States	"for his role in the normalizing of relations between Israel and the United Arab Emirates"	Christian Tybring-Gjedde (b. 1963); Joe Wilson (b. 1947)	
Veronika Tsepkalo (b. 1972)	Belarus	"for their struggle for fair elections and for inspiring peaceful opposition against the illegitimate regime in Belarus"	Hårek Elvenes (b. 1959); Jette F. Christensen (b. 1983); Geir Toskedal (b. 1954)	
Sviatlana Tsikhanouskaya (b. 1982)	Belarus	"for their struggle for fair elections and for inspiring peaceful opposition against the illegitimate regime in Belarus"	Hårek Elvenes (b. 1959); Jette F. Christensen (b. 1983); Geir Toskedal (b. 1954)	
Maria Kolesnikova (b. 1982)	Belarus	"for their struggle for fair elections and for inspiring peaceful opposition against the illegitimate regime in Belarus"	Hårek Elvenes (b. 1959); Jette F. Christensen (b. 1983); Geir Toskedal (b. 1954)	
Marilyn Waring (b. 1952)	New Zealand	"for her pioneering work on women, the environment and economics, and peace activism, contributing to the advancement of human and planetary justice and wellbeing"	Margunn Bjørnholt (b. 1958)	
Organizations
Black Lives Matter (founded in 2013)	United States	"for their struggle against racism and racially motivated violence"	Petter Eide (b. 1959)	
Campaign Against Arms Trade (CAAT) (founded in 1974)	United Kingdom	"for their work during and after the two world wars to feed starving children and help Europe rebuild itself"	American Friends Service Committee	
Mwatana for Human Rights (founded in 2007)	Yemen	"for their work during and after the two world wars to feed starving children and help Europe rebuild itself"	American Friends Service Committee	
Campaign to Stop Killer Robots (founded in 2013)	Switzerland	"for its tireless campaign against the use of lethal autonomous weapons"	Audun Lysbakken (b. 1977)	
Coalition for Epidemic Preparedness Innovations (CEPI) (founded in 2017)	Switzerland	"for their work related to the COVID-19 vaccines"	Carl-Erik Grimstad (b. 1952)	
Gavi, The Vaccine Alliance (founded in 2000)	Switzerland	"for their work related to the COVID-19 vaccines"	Carl-Erik Grimstad (b. 1952)	
Committee to Protect Journalists (founded in 1981)	United States	"for promoting media freedom and protecting journalists around the world"	Sveinung Stensland (b. 1972)	
Reporters Without Borders (founded in 1985)	France	"for promoting media freedom and protecting journalists around the world"	Sveinung Stensland (b. 1972)	
Henry Reeve Brigade (founded in 2005)	Cuba	"for their altruistic work carried out in 2020 to save more than 10,000 patients who contracted the COVID-19 virus in 38 foreign countries and to serve another 355,000 people affected by the pandemic"	Krasae Chanawongse (b. 1934); John O'Dowd (b. 1967) (Note: With John Kirk (?) of Canada, Antonio Paris (?) of the Philippines, the Government of South Africa, Government of Namibia, the Government of St Vincent and the Grenadines, 51 parliamentarians, and others)	
Hong Kong Free Press (founded in 2015)	Hong Kong	"for its efforts to report on the China's trampling of democracy and silencing the stories of pro-democracy activists in Hong Kong"	Ola Elvestuen (b. 1967); Terje Breivik (b. 1965); Jon Gunnes (b. 1956)	
Hong Kong Pro-Democracy Movement	Hong Kong	"in honor of their bravery and determination of peacefully expressing their political views that have inspired the world"	Jim McGovern (b. 1959); Marco Rubio (b. 1971)	
Hungarian Helsinki Committee (founded in 1989)	Hungary	"for their efforts to protect human dignity and the rule of law through legal intervention and public advocacy"	Jette F. Christensen (b. 1983)	
IUSTITIA - Polish Judges Association (founded in 1990)	Poland	"for their efforts to protect human dignity and the rule of law through legal intervention and public advocacy"	Jette F. Christensen (b. 1983)	
Intergovernmental Science-Policy Platform on Biodiversity and Ecosystem Services (IPBES) (founded in 2012)	United Nations	"[with Goodall] for their efforts in the preservation and protection of the environment and wildlife, a contributing factor for world and ecological peace"	Dag Øistein Endsjø (b. 1968)	
International Fact-Checking Network (founded in 2015)	United States	"for working to promote higher standards in fact-checking and to advocate for reliable information"	Trine Skei Grande (b. 1969); Tore Storehaug (b. 1992)	
North Atlantic Treaty Organization (NATO) (founded in 1949)	Belgium	"for its actions to prevent further tensions from flaring between the West and Russia over Ukraine"	Erlend Wiborg (b. 1984)	
Scout movement (established in 1908)	United Kingdom	"in recognition for the outstanding contributions of Scouting and Guiding that have empowered hundreds of millions of young people to create a lasting culture of peace in their communities for more than a century	Solveig Schytz (b. 1976)	

== Laureates ==
On 8 October 2021, the Norwegian Nobel Committee announced its decision to award the prize to journalists Maria Ressa and Dmitry Muratov "for their efforts to safeguard freedom of expression, which is a precondition for democracy and lasting peace." As a result, the Nobel Prize Committee was criticized for rewarding Muratov and not jailed Russian opposition leader Alexei Navalny, as an attempt by the Committee "to keep the maximum distance from the current political process" in Russia. Muratov has said that he would have given the prize to Alexei Navalny if it were his choice.

During his acceptance speech, at a time when Russia began a major military build-up near the Russia–Ukraine border, Muratov warned that "In [the] heads of some crazy geopoliticians, a war between Russia and Ukraine is not something impossible any longer." In April 2022, the U.S. government assessed that Russian intelligence was behind an attack on Dmitry Muratov for criticizing the Russian invasion of Ukraine.

On 22 March 2022, Muratov decided to sell his Nobel Peace Prize medal to an auction, donating the proceeds to UNICEF for the benefit of refugees from Ukraine. The medal sold for $103.5 million, the highest price ever recorded for a Nobel medal.

== Prize committee ==
The members of the Norwegian Nobel Committee are elected by the Norwegian Parliament and are responsible for selecting the laureate in accordance with the will of Alfred Nobel; the committee's members in 2021 are:

- Berit Reiss-Andersen (chair, born 1954), advocate (barrister) and former President of the Norwegian Bar Association, former state secretary for the Minister of Justice and the Police (representing the Labour Party). Member of the Norwegian Nobel Committee since 2012, reappointed for the period 2018–2023.
- Asle Toje (vice chair, born 1974), foreign policy scholar. Appointed for the period 2018–2023.
- Anne Enger (born 1949), former Leader of the Centre Party and Minister of Culture. Member since 2018, reappointed for the period 2021–2026.
- Kristin Clemet (born 1957), former Minister of Government Administration and Labour and Minister of Education and Research. Appointed for the period 2021–2026.
- Jørgen Watne Frydnes (born 1984), former board member of Médecins Sans Frontières Norway, board member of the Norwegian Helsinki Committee. Appointed for the period 2021–2026.

== Prize ceremony ==
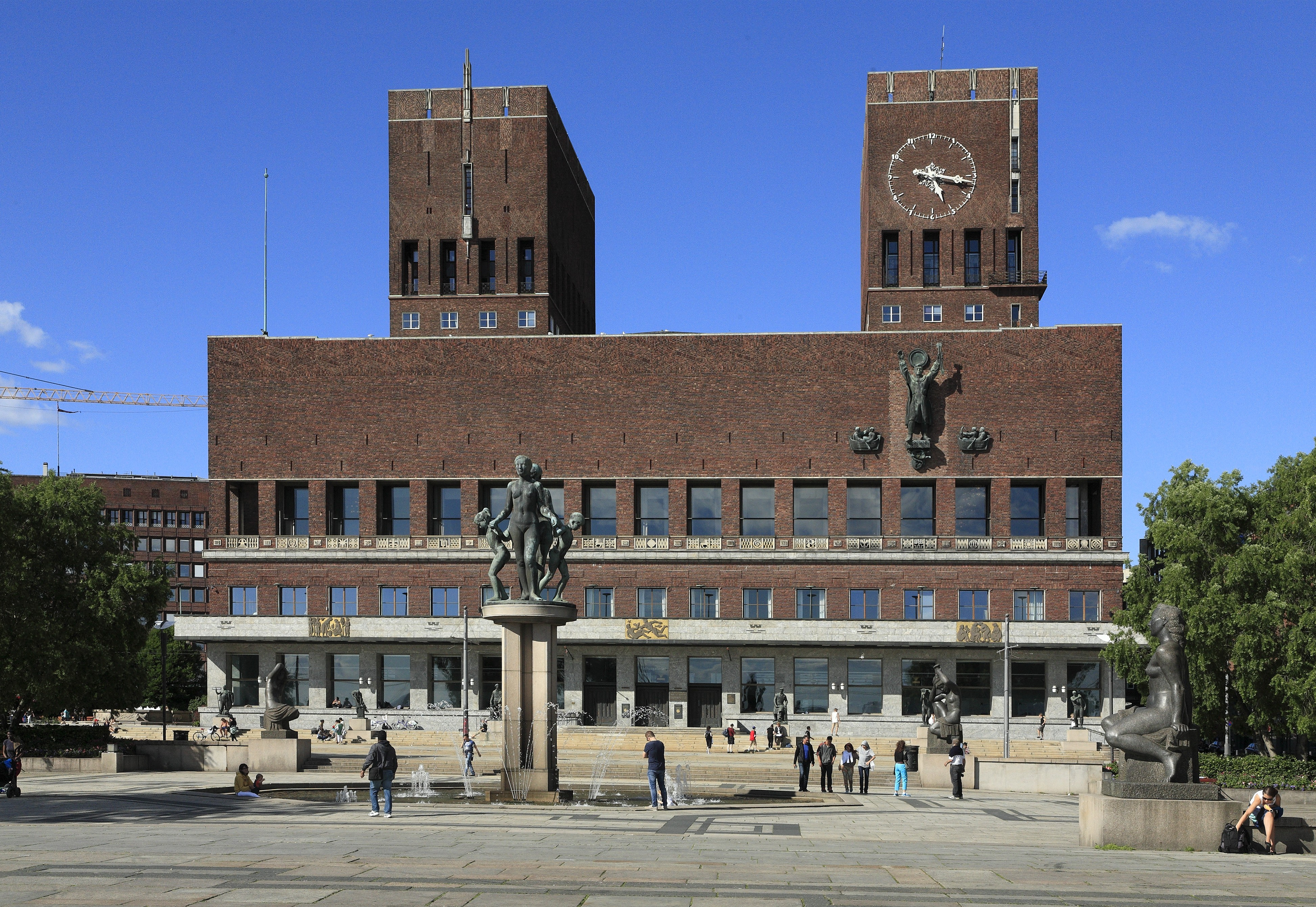
Oslo City Hall, the venue for the 2021 award ceremony

The award ceremony was held in Oslo on 10 December 2021, the anniversary of Alfred Nobel's death. In 2020 the ceremony returned to its former venue, the Atrium of the University of Oslo Faculty of Law, after being held in Oslo City Hall during the period 1990–2019. In 2021 the ceremony was once again held in Oslo City Hall.
