= People of the Philippines v. Santos, Ressa and Rappler =

Philippine criminal cases against news company head

- Court: Manila Regional Trial Court
- Branch: 46

Full case name
- People of the Philippines v. Reynaldo Santos, Jr., Maria Angelita Ressa and Rappler, Inc.
- Decided: June 15, 2020
- Citation: R-MNL-19-01141-CR

Case history
- Prior action(s): NBI and Keng v. Santos et al. (XVI-INV-18C-00049)
- Related action(s): Alleged ownership irregularities: Securities and Exchange Commission: In re: Rappler Inc. and Rappler Holdings Corporation (SP Case No. 08-17-001); Court of Appeals: Rappler Inc. v. SEC (CA-G.R. SP No. 154292); Pasig City RTC Branch 265: People of the Philippines v. Maria Ressa (R-PSG-19-00737-CR); Alleged defamation: Manila RTC Branch 46: People of the Philippines v. Santos, Ressa and Rappler (R-MNL-19-01141-CR); Alleged tax evasion: Pasig City RTC Branch 165: People of the Philippines v. Rappler Holdings Corp. (R-PSG-18-02983-CR); Court of Tax Appeals: People of the Philippines v. Rappler Holdings Corp. and Maria Ressa (Crim. Case No. O-679)

Ruling
- Ponente: Rainelda Estacio-Montesa
- Maria Ressa was found guilty of cyberlibel, and the Court found that a guilty verdict in her case would not unduly harm the right to free expression in the Philippines.

Laws applied
- Cybercrime Prevention Act of 2012; Constitution of the Philippines (1987).—Article III Section 4

People of the Philippines v. Santos, Ressa and Rappler (R-MNL-19-01141-CR), also known as the Maria Ressa cyberlibel case, is a high-profile criminal case in the Philippines, lodged against Maria Ressa, co-owner and CEO of Rappler Inc. Accused of cyberlibel, Ressa was found guilty by a Manila Regional Trial Court on June 15, 2020.

The case centered on an article published on Rappler by Reynaldo Santos Jr. which accused the former Chief Justice of the Supreme Court of the Philippines of accepting favors from Filipino-Chinese businessman Wilfredo Keng. Santos, Ressa, and others were charged with cyberlibel retrospectively, as the article was originally published four months before the Cybercrime Prevention Act came into effect. Rappler Inc., as a corporation, was not found liable; Santos, however, as author, was. Ressa, in her capacity of Rappler's chief executive officer, was also found liable. By the time Santos was charged, he was no longer working as a journalist for Rappler.

The court ruled that Ressa "did not offer a scintilla of proof that they verified the imputations of various crimes in the disputed article ... [Rappler] just simply published them as news in their online publication in reckless disregard of whether they are false or not." The judgement also argued that Ressa had deliberately called herself an executive editor, rather than the editor-in-chief, in an attempt to avoid liability. Ressa, along with Santos Jr., appealed to the Court of Appeals after the conviction. However, the court upheld the decision, noting that the article is "defamatory or libelous per se"; a motion for reconsideration was denied by the appellate court, prompting Ressa to elevate the case to the Supreme Court for a judicial review.

The ruling was criticized by several human rights groups and international organizations, with the United Nations High Commissioner of Human Rights describing the case as part of a "pattern of intimidation" against the Philippine press.

== Background ==
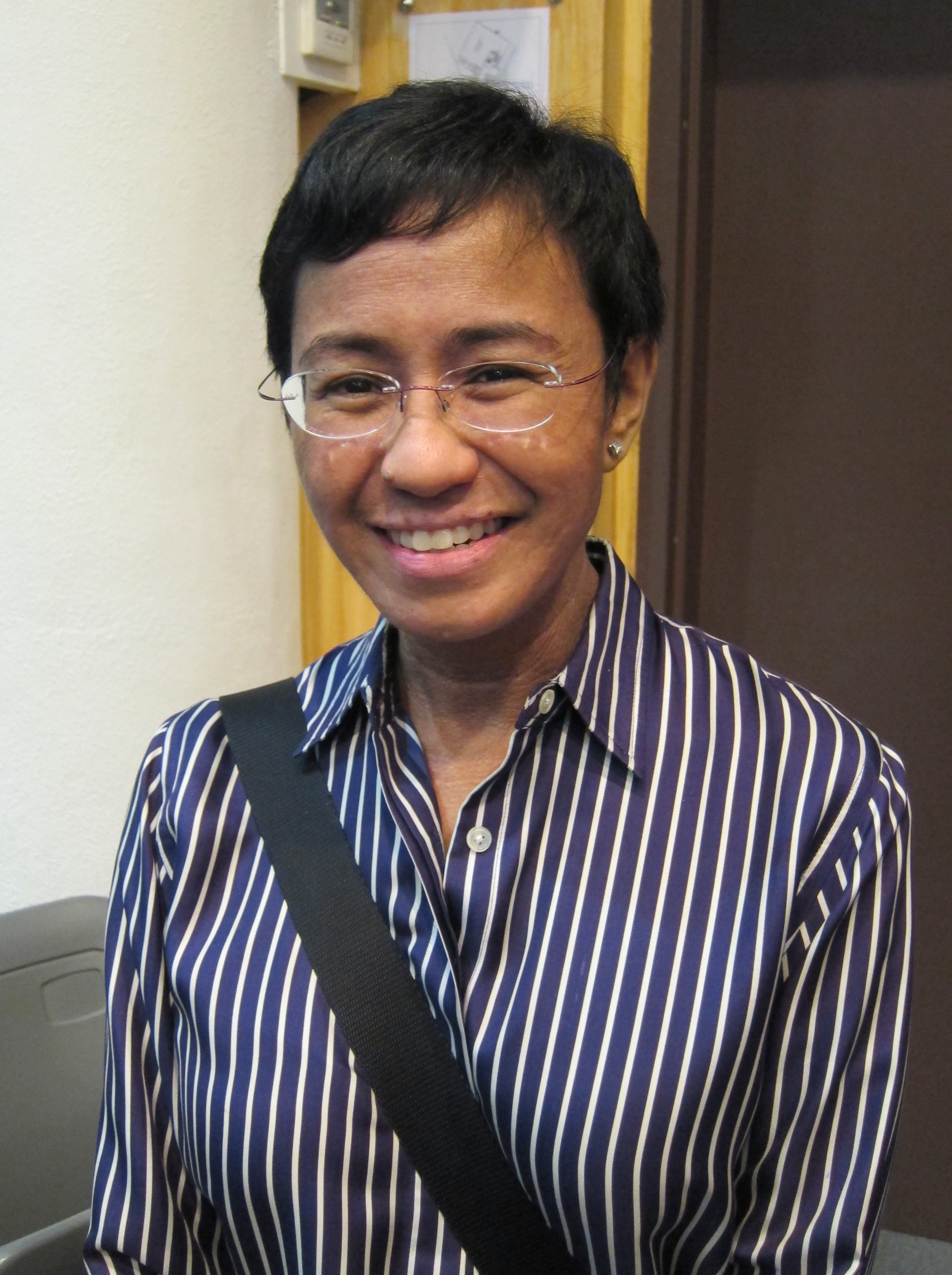
Maria Ressa was one of those found guilty of cyberlibel as a result of People v. Santos, et al.

The Cybercrime Prevention Act of 2012 (R.A. 10175) was signed into law by President Benigno Aquino III on September 12, 2012, becoming effective on October 3. Among the actions criminalized by this law is "cyberlibel". Six days after the law commenced, the Supreme Court issued a temporary restraining order to stop its implementation. On February 18, 2014, the Court declared that the law is constitutional, upholding most of its provisions including cyberlibel.

Rappler is a Filipino news website that was co-founded in 2012 by journalist Maria Ressa. She served as the site's CEO and executive editor since its founding. On May 29, 2012, Rappler researcher and writer Reynaldo Santos Jr. published an article titled "CJ using SUVs of 'controversial' businessmen". Among those named in the article is businessman Wilfredo Keng. The article details Keng's involvement in a controversy surrounding Chief Justice Renato Corona, who was later impeached and convicted. As of August 2025, the article remains online.

Santos Jr.'s article primarily relied on a 2002 Philippine Star article as a source, as well as on an "intelligence report" prepared that same year by the National Security Council, which the article says implicated Keng in human trafficking and drug smuggling. This report, however, was not presented to the Court as evidence. On February 16, 2019, Philippine Star took down the aforementioned article after Keng threatened legal action.

On December 20, 2017, Keng filed a complaint-affidavit before the National Bureau of Investigation (NBI) to charge Santos, Jr. and Ressa, along with Rappler's treasurer James Bitanga and six others, with cyberlibel. The NBI's Cybercrime Department argued that because of a legal gray area regarding the theory of "continuous publication", (Note: The theory is based on the idea that, as long as the article is online, the server (in this case, Rappler) was "publishing" it again whenever it was accessed by someone, akin to print-on-demand for printed works.) it can be assumed that Keng saw the article in question after the passing of the law. However, the NBI ultimately decided not to charge Rappler. The Department of Justice (DOJ) later took up the case and recommended the charges be filed. The DOJ reasoned that on February 19, 2014, the article was changed to correct a misspelling of the word "evasion", (Note: The misspelling is evation.) which can be considered as re-publication according to the department.

Another issue that the DOJ opined on was the prescriptive period. In Philippine law, a regular libel has a prescriptive period of one year, but the cybercrime law does not define such period for cyberlibel. Therefore, the DOJ reasoned that it must be twelve years, according to an American-era law that is still in effect today. While there was a temporary restraining order against implementation of the cybercrime law, the 2014 ruling by the Supreme Court made the law go into effect as scheduled on October 3, 2012. The DOJ later dropped Bitanga and six others from the complaint, as their "part in the publication [had not been] established".

Ressa was arrested on the night of February 13, 2019; she spent the night in jail before being released on bail the next morning. She alleged that she was purposely arrested at night so that she could not bail herself out in a timely manner. As of March 2019, she has paid more than ₱2 million in bail and travel bonds, the latter of which Ressa's camp labeled as "excessive". She could potentially serve around 100 years in prison if she was to be found guilty on all cases.

Aside from People v. Santos, et al., Rappler also faced a number of lawsuits filed by various government agencies, including on the irregularities on its ownership as well as allegations of tax evasion. Ressa on multiple occasions had connected President Rodrigo Duterte to the legal cases filed the executive branch against Rappler.

== Trial ==
Ressa and Santos Jr. were arraigned on May 13, 2019. Their trial began on July 23, 2019. They were represented by lawyers Ted Te and J.J. Disini of the FLAG.

In the lead-up to the trial, the defendants' lawyers tried several times to achieve dismissal via motions to quash in February 2019, motions to dismiss in April 2019, and demurrers in November 2019. All such motions were denied by the Court.

The verdict was originally scheduled for April 3, 2020, but it was delayed due to the COVID-19 pandemic. On the advice of counsel, neither Ressa nor Santos Jr. testified in their own defense.

=== Verdict ===
After a trial that lasted for eight months, Ressa and Santos Jr. were both found guilty of cyberlibel by Judge Rainelda Estacio-Montesa of the Manila Regional Trial Court Branch 46. The verdict was handed down on June 15, 2020. Although corporate liability against Rappler Inc. had been sought, the judge ruled that there was no corporate liability in this case. They were both sentenced to between six months and six years in prison, but are entitled to bail while they have appeals pending in higher courts. They were also both assessed fines of ₱400,000 for combined "moral damages" and "exemplary damages".

In its ruling, the Court said that Ressa "did not offer a scintilla of proof that they verified the imputations of various crimes in the disputed article. [...] They just simply published them as news in their online publication in reckless disregard of whether they are false or not"; it also said that Ressa committed a "clever ruse" by not calling herself an editor-in-chief, but rather an executive editor, to avoid libel liability; this was criticized by several media outlets, as the position is common.

The Court also drew an adverse inference from Ressa and Santos Jr.'s refusal to testify, relying on People v. Resano (G.R. No. L-57738) as precedent, which states that defendants "owe it to themselves" to testify if they are "in the best position to refute [the] charges" as there may be no other way to affect "the complete destruction of the prosecution's prima facie case".

The ruling was handed down in person, despite the ongoing COVID-19 pandemic and general community quarantine. Judge Estacio-Montesa ordered her clerk to first read out her fallo, which read in part, "there is no curtailment of the right to freedom of speech and of the press", before the Court's ruling.

== Appeal ==
Ressa appealed the guilty verdict both on her own behalf and of Santos Jr., who Rappler Inc. is covering the legal costs of. When the Court of Appeals upheld the verdict, she filed a motion for reconsideration arguing that the appellate court "erred in holding that the offense of cyberlibel against appellants has not prescribed and that the period of prescription should be 15 years and not one year," considering that the Revised Penal Code already provides a one-year prescriptive period for "libel and other offenses". In an October 2022 decision, the court denied the motion due to a lack of merit, affirming the conviction and increasing the potential prison sentence accompanying it. Ressa has appealed by certiorari to the Supreme Court.

=== Intervention ===
In a resolution in January 2024, the Supreme Court of the Philippines First Division granted UN special rapporteur Irene Khan's motion for leave to intervene as an amicus curiae to the appeal, granting Khan to appear as an expert together with an amicus brief. The brief alleges that the law of the country failed to protect the right to freedom of expression, citing Article 19 of the International Covenant on Civil and Political Rights to which the Philippines is a member, further raising "serious concerns that it limits the ability of journalists to expose, document and address issues of important public interest, thereby violating the right to receive and impart information." The International Bar Association's Human Rights Institute was also permitted to submit its legal opinion “by way of special appearance”.

== People of the Philippines v. Ressa ==
After the verdict, Keng sued Ressa again for cyberlibel, this time over a tweet she wrote on February 15, 2019, which contained a screenshot of the 2002 Philippine Star article discussed in the 2012 Rappler article. Keng stated that by republishing the article, "[Ressa] feloniously communicated the malicious imputations against me not only to her 350,000 Twitter followers, but to anyone who has access to the internet."

This second case, directed only against Ressa, was filed on November 23, 2020 at Makati RTC Branch 147. The case was withdrawn by Keng on June 1, 2021, to "dedicate time and resources to support ongoing efforts to battle the pandemic". Although Keng did not request a criminal dismissal, judge Andres Soriano still dismissed the case, reasoning that "the public prosecutor manifested that with the private complainant turning hostile to the cause of the prosecution, the prosecution can no longer prove the guilt of the accused beyond reasonable doubt."

This case does not affect the original guilty verdict under appeal.

== Reactions ==
Reaction to the case was mixed. Before the verdict in April 2020, the annual Press Freedom Index report by Reporters Without Borders ranked the Philippines 136 out of 180 countries in terms of press freedom. Historically, since the end of martial law under Ferdinand Marcos, the Philippines was regarded as having one of the most free presses in Asia. People v. Santos, et al. is one of multiple legal cases filed by various government agencies against Rappler. Collectively, these have been described by The Guardian and Reporters Without Borders as "judicial harassment".

Vice President Leni Robredo, the leader of the opposition, argued that the verdict was intended as an instruction to the opposition to "keep quiet". Hillary Clinton echoed a similar sentiment; while Madeleine Albright said she "stands with Maria Ressa". The National Union of Journalists of the Philippines (NUJP) declared that the verdict "basically kills freedom of speech and of the press" and has led to a "dark day ... for all Filipinos." J.J. Disini, who represented Ressa and Santos during the trial, criticized the verdict.

The United Nations High Commissioner of Human Rights suggested that the case was part of a "pattern of intimidation" against the Philippine press, while Amnesty International called on the judiciary to "quash" the cases, as did Human Rights Watch. A group of United States senators called the verdict a "travesty of justice" that "set dangerous precedents". The European External Action Service commented that the verdict "raises serious doubts over the respect for freedom of expression as well as for the rule of law in the Philippines." This sentiment was echoed by United Nations special rapporteur David Kaye. The United States Department of State's response expressed "concern" over the verdict, to which the Malacañang reacted negatively, warning of another possible "setback" in diplomatic relations if the State Department continued to interfere.

Spokesperson Harry Roque suggested the law was passed under the previous administration. Roque had previously been a petitioner in Disini v. Sec'y of Justice which attempted to have cyberlibel removed as an offence. Roque also emphasized that the prosecution of Rappler is not politically motivated, and has urged people to respect the ruling. He has also argued that in 2008, Duterte, the mayor of Davao at that time, had helped a journalist jailed on a libel charge, and that Duterte does not prosecute journalists who make accusations against him. Roque also stated that Duterte's appointment of Keng's daughter as a member of the Philippine Commission on Women on September 19, 2019, did not affect the integrity of the verdict against Ressa.

== See also ==
- ABS-CBN franchise renewal controversy
