= Romraflo Taojo =

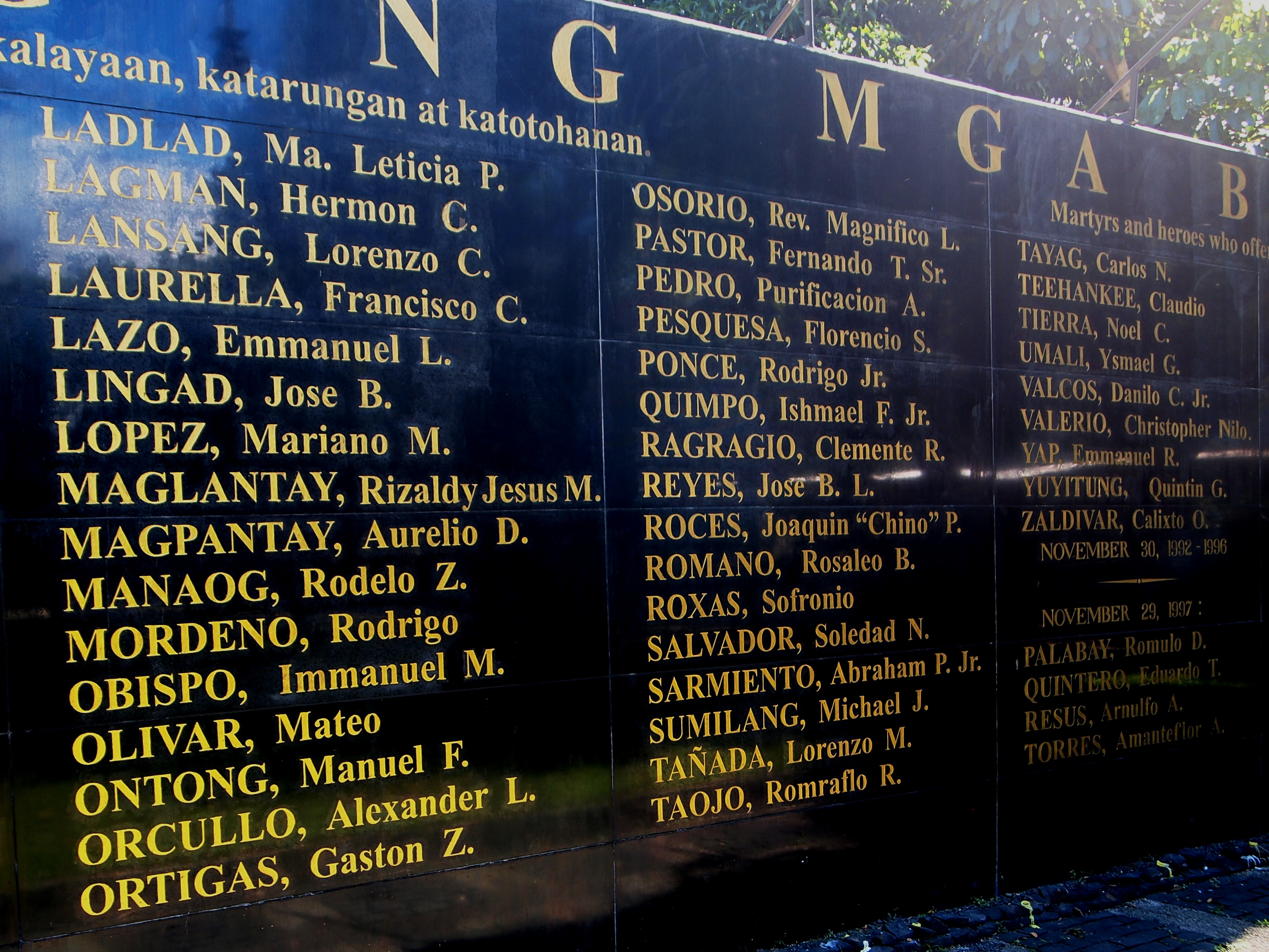
- Detail of the Wall of Remembrance at the Bantayog ng mga Bayani, showing names from the first batch of Bantayog Honorees, including that of Romraflo Taojo.
- Born: Romraflo Rosaroso Taojo; February 4, 1955; Daang Bantayan, Cebu
- Died: April 2, 1985 (aged 30); Tagum, Davao del Norte
- Other name: Dodong Taojo
- Education: University of Mindanao; University of the Visayas
- Parent(s): Romeo Taojo; Isidra Rosaroso

Romraflo R. Taojo (February 4, 1955 - April 2, 1985) was a Filipino labor and human rights lawyer, activist, and educator best known for his work with the Free Legal Assistance Group, where he pursued human rights cases against military personnel who were implicated in torture cases. He was killed on April 2, 1985, when unidentified gunman entered his apartment in Tagum, Davao Del Norte, and shot him five times in the eyes and mouth. The gunmen were believed to be part of a paramilitary group acting on orders from the military.

In 1992, Taojo was one of the first "65 martyrs" honored by having his name inscribed on the wall of remembrance at the Philippines' Bantayog ng mga Bayani, which recognizes heroes and martyrs who fought against Ferdinand Marcos and his martial law regime.

== Life and career ==
Taojo was born to a poor couple from Cebu who later migrated to Mindanao. He passed the bar in 1980, after which he began work as a human rights lawyer. In 1981, he became the first chair of the Integrated Bar of the Philippines' Davao Del Norte chapter and established its first human rights committee.

He provided legal services for free to indigent clients, many of whom were farmers, laborers, or victims of human rights violations. Some were members of Indigenous communities, including victims of land grabbing and military atrocities under the Marcos dictatorship.

Taojo specialized in labor law and represented the Solidarity of Workers of Davao. In October 1984, he headed a panel of negotiators for striking laborers at a large banana plantation. Some of the laborers' demands were met as a result of the negotiations.
