= Maria Ressa =

Filipino and American journalist (born 1963)

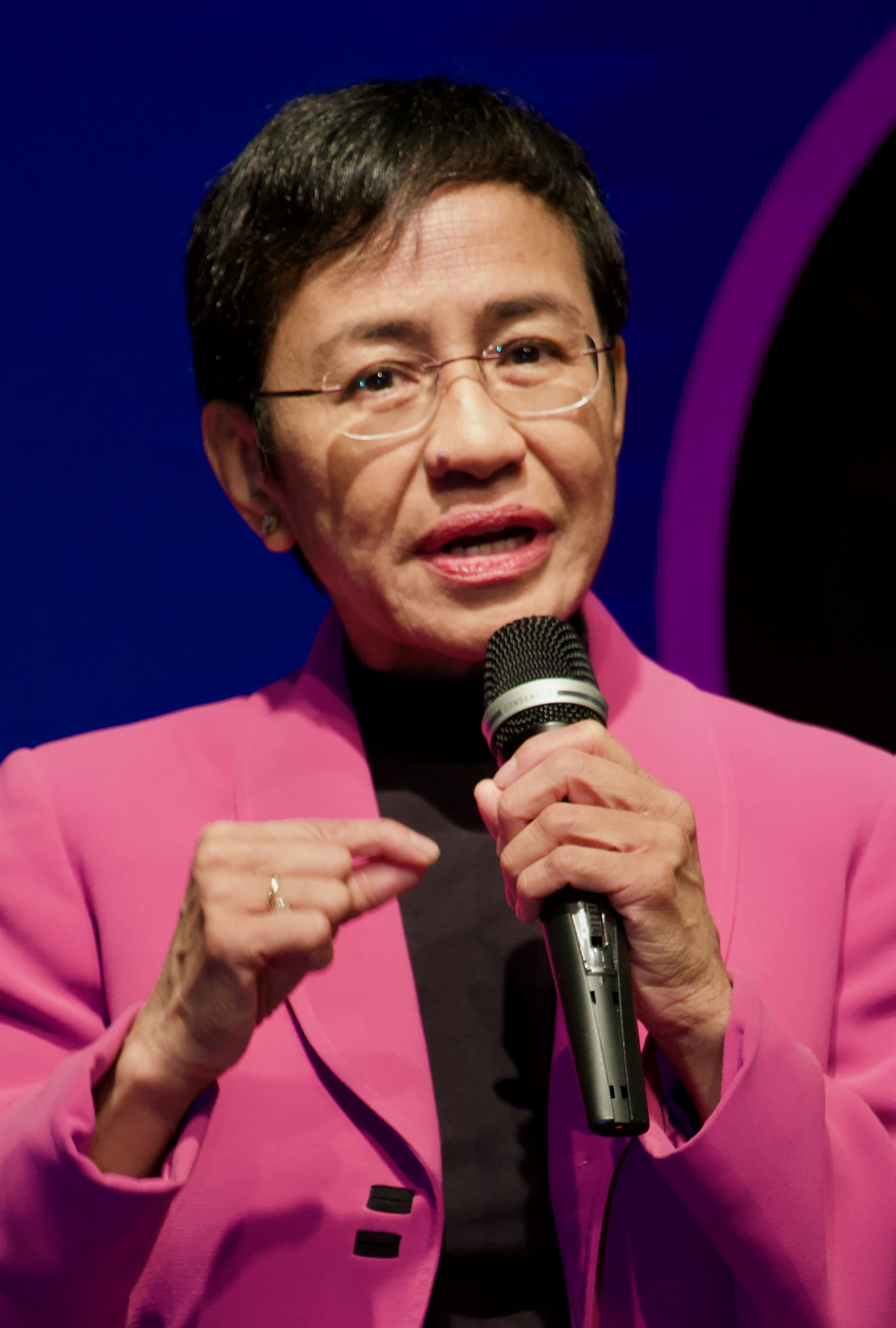
- Ressa in 2025
- Born: Maria Angelita Delfin Aycardo; October 2, 1963 (age 63); Manila, Philippines
- Citizenship: Philippines; U.S.
- Education: Princeton University (BA); University of the Philippines Diliman
- Occupations: Journalist; author
- Known for: Co-founding Rappler

Maria Angelita Ressa (Tagalog pronunciation: [ˈɾesa]; born Maria Angelita Delfin Aycardo; born October 2, 1963) is a Filipino and American journalist and Nobel Peace Prize laureate. She is the co-founder and CEO of Rappler. She previously spent nearly two decades working as a lead investigative reporter in Southeast Asia for CNN. She has been a distinguished fellow at Columbia University's new Institute of Global Politics since 2023 and a professor of professional practice in Columbia's School of International and Public Affairs since July 2024.

Ressa was born in Manila and raised in Toms River, New Jersey. She was included in Time's Person of the Year 2018 issue featuring a collection of journalists from around the world actively combatting fake news. On February 13, 2019, she was arrested by Philippine authorities for cyberlibel due to accusations that Rappler published a false news story concerning businessman Wilfredo Keng. On June 15, 2020, a court in Manila found her guilty of cyberlibel under the controversial Anti-Cybercrime law, a move condemned by human rights groups and journalists as an attack on press freedom. As a prominent critic of the then Philippine president Rodrigo Duterte, her arrest and conviction were seen by many in the opposition and the international community as a politically motivated act. Ressa is one of the 25 leading figures on the Information and Democracy Commission launched by Reporters Without Borders. She was awarded the 2021 Nobel Peace Prize jointly with Dmitry Muratov for "their efforts to safeguard freedom of expression, which is a precondition for democracy and lasting peace."

== Early life and education ==
Maria Angelita Ressa (originally named Maria Angelita Delfin Aycardo) was born in Manila, Philippines, on October 2, 1963. Ressa's father, Manuel Phil Aycardo III, died when she was one year old. She studied at St. Scholastica's College in Manila. Her mother, Hermelina, then moved to the United States, leaving Ressa and her sister with the paternal grandmother, with occasional visits. Subsequently, her mother married an Italian-American man named Peter Ames Ressa and returned to the Philippines. She brought both of her children to New Jersey when Ressa was 10 years old. Ressa was adopted by her stepfather and she took his last name.

Her parents then relocated to Toms River, New Jersey, where she went to Toms River High School North, a public school. Though she barely spoke English when she moved to New Jersey, she went on to be a three-time president of her high school class and a performer in school plays. The school named its newly renovated auditorium after her in 2021.

Ressa's yearbook profile included her dream to conquer the world. Ressa studied at Princeton University, where she graduated cum laude with a Bachelor of Arts in English and certificates in theater and dance in 1986. Her 77-page-long senior thesis titled "Sagittarius" was an allegorical play about Philippine politics.

She was awarded a Fulbright Fellowship to study political theater at the University of the Philippines Diliman where she also taught several journalism courses as a faculty member.

== Career ==
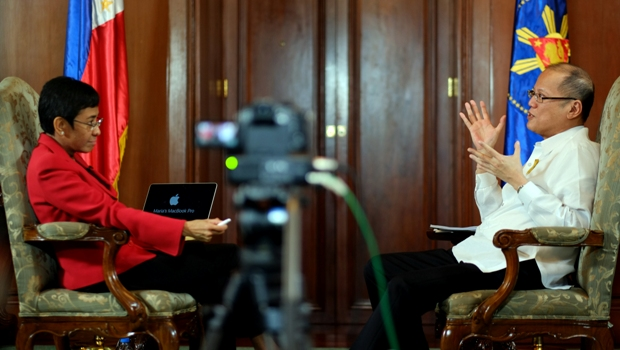
Ressa conducts an interview with former Philippine President Benigno Aquino III at the Music Room of the Malacañang Palace, June 7, 2016

=== Journalism ===
Ressa's first job was at government station PTV 4. She then co-founded independent production company Probe in 1987 and simultaneously served as CNN's bureau chief in Manila until 1995. She then ran CNN's Jakarta bureau from 1995 to 2005. As CNN's lead investigative reporter in Asia for nearly 20 years, she specialized in investigating terrorist networks.

She became an author-in-residence at the International Center for Political Violence and Terrorism Research at Nanyang Technological University's S. Rajaratnam School of International Studies in Singapore for eight months.

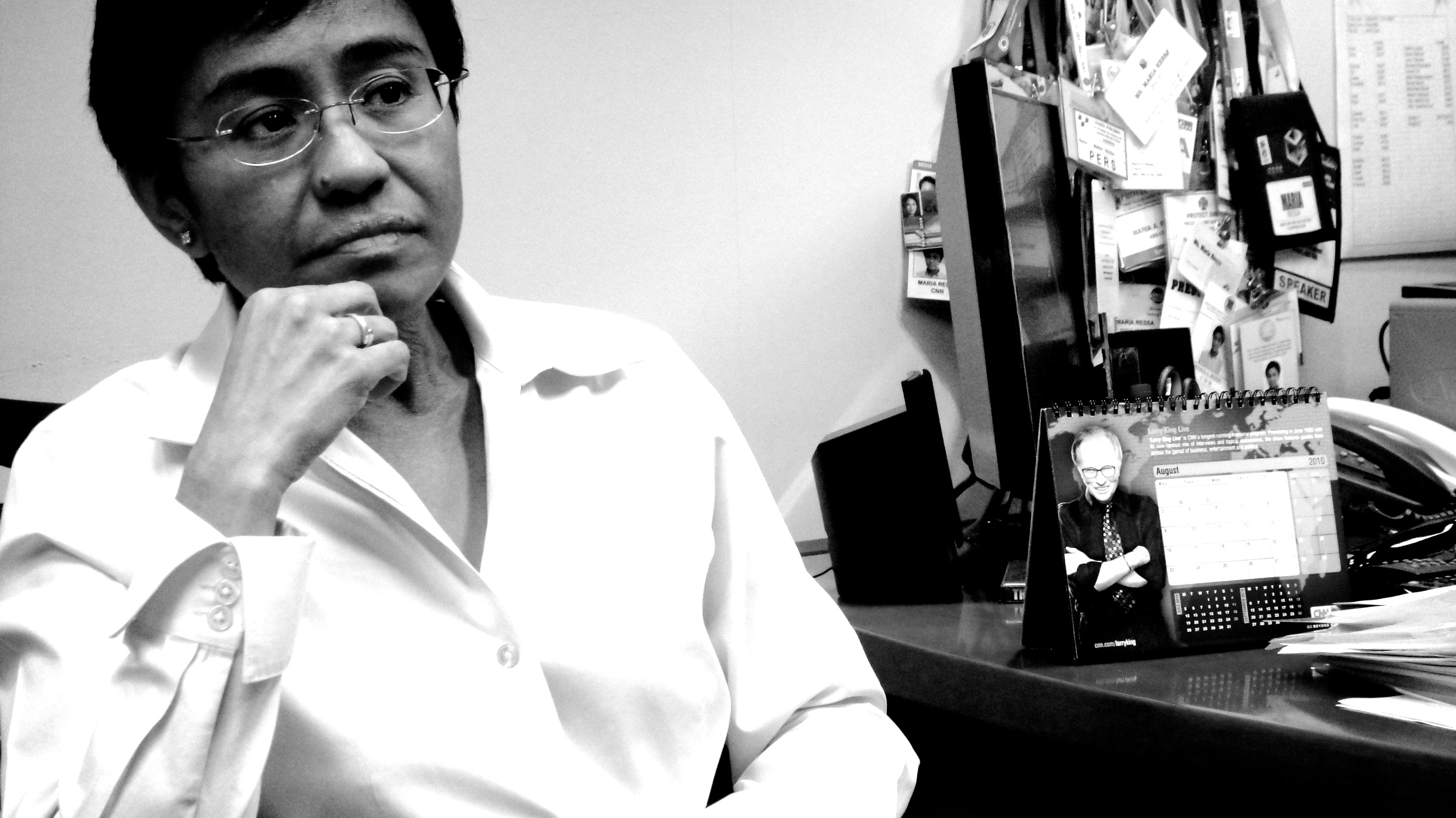
Ressa at her office

From 2004, Ressa headed the news division of ABS-CBN while also writing for CNN and The Wall Street Journal. In September 2010, she wrote a piece for The Wall Street Journal criticizing then president Benigno Aquino III's handling of the Manila hostage crisis. This piece was published two weeks before Aquino's official visit to the United States. Speculations were rife that this, among other reasons, finally led to Ressa's leaving the company in 2010 after deciding not to renew her contract.

=== Academia ===
Ressa has taught courses in politics and the press in Southeast Asia for Princeton University and broadcast journalism for the University of the Philippines Diliman.

She is a fellow at the Initiative on the Digital Economy at the Massachusetts Institute of Technology and is a 2021 Joan Shorenstein Fellow at the Shorenstein Center on Media, Politics and Public Policy and Hauser Leader at the Center for Public Leadership at Harvard Kennedy School. She has been a distinguished fellow at Columbia University's new Institute of Global Politics since fall 2023, where she leads projects related to artificial intelligence (AI) and democracy. In July 2024, she became a professor of professional practice at Columbia's School of International and Public Affairs.

In 2023, she joined The Intercept's board of directors.

=== Books ===
She is the author of three books concerning the rise of terrorism in Southeast Asia: Seeds of Terror: An Eyewitness Account of Al-Qaeda's Newest Center (2003), From Bin Laden to Facebook: 10 Days of Abduction, 10 Years of Terrorism (2013), and How to Stand Up to a Dictator (2022).

In addition, she most recently wrote The Fight Back: A Citizen's Guide to Standing Up to Dictators (Harper, 2026).

=== Rappler ===
Ressa established online news site Rappler in 2012 along with three other female founders and a small team of 12 journalists and developers. The news site initially started as a Facebook page named MovePH in August 2011, evolving into a complete website on January 1, 2012. The site became one of the first multimedia news websites in the Philippines and a major news portal in the Philippines, receiving numerous local and international awards. Ressa serves as executive editor and chief executive officer of the news website.

=== "Real Content Oversight Board" ===
On September 25, 2020, Ressa joined the 25-member Real Facebook Oversight Board, an independent watchdog group established to provide public commentary on Facebook's content moderation policies and role in civic life.

=== UN Internet Governance Forum ===
Ressa was among the ten members of the leadership panel appointed in August 2022 in support of the United Nations' Internet Governance Forum, an annual discussion focusing on addressing issues concerning the internet.

=== Issue One – Council for Responsible Social Media ===
In October 2022, Ressa joined the Council for Responsible Social Media project, launched by Issue One, to address the negative mental, civic, and public health impacts of social media in the United States, co-chaired by former House Democratic Caucus Leader Dick Gephardt and former Massachusetts Lieutenant Governor Kerry Healey.

== Legal issues ==
Rappler cases
- Alleged ownership irregularities: Securities and Exchange Commission: In re: Rappler Inc. and Rappler Holdings Corporation (SP Case No. 08-17-001); Court of Appeals: Rappler Inc. v. SEC (CA-G.R. SP No. 154292); Pasig City RTC Branch 265: People of the Philippines v. Maria Ressa (R-PSG-19-00737-CR); Alleged defamation: Manila RTC Branch 46: People of the Philippines v. Santos, Ressa and Rappler (R-MNL-19-01141-CR); Alleged tax evasion: Pasig City RTC Branch 165: People of the Philippines v. Rappler Holdings Corp. (R-PSG-18-02983-CR); Court of Tax Appeals: People of the Philippines v. Rappler Holdings Corp. and Maria Ressa (Crim. Case No. O-679)

Ressa first interviewed Rodrigo Duterte, 16th president of the Philippines, in the 1980s, when he was mayor of Davao. She again interviewed him in 2015 during his presidential election campaign, when he confessed to killing three people when he was mayor. Under Ressa's leadership, Rappler has been consistently critical of Duterte's policies, especially his policies on the war on drugs, with stories demonstrating that the abuses were being carried out by the police, with Duterte's approval. The website under her stewardship also wrote about the alleged pro-Duterte online "troll army," which, according to the article, was pushing out fake news stories and manipulating the narrative around his presidency.

In July 2017, in his State of the Nation Address, Duterte declared Rappler to be "fully owned" by the Americans and hence in violation of the constitution. He also said, "Not only is Rappler's news fake, it being Filipino is also fake." Subsequently, in August 2017, the Philippine Securities and Exchange Commission (SEC) initiated an investigation against Rappler and demanded to check its documents. In January 2018, it revoked Rappler's license to do business. The case went to the court of appeals, where it was remanded back to the SEC for having no basis. Duterte told a Rappler reporter in 2018: "If you are trying to throw garbage at us, then the least that we can do is explain – how about you? Are you also clean?" The government under his leadership revoked the site's operating license.

=== Arrest and conviction ===
On January 22, 2018, Ressa appeared before the Philippines' National Bureau of Investigation (NBI) to comply with a subpoena over an online libel complaint under the Cybercrime Prevention Act of 2012, which the administration of Rodrigo Duterte has wielded to punish criticism of the President and his allies. The subpoena had been issued on January 10 to Ressa, together with former Rappler reporter Reynaldo Santos and businessman Benjamin Bitanga. The subpoena was filed in October 2017 by a Filipino–Chinese national, Wilfredo Keng, after Rappler published a story on Keng's alleged lending of his sport utility vehicle to now deceased Chief Justice Renato Corona as a bribed form of favor. Though the article was written in 2012, before the act criminalizing cyberlibel was signed into law by Benigno Aquino III, the Department of Justice considered it republished after a typographical error was corrected in 2014. In 2019, human rights lawyers Amal Clooney, Caoilfhionn Gallagher, and Can Yeğinsu joined the legal team (consisting of international and Filipino lawyers) defending Ressa. The Free Legal Assistance Group (FLAG), which is the main human rights law firm in the Philippines, led by attorney Theodore O. "Ted" Te, managed the legal team of Ressa during her different cases.

In November 2018, the Philippine government announced that it would charge Ressa and Rappler's parent company, Rappler Holdings Corporation, with tax evasion and failure to file tax returns. The charge concerns the investment in Rappler by the Omidyar Network in 2015. Ressa has denied wrongdoing, originally stating that the foreign money was "donated" to its managers, later stating the investments were in the form of securities. Rappler issued a statement denying any wrongdoing. The Bureau of Internal Revenue, after a study of Ressa's explanation, ruled that Rappler's issuance of securities-generated capital gains was taxable. It concluded that Rappler evaded payment amounting to ₱133 million in taxes.

On February 13, 2019, Judge Rainelda Estacio-Montesa of the Manila Regional Trial Court Branch #46 issued the arrest warrant for "cyberlibel" against Ressa for an article published on Rappler. NBI officials fulfilled the warrant filed under the charge of cyberlibel. The "cyberlibel" law got passed after the article was originally published, so the charge was based on the technicality that fixing a typo might be considered "republishing". The arrest was live-streamed on Facebook by many of Rappler's senior reporters.

Due to time constraints, Ressa was unable to post bail amounting to ₱60,000 ($1,150), resulting in her arrest and confinement within the (holding) boardroom office of the NBI building. A total of six lawyers, two of them pro bono, were assigned to work on her case. On February 14, 2019, at the executor proceeding of Manila city judge Maria Teresa Abadilla, Ressa gained freedom by posting bail of ₱100,000 ($1,900).

Ressa's arrest was criticized by the international community. Because Ressa is an outspoken critic of President Rodrigo Duterte, many viewed the arrest as being politically motivated. In contrast, the official spokesperson for the Malacañang Palace denied any government involvement in the arrest, asserting that the lawsuit against Ressa was set forth by a private individual: the plaintiff Wilfredo Keng.

Madeleine Albright, a former U.S. Secretary of State, issued an opinion stating that the arrest "must be condemned by all democratic nations". Similarly, the National Union of Journalists of the Philippines called it "a shameless act of persecution by a bully government".

The National Press Club, an organization accused of having close ties to the Duterte regime and with a long history of criticizing the Rappler organization, has stated that the arrest was not harassment and that Ressa should not be relegated to "the altar of press freedom for martyrdom". It also warned against politicizing the issue.

Ressa's trial on charges of cyberlibel began in July 2019. In a statement she made on the first day of her trial, Ressa said, "This case of cyberlibel stretches the rule of law until it breaks."

Ressa was found guilty of cyberlibel on June 15, 2020, in People of the Philippines v. Santos, Ressa and Rappler. under the controversial Anti-Cybercrime law.

In her ruling, Judge Rainelda Estacio-Montesa argued that Rappler "did not offer a scintilla of proof that they verified the imputations of various crimes in the disputed article... They just simply published them as news in their online publication in reckless disregard of whether they are false or not." The judge also quoted Nelson Mandela, saying, "To be free is not merely to cast off one's chains but to live in a way that respects and enhances the freedom of others." Sheila Coronel, director of the Stabile Center for Investigative Journalism at Columbia University, argued that the conviction is representative of "how democracy dies in the 21st century."

Ressa faced six months to six years in prison and a fine of ₱400,000 ($8,000). She warned that her conviction could augur the end of freedom of the press in the Philippines. Presidential spokesperson Harry Roque asked the media to "respect the decision" and said Duterte was still committed to free speech; Vice President Leni Robredo described the conviction as a "chilling development," and the National Union of Journalists of the Philippines said it "basically kills freedom of speech and of the press." Internationally, the ruling was criticized by Human Rights Watch, Amnesty International, and Reporters Without Borders. In its statement condemning the sentence, Reporters Without Borders described the legal proceedings against Ressa as "Kafkaesque".

On January 15, 2023, 12 Nobel Peace Prize laureates, including all of the 2022 laureates and her fellow 2021 Nobel Peace Prize winner Dmitry Muratov, issued an open letter to President Marcos requesting that he "assist in bringing about a rapid resolution to the unjust charges against Maria Ressa and Rappler."

In January 2023, the Court of Tax Appeals acquitted Ressa and Rappler of four tax evasion charges stemming from the 2018 case. Ressa was acquitted of a fifth tax evasion case in September 2023. Ressa's court conviction for cyberlibel and the SEC's order for Rappler to shut down are under appeal as of September 2023.

The Supreme Court of the Philippines First Division's resolution dated January 24, 2024, granted Irene Khan's Motion for Leave to Intervene, to sit as an "amicus curiae" or chosen Expert, and it also admitted and noted her amicus brief submitted through attorney Rodel Taton. According to Khan's brief, she was "concerned" that the law in the country fails to adequately protect the right to freedom of expression, citing Article 19 of the International Covenant on Civil and Political Rights, of which the Philippines is a member. The brief also alleged that the country's Anti-Cybercrime Law "raises serious concerns that it limits the ability of journalists to expose, document and address issues of important public interest, thereby violating the right to receive and impart information." The International Bar Association's Human Rights Institute was also permitted to submit its legal opinion "by way of special appearance" through attorney Maria Cristina Yambot, in Ressa and Reynaldo Santos's case.

In her fifth tax evasion case, Ressa was acquitted by the Court of Tax Appeals Second Division in its 17-page judgment promulgated on July 16. It denied SG Menardo Guevarra's certiorari and sustained Pasig RTC Branch 157, Presiding Judge Ana Teresa Cornejo-Tomacruz's junking of the case in September 2023.

On June 13, 2025, Ressa and five other Rappler executives were acquitted by a court in Pasig of violating restrictions on foreigners owning companies under the Anti-Dummy Law.

== Awards and recognition ==
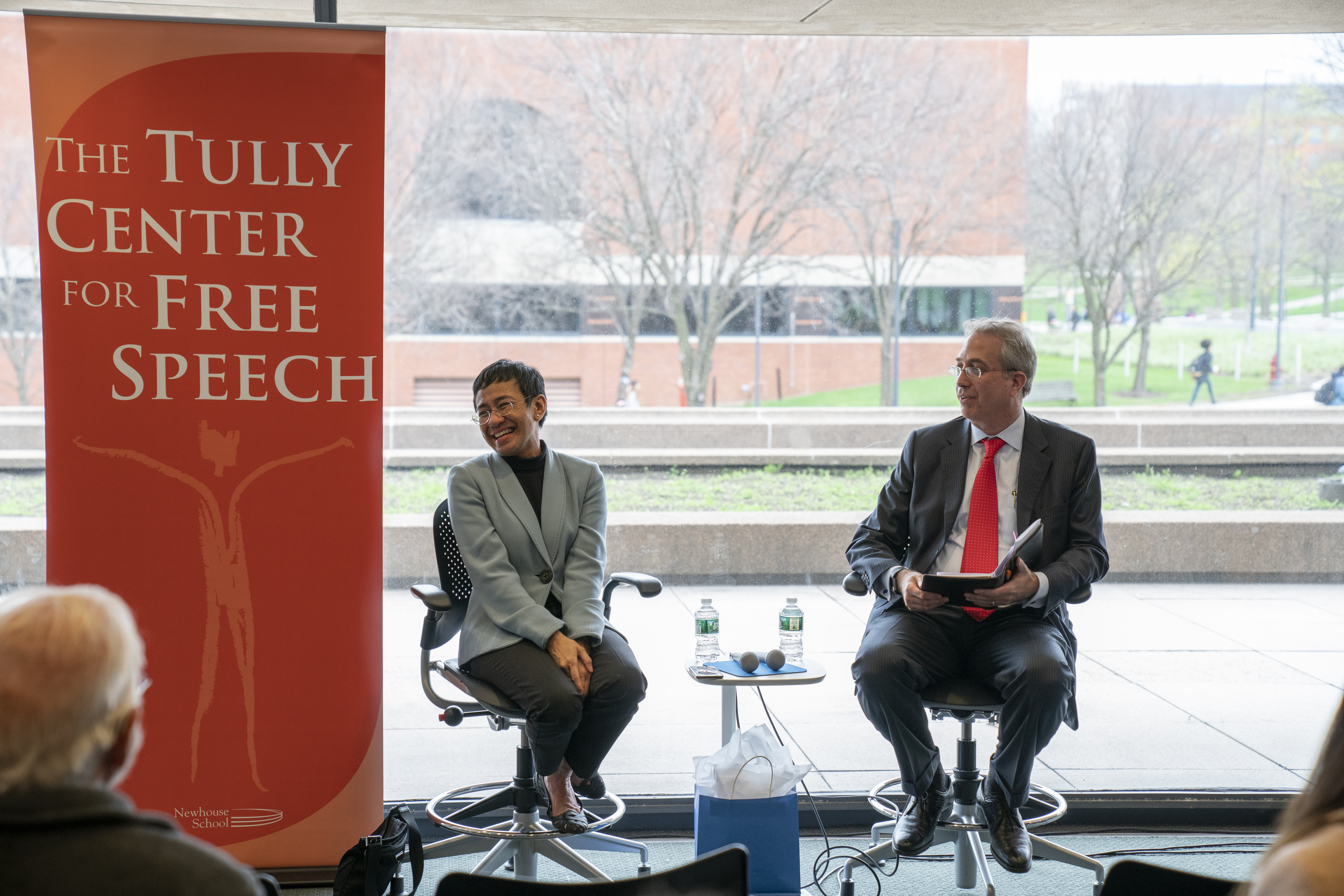
Ressa winning the 2018 Free Speech Award from the Tully Center

Ressa has won an Emmy nomination for Outstanding Investigative Journalism, the Asian Television Awards, TOWNS – Ten Outstanding Women in the Nation's Service (Philippines) and TOYM Philippines.

- In 2010, Esquire proclaimed Ressa the Philippines' "sexiest woman alive," explaining: "Despite her size, fearless enough to write an eyewitness account of Al-Qaeda."
- In 2015, the Philippine Movie Press Club awarded Ressa with an Excellence in Broadcasting Lifetime Achievement award at the 29th PMPC Star Awards for Television.
- In 2016, she was listed as one of the eight most influential and powerful leaders in the Philippines by Kalibrr.
- In November 2017, Ressa, as CEO of news organization Rappler, accepted the 2017 Democracy Award awarded by the National Democratic Institute to three organizations at its annual Democracy Award Dinner in Washington, D.C., entitled "Disinformation vs. Democracy: Fighting for Facts".
- In May 2018, Ressa received the Knight International Journalism Award, by which she was described as "an intrepid editor and media innovator who holds a spotlight to the Philippine government's bloody war on drugs."
- In June 2018, Ressa received the World Association of Newspapers's Golden Pen of Freedom Award for her work with Rappler.
- In November 2018, the Committee to Protect Journalists awarded Ressa the Gwen Ifill Press Freedom Award in "recognition of her journalistic courage in the face of persistent official harassment."
- In December 2018, Ressa was included in Time's Person of the Year 2018, as one of "The Guardians", a number of journalists from around the world combating the "War on Truth." Ressa is the second Filipino to receive the title after former President Corazon Aquino in 1986.
- In February 2019, Ressa received the Ka Pepe Diokno Human Rights Award together with Bishop Pablo Virgilio David from the Tañada-Diokno College of Law at De La Salle University and the Jose W. Diokno Foundation, as presented by Dean Chel Diokno.
- In April 2019, she was included in Time's 100 Most Influential People in the World.
- In May 2019, Ressa won the Columbia Journalism Award from the Columbia University Graduate School of Journalism, the school's highest honor, "for the depth and quality of her work, as well as her courage and persistence in the field."
- In June 2019, Ressa received the Canadian Journalism Foundation's Tribute honour, which recognizes a journalist who has made an impact on the international stage.
- In October 2019, Ressa was named on the BBC's list of 100 Women.
- In April 2021, Ressa won the UNESCO/Guillermo Cano World Press Freedom Prize.
- In November 2022, Ressa received an honorary degree from MacEwan University in Edmonton, Canada.
- In February 2022, Ressa received Princeton University's highest undergraduate alumni honor, the Woodrow Wilson Award.
- Ressa is a recipient of the Washington, D.C.-based Transatlantic Leadership Network 2022 "Freedom of the Media" award for Explanatory Reporting.
- In June 2023, Ressa received an honorary degree in sociology from Ateneo de Manila University after giving the commencement speech.
- In 2024, Ressa was named Harvard University's commencement speaker. Her selection drew her into the controversy of on-campus protests about the Gaza war. In the speech, she stated, "I was attacked online and called antisemitic, by power and money. Because they want power and money. While the other side was already attacking me because I had been onstage with Hillary Clinton. Hard to win, right?" Rabbi Hirschy Zarchi of Harvard walked off the stage.
- Ressa is 2024 Cannes LionHeart recipient, Simon Cook, CEO announced. She was scheduled to deliver a keynote address at Debussy Stage on June 21, 2024.
- In 2025, Ressa won a Missouri Honor Medal from the University of Missouri School of Journalism.

=== Nobel Peace Prize ===
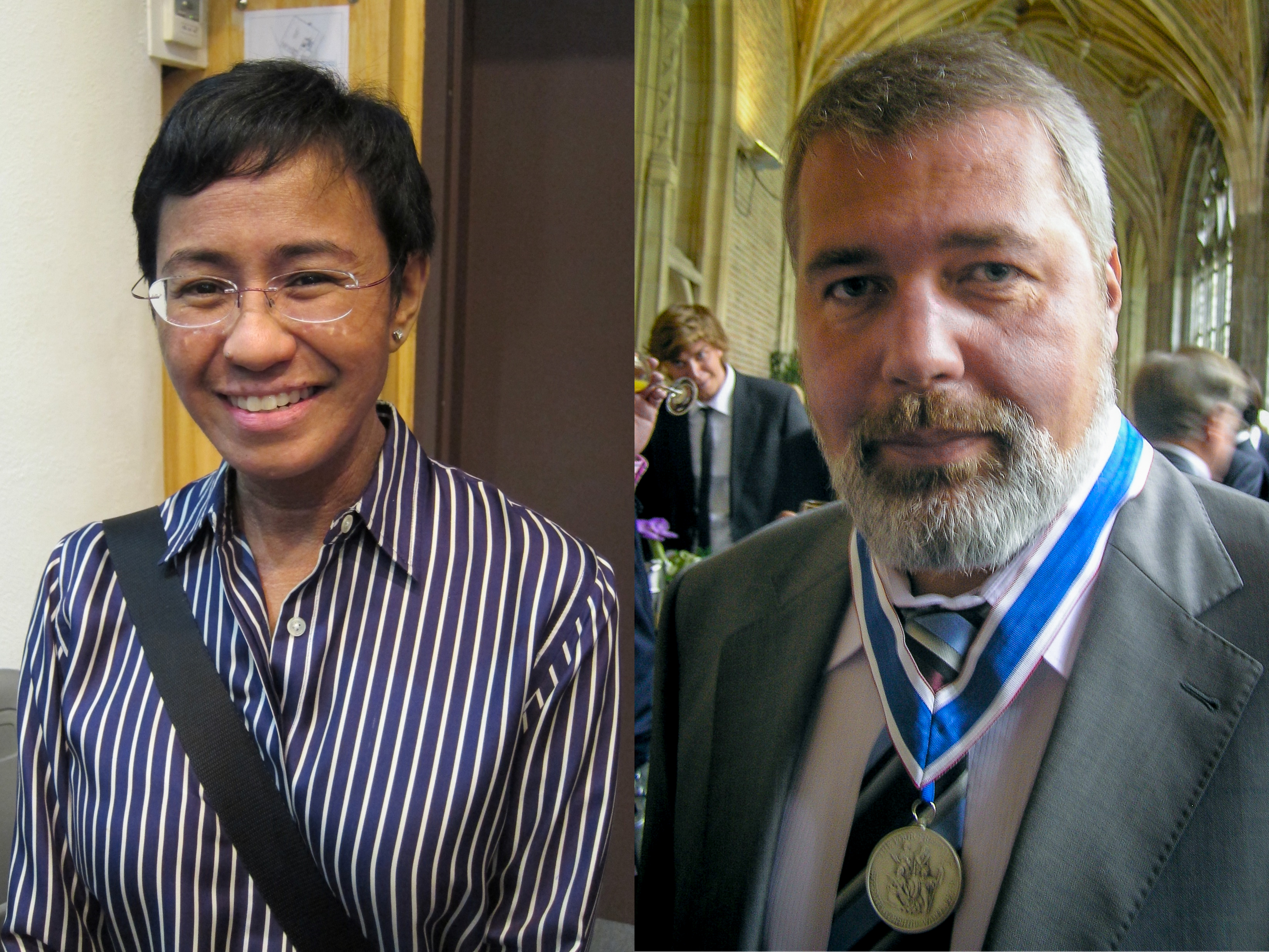
Nobel laurates Ressa and Muratov

Ressa was nominated for the 2021 Nobel Peace Prize by prime minister and leader of the Norwegian Labour Party Jonas Gahr Støre. On October 8, 2021, Ressa was officially announced as recipient of the prize alongside Dmitry Muratov of Russia. The two were awarded the prize "for their efforts to safeguard freedom of expression, which is a precondition for democracy and lasting peace". Ressa and Muratov are the first journalists since 1935 to receive the Nobel Peace Prize.

== Personal life ==
Ressa is openly lesbian.

In May 2024, US Congresswoman Elise Stefanik accused Ressa of antisemitism based on a Rappler editorial that likened Israel to Hitler. Ressa cofounded Rappler in 2012 and leads it as CEO. An earlier comment Ressa made about "money and power" was also criticized by a Harvard rabbi. Ressa has forcefully denied the antisemitism allegations.

== Published works ==
- Seeds of Terror: An Eyewitness Account of Al-Qaeda's Newest Center of Operations in Southeast Asia. The Free Press. 2003. ISBN 978-0743251334.
- From Bin Laden to Facebook: 10 Days of Abduction, 10 Years of Terrorism. Imperial College Press. 2013. ISBN 978-1-908979-53-7.
- How to Stand Up to a Dictator: The Fight for Our Future. Harper. 2022. ISBN 978-0063257511.
- The Fight Back: A Citizen’s Guide to Standing Up to Dictators. Harper. 2026. ISBN 978-0-06-358461-7

== See also ==
- Cybercrime Prevention Act of 2012 – the rule applied in the aforementioned case
- List of Nobel laureates affiliated with Princeton University
- List of Filipino Nobel laureates and nominees
- List of Nobel laureates
- We Hold the Line, a 2020 documentary film about the Philippine drug war and corruption, repression and violence under the regime of Philippine president Rodrigo Duterte, featuring Ressa and her journalistic work and struggles in the Philippines.
- A Thousand Cuts, a 2020 documentary film about Ressa and her journalistic work and struggles in the Philippines.
- 2073, a 2024 British documentary film

Media offices
Preceded by Dong Puno	SVP for News and Current Affairs, ABS-CBN News; 2004–2010	Succeeded by Ging Reyes
