= We Hold the Line =

Film about the Philippine drug war

- German: Die Unbeugsamen: Gefährdete Pressefreiheit auf den Philippinen
- Music by: Ryuichi Sakamoto & Carsten Nicolai; Christina Lux - Song Freedom is not given in closing credits.
- Release date: 2020
- Running time: 92 minutes
- Country: Germany

We Hold the Line (original title: Die Unbeugsamen: Gefährdete Pressefreiheit auf den Philippinen) is a 2020 documentary film about the Philippine drug war and political corruption and violence under Philippine President Rodrigo Duterte.

== Synopsis ==
We Hold the Line documents the Philippine drug war and political corruption by the regime and entourage of Philippine President Rodrigo Duterte, told through politicians, members of the death squads, those who have escaped the killing, and through independent Philippine media.

It particularly features the Philippine investigative media group Rappler, and its star crusading Philippine journalist, 2021 Nobel Peace Prize laureate Maria Ressa, who is harassed and arrested for her efforts.

== Production ==
The 92-minute German film (in English with some Tagalog), was directed by Marc Wiese, and produced by Oliver Stoltz for Dreamer Joint Venture Filmproduktion, GmbH. Germany-based Magnetfilm holds the international rights.

== Recognition ==
=== Film festivals ===
The film's Dutch premiere was at the International Documentary Film Festival Amsterdam

The film was screened online on the closing day of the 13th annual This Human World – International Human Rights Film Festival, of the International Press Institute, and in its first online edition. (Ressa was a member of the IPI board).

It was also featured at the 2020 CPH:DOX (Copenhagen International Documentary Film Festival), 2020 Dokufest International Documentary and Short Film Festival, and the 2020 Moscow International Film Festival

It was also featured at the 17th VERZIÓ Human Rights Documentary Film Festival / 2020 VERZIÓ Film Festival. and the 2021 ReFrame Film Festival.

=== Awards and nominations ===
- Winner, 2020 F:ACT Award, CPH:DOX (Copenhagen International Documentary Film Festival)
- Nominee, 2020 Truth Award, Dokufest International Documentary and Short Film Festival
- Winner, 2020 Award for Artistic Excellence, Moscow International Film Festival
- Nominee, 2020 Silver St. George, Moscow International Film Festival
