= Leo Echegaray =

Filipino convicted criminal executed in 1999

- Born: Leo Pilo Echegaray; July 11, 1960; Manila, Philippines
- Died: February 5, 1999 (aged 38); New Bilibid Prison, Muntinlupa, Philippines
- Status: Executed by lethal injection
- Conviction: Aggravated rape
- Penalty: Death

Leo Pilo Echegaray (11 July 1960 – 5 February 1999) was the first Filipino to be executed since 1976 after the Philippines reinstated the death penalty in 1993. The Free Legal Assistance Group or FLAG lawyer Theodore Te worked to stay his execution due to controversies behind the reinstatement of the death penalty. His death sparked national debate over the legality and morality of capital punishment, which was suspended in March 2000 and abolished in 2006.

== Trial and execution ==
In 1994, Echegaray, a house painter, was charged with repeatedly raping Rodessa, the 10-year-old daughter of his live-in-partner (Rodessa was nicknamed "Baby" by the press). He had raped her least five times between April and July 1994 and threatened to kill her mother if she said anything. After the Philippines reinstated the death penalty, rape became a capital offense when certain aggravating factors were present. In the case of Echegaray, the crime was a capital offense since the victim was a minor and Echegaray had been her male guardian. During Echegaray's trial in September 1994, Rodessa's mother, Rosalie, accused her daughter of lying and claimed that the accusations were made up by the girl's grandmother out of greed. She even denied that Echegaray had been the girl's male guardian, hoping to reduce his conviction to non-capital rape. After Echegaray was found guilty and sentenced to death, Rosalie wept and embraced him.

On September 7, 1994, Echegaray was convicted by Branch 104 of the Regional Trial Court in Quezon City of rape and was sentenced to death. The death sentence was automatically reviewed by the Supreme Court and confirmed on June 25, 1996. This made him the first death row inmate to have their sentence confirmed. Echegaray filed for another review of his case, but the motion was denied on February 7, 1998. In March 1998, Echegaray filed two more appeals, challenging the constitutionality of the execution procedure and saying his death sentence violated his right to equal protection under law. The Philippine Commission on Human Rights also filed an appeal on behalf of Echegaray, challenging the constitutionality of the death penalty and claiming that it violated international law. Ultimately, however, the Supreme Court rejected these arguments in two rulings on October 12, 1998, and October 21, 1998. In its October 12 ruling, the Supreme Court stated that no executions could take place until the execution manual had been made public and an issue regarding reprieves for pregnant death row inmates was fixed. The Department of Justice complied with the order and sought the court's approval no later than October 21.

Echegaray filed another appeal, saying he could no longer be executed since his death sentence had not been carried out between 12 and 18 months of his judgement becoming final. After the Supreme Court rejected this appeal, he received a death warrant on November 16, 1998. An execution date was set for January 4, 1999. A week before, Echegaray married an old girlfriend from college. At this, the girl's mother concluded her daughter had been telling the truth about Echegaray. However, the girl refused to forgive her. Echegaray won a reprieve just three hours it was set to happen. By then, he had already ordered his last meal of sardines and dried fish. The reprieve was issued since the legislature was having second thoughts on capital punishment.

The stay of execution was lifted after the legislature decided to retain it for the time being. Echegaray filed a motion to appeal, which was denied on January 19, 1999.

On January 26, the Supreme Court rejected Echegaray's final plea for another reprieve and announced that it would no longer hear any further petitions. President Joseph Estrada rejected pleas for clemency from the European Union and the Vatican, declaring that he wanted to send a message to future rapists. He had also been swayed by a visit from the girl, who said Echegaray deserved to die and that she was against clemency. Echegaray was executed via lethal injection on February 5, 1999. He was told of Philippines Supreme Court's ruling to reject his last-minute appeal shortly he was to set die by lethal injection at Manila's New Bilibid Prison. Echegaray became the first man to be executed in the Philippines since 1976, and one of seven Filipinos who were executed between 1999 and 2000. His last meal consisted of prawns, bulalo, and grilled fish. He was also allowed to smoke several cigarettes.

Echegaray maintained his innocence at his trial and in prison. However, he appeared to admit his guilt in his final statement, albeit his exact last words are disputed. According to prison officials, Echegaray's final statement was "Baby, forgive me," referring to the girl. However, other witnesses said he had asked his countrymen for forgiveness.

"Sámbayanáng Pilipino, patawarin ako sa kasalanang ipinaratang ninyo sa akin. Pilipino, pinatáy ng kapwa Pilipino."
("People of the Philippines, forgive me of the sin which you have accused me. A Filipino, killed by fellow Filipinos.")

Echegaray was pronounced dead eight minutes later.

== See also ==
- Capital punishment in the Philippines
- Alex Bartolome, another convicted rapist who became the last prisoner executed in the Philippines on January 4, 2000.
