= Niall O'Brien (priest) =

Irish Columban missionary priest

- Father Niall O'Brien on the cover of Misyon magazine
- Born: 2 August 1939; Dublin, Ireland
- Died: 28 April 2004 (aged 64); Pisa, Italy
- Occupation: Missionary priest

Niall O'Brien (2 August 1939 in Dublin, Ireland – 28 April 2004 in Pisa, Italy) was an Irish Columban missionary priest, notable for being falsely accused of and detained in the Philippines in the 1980s on charges of multiple murders. He was ordained a priest in 1963.

== Hiligaynon bible ==
O'Brien was fluent in Hiligaynon. Bishop Antonio Fortich invited him to a Liturgical Commission that translated the Bible and the liturgy of the mass into Hiligaynon. He joined the commission and helped to translate these texts.

== Revolutionary activities ==
In the 1970s, while posted in the mountain village of Tabugon, Kabankalan, Negros Occidental, he bought a farm and setup a workers' co-operative, which he called a kibbutz.

During O'Brien's time in Negros Occidental, the province experienced poverty, resistance to a feudal system that has been around for centuries, and militarization. These factors created hostility between church leaders and landowning families. Filomeno V Aguilar Jr., writing for the Philippine Sociological Review, described the sugar workers of Negros Occidental in the mid-1970s as having the reputation for "wallowing in hunger and severe malnutrition, [and being] victims of acute poverty and injustice".

O'Brien believed that "small Christian communities and nonviolence are the means to transform oppressive societies", including the one on Negros Occidental. He encouraged the poor to "take up small issues which enabled them to find themselves", through writing letters to military headquarters in response to constant loud gunfire, organizing marches where the army had killed people, and holding prayer rallies for the dead. He believed the people running the local sugar industry in Negros Occidental were "irritated ... by Church-inspired demands for greater justice through the creation of labor unions, protest marches, sermons and articles in the international press", and that his eventual arrest alongside the rest of the Negros Nine was caused by the government, the sugar industry, and local landowners.

== Arrest for multiple murders ==
On 6 May 1983, O'Brien was arrested along with two other missionary priests, Fr. Brian Gore, an Australian, Fr. Vicente Dangan, a Filipino, alongside six lay workers. Together, they were known as the "Negros Nine", charged for the murders of Mayor Pablo Sola of Kabankalan and four of his aides two years prior. The priests were held under house arrest at military guest quarters near Bacolod until 26 January 1984, when they voluntarily surrendered to the local jail warden, asking to be imprisoned with the 6 accused lay workers.

The case received widespread publicity in Ireland and Australia, the home of one of the co-accused priests, Fr. Brian Gore. Charlie Bird interviewed Fr. O'Brien at a Philippine prison on RTÉ News. He was defended together with the rest of the Negros Nine by human rights lawyer and senator Jose W. Diokno of the Free Legal Assistance Group (FLAG). During a march in Dublin on 26 May 1984, Olivia O'Brien, the mother of Niall O'Brien, demanded that Reagan should get Marcos to free her son from prison. On 28 May 1984, U.S. president Ronald Reagan was interviewed by Brian Farrell of RTÉ Television in the White House Library. Farrell told him how people in Ireland are asking him to "make an intervention in regard to the trial of priests there in Manila." Reagan responded that he had "only recently heard about that", and that "if there is anyway in which we could be of help in that, we'd be pleased to do it".

== Exile and return ==
On 3 July 1984, O'Brien and Gore's case, along with the 6 lay workers, were dismissed citing a lack of evidence. Both priests agreed to leave Negros Occidental within a month. After the Marcos regime fell in the People Power Revolution in 1986, they both returned to Negros Occidental to continue their missionary work.

== Personal life ==
Father Niall O'Brien was born in the suburb of Blackrock, in Dublin, Ireland on 2 August 1939. He began studying for the priesthood in 1957. He was ordained a priest in 1963.

== Death ==
He died in Pisa, Italy on 28 April 2004, aged 64, from an accidental fall from his wheelchair. He had been receiving treatment for a chronic blood disorder. His remains are in Kabankalan, Negros Occidental.

== Books by Fr. O'Brien ==
- Revolution from the Heart
- Seeds of Injustice
- Island of Tears
