= Free Legal Assistance Group =

Philippine non-profit organization

FLAG
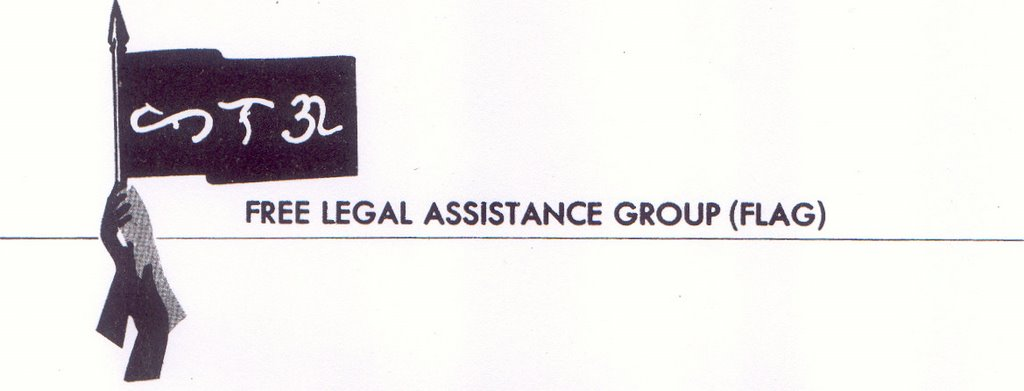
- Founded: October 21, 1974; 51 years ago at 12 Margarita St., Magallanes Village, Makati, Philippines
- Founders: Jose W. Diokno; Lorenzo M. Tañada; J.B.L. Reyes; Joker Arroyo
- Headquarters: Sanidad Law Office, 2nd Floor Eastside Building, 77 Malakas Street, Brgy. Pinyahan, Diliman, Quezon City, Philippines
- Fields: human rights, legal representation, legal advice
- Key people: Chel Diokno (Chairperson); Ma. Soccoro Tadea I. "Cookie" Diokno (Secretary General); Arno V. Sanidad (Deputy Secretary General)
- Website: FLAG Namati Website

The Free Legal Assistance Group (FLAG) is a nationwide organization of human rights lawyers in the Philippines. It was founded in 1974 by Senator Jose W. Diokno, Lorenzo Tañada, J.B.L. Reyes, and Joker Arroyo during the martial law era under former President Ferdinand Marcos. It is the first and largest group of human rights lawyers established in the nation. They work on countering varied abuses against human rights and civil liberties. Its current chairman since 2025 is human rights lawyer Ted Te.

== Founding and martial law era ==
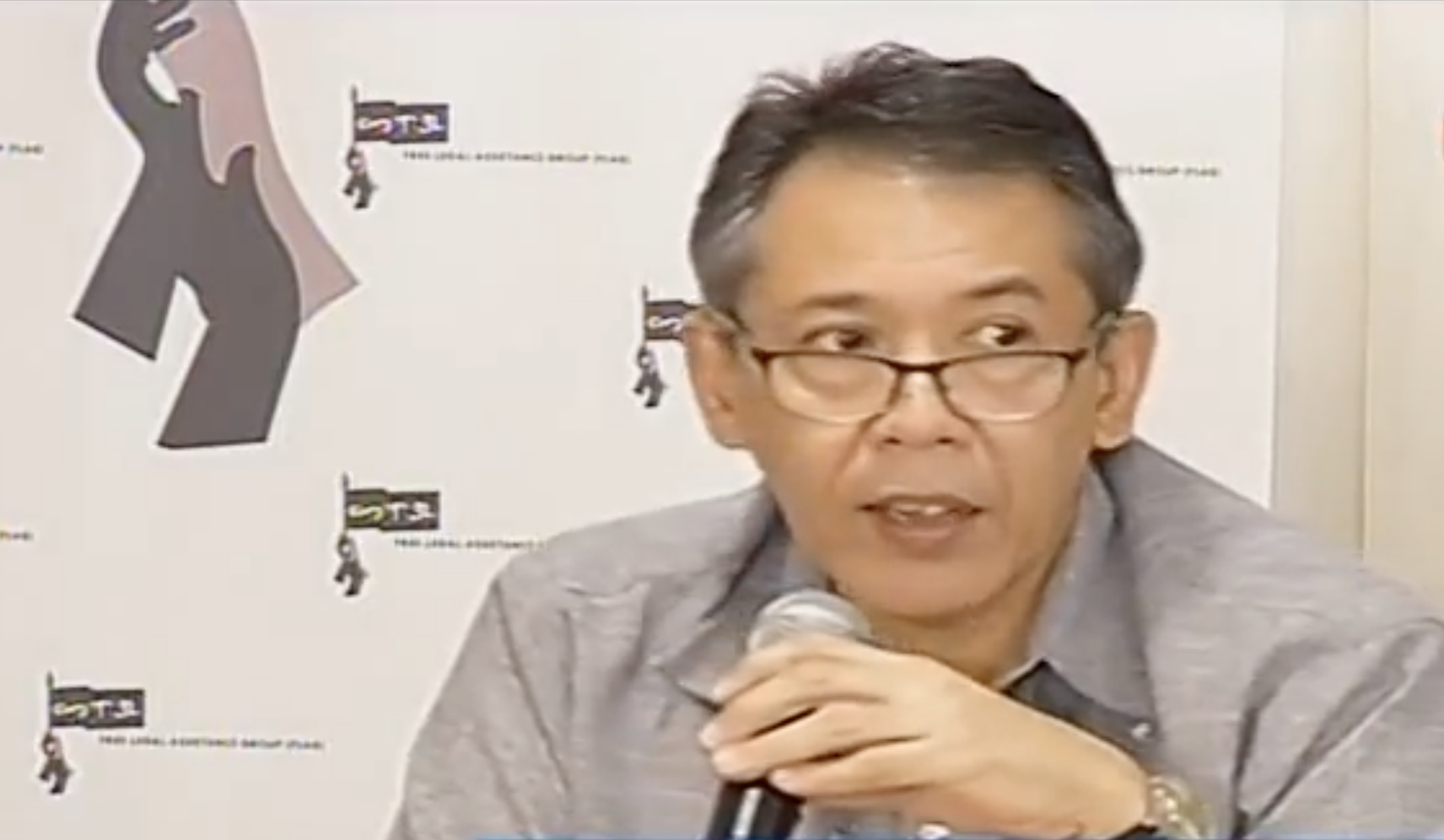
FLAG chairman Dean Chel Diokno

FLAG was founded in October 1974 at the home of Sen. Jose W. Diokno, together with Sen. Lorenzo M. Tañada, Justice J.B.L. Reyes, and Atty. Joker Arroyo—more than two years after the 1972 proclamation of Martial law under Ferdinand Marcos. Diokno had conceived the law firm during his imprisonment. After his release on September 11, 1974, which came after spending 718 days as a political prisoner under the Marcos administration, he organized FLAG with his friend, retired Sen. Tañada and a group of young lawyers. The group was conceived as a means of supporting human rights victims through a new and innovative method called developmental legal aid or developmental legal advocacy. FLAG member Atty. Arno Sanidad later stated that in 1976, he was among the five lawyers from the University of the Philippines Diliman to serve as the first paralegals in the country, under the guidance of Diokno and FLAG.

During the dictatorship, FLAG defended farmers, similar victims of agrarian reform, and activists who were victims of paramilitary abuses, with Diokno noted to have helped even further by giving allowances to clients without any financial means. Most cases at this time regarding human rights abuses were handled by FLAG, in coordination with smaller groups such as the Task Force Detainees of the Philippines. Human Rights Primers were also an integral aspect of the advocacy of human rights that FLAG initiated in the Philippines.

FLAG's activities sometimes placed lawyers working with them at risk. Among the (at least) twelve FLAG lawyers murdered during the dictatorship were Zorro Aguilar, Romraflo Taojo, Vicente Mirabueno, and Crisostomo Cailing, all of whom have since been honored by having their names inscribed on the wall of remembrance at the Philippine Bantayog ng mga Bayani, which honors the martyrs and heroes who fought against the Marcos dictatorship's authoritarian rule. FLAG has handled cases such as the 1984 case of the "Negros Nine" kidnapped military victims of Marcos.

== Post-EDSA Revolution ==
FLAG continued to handle leading human rights cases including the death penalty case of Leo Echegaray in 1999. FLAG also represented the Manalo brothers and won the first writ of amparo case in 2008, which was a legal writ first proposed in the Philippines by Senator Diokno in the 1980s.

Due to their contributions during the martial law and post-EDSA generations, FLAG has been a recipient of multiple awards such as the Concerned Women of the Philippines (CWP) Human Rights Award in the 1980s, and the Chino Roces Award in the 2000s from President Gloria Arroyo.

== Recent history ==
Among the recent advocacies of FLAG has been to help stem the tide of extrajudicial killings linked to the Philippine drug war started by President Rodrigo Duterte. There have also been cases linked to the libel case of Maria Ressa, as well as the Anti-Terror Law of 2020. FLAG lawyers Chel Diokno and Sanidad petitioned to declare Section 4(e) as unconstitutional, for defining terrorism as excluding advocacy, protest, dissent, and similar actions "not intended to cause death or serious physical harm to a person, to endanger a person's life, or to create a serious risk to public safety." The Supreme Court agreed to declare it as unconstitutional for being overbroad.

The Supreme Court celebrated the golden anniversary of the organization at the Supreme Court with former member and Senior Associate Justice Marvic Leonen. In 2025, Chairman Diokno handed over the chairmanship to Ted Te, after swearing in as a party-list congressman. Te was the Metro Manila Regional Coordinator, who worked with multiple victims and represented journalist Maria Ressa in her libel cases. Ressa was eventually acquitted.

== Notable cases ==
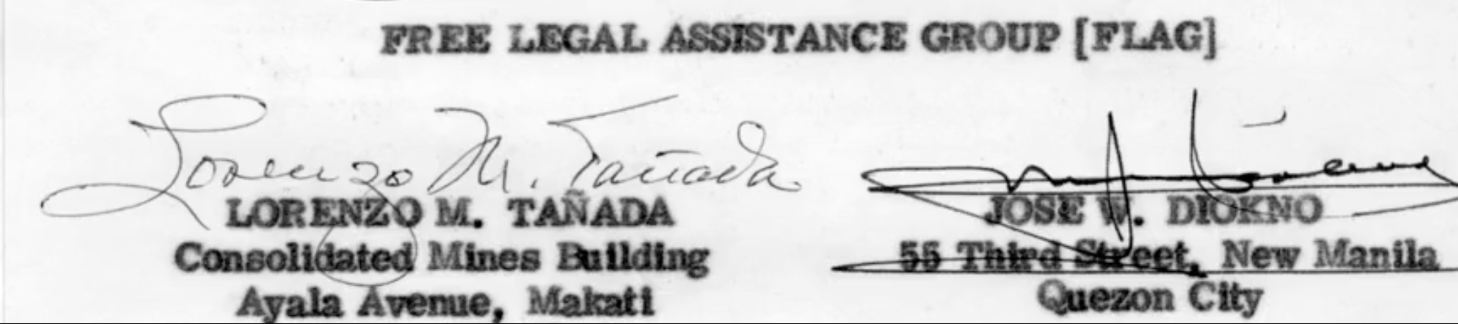
Pleading from founders Diokno and Tañada

=== Procedure ===
- Trinidad v. Olano, G.R. No. 59449;

=== Academic Freedom ===
- Beriña v. Philippine Maritime Institute, G.R. No. L-58610;
- Guzman v. National University, G.R. No. L-68288;
- Villar v. Technological Institute of the Philippines, G.R. L-69198;
- Alcuaz v. Philippine School of Business Administration, G.R. No. 76353;
- Non v. Dames, G.R. No. 89317;
- Manila Public School Teachers Association v. Cariño, G.R. No. 96554;

=== Military Authority ===
- Luneta v. Special Military Commission No. 1, G.R. No. L-49473;
- Olaguer v. Military Commission No. 34, G.R. No. L-54558;
- Aberca v. Ver, G.R. No. L-69866;
- Brocka v. Enrile G.R. Nos. 69863–65;
- FLAG v. Arroyo, case withdrawn;
- David v. Arroyo, G.R. No. 171396;

=== Rebellion/ Subversion ===
- Luneta v. Special Military Commission No. 1, G.R. No. L-49473;
- Garcia-Padilla v. Enrile, G.R. No. L-61388;
- Umil v. Ramos I and II, G.R. No. 81567;

=== Illegal Possession of Firearms ===
- Baylosis v. Chavez, G.R. No. 95136;
- People v. Ringor Jr., G.R. No. 123918;

=== Habeas Corpus ===
- Ilagan v. Enrile, G.R. No. 70748;
- Moncupa v. Enrile, G.R. No. L-63345;
- Gordula v. Enrile, G.R. No. L-63761;
- Dizon v. Eduardo, G.R. No. L-59118;
- Manalo v. Castillo;

=== Right to Bail ===
- People v. Donato, G.R. No. 79269;

=== Search and Seizure ===
- Burgos v. Chief of Staff, G.R. No. L-64261;
- Nolasco v. Pano, G.R. No. L-69803;
- Guazon v. De Villa, G.R. No. 80508;
- People v. Damaso, G.R. No. 93516;
- Basco and Nicoleta v. Salazar;

=== Right to Counsel ===
- Diokno v. Enrile, G.R. No. L-36315;
- Morales v. Enrile, G.R. No. L-61016;

=== Death Penalty ===
- People v. Echegaray, G.R. No. 117472;
- Echegaray v. Secretary of Justice, G.R. No. 132601;
- People v. Parazo, G.R. No. 121176;
- People v. Salarza, G.R. No. 117682;

=== Free Speech ===
- People of the Philippines v. Santos, Ressa and Rappler (RTC Case R-MNL-19-01141-CR);
- Carpio v. Guevara, G.R. No. L-57439;
- Reyes v. Bagatsing, G.R. No. L-65366;
- Del Prado v. Ermita, G.R. No. 169848;
- Gonzales v. Katigbak, G.R. No. 69500;
- Sanidad v. COMELEC, G.R. No. L-44640;
- Vasquez v. CA G.R. No. 118971;
- Philippine Press Institute v. Ermita, G.R. No. 180303;
- Raoul Esperas et al., v. Ermita et al., G.R. No. 181159;
- Bayan v. Ermita, G.R. No. 169838;
- Calleja v. Executive Secretary, G.R. No. 252578;

=== Political Prisoners ===
- People v. Salle Jr., y Gercilla, G.R. No. 103567;
- People v. Casido, G.R. No. 116512;

=== DNA Testing ===
- Andal v. People, G.R. Nos. 138268–69;
- In re: The Writ of Habeas Corpus for Reynaldo De Villa, taken from De Villa v. Director, New Bilibid Prisons, G.R. No. 158802;

=== US Bases ===
- Salonga v. Executive Secretary, G.R. No. 176051;

=== Oil Deregulation ===
- Coconut Oil Refiners Association, Inc. v. Torres, G.R. No. 132527;

=== Right to Electricity ===
- Freedom from Debt Coalition v. Energy Regulatory Commission, G.R. No. 161113;

=== Amparo ===
- Secretary of National Defense v. Manalo, G.R. No. 180906;

== Other notable members ==
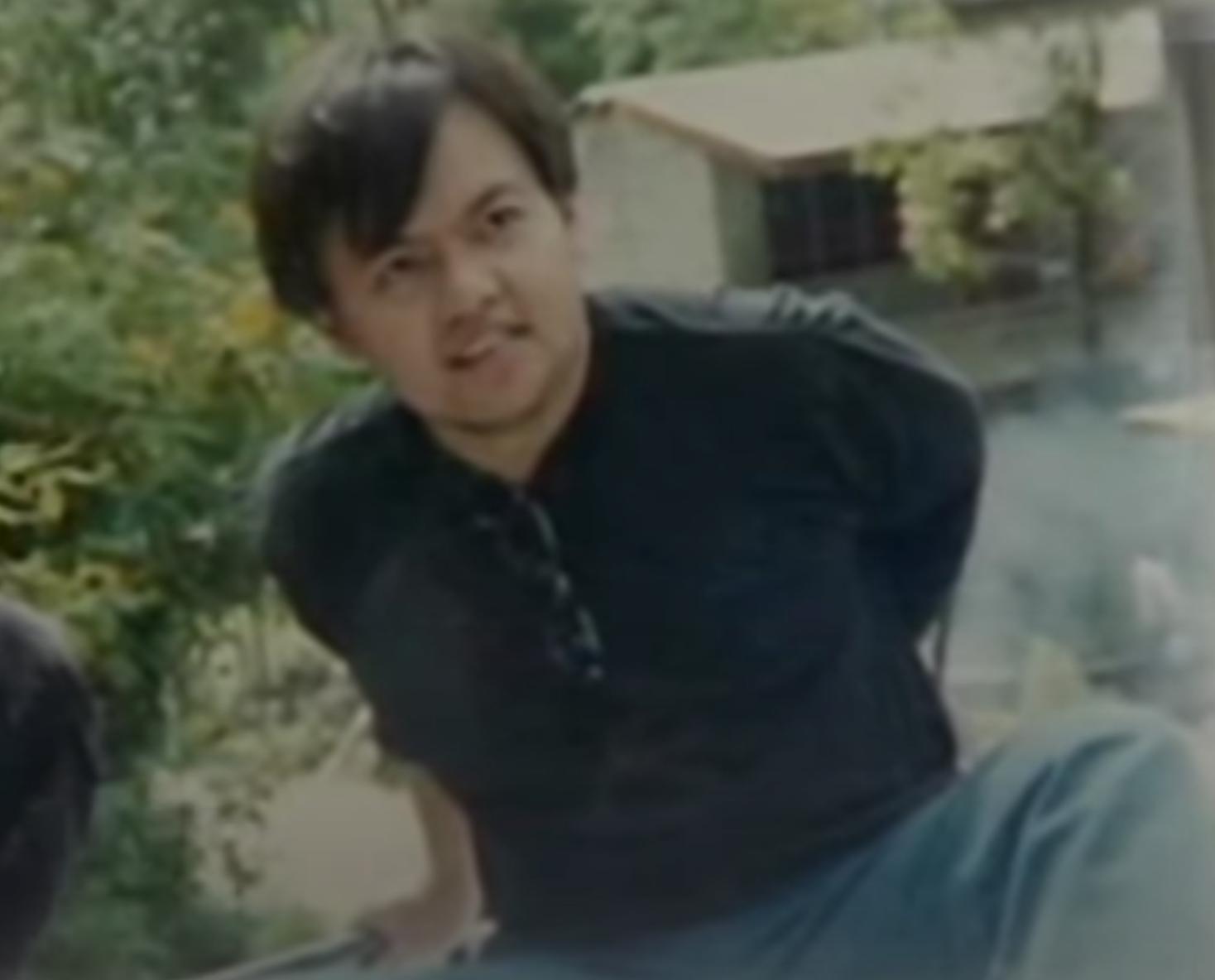
FLAG member and future SC Associate J. Marvic Leonen

- Roberto A. Abad, associate justice of the Supreme Court who first worked at the Jose W. Diokno Law Office as an associate from 1968 to 1969, then later joined FLAG under Diokno;
- Zorro Aguilar, activist, newspaper editor, and human rights lawyer from Dipolog, Zamboanga, who became a martyr during the late years of Marcos's militaristic regime. He is one of the first 65 names inscribed on the wall of remembrance at the Bantayog ng mga Bayani, which honored him as a martyr of the resistance against the dictatorship;
- Jejomar Binay, vice-president, Chair of the Metro Manila chapter in the 1970s;
- David Bueno, human rights lawyer, martial law activist, and martyr who defended Martial Law victims in Ilocos Norte, which was the native province of Ferdinand Marcos. He is one of the first 65 names inscribed on the wall of remembrance at the Bantayog ng mga Bayani, which honored him as a martyr of the resistance against the dictatorship;
- Francisco B. Cruz, lawyer of the Negros Nine;
- Arthur Galace, FLAG coordinator for the Benguet province and regional chairperson for Northern Luzon during the Marcos dictatorship, known for defending the majority of political detainees in Northern Luzon, which included student activists, indigenous leaders, farmers, and even fellow lawyers who had angered the administration because of their human rights advocacy;
- Antonio M. “Tony” La Viña, former Dean of the Ateneo School of Government, human rights lawyer, and activist;
- Marvic Leonen, associate justice of the Supreme Court;
- Rosario "Chato" Olivas-Gallo, Tañada-Diokno School of Law vice-dean, children's rights activist, and CEO of Christian Solidarity Worldwide, which is a human rights organization that protects persecuted Christians and is based in Hong Kong. Olivas-Gallo through Christian Solidarity Worldwide has also called for freer democratic processes in developing countries;
- Kiko Pangilinan, senator and vice-presidential candidate;
- Manuel Quibod, human rights lawyer specializing in taxation law, FLAG Regional Coordinator for Southern Mindanao, and Dean of the Ateneo de Davao College of Law;
- Rene Saguisag, senator, professor, Manila Times columnist, and lawyer who served as the spokesman for President Corazon Aquino after the 1986 People Power Revolution;
- Arno Sanidad, FLAG Deputy Secretary General, law professor, and member of the Regional Council on Human Rights in Asia whose law office serves as FLAG's mailing address for filed grievances concerning abuse and reports of human rights violations;
- Lorenzo "Erin" Tañada III, human rights lawyer, congressman, activist, and news anchor and broadcaster for UNTV;
- Romraflo Taojo, Filipino labor and human rights lawyer, activist, and educator killed on April 2, 1985, when an unidentified gunman believed to be part of a paramilitary group acting on orders from the military shot him at his apartment in Tagum, Davao del Norte. He is one of the first 65 names inscribed on the wall of remembrance at the Bantayog ng mga Bayani, which honored him as a martyr of the resistance against the dictatorship;
- Theodore O. "Ted" Te, former Supreme Court spokesperson, lawyer of Leo Echegaray and Maria Ressa, and Regional Coordinator of FLAG Metro Manila;
- Haydee B. Yorac, Commission on Elections Chairwoman, Chairwoman of the Presidential Commission on Good Government, and Ramon Magsaysay Award Winner;

== See also ==
- Jose W. Diokno
- Chel Diokno
- Lorenzo Tañada
- Human rights abuses of the Marcos dictatorship
- Task Force Detainees of the Philippines
- Bantayog ng mga Bayani
