= Ted Te =

Filipino lawyer

Theodore O. Te

Spokesperson of the Supreme Court of the Philippines
- In office 2017–2019
- Appointed by: Maria Lourdes Sereno
- Preceded by: Midas Marquez
- Succeeded by: Brian Keith Hosaka

Chairman of the Free Legal Assistance Group
- Incumbent
- Assumed office June 30, 2025
- Preceded by: Chel Diokno

Personal details
- Born: Theodore O. Te; April 3, 1966 (age 60) Davao City, Philippines
- Education: University of the Philippines (AB, JD) Columbia University (LL.M.)
- Occupation: Professor, human rights attorney

Theodore O. "Ted" Te is a Filipino human rights lawyer, professor, and former Spokesperson of the Supreme Court of the Philippines during the tenure of Chief Justice Maria Lourdes Sereno. He resigned on the position after Sereno was ousted.

A lawyer of the Free Legal Assistance Group (FLAG) and also its Regional Coordinator of FLAG Metro Manila, he is notable for serving as counsel for Leo Echegaray who was sentenced to death, as well as Rappler founder and Nobel Peace Prize recipient Maria Ressa.

== Early life and education ==
Te was born in Davao City, Southern Philippines. He graduated with a degree in psychology from the University of the Philippines, where he was involved in the student movement opposing tuition fee increases. In 1990, he received his law degree from the University of the Philippines College of Law. As a law student, he was already involved with the Free Legal Assistance Group (FLAG) and was vice chairperson of the Philippine Law Journal. He passed the bar examination on the same year.

In 2012, he finished his master's in law degree from Columbia University Law School.

== Legal career ==
Te began private practice and volunteered for the Free Legal Assistance Group (FLAG). In 1997, he co-founded the law firm Sanidad, Abaya, Te, Enriquez, & Tan. He served as Vice President for Legal Affairs of the University of the Philippines. He is also an Assistant Professor and former director of the Office of Legal Aid at the University of the Philippines College of Law. In 2025, he was appointed as interim chair of FLAG.

== Awards ==
In 2002, Te received the Ten Outstanding Young Men (TOYM) of the Philippines Award for Legal Aid and Human Rights.
