= Tore Storehaug =

Norwegian politician (born 1992)

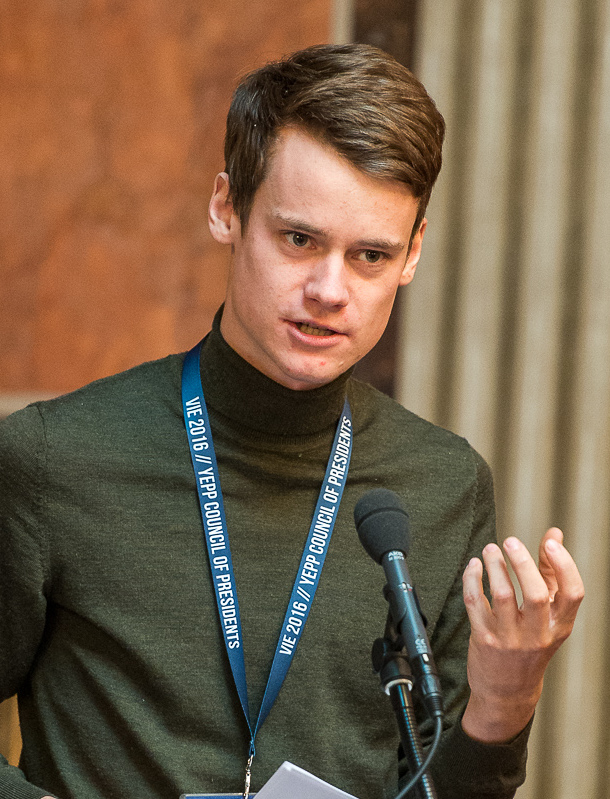
- Storehaug in 2016
- Born: 18 February 1992 (age 34)
- Occupation: Politician

Tore Storehaug (born 18 February 1992) is a Norwegian politician. He was elected representative to the Storting for the period 2017–2021 for the Christian Democratic Party. He is a member of the Standing Committee on Energy and the Environment.
