= Carl-Erik Grimstad =

Norwegian politician (born 1952)

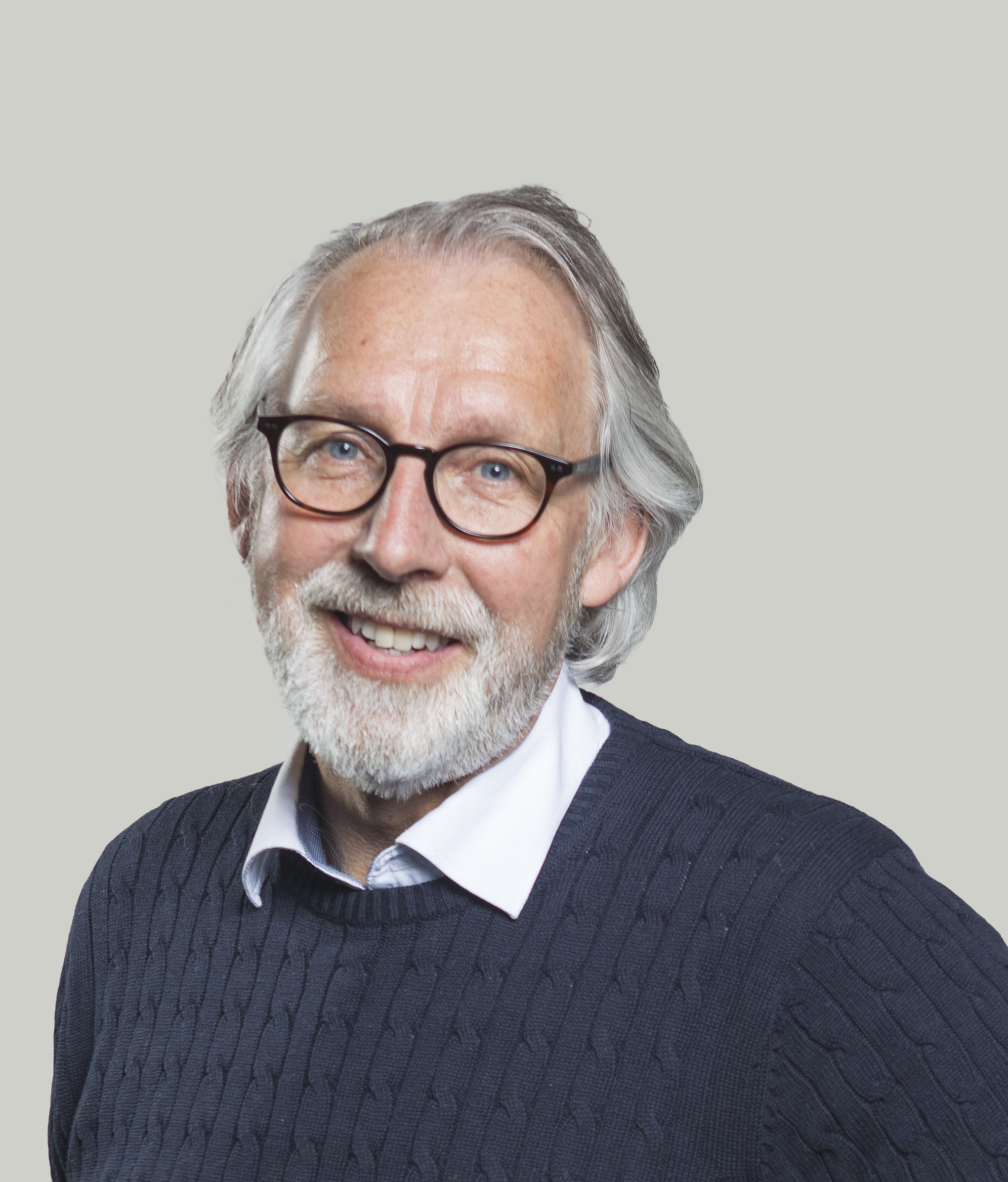
- Grimstad in 2015
- Born: 17 September 1952 (age 73)
- Occupation: Politician

Carl-Erik Grimstad (born 17 September 1952) is a Norwegian politician. He was elected representative to the Storting for the period 2017–2021 for the Liberal Party.
