= Economy of the Philippines =

- Metro Manila, the economic center of the Philippines
- Currency: Philippine peso (Filipino: piso; sign: ₱; code: PHP)
- Fiscal year: Calendar year
- Trade organizations: ADB, AIIB, AFTA, APEC, ASEAN, EAS, G-24, RCEP, WTO and others
- Country group: Developing/Emerging; Upper-middle income economy; Newly industrialized country

Statistics
- Population: ▲112,729,484 (2024)
- GDP: ▲$512.22 billion (nominal; 2026 est.); ▲$1.572 trillion (PPP; 2026 est.)
- GDP rank: 35th (nominal; 2026 est.); 31st (PPP; 2026 est.)
- GDP growth: 5.7% (2024); 4.4% (2025)
- GDP per capita: ▲$4,443 (nominal; 2026 est.); ▲$13,639 (PPP; 2026 est.)
- GDP per capita rank: 129th (nominal; 2026 est.); 118th (PPP; 2026 est.)
- GDP per capita growth: 3.6% (2025)
- GDP by sector: Agriculture: 7.9%; Industry: 28.3%; Services: 63.8%; (2025)
- GDP by component: Household consumption 72.6%; Government consumption 15.1%; Gross capital formation 22.2%; Exports of goods and services 27.7%; Less: Imports of goods and services 37.7%; Other source 14.4%; (2025)
- Inflation (CPI): ▲7.8% (October 2026)
- Population below national poverty line: ▼9.7% (National, 2025); ▼16.9% on less than $4.20/day (2023)
- Gini coefficient: ▼39.3 medium (2023)
- Human Development Index: ▲0.720 high (2023, 117th); ▲0.597 medium (2023, IHDI)
- Corruption Perceptions Index: ▼33 out of 100 points (2024, 114th rank)
- Labor force: ▲50.32 million; ▲64.5% participation rate; (September 2026 est.)
- Labor force by occupation: Agriculture: 20.7%; Industry: 17.1%; Services: 62.2%; (September 2026 est.)
- Unemployment: ▲5.4%; ▲2.86 million unemployed; (September 2026 est.)
- Average gross salary: ₱21,544 / US$376 monthly (2024)
- Average net salary: ₱20,559 / US$358 monthly (2024)
- Gross savings: ▲ ₱8.40 trillion (2025)
- Main industries: Electronics assembly; aerospace/parts; agribusiness; automotive/parts; IT and business process outsourcing; food processing; furnitures; pharmaceuticals; petrochemicals; metal casting and mining; shipbuilding; textile; tourism

External
- Exports: $116.52 billion (2023) (Note: Goods and services at current prices.)
- Export goods: Electronic products 54.3%; Agricultural products 11.0%; Manufactured goods 7.3%; Mineral products 4.5%; Machinery and Transport equipment 4.3%; Ignition wirings 3.2%; Other 15.4% (2025)
- Main export partners: United States 15.9%; Hong Kong 14.6%; ASEAN 14.0%; Japan 13.7%; European Union 11.6%; China 11.0%; Other 19.2% (2025)
- Imports: $159.29 billion (2022)
- Import goods: Electronic products 23.9%; Agricultural products 15.2%; Mineral products 12.4%; Transport equipment 9.4% Industrial machinery 4.8%; Iron and steel 3.6%; Other 30.7% (2025)
- Main import partners: China 28.6%; ASEAN 26.4%; Japan 7.9%; South Korea 7.9%; European Union 6.2%; United States 6.1%; Other 16.9% (2025)
- FDI stock: ▲$134.57 billion (Inward, 2025); ▲$74.41 billion (Outward, 2025)
- Current account: ▼ -$16.91 billion; ▼ -3.3% of GDP (2025)
- Gross external debt: ▲$147.65 billion; ▲30.3% of GDP (2025p)

Public finance
- Government debt: ₱17.71 trillion; ▲63.2% of GDP (2025)
- Foreign reserves: ▼$97.35 billion (October 2026)
- Budget balance: -₱1.57 trillion; −5.6% of GDP (2025)
- Revenue: ₱4.45 trillion; 15.9% of GDP (2025)
- Spending: ₱6.03 trillion; 21.5% of GDP (2025)
- Economic aid: recipient: ▲$41.84 billion (2025) (Note: Active ODA)
- Credit rating: Japan Credit Rating Agency (2025): A− (Domestic/Foreign); A− (Bonds); Outlook: Stable; Standard & Poor's: BBB+ (Domestic/Foreign); BBB+ (T&C Assessment); Outlook: Stable; Moody's: Baa2; Outlook: Stable; Fitch: BBB (Domestic/Foreign); BBB+ (Country Ceiling); Outlook: Negative
- All values, unless otherwise stated, are in US dollars.

The economy of the Philippines is an emerging market, and considered as a newly industrialized country in the Asia-Pacific region. In 2026, the Philippine economy is estimated to be at ₱30.22 trillion ($512.22 billion), making it the world's 35th largest by nominal GDP and 14th largest in Asia according to the International Monetary Fund.

The Philippine economy is a service-oriented economy, with relatively more modest contributions from the manufacturing and agriculture sectors. It has experienced significant economic growth and transformation in the past, posting one of the highest GDP growth rates in Asia. With an average annual growth rate of around 6 percent since 2010, the country has emerged as one of the fastest-growing economies in the world. The Philippines is a founding member of the United Nations, Association of Southeast Asian Nations, Asia-Pacific Economic Cooperation, East Asia Summit and the World Trade Organization. The Asian Development Bank (ADB) is headquartered in the Ortigas Center located in the city of Mandaluyong, Metro Manila.

The country's primary exports include semiconductors and electronic products, transport equipment, garments, chemical products, copper, nickel, abaca, coconut oil, and fruits. Its major trading partners include Japan, China, the United States, Singapore, South Korea, the Netherlands, Hong Kong, Germany, Taiwan, and Thailand. In 2017, the Philippine economy was projected to become the 9th largest in Asia and 19th largest in the world by 2050. By 2035, the Filipino economy is predicted to be the 22nd largest in the world.

The Philippines has been named as one of the Tiger Cub Economies, alongside Indonesia, Malaysia, Vietnam, and Thailand. However, major problems remain, mainly related to alleviating the wide income and growth disparities between the country's different regions and socioeconomic classes, reducing corruption, and investing in the infrastructure necessary to ensure future growth. In 2024, the World Economic Forum chief Børge Brende said that "there is a real opportunity for this country to become a $2-trillion economy."

The Philippines exhibits one of the highest economic densities in Southeast Asia, characterized by a high concentration of economic output relative to its land area. As of 2024–2025, the Philippines ranks third among ASEAN nations in GDP Density (Nominal GDP per square kilometer), trailing only the city-state of Singapore and the resource-rich sultanate of Brunei. This is so, because there is such large economic activity that is happening on such low amount of land area that's scattered amongst a fragmented archipelagic geography. This is expressed in the concept called GDP density.

In 2025, the Philippines enacted Republic Act No. 12252, amending the Investors’ Lease Act to allow foreign investors to lease private land for up to 99 years, up from the previous limit of 75 years (50 + 25 extension). This reform aims to enhance the country's competitiveness in attracting long-term foreign direct investment by offering greater leasehold security for commercial and industrial projects. A project called the "Luzon Economic Corridor" is on the works, which will further develop the Philippine economy. It is the first country in the world to put its entire national budget under blockchain technology.

== Composition by sector ==
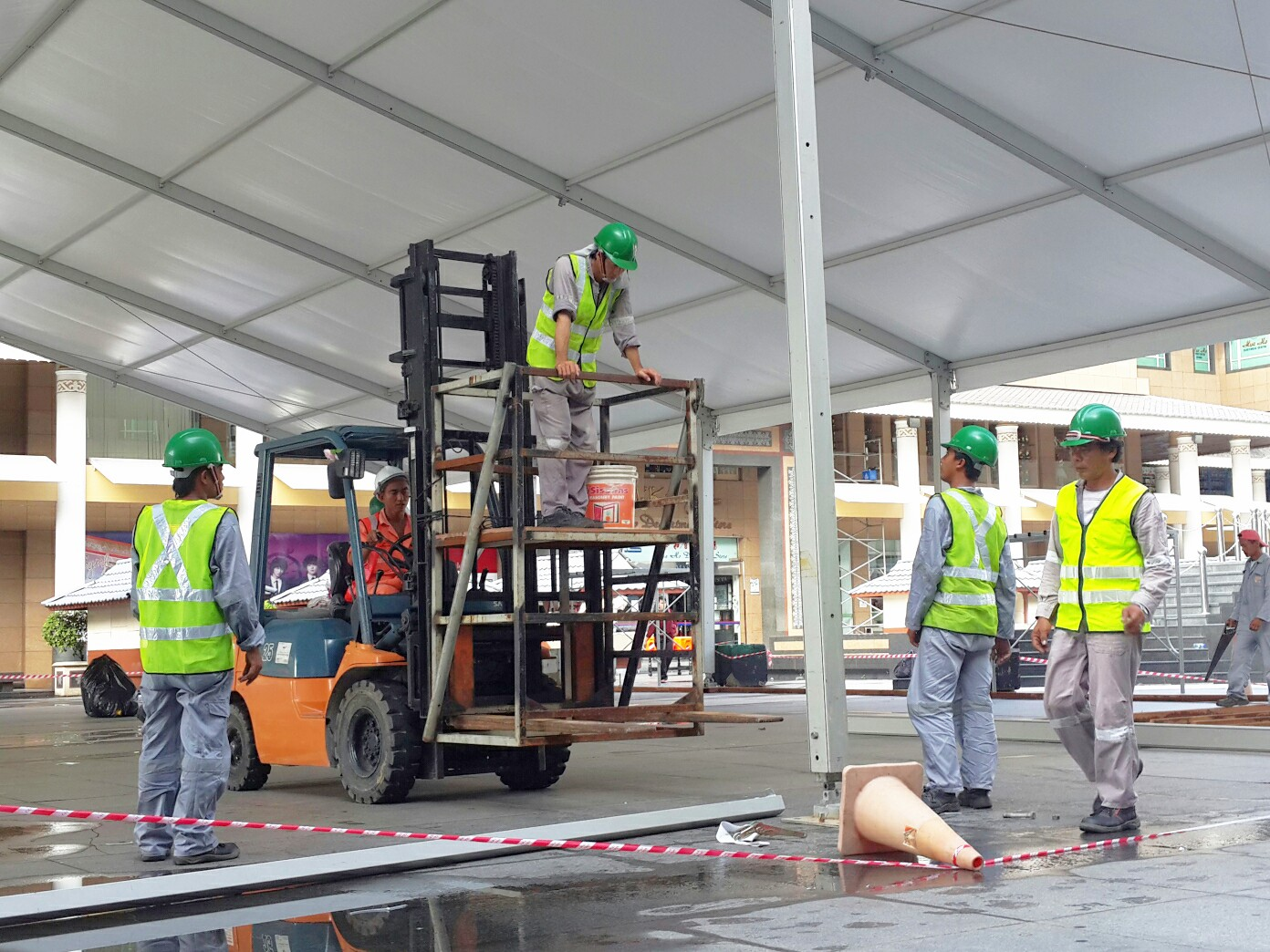
Filipino men at work in Brunei

As a newly industrialized country, the Philippines is still an economy with a large agricultural sector; however, the country's service industry has expanded recently. Much of the industrial sector is based on processing and assembly operations in the manufacturing of electronics and other high-tech components, usually from foreign multinational corporations.

Filipinos who go abroad to work–-known as Overseas Filipino Workers or OFWs—are a significant contributor to the economy but are not reflected in the below sectoral discussion of the domestic economy. OFW remittances is also credited for the Philippines' recent economic growth resulting in investment status upgrades from credit ratings agencies such as the Fitch Group and Standard & Poor's. From more than US$2 billion worth of remittance from Overseas Filipinos sent to the Philippines in 1994, this significantly increased to a record US$38.34 billion in 2024 and represented 8.3 percent of the country's GDP.

=== Agriculture, aquaculture and forestry ===
As of 2022, agriculture employs 24 percent of the Filipino workforce accounting for 8.9 percent of the total GDP. The type of activity ranges from small subsistence farming and fishing to large commercial ventures with significant export focus.

The Philippines is the world's third largest producer of coconuts, and the world's largest exporter of coconut products. Coconut production is generally concentrated in medium-sized farms. The Philippines is also the world's third largest producer of pineapples, producing 2,862,000 metric tons (2,817,000 long tons; 3,155,000 short tons) in 2021.

Rice production in the Philippines is important to the food supply in the country and economy. The Philippines is the 7th largest rice producer in the world as of the 1st half of 2026, accounting for 2 percent of global rice production. Rice is the most important food crop, a staple food in most of the country; it is produced extensively in Central Luzon), Western Visayas, Cagayan Valley, Soccsksargen, and Ilocos Region.

The Philippines is one of the largest producers of sugar in the world. At least 17 provinces located in eight regions of the nation have grown sugarcane crops, of which the Negros Island Region accounts for half of the country's total production. As of Crop Year 2012–2013, 29 mills are operational divided as follows: 13 mills in Negros, 6 mills in Luzon, 4 mills in Panay, 3 mills in Eastern Visayas and 3 mills in Mindanao. A range from 360,000 to 390,000 hectares (890,000 to 960,000 acres) are devoted to sugarcane production. The largest sugarcane areas are found in the Negros Island Region, which accounts for 51 percent of sugarcane areas planted. This is followed by Mindanao which accounts for 20 percent; Luzon with 17 percent; Panay with 7 percent and Eastern Visayas with 4 percent.

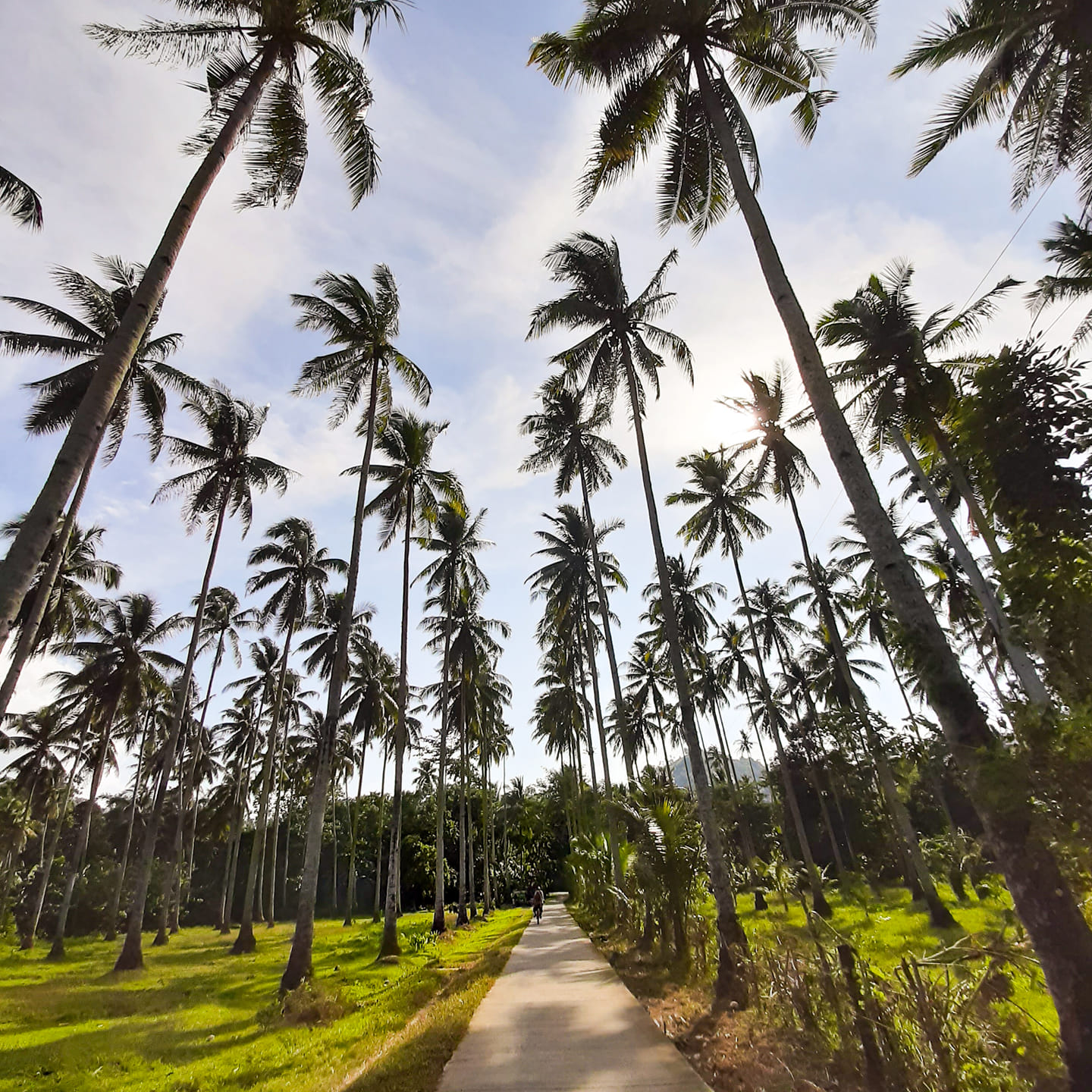
A coconut grove in Dapitan

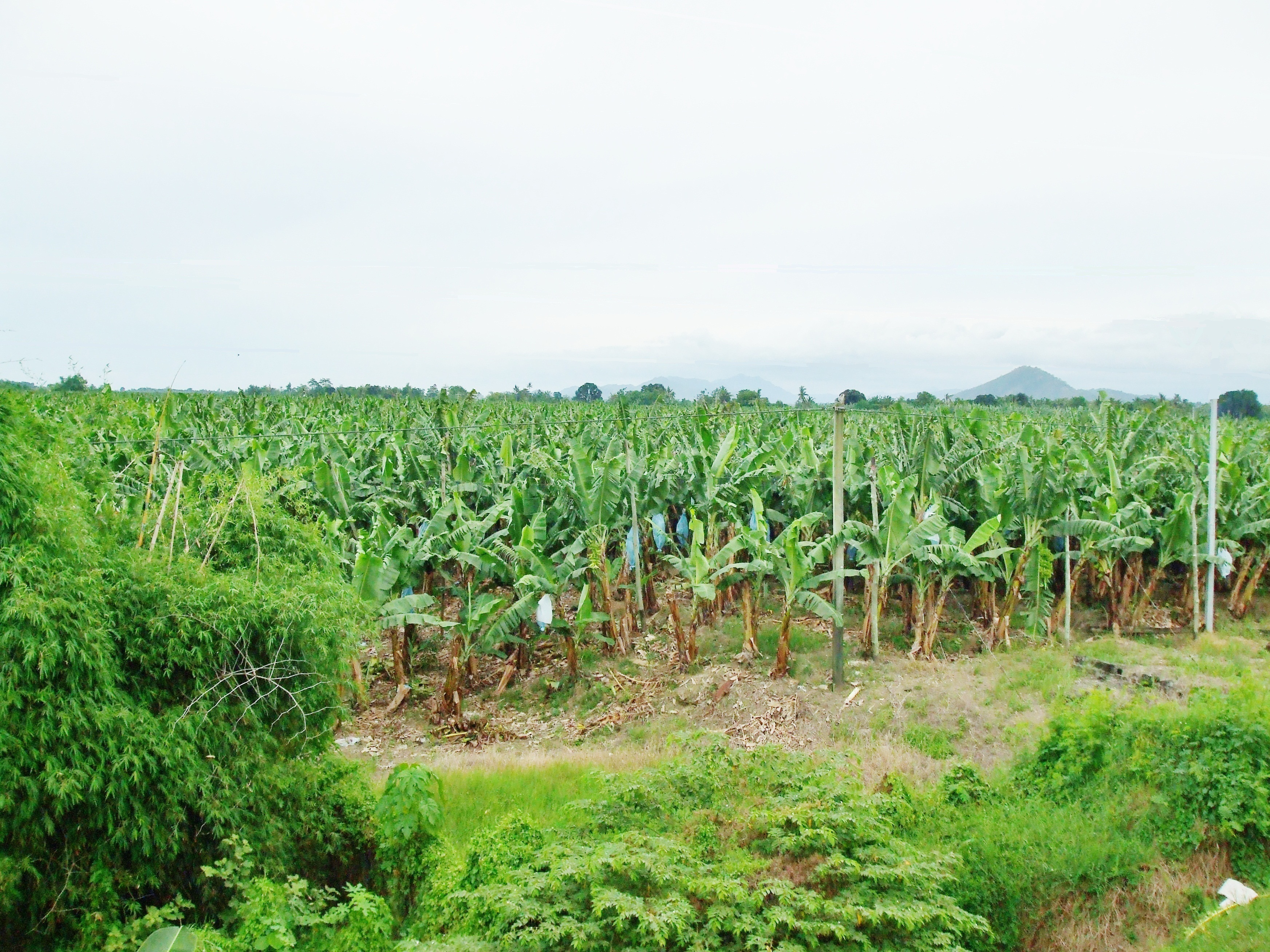
A banana plantation in Padada

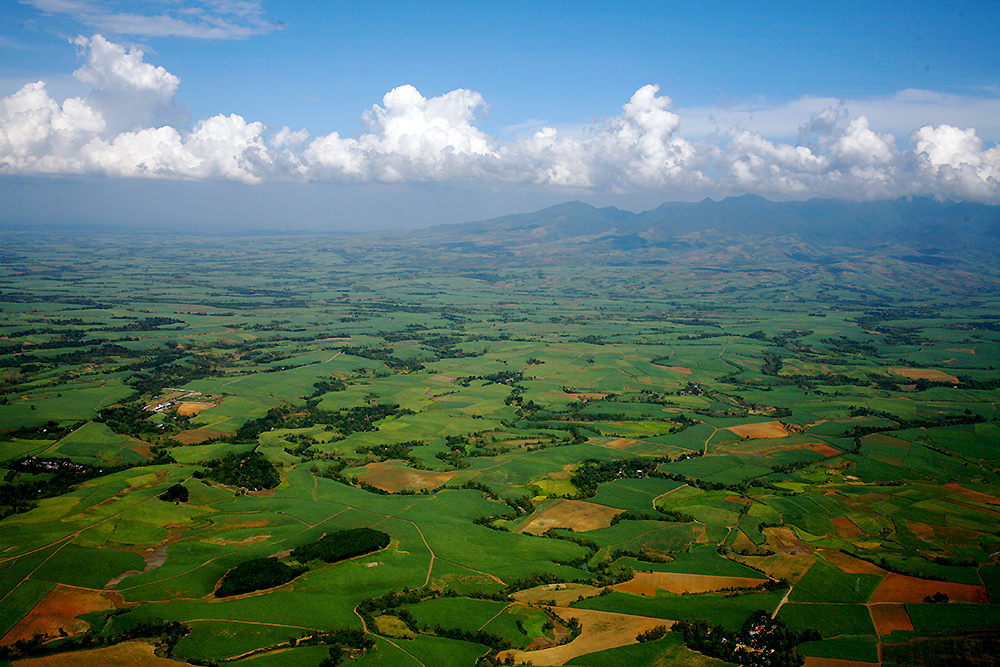
Vast sugarcane plantations in Bacolod

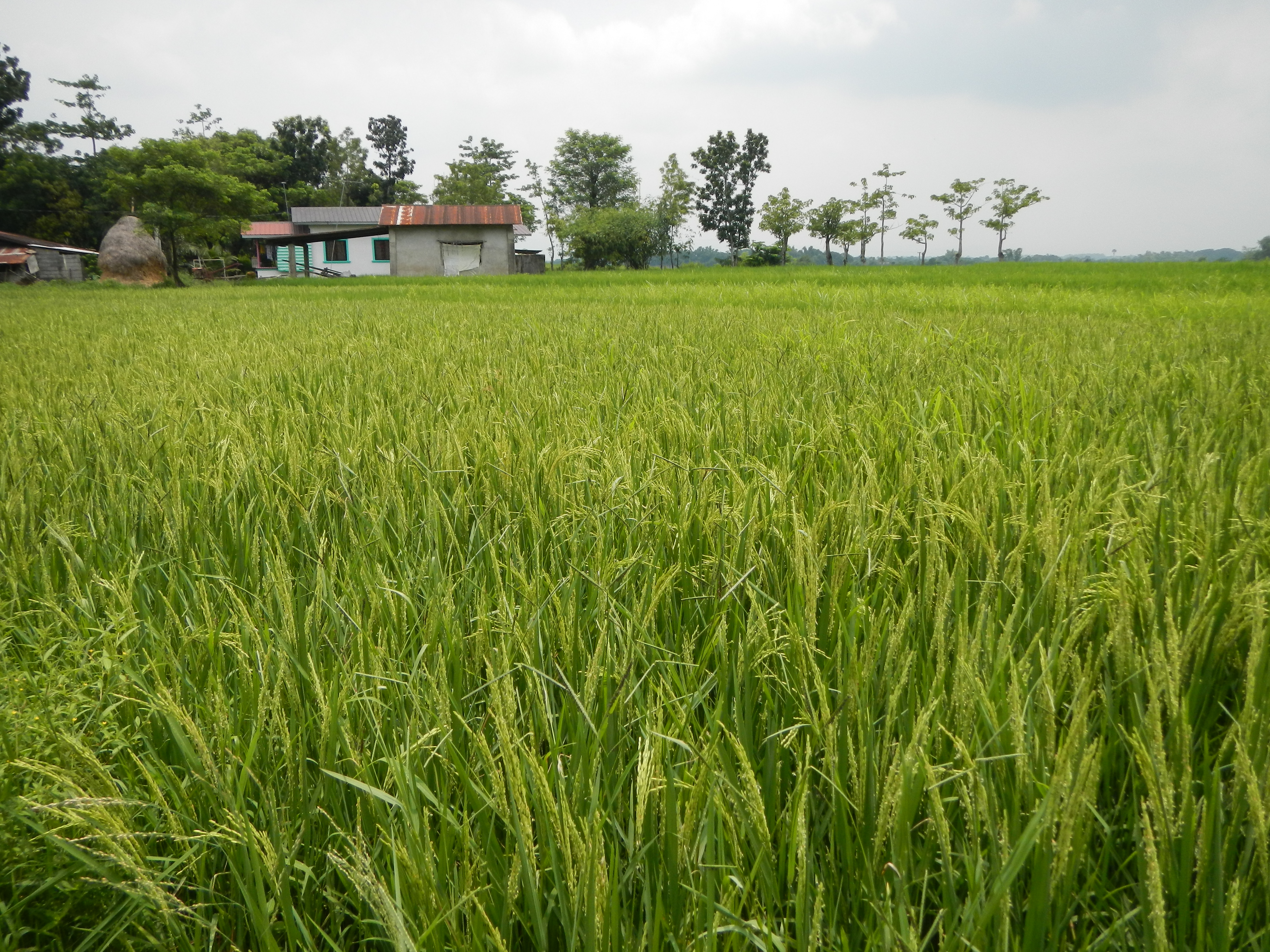
A rice field in Bulacan

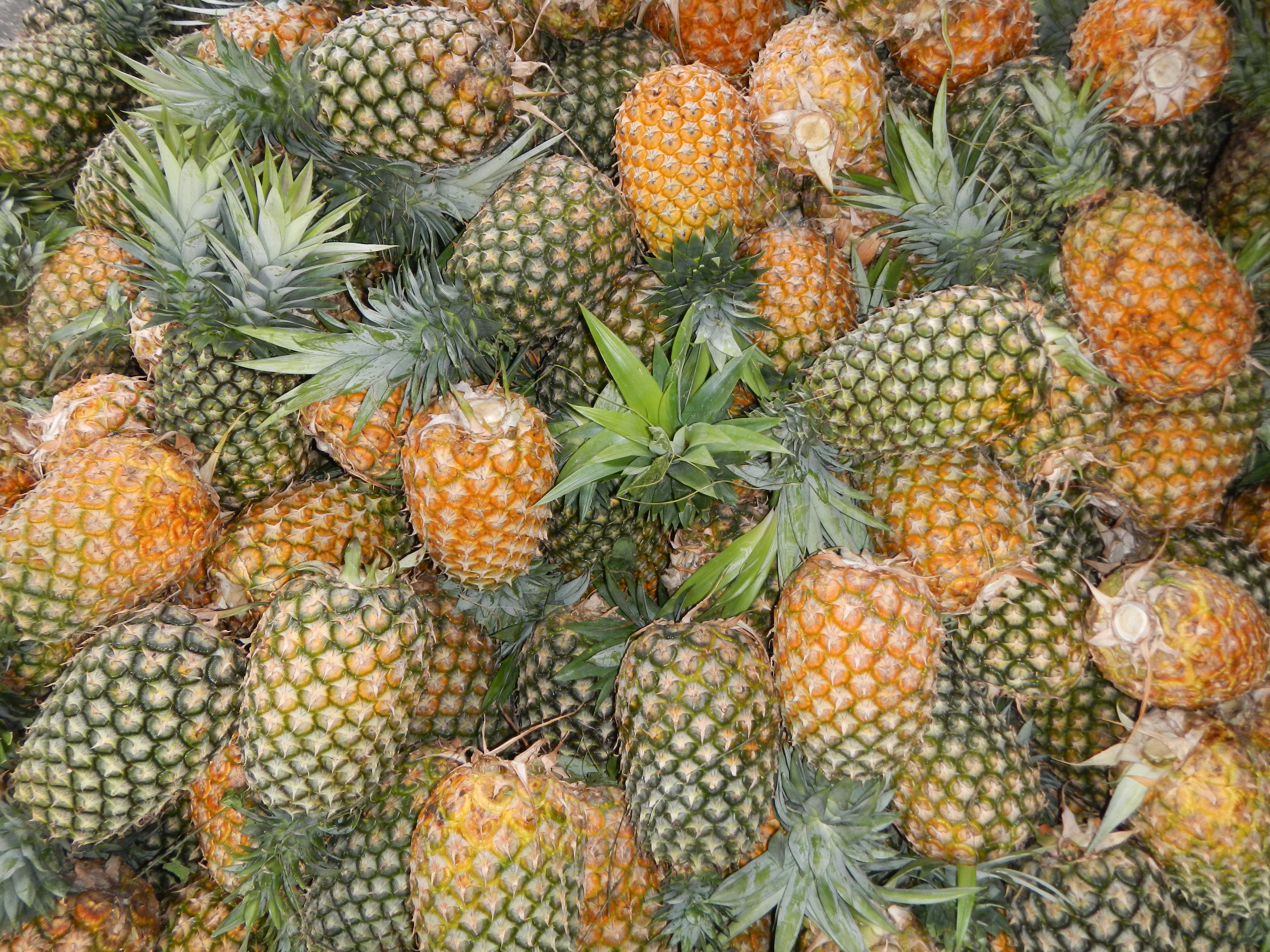
Pineapples in a market in Laguna

=== Blue economy ===
As an archipelagic country, the Philippines relies heavily on the blue economy. Its main ocean-based sectors are fisheries, shipping, offshore renewable energy, and marine tourism. The blue economy made up nearly 4 percent of the country's gross domestic product (PHP1 trillion) in 2024. Although important for the country's economic growth, only 2 percent of the development aid the country receives is directed to the blue economy.

Mangrove forests, which cover more than 1% of the country's land area, provide a wide range of benefits its coastal communities and blue economy. By providing food and shelter, mangroves function as breeding and nursery grounds for fish. In effect, this leads to a higher abundance of fish, crustaceans, and shellfish around these areas which local small-scale fisheries rely on for food and livelihood. Mangrove forests also help mitigate climate change by absorbing carbon from the atmosphere, and offer locals protection from natural hazards such as tropical cyclones, and reduce coastal erosion by strengthening the soil. 22% of mangroves in the Philippines can be found in Palawan where local livelihoods rely on them as fishing grounds, for harvesting mangrove honey, and as a site for ecotourism.

=== Automotive and aerospace ===
The ABS used in Mercedes-Benz, BMW, and Volvo cars are made in the Philippines. Automotive sales in the Philippines increased to 467,252 in 2024 from 429,807 units a year prior. Toyota sells the most vehicles in the country followed by Mitsubishi, Ford, Nissan, and Suzuki. Honda and Suzuki produce motorcycles in the country. Since around the 2010s, several Chinese car brands have entered the Philippine market; these include Chery and Foton Motor.

Aerospace products in the Philippines are mainly for the export market and include manufacturing parts for aircraft built by both Boeing and Airbus. Moog is the biggest aerospace manufacturer with base in Baguio; the company produces aircraft actuators in their manufacturing facility. Total export output of aerospace products in the Philippines reached US$780 million in 2019.

=== Electronics ===
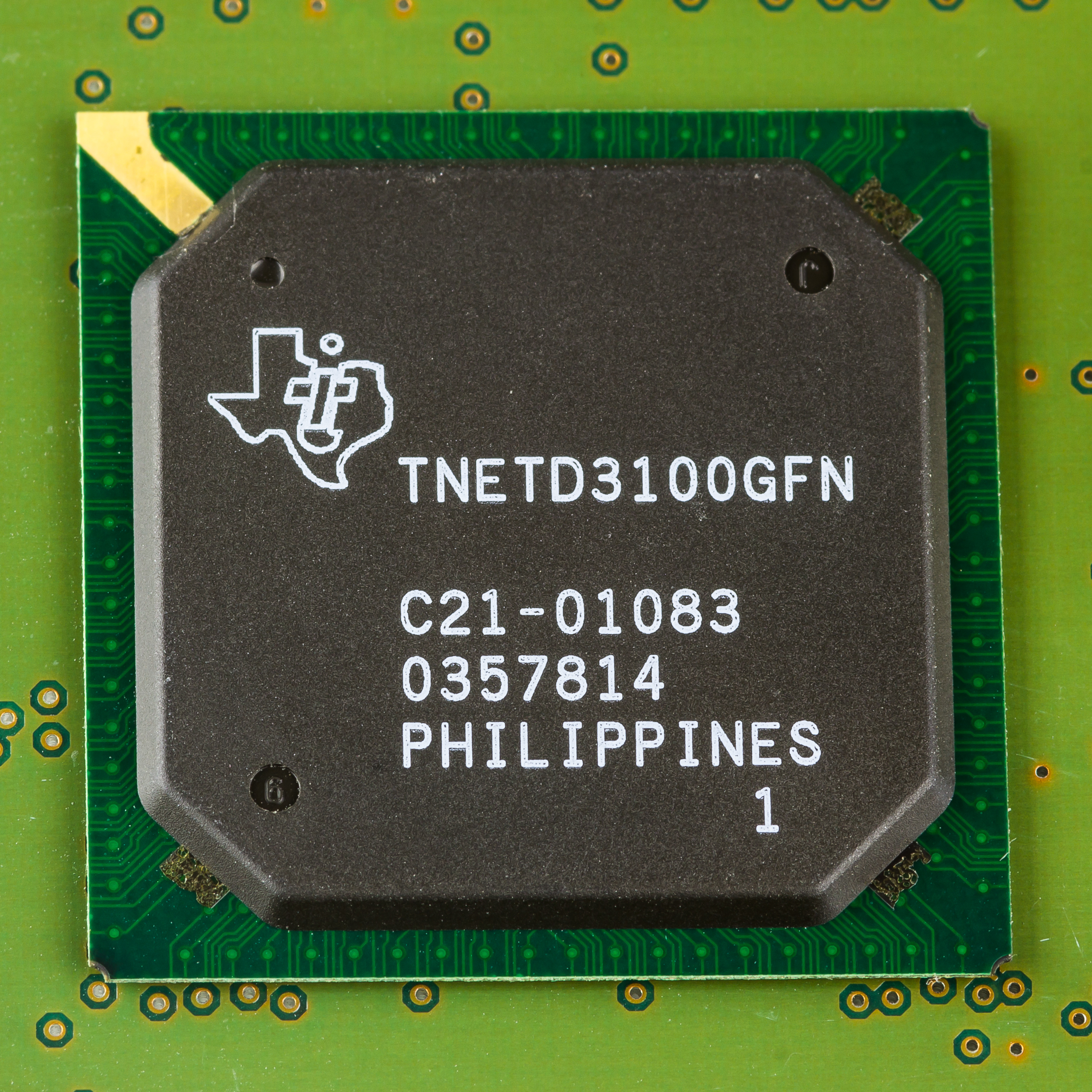
A Texas Instruments integrated circuit

A Texas Instruments plant in Baguio has been operating for 20 years and is the largest producer of DSP chips in the world. Texas Instruments' Baguio plant produces all the chips used in Nokia cell phones and 80% of chips used in Ericsson cell phones in the world. Toshiba hard disk drives are manufactured in Santa Rosa, Laguna. Printer manufacturer Lexmark has a factory in Cebu City. Electronics and other light industries are concentrated in Laguna, Cavite, Batangas and other Calabarzon provinces with sizable numbers found in Southern Philippines that account for most of the country's export.

The Philippine Electronics Industry is classified into (73%) Semiconductor Manufacturing Services (SMS) and (27%) Electronics Manufacturing Services (EMS) according to SEIPI, the largest organization of foreign and Filipino electronics companies in the Philippines. Electronic products continued to be the country's top export with total earnings of US$45.66 billion and accounted for 57.8 percent of the total export of goods in 2022.

==== Semiconductor ====
The semiconductor industry plays a critical role in the Philippine economy by integrating the Philippines into the global electronics value chain. The country is primarily involved in the assembly, testing, and packaging stages of semiconductor production rather than chip design or wafer fabrication, serving as a key link in the global supply chain for electronic components.

According to the Semiconductor and Electronics Industries in the Philippines Foundation (SEIPI), semiconductor manufacturing services account for the majority of the country’s electronics industry output. Semiconductor products are widely used in consumer electronics, telecommunications equipment, automotive systems, and industrial applications.

Semiconductor manufacturing facilities in the Philippines are largely operated by multinational firms and are concentrated in major industrial zones, particularly in the CALABARZON region as well as parts of Central Luzon and the Visayas. The industry benefits from a skilled technical workforce, competitive production costs, and government investment incentives.

As part of the broader electronics sector, semiconductors contribute significantly to export earnings, employment generation, and foreign direct investment. The industry also supports technology transfer and skills development, reinforcing its role as one of the Philippines’ most important high-technology manufacturing sectors.

=== Mining and extraction ===
Philippine gold, nickel, copper, palladium and chromite deposits are among the largest in the world. Other important minerals include silver, coal, gypsum, and sulphur. Significant deposits of clay, limestone, marble, silica, and phosphate exist.

About 60 percent of total mining production are accounted for by non-metallic minerals, which contributed substantially to the industry's steady output growth between 1993 and 1998, with the value of production growing 58 percent. Philippine mineral exports amounted to US$4.22 billion in 2020. Low metal prices, high production costs, lack of investment in infrastructure, and a challenge to the new mining law have contributed to the mining industry's overall decline.

The industry rebounded starting in late 2004 when the Supreme Court upheld the constitutionality of an important law permitting foreign ownership of Philippines mining companies. In 2019, the country was the 2nd largest world producer of nickel and the 4th largest world producer of cobalt. According to Philippine Statistics Authority, the total monetary value of four key metallic minerals which were appraised to Class A namely: copper, chromite, gold and nickel were valued at US$10.23 billion in 2025. Class A mineral resources are commercially recoverable that could contribute to economy annually.

=== Offshoring and outsourcing ===
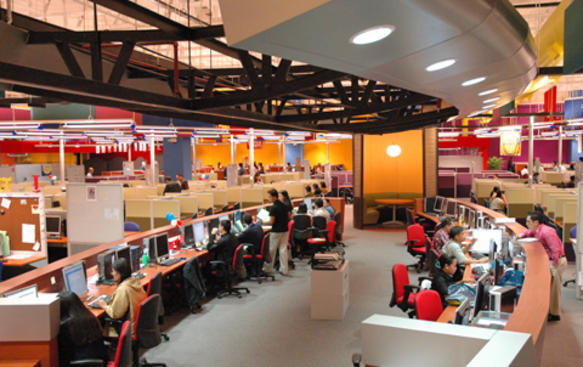
A business process outsourcing office in Cainta, Rizal

The Cebu IT Park in Cebu City

Business process outsourcing (BPO) and the call center industry contribute to the Philippines' economic growth resulting in investment status upgrades from credit ratings agencies such as Fitch and S&P. In 2008, the Philippines has surpassed India as the world leader in business process outsourcing (BPO). The industry generated 100,000 jobs, and total revenues were placed at US$960 million for 2005. In 2011, BPO sector employment ballooned to over 700,000 people and is contributing to a growing middle class; this increased to around 1.3 million employees by 2022. BPO facilities are concentrated in IT parks and centers in economic zones across the Philippines: Metro Manila, Metro Cebu, Metro Clark, Bacolod, Davao City, and Iloilo City; other areas with significant presence of the BPO industry include Baguio, Cagayan de Oro, Dasmariñas, Dumaguete, Lipa, Naga, and Santa Rosa, Laguna. The majority of the top ten BPO firms of the United States operate in the Philippines.

Call centers began in the Philippines as plain providers of email response and managing services and is a major source of employment. Call center services include customer relations, ranging from travel services, technical support, education, customer care, financial services, online business to customer support, and online business-to-business support. The Philippines is considered as a location of choice due to its many outsourcing benefits such as less expensive operational and labor costs, the high proficiency in spoken English of a significant number of its people, and a highly educated labor pool.

The growth in the BPO industry is promoted by the Philippine government. The industry is highlighted by the Philippines Development Plan as among the 10 high potential and priority development areas. The government provides incentive programs such as tax holidays, tax exemptions, and simplified export and import procedures. Additionally, training is also available for BPO applicants.

=== Shipbuilding and repair ===
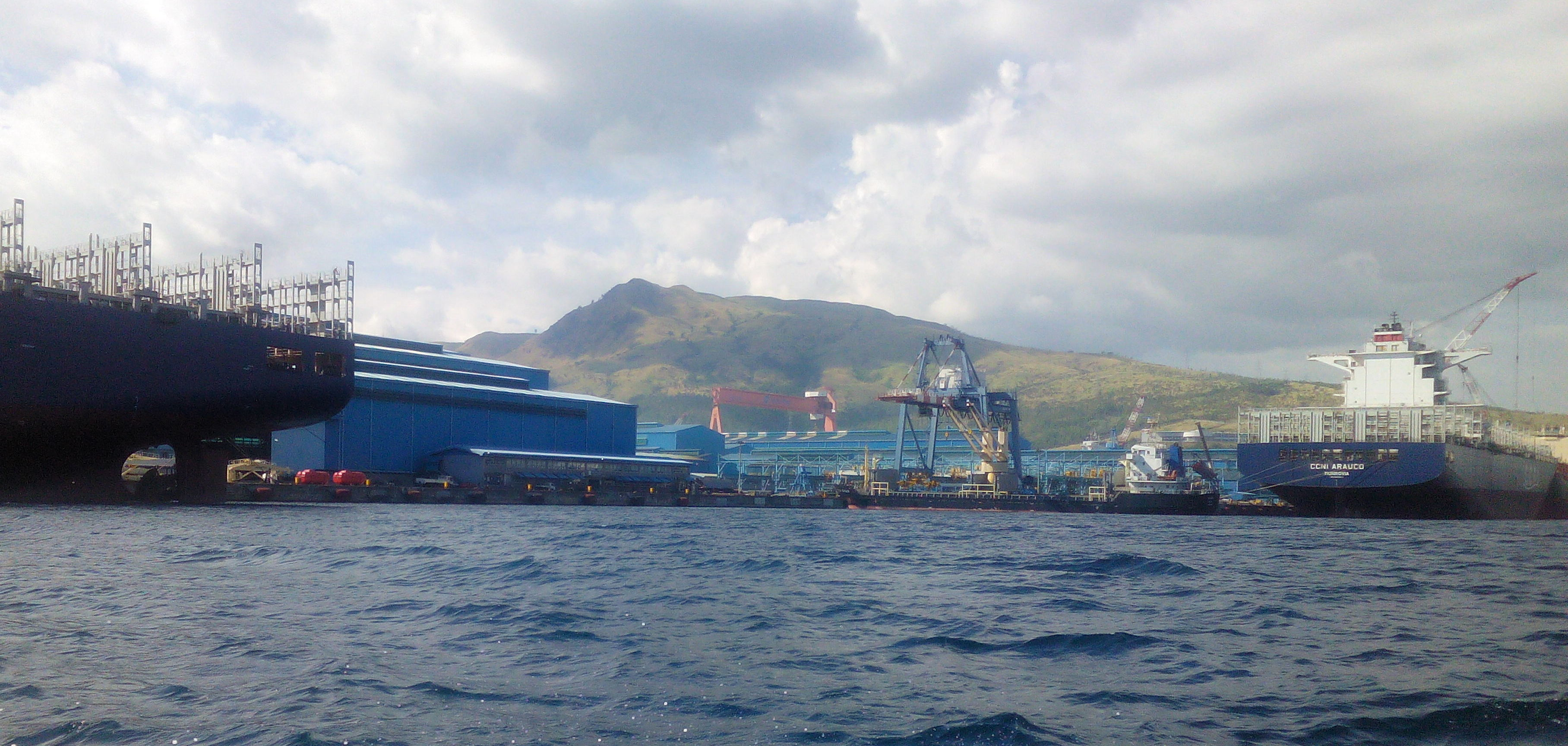
Hanjin Subic Shipyard in Subic, Zambales

The Philippines is a significant player in the global shipbuilding industry with 118 registered shipyards in 2021 distributed in Subic, Cebu, Bataan, Navotas and Batangas. As of 2022, it is the seventh largest shipbuilding nation by gross tonnage. Subic-made cargo vessels are exported to countries where shipping operators are based. South Korea's Hanjin started production in Subic in 2007 of the 20 ships ordered by German and Greek shipping operators. Bulk carriers, container ships and big passenger ferries are built in the country's shipyards. General Santos' shipyard is mainly for ship repair and maintenance.

Surrounded by waters, the country has abundant natural deep-sea ports ideal for development as production, construction and repair sites. In the ship repair sector, the Navotas complex in Metro Manila is expected to accommodate 96 vessels for repair. Shipbuilding is part of Philippines' maritime heritage; employing over 600,000 people and contributing almost 15 percent of revenues to the ocean-based industries.

=== Construction and real estate ===
The Community Mortgage Program is a Philippine socialized housing initiative intended to improve access to secure land tenure for low-income and underprivileged communities. By 2001, the program had provided secure tenure to 106,273 families. The initiative forms part of the country's efforts to address inequalities in housing access and improve housing security among disadvantaged Filipinos.

=== Education ===
Education in the Philippines is compulsory at the basic education level, composed of kindergarten, elementary school (grades 1–6), junior high school (grades 7–10), and senior high school (grades 11–12). The educational system is managed by three government agencies by level of education: the Department of Education (DepEd) for basic education; the Commission on Higher Education (CHED) for higher education; and the Technical Education and Skills Development Authority (TESDA) for technical and vocational education. Public education is funded by the national government.

Private schools are generally free to determine their curriculum in accordance with existing laws and regulations. Institutions of higher education are classified as public or private; public institutions are subdivided into state universities and colleges (SUCs) and local colleges and universities (LCUs).

Enrollment in basic education has increased steadily since the effectivity of the K-12 curriculum, first implemented on May 20, 2008, through its 9 years of implementation until June 5, 2017, on April 24, 2012, with over 28 million students enrolled in the 2022–2023 school year. In 2020, there were approximately 32 million learners aged 5 to 24 enrolled nationwide. An additional 640,000 out-of-school youth participated in the Alternative Learning System, while 1.6 million children aged 5 to 17 remained out of school as of 2023. Completion rates for primary and lower secondary education are relatively high, but drop-out rates and barriers to upper secondary and tertiary education remain, particularly among lower-income students.

=== Healthcare ===
Health care in the Philippines varies with private, public and barangay health centers (many in rural municipalities). Most of the national burden of health care is provided by private health providers, with the cost shouldered by the state or by patients. The Philippine healthcare system, a blend of public and private sectors, faces challenges in providing equitable and comprehensive care. Historically rooted in traditional medicine and shaped by colonial influences, the system now navigates a landscape where private providers shoulder much of the burden, with costs borne by the state or patients. Despite the UHC Act's intent to improve care for all, the system remains fragmented, with significant disparities in service quality and quantity between the wealthy and the poor. Factors contributing to this include low budgets, personnel shortages exacerbated by nurse migration, and historical neglect of underserved populations. Compared to developed nations, the Philippines allocates a comparatively small percentage of its GDP to healthcare. Addressing these challenges remains a priority for the nation.

=== Tourism ===
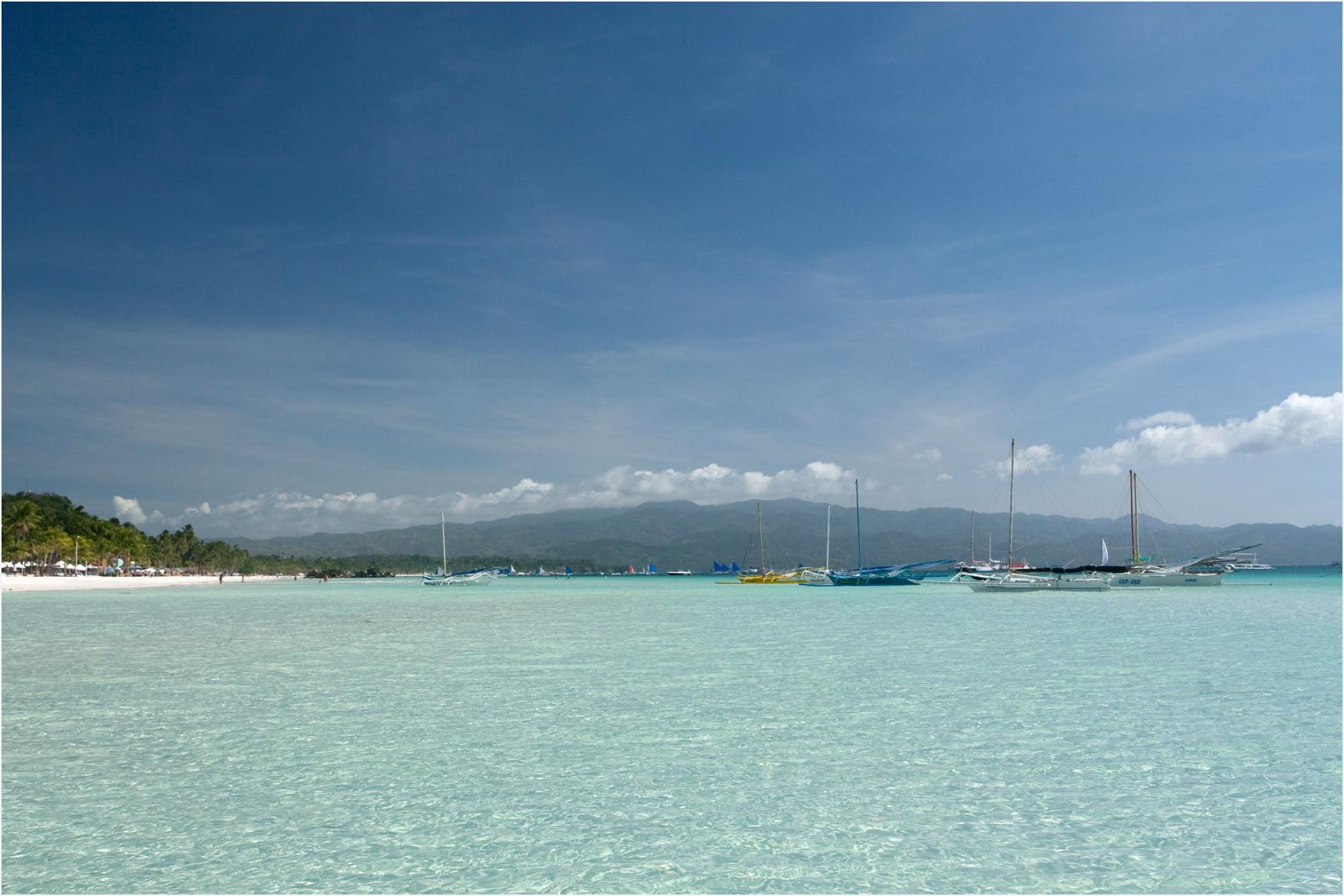
Boracay white beach

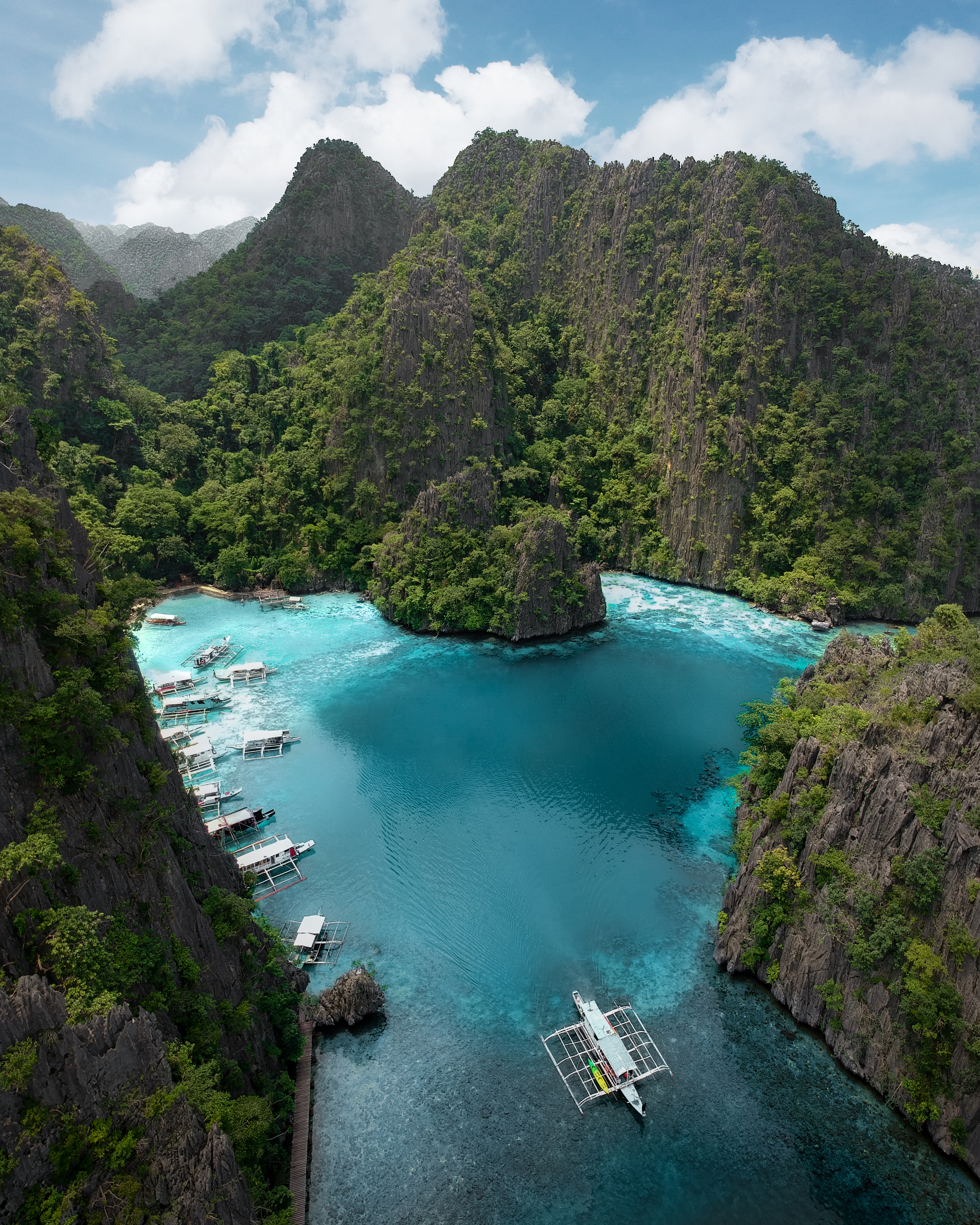
Palawan, which includes Coron, is a UNESCO Biosphere Reserve.

Tourism is an important sector for the Philippine economy. The travel and tourism industry contributed 8.1% to the country's GDP in 2025; this was lower than the 12.7% recorded in 2019 prior to the COVID-19 lockdowns. Coastal tourism, encompassing beach and diving activities, constitutes 25% of the Philippines' tourism revenue, serving as its primary income source in the sector. Popular destinations among tourists include Boracay, Palawan, Cebu and Siargao. While the Philippines has encountered political and social challenges that have affected its tourism industry, the country has also taken steps to address these issues. Over the past years, there have been efforts to improve political stability, enhance security measures, and promote social inclusivity, all of which contribute to creating a more favorable environment for tourism, such as the Boracay rehabilitation.

As of 2025, 7.70 million Filipinos were employed in the tourism industry, it generated ₱2.27 trillion (US$44.1 billion) in revenue from foreign tourists, coming mostly from South Korea, the United States and Japan. The country attracted a total of 5,360,682 foreign visitors in 2015 through its tourism campaign of It's More Fun in the Philippines! In 2019, foreign arrivals peaked at 8,260,913.The country is also home to one of the New 7 Wonders of Nature, the Puerto Princesa Subterranean River National Park, and one of the New 7 Wonders Cities, the Heritage City of Vigan. It is also home to six UNESCO World Heritage Sites scattered in nine different locations, three UNESCO biosphere reserves, three UNESCO intangible cultural heritage, four UNESCO memory of the world documentary heritage, three UNESCO creative cities, two UNESCO World Heritage cities, seven Ramsar wetland sites, and 14 ASEAN Heritage Parks.

== Infrastructure ==
=== Energy ===
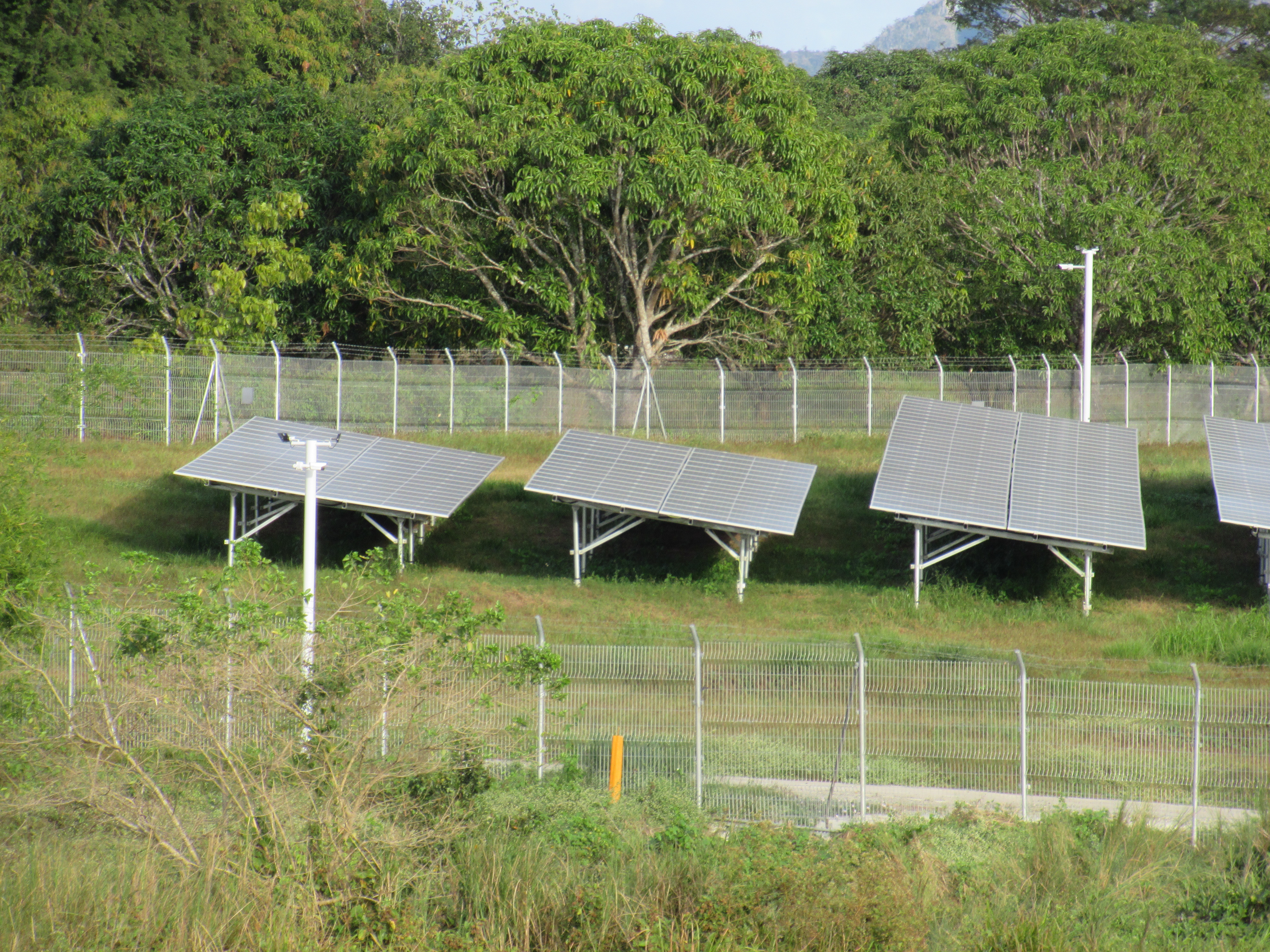
Solar module installation in Bulacan

The Philippines relies on a mix of fossil fuels and renewable resources for its energy needs. Electricity demand is driven by population growth, urbanisation and industry. Energy policy and planning are overseen by the Department of Energy. Usage patterns vary across Luzon, the Visayas and Mindanao, reflecting differences in generation assets, grid interconnections and local demand.

The population of the Philippines is over 101 million people, and as a rapidly developing nation, has seen a rapid increase in GDP, averaging 6.1% from 2011 to 2015. Energy-intensive manufacturing and retail industries are the driving factors of the Philippines' economic growth. Given its large population and rapidly growing economy, the country's energy needs are growing rapidly. According to the Philippines Department of Energy, the Philippines consumed 75,266 gigawatt-hours (GWh) of electricity in 2013. Of this, 27.39% went to powering residential areas, 24.31% to commercial establishments and 27.46% to the industrial sector. With 72.84% of electrical energy being consumed by Luzon, 14.75% by Visayas, and 12.41% by Mindanao in 2013.

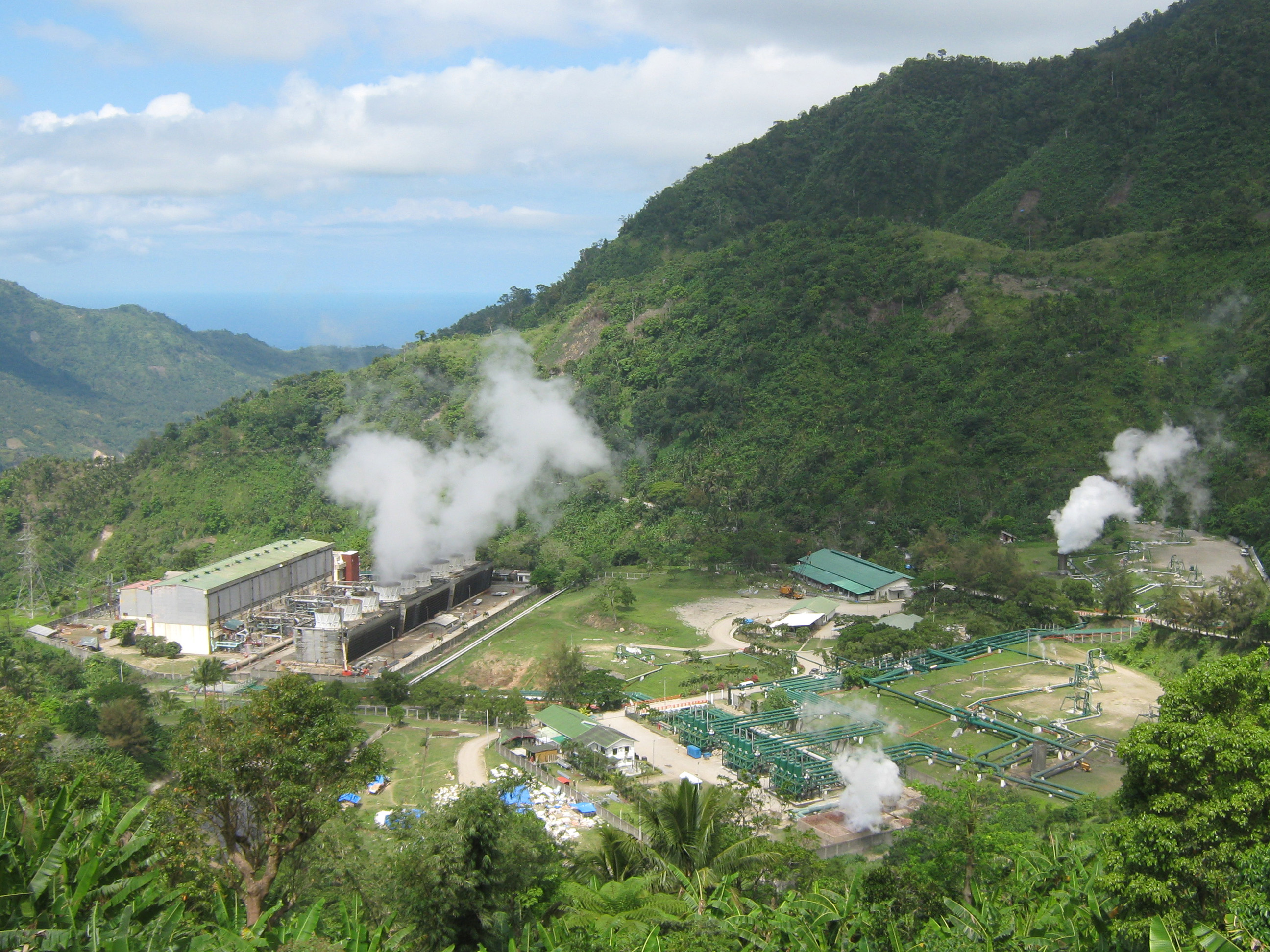
Geothermal power station in Negros Oriental

The Philippines is rich in mineral and geothermal energy resources. In 2019, it produced 1,928 megawatts (2,585,000 hp) of electricity from geothermal sources (7.55% of total electricity production). A 1989 discovery of natural gas reserves in the Malampaya oil fields off the island of Palawan is being used to generate electricity in three gas-powered plants.

The Philippines has significant potential in solar energy; however, as of 2021, most of the domestically produced electricity is based on fossil fuel resources, particularly coal. The country produced 7,399 megawatts (9,922,000 hp) of renewable energy in 2019.

On November 15, 2022, the renewable energy sector was granted the ability to operate with 100 percent foreign ownership, an increase from the previous 40 percent limit. This change allows for the infusion of foreign capital into the renewable energy (RE) industries. The Department of Energy is targeting an increase in the share of renewable energy in the country's power generation mix, aiming for 35 percent by 2030 and 50 percent by 2040, up from the current 22 percent. Danish firm Copenhagen Infrastructure Partners (CIP) is investing US$5 billion to develop three offshore wind energy projects with a potential capacity of 2,000 megawatts (2,700,000 hp); it will be located in Camarines Norte and Camarines Sur (1000 MW), Northern Samar (650 MW), Pangasinan and La Union (350 MW). In 2022, the share of RE in the energy mix was at 22.8 percent.

The electricity sector in the Philippines provides electricity through power generation, transmission, and distribution to many parts of the country. The Philippines is divided into three electrical grids, one each for Luzon, the Visayas and Mindanao.

As of June 2016, the total installed capacity in the Philippines was 20,055 megawatts (MW), of which 71.5% was on the Luzon grid. About 12% of Filipinos have no access to electricity. The Philippines is also one of the countries in the world that has a fully functioning electricity market since 2006 called the Philippine Wholesale Electricity Spot Market (WESM) and is operated by an independent market operator. By 2017, coal-powered electric energy began to comprise more than 50% of the nationwide power generation in the country.

As of 2025, the Philippines has the second-highest electricity rate in Southeast Asia after Singapore.

=== Telecommunications ===
Telecommunications in the Philippines are well-developed due to the presence of modern infrastructure facilities. The industry was deregulated in 1995 when President Fidel V. Ramos signed Republic Act No. 7925 (The Public Telecommunications Policy Act of the Philippines). This law opened the sector to more private players and improved the provision of telecom services are better and fairer rates, leading to the creation of many telecommunication service providers for mobile, fixed-line, Internet and other services.

=== Transport ===
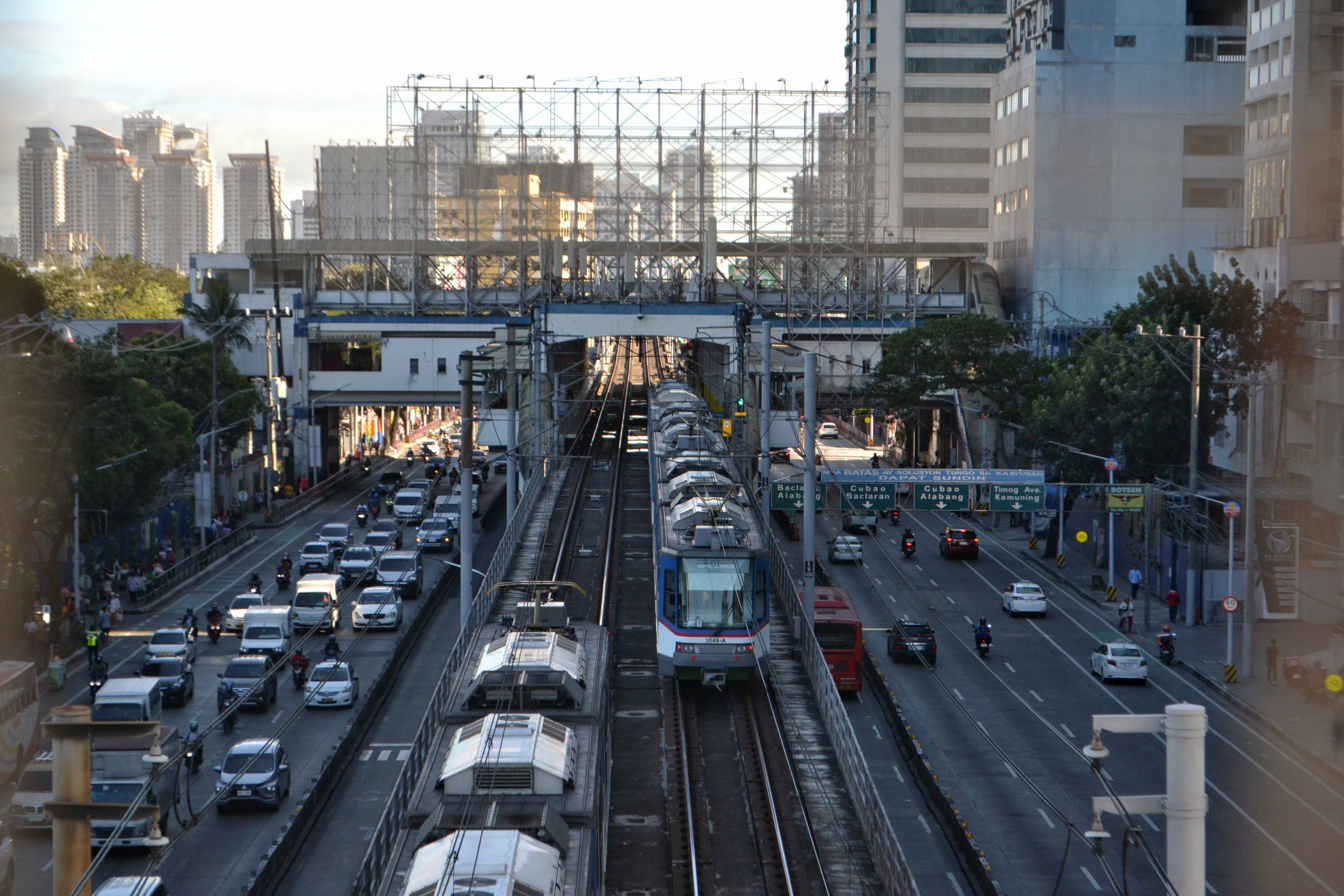
The MRT Line 3, and EDSA Carousel alongside Epifanio de los Santos Avenue in 2024.

Transportation in the Philippines covers the transportation methods within the archipelagic nation of over 7,600 islands. From a previously underdeveloped state of transportation, the government of the Philippines has been improving transportation through various direct infrastructure projects, and these include an increase in air, sea, road, and rail transportation and transport hubs. However, relative to the size of population and level of income, public transportation remains underdeveloped in the Philippines.

Jeepneys are a popular and iconic public utility vehicle; they have become a symbol of the Philippine culture. Another popular mode of public transportation in the country is the motorized tricycles, especially common in smaller urban and rural areas. The Philippines has four railway lines: Manila Light Rail Transit System Line 1 (LRT Line 1), LRT Line 2, MRT Line 3, and the PNR Metro Commuter Line operated by the Philippine National Railways. There are also steam engines found in the Visayas, mostly Negros island, which operate sugar mills such as Central Azucarera. Taxis and buses are also important modes of public transport in urban areas.

The Philippines has 12 international airports and more than 20 major and minor domestic airports serving the country. Ninoy Aquino International Airport is the country's chief airport.

== Labor, income and welfare ==
The labor policy in the Philippines is primarily defined by the Labor Code of the Philippines and other related labor laws. As of 2025, these laws apply to approximately 38 million Filipinos who are part of the labor force, including, to some extent, overseas workers. They are intended to establish the legal rights of workers and set limitations concerning the hiring process, working conditions, employee benefits, labor policymaking within companies, and employer-employee relations.

The Labor Code and other labor legislation are implemented mainly by government agencies, including the Department of Labor and Employment and the Department of Migrant Workers (formerly the Philippine Overseas Employment Administration). Non-governmental entities, such as trade unions and employer organizations, also contribute to the development and enforcement of labor standards in the country.

== Regional accounts ==
According to the Philippine Statistics Authority (PSA), gross regional domestic product (GRDP) is GDP measured at regional levels. Figures below are for the year 2025 at current prices.

	Region	GRDP in PH pesos
1	National Capital Region	8,749,999,580,000
2	Calabarzon	3,998,754,951,000
3	Central Luzon	3,040,694,422,000
4	Central Visayas	1,577,638,355,000
5	Davao Region	1,461,264,481,000
6	Northern Mindanao	1,342,414,958,000
7	Ilocos Region	925,021,342,000
8	Negros Island Region	853,026,868,000
9	Western Visayas	845,796,704,000
10	Bicol Region	789,384,125,000
11	Soccsksargen	700,694,357,000
12	Zamboanga Peninsula	672,297, 249,000
13	Eastern Visayas	645,603,173,000
14	Cagayan Valley	579,622,442,000
15	Mimaropa	538,064,872,000
16	Caraga	477,742,365,000
17	Cordillera Administrative Region	475,154,793,000
18	Bangsamoro	336,759,754,000

== Provincial accounts ==
According to the Philippine Statistics Authority (PSA), Provincial Product Account (PPA) is GDP measured at provincial levels. Figures below are for the year 2025 at current prices.

#	Province	PPA GDP (in PH Pesos)
1	Cebu (incl. Cebu City, Mandaue & Lapu-Lapu)	1,320,415,987,000
2	Laguna	1,264,542,976,000
3	Cavite	1,013,342,993,000
4	Pampanga (incl. Angeles City)	926,918,917,000
5	Davao del Sur (incl. Davao City)	908,556,268,000
6	Batangas	852,048,238,000
7	Bulacan	806,762,827,000
8	Misamis Oriental (incl. Cagayan de Oro)	612,131,375,000
9	Negros Occidental (incl. Bacolod)	585,271,749,000
10	Iloilo (incl. Iloilo City)	515,252,330,000
11	Pangasinan	491,905,703,000
12	Rizal	487,267,298,000
13	Nueva Ecija	416,862,554,000
14	Quezon (incl. Lucena)	391,553,447,000
15	South Cotabato (incl. General Santos)	371,985,238,000
16	Bataan	367,106,854,000
17	Leyte (incl. Tacloban)	363,070,392,000
18	Bukidnon	343,517,568,000
19	Zamboanga del Sur (incl. Zamboanga City)	335,063,034,000
20	Benguet (incl. Baguio)	334,315,090,000
21	Tarlac	284,165,909,000
22	Davao del Norte	266,405,703,000
23	Bohol	257,222,367,000
24	Camarines Sur	250,106,995,000
25	Negros Oriental	249,029,109,000
26	Isabela	246,121,300,000
27	Palawan (incl. Puerto Princesa)	245,103,052,000
28	Cagayan	205,289,804,000
29	Albay	200,953,654,000
30	Zambales (incl. Olongapo)	195,523,369,000
31	Lanao del Norte (incl. Iligan)	194,489,175,000
32	Misamis Occidental	175,005,575,000
33	Cotabato	168,823,070,000
34	Zamboanga del Norte	167,322,762,000
35	La Union	165,196,110,000
36	Oriental Mindoro	147,381,449,000
37	Davao de Oro	147,161,336,000
38	Agusan del Norte (incl. Butuan)	138,082,885,000
39	Ilocos Norte	136,520,166,000
40	Ilocos Sur	131,399,364,000
41	Surigao del Norte	122,894,567,000
42	Masbate	117,101,593,000
43	Maguindanao del Norte	113,453,098,000
44	Capiz	109,512,161,000
45	Agusan del Sur	105,138,329,000
46	Antique	100,994,833,000
47	Lanao del Sur	99,852,883,000
48	Sorsogon	98,851,511,000
49	Surigao del Sur	95,098,771,000
50	Aklan	94,929,880,000
51	Sultan Kudarat	93,226,490,000
52	Nueva Vizcaya	92,461,019,000
53	Zamboanga Sibugay	83,902,663,000
54	Davao Oriental	83,817,636,000
55	Camarines Norte	83,477,426,000
56	Samar	81,927,968,000
57	Sulu	70,755,260,000
58	Occidental Mindoro	70,543,691,000
59	Sarangani	66,659,558,000
60	Southern Leyte	62,401,094,000
61	Northern Samar	60,795,210,000
62	Davao Occidental	55,323,537,000
63	Maguindanao del Sur	55,073,133,000
64	Eastern Samar	53,549,849,000
65	Basilan (incl. Isabela)	47,800,619,000
66	Aurora	43,353,991,000
67	Romblon	42,538,414,000
68	Catanduanes	38,892,946,000
69	Kalinga	37,374,525,000
70	Ifugao	35,960,585,000
71	Tawi-Tawi	35,833,550,000
72	Marinduque	32,498,267,000
73	Abra	31,006,737,000
74	Quirino	28,505,750,000
75	Guimaras	25,107,500,000
76	Biliran	23,858,660,000
77	Mountain Province	21,650,370,000
78	Siquijor	18,726,010,000
79	Camiguin	17,271,266,000
80	Dinagat Islands	16,527,814,000
81	Apayao	14,847,486,000
82	Batanes	7,244,568,000

Source: Philippine Statistics Authority

== City accounts ==
Figures below are Provincial Product Accounts (PPA) for Highly Urbanized Cities (HUC) or Independent Cities. Figures are for the year 2025.

#	City	GDP in PH pesos
1	Quezon City	1,696,348,927,000
2	Makati	1,544,175,801,000
3	Manila	1,276,823,437,000
4	Taguig	836,443,292,000
5	Davao City	753,087,986,000
6	Pasig	651,672,005,000
7	Pasay	457,605,006,000
8	Parañaque	456,105,409,000
9	Cebu City	410,420,766,000
10	Mandaluyong	401,097,847,000
11	Cagayan de Oro	381,637,966,000
12	Muntinlupa	339,603,060,000
13	Caloocan	310,819,868,000
14	Iloilo City	228,556,733,000
15	Valenzuela	218,433,208,000
16	Bacolod	218,406,193,000
17	Baguio	217,460,476,000
18	Lapu-Lapu City	212,722,717,000
19	Zamboanga City	189,936,321,000
20	Angeles City	186,662,786,000
21	General Santos	179,265,459,000
22	Mandaue	149,850,509,000
23	Las Piñas	147,331,987,000
24	Marikina	144,464,934,000
25	San Juan	116,888,856,000
26	Iligan	111,224,646,000
27	Malabon	88,406,839,000
28	Puerto Princesa	88,101,872,000
29	Butuan	82,738,688,000
30	Tacloban	74,985,067,000
31	Olongapo	73,912,338,000
32	Lucena	67,808,135,000
33	Navotas	51,844,385,000
34	Isabela	15,253,530,000
35	Pateros	11,934,717,000

source: Philippine Statistics Authority

== International comparisons ==
Organization	Report	As of	Change from previous	Ranking
Fraser Institute	Economic Freedom of the World	2021	▼3	70 out of 144
International Monetary Fund	GDP (PPP)	2023	Steady	29th
International Monetary Fund	GDP (nominal)	2023	▲5	34th
International Monetary Fund	GDP per capita (PPP)	2023	▲3	116th
International Monetary Fund	GDP per capita (nominal)	2023	▲4	124th
International Monetary Fund	Foreign exchange reserves	2023	Steady	28th
The Heritage Foundation/The Wall Street Journal	Index of Economic Freedom	2016	▲13	76 out of 178
The World Factbook	External debt	2023	▼3	35th
United Nations	Human Development Index	2021	Steady	116 out of 191
World Economic Forum	Global Competitiveness	2019	▼8	64 out of 141
World Economic Forum	Global Enabling Trade Report	2014	▲8	64 out of 138
World Economic Forum	Financial Development Index	2012	▼5	49 out of 60
World Bank	Ease of doing business index	2014	▲13	95 out of 183

== Statistics ==
Exports of the Philippines by product category (2019) Chemical products Transportation Machines Mineral products Plastics and rubbers Metals Foodstuffs Precious metals Textiles Instruments Animal products Vegetable products Paper goods Footwear and headwear Miscellaneous Stone and glass Wood products Animal and vegetable bi-products Animal hides Arts and antiques Weapons

	2025	2024	2023	2022	2021	2020	2019	2018	2017
Social Indicators
Population (in million)	113.9	112.9	111.9	110.9	110.1	109.2	107.3	105.8	104.2
Poverty (%)	9.7	-	15.5	-	18.1	-	-	16.6	-
Labor Force (in million)	51.8	51.3	51.1	49.0	47.7	43.9	42.4	41.2	40.3
Unemployment (%)	4.2	3.8	4.4	5.4	7.8	10.3	5.1	5.3	5.7
Wage Rates (Nominal ₱: end-of-period)	695.00	645.00	610.00	570.00	537.00	537.00	537.00	537.00	512.00
Inflation Rate (Constant 2018 prices; %)	1.7	3.2	6.0	5.8	3.9	2.4	2.4	5.2	2.9
External Sectors
Trade Balance (US$ million)	-66,670	-68,744	-66,306	-69,701	-52,806	-33,775	-49,312	-50,972	-40,215
Export of Goods (US$ million)	63,411	55,012	55,257	57,710	54,228	48,212	53,477	51,977	51,814
Import of Goods (US$ million)	130,081	125,394	121,292	127,412	107,034	81,987	102,788	102,949	92,029
Current Account (US$ million; % of GDP)	-16,291 (-3.3)	-17,512 (-3.8)	-12,387 (-2.8)	-18,261 (-4.5)	-5,943 (-1.5)	11,578 (3.2)	-3,047 (0.8)	-8,877 (-2.6)	-2,143 (-0.7)
External Debt (US$ million; % of GDP)	147,651 (30.3)	137,628 (29.8)	125,394 (28.7)	111,268 (27.5)	106,428 (27.0)	98,488 (27.2)	83,618 (22.2)	78,960 (22.8)	73,098 (22.3)
Personal Remittances (US$ million)	39,619	38,341	37,210	36,136	34,884	33,194	33,467	32,213	31,288
Foreign Reserves (US$ million)	110,814	106,234	103,725	96,130	108,794	110,115	87,836	79,189	81,567
FDI Flows (Inward; US$ million)	9,003	9,448	6,452	5,939	10,255	6,822	8,671	9,949	10,236
FDI Stock (Inward; US$ million)	134,574	125,522	118,856	109,622	108,049	103,193	94,593	82,997	73,016
Public Finances
Budget Balance (₱ billion; % of GDP)	-1,577 (-5.6)	-1,506 (-5.7)	-1,512 (-6.2)	-1,614 (-7.3)	-1,670 (-8.6)	-1,371 (-7.6)	-660 (-3.4)	-558 (-3.1)	-351 (-2.1)
Revenues (₱ billion; % of GDP)	4,453 (15.9)	4,419 (16.7)	3,824 (15.7)	3,546 (16.1)	3,006 (15.5)	2,856 (15.9)	3,137 (16.1)	2,850 (15.6)	2,473 (14.9)
Expenditures (₱ billion; % of GDP)	6,030 (21.5)	5,925 (22.4)	5,336 (21.9)	5,160 (23.4)	4,676 (24.1)	4,227 (23.5)	3,798 (19.5)	3,408 (18.7)	2,824 (17.1)
BSP Rates (Nominal; O-RRP)	5.23	6.33	6.16	3.07	2.00	2.73	4.41	3.63	3.00
Public Debt (₱ billion; % of GDP)	17,708 (63.2)	16,051 (60.7)	14,616 (60.1)	13,419 (60.9)	11,729 (60.4)	9,795 (54.6)	7,731 (39.6)	7,293 (39.9)	6,652 (40.2)
Peso-Dollar Rate (Average Period)	57.505	57.291	55.630	54.478	49.225	49.624	51.796	52.661	50.404
Sources: Bangko Sentral ng Pilipinas and UNCTAD

GDP-related data can be found here:

- Industries: electronics assembly, aerospace, agribusiness, automotive, IT and business process outsourcing, shipbuilding, garments, footwear, pharmaceuticals, chemicals, wood products, financial services, food processing, petrochemical, metalcasting and mining, real estate, textile, tourism
- Electricity – production: 106,115 GWh (2021)
- Agriculture – products: abaca, bananas, sugarcane, coconuts, durian, rice, corn, cassavas, mangoes; pork, eggs, beef, pineapples, fish
- Exports – commodities/products: Semiconductors and electronic products, machinery, transport equipment, aerospace/parts, automotive/parts, garments, chemicals, copper, nickel, petroleum products, coconut oil, fruits
- Imports – commodities/products: electronic products, machinery, telecommunication and transport equipment, automotive, chemicals, petroleum, cereals, livestocks, cement and steel, fruits
- Manufacturing Growth: 5.9% (April 2024)
- PMI Manufacturing: 52.2 (April 2024)
- Yield Curve: 10-Year Bond 6.70% (June 2024)
- Net International Investment Position: –$51.317 billion (2023 est.)

== Government budget ==
The national government budget for 2025 has set the following budget allocations: (Note: The figures from previous national budget may not reflect the latest due to fiscal adjustments and developments.)

Budget allocation	(PHP, billions)	(USD, billions)	Difference from F.Y. 2024
Department of Education	977.6	16.78	▲0.89%
Department of Public Works and Highways	900.0	15.44	▼10.88%
Department of Health	297.6	5.11	▼0.36%
Department of the Interior and Local Government	278.4	4.78	▲5.33%
Department of National Defense	256.1	4.39	▲6.05%
Department of Social Welfare and Development	230.1	3.95	▼0.78%
Department of Agriculture	211.3	3.60	▼0.49%
Department of Transportation	180.9	3.10	▼59.15%
The Judiciary	63.6	1.09	▲5.35%
Department of Labor and Employment	40.6	0.70	▲5.91%

== History ==
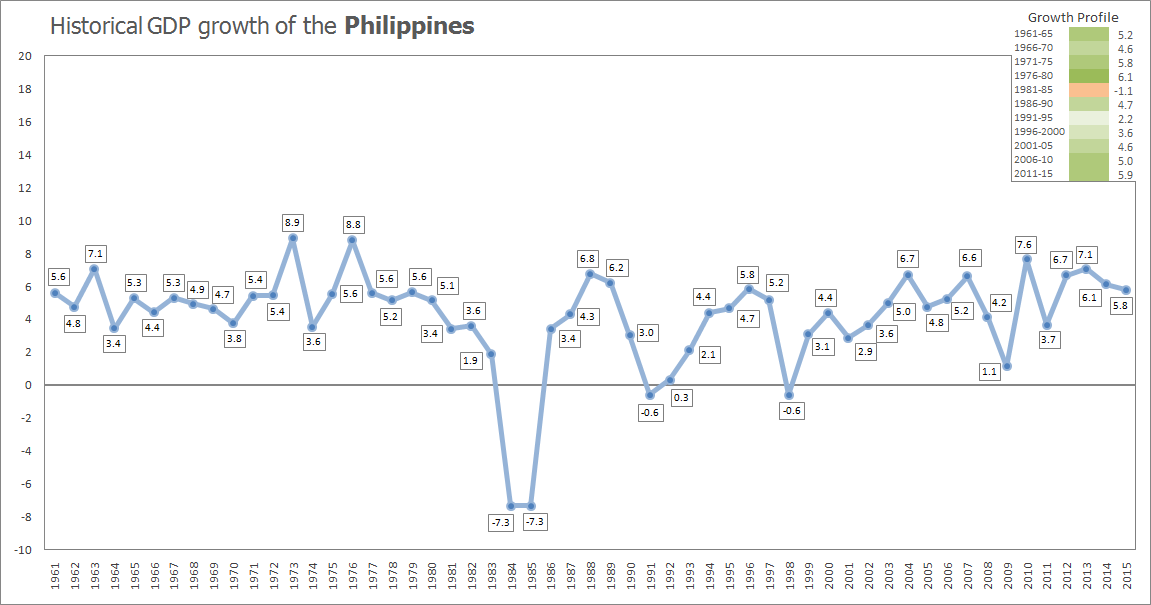
Historical growth of the Philippine economy from 1961 to 2015

The Philippine economy has been growing steadily over decades and the International Monetary Fund in 2014 reported it as the 39th largest economy in the world. The Philippines posted a high GDP growth rate of 7.6 percent in 2022. However, the country is not a part of the Group of 20 nations; instead, it is grouped in a second tier for emerging markets or newly industrialized countries.

Notes for economic growth (1980–2023):

1980-82: Slower economic growth due to mismanagement

1983-86: Recession due to factors like corruption

1987-90: Recovery from 1984 crisis

1991-1992: Inflation and natural disasters (notably Mount Pinatubo eruption) caused slower growth

1993-97: Fast growth

1998: Minor recession due to the 1997 Asian financial crisis

1999-2001: Recovery

2002: Recession due to the EDSA II Protest

2002-2008: Post-EDSA II recovery

2009: Effects of the Great Recession

2010-2019: Philippines as a Tiger Economy

2020: Coronavirus Outbreak

2021-2023: Rebound

A chart below outlines selected statistics showing trends in the gross domestic product of the Philippines using data taken from the International Monetary Fund.

- Indicates economic growth
- Indicates contraction / recession
- Indicates IMF forecast

Year	GDP (in Bil. US$PPP)	GDP per capita (in US$PPP)	GDP (in Bil. PHP nominal)	GDP (in US$nominal)	GDP per capita (in US$nominal)	GDP growth (real) (Note: GDP growth at constant 1985/2000/2018 prices in Philippine pesos:)	PHP:USD exchange rate (Note: Direct quotation: PHP to buy 1 USD. (Source: Bangko Sentral ng Pilipinas))
2025	1,479.4 ▲	12,934 ▲	28,502 ▲	497.5 ▲	4,349 ▲	4.40%	▲58.805
2024	1,391.8 ▲	12,191 ▲	26,546 ▲	471.5 ▲	4,130 ▲	5.70%	▲58.014
2023	1,278.6 ▲	11,326 ▲	24,276 ▲	436.6 ▲	3,720 ▲	5.60%	▼55.567
2022	1,173.1 ▲	10,512 ▲	22,023 ▲	404.3 ▲	3,623 ▲	7.76%	▲56.120
2021	994.6 ▲	9,043 ▲	19,390 ▲	393.7 ▲	3,579 ▲	5.60%	▲50.774
2020 (Note: As a result of shutdown of businesses imposed by the lockdowns to contain the COVID-19 pandemic.)	919.2 ▼	8,389 ▼	17,937.6 ▼	361.5 ▼	3,298 ▼	−9.50%	▼48.036
2019	1,005 ▲	9,295 ▲	19,514.4 ▲	376.8 ▲	3,485 ▲	6.00%	▼50.744
2018	930.0 ▲	8,720 ▲	18,262.4 ▲	346.8 ▲	3,251 ▲	6.30%	▲52.724
2017	854.0 ▲	8,120 ▲	15,556.4 ▲	328.5 ▲	3,123 ▲	6.70%	▲49.923
2016	798.6 ▲	7,703 ▲	15,133.5 ▲	318.6 ▲	3,073 ▲	6.90%	▲49.813
2015	741.0 ▲	6,547 ▼	13,307.3 ▲	292.4 ▲	2,863 ▲	5.80%	▲47.166
2014	642.8 ▲	6,924 ▲	12,645.3 ▲	284.8 ▲	2,844 ▲	6.10%	▲44.617
2013	454.3 ▲	4,660 ▲	11,546.1 ▲	272.2 ▲	2,792 ▲	7.20%	▲44.414
2012	419.6 ▲	4,380 ▲	10,564.9 ▲	250.2 ▲	2,611 ▲	6.80%	▼41.192
2011	386.1 ▲	4,098 ▲	9,706.3 ▲	224.1 ▲	2,379 ▲	3.60%	▲43.928
2010	365.3 ▲	3,945 ▲	9,003.5 ▲	199.6 ▲	2,155 ▲	7.63%	▼43.885
2009	335.4 ▲	3,685 ▲	8,026.1 ▲	168.5 ▼	1,851 ▼	1.15%	▼46.356
2008	329.0 ▲	3,636 ▲	7,720.9 ▲	173.6 ▲	1,919 ▲	4.15%	▲47.485
2007	309.9 ▲	3,493 ▲	6,892.7 ▲	149.4 ▲	1,684 ▲	7.12%	▼41.401
2006	283.5 ▲	3,255 ▲	6,271.2 ▲	122.2 ▲	1,405 ▲	5.24%	▼49.132
2005	261.0 ▲	3,061 ▲	5,677.8 ▲	103.1 ▲	1,209 ▲	4.78%	▼53.067
2004	242.7 ▲	2,905 ▲	5,120.4 ▲	91.4 ▲	1,093 ▲	6.70%	▲56.267
2003	222.7 ▲	2,720 ▲	4,548.1 ▲	83.9 ▲	1,025 ▲	4.97%	▲55.569
2002	207.8 ▲	2,591 ▲	4,198.3 ▲	81.4 ▲	1,014 ▲	3.65%	▲53.096
2001	197.3 ▲	2,511 ▲	3,888.8 ▲	76.3 ▼	971 ▼	2.89%	▲51.404
2000	187.5 ▲	2,437 ▲	3,580.7 ▲	81.0 ▼	1,053 ▼	4.41%	▲49.998
1999	175.8 ▲	2,352 ▲	3,244.2 ▲	83.0 ▲	1,110 ▲	3.08%	▲40.313
1998	168.1 ▲	2,297 ▼	2,952.8 ▲	73.8 ▼	1,009 ▼	−0.58%	▼39.059
1997	167.1 ▲	2,336 ▲	2,688.7 ▲	92.8 ▼	1,297 ▼	5.19%	▲39.975
1996	156.1 ▲	2,232 ▲	2,406.4 ▲	93.5 ▲	1,336 ▲	5.85%	▲26.288
1995	144.8 ▲	2,118 ▲	2,111.7 ▲	83.7 ▲	1,224 ▲	4.68%	▲26.214
1994	135.5 ▲	2,007 ▲	1,875.7 ▲	71.0 ▲	1,052 ▲	4.39%	▼24.418
1993	127.1 ▲	1,929 ▲	1,633.6 ▲	60.2 ▲	914 ▲	2.12%	▲27.699
1992	121.8 ▲	1,891 ▲	1,497.5 ▲	58.7 ▲	912 ▲	0.34%	▼25.096
1991	118.6 ▲	1,882 ▲	1,379.9 ▲	50.2 ▲	797 ▲	−0.49%	▼26.650
1990	115.2 ▲	1,873 ▲	1,190.5 ▲	48.9 ▲	796 ▲	3.04%	▲28.000
1989	107.6 ▲	1,791 ▲	1,025.3 ▲	47.3 ▲	786 ▲	6.21%	▲22.440
1988	97.6 ▲	1,663 ▲	885.5 ▲	42.0 ▲	715 ▲	6.75%	▲21.335
1987	88.4 ▲	1,540 ▲	756.5 ▲	36.8 ▲	641 ▲	4.31%	▲20.800
1986	82.4 ▲	1,471 ▲	674.6 ▲	33.1 ▼	591 ▼	3.42%	▲20.530
1985	77.9 ▼	1,426 ▼	633.6 ▲	34.1 ▼	623 ▼	−7.30%	▼19.032
1984	81.6 ▼	1,530 ▼	581.1 ▲	34.8 ▼	652 ▼	−7.31%	▲19.760
1983	84.9 ▲	1,630 ▲	408.9 ▲	36.8 ▼	707 ▼	1.88%	▲14.002
1982	80.1 ▲	1,578 ▲	351.4 ▲	41.1 ▲	810 ▲	3.62%	▲9.171
1981	72.9 ▲	1,471 ▲	312.0 ▲	39.5 ▲	797 ▲	3.42%	▲8.200
1980	64.4 ▲	1,334 ▲	270.1 ▲	35.9 ▲	744 ▲	5.15%	▲7.600
1979						5.60%	▲7.415
1978						5.20%	▲7.375
1977						5.60%	▼7.370
1976						8.00%	▼7.428
1975						6.40%	▲7.498
1974						5.00%	▲7.065
1973						9.20%	▼6.730
1972						4.80%	▲6.781
1971						4.90%	▲6.435
1970						4.60%	▲6.435

== See also ==
- List of largest companies in the Philippines
- List of regions of the Philippines by GDP
- List of special economic zones in the Philippines
- Bamboo network
- Tiger Cub Economies
- Corruption in the Philippines
- Maharlika Wealth Fund
