= List of countries by coconut production =

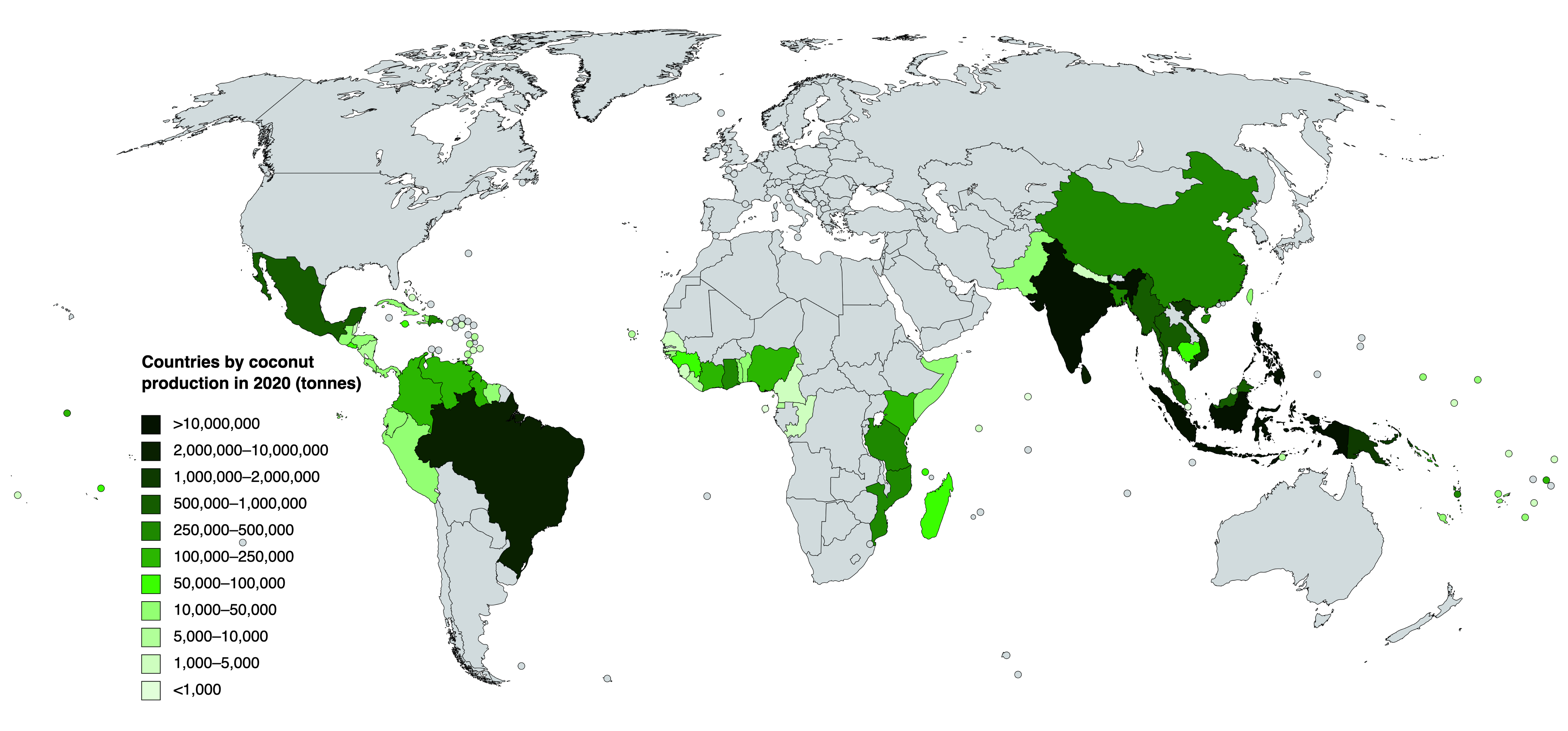
Countries by coconut production in 2020

This is a list of countries by coconut production from the years 2017 to 2022, based on data from the Food and Agriculture Organization Corporate Statistical Database. The estimated total world production of coconuts in 2022 was 62,409,431 metric tonnes, down 0.6% from 62,791,068 tonnes in 2021. Dependent territories are shown in italics.

Indonesia, the Philippines and India produce around 72% of the world's total copra, with Indonesia and the Philippines also being the world's main coconut oil exporters.

== Coconut production by country ==
Coconut production by country (metric tons)
| Country/region | 2022 | 2021 | 2020 | 2019 | 2018 | 2017 |
|---|---|---|---|---|---|---|
| Indonesia | 17,190,328 | 17,100,000 | 16,800,000 | 17,000,000 | 17,100,000 | 17,200,000 |
| Philippines | 14,931,158 | 14,717,294 | 14,490,923 | 14,765,057 | 14,726,165 | 14,049,131 |
| India | 13,317,000 | 14,301,000 | 14,006,000 | 14,682,000 | 16,413,000 | 11,166,772 |
| Brazil | 2,744,418 | 2,465,180 | 2,434,095 | 2,348,663 | 2,345,400 | 2,210,139 |
| Sri Lanka | 2,204,150 | 2,496,000 | 2,233,600 | 2,468,800 | 2,098,400 | 1,960,000 |
| Vietnam | 1,930,182 | 1,866,700 | 1,720,661 | 1,677,044 | 1,571,709 | 1,499,228 |
| Papua New Guinea | 1,258,149 | 1,180,000 | 1,180,000 | 1,780,312 | 1,780,312 | 1,780,312 |
| Myanmar | 1,217,442 | 1,220,000 | 1,252,215 | 1,276,095 | 1,414,010 | 1,225,690 |
| Mexico | 1,119,847 | 1,074,400 | 1,074,400 | 1,090,000 | 1,111,600 | 1,112,800 |
| Thailand | 679,232 | 651,866 | 618,246 | 866,416 | 858,235 | 761,914 |
| Malaysia | 604,428 | 568,894 | 560,984 | 536,606 | 495,531 | 517,589 |
| Ghana | 504,363 | 494,000 | 494,400 | 484,800 | 474,000 | 460,800 |
| Tanzania | 479,711 | 459,000 | 459,000 | 504,000 | 525,000 | 642,000 |
| Dominican Republic | 471,804 | 433,807 | 423,887 | 421,559 | 404,482 | 390,939 |
| Bangladesh | 411,969 | 402,852 | 431,596 | 431,596 | 466,975 | 408,635 |
| China | 400,585 | 391,346 | 402,639 | 395,440 | 403,000 | 327,000 |
| Vanuatu | 366,382 | 364,000 | 364,000 | 364,000 | 360,000 | 360,000 |
| Mozambique | 245,801 | 246,330 | 244,517 | 246,555 | 247,919 | 239,078 |
| Nigeria | 225,527 | 226,000 | 226,000 | 229,000 | 228,000 | 231,200 |
| Kiribati | 180,793 | 174,300 | 174,300 | 174,300 | 209,000 | 238,000 |
| Venezuela | 178,088 | 185,669 | 183,997 | 179,926 | 211,164 | 201,098 |
| Ivory Coast | 125,565 | 127,250 | 127,250 | 128,450 | 163,300 | 170,000 |
| Solomon Islands | 121,415 | 120,000 | 120,000 | 120,000 | 120,000 | 120,000 |
| Colombia | 118,052 | 155,081 | 153,800 | 145,578 | 140,249 | 142,235 |
| Jamaica | 111,196 | 101,640 | 90,636 | 103,200 | 103,566 | 101,040 |
| Micronesia | 96,374 | 93,637 | 93,637 | 93,637 | 93,637 | 72,029 |
| Cambodia | 85,184 | 84,392 | 84,000 | 83,000 | 83,000 | 84,000 |
| French Polynesia | 83,893 | 84,000 | 84,000 | 84,000 | 84,000 | 83,000 |
| Comoros | 83,659 | 86,724 | 83,512 | 80,300 | 77,088 | 73,876 |
| Kenya | 68,000 | 86,554 | 110,013 | 109,889 | 105,362 | 92,313 |
| El Salvador | 67,122 | 62,671 | 57,683 | 71,280 | 119,505 | 119,505 |
| Tonga | 64,198 | 63,600 | 63,600 | 63,600 | 63,600 | 67,200 |
| Samoa | 62,550 | 63,505 | 63,505 | 63,625 | 51,620 | 46,819 |
| Guinea | 54,939 | 53,000 | 53,000 | 53,000 | 53,043 | 52,512 |
| Madagascar | 52,624 | 54,391 | 56,512 | 58,400 | 58,400 | 59,200 |
| Peru | 42,806 | 38,937 | 36,419 | 34,565 | 32,923 | 32,645 |
| Guinea-Bissau | 40,377 | 40,549 | 40,744 | 41,048 | 40,599 | 40,390 |
| Haiti | 33,710 | 33,600 | 33,600 | 44,250 | 33,600 | 32,400 |
| East Timor | 31,404 | 30,800 | 30,800 | 30,800 | 29,900 | 30,000 |
| Cuba | 27,519 | 28,394 | 33,816 | 42,438 | 50,146 | 58,552 |
| Pakistan | 24,927 | 12,290 | 11,455 | 9,802 | 9,765 | 9,765 |
| Guyana | 23,915 | 17,770 | 14,849 | 14,020 | 13,877 | 15,786 |
| Marshall Islands | 22,902 | 21,609 | 21,609 | 21,609 | 19,200 | 30,400 |
| Fiji | 18,676 | 20,012 | 21,680 | 23,822 | 22,700 | 22,663 |
| New Caledonia | 18,223 | 18,000 | 18,000 | 18,000 | 18,000 | 18,000 |
| Costa Rica | 17,215 | 18,000 | 18,000 | 18,000 | 18,000 | 16,800 |
| Trinidad and Tobago | 16,856 | 16,800 | 16,800 | 18,000 | 18,000 | 18,000 |
| Taiwan | 16,169 | 17,169 | 17,891 | 18,955 | 19,561 | 20,348 |
| Panama | 16,071 | 15,967 | 15,847 | 15,728 | 15,610 | 15,733 |
| Guatemala | 14,740 | 14,400 | 14,400 | 18,000 | 18,000 | 19,200 |
| Somalia | 13,922 | 14,400 | 14,406 | 13,205 | 10,800 | 10,800 |
| Togo | 13,844 | 13,205 | 11,000 | 11,200 | 11,200 | 11,200 |
| Honduras | 13,409 | 13,415 | 13,501 | 13,312 | 13,433 | 13,756 |
| Benin | 13,398 | 13,665 | 14,017 | 14,087 | 14,400 | 14,400 |
| Ecuador | 12,264 | 12,728 | 13,131 | 13,174 | 14,000 | 15,000 |
| Saint Lucia | 10,519 | 12,000 | 12,000 | 12,000 | 9,600 | 10,400 |
| Equatorial Guinea | 9,585 | 9,603 | 9,603 | 9,603 | 8,737 | 8,151 |
| Liberia | 8,458 | 8,400 | 8,400 | 8,400 | 8,400 | 8,400 |
| Dominica | 8,198 | 8,400 | 8,400 | 8,400 | 8,400 | 9,600 |
| Suriname | 7,327 | 9,348 | 14,325 | 14,069 | 14,574 | 14,072 |
| Grenada | 7,210 | 7,200 | 7,200 | 7,200 | 7,200 | 7,200 |
| Nicaragua | 6,539 | 6,000 | 6,000 | 7,200 | 7,200 | 6,000 |
| Sierra Leone | 6,504 | 6,306 | 6,057 | 5,912 | 6,000 | 6,000 |
| Cape Verde | 6,043 | 6,000 | 6,000 | 6,000 | 6,000 | 6,000 |
| Tokelau | 4,861 | 4,800 | 4,800 | 4,800 | 4,800 | 4,800 |
| Seychelles | 4,756 | 4,800 | 4,800 | 4,800 | 4,800 | 4,800 |
| Senegal | 4,717 | 4,800 | 4,800 | 4,000 | 3,200 | 3,200 |
| Nepal | 4,664 | 4,573 | 4,578 | 4,675 | 4,540 | 307 |
| Cameroon | 3,605 | 3,694 | 3,806 | 3,927 | 4,000 | 4,000 |
| Saint Kitts and Nevis | 3,563 | 3,600 | 3,600 | 3,600 | 3,000 | 3,000 |
| Congo | 2,875 | 3,000 | 3,000 | 3,000 | 2,400 | 2,400 |
| Bahamas | 2,841 | 2,837 | 2,915 | 2,770 | 2,827 | 2,784 |
| Saint Vincent and the Grenadines | 2,666 | 2,800 | 2,848 | 2,700 | 2,618 | 2,455 |
| Niue | 2,601 | 2,600 | 2,600 | 2,600 | 2,600 | 2,600 |
| Sao Tome and Principe | 2,463 | 1,200 | 1,200 | 1,200 | 740 | 799 |
| Nauru | 2,410 | 2,400 | 2,400 | 2,400 | 2,400 | 2,400 |
| Tuvalu | 2,163 | 2,400 | 2,400 | 2,400 | 1,600 | 1,600 |
| Barbados | 2,089 | 2,068 | 1,990 | 2,389 | 2,400 | 1,600 |
| Cook Islands | 1,768 | 1,768 | 1,767 | 1,771 | 1,766 | 1,763 |
| Belize | 1,760 | 1,578 | 1,497 | 1,484 | 1,678 | 1,423 |
| Mauritius | 1,140 | 1,200 | 1,200 | 1,200 | 1,200 | 1,200 |
| Brunei Darussalam | 411 | 409 | 423 | 400 | 406 | 398 |
| Puerto Rico | 135 | 151 | 168 | 88 | 95 | 372 |
| Singapore | 118 | 117 | 117 | 120 | 113 | 117 |
| Maldives | 75 | 222 | 299 | 272 | 225 | 435 |
| Afghanistan | 10 | 150 | 160 | 170 | 190 | 200 |
