= Coconut production in the Philippines =

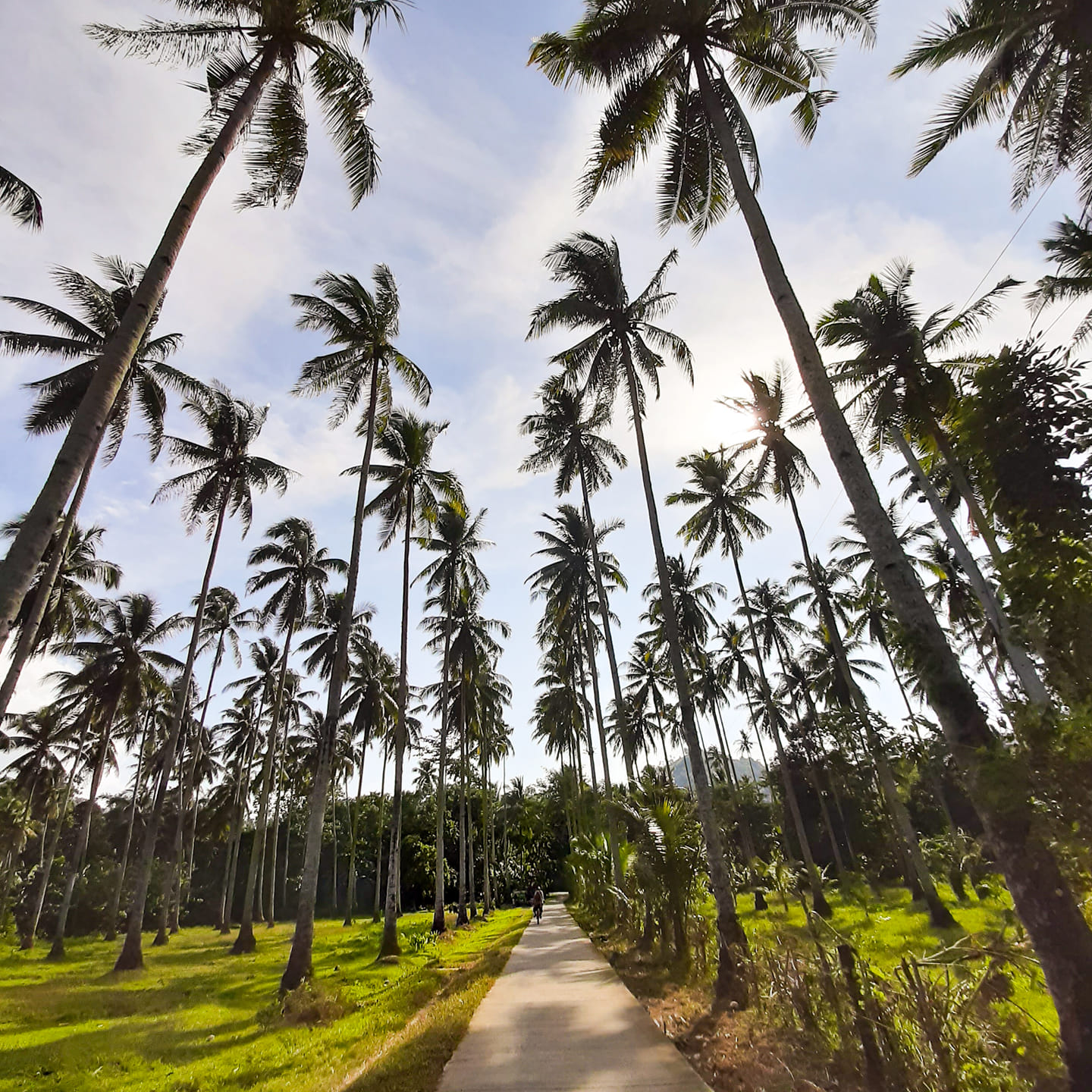
A coconut plantation in Dapitan

Coconut production plays an important role in the national economy of the Philippines. According to figures published in December 2009 by the Food and Agriculture Organization of the United Nations, the Philippines is the world's second largest producer of coconuts, producing 19,500,000 tonnes in 2009. Production in the Philippines is generally concentrated in medium-sized farms.

According to 2019 Philippine Statistics Authority data, coconut farmers earn an average daily wage of PHP338.72. According to farmers group Kilusan Para sa Tunay na Repormang Agraryo at Katarungang Panlipunan, coconut farmers are among the poorest in the agricultural sector.

The Philippines is the world's top producer and exporter of virgin coconut oil.

== History ==
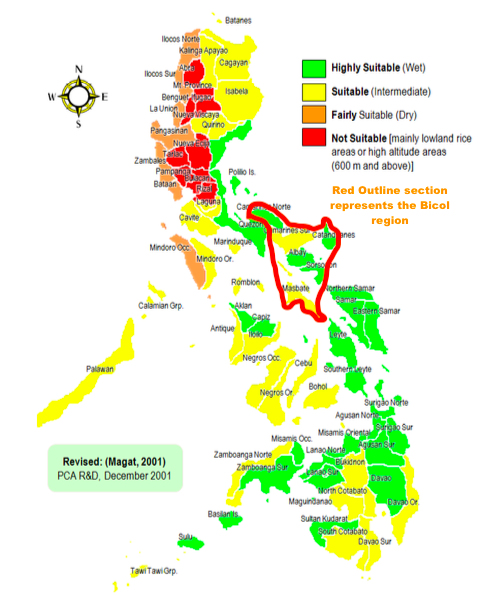
Coconut growing zones in the Philippines according to the Philippine Coconut Authority

According to the United Nations, coconut production in the Philippines grew at the rate of 5.3 per cent per year from 1911 to 1929, and increased by 3.5 per cent from 1966 to 1970.

In 2012, the Philippines exported more than 1.5-million tonnes of copra, coconut oil, copra meal, desiccated coconut, coco shell charcoal, activated carbon and coco chemicals, a 1.49 per cent increase compared to the volume exported in 2011.

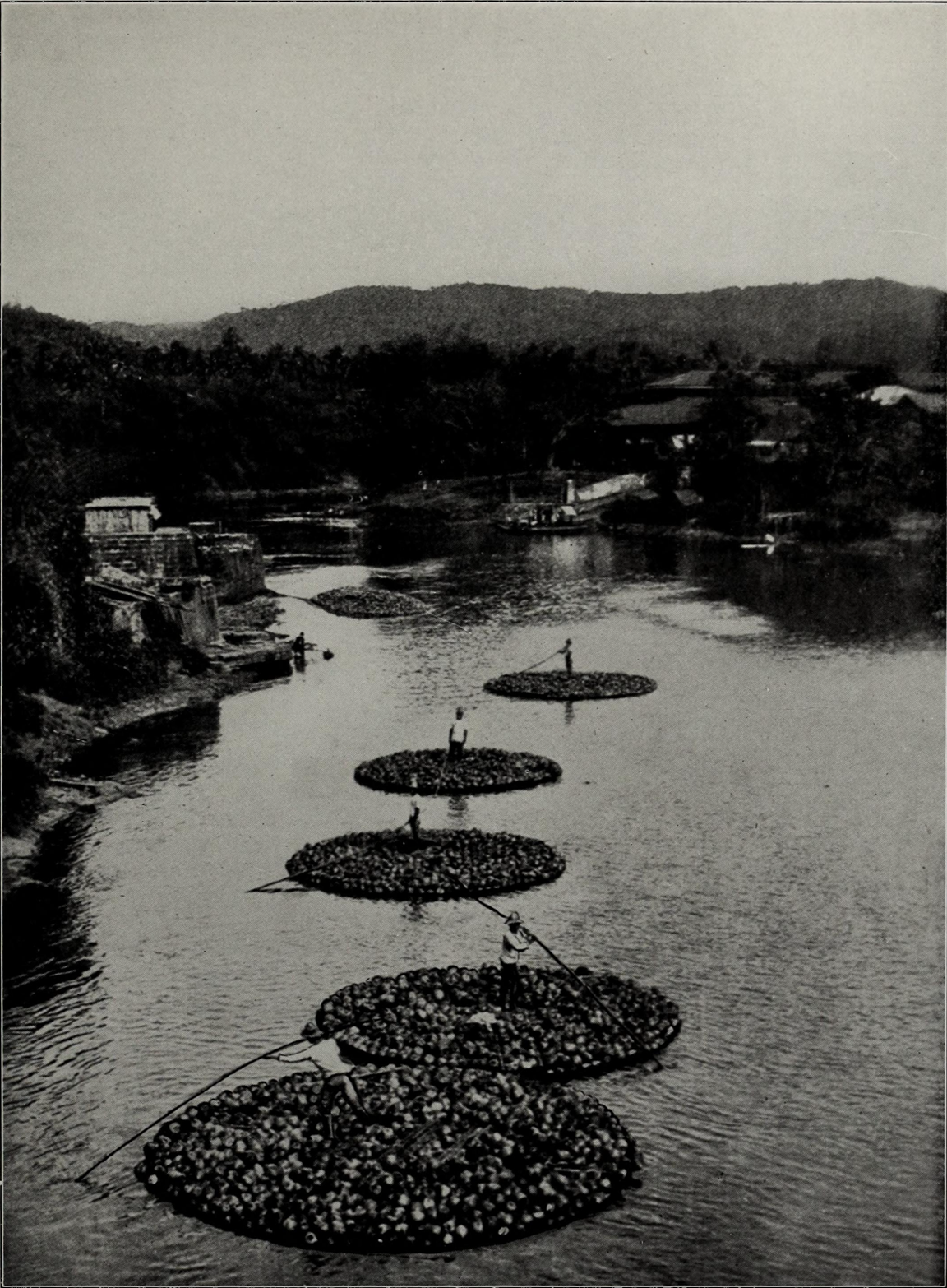
Coconuts being transported on rafts down rivers near Pasuquin, early 20th century

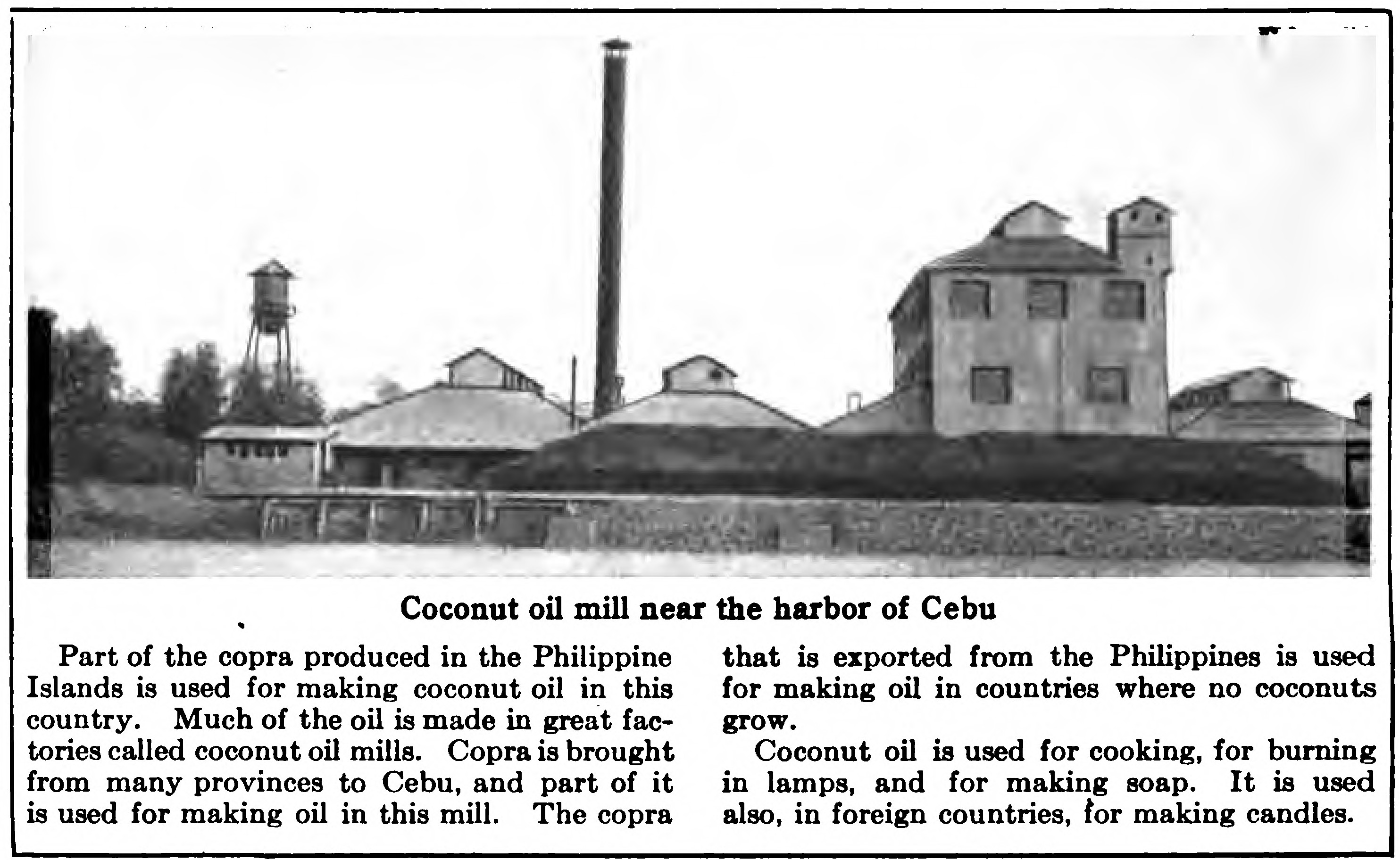
Coconut mill near the harbor of Cebu (c 1917)

In 1989, it produced 11.8 million tonnes and at the time was the second largest producer but has since surpassed Indonesia. In 1989, coconut products, coconut oil, copra (dried coconut), and desiccated coconut accounted for approximately 6.7 percent of Philippine exports.

As of the early 1990s, about 25 percent of cultivated land was planted with coconut trees, and it is estimated that between 25 percent and 33 percent of the population was at least partly dependent on coconuts for their livelihood. Historically, the Southern Tagalog and Bicol regions of Luzon and the Eastern Visayas were the centers of coconut production. In the 1980s, Western Mindanao and Southern Mindanao also became important coconut-growing regions.

In the early 1990s, the average coconut farm was a medium-sized unit of less than four hectares. Owners, often absentee, customarily employed local peasants to collect coconuts rather than engage in tenancy relationships. The villagers were paid on a piece-rate basis. Those employed in the coconut industry tended to be less educated and older than the average person in the rural labor force and earned lower-than-average incomes.

There are 3.6 million kilometers dedicated to coconut production in the Philippines, which accounts for 25 per cent of total agricultural land in the country. Land devoted to cultivation of coconuts increased by about 6 percent per year during the 1960s and 1970s, a response to devaluations of the Philippine peso (PHP) in 1962 and 1970 and increasing world demand. Responding to the world market, the Philippine government encouraged processing of copra domestically and provided investment incentives to increase the construction of coconut oil mills. The number of mills rose from 28 in 1968 to 62 in 1979, creating substantial excess capacity. The situation was aggravated by declining yields because of the aging of coconut trees in some regions.

In 1973, the martial law regime merged all coconut-related, government operations within a single agency, the Philippine Coconut Authority (PCA). The PCA was empowered to collect a levy of P0.55 per 100 kilograms on the sale of copra to be used to stabilize the domestic price of coconut-based consumer goods, particularly cooking oil. In 1974, the government created the Coconut Industry Development Fund (CIDF) to finance the development of a hybrid coconut tree. To finance the project, the levy was increased to P20.

Also in 1974, coconut planters, led by the Coconut Producers Federation (Cocofed), an organization of large planters, took control of the PCA governing board. In 1975 the PCA acquired a bank, renamed the United Coconut Planters Bank, to service the needs of coconut farmers, and the PCA director, Eduardo Cojuangco, a business associate of Marcos, became its president. Levies collected by the PCA were placed in the bank, initially interest-free.

In 1978 the United Coconut Planters Bank was given legal authority to purchase coconut mills, ostensibly as a measure to cope with excess capacity in the industry. At the same time, mills not owned by coconut farmers—that is, Cocofed members or entities it controlled through the PCA—were denied subsidy payments to compensate for the price controls on coconut-based consumer products. By early 1980, it was reported in the Philippine press that the United Coconut Oil Mills, a PCA-owned firm, and its president, Cojuangco, controlled 80 percent of the Philippine oil-milling capacity. Minister of Defense Juan Ponce Enrile also exercised strong influence over the industry as chairman of both the United Coconut Planters Bank and United Coconut Oil Mills and honorary chairman of Cocofed. An industry composed of some 0.5 million farmers and 14,000 traders was, by the early 1980s, highly monopolized.

In principle, the coconut farmers were to be the beneficiaries of the levy, which between March 1977 and September 1981 stabilized at P76 per 100 kilograms. Contingent benefits included life insurance, educational scholarships, and a cooking oil subsidy, but few actually benefited. The aim of the replanting program, controlled by Cojuangco, was to replace aging coconut trees with a hybrid of a Malaysian dwarf and West African tall varieties. The new palms were to produce five times the weight per year of existing trees. The target of replanting 60,000 trees a year was not met. In 1983, 25 to 30 percent of coconut trees were estimated to be at least 60 years old; by 1988, the proportion had increased to between 35 and 40 percent.

When coconut prices began to fall in the early 1980s, pressure mounted to alter the structure of the industry. In 1985, the Philippine government agreed to dismantle the United Coconut Oil Mills as part of an agreement with the IMF to bail out the Philippine economy. Later in 1988, United States law requiring foods using tropical oils to be labeled indicating the saturated fat content had a negative impact on an already ailing industry and gave rise to protests from coconut growers that similar requirements were not levied on oils produced in temperate climates.

By 1995, the production of coconut in the Philippines had experienced a 6.5% annual growth and later surpassed Indonesia in total output in the world.

In 2013, during Typhoon Haiyan (known as Super Typhoon Yolanda in the Philippines), around 44 million coconut trees were damaged, which affected 1 million coconut farmers in the Philippines. From 2011 to 2018, production of coconut and other agricultural crops declined in Eastern Visayas, one of the top coconut producing regions. Coconut production in Eastern Visayas dropped by 33% in 2017.

== Gallery ==
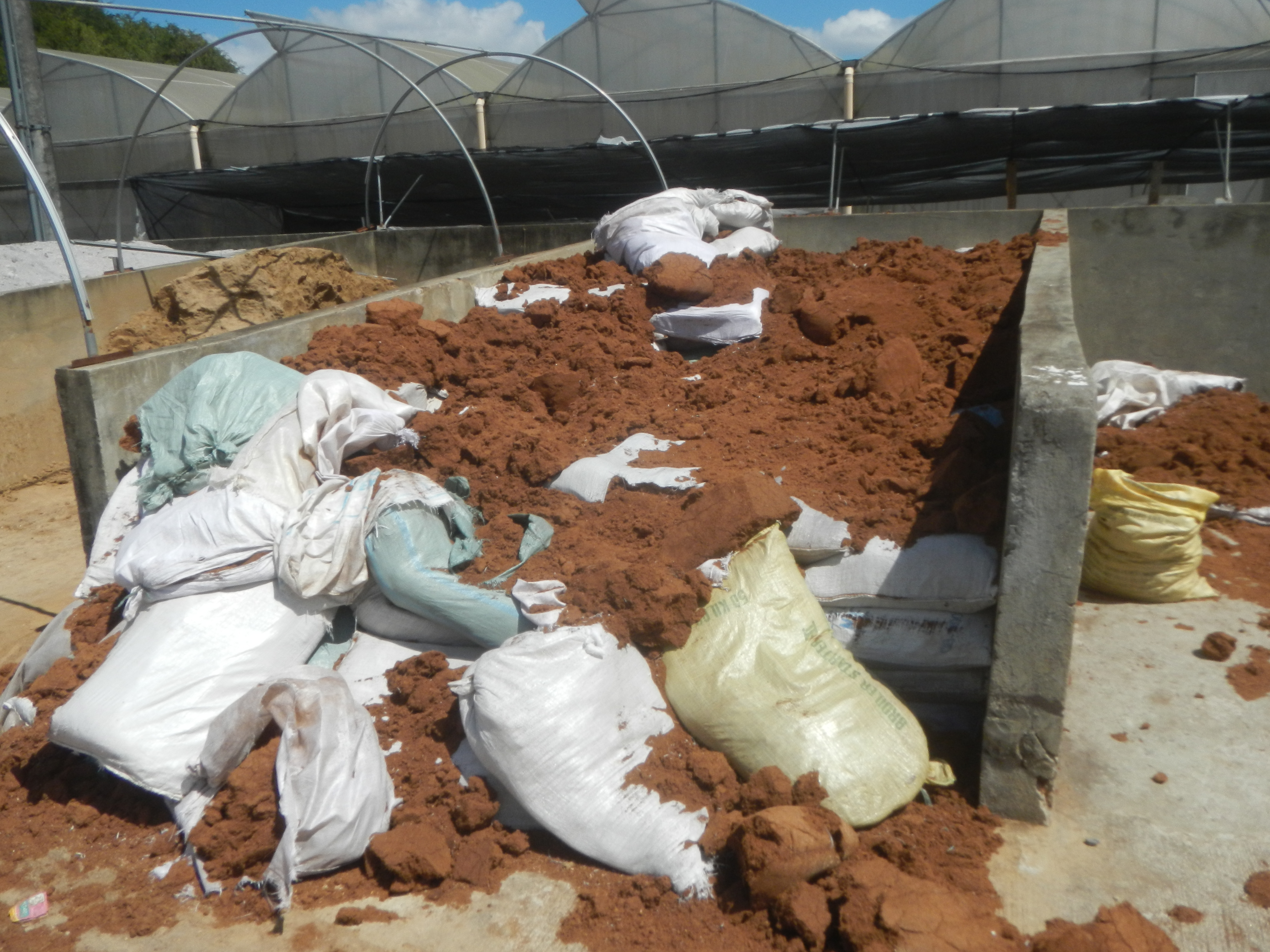

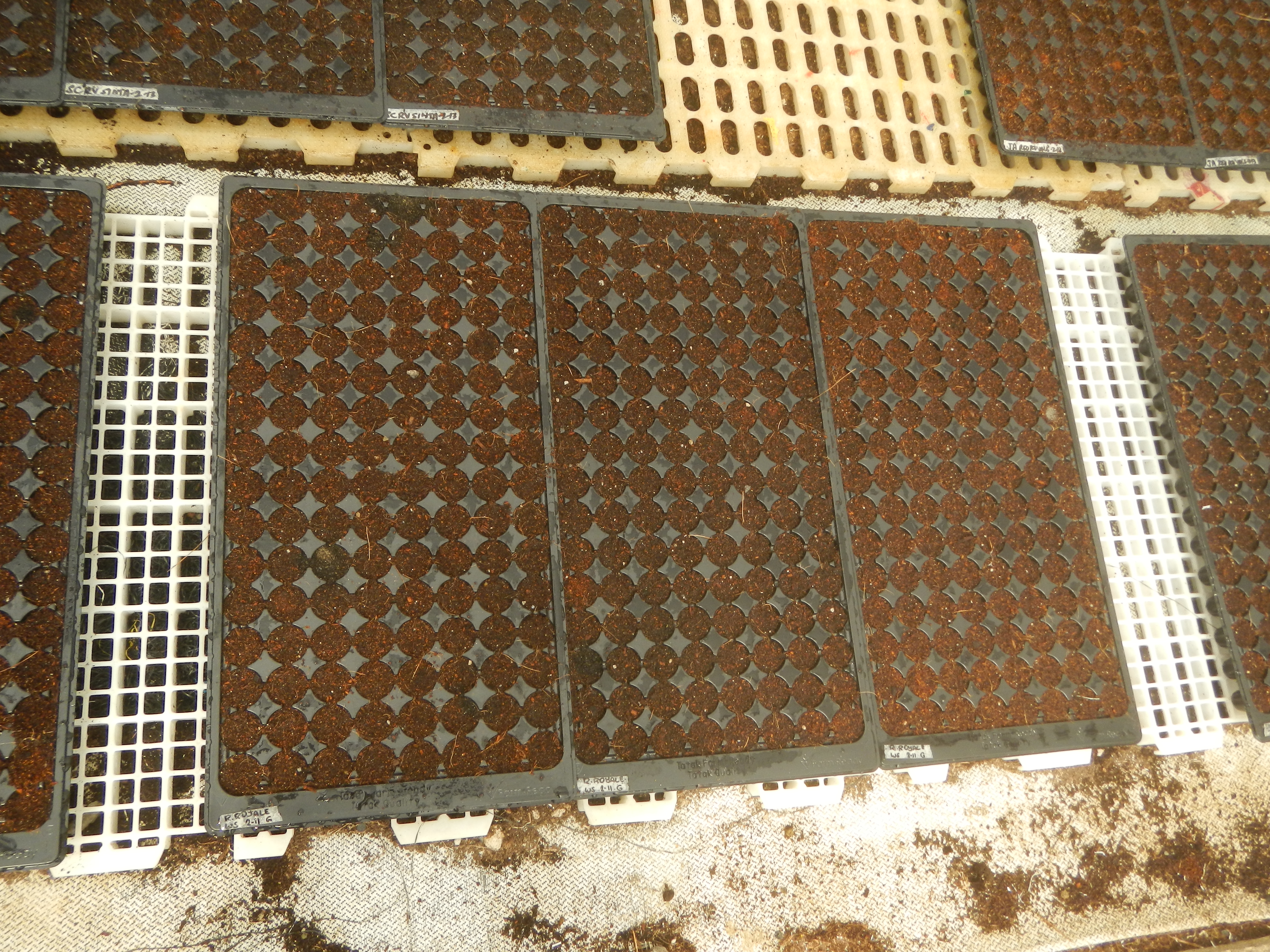

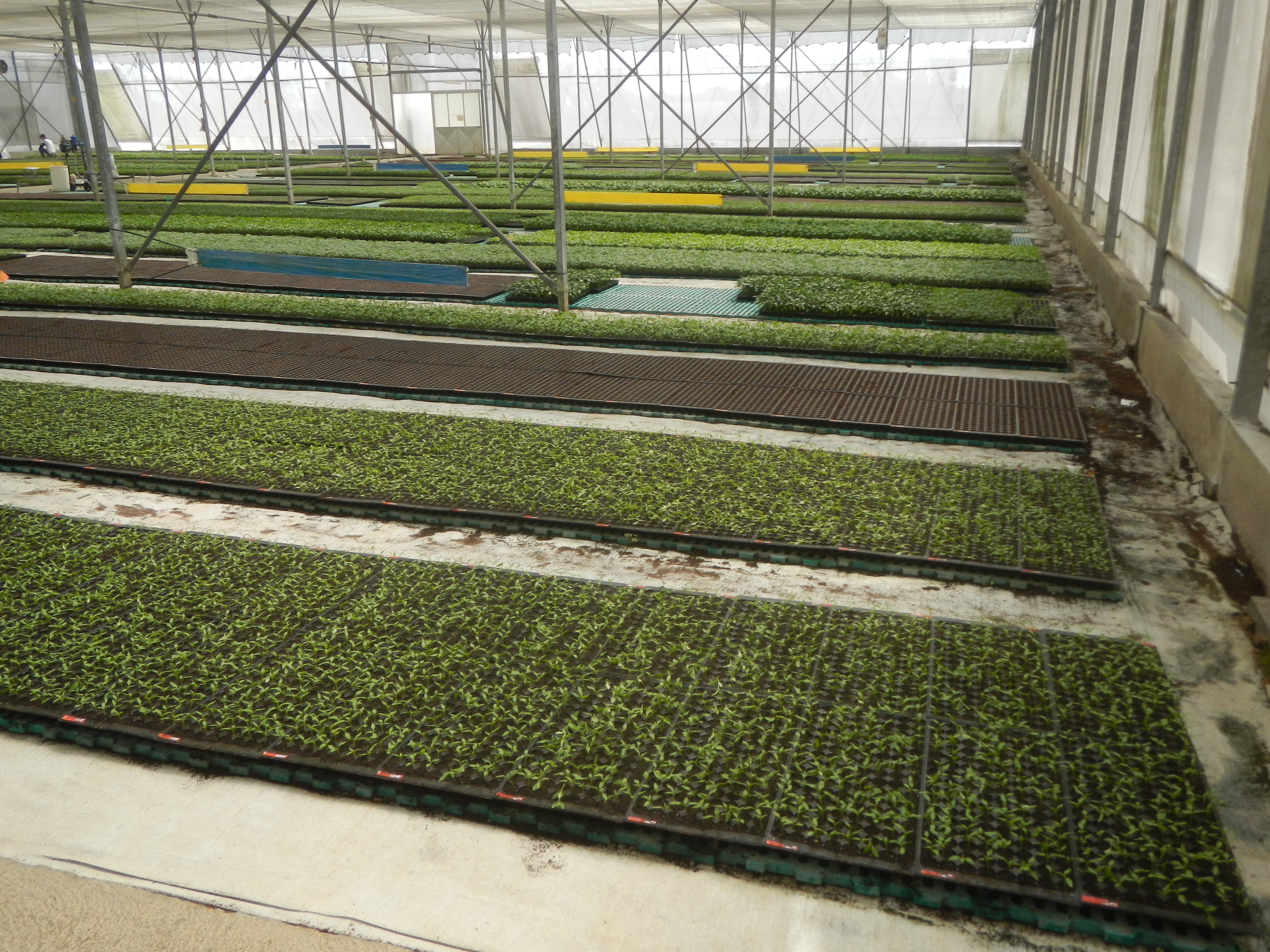

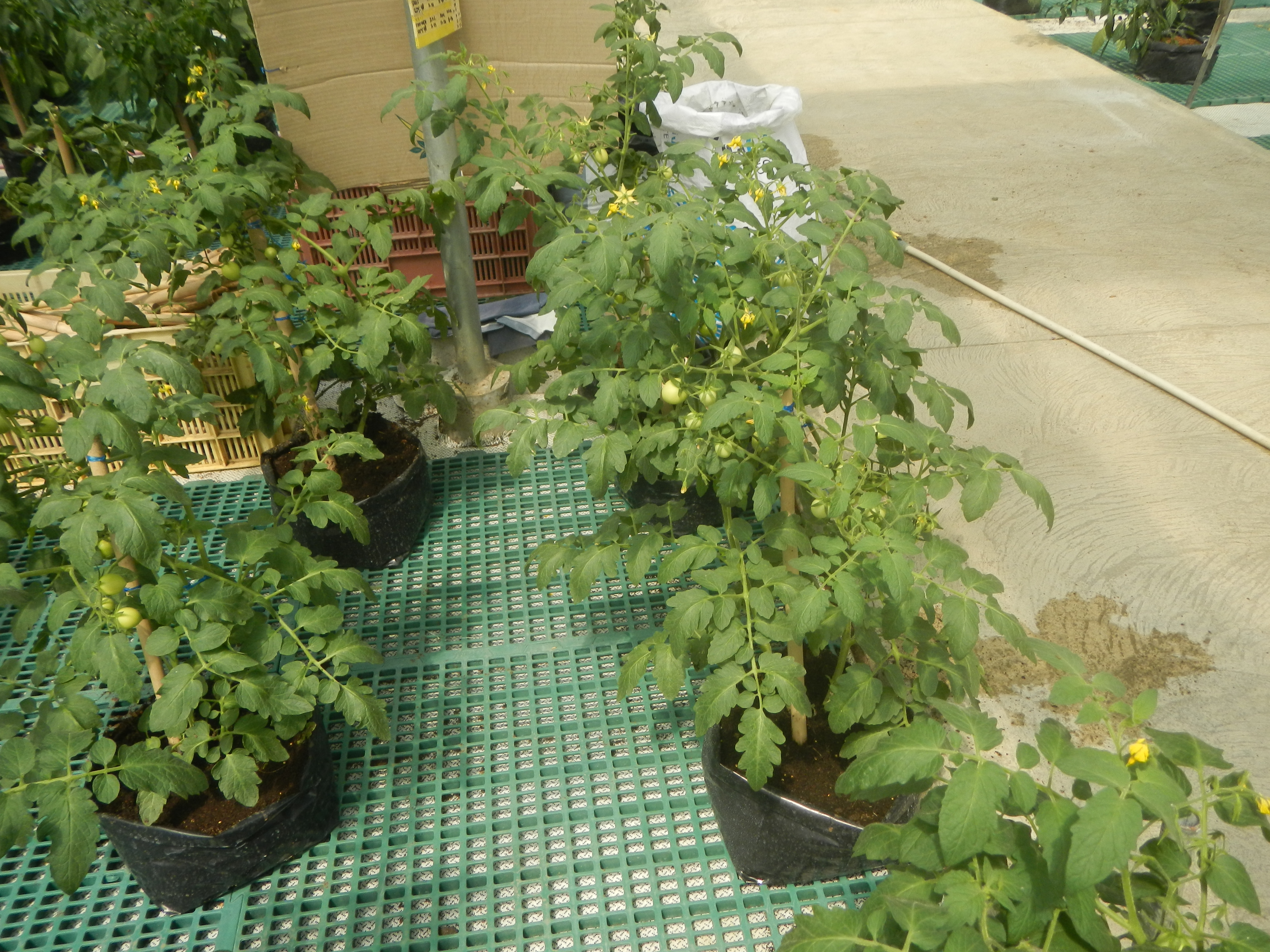

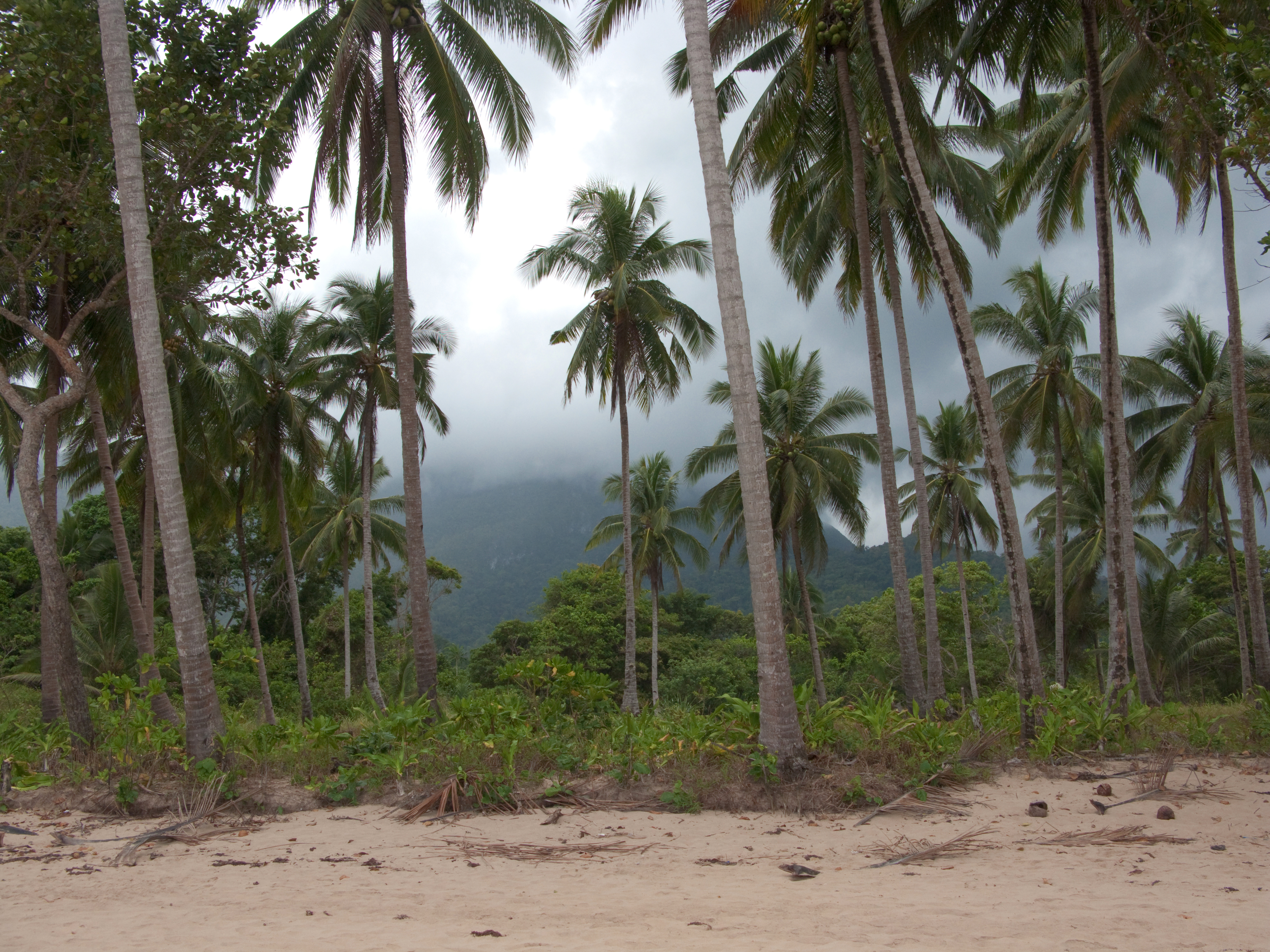

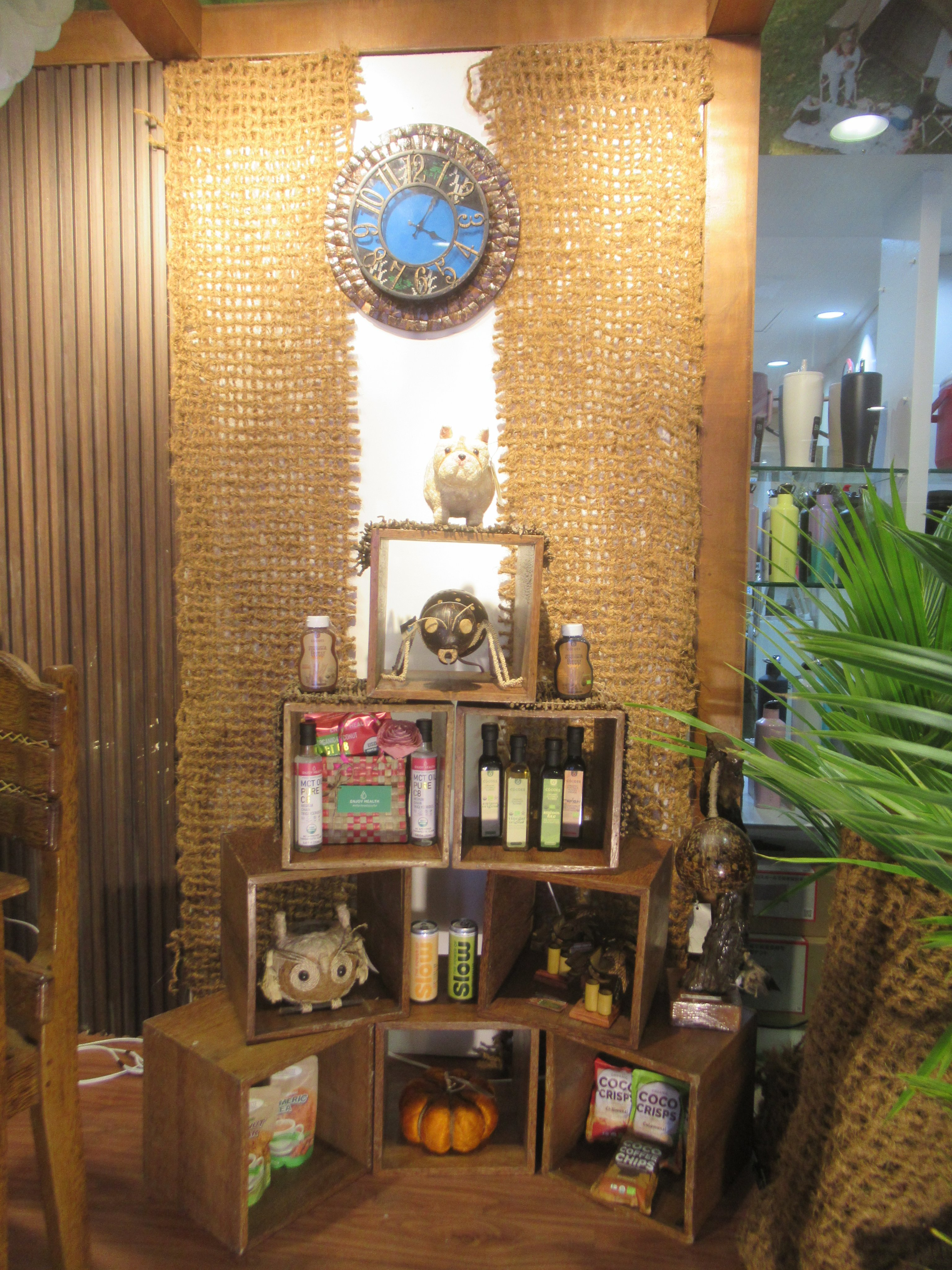
Coconut crafts

== See also ==
- Agriculture in the Philippines
- Coco Levy Fund scam
