= Coconut production in Indonesia =

Coconut production plays an important role in the national economy of Indonesia. According to figures published in December 2009 by the Food and Agriculture Organization of the United Nations, it is the world's second largest producer of coconuts, producing 15,319,500 tonnes in 2009.

Coconut plays an important role in Indonesian cuisine as well as its economy. Coconut milk is an important common ingredients in numbers of Indonesian favourites, including rendang and soto. According to figures published in December 2009 by the Food and Agriculture Organization of the United Nations, it is the world's second largest producer of coconuts, producing 15,319,500 tonnes in 2009.
