= Rice production in the Philippines =

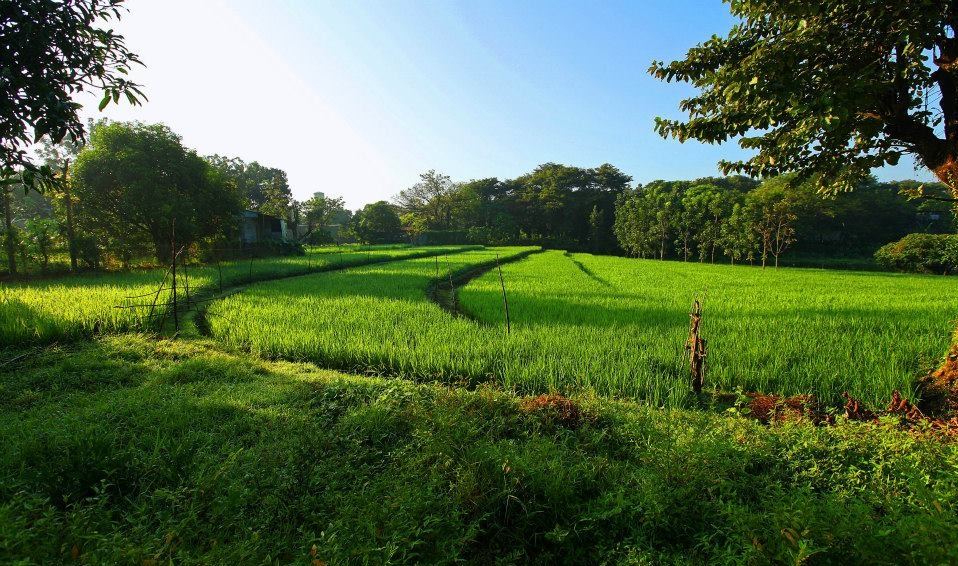
Rice paddies in Santa Maria, Bulacan

In the Philippines, rice production is an important aspect of the country's food supply and economy. It is also the staple food that provides about 35% of average Filipinos calorie intake and is a major source of income for millions of Filipino farmers.The Philippines is the 8th-largest rice producer in the world, accounting for 2.8% of global rice production. The Philippines was also the world's largest rice importer in 2010, 2023, and 2024. There are an estimated 2.4 million rice farmers in the Philippines as of 2020.

== Production ==
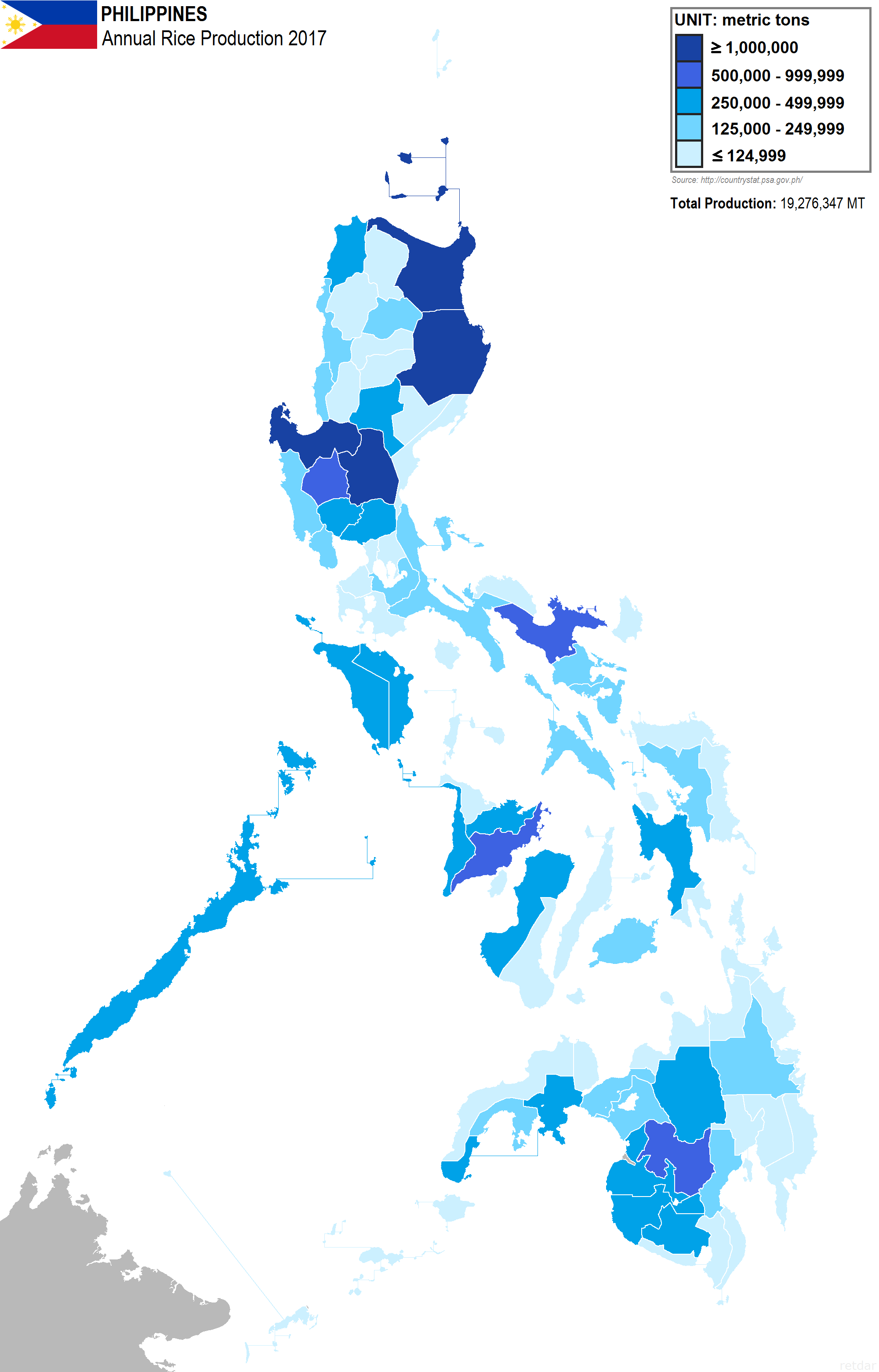
2015 annual rice production of Philippine provinces

Rice is the most important food crop, and is a staple food in most of the country. It is especially produced in Luzon, the Western Visayas, Southern Mindanao, and Central Mindanao.

In 2010, nearly 20.7 million metric tons of palay (pre-husked rice) were produced. In 2010, palay accounted for 21.86% percent of gross value added in agriculture and 2.37% of GNP. In 2017, the total paddy rice output met 93% of the country's annual requirement. The population consumed 11.7 million tonnes of rice. Historically, the per-hectare rice yields in the Philippines have generally been low in comparison with other Asian countries.

In 2024, the Philippines produced 19.1 million metric tons (MMT) of palay, the lowest in the last four years, due in part to climate-related disasters. Production of bigas (milled rice) also declined to 12.4 MMT and is below the projected rice consumption of 15 MMT for 2025.

== Farmers ==
There are an estimated 2.4 million rice farmers in the Philippines as of 2020. The average age of rice farmers is 56 years; 82% of rice farmers are men and 18% are women. Many Filipino farmers live in poverty due to a combination of factors, including economic policy, environmental, land ownership issues, and government corruption.

== History ==
Detail of an illustration from Jean Mallat's Les Philippines (1846), showing "a Tagalog couple pounding rice." The mortar depicted is known as a "lusong", which was also the Old Tagalog name of the Pasig River delta.

=== Precolonial ===
The first evidence of rice found in the Philippines dates to between 2025 BC and 1432 BC.

=== The Green Revolution ===
The Green Revolution, which was a period of greatly increased crop yields worldwide as a result of technology transfer initiatives, kicked off in the Philippines in 1960 during the administration of President Carlos P. Garcia, with the establishment of the International Rice Research Institute (IRRI). IRRI's research process led to its best-known contribution to the green revolution half a decade and two presidential administrations later in 1966 - the introduction of the "miracle rice," the high-yielding semi-dwarf IR8 rice variety.

The proportion of "miracle" rice in total output rose from zero in 1965–66 to 81 percent in 1981–82. Average productivity increased from 1.23 metric tons per hectare in 1961 to 3.59 metric tons per hectare in 2009.

This green revolution was accompanied by an expanded use of chemical inputs. Among farmers surveyed in Central Luzon, the quantity of insecticide active ingredient applied per hectare increased tenfold from 1966 to 1979, from less than 0.1 kilogram per hectare to nearly 1.0 kilogram per hectare. By the mid-1990s, this figure had been cut in half. Since then, use has declined even more, and levels of insecticide use are now slightly below what they were before the Green Revolution began.

=== Masagana 99 ===
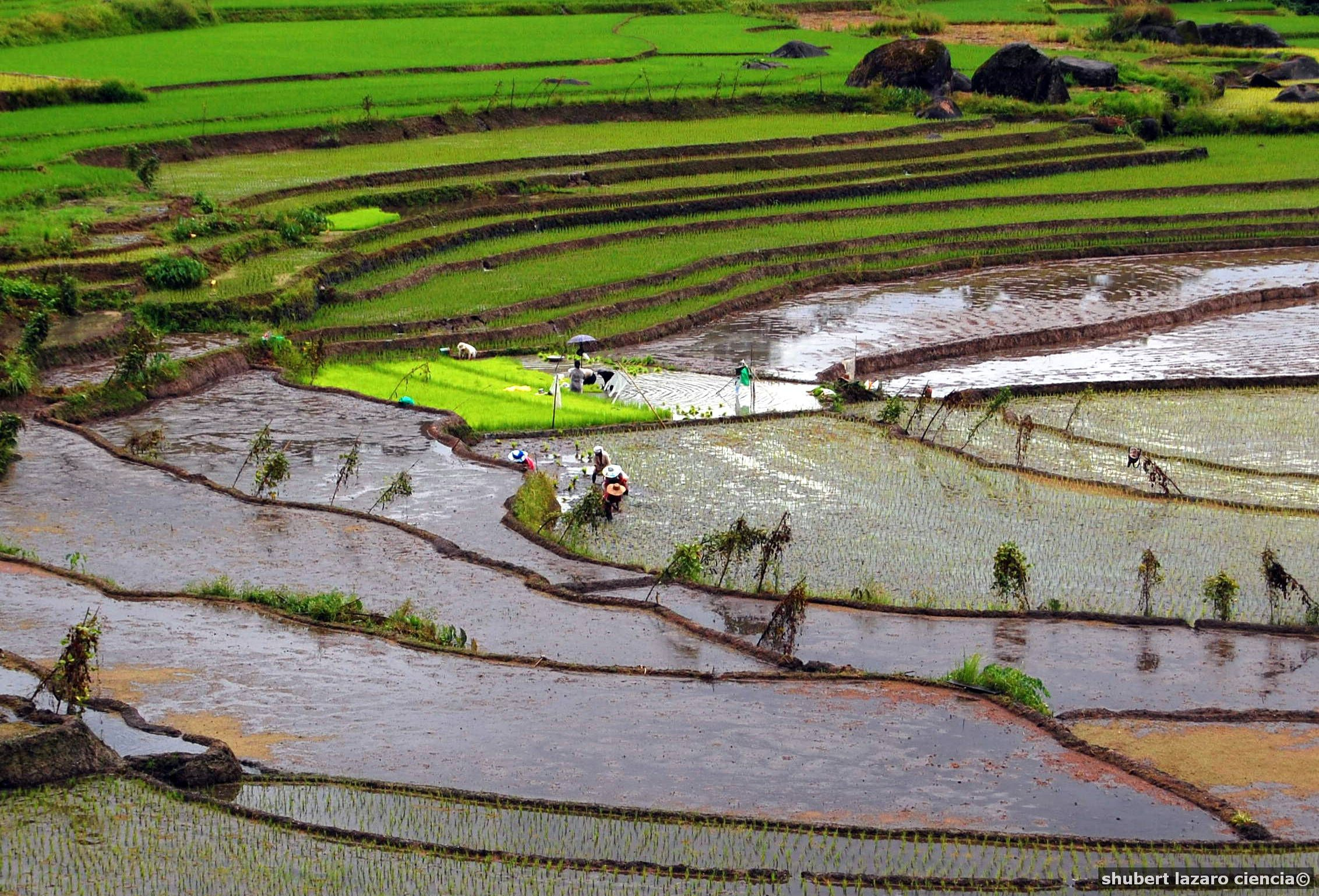
The Nagacadan Rice Terraces in Ifugao

The administration of Ferdinand Marcos made the promotion of IR8 the lynchpin of its Masagana 99 program in 1973, accompanied by a farmer credit program. But by 1980, the program's initial successes were overrun by problems arising from the credit scheme and the usurpation of the program for political patronage. The government quietly discontinued the program in 1984.

=== Growth of irrigation ===
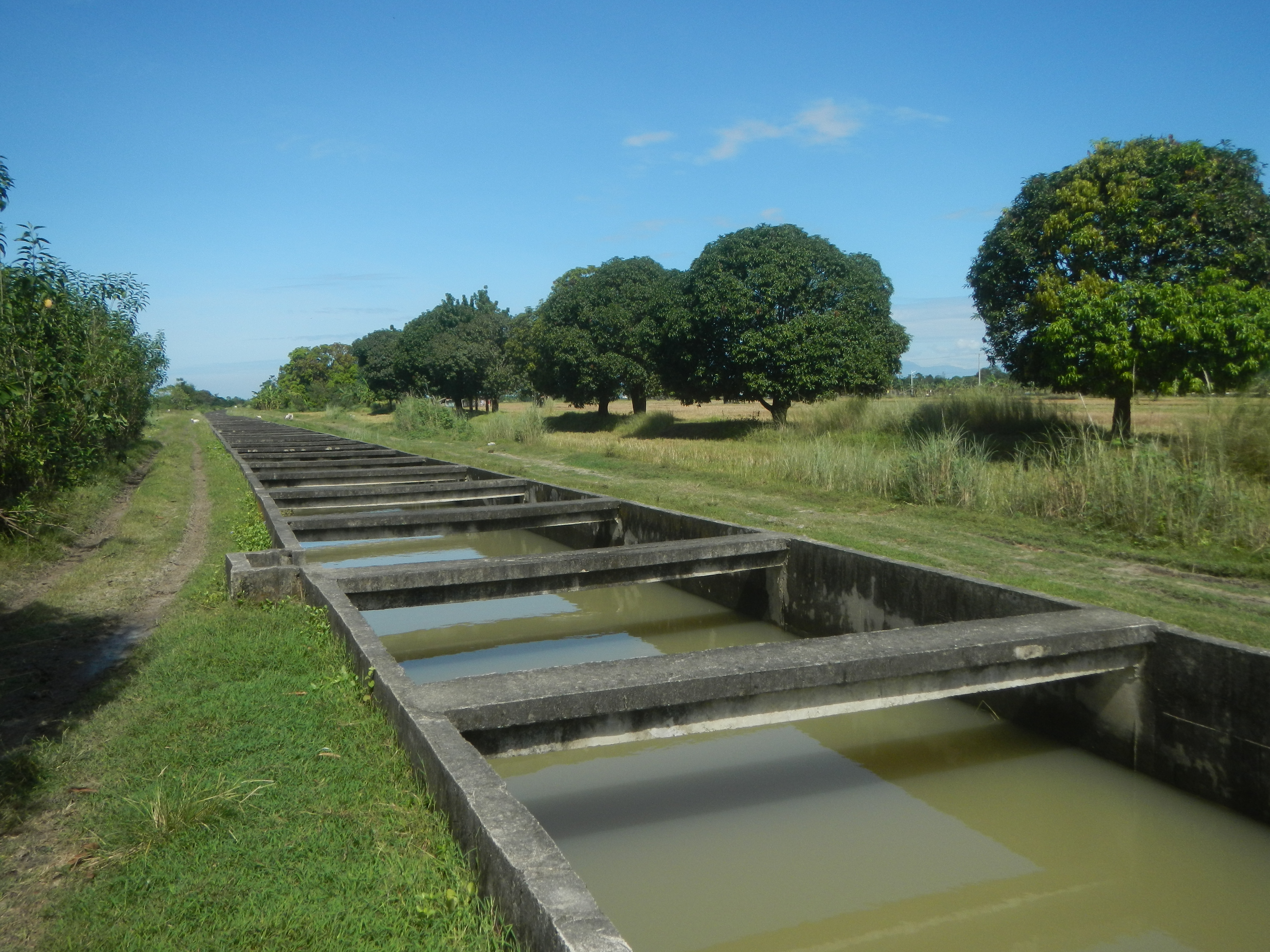
Irrigation in Rosales, Pangasinan

The government also undertook a major expansion of the nation's irrigation system. The area under irrigation grew from under 500,000 hectares in the mid-1960s to 1.5 million hectares in 2009, almost half of the potentially irrigable land.

In the 1980s rice production encountered problems. Average annual growth for 1980-85 declined to a mere 0.9 percent, as contrasted with 4.6 percent for the preceding fifteen years. Growth of value added in the rice industry also fell in the 1980s. Tropical storms and droughts, the general economic downturn of the 1980s, and the 1983-85 economic crisis all contributed to this decline.

Crop loans dried up, prices of agricultural inputs increased, and palay prices declined. Fertilizer and plant nutrient consumption dropped 15 percent. Farmers were squeezed by rising debts and declining income. Hectarage devoted to rice production, level during the latter half of the 1970s, fell an average of 2.4 percent per annum during the first half of the 1980s, with the decline primarily in marginal, nonirrigated farms. As a result, in 1985, the last full year of the Marcos regime, the country imported 538,000 tons of rice.

The situation improved somewhat in the late 1980s, and smaller amounts of rice were imported. In 1990 the country experienced a severe drought. Output fell by 1.5 percent, forcing the importation of an estimated 400,000 tons of rice.

As of 2018, the Philippines had a WTO-approved annual quota limiting private rice imports to protect local farmers, buying up to 805,200 tonnes of rice with a 35 percent import tariff.

=== Genetic engineering ===
The government has promoted genetically modified rice, including golden rice, for production in the country. The Supreme Court of the Philippines issued a Writ of Kalikasan in 2023 ordering the Department of Agriculture to stop the commercial distribution of genetically modified rice and eggplants in the country.

== Rice Tariffication Law ==
Republic Act No. 11203 signed by President Rodrigo Duterte on February 2, 2018

The Rice Tariffication Law (RTL) in the Philippines, Republic Act No. 11203, implemented in 2019, transitioned rice importation from quantitative restrictions to tariffs of 35-40%. It established the Rice Competitiveness Enhancement Fund (RCEF), funded by these tariffs. By 2021, rice production (palay) in the Philippines reached 20.0 million metric tons (MMT), a 3.5% increase from 2020, despite rice imports rising to 2.9 MMT. The RTL has significantly influenced the management of inflation in the rice sector since its implementation and serves as an approach for potential reforms in the agricultural sector of the Philippines.

Before tariffication, annual rice imports stood at 2 million tons or below. Rice imports rose to 3.17 million tons in 2019 after the passage of the Rice Tariffication Law, making the Philippines the world's top rice importer ahead of China. The increase in imports caused palay prices to decline sharply, and was followed by a drop in the income of farmers per hectare per season.

Objections to the Rice Tariffication Law were raised by farmer groups, which called for amendments to the law and the reinstatement of quantitative restrictions. According to the Federation of Free Farmers, farmers lost PHP40 billion in the first year of the law's implementation.

On May 20, 2024, the House of Representatives of the Philippines approved on third reading House Bill 10381, the "Rice Tariffication Law" amendments. AGRI party-list Representative Wilbert T. Lee stated that the "NFA's role would be an "equalizer" by purchasing palay from local farmers at a higher price and selling it at a lower price to consumers."

Rice tariffs were reduced by President Bongbong Marcos in 2024, from 35%-50% down to 15%. The country, which is one of the world's highest rice importers, was set to import 5.2 MMT of rice in 2025, the highest in its history, up from 4.7 MMT in 2024.

Peasant group Kilusang Magbubukid ng Pilipinas called for the repeal of the Rice Tariffication Law, describing the negative impacts on farmers of low farm gate prices of rice and the high cost of production.

Makabayan lawmakers stated that the Rice Tariffication Law has been detrimental to the rice farming industry and the entire agricultural sector. ACT Teachers party-list Representative Antonio Tinio and Gabriela party-list Representative Sarah Elago proposed to repeal the Rice Tariffication Law, give Department of Agriculture authority to restrict rice imports, and return to the NFA the authority to support rice farmers during regular times.

== Climate change ==
Philippine rice cultivation is both vulnerable to the effects of global climate change and a contributor to greenhouse gas emissions. This vulnerability to climate change threatens the country's food security. A report published by the United Nations Development Programme and supported by the Philippine Department of Environment and Natural Resources recommends the adoption of policies and programs to address the effects and causes of climate change.

In 2008–2011, the International Labour Organization and Philippine government agencies set up a pilot project to strengthen socio-economic resilience to climate change for Agusan del Norte rice farmers, through financial protection schemes and the diversification of livelihoods.

== See also ==
- Agriculture in the Philippines
