= Masagana 99 =

Philippine agricultural program

Masagana 99 was an agricultural program of then Philippine President Ferdinand Marcos to increase rice production among Filipino farmers. The program was launched in 1973 at a time the country was experiencing a rice supply shortage. By promoting high yield varieties, chemical fertilizers, and herbicides, the program initially allowed the Philippines to attain self-sufficiency in 1975–1976, and export rice to its neighboring Asian countries in 1977–1978. By 1980, however, problems with the credit scheme rendered the loans accessible only to rich landowners while leaving poor farmers in debt. The program was also noted to have become a vehicle of political patronage.

By 1984, the Marcos administration shifted its focus away from Masagana 99 and towards different programs.

== Etymology ==
"Masagana" is a Filipino term for "bountiful" while 99 refers to the number of sacks of rice targeted as the yield per hectare of land in every harvest season.

== Concept development ==
Masagana 99 was conceived by the administration of then Philippine President Ferdinand Marcos as way to cope with a nationwide rice shortage arising from the various natural disasters and pest inverstations in 1972.

Launched on May 21, 1973, its goal was to promote Philippine rice self-sufficiency by raising the Philippines' average palay crop yield from 40 cavans (a unit of measure equivalent to 60 kilograms of rice) per hectare to 99 cavans per hectare. The program planned to achieve this by pushing farmers to use newly developed technologies including high-yielding variety (HYV) seeds, low-cost fertilizer, and herbicides.

The program included a supervised credit scheme, which was supposed to provide farmers with the funds needed to pay for the program's technology package. The Central Bank designed subsidized rediscounting facilities for public and private credit institutions throughout the country, encouraging them to give loans to farmers without collateral or other usual borrowing requirements.

== Initial success ==
The program achieved initial success by encouraging farmers to plant new "Miracle Rice" (IR8) variety of rice which the International Rice Research Institute had been developing since 1962, during the administration of President Carlos P. Garcia.

The program was launched at the time the country was experiencing a shortage of supply on rice and was credited for the launching of the Philippine Green Revolution in 1973 which allowed the country to export rice to other Asian countries. The highlights of its short-lived success happened when the Philippines finally attained self-sufficiency in 1975–1976, and was able to export rice to its neighbors in Asia in 1977–1978. But costly subsidies and failure of many farmers-borrowers to repay the loans led to the program benefiting only 3.7% of the country's small rice farmers by 1980.

== Problems with the credit scheme ==
Loan repayment performance under Masagana 99 quickly deteriorated as the program expanded, with collection levels falling from about 90 percent in its early years to about 35 percent in the later phase. Many farmers were unable to repay the loans because they needed to access the program’s technology package: (1) high-yielding rice varieties, (2) fertilizers, (3) pesticides, and (4) herbicides. The decline in repayment placed financial pressure on rural banks, which had greatly expanded their agricultural lending portfolios under government guarantees that proved only fitfully enforced. As non-performing loans increased, an estimated 800 rural banks became insolvent.

== Negative environmental impact ==
Aside from the problems of its credit scheme, however, Masagana also had a negative impact on the environment and on traditional agricultural methods. Masagana 99's package of technological interventions in the form of synthetic fertilizers, herbicides, pesticides, and other chemicals imported from other countries. This resulted in the devastation of indigenous plants and animals, and the eradication of certain pest species only led to the dominance of other pests.

The use of chemicals also depleted the groundwater and saturated rice lands with chemicals, which would eventually lead to lower rice yields. Some farmers also suffered diseases from exposure to pesticides.

Masagana 99 was responsible for convincing the majority of the Philippines' irrigated rice farmers to adopt the use of chemical fertilizers. It also led the Bureau of Plant Industry to focus on chemical fertilizers to eliminate pests such as the rice stemborer because pesticides were cheaper - abandoning a pre-existing Integrated Pest Management approach which used Trichogramma to control stemborer populations.

== Discontinuation ==
National Scientist and former University of the Philippines President Emil Q. Javier notes that by 1980, "Masagana 99 ceased to be of consequence as only 3.7 percent of the small rice farmers were able to borrow." By 1981, the program's problems were apparent enough that Southeast Asian news outlets noted that Masagana 99 and its aquaculture equivalent, Biyayang Dagat, were lacking in funds due to low loan repayment rates. By 1984, the Marcos administration shifted its focus away from Masagana 99 and towards a new program, the Intensified Rice Production Program (IRPP), which like Masagana 99 succeeded in temporarily increasing rice production, but ultimately left its beneficiary-farmers in debt.

== Aftermath ==
According to Carlos Dominguez III who was the agriculture secretary under the administration of President Corazon Aquino, the successor of Marcos, from 1987 to 1989, the program caused about 800 rural banks to go bankrupt, never boosted rice production sufficiently for the country to be able to export rice, and left poor farmers in debt, because the program was used as a vehicle for political patronage.

== Proposed revival ==
President Rodrigo Duterte expressed his interest to revive the program in October 2016. The plan met opposition from MASIPAG, a group of farmers and scientists, saying that revival of the program will bring back issues such as debt, replacement of traditional varieties with newer ones, and the promotion of pesticide use which they said will harm animals, farmers, and crops and insisted that only large firms benefited from the program. The Department of Agriculture noted that the old variety used in the Masagana 99 program is already phased out and the Masagana 99 can use newer varieties of rice and insisted that environmentally friendly pesticides will be promoted under the potentially revived Masagana 99.

== See also ==
- Agriculture in the Philippines
- Rice production in the Philippines
