= Agriculture in the Philippines =

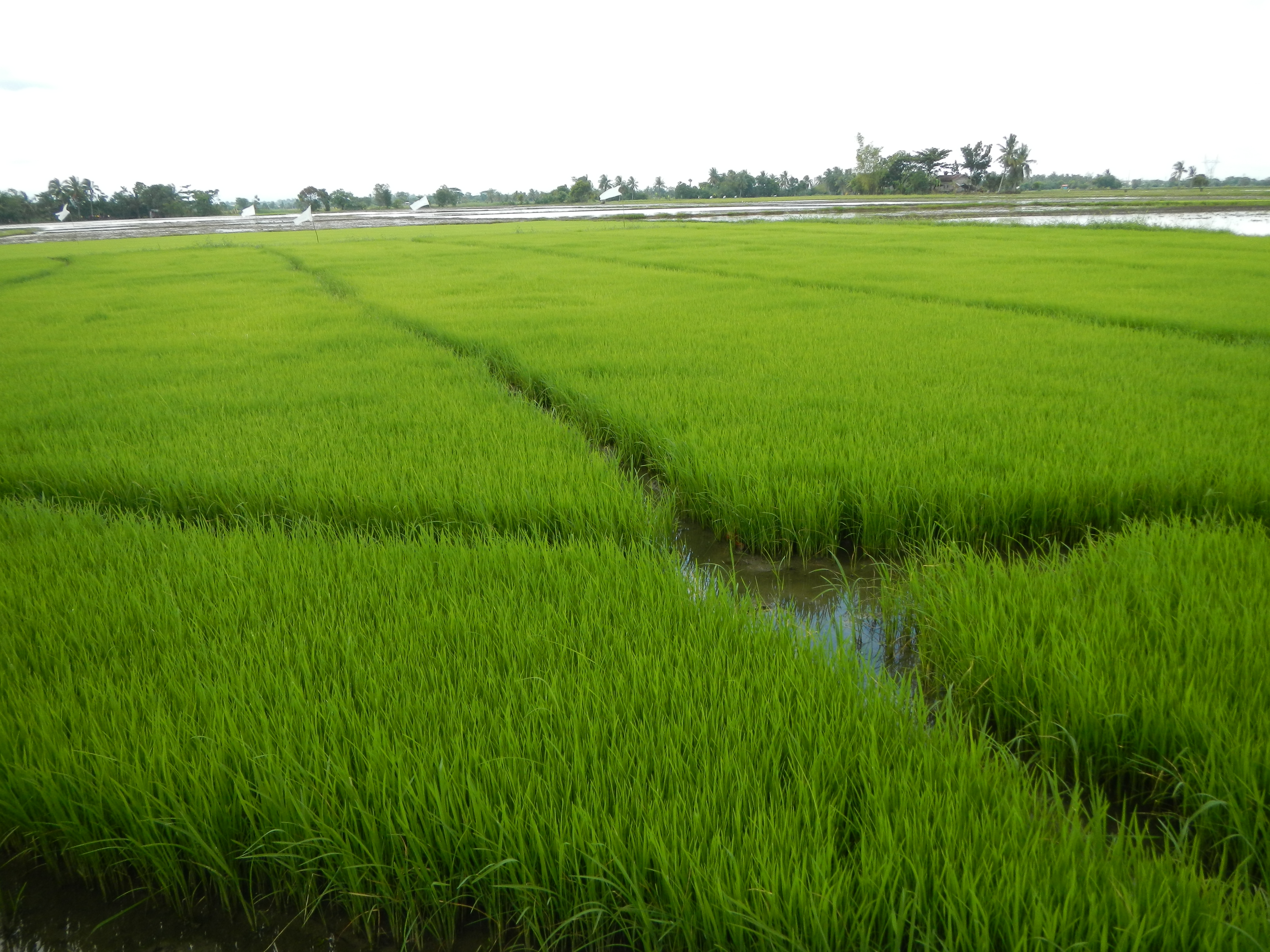
Rice paddies in Balagtas, Bulacan

Agriculture in the Philippines is a major sector of the economy, ranking third among the sectors in 2022 behind only Services and Industry. Its outputs include staples like rice and corn, but also export crops such as coffee, cavendish banana, pineapple and pineapple products, breadfruit, coconut, sugar, and mango. The sector continues to face challenges, however, due to the pressures of a growing population. As of 2022, the sector employs 24% of the Filipino workforce and it accounts for 8.9% of the total GDP.

The Philippines is one of the most vulnerable agricultural systems to monsoons and other extreme weather events, which are expected to create more uncertainty as climate change affects the Philippines. However, the Food and Agriculture Organization has described the local policy measures as some of the most proactive in risk reduction.

== History ==
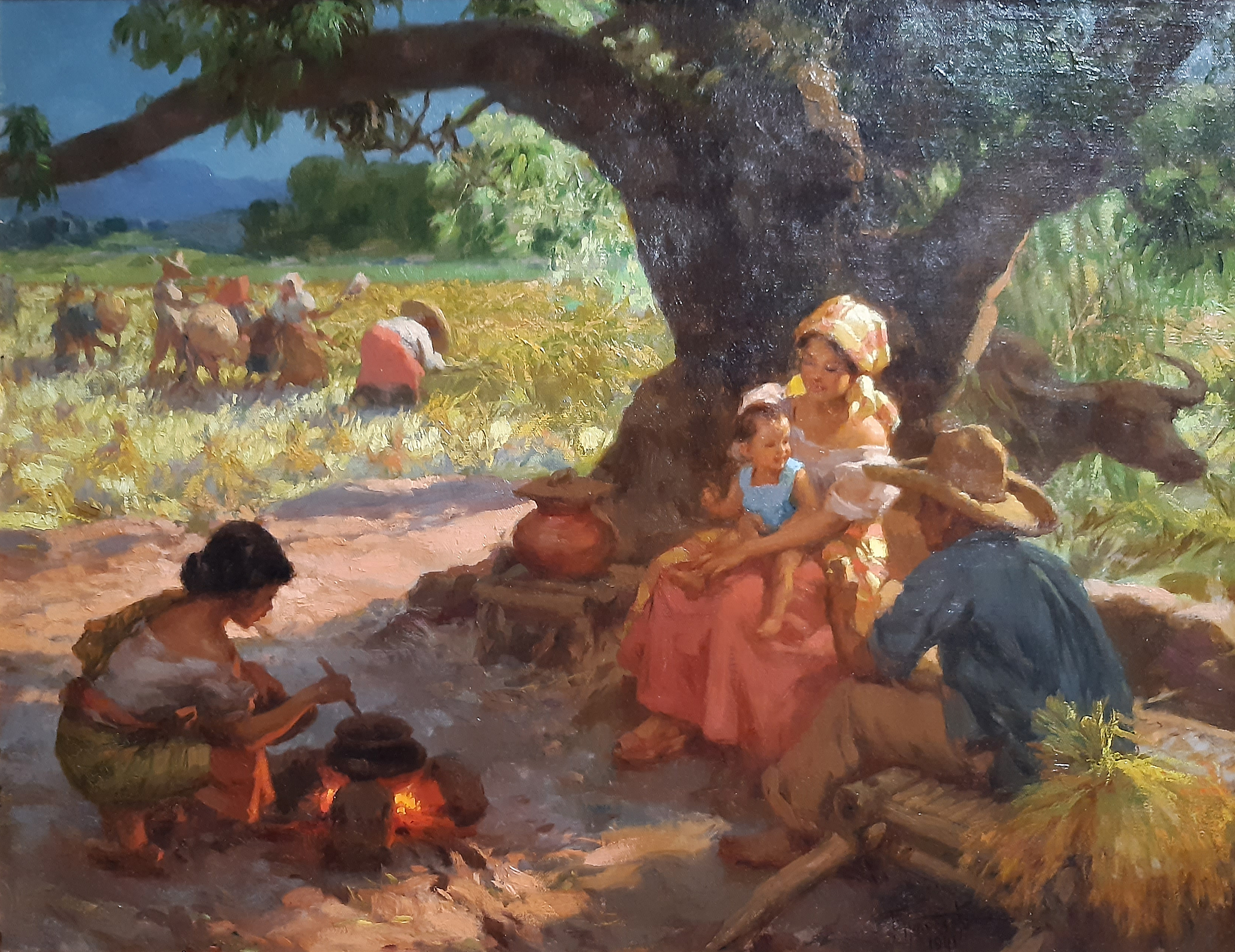
Filipino famers as depicted in Fernando Amorsolo's painting.

=== Emergence of agriculture in the Philippines} ===
The means by which agriculture expanded into the Philippines is argued by many different anthropologists and the exact date of its origin is unknown. However, there are proxy indicators and other pieces of evidence that allow anthropologists to get an idea of when different crops reached the Philippines and how they may have originated. Rice is an important agricultural crop today in the Philippines and many countries throughout the world import rice and other products from the Philippines.

=== Present day ===
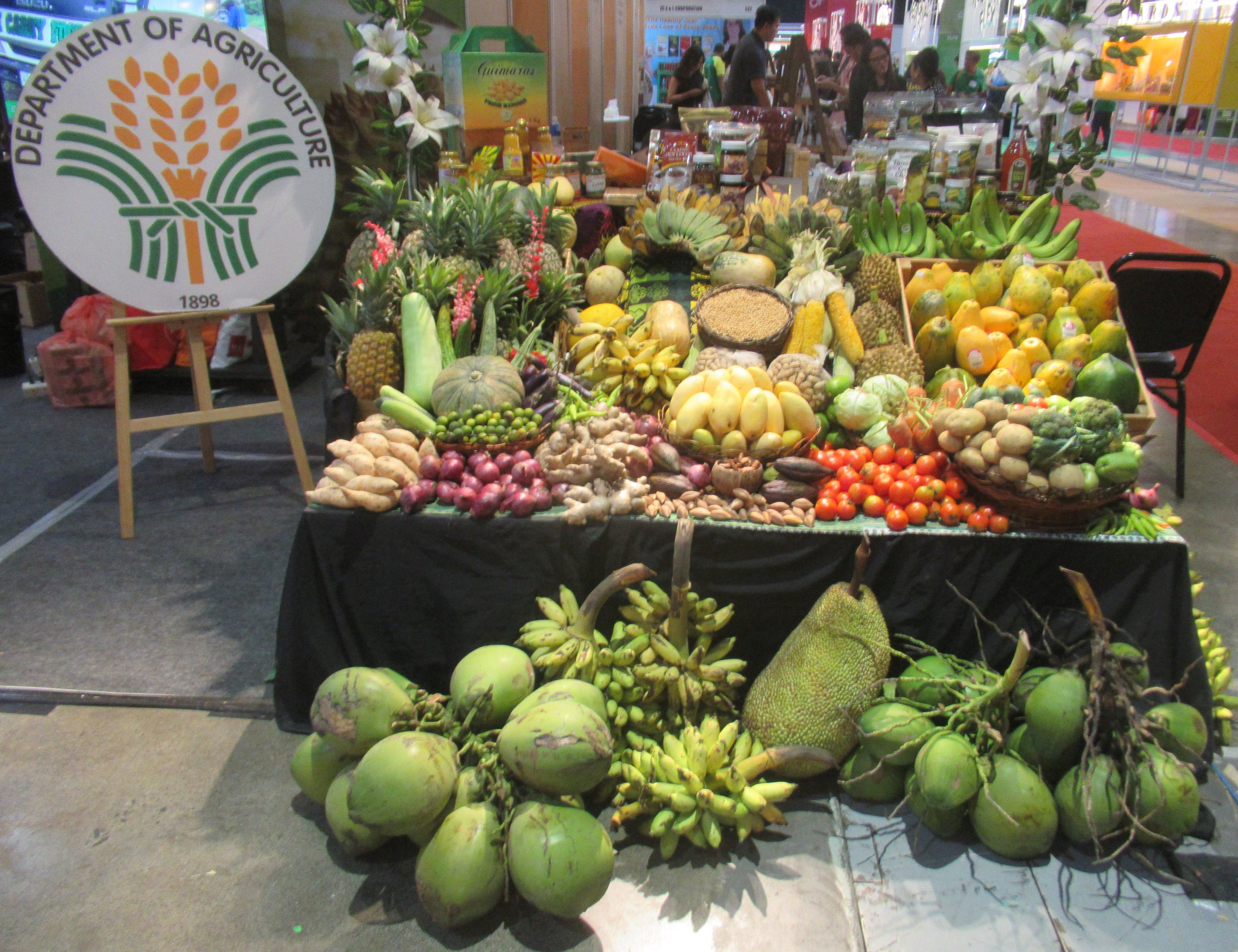
Philippines agricultural products

In 2022, the country's chief economist Arsenio Balisacan said that Philippine agriculture was in crisis, citing such issues as the high price of meat and rice and low profitability for farmers.

The Philippine Development Plan places a priority on the modernization of the agriculture sector.

== Farmers ==
There are 10.66 million people employed in agriculture in the Philippines. The average daily wage for farmers is PHP331.10. Men on average earn PHP335.00 a day, while women earn an average PHP304.60 a day.

Many of the Philippines' farmers operate small-sized farms which have been granted to them as a result of several decades of land reform programs. While land reform is enshrined in the Philippines' 1987 Constitution as a means of ensuring the welfare of small farmers, the land distribution component of these land reform programs has largely not yet been followed through with the agricultural services and infrastructure development needed to make these smallholder farms economically efficient or productive. Economists such as Bernardo M. Villegas have cited the potential of interventions such as Farmers' Cooperatives which would allow smallholder farms to achieve the economies of scale needed to become more economically viable.

Many Filipino farmers live in poverty due to a combination of factors, including economic policy, environmental, land ownership issues, and government corruption.

== Profession ==
In the Philippines, the official professional designation is Registered Agriculturist (R.Agr.) by virtue of the Philippine Agriculturist Act of 2025 or Republic Act No. 12215. Prior to the enactment of the law, the profession has already been regulated by the Professional Regulation Commission and the Professional Board of Agriculture by virtue of Republic Act No. 8435 or Agriculture and Fisheries Modernization Act of 1997, which mentioned:

Section 75. Agriculture and Fisheries Board. - There shall be created an Agriculture and Fisheries Board in the Professional Regulation Commission to upgrade the Agriculture and Fisheries profession. Those who have not passed the Civil Service Examination for Fisheries and Agriculture but have served the industry in either private or public capacity for not less than five (5) years shall be automatically granted eligibility by the Board of Examiners. The first board of examination for B.S. Fisheries and/or Agriculture Graduates shall be conducted within one (1) year from the approval of this Act.

A Registered Agriculturist can affix the title "R.Agr." (as name suffix) or "Agr." (as name prefix) to indicate the profession. The Professional Board of Agriculture was created and established in 2000 by virtue of PRC Resolution No. 2000-663 and the first Agriculturist Licensure Examination (ALE) was held in 2003 and has annually been held annually.

== Grains ==
=== Rice ===
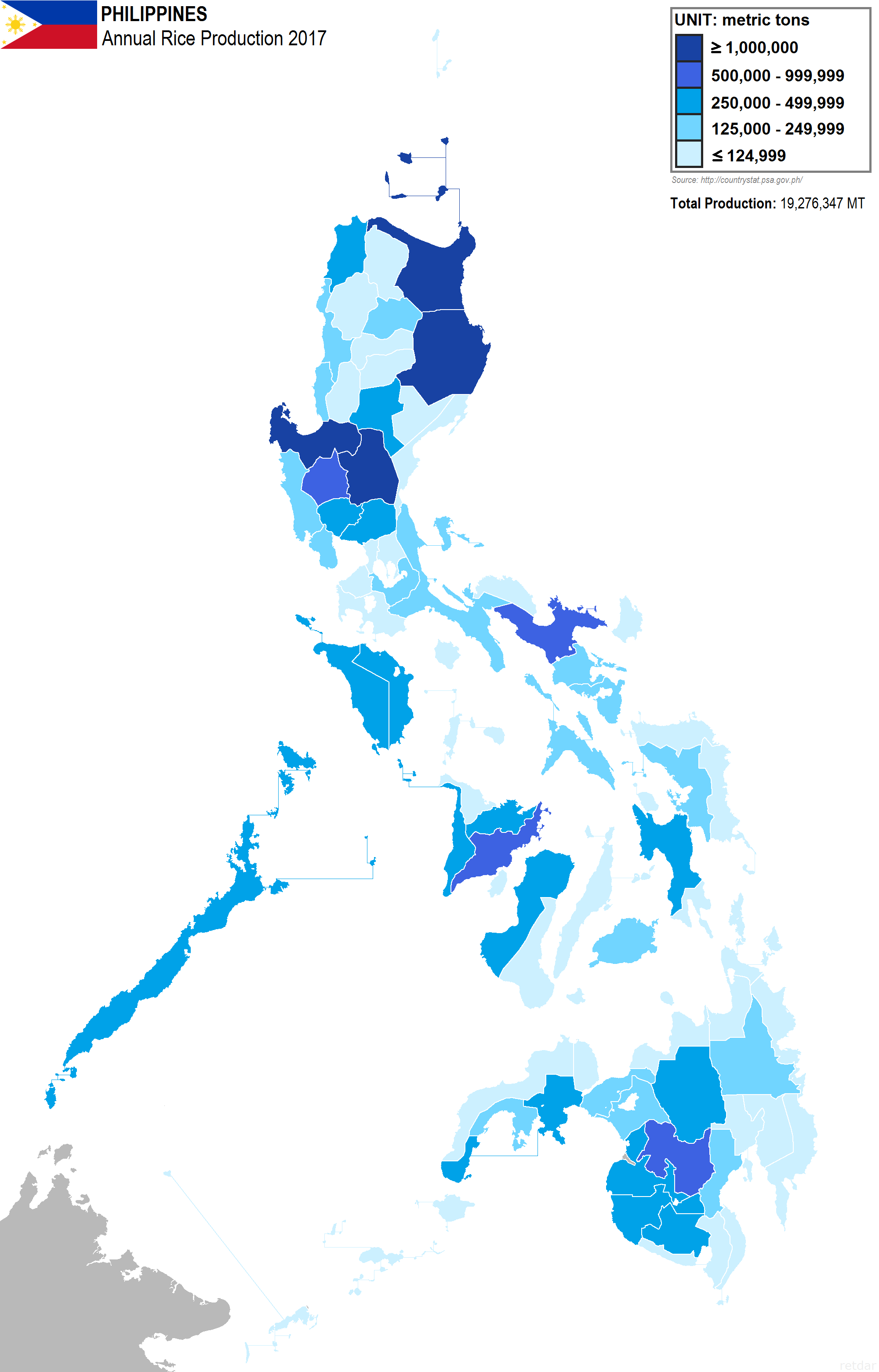
Annual rice production per province, 2017

The Philippines is the 8th largest rice producer in the world, accounting for 2.8% of global rice production. The Philippines was also the world's largest rice importer in 2010. In 2010, nearly 15.7 million metric tons of palay (pre-husked rice) were produced. In 2010, palay accounted for 21.86% percent of gross value added in agriculture and 2.37% of GNP. Self-sufficiency in rice reached 88.93% in 2015.

Rice production in the Philippines has grown significantly since the 1950s. Improved varieties of rice developed during the Green Revolution, including at the International Rice Research Institute based in Los Baños, Laguna Province, have improved crop yields. Crop yields have also improved due to increased use of fertilizers. Average productivity increased from 1.23 metric tons per hectare in 1961 to 3.59 metric tons per hectare in 2009.

Harvest yields have increased significantly by using foliar fertilizer (Rc 62 → 27% increase, Rc 80 → 40% increase, Rc 64 → 86% increase) based on PhilRice National Averages.

In 2024, the Philippines produced 19.1 million metric tons (MMT) of palay, the lowest in four years, while the production of bigas (milled rice) fell to 12.4 MMT and is below the projected rice consumption of 15 MMT for 2025. Falling production has been attributed to climate-related disasters and may also be due to environmental degradation, farmer landlessness, and lack of government assistance.

The government has been promoting the production of golden rice. However, in April 2023, the Supreme Court of the Philippines issued a Writ of Kalikasan ordering the Department of Agriculture to stop the commercial distribution of genetically modified rice and eggplants in the country.

The table below shows some of the agricultural products of the country per region.

Region	Rice	Corn/maize	Coconut	Sugarcane	Pineapple	Watermelon	Banana
Ilocos Region	1,777,122	490,943	39,463	19,512	197	26,936	43,164
Cordillera	400,911	237,823	1,165	51,787	814	141	26,576
Cagayan Valley	2,489,647	1,801,194	77,118	583,808	35,129	7,416	384,134
Central Luzon	3,304,310	271,319	167,737	678,439	1,657	7,103	58,439
Metro Manila	0	0	0	0	0	0	0
Calabarzon	392,907	64,823	1,379,297	1,741,706	88,660	2,950	96,306
Mimaropa	1,081,833	125,492	818,146	0	448	3,192	168,299
Bicol Region	1,264,448	243,908	1,105,743	239,010	130,595	5,598	76,452
Western Visayas	1,565,585	213,362	294,547	1,682,940	12,687	83,336	200,222
Negros Island Region	557,632	185,747	274,315	13,440,259	9,468	546	157,974
Central Visayas	269,801	101,333	274,069	241,573	998	1,161	126,220
Eastern Visayas	955,709	91,145	1,165,867	179,363	7,186	670	227,223
Zamboanga Peninsula	661,775	220,180	1,682,121	107	1,657	638	281,856
Northern Mindanao	725,120	1,216,301	1,851,702	3,065,463	1,468,386	2,024	1,832,173
Davao Region	441,868	224,100	2,246,188	208,743	26,880	1,070	3,455,014
Soccsksargen	1,291,644	1,239,275	1,159,818	680,383	794,334	2,132	1,159,091
Caraga	653,431	118,774	804,722	0	2,682	3,010	259,738
Bangsamoro	488,215	673,036	1,393,168	113,343	921	80	531,048

=== Corn/maize ===
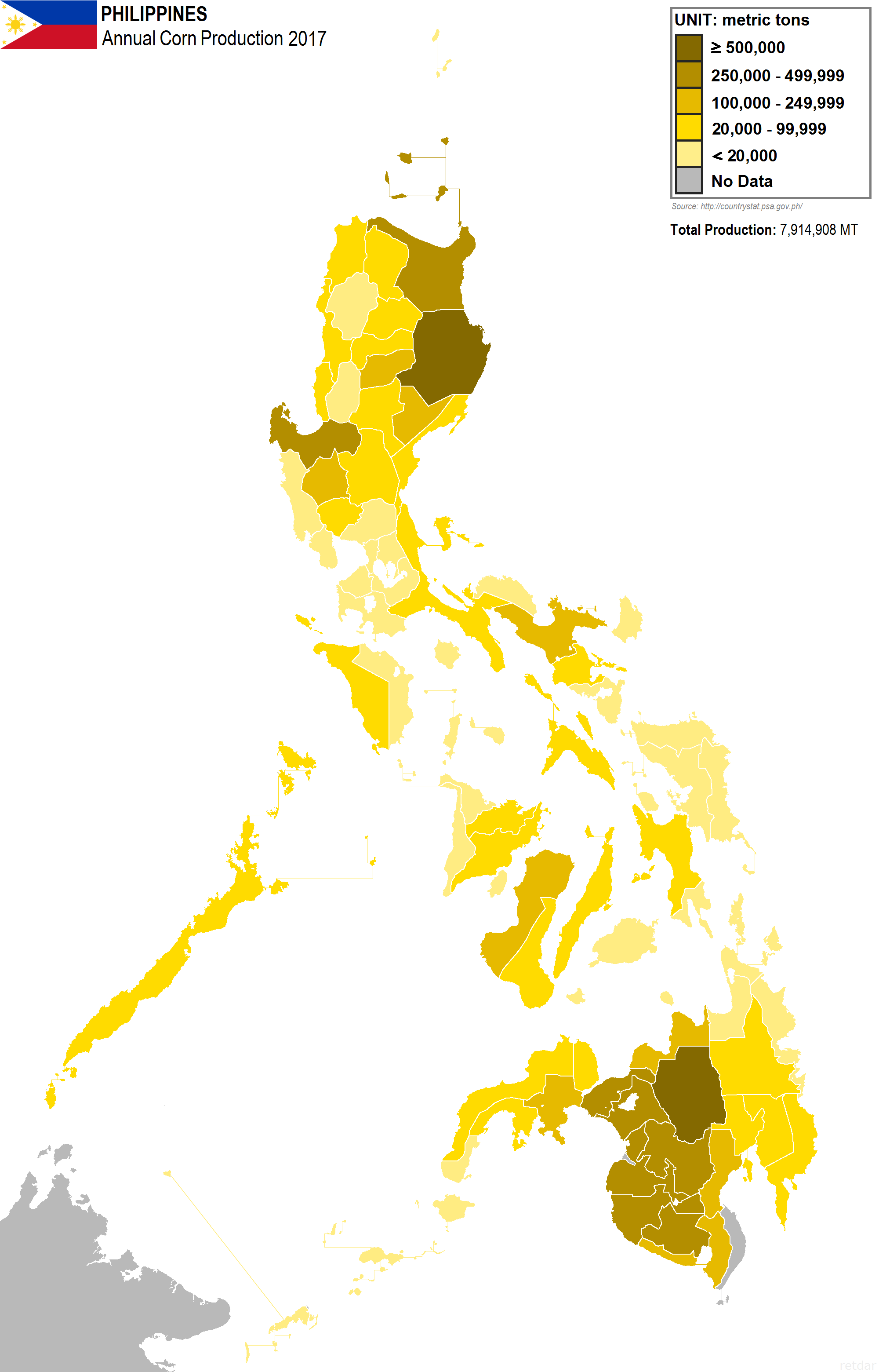
2017 Annual Corn Production of Philippine provinces

Corn/maize is the second most important crop in the Philippines. 600,000 farm households are employed in different businesses in the corn value chain. As of 2012, around 2.594 million hectares (6.41×10^{6} acres) of land is under corn cultivation and the total production was 7.408 million metric tons (8.166×10^{6} short tons). The government has been promoting Bt corn for hardiness against insects and higher yields.

== Other food crops ==
=== Chocolate ===
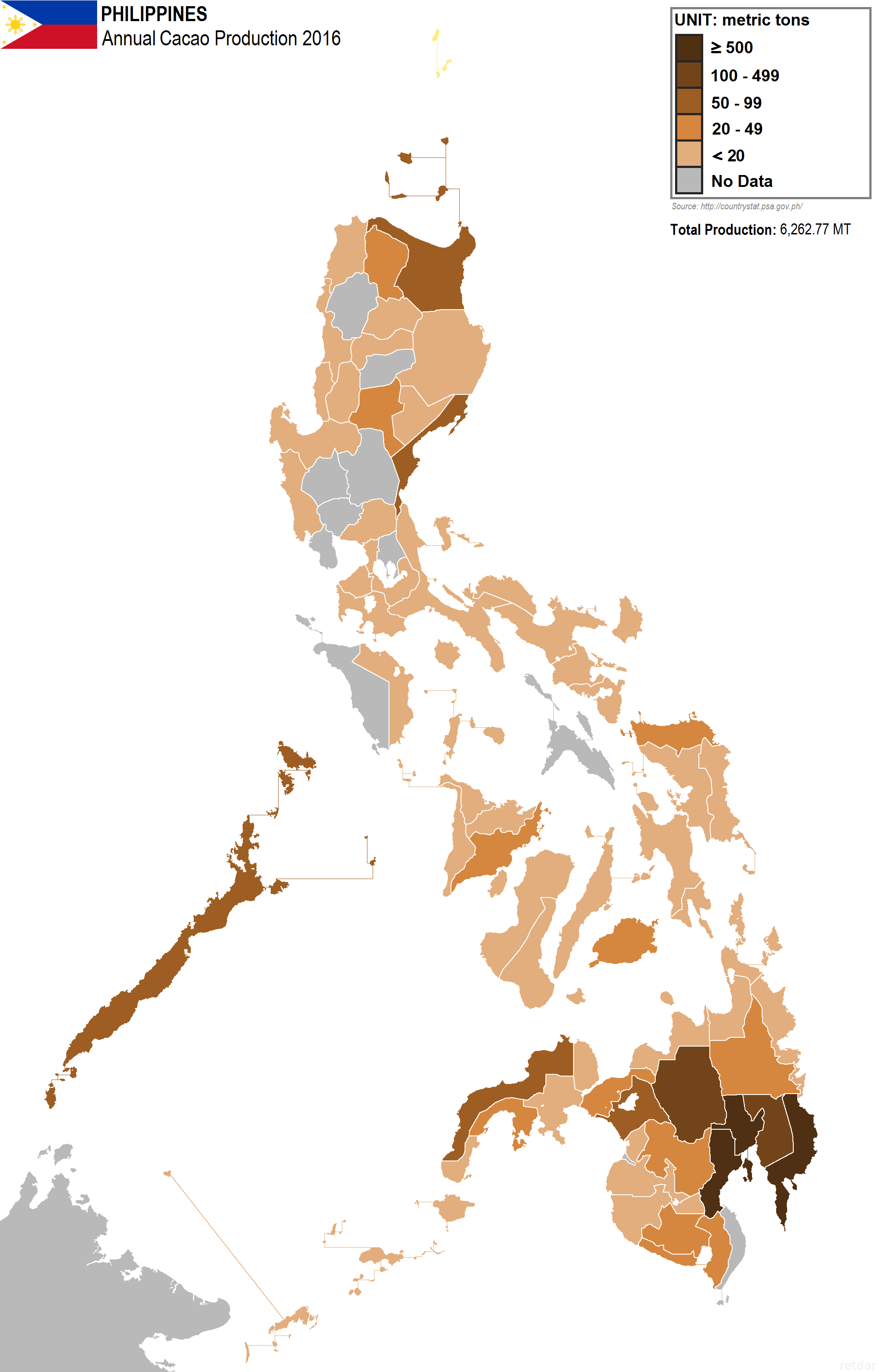
Annual cacao production of Philippine provinces 2016

The chocolate industry in the Philippines developed after the introduction of the cocoa tree to Philippine agriculture. The growing of cacao or cocoa boasts a long history stretching from the colonial times. Originating from Mesoamerican forests, cacao was first introduced by the Spanish colonizers four centuries ago. Since then the Philippine cocoa industry has been the primary producer of cocoa beans in Southeast Asia. There are many areas of production of cacao in the Philippines, owing to soil and climate. The chocolate industry is currently on a small to medium scale.

=== Coffee ===
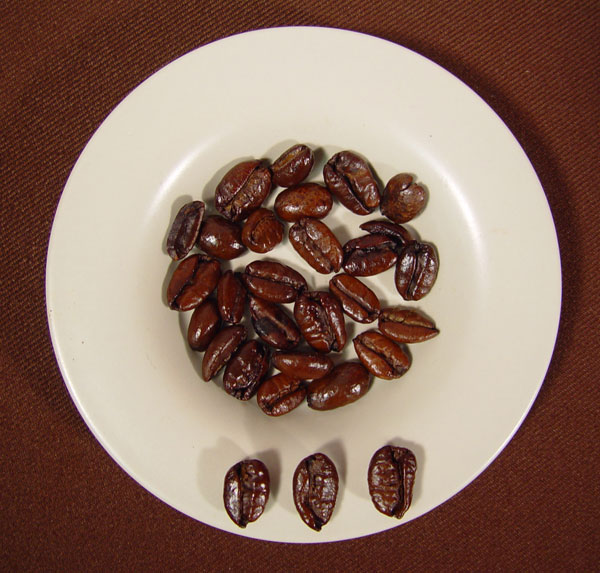
Liberica coffee beans from Mindoro.

Coffee is an important agricultural product in the Philippines, and is one of the Philippines' most important export products aside from being in high demand in the country's local consumer market.

The Philippines is one of the few countries that produce the four main viable coffee varieties; Arabica, Liberica (Barako), Excelsa and Robusta. 90 percent of coffee produced in the country is Robusta. There have been efforts to revitalize the coffee industry.

As of 2014, the Philippines produces 25,000 metric tons of coffee and is ranked 110th in terms of output. However local demand for coffee is high with 100,000 metric tons of coffee consumed in the country per year.

Coffee was said to have been introduced in the Philippines around 1696 when the Dutch introduced coffee in the islands. It was once a major industry in the Philippines, which by the 1800s was the fourth largest coffee producing nation.

However, Islamic culture has been pervaded by coffee drinkers from the 1500s. And with the close ties of the Philippines to the Islamic World since the 12th century, it would not be impossible to speculate that coffee has been in the Philippines before the Dutch "introduced" it.

=== Coconuts ===
Coconuts play an important role in the national economy of the Philippines. According to figures published in December 2015 by the Food and Agriculture Organization of the United Nations, it is the world's largest producer of coconuts, producing 19,500,000 tonnes in 2015. Production in the Philippines is generally concentrated in medium-sized farms. There are 3.5 million hectares dedicated to coconut production in the Philippines, which accounts for 25 percent of total agricultural land in the country. In 1989, it was estimated that between 25 percent and 33 percent of the population was at least partly dependent on coconuts for their livelihood. Historically, the Southern Tagalog and Bicol regions of Luzon and the Eastern Visayas were the centers of coconut production. In the 1980s, Western Mindanao and Southern Mindanao also became important coconut-growing regions.

=== Fruits ===
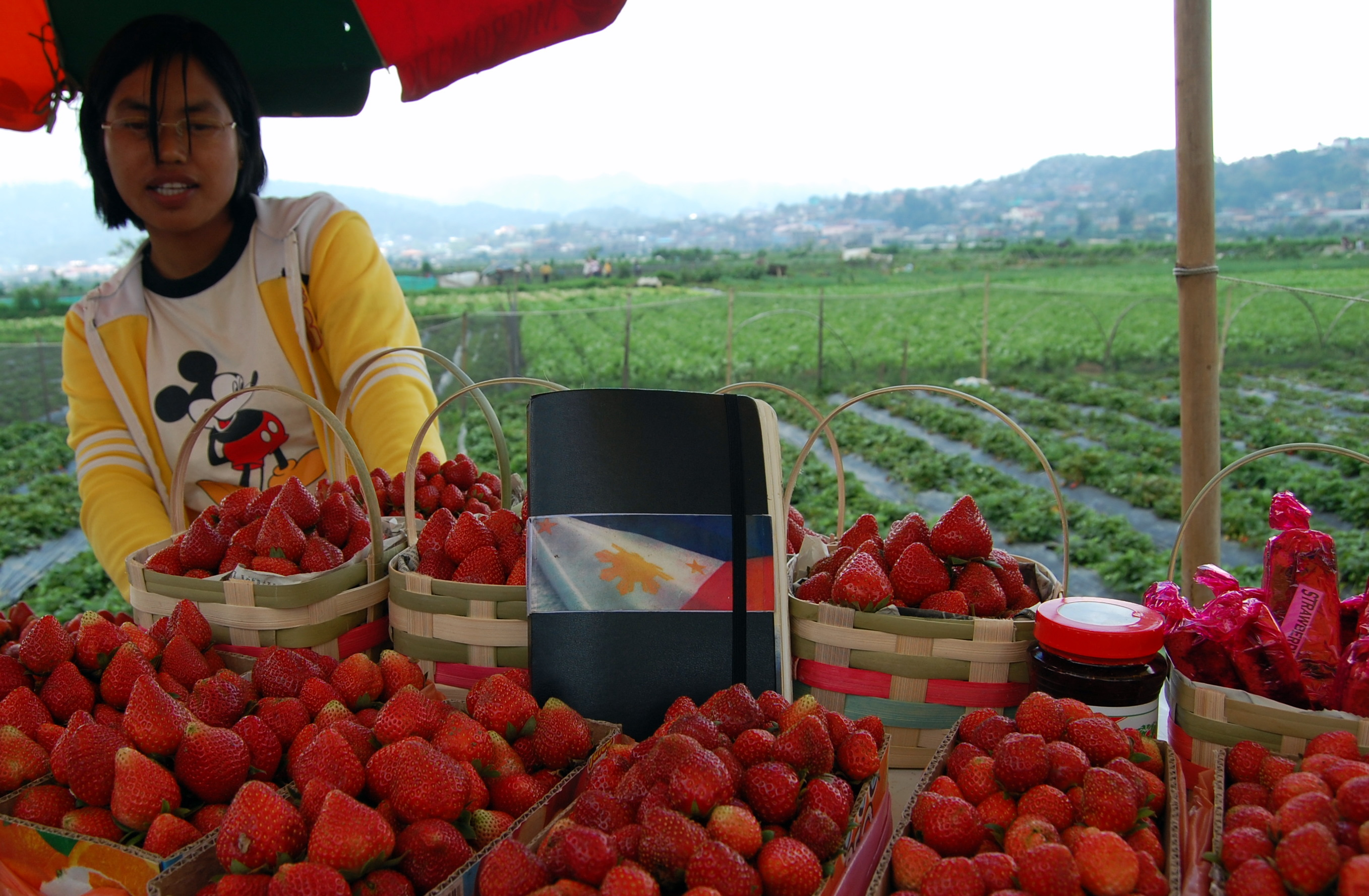
Strawberries grown in the Philippines.

The Philippines is the world's third largest producer of pineapples, producing more than 2.4 million of tonnes in 2015. The Philippines was in the top three banana producing countries in 2010, including India and China. Davao and Mindanao contribute heavily to the total national banana crop. Mangoes are the third most important fruit crop of the country based on export volume and value next to bananas and pineapples.

=== Sugar ===
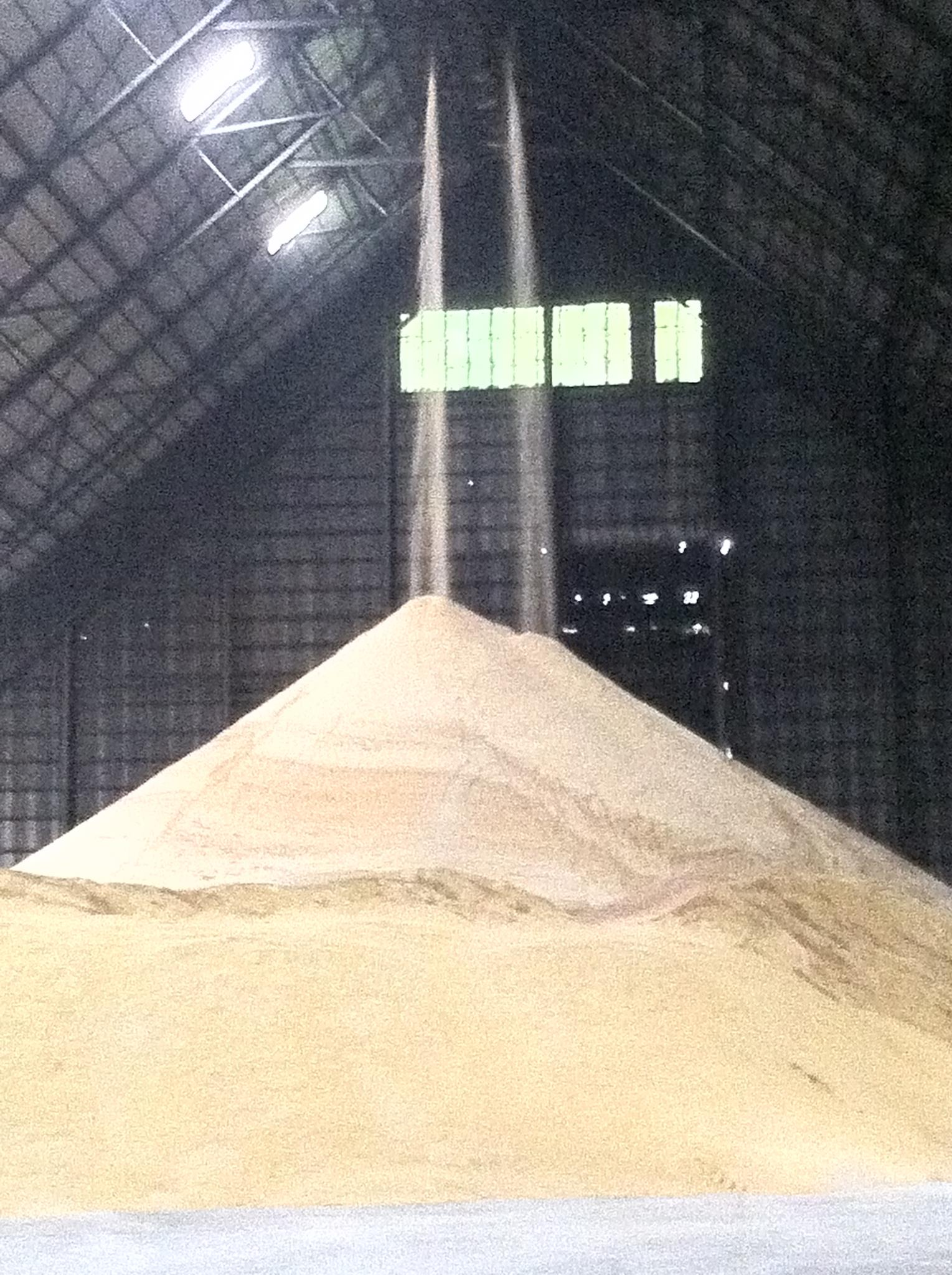
Raw sugar produced in a mill in the nation.

There are at least 19 provinces and 11 regions that produce sugarcane in the Philippines. A range from 360,000 to 390,000 hectares are devoted to sugarcane production. The largest sugarcane areas are found in the Negros Island Region, which accounts for 51% of sugarcane areas planted. This is followed by Mindanao which accounts for 20%; Luzon by 17%; Panay by 07%; and Eastern Visayas by 04%. It is estimated that as of 2012, the industry provides direct employment to 700,000 sugarcane workers spread across 19 sugar producing provinces.

Sugar growing in the Philippines pre-dates colonial Spanish contact. Sugar became the most important agricultural export of the Philippines between the late eighteenth century and the mid-1970s. During the 1950s and 60s, more than 20 percent income of Philippine exports came from the sugar industry. Between 1913 and 1974, the Philippines sugar industry enjoyed favoured terms of trade with the US, with special access to the protected and subsidized the American sugar market.

==== Negros famine ====
The Negros famine took place on Negros island in the Philippines in the mid-1980s, during the waning days of the Marcos dictatorship. It was a key moment in the history of sugar production in the Philippines, as well as the broader political history of the Philippines. Caused by the Marcos administration's efforts to control sugar production through the NASUTRA monopoly held by Marcos crony Roberto Benedicto and by a sudden crash in international sugar prices, it created what popularly came to be known as a "social volcano", with tensions culminating in the Escalante massacre, and with negative effects still felt even after the ouster of Ferdinand Marcos and his cronies during the 1986 People Power Revolution.

In 1984, over 190,000 sugar workers lost their livelihood, and about a million sacadas and their families in Negros suffered in the famine. By 1985, a survey by the National Nutrition Council of the Philippines estimated that about 350,000 children – 40 percent of Negros Occidental residents under the age of 14 – were suffering from malnutrition. The 1985 infant death statistics at Bacolod City Hospital rose 67 percent, and Negros' infant mortality rose to nearly double the national average, with most of the deaths attributed to malnutrition.

== Animal agriculture ==
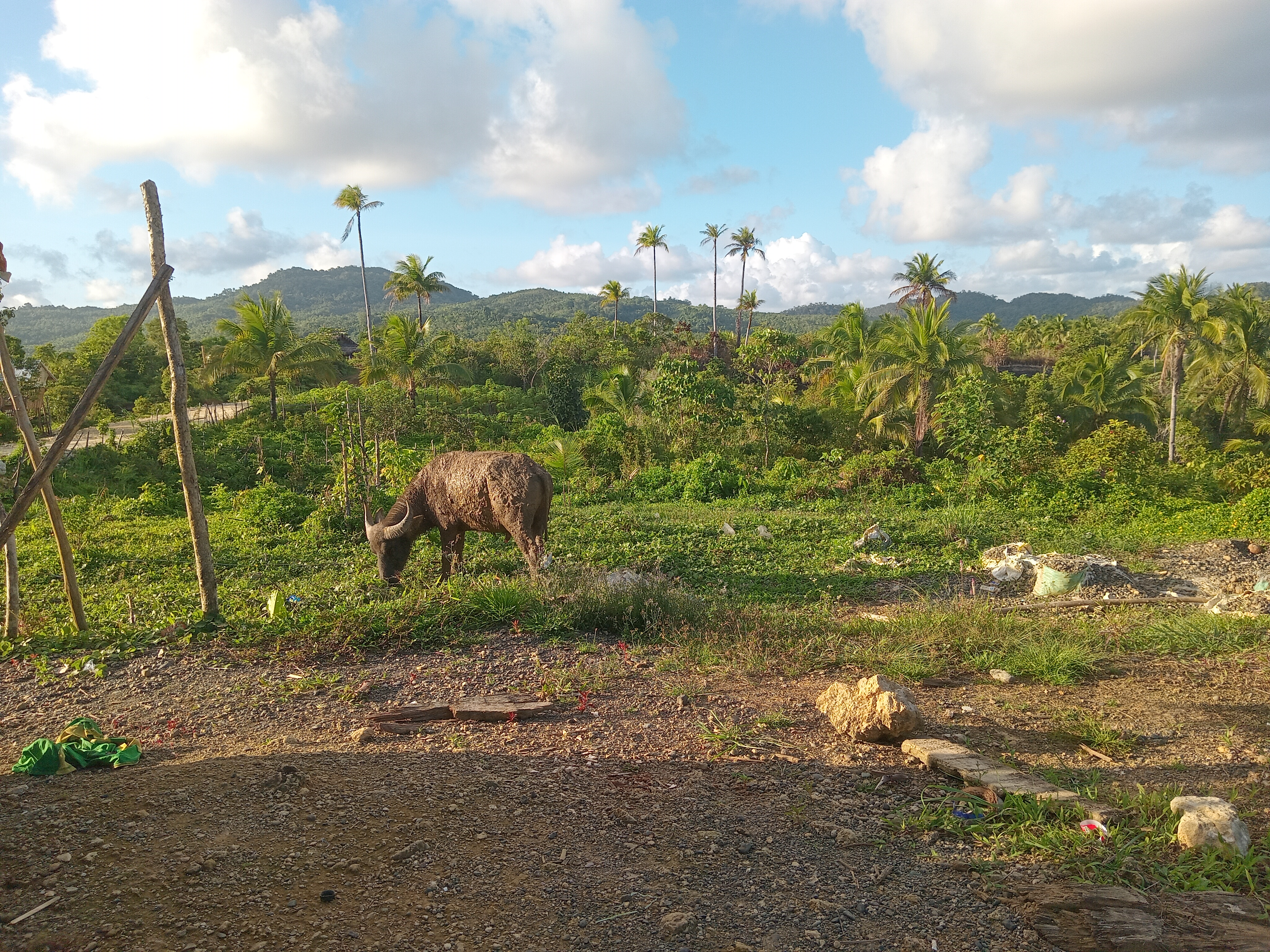
A cattle farm in Borongan City, Eastern Samar

Domesticated animals in the Philippines include pigs, chickens, water buffalo, goats, cats, and dogs. Domestication is when a species is selectively bred to produce certain traits that are seen as desirable. Some desirable traits include quicker growth and maturity, increased fertility, adaptability to various conditions, and living in herds. Domesticated animals play an important socioeconomic role in the Philippines, as seen through their widespread use in rituals.

=== Aquaculture ===
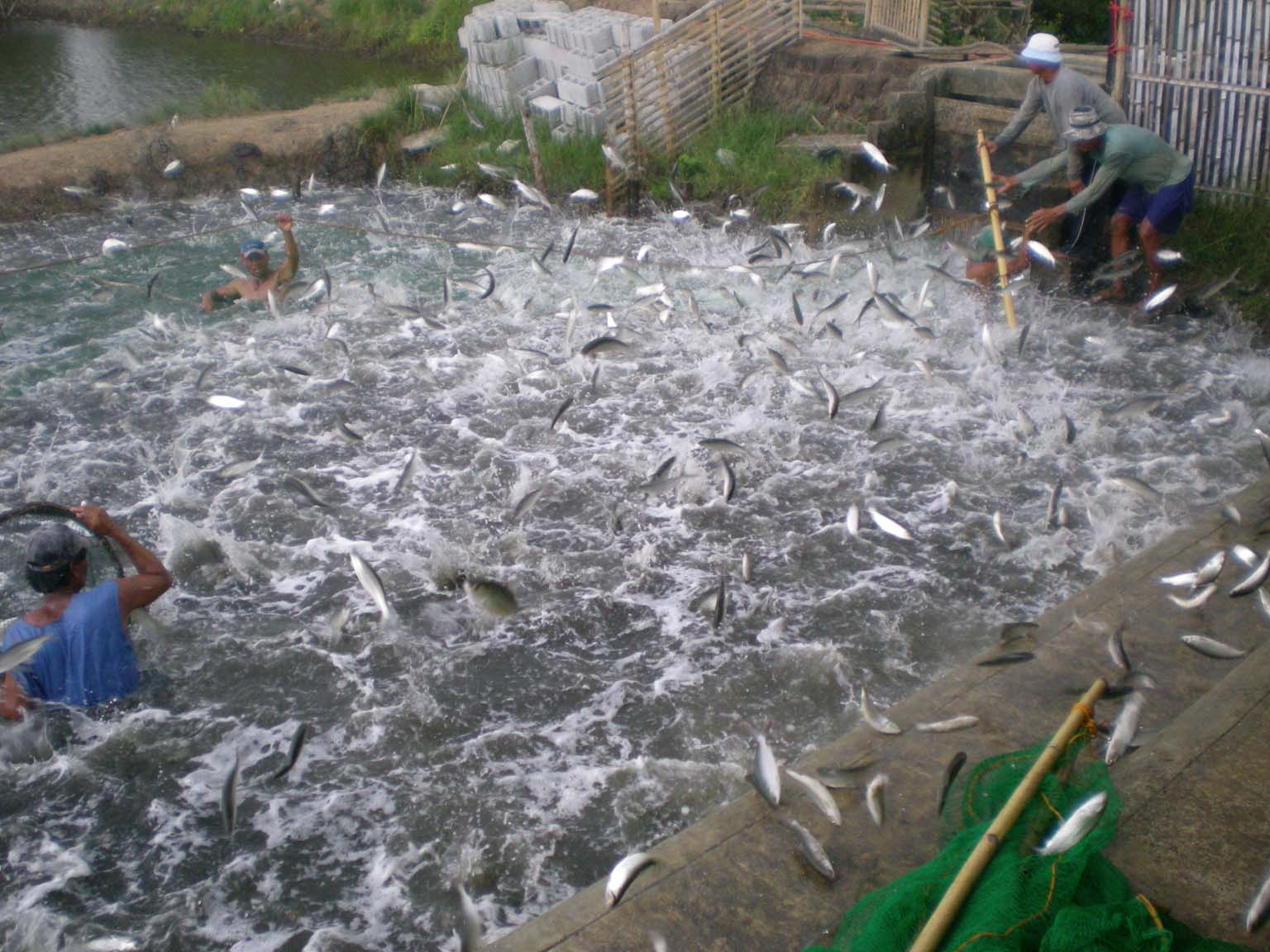
A fish pond in Ivisan

Aquaculture makes up a substantial proportion of the overall output of Philippine fisheries. It has a long history in the archipelago, with wild-caught milkfish being farmed in tidally-fed fish ponds for centuries. Modern aquaculture is carried out in freshwater, brackish water, and seawater throughout the country through a variety of methods.

The most prominent farmed commodities are milkfish and tilapia. Tilapia is farmed in freshwater, while milkfish can be farmed anywhere. Other fish species are also farmed, as well as shrimp, crabs, lobsters, and molluscs. Seaweed is mostly farmed to produce carrageenan. Regulation of aquaculture generally falls to the cities and municipalities in which aquaculture farms are located, and public land and water can be rented for aquaculture from the national government.

Aquaculture has made up an increasingly large proportion of fisheries products produced in the Philippines, and there has been considerable research into improving aquacultural output. Philippine output in total makes up 1% of global aquaculture production, and the country is the fourth-largest producer of seaweed. Aquaculture products are sold alongside wild-caught products in ports. Resulting seafood products are often consumed domestically, although some high-value goods are exported.

The aquaculture industry directly employs over 230,000 individuals. While some workers own their output, many are employees of influential landowners. The creation of aquaculture ponds has destroyed large areas of mangroves, and the establishment of aquaculture in water bodies has created friction with capture fisheries. Some species imported for aquaculture have become invasive species, and aquaculture has directly introduced pollution into some ecosystems.

=== Crocodile ===
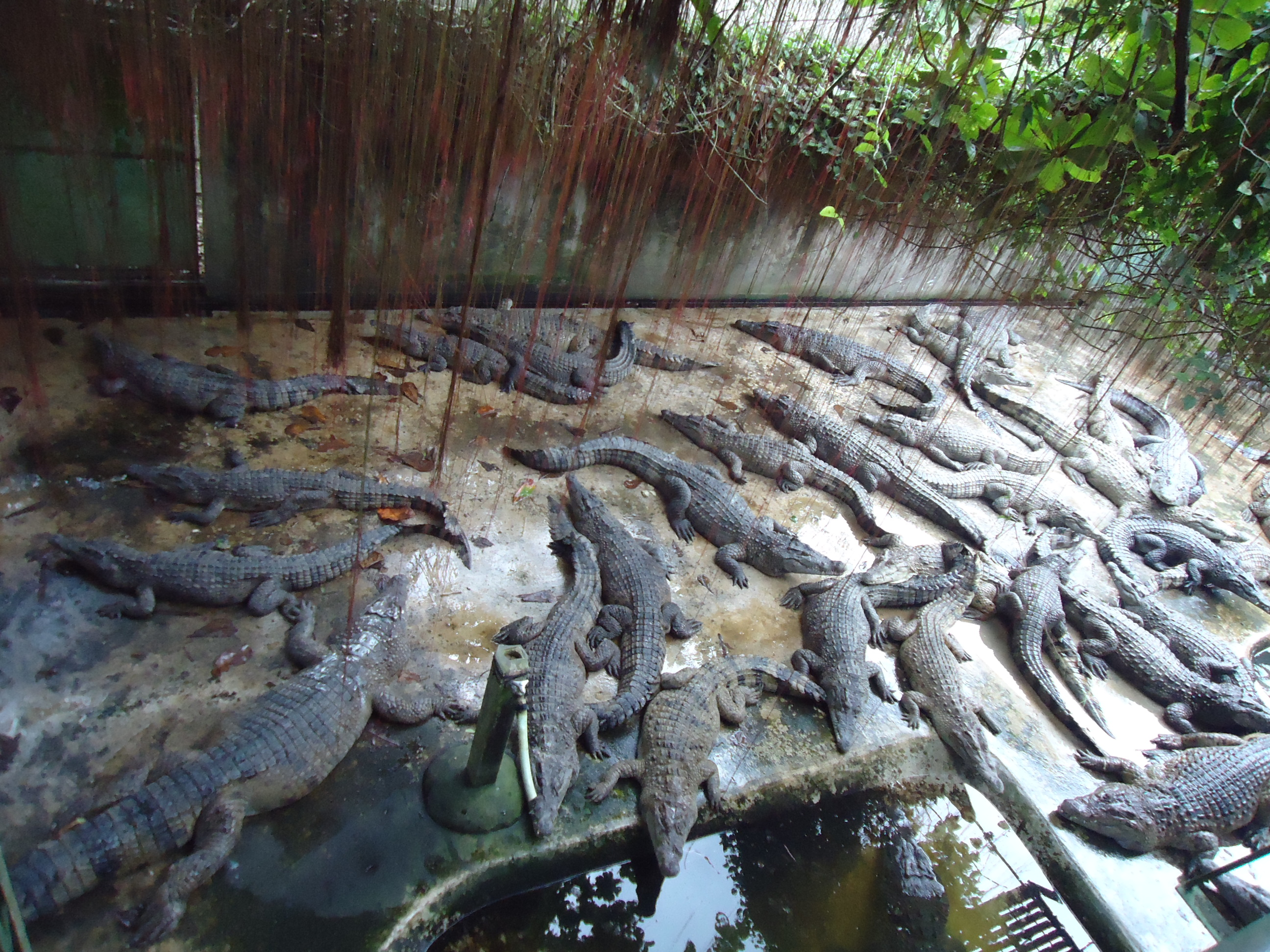
Philippine crocodiles (Crocodylus mindorensis) in a crocodile farm in Palawan, Philippines, in 2010.

Crocodile farming in the Philippines refers to agricultural industries involving the raising and harvesting of crocodiles for the commercial production of Crocodile meat and crocodile leather.

In the Philippines, crocodile farmers breed and raise two species of Philippine crocodiles: the Philippine saltwater crocodile (Crocodylus porosus) and the Philippine freshwater crocodile (Crocodylus mindorensis). Farms that trade crocodile skin are regulated by the Convention on International Trade in Endangered Species (CITES).

Crocodiles help maintain the balance of Philippine ecosystems such as wetlands; crocodile farming in the Philippines is also geared towards the rescue and conservation of both C. porosus and the "endangered and endemic" C. mindorensis. Crocodile farms also contribute to tourism in the Philippines and offer public education about crocodiles.

=== Ostrich ===
The business of ostrich farming in the Philippines began in the Philippines in 1996. It was started by Lorenzo U. Limketkai, an engineer, and his son Heintje Limketkai. Heintje Limketkai took a month-long training course on ostrich farming in Australia. After that training, the Limketkais established their ostrich farming business and named it as the Philippine Ostrich and Crocodile Farms, Inc., becoming the first combined ostrich and crocodile farm in the country.

=== Pigs ===
In recent years, pork importation has increased due to African Swine Fever (ASF). While the policy aimed to stabilize consumer prices, local hog raisers reported lower farmgate prices despite high feed costs, raising concerns over the impact on domestic swine production.

== Other crops ==
=== Abaca ===
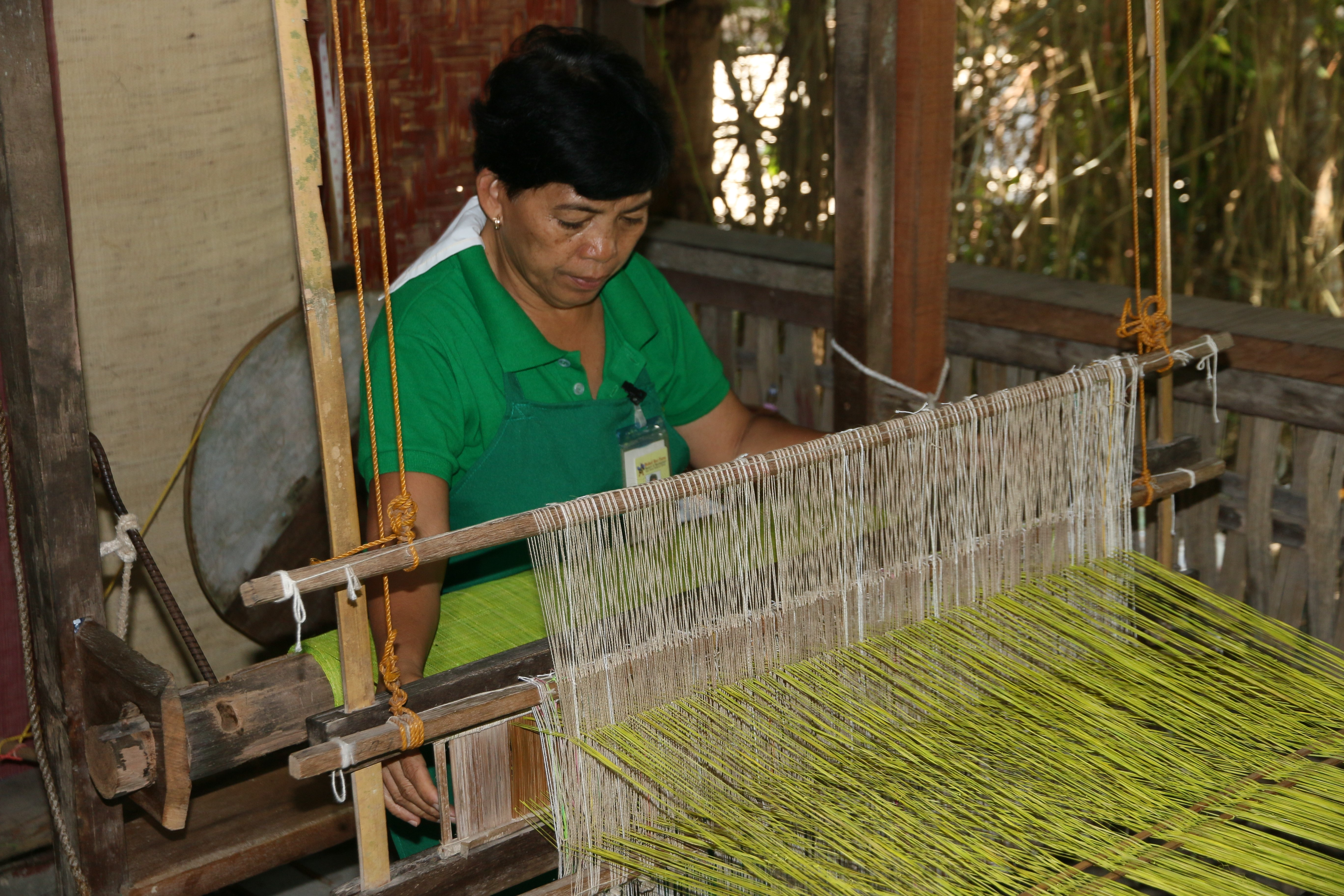
Abaca weaving in a Bohol bee farm

According to the Philippine Fiber Industry Development Authority, the Philippines provided 87.4% of the world's abaca in 2014, earning the Philippines US$111.33 million. The demand is still greater than the supply. The remainder came from Ecuador (12.5%) and Costa Rica (0.1%). The Bicol region in the Philippines produced 27,885 metric tons of abaca in 2014, the largest of any Philippine region. The Philippine Rural Development Program (PRDP) and the Department of Agriculture reported that in 2009–2013, Bicol Region had 39% share of Philippine abaca production while overwhelming 92% comes from Catanduanes Island. Eastern Visayas, the second largest producer had 24% and the Davao Region, the third largest producer had 11% of the total production. Around 42 percent of the total abaca fiber shipments from the Philippines went to the United Kingdom in 2014, making it the top importer. Germany imported 37.1 percent of abaca pulp from the Philippines, importing around 7,755 metric tons (MT). Sales of abaca cordage surged 20 percent in 2014 to a total of 5,093 MT from 4,240 MT, with the United States holding around 68 percent of the market.

=== Rubber ===
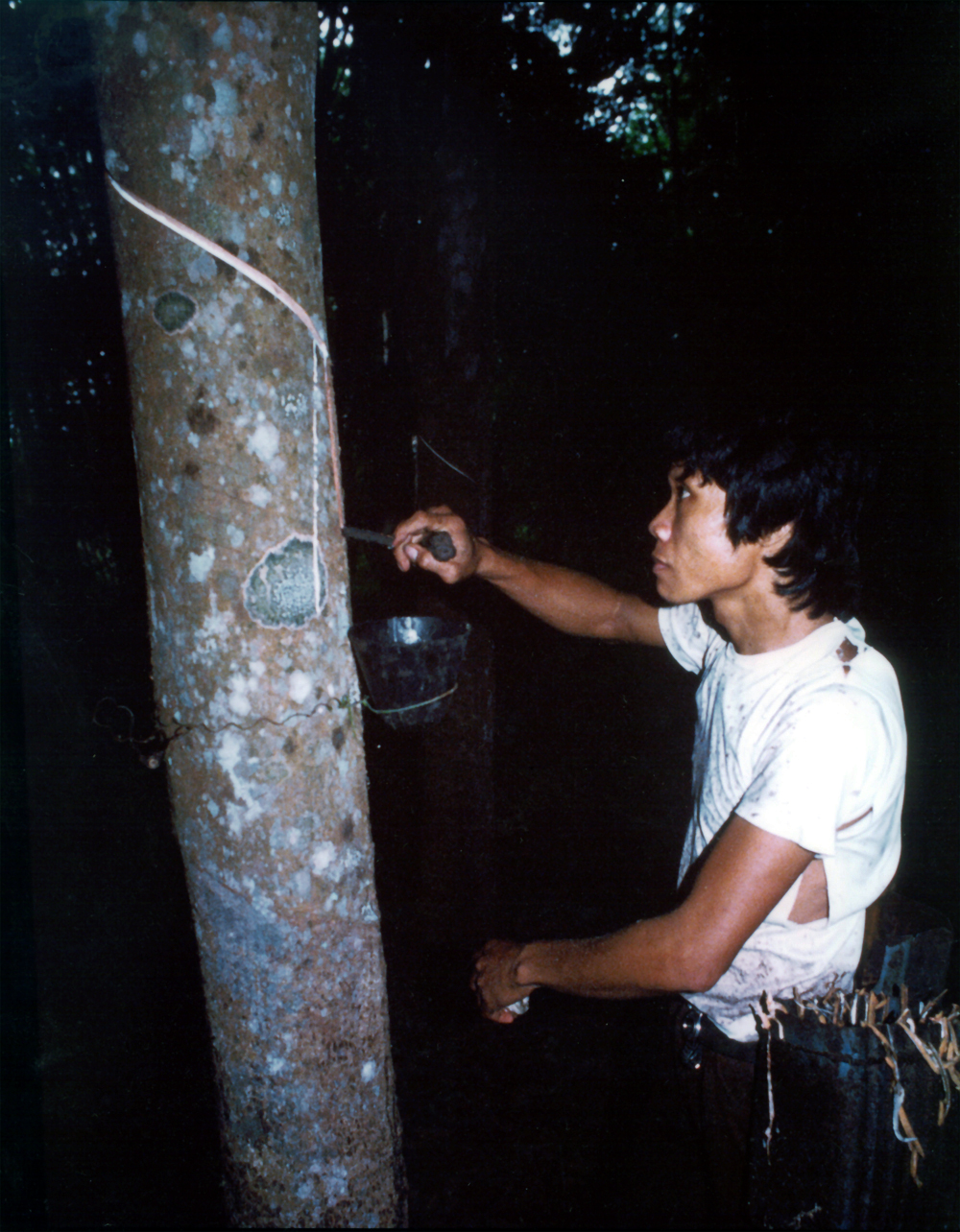
A plantation worker in Basilan in 1984 cuts into a rubber tree to harvest latex used as a main ingredient in making natural rubber.

There are an estimated 458,000 families dependent upon the cultivation of rubber trees. Rubber is mainly planted in Mindanao, with some plantings in Luzon and the Visayas. As of 2013, the total rubber production is 111,204 tons.

== Government ==
The Food and Agriculture Organization described local policy measures as some of the most proactive in risk reduction.

The government supports the approval and cultivation of genetically modified crops. However, the Supreme Court issued injunctions against genetically modified products in 2015 and 2023. Farmers and environmentalists have held demonstrations and filed court petitions protesting the promotion, cultivation, and sale of genetically modified products in the Philippines.

=== Department of Agriculture ===
The Department of Agriculture (DA; Filipino: Kagawaran ng Agrikultura) is the executive department of the Philippine government responsible for the promotion of agricultural and fisheries development and growth. It has its headquarters at Elliptical Road corner Visayas Avenue, Diliman, Quezon City.

The department is currently led by the secretary of agriculture, nominated by the president of the Philippines and confirmed by the Commission on Appointments. The secretary is a member of the Cabinet. The current secretary is Francisco Tiu Laurel Jr., who assumed office on November 3, 2023.

=== Land reform ===
Land reform in the Philippines has long been a contentious issue rooted in the concentration of land ownership in landed elites during the Spanish colonial period. Some state-led land reform initiatives began during the American colonial period, following independence in response to the Huk Rebellion, during martial law, and especially following the People Power Revolution in 1986.

The current law, the Comprehensive Agrarian Reform Program (CARP), was passed in 1986 but its implementation remains unfinished to this day. Strong peasant movement mobilization that maximized CARP for land claims in the 1990s made significant yet partial land redistribution possible, encompassing about half of total agricultural lands and benefitting three-fifths of all agricultural households. However, loopholes and weaknesses in the law have been used to evade and reverse reforms.

Aside from pushing for the completion of land redistribution under CARP, peasant movements have called attention to increasing violence against land claimants, reversals of redistribution in favor of former and new landowners, aggressive agricultural land-use conversions, and lack of government support services for beneficiaries. As of 2026, the Department of Agrarian Reform says 700,000 hectares of agricultural lands has yet to be awarded to farmers.

== Environmental and social issues ==
=== Deforestation ===
Some agricultural practices, including export crops and encroachment by small farmers, lead to deforestation. Deforestation may in turn affect water supply needed by farms.

==== Water supply and soil quality ====
Due to the loss of watershed areas, water supply and quality have decreased. Deforestation has also resulted in erosion and siltation, leading to worsened water quality.

Heavy use of chemical fertilizers have also led to declining soil quality.

=== Climate change ===
Agriculture is one of the Philippines' largest sectors and will continue to be adversely impacted by the effects of climate change. The agriculture sector employs 35% of the working population and generated 13% of the country's GDP in 2009. The two most important crops, rice and corn, account for 67% of the land under cultivation and stand to see reduced yields from heat and water stress. In addition to these challenges, the agricultural sector in the Philippines has also been significantly impacted by the drought conditions induced by El Niño. This phenomenon has led to considerable agricultural losses, estimated at about 4.4 billion pesos ($76.2 million). Nearly 78,000 hectares of agricultural land, predominantly used for rice cultivation, have been affected. Rice, wheat, and corn crops are expected to see a 10% decrease in yield for every 1 °C increase over a 30 °C average annual temperature.

Increases in extreme weather events will have devastating effects on agriculture. Typhoons (high winds) and heavy rainfall contribute to the destruction of crops, reduced soil fertility, altered agricultural productivity through severe flooding, increased runoff, and soil erosion. Droughts and reduced rainfall lead to increased pest infestations that damage crops as well as an increased need for irrigation. Rising sea levels increases salinity which leads to a loss of arable land and irrigation water.

All of these factors contribute to higher prices of food and an increased demand for imports, which hurt the general economy as well as individual livelihoods. From 2006 to 2013, the Philippines experienced a total of 75 disasters that cost the agricultural sector $3.8 billion in loss and damages. Typhoon Haiyan alone cost the Philippines' agricultural sector an estimated US$724 million after causing 1.1 million tonnes of crop loss and destroying 600,000 ha of farmland. The agricultural sector is expected to see an estimated annual GDP loss of 2.2% by 2100 due to climate impacts on agriculture. The Department of Agriculture says 500,000 to 600,000 metric tons in palay production is lost each year to heavy rain and flooding. In 2025, amid the need for funds for irrigation infrastructure, concerns were raised regarding corruption in the flood control projects scandal in the Philippines.

=== Farmer landlessness ===
Most Filipino farmers do not have their own land and landlessness among farmers is worsening. According to the Philippine Census of Agriculture and Fisheries in 2012 and 2022, 4.3 million farm workers (21.8%) own their agricultural land, while 15.2 million (78.2%) do not own their land.

Barriers to land ownership of farmers include the failure of various national land reform programs, land grabbing, which is often accompanied by threats and violence against farmers, and ownership by foreign corporations, such as Dole and Del Monte, which have controlled pineapple and banana plantations since the U.S colonial occupation.

Philippine peasant organizations mark the Global Day of the Landless on March 29.

=== Land conversion ===
Agricultural areas are being subjected to land conversion to make way for development projects, to the detriment of farmers' welfare and the country's food security. According to former Department of Agriculture secretary Florencio Abad, farmlands are also being converted for non-agricultural purposes, such as for housing subdivisions, shopping centers, golf courses or recreation camps, export processing zones, and mining exploration. Massive land use conversion occurring in the country harms the agricultural sector in general and has negative effects on food security and rice supply. It also leads to higher prices for basic commodities and worsens the country's dependence on agricultural imports.

=== Poverty among farmers ===
Farmers and fishers belong to the poorest sectors of Philippine society. The incidence of poverty among farmers was estimated at 31.6% in 2018 (compared to the 16.7% national poverty incidence), according to data from the Philippine Statistics Authority (PSA). Poverty incidence among farmers stood at 30% and fisherfolk at 30.6% in 2021, according to PSA data.

Low-skilled agricultural workers usually receive wages at rates following the regional daily minimum wage set by the government. These rates are close to the national poverty threshold.

The issue of low wages may be compounded by landlessness among farmers, as well as contractual and informal work arrangements that do not provide job security or continuing access to statutory benefits (such as health benefits and other social safety nets). Contractual and informal work arrangements also create barriers that prevent farmers from exercising their constitutional right to free association and collective bargaining, which in turn prevent workers from gaining higher pay and developing new skills.

=== Occupational hazards ===
Farmers in the Philippines are exposed to various occupational safety and health hazards. These include exposure to harmful pesticides and chemical fertilizers, physical injuries, and long work hours, according to the International Labour Organization.

=== Human rights ===
Farmers, fishers, land reform advocates, labor rights activists, and ancestral land defenders have been harassed or killed in the Philippines by state and non-state actors. During the 2021 commemoration of the Mendiola massacre, the Commission on Human Rights called for "an end to all killings and impunity in the country" and stressed "the need to protect the people's right to protest and express dissent, as well as to resist any move that would diminish or undermine the people's enjoyment of their rights". House Bill 1112 filed in Congress seeks to declare January 22 as National Farmer's Day.

==== Negros killings ====
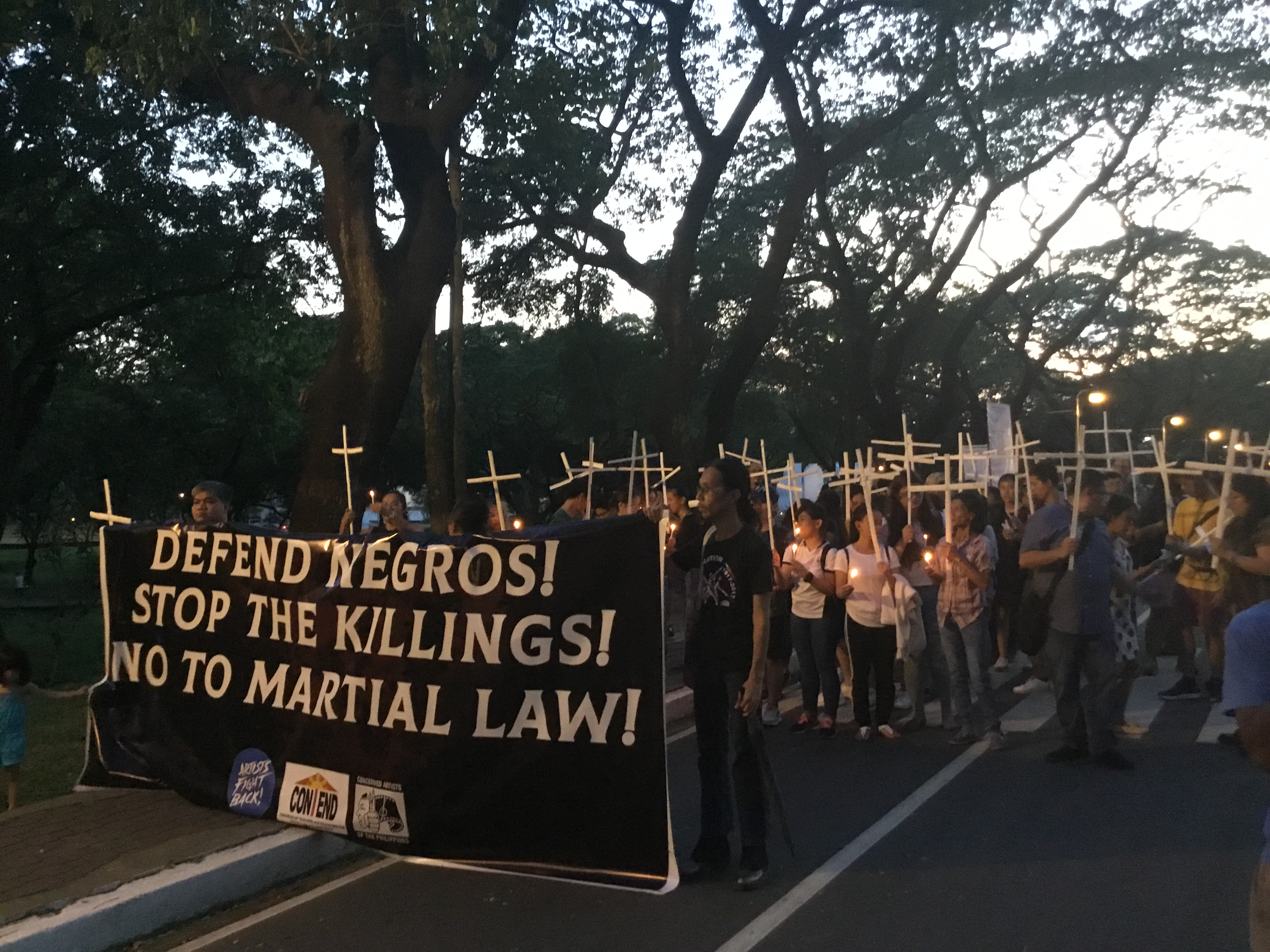
August 16, 2019 protest inside UP Diliman against Negros massacres.

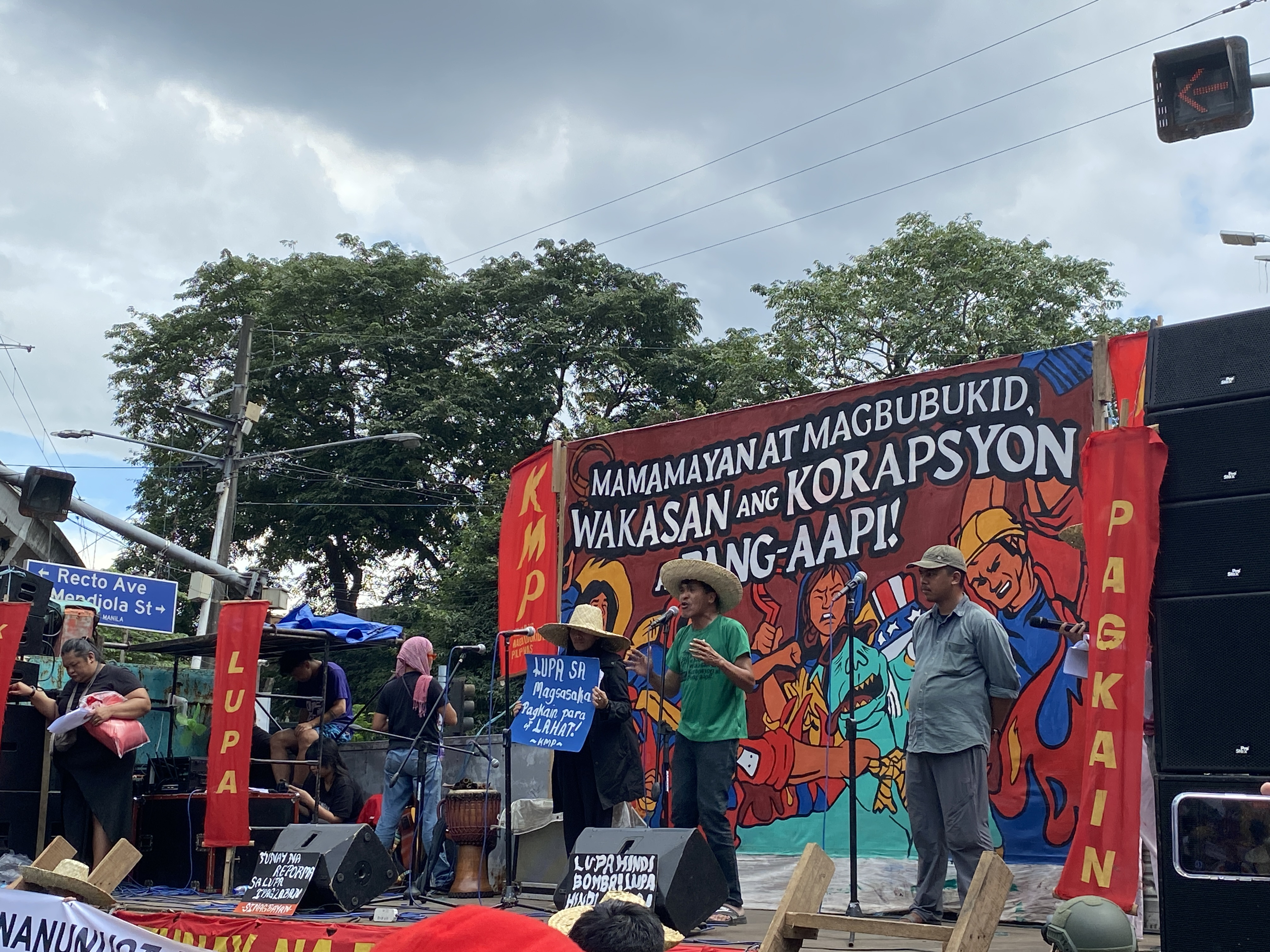
A peasant from Negros speaks in front of thousands at Mendiola denouncing continued killings and human rights violations in Negros, October 2025.

The Negros killings were a series of targeted assassinations carried out by unidentified gunmen in the provinces of Negros Oriental and Negros Occidental in the Philippines. Some of the victims involved were suspected communists or sympathizers. Following the killings, Memorandum Order No. 32 was signed by Executive Secretary Salvador Medialdea on November 23, 2018, upon the orders of President Rodrigo Duterte deploying additional troops to the provinces of Negros Oriental, Negros Occidental, Samar, and the Bicol Region to "suppress sporadic acts of violence" allegedly committed by lawless groups and to "prevent such violence from spreading and escalating elsewhere in the country." Even after the memorandum was signed, the incidence of killings continued. According to the Defend Negros Movement, the first recorded extrajudicial killing on Negros Island was Alexander Ceballos on January 20, 2017. The group also alleged that at least 84 persons have been killed since 2017.

Violence against farmers and land reform activists is common, according to Human Rights Watch, with landlessness blamed for mass poverty in the Philippines.

== See also ==
- Federation of Free Farmers
- Land Bank of the Philippines
