= Animal domestication and management in the Philippines =

Domesticated animals in the Philippines include pigs, chickens, water buffalo, goats, cats, and dogs. Domestication is when a species is selectively bred to produce certain traits that are seen as desirable. Some desirable traits include quicker growth and maturity, increased fertility, adaptability to various conditions, and living in herds. Domesticated animals play an important socioeconomic role in the Philippines, as seen through their widespread use in rituals.

== Pigs ==
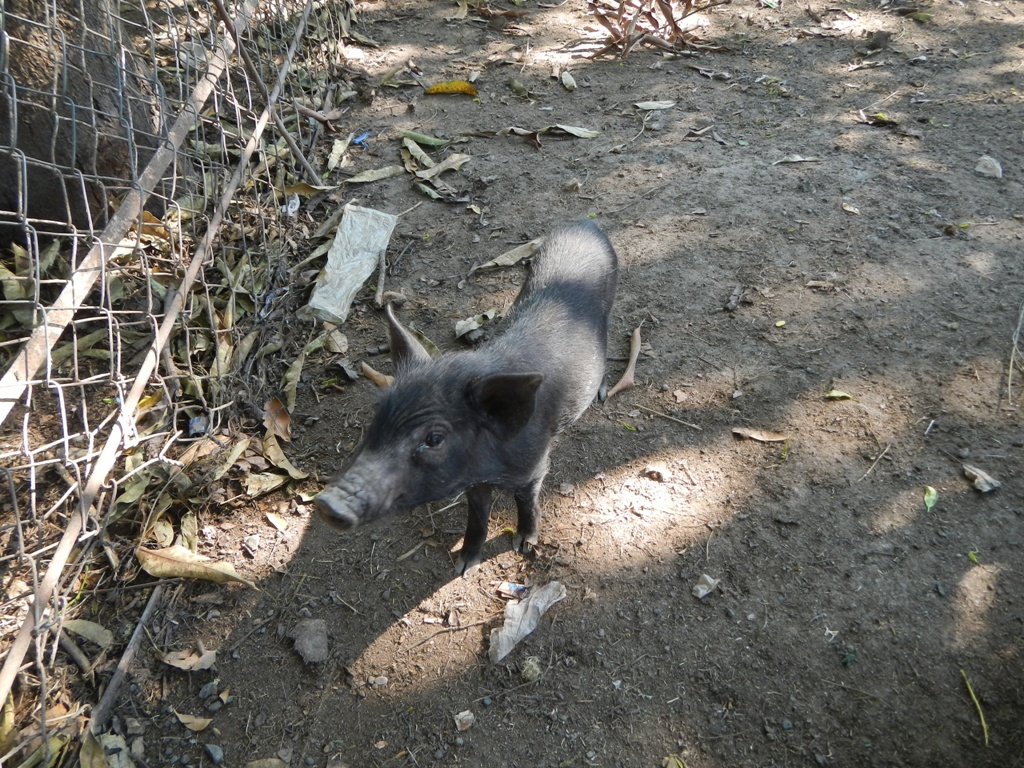
Sus scrofa

There is evidence for pigs in the Philippines during the Neolithic and Iron Age. Pig remains were found at the Nagsabaran site in Alaguia, Lal-lo town in Cagayan Province, Northern Luzon. Of the pig remains, two different taxa were found: Sus philippensis (also known as the Philippine warty pig) and an unknown species. The unknown species’ remains are similar to Sus Scrofa, which is a domesticated pig found in Luzon. Through morphometric examination of teeth, researchers concluded that the unknown species of pig was likely domesticated due to its larger size than the Philippine warty pig and its similarity to the domesticated species Sus scrofa. A carbon-14 date on a premolar of the unknown species dates domesticated pigs at ca. 2500-2200 cal BC. Faunal remains of predominantly wild pig were found at the Nagsabaran site, indicating that hunting was the primary subsistence strategy during the Neolithic and Iron Age and pigs were not domesticated for the sole purpose of subsistence.

In present-day villages located in Luzon and Palawan, domesticated pigs (Sus scrofa) are only eaten for ceremonial purposes, while wild pigs (Sus philippensis) are never used for rituals. In Borneo, indigenous groups use pigs for trade and social status. Throughout the Philippines, domesticated pigs are bred for socioeconomic reasons and are used for ceremonies, bride wealth, burials, and ritual feasting. Domesticated pigs show status and wealth and are used to make and strengthen alliances. They are also used as deity offerings.

== Goat ==
Goats were believed to be introduced into the Philippines as cargo from Islamic or early traders and established into domestic contexts by Spanish contact before the fifteenth century A.D. Goats had a variety of uses throughout the Philippines, some examples of places where goats were used include; Mindanao, Visayas, and Palawan. Goats were used as prestige gifts and were a part of ritual feasts in chiefly societies. There is evidence that goats were consumed in Moros, where as in the Visayas, humans did not eat goat or consume their milk products. After Spanish contact, there was an increase of use in goats for trade and food. In Mindanao, it was very common for goats to be used as trade.

== Dog ==
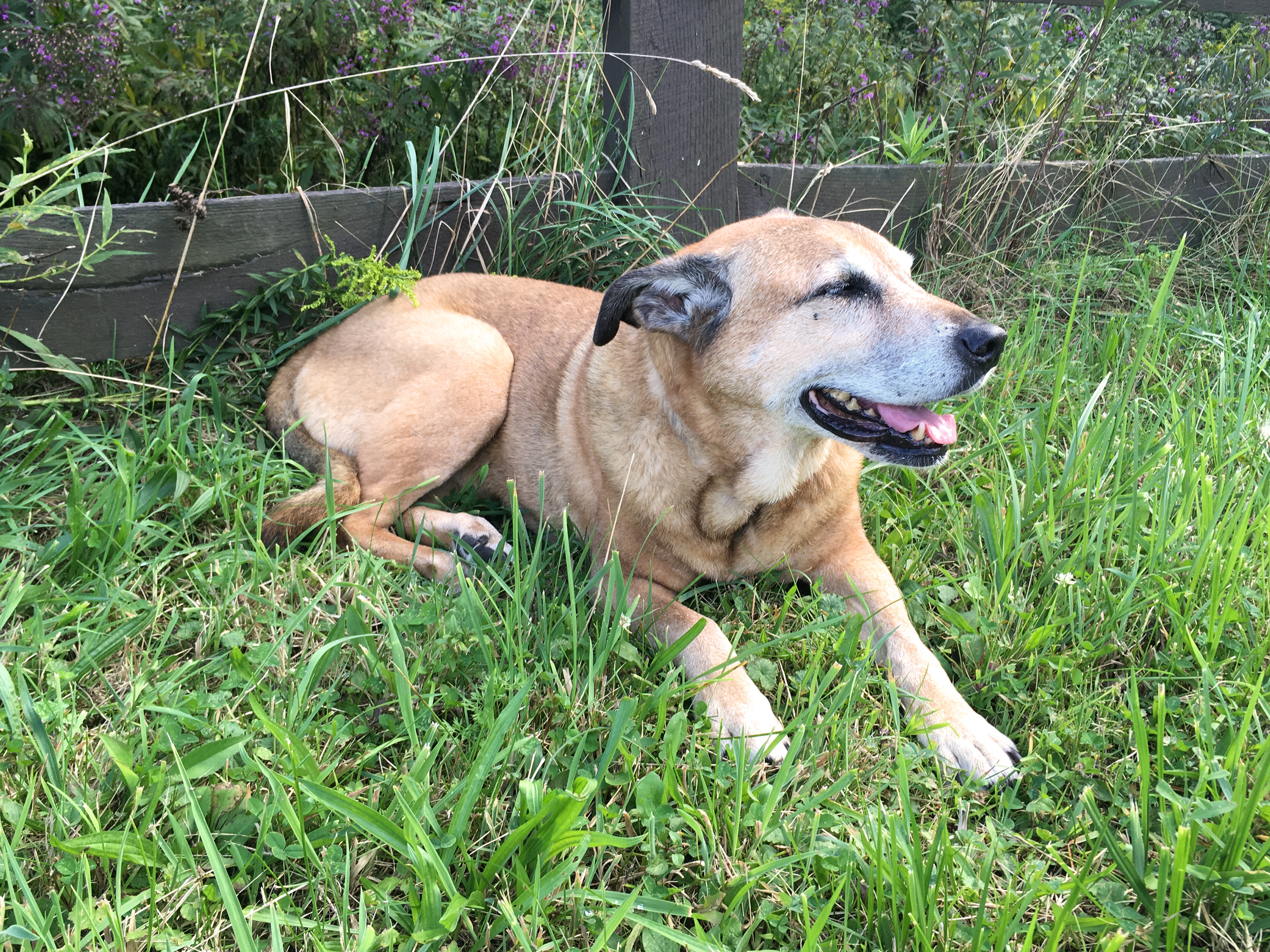
Canis familiaris

The first animal to be domesticated in the Philippines was the dog, Canis familiaris. The arrival of dogs in the Philippines were brought by some of the earliest colonists coming into the Philippine Archipelago. There have been a differential treatment of dogs within each community in the Philippines; some are free to roam around structures and villages, while in traditional contemporary societies, dogs are consumed. In Nagsabaran, a site in Cagayan, Northern Luzon Philippines, there is archaeological evidence for multiple uses of dog in Philippine societies. In one pit, found within the same stratigraphic area as humans, there is evidence of butchery due to the numerous cut marks on remains. In proper and deliberate dog burials, there is evidence of humans having an emotional tie or a special relation relationship to this animal because of their important use in the Philippine society. These dogs served as a utilitarian purpose and were used as a guard, for hunting, or for any other utilitarian purpose. In other cases, dogs were bred as consumption for funerals, marriages, or any other celebrations.

== Fish ==
Fish were an important in the Philippine economy and an important resource to rituals in prehispanic Philippine societies. The main sources of fish in the Philippines came from three major habitats; fresh water, marine inshore waters and marine offshore waters. For each of these waters:

- Fresh water: hook and line, traps, nets, or speared (mainly for the larger fish)
- Marine inshore waters: hook and line, netting, or spearing
- Marine offshore waters: caught using ancient fishing gear, a paddled or sailed dugout, fish corrals, spears, or hooks and lines

Some of the many fish that were caught include catfish, carp, snappers, mullets, sharks, rays, parrotfish, yellow fish tuna, and mackerel. In some villages, fishing was regulated and reserved for markets due to orders from chiefs. In the Boxer's Codex, it explains how some protective gear and helmets were made using fish skins. Fish were also used as a sacrifice during rituals that involved pig slaughtering. In Manila, there is evidence of Tagalogs having used fish as sacrifices to anito spirits.

== Deer ==
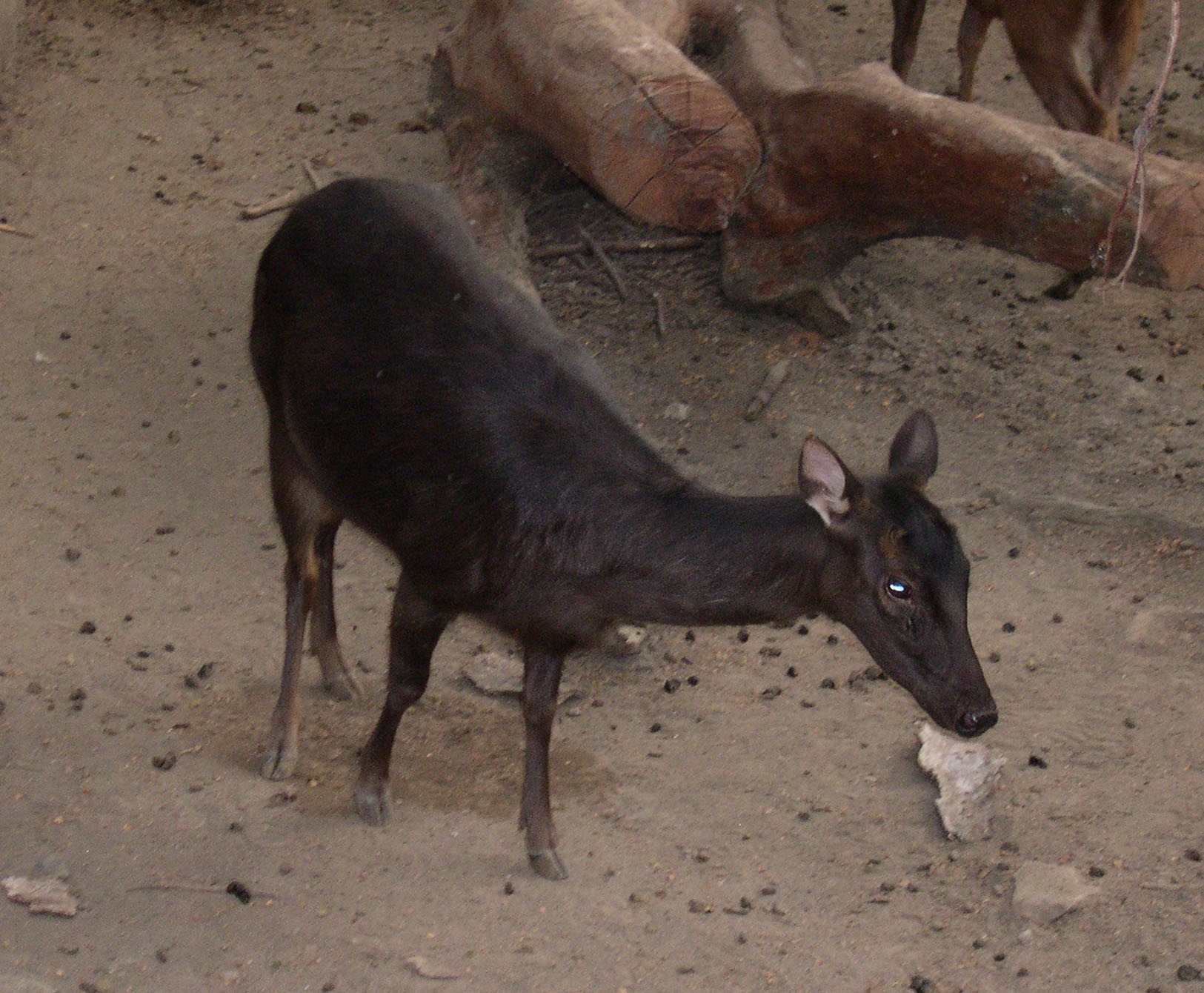
Cervus mariannus

One of the largest wild animals available for exploitation in the Philippines. In lowland populations, deer were not involved in trading, rituals, or feasting up until after the seventeenth century A.D. For example, deer skin was used as a trading product between the Japanese. In the Visayas, there is evidence of deer being eating during banquets and special occasions. In Nagsabaran, deer was the second most mammal faunal found on the site. The variety of teeth found indicates that deer of all ages were hunted on this site. Deer bones, mainly the lower limb portions, were used to manufacture tools using a groove and snap technique. Deer faunal assemblages were higher in lower populations because they tended to withdraw from populated environments.

== Water buffalo ==
One of the few animals the Austronesian speaking people brought with them on their journey to Southeast Asia. Water-buffalo is credited with the success of wet rice cultivation. Unlike cattle, their hooves allow them to move easily through soft rice field without sinking. The scientific name for a domestic water- buffalo is Bubalus bubalis. The two types of breeds for a domestic buffalo is swamp and river. River buffaloes have started replacing swamp buffaloes even though prehistorically swamp-type buffaloes can be seen in the early second millennia BC.

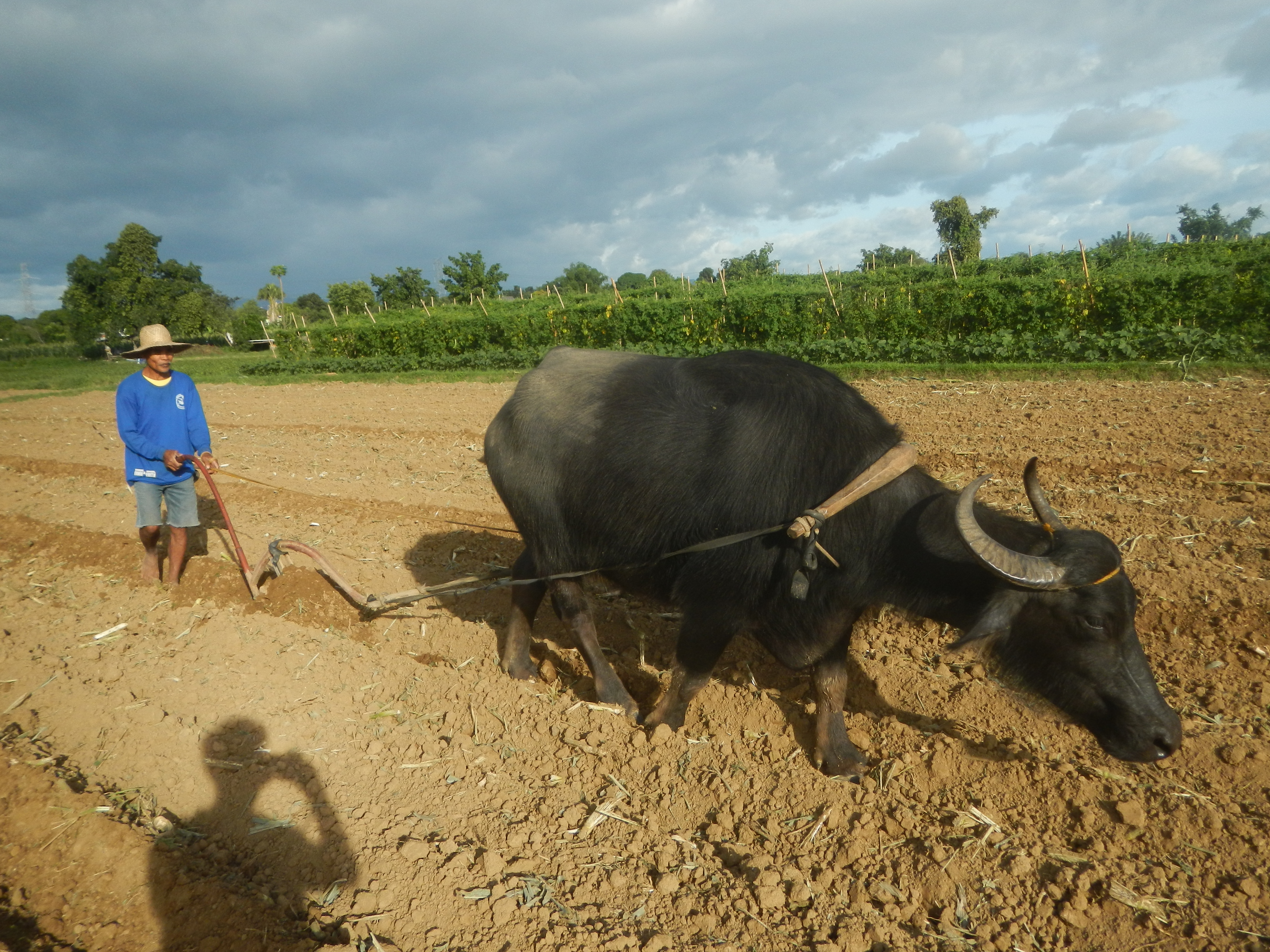
Carabao plowing in Philippines

Water buffalo, Bubalus bubalis, were identified at the Nagasbaran site dating to around 500 BC. This date was confirmed using radiocarbon dating of the oldest fragments found in the same layer. This contributes to Karen Mudar's theory that they were introduced to the Philippines in the late Neolithic. Their introduction long precedes the records of the species being introduced from China or Mexico during the 16th century. It is inferred that their intended use was agricultural and also social and economic. Analysis of recovered specimen, a pattern of butcher marks on adult buffalo revealed that they might have also been a source of food. Ethnographic studies conducted in the 1990s illuminated the importance of water buffaloes for agricultural purposes and as sacrifices in feasts.

=== Carabao ===
In the Philippines the swamp-type buffalo is referred to as carabao. In Tagalog kalabaw is another name for carabao, a name taken from Malay. They were also known as nowang or anowang in Luzon

== Chicken ==
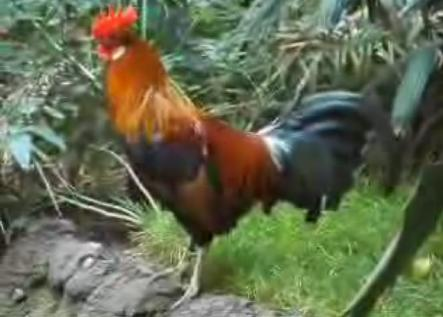
Red Junglefowl

At Nagasbaran site no domestic chicken (Gallus gallus) were found. They are deemed to be a rare occurrence in the Neolithic and Metal Age records. However, their introduction route to Oceania is still unknown. As more studies are conducted starting to realize the origins of domestic chickens can be seen everywhere. If chickens are seen it is most likely that they hold an economic importance, as well as being used in cockfights.

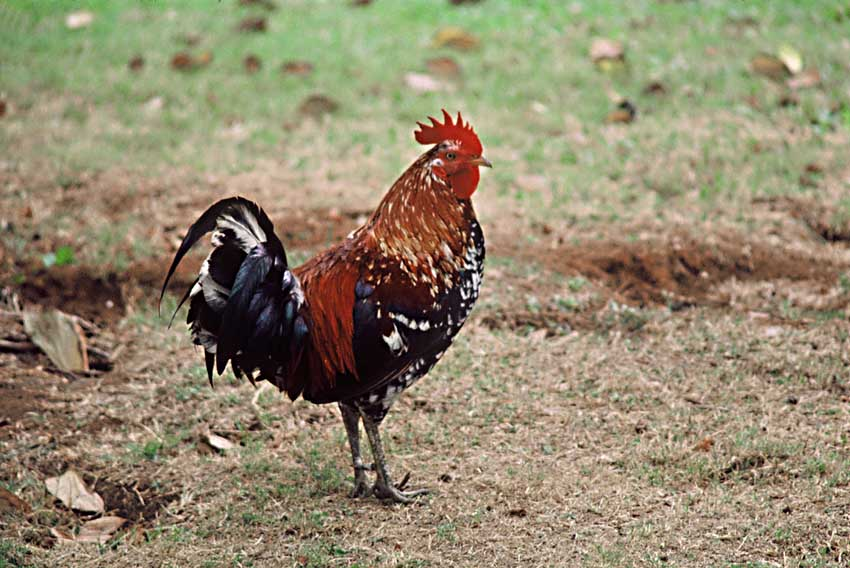
Gallus gallus

One of the animals that traveled with the Austronesian speaking people from Island Southeast Asia to Oceania. Not much emphasis on research to understand how domestic chicken got to Island Southeast Asia In the gallus genus the species Gallus gallus, red junglefowl or chicken can be found in the Philippines. Around 5,000 years ago the red junglefowl was domesticated and created a subspecies Gallus gallus domesticus, also known as chicken. They relationship to humans is as a food source. Unlike the domesticated red junglefowl the undomesticated red junglefowl is also a food source, but sometimes used in cock-fighting.

== Cats ==
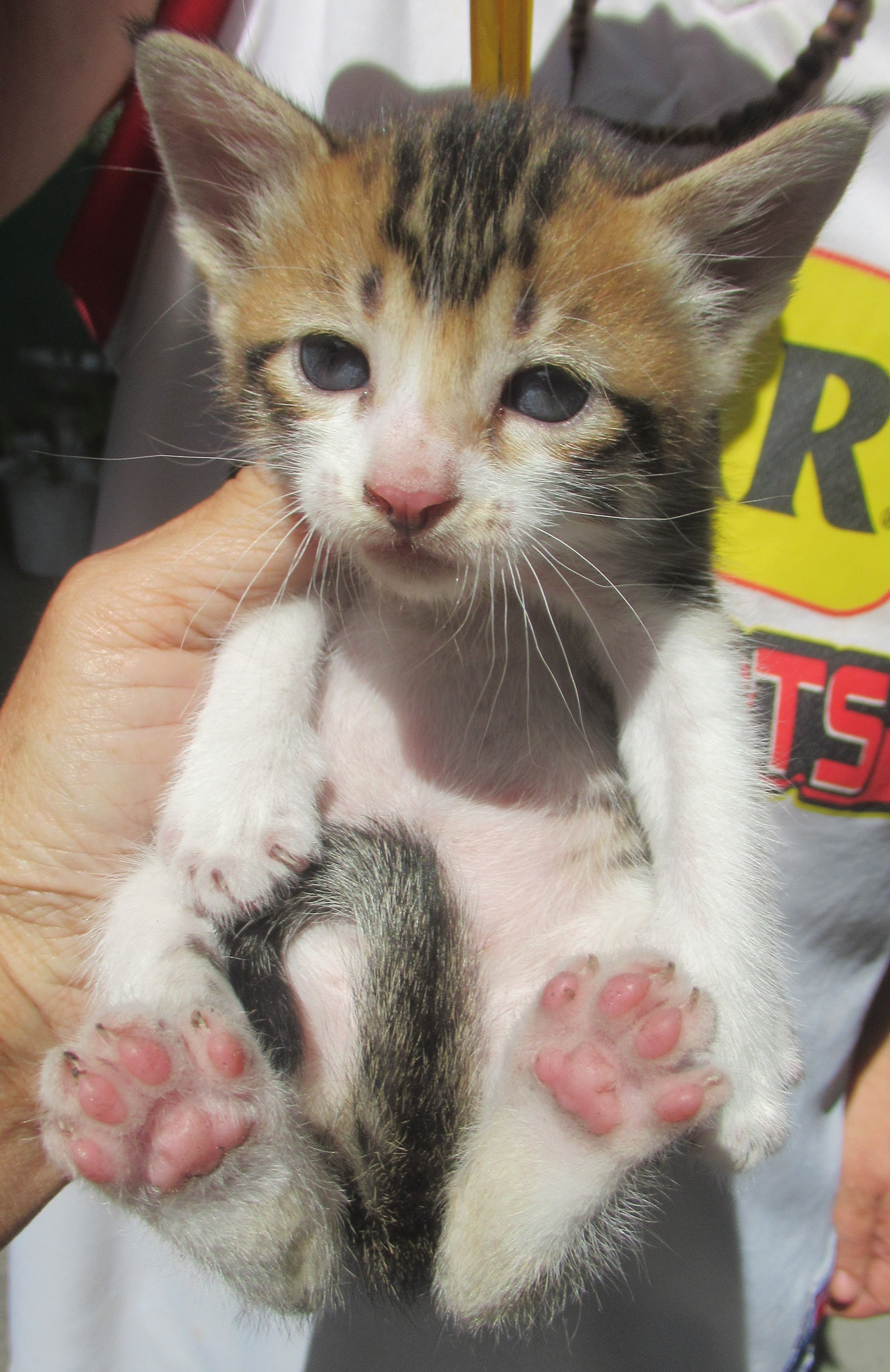
"Kuting na gala"

Scientific name for a domestic cat is, Felis domesticus. It is noted that the domestic cat was present in the Philippines by the time of the Spanish contact. How the cats were introduced to the Philippines is unknown. It is hypothesized that their introduction was a result of trading between the Greeks, Romans, and India. In which led to the domestic cat introduction in Southeast Asia after 1000 A.D. It is noted in Neil Todd's article, Cats and Commerce, that cats were great companions for ship owners. In which they would accompany them on long voyages, resulting in cats being introduced all over the world.

In Antonio Pigafetta's journals from the Magellan trade voyages, he noted seeing cats in Visayas. He does not mention them being used in trade or for ceremonial use. However, in Philippine societies, it is possible that cats had part in subsistence and the local economy.

While cats in the Philippines did not feature prominently in the same ritual or trade contexts as some other animals, their presence suggests they may have functioned as rodent‐controllers (especially on ships or in storage areas) and as domestic companions. Over time, they became part of the domestic animal landscape alongside pigs, chickens and dogs.

In many Philippine languages, the word for kitten is “kuting”, likely borrowed from Malay/Indonesian linguistic traditions. Evidence suggests that the concept of cats may have been introduced rather than indigenous to Austronesian domestic animal systems.

COMMUNITY CAT CARE

Over recent decades, attention has turned to how communities in the Philippines and worldwide manage free-roaming cats (sometimes called community cats) in a humane and practical way. A community cat is a cat that does not have a specific individual owner, but is looked after (fed, monitored, sometimes sterilised) by community members.

Community cat care initiatives typically aim to:

- Spay/neuter (sterilize) the cats so that new litters are minimised (often called Trap-Neuter-Return or “TNR” in some jurisdictions).
- Provide managed feeding (scheduled, monitored, and in designated spots) so the cats remain in one area and do not become a nuisance by roaming or scavenging wildly. The Philippine Animal Welfare Society
- Ensure vaccination and basic veterinary care, particularly against rabies or other zoonotic risks. For example, the Philippine Animal Welfare Society (PAWS) promotes this approach in the Philippines.
- Work with local communities, property managers, animal welfare organisations and volunteers to set up feeding stations, monitor cat health, and track cats that have been sterilised.

=== Philippine case-studies ===
- At Eton Centris (a mixed-use development in Metro Manila), volunteers made a group to feed stray cats, implemented a TNVR (“Trap-Neuter-Vaccinate-Return”) program, monitored individual cats by name, and sought adoption when possible.
- The organisation Cats of BGC (in Bonifacio Global City, Taguig) is a volunteer-led group that feeds, vaccinates and neuters community cats in the area.

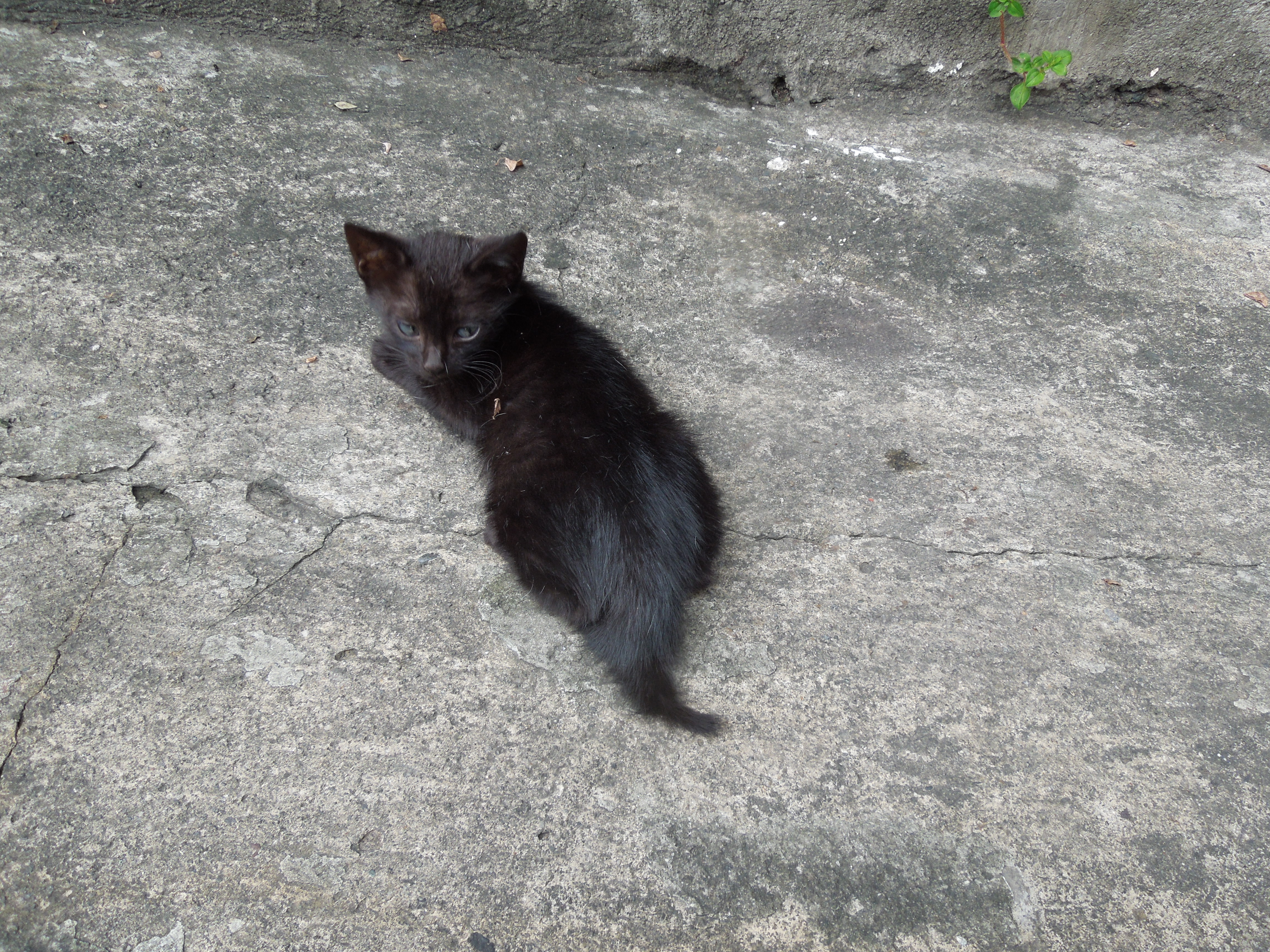
Felis domesticus
