= Cavan (unit) =

Cavan, sometimes spelled Caban or Kaban (Note: Before the 28-letter Filipino alphabet was defined in the 1987 Constitution, the Tagalog alphabet had only 20 letters that did not include a V and a C.)) is a Filipino unit of mass and also a unit of volume or dry measure.

== Description ==
Cavan was defined in the 19th century by the government of the Spanish East Indies as being equivalent to 75 litres. Though officially the Philippines became entirely metric in 1860, this value was still in use well into the 20th century.

Cavan was reported in the late 19th century as a measure for rice equivalent to 98.28 litres. Various references from the same period describe it as a unit of mass: for rice, 133 lb (about 60.33 kg); for cocoa, 83.5 lb, (about 37.87 kg) one source says on the average 60 kg for rice and 38 kg for cacao). Other sources claim it was the equivalent of 58.2 kg.

In all likelihood, this is a case in which some commodities began to be traded by weight instead of volume, and a “caban of rice” became a certain mass rather than a certain volume. One source states that before 1973 a cavan of any type of rice weighed 50 kg. One source says that after 1973 a cavan of rough rice weighed 44 kg and a cavan of milled rice weighed 56 kg (the significance of the 1973 date is unclear).

Usage example: "At present, owing to the late scarcity of rice in Camarines and Leyte, the price of paddy at Iloilo has risen to 10 rials per province cavan, which is equal to one and a half of the measure (cavan del rey) used at Manila."

The term "cavan" (defined as 50kg) was still being used in the Philippines in 2022 but in the food markets one caban of rice refers to one bag full of rice with the bag size gradually being reduced over the years.
