= Federation of Free Farmers =

Filipino agricultural association

- Headquarters: Quezon City
- Affiliations: Trade Union Congress of the Philippines

The Federation of Free Farmers (FFF) is an agricultural association in the Philippines.

== History ==
The organization was founded on October 25, 1953, in Porac, Pampanga by Catholics with Christian democratic leanings, following the decline of communism in the Philippines. Its early recruitment efforts did not meet with substantial success.

One of its founding members, Jeremias Montemayor, a lawyer, developed an early plan for an agricultural cooperative organization called "Plows and Peace" which later developed into a plan for the organization. Fernando Esguerra was another influential figure in FFF's early history.

According to Roth, FFF was instrumental in passing a 1971 statute revising the government's approach to land reform. In October 1971, 500 farmers affiliated with FFF occupied land allocated Central Mindanao University.

Silliman argues that, as of 1980, FFF—unusually among agrarian organizations under the Marcos regime—was affiliated with the state.

FFF was a member organization of the International Federation of Agricultural Producers (IFAP) before IFAP's dissolution in 2010.

== Positions ==
Crater argues that the basic aim of FFF in its early years was to ensure that every peasant farmer was "the owner of a family-size farm". Overholt suggests that FFF, as of the 1970s, was against "absentee landlords".

Borras argues that FFF underwent a number of ideological transformations in the 1960s and 1970s. In his view, FFF was founded with "conservative" leanings, became briefly "radicalized" in the 1960s, and then, following the exit of the radical faction in the 1970s, returned to its ideological roots.

== Sources ==
- Crater, Sonya Marie (May 1959). The Philippine Federation of Free Farmers: A Case Study in Mass Agrarian Organizations (PDF). Ithaca, New York: Cornell University.
- Overholt, William H. (May 1976). "Land Reform in the Philippines". Asian Survey. 16 (5): 427–451. doi:10.2307/2643192. ISSN 0004-4687. JSTOR 2643192.
