= Writ of Kalikasan =

Legal remedy protecting right to a healthy environment in the Philippines

A Writ of Kalikasan is a legal remedy under Philippine law that provides protection of one's constitutional right to a healthy environment, as outlined in Section 16, Article II of the Philippine Constitution, which states that the "state shall protect and advance the right of the people to a balanced and healthful ecology in accord with the rhythm and harmony of nature." Kalikasan is a Filipino word for "nature".

The writ is comparable to the writ of amparo and the writ of habeas corpus. In contrast, this writ protects one's right for a healthy environment rather than constitutional rights. The Writ of Kalikasan originated in the Philippines, whereas the two aforementioned writs have roots in European and Latin American law.

== History ==
Provision for the Writ of Kalikasan was written in 2010 by the Supreme Court of the Philippines under Rule 7 of the Rules of Procedure for Environmental Cases as a Special Civil Action. The Supreme Court under Chief Justice Reynato Puno took the initiative and issued Rules of Procedure for Environmental Cases because Section 16, Article II of the Philippines' 1986 Constitution was not a self-executing provision.

== Cases ==
The Writ of Kalikasan may be sought to deal with environmental damage of such magnitude that it threatens life, health, or property of inhabitants in two or more cities or provinces.

In 2013, the Court of Appeals upheld a court ruling banning field trials of Bt eggplant in the Philippines. The ruling stated that the field trials violated people's right to a balanced ecology.

In September 2014, the Supreme Court of the Philippines ruled unanimously against issuing a Writ of Kalikasan against the United States Government over the grounding of the USS Guardian on the Tubbataha Reef in 2013.

In April 2023, the Supreme Court issued a Writ of Kalikasan ordering the Department of Agriculture and the Department of Environment and Natural Resources (DENR) to stop the sale of genetically modified golden rice and Bt eggplant in the Philippines.

In June 2023, The Supreme Court issued a Writ of Kalikasan against the DENR, the Mines and Geosciences Bureau, and Altai Philippines Mining Corporation, in response to a petition by residents seeking to protect the Sibuyan Island ecosystem and local livelihoods.

In August 2023, the Supreme Court issued a Writ of Kalikasan against Celestial Nickel Mining and Exploration Corporation, Ipilan Nickel Corporation, and the DENR. The court ruled that mining operations on the Mount Mantalingahan mountain range in Palawan may cause irreparable environmental damage to the Mount Mantalingahan protected area and the Indigenous Cultural Communities' ancestral domain.

In April 2024 the Court of Appeals upheld a Writ of Kalikasan against the production of and commercial activity regarding golden rice by the Philippine Rice Research Institute. This case was brought by Greenpeace as golden rice is genetically modified to have increased vitamin A.

== See also ==
- Environmental issues in the Philippines
