= Jaime Tadeo =

Filipino activist (1938–2023)

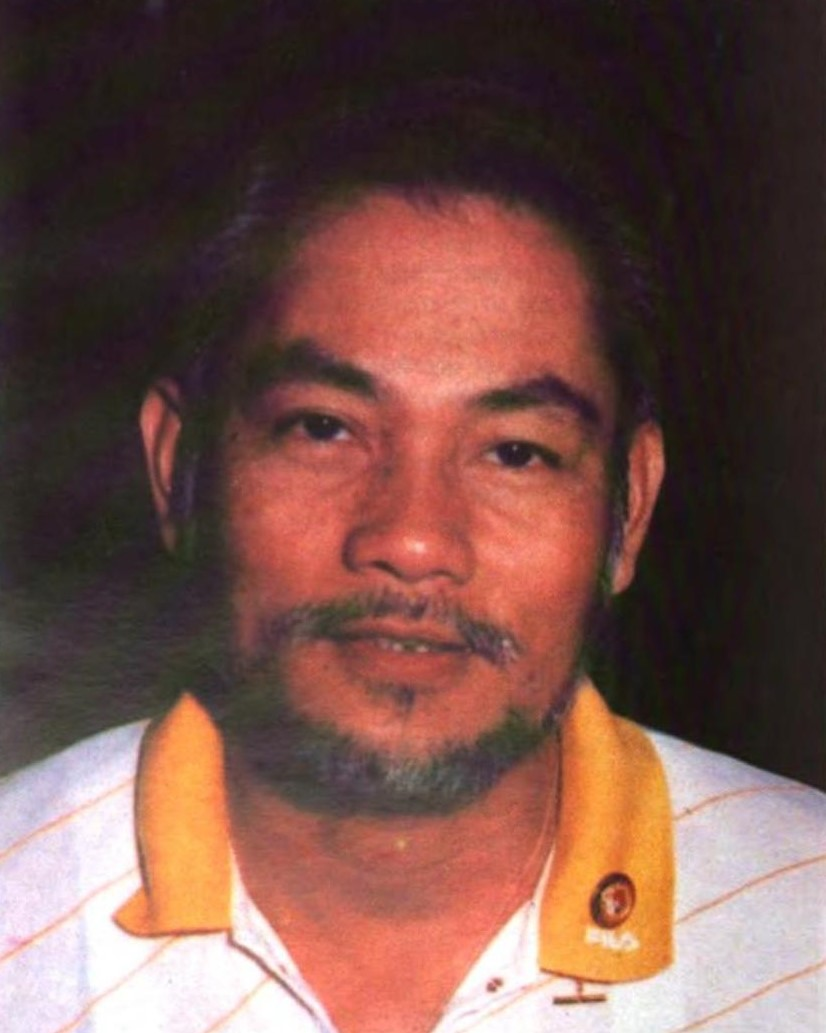
- Tadeo from the Official Directory of the Constitutional Commission, c. 1986

Chairperson of the Kilusang Magbubukid ng Pilipinas
- In office July 24, 1985 – October 22, 1993
- Preceded by: Position established
- Succeeded by: Rafael V. Mariano

Member of the Philippine Constitutional Commission
- In office June 2, 1986 – October 15, 1986
- President: Corazon Aquino

Personal details
- Born: March 28, 1938 Bocaue, Bulacan, Commonwealth of the Philippines
- Died: March 26, 2023 (aged 84)
- Party: Partido ng Bayan (1987)
- Spouse: Cresencia Bernardino
- Children: 5
- Occupation: Activist
- Profession: Farmer
- Nickname: Ka Jimmy

Jaime "Ka Jimmy" San Luis Tadeo (March 28, 1938 – March 26, 2023) was a Filipino peasant activist and organic farmer.

== Biography ==
Tadeo was born in Bocaue, Bulacan. He obtained a bachelor's degree in Agriculture from Araneta University in 1960 and worked in various government agencies from 1962 to 1981. Tadeo has been characterized as a "deeply religious man", having served as a sacristan prior to his political activities.

Tadeo was the first chairman of the militant Kilusang Magbubukid ng Pilipinas (KMP; lit. 'Peasant Movement of the Philippines'), formed some months before the 1986 People Power Revolution in order to push for agrarian reform. Shortly after the fall of the Marcos dictatorship, Tadeo was appointed to be part of the 1986 Constitutional Commission where he was the sole peasant representative.

In January 1987, Tadeo figured prominently in the demonstrations which led to the Mendiola massacre, a violent dispersal of peasants, workers, and students by state security forces which left 13 dead. According to Tadeo, most of the 13 were part of a "composite team" purposely put to protect him from gunfire.

On May 10, 1990, Tadeo was arrested and sentenced to a maximum of 18 years in prison at the National Penitentiary in Muntinlupa for committing estafa, which supporters claim was due to his outspoken criticism of Corazon Aquino's executive order on agrarian reform. Asked about his views on the president, he remarked that she "[was] running the country like her own hacienda," and retorted "I asked Cory Aquino for land for the peasants and she gave me 'Muntinlupa' (in Tagalog, 'tiny piece of land')." A few days after his arrest, Tadeo was unanimously reelected as KMP chairman at the group's Third National Congress, with vice chairman Rafael V. Mariano serving as acting chairman during his imprisonment. Tadeo's sentence was commuted after three years, and he was released on parole on August 6, 1993 after submitting a release application to the Department of Justice's Board of Pardons and Parole. President Fidel V. Ramos stated that Tadeo's release could benefit the national peace and reconciliation program under his administration.

In July 1993, a month prior to his release on parole, Tadeo was accused by KMP vice chairman Mariano of committing estafa, with him being impeached from his chairmanship position by October 1993. Tadeo's ouster as KMP chairman occurred during the height of ideological disagreements within the national democratic movement. As a result, Tadeo and several other peasant activists split from the KMP to form the Demokratikong Kilusang Magbubukid ng Pilipinas (DKMP), a labor organization not aligned with the Communist Party of the Philippines, in December 1993.

In his later years, Tadeo led Paragos-Pilipinas, a small group of Bulakenyo and Central Luzon farmers. He supported the Genuine Agrarian Reform Bill (GARB) filed in Congress by Rep. Rafael Mariano, a former KMP colleague, in 2018.

== Death and legacy ==
Tadeo died on March 26, 2023, two days before his 85th birthday.

Scholar James Putzel took the title of his 1992 book, A Captive Land: The Politics of Agrarian Reform in the Philippines on the history of land reform in the Philippines and the United States' role in it, from Tadeo's remark that the Philippines is a "foreign dominated economy," captive to American interests.
