= Tax Reform for Acceleration and Inclusion Law =

Philippine tax reform law

Congress of the Philippines
- Long title: An Act amending Sections 4, 5, 6, 24, 25, 27, 31, 32, 33, 34, 51, 52, 56, 57, 58, 74, 79, 84, 86, 90, 91, 97, 99, 100, 101, 106, 107, 108, 109, 110, 112, 114, 116, 127, 128, 129, 145, 148, 149, 151, 155, 171, 174, 175, 177, 178, 179, 180, 181, 182, 183, 186, 188, 189, 190, 191, 192, 193, 194, 195, 196, 197, 232, 236, 237, 249, 254, 264, 269, and 288; creating new Sections 51-A, 148-A, 150-A, 150-B, 237-A, 264-A, 264-B, and 265-A; and repealing Sections 35, 62, and 89; all under Republic Act No. 8424, otherwise known as the National Internal Revenue Code of 1997, as amended, and for other purposes
- Citation: Republic Act No. 10963
- Territorial extent: Philippines
- Enacted by: House of Representatives
- Enacted: December 14, 2017
- Enacted by: Senate
- Enacted: December 13, 2017
- Commenced: January 1, 2018

Legislative history

Initiating chamber: House of Representatives
- Bill title: House Bill No. 5636
- Introduced by: Dakila Cua
- Introduced: May 15, 2017
- First reading: May 15, 2017
- Second reading: May 31, 2017
- Third reading: May 31, 2017
- Committee report: Committee Report No. 229

Revising chamber: Senate
- Bill title: Senate Bill No. 1592
- Received from the House of Representatives: September 20, 2017
- Member(s) in charge: Aquilino Pimentel III
- First reading: September 20, 2017
- Second reading: November 28, 2017
- Third reading: November 28, 2017
- Committee report: Committee Report No. 164
- Status: In force

The Tax Reform for Acceleration and Inclusion Law (TRAIN Law), officially designated as Republic Act No. 10963 of the Philippines, is the initial package of the Comprehensive Tax Reform Program (CTRP) signed into law by former President Rodrigo Duterte on December 19, 2017.

The TRAIN Act is the first of four packages of tax reforms to the National Internal Revenue Code of 1997, or the Tax Code, as amended. This package introduced changes in personal income tax (PIT), estate tax, donor's tax, value added tax (VAT), documentary stamp tax (DST) and the excise tax of tobacco products, petroleum products, mineral products, automobiles, sweetened beverages, and cosmetic procedures.

The prominent features of the tax reform are lower personal income tax and higher consumption tax. Individual taxpayers with taxable income not exceeding ₱250,000 annually are exempted from income tax. The exemption for minimum wage earners is retained in the revised tax system.

Tax rates for individual taxpayers still follow the progressive tax system with the maximum rate of 35%, and minimum rates of 20% (taxable years 2018 to 2022) and 15% (2023 onwards). On the other hand, consumption taxes, in the form of higher excise tax on tobacco products, petroleum products, automobiles, tobacco, and additional excise tax on sweetened beverages and non-essential, invasive cosmetic procedures were introduced. It also expanded the VAT base by repealing exemption provisions in numerous special laws.

The TRAIN Act is aimed to generate revenue to achieve the 2022 and 2040 vision of the Duterte administration, namely, to eradicate extreme poverty, to create inclusive institutions that will offer equal opportunities to all, and to achieve higher income country status.

It is also aimed at making the tax system simpler, fairer and more efficient. Regardless, contentions about the passing of this law has been present since the beginning and the subsequent reception by the people since its ratification has been controversial. In the first quarter of 2018, both positive and negative outcomes have been observed.

The economy saw an increase in tax revenues, government expenditure and an incremental growth in GDP. On the other hand, unprecedented inflation rates that exceeded projected calculations, has been the cause for much uproar and objections. There have been petitions to suspend and amend the law, so as to safeguard particular sectors from soaring prices.

== Legislative history ==
=== House of Representatives ===
House Bill No. 4774 is credited as the original measure that led to the TRAIN Act. It was endorsed by the Department of Finance (DOF) to the Philippine House of Representatives on September 26, 2016, as the first package of a wider CTRP. It was filed before the legislature on January 17, 2017, by Congressman Dakila Cua of Quirino. Cua is also the chairperson of the Ways and Means Committee of the Congress which deals on taxation.

After thirteen hearings which was done within the span of four months, the House Bill No. 7890 was consolidated with 54 other tax-related bills to come up with a House Bill 5636, a substitute bill which had "moderate" changes from House Bill 4774. The substitute measure was approved on May 8.

The DOF requested President Rodrigo Duterte to declare the bill as "urgent" on May 29, 2017. Bills passed on the second reading by the Congress but are not certified "urgent" by the president could only be voted upon after copies of the given measure is provided to House of Representatives members three days before the day of the third and final reading. On May 31, 2017, just before the 17th Congress adjourn its first regular session, the bill passed the final reading with 246 voting for and 9 against the bill. Only one made an abstention. Most of those who opposed were from the Makabayan bloc.

=== Senate ===
A version of the bill was filed in the Senate in March 2017 by Senate President Aquilino Pimentel III. By May 2017 six public hearings were conducted by the senate. The Senate had to wait for the House of Representatives version to get passed before it could start plenary discussions like other bills on budget or tax and appropriations. The Senate voted 17–1 to approve the Tax Reform Acceleration and Inclusion (TRAIN) bill, with Sen. Risa Hontiveros being the lone dissenter on November 28, 2017. On the succeeding voting for the TRAIN, the positive votes were cast by Senators Sonny Angara, Nancy Binay, Frank Drilon, JV Ejercito, Chiz Escudero, Win Gatchalian, Dick Gordon, Gringo Honasan, Loren Legarda, Joel Villanueva, Koko Pimentel, Grace Poe, Ralph Recto, Tito Sotto, Cynthia Villar and Migs Zubiri. The negative votes were cast by Senators Ping Lacson, Risa Hontiveros, Bam Aquino and Antonio Trillanes IV

Duterte's certification of the TRAIN as "urgent" allowed the bill to get passed the second reading on November 28, 2017. Within the same day, the Senate bill passed the third and final reading with 17 senators voting for the bill. Only Risa Hontiveros voted against the bill.

=== Bicameral Conference Committee ===
The Bicameral Conference Committee consolidated the bills passed by the House of Representatives and the Senate. The committee then approved a bill which favored the Senate version on December 11, 2017, and prepared a report after for ratification of both chambers of the Congress and signing of the President.

the House of Representatives and the Senate ratified the version of the bill prepared by the Bicameral Conference Committee on December 13, 2017.

=== Signing into law and partial veto ===
President Duterte exercised his veto power to void 5 provisions of the law. The provisions vetoed were the following:

1. Reduced income tax rate of employees of Regional Headquarters (RHQs), Regional Operating Headquarters (ROHQs), Offshore Banking Units (OBUs), and Petroleum Service Contractors and Subcontractors;
2. Zero-rating of sales of goods and services to separate customs territory and tourism enterprise zones;
3. Exemption from percentage tax of gross sales/receipts not exceeding five hundred thousand pesos (₱500,000.00);
4. Exemption of various petroleum products from excise tax when used as input, feedstock, or as raw material in the manufacturing of petrochemical products, or in the refining of petroleum products, or as replacement fuel for natural gas fired combined cycle power plants; and
5. Earmarking of incremental tobacco taxes.

=== Summary of amendments ===
These were the revisions made to the Tax Code:

Amended Sections	5, 6, 24, 25, 27, 31, 32, 33, 34, 51, 52, 56, 57, 58, 74, 79, 84, 86, 90, 91, 97, 99, 100, 101, 106, 107, 108, 109, 110, 112, 114, 116, 127, 128, 129, 145, 148, 149, 151, 155, 171, 174, 175, 177, 178, 179, 180, 181, 182, 183, 186, 188, 189, 190, 191, 192, 193, 194, 195, 196, 197, 232, 236, 237, 249, 254, 264, 269, and 288
Created Sections	51-A, 148-A, 150-A, 150-B, 237-A, 264-A, 264-B, and 265-A
Repealed Sections	35, 62, and 89

=== Proposed repeal ===
In May 2018, following reports on how TRAIN-related price hikes had affected the poor, Rep. Carlos Zarate filed House Bill 7653 seeking to repeal some provisions of the TRAIN law. The bill sought to remove, among other things, the VAT on electricity and low-cost housing.

In May 2019, human rights lawyer Chel Diokno and former deputy speaker Erin Tañada joined labor day protesters to call for the repeal of the TRAIN law, amendments to the Labor Code of the Philippines, and ending endo contractualization.

== Complementary measures ==
There are four complementary measures undertaken to ensure the income from the TRAIN Law will be properly allocated for the development of the Philippines as a nation. These are the Tax Administration, Ear Making, Infrastructure Projects, and Social Programs.

=== Tax administration ===
Steps to modernize and refine the tax administration processes are undertaken to support the changes in tax policy so as to improve security against tax crimes and to ensure taxpayer compliance. On top of improving electronic systems (e.g. eBIR forms, Electronic Filing and Payment System, mobile payments) the following reforms are implemented:

- Mandatory fuel marking
- Provision for use of electronic receipts
- Connection of cash registers and point of sale machines to BIR servers for real time reporting of sales and purchase data
- Relaxation of bank secrecy laws and automatic exchange of information to allow for more effective prosecution of criminal cases

=== Ear marking ===
For 5 years from the law's enactment, all revenues will be set aside for infrastructure and social programs only, with a 70% and 30% portion respectively.

==== Infrastructure projects ====
Infrastructure projects that will receive priority funding include the Build, Build, Build Program that tackles the problem of congestion through the construction of public transport systems and road networks and the refurbishing and enhancing of military facilities. Additionally, part of the 70% will be allocated to the building of sports facilities in public schools as well as amenities that will allow access to potable water in public spaces.

==== Social programs ====
The social programs that will receive priority funding from 30% of revenues include:

- Programs for sugar farmers to increase productivity, provide livelihood opportunities, develop alternative farming systems, and enhance farmer's income
- Social mitigating measures and investments in education, health, social protection, employment, and housing for poor and near-poor households
- Unconditional cash transfer to the poorest 10 million households
- Social benefits card to determine qualified beneficiaries (fuel vouchers for PUJs, fare discount for all public utility vehicles, discounted purchase of NFA rice, free skills training under TESDA)

=== Unconditional cash transfers (UCT) ===
In order to provide provisional protection for vulnerable households from the initial shock of the TRAIN Law, unconditional cash transfers are dispensed. On the first year, beneficiaries receive ₱200 per month. In the succeeding 2 years, they receive ₱300 per month. The UCT is obtained from oil excise tax revenues. In addition to the UCT, social welfare cards are provided to aid in continuous conferring of benefits and subsidies to the poorest households. This includes subsidies for "medicine, transportation, rice, and vocational trainings".

== Key provisions ==
=== Package One ===
The overarching goal of the first package of the TRAIN is to "create a simpler, fair, and more efficient system". Through this program, the richer tax payers of the Philippines will pay a greater contribution to enable the government to execute its programs and services targeted to the general improvement of the country, especially the less fortunate. There are six main key provisions, three additional excise taxes, and four financial taxes.

==== Income tax ====
"The TRAIN lowers the Personal Income Tax (PIT) for all taxpayers except the rich". Effectively, personal taxes will be reduced for 99% of the Philippine tax payers.

The new PIT is summarized in the table below

Annuable Income Tax	Tax Rate	Percent of Taxpayers
₱0–250,000	0%	83%
Over ₱250,000–400,000	20% of the excess over ₱250,000	8%
Over ₱400,000–800,000	₱22,500 + 20% of the excess over ₱400,000	6%
Over ₱800,000–2,000,000	₱102,500 + 25% of the excess over ₱800,000	2%
Over ₱2,000,000–8,000,000	₱402,500 + 30% of the excess over ₱2,000,000	1%
Over ₱8,000,000	₱2,202,500 + 35% of the excess over ₱8,000,000	0.1%

Additionally, minimum-wage earners are still exempted from PIT. The Law also ensures a minimum wage earner who incurs a small raise will not have his overall salary (with the PIT deducted) less than minimum wage. Also, married couples where both parties are working may be exempted up to ₱500,000. This does not include the exemption from the first ₱90,000 of their thirteenth month pay and additional bonuses. Finally, Self-employed and professionals with gross sales below VAT can only pay 8% flat tax instead of their income and personal tax.

==== Simplified estate and donor's tax ====
The TRAIN aims to simplify property purchases, transfers and donations in order to make the land market more efficient thus ensuring the usage of properties is maximized.

The estate tax is now reduced to 6% based on the net value of the property. It also has a standard deduction of ₱5 million as well as a ₱10 million exemption on the family home.

The donor tax is also reduced to 6% of the net donations for gifts above ₱250,000 yearly.

==== Simplified value added tax ====
The government's aim to elevate the less fortunate in the Philippines and drive development is exemplified as the TRAIN repeals 54 out of 61 of the non-essential VAT exemption. In order to protect these less fortunate persons, as well as small and micro businesses, they are exempted from VAT on goods and services of marginal establishments. VAT exempt tax payers now have the option to:

- PIT schedule with 40% OSD on gross receipts or gross sales plus 3% percentage tax
- PIT schedule with itemized deductions plus 3% percentage tax, or
- Flat tax of 8% on gross sales or gross revenues in lieu of percentage tax and personal income tax.

"TRAIN aims to clean up the VAT system to make it fairer and simpler and lower the cost of compliance for both the taxpayers and tax administrators". As such, VAT exemptions are now only limited to health, education and raw agriculture food. In 2019, medicines for hypertension, high cholesterol and diabetes will be exempted from VAT. Similarly, purchases from senior citizens and persons with disabilities. Housing that costs less than ₱2 million shall also be exempted starting in 2021.

==== Excise Tax of petroleum products ====
This tax aims to increase efforts towards decreasing the consumption of harmful fuel, and veering towards a healthier, more sustainable future. The price of fuel also varies due to the global inflation of oil. Listed below is the effect of the Petroleum Excise Tax (note: the additional excise tax is per liter)

Excise Tax per Liter	Current	2018	2019	2020
LPG	₱0	₱1.00	₱2.00	₱3.00
Diesel	₱0	₱2.50	₱4.50	₱6.00
Regular and unleaded premium gasoline	₱4.35	₱7.00	₱9.00	₱10.00

Listed below are the new excise taxes for specific fuel products for the year 2018

Petroleum Product	Excise Tax per Liter
LPG	₱1.00
Bunker Fuels	₱2.50
Diesel	₱2.50
Petcoke	₱2.50
Kerosene	₱3.00
Aviation gas	₱4.00
Gasoline	₱7.00
Naphtha	₱7.00
Asphalt	₱8.00
Asphalt	₱8.00
Lubricating oil	₱8.00
Paraffin wax	₱8.00
Refined fuels	₱8.00

==== Excise Tax of Automobiles increase ====
The table below summarizes the excise taxes on automobiles. The second column illustrates the tax rate on vehicles based on their specific price range. The third column portrays the actual average effective tax rate. Because the TRAIN law increases the PIT of 99% of the population, their increase in net income will still be more than enough to compensate for the effects of the excise tax on automobiles. This means they still benefit from the TRAIN as they incur additional disposable income in the end. In addition, because richer tax payers tend to purchase more cars, the additional revenue from this tax will mostly come from them.

Automobile prices	Tax Rate	Average effective tax rate
₱600,000 and below	4%	3%
₱600,000 to ₱1,000,000	10%	8%
₱1,000,000 to ₱4,000,000	20%	15%
₱4,000,000 and above	50%	30%

==== Excise Tax on Sweetened Beverages ====
"The SSB (Sugar-Sweetened Beverages) tax will promote a healthier Philippines". It achieves this by reducing the increasing number of diabetes and obesity cases, through raising awareness, promoting the consumption of healthier products and encourage companies to innovate healthier alternatives.

TRAIN imposes new taxes of ₱6 per liter on drinks containing sweeteners and ₱12 per liter on drinks containing high-fructose corn syrup. Milk, 100% natural juice and 3-in-1 instant coffee drinks are exempt from the excise tax.

=== Additional Excise Taxes ===
There are three additional excise taxes, namely coal, cosmetics and tobacco.

==== Coal Excise Tax ====
Coal is a cheap source for power generation and has its uses in multiple industries such as the chemical and pharmaceutical industries. It is also a prime ingredient for activated carbon, carbon fiber and silicon metal. However, it remains a major source for air pollution in the Philippines. The aim of the excise tax is to shift towards renewable energies and generate additional income for building infrastructures and social services. The excise tax on coal will increase from its original ₱10/Metric Ton(MT) to ₱50/MT on both domestic and imported coal. ₱50/MT will be added each succeeding year until January when the rate would have reached ₱150/MT.

==== Cosmetics Tax ====
Starting 2018, all cosmetic surgeries, aesthetic procedures, and body enhancements intended to improve, alter, or enhance a person's appearance are now subject to a tax of 5%.

However, procedures necessary to ameliorate a deformity arising from, or directly related to a congenital or developmental defect or abnormality, a personal injury resulting to an accident or trauma, or disfiguring disease, tumor, virus or infection are tax -exempted.

==== Tobacco Tax ====
The excise tax on cigarettes aims to reduce the amount of smokers and respiratory and cardiovascular diseases one can catch from the act, as well as generate additional revenue for health oriented programs and services.

From its original excise tax of ₱30 in 2017, the tax on tobacco increased to ₱32.50 on January 1, 2018, ₱35 on July 1, 2018, will increase to ₱37.50 on January 1, 2019, and ₱40 on January 1, 2020. Afterwards, it will increase annually by 4% from January 1, 2024.

=== Financial Taxes ===
There are four taxes that were adjusted along with the TRAIN Law. Firstly, the documentary stamp tax was increased by 100% except on loans with only 50% increase, but not for savings, property, and non-life insurance. Secondly, the final tax on foreign currency deposit unit (FCDU) was increased from 7.5% to 15% of interest income. Thirdly, capital gains tax of non-traded stock was increased from 5% to 10% of final net gains. Finally, the stock transaction tax was increased from 0.5% to 0.6% of total transaction value.

=== Others ===
Finally, there are three additional taxes that do not fall under the aforementioned categories. These are the tax on lottery winnings and PCSO prizes, documentary stamp tax, and mining tax. With the implementation of the TRAIN Law, all PCSO lotto prizes are taxed at 20% if the prize exceeds ₱10,000. The documentary stamp tax has been doubled, resulting in stamp taxes ranging from ₱1.50 to ₱3.00. Finally, excise tax rates on all non-metallic minerals and quarry resources, and all metallic minerals including copper, gold and chromite, will be doubled, from 2% to 4%, as well as excise tax on indigenous petroleum, which will be doubled from 3% to 6%.

== Projected effects ==
The three main categories the TRAIN Law affects with its first package are "Growth in the Economy", "Employment Generation", and "Effect on Inflation". The DOF projects the economy to grow by 1.3% by 2022 with a 0.42% inflation due to the excise tax increase (this is still within the 2–4% target inflation by the Bangko Sentral ng Pilipinas (BSP); it also predicts to create half a million jobs over the next ten years, and eight million over the entirety of its life, as well as lift 250,000 Filipinos out of poverty. Through the increase in excise tax, Package 1 will be able to generate ₱134 billion. The actual effects in 2018 are elaborated below.

=== Economic growth ===
For the first quarter of 2018, the government was able to raise ₱619.84 billion. This represents a 16.4% growth in revenue compared to the first quarter of 2017. In monetary terms, the government was able to raise ₱87.44 billion more in this quarter of 2018 compared to the previous year. "The Philippine economy expanded by 6.8 percent in the first quarter of 2018, making it still one of the fastest-growing economies in the region even as rising inflation reduced consumption and productivity in some sectors." DOF Secretary Carlos Dominguez III claimed tax revenues grew by 18.2%, "exceeding the 9.7 percent nominal gross domestic product (GDP) growth."

Departments that saw immediate benefits from Package 1 include the Bureau of Internal Revenue and Bureau of Customs, both with a 14.2% and 24.7% increase in revenue. This translates to ₱423.1 billion and ₱129.8 for both departments respectively. Other government departments were able to expand their investment and growths during the first quarter as well due to the increase in income.

Insofar as expenditures go for the first quarter of 2018, the total amounted to ₱782.0 billion, growing by 27.1%, which also outstripped the 9.7% nominal GDP growth due to the estimated 40.0% increase in capital outlays. Dominquez also said that the expenditure effort also rose by 2.73%, which is the highest increase since 2003. This results in a larger contribution towards GDP growth. As such, revenue effort grew by 0.91%. In addition, public construction expanded by 25.1%, thus boosting GDP growth by 0.4%. On the other hand, government consumption increased by 13.6%, contributing an incremental 1.4% to the growth of the GDP. "'Strong macroeconomic fundamentals backed by tax reforms and the Build, build, build program will continue to boost economic growth to the optimum 7–8 percent level as the competitiveness of the economy rises and more jobs are created,' he said."

=== Inflation ===
Socioeconomic Planning Secretary Ernesto Pernia claims that the inflation will most likely peak on the third quarter of the year and start tapering off by October. "The inflation rate in June—which exceeded both government and market expectations—was the fastest pace in at least five years. Year-to-date, inflation averaged 4.3 percent, above the BSP's 2–4 percent target range." According to the PSA, headline inflation "peaked at 5.2 percent for the same month. For the previous months, inflation was pegged at 4.6 percent and in the same period in 2017, 2.5 percent."

The PSA said this was primarily due to the higher annual rate posted in the heavily weighted food and non-alcoholic beverages index at 6.1%. The country's food index went up by 5.8% in June 2018. It was 5.5% in the previous month and 3.1% in June 2017. The following annual markups were also observed for the following food groups:

- Rice (4.7%)
- Corn (14.1%)
- Other Cereals, Flour, Cereal Preparation, Bread, Pasta and Other Bakery Products (2.4%);
- Meat (5.0%);
- Vegetables (8.6%);
- Sugar, Jam, Honey, Chocolate and Confectionery (3.9%); and
- Food Products not Elsewhere Classified (3.1%).

As for the rest of the food groups, they either slowed down or remained at their previous month's rate.

== Effects ==
=== Poverty ===
Studies by the Philippine Institute for Development Studies said that the TRAIN law likely worsened poverty and income inequality for millions of Filipinos.

=== Oil price hikes ===
Despite eight consecutive weeks of oil price rollbacks in 2018, the TRAIN law caused the retail price of oil products to remain high, which caused inflationary outcomes that affect the poor more than the rich, according to research group IBON Foundation.

=== Consumer prices ===
Consumer prices increased by 6.7% in September 2018 due to the TRAIN law, which was the highest surge in 9 years.

== Reactions ==
The TRAIN Law took effect in January 2018. Since its implementation, there have been numerous individuals for and against the new tax reform, such as Budget Secretary Benjamin Diokno who has expressed support for the law as the additional revenues provide funds for government initiatives. Senators who opposed the law or parts of the law include Sen. Risa Hontiveros, Sen. Bam Aquino and Sen. Grace Poe. During a press briefing on June 2, 2018, President Duterte said that he would let Congress decide whether to amend or suspend the law.

=== In favor to the law ===
The senators who voted for the bill were Senators Sonny Angara, Nancy Binay, Frank Drilon, JV Ejercito, Chiz Escudero, Win Gatchalian, Dick Gordon, Gringo Honasan, Loren Legarda, Joel Villanueva, Koko Pimentel, Grace Poe, Ralph Recto, Tito Sotto, Cynthia Villar and Migz Zubiri.

==== Appeal to foreign investors ====
One of the goals of the TRAIN law is to make the economic environment of the Philippines more appealing to foreign investors. The reforms being implemented by the Duterte administration have been recognized and lauded by international institutions, leading to strong investor confidence and better growth prospects for the economy. This is also being pushed forward by the Department of Finance by submitting its proposal for Package 2 of its tax reform program to congress which aims to reduce corporate income tax rates and rationalize fiscal incentives.

==== Managing the effects of inflation ====
According to the DOF's chief economist, Gil Beltran, the moderate rise in inflation is only temporary and remains manageable under a robust economy even with the implementation of the TRAIN law. It will be remedied by the increased spending on infrastructure and social services to keep inflation in check in the future which was what the president was hoping to achieve with the implementation of this law. TRAIN is seen as a long-term measure that would hope to push the economy to a much higher development path, create more jobs and improve the living conditions for our people. However this comes with the rising of inflation which would be mitigated by lower income tax rates and implementing cash transfers for the short-term, and; the health, education, social protection, and infrastructure programs in the medium- and long-term.

=== Opposition ===
==== Burden to the poor and higher prices of goods and services ====
Critics of the TRAIN law contend that it will be a burden to the poor. While the TRAIN gives tax exemptions or reductions to income by marginal earners and minimum salaried workers, it will also raise prices of basic goods and services. Price hikes for food, transportation, and utilities will make it difficult for low-income families to cope with the rising cost of living.

In May 2018, commuters signed a petition against the TRAIN law, citing price increases since the law's implementation.

==== Procedural concerns in Congress ====
The Makabayan bloc filed a petition for a temporary restraining order against the law. The petition was anchored on the argument that the tax law was invalid because there was no quorum when the House of Representatives ratified the joint bicameral conference report on the measure, and there was no voting involved. The petitioners provided links to official videos and photos that would show there was no quorum "with barely 10 people on the floor." The petitioners also argued that the draft law did not obtain the required majority vote. According to the petitioners, a vote whether viva voce or nominal, was not taken. The official video of the process shows Antonio Tinio and Carlos Zarate repeatedly objecting to the ratification, but Raneo Abu and Arthur Defensor Jr. continued with the process until the voices of the petitioners were no longer heard because the microphone had been turned off. Aside from the House rules, the petitioners said Section 16(2), Article VI of the Constitution that requires a quorum was also violated.

==== Call for suspension ====
In July 2018, three senators called for the suspension of the implementation of the Tax Reform for Acceleration and Inclusion (TRAIN) law as consumers and transport groups complained of soaring prices of commodities. These were on the grounds that the law was not beneficial to the majority of Filipinos, due to the increase in prices of oil products and commodities, a family has incurred an additional expense of ₱2,644 monthly for farmers and ₱3,640 for workers.

In November 2021, a House of Representatives committee approved a bill to temporarily suspend or reduce excise tax on fuel products to address oil price hikes in the Philippines, and ease the effect of price hikes on transport and agricultural workers.

==== Call for exception ====
In February 2023, Danilo Ramos of peasant organization Kilusang Magbubukid ng Pilipinas called on President Bongbong Marcos to remove the VAT on oil to lower the price of petroleum products, ease inflation, and give financial relief to poor families.

==== Amendments ====
Senator Bam Aquino wanted to pass a measure that seeks to amend TRAIN to protect Filipinos from soaring prices. Aquino explained that the Senate's version of the TRAIN law had a safeguard that would automatically suspend fuel excise tax if the forecast rate was exceeded and this amendment was to bring that sole safeguard back. According to the senator, this was a necessary step in order to protect the future well beings of the Filipino people.

The Department of Energy requested amendments to the TRAIN law to allow government to suspend excise taxes on petroleum products.

=== Protests ===
Duterte's signing of the TRAIN Law has led to protests and indignation rallies. Protesters explained that for workers earning the minimum wage of ₱512, only ₱70 will be left for food because of the soaring cost of rent, education, LPG, personal hygiene, and commodities. Militant groups warned that many Filipinos will face hunger due to the excise tax that will be imposed on various goods.

== SC decision ==
The Supreme Court en banc, in its session on January 24, 2023, in 13–1 (one on leave) vote, dismissed consolidated petitions from consumer group Laban Konsyumer and former Makabayan bloc legislators to declare the TRAIN law as unconstitutional.
