= Rafael V. Mariano =

Filipino politician (born 1956)

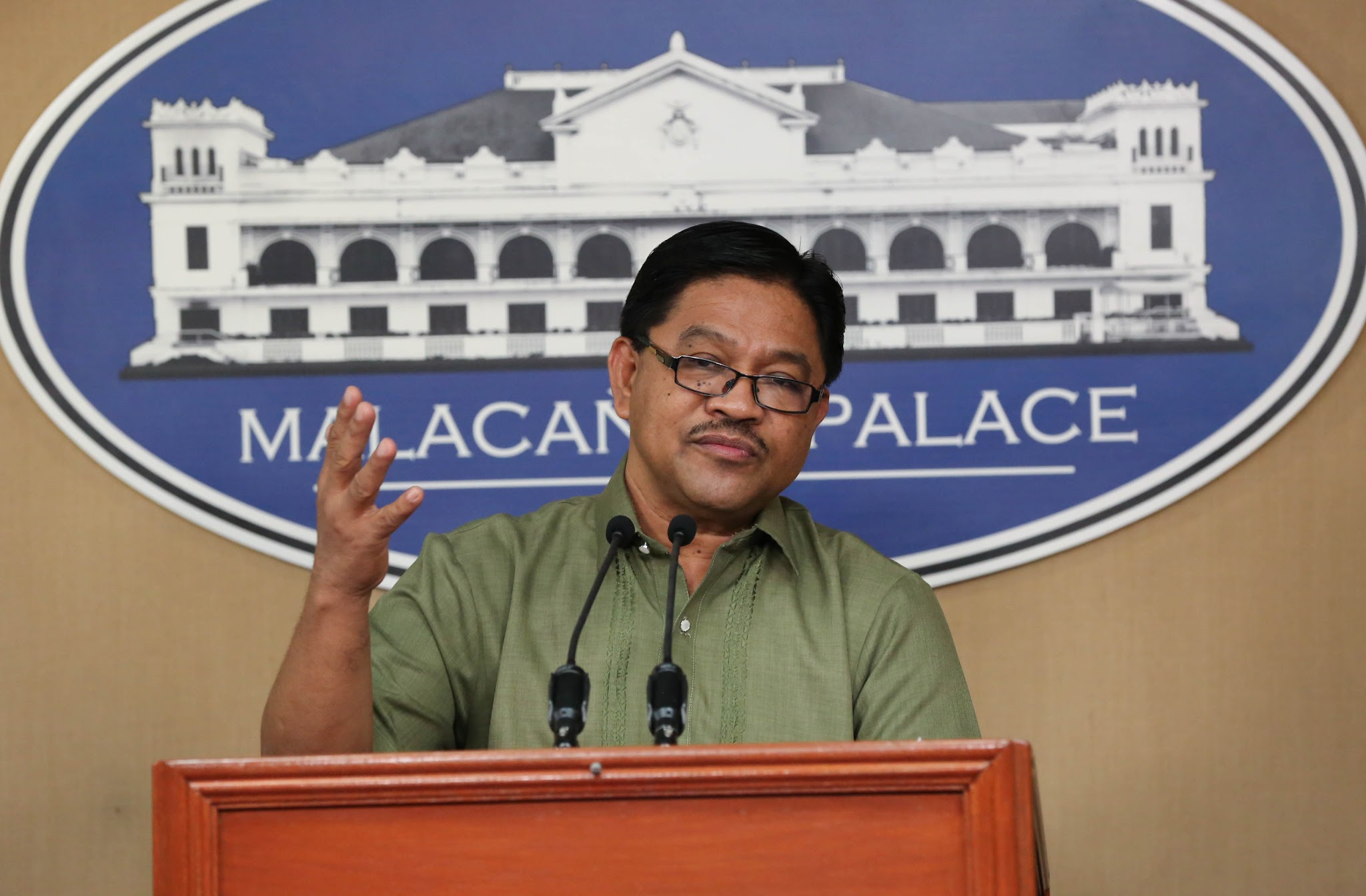
- Mariano in September 2016

Secretary of Agrarian Reform
- Ad interim
- In office June 30, 2016 – September 6, 2017
- President: Rodrigo Duterte
- Preceded by: Virgilio de los Reyes
- Succeeded by: Rosalina Bistoyong (OIC)

Member of the Philippine House of Representatives for Anakpawis
- In office June 30, 2004 – June 30, 2013

Personal details
- Born: Rafael Vitriolo Mariano; October 24, 1956 (age 69)
- Party: Anakpawis
- Spouse: Estrelita Mariano
- Profession: Politician, Farmer

Rafael "Ka Paeng" Vitriolo Mariano (born October 24, 1956) is a Filipino activist and politician. He is a former member of the House of Representatives for Anakpawis, serving from 2004 to 2013. He is also the chairman of the farmers militant group Kilusang Magbubukid ng Pilipinas (KMP).

Mariano served as Secretary of the Department of Agrarian Reform under the administration of President Rodrigo Duterte, who appointed him, after being nominated by the National Democratic Front. His appointment as Secretary of Agrarian Reform was rejected by the Commission on Appointments (CA) on September 6, 2017, making him the 4th member of the Duterte Cabinet to be rejected by the CA.

== Early life ==
Mariano was born on October 24, 1956, to a poor family in the municipality of Quezon, Nueva Ecija. He was a farmer who took up agriculture and agri-cooperatives at the Wesleyan University and Christian College of the Philippines (formerly Liwag Colleges) in Cabanatuan. He was not able to graduate from both institutions due to financial difficulties and his father's illness.

== Activism and political career ==
Mariano joined the Bisig ng Kabataan (Youth Arm), a local youth activist organization, when he was 20 years old. He was elected as councilor of Quezon, Nueva Ecija five years later in 1981. He became the regional vice chairman of the Alyansa ng Magbubukid sa Gitnang Luzon (Central Luzon Farmers' Alliance) in 1984 and as the first secretary-general of the Kilusang Magbubukid ng Pilipinas (Peasant Movement of the Philippines; KMP) in 1985. He was among the survivors of the 1987 Mendiola massacre. Mariano was later elected as its national vice chairman in 1990, effectively serving as acting chairman while Chairman Jaime Tadeo was in prison.

In July 1993, a month before Tadeo was released on parole, Mariano accused Tadeo of committing estafa as chairman of the KMP, which caused the organization to fracture into two factions between followers of Tadeo and Mariano. Three months later, Tadeo was impeached as chairman, and by November 1993, Mariano was elected national chairman of the KMP, a position he held into the 2010s.

In 1998, he assumed the chairmanship of the Bagong Alyansang Makabayan. He was nominated to the Anakpawis party-list in the 2004 general elections and served as the party's representative in the Philippine House of Representatives until 2013. During his term, he pressed for the passage of the Genuine Agrarian Reform Bill which aimed to distribute land to farmers for free. He was one of five progressive legislators who were detained for 2 months in 2006 in the Batasang Pambansa Complex on charges of plotting to overthrow the government of then President Gloria Arroyo.

=== Secretary of Agrarian Reform ===
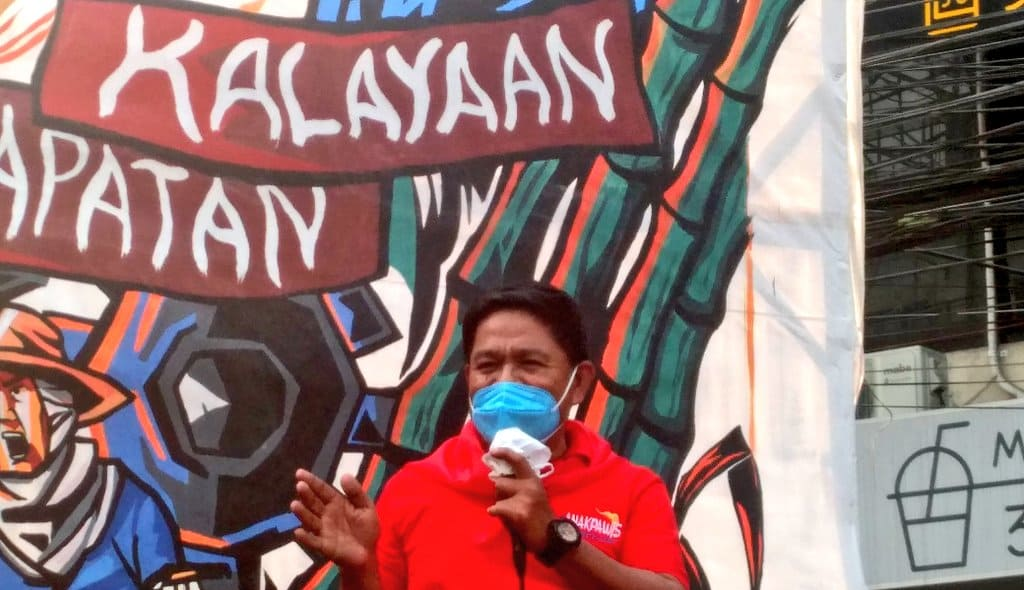
Rafael Mariano, Bonifacio Day, 2021

Following his victory in the 2016 elections, President Rodrigo Duterte offered cabinet positions to the National Democratic Front of the Philippines. The NDFP declined the offer and instead nominated who they felt were qualified candidates. The NDFP nominated Mariano for the position of Secretary of Agrarian Reform which Duterte accepted at the start of his term.

Mariano served as DAR Secretary from July 2016 to September 2017. As DAR Secretary, Mariano spearheaded initiatives for land distribution and supported calls for genuine agrarian reform, including land distribution in Hacienda Luisita.

He was removed following the rejection of his interim appointment by the Commission on Appointments. Malacanang was said to "regret" the CA's decision to reject Mariano's appointment.

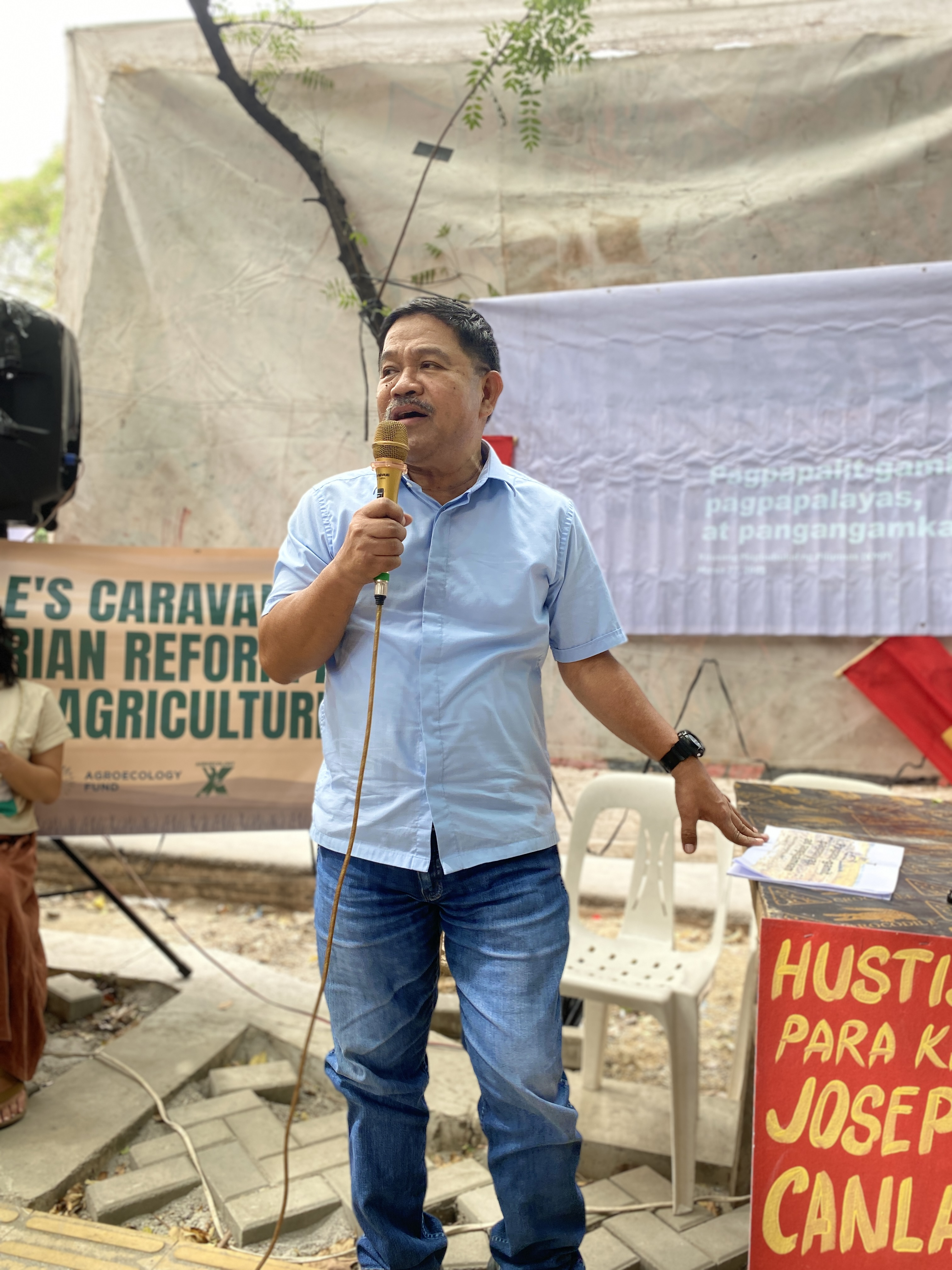
Mariano, speaking in front of Central Luzon farmers who camped out outside the Department of Agrarian Reform

=== Post-Secretaryship ===
Mariano remained a major figure in the struggle of Philippine peasants for genuine land reform. He became the chairperson emeritus of KMP and a staunch critic of both the Duterte and Marcos Jr. administrations.

Political offices
Preceded by Virgilio de los Reyes	Secretary of Agrarian Reform; 2016–2017	Succeeded by John R. Castriciones
