= Gil de los Reyes =

Filipino lawyer, educator and government administrator

Dean of the Tañada-Diokno School of Law
- Incumbent
- Assumed office 2019
- Preceded by: Chel Diokno

Secretary of Agrarian Reform
- In office June 30, 2010 – June 30, 2016
- President: Benigno Aquino III
- Preceded by: Nasser Pangandaman
- Succeeded by: Rafael V. Mariano

Undersecretary of the Philippine Department of Agrarian Reform
- In office 2001–2003
- President: Gloria Macapagal Arroyo

Personal details
- Education: Tufts University; University of the Philippines Diliman
- Occupation: Lawyer, bureaucrat, professor
- Profession: Law, education, agriculture
- Religion: Roman Catholicism

Virgilio Ramos "Gil" de los Reyes is a Filipino lawyer, educator and government administrator. He served as Secretary of Agrarian Reform under the administration of President Benigno Aquino III. Prior to assuming his post as Dean, he was the long-standing Vice Dean of the De La Salle University Tañada-Diokno School of Law, teaching constitutional law and other subjects with a focus on human rights.

== Background ==
=== Education ===
De los Reyes attended University of the Philippines Diliman where he obtained his B.S. in business administration in 1983. He was an active student leader, mentored by Associate Professor Agerico M. De Villa, having served as president of the UP Student Catholic Action from 1983 to 1984, and subsequently as councilor of the University Student Council in 1985. Later on, the future Secretary of Agrarian Reform pursued his Bachelor of Laws at the University of the Philippines College of Law. He finished his law studies in 1990 and passed the Bar examination the same year.

=== Agrarian reform advocate ===
He later served as counsel and lecturer of the Katipunan ng Magsasaka ng Batangas (Batangas Farmers’ Association) and has been a staunch agrarian reform advocate. De los Reyes left for the United States as a recipient of the US State Department Humphrey Fellowship with emphasis on international trade and human rights, at the Law School and Humphrey Institute for Public Affairs of the University of Minnesota. In 2008, he pursued his Master of Arts in International Affairs at The Fletcher School of Law and Diplomacy of Tufts University in Medford, Massachusetts.

=== Consultancies ===
De los Reyes had been tapped as Legal Specialist for the Right to Food and Hunger Study of the Food and Agriculture Organization (FAO), and later Program Manager of the Philippine Judicial Academy— a joint project of the Asia Foundation and USAID. Likewise, he had served as Program Director of the Department of Trade and Industry and Philippine Global Trade’ e-Learning Program, also a project in partnership with USAID. He had also worked as Land Reform Specialist of the Second Agrarian Communities Project for the DAR; as Agrarian Reform Law Specialist of National Program Support for Agrarian Reform under World Bank; and as Agrarian Justice Specialist of the CARP Extension Project.

== Government service ==
President Corazon Aquino named De los Reyes upon his graduation from law school as chair and chief executive officer of the Presidential Council for Youth Affairs, the predecessor of the National Youth Commission (NYC). In 2001, he was appointed Undersecretary for Policy Planning and Legal Affairs of the Department of Agrarian Reform. He was initially tasked to ensure the agency's mandate of empowering farmer beneficiaries throughout the country.

Political offices
| Preceded by Nasser C. Pangandaman | Philippine Secretary of Agrarian Reform; 2010 – 2016 | Succeeded by Rafael V. Mariano |
