= Land reform in the Philippines =

Land reform in the Philippines has long been a contentious issue rooted in the concentration of land ownership in landed elites during the Spanish colonial period. Some state-led land reform initiatives began during the American colonial period, following independence in response to the Huk Rebellion, during martial law, and especially following the People Power Revolution in 1986.

The current law, the Comprehensive Agrarian Reform Program (CARP), was passed in 1986 but its implementation remains unfinished to this day. Strong peasant movement mobilization that maximized CARP for land claims in the 1990s made significant yet partial land redistribution possible, encompassing about half of total agricultural lands and benefitting three-fifths of all agricultural households. However, loopholes and weaknesses in the law have been used to evade and reverse reforms.

Aside from pushing for the completion of land redistribution under CARP, peasant movements have called attention to increasing violence against land claimants, reversals of redistribution in favor of former and new landowners, aggressive agricultural land-use conversions, and lack of government support services for beneficiaries. As of 2026, the Department of Agrarian Reform says 700,000 hectares of agricultural lands have yet to be awarded to farmers.

== History ==
Much like Mexico and other Spanish colonies in the Americas, the Spanish settlement in the Philippines revolved around the encomienda system of plantations, known as haciendas. As the 19th century progressed, industrialization and liberalization of trade allowed these encomiendas to expand their cash crops, establishing a strong sugar industry in the Philippines, especially in the Visayan island of Negros.

=== American period ===
The United States of America obtained the Spanish claim over the Philippines following the Spanish–American War in 1898 and conquered the country from the Philippine Republic after the Philippine–American War in 1902. The Second Philippine Commission, the Taft Commission, viewed economic development as one of its top three goals. In 1901, 93% of the islands' land area was held by the government and William Howard Taft, Governor-General of the Philippines, argued for a liberal policy so that a good portion could be sold off to American investors. Instead, the United States Congress, influenced by agricultural interests that did not want competition from the Philippines, in the 1902 Land Act, set a limit of 16 hectares of land to be sold or leased to American individuals and 1,024 hectares to American corporations. This and a downturn in the investment environment discouraged the foreign-owned plantations common in British Malaya, the Dutch East Indies, and French Indochina.

Further the U.S. Federal Government faced the problem of much of the private land being owned by the Catholic Church and controlled by Spanish clerics. The American government—officially secular, hostile to continued Spanish control of much of the land of the now-American colony, and long hostile to Catholics—negotiated a settlement with the Church handing over its land.

The 1902 Philippine Organic Act was a constitution for the Insular Government, as the U.S. civil administration was known. This act, among other actions, disestablished the Catholic Church as the state religion. The United States government, in an effort to resolve the status of the friars, negotiated with the Vatican. The church agreed to sell the friars' estates and promised gradual substitution of Filipino and other non-Spanish priests for the friars. It refused, however, to withdraw the religious orders from the islands immediately, partly to avoid offending Spain. In 1904 the administration bought for $7.2 million the major part of the friars' holdings, amounting to some 166,000 hectares (410,000 acres), of which one-half was in the vicinity of Manila. The land was eventually resold to Filipinos, some of them tenants but the majority of them estate owners.

=== Commonwealth Period ===
During the American Colonial Period, tenant farmers complained about the sharecropping system, as well as by the dramatic increase in population which added economic pressure to the tenant farmers' families. As a result, an agrarian reform program was initiated by the Commonwealth. However, success of the program was hampered by ongoing clashes between tenants and landowners.

An example of these clashes includes one initiated by Benigno Ramos through his Sakdalista movement, which advocated tax reductions, land reforms, the breakup of the large estates or haciendas, and the severing of American ties. The uprising, which occurred in Central Luzon in May 1935, claimed about a hundred lives

==== Rice Share Tenancy Act of 1933 ====
When the Philippine Commonwealth was established, President Manuel L. Quezon implemented the Rice Share Tenancy Act of 1933. The purpose of this act was to regulate the share-tenancy contracts by establishing minimum standards. Primarily, the Act provided for better tenant-landlord relationship, a 50–50 sharing of the crop, regulation of interest to 10% per agricultural year, and a safeguard against arbitrary dismissal by the landlord. The major flaw of this law was that it could be used only when the majority of municipal councils in a province petitioned for it. Since landowners usually controlled such councils, no province ever asked that the law be applied. Therefore, Quezón ordered that the act be mandatory in all Central Luzon provinces. However, contracts were good only for one year. By simply refusing the renew their contract, landlords were able to eject tenants. As a result, peasant organizations agitated in vain for a law that would make the contract automatically renewable for as long as the tenants fulfilled their obligations.

In 1936, this Act was amended to get rid of its loophole, but the landlords made its application relative and not absolute. Consequently, it was never carried out in spite of its good intentions. In fact, by 1939, thousands of peasants in Central Luzon were being threatened with wholesale eviction. By the early 1940s, thousands of tenants in Central Luzon were ejected from their farmlands and the rural conflict was more acute than ever.

Therefore, during the Commonwealth period, agrarian problems persisted. This motivated the government to incorporate a cardinal principle on social justice. Dictated by the social justice program of the government, expropriation of landed estates and other landholdings commenced. Likewise, the National Land Settlement Administration (NSLA) began an orderly settlement of public agricultural lands. At the outbreak of the Second World War, major settlement areas containing more than 65,000 hectares were already established.

=== Roxas administration ===
When the Philippines gained its independence in 1946, much of the land was held by a small group of wealthy landowners. There was much pressure on the democratically elected government to redistribute the land. At the same time, many of the democratically elected office holders were landowners themselves or came from land-owning families.

In 1946, shortly after his induction to presidency, Manuel Roxas proclaimed the Rice Share Tenancy Act of 1933 effective throughout the country. However problems of land tenure continued. In fact these became worse in certain areas. Among the remedial measures enacted was Republic Act No. 34 likewise known as the Tenant Act which provided for a 70–30 sharing arrangements and regulated share-tenancy contracts. It was passed to resolve the ongoing peasant unrest in Central Luzon.

As part of his Agrarian Reform agenda, President Elpidio Quirino issued on October 23, 1950, Executive Order No. 355 which replaced the National Land Settlement Administration with Land Settlement Development Corporation (LASEDECO) which takes over the responsibilities of the Agricultural Machinery Equipment Corporation and the Rice and Corn Production Administration.

=== Ramon Magsaysay administration ===
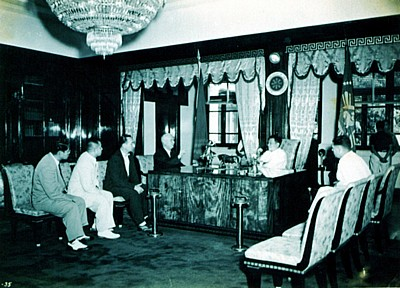
President Ramon Magsaysay at the Presidential Study, Malacañang Palace

To amplify and stabilize the functions of the Economic Development Corps (EDCOR), President Ramon Magsaysay worked for the establishment of the National Resettlement and Rehabilitation Administration (NARRA), which took over from the EDCOR and helped in the giving of some sixty-five thousand acres to three thousand indigent families for settlement purposes. Again, it allocated some other twenty-five thousand to a little more than one thousand five hundred landless families, who subsequently became farmers.

As further aid to the rural people, the president established the Agricultural Credit and Cooperative Administration (ACCFA). The idea was for this entity to make available rural credits. Records show that it did grant, in this wise, almost ten million dollars. This administration body next devoted its attention to cooperative marketing.

Along this line of help to the rural areas, President Magsaysay initiated the artesian wells campaign. A group-movement known as the Liberty Wells Association was formed and managed to raise a considerable sum for the construction of artesian wells, which are of considerable socio-economic value.

Finally, vast irrigation projects, as well as enhancement of the Ambuklao Power plant and other similar ones, went a long way towards bringing to reality the rural improvement program advocated by President Magsaysay.

President Ramón Magsaysay enacted the following laws as part of his Agrarian Reform Program:

- Republic Act No. 1160 of 1954 – Abolished the LASEDECO and established the National Resettlement and Rehabilitation Administration (NARRA) to resettle dissidents and landless farmers. It was particularly aimed at rebel returnees providing home lots and farmlands in Palawan and Mindanao.
- Republic Act No. 1199 (Agricultural Tenancy Act of 1954) – Governed the relationship between landowners and tenant farmers by organizing share-tenancy and leasehold system. The law provided the security of tenure of tenants. It also created the Court of Agrarian Relations.
- Republic Act No. 1400 (Land Reform Act of 1955) – Created the Land Tenure Administration (LTA) which was responsible for the acquisition and distribution of large tenanted rice and corn lands over 200 hectares for individuals and 600 hectares for corporations.
- Republic Act No. 821 (Creation of Agricultural Credit Cooperative Financing Administration) – Provided small farmers and share tenants loans with low interest rates of six to eight percent.

=== Macapagal administration ===
==== Land Reform Code ====
The Agricultural Land Reform Code (RA 3844) was a major Philippine land reform law enacted in 1963 under President Diosdado Macapagal.

The code declared that it was State policy

1. To establish owner-cultivatorship and the economic family-size farm as the basis of Philippine agriculture and, as a consequence, divert landlord capital in agriculture to industrial development;
2. To achieve a dignified existence for the small farmers free from pernicious institutional restraints and practices;
3. To create a truly viable social and economic structure in agriculture conducive to greater productivity and higher farm incomes;
4. To apply all labor laws equally and without discrimination to both industrial and agricultural wage earners;
5. To provide a more vigorous and systematic land resettlement program and public land distribution; and
6. To make the small farmers more independent, self-reliant and responsible citizens, and a source of genuine strength in our democratic society.

and, in pursuance of those policies, established the following

1. An agricultural leasehold system to replace all existing share tenancy systems in agriculture;
2. A declaration of rights for agricultural labor;
3. An authority for the acquisition and equitable distribution of agricultural land;
4. An institution to finance the acquisition and distribution of agricultural land;
5. A machinery to extend credit and similar assistance to agriculture;
6. A machinery to provide marketing, management, and other technical services to agriculture;
7. A unified administration for formulating and implementing projects of land reform;
8. An expanded program of land capability survey, classification, and registration; and
9. A judicial system to decide issues arising under this Code and other related laws and regulations.

=== Marcos administration ===
On September 10, 1971, President Ferdinand E. Marcos signed the Code of Agrarian Reform of the Philippines into law which established the Department of Agrarian Reform, effectively replacing the Land Authority.

In 1978, the DAR was renamed the Ministry of Agrarian Reform. Marcos issued presidential decree number 27, which confiscated rice or corn lands over 7 hectares by the Ministry of Agrarian Reform and gave it to qualified tenants of the landowner. However, many landowners were not paid because of martial law.

=== Corazon Aquino administration ===
In 1988, under the 1987 Constitution framework, which was signed by then-President Cory Aquino, the Comprehensive Agrarian Reform Law created the Comprehensive Agrarian Reform Program (CARP).

On July 26, 1987, following the People Power Revolution, the Ministry of Agrarian Reform was re-organized through Executive Order (EO) No. 129-A.

President Corazon Aquino envisioned agrarian and land reform as the centerpiece of her administration's social legislative agenda. However, her family background and social class as a privileged daughter of a wealthy and landed clan became a lightning rod of criticisms against her land reform agenda. On January 22, 1987, less than a month before the ratification of the 1987 Constitution, agrarian workers and farmers marched to the historic Mendiola Street near the Malacañan Palace to demand genuine land reform from Aquino's administration. However, the march turned violent when Marine forces fired at farmers who tried to go beyond the designated demarcation line set by the police. As a result, 12 farmers were killed and 19 were injured in this incident now known as the Mendiola massacre. This incident led some prominent members of the Aquino Cabinet to resign their government posts.

In response to calls for agrarian reform, President Aquino issued Presidential Proclamation 131 and Executive Order 229 on July 22, 1987, which outlined her land reform program, which included sugar lands. In 1988, with the backing of Aquino, the new Congress of the Philippines passed Republic Act No. 6657, more popularly known as the Comprehensive Agrarian Reform Law. The law paved the way for the redistribution of agricultural lands to tenant-farmers from landowners, who were paid in exchange by the government through just compensation but were also allowed to retain not more than five hectares of land. However, corporate landowners were also allowed under the law to "voluntarily divest a proportion of their capital stock, equity or participation in favor of their workers or other qualified beneficiaries", in lieu of turning over their land to the government for redistribution. Despite the flaws in the law, the Supreme Court upheld its constitutionality in 1989, declaring that the implementation of the comprehensive agrarian reform program (CARP) provided by the said law, was "a revolutionary kind of expropriation".

Despite the implementation of CARP, Aquino was not spared from the controversies that eventually centered on Hacienda Luisita, a 6,453-hectare estate located in the Province of Tarlac, which she, together with her siblings inherited from her father Jose Cojuangco (Don Pepe).

Critics argued that Aquino bowed to pressure from relatives by allowing stock redistribution under Executive Order 229. Instead of land distribution, Hacienda Luisita reorganized itself into a corporation and distributed stock. As such, ownership of agricultural portions of the hacienda were transferred to the corporation, which in turn, gave its shares of stocks to farmers.

The arrangement remained in force until 2006, when the Department of Agrarian Reform revoked the stock distribution scheme adopted in Hacienda Luisita, and ordered instead the redistribution of a large portion of the property to the tenant-farmers. The Department stepped into the controversy when in 2004, violence erupted over the retrenchment of workers in the Hacienda, eventually leaving seven people dead.

=== Ramos administration ===
President Fidel V. Ramos speeded the implementation of the Comprehensive Agrarian Reform Program (CARP) of former President Corazon Aquino in order to meet the ten-year time frame. However, there were constraints such as the need to firm up the database and geographic focus, generate funding support, strengthen inter-agency cooperation, and mobilize implementation partners, like the non-government organizations, local governments, and the business community. In 1992, the government acquired and distributed 382 hectares of land with nearly a quarter of a million farmer-beneficiaries. This constituted 41% of all land titles distributed by the Department of Agrarian Reform (DAR) during the last thirty years. But by the end of 1996, the DAR had distributed only 58.25% of the total area it was supposed to cover. From January to December 1997, the DAR distributed 206,612 hectares. That year, since 1987, the DAR had distributed a total of 2.66 million hectares which benefited almost 1.8 million tenant-farmers.

One major problem that the Ramos administration faced was the lack of funds to support and implement the program. The Php50 million, allotted by R.A. No. 6657 to finance the CARP from 1988 to 1998, was no longer sufficient to support the program. To address this problem, Ramos signed R.A. No. 8532 to amend the Comprehensive Agrarian Reform Law (CARL) which further strengthened the CARP by extending the program to another ten years. Ramos signed this law on February 23, 1998 – a few months before the end of Ramos' term.

=== Arroyo administration ===
On September 27, 2004, President Gloria Macapagal Arroyo, signed Executive Order No. 364, and the Department of Agrarian Reform was renamed to Department of Land Reform. This EO also broadened the scope of the department, making it responsible for all land reform in the country. It also placed the Philippine Commission on Urban Poor (PCUP) under its supervision and control. Recognition of the ownership of ancestral domain by indigenous peoples also became the responsibility of this new department, under the National Commission on Indigenous Peoples (NCIP).

On August 23, 2005, President Gloria Macapagal Arroyo signed Executive Order No. 456 and renamed the Department of Land Reform back to Department of Agrarian Reform, since "the Comprehensive Agrarian Reform Law goes beyond just land reform but includes the totality of all factors and support services designed to lift the economic status of the beneficiaries."

=== Noynoy Aquino administration ===
When President Noynoy Aquino took office, there was a renewed push to complete the agrarian reform program. The Department of Agrarian Reform adopted a goal of distributed all CARP-eligible land by the end of Pres. Aquino's term in 2016. As of June 2013, 694,181 hectares remained to be distributed, according to DAR.

Hacienda Luisita, owned by the Cojuangco family, which includes the late former President Corazón C. Aquino and her son, former President Benigno Simeon Cojuangco Aquino III, has been a notable case of land reform.

=== Recent developments ===
Overall, significant peasant mobilizations in the 1990s up to the early 2000s that pushed for CARP implementation allowed for substantial yet partial land redistribution of about half of all agricultural lands benefitting three-fifths of all peasant households. But weaknesses, contradictions, and loopholes in the law have facilitated the evasion by landowners and reversals of land redistribution.

As of 2026, the Department of Agrarian Reform had yet to distribute 700,000 hectares of agricultural lands to farmers. Agrarian movements and their allies are calling on the government to finally finish land redistribution after almost four decades of CARP implementation. They are also raising issues on agrarian violence against land rights claimants, increasing land reform reversals, agricultural land-use conversions, and lack of government support services for beneficiaries.

On September 23, 2026, government officials and agricultural sector representatives convened at the Sotogrande Neopolitan Hotel in Quezon City for a roundtable discussion regarding the integration of farmers and agricultural lands into the Philippine National Action Plan on Business and Human Rights (NAP-BHR). The event was hosted by the National Anti-Poverty Commission – Farmers and Landless Rural Workers Sectoral Council (NAPC-FLRWSC) alongside the Land Justice Initiative (LJI)—a program implemented by KAISAHAN and ANGOC with European Union support—and facilitated by the Presidential Human Rights Committee Secretariat (PHRCS). Attendees reviewed the United Nations Guiding Principles on Business and Human Rights, focusing on state obligations, corporate responsibilities, and remediation pathways relevant to farming communities. Representatives from the Department of Agriculture, the Department of Environment and Natural Resources, the National Commission on Indigenous Peoples, and NAPC-FLRWSC shared sector-specific priorities, emphasizing land tenure, livelihood security, sustainable resource use, and grievance mechanisms, while farmer participants highlighted the necessity of incorporating their experiences into the final framework.

== Comprehensive Agrarian Reform Program ==
The Comprehensive Agrarian Reform Program (CARP) is the current law under which land reform is conducted since its passage in 1988. Public and private agricultural landholdings exceeding five hectares are redistributed to qualified landless farmers and farmworkers, who may include but are not limited to those of that particular estate. CARP covers all agricultural lands regardless of the crop grown, including staple crops like rice and corn but also cash crops like banana, coconut, and sugar.

The law excludes lands dedicated to livestock and aquaculture production, steep slopes over 18 percent, and non-agricultural reclassification prior to CARP's enactment in 1988. Each farmer is given a "certificates of land ownership award" or CLOA for their new property. Under the law, a landowner can only retain 5 hectares, regardless of the size of the landholding. Conflict can arise between previous landowners and "beneficiaries" and between competing farmers' groups that have conflicting claims.

The original 10-year deadline of CARP passed in 1998, but this was extended to December 2008. The Comprehensive Agrarian Reform Program Extension with Reforms (CARPER) was passed the following year, extending the period for the issuance of Notices of Coverage (NOC) for eligible landholdings up to June 30, 2014. No new NOCs could be issued but landholdings issued with NOCs after the deadline remain slated for redistribution. CARP continues to be unfinished almost four decades into its implementation.

== Proposed legislation ==
In 2007, Representative Crispin Beltran filed House Bill 3059, or the proposed Genuine Agrarian Reform Act, in the House of Representatives to address what proponents say are the shortcomings of CARP.

House Bills 114 and 3051 were filed in the House of Representatives in 2017 and endorsed by the Department of Agrarian Reform. The bills aimed to distribute land without the need for beneficiaries to pay amortization.

In 2022, House Bill 1161, or the Free Land Distribution Act, was filed in the House of Representatives by the Makabayan bloc. The bill proposes the distribution of land to poor peasants for free and the transfer of foreign-controlled agricultural corporations to Filipino farmers.

== See also ==
- Land Bank of the Philippines
- Squatting in the Philippines
- Sugar industry of the Philippines
- Agriculture in the Philippines

General:

- Development-induced displacement
- Eminent domain
- Homestead principle
- Land Banking
- Land claim
- Land rights
- Restitution
- Inclosure
