= Danilo Ramos =

Philippine activist and politician (born 1956)

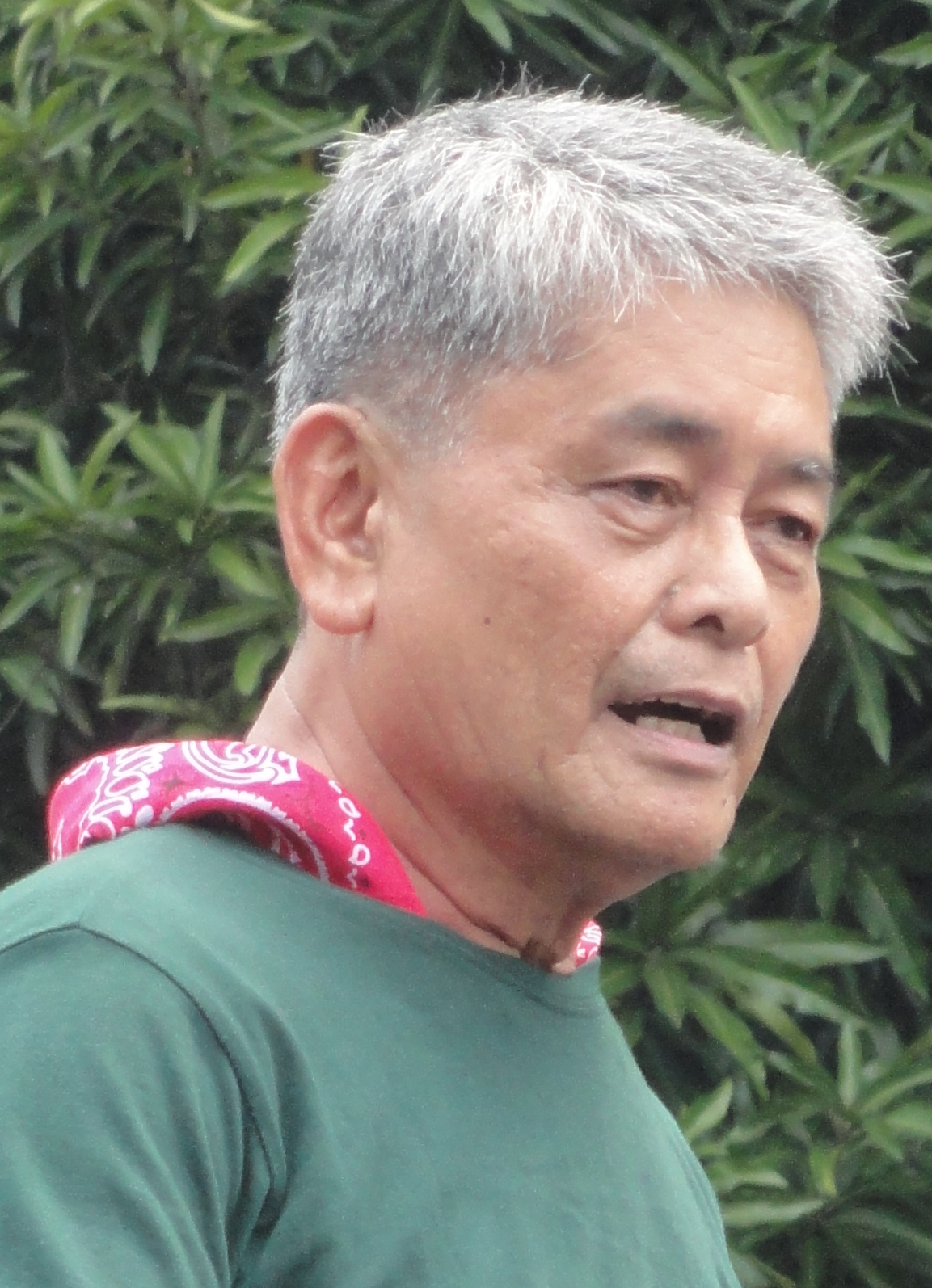
- Ramos at the Senate announcement of Makabayan for the 2025 Philippine general election.

Chairperson of the Kilusang Magbubukid ng Pilipinas
- Incumbent
- Assumed office 2017

Secretary General of the Kilusang Magbubukid ng Pilipinas
- In office 1997–2013

Secretary General of the Alyansa ng Magbubukid sa Gitnang Luzon
- In office 1989–1993

Spokesperson of the Alyansa ng Magbubukid sa Gitnang Luzon
- In office 1988–1988

Secretary General of the Alyansa ng Magbubukid sa Bulacan
- In office 1983–1988

Personal details
- Born: Danilo Ramos; September 17, 1956 (age 69) Malolos, Bulacan, Philippines
- Party: Makabayan
- Other political affiliations: Kilusang Magbubukid ng Pilipinas
- Spouse: Trinidad Marasigan Ramos
- Occupation: Peasant leader, activist
- Profession: Farmer

Danilo "Ka Daning" Hernandez Ramos (born September 27, 1956) is a Filipino peasant activist and poet who is serving as the chairperson of the Kilusang Magbubukid ng Pilipinas (KMP), the largest farmers association in the country. In the 1980s, he actively participated in protests calling for land reform in support of farmers and against the Bataan Nuclear Power Plant. He was among the survivors of the Mendiola massacre in January 1987.

Ramos ran in the 2025 Senate election as part of the Makabayan slate, but failed to secure a seat.

== Early life and education ==
Danilo Ramos was born on September 17, 1956, to farmers Lazaro Ramos, a carpenter and peasant, and Remigia Ramos. Growing up in an impoverished yet devoutly Catholic farming family in Brgy. Dakila, Malolos, Bulacan, Ramos' father died when he was five years old, after which he, as the eldest of two siblings, began helping his mother maintain their livelihood, with most of his childhood spent assisting his extended family in farm work after school. The land that they lived and tilled on was owned by a separate landowner. Ramos attended the Sta. Isabel Elementary School, regularly receiving honors, but his involvement with truant classmates in the sixth grade resulted in him being dropped from the school's honors roll; he wept out of regret at home after the school's awarding ceremony. Although he graduated from his elementary school, Ramos was unable to acquire a high school education due to a lack of funds.

Ramos was active in catechetical activities during his youth as part of the Kristiyanong Kapatiran (Christian Brotherhood) in Sta. Isabel Parish. He said that it was in church that he was first exposed to the social realities in the Philippines. His first rally was when their parish was invited to mobilize against the Bataan Nuclear Power Plant.

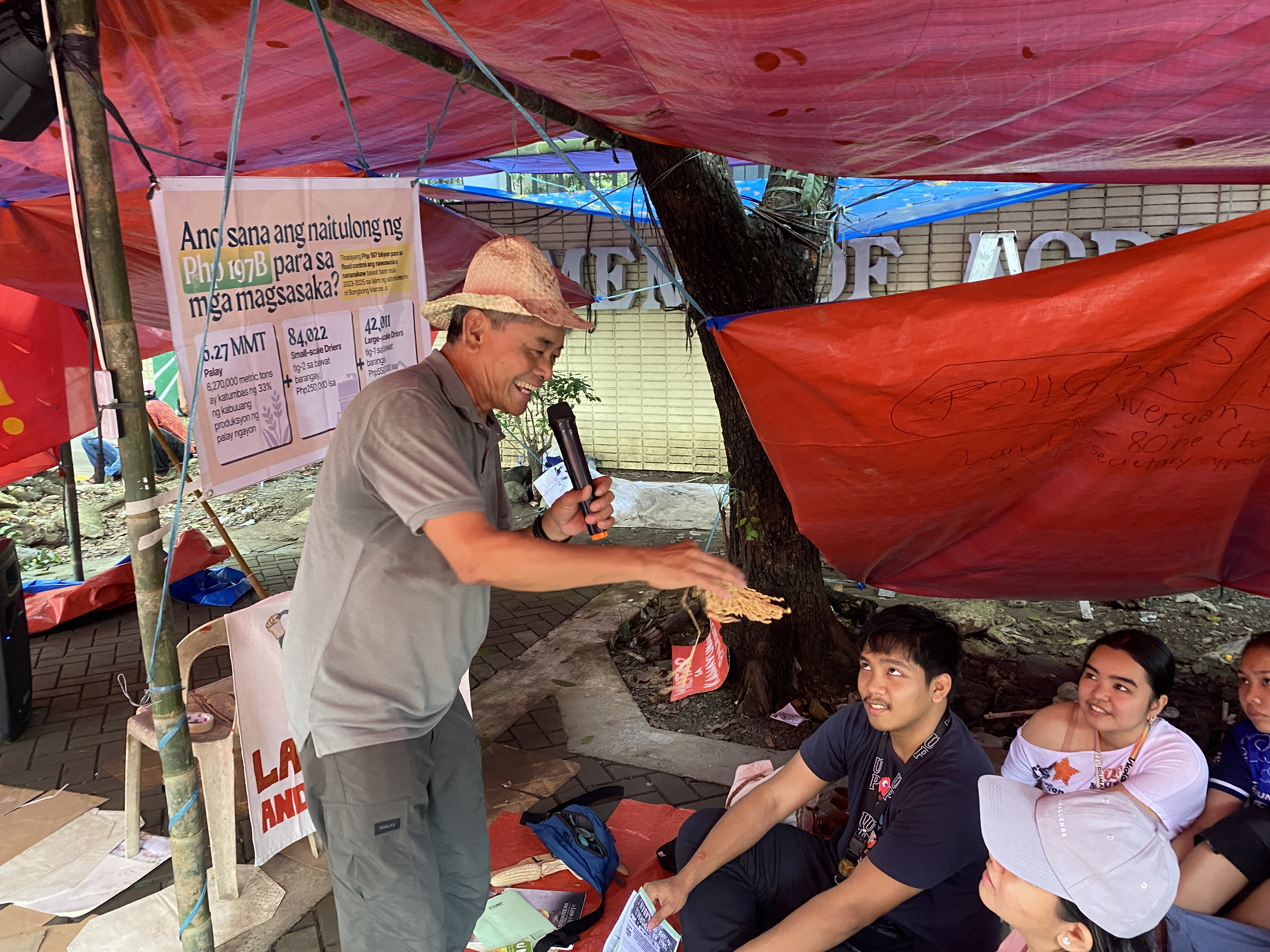
Ramos discussing peasant situationers with youth in a peasant encampment, October 2025.

== Activism ==
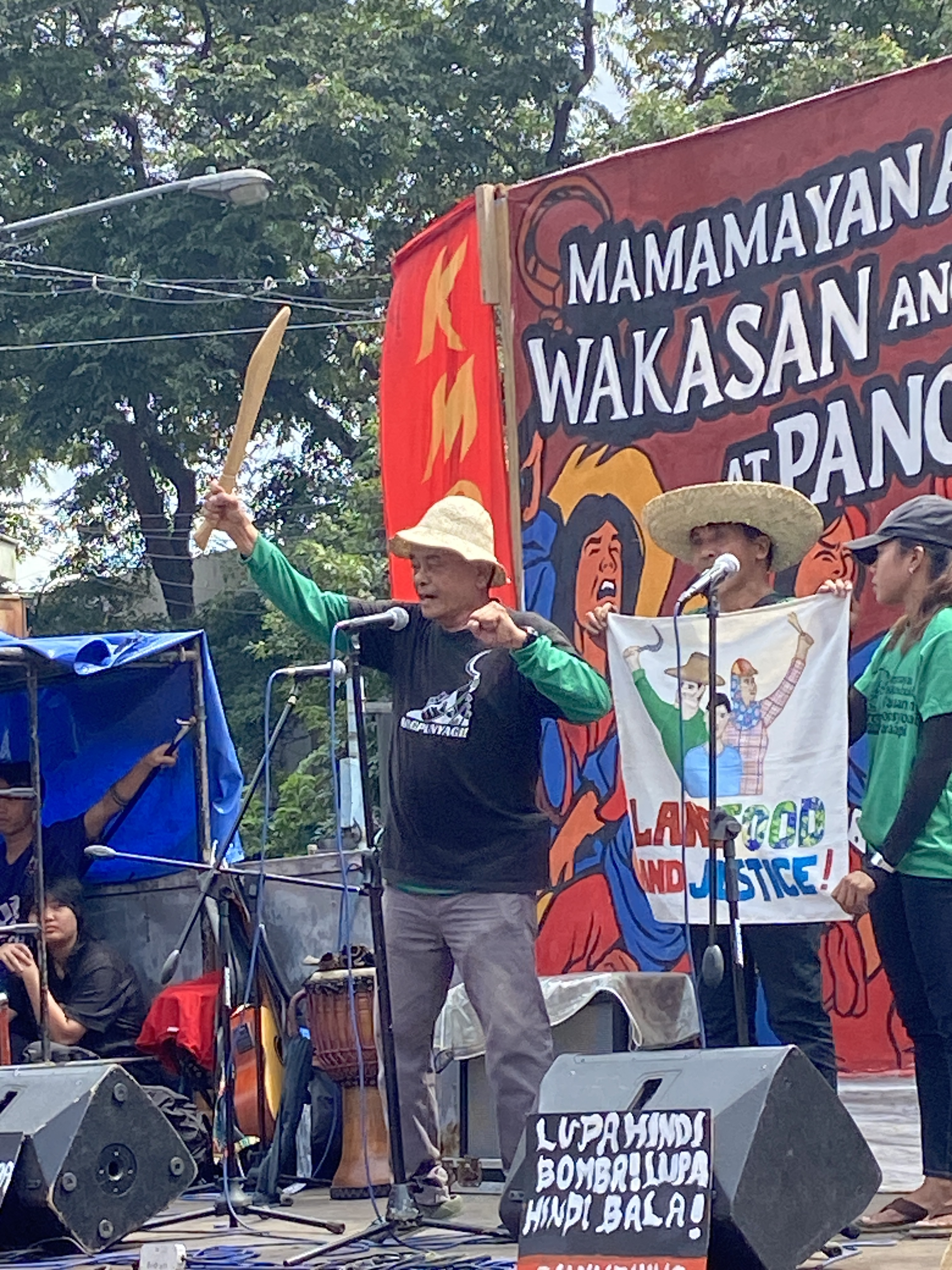
Ramos speaking in front of thousands of peasants in a mobilization at Mendiola, October 2025.

He became part of the Alyansa ng Magbubukid sa Bulacan in 1983 as its secretary-general. He then became the Spokesperson of Alyansa ng Magbubukid sa Gitnang Luzon in 1988 and its secretary-general from 1989 to 1993 He became the secretary-general of the KMP in 1997.

Ramos was a survivor of the Mendiola massacre that occurred in Manila in January 1987.

He has been a victim of other human rights violations, including red-tagging and surveillance by alleged state agents who looked where he lives in Malolos, which KMP said has escalated since 2023. However, Ramos has remained steadfast and outspoken against abuses and incompetencies by the government.

As a progressive-thinking peasant activist, he has also articulated to students and other audiences the relation of urban struggles having rooted in feudalism in the Philippines.

== 2025 Senate bid ==
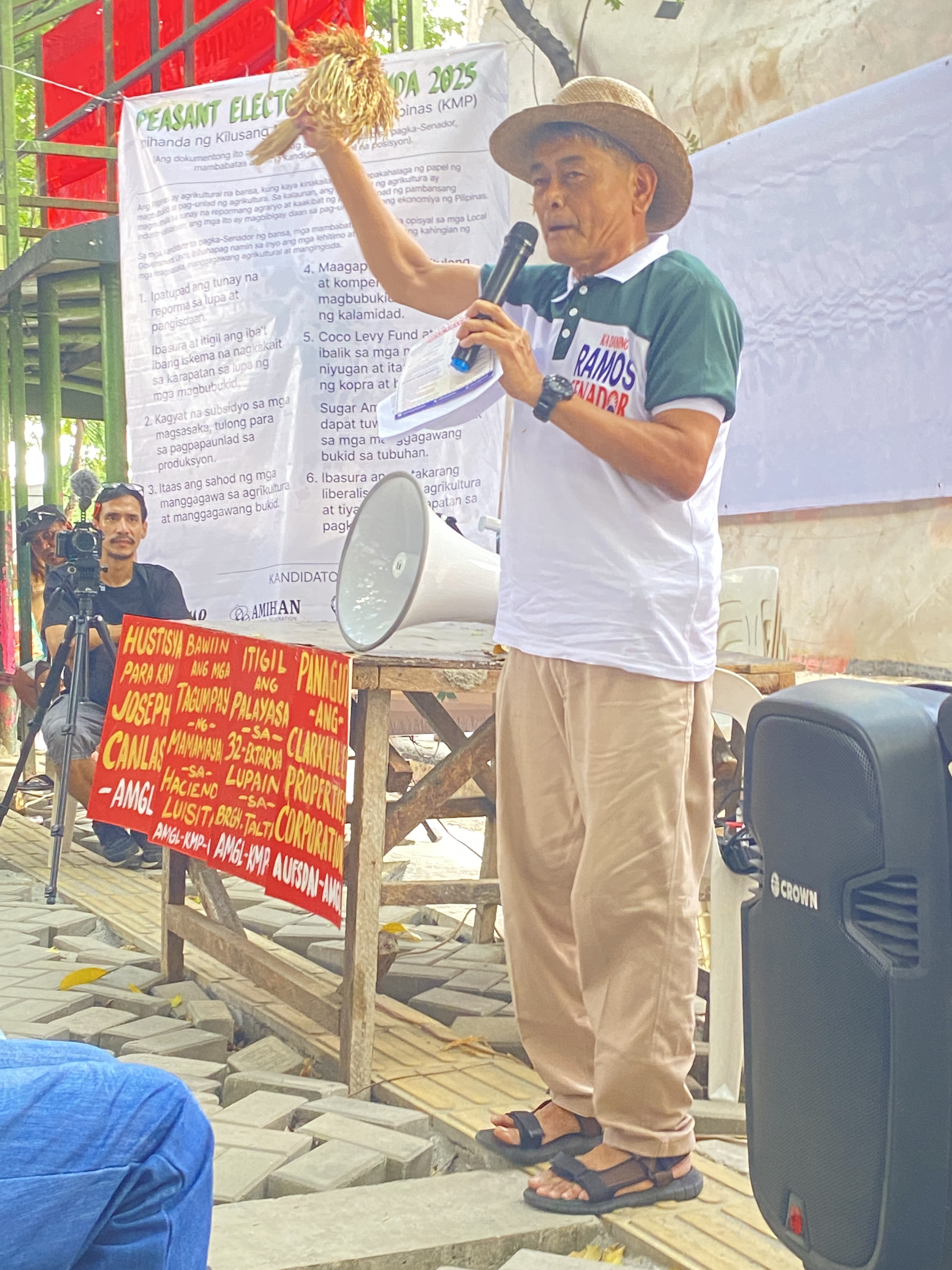
Ramos, speaking in front of Central Luzon farmers who camped out outside the Department of Agrarian Reform

Ramos was revealed as part of Makabayan Senatoriable slate on, August 22, 2024, near their small family farm with fellow farmers. He said that he vows to champion genuine agrarian reform, food self-sufficiency, and strengthening of local food production. He said that it is time 'to plant' a farmer in the Senate. He has challenged the likes of Cynthia Villar with very large landholdings in the Philippines and opposed the Rice Tariffication Law (Republic Act 11203).
