= Kilusang Magbubukid ng Pilipinas =

Labor center in the Philippines

- Peasant Movement of the Philippines
- Abbreviation: KMP
- Successor: Demokratikong Kilusang ng Magbubukid ng Pilipinas (rejectionist)
- Formation: July 24, 1985; 41 years ago
- Type: National democratic mass organization
- Headquarters: Quezon City, Metro Manila, Philippines
- Chairperson: Danilo Ramos
- Website: peasantmovementph.com

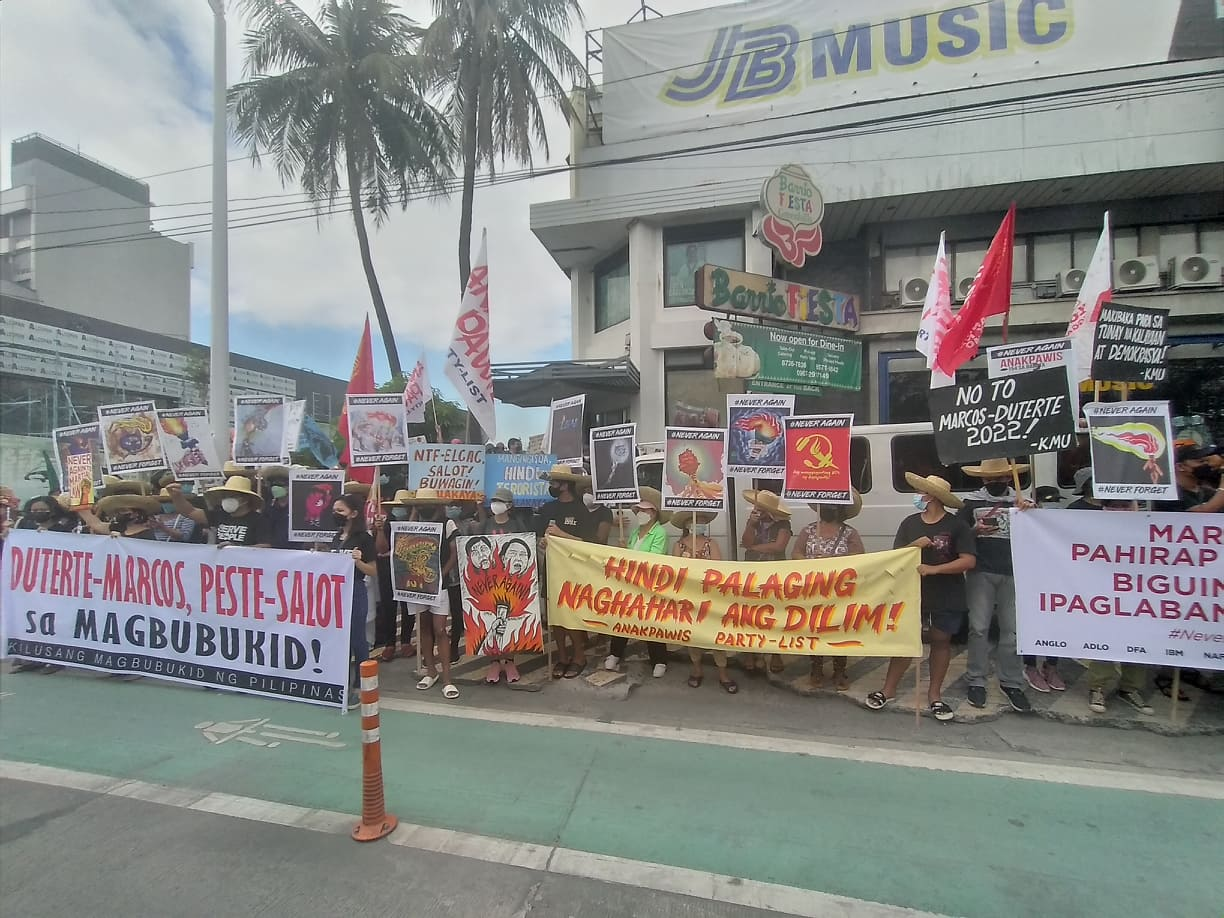
Mobilization during EDSA People Power commemoration, 2022, condemning Marcos and Duterte.

The Kilusang Magbubukid ng Pilipinas or the Peasant Movement of the Philippines, also known by its initials KMP is a national democratic mass organization and a labor center of peasants in the Philippines. The largest group of peasants in the country, it was established on July 24, 1985, in order to unite peasants on the issue of forwarding genuine land reform in the Philippines confronted by centuries-long feudalism and control of landlords and foreign agribusinesses on the Philippine agriculture.

KMP was the main group holding demonstrations for agrarian reform before Malacañang when the Mendiola massacre occurred in January 1987. Danilo "Ka Daning" Ramos, a survivor of the incident, serves as the current national chairperson.

== History ==
On May 10, 1990, three days before the KMP's Third National Congress was held in Quezon City, chairman Jaime Tadeo was arrested by the National Bureau of Investigation (NBI) for charges of estafa; he was later unanimously reelected as KMP chairman at the national congress despite his arrest.

In July 1993, the KMP fractured into two factions after vice chairman Rafael V. Mariano accused chairman Tadeo of committing estafa, later impeaching him from his position by October. Mariano's faction held the Fourth National Congress in November 1993, while Tadeo and his followers established a new organization not aligned with the Communist Party of the Philippines called the Demokratikong Kilusang Magbubukid ng Pilipinas (DKMP) in December 1993.

== Advocacies ==
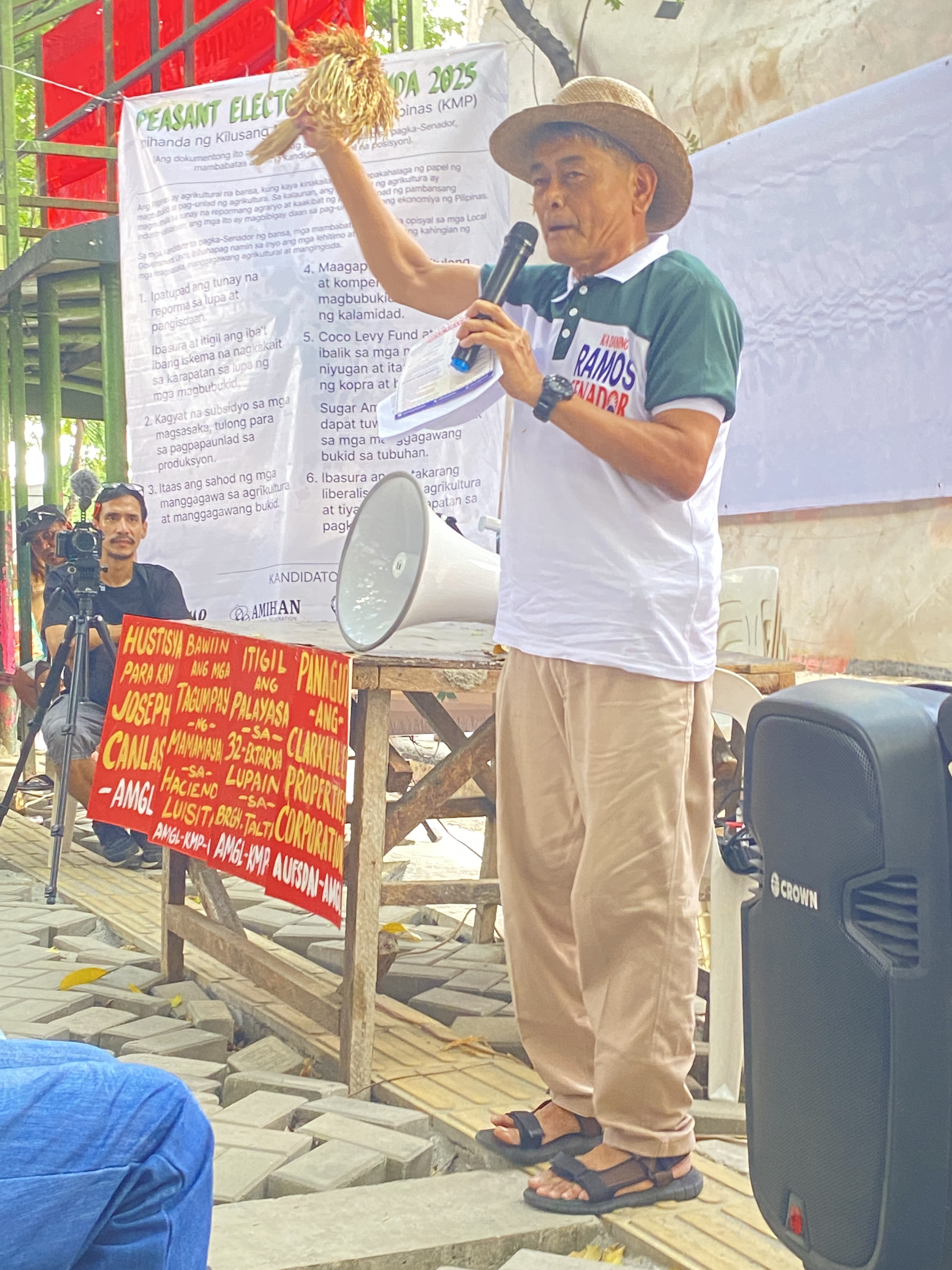
Danilo Ramos speaking before Central Luzon farmers, 2025.

KMP narrates that it has long-exposed alleged bogus land reform programs by the Philippine government while arousing, organizing, and mobilizing the peasant masses supposedly in order to uplift their social conditions and participate in the struggle for national democracy.

Different chapters have launched different programs and actions including bungkalan or collective farming, land activities, campaigns against land grabbing, educational work, and relief during disasters.

== Stance on CARP ==
KMP has long-criticized the government's Comprehensive Agrarian Reform Program (CARP) and its extension program CARP with Extension and Reforms (CARPER), denouncing its what it calls "illusion" of land reform that has allegedly only facilitated land monopoly of land reform. The program has been deemed as market-oriented that relied on market transactions instead of free land distribution. According to government data, farmholdings "fully-owned" decreased by 12% between 1980 and 2012, from 58% to 46%. KMP has also been vigilant on the plan of the government by advocating 100% foreign land ownership through charter change.

KMP, other, peasant advocates, and those in solidarity like Anakpawis Partylist and other Makabayan representatives, have filed what they say are genuine Agrarian Reform Bills (GARB) since 2007 for redistributive agrarian reform.

== List of chairpersons and secretaries general ==
=== Chairperson ===
- Jaime Tadeo (1985–1993)
- Rafael V. Mariano (1993–2017)
- Danilo Ramos (2017–present)

==== Vice chairperson ====
- Rafael V. Mariano (1990–1993)
- Joseph Canlas (2013–2021)
- Lucia Capaducio (2023–present)

=== Secretary general ===
- Rafael V. Mariano (1985–1990)
- Basilio Propongo (1990–)
- Danilo Ramos (1997–2013)
- Antonio Flores (2013–2019)
- Ronnie Manalo (2023–present)

==== Deputy secretary general ====
- Randall Echanis (1999–2020)
- Wilfredo Marbella (2013–)
- Mao Hermitanio (2017–)

== Other prominent members ==
- Ericson Acosta

== See also ==
- AMIHAN
