= Mendiola massacre =

1987 mass killing of political protesters in Manila

Coordinates: 14°36′00″N 120°59′29″E

- Location: Mendiola Street, San Miguel, Manila, Philippines
- Date: January 22, 1987 approximately 4:30 p.m. (UTC +8)
- Target: Demonstration
- Attack type: Shooting
- Weapon: Small arms
- Deaths: 13
- Injuries: 74 (51 demonstrators, 23 state security forces)
- Perpetrator: Philippine state security forces

The Mendiola massacre was an incident that took place on Mendiola Street, San Miguel, Manila, Philippines on January 22, 1987, in which state security forces violently dispersed a farmers' march to Malacañang Palace in protest for the slow pace of government action on land reform.

President Corazon Aquino tasked a constitutional commission to draft the country's new Constitution in 1986, wherein agrarian reform was explicitly mentioned within it. Despite her intentions for agrarian reform, in the first months of her administration, her plans for farmers were hampered by coup attempts by Marcos loyalists, the massive debt incurred by the previous Marcos dictatorship, and the many Marcos cronies who continued to hold onto the vast lands they received under the Marcos decades, which led to possible land reforms being hampered. As tensions rose, the turbulent turn of events sparked rallies and demonstrations taken part by farmers, workers, and students protesting the slow pace of agrarian social justice. State forces in the area opened fire at the protestors, without a shoot order from the President. According to reports of survivors, riot personnel disguised as civilians opened fire on unarmed protesters killing at least 12 and injuring 51 protesters. President Aquino criticized the state forces who shot the protestors without her order. She also acknowledged the tragedy and responded by implementing the Comprehensive Agrarian Reform Program (CARP), and issued several executive and administrative orders to fast-track agrarian reform. Due to the massacre's high profile among the public, Marcos loyalists who were obstructing President Aquino's land reforms were forced not to block legislations concerning agrarian reform.

== Background ==
Corazon Aquino's election to the presidency brought about the prospects of rebuilding the formal institutions of democracy and the fundamentals of the Philippine economy. Conflicts with secessionist groups in Mindanao, ballooning national debts, and severe economic inequality plagued the newly-installed administration.

One such severe manifestation of the economic inequality can be seen in the agrarian problems of the Philippines at that time. Promised land reforms during the Marcos regime failed to bring agrarian justice to the farmers. Instead, Marcos' cronies and oligarchs perpetuated the abuse of farmers and peasants. The newly raised administration acted as a fresh opportunity for minorities to supplicate their respective grievances. The farmers pushed the new government amendments in the agrarian law. However, their representatives were told by Minister Heherson Alvarez to wait for the finalization of the new Philippine Constitution and the new Congress, which made the farmers suspicious of this indecisiveness. Furthermore, the new Congress that would supposedly make the laws that will carry out the reforms was dominated by the landlords.

Aquino's EO 229 failed to address the root of agrarian problems of the country, disappointing the farmers and causing them to protest against the administration.

The Kilusang Magbubukid ng Pilipinas (KMP or Peasant Movement of the Philippines), a militant farmers' group led by Jaime Tadeo, demanded genuine agrarian reform from the Aquino government. On January 15, 1987, KMP members encamped at the Ministry of Agrarian Reform (now the Department of Agrarian Reform) in Diliman, Quezon City. The group presented their problems and demands: give land for free to farmers, end the retention of lands by landlords, and halt the amortizations of land payments. Dialogue between the farmers, represented by Jaime Tadeo, and the government, represented by Agrarian Reform Minister Heherson Alvarez, took place on January 20, 1987. Alvarez promised to bring the matter to the President's attention during the next day's cabinet meeting.

The response of the administration toward the protests, particularly in the Mendiola incident, was a violent dispersal. Whether or not it was a deliberate action or a miscommunicated order, the Mendiola incident showed that there were people who were dissatisfied with the self-preserving oligarchs-legislators who backed Aquino's administration. The violent dispersal became a tipping point for key anti-government groups such as the National Democratic Front (NDF), the main communist coalition at the time to defer from peace talks with the new government, ending hopes for reconciliation for agrarian reforms.

== March to Malacañang ==
On January 22, 1987, the farmers decided to march to Malacañang Palace in order to air their needs instead of having the chance to negotiate with Heherson Alvarez. Marching from the Quezon Memorial Circle, Tadeo's group was joined by members of other militant groups: Kilusang Mayo Uno (May One Movement), Bagong Alyansang Makabayan (New Patriotic Alliance), League of Filipino Students and Kongreso ng Pagkakaisa ng Maralitang Lungsod (Unity Congress of the Urban Poor). At 1:00 in the afternoon, the marchers reached Liwasang Bonifacio and held a brief presentation. At around the same time, anti-riot personnel under the command of Capital Region Command commander Gen. Ramon Montaño, Task Force Nazareno under the command of Col. Cesar Nazareno and police forces under the command of Western Police District Chief Brig. Gen. Alfredo Lim were deployed around the vicinity of Malacañang.

The first line of civil disturbance control units consisted of policemen from the Western Police District. About ten yards behind the policemen were Integrated National Police Field Force units. The third line, a further ten yards from the second police line, consisted of a Philippine Marine Corps unit, the Marine Civil Disturbance Control Battalion. Positioned behind the Marines were army trucks, water cannons, fire trucks and two Mobile Dispersal Teams equipped with tear gas delivery gear.

The marchers numbered 10,000–15,000 by the time they reached Recto Avenue. They clashed with the police, and the police lines were breached. At this point, gunshots were fired, signalling the start of the killings, and the activists disengaged from the melee, retreating towards Recto Avenue. Sporadic gunfire increased amidst the withdrawal. Alfredo Lim, mayor of Manila in 2007, conjectures that the Marines were responsible for the shooting.

== Aftermath ==
The Western Police District, Marines, Special Weapons and Tactics team, and Military, all colluded to barricade the entrance of the Malacañang Palace. They formed multiple lines of defense, but could not make the marching rallyists depart. The second line of defense, composed of the Marines, fired warning shots and threw pillbox and tear gas canisters to the supporters which started an even worse commotion. Twelve marchers were immediately confirmed dead. At least fifty people were injured, six of which were policemen; the victims were taken to different hospitals around the area namely: Far Eastern University Hospital, Philippine General Hospital, Jose Reyes Memorial Medical Center, UST Hospital, Mary Chiles Hospital, Singian, and Ospital ng Maynila.

Death toll rose the next day, reaching eighteen deaths. Injury toll also rose to one hundred one people. As a response to the Mendiola massacre, leaders from the Kilusang Magbubukid ng Pilipinas announced that they will be staging a nationwide protest condemning the mass killing. An estimated 750,000 members and another 2,000,000 familiars were expected to join the said protest. As part of the protest, farmers were instructed to go on a farming strike, barricading major produce routes, and forcibly seizing agricultural inputs such as pesticides and fertilizers from abusive landlords. KMP leader Jaime Tadeo also demanded for the immediate resignation of then Defense Minister Rafael Ileto, Gen. Fidel Ramos, Brig. Gen. Ramon Montano, and Brig. Gen. Alfredo Lim for "they were directly involved in the massacre."

Then exiled dictator Ferdinand Marcos released a statement in Honolulu regarding the mass shooting. In his statement, he showed vexation towards the reaction of the armed forces towards the rallyists. He also then said President Aquino had a private militia known as "The Yellow Army” that was responsible for the massacre because of a lack of attention given to the rallyists before their March.

Gen. Ramon Montano said in an interview that the marchers were to blame for the shooting, as they attempted to break the barricade set up by the armed forces. However, he admitted that the military might have "overreacted" on their response to the protesters, ultimately undermining their part in the tragedy.

Following the incident was the February 4, 1987, letter addressed to President Aquino indicating the desires of most of the Filipinos, especially the poor and the oppressed, which is "bringing about a more progressive and stable foundation for upholding their rights." The KMP emphasizes on the incompetence of the Ministry of Agrarian Reform, which was strongly believed to be the primary reason for the massacre. Lastly, the letter demanded the Aquino government to mend its governance and side with the Filipinos, particularly to the peasants, workers, and the poor in place of only the Filipinos associated with the upper class and foreign lands.

The Citizen's Mendiola Commission (CMC), formed by Aquino to investigate on the incident released its official report on the day of February 27, 1987. The commissioners noted that the rallyers did not secure a permit; the members of crowd-disturbance units were armed with pistols and armalites; armed soldiers in civilian clothing were among the crowd; some of the demonstrators carried weapons; and Jaime Tadeo, KMP's leader, uttered words that incited sedition. However, the commission failed to identify who fired on the marchers and recommended further investigation by the National Bureau of Investigation (NBI). Overall, the findings were not conclusive as to who should be held responsible for the killings. On February 28, 1987, upon completion of the investigations regarding the Mendiola massacre, the Citizens Mendiola Commission suggested to President Aquino to file sedition charges to Tadeo.

=== Immediate consequences of the protest ===
In protest over the massacre, the Chairman and Vice-Chairman of the Presidential Committee on Human Rights, José W. Diokno and J.B.L. Reyes, resigned from the government. Moreover, other members of the Presidential Committee on Human Rights asked for the resignation of Defense Minister Ileto and Gen. Fidel V. Ramos for their alleged complicity in the Mendiola massacre.

Crispin Beltran, leader of Kilusang Mayo Uno, spoke on behalf of the protesters when he stated that they wanted no more bloodshed: "We shall return tomorrow with no weapons, but armed with courage and determination to seek justice for our slain comrades." True enough, the number of protesters near the Malacanang Palace increased, from the initial 10,000 to over 15,000 and growing. As a result of the increased dialogue between the government and the rallyists, more protests and the number of protesters increased, and not just at the site of the Mendiola Bridge and the Malacanang Palace. In Pampanga, an estimated 2,000 protesters barricaded highways, including the highway linking Eastern Pampanga and San Fernando, and the highway linking Porac and Angeles City. Talks regarding the agrarian reforms were shortly suspended because both sides failed to reach a common agenda, due to the real threat to the members of both panels at the time (pertaining to the rebels and insurgents against the Aquino administration at the time).

On another note, the National Union of Students of the Philippines (NUSP) challenged President Aquino to sign an executive order carrying out a minimum program of land reform presented to her by the Kilusang Magbubukid. Aside from the challenge of the NUSP, KMP Chairman Jaime Tadeo said that the Aquinos should distribute their 6,000 hectare (14,600 acre) estate in Central Luzon as a model for land reform. In response to this, President Aquino was reportedly prepared to distribute at least parts of Hacienda Luisita, and the Aquino sugar plantation as part of the supposed land reform program, but never did so. In order to improve relations with the protesters, (including the groups Kilusang Magbubukid ng Pilipinas, Kilusang Mayo Uno, the August Twenty-One Movement, and the Bagong Alyansang Makabayan) President Aquino allowed the protesters to cross the Mendiola Bridge and march towards Malacañang Palace.

=== Government legislation as response ===
As a response to the incident, in 1987, the Aquino Government implemented a Comprehensive Agrarian Reform Program (CARP). It was passed as "an agriculturally-based, economically-driven" reform. This reform applied to all types of agricultural land, both public and private, regardless of tenure arrangement and crops produced. It aimed to redistribute 9,773,870 ha of land to 3,713,110 beneficiaries. CARP experienced slow implementation due to troubles with landowner-tenant negotiations, the land evaluation processes of the time, the lack of guidelines for landowner compensation, and the lack of institutional coordination between agrarian administrative agencies. Many of these issues were resolved later on, but troubles with private landowners who were against the distribution of lands to peasant farmers were still rampant.

President Aquino's government issued numerous executive orders, a proclamation order, and backed a republic act regarding agrarian land reform and social justice.

- Executive Order No. 228, July 16, 1987 – Declared full ownership to qualified farmer-beneficiaries covered by PD 27. It also determined the value remaining unvalued rice and corn lands subject of PD 27 and provided for the manner of payment by the FBs and mode of compensation to landowners.
- Executive Order No. 229, July 22, 1987 – Provided mechanism for the implementation of the Comprehensive Agrarian Reform Program (CARP).
- Proclamation No. 131, July 22, 1987 – Instituted the CARP as a major program of the government. It provided for a special fund known as the Agrarian Reform Fund (ARF), with an initial amount of Php50 billion to cover the estimated cost of the program from 1987-1992.
- Executive Order No. 129-A, July 26, 1987 – streamlined and expanded the power and operations of the DAR.
- Republic Act No. 6657, June 10, 1988 (Comprehensive Agrarian Reform Law) – An act which became effective June 15, 1988 and instituted a comprehensive agrarian reform program to promote social justice and industrialization providing the mechanism for its implementation and for other purposes. This law is still the one being implemented at present.
- Executive Order No. 405, June 14, 1990 – Vested in the Land Bank of the Philippines the responsibility to determine land valuation and compensation for all lands covered by CARP.
- Executive Order No. 407, June 14, 1990 – Accelerated the acquisition and distribution of agricultural lands, pasture lands, fishponds, agro-forestry lands and other lands of the public domain suitable for agriculture.

==== Reception of CARP ====
Because of the problems in the implementation of CARP, public faith in government credibility and its capability to undertake reforms diminished.

The farmers' response to this legislation was also critical. They asserted that the legislation goes against the democratic process of land ownership and protects landlord interests. They also state that, having been passed long after public rage and condemnation followed the government during the Mendiola Massacre, it was passed as a counter-insurgency measure, instead of for genuine social justice.

Mendiola Peace Arch

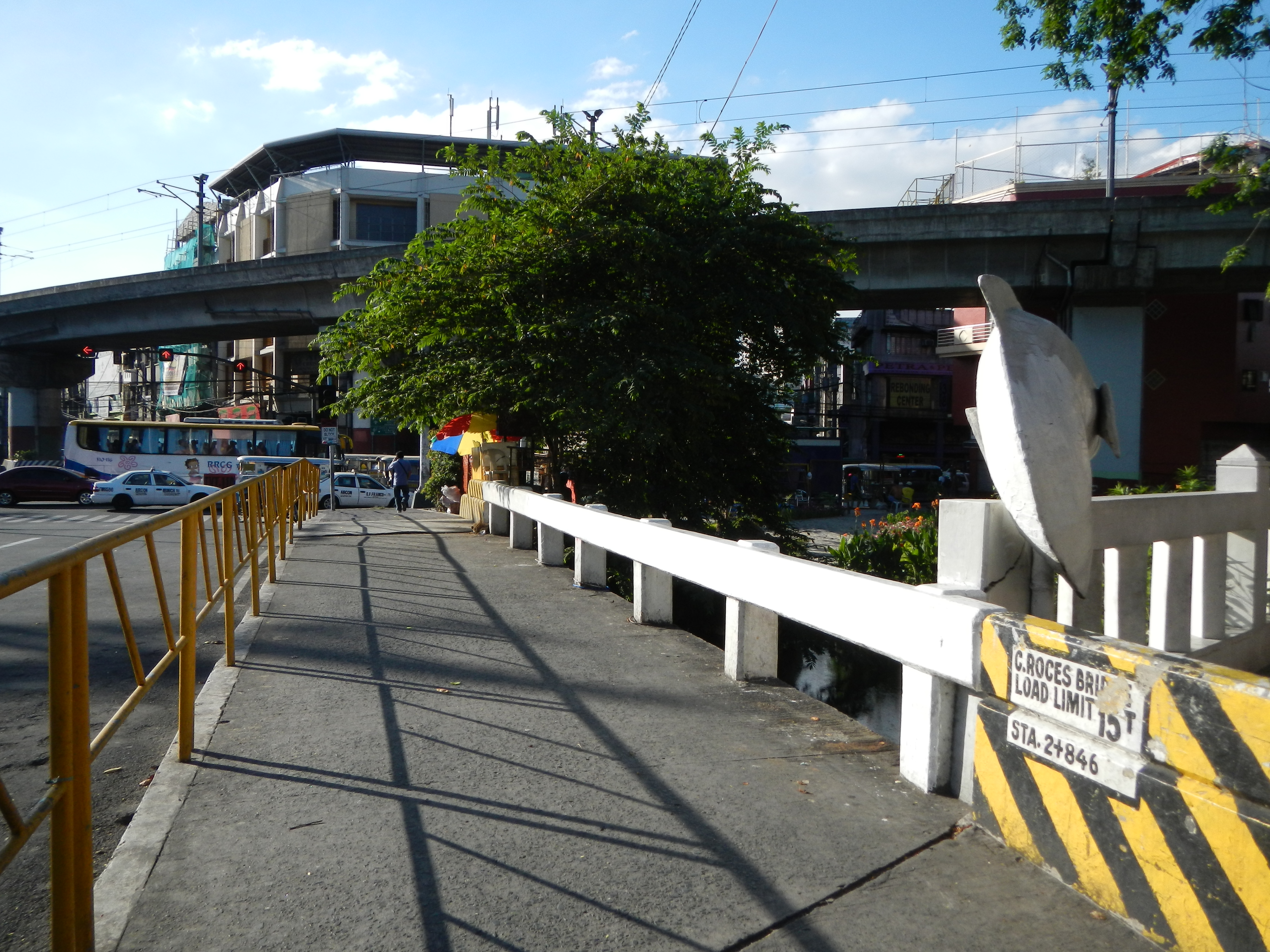
Chino Roces Bridge

=== Eventual consequences ===
In 1988, the Manila Regional Trial Court issued a decision to dismiss a P6.5-million class suit filed by relatives of the victims. This decision was upheld by the Supreme Court in 1993.

In 2007, members of the Kilusang Magbubukid ng Pilipinas installed a granite marker at the Bantayog ng mga Bayani in Quezon City, commemorating the 20th anniversary of the incident.

The government disallowed the conduct of demonstrations at Mendiola. However, in January 2008, Mayor Alfredo Lim allowed rallies at the landmark, as long as they were held on weekends and holidays.

== Reactions ==
=== From key political figures ===
José W. Diokno, the Chairman of the Presidential Committee on Human Rights, now the Commission on Human Rights resigned in disgust, which his daughter national historian Maris Diokno said was the only time he was seen to be "near tears". Atty. Diokno died soon after the event and according to National Artist F. Sionil José, Aquino had blocked all the attending farmers to Diokno's memorial service which made José leave weeping in shock.

=== In media and the arts ===
In late 1990, playwright and filmmaker Lito Tiongson directed a short film on 16 mm titled Isang Munting Lupa that is based on the 1961 short story "Tata Selo" by Roger Sikat but set before and during the Mendiola massacre. It stars Ray Ventura, Beth Mondragon, Joel Lamangan, Rody Vera, Nanding Josef and Bon Vibar.

== See also ==
- Fight for Us (or Orapronobis), a 1989 film about disillusionment with the Aquino administration caused by government-supported killings
- 1987 in Philippines
- List of massacres in the Philippines
- Escalante massacre
- 1986 EDSA Revolution
