= Comprehensive Agrarian Reform Program =

Philippine government policy

The Comprehensive Agrarian Reform Program, more commonly known as CARP, is a land reform effort of the Philippines whose legal basis is the Republic Act No. 6657, otherwise known as the Comprehensive Agrarian Reform Law (CARL), signed under the administration of President Cory Aquino. It is the redistribution of private and public agricultural lands to help the beneficiaries survive as small independent farmers, regardless of the “tenurial” arrangement. Its goals are to provide landowners equality in terms of income and opportunities, empower land owner beneficiaries to have equitable land ownership, enhance agricultural production and productivity, provide employment to more agricultural workers, and put an end to conflicts regarding land ownership.

== Background ==
The agrarian reform is part of the long history of attempts of land reform in the Philippines. The law was outlined by former President Corazon C. Aquino through Presidential Proclamation 131 and Executive Order 229 on June 22, 1987, and it was enacted by the 8th Congress of the Philippines and signed by Aquino on June 10, 1988. In 1998, which was the year that it was scheduled to be completed, the Congress enacted Republic Act No. 8532 to allocate additional funds for the program and extending the automatic appropriation of ill-gotten wealth recovered by the Presidential Commission on Good Government (PCGG) for CARP until the year 2008.

An amendatory law, CARPER or the Comprehensive Agrarian Reform Program Extension with Reforms or the Republic Act. 9700 was passed. It extended the deadline of distributing agricultural lands to the farmers for an additional five years. This law also amends other provisions and regulations formerly stated in the CARP. It was signed into law on August 7, 2009, and was set to be accomplished by the year 2014.

== Key components ==
The implementation of the Comprehensive Agrarian Reform Program relies heavily on the Department of Agrarian Reform (DAR). As the lead implementing agency, the DAR has the responsibility in carrying out the principal aspects of the program, which are Land Tenure Improvement (LTI), Program Beneficiary Development (PBD), and the Agrarian Justice Delivery (AJD).

The Land Tenure Improvement is highly recognized as the most integral aspect of the program. This component seeks to secure the tenurial status of the farmers and farmworkers. The DAR implements this component through Land Acquisition and Distribution (LAD) or Non-land Transfer Schemes.

The Land Acquisition and Distribution involves the redistribution of private and government-owned land to landless farmers and farm workers. Under Section 6 of RA 9700 ( Section 16 of RA 6657 as amended) regarding Land Acquisition, the DAR identifies lands that are eligible for distribution under the CARP with accordance to the law, acquires the land by delivering a notice containing the offer with its corresponding value to the owner should he choose to accept the payment. Following the acquisition of lands under Section 11 of RA 9700(Section 26 of RA 6657 as amended) the DAR distributes these to the qualified beneficiaries, who then pay for the land through the Land Bank of the Philippines or directly to their former owners.

Under the CARP, a total target of 10.3 million hectares of land was programmed to be distributed over a span of ten years. Out of the total land, 6.5 million hectares of public disposal lands and Integrated Social Forestry areas are to be distributed by the Department of Environment and Natural Resources (DENR) while 3.8 million hectares of private agricultural lands are to be distributed by the DAR. From July 1987 to June 1992, the DAR was able to distribute 1.77 million hectares benefiting .933 million beneficiaries, while the DENR has distributed 1.88 million hectares to .760 million farmers.

Leasehold Operations is the alternative non-land transfer scheme that covers all tenanted agricultural lands in retained areas and in yet to be acquired or distributed lands. Under this component, the DAR mediates between the landowners and tenants so that their share tenancy arrangement could be turned into a leasehold agreement, whereby the beneficiaries will pay a fixed fee based on their own historical production records instead of paying a large percentage share of their produce to the landowner.

The Program Beneficiaries Development is a support service delivery component of CARP. It aims to aid the agrarian reform beneficiaries by providing them necessary support services to make their lands more productive, and enable them to venture in income generating livelihood projects in accordance to Section 14 of RA 9700(Section 37 of RA 6657 as amended) . Under the support service delivery programs, the Presidential Agrarian Reform Council(PARC) ensures that agrarian reform beneficiaries are provided with support services such as land surveys and tilting, construction of infrastructures, marketing and production assistance, credit and training.

Agrarian Justice Delivery provides agrarian legal assistance and oversees the adjudication of cases. Under Section 19 of RA 97600 (Section 50 of RA 6657 as amended), the DAR is hereby vested with the primary jurisdiction to determine and adjudicate agrarian reform matters and shall have exclusive original jurisdiction over all matters involving the implementation of agrarian reform except those falling under the exclusive jurisdiction of the Department of Agriculture (DA) and the Department of Environment and Natural Resources (DENR).

The Agrarian Legal Assistance is under the Bureau of Legal Assistance (BALA). The BALA provides legal assistance to the beneficiaries affected by agrarian cases, particularly those whose legal rights as ARB's are challenged by landowners.

The Adjudication of Cases involves the adjudication of cases by the Department of Agrarian Reform Adjudication Board (DARAB). The adjudication of cases deals with disputes pertaining to tenancy relations; valuation of lands acquired by DAR under compulsory acquisition mode; rights and obligations of persons, whether natural or juridical, engaged in the management cultivation and use of all agricultural lands; ejectment and dispossession of tenants/leaseholders; review of leasehold rentals; and other similar disputes.

== Development ==
At the end of the 20th century, the population of the Philippines increased rapidly to 75.32 million in a country of 297,410 square kilometers, with an average family size of six, making the Philippines known for high population density. In addition to this, with a population growth of 2.02 per year, the Philippine population is expected to double in the span of 25 years. 60 percent of the Philippine population is rural, and over 12 million Filipinos make a living directly from agricultural cultivation. Around 9.5 million hectares of land across the Philippines are used to plan various crops. In terms of landlessness, the number of landless agricultural families rose up from 5 million to 11.32 million families. Out of these 11.32 families, 4.6 million make a living from lands they don't own. 0.70 million are rented, 2 million are laborers, while 1.9 million are farming as tenants.

=== Land reform under Aquino administration (1986–1992) ===
During the start of President Corazon Aquino's term in 1986, the Constitutional Commission approved Section 21 under Article II, which states that “The State shall promote comprehensive rural development and agrarian reform.” This led to the drafting of CARP, which took the Congress a year to make. On June 10, 1988, Republic Act No. 6657, also known as the Comprehensive Agrarian Reform Law (CARL), was passed to promote social justice and industrialization. Although it was still a product of adherence to democratic principles, this law was found to have many flaws. Because of much dissatisfaction with the agrarian reform law, proposals from peasant groups and non-government organizations grew in order to implement an alternative program that was more advantageous to them. However, this did not succeed.

CARP recognizes not only farmers but all landless workers as beneficiaries with the condition that they cultivate the land. The two main departments in charge of this program are Department of Agrarian Reform (DAR) and Department of Environment and Natural Resources (DENR). Aside from the land distribution, it also provides the delivery of support services and security to the farmers.

Under the Aquino administration, a total of 898,420 landless tenants and farmers became recipients of land titles and support services. Even with this, it can be considered unsuccessful because it only accomplished 22.5 percent of land distribution in 6 years. This was due to the fact that Aquino assigned 4 different DAR secretaries. The major setback for CARP was Aquino's Hacienda Luisita's Stock Distribution Option, which says that she was the first landlord to evade CARP on a grand scale.

=== Land reform under Ramos administration (1992–1998) ===
The policies on agrarian reform under the Ramos administration focused on accelerating the direct land transfer and non-land transfer through adopting more rational, fair and inexpensive settlements. It encouraged landowners to invest in rural-based industries that are connected to agriculture. It made an amendment to Section 63 of CARL to increase the fund of this project to 100 billion. Salaries of workers and members of DAR board were increased to motivate them for more successful results as well.

The target land to be given to farmer beneficiaries under this Administration was 3.4 million hectares, 4.7 million or 60 percent of which was successfully distributed. It achieved more than double the output of the Aquino administration. It focused on “less contentious landholdings and acquisition modes,” where they chose to work with autonomous NGOs and peasant organizations. However, controversies were unavoidable as they encountered landlords openly harassing peasants with guns and forcing them out of the lands.

=== Land reform under Estrada administration (1998–2001) ===
This administration focused on fast tracking land acquisition and distribution. It wanted to reduce uncertainties in land market in rural places to help farmers’ efficiency and private investment to grow. It encouraged joint ventures, corporative, contact farming and other marketing arrangements to protect the status of stakeholders and promotion of agri-industrialization. They also improved the databases of the implementing agencies of DAR and DENR to fully record and update the lands covered. Estrada highlighted that there was a need to conceptualize new approaches in doing things to build a new social agreement where producers, government and private sectors work with a common goal.

The program encountered some problems such as strong landowners' resistance. Tenants also complained on the limited amount of fund allocation provided by the government for the project. It aimed to complete 7.8 million hectares by 2004. Since President Estrada lasted only 2.5 years as president, the total beneficiaries of CARP was only 0.18 million or 10 percent.

== Comprehensive Agrarian Reform Program Extension with Reforms (CARPER) ==
Comprehensive Agrarian Reform Program Extension with Reforms, known also as CARPER or CARPer, (Republic Act 9700) is the amendatory law that extends again the deadline of distributing agricultural lands to farmers for five years. It also amends other provisions stated in CARP.

In December 2008, the budget for CARP expired and there remained 1.2 million hectares of agricultural land waiting to be acquired and distributed to farmers. CARPER was signed into law on August 7, 2009, by Gloria Macapagal Arroyo and was set to expire on June 30, 2014. However the program of distributing lands to farmer-beneficiaries continued even after June 2014. Section 30 of RA 9700 or CARPER law states that cases on the matter which are still pending "shall be allowed to proceed to its finality and be executed even beyond such date."

=== Beneficiaries ===
Beneficiaries of CARPER are landless farmers, including agricultural lessees, tenants, as well as regular, seasonal and other farmworkers. In a certain landholding, the qualified beneficiaries who are tenants and regular farmworkers will receive 3 hectares each before distributing the remaining land to the other qualified beneficiaries like seasonal farmworks and other farmworkers (Section 22 of CARL). The Department of Agrarian Reform (DAR) identifies and screens potential beneficiaries and validates their qualifications. Beneficiaries must be least 15 years old, be a resident of the barangay where the land holding is located, and own no more than 3 hectares of agricultural land.

The CARPER law has bias for organized farmers to be beneficiaries because the Congress believes that the success rate of organized farmers is high and can make their awarded lands productive.

=== Significant provisions ===
- Gender-Sensitive Agrarian Reform – Section 1 of the CARPER law states that "The State shall recognize and enforce, consistent with existing laws, the rights of rural women to own and control land, taking into consideration the substantive equality between men and women as qualified beneficiaries, to receive a just share of the fruits thereof, and to be represented in advisory or appropriate decision-making bodies. These rights shall be independent of their male relatives and of their civil status." Rural women will have a representative in the highest policy making body of DAR – the Presidential Agrarian Reform Council (PARC).
- Budget – Section 21 amending Section 63 for CARL state that the budget allocated for the 5-year extension is 150 Billion pesos which will be sourced from three funds: Agrarian Reform Fund, General Appropriations Acts (GAA) and other sources of funding like privatization of government asset, foreign donors, etc. This budget is the largest per year in the history of CARP.
- Creation of a Congressional Oversight Committee – Section 26 of the CARPER law created a joint Congressional Oversight Committee to oversee and monitor the implementation of the act, which will be composed of the Chairpersons of the Committee on Agrarian Reform of both Houses of Congress, three Members of the House of Representatives, and three Members of the Senate of the Philippines, to be designated respectively by the Speaker of the House of Representatives and the President of the Senate of the Philippines. The chairpersons of the COCAR are the Chairpersons of the Committees on Agrarian Reform of the House of Representatives and of the Senate of the Philippines. The term of the COCAR will end six months after the expiration of the extended period of five years. The COCAR is provided with twenty-five million pesos (P25,000,000.00) every year.
- CARPER as a Continuing Program – Section 30 of the CARPER law mandates that “any case and/or proceeding involving the implementation of the provisions of Republic Act No. 6657, as amended, which may remain pending on June 30, 2014 shall be allowed to proceed to its finality and be executed even beyond such date". Section 30 of CARPER law provides a way to legally continue the implementation of pending CARP cases after the 5-year extension by filling the initiatory process of CARP.
- Policies in Converting Agricultural Lands – Section 73 of the CARPER law: "Any conversion by any landowner of his/her agricultural land into any non-agricultural use with intent to avoid the application of this Act to his/her landholdings and to dispossess his/her bonafide tenant farmers." Failure to comply will result in an imprisonment of 6 to 12 years and/or a penalty of 200,000 pesos to 1 million pesos. The CARPER law prohibits any conversion of irrigated and irrigable lands and mandates the National Irrigation Administration to identify these. CARPER law also states that non-implementation of the conversion plan will result to automatic coverage of the subject by CARP....

=== Achievements ===
In 2003, 15 years into the program, studies funded by the United Nations Development Programme, Asian Development Bank, Food and Agriculture Organization, European Union, and the Philippine Government had shown that poverty incidence among program beneficiaries declined from 47.6 to 45.2 percent, while increasing among their non-participating counterparts from 55.1 to 56.4 percent.

The Official Gazette released an update on the accomplishments in the field of agrarian reform as of June 30, 2014.

"As of December 31, 2013, the government has acquired and distributed 6.9 million hectares of land, equivalent to 88% of the total land subject to CARP." Of this area, the Aquino administration has distributed a total of 751,514 hectares, or 45% of the total landholdings to be distributed to the farmer beneficiaries left under this administration. From this, DAR has distributed 412,782 hectares and DENR has already distributed 338,732 hectares.

In 2014 – 2016, Department of Agrarian Reform still needs to acquire 771,795 hectares (187,686 hectares in 2014; 198,631 hectares in 2015; and 385,478 hectares in 2016). The Department of Environment and Nation Resources still needs to acquire 134,857 hectares — a total of 906,652 hectares.

== See also ==
- Land reform in the Philippines
- Department of Agrarian Reform

== Sources ==
- Guardian, Edgar A. (2003). "Impact of access to land on food security and poverty: the case of Philippine agrarian reform". Land Reform, Land Settlement and Cooperatives (2). FAO.
- Leones, Susana Evangelista; Moreno, Frede G. (2012). "Agrarian Reform and Philippine Political Development". Political Economy: International Political Economy: 1–17. CiteSeerX 10.1.1.1000.3177. doi:10.2139/ssrn.1967844. S2CID 26834718.
- Philippine Star, Ding Cervantes. "After 26 years, CARP ends". philstar.com.
