= Department of Agrarian Reform =

Executive department of the Philippine government

- Kagawaran ng Repormang Pansakahan

- Flag of the department

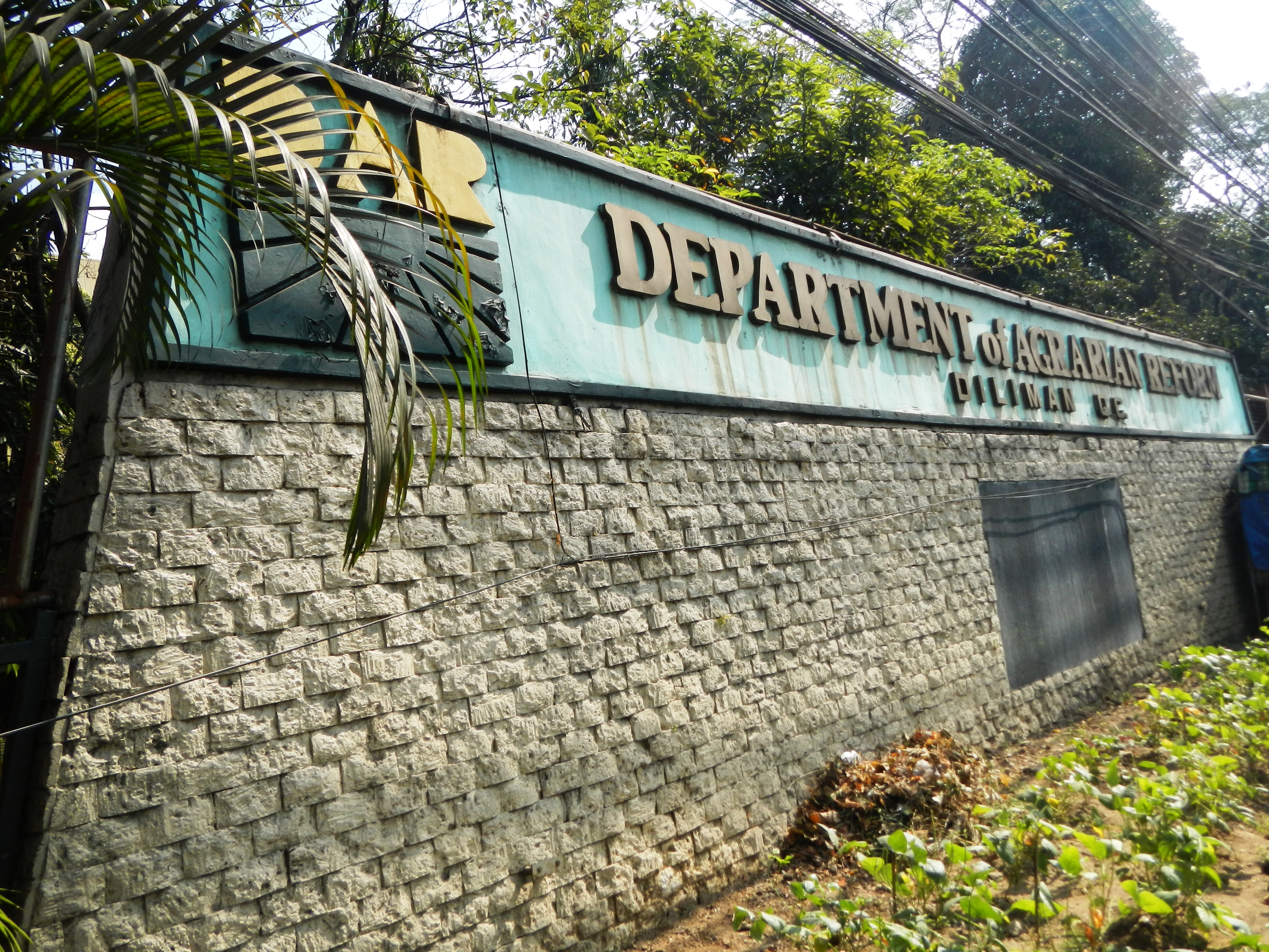
- Department of Agrarian Reform headquarters

Department overview
- Formed: September 10, 1971; 55 years ago
- Headquarters: Elliptical Road, Diliman, Quezon City
- Employees: 8,471 (2026)
- Annual budget: ₱16.85 billion (2026)
- Department executive: Conrado Estrella III, Secretary
- Website: www.dar.gov.ph

The Department of Agrarian Reform (DAR; Filipino: Kagawaran ng Repormang Pansakahan) is an executive department of the Philippine government responsible for the redistribution of agrarian land in the Philippines. The secretary of agrarian reform is the head of DAR.

== Organizational structure ==
The department is currently headed by a secretary with the following undersecretaries and assistant secretaries:

- Undersecretary for Field Operations
- Undersecretary for External Affairs and Communications Operations
- Undersecretary for Support Services
- Undersecretary for Finance, Management and Administration
- Undersecretary for Policy, Planning and Research
- Undersecretary for Legal Affairs
- Undersecretary for Foreign Assisted and Special Projects
- Undersecretary for Special Concerns
- Undersecretary for Mindanao Affairs and Rural Development
- Assistant Secretary for Field Operations
- Assistant Secretary for Legal Affairs in Agrarian Law Implementation and Agrarian Legal Assistance (ALI-ALA)
- Assistant Secretary for Support Services
- Assistant Secretary for Finance, Management and Administration
- Assistant Secretary for Foreign Assisted and Special Projects
- Assistant Secretary for Policy, Planning and Research
- Assistant Secretary for Legal Affairs as an Ex-Officio Member of the DARAB in Adjudication of Agrarian Reform Cases (AARC)
- Assistant Secretary for Finance, Management and Administration - Human Resource and Information Systems Management (HRISM)
- Assistant Secretary for Special Projects under the Foreign Assisted and Special Projects Office (FASPO)

== Bureaus ==
- Bureau of Agrarian Reform Legal Assistance
- Bureau of Agrarian Reform Beneficiaries Development
- Bureau of Land Tenure Improvement
- Bureau of Land Development
- Bureau of Agrarian Reform Information Education
