= Gerry Ortega =

Filipino journalist and politician (1963–2011)

Gerardo Ortega

Project Director of Bantay Kalikasan-Palawan
- In office 2004–2011

Member of the Palawan Provincial Board
- In office June 30, 2001 – June 30, 2004

Director of the Crocodile Farming Institute
- In office 1989–2001

Personal details
- Born: August 28, 1963 Palawan
- Died: January 24, 2011 (aged 47) Barangay San Pedro, Puerto Princesa, Palawan
- Party: PDP–Laban
- Spouse(s): Patria Gloria "Patty"; Innocencio - Ortega
- Relations: Rafael “Totoy" Ortega (father; deceased)
- Children: 5
- Education: Gregorio Araneta University Foundation
- Occupation: Environmental activist, journalist, politician
- Profession: Doctor of Veterinary Medicine

Gerardo Valeriano Ortega DVM (August 28, 1963 – January 24, 2011), better known simply as "Doc Gerry" or "Ka Gerry," was a Filipino journalist, veterinarian, politician, environmental activist, and community organizer best known for his work to promote crocodile farming in the Philippines and for his advocacy against mining on the island of Palawan. Ortega has often been lauded as a hero of the Philippine Environment since his assassination on January 24, 2011, due to his anti-mining and anti-corruption advocacy.

== Personal life and education ==
Ortega was born on August 28, 1963, to Rafael "Totoy" Ortega, who was the municipal mayor of Aborlan, in the island province of Palawan. Gerry Ortega earned his Doctor of Veterinary Medicine degree from the Gregorio Araneta University Foundation near Manila. In 1988, he married Patria Gloria "Patty" Innocencio in a church wedding in Bulacan. They later had five children. The eldest, Mika Ortega, worked as an Information, education, and communication officer of ABS-CBN Foundation's Kapit Bisig para sa Ilog Pasig.

Ortega was a devout Roman Catholic and was one of the local leaders of the Catholic group, Couples for Christ, in Palawan.

== Crocodile farming pioneer (1988–2001) ==
In 1988, Ortega began working at the Crocodile Farming Institute (since renamed the Palawan Wildlife Rescue and Rehabilitation Center but still known widely and referred to below as the Crocodile Farm or CFI) in Irawan, Puerto Princesa, Palawan. In 1989, he became the institute's director.

At the time, many thought the Crocodile Farm project, which was run by the Department of Environment and Natural Resources, and funded by the Japan International Cooperation Agency, would never succeed. But Ortega and his team made it not only viable but globally known. Ortega and his team at the CFI also received considerable media attention over catching the largest saltwater crocodile in the country.

In 1993 the CFI came up with the idea of farming out their crocodiles. The idea sparked considerable interest, and over 80 potential crocodile farmers applied. Nineteen of these were in attendance on February 1 to 3, 1999, when Ortega hosted the “Orientation on the Establishment of Crocodile Farms in the Philippines.” After screening applicants, the CFI gave 6 crocodile farmers their first crocodiles in early 2000. Ortega's initiative thus represented the birth of the crocodile industry in the Philippines.

== Political career (2001–2004) ==
Ortega resigned from his post at Crocodile Farm in time to run for a position in the Provincial Board of Palawan during the elections of 2001. He won and held that post until 2004.

It was during this time that Ortega is said to have first gained access to "information and documents about widespread corruption in the provincial government of Palawan." As a result, Ortega became "the foremost critic of then Governor Mario Joel T. Reyes."

In 2004, Ortega ran for Governor of Palawan, under a good governance platform where he lost to Governor Reyes.

== Environmental advocacy and community organizing (2004–2011) ==
Uncertain about their future career, given the political and economic situation in the Philippines, he and his wife Patty briefly considered taking a job abroad.

Sometime later that year, the ABS-CBN Foundation recruited Ortega to become project director of Bantay Kalikasan-Palawan.

=== Sustainable ecotourism ===
In his capacity as project director of Bantay Kalikasan-Palawan, Ortega spearheaded the establishment of five community-based sustainable tourism sites operated by the community and for the community.

Ortega explained the way these projects were structured to Philippine Star journalist Faizza Farinna Tanggol on January 22, 2011:

“All of these are the project of the community-based sustainable tourism where the support is the community and 100 percent of the profits go to the community. All of the employees, managers, and all of the workers are from the community.”

“We do not have to destroy the environment for us to benefit from it.... We just need to take care of it so we can invite guests for them to see the natural beauty of our environment so that our countrymen will have opportunities from that. As we always say — kung may pakialam, may pakinabang.” (whoever contributes benefits.)

The five eco-tourism projects spearheaded by Bantay-Kalikasan Palawan under Ortega are:

- the Bacungan River Cruise;
- Snorkeling in Honda Bay and island-hopping at the Pambato Reef Dalubkaragatan;
- Dolphin- and Whale-watching in Puerto Princesa Bay;
- Firefly watching on the Iwahig River; and
- Ugong Rock Rock Climb and Zip Line.

== Journalism (2004–2011) ==
At this time, Ortega also began serving as an anchor/commentator in a number of radio stations in Palawan, allowing him to promote his environmental advocacy and continue his anti-corruption campaign. He was part of TV Patrol Palawan in 2006-2010.

=== Death threats ===
By late 2009, Ortega had begun regularly receiving death threats because of the hard-hitting nature of his radio programs, at one point prompting the family to get a bodyguard for him. Puerto Princesa City Former Mayor Edward Hagedorn revealed that Ortega was especially concerned when at one point the threats extended to his daughters.

== The "Ten Million Signatures for the Banning of Mining in Palawan" campaign ==
In January 2011, Ortega, together with Bantay Kalikasan decided to launch a broad campaign against mining in Palawan, in response to the approval of large scale mining by the Palawan Council for Sustainable Development (PCSD) the month before.

Ortega was getting ready to travel to Manila for the launching of the Ten Million Signatures Campaign for the banning of mining operations in the province of Palawan when he was assassinated.

== Assassination ==
At around 10:30 in the morning of January 24, 2011, Ortega had just finished broadcasting on his morning show "Ramatak" for Radyo Mo Nationwide's (RMN) Palawan station dwAR-FM, and was supposed to prepare for a scheduled journey to Manila to promote the Ten Million Signatures campaign. He stopped at an "ukay-ukay" (used clothing) thrift store in Puerto Princesa.

It was here that a gunman came up behind Ortega, and shot him in the back of the head.

=== Initial arrests ===
After a brief chase, police apprehended the alleged shooter, Marlon Recamata, who confessed to the crime at the Puerto Princesa Police Office.

Recamata originally claimed that the motivation for the killing was simply robbery, but numerous parties including the Committee to Protect Journalists, the Asian Human Rights Commission, Puerto Princesa Mayor Edward Hagedorn, and ABS CBN's Bantay Kalikasan, through its head Gina Lopez, pointed out that this was unlikely, given the way the murder was conducted, the fact that Ortega did not present himself as someone likely to be worth robbing. Recamata also implicated three others in his statements: Rodolfo O. Edrad Jr., Dennis C. Aranas, and Armando R. Noel. Recamata pleaded guilty to murder charges on February 11, 2011. The case was heard at the Puerto Princesa trial court. He was convicted in 2016 and sentenced to reclusion perpetua (20 to 40 years in prison).

A second suspect, Percival Lecias, was invited for questioning by the Puerto Princesa office of the National Bureau of Investigation (NBI) on January 25, 2011.

Dennis Aranas was arrested in Coron, Palawan, three days after the assassination, on January 28, 2011. He also confessed to the crime at the Puerto Princesa Police Office.

Edrad surrendered to Puerto Princesa Mayor Edward Hagedorn in Lucena, Quezon, on February 5, 2011, and Hagedorn brought him to the National Bureau of Investigation NBI headquarters in Manila. Armando Noel surrendered to the NBI at their Taft Avenue headquarters on February 10, 2011. Both Edrad and Noel confessed to the crime before the NBI.

Another suspect, Edwin Arandia gave himself up on February 27, 2011, to Fr. Robert Reyes who accompanied him to the NBI.

=== Further investigation ===
The police found the .45 caliber pistol Recamata had allegedly used to kill Ortega in a trash bin along the road, where Recamata had thrown it while trying to escape. Upon examination, it was found to be registered to former Palawan provincial administrator Romeo M. Seratubias. A man named Arturo Regalado later surrendered to the authorities, claiming he had purchased the gun from Seratubias.

In the confession he gave the NBI in Manila, Edrad implicated in Ortega's murder former Marinduque Governor Jose Antonio N. Carrion and former Palawan Governor Joel T. Reyes. Edrad said he was a former bodyguard to Carrion and Joel Reyes. Edrad also implicated former Coron, Palawan Mayor Mario T. Reyes Jr., and Arturo Regalado, the man who bought the gun from Atty. Seratubias.

Governor Reyes later denied having hired Edrad as a security aide, while Governor Carrion, who said Edrad was indeed a former security aide, denied ever talking to Edrad about any plot.

=== Dismissal of charges by First Panel against alleged masterminds ===
Before criminal charges can be filed, prosecutors must determine if there is reasonable evidence against the accused. In a resolution dated June 8, 2011, a panel of prosecutors from the Philippines' Department of Justice (DOJ) dismissed criminal charges filed against former Marinduque Governor Jose Antonio N. Carrion, former Palawan Gov. Mario Joel T. Reyes, former Palawan Mayor Mario T. Reyes, former provincial administrator Atty. Romeo Serratubias, Arturo Regalado, and Percival B. Lecias, citing "insufficiency of evidence".

The same resolution said that there was probable cause to charge Rodolfo Edrad Jr., Armando Noel, Dennis Aranas, and Arwin Arandia with murder.

On July 1, 2011, Patty Ortega filed a 47-page motion for reconsideration at the Department of Justice, asking the investigating panel to recommend that charges be filed against Reyes and the five others who had been absolved by the panel, arguing that those she alleged to be the "masterminds and principals" behind the killing ought to be charged, not just the ones who were charged, whom she referred to as "pawns whose participation in the murder were merely at best as accessories."

=== Reversal of Dismissal of Charges by Second Panel ===
On March 13, 2012, the Department of Justice, after a review by a second panel, reversed its former decision of dismissing the cases against Governor Joel Reyes, Mayor Mario Reyes, Romeo Seratubias, Arturo Regalado, and Percival Lecias and ordered the filing of murder charges against them on the death of Ortega after the reviewing the motion for reconsideration filed by Ortega's wife the previous year and taking into account the new evidences presented there. Only former Governor Jose Carreon was not included in the charges due to insufficiency of evidence. Murder charges were filed on March 17, some of those named were picked up for trial. Joel and Mario Reyes brothers eluded arrest by fleeing the country.

=== Override by Circuit Court of Appeals ===
Attorneys for the accused filed an appeal that the Second Panel was not legal and the First Panel cleared their client. In November 2012, the Circuit Court of Appeals (CA) agreed. The second panel of prosecutors should not have been formed without first without reversing the findings of the original panel. Alternately, new evidence, or any review should have been directed to the First Panel that had voted to not prosecute. The Department of Justice asked the CA to reverse their ruling. Instead, in September 2013, the CA affirmed their first ruling. They cited the "finding by the first panel of prosecutors has not yet been reversed, affirmed or modified". Therefore, it still stood.

The DOJ filed an appeal to the Supreme Court of the Philippines to uphold the findings of the second panel.

In October 2014, a third ruling by the CA affirmed the ability of DOJ Justice Secretary Leila de Lima "to review, revise, reverse, or modify the resolutions of her prosecutors who conducted preliminary investigations." This confirmed the ability of the DOJ to comply with the family wishes that the first panel review its decision. Additionally, the CA rejected a motion by the Reyes brothers to bar de Lima from the case owing to comments made to the press that they believed demonstrated a bias against them.

In August 2015, the Ortega family renewed their call for their petition to the first panel be made. According to a petition drive on Change.org we "decry the de facto inaction and seeming apathy of authorities in resolving the Ortega case and all media killings in the country".

As of September 2015 the Supreme Court had not ruled on the appeal made by the DOJ to validate the second panel. Meanwhile, the family of Ortega pressed the DOJ for a review by the first panel. However, de Lima said she could not act on the family's petition because this may affect the DOJ appeal in the Supreme Court.

=== Flight and arrest of Reyes brothers ===
In August 2012, reward money for information about the whereabouts of the Reyes brothers helped spring information. At a media forum at Club Filipino, a man appeared with a cloth hiding his face before reporters. The unidentified man was presented by former Solicitor General Francisco Chavez and Sandra Cam of the Whistleblowers Association of the Philippine. He claimed he drove the Reyes brothers to the airport and that Bureau of Immigration officials assisted with their flight to Vietnam. He also claimed he drove their attorney, Hermie Aban, to the airport who was the friend of the immigration officials.

They appear to have fled on March 18, 2012, using a passport under the name Joseph Lim Pe. Immigration records showed that a certain Lim Pe and a companion left for Vietnam via a Cebu Pacific flight.

Two officials were placed under suspension in 2012. In late September 2015, Wesley Gutierrez, a guard and Rogelio Delgado Udarbe, an administrative assistant, were found guilty of administrative charges of gross neglect of duty and conduct prejudicial to the best interest of the service and formally dismissed.

In December 2014, police came close to catching the pair when tracing calls. A source from Thailand was identified. Interpol and Thai police evidently spooked the pair when doing surveillance. The brothers moved out before agents moved in.

In early September 2015 a tip by email informed officials the pair was residing in a villa in a resort town on Phuket Island, Thailand. The Thai government was asked to investigate and the brothers were arrested for over staying their visas. They were deported back to the Philippines to face charges in September 25, 2015.

The Thai police found Joel Reyes was using a fake Malaysian passport and the name "Jhonny Leong." Mario Reyes was using a falsified Philippine passport and using the name "Nicholas Lim Gatchalian" and called himself Nicky.

Upon his arrival in the Philippines, Joel claimed that he and his brother were not hiding, and that they turned themselves in to Thai authorities.

Shortly after being jailed in Puerto Princesa, the jail's warden was relieved of his position over allegations of special treatment afforded to the brothers in contravention to a government pledge of no special treatment.

=== Post capture proceedings and fallout ===
On September 28, 2015, the DOJ announced a team of lawyers was investigating the implications of reviewing and/or reversing the findings by the first panel that was in favor of not prosecuting the Reyes brothers. A decision was expected in two weeks.

On October 2, 2015, the Reyes brothers refused to make a plea for the killing of Ortega and the judge entered a plea of not guilty on their behalf. The case pre-trial conference and bail request hearing were set for December 3, 2015.

On September 30, 2015, the Office of the Philippine Vice President Jejomar Binay called upon the DOJ to investigate former Makati vice mayor Ernesto Mercado for his possible involvement in hiding the Reyes brothers. According to VP Binay, police confirmed Mercado had been receiving calls and messages from the Reyes brothers. Mercado meanwhile had been providing testimony against Binay's son, former mayor of Makati Jejomar Erwin Junjun Binay had been accused of corruption and bribing one of the same judges in the Court of Appeals that issued adverse rulings in the Ortega cases.

Philippine Senator Antonio Trillanes IV publicly named and claimed two judges on the Court of Appeals were paid off by the Binay family. Initially, he did not name who the front man was for the Binay family. However, later he named a local law firm which employed the daughter of the justice that ruled on the Ortega case. One of her specialty areas is mining.

In mid-October 2015 the brothers declared themselves as candidates for office in the 2016 elections. Joel will run for mayor and Mario as vice mayor of Coron town.

=== Court decisions ===
In late January 2016, the Supreme Court rendered a decision regarding whether the Reyes could be prosecuted for the murder. The Supreme Court determined that "The trial court has already determined, independently of any finding or recommendation by the First Panel or Second Panel, that probable cause exists for the issuance of the warrant of arrest against respondent. Probable cause has been judicially determined. Jurisdiction over the case, therefore, has transferred to the trial court."

In early March 2016, a former top aide of Governor Reyes, Arturo "Nonoy" Regalado, was found guilty. He was sentenced to reclusión perpetua. His role in the murder included the purchase of the gun.

At the Reyeses trial on March 21, 2016, bodyguard Rodolfo Edrad Jr. testified that he hired the killers, and identified the brothers as the masterminds. He testified that his employer, the then governor and his brother, paid him P500,000.

In August 2017, the anti-graft court Sandiganbayan convicted Joel Reyes with one count of graft and sentenced him to 6 to 8 years in prison over an illegal small-scale mining permit in Puerto Princesa in 2006.

However, in early January 2018, the Court of Appeals freed Joel Reyes from jail. The court ruling said that the Palawan Regional Trial Court had no basis to hold him for trial over the murder of broadcaster and environmentalist Gerry Ortega and deemed him a free man. No other explanation was made, despite the conviction of Reyes in a different case in August 2017.

On January 29, 2018, the Sandiganbayan ordered the arrest of Joel Reyes in connection with his conviction for the anomalous renewal of small-scale mining permits. Reyes is also facing separate charges at the Sandiganbayan over the Malampaya and fertilizer fund scams. The Malampaya fund scam has also been link to Ortega's murder. On September 11, 2024, Joel Reyes surrendered to the National Bureau of Investigation.

== Legacy ==
=== Fund for Palawan journalists ===
Inspired by plans originally conceived by Ortega, local media units in Palawan, through the Alyansa ng Panlalawigang Mamamahayag Inc. (APAMAI) and the local chapter of the National Union of Journalists of the Philippines (NUJP), launched a savings and loan fund project for their members on July 24, 2011.

=== Campaign against the killing of journalists ===
According to Forbidden Stories, Ortega was one of 13 reporters around the world killed from 2009 and 2019 for investigating environmental issues.

UNESCO director general Irina Bokova condemned Ortega's murder, stating that "It is unacceptable that yet again, firearms have been used to silence the voice of someone who in his work defended the right of citizens to be informed, a fundamental right of democratic society."

On the anniversary of Ortega's killing in January 2024, press freedom, human rights, and environmental activists held a tribute for Ortega outside the Supreme Court, and called on the international community to help push for the protection of environmental defenders in the Philippines. From 2012 to 2024, 281 environmental defenders have been killed, making the Philippines the most dangerous in country in Asia for environmental activist, according to the Environmental Defenders Congress.

In March 2024, international press freedom groups Free Press Unlimited, the Committee to Protect Journalists (CPJ), Reporters Without Borders, and the National Union of Journalists of the Philippines called on the Philippine government to resolve the Ortega murder case. The CPJ described Ortega's murder as an "emblematic case" of impunity relating to the killing of journalists in the Philippines.
