= Pandacan oil depot =

Coordinates: 14°35′38″N 121°00′24″E

Pandacan Oil Depot
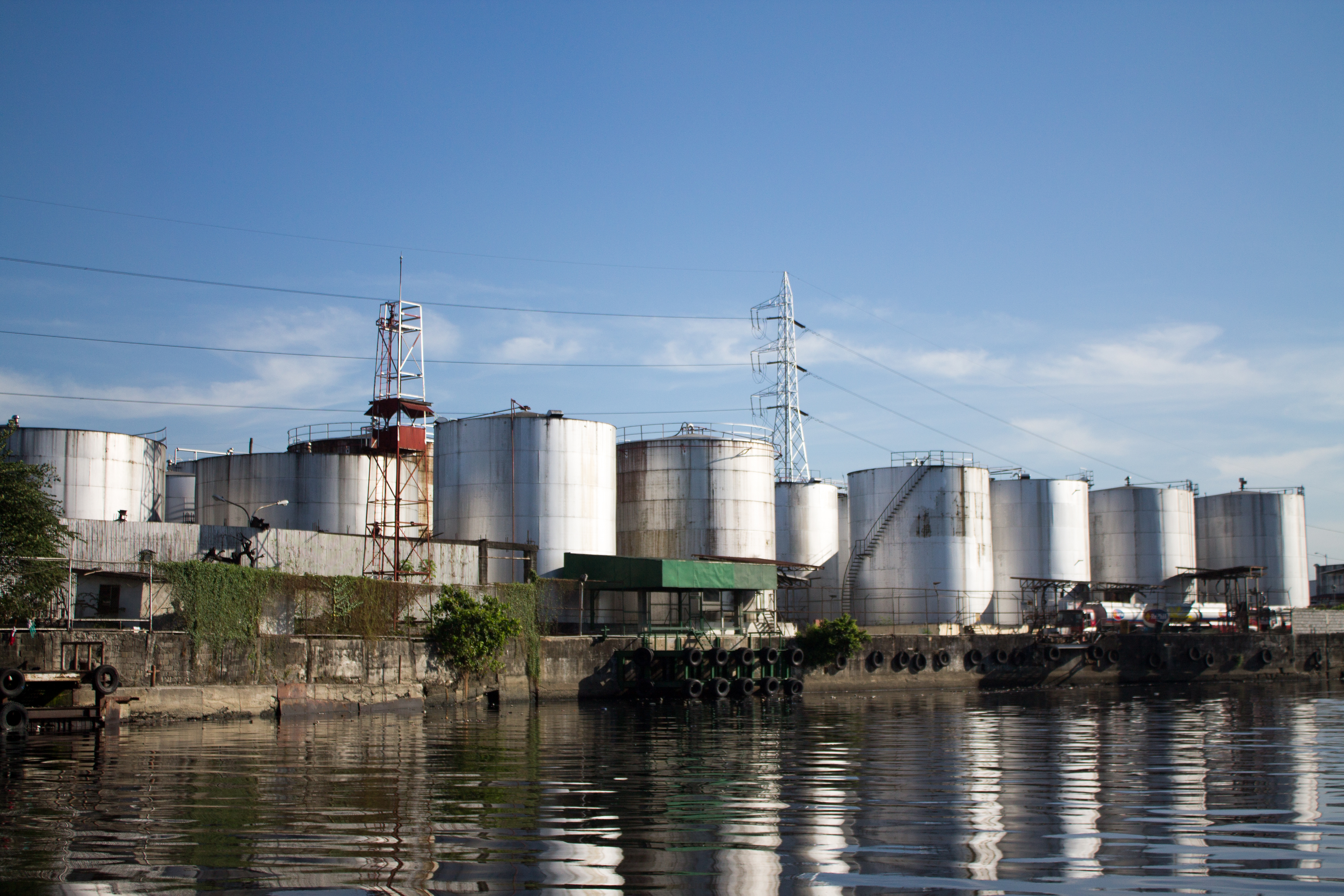
- Interactive map of the Pandacan Oil Depot area

General information
- Status: Demolished
- Type: Oil terminal
- Location: Pandacan, Manila, Philippines
- Demolished: 2016
- Owner: Philippine National Oil Company

The Pandacan Oil Depot was a 33-hectare compound in Pandacan, Manila, Philippines. It housed the storage facilities and distribution terminals of three major players in the country's petroleum industry, namely Caltex (a petroleum brand name of Chevron Corporation), Petron, and Shell. The oil depot took its roots from separate establishments by these oil companies.

The continued operation of the oil depot in a densely populated major city was a subject of various concerns, including its environmental and health impact to the residents of Manila.

== History ==
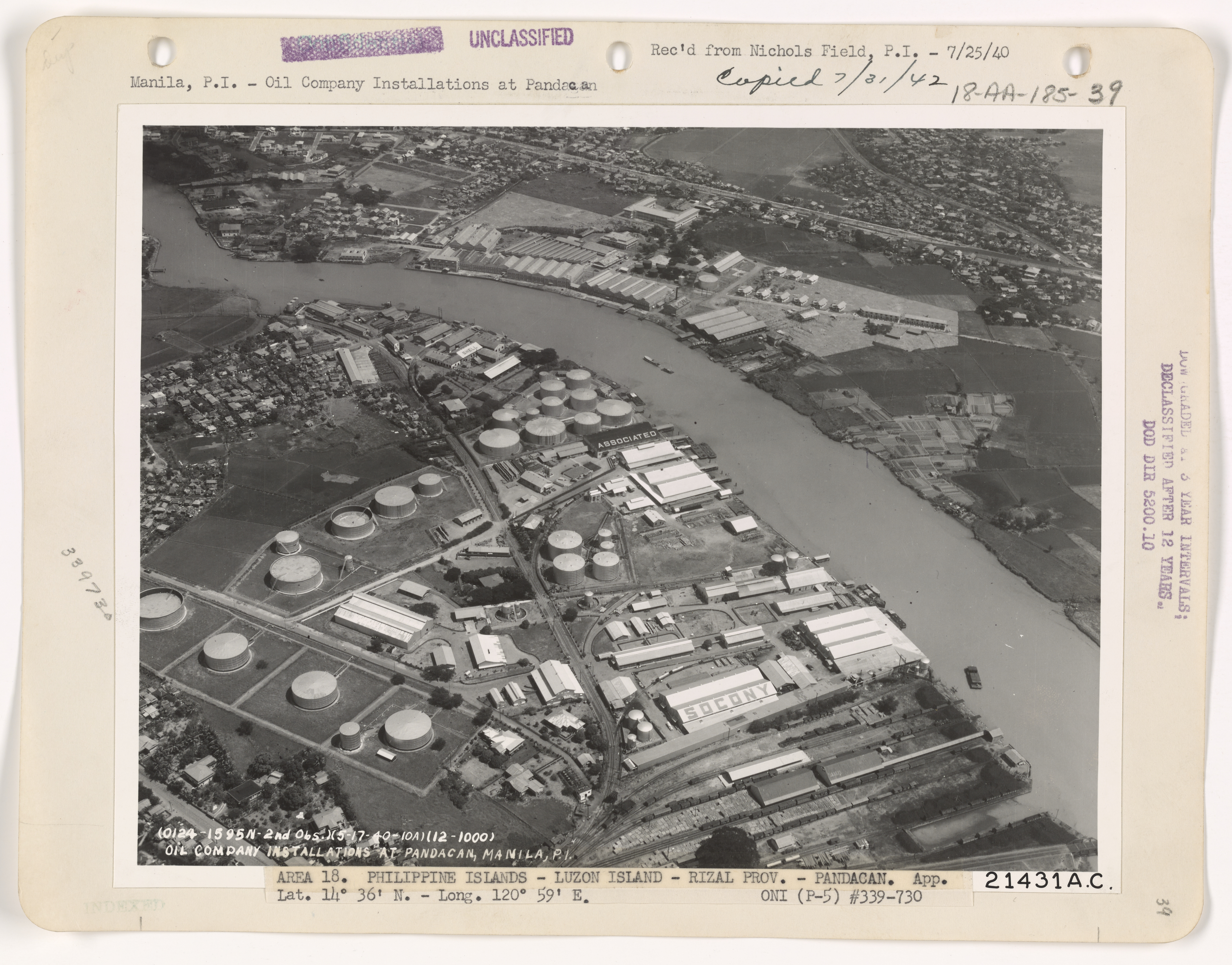
Aerial view of the depot, 1940

Shell established facilities in 1914. Caltex began using the Pandacan warehouse depot in 1917, when it started marketing its products in the Philippines. Eleven years later, its Pandacan warehouse depot was converted into a key distribution terminal to bring products to nearby provinces. Petron followed suit in 1922.

== Incidents and concerns ==
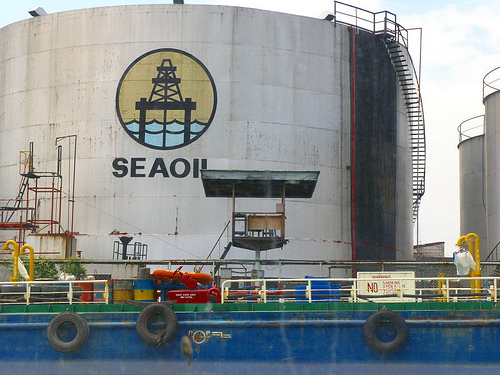
One of the storage facilities in the oil depot.

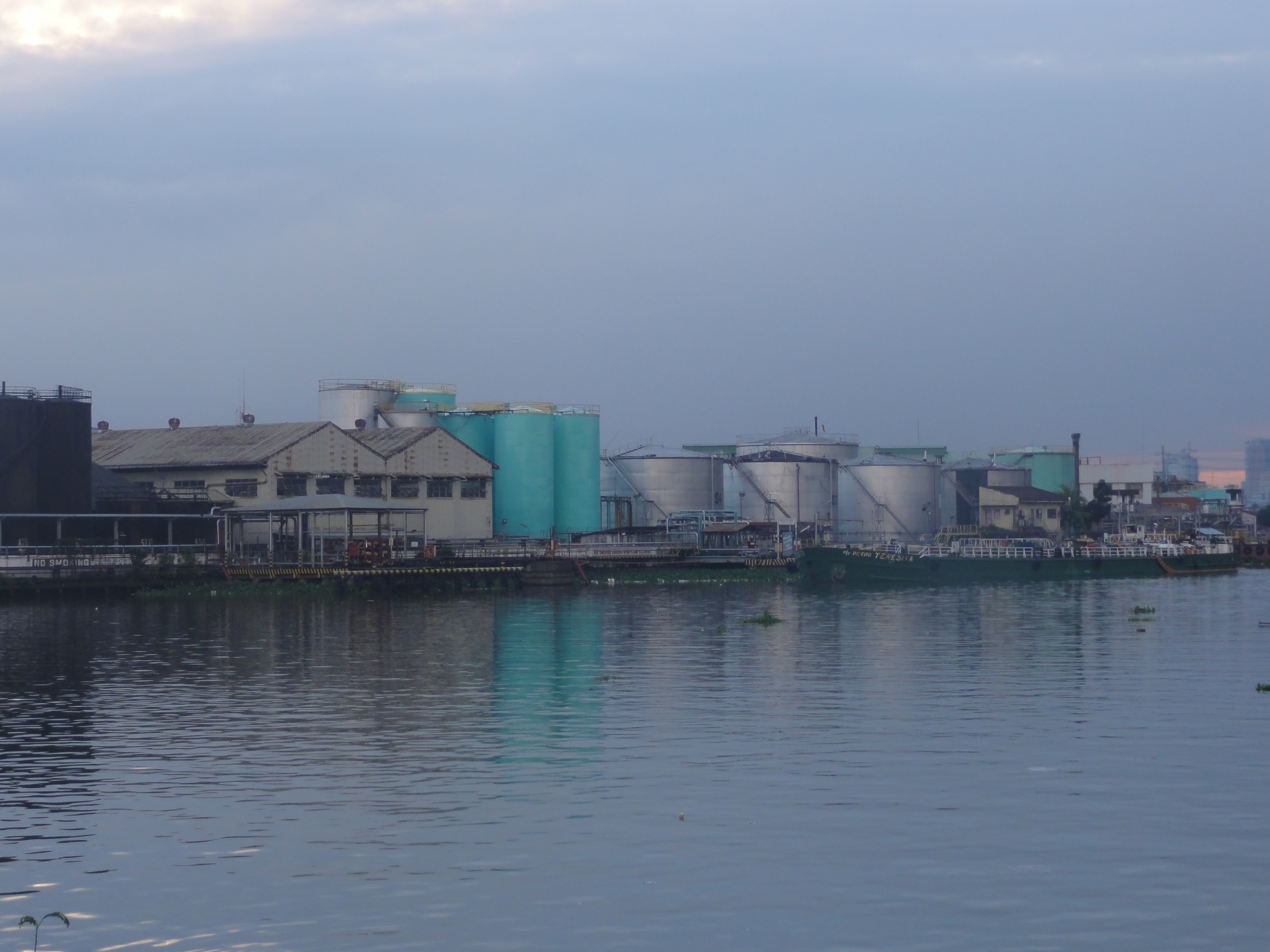
The oil depot in 2014

The continued operation of the oil depot in a large, densely populated city has been a subject of various concerns, including its environmental and health impact to the residents of the adjacent community surrounding the compound, as well as to the larger Manila population. International standards allow oil depots to operate within a 20-kilometer radius buffer zone, away from residential and commercial establishments which would be directly affected by the facility’s everyday operations and impending accidents in the future.

In 1997, two Shell oil tankers exploded inside the oil depot complex. In 1999, a pipeline leak was the source of fires in Muntinlupa, killing one. In January 2008, a tanker burst into flames at the foot of the Nagtahan Flyover. In 2005, the College of Medicine of the University of the Philippines Manila conducted the cross-sectional study which found that the number of cases of neurophysical disorders in the area surrounding the area have been progressively increasing. In the same year, a health survey proved that the air surrounding the oil depot contains high levels of benzene, a chemical compound known to increase risks of cancer.

In July 2010, the leak of the underground pipeline of the First Philippine Industrial Corporation (FPIC), which carries oil from the oil refineries in the province of Batangas to Pandacan, contaminated the water table under the basement of West Tower Condominium in Barangay Bangkal, Makati.

In 2013, Laguna Lake Development Authority (LLDA) General Manager Nereus Acosta fined the operator of the depot with ₱200,000 daily due to environmental violations in the Pasig River, which is connected to Laguna Lake.

Malacañang Palace, the official residence of the President of the Philippines, is only two kilometers away from the depot.

The Polytechnic University of the Philippines is located directly across from the depots on the banks of the Pasig River.

== Legislative actions ==
In 2001, the Manila City Council passed Ordinance No. 8027 that changed the classification of Pandacan from an industrial to a commercial area. It gave the oil depot six months to cease operating in the area. In 2006, Ordinance No. 8119 ordered the phasing out of hazardous industries in the city, including the depot. In 2009, Ordinance 8027 was upheld by the Supreme Court of the Philippines; while the City Council passed Ordinance No. 8187 to negate the first ordinance. This time, Pandacan was re-classified as a heavy industrial zone, allowing the depot to operate. The ordinance was later ruled by the Supreme Court as invalid.

Thru the efforts of community activists who are members of the Advocates for Environmental and Social Justice (AESJ) coalition of Manila, City Ordinance No. 8283 re-classified the area as a high-intensity commercial zone in 2012, thus giving the oil depot until 2016 to relocate, but was vetoed by then Mayor Alfredo Lim. The proposal instead was to transfer the facilities to the North Harbor, still in Manila.

== Dismantlement ==
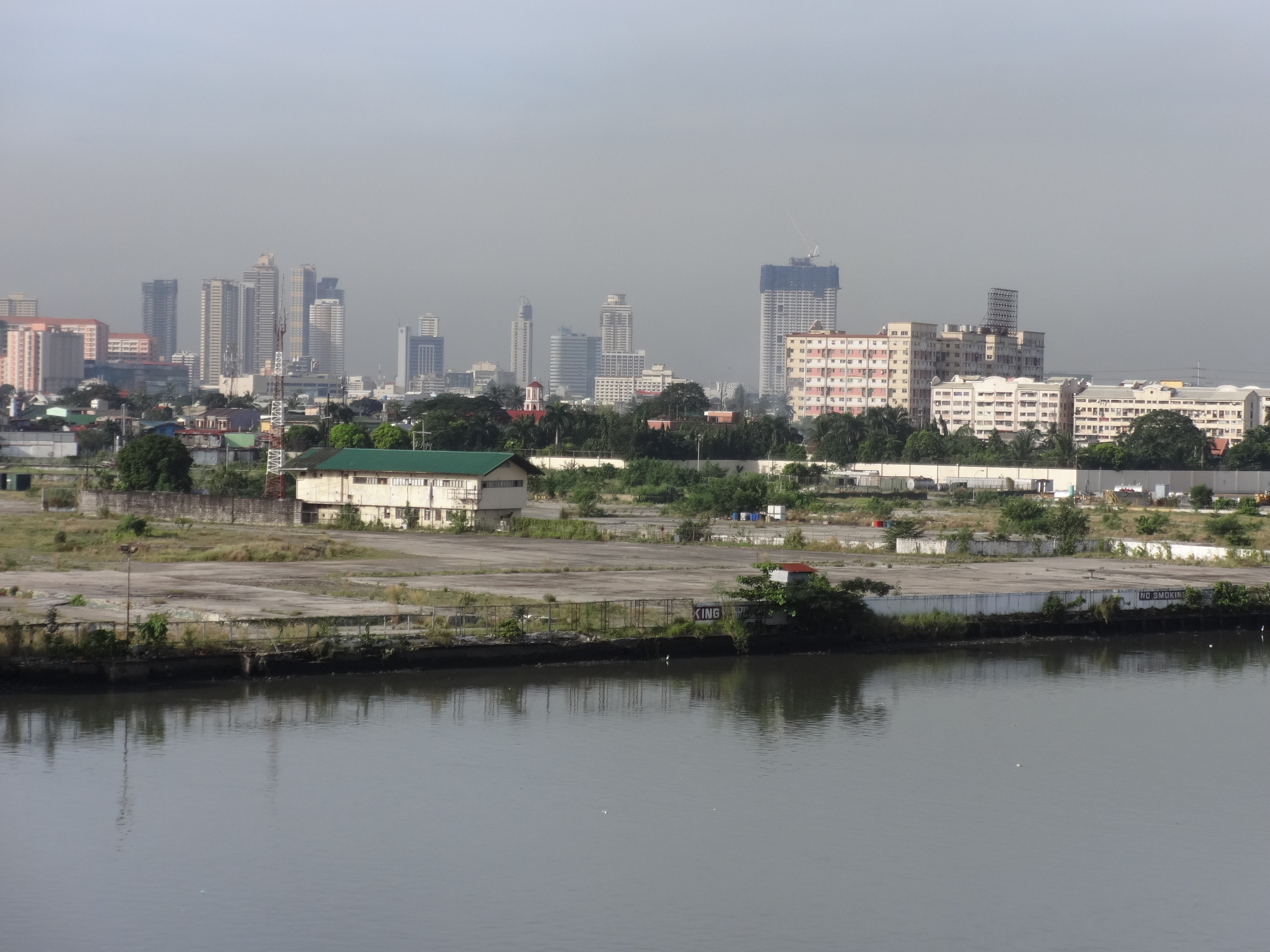
The site of the former oil depot, 2017.

Shell started dismantling the oil depot in July 2015. By the following month, at least three tanks has been dismantled. The oil depot was later dismantled completely.

In January 2017, Petron announced that it plans to establish a public market in a property within the site of the former oil depot.

In June 2019, the San Miguel Corporation (SMC) submitted a P10-billion proposal to the Department of Transportation (DOTr) to convert the former depot site into a bus and food terminal complex.

== See also ==
- Buncefield oil depot
- Malampaya gas field
