= Malampaya gas field =

Filipino fossil fuel extraction area

Malampaya Gas Field
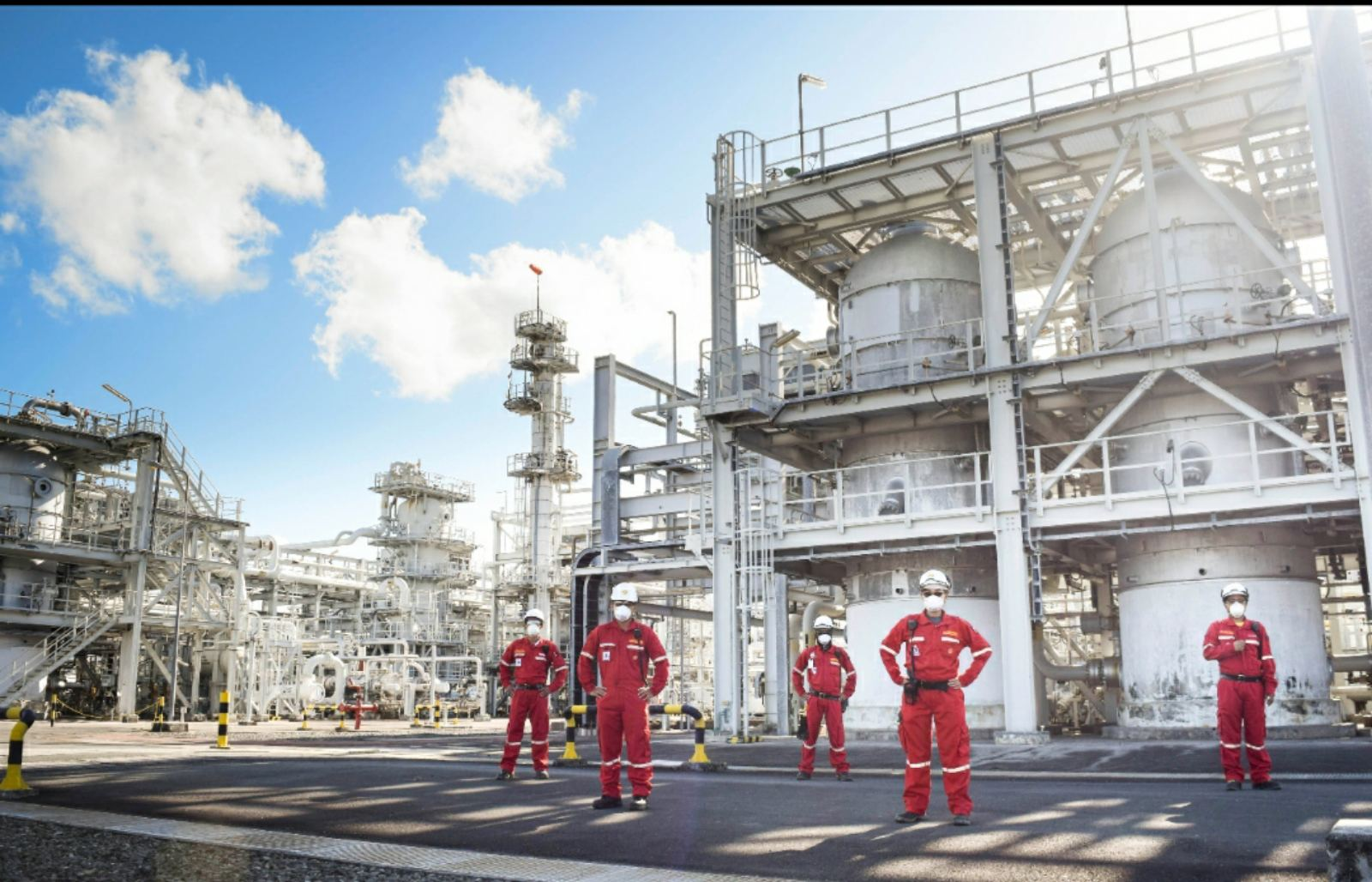
- Malampaya Batangas Onshore Gas Plant
- Country: Philippines
- Region: West Philippine Sea
- Location: Palawan
- Block: SC 38
- Offshore/onshore: Offshore
- Operator: Shell Philippines Exploration B.V. _{(Before 2022)}; Prime Energy Resources Development B.V.
- Partners: Chevron Malampaya LLC, PNOC-EC

Field history
- Discovery: 1989
- Start of development: 1997
- Start of production: 2001

Production
- Producing formations: Nido Formation

The Malampaya gas field, also known as the Malampaya–Camago field, is a deepwater gas-condensate reservoir, located in the Service Contract 38 license area, located offshore, 65 kilometres (40 mi) northwest of the island of Palawan, Philippines.

== History ==
The field was discovered during the drilling of the Camago-1 well in 1989, and following successful appraisal of the Malampaya field in the 1990s, first gas flowed in September 2001. Commercial production started in January 2002. The field was developed and was operated by Shell Philippines Exploration B.V. (SPEX), under Royal Dutch Shell, with joint venture partners Chevron Malampaya LLC and Philippine National Oil Company Exploration Corporation. On November 13, 2019, the Dennis Uy-led Udenna Corp. acquired Chevron Philippines Ltd.’s 45% stake. The Senate raised "red flags" about the company's expertise and financial capability to operate the gas field.

The Malampaya Phase 1 development included five production wells, tied back via flowlines to the Shallow Water Platform. Gas is exported through a 504-km subsea Gas Export Pipeline that delivers to the Onshore Gas Plant in Batangas City on Luzon Island to the northeast, for final treatment and metering.

Shell successfully completed Malampaya Phase 2 in 2013, which added two new production wells. Malampaya Phase 3 saw the design, fabrication and installation of a new depletion compression platform to maintain levels of gas production, which began operating in October 2015. This was the first oil and gas platform to be designed and built in the Philippines, and its successful completion has made the country a player in construction for the oil and gas industry.

The upstream component of the US$4.5 billion Malampaya gas-to-power project was expected to provide substantial long-term revenue of between $8 billion–$10 billion to the Philippine government over its lifespan. As of 2018, the project has already surpassed US$10 billion in government revenues. Malampaya's main benefits to the Philippines include reducing oil imports, assuring a more stable supply of energy and a cleaner source of power, and meeting up to about 40% of Luzon's energy requirements. The operation of Malampaya in the power stations' full capacity of 3,200 megawatts is displacing over 1.35 million kilograms of CO_{2} per hour–a cleaner and more sustainable process, as compared to energy generation using coal or fuel oil.

On January 19, 2026, President Bongbong Marcos announced the discovery of an estimated 98,000,000,000 ft^{3} (2.8×10^{9} m^{3}) of gas reserves from the Malampaya East-1 field, located 5 km (3.1 mi) east of the main field. Two months later, President Marcos Jr. announced the "successful drilling and testing" of the Camago-3 gas well which, according to him, holds more than twice the recoverable gas compared to Malampaya East-1.

=== Recent geopolitics ===
In May 2023, President Marcos stated there were ongoing negotiations with China concerning the latter "claiming particular areas where the Malampaya fields are located", and that both sides were "slowly inching towards a resolution".

== Key facts ==
Location: Offshore Palawan, Philippines

Depth: Wells are in 820 meters (2,690 feet) of water depth and the reservoir is 2,990 meters below sea level

Interests: Shell Philippines Exploration B.V. 45% (Shell-operated), Chevron 45%, Philippine National Oil Company-Exploration Corporation (government) 10%

Key contractors: Malampaya is a joint undertaking of the Philippine national government and the private sector. The project is spearheaded by the Philippine Department of Energy (DOE) and developed and operated by Shell Philippines Exploration B.V. (SPEX) on behalf of joint venture partners Chevron Malampaya LLC and the Philippine National Oil Corporation-Exploration Corporation

Fields: Camago-Malampaya gas reservoir

Production (100%):

- about 429 million cubic feet per day (12.1 million cubic metres per day) gas production at standard conditions
- about 15 thousand barrels (2,400 m^{3}) per day condensate

== Malampaya gas fund ==
The Malampaya Gas Fund is the name given to a government fund comprising profits from the Malampaya Deep Water Gas-to-Power project. It was created to support energy resource development and exploration programs, with the President of the Philippines given the prerogative to determine other uses for the profits.

=== Malampaya fund scam ===
In the House of Representatives, Bayan Muna party-list representative Neri Colmenares proposed the abolition of the Malampaya fund, citing alleged anomalous contracts that result in loss of money by the Philippine government and high energy costs for Filipino consumers.

The 2011 murder of environmentalist and broadcaster Gerry Ortega is believed to be linked to his exposé of the alleged anomalies relating to the Malampaya fund.

In 2013, the Supreme Court declared unconstitutional the use by the President of the Malampaya Fund for projects outside of energy development.

==== Malampaya fund scam 1 ====
In 2017, the Ombudsman filed before the Sandiganbayan 159 criminal charges against former Palawan Governor Mario Joel Reyes and 41 other government officials for alleged procurement anomalies in 209 contracts funded by ₱1.53 billion from the Malampaya Fund in 2008 and 2009. Motions to dismiss the criminal charges against Reyes and other defendants were rejected in January 2024.

In 2025, the Sandiganbayan convicted Reyes for 11 counts of graft and sentenced to 66 to 110 years imprisonment. Also convicted were other provincial government officials and contractors.

==== Malampaya fund scam 2 ====
In 2009, President Gloria Macapagal Arroyo authorized then-Budget Secretary Rolando Andaya Jr. to release ₱900 million from the fund to aid victims of Tropical Storm Ondoy and Typhoon Pepeng. The amount did not go to the communities affected by the disasters, but was allegedly plundered after being released to nongovernmental organizations linked to Janet Lim-Napoles. Arroyo, Andaya, Napoles, former executive secretary Eduardo Ermita, and former agrarian reform secretary Nasser Pangandaman were charged for plunder by the National Bureau of Investigation before the Ombudsman in October 2013.

Andaya and Napoles were charged for allegedly violating the Anti-Graft and Corrupt Practices Act. The Sandiganbayan anti-graft court denied Andaya's motion to dismiss charges against him in March 2019. Department of Agrarian Reform executives who were charged as co-conspirators also filed motions to dismiss that were denied by the Sandiganbayan on June 21, 2022.

In 2023, Arroyo was charged before the Ombudsman for the alleged misuse of ₱38 billion from the Malampaya fund, including funds that were supposedly allotted to agricultural, irrigation, and transport projects, national security activities, and the health and transport sectors.

== See also ==
- Malampaya Sound Protected Landscape and Seascape
- Pandacan oil depot
- Philippines and the Spratly Islands
- West Philippine Sea
