= Ostrich farming in the Philippines =

The business of ostrich farming in the Philippines began in the Philippines in 1996. It was started by Lorenzo U. Limketkai, an engineer, and his son Heintje Limketkai. Heintje Limketkai took a month-long training course on ostrich farming in Australia. After that training, the Limketkais established their ostrich farming business and named it as the Philippine Ostrich and Crocodile Farms, Inc., becoming the first combined ostrich and crocodile farm in the country.

== History ==
Their ostrich farm was opened in Barangay Malanang, Opol, Misamis Oriental. They bought their first three pairs of breeding ostriches from Australia in July 1996. The first ostrich egg that was laid on August 30, 1996, but the hatching failed. After improvements were made to the facilities and to the egg-handling techniques, a live ostrich chick hatched for the first time in February 1997. Afterwards, the Limketkais bought two additional groups of breeding ostriches from Texas, United States. The business later opened its facilities "to the public for supervised tours".

The first ostrich, as a product, was harvested and prepared as meat for fine dining restaurants on December 23, 1997, under the Big Bird Ostrich Meat brand. After that, thirty ostriches were routinely harvested on a monthly basis for supermarkets and deli shops.

One adult ostrich can provide around 100 kilos of red meat, which can be sold for 400–500 pesos (US$8–11 as of January 2014) per kilo. Ostrich eggs, skin and feathers had also been sold to the market. Ostrich feathers are used to produce feather dusters and as decorations, while ostrich skin is used to produce leather. Eggs cost 500 pesos (US$11) apiece, providing to one ostrich farming business an annual income of 50,000 pesos (US$1,100) per adult female, because a mother ostrich can lay about 100 eggs annually.

After the establishment of the Philippine Ostrich and Crocodile Farms, Inc., the "first and biggest ostrich farm in the Philippines", other ostrich farming businesses were later established in the Philippines, in the regions of Luzon, Visayas, and Mindanao. These include the Gross Ostrich Farm in Nueva Ecija owned by Michael Gross and the Davao Crocodile Park (as the name implies, this farm also has a crocodile farm) in the Davao Region of Mindanao. There is also an ostrich farm in the village of Sta. Monica in San Luis, Pampanga in Luzon.

The ostrich breeding season in the Philippines is from February to October. The Department of Agriculture of the Philippines promoted ostrich farming in response to the world food crisis of 2007–08, as well as an ecotourism and agritourism project.

== See also ==
- Crocodile farming in the Philippines
- Agriculture in the Philippines
