= Crocodile farming in the Philippines =

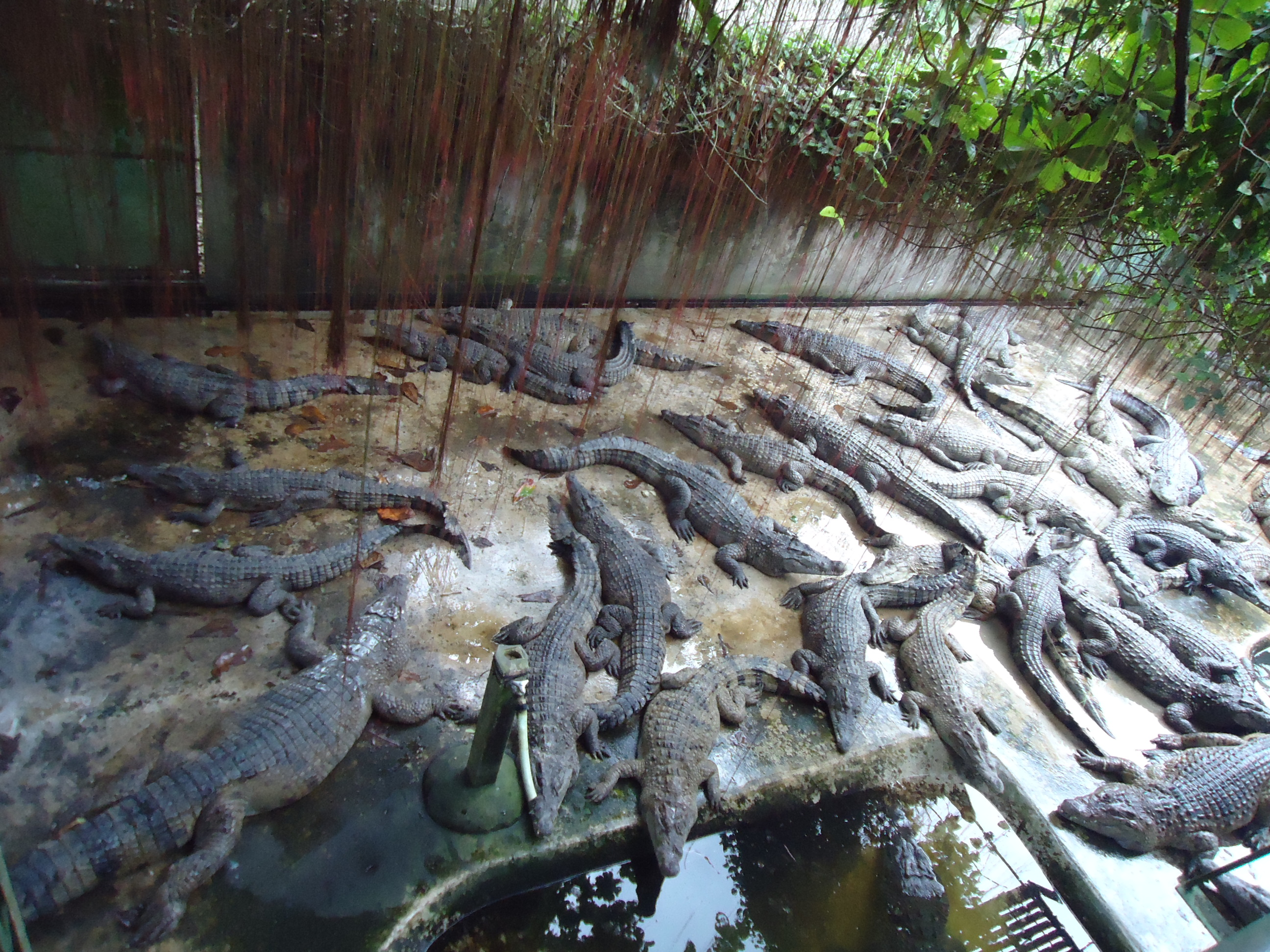
Philippine crocodiles (Crocodylus mindorensis) in a crocodile farm in Palawan, Philippines, in 2010.

Crocodile farming in the Philippines refers to agricultural industries involving the raising and harvesting of crocodiles for the commercial production of Crocodile meat and crocodile leather.

In the Philippines, crocodile farmers breed and raise two species of Philippine crocodiles: the Philippine saltwater crocodile (Crocodylus porosus) and the Philippine freshwater crocodile (Crocodylus mindorensis). Farms that trade crocodile skin are regulated by the Convention on International Trade in Endangered Species (CITES).

Crocodiles help maintain the balance of Philippine ecosystems such as wetlands; crocodile farming in the Philippines is also geared towards the rescue and conservation of both C. porosus and the "endangered and endemic" C. mindorensis. Crocodile farms also contribute to tourism in the Philippines and offer public education about crocodiles.

== History ==
Two species of crocodiles are indigenous to the Philippines: the "saltwater crocodile". Crocodylus porosus, also known as the Indo-Pacific crocodile, thrives in the Indo-Pacific region, Australia, Brunei, India, Malaysia, Papua New Guinea, Singapore, and Thailand. The Mindoro crocodile (Crocodylus mindorensis) is unique to the Philippines that tends to prefer a freshwater habitat. The latter – is considered "critically endangered" by the International Union for Conservation of Nature (IUCN) – is found in Mindoro, Busuanga, Palawan, Masbate, Negros, Samar, and in the islands of Sulu. As both are threatened because of loss of their habitats to humans, conservation efforts apply to them both. Crocodile farming under CITES is geared towards the rescue and sustainable exploitation.

The first crocodile breeding farm in the Philippines was started in Puerto Princesa, Palawan in 1987, and operated from its inauguration until 1994 with technical assistance and cooperation from the Japanese government. The Crocodile Farm and Nature Park, founded to prevent the further decline of the two species of Philippine crocodile, whilst promoting socio-economic well-being of local communities. It farms sustainably and is registered with CITES – the first such crocodile farm in the Philippines. It was renamed the Crocodile Farming Institute (CFI). Pioneer veterinarian and journalist Gerry Ortega started working at the CFI in 1988, and became the CFI's director in 1989. The CFI was expanded in 2000 to incorporate a wildlife rescue center, an eco-destination park, and a training center and was renamed as the Palawan Wildlife Rescue and Conservation Center (PWRCC). In 2005, it was reported that the facility was already overpopulated and losing 3–5 million pesos a year.

In 2013 the PWRCC – under the management of the Protected Areas and Wildlife Bureau of the Department of Environment and Natural Resources (DENR) – were breeding over 600 Mindoro crocodiles and over 700 Philippine saltwater crocodiles for commercial purposes.

== Industry ==
=== Players ===
The PWRCC sells hatchlings, as well as saltwater crocodile products to seven "authorized commercial operators" in the regions of Luzon (particularly in Batangas, Cavite, Rizal, and Tarlac), Visayas (such as in Negros Occidental), and Mindanao (including Cagayan de Oro and Davao del Norte).

Crocodile farms have to be accredited by the government; in addition, there is CITES registration farms in the Philippines that raise crocodiles in a sustainable manner, and only these may export. By 2009, there were 5 commercial crocodile farms in the Philippines, the largest one located in Tanay, Rizal, that had over 2,000 head. In 2012, there were six government-accredited crocodile farms in the Philippines, of which only three CITES-registered. Coral Agri-Venture Farm, a traditional farm, obtained government approval to raise crocodiles in 2000 in a 10-hectare (25-acre) site, where it breeds and raises crocodiles from hatchlings. J. K. Mercado and Sons, an existing player in the archipelago, opened a 10-hectare (25-acre) facility in Kapalong, Davao del Norte in July 2013. It has 6,000 head of livestock, and a slaughterhouse – the second largest in the Philippines and the only one in Mindanao – with a daily throughput of around 24 beasts.

There are three smaller farms, including one combined ostrich/croc facility, where crocodiles reared number in the low hundreds. Then there are two pig farm turned crocodile "tourist centers" in Davao (without Philippine government accreditation).

=== Products ===
Crocodile skins are priced by the centimetre and are extremely valuable due to their use in the production of luxury leather goods by fashion firms such as Louis Vuitton. In particular, the most commercially valuable hide of any crocodilian is that of C. Porosus. It is highly prized for its regular, near-perfect pattern symmetry, and is the type of hide used almost exclusively by Hermès; crocodile skin versions of Birkin bag and Kelly bag are also made from the skin of the C. Porosus.

Meat is sold locally to tourists and to restaurants across the country – one kilogram of crocodile meat can fetch between 400 and 1000 Pesos ($9 and $22) in 2013. The meat supposedly has aphrodisiac properties, and can be used to cook traditional Philippine dishes. It may be found in prepared meals such as adobo, sisig, or made into hot dogs and burgers, or used in soups. Export markets include China and Russia.

== See also ==
- Ostrich farming in the Philippines
- Agriculture in the Philippines
- Lolong
