= Caltex =

International petroleum brand owned by Chevron Corporation

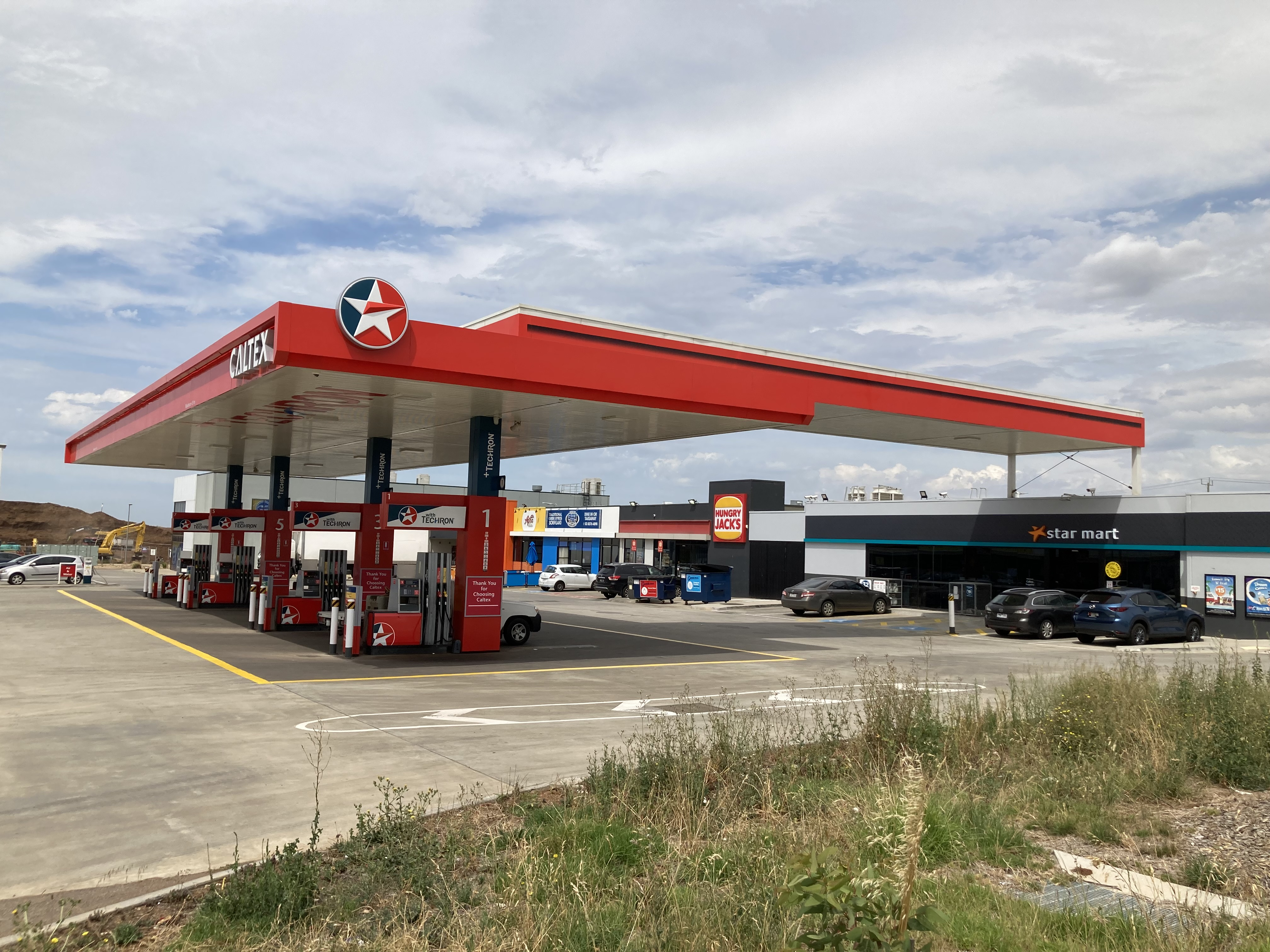
- Caltex station in Melbourne, Australia
- Formerly: California Texas Oil Company Limited (1936–1968); Caltex Petroleum Corporation (1968–1998); Caltex Corporation (1999–2001)
- Type: Joint venture (1936–2001); Brand (since 2001)
- Industry: Petroleum
- Founded: 30 June 1936; 90 years ago
- Headquarters: Singapore (operational)
- Area served: Asia-Pacific; Middle East; Southern Africa
- Products: Oil, fuel
- Parent: Chevron Corporation
- Website: caltex.com

Caltex is a petroleum brand name of Chevron Corporation used in the Asia-Pacific region, the Middle East, and Southern Africa.

Headquartered in Singapore, it is also the brand name of non-Chevron petroleum companies in some countries (such as New Zealand, and previously Australia and South Africa) under a trademark licensing agreement with Chevron.

Caltex was also the name of the joint venture between Chevron and Texaco which used the Caltex brand name in its operations, until both parent companies merged in 2001 to form ChevronTexaco (later renamed simply to Chevron in 2005).

The joint venture was created on 30 June 1936 as California Texas Oil Company Limited, a wholly owned subsidiary of the Bahrain Petroleum Company and was a holding company owning the shares of 5 Texaco marketing subsidiaries: The Texas Company (Australasia, China, India, Philippine Islands, South Africa) Ltd.. In exchange Texaco was awarded a 50% stake in BAPCo. This was followed by Texaco gaining a 50% interest in the California Arabian Standard Oil Co (Aramco) in December 1936.

The joint venture officially adopted the name Caltex shortened from its original name in 1968, and was eventually known as Caltex Corporation prior to the Chevron-Texaco merger. After the merger, the former joint venture became a wholly owned subsidiary of the merged company and changed its corporate name to ChevronTexaco Global Energy Inc, now Chevron Global Energy Inc.

== History ==
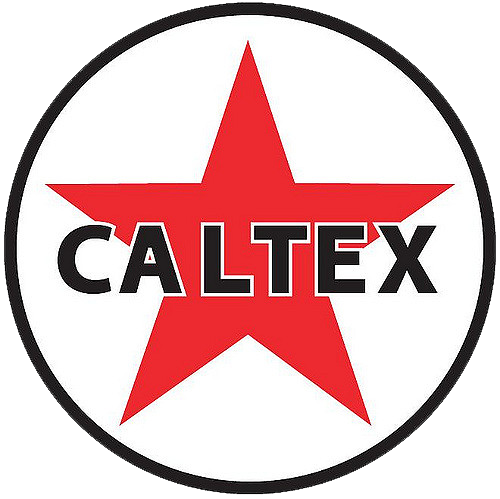
Caltex’s first logo

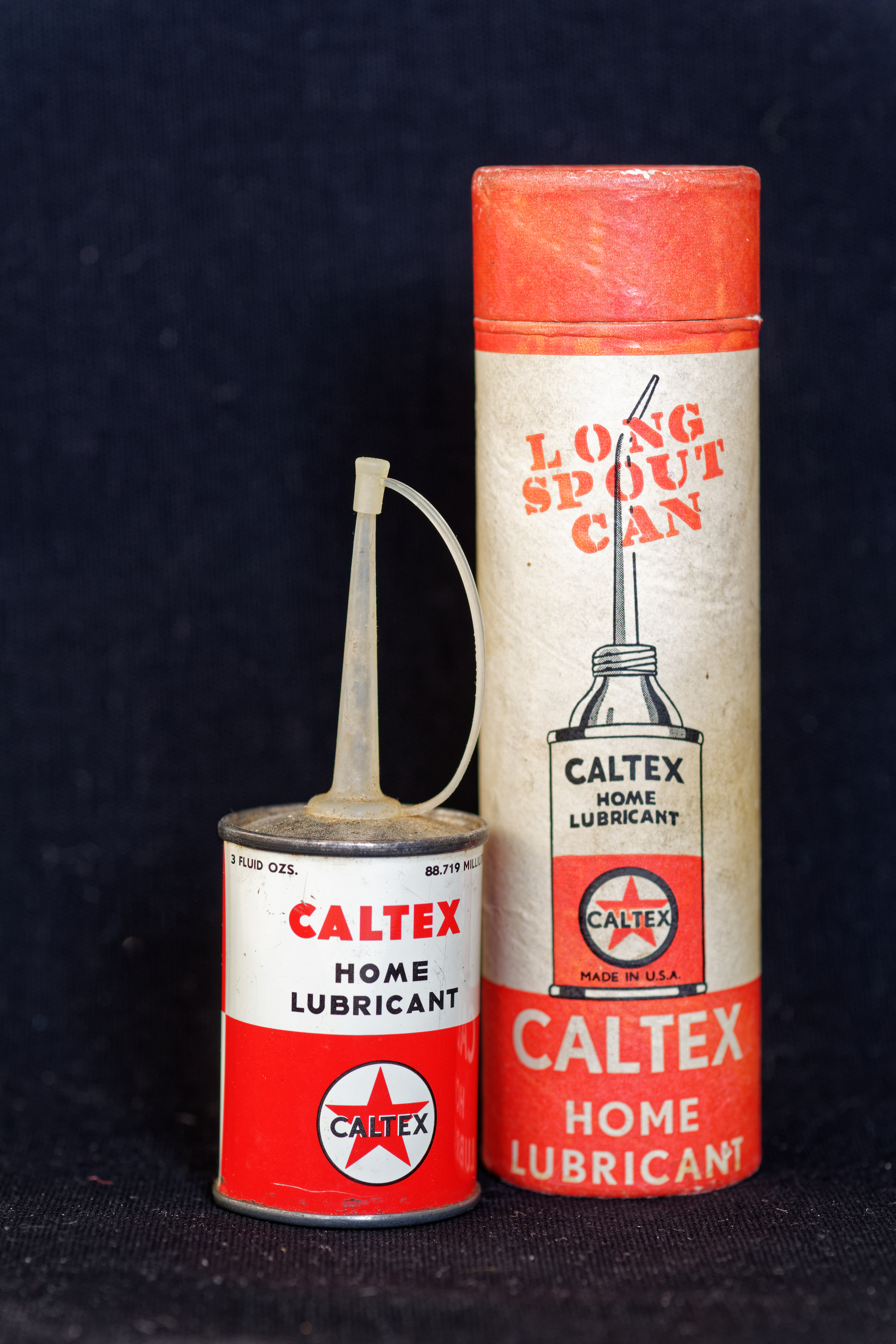
Caltex home lubricant

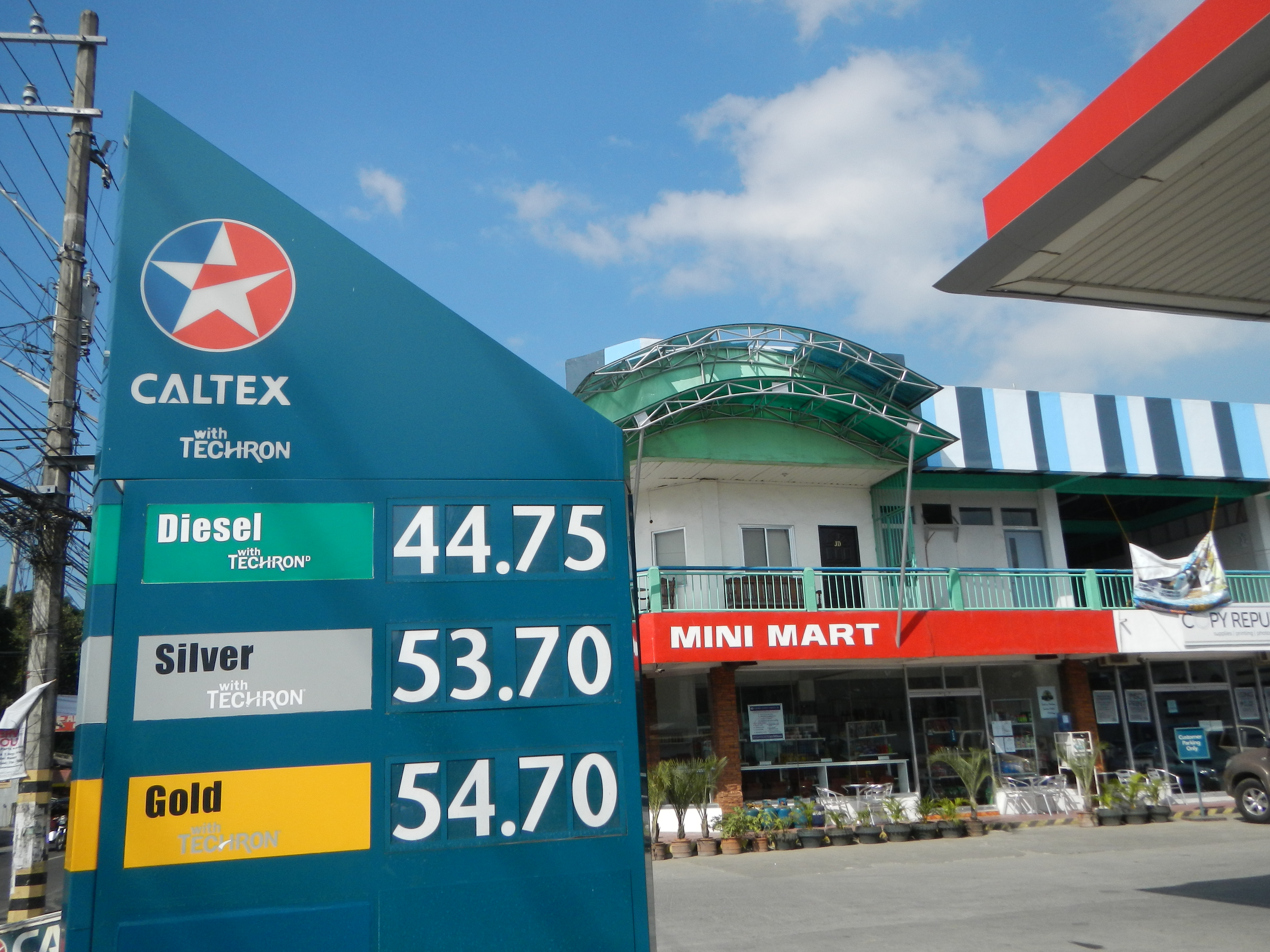
A sign showing gasoline grades sold by Caltex

Caltex timeline:

- 30 June 1936: Standard Oil of California (Socal, later Chevron) and The Texas Company (later Texaco) formed the California Texas Oil Company (Caltex)
- 1947: Tankers purchased from surplus U.S wartime fleet; Texaco's European subsidiaries purchased.
- 1948: Caltex entered partnership with Japan's Nippon Oil Company.
- 1949–66: Caltex built or had interest in new refineries in 20 countries.
- 1967: European interests transferred to Chevron and Texaco; Caltex refocused on Africa and Asia.
- 1968: Caltex entered Korean market as LG Caltex, a joint venture with Lucky Chemical Goldstar (later LG Corporation).
- 1968: California Texas Oil Company Limited changed its name to Caltex Petroleum Corporation
- 1981–83: Acquisitions strengthened position in Hong Kong, Thailand, the Philippines and Australia.
- 1982: Caltex corporate headquarters moved to Dallas, Texas.
- 1985: Representative office opened in Beijing, China.
- 1990s: Caltex moved into other promising markets including India, Sri Lanka, Vietnam, Cambodia, Indonesia, and Lebanon.
- 1996: Caltex introduced new corporate and retail identity, including a new logo, designed by Landor Associates.
- 1998: Caltex relocated its headquarters from Dallas to Singapore.
- 1 January 1999: Caltex changed name from Caltex Petroleum Corporation to Caltex Corporation.
- 1999-2000: Havoline Energy, Vortex fuels and Delo engine oils were launched in Caltex internationally
- 2001: Chevron bought over Texaco to become ChevronTexaco and became full owner of Caltex. Caltex Corporation became ChevronTexaco Global Energy Inc.
- 2005: ChevronTexaco renamed back to Chevron, and ChevronTexaco Global Energy Inc became Chevron Global Energy Inc.
- March 2006: The Techron fuel-additive began to be introduced to 8 countries in Asia Pacific and Africa, including Cambodia, the Philippines and South Africa.

== Operations ==
As of 2015, the Caltex brand name is used in 29 countries in the Eastern Hemisphere.

=== Australia ===
==== 1941 to 2022 ====
Texaco products were first sold in Australia in 1900 by R. W. Cameron & Co. Texas Company (Australasia) Limited was incorporated in New South Wales in 1918, headquartered in Sydney and with operations across Australia and New Zealand. The Caltex brand name began to be used for the first time in Australia when Texas Company (Australasia) Limited changed its name to Caltex Limited five years later on 2 January 1941.

Until 1995, Caltex Australia Limited operated though its subsidiary Caltex Oil (Australia) Pty Ltd. During this time, Caltex Australia also acquired Golden Fleece in 1981. It also floated 25% of its shares to the Australian public the same year, the first multinational oil company to do so in Australia.

In May 1995, Caltex Oil (Australia) Pty Ltd was merged with its rival Ampol Limited to form Australian Petroleum Pty Ltd, owned equally by Caltex Australia Limited and Ampol's parent Pioneer International.

The Caltex brand was also planned to be retired and replaced by Ampol, but this never eventuated. In 1997, Pioneer planned to leave the petroleum industry and sold its 50% share of Australian Petroleum to Caltex Australia, allowing the latter to acquire full ownership and renaming the company to Caltex Petroleum Australia Limited.

In exchange, Pioneer received 90 million Caltex Australia shares (33.33% stake), which it later sold through public offering. That resulted in shareholding changes in Caltex Australia, which became 50% owned by Caltex Corporation (and later Chevron Global) and 50% by Australian shareholders.

In 2015, Chevron sold its 50 per cent stake in Caltex Australia (the deal valuing the company at AU$9.24 billion), allowing Caltex Australia to continue using the Caltex brand. In December 2019, Caltex announced that Chevron had given notice to terminate the licence agreement for the use of the Caltex brand in Australia, effective from 30 June 2020. Caltex Australia was renamed Ampol Limited during the annual general meeting in May 2020.

Ampol would have to cease using the licensed Caltex trademarks thirty months ("work-out period") after the termination of the trademark licence agreement (30 June 2020). The first part of the work-out period was an 18-month "exclusivity period" where Ampol had exclusive rights to use the Caltex brand until 31 December 2021.

The remaining twelve months until 31 December 2022 was a "non-exclusivity period", where both Chevron and Ampol could use the Caltex brand at the same time. After that date, Ampol would no longer be authorised to use the Caltex brand. That meant the rebranding to Ampol had to be completed by 31 December 2022.

==== Since 2022 ====
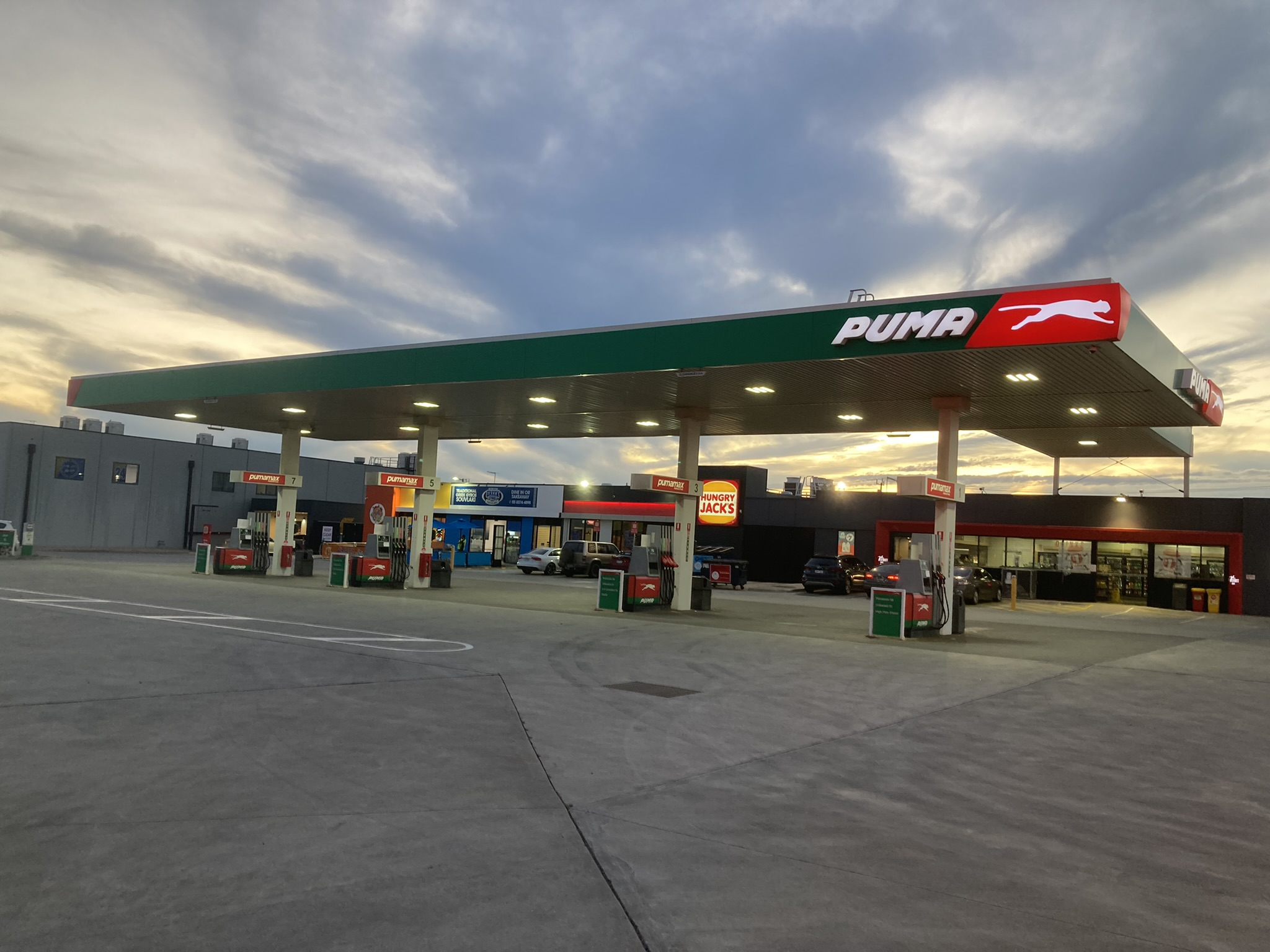
November 2022

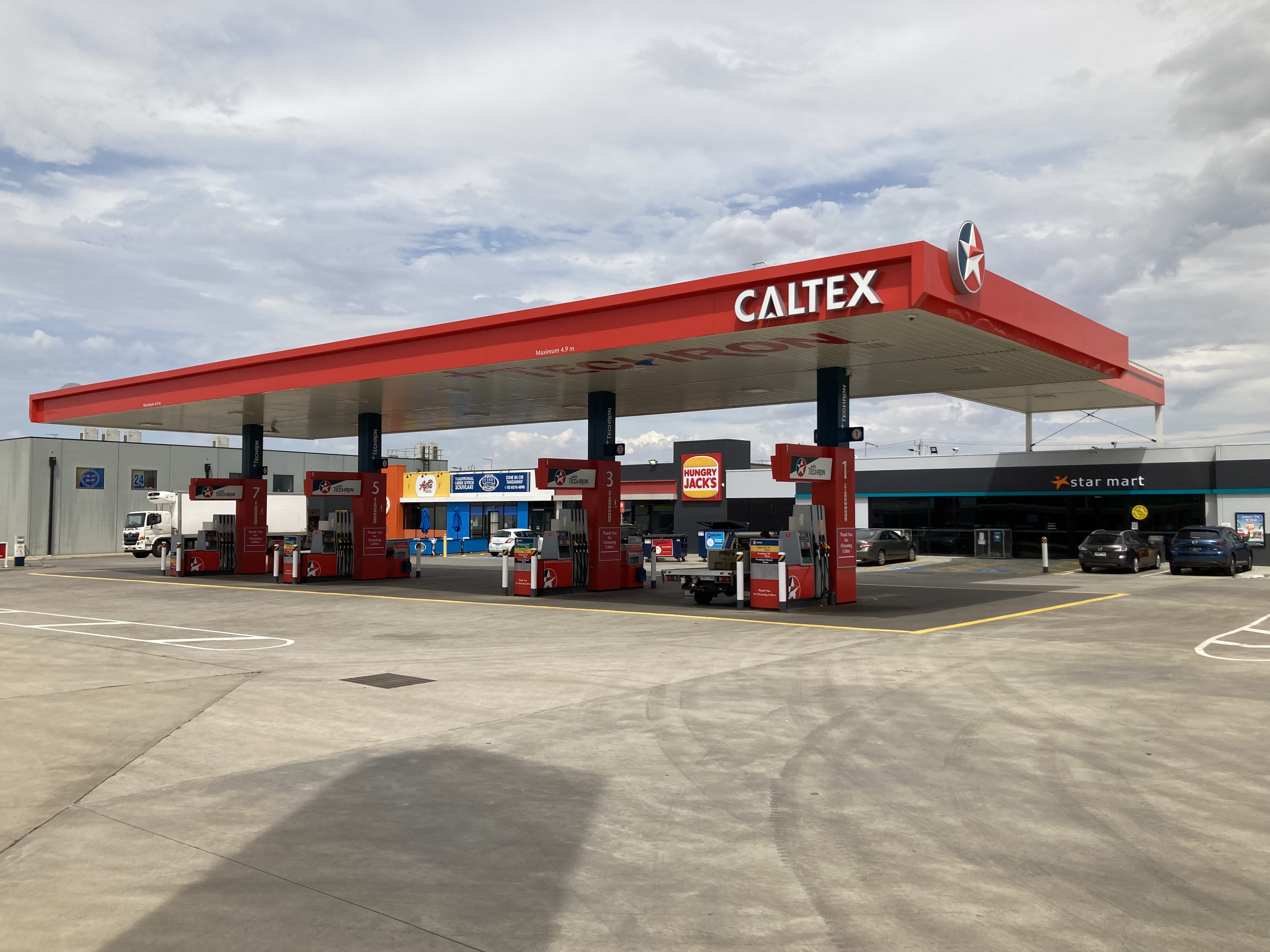
January 2023

Caltex station in Melbourne, Australia before (left) and after (right) rebranding

In November 2019, Chevron announced that it would re-enter the Australian downstream market with the acquisition of Puma Energy's Australian operations via its subsidiary Chevron Australia Downstream, with the acquisition completed in July 2020. The acquisition also included smaller brands such as Gull and Choice Petroleum which were owned by Puma.

In early 2022, after the Caltex brand was no longer exclusive to Ampol (non-exclusivity period), Chevron began to relaunch Caltex in Australia with the opening of new Caltex stations or rebranding from existing Puma service stations.

The relaunched Caltex uses Techron in line with other Chevron Corporation and Caltex stations globally. The Caltex brand is solely used by Chevron Australia since 2023. In early 2023, 17 Puma stations in the Northern Territory and northern Western Australia were sold to South Australian-based OTR, with Caltex fuel to be supplied at these stations.

Early in 2024, Chevron finalised an agreement to purchase most of Viva Energy's Coles Express-branded outlets in South Australia. That followed a Viva undertaking made to the Australian Competition and Consumer Commission to dispose of 25 Coles Express outlets in South Australia as part of Viva's acquisition of the OTR stores from Peregrine Corporation. In exchange, Viva received 13 Chevron sites located in Queensland, New South Wales and Western Australia.

=== Cambodia ===
Texaco marketed lubricants began to be sold in Cambodia in 1924. Caltex Cambodia Limited was incorporated in 1995, with the first service station opened in Pochentong, Phnom Penh in 1996. The first Star Mart store in Cambodia opened the following year in 1997. The company changed its name to Chevron (Cambodia) Limited in 2008, with the Caltex brand still remaining in use.

=== Hong Kong ===
In October 2005, Caltex Oil Hong Kong Limited changed its name to Chevron Hong Kong Limited. As of November 2022, there are 32 Caltex stations in the territory. On 13 February 2026, A Thai petroleum company Bangchak acquired 100% of Chevron's Hong Kong fuel business for $270 million. However, the brand name "Caltex" is still used under the license.

=== India ===
Caltex had a subsidiary in India in the early 1940s through the early 1980s, however as state owned corporation Indian Oil came in to market, strategically Caltex decided to reduce its operation in India. In State of Gujarat there were 2 major dealers of Caltex, T.C. Brothers Company (Saurashtra region) and MS. N. K. Sheth Co. The CEO of T.C. Brothers Co, was Mr. Tribhovandas D Parekh (also known as Mr. Pampu-sheth) and the Chairman was Mr. Cuhnilal D Parekh.

T. C. Brothers company dealt in Petroleum products, service station for automobiles, paint, tiles, pipes, cements and transportation of oil, kerosene, gasoline/petrol in state of Gujarat. In 2010, Caltex started trading under the name GS Caltex India, a subsidiary of Caltex's Korean joint venture GS Caltex.

=== Malaysia ===
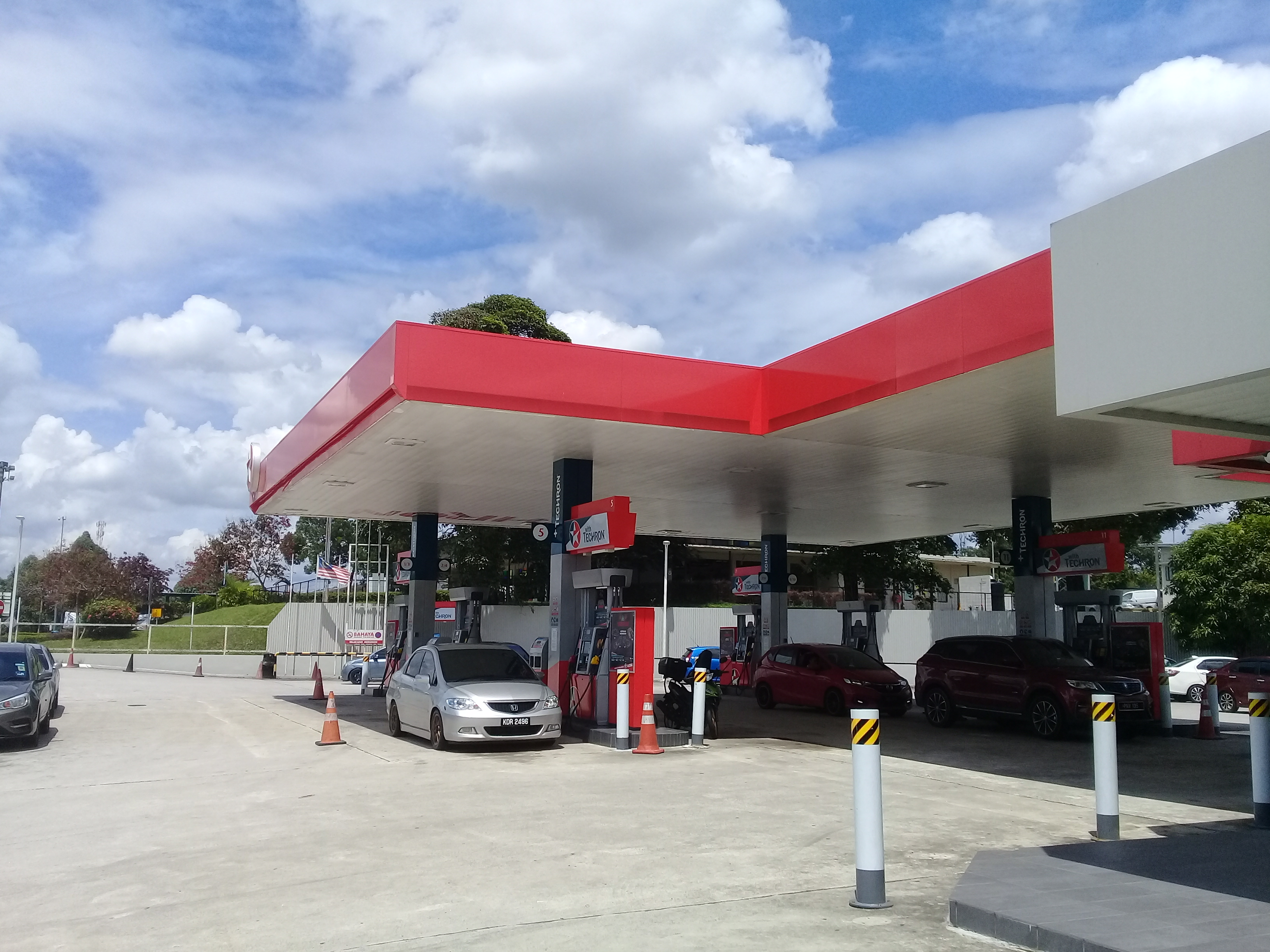
Caltex station at Ayer Keroh Rest Area (Southbound), Melaka.

There are approximately 420 Caltex stations across Peninsular Malaysia; three terminals in Pulau Indah, Prai; and a joint-venture in Pasir Gudang.

Caltex Oil Malaysia Limited changed its name to Chevron Malaysia Limited in 2005.

=== New Zealand ===
Caltex first started in New Zealand as the Star Oil Company in 1920, which was registered and established to import and distribute fuel oils from the USA under the Texaco brand.

Lubricating products were handled by the Texas Company Australasia Limited (i.e. predecessor of Caltex Australia) while refined products such as petrol and kerosene were distributed by Star Oil Company under agreement with the Texas Company. Service stations selling Texaco fuel began in the early 1930s.

When Caltex was established globally in 1936, Texaco signage was changed at service stations to the new name. However, it was not until 12 January 1945 when Caltex Oil (N.Z.) Limited was registered and incorporated.

New Zealand was the first country where Caltex sold Boron fuel, which had been sold in the country for two years under the name Texol. The success in New Zealand allowed Caltex to sign up rights to sell Boron in other markets worldwide. It remained Caltex's fuel brand globally until it was phased out in the 1980s. In November 1996, Caltex Oil (N.Z.) Limited changed its name to Caltex New Zealand Limited.

In 1999, the first ever non-service station (stand-alone) Star Mart store in New Zealand opened in Wellington. At the beginning of 2006, there were 20 stand-alone Star Marts throughout the country. In 2009, the stand-alone stores were sold off and rebranded as Fix; remaining Fix stores were rebranded as Night 'n Day in 2017.

In May 2006, Caltex New Zealand Limited announced it would change its name to Chevron New Zealand, in line with its parent company. In June 2016, Chevron New Zealand was acquired by Z Energy and became a subsidiary known as Z Energy 2015 Limited. The Caltex-branded retail network would remain independently owned and operated, with operators setting their own retail fuel prices.

Z would supply wholesale fuel to the network. The Caltex brand in New Zealand would also continue to be used by Z under a five-year licensing agreement with Chevron International. The licensing agreement was renewed in March 2022 for Z to use the Caltex brand for another five years.

As of February 2026, there are more than 120 Caltex branded service stations and approximately 60 truck stops around New Zealand.

=== Pakistan ===
In 2015, Total Parco announced that it would acquire and rename Caltex petrol pumps in Pakistan by an investment between US$200 million and US$250 million.

=== Philippines ===
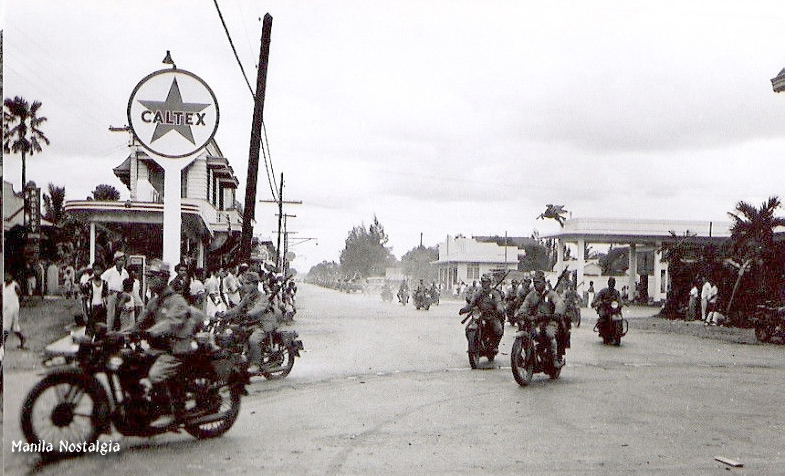
Caltex station seen on the side, as the Imperial Japanese Army captures Manila in WW2 (1942)

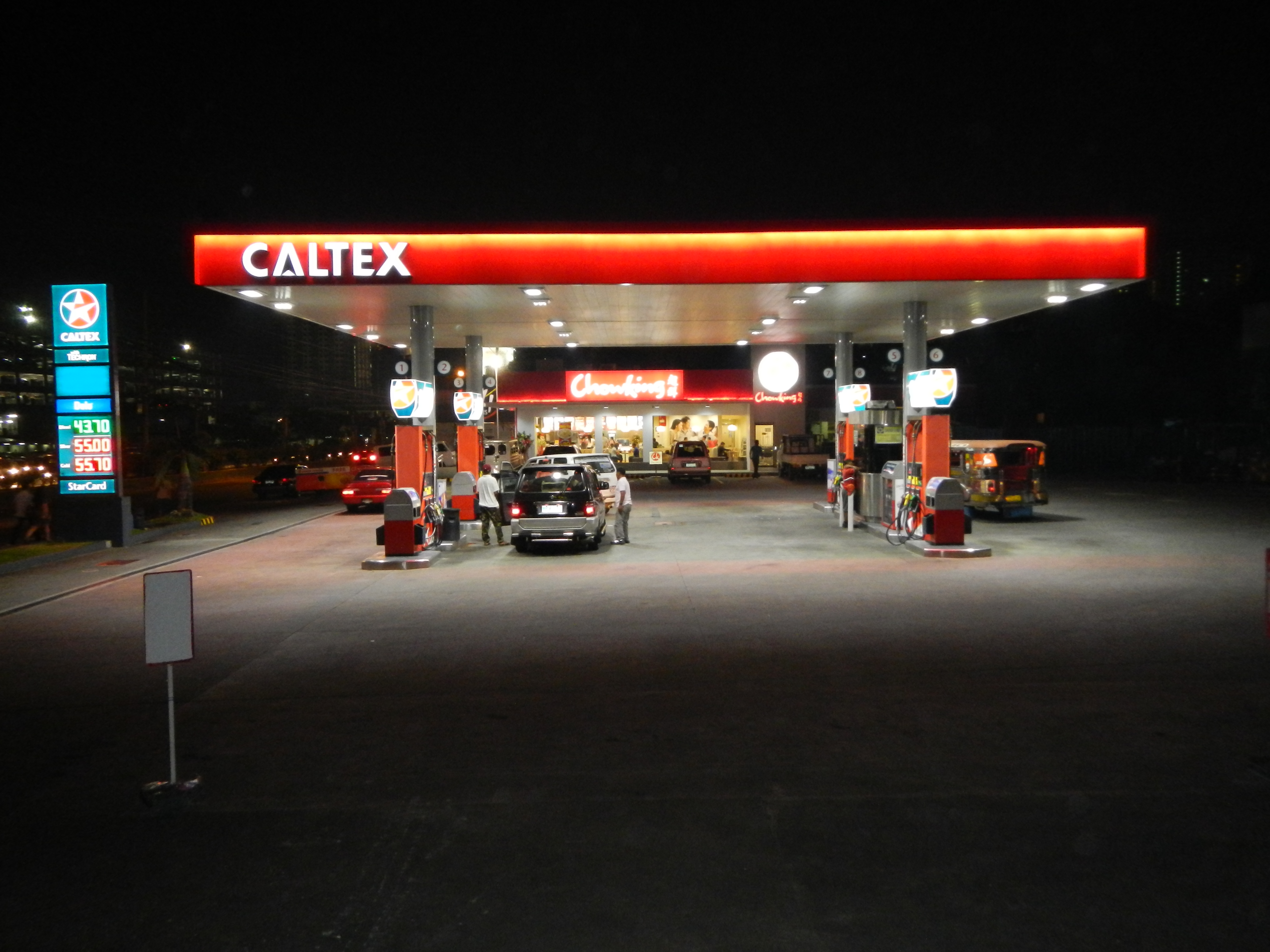
Caltex service station with a Chowking restaurant in Quezon City, Philippines

Caltex was established in the Philippines in 1917 when Texas Company began marketing its products in the Philippines through a local distributor, Wise and Co. In 1921, Texaco (Philippines) was formally established and opened its office in Binondo, Manila. Eleven years later, its Pandacan oil depot was converted into a key distribution terminal to bring products by barge to nearby provinces.

In 1982, Amaury R. Gutierrez succeeded CEO Rod O'Connor to become the first Filipino CEO of Caltex (Philippines), Inc. Gutierrez served until 15 July 1988 when he was elected chairman of the board; Francis Ablan succeeded him as CEO.

Caltex has nearly 600 stores in the Philippines.

=== Singapore ===
Caltex began in Singapore when Texas Company (China) Ltd was established in the then-British colony in 1933. It was renamed Caltex in the 1950s. In 1979, Caltex acquired a one-third interest in Singapore Refining Co. Pte. Ltd. (SRC) (the balance held by BP and Singapore Petroleum Company), which operates a 285,000 barrels per day (45,300 m^{3}/d) refinery in Singapore. Caltex’s interest in SRC was increased to 50 percent in 2004.

In 1999, Caltex moved its operating headquarters to Singapore from Dallas. As of November 2022, there are 25 Caltex stations in the country.

=== South Africa and Botswana ===
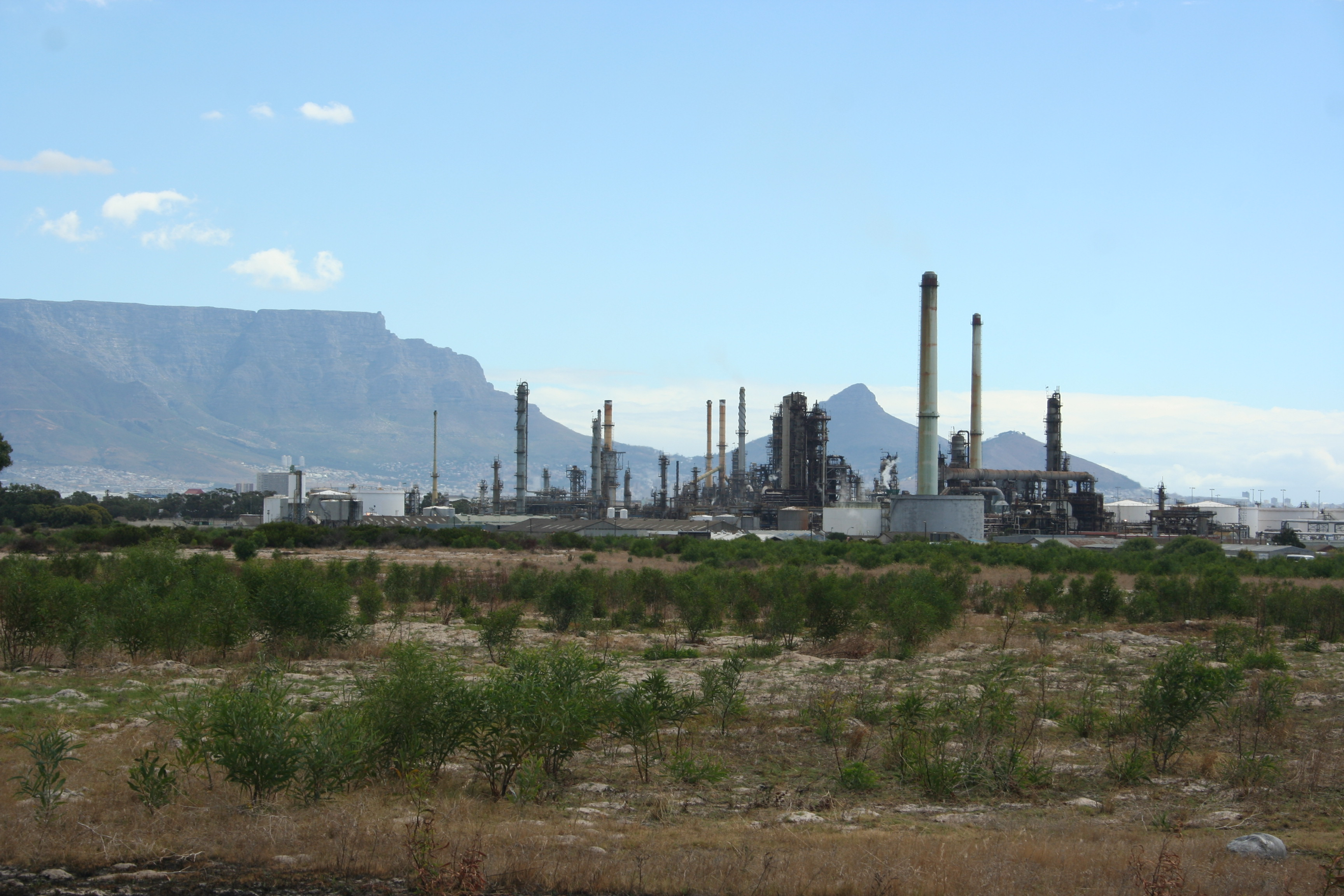
The Astron Energy Refinery (previously known as the Caltex Refinery) in Cape Town, South Africa

The Texas Company (South Africa) Ltd was incorporated in 1911 and headquartered in Cape Town.

Chevron South Africa (CSA), who operated the Caltex brand in the country and neighbouring country of Botswana, was acquired by Glencore and Off the Shelf Investments (OTS) in September 2018 and was rebranded as Astron Energy.

Astron Energy then continued to operate the Caltex brand under a license agreement with Chevron. The 850 Caltex service stations in South Africa and Botswana began to be rebranded as Astron in September 2022.

Glencore owns 72% of Astron Energy South Africa, with the remaining 28% held by Off The Shelf Investments (OTS) (23%) and employees (5%). Glencore owns 100% of Astron Energy Botswana. Astron Energy owns a refinery in Milnerton, Cape Town, which was previously owned by Caltex. The refinery has a production capacity of 100,000 barrels per day and produces a range of petrochemical products including petrol, diesel, jet fuel, liquefied petroleum gas, fuel oil and paving asphalt.

The company has a lubricants manufacturing plant and laboratory in Durban. Prior to the rebranding, a quarter of Caltex's service stations were located in South Africa, making it one of the country's top five petroleum brands.

Caltex had been criticized frequently in the region.

Caltex was one of the founding members of the Fuels Industry Association of South Africa (FIASA), when the organization launched in 1994.

=== South Korea ===
GS Caltex is Caltex's joint venture with GS Group (previously split off from LG Corporation) in South Korea. It was founded in May 1967 as the first private oil company in Korea.

=== Taiwan ===
Some Asian operations are run by Caltex (Asia) Limited, based in Taipei.

== Media ==
In the 1955 film Godzilla Raids Again, convicts escape in a truck with the Caltex livery on the side.
