= Bacungan River =

River in Palawan, Philippines

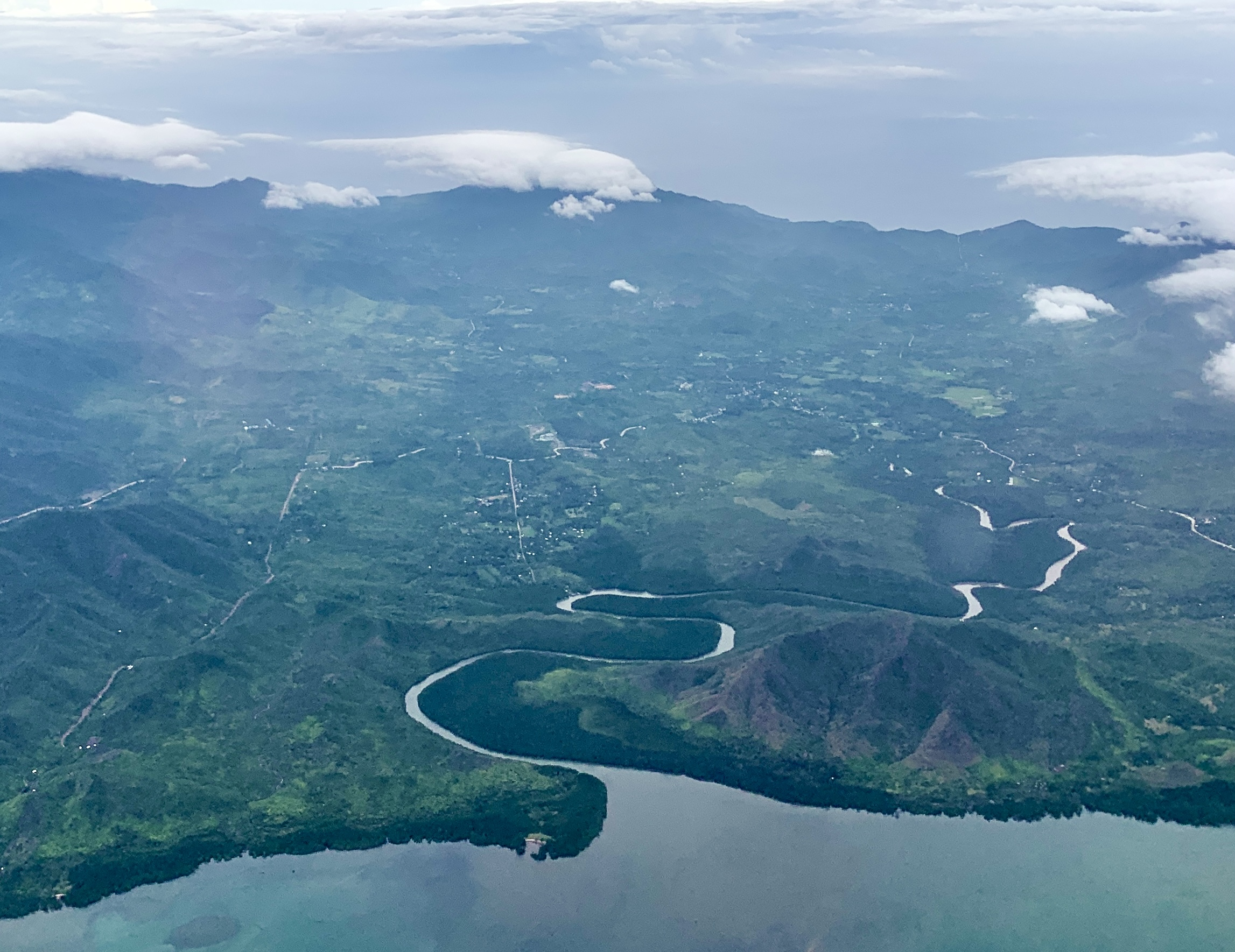
- Aerial view of Bacungan River, October 2022

- Location in Palawan Bacungan River (Philippines)

Location
- Country: Philippines
- Region: Mimaropa
- Province: Palawan

Physical characteristics
- Mouth: Honda Bay
  - coordinates: 9°53′52″N 118°44′33″E

The Bacungan River is a stream or a body of running water in the Philippines' province of Palawan, Mimaropa. The river is situated south of Mangrove Inlet. The terrain elevation above sea level is estimated to be 15 meters (49 ft).
