= Iwahig River =

River in Palawan, Philippines

Iwahig River Balsahan River
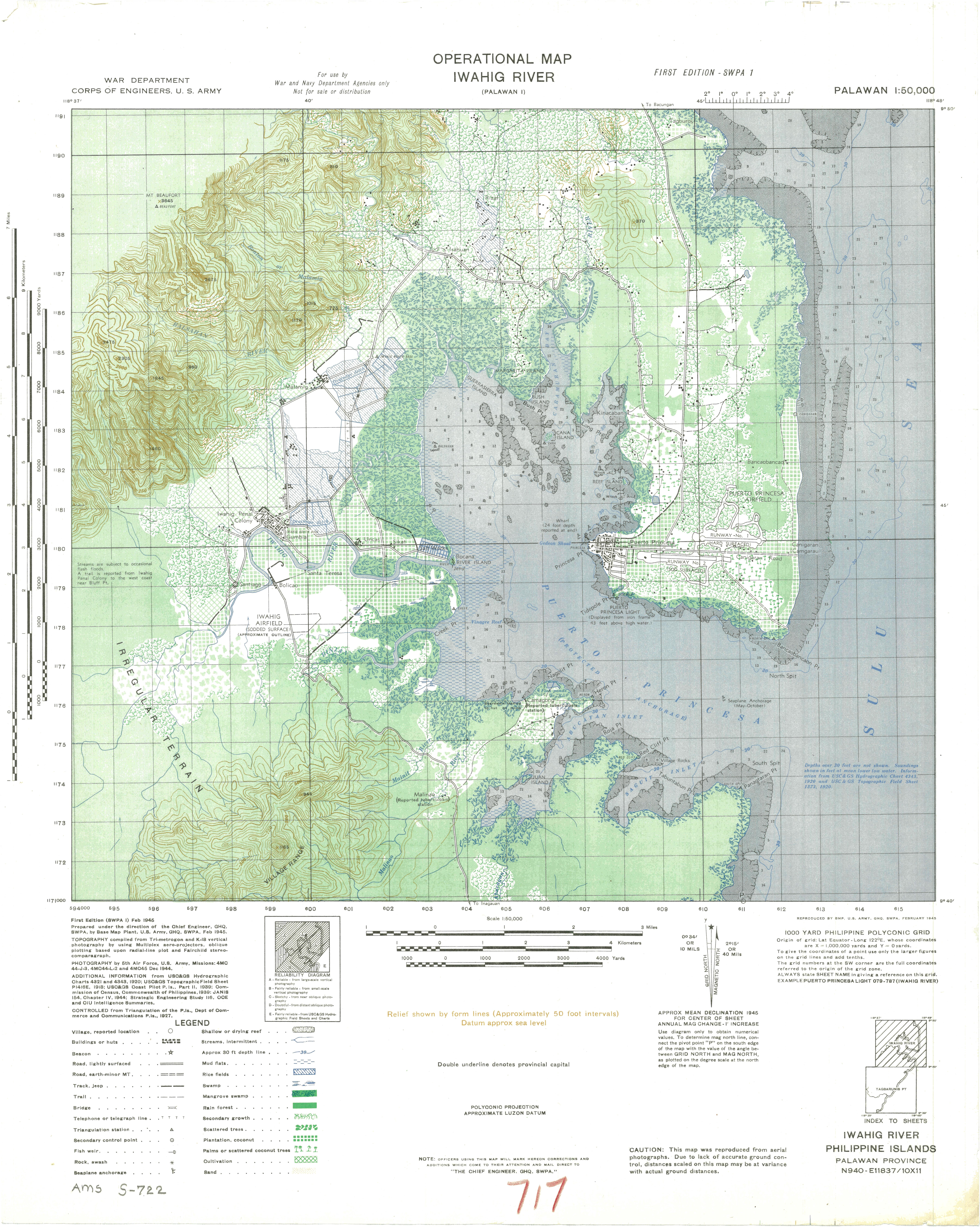
- Iwahig River Operational Map 1st Edition - NARA

- Iwahig River Iwahig River (Philippines)

Location
- Country: Philippines
- Region: Palawan

Physical characteristics
- Source
  - coordinates: 9°08′58″N 118°4′52″E
  - elevation: 8 metres (26 ft)
- Mouth: Sulu Sea
  - coordinates: 8°37′32″N 117°31′53″E
- Length: 4.14 kilometres (2.57 mi)
- Basin size: 22,859 ha (228.59 km^{2})

The Iwahig River, also known as Balsahan River, is a watershed located in the Iwahig Penal Colony in Palawan, Philippines. It has an elevation of 8 metres (26 ft) with an approximate length of 4.14 kilometres (2.57 mi) The river basin is a 22,859-hectare (56,490-acre) watershed encompassing the city of Puerto Princesa in Palawan province.

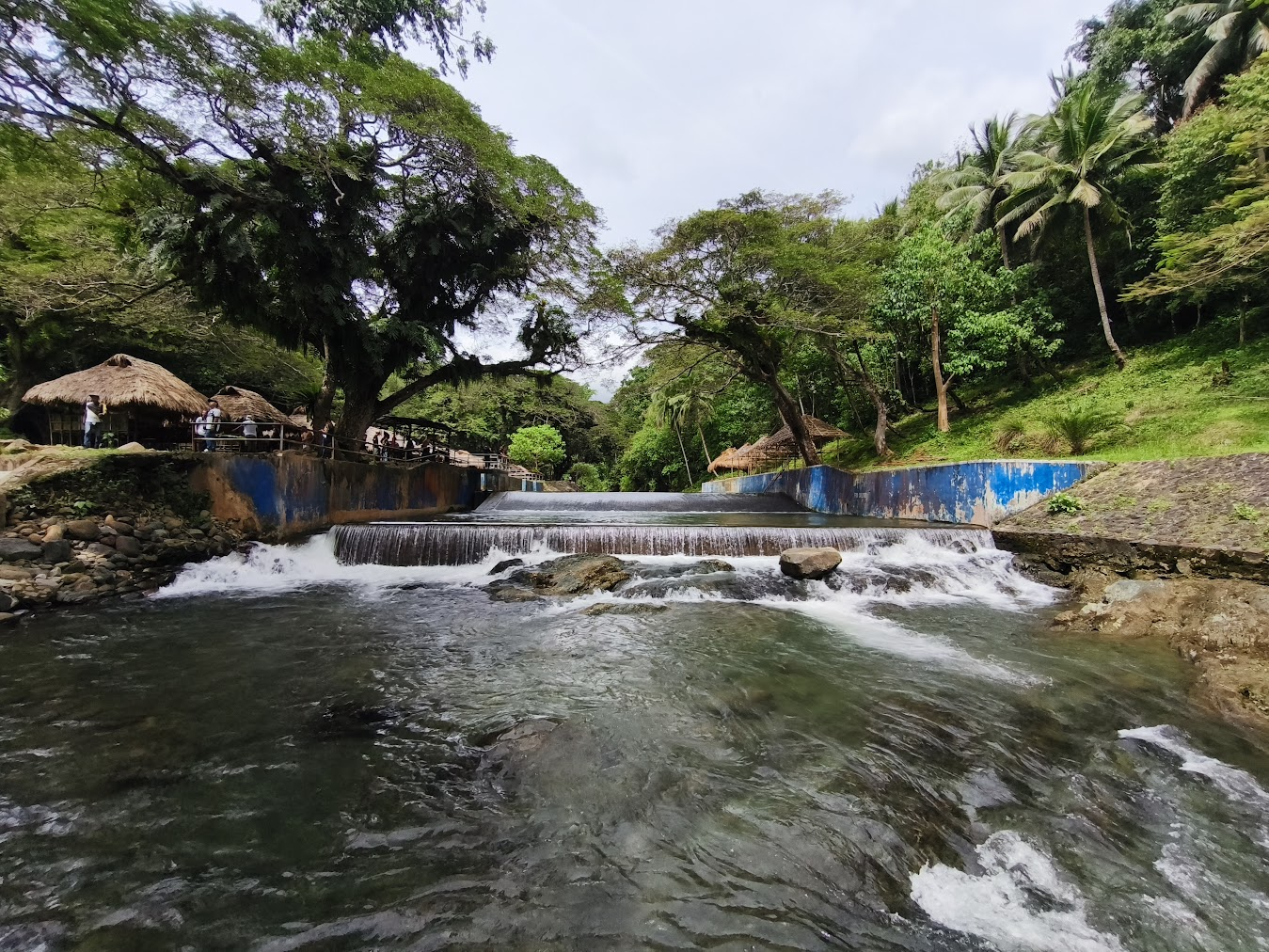
Balsahan Natural Pool inside Iwahig Penal Colony

== Topography ==
The basin area has a gentle a slope to steep slopes with an elevation range of 10 metres (33 ft) to more than 300 metres (980 ft) above sea level. Soil types includes Guimbalaon clay, Taburos clay and Bay clay loam. The basin's large area are unclassified with its mountainous land with a closed canopy of trees that covers almost the entire basin.

== Flooding ==
The towns of Iwahig ang Montible were found susceptible to flooding by the study conducted by the Mines and Geosciences Bureau.
