= Philippine National Oil Company =

Southeast Asian state-owned petroleum enterprise

- Type: Statutory corporation
- Industry: Oil, energy
- Founded: November 9, 1973
- Headquarters: Taguig, Philippines
- Key people: Oliver B. Butalid, President/CEO
- Subsidiaries: List: PNOC Exploration Corporation PNOC Renewables Corporation

The Philippine National Oil Company (PNOC; Filipino: Pambansang Kompanya sa Langis ng Pilipinas) is an energy company created on November 9, 1973, as a government-owned and controlled corporation founded during Ferdinand Marcos' Martial Law era to supply oil to the Philippines. Since then, its charter has been amended several times to include exploration, exploitation and development of all energy resources in the country.

== History ==
PNOC was created in response to the 1970s energy crisis. The Philippine government, governed by President Ferdinand Marcos, responded to the crises by founding PNOC and forging oil-supply partnerships with supplier countries. The government later acquired refineries and petroleum transport and marketing firms with the aim of being a “total” energy company. PNOC also initiated the exploration of the country’s oil and non-oil energy resources, such as geothermal.

PNOC Exploration Corporation concentrates on the oil and gas business. Its Malampaya Deepwater Gas-to-Power Project is one of the largest and most significant industrial endeavors in Philippine history which "signalled the birth of the natural gas industry in the Philippines". PNOC EC’s is involved with the project with Royal Dutch Shell Exploration (as operator) and Texaco.

In 1995, PNOC also ventured into petrochemicals, setting up the Philippines' first petrochemical industrial estate in Mariveles, Bataan.

In 1994, the Government of the Philippines partially privatized Petron through signing of stock purchase agreement with Saudi Aramco and in 2009, San Miguel Corporation took full control of Petron Corporation.

== Subsidiaries ==
PNOC currently has 2 subsidiaries working together to realize PNOC’s vision: PNOC Exploration Corporation and PNOC Renewables Corporation.

=== PNOC Exploration Corporation ===
PNOC Exploration Corporation is the upstream oil, gas and coal subsidiary of the state-owned Philippine National Oil Company. A government owned and controlled corporation, the Company was incorporated on April 20, 1976, and is mandated by the government through the Department of Energy (DOE) to take the lead in exploration, development and production of the country’s oil, gas and coal resources. The Company was listed in the Makati Stock Exchange and the Manila Stock Exchange in 1976 and 1977, respectively.

At present, PNOC EC has seven (7) petroleum Service Contracts (SCs), namely: SC 37 (Cagayan Basin), SC 38 (Malampaya), SC 47 (Offshore Mindoro), SC 57 (Calamian), SC 58 (West Calamian), SC 59 (West Balabac) and SC 63 (East Sabina). The Company is the operator in SC 37, SC 47 and SC 63 and a non-operating partner in SC 38, SC 57, SC 58 and SC 59.

PNOC EC used to operate the very first natural gas facility in the country- the San Antonio Gas Power Plant within SC 37 before joining the Malampaya consortium (SC 38) in 1999 with a 10% stake. Malampaya is the country’s single biggest investment of its kind.

PNOC EC also holds six (6) Coal Operating Contracts (COCs), namely: COC 41 (Malangas), COC 122 (Isabela), COC 141 (Isabela), COC 184 (Agusan del Sur), COC 185 (Zamboanga Sibugay) and COC 186 (Zamboanga Sibugay). As part of its coal business, the company also trades coal from other sources through its two (2) coal terminals located in Malangas and Cebu.

=== PNOC Renewables Corporation ===
PNOC Renewables Corporation (PNOC RC) is a fully owned subsidiary of state-owned Philippine National Oil Company (PNOC). Organized on March 7, 2008, it is the newest PNOC subsidiary. PNOC RC will be the primary vehicle of PNOC in promoting, developing and implementing new and renewable energy sources in the country. Through renewable energy, the country would be able to reduce its dependence on imported oil, while mitigating climate change. Renewable energy is an important component in the country's drive towards energy self-sufficiency, security and independence. Renewable energy projects include Hydropower Projects, Wind Project, Biomass and/or Waste to Energy Projects, Solar Electrification Projects, Geothermal Projects.

== See also ==
- Petron Corporation
